= 1988–89 FIS Freestyle Ski World Cup =

Freestyle skiing competitive season

Freestyle Skiing World Cup 1988/89
Discipline	Men	Women
Overall	(Canada) Chris Simboli	(Switzerland) Conny Kissling
Moguls	(United States) Nelson Carmichael	(France) Raphaëlle Monod
Aerials	(Norway) Tor Skeie	(France) Catherine Lombard
Ballet	(West Germany) Hermann Reitberger (5)	(United States) Jan Bucher (7)
Combined	(Canada) Chris Simboli	(Switzerland) Conny Kissling

Competition
Locations	10	10
Individual	38	40

The 1988/89 FIS Freestyle Skiing World Cup was the tenth World Cup season in freestyle skiing organised by International Ski Federation. The season started on 9 December 1988 and ended on 24 March 1989. This season included four disciplines: aerials, moguls, ballet and combined.

== Men ==
=== Moguls ===
Num	Season	Date	Place	Event	Winner	Second	Third
75	1	9 December 1988	(France) Tignes	MO	(United States) Nelson Carmichael	(France) Olivier Allamand	(Switzerland) Bernard Brandt
76	2	17 December 1988	(France) La Plagne	MO	(United States) Nelson Carmichael	(France) Edgar Grospiron	(Sweden) Thomas Kristiansson
77	3	7 January 1989	(Canada) Mont Gabriel	MO	(Norway) Hans Engelsen Eide	(United States) Nelson Carmichael	(France) Edgar Grospiron
78	4	13 January 1989	(United States) Lake Placid	MO	(United States) Nelson Carmichael	(France) Edgar Grospiron	(United States) Scott Ogren
79	5	22 January 1989	(Canada) Calgary	MO	(France) Edgar Grospiron	(United States) Nelson Carmichael	(France) Bruno Bertrand
80	6	28 January 1989	(United States) Breckenridge	MO	(France) Edgar Grospiron	(Sweden) Leif Persson	(United States) Mark Moeller
81	7	12 February 1989	(France) La Clusaz	MO	(France) Edgar Grospiron	(United States) Nelson Carmichael	(Sweden) Leif Persson
82	8	11 March 1989	(Norway) Voss	MO	(United States) Nelson Carmichael	(Norway) Hans Engelsen Eide	(United States) Scott Ogren
83	9	17 March 1989	(Sweden) Åre	MO	(United States) Nelson Carmichael	(France) Edgar Grospiron	(France) Youri Gilg
84	10	23 March 1989	(Finland) Suomu	MO	(France) Edgar Grospiron	(Switzerland) Jürg Biner	(United States) Nelson Carmichael

=== Ballet ===
Num	Season	Date	Place	Event	Winner	Second	Third
75	1	10 December 1988	(France) Tignes	AC	(Norway) Rune Kristiansen	(West Germany) Hubert Sewald	(United States) Lane Spina
76	2	16 December 1988	(France) La Plagne	AC	(West Germany) Hermann Reitberger	(United States) Lane Spina	(Italy) Roberto Franco
77	3	6 January 1989	(Canada) Mont Gabriel	AC	(West Germany) Hermann Reitberger	(Norway) Rune Kristiansen	(United States) Lane Spina
78	4	14 January 1989	(United States) Lake Placid	AC	(West Germany) Hermann Reitberger	(Norway) Rune Kristiansen	(United States) Lane Spina
79	5	20 January 1989	(Canada) Calgary	AC	(West Germany) Hermann Reitberger	(Canada) Dave Walker	(United States) Lane Spina
80	6	27 January 1989	(United States) Breckenridge	AC	(United States) Lane Spina	(West Germany) Hermann Reitberger	(Canada) Chris Simboli
81	7	10 February 1989	(France) La Clusaz	AC	(West Germany) Hermann Reitberger	(Canada) Dave Walker	(United States) Nelson Finstad
82	8	10 March 1989	(Norway) Voss	AC	(West Germany) Hermann Reitberger	(United States) Lane Spina	(Norway) Rune Kristiansen
83	9	16 March 1989	(Sweden) Åre	AC	(United States) Lane Spina	(Canada) Richard Pierce	(Canada) Dave Walker
84	10	22 March 1989	(Finland) Suomu	AC	(Norway) Rune Kristiansen	(United States) Lane Spina	(Canada) Richard Pierce

=== Aerials ===
Num	Season	Date	Place	Event	Winner	Second	Third
74	1	11 December 1988	(France) Tignes	AE	(Canada) André Ouimet	(France) Éric Laboureix	(Canada) Philippe LaRoche
75	2	18 December 1988	(France) La Plagne	AE	(Norway) Tor Skeie	(Canada) John Ross	(Canada) André Ouimet
76	3	8 January 1989	(Canada) Mont Gabriel	AE	(Canada) John Ross	(Canada) Philippe LaRoche	(Canada) André Ouimet
77	4	15 January 1989	(United States) Lake Placid	AE	(Norway) Tor Skeie	(Canada) Lloyd Langlois	(Canada) Alain LaRoche
78	5	21 January 1989	(Canada) Calgary	AE	(Norway) Tor Skeie	(United States) Trace Worthington	(Canada) Lloyd Langlois
79	6	29 January 1989	(United States) Breckenridge	AE	(Canada) Philippe LaRoche	(France) Didier Méda	(Switzerland) Andreas Schönbächler
80	7	11 February 1989	(France) La Clusaz	AE	(Canada) Jean-Marc Rozon	(Norway) Tor Skeie	(France) Didier Méda
81	8	12 March 1989	(Norway) Voss	AE	(France) Didier Méda	(United States) Trace Worthington	(France) Jean-Marc Bacquin
82	9	18 March 1989	(Sweden) Åre	AE	(United States) Russ Magnanti	(United States) Trace Worthington	(France) Didier Méda

=== Combined ===
Num	Season	Date	Place	Event	Winner	Second	Third
69	1	11 December 1988	(France) Tignes	CO	(France) Éric Laboureix	(Canada) Alain LaRoche	(Canada) Chris Simboli
70	2	18 December 1988	(France) La Plagne	CO	(France) Éric Laboureix	information is not available	(United States) Scott Ogren
71	3	8 January 1989	(Canada) Mont Gabriel	CO	(France) Éric Laboureix	(Canada) Chris Simboli	(Canada) Alain LaRoche
72	4	15 January 1989	(United States) Lake Placid	CO	(France) Éric Laboureix	(Canada) Chris Simboli	(Canada) Alain LaRoche
73	5	22 January 1989	(Canada) Calgary	CO	(Canada) Alain LaRoche	(Canada) Chris Simboli	(United States) Scott Ogren
74	6	29 January 1989	(United States) Breckenridge	CO	(United States) Scott Ogren	(Canada) Chris Simboli	(Canada) Alain LaRoche
75	7	12 February 1989	(France) La Clusaz	CO	(United States) Scott Ogren	(Canada) Chris Simboli	(Italy) Klaus Pescolderung
76	8	12 March 1989	(Norway) Voss	CO	(United States) Scott Ogren	(Canada) Chris Simboli	(United States) Scott Harrington
77	9	18 March 1989	(Sweden) Åre	CO	(France) Youri Gilg	(Finland) Timo Kanninen	(Canada) Chris Simboli

== Ladies ==
=== Moguls ===
Num	Season	Date	Place	Event	Winner	Second	Third
75	1	9 December 1988	(France) Tignes	MO	(France) Raphaëlle Monod	(Norway) Stine Lise Hattestad	(United States) Liz McIntyre
76	2	17 December 1988	(France) La Plagne	MO	(Norway) Stine Lise Hattestad	(Italy) Silvia Marciandi	(United States) Donna Weinbrecht
77	3	7 January 1989	(Canada) Mont Gabriel	MO	(United States) Donna Weinbrecht	(West Germany) Tatjana Mittermayer	(West Germany) Birgit Stein-Keppler
78	4	13 January 1989	(United States) Lake Placid	MO	(Norway) Stine Lise Hattestad	(United States) Donna Weinbrecht	(West Germany) Tatjana Mittermayer
79	5	22 January 1989	(Canada) Calgary	MO	(Canada) LeeLee Morrison	(United States) Donna Weinbrecht	(Italy) Silvia Marciandi
80	6	28 January 1989	(United States) Breckenridge	MO	(Canada) LeeLee Morrison	(France) Raphaëlle Monod	(Norway) Stine Lise Hattestad
81	7	12 February 1989	(France) La Clusaz	MO	(France) Raphaëlle Monod	(West Germany) Tatjana Mittermayer	(United States) Donna Weinbrecht
82	8	11 March 1989	(Norway) Voss	MO	(France) Raphaëlle Monod	(Canada) LeeLee Morrison	(United States) Donna Weinbrecht
83	9	17 March 1989	(Sweden) Åre	MO	(Italy) Silvia Marciandi	(West Germany) Tatjana Mittermayer	(France) Raphaëlle Monod
84	10	23 March 1989	(Finland) Suomu	MO	(United States) Donna Weinbrecht	(France) Raphaëlle Monod	(Sweden) Lise Benberg

=== Ballet ===
Num	Season	Date	Place	Event	Winner	Second	Third
76	1	10 December 1988	(France) Tignes	AC	(Switzerland) Conny Kissling	(Canada) Lucie Barma	(Belgium) Viviane Dictus
77	2	16 December 1988	(France) La Plagne	AC	(Switzerland) Conny Kissling	(United States) Jan Bucher	(United States) Betsy Reid
78	3	6 January 1989	(Canada) Mont Gabriel	AC	(United States) Jan Bucher	(Switzerland) Conny Kissling	(Canada) Meredith Gardner
79	4	14 January 1989	(United States) Lake Placid	AC	(Switzerland) Conny Kissling (United States) Jan Bucher		(United States) Betsy Reid
80	5	20 January 1989	(Canada) Calgary	AC	(United States) Jan Bucher	(Switzerland) Conny Kissling	(Canada) Lucie Barma
81	6	27 January 1989	(United States) Breckenridge	AC	(United States) Jan Bucher	(Switzerland) Conny Kissling	(Canada) Lucie Barma
82	7	10 February 1989	(France) La Clusaz	AC	(United States) Jan Bucher	(Switzerland) Conny Kissling	(United Kingdom) Julia Snell
83	8	10 March 1989	(Norway) Voss	AC	(United States) Jan Bucher	(Switzerland) Conny Kissling	(Canada) Lucie Barma
84	9	16 March 1989	(Sweden) Åre	AC	(Switzerland) Conny Kissling	(United States) Jan Bucher	(Canada) Lucie Barma
85	10	22 March 1989	(Finland) Suomu	AC	(United States) Jan Bucher	(Switzerland) Conny Kissling	(France) Nadège Ferrier

=== Aerials ===
Num	Season	Date	Place	Event	Winner	Second	Third
75	1	11 December 1988	(France) Tignes	AE	(Sweden) Susanna Antonsson	(Canada) Meredith Gardner	(France) Catherine Lombard
76	2	18 Dec 1988	(France) La Plagne	AE	(West Germany) Sonja Reichart	(United States) Melanie Palenik	(Canada) Meredith Gardner
77	3	8 January 1989	(Canada) Mont Gabriel	AE	(France) Catherine Lombard	(West Germany) Sonja Reichart	(Canada) Meredith Gardner
78	4	15 January 1989	(United States) Lake Placid	AE	(United States) Melanie Palenik	(United States) Jodie Spiegel	(Japan) Hiroko Fujii
79	5	21 January 1989	(Canada) Calgary	AE	(France) Catherine Lombard	(Canada) Meredith Gardner	(Norway) Edel Hovland
80	6	29 January 1989	(United States) Breckenridge	AE	(France) Catherine Lombard	(United States) Melanie Palenik	(Sweden) Susanna Antonsson
81	7	11 February 1989	(France) La Clusaz	AE	(West Germany) Sonja Reichart	(France) Catherine Lombard	(Canada) Meredith Gardner
82	8	12 March 1989	(Norway) Voss	AE	(West Germany) Sonja Reichart	(Norway) Edel Hovland	(United States) Melanie Palenik
83	9	18 March 1989	(Sweden) Åre	AE	(United States) Melanie Palenik	(United States) Jodie Spiegel	(West Germany) Sonja Reichart
84	10	24 March 1989	(Finland) Suomu	AE	(France) Catherine Lombard	(West Germany) Sonja Reichart	(United States) Melanie Palenik

=== Combined ===
Num	Season	Date	Place	Event	Winner	Second	Third
70	1	11 December 1988	(France) Tignes	CO	(Canada) Meredith Gardner	(Switzerland) Conny Kissling	(United States) Melanie Palenik
71	2	18 December 1988	(France) La Plagne	CO	(Switzerland) Conny Kissling	(United States) Melanie Palenik	(Canada) Meredith Gardner
72	3	8 January 1989	(Canada) Mont Gabriel	CO	(United States) Melanie Palenik	(Switzerland) Conny Kissling	(Canada) Shannon Carey
73	4	15 January 1989	(United States) Lake Placid	CO	(Switzerland) Conny Kissling	(United States) Melanie Palenik	(Canada) Meredith Gardner
74	5	22 January 1989	(Canada) Calgary	CO	(Switzerland) Conny Kissling	(Canada) Meredith Gardner	(United States) Melanie Palenik
75	6	29 January 1989	(United States) Breckenridge	CO	(United States) Melanie Palenik	(Canada) Meredith Gardner	(Australia) Tarsha Ebbern
76	7	12 February 1989	(France) La Clusaz	CO	(Canada) Meredith Gardner	(Switzerland) Conny Kissling	(France) Veronique Granier
77	8	12 March 1989	(Norway) Voss	CO	(United States) Melanie Palenik	(Switzerland) Conny Kissling	(Canada) Meredith Gardner
78	9	18 March 1989	(Sweden) Åre	CO	(Switzerland) Conny Kissling	(United States) Melanie Palenik	(Canada) Meredith Gardner
79	10	24 March 1989	(Finland) Suomu	CO	(Switzerland) Conny Kissling	(United States) Melanie Palenik	(Canada) Meredith Gardner

== Men's standings ==
=== Overall ===
Rank		Points
1	(Canada) Chris Simboli	58
2	(United States) Scott Ogren	56
3	(Canada) Alain LaRoche	46
4	(France) Éric Laboureix	42
5	(West Germany) Hermann Reitberger	25

- Standings after 38 races.

=== Moguls ===
Rank		Points
1	(United States) Nelson Carmichael	173
2	(France) Edgar Grospiron	172
3	(Norway) Hans Engelsen Eide	143
4	(Switzerland) Bernard Brandt	136
5	(Sweden) Leif Persson	133

- Standings after 10 races.

=== Aerials ===
Rank		Points
1	(Norway) Tor Skeie	143
2	(Canada) Philippe LaRoche	138
3	(France) Didier Méda	136
4	(Canada) André Ouimet	127
5	(United States) Trace Worthington	125

- Standings after 9 races.

=== Ballet ===
Rank		Points
1	(West Germany) Hermann Reitberger	174
2	(United States) Lane Spina	168
3	(Norway) Rune Kristiansen	165
4	(Canada) Richard Pierce	152
5	(Canada) Dave Walker	151

- Standings after 10 races.

=== Combined ===
Rank		Points
1	(Canada) Chris Simboli	84
2	(United States) Scott Ogren	83
3	(Canada) Alain LaRoche	82
4	(United States) Scott Harrington	69
5	(France) Éric Laboureix	60

- Standings after 9 races.

== Ladies' standings ==
=== Overall ===
Rank		Points
1	(Switzerland) Conny Kissling	29
2	(Canada) Meredith Gardner	26
3	(United States) Melanie Palenik	25
4	(United States) Jan Bucher	12
5	(France) Raphaëlle Monod	11

- Standings after 40 races.

=== Moguls ===
Rank		Points
1	(France) Raphaëlle Monod	77
2	(United States) Donna Weinbrecht	76
3	(West Germany) Tatjana Mittermayer	68
4	(Italy) Silvia Marciandi	67
5	(Canada) LeeLee Morrison	66

- Standings after 10 races.

=== Aerials ===
Rank		Points
1	(France) Catherine Lombard	77
2	(West Germany) Sonja Reichart	77
3	(United States) Melanie Palenik	75
4	(Canada) Meredith Gardner	68
5	(Norway) Edel Hovland	50

- Standings after 10 races.

=== Ballet ===
Rank		Points
1	(United States) Jan Bucher	84
2	(Switzerland) Conny Kissling	81
3	(Canada) Lucie Barma	69
4	(United States) Betsy Reid	61
5	(Canada) Meredith Gardner	58

- Standings after 10 races.

=== Combined ===
Rank		Points
1	(Switzerland) Conny Kissling	54
2	(United States) Melanie Palenik	52
3	(Canada) Meredith Gardner	48
4	(United Kingdom) Jilly Curry	35
5	(France) Veronique Granier	15

- Standings after 10 races.
