= 1987–88 FIS Freestyle Ski World Cup =

1987-88 Freestyle Skiing Worldcup

Freestyle Skiing World Cup 1987/88
Discipline	Men	Women
Overall	(France) Éric Laboureix	(Switzerland) Conny Kissling
Moguls	(United States) Nelson Carmichael	(Norway) Stine Lise Hattestad
Aerials	(Canada) Jean-Marc Rozon	(Canada) Meredith Gardner (2)
Ballet	(West Germany) Hermann Reitberger	(France) Christine Rossi (3)
Combined	(Canada) Alain LaRoche (4)	(Switzerland) Conny Kissling

Competition
Locations	10	10
Individual	40	40

The 1987/88 FIS Freestyle Skiing World Cup was the ninth World Cup season in freestyle skiing organised by International Ski Federation. The season started on 11 December 1987 and ended on 20 March 1988. This season included four disciplines: aerials, moguls, ballet and combined.

== Men ==
=== Moguls ===
Num	Season	Date	Place	Event	Winner	Second	Third
65	1	11 December 1987	(France) Tignes	MO	(United States) Steve Desovich	(United States) Nelson Carmichael	(Sweden) Lasse Fahlén
66	2	20 December 1987	(France) La Plagne	MO	(United States) Nelson Carmichael	(France) Éric Berthon	(Finland) Martti Kellokumpu
67	3	9 January 1988	(Canada) Mont Gabriel	MO	(Finland) Martti Kellokumpu	(France) Edgar Grospiron	(Switzerland) Bernard Brandt
68	4	16 January 1988	(United States) Lake Placid	MO	(United States) Nelson Carmichael	(France) Edgar Grospiron	(United States) Steve Desovich
69	5	23 January 1988	(United States) Breckenridge	MO	(Norway) Hans Engelsen Eide	(United States) Nelson Carmichael	(France) Olivier Allamand
70	6	30 January 1988	(Japan) Inawashiro	MO	(Finland) Martti Kellokumpu	(France) Edgar Grospiron	(France) Éric Berthon
71	7	6 February 1988	(Japan) Madarao	MO	(United States) Bob Aldighieri	(France) Éric Berthon	(France) Edgar Grospiron
72	8	5 March 1988	(West Germany) Oberjoch	MO	(Switzerland) Bernard Brandt	(United States) Nelson Carmichael	(France) Éric Berthon
73	9	10 March 1988	(France) La Clusaz	MO	(Switzerland) Bernard Brandt	(Finland) Martti Kellokumpu	(United States) Nelson Carmichael
74	10	19 March 1988	(Switzerland) Meiringen-Hasliberg	MO	(France) Edgar Grospiron	(Switzerland) Jürg Biner	(United States) Nelson Carmichael

=== Ballet ===
Num	Season	Date	Place	Event	Winner	Second	Third
65	1	12 December 1987	(France) Tignes	AC	(Norway) Rune Kristiansen	(Canada) Richard Pierce	(France) Éric Laboureix
66	2	18 December 1987	(France) La Plagne	AC	(Norway) Rune Kristiansen	(United States) Lane Spina	(West Germany) Hermann Reitberger
67	3	8 January 1988	(Canada) Mont Gabriel	AC	(West Germany) Hermann Reitberger	(United States) Lane Spina	(West Germany) Klaus Mühlstein
68	4	15 January 1988	(United States) Lake Placid	AC	(Canada) Richard Pierce	(United States) Lane Spina	(Canada) Dave Walker
69	5	22 January 1988	(United States) Breckenridge	AC	(West Germany) Hermann Reitberger	(Norway) Rune Kristiansen	(Canada) Dave Walker
70	6	29 January 1988	(Japan) Inawashiro	AC	(West Germany) Hermann Reitberger	(Canada) Dave Walker	(United States) Roberto Franco
71	7	5 February 1988	(Japan) Madarao	AC	(West Germany) Hermann Reitberger	(Norway) Rune Kristiansen	(Canada) Richard Pierce
72	8	4 March 1988	(West Germany) Oberjoch	AC	(West Germany) Hermann Reitberger	(United States) Lane Spina	(Canada) Chris Simboli
73	9	11 March 1988	(France) La Clusaz	AC	(West Germany) Hubert Sewald	(West Germany) Hermann Reitberger	(United States) Lane Spina
74	10	18 March 1988	(Switzerland) Meiringen-Hasliberg	AC	(United States) Lane Spina	(West Germany) Hermann Reitberger	(Norway) Rune Kristiansen

=== Aerials ===
Num	Season	Date	Place	Event	Winner	Second	Third
64	1	13 December 1987	(France) Tignes	AE	(Canada) Lloyd Langlois	(France) Didier Méda	(Canada) Philippe LaRoche
65	2	19 December 1987	(France) La Plagne	AE	(Canada) Philippe LaRoche	(United States) Kris Feddersen	(France) Didier Méda
66	3	10 January 1988	(Canada) Mont Gabriel	AE	(Canada) Jean-Marc Rozon	(France) Didier Méda	(Canada) Alain LaRoche
67	4	17 January 1988	(United States) Lake Placid	AE	(Canada) Jean-Marc Rozon	(United States) Kris Feddersen	(Canada) Philippe LaRoche
68	5	24 January 1988	(United States) Breckenridge	AE	(Canada) Philippe LaRoche	(Canada) André Ouimet	(Canada) Lloyd Langlois
69	6	31 January 1988	(Japan) Inawashiro	AE	(Canada) Lloyd Langlois	(Canada) André Ouimet	(Canada) Jean-Marc Rozon
70	7	6 March 1988	(West Germany) Oberjoch	AE	(Canada) Philippe LaRoche	(Canada) Lloyd Langlois	(Canada) Jean-Marc Rozon
71	8	12 March 1988	(France) La Clusaz	AE	(Canada) Jean-Marc Rozon	(Canada) Lloyd Langlois	(Austria) Thomas Überall
72	9	13 March 1988	(France) La Clusaz	AE	(Canada) Jean-Marc Rozon	(Canada) Philippe LaRoche	(Switzerland) Andreas Schönbächler
73	10	20 March 1988	(Switzerland) Meiringen-Hasliberg	AE	(Canada) Jean-Marc Rozon	(Canada) Lloyd Langlois	(Canada) Philippe LaRoche

=== Combined ===
Num	Season	Date	Place	Event	Winner	Second	Third
59	1	13 December 1987	(France) Tignes	CO	(France) Éric Laboureix	(Canada) Alain LaRoche	(Canada) Chris Simboli
60	2	20 December 1987	(France) La Plagne	CO	(France) Éric Laboureix	(United States) John Witt	(Canada) Chris Simboli
61	3	10 January 1988	(Canada) Mont Gabriel	CO	(Canada) Alain LaRoche	(United States) John Witt	(France) Éric Laboureix
62	4	17 January 1988	(United States) Lake Placid	CO	(France) Éric Laboureix	(Canada) Alain LaRoche	(Canada) Chris Simboli
63	5	24 January 1988	(United States) Breckenridge	CO	(United States) John Witt	(Canada) Alain LaRoche	(Canada) Chris Simboli
64	6	31 January 1988	(Japan) Inawashiro	CO	(Canada) Alain LaRoche	(United States) John Witt	(France) Éric Laboureix
65	7	6 March 1988	(West Germany) Oberjoch	CO	(Canada) Chris Simboli	(United States) John Witt	(France) Éric Laboureix
66	8	12 March 1988	(France) La Clusaz	CO	(France) Éric Laboureix	(United States) John Witt	(Canada) Chris Simboli
67	9	13 March 1988	(France) La Clusaz	CO	(Canada) Alain LaRoche	(United States) John Witt	(United States) Scott Ogren
68	10	20 March 1988	(Switzerland) Meiringen-Hasliberg	CO	(Canada) Chris Simboli	(Canada) Alain LaRoche	(United States) John Witt

== Ladies ==
=== Moguls ===
Num	Season	Date	Place	Event	Winner	Second	Third
65	1	11 December 1987	(France) Tignes	MO	(United States) Liz McIntyre	(Switzerland) Conny Kissling	(United States) Hayley Wolff
66	2	20 December 1987	(France) La Plagne	MO	(West Germany) Tatjana Mittermayer	(Sweden) Lise Benberg	(Canada) LeeLee Morrison
67	3	9 January 1988	(Canada) Mont Gabriel	MO	(Canada) LeeLee Morrison	(Italy) Petra Moroder	(West Germany) Tatjana Mittermayer
68	4	16 January 1988	(United States) Lake Placid	MO	(Italy) Silvia Marciandi	(Italy) Petra Moroder	(Canada) Meredith Gardner
69	5	23 January 1988	(United States) Breckenridge	MO	(France) Raphaëlle Monod	(Canada) LeeLee Morrison	(West Germany) Tatjana Mittermayer
70	6	30 January 1988	(Japan) Inawashiro	MO	(Canada) LeeLee Morrison	(France) Raphaëlle Monod	(Norway) Stine Lise Hattestad
71	7	6 February 1988	(Japan) Madarao	MO	(Norway) Stine Lise Hattestad	(Switzerland) Conny Kissling	(United States) Donna Weinbrecht
72	8	5 March 1988	(West Germany) Oberjoch	MO	(Norway) Stine Lise Hattestad	(Italy) Silvia Marciandi	(Italy) Petra Moroder
73	9	10 March 1988	(France) La Clusaz	MO	(France) Raphaëlle Monod	(Norway) Stine Lise Hattestad	(West Germany) Tatjana Mittermayer
74	10	19 March 1988	(Switzerland) Meiringen-Hasliberg	MO	(West Germany) Tatjana Mittermayer	(Norway) Stine Lise Hattestad	(United States) Donna Weinbrecht

=== Ballet ===
Num	Season	Date	Place	Event	Winner	Second	Third
66	1	12 December 1987	(France) Tignes	AC	(United States) Jan Bucher	(France) Christine Rossi	(Switzerland) Conny Kissling
67	2	18 December 1987	(France) La Plagne	AC	(France) Christine Rossi	(United States) Jan Bucher	(Switzerland) Conny Kissling
68	3	8 January 1988	(Canada) Mont Gabriel	AC	(Switzerland) Conny Kissling	(United States) Jan Bucher	(France) Christine Rossi
69	4	15 January 1988	(United States) Lake Placid	AC	(United States) Jan Bucher	(United States) Ellen Breen	(United States) Betsy Reid
70	5	22 January 1988	(United States) Breckenridge	AC	(France) Christine Rossi	(United States) Jan Bucher	(Switzerland) Conny Kissling
71	6	29 January 1988	(Japan) Inawashiro	AC	(France) Christine Rossi	(United States) Jan Bucher	(Switzerland) Conny Kissling
72	7	5 February 1988	(Japan) Madarao	AC	(France) Christine Rossi	(United States) Jan Bucher	(United States) Ellen Breen
73	8	4 March 1988	(West Germany) Oberjoch	AC	(France) Christine Rossi	(United States) Jan Bucher	(Switzerland) Conny Kissling
74	9	11 March 1988	(France) La Clusaz	AC	(United States) Jan Bucher	(France) Christine Rossi	(Switzerland) Conny Kissling
75	10	18 March 1988	(Switzerland) Meiringen-Hasliberg	AC	(Switzerland) Conny Kissling	(France) Christine Rossi	(Canada) Lucie Barma

=== Aerials ===
Num	Season	Date	Place	Event	Winner	Second	Third
65	1	13 December 1987	(France) Tignes	AE	(West Germany) Sonja Reichart	(Canada) Meredith Gardner	(Sweden) Susanna Antonsson
66	2	19 December 1987	(France) La Plagne	AE	(Sweden) Susanna Antonsson	(West Germany) Sonja Reichart	(United States) Maria Quitana
67	3	10 January 1988	(Canada) Mont Gabriel	AE	(Canada) Meredith Gardner	(Canada) Anna Fraser	(Japan) Hiroko Fujii
68	4	17 January 1988	(United States) Lake Placid	AE	(Canada) Meredith Gardner	(Canada) Anna Fraser	(Sweden) Carin Hernskog
69	5	24 January 1988	(United States) Breckenridge	AE	(Sweden) Carin Hernskog	(Japan) Hiroko Fujii	(United States) Jodie Spiegel
70	6	31 January 1988	(Japan) Inawashiro	AE	(France) Catherine Lombard	(Sweden) Carin Hernskog	(Japan) Hiroko Fujii
71	7	8 February 1988	(Japan) Madarao	AE	(Canada) Meredith Gardner	(West Germany) Sonja Reichart	(France) Catherine Lombard
72	8	6 March 1988	(West Germany) Oberjoch	AE	(West Germany) Sonja Reichart	(Sweden) Susanna Antonsson	(France) Catherine Lombard
73	9	12 March 1988	(France) La Clusaz	AE	(Canada) Meredith Gardner	(United States) Jodie Spiegel	(United States) Maria Quintana
74	10	20 March 1988	(Switzerland) Meiringen-Hasliberg	AE	(Canada) Meredith Gardner	(Japan) Hiroko Fujii	(France) Catherine Lombard

=== Combined ===
Num	Season	Date	Place	Event	Winner	Second	Third
60	1	13 December 1987	(France) Tignes	CO	(Switzerland) Conny Kissling	(Canada) Meredith Gardner	(United States) Melanie Palenik
61	2	20 December 1987	(France) La Plagne	CO	(Switzerland) Conny Kissling	(United States) Melanie Palenik	(Canada) Meredith Gardner
62	3	10 January 1988	(Canada) Mont Gabriel	CO	(Switzerland) Conny Kissling	(Canada) Meredith Gardner	(United States) Melanie Palenik
63	4	17 January 1988	(United States) Lake Placid	CO	(Canada) Meredith Gardner	(Switzerland) Conny Kissling	(United States) Melanie Palenik
64	5	24 January 1988	(United States) Breckenridge	CO	(United States) Melanie Palenik	(Switzerland) Conny Kissling	(Canada) Meredith Gardner
65	6	31 January 1988	(Japan) Inawashiro	CO	(Canada) Meredith Gardner	(United States) Melanie Palenik	(Switzerland) Conny Kissling
66	7	8 February 1988	(Japan) Madarao	CO	(Switzerland) Conny Kissling	(Canada) Meredith Gardner	(United States) Melanie Palenik
67	8	6 March 1988	(West Germany) Oberjoch	CO	(Switzerland) Conny Kissling	(Canada) Meredith Gardner	(United States) Melanie Palenik
68	9	12 March 1988	(France) La Clusaz	CO	(Switzerland) Conny Kissling	(Canada) Meredith Gardner	(United States) Melanie Palenik
69	10	20 March 1988	(Switzerland) Meiringen-Hasliberg	CO	(Canada) Meredith Gardner	(Switzerland) Conny Kissling	(United States) Melanie Palenik

== Men's standings ==
=== Overall ===
Rank		Points
1	(France) Éric Laboureix	56
2	(Canada) Chris Simboli	55
3	(Canada) Alain LaRoche	52
4	(United States) John Witt	49
5	(United States) Scott Ogren	32

- Standings after 40 races.

=== Moguls ===
Rank		Points
1	(United States) Nelson Carmichael	168
2	(France) Éric Berthon	157
3	(France) Edgar Grospiron	155
4	(Finland) Martti Kellokumpu	150
5	(United States) Steve Desovich	135

- Standings after 10 races.

=== Aerials ===
Rank		Points
1	(Canada) Jean-Marc Rozon	171
2	(Canada) Philippe LaRoche	168
3	(Canada) Lloyd Langlois	153
4	(United States) Kris Feddersen	153
5	(France) Jean-Marc Bacquin	147

- Standings after 10 races.

=== Ballet ===
Rank		Points
1	(Germany) Hermann Reitberger	173
2	(United States) Lane Spina	166
3	(Norway) Rune Kristiansen	164
4	(Canada) Richard Pierce	157
5	(Canada) Dave Walker	157

- Standings after 10 races.

=== Combined ===
Rank		Points
1	(Canada) Alain LaRoche	102
2	(United States) John Witt	99
3	(France) Éric Laboureix	98
4	(Canada) Chris Simboli	95
5	(United States) Scott Ogren	77

- Standings after 10 races.

== Ladies' standings ==
=== Overall ===
Rank		Points
1	(Switzerland) Conny Kissling	30
2	(Canada) Meredith Gardner	29
3	(United States) Melanie Palenik	21
4	(France) Christine Rossi	12
5	(United States) Jan Bucher	11

- Standings after 40 races.

=== Moguls ===
Rank		Points
1	(Norway) Stine Lise Hattestad	72
2	(West Germany) Tatjana Mittermayer	72
3	(Canada) LeeLee Morrison	62
4	(France) Raphaëlle Monod	61
5	(Italy) Silvia Marciandi	60

- Standings after 10 races.

=== Aerials ===
Rank		Points
1	(Canada) Meredith Gardner	80
2	(West Germany) Sonja Reichart	71
3	(France) Catherine Lombard	64
4	(Japan) Hiroko Fujii	64
5	(Sweden) Susanna Antonsson	54

- Standings after 10 races.

=== Ballet ===
Rank		Points
1	(France) Christine Rossi	82
2	(United States) Jan Bucher	80
3	(Switzerland) Conny Kissling	74
4	(United States) Ellen Breen	66
5	(Canada) Lucie Barma	58

- Standings after 10 races.

=== Combined ===
Rank		Points
1	(Switzerland) Conny Kissling	55
2	(Canada) Meredith Gardner	52
3	(United States) Melanie Palenik	46
4	(United Kingdom) Jilly Curry	35
5	(Soviet Union) Vasilisa Semenchuk	14

- Standings after 10 races.
