= 1989–90 FIS Freestyle Ski World Cup =

Freestyle skiing competitive season

Freestyle Skiing World Cup 1989/90
Discipline	Men	Women
Overall	(France) Éric Laboureix	(Switzerland) Conny Kissling (10)
Moguls	(France) Edgar Grospiron	(United States) Donna Weinbrecht
Aerials	(France) Jean-Marc Bacquin	(West Germany) Sonja Reichart
Ballet	(Italy) Roberto Franco	(Switzerland) Conny Kissling
Combined	(France) Éric Laboureix	(Switzerland) Conny Kissling

Competition
Locations	9	9
Individual	36	36

The 1989/90 FIS Freestyle Skiing World Cup was the eleventh World Cup season in freestyle skiing organised by International Ski Federation. The season started on 8 December 1989 and ended on 16 March 1990. This season included four disciplines: aerials, moguls, ballet and combined.

== Men ==
=== Moguls ===
Num	Season	Date	Place	Event	Winner	Second	Third
85	1	15 December 1989	(France) La Plagne	MO	(France) Edgar Grospiron	(France) Olivier Allamand	(Switzerland) Jürg Biner
86	2	16 December 1989	(France) La Plagne	MO	(Switzerland) Bernard Brandt	(France) Olivier Allamand	(United States) Nelson Carmichael
87	3	6 January 1990	(Canada) Mont Gabriel	MO	(France) Edgar Grospiron	(France) Olivier Allamand	(Switzerland) Bernard Brandt
88	4	13 January 1990	(United States) Lake Placid	MO	(France) Edgar Grospiron	(France) Olivier Allamand	(United States) Chuck Martin
89	5	20 January 1990	(United States) Breckenridge	MO	(United States) Nelson Carmichael	(France) Edgar Grospiron	(France) Éric Berthon
90	6	28 January 1990	(Canada) Calgary	MO	(France) Éric Berthon	(United States) Nelson Carmichael	(France) Edgar Grospiron
91	7	10 February 1990	(Japan) Inawashiro	MO	(France) Edgar Grospiron	(Norway) Hans Engelsen Eide	(United States) Chuck Martin
92	8	18 February 1990	(Japan) Iizuna kogen	MO	(France) Edgar Grospiron	(France) Olivier Allamand	(France) Éric Berthon
93	9	16 March 1990	(France) La Clusaz	MO	(France) Éric Berthon	(Canada) John Smart	(United States) Rick Emerson

=== Ballet ===
Num	Season	Date	Place	Event	Winner	Second	Third
85	1	8 December 1989	(France) Tignes	BA	(Norway) Rune Kristiansen	(Switzerland) Heini Baumgartner	(Italy) Roberto Franco
86	2	14 December 1989	(France) La Plagne	BA	(Italy) Roberto Franco	(West Germany) Hermann Reitberger	(Switzerland) Heini Baumgartner
87	3	5 January 1990	(Canada) Mont Gabriel	BA	(United States) Lane Spina	(Italy) Roberto Franco	(West Germany) Hermann Reitberger
88	4	12 January 1990	(United States) Lake Placid	BA	(West Germany) Armin Weiss	(Italy) Roberto Franco	(West Germany) Hermann Reitberger
89	5	19 January 1990	(United States) Breckenridge	BA	(United States) Lane Spina	(Norway) Rune Kristiansen	(West Germany) Hermann Reitberger
90	6	26 January 1990	(Canada) Calgary	BA	(Norway) Rune Kristiansen	(Italy) Roberto Franco	(Canada) Craig Young
91	7	9 February 1990	(Japan) Inawashiro	BA	(Italy) Roberto Franco	(Norway) Rune Kristiansen	(Canada) Dave Walker
92	8	17 February 1990	(Japan) Iizuna kogen	BA	(West Germany) Armin Weiss	(Canada) Richard Pierce	(Italy) Roberto Franco
93	9	13 March 1990	(France) La Clusaz	BA	(West Germany) Hermann Reitberger	(Italy) Roberto Franco	(Norway) Rune Kristiansen

=== Aerials ===
Num	Season	Date	Place	Event	Winner	Second	Third
83	1	9 December 1989	(France) Tignes	AE	(United States) Russ Magnanti	(Canada) Philippe LaRoche	(Canada) John Ross
84	2	17 December 1989	(France) La Plagne	AE	(France) Jean-Marc Bacquin	(Canada) Jean-Marc Rozon	(United States) Russ Magnanti
85	3	7 January 1990	(Canada) Mont Gabriel	AE	(Canada) Philippe LaRoche	(United States) Trace Worthington	(Canada) John Ross
86	4	14 January 1990	(United States) Lake Placid	AE	(Canada) Philippe LaRoche	(France) Jean-Marc Bacquin	(United States) Kris Feddersen
87	5	21 January 1990	(United States) Breckenridge	AE	(Canada) Jean-Marc Rozon	(Canada) Philippe LaRoche	(France) Jean-Marc Bacquin
88	6	27 January 1990	(Canada) Calgary	AE	(United States) Russ Magnanti	(France) Jean-Marc Bacquin	(United States) Kris Feddersen
89	7	11 February 1990	(Japan) Inawashiro	AE	(France) Jean-Marc Bacquin	(Switzerland) Michel Roth	(France) Didier Méda
90	8	18 February 1990	(Japan) Iizuna kogen	AE	(Switzerland) Michel Roth	(France) Jean-Marc Bacquin	(United States) Russ Magnanti
91	9	14 March 1990	(France) La Clusaz	AE	(United States) Trace Worthington	(Canada) John Ross	(United States) Kris Feddersen

=== Combined ===
Num	Season	Date	Place	Event	Winner	Second	Third
78	1	16 December 1989	(France) La Plagne	CO	(France) Éric Laboureix	(United States) Trace Worthington	(Canada) Jeff Viola
79	2	17 December 1989	(France) La Plagne	CO	(France) Éric Laboureix	(France) Olivier Allamand	(Canada) Jeff Viola
80	3	7 January 1990	(Canada) Mont Gabriel	CO	(France) Olivier Allamand	(France) Éric Laboureix	(United States) Trace Worthington
81	4	14 January 1990	(United States) Lake Placid	CO	(France) Éric Laboureix	(France) Olivier Allamand	(Soviet Union) Sergey Shupletsov
82	5	21 January 1990	(United States) Breckenridge	CO	(France) Éric Laboureix	(France) Olivier Allamand	(Canada) Jeff Viola
83	6	28 January 1990	(Canada) Calgary	CO	(France) Éric Laboureix	(France) Olivier Allamand	(United States) Trace Worthington
84	7	11 February 1990	(Japan) Inawashiro	CO	(France) Olivier Allamand	(France) Éric Laboureix	(United States) Trace Worthington
85	8	18 February 1990	(Japan) Iizuna kogen	CO	(France) Éric Laboureix	(France) Olivier Allamand	(Canada) Jeff Viola
86	9	16 March 1990	(France) La Clusaz	CO	(United States) Trace Worthington	(Canada) Jeff Viola	(Austria) Hugo Bonatti

== Ladies ==
=== Moguls ===
Num	Season	Date	Place	Event	Winner	Second	Third
85	1	15 December 1989	(France) La Plagne	MO	(France) Raphaëlle Monod	(Canada) LeeLee Morrison	(United States) Donna Weinbrecht
86	2	16 December 1989	(France) La Plagne	MO	(United States) Donna Weinbrecht	(West Germany) Tatjana Mittermayer	(Italy) Petra Moroder
87	3	6 January 1990	(Canada) Mont Gabriel	MO	(United States) Donna Weinbrecht	(Canada) LeeLee Morrison	(France) Raphaëlle Monod
88	4	13 January 1990	(United States) Lake Placid	MO	(United States) Donna Weinbrecht	(United States) Rachel Schochet	(West Germany) Birgit Keppler-Stein
89	5	20 January 1990	(United States) Breckenridge	MO	(United States) Donna Weinbrecht	(West Germany) Tatjana Mittermayer	(West Germany) Birgit Keppler-Stein
90	6	28 January 1990	(Canada) Calgary	MO	(United States) Donna Weinbrecht	(France) Raphaëlle Monod	(West Germany) Birgit Keppler-Stein
91	7	10 February 1990	(Japan) Inawashiro	MO	(United States) Donna Weinbrecht	(West Germany) Tatjana Mittermayer	(Italy) Petra Moroder
92	8	18 February 1990	(Japan) Iizuna	MO	(United States) Donna Weinbrecht	(Canada) LeeLee Morrison	(West Germany) Tatjana Mittermayer
93	9	16 March 1990	(France) La Clusaz	MO	(United States) Donna Weinbrecht	(West Germany) Tatjana Mittermayer	(France) Raphaëlle Monod

=== Ballet ===
Num	Season	Date	Place	Event	Winner	Second	Third
86	1	8 December 1989	(France) Tignes	BA	(United States) Jan Bucher	(United Kingdom) Julia Snell	(Switzerland) Conny Kissling
87	2	14 December 1989	(France) La Plagne	BA	(Switzerland) Conny Kissling	(United States) Jan Bucher	(Switzerland) Monika Kamber
88	3	5 January 1990	(Canada) Mont Gabriel	BA	(Switzerland) Conny Kissling	(United States) Karen Hunter	(United States) Ellen Breen
89	4	12 January 1990	(United States) Lake Placid	BA	(Switzerland) Conny Kissling	(United States) Karen Hunter	(Sweden) Åsa Magnusson
90	5	19 January 1990	(United States) Breckenridge	BA	(Switzerland) Conny Kissling	(United States) Karen Hunter	(Sweden) Åsa Magnusson
91	6	26 January 1990	(Canada) Calgary	BA	(United States) Ellen Breen	(Switzerland) Conny Kissling	(Switzerland) Monika Kamber
92	7	9 February 1990	(Japan) Inawashiro	BA	(Switzerland) Conny Kissling	(Canada) Lucie Barma	(Switzerland) Monika Kamber
93	8	17 February 1990	(Japan) Iizuna	BA	(Switzerland) Conny Kissling	(Canada) Lucie Barma	(United States) Ellen Breen
94	9	13 March 1990	(France) La Clusaz	BA	(Switzerland) Conny Kissling	(Switzerland) Monika Kamber	(Sweden) Åsa Magnusson

=== Aerials ===
Num	Season	Date	Place	Event	Winner	Second	Third
85	1	9 December 1989	(France) Tignes	AE	(West Germany) Sonja Reichart	(West Germany) Elfie Simchen	(Australia) Kirstie Marshall
86	2	17 December 1989	(France) La Plagne	AE	(West Germany) Sonja Reichart	(France) Catherine Lombard	(Australia) Kirstie Marshall
87	3	7 January 1990	(Canada) Mont Gabriel	AE	(West Germany) Sonja Reichart	(Switzerland) Conny Kissling	(Australia) Kirstie Marshall
88	4	14 January 1990	(United States) Lake Placid	AE	(West Germany) Sonja Reichart	(Japan) Chizuko Kudo	(West Germany) Elfie Simchen
89	5	21 January 1990	(United States) Breckenridge	AE	(Australia) Kirstie Marshall	(West Germany) Sonja Reichart	(West Germany) Elfie Simchen
90	6	27 January 1990	(Canada) Calgary	AE	(France) Catherine Lombard	(West Germany) Sonja Reichart	(Australia) Kirstie Marshall
91	7	11 February 1990	(Japan) Inawashiro	AE	(Switzerland) Conny Kissling	(Japan) Chizuko Kudo	(France) Catherine Lombard
92	8	18 February 1990	(Japan) Iizuna	AE	(West Germany) Elfie Simchen	(Japan) Chizuko Kudo	(France) Catherine Lombard
93	9	14 March 1990	(France) La Clusaz	AE	(West Germany) Sonja Reichart	(Switzerland) Sabine Horvath	(France) Catherine Lombard

=== Combined ===
Num	Season	Date	Place	Event	Winner	Second	Third
80	1	16 December 1989	(France) La Plagne	CO	(Switzerland) Conny Kissling	(United Kingdom) Jilly Curry	(Australia) Tarsha Ebbern
81	2	17 December 1989	(France) La Plagne	CO	(Switzerland) Conny Kissling	(Australia) Tarsha Ebbern	(United Kingdom) Jilly Curry
82	3	7 January 1990	(Canada) Mont Gabriel	CO	(Switzerland) Conny Kissling	(United Kingdom) Jilly Curry	(Soviet Union) Natalia Orekhova
83	4	14 January 1990	(United States) Lake Placid	CO	(Switzerland) Conny Kissling	(United States) Kristean Porter	(Soviet Union) Natalia Orekhova
84	5	21 January 1990	(United States) Breckenridge	CO	(Switzerland) Conny Kissling	(United Kingdom) Jilly Curry	(United States) Tamara Saint Germain
85	6	28 January 1990	(Canada) Calgary	CO	(Switzerland) Conny Kissling	(Canada) Katherina Kubenk	information is not available
86	7	11 February 1990	(Japan) Inawashiro	CO	(Switzerland) Conny Kissling	(Canada) Katherina Kubenk	(United States) Kristean Porter
87	8	18 February 1990	(Japan) Iizuna	CO	(Switzerland) Conny Kissling	(United States) Kristean Porter	(Australia) Tarsha Ebbern
88	9	16 March 1990	(France) La Clusaz	CO	(United Kingdom) Jilly Curry	(Australia) Tarsha Ebbern	(United States) Kristean Porter

== Men's standings ==
=== Overall ===
Rank		Points
1	(France) Éric Laboureix	58
2	(France) Olivier Allamand	53
3	(United States) Trace Worthington	47
4	(Canada) Jeff Viola	39
5	(Canada) Richard Pierce	34

- Standings after 36 races.

=== Moguls ===
Rank		Points
1	(France) Edgar Grospiron	149
2	(France) Olivier Allamand	142
3	(France) Éric Berthon	136
4	(Norway) Hans Engelsen Eide	122
5	(France) Bruno Bertrand	120

- Standings after 9 races.

=== Aerials ===
Rank		Points
1	(France) Jean-Marc Bacquin	145
2	(Canada) Philippe LaRoche	142
3	(United States) Russ Magnanti	138
4	(Canada) John Ross	135
5	(United States) Kris Feddersen	129

- Standings after 9 races.

=== Ballet ===
Rank		Points
1	(Italy) Roberto Franco	146
2	(Norway) Rune Kristiansen	143
3	(West Germany) Hermann Reitberger	140
4	(West Germany) Armin Weiss	126
5	(Switzerland) Heini Baumgartner	125

- Standings after 9 races.

=== Combined ===
Rank		Points
1	(France) Éric Laboureix	90
2	(France) Olivier Allamand	86
3	(United States) Trace Worthington	80
4	(Canada) Jeff Viola	78
5	(Spain) Rafel Herrero	68

- Standings after 9 races.

== Ladies' standings ==
=== Overall ===
Rank		Points
1	(Switzerland) Conny Kissling	35
2	(United States) Donna Weinbrecht	12
3	(West Germany) Sonja Reichart	12
4	(United Kingdom) Jilly Curry	11
5	(France) Catherine Lombard	10

- Standings after 36 races.

=== Moguls ===
Rank		Points
1	(United States) Donna Weinbrecht	73
2	(West Germany) Tatjana Mittermayer	63
3	(France) Raphaëlle Monod	57
4	(West Germany) Birgit Keppler-Stein	55
5	(Italy) Petra Moroder	47

- Standings after 9 races.

=== Aerials ===
Rank		Points
1	(West Germany) Sonja Reichart	72
2	(France) Catherine Lombard	62
3	(Australia) Kirstie Marshall	61
4	(West Germany) Elfie Simchen	57
5	(Switzerland) Conny Kissling	57

- Standings after 9 races.

=== Ballet ===
Rank		Points
1	(Switzerland) Conny Kissling	72
2	(Switzerland) Monika Kamber	59
3	(Sweden) Åsa Magnusson	57
4	(United States) Ellen Breen	57
5	(United States) Karen Hunter	45

- Standings after 9 races.

=== Combined ===
Rank		Points
1	(Switzerland) Conny Kissling	48
2	(United Kingdom) Jilly Curry	40
3	(Canada) Katherina Kubenk	33
4	(Australia) Tarsha Ebbern	26
5	(United States) Kristean Porter	26

- Standings after 9 races.
