= 1986–87 FIS Freestyle Ski World Cup =

Freestyle skiing competitive season

Freestyle Skiing World Cup 1986/87
Discipline	Men	Women
Overall	(France) Éric Laboureix	(Switzerland) Conny Kissling
Moguls	(Finland) Martti Kellokumpu	(France) Raphaëlle Monod
Aerials	(Canada) Jean-Marc Rozon	(West Germany) Sonja Reichart
Ballet	(West Germany) Hermann Reitberger	(France) Christine Rossi
Combined	(France) Éric Laboureix	(Switzerland) Conny Kissling

Competition
Locations	9	9
Individual	33	34

The 1986/87 FIS Freestyle Skiing World Cup was the eight World Cup season in freestyle skiing organised by International Ski Federation. The season started on 8 December 1986 and ended on 27 March 1987. This season included four disciplines: aerials, moguls, ballet and combined.

== Men ==
=== Moguls ===
Num	Season	Date	Place	Event	Winner	Second	Third
56	1	9 December 1986	(France) Tignes	MO	(Finland) Martti Kellokumpu	(France) Éric Berthon	(France) Philippe Deiber
57	2	10 January 1987	(Canada) Mont Gabriel	MO	(France) Philippe Deiber	(Finland) Martti Kellokumpu	(Norway) Hans Engelsen Eide
58	3	16 January 1987	(United States) Lake Placid	MO	(Finland) Martti Kellokumpu	(United States) Steve Desovich	(France) Éric Berthon
59	4	23 January 1987	(United States) Breckenridge	MO	(France) Philippe Deiber	(Norway) Hans Engelsen Eide	(France) Éric Berthon
60	5	30 January 1987	(Canada) Calgary	MO	(United States) Steve Desovich	(France) Éric Berthon	(United States) Nelson Carmichael
61	6	21 February 1987	(Austria) Mariazell	MO	(United States) Steve Desovich	(France) Éric Berthon	(France) Éric Laboureix
62	7	28 February 1987	(Norway) Voss	MO	(Norway) Hans Engelsen Eide	(Finland) Martti Kellokumpu	(France) Éric Berthon
63	8	7 March 1987	(West Germany) Oberjoch	MO	(United States) Steve Desovich	(United States) Cooper Schell	(France) Éric Berthon
64	9	23 March 1987	(France) La Clusaz	MO	(Finland) Martti Kellokumpu	(France) Edgar Grospiron	(France) Éric Berthon

=== Aerials ===
Num	Season	Date	Place	Event	Winner	Second	Third
55	1	11 December 1986	(France) Tignes	AE	(France) Didier Méda	(Canada) Lloyd Langlois	(Switzerland) Andreas Schönbächler
56	2	11 January 1987	(Canada) Mont Gabriel	AE	(Canada) Lloyd Langlois	(France) Didier Méda	(France) Jean-Marc Bacquin
57	3	17 January 1987	(United States) Lake Placid	AE	(Canada) Jean-Marc Rozon	(Canada) Lloyd Langlois	(France) Didier Méda
58	4	24 January 1987	(United States) Breckenridge	AE	(Canada) Lloyd Langlois	(Canada) Jean-Marc Rozon	(France) Didier Méda
59	5	1 February 1987	(Canada) Calgary	AE	(Canada) Jean-Marc Rozon	(United States) Kris Feddersen	(Canada) André Ouimet
60	6	22 February 1987	(Austria) Mariazell	AE	(Canada) Jean-Marc Rozon	(Canada) Lloyd Langlois	(Switzerland) Andreas Schönbächler
61	7	1 March 1987	(Norway) Voss	AE	(Canada) Lloyd Langlois	(Canada) Jean-Marc Rozon	(United States) Kris Feddersen
62	8	8 March 1987	(West Germany) Oberjoch	AE	(Canada) Jean-Marc Rozon	(Canada) Lloyd Langlois	(United States) Kris Feddersen
63	9	27 March 1987	(France) La Clusaz	AE	(Canada) Jean-Marc Rozon	(Canada) Lloyd Langlois	(Canada) Alain LaRoche

=== Combined ===
Num	Season	Date	Place	Event	Winner	Second	Third
51	1	12 December 1986	(France) Tignes	CO	(France) Éric Laboureix	(United States) John Witt	(Canada) Chris Simboli
52	2	11 January 1987	(Canada) Mont Gabriel	CO	(United States) John Witt	(France) Éric Laboureix	(United States) Chuck Martin
53	3	22 January 1987	(United States) Breckenridge	CO	(France) Éric Laboureix	(Canada) Chris Simboli	(United States) John Witt
54	4	24 January 1987	(United States) Breckenridge	CO	(France) Éric Laboureix	(Canada) Alain LaRoche	(Canada) Chris Simboli
55	5	1 February 1987	(Canada) Calgary	CO	(Canada) Alain LaRoche	(United States) John Witt	(United States) Chuck Martin
56	6	1 March 1987	(Norway) Voss	CO	(United States) John Witt	(France) Éric Laboureix	(Canada) Alain LaRoche
57	7	8 March 1987	(West Germany) Oberjoch	CO	(France) Éric Laboureix	(United States) John Witt	(Canada) Chris Simboli
58	8	27 March 1987	(France) La Clusaz	CO	(France) Éric Laboureix	(United States) John Witt	(Canada) Alain LaRoche

=== Ballet ===
Num	Season	Date	Place	Event	Winner	Second	Third
58	1	12 December 1986	(France) Tignes	AC	(United States) Lane Spina	(Canada) Richard Pierce	(West Germany) Hermann Reitberger
59	2	21 January 1987	(United States) Breckenridge	AC	(West Germany) Hermann Reitberger	(United States) Lane Spina	(Italy) Peter Mahlknecht
60	3	22 January 1987	(United States) Breckenridge	AC	(United States) Lane Spina	(Italy) Peter Mahlknecht	(Canada) Chris Simboli
61	4	30 January 1987	(Canada) Calgary	AC	(West Germany) Hermann Reitberger	(Canada) Chris Simboli	(Norway) Rune Kristiansen
62	5	27 February 1987	(Norway) Voss	AC	(West Germany) Hermann Reitberger	(United States) Lane Spina	(Canada) Dave Walker
63	6	6 March 1987	(West Germany) Oberjoch	AC	(West Germany) Hermann Reitberger	(United States) Lane Spina	(Canada) Dave Walker
64	7	25 March 1987	(France) La Clusaz	AC	(West Germany) Hermann Reitberger	(United States) Lane Spina	(Italy) Peter Mahlknecht

== Ladies ==
=== Moguls ===
Num	Season	Date	Place	Event	Winner	Second	Third
56	1	8 December 1986	(France) Tignes	MO	(France) Raphaëlle Monod	(Italy) Silvia Marciandi	(Norway) Stine Lise Hattestad
57	2	9 December 1986	(France) Tignes	MO	(Italy) Silvia Marciandi	(France) Raphaëlle Monod	(United States) Hayley Wolff
58	3	10 January 1987	(Canada) Mont Gabriel	MO	(United States) Hayley Wolff	(France) Raphaëlle Monod	(Norway) Stine Lise Hattestad
59	4	23 January 1987	(United States) Breckenridge	MO	(Canada) LeeLee Morrison	(West Germany) Tatjana Mittermayer	(France) Raphaëlle Monod
60	5	30 January 1987	(Canada) Calgary	MO	(France) Raphaëlle Monod	(Switzerland) Conny Kissling	(Norway) Stine Lise Hattestad
61	6	21 February 1987	(Austria) Mariazell	MO	(Switzerland) Conny Kissling	(West Germany) Tatjana Mittermayer	(Norway) Stine Lise Hattestad
62	7	28 February 1987	(Norway) Voss	MO	(Switzerland) Conny Kissling	(Sweden) Lise Benberg	(Norway) Stine Lise Hattestad
63	8	7 March 1987	(West Germany) Oberjoch	MO	(West Germany) Tatjana Mittermayer	(Norway) Stine Lise Hattestad	(Sweden) Lise Benberg
64	9	23 March 1987	(France) La Clusaz	MO	(France) Raphaëlle Monod	(Norway) Stine Lise Hattestad	(United States) Hayley Wolff

=== Aerials ===
Num	Season	Date	Place	Event	Winner	Second	Third
56	1	11 December 1986	(France) Tignes	AE	(Sweden) Carin Hernskog	(France) Catherine Lombard	(West Germany) Sonja Reichart
57	2	11 January 1987	(Canada) Mont Gabriel	AE	(Sweden) Carin Hernskog	(France) Catherine Lombard	(West Germany) Sonja Reichart
58	3	17 January 1987	(United States) Lake Placid	AE	(France) Catherine Lombard	(West Germany) Sonja Reichart	(Sweden) Carin Hernskog
59	4	24 January 1987	(United States) Breckenridge	AE	(West Germany) Sonja Reichart	(Canada) Anna Fraser	(United States) Maria Quintana
60	5	1 February 1987	(Canada) Calgary	AE	(Canada) Anna Fraser	(Austria) Andrea Amann	(France) Catherine Lombard
61	6	22 February 1987	(Austria) Mariazell	AE	(United States) Maria Quintana	(Sweden) Susanna Antonsson	(France) Catherine Lombard
62	7	1 March 1987	(Norway) Voss	AE	(Sweden) Carin Hernskog	(United States) Maria Quintana	(United States) Melanie Palenik
63	8	8 March 1987	(West Germany) Oberjoch	AE	(West Germany) Sonja Reichart	(United States) Melanie Palenik	(Sweden) Susanna Antonsson
64	9	27 March 1987	(France) La Clusaz	AE	(West Germany) Sonja Reichart	(Japan) Hiroko Fujii	(Sweden) Susanna Antonsson

=== Ballet ===
Num	Season	Date	Place	Event	Winner	Second	Third
58	1	12 December 1986	(France) Tignes	AC	(France) Christine Rossi	(Switzerland) Conny Kissling	(United States) Ellen Breen
59	2	9 January 1987	(Canada) Mont Gabriel	AC	(United States) Jan Bucher	(France) Christine Rossi	(Switzerland) Conny Kissling
60	3	21 January 1987	(United States) Breckenridge	AC	(France) Christine Rossi	(United States) Jan Bucher	(Switzerland) Conny Kissling
61	4	22 January 1987	(United States) Breckenridge	AC	(United States) Jan Bucher	(Switzerland) Conny Kissling	(Canada) Lucie Barma
62	5	30 January 1987	(Canada) Calgary	AC	(United States) Jan Bucher	(France) Christine Rossi	(Switzerland) Conny Kissling
63	6	27 February 1987	(Norway) Voss	AC	(France) Christine Rossi	(Switzerland) Conny Kissling	(United States) Jan Bucher
64	7	6 March 1987	(West Germany) Oberjoch	AC	(United States) Jan Bucher	(France) Christine Rossi	(Switzerland) Conny Kissling
65	8	25 March 1987	(France) La Clusaz	AC	(France) Christine Rossi	(United States) Jan Bucher	(Switzerland) Conny Kissling

=== Combined ===
Num	Season	Date	Place	Event	Winner	Second	Third
52	1	12 December 1986	(France) Tignes	CO	(Switzerland) Conny Kissling	(Canada) Meredith Gardner	(Canada) Anna Fraser
53	2	11 January 1987	(Canada) Mont Gabriel	CO	(Switzerland) Conny Kissling	(United States) Melanie Palenik	(Canada) Meredith Gardner
54	3	22 January 1987	(United States) Breckenridge	CO	(Switzerland) Conny Kissling	(Canada) Anna Fraser	(United States) Melanie Palenik
55	4	24 January 1987	(United States) Breckenridge	CO	(Switzerland) Conny Kissling	(Canada) Anna Fraser	(United States) Melanie Palenik
56	5	1 February 1987	(Canada) Calgary	CO	(Switzerland) Conny Kissling	(Canada) Anna Fraser	(United States) Melanie Palenik
57	6	1 March 1987	(Norway) Voss	CO	(Switzerland) Conny Kissling	(United States) Melanie Palenik	(United Kingdom) Jilly Curry
58	7	8 March 1987	(West Germany) Oberjoch	CO	(Switzerland) Conny Kissling	(Canada) Anna Fraser	(United States) Melanie Palenik
59	8	27 March 1987	(France) La Clusaz	CO	(Switzerland) Conny Kissling	(United States) Melanie Palenik	(Canada) Anna Fraser

== Men's standings ==
=== Overall ===
Rank		Points
1	(France) Éric Laboureix	64
2	(United States) John Witt	53
3	(Canada) Chris Simboli	51
4	(Canada) Alain LaRoche	47
5	(United States) Chuck Martin	41

- Standings after 33 races.

=== Moguls ===
Rank		Points
1	(Finland) Martti Kellokumpu	166
2	(France) Éric Berthon	164
3	(United States) Cooper Schell	153
4	(United States) Steve Desovich	151
5	(Norway) Hans Engelsen Eide	147

- Standings after 9 races.

=== Aerials ===
Rank		Points
1	(Canada) Jean-Marc Rozon	149
2	(Canada) Lloyd Langlois	147
3	(France) Didier Méda	138
4	(United States) Kris Feddersen	133
5	(France) Jean-Marc Bacquin	128

- Standings after 9 races.

=== Ballet ===
Rank		Points
1	(West Germany) Hermann Reitberger	150
2	(United States) Lane Spina	146
3	(Canada) Dave Walker	135
4	(Canada) Richard Pierce	130
5	(Italy) Peter Mahlknecht	121

- Standings after 7 races.

=== Combined ===
Rank		Points
1	(France) Éric Laboureix	89
2	(United States) John Witt	86
3	(Canada) Alain LaRoche	79
4	(Canada) Chris Simboli	76
5	(United States) Chuck Martin	74

- Standings after 8 races.

== Ladies' standings ==
=== Overall ===
Rank		Points
1	(Switzerland) Conny Kissling	33
2	(Canada) Anna Fraser	20
3	(United States) Melanie Palenik	19
4	(France) Christine Rossi	12
5	(United States) Jan Bucher	12

- Standings after 34 races.

=== Moguls ===
Rank		Points
1	(France) Raphaëlle Monod	77
2	(Norway) Stine Lise Hattestad	72
3	(Switzerland) Conny Kissling	69
4	(West Germany) Tatjana Mittermayer	67
5	(Canada) LeeLee Morrison	66

- Standings after 9 races.

=== Aerials ===
Rank		Points
1	(West Germany) Sonja Reichart	67
2	(Sweden) Carin Hernskog	63
3	(France) Catherine Lombard	63
4	(Sweden) Susanna Antonsson	58
5	(United States) Maria Quintana	56

- Standings after 9 races.

=== Ballet ===
Rank		Points
1	(France) Christine Rossi	70
2	(United States) Jan Bucher	70
3	(Switzerland) Conny Kissling	63
4	(Canada) Lucie Barma	52
5	(United States) Ellen Breen	46

- Standings after 8 races.

=== Combined ===
Rank		Points
1	(Switzerland) Conny Kissling	48
2	(Canada) Anna Fraser	40
3	(United States) Melanie Palenik	39
4	(United Kingdom) Jilly Curry	31
5	(Canada) Meredith Gardner	13

- Standings after 8 races.
