= FIS Freestyle Ski World Cup =

Annual freestyle skiing competition

- Genre: freestyle skiing: moguls, aerials, ski cross; halfpipe, slopestyle, big air
- Locations: Europe, Japan, Canada, United States, Australia, Belarus, New Zealand, South Korea, China, Russia
- Inaugurated: 5 January 1980
- Organiser: International Ski Federation
- People: Joe Fitzgerald (coordinator); Kathrin Hostettler (assistant); JP Baralo (SX and SBX race director)
- 2025–26 FIS Freestyle Ski World Cup

The FIS Freestyle Ski World Cup is an annual freestyle skiing competition arranged by the International Ski Federation since 1980. Currently six disciplines are included in world cup: moguls, aerials, ski cross, halfpipe, slopestyle and big air. In the 1980s and 1990s there were also ski ballet and combined, which no longer exist.

Races are hosted primarily at ski resorts in North America, the Alps in Europe, with regular stops in Scandinavia, east Asia, but a few races have also been held in the Southern Hemisphere. World Cup competitions have been hosted in 22 countries around the world: Australia, Austria, Belarus, Canada, China, Croatia, Czech Republic, Finland, France, Germany, Italy, Japan, New Zealand, Norway, Russia, Slovenia, South Korea, Spain, Sweden, Switzerland, Ukraine and the United States. (note that all world cup races hosted at ski resort in Ukraine was still part of Soviet Union respectively.)

== Number of events ==
Mixed team events are not included in this list.

=== Men ===
Season	MO	AE	DM	SX	HP	SS	BA	AC	CO	Total
1980	5	5	–	–	–	–	–	5	5	20
1981	8	8	–	–	–	–	–	9	8	33
1982	11	9	–	–	–	–	–	11	9	40
1983	6	6	–	–	–	–	–	7	6	25
1984	9	9	–	–	–	–	–	8	8	34
1984–85	10	9	–	–	–	–	–	10	8	37
1985–86	6	8	–	–	–	–	–	7	6	27
1986–87	9	9	–	–	–	–	–	7	8	33
1987–88	10	10	–	–	–	–	–	10	10	40
1988–89	10	9	–	–	–	–	–	10	9	38
1989–90	9	9	–	–	–	–	–	9	9	36
1990–91	12	13	–	–	–	–	–	13	12	50
1991–92	11	11	–	–	–	–	–	11	11	44
1992–93	12	9	–	–	–	–	–	10	9	40
1993–94	11	11	–	–	–	–	–	11	9	42
1994–95	10	11	–	–	–	–	–	10	9	40
1995–96	11	12	3	–	–	–	–	10	6	42
1996–97	7	12	6	–	–	–	–	9	4	38
1997–98	8	10	5	–	–	–	–	6	–	29
1999	5	4	3	–	–	–	–	2	–	14
1999–00	7	7	4	–	–	–	–	2	–	20
2000–01	7	7	1	–	–	–	–	–	–	15
2001–02	9	6	3	–	–	–	–	–	–	18
2002–03	10	9	3	3	–	–	–	–	–	25
2003–04	12	12	2	8	3	–	–	–	–	37
2004–05	11	12	–	6	–	–	–	–	–	29
2005–06	11	11	–	5	2	–	–	–	–	29
2006–07	7	6	3	3	1	–	–	–	–	20
2007–08	9	9	1	8	3	–	–	–	–	30
2008–09	7	6	2	9	3	–	–	–	–	27
2009–10	10	6	–	11	–	–	–	–	–	27
2010–11	6	7	5	11	3	–	–	–	–	32
2011–12	7	10	6	10	2	2	–	–	–	37
2012–13	6	7	6	10	5	4	–	–	–	38
2013–14	8	5	3	11	4	5	–	–	–	36
2014–15	5	7	4	11	3	2	–	–	–	32
2015–16	4	6	4	12	4	4	1	–	–	35
2016–17	1	2		6	1		3	–	–	13
Total	317	319	64	124	34	17	4	177	146	1202

=== Women ===
Season	MO	AE	DM	SX	HP	SS	BA	AC	CO	Total
1980	5	5	–	–	–	–	–	5	5	20
1981	8	8	–	–	–	–	–	9	8	33
1982	11	9	–	–	–	–	–	11	9	40
1983	6	6	–	–	–	–	–	7	6	25
1984	9	9	–	–	–	–	–	8	8	34
1984–85	10	10	–	–	–	–	–	10	9	39
1985–86	6	8	–	–	–	–	–	7	6	27
1986–87	9	9	–	–	–	–	–	8	8	34
1987–88	10	10	–	–	–	–	–	10	10	40
1988–89	10	10	–	–	–	–	–	10	10	40
1989–90	9	9	–	–	–	–	–	9	9	36
1990–91	12	13	–	–	–	–	–	13	12	50
1991–92	11	12	–	–	–	–	–	11	11	45
1992–93	12	9	–	–	–	–	–	10	9	40
1993–94	11	11	–	–	–	–	–	11	10	43
1994–95	10	11	–	–	–	–	–	10	9	40
1995–96	11	11	3	–	–	–	–	10	–	35
1996–97	7	11	6	–	–	–	–	9	–	33
1997–98	8	10	5	–	–	–	–	6	–	29
1999	5	4	3	–	–	–	–	2	–	14
1999–00	7	7	4	–	–	–	–	2	–	20
2000–01	7	7	1	–	–	–	–	–	–	15
2001–02	9	7	3	–	–	–	–	–	–	19
2002–03	10	9	3	3	–	–	–	–	–	25
2003–04	12	12	2	8	3	–	–	–	–	37
2004–05	11	12	–	6	–	–	–	–	–	29
2005–06	11	11	–	5	2	–	–	–	–	29
2006–07	7	6	2	3	1	–	–	–	–	19
2007–08	9	9	1	8	3	–	–	–	–	30
2008–09	7	7	2	10	3	–	–	–	–	29
2009–10	11	6	–	11	–	–	–	–	–	28
2010–11	6	7	5	11	3	–	–	–	–	32
2011–12	7	10	6	10	2	2	–	–	–	37
2012–13	6	7	6	10	5	4	–	–	–	38
2013–14	8	5	3	11	4	5	–	–	–	36
2014–15	5	7	4	11	3	2	–	–	–	32
2015–16	4	6	4	12	4	4	1	–	–	35
2016–17	1	2		6	1		3	–	–	13
Total	318	322	63	125	34	17	4	178	139	1200

== Points distribution ==
Rank	1	2	3	4	5	6	7	8	9	10	11	12	13	14	15	16	17	18	19	20	21	22	23	24	25	26	27	28	29	30
Discipline	100	80	60	50	45	40	36	32	29	26	24	22	20	18	16	15	14	13	12	11	10	9	8	7	6	5	4	3	2	1
Overall	20	16	12	10	9	8	7.2	6.4	5.8	5.2	4.8	4.4	4	3.6	3.2	3	2.8	2.6	2.4	2.2	2	1.8	1.6	1.4	1.2	1	0.8	0.6	0.4	0.2

== Overall winners ==
NOTE: FIS did award a single Overall Freestyle Crystal Globe from 1980 until the late 2019–20 season, decided by dividing an athlete's total points by the number of events on that discipline's calendar. FIS retired this multi-disciplines Crystal Globe in the following seasons, keeping the separate circuit globes.

=== Men ===
Season	Winner	Runner-up	Third place
1980	(Canada) Greg Athans	(United States) Scott Brooksbank	(Canada) Rick Bowie
1981	(United States) Frank Beddor	(Canada) Greg Athans	(Canada) Peter Judge
1982	(United States) Frank Beddor (2)	(Canada) Peter Judge	(United States) Bruce Bolesky
1983	(Canada) Peter Judge	(Canada) Alain Laroche	(France) Eric Laboureix
1984	(Canada) Alain Laroche	(United States) Bruce Bolesky	(France) Éric Laboureix
1984–85	(Canada) Alain Laroche (2)	(France) Éric Laboureix	(Canada) Chris Simboli
1985–86	(France) Éric Laboureix	(Canada) Chris Simboli	(United States) John Witt
1986–87	(France) Éric Laboureix (2)	(United States) John Witt	(Canada) Chris Simboli
1987–88	(France) Éric Laboureix (3)	(Canada) Chris Simboli	(Canada) Alain LaRoche
1988–89	(Canada) Chris Simboli	(United States) Scott Ogren	(Canada) Alain LaRoche
1989–90	(France) Éric Laboureix (4)	(France) Olivier Allamand	(United States) Trace Worthington
1990–91	(France) Éric Laboureix (5)	(France) Youri Gilg	(United States) Trace Worthington
1991–92	(United States) Trace Worthington	(France) Youri Gilg	(Canada) David Belhumeur
1992–93	(United States) Trace Worthington (2)	(Norway) Rune Kristiansen	(Canada) Jean-Luc Brassard
1993–94	(Russia) Sergey Shupletsov	(Canada) David Belhumeur	(Canada) Trace Worthington
1994–95	(United States) Jonny Moseley	(United States) Trace Worthington	(Canada) David Belhumeur
1995–96	(United States) Jonny Moseley (2)	(Canada) David Belhumeur	(Switzerland) Heini Baumgartner
1996–97	(Canada) Darcy Downs	(France) Fabrice Becker	(Switzerland) Heini Baumgartner
1997–98	(France) Fabrice Becker	(United States) Jonny Moseley	(United States) Ian Edmondson
1999	(Canada) Nicolas Fontaine	(Belarus) Dmitri Dashinski	(Finland) Janne Lahtela
1999–00	(Finland) Janne Lahtela	(Canada) Nicolas Fontaine	(Belarus) Aleksei Grishin
2000–01	(Finland) Mikko Ronkainen	(United States) Eric Bergoust	(United States) Joe Pack
2001–02	(United States) Eric Bergoust	(United States) Jeremy Bloom	(Belarus) Aleksei Grishin
2002–03	(Russia) Dmitri Arkhipov	(Canada) Steve Omischl	(Canada) Jeff Bean
2003–04	(Canada) Steve Omischl	(France) Mathias Wecxsteen	(France) Laurent Favre
2004–05	(United States) Jeremy Bloom	(Czech Republic) Tomáš Kraus	(Austria) Isidor Grüner
2005–06	(Czech Republic) Tomáš Kraus	(Australia) Dale Begg-Smith	(Austria) Roman Hofer
2006–07	(Australia) Dale Begg-Smith	(Canada) Steve Omischl	(United States) Jeref Peterson
2007–08	(Canada) Steve Omischl (2)	(Czech Republic) Tomáš Kraus	(Australia) Dale Begg-Smith
2008–09	(Canada) Alexandre Bilodeau	(Canada) Steve Omischl	(Czech Republic) Tomáš Kraus
2009–10	(Belarus) Anton Kushnir	(Switzerland) Michael Schmid	(Australia) Dale Begg-Smith
2010–11	(France) Guilbaut Colas	(Austria) Andreas Matt	(Canada) Alexandre Bilodeau
2011–12	(Canada) Mikaël Kingsbury	(United States) Patrick Deneen	(Canada) Olivier Rochon
2012–13	(Canada) Mikaël Kingsbury (2)	(Canada) Alexandre Bilodeau	(Switzerland) Alex Fiva
2013–14	(Canada) Mikaël Kingsbury (3)	(Canada) Alexandre Bilodeau	(Sweden) Jesper Tjäder
2014–15	(Canada) Mikaël Kingsbury (4)	(United States) Mac Bohonnon	(France) Jean-Frédéric Chapuis
2015–16	(Canada) Mikaël Kingsbury (5)	(France) Kevin Rolland	(France) Jean-Frédéric Chapuis
2016–17	(Canada) Mikaël Kingsbury (6)	(Sweden) Henrik Harlaut	(China) Qi Guangpu
2017–18	(Canada) Mikaël Kingsbury (7)	(United States) Alex Ferreira	(Switzerland) Andri Ragettli
2018–19	(Canada) Mikaël Kingsbury (8)	(France) Bastien Midol	(China) Wang Xindi
2019–20	(Canada) Mikaël Kingsbury (9)	(Canada) Noah Bowman	(United States) Aaron Blunck

=== Women ===
Season	Winner	Runner-up	Third place
1980	(Canada) Stephanie Sloan	(Canada) Lauralee Bowie	(West Germany) Hedy Garhammer
1981	(Canada) Marie-Claude Asselin	(Canada) Renée Lee Smith	(Canada) Stéphanie Sloan
1982	(Canada) Marie-Claude Asselin (2)	(Switzerland) Conny Kissling	(United States) Hayley Wolff
1983	(Switzerland) Conny Kissling	(Canada) Marie-Claude Asselin	(Switzerland) Eveline Wirth
1984	(Switzerland) Conny Kissling (2)	(France) Catherine Frairer	(Canada) Meredith Gardner
1984–85	(Switzerland) Conny Kissling (3)	(Canada) Meredith Gardner	(Canada) Anna Fraser
1985–86	(Switzerland) Conny Kissling (4)	(Canada) Anna Fraser	(Canada) Meredith Gardner
1986–87	(Switzerland) Conny Kissling (5)	(Canada) Anna Fraser	(United States) Melanie Palenik
1987–88	(Switzerland) Conny Kissling (6)	(Canada) Meredith Gardner	(United States) Melanie Palenik
1988–89	(Switzerland) Conny Kissling (7)	(Canada) Meredith Gardner	(United States) Melanie Palenik
1989–90	(Switzerland) Conny Kissling (8)	(United States) Donna Weinbrecht	(West Germany) Sonja Reichart
1990–91	(Switzerland) Conny Kissling (9)	(United Kingdom) Jilly Curry	(Switzerland) Maja Schmid
1991–92	(Switzerland) Conny Kissling (10)	(Switzerland) Maja Schmid	(United Kingdom) Jilly Curry
1992–93	(Canada) Katherina Kubenk	(Switzerland) Maja Schmid	(United Kingdom) Jilly Curry
1993–94	(United States) Kristean Porter	(Russia) Natalia Orekhova	(Canada) Katherina Kubenk
1994–95	(United States) Kristean Porter (2)	(Switzerland) Maja Schmid	(Canada) Katherina Kubenk
1995–96	(Canada) Katherina Kubenk (2)	(United States) Donna Weinbrecht	(Russia) Elena Batalova
1996–97	(United States) Stacey Blumer	(Russia) Elena Batalova	(Canada) Katherina Kubenk
1997–98	(United States) Nikki Stone	(Russia) Elena Batalova	(Russia) Oksana Kushenko
1999	(Australia) Jacqui Cooper	(United States) Nikki Stone	(Canada) Veronica Brenner
1999–00	(Australia) Jacqui Cooper (2)	(United States) Veronica Brenner	(United States) Ann Battelle (Sweden) Marja Elfman
2000–01	(Australia) Jacqui Cooper (3)	(Norway) Kari Traa	(Belarus) Alla Tsuper
2001–02	(Norway) Kari Traa	(Belarus) Alla Tsuper	(United States) Hannah Hardaway
2002–03	(Norway) Kari Traa (2)	(Norway) Ingrid Berntsen	(Austria) Margarita Marbler
2003–04	(Norway) Kari Traa (3)	(France) Marie Martinod	(Switzerland) Virginie Faivre
2004–05	(China) Nina Li	(France) Ophélie David	(Austria) Karin Huttary
2005–06	(France) Ophélie David	(Austria) Karin Huttary	(Canada) Jennifer Heil
2006–07	(Canada) Jennifer Heil	(Australia) Jacqui Cooper	(China) Nina Li
2007–08	(France) Ophélie David (2)	(Australia) Jacqui Cooper	(Japan) Aiko Uemura
2008–09	(France) Ophélie David (3)	(United States) Hannah Kearney	(Canada) Jennifer Heil
2009–10	(China) Nina Li (2)	(France) Ophélie David	(Canada) Jennifer Heil
2010–11	(United States) Hannah Kearney	(Canada) Jennifer Heil	(China) Shuang Cheng
2011–12	(United States) Hannah Kearney (2)	(China) Mengtao Xu	(Canada) Marielle Thompson
2012–13	(China) Mengtao Xu	(Switzerland) Virginie Faivre	(Canada) Rosalind Groenewoud
2013–14	(United States) Hannah Kearney (3)	(China) Nina Li	(Canada) Justine Dufour-Lapointe
2014–15	(United States) Hannah Kearney (4)	(Sweden) Anna Holmlund	(United States) Kiley Mckinnon
2015–16	(United States) Devin Logan	(Sweden) Anna Holmlund	(Norway) Tiril Sjåstad Christiansen
2016–17	(Australia) Britteny Cox	(Sweden) Emma Dahlström	(Canada) Marielle Thompson
2017–18	(Sweden) Sandra Näslund	(China) Xu Mengtao	(Sweden) Jennie-Lee Burmansson
2018–19	(France) Perrine Laffont	(China) Xu Mengtao	(Switzerland) Fanny Smith
2019–20	(France) Perrine Laffont (2)	(Sweden) Sandra Näslund	(Switzerland) Fanny Smith

=== All-time Overall Crystal Globe winners ===
Suspended after 2019–20 season.

==== By skiers ====
Rank	Name	Wins	Second	Third	Total
1	(Switzerland) Conny Kissling	10	1	0	11
2	(Canada) Mikaël Kingsbury	9	0	0	9
3	(France) Éric Laboureix	5	1	2	8
4	(United States) Hannah Kearney	4	1	0	5
5	(Australia) Jacqui Cooper	3	2	0	5
5	(France) Ophélie David	3	2	0	5
7	(Norway) Kari Traa	3	1	0	4
8	(Canada) Steve Omischl	2	3	0	5
9	(United States) Trace Worthington	2	1	3	6
10	(Canada) Alain Laroche	2	1	2	5

==== By nations ====
Rank	Nation	Wins	Second	Third	Total
1	Canada	23	22	28	73
2	United States	17	16	14	47
3	France	10	11	5	26
4	Switzerland	10	6	3	23
5	Australia	5	3	2	10
6	China	3	3	3	9
7	Norway	3	3	1	7
8	Russia	2	3	2	7
9	Finland	2	0	1	3
10	Belarus	1	2	3	6

== Most overall World Cup titles ==
The following skiers have at least 3 overall Freestyle World Cup titles:

=== Men ===
9: (Canada) Mikael Kingsbury

5: (France) Éric Laboureix

=== Women ===
10: (Switzerland) Conny Kissling

4: (United States) Hannah Kearney

3: (France) Ophélie David, (Australia) Jacqui Cooper, (Norway) Kari Traa

== Most discipline World Cup titles ==
The records for most World Cup titles in each discipline are as follows:

Discipline	Men		Women	
Discipline	Name	Titles	Name	Titles
Moguls	(Canada) Mikael Kingsbury	13	(United States) Hannah Kearney	6
Ski Ballet (Acro)	(Germany) H. Reitberger	5	(United States) Jan Bucher	7
Combined	(France) Éric Laboureix (Canada) Alain Laroche	4	(Switzerland) Conny Kissling	9
Ski Cross	(Czech Republic) Tomáš Kraus	4	(France) Ophélie David	7
Aerials	(Canada) Nicolas Fontaine (Canada) Steve Omischl	4	(Australia) Jacqui Cooper	5
Dual moguls	(Sweden) Jesper Rönnback (France) Thony Héméry (Finland) Janne Lahtela	2	(France) Candice Gilg (Norway) Kari Traa	2
Halfpipe	(Finland) Kalle Leinonen (United States) David Wise (France) Kevin Rolland	2	(Canada) Sarah Burke (Switzerland) Virginie Faivre (Japan) Ayana Onozuka	2
Slopestyle	6 skiers	1	5 skiers	1

== See also ==
- Freestyle skiing
- Freestyle skiing at the Winter Olympics
- FIS Freestyle World Ski Championships
