= Freestyle skiing at the 1992 Winter Olympics – Women's moguls =

Women's moguls at the XVI Olympic Winter Games
- Venue: Tignes
- Dates: 12–13 February 1992
- Competitors: 24 from 11 nations
- Winning Score: 23.69

Medalists
1st place, gold medalist(s)		Donna Weinbrecht	United States
2nd place, silver medalist(s)		Yelizaveta Kozhevnikova	Unified Team
3rd place, bronze medalist(s)		Stine Lise Hattestad	Norway

The women's moguls event in freestyle skiing at the 1992 Winter Olympics in Albertville took place from 12 to 13 February at Tignes.

== Results ==
=== Qualification ===
The top 8 advanced to the final.

Rank	Name	Country	Score	Notes
1	Raphaëlle Monod	France	24.09	Q
2	Donna Weinbrecht	United States	23.48	Q
3	Stine Lise Hattestad	Norway	23.11	Q
4	Liz McIntyre	United States	22.60	Q
5	Yelizaveta Kozhevnikova	Unified Team	22.22	Q
6	Tatjana Mittermayer	Germany	21.90	Q
7	Silvia Marciandi	Italy	21.72	Q
8	Birgit Keppler-Stein	Germany	21.32	Q
9	Yvonne Seifert	Germany	20.17	
10	Yelena Korolyova	Unified Team	20.01	
11	Petra Moroder	Italy	18.69	
12	Olga Lychkina	Unified Team	18.04	
13	Conny Kissling	Switzerland	17.46	
14	Kari Traa	Norway	17.30	
15	Jilly Curry	Great Britain	16.86	
16	Bronwen Thomas	Canada	16.73	
17	LeeLee Morrison-Henry	Canada	16.46	
18	Anna Kindy	Canada	14.75	
19	Minna Karhu	Finland	14.75	
20	Helena Waller	Sweden	14.56	
21	Ann Battelle	United States	14.51	
22	Maggie Connor	United States	13.95	
23	Larisa Udodova	Unified Team	11.17	
24	Candice Gilg	France	8.74	

=== Final ===
Rank	Name	Country	Score	Notes
1st place, gold medalist(s)	Donna Weinbrecht	United States	23.69	
2nd place, silver medalist(s)	Yelizaveta Kozhevnikova	Unified Team	23.50	
3rd place, bronze medalist(s)	Stine Lise Hattestad	Norway	23.04	
4	Tatjana Mittermayer	Germany	22.33	
5	Birgit Keppler-Stein	Germany	21.44	
6	Liz McIntyre	United States	21.24	
7	Silvia Marciandi	Italy	19.66	
8	Raphaëlle Monod	France	15.57	
