= Freestyle skiing at the 1994 Winter Olympics – Women's moguls =

Women's moguls at the XVII Olympic Winter Games
- Venue: Kanthaugen Freestyle Arena
- Dates: 15–16 February 1994
- Competitors: 24 from 13 nations
- Winning Score: 25.97

Medalists
1st place, gold medalist(s)		Stine Lise Hattestad	Norway
2nd place, silver medalist(s)		Liz McIntyre	United States
3rd place, bronze medalist(s)		Yelizaveta Kozhevnikova	Russia

The Women's moguls event in freestyle skiing at the 1994 Winter Olympics in Lillehammer took place from 15–16 February at Kanthaugen Freestyle Arena.

== Results ==
=== Qualification ===
The top 16 advanced to the final.

Rank	Name	Country	Score	Notes
1	Liz McIntyre	United States	25.23	Q
2	Stine Lise Hattestad	Norway	24.91	Q
3	Yelizaveta Kozhevnikova	Russia	24.7	Q
4	Raphaëlle Monod	France	24.16	Q
5	Candice Gilg	France	24.12	Q
6	Donna Weinbrecht	United States	23.96	Q
7	Tatjana Mittermayer	Germany	23.81	Q
8	Ann Battelle	United States	23.63	Q
9	Bronwen Thomas	Canada	23.4	Q
10	Tae Satoya	Japan	23.32	Q
11	Minna Karhu	Finland	23.08	Q
12	Silvia Marciandi	Italy	22.99	Q
13	Marina Cherkasova	Russia	22.6	Q
14	Lyudmila Dymchenko	Russia	22.47	Q
15	Katherina Kubenk	Canada	22.24	Q
16	Yelena Korolyova	Russia	22.23	Q
17	Helena Waller	Sweden	22.05	
18	Sandrine Vaucher	Switzerland	21.99	
19	Genevieve Fortin	Canada	21.72	
20	Birgit Keppler-Stein	Germany	21.39	
21	Larisa Udodova	Uzbekistan	20.28	
22	Petra Moroder	Italy	19.83	
23	Julie Steggall	Canada	18.43	
24	Patricia Portillo	Spain	9.15	

=== Final ===
Rank	Name	Country	Score	Notes
1st place, gold medalist(s)	Stine Lise Hattestad	Norway	25.97	
2nd place, silver medalist(s)	Liz McIntyre	United States	25.89	
3rd place, bronze medalist(s)	Yelizaveta Kozhevnikova	Russia	25.81	
4	Raphaëlle Monod	France	25.17	
5	Candice Gilg	France	24.82	
6	Tatjana Mittermayer	Germany	24.43	
7	Donna Weinbrecht	United States	24.38	
8	Ann Battelle	United States	23.71	
9	Bronwen Thomas	Canada	23.57	
10	Silvia Marciandi	Italy	23.36	
11	Tae Satoya	Japan	23.18	
12	Lyudmila Dymchenko	Russia	23.12	
13	Minna Karhu	Finland	23.00	
14	Marina Cherkasova	Russia	22.32	
15	Yelena Korolyova	Russia	22.22	
16	Katherina Kubenk	Canada	21.08	
