= Freestyle skiing at the 1988 Winter Olympics =

Freestyle skiing at the XV Olympic Winter Games
- Pictogram for freestyle skiing
- Venue: Canada Olympic Park and Nakiska

Freestyle skiing was a demonstration sport at the 1988 Winter Olympics. The venues were Canada Olympic Park for aerials and ballet, and Nakiska for moguls. This was the first appearance of freestyle skiing at the Winter Olympics.

== Medal table ==
Rank	Nation	Gold	Silver	Bronze	Total
1	West Germany	2	1	0	3
2	France	1	2	1	4
3	United States	1	2	0	3
4	Canada	1	0	1	2
4	Sweden	1	0	1	2
6	Norway	0	1	1	2
7	Switzerland	0	0	2	2
Totals (7 entries)		6	6	6	18

== Men's event ==
=== Moguls ===
Place	Athlete	Score
1	Håkan Hansson (SWE)	39.56
2	Hans Engelsen Eide (NOR)	39.37
3	Edgar Grospiron (FRA)	37.71
4	Pat Henry (CAN)	35.59
5	Steve Desovich (USA)	35.15
6	Lasse Fahlén (SWE)	34.64

=== Aerials ===
Place	Athlete	Score
1	Jean-Marc Rozon (CAN)	410.93
2	Didier Méda (FRA)	380.77
3	Lloyd Langlois (CAN)	377.97
4	Kris Feddersen (USA)	376.24
5	Jean-Marc Bacquin (FRA)	348.75
6	Sonny Schönbächler (SUI)	340.94

=== Ballet ===
Place	Athlete	Score
1	Hermann Reitberger (FRG)	46.6
2	Lane Spina (USA)	45.6
3	Rune Kristiansen (NOR)	44.0
4	Richard Pierce (CAN)	43.0

== Women's event ==
=== Moguls ===
Place	Athlete	Score
1	Tatjana Mittermayer (FRG)	36.16
2	Raphaëlle Monod (FRA)	34.91
3	Conny Kissling (SUI)	34.07
4	Stine Lise Hattestad (NOR)	33.39
5	LeeLee Morrison (CAN)	31.84
6	Melanie Palenik (USA)	28.64

=== Aerials ===
Place	Athlete	Score
1	Melanie Palenik (USA)	268.83
2	Sonja Reichart (FRG)	267.03
3	Carin Hernskog (SWE)	245.98

=== Ballet ===
Place	Athlete	Score
1	Christine Rossi (FRA)	45.8
2	Jan Bucher (USA)	44.0
3	Conny Kissling (SUI)	43.2
4	Lucie Barma (CAN)	40.8
5	(Netherlands) Martien Nouwen (NED)	36.39
