= Catherine Lombard =

French freestyle skier

Personal information
- Full name: Catherine Françoise Lombard
- Nationality: French
- Born: 8 October 1965 Paris, France
- Died: 6 April 1994 (aged 28) Coulommiers, France

Sport
- Sport: Freestyle skiing
Medal record
Women's freestyle skiing
Representing France
World Championships
| Gold medal – first place | 1989 Oberjoch | Aerials |

Catherine Françoise Lombard (8 October 1965 — 6 April 1994) was a French freestyle skier.

She won a gold medal in aerials at the FIS Freestyle World Ski Championships 1989 in Oberjoch. She also competed at the 1986 (8th place) and 1991 (5th place) world championships.

She took part at the 1988 Winter Olympics in Calgary, where aerials was a demonstration event. She finished then last, 8th.

== World Cup results ==
=== Season standings ===
Season
| Season | Age | Overall | Aerials |
| 1985 | 19 | 47 | 19 |
| 1986 | 20 | 26 | 11 |
| 1987 | 21 | 9 | 3 |
| 1988 | 22 | 11 | 3 |
| 1989 | 23 | 6 | 1 |
| 1990 | 24 | 6 | 2 |
| 1991 | 25 | 38 | 14 |

=== Competition victories ===
Season
| Season | Date | Location | Discipline |
| 1987 | 17 January 1987 | Lake Placid, United States | Aerials |
| 1988 | 31 January 1988 | Inawashiro, Japan | Aerials |
| 1989 | 8 January 1989 | Mont Gabriel, Canada | Aerials |
| 1989 | 21 January 1989 | Calgary, Canada | Aerials |
| 1989 | 29 January 1989 | Breckenridge, United States | Aerials |
| 1989 | 24 March 1989 | Suomu, Finland | Aerials |
| 1990 | 27 January 1990 | Calgary, Canada | Aerials |
| 1991 | 7 December 1990 | Tignes, France | Aerials |

=== Podiums ===
Season
| Season | Victories | 2nd place | 3rd place | Total |
| 1985 | 0 | 0 | 0 | 0 |
| 1986 | 0 | 0 | 1 | 1 |
| 1987 | 1 | 2 | 2 | 5 |
| 1988 | 1 | 0 | 3 | 4 |
| 1989 | 4 | 1 | 1 | 6 |
| 1990 | 1 | 1 | 3 | 5 |
| 1991 | 1 | 0 | 0 | 1 |
| Total | 8 | 4 | 10 | 22 |
