= Monica Biondi =

Italian freestyle skier (born 1970)

Personal information
- Born: 1970 (age 55–56)

Sport
- Country: Italy

Monica Biondi (born 1970) is a retired Italian freestyle skier.

Between 1986 and 1989 she competed internationally in the "acro" event of freestyle skiing, i.e. ski ballet, with a 24th place at the 1989 World Championships and sixteen top-20 placements in the FIS Freestyle Ski World Cup.
