= FIS Freestyle World Ski Championships 1989 =

The 1989 FIS Freestyle World Ski Championships were held between March 1st and March 5th at the Oberjoch ski resort in West Germany. The World Championships featured both men's and women's events in the Moguls, Aerials, Acro Skiing and the Combined.

== Results ==
=== Men's results ===
==== Moguls ====
Medal	Name	Nation
1st place, gold medalist(s)	Edgar Grospiron	France
2nd place, silver medalist(s)	Jürg Biner	Switzerland
3rd place, bronze medalist(s)	Eric Berthon	France

==== Aerials ====
Medal	Name	Nation
1st place, gold medalist(s)	Lloyd Langlois	Canada
2nd place, silver medalist(s)	Didier Meda	France
3rd place, bronze medalist(s)	Philippe Laroche	Canada

==== Acro Skiing ====
Medal	Name	Nation
1st place, gold medalist(s)	Hermann Reitberger	Germany
2nd place, silver medalist(s)	Lane Spina	United States
3rd place, bronze medalist(s)	Dave Walker	Canada

==== Combined ====
Medal	Name	Nation	Result
1st place, gold medalist(s)	Chris Simboli	Canada	37.00
2nd place, silver medalist(s)	Scott Ogren	United States	48.00
3rd place, bronze medalist(s)	Marti Rafel	Spain	103.00

=== Women's results ===
==== Moguls ====
Medal	Name	Nation
1st place, gold medalist(s)	Raphaelle Monod	France
2nd place, silver medalist(s)	Donna Weinbrecht	United States
3rd place, bronze medalist(s)	Tatjana Mittermayer	Germany

==== Aerials ====
Medal	Name	Nation
1st place, gold medalist(s)	Catherine Lombard	France
2nd place, silver medalist(s)	Sonja Reichart	Germany
3rd place, bronze medalist(s)	Melanie Palenik	United States

==== Acro Skiing ====
Medal	Name	Nation
1st place, gold medalist(s)	Jan Bucher	United States
2nd place, silver medalist(s)	Conny Kissling	Switzerland
3rd place, bronze medalist(s)	Lucie Barma	Canada

==== Combined ====
Medal	Name	Nation
1st place, gold medalist(s)	Melanie Palenik	United States
2nd place, silver medalist(s)	Conny Kissling	Switzerland
3rd place, bronze medalist(s)	Meredith Anne Gardner	Canada
