= Sandrine Vaucher =

Swiss freestyle skier

Personal information
- Born: 20 August 1971 (age 53)

Sport
- Country: Switzerland
- Sport: Freestyle skiing

Sandrine Vaucher (born 20 August 1971) is a Swiss freestyle skier. She competed at the 1994 Winter Olympics in Lillehammer, in women's moguls.
