= Julie Steggall =

Canadian freestyle skier

Personal information
- Born: 26 October 1971 (age 54) Ottawa, Ontario

Sport
- Country: Canada
- Sport: Freestyle skiing

Julie Steggall (born 26 October 1971) is a Canadian freestyle skier. She was born in Ottawa, Ontario. She competed at the 1994 Winter Olympics, in women's moguls.
