= Hermann Reitberger =

German freestyle skier

Personal information
- Nationality: Germany
- Born: 21 September 1958 (age 67) Eggenfelden, West Germany

Sport
- Sport: Skiing

World Cup career
- Seasons: 12 – (1980–1991)
- Indiv. podiums: 73
- Indiv. wins: 44
- Overall titles: 0 – (5th in 1989)
- Discipline titles: 5 – (Ski ballet: 1985–1989)
Medal record
Freestyle skiing
Representing West Germany
World Championships
| Gold medal – first place | 1989 Oberjoch | Ski ballet |

Hermann Reitberger (born 21 September 1958) is a German former freestyle skier, specializing in ski ballet. He is the 1989 World Champion in this now-defunct discipline and won the demonstrational ski ballet event at the 1988 Winter Olympics. Reitberger achieved 44 World Cup victories in his career and won the ski ballet Crystal Globe five times, which makes him the most successful male World Cup skier in this discipline. He is also a four-time European Champion in ski ballet, winning the title in 1982, 1985, 1987 and 1990.

== Freestyle skiing results ==
=== World Championships ===
- 1 medal – (1 gold)

| Year | Age | Ski ballet |
|---|---|---|
| (France) 1986 Tignes | 27 | 6 |
| (West Germany) 1989 Oberjoch | 30 | 1 |
| (United States) 1991 Lake Placid | 32 | 6 |

=== World Cup standings ===
| Season | Age | Overall | Ski ballet |
|---|---|---|---|
| 1980 | 21 | 42 | 14 |
| 1981 | 22 | 26 | 8 |
| 1982 | 23 | 16 | 2 |
| 1983 | 24 | 17 | 2 |
| 1984 | 25 | 14 | 2 |
| 1984–85 | 26 | 10 | 1 |
| 1985–86 | 27 | 9 | 1 |
| 1986–87 | 28 | 7 | 1 |
| 1987–88 | 29 | 6 | 1 |
| 1988–89 | 30 | 5 | 1 |
| 1989–90 | 31 | 11 | 3 |
| 1990–91 | 32 | 31 | 10 |
