= Patricia Portillo =

Spanish freestyle skier

Personal information
- Nationality: Spanish
- Born: 8 August 1974 (age 50); Madrid, Spain

Sport
- Sport: Freestyle skiing

Patricia Portillo (born 8 August 1974) is a Spanish freestyle skier. She competed in the women's moguls event at the 1994 Winter Olympics.
