= Genevieve Fortin =

Canadian freestyle skier

Personal information
- Born: 20 April 1972 (age 53) Montreal, Quebec, Canada

Sport
- Country: Canada
- Sport: Freestyle skiing

Genevieve Fortin (born 20 April 1972) is a Canadian freestyle skier. She was born in Montreal. She competed at the 1994 Winter Olympics, in women's moguls.
