= Leif Persson =

Swedish freestyle skier (born 1968)

Personal information
- Nationality: Swedish
- Born: 12 July 1968 (age 56); Östersund, Sweden

Sport
- Sport: Freestyle skiing

Leif Persson (born 12 July 1968) is a Swedish freestyle skier. He competed at the 1992 Winter Olympics and the 1994 Winter Olympics.
