= Bronwen Thomas =

Canadian freestyle skier

Bronwen Thomas (born 17 March 1969) is a Canadian freestyle skier. She was born in Richmond, British Columbia. She competed at the 1992 Winter Olympics in Albertville, and at 1994 Winter Olympics in Lillehammer, where she placed 9th in women's moguls.
