= Martti Kellokumpu =

Finnish freestyle skier (born 1963)

Martti Markus Kellokumpu (born 29 November 1963 in Kemijärvi) is a Finnish former freestyle skier. Kellokumpu won bronze at the 1986 World Championship in Tignes, France. In 1987, he won the overall World Cup competition. Kellokumpu won 11 Finnish championships in freestyle skiing between 1982 and 1988.

Kellokumpu graduated with a master's degree in art from the Aalto University School of Arts, Design and Architecture in 1992. He worked as a designer for Creadesign from 1992 to 1996, and as a freelance designer from 1996 to 2000. He joined Halti the outdoor brand in 2000 and worked as a clothing designer until 2003, when he became chief designer.

In 2014 he became the Chief designer and part owner of the Icelandic clothing brand ZO•ON Iceland which he founded together with Jon Erlendsson in 1994.

Martti Kellokumpu's mother is Ritva Kellokumpu a well known ski clothing designer in Finland.
