= Tor Skeie =

Norwegian freestyle skier

Personal information
- Nationality: Norwegian
- Born: 8 August 1965 (age 59); Trondheim

Sport
- Sport: Freestyle skiing

Tor Skeie (born 8 August 1965) is a Norwegian freestyle skier. He was born in Trondheim, and represented the club Trond Freestyleklubb. He competed at the 1994 Winter Olympics in Lillehammer.

He was Norwegian champion in aerials in 1986, 1987, 1989, and 1995.
