= Yelena Korolyova =

Russian freestyle skier

Personal information
- Nationality: Russian
- Born: 27 October 1973 (age 52) Ufa, Russia

Sport
- Sport: Freestyle skiing

Yelena Korolyova (born 27 October 1973) is a Russian freestyle skier. She competed at the 1992 Winter Olympics, the 1994 Winter Olympics, and the 1998 Winter Olympics.
