= Lloyd Langlois =

Canadian freestyle skier

Medal record

Men's freestyle skiing

Representing Canada

Olympic Games
Bronze medal – third place	1994 Lillehammer	Aerials

FIS Freestyle World Ski Championships
Gold medal – first place	1986 Tignes	Aerials
Gold medal – first place	1989 Oberjoch	Aerials

Lloyd Langlois (born November 11, 1962) is a Canadian freestyle skier and Olympic medalist. He received a bronze medal at the 1994 Winter Olympics in Lillehammer, in aerials.

He finished third in the aerials (demonstration event) at the 1988 Winter Olympics in Calgary.

Langlois has been inducted into the Canadian Olympic Hall of Fame.
