= Helena Waller =

Swedish freestyle skier

Personal information
- Nationality: Swedish
- Born: 10 September 1966 (age 58); Uppsala, Sweden

Sport
- Sport: Freestyle skiing

Helena Waller (born 10 September 1966) is a Swedish freestyle skier. She competed at the 1992 Winter Olympics and the 1994 Winter Olympics.
