= Chuck Martin (skier) =

American freestyle skier

Personal information
- Born: August 20, 1967 (age 58) Rutland, Vermont, United States

Sport
- Sport: Freestyle skiing

Chuck Martin (born August 20, 1967) is an American freestyle skier. He competed in the men's moguls event at the 1992 Winter Olympics.
