= Ski ballet =

Ice sport performed on skis

Ski ballet is a form of ballet performed on skis. It is very similar to figure skating, combining spins, jumps, and flips in a two-minute routine choreographed to music. It was part of the professional freestyle skiing tours of the 1970s and 1980s and then an official FIS and Olympic discipline until the year 2000. Ski ballet became known as Acroski in the 1990s in an effort to legitimize its place among the competitive ski community, especially to the FIS. It is no longer a part of competitive freestyle skiing.

== Overview ==
Ski ballet involved a choreographed routine of flips, rolls, leg crossings, jumps, and spins performed on a smooth slope. After the mid-1970s, the routine was performed to music for 90 seconds. For a short period of time (in the 1980s), there were also pair ballet competitions, a variation of ballet where two people performed tricks that not only included spins, jumps, and leg crossing, but also lifts and synchronic movements. A panel of judges scored the performance similarly to figure skating.

== Notable athletes ==
=== Suzy Chaffee ===
Following her ski-racing career, Suzy Chaffee modelled in New York with Ford Models and then became the pre-eminent freestyle ballet skier of the early 1970s. She is perhaps best known by the nickname Suzy Chapstick, from the 1970s, when she was a spokesperson for ChapStick lip balm.

=== Genia Fuller ===
At the 1974 Freestyle Championship, Genia Fuller was the first person to win all four disciplines at one event (aerials, moguls, ballet, and combined). With a background in figure skating, she finished second in her first national junior freestyle contest at age 16. Unlike other competitors, she performed ski ballet without ski poles.

=== Lane Spina ===
Lane Spina won medals both times the discipline was held as an Olympic demonstration event; during the 1988 Winter Olympics in Calgary, Canada and the 1992 Winter Olympics in Albertville, France.

=== Rune Kristiansen ===
Rune Kristiansen won a gold medal in ballet at the FIS Freestyle World Ski Championships 1995, and had a total of 38 World Cup victories throughout his career. He competed at the 1992 Winter Olympics in ski ballet, which was a demonstration event. He was Norwegian champion in ballet in 1985, 1986, 1987, 1988, 1989, 1990, 1992 and 1993.

=== George Fuehrmeier ===
George Fuehrmeier competed in ski ballet during 1985. He gained popularity after a video of his routine was circulated on the Internet during the 2018 Winter Olympics.

=== Richard Schabl ===
Richard Schabl was the FIS World Champion of 1986. During his career as a freestyle skier, he invented the one handed pole flip and created many maneuvers that have revolutionized Freestyle Skiing.

== Olympic demonstration sport and decline in popularity ==
Ski ballet's increasing popularity led it being chosen as a demonstration sport for the 1988 and 1992 Winter Olympics. The popularity of the sport, however, significantly declined after 1992 due to the fact that it was not upgraded to Olympic sport status as well as due to the increasing popularity of snowboarding and other snow sports among young skiers. By 2000, the sport for all intents and purposes disappeared from international competition when the International Ski Federation ceased all formal competitions.

== See also ==
- FIS Freestyle World Ski Championships
- FIS Freestyle Skiing World Cup
- Aerial skiing
- Mogul skiing
- Ski cross
- Half-pipe
- Slopestyle
