= Larisa Udodova =

Uzbekistani freestyle skier (born 1973)

Personal information
- Nationality: Uzbekistani
- Born: 12 July 1973 (age 52)

Sport
- Sport: Freestyle skiing

Larisa Udodova (born 12 July 1973) is an Uzbekistani freestyle skier. She competed at the 1992 Winter Olympics and the 1994 Winter Olympics. She was the first woman to represent Uzbekistan at the Olympics.
