= Katherina Kubenk =

Canadian freestyle skier (born 1970)

Personal information
- Born: 11 October 1970 (age 55) Toronto, Canada
- Height: 175 cm (5 ft 9 in)
- Weight: 68 kg (150 lb)

Sport
- Country: Canada
- Sport: Freestyle skiing
Medal record
Women's freestyle skiing
Representing Canada
World Championships
Gold medal – first place	1993 Altenmarkt	Combined
Bronze medal – third place	1995 La Clusaz	Combined

Katherina Kubenk (born 11 October 1970) is a Canadian freestyle skier currently residing in St. Jacobs, Ontario. She was born in Toronto.

== Career ==
Kubenk competed at the World Freestyle Ski Championships, where she earned a gold medal in 1993 and a bronze medal in 1995. She also competed at the 1994 Winter Olympics in Lillehammer, in women's moguls and women's aerials.

Results
Event	Type	Qualified	Position	Result
1993 World Freestyle Ski Championships	?	?	1	?
1994 Lillehammer Winter Olympics	Aerials qualification	No	19	115,01
1994 Lillehammer Winter Olympics	Moguls qualification	Yes	15	22,24
1994 Lillehammer Winter Olympics	Moguls final		16	21,08
1995 World Freestyle Ski Championships	?	?	3	?
March 1998 Altenmarkt-Zauchensee World Cup	Acrobatics World Cup		6	?
