= Meredith Anne Gardner =

Canadian freestyle skier

Personal information
- Nationality: Canadian
- Born: June 29, 1961 (age 65)

Sport
- Country: Canada
- Sport: Freestyle skiing
- Event(s): Aerials, Moguls, ballet
- Retired: 1989
Medal record
Women's freestyle skiing
Representing Canada
FIS Freestyle World Ski Championships
Bronze medal – third place	1986 Tignes	Aerials
Bronze medal – third place	1989 Oberjoch	Combined

Meredith Anne Gardner (born June 29, 1961) is a Canadian retired freestyle skier who competed in ski ballet, mogul skiing, and aerial skiing. Gardner competed as a member of the Canadian Women's Freestyle Team from 1981 to 1988, winning the 1985 and 1988 World Championship in aerial skiing.

Gardner was inducted into the Canadian Ski Hall of Fame in 1995.
