= Freestyle skiing at the Winter Olympics =

- IOC Code: FRS
- Governing body: FIS
- Events: 15 (men: 7; women: 7; mixed: 1)

Winter Olympics
- 1924; 1928; 1932; 1936; 1948; 1952; 1956; 1960; 1964; 1968; 1972; 1976; 1980; 1984; 1988; 1992; 1994; 1998; 2002; 2006; 2010; 2014; 2018; 2022; 2026; Note: demonstration or exhibition sport years indicated in italics
- Medalists

Freestyle skiing has been contested at the Winter Olympic Games since the 1992 Winter Games in Albertville, France.

== Summary ==
Games	Year	Events	Best Nation
1 → 14			
15	1988	6	West Germany (1)
16	1992	2	France (1)
17	1994	4	Canada (1)
18	1998	4	United States (1)
19	2002	4	Finland (1)

Games	Year	Events	Best Nation
20	2006	4	China (1)
21	2010	6	Canada (2)
22	2014	10	Canada (3)
23	2018	10	Canada (4)
24	2022	13	China (2)
25	2026	15	United States (2)

== History ==
Freestyle skiing was a demonstration sport at the 1988 Winter Olympics, with moguls, aerials, and ballet events. Moguls became an official medal sport at the 1992 games, while aerials and ballet were still demonstration events. At the 1994 games, aerials also became an official medal event and the ski ballet competition was dropped. For the 2010 Winter Olympics, ski cross was added to the program while for the 2014 Winter Olympics half-pipe and slopestyle were added.

Alexandre Bilodeau became the first freestyle skiing gold medalist to defend his Olympic title, and first repeat gold medalist, winning the men's moguls at the 2014 Sochi Winter Olympics, having previously won the same event at the 2010 Vancouver Winter Olympics.

== Events ==
=== Men's ===
• = official event, (d) = demonstration event

Event	24	28	32	36	48	52	56	60	64	68	72	76	80	84	88	92	94	98	02	06	10	14	18	22	26	Years
Moguls															(d)	•	•	•	•	•	•	•	•	•	•	10
Aerials															(d)	(d)	•	•	•	•	•	•	•	•	•	9
Ski cross																					•	•	•	•	•	5
Half-pipe																						•	•	•	•	4
Slopestyle																						•	•	•	•	4
Big air																								•	•	2
Dual moguls																									•	1
Ballet															(d)	(d)										–
Total events															3	3	2	2	2	2	3	5	5	6	7	

=== Women's ===
• = official event, (d) = demonstration event

Event	24	28	32	36	48	52	56	60	64	68	72	76	80	84	88	92	94	98	02	06	10	14	18	22	26	Years
Moguls															(d)	•	•	•	•	•	•	•	•	•	•	10
Aerials															(d)	(d)	•	•	•	•	•	•	•	•	•	9
Ski cross																					•	•	•	•	•	5
Half-pipe																						•	•	•	•	4
Slopestyle																						•	•	•	•	4
Big air																								•	•	2
Dual moguls																									•	1
Ballet															(d)	(d)										–
Total events															3	3	2	2	2	2	3	5	5	6	7	

=== Mixed ===
Event	24	28	32	36	48	52	56	60	64	68	72	76	80	84	88	92	94	98	02	06	10	14	18	22	26	Years
Team Aerials																								•	•	2
Total events																								1	1	

== Medal table ==
Sources (after the 2022 Winter Olympics):
Accurate as of 2026 Winter Olympics and Court of Arbitration for Sport decision of December 13, 2022 to award two bronze medals in the women's ski cross event at the 2022 Winter Olympics.

Rank	Nation	Gold	Silver	Bronze	Total
1	United States	14	17	10	41
2	Canada	14	13	9	36
3	China	8	12	7	27
4	Switzerland	8	6	5	19
5	Australia	6	4	3	13
6	Norway	6	2	4	12
7	Belarus	4	2	2	8
8	France	3	6	7	16
9	Sweden	2	1	4	7
10	Finland	1	2	1	4
11	Japan	1	1	5	7
12	Germany	1	1	1	3
12	Italy	1	1	1	3
14	Ukraine	1	1	0	2
15	New Zealand	1	0	2	3
16	Czech Republic	1	0	0	1
16	Uzbekistan	1	0	0	1
18	Russia	0	1	3	4
19	Austria	0	1	1	2
19	Estonia	0	1	1	2
21	Unified Team	0	1	0	1
22	ROC (ROC)	0	0	3	3
23	Great Britain	0	0	2	2
23	Olympic Athletes from Russia	0	0	2	2
25	Kazakhstan	0	0	1	1
Totals (25 entries)		73	73	74	220

== Number of athletes by nation ==
Nation	24	28	32	36	48	52	56	60	64	68	72	76	80	84	88	92	94	98	02	06	10	14	18	22	26	Years
Argentina																1			1	1						3
Armenia																		1								1
Australia																2	5	5	7	9	11	21	16	13	14	10
Austria																	1	2	1	1	9	11	12	13	13	9
Belarus																	4	6	5	6	6	6	6	6		8
Belgium																						1				1
Brazil																						1		1		2
British Virgin Islands																						1				1
Canada																7	11	12	14	14	18	26	30	32	32	10
Chile																						2	2	1	1	4
China																	2	5	7	8	8	9	15	21	23	9
Czech Republic																		1	2	3	7	6	1	1	6	8
Denmark																		1	1		1		1			4
Estonia																								1	3	2
Finland																4	3	4	4	4	4	9	3	6	8	10
France																6	8	7	6	5	11	21	20	13	19	10
Germany																4	5	3		2	5	10	9	9	11	9
Great Britain																5	3	3	3		3	6	11	11	8	9
Hungary																							1			1
Individual Neutral Athletes																									3	1
Ireland																							1	1	1	3
Italy																6	6	2	1	6	1	4	4	6	10	10
Jamaica																					1					1
Japan																1	3	7	8	9	10	10	11	12	20	10
Kazakhstan																	1	2	1	3	5	8	9	9	9	9
Latvia																1										1
Mexico																							1			1
Netherlands																	1									1
New Zealand																		2			1	8	9	9	10	6
Norway																2	4	2	3	2	6	11	8	6	5	10
Olympic Athletes from Russia																							22			1
Paraguay																						1				1
Poland																					1	1	1			3
Portugal																		1								1
Puerto Rico																2										1
Romania																					1					1
Russia																	6	9	12	13	12	26				6
ROC																								22		1
Slovakia																						2			1	2
Slovenia																2		1	1	2	3	1	1			7
South Africa																									1	1
South Korea																				1	1	5	9	3	7	6
Spain																2	2			1	1	1		2		6
Sweden																4	8	8	4	4	8	11	14	14	10	10
Switzerland																5	6	4	6	4	14	24	22	19	20	10
Ukraine																	3	7	3	7	6	7	3	5	9	9
Unified Team																8										1
United States																8	12	14	14	14	18	26	29	32	32	10
Uzbekistan																	3	1								2
Nations	–	–	–	–	–	–	–	–	–	–	–	–	–	–	–	18	21	25	21	22	30	30	28	27	25	
Athletes	–	–	–	–	–	–	–	–	–	–	–	–	–	–	–	71	97	110	104	119	172	276	272	277	281	
Year	24	28	32	36	48	52	56	60	64	68	72	76	80	84	88	92	94	98	02	06	10	14	18	22	26	

== See also ==
- Freestyle skiing
- List of Olympic medalists in freestyle skiing
- List of Olympic venues in freestyle skiing
- FIS Freestyle World Ski Championships
- FIS Freestyle Skiing World Cup
- Aerial skiing
- Mogul skiing
- Ski ballet
- Ski cross
- Half-pipe
- Slopestyle
