= Robert Franco (skier) =

Mexican-American freestyle skier (born 1993)

Personal information
- Nicknames: Robby Franco; Roberto Franco
- Citizenship: Mexico; United States
- Born: August 23, 1993 (age 32) San Jose, California, U.S.

Sport
- Country: Mexico; United States
- Sport: Freestyle skiing
- Event: Slopestyle

Robert "Robby" Franco (born August 23, 1993) is a Mexican-American Olympian and freestyle skier. He competed for the United States of America in the 2015 FIS Freestyle World Ski Championships, and for Mexico in the 2017 championships. He represented Mexico in the 2018 Winter Olympics.

== Early life ==
Franco was born in San Jose, California to an American mother and a Mexican father from Guadalajara.

== Career ==
=== 2018 Winter Olympics ===
He was one of several skiers hoping to make the Mexican squad for the 2018 Olympics, alongside alpinists Rodolfo Dickson, Prince Hubertus of Hohenlohe-Langenburg, Sarah Schleper, Sandra Hillen in snowboard. He qualified for the 2018 Winter Olympics, alongside alpinists Rodolfo Dickson and Sarah Schleper, and cross-country skier Germán Madrazo.
