= Bernard Brandt =

Swiss freestyle skier

Personal information
- Nationality: Swiss
- Born: 14 November 1960 (age 64)

Sport
- Sport: Freestyle skiing

Bernard Brandt (born 14 November 1960) is a Swiss freestyle skier. He competed in the men's moguls event at the 1992 Winter Olympics.
