= Trace Worthington =

American freestyle skier

Personal information
- Full name: Tracy Jon Worthington
- Born: November 28, 1969 (age 55); Minneapolis, Minnesota, United States

Sport
- Sport: Freestyle skiing

Trace Worthington (born November 28, 1969) is an American former freestyle skier. He competed in two events at the 1994 Winter Olympics. After retiring from the sport, Worthington became a sports commentator, working for both NBC Sports and CBS Sports.

== Biography ==
Worthington was born in 1969 in Minneapolis, and began skiing at the age of two. His great-grandfather, Harry, competed in the men's long jump at the 1912 Summer Olympics in Stockholm. After moving to Winter Park, Colorado, Worthington took part in his first freestyle skiing competition when he was 14 years old. In 1986, he was the World Junior Champion in the aerials, winning the US title the next year.

From 1992 to 1995, Worthington was named the Freestyle Skier of the Year by Ski Racing magazine, and in 1993, he was also named the International Skier of the Year. Worthington won a total of 39 World Cup events, and finished on the podium 79 times during his career. At the 1995 FIS Freestyle World Ski Championships, he was the World Champion in both the aerials and combined events, the first time one person had held both titles.

Worthington took part in freestyle skiing as a demonstration event at the 1992 Winter Olympics. At the 1994 Winter Olympics in Lillehammer, Worthington competed in the men's moguls and the men's aerials, with a best placed finish of fifth in the aerials event. Just prior to the 1994 Winter Olympics, Worthington injured his right knee in training.

Worthington retired from the sport in 1997, due to vertigo, becoming a sports commentator. He also opened his own television production company. He was inducted into the U.S. Ski & Snowboard Hall of Fame in 2006.
