= Olivier Allamand =

French freestyle skier (born 1969)

Medal record

Representing France

Men's freestyle skiing

Olympic Games
| Silver medal – second place | 1992 Albertville | Moguls |

Olivier Allamand (born 31 July 1969) is a French freestyle skier and Olympic medalist. He won the silver medal at the 1992 Winter Olympics in Albertville. He also competed at the 1994 Winter Olympics.
