= Suomu =

Ski resort in Finland

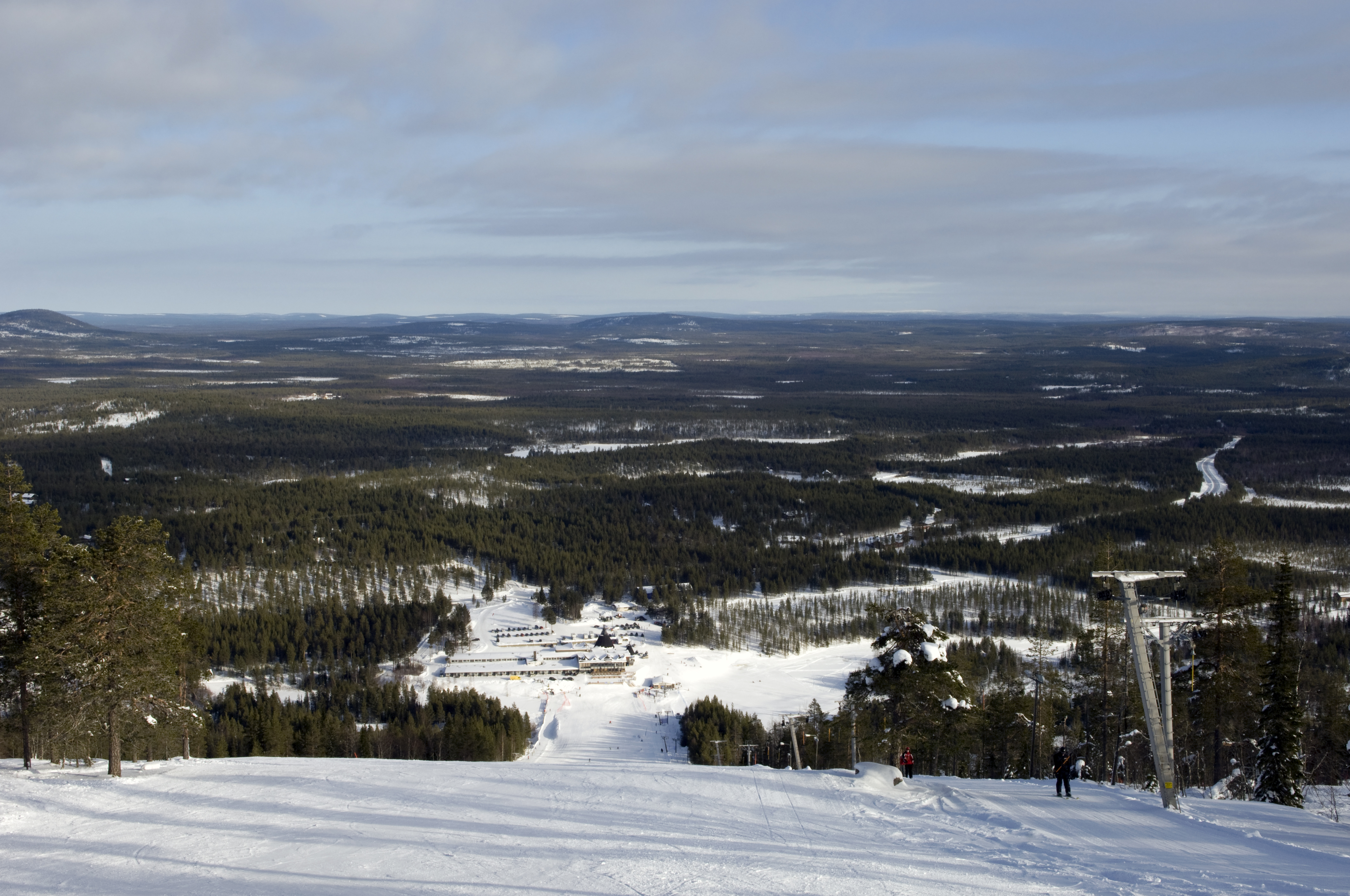
- View from the top of Suomu fell
- Interactive map of Suomu
- Location: Suomutunturi
- Nearest city: Kemijärvi
- Coordinates: 66°33′35.38″N 28°1′20.57″E
- Vertical: 255 metres (837 ft)
- Top elevation: 409 metres (1,342 ft)
- Base elevation: 165 metres (541 ft)
- Trails: 11
- Longest run: 1.7 kilometres (1.1 mi)
- Lift system: 4 lifts (snowmobile service available for off-piste access)
- Terrain parks: Yes
- Snowmaking: Yes
- Website: www.suomutunturi.fi

Suomu is an alpine ski resort in the Lapland province of Finland, near the municipality of Kemijärvi.

Suomu first opened in 1965. The resort is sometimes known as "the Arctic Circle Ski resort" because of its close proximity to the major northern circle of latitude.
