= Elizabeth McIntyre =

American freestyle skier

Personal information
- Full name: Elizabeth Geary McIntyre
- Born: April 5, 1965 (age 61) Hanover, New Hampshire, U.S.
Medal record
Women's freestyle skiing
Representing United States
Olympic Games
Silver medal – second place	1994 Lillehammer	Moguls

Elizabeth Geary McIntyre (born April 5, 1965), sometimes known as Liz McIntyre, is an American freestyle skier and Olympic medalist. She received a silver medal at the 1994 Winter Olympics in Lillehammer, in moguls. She finished 8th at the 1998 Winter Olympics in Nagano.

McIntyre was born in Hanover, New Hampshire.
