= Birgit Keppler-Stein =

German freestyle skier (born 1963)

Personal information
- Nationality: German
- Born: 26 August 1963 (age 62) Pfullingen, West Germany

Sport
- Country: Germany
- Sport: Freestyle skiing
Medal record
Women's freestyle skiing
Representing Germany
World Championships
Bronze medal – third place	1991 Lake Placid	Moguls

Birgit Keppler-Stein (born 26 August 1963) is a German freestyle skier. She was born in Pfullingen. She competed at the 1992 Winter Olympics in Albertville, where she placed fifth in women's moguls. She also competed at the 1994 Winter Olympics in Lillehammer.
