= Jürg Biner =

Swiss freestyle skier

Personal information
- Nationality: Swiss
- Born: 15 August 1964 (age 60); Zermatt, Switzerland

Sport
- Sport: Freestyle skiing

Jürg Biner (born 15 August 1964) is a Swiss freestyle skier. He competed at the 1992 Winter Olympics and the 1994 Winter Olympics.
