= Petra Moroder =

Italian freestyle skier

Personal information
- Nationality: Italian
- Born: 3 July 1968 (age 57) Bolzano, Italy

Sport
- Country: Italy
- Sport: Freestyle skiing
Medal record
Women's freestyle skiing
Representing Italy
World Championships
| Silver medal – second place | 1993 Altenmarkt | Moguls |

Petra Moroder (born 3 July 1968) is an Italian freestyle skier. She was born in Bolzano. She competed at the 1992, 1994 and 1998 Winter Olympics in women's moguls.
