= Kris Feddersen =

American freestyle skier

Personal information
- Born: October 30, 1963 (age 62) Cincinnati, Ohio, United States

Sport
- Sport: Freestyle skiing

Kris Feddersen (born October 30, 1963) is an American freestyle skier. He competed in the men's aerials event at the 1994 Winter Olympics.
