= Nelson Carmichael =

American mogul skier

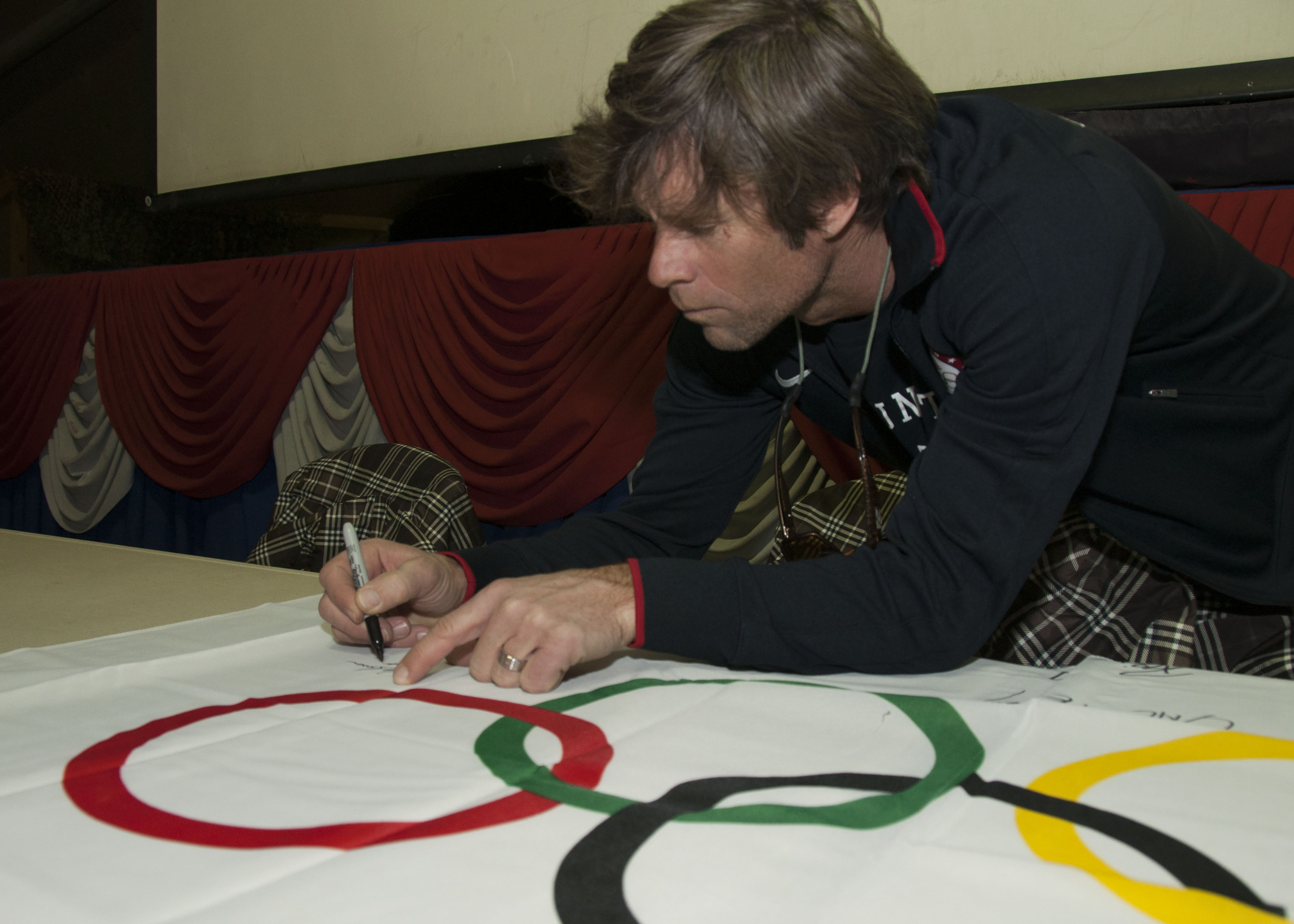
- Carmichael in 2013

Personal information
- Born: November 19, 1965 (age 60) Steamboat Springs, Colorado, U.S.
Medal record
Men's freestyle Skiing
Representing United States
Olympic Games
Bronze medal – third place	1992 Albertville	Moguls

Nelson Carmichael (born November 19, 1965, in Steamboat Springs, Colorado) is an American mogul skier. He won a bronze medal at the 1992 Winter Olympics.

He was with the U.S. team from 1983–1992. Carmichael was a two-time World Cup Grand Prix Mogul champion, won 12 individual World Cup event titles, was a six- time U.S. National Mogul champion and a Pro-Mogul champion.

Carmichael married fellow Olympic skier Caroline Lalive in 2012. They have one daughter (born 2015).
