= Donna Weinbrecht =

American freestyle skier

Personal information
- Born: April 23, 1965 (age 61) Hoboken, New Jersey, U.S.
Medal record
Women's freestyle skiing
Representing the United States
Olympic Games
Gold medal – first place	1992 Albertville	Moguls
World Championships
Gold medal – first place	1991 Lake Placid	Moguls
Silver medal – second place	1989 Oberjoch	Moguls
Silver medal – second place	1997 Iizuna Kogen	Moguls

Donna L. Weinbrecht (born April 23, 1965) is an American freestyle skier. She won the first gold medal awarded in the first Olympic mogul competitions in freestyle skiing, which were held at the 1992 Winter Olympics in Albertville, France. Weinbrecht grew up in West Milford, New Jersey. She was also World Champion in 1991 and a five-time World Cup moguls season champion (1990–92, 1994, and 1996).

She was born in Hoboken, New Jersey and raised in West Milford, New Jersey; she attended West Milford High School, where she formed the school's first ski team.

Weinbrecht's first sport was figure skating. While she was a competent skater, her family could not afford the cost of coaching. She learned to ski at Hidden Valley in Vernon Township, New Jersey and Vernon Valley / Great Gorge and spent most weekends skiing at Hidden Valley with her family. The family, now invested in skiing, bought a house in Killington, Vermont and Donna trained on the mogul trails of Killington Resort, especially the great mogul trail Outer Limits. Donna can still be seen at Killington regularly hosting mogul training camps and recreational skiing.
