= Éric Berthon =

French freestyle skier

Personal information
- Nationality: French
- Born: 10 October 1961 (age 65) Mulhouse, France

Sport
- Sport: Freestyle skiing

Éric Berthon (born 10 October 1961) is a French freestyle skier. He competed in the men's moguls event at the 1992 Winter Olympics.
