= Hans Engelsen Eide =

Norwegian freestyle skier (born 1965)

Personal information
- Born: 8 May 1965 (age 61) Voss Municipality

Sport
- Country: Norway
- Sport: Freestyle skiing
- Club: Voss Freestyleklubb

Hans Engelsen Eide (born 8 May 1965) is a Norwegian freestyle skier. He was born in Voss Municipality, and represented the club Voss Freestyleklubb. He competed at the 1994 Winter Olympics in Lillehammer, where he placed 15th in moguls.

He was Norwegian champion in moguls in 1984, 1985, 1987, 1988, 1989, 1990, 1991 and 1994.
