= Lane Spina =

American freestyle skier

Personal information
- Born: 3 January 1962 (age 64) Reno, Nevada, U.S.

Sport
- Country: United States
- Sport: Men's freestyle skiing
Medal record
FIS Freestyle World Ski Championships
Gold medal – first place	1991 Lake Placid	Acro Skiing
Silver medal – second place	1986 Tignes	Acro Skiing
Silver medal – second place	1989 Oberjoch	Acro Skiing
Bronze medal – third place	1993 Altenmarkt	Acro Skiing

Lane Spina (born 3 January 1962) is an American freestyle skier who won two medals in demonstration events of the Olympic Games; at the 1988 Winter Olympics in Calgary, Canada and the 1992 Winter Olympics in Albertville, France. He also won the Freestyle World Championships in 1991 in Lake Placid, New York. Spina was born and raised in Reno, Nevada, and graduated from Wooster High School. Following his ski career, he went on to achieve academic degrees in both Mechanical Engineering and Masters of Business Administration (MBA), from the University of Nevada, Las Vegas.

== Skiing competitions ==
=== Freestyle Skiing World Cup ===
Year	Competition	Place
1984	Acrobatics	3rd
1986	Acrobatics	2nd
1987	Acrobatics	2nd
1988	Acrobatics	2nd
1989	Acrobatics	2nd
1991	Acrobatics	2nd
1992	Acrobatics	3rd

=== Olympics ===
Spina medaled both time ski ballet was held as an Olympic demonstration event; both at the 1988 and the 1992 Winter Olympics that were held in Calgary, Canada and Albertville, France, respectively. He won a silver medal in 1988 and a bronze medal in 1992.
