= LeeLee Morrison-Henry =

Canadian freestyle skier

Personal information
- Born: 2 October 1960 (age 64); Norwood, Massachusetts, United States

Sport
- Country: Canada
- Sport: Freestyle skiing

LeeLee Morrison-Henry (born 2 October 1960) is a Canadian freestyle skier. She was born in Norwood, Massachusetts, United States. She competed at the 1992 Winter Olympics, in women's moguls.
