= Sonja Reichart =

German freestyle skier

Sonja Reichart (born 2 November 1964) is a German freestyle skier.

Reichart was born in Immenstadt, Germany. She participated in the Freestyle skiing at the 1988 Winter Olympics in Calgary, where freestyle skiing was a demonstration sport. In aerials she placed second with a score of 267.03. She received a silver medal for aerials at FIS Freestyle World Ski Championships 1989.

In 1990 she won the women' aerials in the Subaru World Cup Freestyle competition in Lake Placid. At the 1994 Winter Olympics in Lillehammer, she was number 22 in aerials.
