= Melanie Palenik =

American freestyle skier

Personal information
- Nationality: American
- Born: 1966 (age 59–60) Windsor, Ontario, Canada

Sport
- Country: United States
- Sport: Freestyle skiing
Medal record
Women's freestyle skiing
Representing United States
World Championships
Gold medal – first place	1989 Oberjoch	Combined
Silver medal – second place	1989 Oberjoch	Aerials

Melanie Palenik (born 1966) is a Canadian-born American freestyle skier and world champion.

She competed at the FIS Freestyle World Ski Championships 1986 in Tignes, in aerials and moguls. She won a gold medal in combined at the FIS Freestyle World Ski Championships 1989 in Oberjoch, and a bronze medal in aerials, while placing tenth in moguls and tenth in ballet. In 1988 she won a gold medal in aerials at the Olympics in Calgary Canada. She also took part in the FIS Freestyle World Ski Championships 1991 in Lake Placid, New York, where she placed 8th in moguls.
