= Jean-Marc Bacquin =

French freestyle skier

Personal information
- Nationality: French
- Born: 20 February 1964 (age 61); Bois-Colombes, France

Sport
- Sport: Freestyle skiing

Jean-Marc Bacquin (born 20 February 1964) is a French freestyle skier. He competed in the men's aerials event at the 1994 Winter Olympics.
