= Tatjana Mittermayer =

German freestyle skier (born 1964)

Medal record

Women's freestyle skiing

Representing Germany

Olympic Games
Silver medal – second place	1998 Nagano	Moguls

FIS Freestyle World Ski Championships
Silver medal – second place	1991 Lake Placid	Moguls
Bronze medal – third place	1989 Oberjoch	Moguls
Bronze medal – third place	1995 La Clusaz	Moguls
Bronze medal – third place	1997 Iizuna Kogen	Moguls

Tatjana Mittermayer (born 26 July 1964 in Rosenheim, Bavaria) is a German freestyle skier and Olympic medalist. She won the silver medal at the 1998 Winter Olympics in Nagano, in moguls.

She participated at the 1988 Winter Olympics moguls (demonstration event), where she finished 1st. She participated at the 1992 Winter Olympics, finishing 4th, and at the 1994 Winter Olympics, finishing 6th.
