= Rune Kristiansen =

Norwegian freestyle skier

Rune Kristiansen (born 30 July 1964) is a Norwegian freestyle skier. He represented the club Christiania Freestyleklubb. He won a gold medal in ballet at the FIS Freestyle World Ski Championships 1995, and had a total of 54 world cup victories throughout his career. He competed at the 1992 Winter Olympics in Ski Ballet, which was a demonstration event. He was Norwegian champion in ballet in 1985, 1986, 1987, 1988, 1989, 1990, 1992 and 1993.
