= Raphaëlle Monod =

French freestyle skier

Personal information
- Nationality: French
- Born: 18 January 1969 (age 57) Annecy, France

Sport
- Country: France
- Sport: Freestyle skiing
Medal record
Women's freestyle skiing
Representing France
World Championships
Gold medal – first place	1989 Oberjoch	Moguls
Silver medal – second place	1995 La Clusaz	Moguls

Raphaëlle Monod (born 18 January 1969) is a French freestyle skier. She was born in Annecy. She competed in the 1992 Winter Olympics in Albertville, and at the 1994 Winter Olympics in Lillehammer, where she placed fourth in women's moguls.
