= Conny Kissling =

Swiss freestyle skier (born 1961)

Personal information
- Born: 18 July 1961 (age 64)

Sport
- Country: Switzerland
- Sport: Freestyle skiing
Medal record
Women's freestyle skiing
Representing Switzerland
World Championships
Gold medal – first place	1986 Tignes	Combined
Silver medal – second place	1989 Oberjoch	Combined
Silver medal – second place	1989 Oberjoch	Acroski
Silver medal – second place	1991 Lake Placid	Combined

Conny Kissling (born 18 July 1961) is a Swiss freestyle skier, world champion and Olympic participant.

She competed at the 1992 Winter Olympics in Albertville, in women's moguls. Her achievements at the FIS Freestyle World Ski Championships include one gold medal in combined in 1986, and three silver medals.

Kissling is married to Swiss alpine skier and sports official Urs Lehmann.
