= 1984 FIS Freestyle Ski World Cup =

Freestyle skiing competitive season

Freestyle Skiing World Cup 1984
Discipline	Men	Women
Overall	(Canada) Alain Laroche	(Switzerland) Conny Kissling
Moguls	(France) Philippe Bron	(United States) Hilary English (4)
Aerials	(Canada) Yves Laroche	(Switzerland) Eveline Wirth
Ballet	(West Germany) Richard Schabl (2)	(United States) Jan Bucher
Combined	(Canada) Alain Laroche	(Switzerland) Conny Kissling

Competition
Locations	9	9
Individual	34	34

The 1984 FIS Freestyle Skiing World Cup was the fifth World Cup season in freestyle skiing organised by International Ski Federation. The season started on 13 January 1984 and ended on 29 March 1984. This season included four disciplines: aerials, moguls, ballet and combined.

== Men ==
=== Moguls ===
Num	Season	Date	Place	Event	Winner	Second	Third
31	1	13 January 1984	(Canada) Stoneham	MO	(France) Philippe Bron	(Canada) Bill Keenan	(Sweden) Lasse Fahlén
32	2	20 January 1984	(United States) Breckenridge	MO	(United States) John Witt	(France) Jean Dutruilh	(France) Philippe Bron
33	3	5 February 1984	(France) Courchevel	MO	(France) Jean Dutruilh	(France) Philippe Deiber	(Sweden) Gunnar Moberg
34	4	27 February 1984	(Austria) Göstling	MO	(Canada) Bill Keenan	(Sweden) Hans Fahlén	(France) Philippe Bron
35	5	2 March 1984	(West Germany) Oberjoch	MO	(France) Philippe Deiber	(Italy) Mauro Mottini	(United States) Cooper Schell
36	6	8 March 1984	(Italy) Campitello Matese	MO	(Italy) Mauro Mottini	(France) Jean Dutruilh	(France) Philippe Bron
37	7	11 March 1984	(Italy) Campitello Matese	MO	(Sweden) Lasse Fahlén	(United States) Cooper Schell	(France) Philippe Deiber
38	8	21 March 1984	(Sweden) Sälen	MO	(Canada) Bill Keenan	(France) Philippe Bron	(Sweden) Lasse Fahlén
39	9	28 March 1984	(France) Tignes	MO	(France) Jean Dutruilh	(France) Philippe Bron	(United States) Steve Desovich

=== Aerials ===
Num	Season	Date	Place	Event	Winner	Second	Third
29	1	15 January 1984	(Canada) Stoneham	AE	(Canada) Yves LaRoche	(Switzerland) Sandro Wirth	(Canada) Alain LaRoche
30	2	21 January 1984	(United States) Breckenridge	AE	(Canada) Yves LaRoche	(Canada) Alain LaRoche	(Switzerland) Sandro Wirth
31	3	4 February 1984	(France) Courchevel	AE	(Canada) Pierre Poulin	(Switzerland) Sandro Wirth	(Canada) Alain LaRoche
32	4	27 February 1984	(Austria) Göstling	AE	(Canada) Pierre Poulin	(Canada) Lloyd Langlois	(Canada) Alain LaRoche
33	5	29 February 1984	(Italy) Ravascletto	AE	(Canada) Craig Clow	(Canada) Roch Otis	(France) Jean-Marc Bacquin
34	6	4 March 1984	(West Germany) Oberjoch	AE	(Canada) Pierre Poulin	(Canada) Yves LaRoche	(Canada) Alain LaRoche
35	7	12 March 1984	(Italy) Campitello Matese	AE	(Canada) Yves LaRoche	(Canada) Lloyd Langlois	(Canada) Chris Simboli
36	8	22 March 1984	(Sweden) Sälen	AE	(Canada) Pierre Poulin	(Canada) Yves LaRoche	(Canada) Lloyd Langlois
37	9	29 March 1984	(France) Tignes	AE	(Canada) Yves LaRoche	(Canada) Lloyd Langlois	(Canada) Chris Simboli

=== Ballet ===
Num	Season	Date	Place	Event	Winner	Second	Third
33	1	14 January 1984	(Canada) Stoneham	AC	(West Germany) Hermann Reitberger	(West Germany) Richard Schabl	(Canada) Daniel Cote
34	2	20 January 1984	(United States) Breckenridge	AC	(West Germany) Richard Schabl	(United States) Lane Spina	(West Germany) Hermann Reitberger
35	3	3 February 1984	(France) Courchevel	AC	(West Germany) Hermann Reitberger	(West Germany) Richard Schabl	(United States) Lane Spina
36	4	25 February 1984	(Austria) Göstling	AC	(West Germany) Hermann Reitberger	(West Germany) Richard Schabl	(West Germany) Ernst Garhammer
37	5	28 February 1984	(Italy) Ravascletto	AC	(West Germany) Hermann Reitberger	(West Germany) Richard Schabl	(Canada) Alain Laroche
38	6	3 March 1984	(West Germany) Oberjoch	AC	(West Germany) Richard Schabl	(United States) Lane Spina	(West Germany) Hermann Reitberger
39	7	20 March 1984	(Sweden) Sälen	AC	(West Germany) Richard Schabl	(West Germany) Hermann Reitberger	(United States) Lane Spina
40	8	27 March 1984	(France) Tignes	AC	(West Germany) Richard Schabl	(West Germany) Hermann Reitberger	(United States) Lane Spina

=== Combined ===
Num	Season	Date	Place	Event	Winner	Second	Third
29	1	15 January 1984	(Canada) Stoneham	CO	(United States) Bruce Bolesky	(Canada) Peter Judge	(France) Éric Laboureix
30	2	21 January 1984	(United States) Breckenridge	CO	(United States) Bruce Bolesky	(Canada) Alain LaRoche	(Canada) Murray Cluff
31	3	5 February 1984	(France) Courchevel	CO	(Canada) Alain LaRoche	(France) Éric Laboureix	(Canada) Murray Cluff
32	4	27 February 1984	(Austria) Göstling	CO	(Canada) Alain LaRoche	(Canada) Peter Judge	(France) Éric Laboureix
33	5	4 March 1984	(West Germany) Oberjoch	CO	(Canada) Alain LaRoche	(Canada) Peter Judge	(United States) Bruce Bolesky
34	6	8 March 1984	(Italy) Campitello Matese	CO	(France) Éric Laboureix	(United States) Bruce Bolesky	(Canada) Murray Cluff
35	7	22 March 1984	(Sweden) Sälen	CO	(United States) Bruce Bolesky	(Canada) Alain LaRoche	(France) Éric Laboureix
36	8	29 March 1984	(France) Tignes	CO	(Canada) Alain LaRoche	(Canada) Chris Simboli	(Canada) Peter Judge

== Ladies ==
=== Moguls ===
Num	Season	Date	Place	Event	Winner	Second	Third
31	1	13 January 1984	(Canada) Stoneham	MO	(United States) Hilary English	(United States) Mary-Jo Tiampo	(Switzerland) Erika Gallizzi
32	2	20 January 1984	(United States) Breckenridge	MO	(United States) Hayley Wolff	(United States) Mary-Jo Tiampo	(United States) Hilary English
33	3	5 February 1984	(France) Courchevel	MO	(France) Catherine Frarier	(Switzerland) Erika Gallizzi	(United States) Anne Gilbert
34	4	27 February 1984	(Austria) Göstling	MO	(United States) Mary-Jo Tiampo	(United States) Hayley Wolff	(France) Catherine Frarier
35	5	2 March 1984	(West Germany) Oberjoch	MO	(Sweden) Madeleine Uvhagen	(Switzerland) Erika Gallizzi	(United States) Hayley Wolff
36	6	8 March 1984	(Italy) Campitello Matese	MO	(United States) Hilary English	(Italy) Laura Colnaghi	(Switzerland) Erika Gallizzi
37	7	11 March 1984	(Italy) Campitello Matese	MO	(Sweden) Lasse Fahlén	(United States) Hayley Wolff	(Sweden) Madeleine Uvhagen
38	8	21 March 1984	(Sweden) Sälen	MO	(United States) Hilary English	(United States) Hayley Wolff	(Switzerland) Erika Gallizzi
39	9	28 March 1984	(France) Tignes	MO	(United States) Hilary English	(Switzerland) Erika Gallizzi	(United States) Mary-Jo Tiampo

=== Aerials ===
Num	Season	Date	Place	Event	Winner	Second	Third
29	1	15 January 1984	(Canada) Stoneham	AE	(Switzerland) Conny Kissling	(France) Catherine Frarier	(United States) Maria Quintana
30	2	21 January 1984	(United States) Breckenridge	AE	(France) Catherine Frarier	(United States) Maria Quintana	(Canada) Anna Fraser
31	3	4 February 1984	(France) Courchevel	AE	(United States) Maria Quintana	(Switzerland) Eveline Wirth	(Sweden) Annika Wignäs
32	4	27 February 1984	(Austria) Göstling	AE	(Switzerland) Eveline Wirth	(Canada) Meredith Gardner	(Austria) Andrea Amann
33	5	29 February 1984	(Italy) Ravascletto	AE	(Switzerland) Eveline Wirth	(Switzerland) Conny Kissling	(Austria) Andrea Amann
34	6	4 March 1984	(West Germany) Oberjoch	AE	(Switzerland) Eveline Wirth	(Austria) Andrea Amann	(Sweden) Annika Wignäs
35	7	12 March 1984	(Italy) Campitello Matese	AE	(Sweden) Annika Wignäs	(Switzerland) Conny Kissling	(Australia) Lyn Grosse
36	8	22 March 1984	(Sweden) Sälen	AE	(Switzerland) Eveline Wirth	(Austria) Andrea Amann	(Switzerland) Conny Kissling
37	9	29 March 1984	(France) Tignes	AE	(Canada) Yves LaRoche	(Australia) Lyn Grosse	(Canada) Meredith Gardner

=== Ballet ===
Num	Season	Date	Place	Event	Winner	Second	Third
33	1	14 January 1984	(Canada) Stoneham	AC	(France) Christine Rossi	(United States) Jan Bucher	(Switzerland) Conny Kissling
34	2	20 January 1984	(United States) Breckenridge	AC	(United States) Jan Bucher	(Switzerland) Conny Kissling	(France) Christine Rossi
35	3	3 February 1984	(France) Courchevel	AC	(United States) Jan Bucher	(France) Christine Rossi	(Switzerland) Conny Kissling
36	4	25 February 1984	(Austria) Göstling	AC	(France) Christine Rossi	(Switzerland) Conny Kissling	(United States) Jan Bucher
37	5	25 February 1984	(Italy) Ravascletto	AC	(United States) Jan Bucher	(Switzerland) Conny Kissling	(France) Christine Rossi
38	6	3 March 1984	(West Germany) Oberjoch	AC	(United States) Jan Bucher	(France) Christine Rossi	(Switzerland) Conny Kissling
39	7	20 March 1984	(Sweden) Sälen	AC	(United States) Jan Bucher	(France) Christine Rossi	(Switzerland) Conny Kissling
40	8	27 March 1984	(France) Tignes	AC	(United States) Jan Bucher	(France) Christine Rossi	(Switzerland) Conny Kissling

=== Combined ===
Num	Season	Date	Place	Event	Winner	Second	Third
29	1	15 January 1984	(Canada) Stoneham	CO	(Switzerland) Conny Kissling	(France) Catherine Frarier	(Canada) Meredith Gardner
30	2	21 January 1984	(United States) Breckenridge	CO	(Switzerland) Conny Kissling	(France) Catherine Frarier	(United States) Diana Williams
31	3	5 February 1984	(France) Courchevel	CO	(France) Catherine Frarier	(Switzerland) Conny Kissling	(United States) Anne Gilbert
32	4	27 February 1984	(Austria) Göstling	CO	(France) Catherine Frarier	(Switzerland) Conny Kissling	(Canada) Meredith Gardner
33	5	4 March 1984	(West Germany) Oberjoch	CO	(Switzerland) Conny Kissling	(France) Catherine Frarier	(Switzerland) Eveline Wirth
34	6	9 March 1984	(Italy) Campitello Matese	CO	(Switzerland) Conny Kissling	(France) Catherine Frarier	(Italy) Silvia Marciandi
35	7	22 March 1984	(Sweden) Sälen	CO	(Switzerland) Conny Kissling	(France) Catherine Frarier	(Canada) Meredith Gardner
36	8	29 March 1984	(France) Tignes	CO	(Switzerland) Conny Kissling	(France) Catherine Frarier	(Switzerland) Eveline Wirth

== Men's standings ==
=== Overall ===
Rank		Points
1	(Canada) Alain Laroche	74
2	(United States) Bruce Bolesky	66
3	(France) Eric Laboureix	60
4	(Canada) Peter Judge	58
5	(Canada) Murray Cluff	53

- Standings after 34 races.

=== Moguls ===
Rank		Points
1	(France) Philippe Bron	142
2	(France) Jean Dutruilh	139
3	(Sweden) Lasse Fahlen	137
4	(Canada) Bill Keenan	134
5	(Italy) Mauro Mottini	134

- Standings after 9 races.

=== Aerials ===
Rank		Points
1	(Canada) Yves Laroche	148
2	(Canada) Pierre Poulin	144
3	(Canada) Lloyd Langlois	139
4	(Canada) Alain LaRoche	137
5	(Canada) Chris Simboli	119

- Standings after 9 races.

=== Ballet ===
Rank		Points
1	(West Germany) Richard Schabl	148
2	(West Germany) Hermann Reitberger	148
3	(United States) Lane Spina	139
4	(Canada) Alain LaRoche	130
5	(United States) Bruce Bolesky	123

- Standings after 8 races.

=== Combined ===
Rank		Points
1	(Canada) Alain Laroche	88
2	(United States) Bruce Bolesky	84
3	(France) Eric Laboureix	80
4	(Canada) Peter Judge	76
5	(Canada) Murray Cluff	73

- Standings after 8 races.

== Ladies' standings ==
=== Overall ===
Rank		Points
1	(Switzerland) Conny Kissling	36
2	(France) Catherine Frairer	30
3	(Canada) Meredith Gardner	18
4	(Switzerland) Eveline Wirth	16
5	(Canada) Anna Fraser	16

- Standings after 34 races.

=== Moguls ===
Rank		Points
1	(United States) Hilary English	70
2	(United States) Hayley Wolff	63
3	(Switzerland) Erika Gallizzi	63
4	(United States) Mary-Jo Tiampo	62
5	(Sweden) Madeleine Uvhagen	53

- Standings after 9 races.

=== Aerials ===
Rank		Points
1	(Switzerland) Eveline Wirth	71
2	(Switzerland) Conny Kissling	62
3	(Austria) Andrea Amann	59
4	(Canada) Meredith Gardner	54
5	(France) Catherine Frairer	51

- Standings after 9 races.

=== Ballet ===
Rank		Points
1	(United States) Jan Bucher	72
2	(France) Christine Rossi	68
3	(Switzerland) Conny Kissling	63
4	(Canada) Lucie Barma	52
5	(United States) Ellen Breen	50

- Standings after 8 races.

=== Combined ===
Rank		Points
1	(Switzerland) Conny Kissling	48
2	(France) Catherine Frairer	44
3	(Canada) Meredith Gardner	31
4	(Canada) Anna Fraser	25
5	(United States) Anne Gilbert	18

- Standings after 8 races.
