= 1984–85 FIS Freestyle Ski World Cup =

Sixth skiing world cup

Freestyle Skiing World Cup 1984/85
| Discipline | Men | Women |
| Overall | (Canada) Alain LaRoche (2) | (Switzerland) Conny Kissling |
| Moguls | (France) Philippe Bron (2) | (United States) Mary-Jo Tiampo |
| Aerials | (Canada) Lloyd Langlois | (Canada) Meredith Gardner |
| Ballet | (West Germany) Hermann Reitberger | (France) Christine Rossi |
| Combined | (Canada) Alain LaRoche | (Switzerland) Conny Kissling |

Competition
| Locations | 11 | 11 |
| Individual | 37 | 39 |

The 1984/85 FIS Freestyle Skiing World Cup was the sixth World Cup season in freestyle skiing organised by International Ski Federation. The season started on 11 December 1984 and ended on 24 March 1985. This season included four disciplines: aerials, moguls, ballet and combined.

== Men ==
=== Moguls ===
| Num | Season | Date | Place | Event | Winner | Second | Third |
|---|---|---|---|---|---|---|---|
| 40 | 1 | 12 December 1984 | (France) Tignes | MO | (France) Philippe Bron | (France) Éric Berthon | (United States) Steve Desovich |
| 41 | 2 | 11 January 1985 | (Canada) Mont Gabriel | MO | (France) Philippe Bron | (Italy) Mauro Mottini | (France) Philippe Deiber |
| 42 | 3 | 18 January 1985 | (United States) Lake Placid | MO | (United States) Cooper Schell | (France) Philippe Deiber | (United States) Steve Desovich |
| 43 | 4 | 26 January 1985 | (United States) Breckenridge | MO | (Canada) Bill Keenan | (France) Philippe Bron | (United States) Steve Desovich |
| 44 | 5 | 3 February 1985 | (France) Pra-Loup | MO | (United States) Cooper Schell | (France) Éric Berthon | (France) Jean Dutruilh |
| 45 | 6 | 2 March 1985 | (West Germany) Oberjoch | MO | (France) Éric Laboureix | (France) Jean Dutruilh | (United States) Steve Desovich |
| 46 | 7 | 7 March 1985 | (Austria) Mariazell | MO | (United States) Cooper Schell | (United States) Nelson Carmichael | (France) Philippe Deiber |
| 47 | 8 | 12 March 1985 | (Italy) Pila | MO | (Switzerland) Bernard Brandt | (France) Philippe Bron | (Italy) Mauro Mottini |
| 48 | 9 | 16 March 1985 | (France) La Clusaz | MO | (United States) Steve Desovich | (France) Philippe Bron | (France) Éric Laboureix |
| 49 | 10 | 24 March 1985 | (Sweden) Sälen | MO | (United States) Steve Desovich | (France) Philippe Deiber | (France) Philippe Bron |

=== Ballet ===
| Num | Season | Date | Place | Event | Winner | Second | Third |
|---|---|---|---|---|---|---|---|
| 41 | 1 | 11 December 1984 | (France) Tignes | AC | (United States) Lane Spina | (Germany) Georg Fürmeier | (Germany) Hermann Reitberger |
| 42 | 2 | 12 January 1985 | (Canada) Mont Gabriel | AC | (Germany) Hermann Reitberger | (Germany) Richard Schabl | (Canada) Chris Simboli |
| 43 | 3 | 19 January 1985 | (United States) Lake Placid | AC | (Germany) Hermann Reitberger | (Germany) Richard Schabl | (United States) Lane Spina |
| 44 | 4 | 25 January 1985 | (United States) Breckenridge | AC | (Germany) Hermann Reitberger | (Germany) Richard Schabl | (United States) Eric Sampson |
| 45 | 5 | 1 February 1985 | (France) La Sauze | AC | (Germany) Richard Schabl | (Germany) Hermann Reitberger | (Canada) Chris Simboli |
| 46 | 6 | 20 February 1985 | (Socialist Federal Republic of Yugoslavia) Kranjska Gora | AC | (Germany) Hermann Reitberger | (Germany) Richard Schabl | (Canada) Richard Pierce (Canada) Chris Simboli |
| 47 | 7 | 1 March 1985 | (West Germany) Oberjoch | AC | (France) Éric Laboureix | (Germany) Georg Fürmeier | (Canada) Chris Simboli |
| 48 | 8 | 9 March 1985 | (Austria) Mariazell | AC | (Germany) Richard Schabl | (France) Éric Laboureix | (Germany) Hermann Reitberger |
| 49 | 9 | 17 March 1985 | (France) La Clusaz | AC | (Germany) Hermann Reitberger | (Germany) Richard Schabl | (Canada) Jacques Dumaine |
| 50 | 10 | 22 March 1985 | (Sweden) Sälen | AC | (Germany) Hermann Reitberger | (Norway) Rune Kristiansen | (Canada) Richard Pierce |

=== Aerials ===
| Num | Season | Date | Place | Event | Winner | Second | Third |
|---|---|---|---|---|---|---|---|
| 38 | 1 | 13 December 1984 | (France) Tignes | AE | (Canada) Yves LaRoche | (Canada) Alain LaRoche | (France) Didier Méda |
| 39 | 2 | 13 January 1985 | (Canada) Mont Gabriel | AE | (Canada) Lloyd Langlois | (Canada) Alain LaRoche | (United Kingdom) Mike Nemesvary |
| 40 | 3 | 20 January 1985 | (United States) Lake Placid | AE | (Canada) Yves LaRoche | (Canada) Lloyd Langlois | (France) Jean-Marc Bacquin |
| 41 | 4 | 21 January 1985 | (United States) Lake Placid | AE | (Canada) Lloyd Langlois | (Canada) Yves LaRoche | (United Kingdom) Mike Nemesvary |
| 42 | 5 | 27 January 1985 | (United States) Breckenridge | AE | (Canada) Lloyd Langlois | (United Kingdom) Mike Nemesvary | (France) Didier Méda |
| 43 | 6 | 2 February 1985 | (France) La Sauze | AE | (France) Jean-Marc Bacquin | (Canada) Lloyd Langlois | (United Kingdom) Mike Nemesvary |
| 44 | 7 | 21 February 1985 | (Socialist Federal Republic of Yugoslavia) Kranjska Gora | AE | (Canada) Lloyd Langlois | (France) Jean-Marc Bacquin | (Canada) Chris Simboli |
| 45 | 8 | 3 March 1985 | (West Germany) Oberjoch | AE | (Canada) Lloyd Langlois | (Canada) Alain LaRoche | (United States) Kris Feddersen |
| 46 | 9 | 23 March 1985 | (Sweden) Sälen | AE | (Canada) Lloyd Langlois | (Canada) Chris Simboli | (Canada) Alain LaRoche |

=== Combined ===
| Num | Season | Date | Place | Event | Winner | Second | Third |
|---|---|---|---|---|---|---|---|
| 37 | 1 | 13 December 1984 | (France) Tignes | CO | (Canada) Alain LaRoche | (France) Éric Laboureix | (United States) Bruce Bolesky |
| 38 | 2 | 13 January 1985 | (Canada) Mont Gabriel | CO | (Canada) Alain LaRoche | (United Kingdom) Mike Nemesvary | (United States) Bruce Bolesky |
| 39 | 3 | 20 January 1985 | (United States) Lake Placid | CO | (Canada) Alain LaRoche | (Canada) Chris Simboli | (France) Éric Laboureix |
| 40 | 4 | 27 January 1985 | (United States) Breckenridge | CO | (Canada) Alain LaRoche | (Canada) Chris Simboli | (France) Éric Laboureix |
| 41 | 5 | 3 February 1985 | (France) Pra-Loup | CO | (France) Éric Laboureix | (Canada) Alain LaRoche | (Canada) Murray Cluff |
| 42 | 6 | 3 March 1985 | (West Germany) Oberjoch | CO | (France) Éric Laboureix | (United States) John Witt | (Canada) Chris Simboli |
| 43 | 7 | 12 March 1985 | (Italy) Pila | CO | (Canada) Alain LaRoche | (Canada) Chris Simboli | (United Kingdom) Mike Nemesvary |
| 44 | 8 | 24 March 1985 | (Sweden) Sälen | CO | (Canada) Alain LaRoche | (Canada) Murray Cluff | (Canada) Chris Simboli |

== Ladies ==
=== Moguls ===
| Num | Season | Date | Place | Event | Winner | Second | Third |
|---|---|---|---|---|---|---|---|
| 40 | 1 | 12 December 1984 | (France) Tignes | MO | (France) Catherine Frarier | (Switzerland) Erika Gallizzi | (United States) Mary-Jo Tiampo |
| 41 | 2 | 11 January 1985 | (Canada) Mont Gabriel | MO | (United States) Hayley Wolff | (France) Catherine Frarier | (Switzerland) Erika Gallizzi |
| 42 | 3 | 18 January 1985 | (United States) Lake Placid | MO | (Switzerland) Conny Kissling | (United States) Mary-Jo Tiampo | (France) Catherine Frarier |
| 43 | 4 | 26 January 1985 | (United States) Breckenridge | MO | (United States) Hayley Wolff | (Sweden) Madeleine Uvhagen | (France) Catherine Frarier |
| 44 | 5 | 3 February 1985 | (France) Pra-Loup | MO | (United States) Mary-Jo Tiampo | (United States) Hayley Wolff | (Norway) Charlotte Zaccariassen |
| 45 | 6 | 2 March 1985 | (West Germany) Oberjoch | MO | (United States) Mary-Jo Tiampo | (Italy) Laura Colnaghi | (United States) Hayley Wolff |
| 46 | 7 | 7 March 1985 | (Austria) Mariazell | MO | (United States) Mary-Jo Tiampo | (Italy) Silvia Marciandi | (Switzerland) Conny Kissling |
| 47 | 8 | 12 March 1985 | (Italy) Pila | MO | (Italy) Silvia Marciandi | (Canada) LeeLee Morrison | (United States) Mary-Jo Tiampo |
| 48 | 9 | 16 March 1985 | (France) La Clusaz | MO | (United States) Hayley Wolff | (Italy) Silvia Marciandi | (Canada) LeeLee Morrison |
| 49 | 10 | 24 March 1985 | (Sweden) Sälen | MO | (United States) Mary-Jo Tiampo | (France) Catherine Frarier | (Switzerland) Erika Gallizzi |

=== Ballet ===
| Num | Season | Date | Place | Event | Winner | Second | Third |
|---|---|---|---|---|---|---|---|
| 41 | 1 | 11 December 1984 | (France) Tignes | AC | (France) Christine Rossi | (United States) Jan Bucher | (United States) Ellen Breen |
| 42 | 2 | 12 January 1985 | (Canada) Mont Gabriel | AC | (United States) Jan Bucher | (Switzerland) Conny Kissling | (United States) Ellen Breen |
| 43 | 3 | 19 January 1985 | (United States) Lake Placid | AC | (Switzerland) Conny Kissling | (France) Christine Rossi | (United States) Jan Bucher |
| 44 | 4 | 25 January 1985 | (United States) Breckenridge | AC | (United States) Jan Bucher | (Switzerland) Conny Kissling | (France) Christine Rossi |
| 45 | 5 | 1 February 1985 | (France) La Sauze | AC | (France) Christine Rossi | (United States) Jan Bucher | (Switzerland) Conny Kissling |
| 46 | 6 | 20 February 1985 | (Socialist Federal Republic of Yugoslavia) Kranjska Gora | AC | (Switzerland) Conny Kissling | (France) Christine Rossi | (United States) Jan Bucher |
| 47 | 7 | 1 March 1985 | (West Germany) Oberjoch | AC | (France) Christine Rossi | (United States) Jan Bucher | (Canada) Lucie Barma |
| 48 | 8 | 9 March 1985 | (Austria) Mariazell | AC | (France) Christine Rossi | (United States) Jan Bucher | (Switzerland) Conny Kissling |
| 49 | 9 | 17 March 1985 | (France) La Clusaz | AC | (France) Christine Rossi | (United States) Jan Bucher | (Switzerland) Conny Kissling |
| 50 | 10 | 22 March 1985 | (Sweden) Sälen | AC | (United States) Jan Bucher | (France) Christine Rossi | (Canada) Lucie Barma |

=== Aerials ===
| Num | Season | Date | Place | Event | Winner | Second | Third |
|---|---|---|---|---|---|---|---|
| 38 | 1 | 13 December 1984 | (France) Tignes | AE | (Canada) Meredith Gardner | (Switzerland) Conny Kissling | (Sweden) Carin Hernskog |
| 39 | 2 | 13 January 1985 | (Canada) Mont Gabriel | AE | (Switzerland) Conny Kissling | (Austria) Andrea Amann | (United States) Dorene Bourque |
| 40 | 3 | 20 January 1985 | (United States) Lake Placid | AE | (United States) Maria Quintana | (Switzerland) Conny Kissling | (Canada) Meredith Gardner |
| 41 | 4 | 21 January 1985 | (United States) Lake Placid | AE | (Canada) Meredith Gardner | (United States) Maria Quintana | (Austria) Andrea Amann |
| 42 | 5 | 27 January 1985 | (United States) Breckenridge | AE | (Canada) Meredith Gardner | (Switzerland) Conny Kissling | (Austria) Andrea Amann |
| 43 | 6 | 2 February 1985 | (France) La Sauze | AE | (Canada) Meredith Gardner | (Switzerland) Conny Kissling | (Sweden) Carin Hernskog |
| 44 | 7 | 21 February 1985 | (Socialist Federal Republic of Yugoslavia) Kranjska Gora | AE | (Canada) Meredith Gardner | (Switzerland) Conny Kissling | (Canada) Anna Fraser |
| 45 | 8 | 3 March 1985 | (West Germany) Oberjoch | AE | (Canada) Meredith Gardner | (Sweden) Carin Hernskog | (United States) Maria Quintana |
| 46 | 9 | 18 March 1985 | (France) La Clusaz | AE | (Canada) Meredith Gardner | (Sweden) Carin Hernskog | (Canada) Anna Fraser |
| 47 | 10 | 23 March 1985 | (Sweden) Sälen | AE | (Sweden) Susanna Antonsson | (Austria) Andrea Amann | (Canada) Meredith Gardner |

=== Combined ===
| Num | Season | Date | Place | Event | Winner | Second | Third |
|---|---|---|---|---|---|---|---|
| 37 | 1 | 13 December 1984 | (France) Tignes | CO | (Switzerland) Conny Kissling | (Canada) Meredith Gardner | (Canada) Anna Fraser |
| 38 | 2 | 13 January 1985 | (Canada) Mont Gabriel | CO | (Switzerland) Conny Kissling | (Canada) Meredith Gardner | (Canada) Anna Fraser |
| 39 | 3 | 20 January 1985 | (United States) Lake Placid | CO | (Switzerland) Conny Kissling | (Canada) Meredith Gardner | (United States) Anne Dowling |
| 40 | 4 | 27 January 1985 | (United States) Breckenridge | CO | (Switzerland) Conny Kissling | (Canada) Meredith Gardner | (Canada) Anna Fraser |
| 41 | 5 | 3 February 1985 | (France) Pra-Loup | CO | (Switzerland) Conny Kissling | (Italy) Silvia Marciandi | (Canada) Meredith Gardner |
| 42 | 6 | 3 March 1985 | (West Germany) Oberjoch | CO | (Switzerland) Conny Kissling | (Canada) Meredith Gardner | (Italy) Silvia Marciandi |
| 43 | 7 | 12 March 1985 | (Italy) Pila | CO | (Switzerland) Conny Kissling | (Italy) Silvia Marciandi | (Canada) Anna Fraser |
| 44 | 8 | 18 March 1985 | (France) La Clusaz | CO | (Italy) Silvia Marciandi | (Canada) Anna Fraser | (Canada) Meredith Gardner |
| 45 | 9 | 24 March 1985 | (Sweden) Sälen | CO | (Canada) Janice Cannon | (Canada) Meredith Gardner | (Canada) Anna Fraser |

== Men's standings ==
=== Overall ===
| Rank | | Points |
|---|---|---|
| 1 | (Canada) Alain LaRoche | 71 |
| 2 | (France) Éric Laboureix | 64 |
| 3 | (Canada) Chris Simboli | 58 |
| 4 | (United Kingdom) Mike Nemesvary | 55 |
| 5 | (United States) John Witt | 50 |

- Standings after 37 races.

=== Moguls ===
| Rank | | Points |
|---|---|---|
| 1 | (France) Philippe Bron | 166 |
| 2 | (United States) Steve Desovich | 164 |
| 3 | (United States) Cooper Schell | 151 |
| 4 | (France) Jean Dutruilh | 145 |
| 5 | (France) Philippe Deiber | 144 |

- Standings after 10 races.

=== Aerials ===
| Rank | | Points |
|---|---|---|
| 1 | (Canada) Lloyd Langlois | 150 |
| 2 | (Canada) Alain LaRoche | 139 |
| 3 | (Canada) Yves LaRoche | 136 |
| 4 | (United Kingdom) Mike Nemesvary | 136 |
| 5 | (France) Jean-Marc Bacquin | 133 |

- Standings after 9 races.

=== Ballet ===
| Rank | | Points |
|---|---|---|
| 1 | (West Germany) Hermann Reitberger | 174 |
| 2 | (West Germany) Richard Schabl | 170 |
| 3 | (France) Éric Laboureix | 154 |
| 4 | (Canada) Chris Simboli | 153 |
| 5 | (West Germany) Georg Fürmeier | 143 |

- Standings after 10 races.

=== Combined ===
| Rank | | Points |
|---|---|---|
| 1 | (Canada) Alain LaRoche | 90 |
| 2 | (Canada) Chris Simboli | 80 |
| 3 | (France) Éric Laboureix | 79 |
| 4 | (United Kingdom) Mike Nemesvary | 74 |
| 5 | (Canada) Murray Cluff | 69 |

- Standings after 8 races.

== Ladies' standings ==
=== Overall ===
| Rank | | Points |
|---|---|---|
| 1 | (Switzerland) Conny Kissling | 39 |
| 2 | (Canada) Meredith Gardner | 27 |
| 3 | (Canada) Anna Fraser | 20 |
| 4 | (Italy) Silvia Marciandi | 18 |
| 5 | (United States) Melanie Palenik | 13 |

- Standings after 39 races.

=== Moguls ===
| Rank | | Points |
|---|---|---|
| 1 | (United States) Mary-Jo Tiampo | 79 |
| 2 | (United States) Hayley Wolff | 70 |
| 3 | (France) Catherine Frarier | 70 |
| 4 | (Switzerland) Conny Kissling | 63 |
| 5 | (Switzerland) Erika Gallizzi | 61 |

- Standings after 10 races.

=== Aerials ===
| Rank | | Points |
|---|---|---|
| 1 | (Canada) Meredith Gardner | 84 |
| 2 | (Switzerland) Conny Kissling | 76 |
| 3 | (Austria) Andrea Amann | 69 |
| 4 | (United States) Maria Quintana | 64 |
| 5 | (Canada) Anna Fraser | 57 |

- Standings after 10 races.

=== Ballet ===
| Rank | | Points |
|---|---|---|
| 1 | (France) Christine Rossi | 82 |
| 2 | (United States) Jan Bucher | 80 |
| 3 | (Switzerland) Conny Kissling | 76 |
| 4 | (Canada) Lucie Barma | 65 |
| 5 | (United States) Ellen Breen | 62 |

- Standings after 10 races.

=== Combined ===
| Rank | | Points |
|---|---|---|
| 1 | (Switzerland) Conny Kissling | 48 |
| 2 | (Canada) Meredith Gardner | 42 |
| 3 | (Canada) Anna Fraser | 37 |
| 4 | (Italy) Silvia Marciandi | 32 |
| 5 | (United States) Melanie Palenik | 27 |

- Standings after 9 races.
