= 1985–86 FIS Freestyle Ski World Cup =

1985 freestyle skiing World Cup

Freestyle Skiing World Cup 1985/86
Discipline	Men	Women
Overall	(France) Éric Laboureix	(Switzerland) Conny Kissling
Moguls	(United States) Steve Desovich	(United States) Mary-Jo Tiampo (2)
Aerials	(Canada) Yves LaRoche	(Canada) Anna Fraser
Ballet	(West Germany) Hermann Reitberger	(United States) Jan Bucher
Combined	(France) Éric Laboureix	(Switzerland) Conny Kissling

Competition
Locations	8	8
Individual	27	27

The 1985/86 FIS Freestyle Skiing World Cup was the seventh World Cup season in freestyle skiing organised by International Ski Federation. The season started on 10 December 1985 and ended on 9 March 1986. This season included four disciplines: aerials, moguls, ballet and combined.

== Men ==
=== Aerials ===
Num	Season	Date	Place	Event	Winner	Second	Third
47	1	13 December 1985	(France) Tignes	AE	(Canada) Lloyd Langlois	(Canada) Yves LaRoche	(France) Jean-Marc Bacquin
48	2	12 January 1986	(Canada) Mont Gabriel	AE	(Canada) Yves LaRoche	(Austria) Thomas Überall	(France) Didier Méda
49	3	18 January 1986	(United States) Lake Placid	AE	(Canada) Lloyd Langlois	(Canada) Yves LaRoche	(France) Didier Méda
50	4	19 January 1986	(United States) Lake Placid	AE	(Canada) Lloyd Langlois	(Canada) Yves LaRoche	(Canada) Chris Simboli
51	5	15 February 1986	(Austria) Mariazell	AE	(Canada) Yves LaRoche	(Austria) Thomas Überall	(Canada) Lloyd Langlois
52	6	16 Feb 1986	(Austria) Mariazell	AE	(Canada) Yves LaRoche	(France) Jean-Marc Bacquin	(Austria) Thomas Überall
53	7	2 March 1986	(West Germany) Oberjoch	AE	(Canada) Lloyd Langlois	(Canada) Yves LaRoche	(France) Jean-Marc Bacquin
54	8	9 March 1986	(Norway) Voss	AE	(Canada) Yves LaRoche	(Canada) Lloyd Langlois	(France) Jean-Marc Bacquin

=== Ballet ===
Num	Season	Date	Place	Event	Winner	Second	Third
51	1	10 December 1985	(France) Tignes	AC	(West Germany) Hermann Reitberger	(United States) Lane Spina	(Canada) Richard Pierce
52	2	17 December 1985	(Switzerland) Zermatt	AC	(West Germany) Richard Schabl	(United States) Lane Spina	(France) Éric Laboureix
53	3	10 January 1986	(Canada) Mont Gabriel	AC	(West Germany) Hermann Reitberger	(West Germany) Georg Fürmeier	(Canada) Richard Pierce
54	4	23 January 1986	(United States) Breckenridge	AC	(West Germany) Hermann Reitberger	(United States) Lane Spina	(United States) Seth Goldsmith
55	5	24 January 1986	(United States) Breckenridge	AC	(West Germany) Hermann Reitberger	(United States) Lane Spina	(Canada) Dave Walker
56	6	28 February 1986	(West Germany) Oberjoch	AC	(West Germany) Hermann Reitberger	(West Germany) Georg Fürmeier	(United States) Seth Goldsmith
57	7	8 March 1986	(Norway) Voss	AC	(United States) Lane Spina	(West Germany) Hermann Reitberger	(United States) Seth Goldsmith

=== Moguls ===
Num	Season	Date	Place	Event	Winner	Second	Third
50	1	12 December 1985	(France) Tignes	MO	(United States) Steve Desovich	(France) Bruno Bertrand	(France) Philippe Deiber
51	2	11 January 1986	(Canada) Mont Gabriel	MO	(United States) Steve Desovich	(France) Éric Berthon	(Finland) Martti Kellokumpu
52	3	17 January 1986	(United States) Lake Placid	MO	(Finland) Martti Kellokumpu	(Sweden) Henrik Oskarsson	(Switzerland) Petsch Moser
53	4	25 January 1986	(United States) Breckenridge	MO	(United States) Steve Desovich	(France) Philippe Deiber	(United States) Chuck Martin
54	5	1 March 1986	(West Germany) Oberjoch	MO	(Sweden) Henrik Oskarsson	(United States) Steve Desovich	(France) Éric Berthon
55	6	7 March 1986	(Norway) Voss	MO	(Finland) Martti Kellokumpu	(United States) Steve Desovich	(Sweden) Henrik Oskarsson

=== Combined ===
Num	Season	Date	Place	Event	Winner	Second	Third
45	1	13 December 1985	(France) Tignes	CO	(France) Éric Laboureix	(Canada) Alain LaRoche	(Canada) Murray Cluff
46	2	12 January 1986	(Canada) Mont Gabriel	CO	(United States) John Witt	(Canada) Chris Simboli	(France) Éric Laboureix
47	3	23 January 1986	(United States) Breckenridge	CO	(Canada) Alain LaRoche	(France) Éric Laboureix	(United States) John Witt
48	4	25 January 1986	(United States) Breckenridge	CO	(United States) Chuck Martin	(United States) John Witt	(France) Éric Laboureix
49	5	2 March 1986	(West Germany) Oberjoch	CO	(France) Éric Laboureix	(Canada) Chris Simboli	(Canada) Alain LaRoche
50	6	9 March 1986	(Norway) Voss	CO	(Canada) Chris Simboli	(France) Éric Laboureix	(United States) John Witt

== Ladies ==
=== Aerials ===
Num	Season	Date	Place	Event	Winner	Second	Third
48	1	13 December 1985	(France) Tignes	AE	(Austria) Andrea Amann	(Canada) Meredith Gardner	(Canada) Anna Fraser
49	2	12 January 1986	(Canada) Mont Gabriel	AE	(Sweden) Susanna Antonsson	(Sweden) Carin Hernskog	(Canada) Meredith Gardner
50	3	18 January 1986	(United States) Lake Placid	AE	(Canada) Anna Fraser	(Sweden) Carin Hernskog	(Sweden) Susanna Antonsson
51	4	19 January 1986	(United States) Lake Placid	AE	(Sweden) Carin Hernskog	(United States) Maria Quintana	(Canada) Anna Fraser
52	5	15 February 1986	(Austria) Mariazell	AE	(Canada) Anna Fraser	(Canada) Meredith Gardner	(France) Catherine Lombard
53	6	16 February 1986	(Austria) Mariazell	AE	(Canada) Anna Fraser	(Sweden) Carin Hernskog	(Sweden) Susanna Antonsson
54	7	2 March 1986	(West Germany) Oberjoch	AE	(Canada) Meredith Gardner	(Sweden) Carin Hernskog	(Sweden) Susanna Antonsson
55	8	9 March 1986	(Norway) Voss	AE	(Canada) Anna Fraser	(Sweden) Carin Hernskog	(Sweden) Susanna Antonsson

=== Ballet ===
Num	Season	Date	Place	Event	Winner	Second	Third
51	1	10 December 1985	(France) Tignes	AC	(Canada) Lucie Barma	(Switzerland) Conny Kissling	(France) Christine Rossi
52	2	17 December 1985	(Switzerland) Zermatt	AC	(United States) Jan Bucher	(Canada) Lucie Barma	(United States) Ellen Breen
53	3	10 January 1986	(Canada) Mont Gabriel	AC	(United States) Jan Bucher	(France) Christine Rossi	(Switzerland) Conny Kissling
54	4	23 January 1986	(United States) Breckenridge	AC	(United States) Jan Bucher	(France) Christine Rossi	(United States) Ellen Breen
55	5	24 January 1986	(United States) Breckenridge	AC	(United States) Jan Bucher	(United States) Ellen Breen	(France) Christine Rossi
56	6	28 February 1986	(West Germany) Oberjoch	AC	(United States) Jan Bucher	(France) Christine Rossi	(Switzerland) Conny Kissling
57	7	8 March 1986	(Norway) Voss	AC	(United States) Jan Bucher	(France) Christine Rossi	(Switzerland) Conny Kissling

=== Moguls ===
Num	Season	Date	Place	Event	Winner	Second	Third
50	1	12 December 1985	(France) Tignes	MO	(Canada) LeeLee Morrison	(United States) Hayley Wolff	(United States) Mary-Jo Tiampo
51	2	11 January 1986	(Canada) Mont Gabriel	MO	(United States) Mary-Jo Tiampo	(France) Catherine Frarier	(Austria) Renee Svardsjoe
52	3	17 January 1986	(United States) Lake Placid	MO	(France) Catherine Frarier	(Switzerland) Conny Kissling	(United States) Hilary English
53	4	25 January 1986	(United States) Breckenridge	MO	(France) Catherine Frarier	(United States) Hayley Wolff	(Italy) Silvia Marciandi
54	5	1 March 1986	(West Germany) Oberjoch	MO	(United States) Mary-Jo Tiampo	(France) Catherine Frarier	(Italy) Silvia Marciandi
55	6	7 March 1986	(Norway) Voss	MO	(United States) Mary-Jo Tiampo	(Canada) LeeLee Morrison	(United States) Liz McIntyre

=== Combined ===
Num	Season	Date	Place	Event	Winner	Second	Third
46	1	13 December 1985	(France) Tignes	CO	(Canada) Meredith Gardner	(Italy) Silvia Marciandi	(Switzerland) Conny Kissling
47	2	12 January 1986	(Canada) Mont Gabriel	CO	(Switzerland) Conny Kissling	(Canada) Meredith Gardner	(Canada) Anna Fraser
48	3	23 January 1986	(United States) Breckenridge	CO	(Canada) Meredith Gardner	(Canada) Anna Fraser	(Switzerland) Conny Kissling
49	4	25 January 1986	(United States) Breckenridge	CO	(Switzerland) Conny Kissling	(Canada) Anna Fraser	(Italy) Silvia Marciandi
50	5	2 March 1986	(West Germany) Oberjoch	CO	(Switzerland) Conny Kissling	(Canada) Meredith Gardner	(Canada) Anna Fraser
51	6	9 March 1986	(Norway) Voss	CO	(Switzerland) Conny Kissling	(Canada) Anna Fraser	(Italy) Silvia Marciandi

== Men's standings ==
=== Overall ===
Rank		Points
1	(United States) Jeff Iverson	72
2	(Canada) Chris Simboli	54
3	(United States) John Witt	51
4	(Canada) Alain LaRoche	50
5	(United States) Chuck Martin	43

- Standings after 27 races.

=== Moguls ===
Rank		Points
1	(United States) Steve Desovich	99
2	(Finland) Martti Kellokumpu	95
3	(Sweden) Henrik Oskarsson	93
4	(France) Éric Berthon	85
5	(France) Philippe Deiber	84

- Standings after 6 races.

=== Aerials ===
Rank		Points
1	(Canada) Yves LaRoche	148
2	(Canada) Lloyd Langlois	147
3	(France) Jean-Marc Bacquin	137
4	(Austria) Thomas Überall	132
5	(France) Didier Méda	128

- Standings after 8 races.

=== Ballet ===
Rank		Points
1	(West Germany) Hermann Reitberger	125
2	(United States) Lane Spina	121
3	(West Germany) Georg Fürmeier	113
4	(United States) Seth Goldsmith	108
5	(Canada) Dave Walker	103

- Standings after 7 races.

=== Combined ===
Rank		Points
1	(France) Éric Laboureix	58
2	(Canada) Chris Simboli	55
3	(United States) John Witt	55
4	(Canada) Alain LaRoche	54
5	(United States) Chuck Martin	46

- Standings after 6 races.

== Ladies' standings ==
=== Overall ===
Rank		Points
1	(Switzerland) Conny Kissling	34
2	(Canada) Anna Fraser	25
3	(Canada) Meredith Gardner	24
4	(Italy) Silvia Marciandi	17
5	(Norway) Stine Lise Hattestad	13

- Standings after 27 races.

=== Moguls ===
Rank		Points
1	(United States) Mary-Jo Tiampo	46
2	(France) Catherine Frarier	46
3	(Switzerland) Conny Kissling	38
4	(United States) Hayley Wolff	37
5	(Italy) Silvia Marciandi	37

- Standings after 6 races.

=== Aerials ===
Rank		Points
1	(Canada) Anna Fraser	68
2	(Sweden) Carin Hernskog	67
3	(Canada) Meredith Gardner	62
4	(Sweden) Susanna Antonsson	61
5	(United States) Maria Quintana	45

- Standings after 8 races.

=== Ballet ===
Rank		Points
1	(United States) Jan Bucher	60
2	(France) Christine Rossi	54
3	(Canada) Lucie Barma	50
4	(Switzerland) Conny Kissling	50
5	(United States) Ellen Breen	48

- Standings after 7 races.

=== Combined ===
Rank		Points
1	(Switzerland) Conny Kissling	32
2	(Canada) Meredith Gardner	28
3	(Canada) Anna Fraser	27
4	(Italy) Silvia Marciandi	24
5	(Switzerland) Brigitte de Roche	15

- Standings after 6 races.
