= 1982 FIS Freestyle Ski World Cup =

Freestyle skiing competitive season

Freestyle Skiing World Cup 1982
Discipline	Men	Women
Overall	(United States) Frank Beddor (2)	(Canada) Marie-Claude Asselin (2)
Moguls	(France) Nano Pourtier (2)	(United States) Hilary English
Aerials	(Canada) Craig Clow	(Canada) Marie-Claude Asselin
Ballet	(United States) Ian Edmonson	(United States) Jan Bucher
Combined	(United States) Frank Beddor (2)	(Canada) Marie-Claude Asselin

Competition
Locations	13	13
Individual	40	40

The 1982 FIS Freestyle Skiing World Cup was the third World Cup season in freestyle skiing organised by International Ski Federation. The season started on 2 January 1982 and ended on 26 March 1982. This season included four disciplines: aerials, moguls, ballet and combined.

== Men ==
=== Moguls ===
Num	Season	Date	Place	Event	Winner	Second	Third
14	1	2 January 1982	(United States) Snoqualmie	MO	(France) Nano Pourtier	(United States) Frank Beddor	(United States) Tom Bell
15	2	8 January 1982	(Canada) Blackcomb	MO	(France) Nano Pourtier	(Italy) Mauro Mottini	(United States) Frank Beddor
16	3	23 January 1982	(United States) Angel Fire	MO	(France) Nano Pourtier	(Canada) Bill Keenan	(United States) Stuart O'Brein
17	4	29 January 1982	(United States) Sugarbush	MO	(Canada) Bill Keenan	(France) Nano Pourtier	(Sweden) Stefan Engström
18	5	4 February 1982	(Canada) Mont-Sainte-Anne	MO	(France) Nano Pourtier	(France) George Baetz	information is not available
19	6	5 February 1982	(Canada) Mont-Sainte-Anne	MO	(United States) Frank Beddor	(France) Nano Pourtier	(Sweden) Stefan Engström
20	7	26 February 1982	(Italy) Sella Nevea	MO	(Sweden) Stefan Engström	(United States) Frank Beddor	(United States) Bruce Bolesky
21	8	5 March 1982	(Switzerland) Adelboden	MO	(France) Nano Pourtier	(United States) Bruce Bolesky	(United States) Frank Beddor
22	9	14 March 1982	(Italy) Livigno	MO	(Canada) Bill Keenan	(Canada) Peter Judge	(Italy) Andrea Schenk
23	10	21 March 1982	(West Germany) Oberjoch	MO	(France) Philippe Deiber	(United States) Frank Beddor	(France) Jean Dutruilh
24	11	24 March 1982	(France) Tignes	MO	(France) Jean Dutruilh	(France) Philippe Bron	(Italy) Hans Schenk

=== Ballet ===
Num	Season	Date	Place	Event	Winner	Second	Third
15	1	3 January 1982	(United States) Snoqualmie	AC	(West Germany) Hermann Reitberger	(West Germany) Richard Schabl	(United States) Bruce Bolesky
16	2	9 January 1982	(Canada) Blackcomb	AC	(West Germany) Richard Schabl	(West Germany) Hermann Reitberger	(West Germany) Ernst Garhammer
17	3	16 January 1982	(Canada) Calgary	AC	(United States) Ian Edmonson	(West Germany) Hermann Reitberger	(West Germany) Ernst Garhammer
18	4	22 January 1982	(United States) Angel Fire	AC	(United States) Ian Edmonson	(United States) Frank Beddor	(Canada) Peter Judge (France) Jacques Poillion
19	5	26 January 1982	(United States) Poconos	AC	(West Germany) Hermann Reitberger	(West Germany) Ernst Garhammer	(Canada) Daniel Cote
20	6	6 February 1982	(Canada) Mont-Sainte-Anne	AC	(United States) Ian Edmonson	(West Germany) Hermann Reitberger	(Canada) Daniel Côté
21	7	27 February 1982	(Italy) Sella Nevea	AC	(West Germany) Hermann Reitberger	(United States) Ian Edmonson	(West Germany) Ernst Garhammer
22	8	6 March 1982	(Switzerland) Adelboden	AC	(West Germany) Hermann Reitberger	(United States) Ian Edmonson	(West Germany) Ernst Garhammer
23	9	13 March 1982	(Italy) Livigno	AC	(United States) Ian Edmonson	(West Germany) Hermann Reitberger	(West Germany) Ernst Garhammer
24	10	20 March 1982	(West Germany) Oberjoch	AC	(West Germany) Hermann Reitberger	(United States) Ian Edmonson	(West Germany) Ernst Garhammer
25	11	25 March 1982	(France) Tignes	AC	(United States) Ian Edmonson	(Canada) Daniel Côté	(West Germany) Hermann Reitberger

=== Aerials ===
Num	Season	Date	Place	Event	Winner	Second	Third
14	1	10 January 1982	(Canada) Blackcomb	AE	(Canada) Jean-Marc Rozon	(Canada) Jean Corriveau	(Canada) Rick Bowie
15	2	17 January 1982	(Canada) Calgary	AE	(United Kingdom) Mike Nemesvary	(Canada) Craig Clow	(United States) Frank Beddor
16	3	31 January 1982	(Canada) Morin Heights	AE	(Canada) Jean Corriveau	(Canada) Craig Clow	(United Kingdom) Mike Nemesvary
17	4	7 February 1982	(Canada) Mont-Sainte-Anne	AE	(Canada) Jean Corriveau	(Canada) Dominique LaRoche	(Canada) Yves LaRoche
18	5	28 February 1982	(Italy) Sella Nevea	AE	(Canada) Jean Corriveau	(United Kingdom) Mike Nemesvary	(Canada) Craig Clow
19	6	7 March 1982	(Switzerland) Adelboden	AE	(Switzerland) Sandro Wirth	(Canada) Jean-Marc Rozon	(Canada) Dominique LaRoche
20	7	12 March 1982	(Italy) Livigno	AE	(United Kingdom) Mike Nemesvary	(Canada) Jean-Marc Rozon	(Canada) Yves LaRoche
21	8	21 March 1982	(West Germany) Oberjoch	AE	(Canada) Jean Corriveau	(Canada) Craig Clow	(Canada) Dominique LaRoche
22	9	26 March 1982	(France) Tignes	AE	(Canada) Craig Clow	(Switzerland) Sandro Wirth	(Canada) Dominique LaRoche

=== Combined ===
Num	Season	Date	Place	Event	Winner	Second	Third
14	1	10 January 1982	(Canada) Blackcomb	CO	(Canada) Rick Bowie	(United States) Frank Beddor	(United States) Bruce Bolesky
15	2	31 January 1982	(Canada) Morin Heights	CO	(United States) Frank Beddor	(Canada) Peter Judge	(Canada) Rick Bowie
16	3	4 February 1982	(Canada) Mont-Sainte-Anne	CO	(United States) Frank Beddor	(United States) Bruce Bolesky	(Canada) Rick Bowie
17	4	7 February 1982	(Canada) Mont-Sainte-Anne	CO	(Canada) Peter Judge	(United States) Frank Beddor	(Canada) Rick Bowie
18	5	28 February 1982	(Italy) Sella Nevea	CO	(United States) Frank Beddor	(United States) Bruce Bolesky	(Canada) Peter Judge
19	6	7 March 1982	(Switzerland) Adelboden	CO	(United States) Frank Beddor	(United States) Bruce Bolesky	(Canada) Peter Judge
20	7	14 March 1982	(Italy) Livigno	CO	(Canada) Peter Judge	(Canada) Alain LaRoche	(Canada) Dominique LaRoche
21	8	21 March 1982	(West Germany) Oberjoch	CO	(United States) Frank Beddor	(Canada) Alain LaRoche	(United States) Bruce Bolesky
22	9	26 March 1982	(France) Tignes	CO	(United States) Frank Beddor	(Canada) Peter Judge	(Canada) Alain LaRoche

== Ladies ==
=== Moguls ===
Num	Season	Date	Place	Event	Winner	Second	Third
14	1	2 January 1982	(United States) Snoqualmie	MO	(United States) Hilary Engisch	(Canada) Lucie Barma	(Canada) Lisa Downing
15	2	8 January 1982	(Canada) Blackcomb	MO	(United States) Hilary Engisch	(Canada) Jennifer Wilson	(Sweden) Madeleine Uvhagen
16	3	23 January 1982	(United States) Angel Fire	MO	(Sweden) Christina Hornberg	(Canada) Lisa Downing	(United States) Hilary Engisch
17	4	29 January 1982	(United States) Sugarbush	MO	(United States) Hilary Engisch	(Canada) Marie-Claude Asselin	(United States) Hayley Wolff
18	5	4 February 1982	(Canada) Mont-Sainte-Anne	MO	(United States) Hilary Engisch	(Sweden) Christina Hornberg	(Canada) Lucie Barma
19	6	5 February 1982	(Canada) Mont-Sainte-Anne	MO	(United States) Hilary Engisch	(Canada) Lisa Downing	(Switzerland) Erika Gallizzi
20	7	26 February 1982	(Italy) Sella Nevea	MO	(United States) Mary Jo Tiampo	(Canada) Marie-Claude Asselin	(Canada) Lucie Barma
21	8	5 March 1982	(Switzerland) Adelboden	MO	(United States) Hilary Engisch	(Sweden) Christina Hornberg	(United States) Hayley Wolff
22	9	14 March 1982	(Italy) Livigno	MO	(United States) Hilary Engisch	(United States) Mary-Jo Tiampo	(Canada) Lucie Barma
23	10	21 March 1982	(West Germany) Oberjoch	MO	(United States) Hayley Wolff	(United States) Hilary Engisch	(Switzerland) Erika Gallizzi
24	11	24 March 1982	(France) Tignes	MO	(United States) Hilary Engisch	(Canada) Lisa Downing	(Canada) Lucie Barma

=== Ballet ===
Num	Season	Date	Place	Event	Winner	Second	Third
15	1	3 January 1982	(United States) Snoqualmie	AC	(United States) Jan Bucher	(Switzerland) Conny Kissling	(Canada) Lucie Barma
16	2	9 January 1982	(Canada) Blackcomb	AC	(France) Christine Rossi	(United States) Lucie Barma	(West Germany) Monika Fügmann
17	3	16 January 1982	(Canada) Calgary	AC	(France) Christine Rossi	(United States) Jan Bucher	(West Germany) Monika Fügmann
18	4	22 January 1982	(United States) Angel Fire	AC	(United States) Jan Bucher	(Switzerland) Conny Kissling	(West Germany) Monika Fügmann
19	5	26 January 1982	(United States) Poconos	AC	(United States) Jan Bucher	(France) Christine Rossi	(Canada) Lucie Barma
20	6	6 February 1982	(Canada) Mont-Sainte-Anne	AC	(United States) Jan Bucher	(France) Christine Rossi	(Switzerland) Conny Kissling
21	7	27 February 1982	(Italy) Sella Nevea	AC	(United States) Jan Bucher	(Canada) Lucie Barma	(United States) Karen Benker
22	8	6 March 1982	(Switzerland) Adelboden	AC	(United States) Jan Bucher	(Switzerland) Conny Kissling	(France) Christine Rossi
23	9	13 March 1982	(Italy) Livigno	AC	(United States) Jan Bucher	(West Germany) Monika Fügmann	(Canada) Lucie Barma
24	10	20 March 1982	(West Germany) Oberjoch	AC	(United States) Jan Bucher	(Switzerland) Conny Kissling (France) Christine Rossi	
25	11	25 March 1982	(France) Tignes	AC	(France) Christine Rossi	(United States) Jan Bucher	(Switzerland) Conny Kissling

=== Aerials ===
Num	Season	Date	Place	Event	Winner	Second	Third
14	1	10 January 1982	(Canada) Blackcomb	AE	(Canada) Marie-Claude Asselin	(United States) Hayley Wolff	(Switzerland) Eveline Wirth
15	2	17 January 1982	(Canada) Calgary	AE	(Canada) Marie-Claude Asselin	(Switzerland) Conny Kissling	(United States) Betsy Conroy
16	3	31 January 1982	(Canada) Morin Heights	AE	(Canada) Marie-Claude Asselin	(Switzerland) Conny Kissling	(United States) Hayley Wolff
17	4	7 February 1982	(Canada) Mont-Sainte-Anne	AE	(Canada) Marie-Claude Asselin	(Sweden) Maja Berg	(France) Catherine Frarier
18	5	28 February 1982	(Italy) Sella Nevea	AE	(Canada) Marie-Claude Asselin	information is not available	(Sweden) Annika Wignäs
19	6	7 March 1982	(Switzerland) Adelboden	AE	(Canada) Marie-Claude Asselin	(Sweden) Maja Berg	(Switzerland) Conny Kissling
20	7	12 March 1982	(Italy) Livigno	AE	(Sweden) Maja Berg	(Canada) Marie-Claude Asselin	(Switzerland) Conny Kissling
21	8	21 March 1982	(West Germany) Oberjoch	AE	(Sweden) Maja Berg	(Canada) Marie-Claude Asselin	information is not available
22	9	24 March 1982	(France) Tignes	AE	(Canada) Marie-Claude Asselin	(Sweden) Maja Berg	(France) Catherine Frarier

=== Combined ===
Num	Season	Date	Place	Event	Winner	Second	Third
14	1	10 January 1982	(Canada) Blackcomb	CO	(Canada) Marie-Claude Asselin	(United States) Hayley Wolff	(United States) Betsy Conroy
15	2	31 January 1982	(Canada) Morin Heights	CO	(Switzerland) Conny Kissling	(United States) Hayley Wolff	(Canada) Marie-Claude Asselin
16	3	4 February 1982	(Canada) Mont-Sainte-Anne	CO	(Canada) Marie-Claude Asselin	(Switzerland) Conny Kissling	(United States) Hayley Wolff
17	4	7 February 1982	(Canada) Mont-Sainte-Anne	CO	(Canada) Marie-Claude Asselin	(Switzerland) Conny Kissling	(United States) Hayley Wolff
18	5	28 February 1982	(Italy) Sella Nevea	CO	(Canada) Marie-Claude Asselin	(France) Catherine Frarier	(United States) Hayley Wolff
19	6	7 March 1982	(Switzerland) Adelboden	CO	(Canada) Marie-Claude Asselin	(Switzerland) Conny Kissling	(United States) Hayley Wolff
20	7	14 March 1982	(Italy) Livigno	CO	(Switzerland) Eveline Wirth	(Canada) Marie-Claude Asselin	(United States) Betsy Conroy
21	8	21 March 1982	(West Germany) Oberjoch	CO	(Canada) Marie-Claude Asselin	(United States) Hayley Wolff	(Switzerland) Conny Kissling
22	9	26 March 1982	(France) Tignes	CO	(Canada) Marie-Claude Asselin	(France) Catherine Frarier	(Switzerland) Conny Kissling

== Men's standings ==
=== Overall ===
Rank		Points
1	(United States) Frank Beddor	476
2	(Canada) Peter Judge	411
3	(United States) Bruce Bolesky	360
4	(Canada) Alain LaRoche	332
5	(United Kingdom) Mike Nemesvary	275

- Standings after 40 races.

=== Moguls ===
Rank		Points
1	(France) Nano Pourtier	141
2	(United States) Frank Beddor	140
3	(Canada) Bill Keenan	124
4	(France) Jean Dutruilh	121
5	(Sweden) Stefan Engström	121

- Standings after 11 races.

=== Aerials ===
Rank		Points
1	(Canada) Craig Clow	142
2	(Canada) Jean Corriveau	140
3	(United Kingdom) Mike Nemesvary	139
4	(Canada) Jean-Marc Rozon	135
5	(Switzerland) Sandro Wirth	134

- Standings after 9 races.

=== Ballet ===
Rank		Points
1	(United States) Ian Edmonson	149
2	(West Germany) Hermann Reitberger	147
3	(West Germany) Ernst Garhammer	137
4	(West Germany) Richard Schabl	132
5	(United States) Frank Beddor	131

- Standings after 11 races.

=== Combined ===
Rank		Points
1	(United States) Frank Beddor	90
2	(Canada) Peter Judge	84
3	(United States) Bruce Bolesky	80
4	(Canada) Alain LaRoche	72
5	(United Kingdom) Mike Nemesvary	57

- Standings after 9 races.

== Ladies' standings ==
=== Overall ===
Rank		Points
1	(Canada) Marie-Claude Asselin	127
2	(Switzerland) Conny Kissling	99
3	(United States) Hayley Wolff	88
4	(Canada) Lucie Barma	59
5	(United States) Jan Bucher	48

- Standings after 40 races.

=== Moguls ===
Rank		Points
1	(United States) Hilary English	48
2	(United States) Hayley Wolff	33
3	(Canada) Lisa Downing	31
4	(United States) Mary-Jo Tiampo	30
5	(Sweden) Christina Hornberg	28

- Standings after 11 races.

=== Aerials ===
Rank		Points
1	(Canada) Marie-Claude Asselin	48
2	(Sweden) Maja Berg	37
3	(Switzerland) Conny Kissling	35
4	(United States) Hayley Wolff	33
5	(France) Catherine Frairer	23

- Standings after 9 races.

=== Ballet ===
Rank		Points
1	(United States) Jan Bucher	48
2	(France) Christine Rossi	44
3	(Switzerland) Conny Kissling	38
4	(Canada) Lucie Barma	35
5	(West Germany) Monika Fügmann	34

- Standings after 11 races.

=== Combined ===
Rank		Points
1	(Canada) Marie-Claude Asselin	30
2	(Switzerland) Conny Kissling	23
3	(United States) Hayley Wolff	21
4	(France) Catherine Frairer	12
5	(United States) Betsy Conroy	8

- Standings after 9 races.
