= 1981 FIS Freestyle Ski World Cup =

Freestyle skiing competitive season

Freestyle Skiing World Cup 1981
Discipline	Men	Women
Overall	(United States) Frank Beddor	(Canada) Marie-Claude Asselin
Moguls	(France) Nano Pourtier	(United States) Hilary English (2)
Aerials	(Canada) Jean Corriveau	(Canada) Marie-Claude Asselin
Ballet	(United States) Bob Howard (2)	(United States) Jan Bucher (2)
Combined	(United States) Frank Beddor	(Canada) Marie-Claude Asselin

Competition
Locations	11	11
Individual	33	33

The 1981 FIS Freestyle Skiing World Cup was the second World Cup season in freestyle skiing organised by International Ski Federation. The season started on 16 January 1981 and ended on 22 March 1981. This season included four disciplines: aerials, moguls, ballet and combined.

== Men ==
=== Ballet ===
Num	Season	Date	Place	Event	Winner	Second	Third
6	1	17 January 1981	(Italy) Livigno	AC	(United States) Bob Howard	(Canada) Greg Athans	(United States) Frank Beddor
7	2	23 January 1981	(France) Tignes	AC	(United States) Bob Howard	(West Germany) Ernst Garhammer	(United States) Frank Beddor
8	3	31 January 1981	(Switzerland) Laax	AC	(United States) Bob Howard	(United States) Frank Beddor	(Canada) Daniel Côté
9	4	9 February 1981	(Austria) Seefeld	AC	(West Germany) Hermann Reitberger	(United States) Bob Howard	(United States) Frank Beddor
10	5	14 February 1981	(West Germany) Oberjoch	AC	(United States) Bob Howard	(United States) Frank Beddor	(West Germany) Richard Schabl
11	6	28 February 1981	(Canada) Mont-Sainte-Anne	AC	(United States) Bob Howard	(United States) Frank Beddor (Canada) Daniel Côté	
12	7	14 March 1981	(United States) Poconos	AC	(United States) Bob Howard	(United States) Ian Edmondson	(Canada) Greg Athans
13	8	15 March 1981	(United States) Poconos	AC	(United States) Bob Howard	(United States) Ian Edmondson	(West Germany) Richard Schabl
14	9	21 March 1981	(Canada) Calgary	AC	(United States) Bob Howard	(West Germany) Ernst Garhammer	(West Germany) Richard Schabl

=== Moguls ===
Num	Season	Date	Place	Event	Winner	Second	Third
6	1	16 January 1981	(Italy) Livigno	MO	(Canada) Bill Keenan	(United States) Craig Sabina	(France) Philippe Deiber
7	2	22 January 1981	(France) Tignes	MO	(West Germany) Franz Garhammer	(France) Nano Pourtier	(Canada) Greg Athans
8	3	3 February 1981	(Switzerland) Laax	MO	(France) Nano Pourtier	(United States) Frank Beddor	(Switzerland) Franco Zanolari
9	4	4 February 1981	(Switzerland) Laax	MO	(Switzerland) Franco Zanolari	(Canada) Greg Athans	(France) Nano Pourtier
10	5	14 February 1981	(West Germany) Oberjoch	MO	(France) Nano Pourtier	(Canada) Greg Athans	(Canada) Bill Keenan
11	6	18 March 1981	(Canada) Mt Norquay	MO	(France) Nano Pourtier	(Canada) Greg Athans	(United States) Stuart O'Brein
12	7	18 March 1981	(Canada) Mt Norquay	MO	(United States) Frank Beddor	(United States) Craig Sabina	(France) Nano Pourtier
13	8	19 March 1981	(Canada) Mt Norquay	MO	(France) Nano Pourtier	(United States) Frank Beddor	(Canada) John Eaves

=== Aerials ===
Num	Season	Date	Place	Event	Winner	Second	Third
6	1	18 January 1981	(Italy) Livigno	AE	(Canada) Jean Corriveau	(Canada) Jean-Marc Rozon	(United States) Frank Beddor
7	2	24 January 1981	(France) Tignes	AE	(Canada) Jean Corriveau	(Canada) Jean-Marc Rozon	(Canada) Rick Bowie
8	3	1 February 1981	(Switzerland) Laax	AE	(Canada) John Eaves	(Canada) Jean Corriveau	(United States) Frank Beddor
9	4	8 February 1981	(Austria) Seefeld	AE	(Canada) Jean Corriveau	(Canada) Craig Clow	(Canada) John Eaves
10	5	15 February 1981	(West Germany) Oberjoch	AE	(Canada) Jean Corriveau	(United Kingdom) Mike Nemesvary	(Canada) Dominique LaRoche
11	6	1 March 1981	(Canada) Mont-Sainte-Anne	AE	(Canada) Craig Clow	(United States) Frank Beddor	(Canada) Yves LaRoche
12	7	8 March 1981	(Canada) Mont Saint-Sauveur	AE	(United States) Frank Beddor	(Canada) Craig Clow	(Canada) Dominique LaRoche
13	8	22 March 1981	(Canada) Calgary	AE	(Canada) John Eaves	(United Kingdom) Mike Nemesvary	(Canada) Dominique LaRoche

=== Combined ===
Num	Season	Date	Place	Event	Winner	Second	Third
6	1	18 January 1981	(Italy) Livigno	CO	(United States) Frank Beddor	(Canada) Peter Judge	(United States) Frank Beddor
7	2	24 January 1981	(France) Tignes	CO	(West Germany) Franz Garhammer	(Canada) Rick Bowie	(West Germany) Ernst Garhammer
8	3	3 February 1981	(Switzerland) Laax	CO	(United States) Frank Beddor	(Canada) John Eaves	(Canada) Greg Athans
9	4	9 February 1981	(Austria) Seefeld	CO	(United States) Frank Beddor	(Canada) Greg Athans	(Canada) Rick Bowie
10	5	15 February 1981	(West Germany) Oberjoch	CO	(United States) Frank Beddor	(Canada) Greg Athans	(Canada) Peter Judge
11	6	18 March 1981	(Canada) Mt Norquay	CO	(United States) Frank Beddor	(United States) Bruce Bolesky	(Canada) Peter Judge
12	7	18 March 1981	(Canada) Mt Norquay	CO	(France) Bruce Bolesky	(Canada) Peter Judge	(Canada) Murray Cluff
13	8	22 March 1981	(Canada) Calgary	CO	(Canada) John Eaves	(United States) Frank Beddor	(Canada) Peter Judge

== Ladies ==
=== Ballet ===
Num	Season	Date	Place	Event	Winner	Second	Third
6	1	17 January 1981	(Italy) Livigno	AC	(United States) Jan Bucher	(Switzerland) Eveline Wirth	(Canada) Marie-Claude Asselin
7	2	23 January 1981	(France) Tignes	AC	(United States) Jan Bucher	(France) Christine Rossi	(West Germany) Monika Fügmann
8	3	31 January 1981	(Switzerland) Laax	AC	(France) Christine Rossi	(Canada) Renée Lee Smith	(Canada) Marie-Claude Asselin
9	4	9 February 1981	(Austria) Seefeld	AC	(United States) Jan Bucher	(West Germany) Hedy Garhammer	(France) Christine Rossi
10	5	14 February 1981	(West Germany) Oberjoch	AC	(United States) Jan Bucher	(West Germany) Monika Fügmann	(Canada) Marie-Claude Asselin
11	6	28 February 1981	(Canada) Mont-Sainte-Anne	AC	(United States) Jan Bucher	(France) Christine Rossi	(West Germany) Monika Fügmann
12	7	14 March 1981	(United States) Poconos	AC	(United States) Jan Bucher	(United States) Liz Heidenreich	(West Germany) Monika Fügmann
13	8	15 March 1981	(United States) Poconos	AC	(United States) Jan Bucher	(France) Christine Rossi	(West Germany) Monika Fügmann
14	9	21 March 1981	(Canada) Calgary	AC	(United States) Jan Bucher	(France) Christine Rossi	(Switzerland) Eveline Wirth

=== Moguls ===
Num	Season	Date	Place	Event	Winner	Second	Third
6	1	16 January 1981	(Italy) Livigno	MO	(United States) Hilary English	(West Germany) Hedy Garhammer	(Canada) Renée Lee Smith
7	2	22 January 1981	(France) Tignes	MO	(Canada) Marie-Claude Asselin	(Canada) Stéphanie Sloan	(Canada) Renée Lee Smith
8	3	3 February 1981	(Switzerland) Laax	MO	(United States) Hilary English	(Canada) Renée Lee Smith	(Canada) Stéphanie Sloan
9	4	4 February 1981	(Switzerland) Laax	MO	(United States) Hilary English	(United States) Kay Kucera	(Canada) Stéphanie Sloan
10	5	14 February 1981	(West Germany) Oberjoch	MO	(Canada) Renee Lee Smith	(Switzerland) Erika Gallizzi	(West Germany) Hedy Garhammer
11	6	18 March 1981	(Canada) Mt Norquay	MO	(United States) Hilary English	(Canada) Renée Lee Smith	(Canada) Marie-Claude Asselin
12	7	18 March 1981	(Canada) Mt Norquay	MO	(Canada) Renee Lee Smith	(United States) Hilary English	(Canada) Stéphanie Sloan
13	8	19 March 1981	(Canada) Mt Norquay	MO	(United States) Hilary English	(Canada) Stéphanie Sloan	(Canada) Renée Lee Smith

=== Aerials ===
Num	Season	Date	Place	Event	Winner	Second	Third
6	1	18 January 1981	(Italy) Livigno	AE	(Sweden) Maja Berg	(Canada) Marie-Claude Asselin	(Switzerland) Eveline Wirth
7	2	24 January 1981	(France) Tignes	AE	(Canada) Marie-Claude Asselin	(Sweden) Maja Berg	(Canada) Renée Lee Smith
8	3	1 February 1981	(Switzerland) Laax	AE	(Canada) Marie-Claude Asselin	(West Germany) Susi Schmidl	(Sweden) Maja Berg
9	4	8 February 1981	(Austria) Seefeld	AE	(Sweden) Maja Berg	(Canada) Marie-Claude Asselin	(West Germany) Susi Schmidl
10	5	15 February 1981	(West Germany) Oberjoch	AE	(Canada) Marie-Claude Asselin	(West Germany) Susi Schmidl	(United States) Hayley Wolff
11	6	1 March 1981	(Canada) Mont-Sainte-Anne	AE	(Canada) Marie-Claude Asselin	(Sweden) Maja Berg	(Canada) Renée Lee Smith
12	7	8 March 1981	(Canada) Mont Saint-Sauveur	AE	(Sweden) Maja Berg	(Canada) Marie-Claude Asselin	(United States) Hayley Wolff
13	8	22 March 1981	(Canada) Calgary	AE	(Sweden) Maja Berg	(Canada) Marie-Claude Asselin	(Canada) Renée Lee Smith

=== Combined ===
Num	Season	Date	Place	Event	Winner	Second	Third
6	1	18 January 1981	(Italy) Livigno	CO	(Switzerland) Eveline Wirth	(Canada) Marie-Claude Asselin	(Canada) Stéphanie Sloan
7	2	24 January 1981	(France) Tignes	CO	(Canada) Marie-Claude Asselin	(Canada) Stéphanie Sloan	(United States) Betsy Conroy
8	3	3 February 1981	(Switzerland) Laax	CO	(Canada) Marie-Claude Asselin	(Canada) Renée Lee Smith	(Canada) Stéphanie Sloan
9	4	9 February 1981	(Austria) Seefeld	CO	(Canada) Marie-Claude Asselin	(Canada) Stéphanie Sloan	(Canada) Renée Lee Smith
10	5	15 February 1981	(West Germany) Oberjoch	CO	(Canada) Marie-Claude Asselin	(Canada) Renée Lee Smith	(Switzerland) Eveline Wirth
11	6	18 March 1981	(Canada) Mt Norquay	CO	(Canada) Marie-Claude Asselin	(Canada) Renée Lee Smith	(United States) Betsy Conroy
12	7	18 March 1981	(Canada) Mt Norquay	CO	(Canada) Marie-Claude Asselin	(Canada) Stéphanie Sloan	(Canada) Renée Lee Smith
13	8	22 March 1981	(Canada) Calgary	CO	(Canada) Stephanie Sloan	(Canada) Renée Lee Smith	(Switzerland) Eveline Wirth

== Men's standings ==
=== Overall ===
Rank		Points
1	(United States) Frank Beddor	502
2	(Canada) Greg Athans	359
3	(Canada) Peter Judge	354
4	(United States) Bruce Bolesky	340
5	(Canada) Rick Bowie	306

- Standings after 33 races.

=== Moguls ===
Rank		Points
1	(France) Nano Pourtier	147
2	(United States) Frank Beddor	134
3	(Canada) Greg Athans	134
4	(Switzerland) Franco Zanolari	128
5	(Canada) Bill Keenan	126

- Standings after 8 races.

=== Aerials ===
Rank		Points
1	(Canada) Jean Corriveau	142
2	(United States) Frank Beddor	139
3	(Canada) Dominique Laroche	130
4	(Canada) Craig Clow	129
5	(United Kingdom) Mike Nemesvary	122

- Standings after 8 races.

=== Ballet ===
Rank		Points
1	(United States) Bob Howard	150
2	(United States) Frank Beddor	140
3	(West Germany) Richard Schabl	133
4	(West Germany) Ernst Garhammer	130
5	(Canada) Daniel Côté	128

- Standings after 9 races.

=== Combined ===
Rank		Points
1	(United States) Frank Beddor	89
2	(Canada) Peter Judge	79
3	(United States) Bruce Bolesky	74
4	(Canada) Greg Athans	69
5	(Canada) Rick Bowie	67

- Standings after 8 races.

== Ladies' standings ==
=== Overall ===
Rank		Points
1	(Canada) Marie-Claude Asselin	138
2	(Canada) Renee Lee Smith	113
3	(United States) Stephanie Sloan	104
4	(Switzerland) Eveline Wirth	79
5	(France) Christine Rossi	51

- Standings after 33 races.

=== Moguls ===
Rank		Points
1	(United States) Hilary English	47
2	(Canada) Renee Lee Smith	42
3	(United States) Stephanie Sloan	37
4	(Canada) Marie-Claude Asselin	31
5	(United States) Kay Kucera	22

- Standings after 8 races.

=== Aerials ===
Rank		Points
1	(Canada) Marie-Claude Asselin	46
2	(Sweden) Maja Berg	46
3	(Canada) Renee Lee Smith	29
4	(West Germany) Susi Schmidl	26
5	(United States) Hayley Wolff	26

- Standings after 8 races.

=== Ballet ===
Rank		Points
1	(United States) Jan Bucher	48
2	(France) Christine Rossi	42
3	(Germany) Monika Fuegmnann	37
4	(Canada) Marie-Claude Asselin	31
5	(Switzerland) Eveline Wirth	28

- Standings after 9 races.

=== Combined ===
Rank		Points
1	(Canada) Marie-Claude Asselin	30
2	(Canada) Stephanie Sloan	23
3	(Canada) Renee Lee Smith	22
4	(Switzerland) Eveline Wirth	13
5	(United States) Betsy Conroy	6

- Standings after 8 races.
