= Richard Schabl =

German freestyle skier

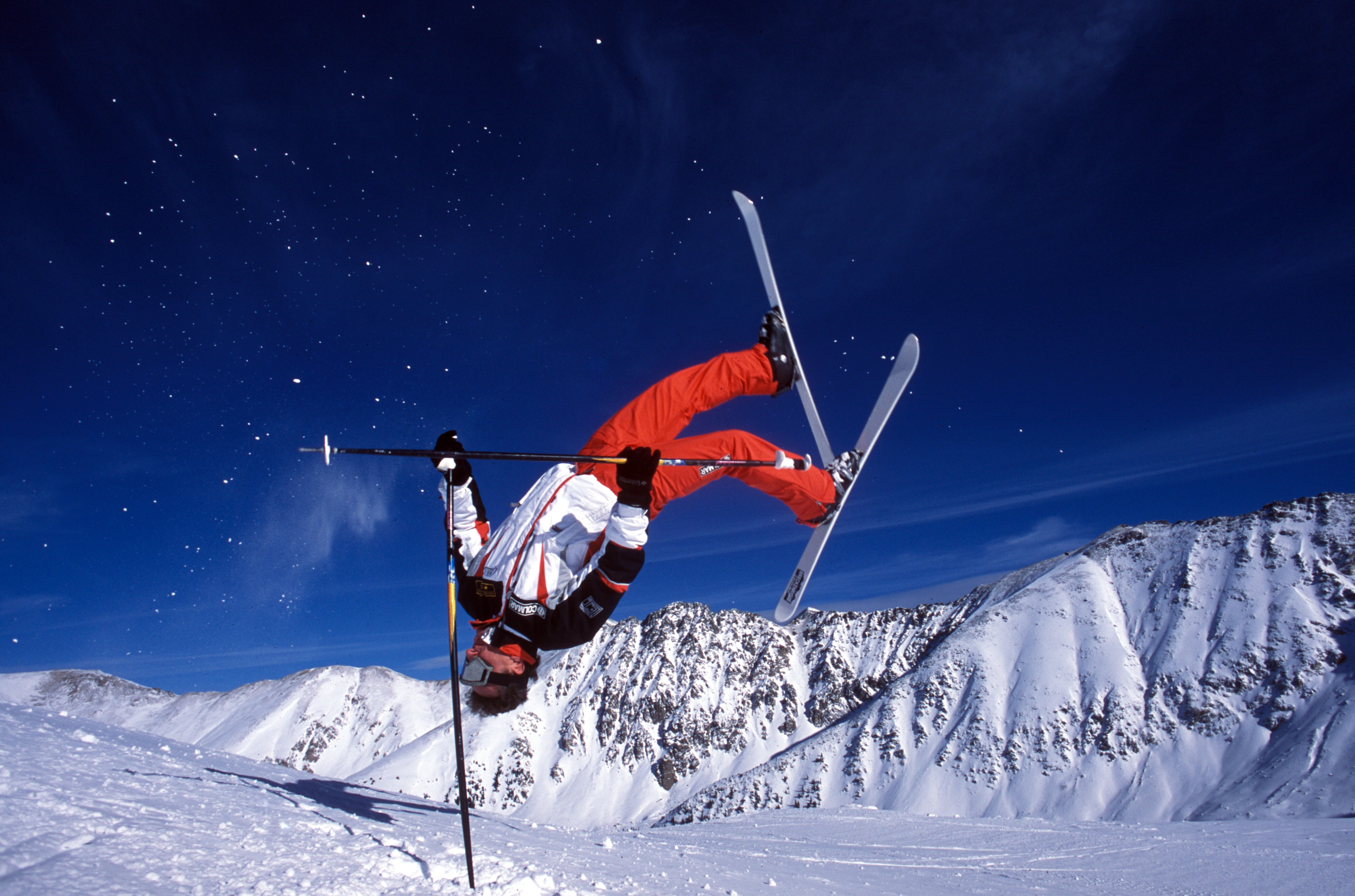
- Schabl performing a one-handed pole flip

Personal information
- Nationality: Germany
- Born: 1959 (age 66–67) West Germany
- Height: 1.77 m (5 ft 10 in)

Sport
- Sport: Skiing

World Cup career
- Seasons: 7 – (1980–1986)
- Indiv. podiums: 28
- Indiv. wins: 12
- Overall titles: 0 – (11th in 1985)
- Discipline titles: 2 – (Ski ballet: 1983, 1984)
Medal record
Freestyle skiing
Representing West Germany
World Championships
Gold medal – first place	1986 Tignes	Ski ballet

Richard Schabl (born 1959) is a German former freestyle skier, specializing in acroski. He won the gold medal at the first FIS Freestyle World Ski Championships in 1986 and the FIS Junior World Championship 1980 in Chamonix and ended his competitive sports career right after when he became the World Champion at the age of 26. Schabl achieved a total of 12 victories in the World Cup and won the ski ballet Crystal Globe in 1983 and 1984 seasons. He invented the one-handed pole flip and owns a unique world record 22 flips in 60 seconds on a ski deck (a revolving carpet). He is also a two-time European Champion in ski ballet, winning the title in 1981 and 1984.

Upon his retirement, Schabl began working on ski films as a producer and actor, and later worked as a photographer for various magazines, including Playboy and Maxim. His feature film project about the Kaprun disaster, Smoke in the Tunnel, has been in production for more than 10 years and scheduled to be released on the 25th anniversary of the catastrophe, 11 November 2025.

== Freestyle skiing results ==
=== World Championships ===
- 1 medal – (1 gold)

Year	Age	Ski ballet
(France) 1986 Tignes	26	1

=== World Cup ===
==== Season titles ====
- 2 titles – (2 ski ballet)

Season
Season	Discipline
1983	Ski ballet
1984	Ski ballet

==== Season standings ====
Season	Age	Overall	Ski ballet
1980	20	48	19
1981	21	18	3
1982	22	26	4
1983	23	16	1
1984	24	13	1
1984–85	25	11	2
1985–86	26	28	8

==== Race podiums ====
- 12 victories
- 28 podiums

No.	Season	Date	Location	Discipline	Place
1	1981	14 February 1981	Oberjoch, West Germany	Ski ballet	3rd
2	1981	15 March 1981	(United States) Poconos, USA	Ski ballet	3rd
3	1981	21 March 1981	Calgary, Canada	Ski ballet	3rd
4	1982	3 January 1982	(United States) Snoqualmie, USA	Ski ballet	2nd
5	1982	9 January 1982	Blackcomb, Canada	Ski ballet	1st
6	1983	3 January 1983	Mariazell, Austria	Ski ballet	1st
7	1983	20 January 1983	Tignes, France	Ski ballet	1st
8	1983	29 January 1983	Oberjoch, West Germany	Ski ballet	2nd
9	1983	2 February 1983	Livigno, Italy	Ski ballet	1st
10	1983	12 February 1983	Ravascletto, Italy	Ski ballet	1st
11	1983	11 March 1983	(United States) Squaw Valley, USA	Ski ballet	2nd
12	1983	17 March 1983	(United States) Angel Fire, USA	Ski ballet	2nd
13	1984	14 January 1984	Stoneham, Canada	Ski ballet	2nd
14	1984	20 January 1984	(United States) Breckenridge, USA	Ski ballet	1st
15	1984	3 February 1984	Courchevel, France	Ski ballet	2nd
16	1984	25 February 1984	Göstling, Austria	Ski ballet	2nd
17	1984	28 February 1984	Ravascletto, Italy	Ski ballet	2nd
18	1984	3 March 1984	Oberjoch, West Germany	Ski ballet	1st
19	1984	20 March 1984	Sälen, Sweden	Ski ballet	1st
20	1984	27 March 1984	Tignes, France	Ski ballet	1st
21	1984–85	11 December 1984	Mont Gabriel, Canada	Ski ballet	2nd
22	1984–85	12 January 1985	(United States) Lake Placid, USA	Ski ballet	2nd
23	1984–85	19 January 1985	(United States) Breckenridge, USA	Ski ballet	2nd
24	1984–85	1 February 1985	La Sauze, France	Ski ballet	1st
25	1984–85	20 February 1985	(Socialist Federal Republic of Yugoslavia) Kranjska Gora, Yugoslavia	Ski ballet	2nd
26	1984–85	9 March 1985	Mariazell, Austria	Ski ballet	1st
27	1984–85	17 March 1985	La Clusaz, France	Ski ballet	2nd
28	1985–86	17 December 1985	Zermatt, Switzerland	Ski ballet	1st
