= Iseler =

Mountain in Bavaria, Germany

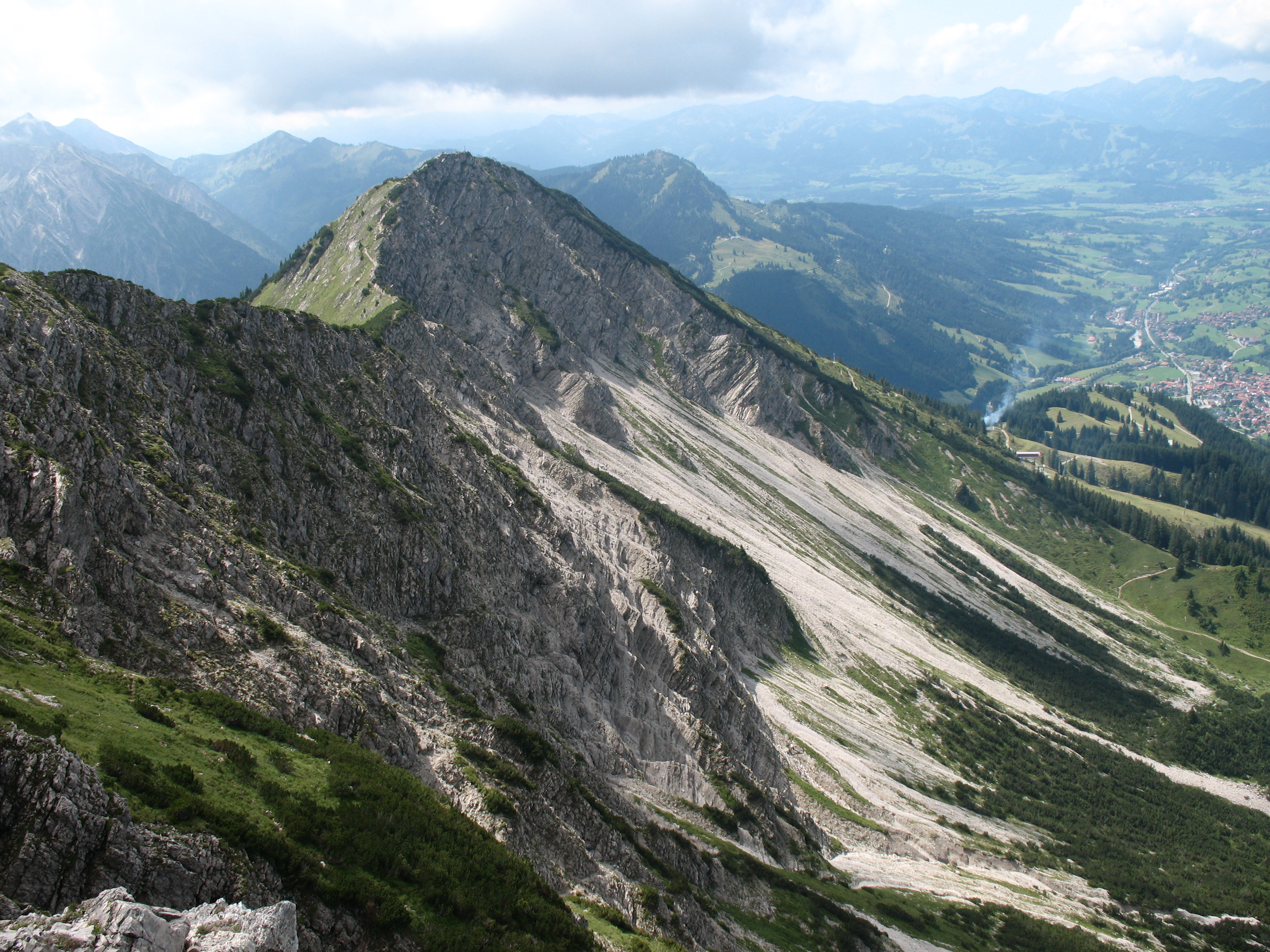
- Iseler north side

Highest point
- Elevation: 1,876 m (6,155 ft)
- Prominence: 56 m (184 ft)
- Coordinates: 47°29′55″N 10°25′04″E

Geography
- Location within Bavaria
- Location: Bavaria, Germany
- Parent range: Allgäu Alps

Iseler is a mountain of Bavaria, Germany, near Bad Hindelang and Oberjoch.

There is a chair lift (Iselerbahn) from Oberjoch up to an elevation of 1,580 m (5,180 ft). The summit is accessible via hiking paths and the Salewa-Klettersteig, a via ferrata which starts at the upper station of the lift.
