= Marie-Claude Asselin =

Canadian freestyle skier

Personal information
- Born: 1962 (age 63–64)
- Height: 5 ft 4 in (1.63 m)

Sport
- Sport: Skiing
- Club: Mont Gabriel Freestyle Ski Club

World Cup career
- Seasons: 1981 - 1984
- Indiv. podiums: 52
- Indiv. wins: 35
- Discipline titles: 5

Marie-Claude Asselin is a Canadian former freestyle skier competing from 1977 to 1982 in which she was a three-time world champion.

== Skiing career ==
Asselin competed from 1977 to 1982 in the aerial, ballet and moguls categories of freestyle skiing. In that time, she won 35 Freestyle World Cup competitions, was the Freestyle World Cup champion in both combined and aerials in 1981, 1982, and 1983 and was the Freestyle World Cup overall champion in 1981 and 1982.

In 1983, Asselin was awarded the Elaine Tanner Trophy for Canadian Female Athlete of the year. Asselin was inducted into the Canadian Ski Hall of Fame in 1991.

=== World Cup podium finishes ===
Race date	Place	Discipline	Position
19-03-1983	Angel Fire	Combined	2
19-03-1983	Angel Fire	Aerials	1
19-03-1983	Angel Fire	Combined	1
19-03-1983	Angel Fire	Aerials	1
18-03-1983	Angel Fire	Moguls	2
13-02-1983	Ravascletto	Combined	1
13-02-1983	Ravascletto	Aerials	1
04-02-1983	Livigno	Aerials	1
04-02-1983	Livigno	Combined	1
22-01-1983	Tignes	Combined	2
22-01-1983	Tignes	Aerials	1
21-01-1983	Tignes	Combined	1
21-01-1983	Tignes	Aerials	1
26-03-1982	Tignes	Aerials	1
26-03-1982	Tignes	Combined	1
21-03-1982	Oberjoch	Combined	1
21-03-1982	Oberjoch	Aerials	2
14-03-1982	Livigno	Combined	2
12-03-1982	Livigno	Aerials	2
07-03-1982	Adelboden	Aerials	1
07-03-1982	Adelboden	Combined	1
28-02-1982	Sella Nevea	Combined	1
28-02-1982	Sella Nevea	Aerials	1
26-02-1982	Sella Nevea	Moguls	2
07-02-1982	Mt. St. Anne	Combined	1
07-02-1982	Mt. St. Anne	Aerials	1
04-02-1982	Mt. St. Anne	Combined	1
31-01-1982	Morin Heights	Combined	3
31-01-1982	Morin Heights	Aerials	1
29-01-1982	Sugarbush	Moguls	2
17-01-1982	Calgary	Aerials	1
10-01-1982	Blackcomb	Combined	1
10-01-1982	Blackcomb	Aerials	1
22-03-1981	Calgary	Aerials	2
18-03-1981	Mt. Norquay	Moguls	3
18-03-1981	Mt. Norquay	Combined	1
18-03-1981	Mt. Norquay	Combined	1
08-03-1981	Poconos	Aerials	2
01-03-1981	Mt. St. Anne	Aerials	1
15-02-1981	Oberjoch	Aerials	1
15-02-1981	Oberjoch	Combined	1
14-02-1981	Oberjoch	Acro	3
09-02-1981	Seefeld	Combined	1
08-02-1981	Seefeld	Aerials	2
03-02-1981	Laax	Combined	1
01-02-1981	Laax	Aerials	1
24-01-1981	Tignes	Combined	1
24-01-1981	Tignes	Aerials	1
22-01-1981	Tignes	Moguls	1
18-01-1981	Livigno	Combined	2
18-01-1981	Livigno	Aerials	2
17-01-1981	Livigno	Acro	3
