= Mount Norquay =

Ski resort in Alberta, Canada

Mt. Norquay
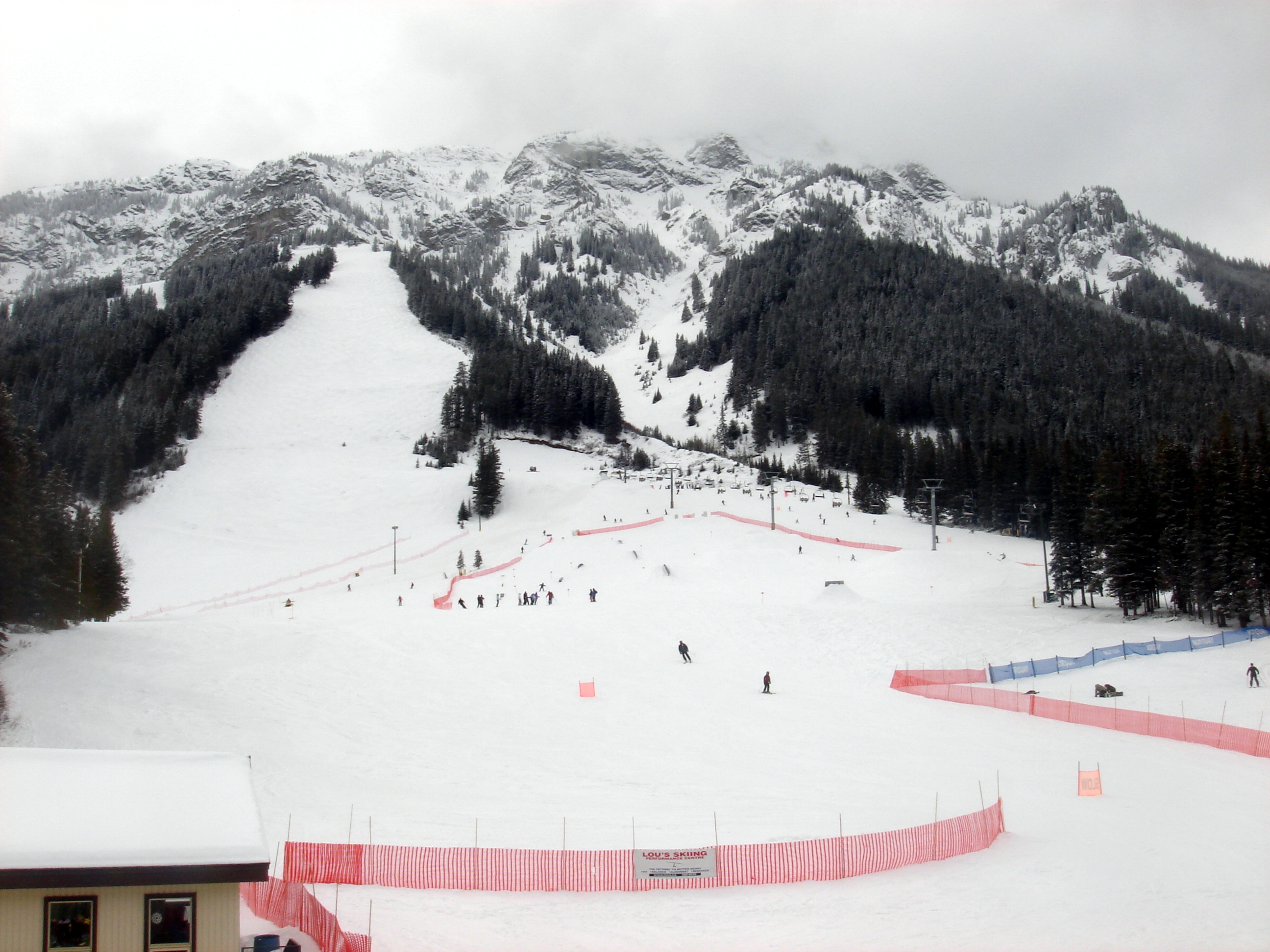
- Mt. Norquay in March 2008

- Location in Canada Mt. Norquay (Alberta)
- Location: Banff National Park, Alberta, Canada
- Nearest city: Banff, Calgary
- Coordinates: 51.204°N 115.599°W
- Vertical: 503 m (1,650 ft)
- Top elevation: 2,133 m (6,998 ft)
- Base elevation: 1,630 m (5,348 ft)
- Skiable area: 0.77 km^{2} (0.30 sq mi)
- Trails: 60
- Longest run: 1,167 m (3,829 ft)
- Lift system: 4 chairlifts: 1 hi-speed quad; 1 fixed-grip double; 2 fixed-grip quads 1 surface lift
- Terrain parks: 1 snowboard park
- Snowfall: 300 cm (120 in) /year
- Snowmaking: 85%
- Night skiing: Wednesday and Friday 5-10pm (January - March)
- Website: BanffNorquay.com

Mt. Norquay is a mountain and ski resort in Banff National Park, Canada, that lies directly northwest of the Town of Banff. The regular ski season starts early December and ends mid-April. Mount Norquay is one of three major ski resorts located in the Banff National Park.

== History ==
The mountain was named in 1904 after John Norquay, premier of Manitoba from 1878 to 1887. Norquay climbed the mountain that now bears his name in 1887 or 1888 but, contrary to some reports, did not actually reach the summit.

The mountain can be scrambled on the western side but involves a number of difficult steps and some exposure. Ascent is not advised while snow persists on the route.

The first ski runs date as far back as 1926, with the opening of the ski lodge in 1929. Rope tows were installed in 1942 and the mountain was the second in Canada to install a chairlift in 1948 (Red Mountain Resort was the first, in 1947), with a vertical drop of 1,400 feet (425 m). Norquay offered three regular big vertical daily awards in the form of a pin for 25,000 feet for a bronze, 30,000 for silver and 35,000 for a gold, that regulars and staffers have collected over the years. In 1978–79 they also had 50 copies of the platinum 50,000 feet as a celebration of 50 years of the clubhouse at Norquay. Since 1978 Ski Norquay has partnered with Ski Banff, Lake Louise, Sunshine to promote its activities. This created a joined up tri-area lift pass system, which includes shuttle bus transport to and from the resort.

In 1991, giant slalom and slalom were held in the resort for the 1991 Winter Deaflympics.

Between October 2006 and February 2018, the Mount Norquay ski resort was owned by a group of Alberta-based investors. This ownership group consisted of Ken Read, a former Olympic and World Cup Olympic alpine ski racer; Len, Peter, and Robert Sudermann of Fortune Resorts; and Stephen Ross of Devonian Properties in Canmore.

Beginning March 2018, the Mount Norquay ski resort has been operating under the legal name, Norquay Mystic Ridge Ltd. which is a wholly owned subsidiary of Liricon Capital Ltd. Adam and Janet Waterous of Banff, Alberta own 1% of the shares of Liricon Capital Ltd.

== Ski racing ==
Mount Norquay has a long history supporting the sport of alpine ski racing. The Dominion Championships were early efforts by the local community to promote winter tourism and Norquay hosted the Championships on three separate occasions. The resort was part of two Olympic Winter Games bids (1964 and 1968) and did host the World Cup in 1972, running giant slalom and slalom races on the North American run.

The resort was also famous for ski jumping, hosting many international competitions. The ski jump is still homologated and was recently used by the Altius Ski Club of Calgary.

Mount Norquay hosts local and international alpine ski races. Athletes associated with Banff Alpine Racers, the resort’s home ski club, have included Thomas Grandi, Cary Mullen, Paul Stutz, Lana Mullen, Marcia Clarke, Trevor Philp, Jeffrey Read and Erik Read.

== Amenities ==
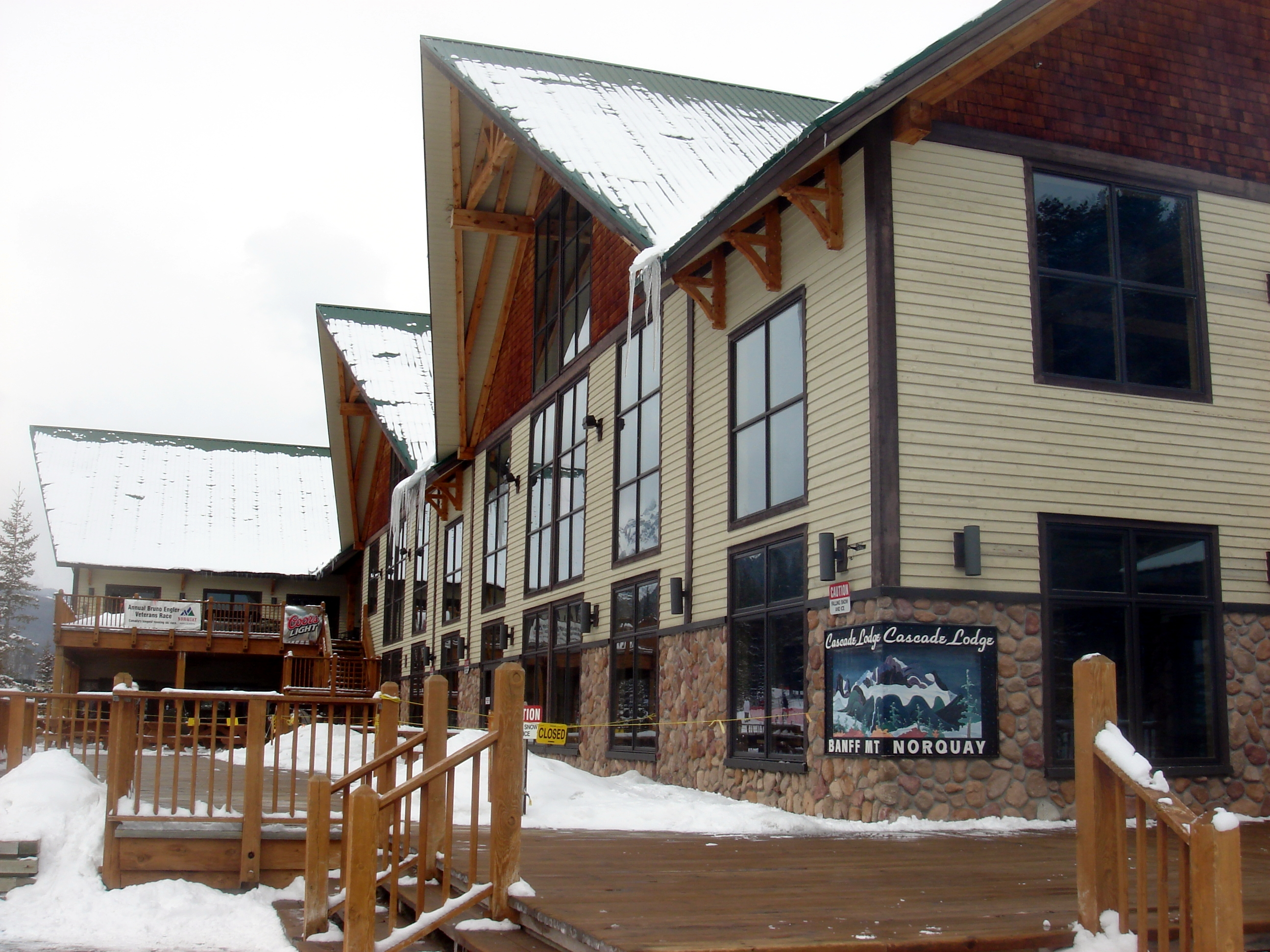
Lodge at Norquay ski resort

=== Terrain ===
There are a total of 60 runs which total 16,382m in length. 85% of the skiing terrain is covered by snow making. The ski area has 3 quad chairs, 1 double chair and a magic carpet. The double chair, North American, services some of the hardest terrain in North America.

With a vertical drop of 503 m (1,650 ft) and 16.4 km (10.2 mi) of runs, it has 20% easy, 36% medium, 28% difficult and 16% expert runs.

On Friday and Saturday nights between December and March, Norquay hosts night skiing between 5–9pm. It is the only Banff resort to offer night skiing. In 2009 Mount Norquay added lift accessed winter snow tubing.

=== Lift System ===
Name	Type	Vertical	Length
A. North American 'Norquay' Chair	2 person fixed-grip chair	396m	945m
B. Sundance Magic Carpet	Surface lift	10m	64m
C. Cascade Chair	4 person fixed-grip chair	122m	579m
D. Spirit Chair	4 person fixed-grip chair	196m	654m
E. Mystic Chair	4 person hi-speed chair	395m	1016m

=== Rental Facilities ===
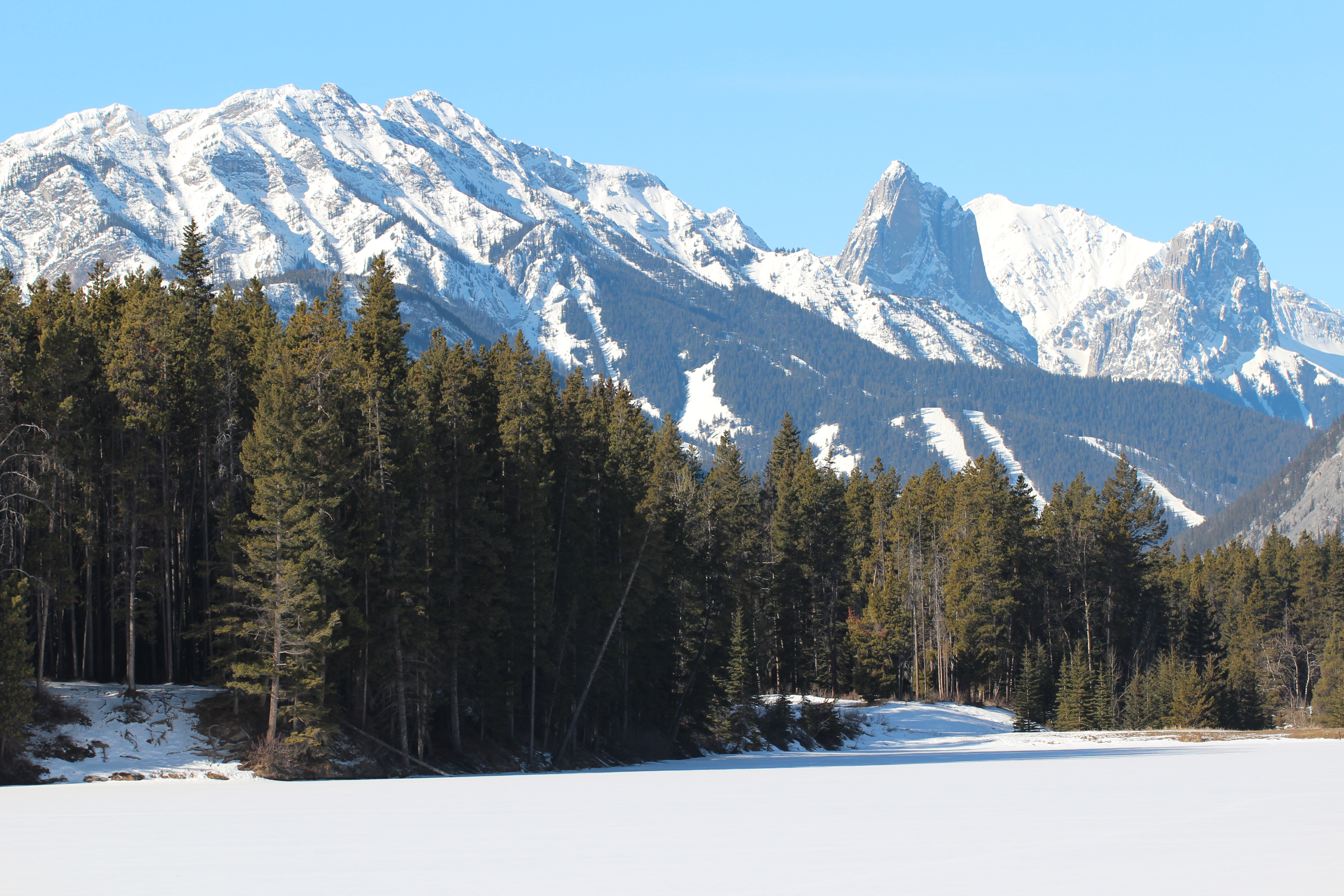
Mount Norquay (upper left) seen from Johnson Lake

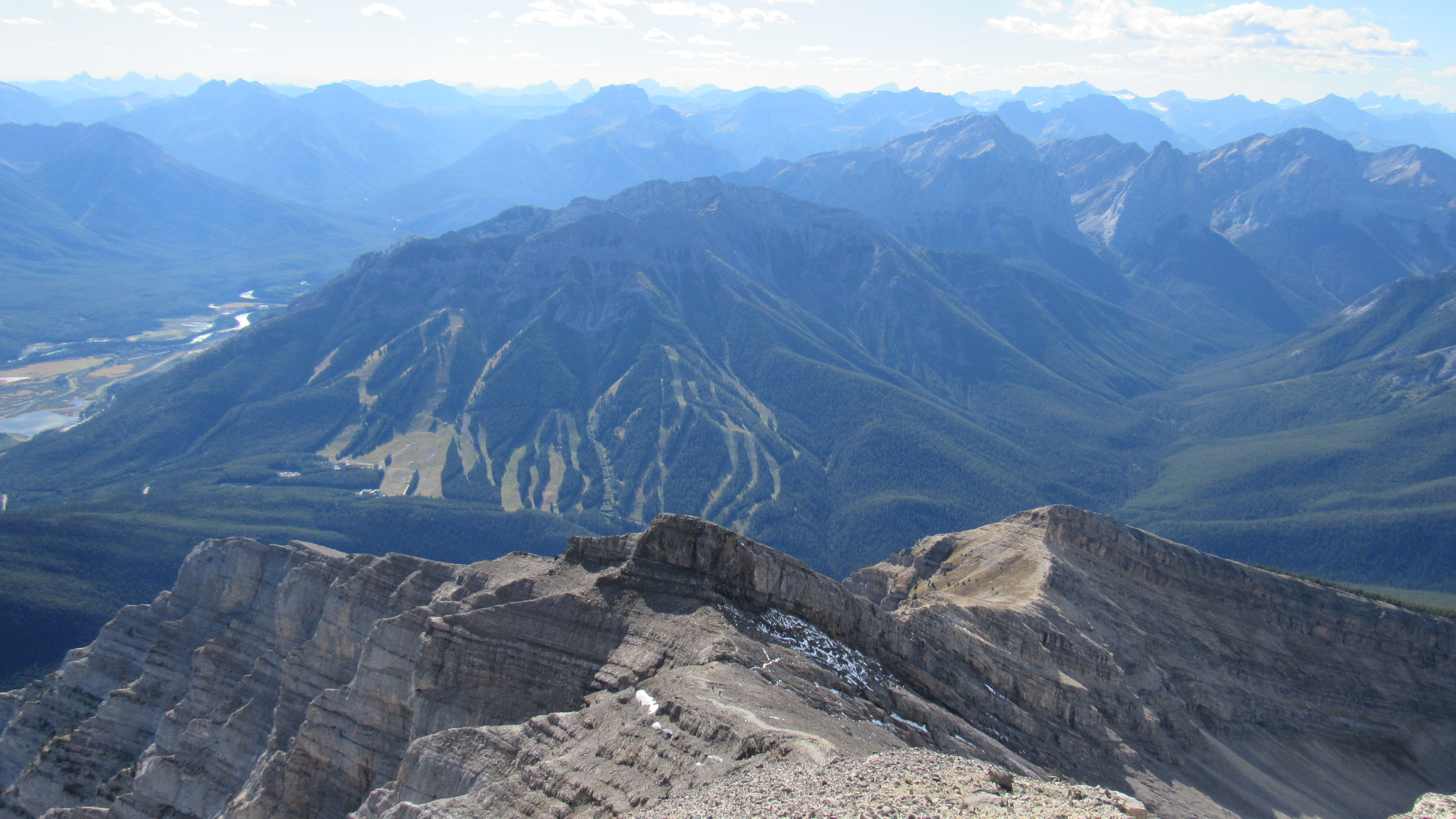
Mount Norquay seen from Cascade Mountain Summit

Norquay is able to provide rental equipment to guests from its rental shop, located opposite Cascade Lodge.

=== Summer Activities ===
The North American chair lift operates for sightseeing in the summer. The lift provides access to the Cliff House Bistro/tea house and, since 2014, the only via ferrata in Banff National Park.

== See also ==
- List of ski areas and resorts in Canada
