= Pila, Piedmont =

Pila
- Comune
- Comune di Pila
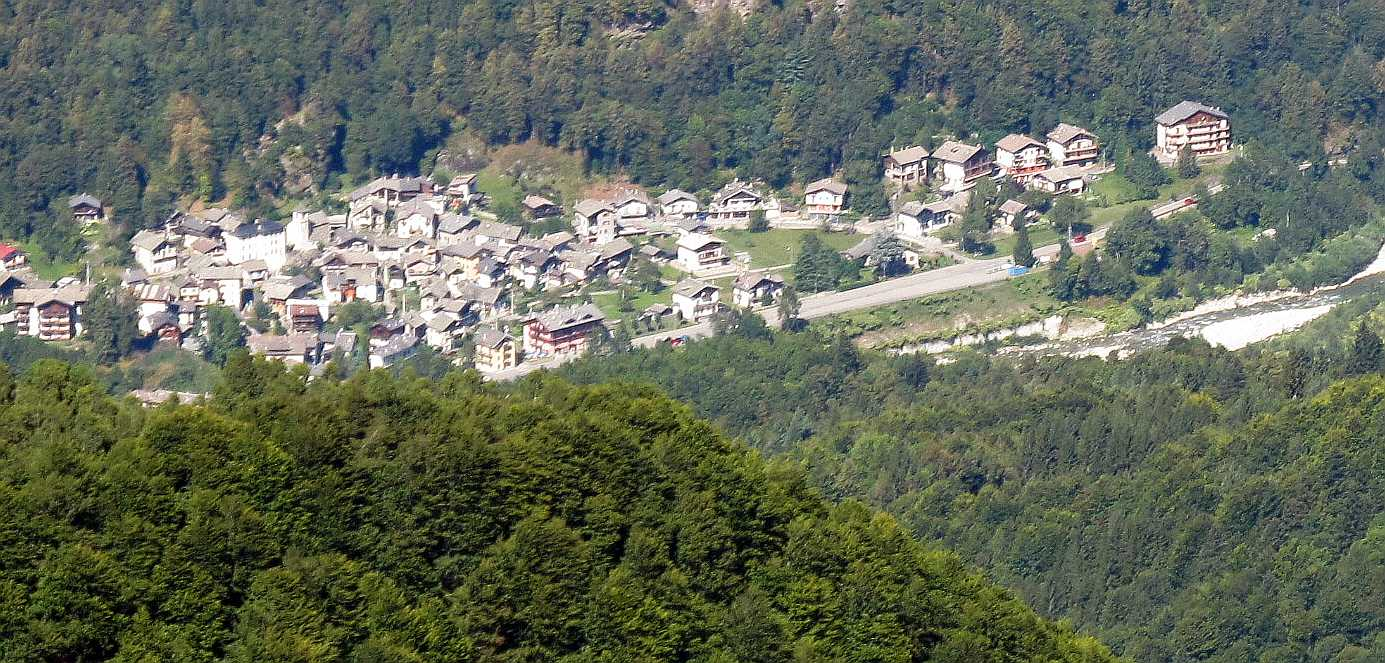
- Pila from a nearby hillside

- Location within Italy Location within Piedmont
- Coordinates: 45°46′N 8°5′E
- Country: Italy
- Region: Piedmont
- Province: Province of Vercelli (VC)

Government
  - Mayor: Enrico Cottura

Area
  - Total: 8.7 km^{2} (3.4 sq mi)

Population (Dec. 2004)
  - Total: 118
  - Density: 14/km^{2} (35/sq mi)
- Time zone: UTC+1 (CET)
  - Summer (DST): UTC+2 (CEST)
- Postal code: 13020
- Dialing code: 0163

Pila is a comune (municipality) in the Province of Vercelli in the Italian region Piedmont, located about 80 kilometres (50 mi) northeast of Turin and about 60 kilometres (37 mi) northwest of Vercelli. As of 31 December 2004, it had a population of 118 and an area of 8.7 square kilometres (3.4 mi^{2}).

Pila borders the following municipalities: Pettinengo, Piode, and Scopello.

== Demographic evolution ==
Historical population

Year	Pop.	±%
1861	433	—
1871	380	−12.2%
1881	407	+7.1%
1901	348	−14.5%
1911	356	+2.3%

Year	Pop.	±%
1921	324	−9.0%
1931	272	−16.0%
1936	237	−12.9%
1951	216	−8.9%
1961	168	−22.2%

Year	Pop.	±%
1971	129	−23.2%
1981	139	+7.8%
1991	114	−18.0%
2001	114	+0.0%

Source: Data from ISTAT
