= FIS Freestyle World Ski Championships 1986 =

The 1986 FIS Freestyle World Ski Championships were held between February 2 and February 6 at the Tignes ski resort in France. The World Championships were the first to be held in the freestyle skiing discipline and featured both men's and women's events in the Moguls, Aerials, Acro Skiing and the Combined.

== Results ==
=== Men's results ===
==== Moguls ====
Medal	Name	Nation
1st place, gold medalist(s)	Eric Berthon	France
2nd place, silver medalist(s)	Petsch Moser	Switzerland
3rd place, bronze medalist(s)	Martti Kellokumpu	Finland

==== Aerials ====
Medal	Name	Nation
1st place, gold medalist(s)	Lloyd Langlois	Canada
2nd place, silver medalist(s)	Yves Laroche	Canada
3rd place, bronze medalist(s)	Jean-Marc Bacquin	France

==== Acro Skiing ====
Medal	Name	Nation
1st place, gold medalist(s)	Richard Schabl	Germany
2nd place, silver medalist(s)	Lane Spina	United States
3rd place, bronze medalist(s)	Georg Fürmeier	Germany

==== Combined ====
Medal	Name	Nation	Result
1st place, gold medalist(s)	Alain Laroche	Canada	33.00
2nd place, silver medalist(s)	John Witt	United States	43.00
3rd place, bronze medalist(s)	Eric Laboureix	France	57.00

=== Women's results ===
==== Moguls ====
Medal	Name	Nation
1st place, gold medalist(s)	Mary Jo Tiampo	United States
2nd place, silver medalist(s)	Hayley Wolff	United States
3rd place, bronze medalist(s)	Silvia Marciandi	Italy

==== Aerials ====
Medal	Name	Nation
1st place, gold medalist(s)	Maria Quintana	United States
2nd place, silver medalist(s)	Carin Hernskog	Sweden
3rd place, bronze medalist(s)	Meredith Anne Gardner	Canada

==== Acro Skiing ====
Medal	Name	Nation
1st place, gold medalist(s)	Jan Bucher	United States
2nd place, silver medalist(s)	Christine Rossi	France
3rd place, bronze medalist(s)	Lucie Barma	Canada

==== Combined ====
Medal	Name	Nation	Result
1st place, gold medalist(s)	Conny Kissling	Switzerland	18.00
2nd place, silver medalist(s)	Anna Fraser	Canada	32.00
3rd place, bronze medalist(s)	Silvia Marciandi	Italy	38.00

== Medal table ==
Rank	Nation	Gold	Silver	Bronze	Total
1	United States	3	3	0	6
2	Canada	2	2	2	6
3	France	1	1	2	4
4	Switzerland	1	1	0	2
5	Germany	1	0	1	2
6	Sweden	0	1	0	1
7	Italy	0	0	2	2
8	Finland	0	0	1	1
Totals (8 entries)		8	8	8	24
