= Carin Hernskog =

Swedish freestyle skier

Personal information
- Nationality: Swedish
- Born: 1963 (age 62–63)

Sport
- Country: Sweden
- Sport: Freestyle skiing
Medal record
Women's freestyle skiing
Representing Sweden
World Championships
Silver medal – second place	1986 Tignes	Aerials

Carin Hernskog (born 1963) is a Swedish freestyle skier.

She won a silver medal in aerials at the FIS Freestyle World Ski Championships 1986 in Tignes.

She took part in the 1988 Winter Olympics in Calgary, placing third in aerials, which was a demonstration event at the games.
