= Ravascletto =

Ravascletto Monai/Ravasclêt (Friulian)
- Comune
- Comune di Ravascletto
- Location within Italy Location within Friuli-Venezia Giulia
- Coordinates: 46°32′N 12°55′E
- Country: Italy
- Region: Friuli-Venezia Giulia
- Province: Udine (UD)
- Frazioni: Ravascletto, Zovello, Salârs

Government
  - Mayor: Flavio De Stalis (Floridura di Ravasclêt 3)

Area
  - Total: 26.3 km^{2} (10.2 sq mi)

Population (Dec. 2004)
  - Total: 601
  - Density: 22.9/km^{2} (59.2/sq mi)
- Demonym: moneans (Friulian)
- Time zone: UTC+1 (CET)
  - Summer (DST): UTC+2 (CEST)
- Postal code: 33020
- Dialing code: 0433
- Saint day: Pentecost Monday
- Website: http://www.altofriuli.net/altofriuli/ravascletto/home.nsf

Ravascletto (Friulian: Monai or Ravasclêt) is a comune (municipality) in the Regional decentralization entity of Udine in the Italian region of Friuli-Venezia Giulia, located about 120 kilometres (75 mi) northwest of Trieste and about 60 kilometres (37 mi) northwest of Udine. As of 31 December 2004, it had a population of 601 and an area of 26.3 square kilometres (10.2 mi^{2}).

Ravascletto borders the following municipalities: Cercivento, Comeglians, Ovaro, Paluzza, Sutrio.

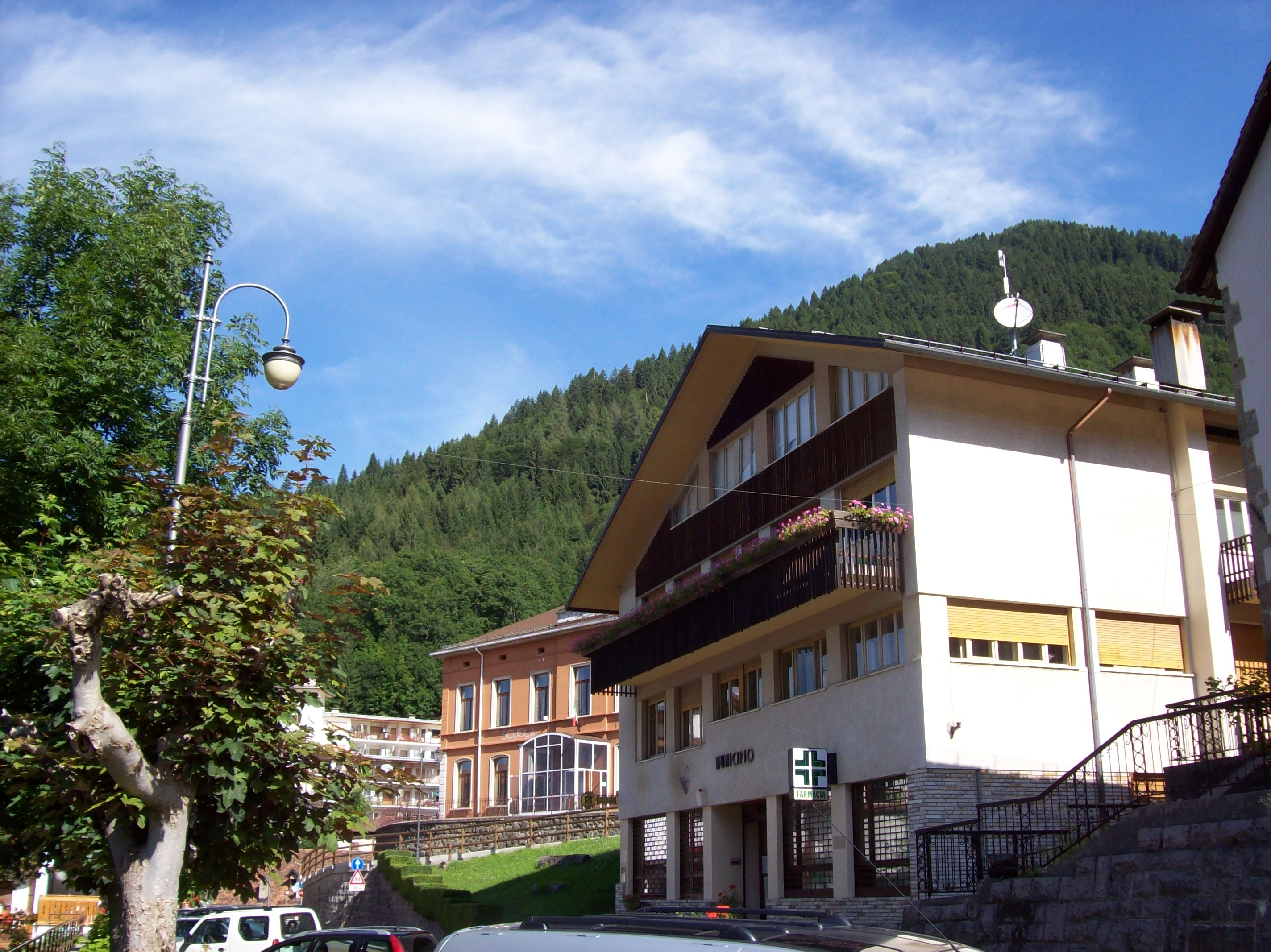
the town hall

== Demographic evolution ==
Historical population

Year	Pop.	±%
1861	?	—
1871	1,184	—
1881	1,250	+5.6%
1901	1,421	+13.7%
1911	1,691	+19.0%

Year	Pop.	±%
1921	1,797	+6.3%
1931	1,680	−6.5%
1936	1,452	−13.6%
1951	1,500	+3.3%
1961	1,332	−11.2%

Year	Pop.	±%
1971	1,028	−22.8%
1981	883	−14.1%
1991	746	−15.5%
2001	642	−13.9%

Source: Data from ISTAT
