= Maria Quintana =

American freestyle skier

Personal information
- Nationality: American
- Born: 1966 (age 59–60)

Sport
- Country: United States
- Sport: Freestyle skiing
Medal record
Women's freestyle skiing
Representing United States
World Championships
Gold medal – first place	1986 Tignes	Aerials

Maria Quintana (born 1966) is an American freestyle skier and world champion.

She won a gold medal in aerials at the FIS Freestyle World Ski Championships 1986 in Tignes. At the FIS Freestyle World Ski Championships 1989 in Oberjoch, she placed seventh in aerials.

She took part at the 1988 Winter Olympics in Calgary, where aerials was a demonstration event.
