= Göstling an der Ybbs =

Municipality in Lower Austria, Austria

- Municipality
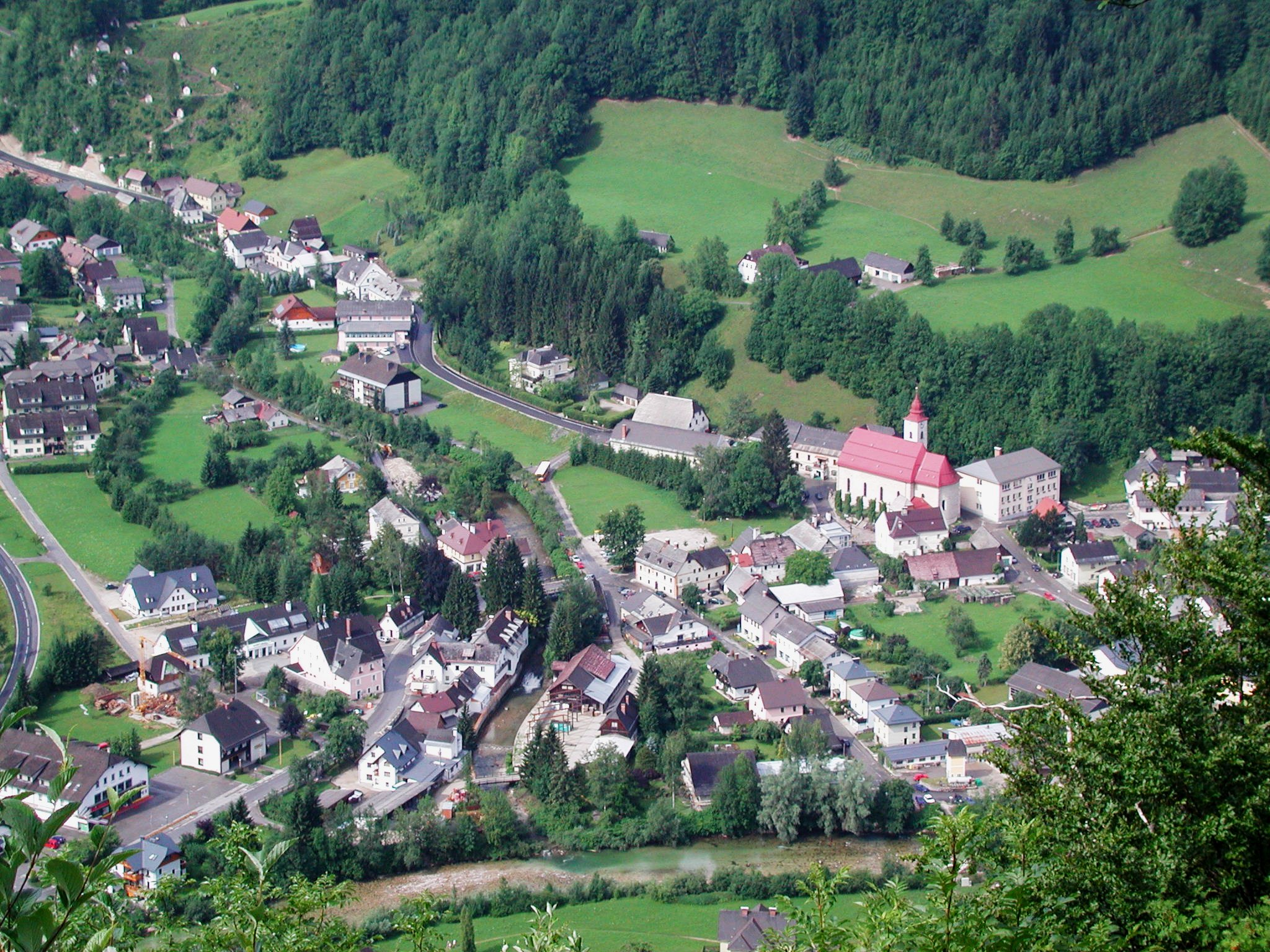
- Göstling in summer

- Coat of arms

- Location within Austria
- Coordinates: 47°49′00″N 14°56′00″E
- Country: Austria
- State: Lower Austria
- District: Scheibbs

Government
  - Mayor: Friedrich Fahrnberger (ÖVP)

Area
  - Total: 143.73 km^{2} (55.49 sq mi)
- Elevation: 532 m (1,745 ft)

Population (2018-01-01)
  - Total: 2,058
  - Density: 14.32/km^{2} (37.08/sq mi)
- Time zone: UTC+1 (CET)
  - Summer (DST): UTC+2 (CEST)
- Postal code: 3345
- Area code: 07484
- Vehicle registration: SB
- Website: www.goestling.com

Göstling an der Ybbs is a municipality in the district of Scheibbs in the Austrian state of Lower Austria.

== Population ==
Historical population
Year	Pop.	±%
1971	2,159	—
1981	2,198	+1.8%
1991	2,187	−0.5%
2001	2,181	−0.3%

== Twin towns ==
Göstling an der Ybbs is twinned with:

- Hüttenberg, Germany
- Purkersdorf, Austria
