= Sälen =

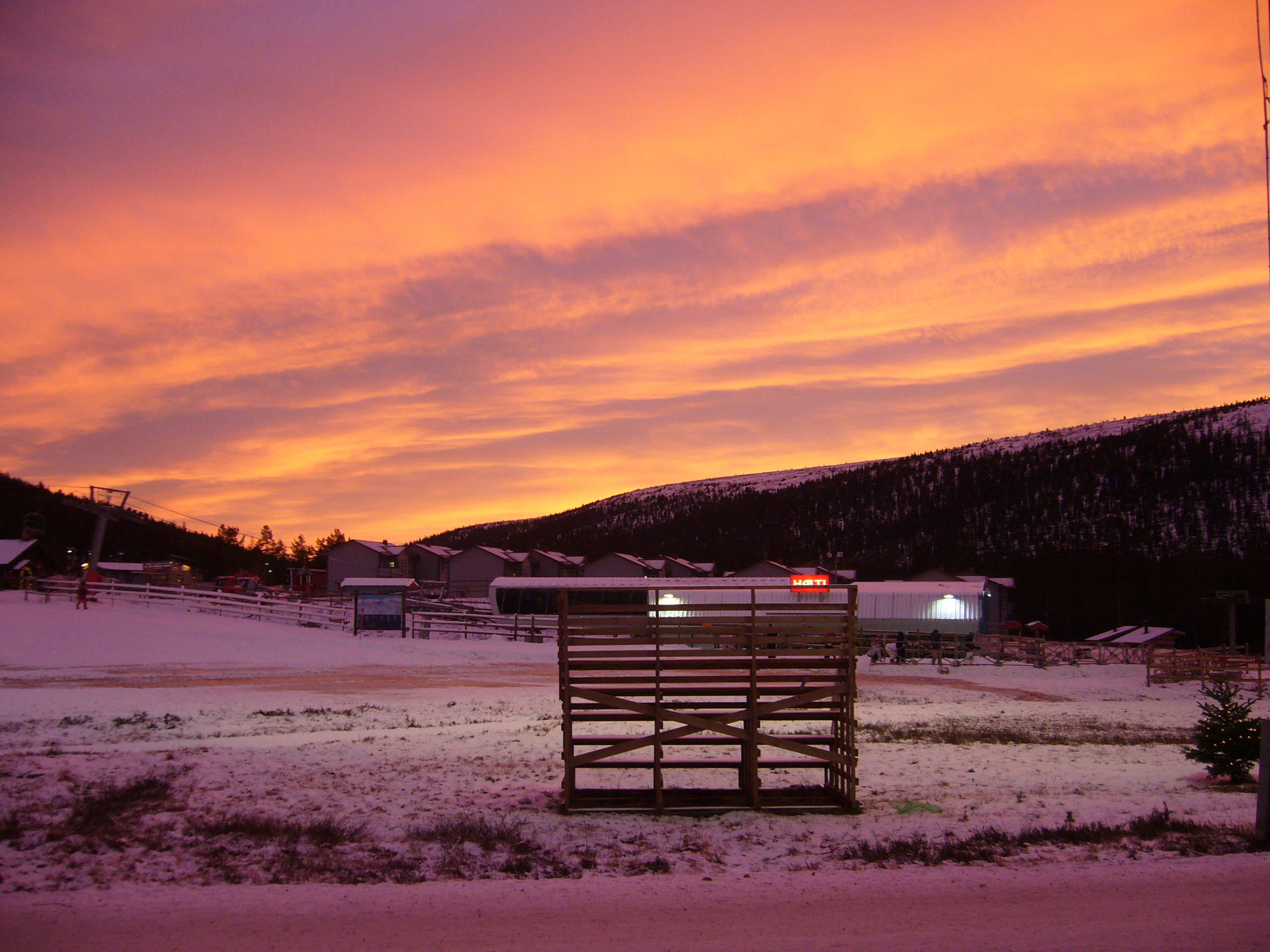
- Sunset and snow in Sälen

- Location within Dalarna Location within Sweden
- Coordinates: 61°09′N 13°16′E
- Country: Sweden
- Province: Dalarna
- County: Dalarna County
- Municipality: Malung-Sälen Municipality

Area
  - Total: 1.33 km^{2} (0.51 sq mi)

Population (31 December 2010)
  - Total: 652
  - Density: 491/km^{2} (1,270/sq mi)
- Time zone: UTC+1 (CET)
  - Summer (DST): UTC+2 (CEST)

Sälen (Swedish: [sæːlen]) is a locality situated in Malung-Sälen Municipality, Dalarna County, Sweden with 652 inhabitants in 2010.

Despite its small population, Sälen receives many tourists every winter. Sälen is best known for hosting the start of Vasaloppet, the oldest (since 1922) and largest cross country ski race in the world, with over 15,000 participants in the main race alone. It is also known for its many alpine ski resorts, of which there are seven. The oldest resort in Sälen is Högfjällshotellet which was built in 1937 and remains popular for recreation, cross-country skiing and downhill skiing. Newer resorts with steeper mountains are Hundfjället and Stöten. Other resorts are Lindvallen, Näsfjället, Tandådalen, and Kläppen. Today Lindvallen, Högfjället, Tandådalen and Hundfjället are operated by the Skistar company. Lindvallen and Högfjället are connected with ski lifts, as is Tandådalen with Hundfjället The vertical height is up to 350 m.

== Transport ==
The nearest airport is Scandinavian Mountains Airport, which opened in December 2019. Mora Airport is 100 kilometers away (regular bus connections from Mora). The nearest international airport is Oslo Airport, 220 kilometers away.

== In the media ==
Popular rock band U2's music video for the song "New Year's Day" was filmed in Sälen on December 15, 1982.

== Climate ==
Sälen has a subarctic climate (Dfc).

Climate data for Sälen-Högfjället V 1991-2020 (751m)
Month	Jan	Feb	Mar	Apr	May	Jun	Jul	Aug	Sep	Oct	Nov	Dec	Year
Mean daily maximum °C (°F)	−3.7 (25.3)	−3.5 (25.7)	−0.6 (30.9)	4.3 (39.7)	10.3 (50.5)	14.6 (58.3)	17.2 (63.0)	15.4 (59.7)	10.4 (50.7)	4.1 (39.4)	−0.5 (31.1)	−2.8 (27.0)	5.4 (41.8)
Daily mean °C (°F)	−6.1 (21.0)	−6.0 (21.2)	−3.4 (25.9)	0.9 (33.6)	6.1 (43.0)	10.4 (50.7)	13.2 (55.8)	11.5 (52.7)	7.1 (44.8)	1.7 (35.1)	−2.5 (27.5)	−5.1 (22.8)	2.3 (36.2)
Mean daily minimum °C (°F)	−8.2 (17.2)	−8.6 (16.5)	−6.3 (20.7)	−2.3 (27.9)	2.0 (35.6)	6.2 (43.2)	9.2 (48.6)	8.3 (46.9)	4.6 (40.3)	−0.2 (31.6)	−4.3 (24.3)	−8.2 (17.2)	−0.6 (30.8)
Source: NOAA

Climate data for Tandådalen Aut 1991-2020 (830m)
Month	Jan	Feb	Mar	Apr	May	Jun	Jul	Aug	Sep	Oct	Nov	Dec	Year
Mean daily maximum °C (°F)	−4.8 (23.4)	−4.5 (23.9)	−1.4 (29.5)	3.5 (38.3)	9.6 (49.3)	14.0 (57.2)	16.6 (61.9)	14.8 (58.6)	9.7 (49.5)	3.2 (37.8)	−1.5 (29.3)	−3.9 (25.0)	4.6 (40.3)
Daily mean °C (°F)	−6.6 (20.1)	−6.5 (20.3)	−4.1 (24.6)	0.1 (32.2)	5.4 (41.7)	9.9 (49.8)	12.9 (55.2)	11.0 (51.8)	6.4 (43.5)	0.8 (33.4)	−2.9 (26.8)	−5.6 (21.9)	1.7 (35.1)
Mean daily minimum °C (°F)	−8.9 (16.0)	−9.3 (15.3)	−7.1 (19.2)	−3.1 (26.4)	1.2 (34.2)	5.7 (42.3)	8.9 (48.0)	7.9 (46.2)	3.9 (39.0)	−0.9 (30.4)	−4.9 (23.2)	−7.8 (18.0)	−1.2 (29.9)
Source: NOAA

== See also ==
- Tourism in Sweden
- List of ski areas and resorts in Europe
