= Lucie Barma =

Canadian freestyle skier

Personal information
- Nationality: Canadian

Sport
- Country: Canada
- Sport: Freestyle skiing
Medal record
Women's freestyle skiing
Representing Canada
World Championships
Bronze medal – third place	1986 Tignes	Ski ballet
Bronze medal – third place	1989 Oberjoch	Ski ballet

Lucie Barma is a Canadian freestyle skier.

She won a bronze medal in ski ballet at the FIS Freestyle World Ski Championships 1986 in Tignes, and another bronze medal in ski ballet at the FIS Freestyle World Ski Championships 1989 in Oberjoch.

She took part in the 1988 Winter Olympics in Calgary, where ski ballet was a demonstration event. Barma had 26 podium finishes including one gold medal at World Cup events over her career.
