= Anna Fraser =

Canadian freestyle skier

Personal information
- Nationality: Canadian
- Born: July 25, 1963 (age 62) Vancouver

Sport
- Country: Canada
- Sport: Freestyle skiing
Medal record
Women's freestyle skiing
Representing Canada
World Championships
Silver medal – second place	1986 Tignes	Combined

Anna Rose Fraser-Sproule (born July 25, 1963) is a Canadian freestyle skier.

She competed at the FIS Freestyle World Ski Championships 1986 in Tignes, where she won a silver medal in combined, and placed fourth in aerials, sixth in ski ballet, and 22nd in moguls.

She took part in aerials at the 1988 Winter Olympics in Calgary, where freestyle skiing was a demonstration sport.
