= Alain LaRoche =

Canadian freestyle skier

Personal information
- Nationality: Canada
- Born: 20 September 1963 (age 62)

Sport
- Sport: Skiing

World Cup career
- Seasons: 8
- Indiv. starts: 199
- Indiv. podiums: 53
- Indiv. wins: 21
- Discipline titles: 1
Medal record
Freestyle skiing
World Ski Championships
Gold medal – first place	1986 Tignes	Combined

Alain LaRoche (born 2 September 1963) is a retired Canadian freestyle skier who competed from 1982 to 1990. LaRoche competed in aerials, moguls, ski ballet, and combined. At the inaugural Freestyle World Ski Championships in 1986 at Tignes, France, LaRoche took gold in the combined event. Across eight World Cup seasons, LaRoche amassed 21 first-place finishes, a mark that was eclipsed by Mikael Kingsbury in 2015.

With his brothers Yves, and Philippe, LaRoche along with Lloyd Langlois, Jean-Marc Rozon, and Nicolas Fontaine were a group of Quebec freestylers who excelled in the sport and collectively were known as the Quebec Air Force. Another brother, Dominique also competed in freestyle, and sister Lucie was an alpine ski racer.

LaRoche has been inducted into Canadian Olympic Hall of Fame (1987), and the Canadian Ski Hall of Fame (1999).
