= Silvia Marciandi =

Italian freestyle skier

Personal information
- Nationality: Italian
- Born: 13 May 1963 (age 63) Aosta, Italy

Sport
- Country: Italy
- Sport: Freestyle skiing
Medal record
Women's freestyle skiing
Representing Italy
World Championships
Bronze medal – third place	1986 Tignes	Moguls
Bronze medal – third place	1986 Tignes	Combined

Silvia Marciandi (born 13 May 1963) is an Italian freestyle skier. She was born in Aosta. She competed in the 1992 Winter Olympics in Albertville, and at the 1994 Winter Olympics in Lillehammer, in women's moguls.
