= Jan Bucher =

American freestyle skier

Personal information
- Nationality: American
- Born: 1957 (age 68–69)

Sport
- Country: United States
- Sport: Freestyle skiing
Medal record
Women's freestyle skiing
Representing United States
World Championships
Gold medal – first place	1986 Tignes	Ski ballet
Gold medal – first place	1989 Oberjoch	Ski ballet
Silver medal – second place	1991 Lake Placid	Ski ballet

Jan Bucher (born 1957) is an American freestyle skier and world champion.

She won a gold medal in acroski (ski ballet) at the FIS Freestyle World Ski Championships 1986 in Tignes. At the FIS Freestyle World Ski Championships 1989 in Oberjoch, she won a second gold medal in ski ballet. She won a silver medal in ski ballet at the FIS Freestyle World Ski Championships 1991 in Lake Placid.

She took part at the 1988 Winter Olympics in Calgary, where ski ballet was a demonstration event.
