= Hayley Wolff =

American freestyle skier (born 1964)

Personal information
- Nationality: American
- Born: 1964 (age 61–62)

Sport
- Country: United States
- Sport: Freestyle skiing
Medal record
Women's freestyle skiing
Representing United States
World Championships
Gold medal – first place	1983 Breckenridge	Moguls
Silver medal – second place	1986 Tignes	Moguls

Hayley Wolff (born 1964) is an American freestyle skier.

She won a gold medal in moguls at the FIS Freestyle World Ski Championships 1983 in Breckenridge and she won a silver medal in moguls at the FIS Freestyle World Ski Championships 1986 in Tignes.
