= Christine Rossi =

French freestyle skier

Personal information
- Nationality: French
- Born: 1 May 1963 (age 63)

Sport
- Country: France
- Sport: Freestyle skiing
Medal record
Women's freestyle skiing
Representing France
World Championships
Silver medal – second place	1986 Tignes	Ski ballet

Christine Rossi (born 1 May 1963) is a French freestyle skier.

She competed at the FIS Freestyle World Ski Championships 1986 in Tignes, where she won a silver medal in acroski (ski ballet).

She took part at the 1988 Winter Olympics in Calgary, winning the ski ballet, which was a demonstration event at the games.
