= Oberjoch =

- Ortsteil of Bad Hindelang
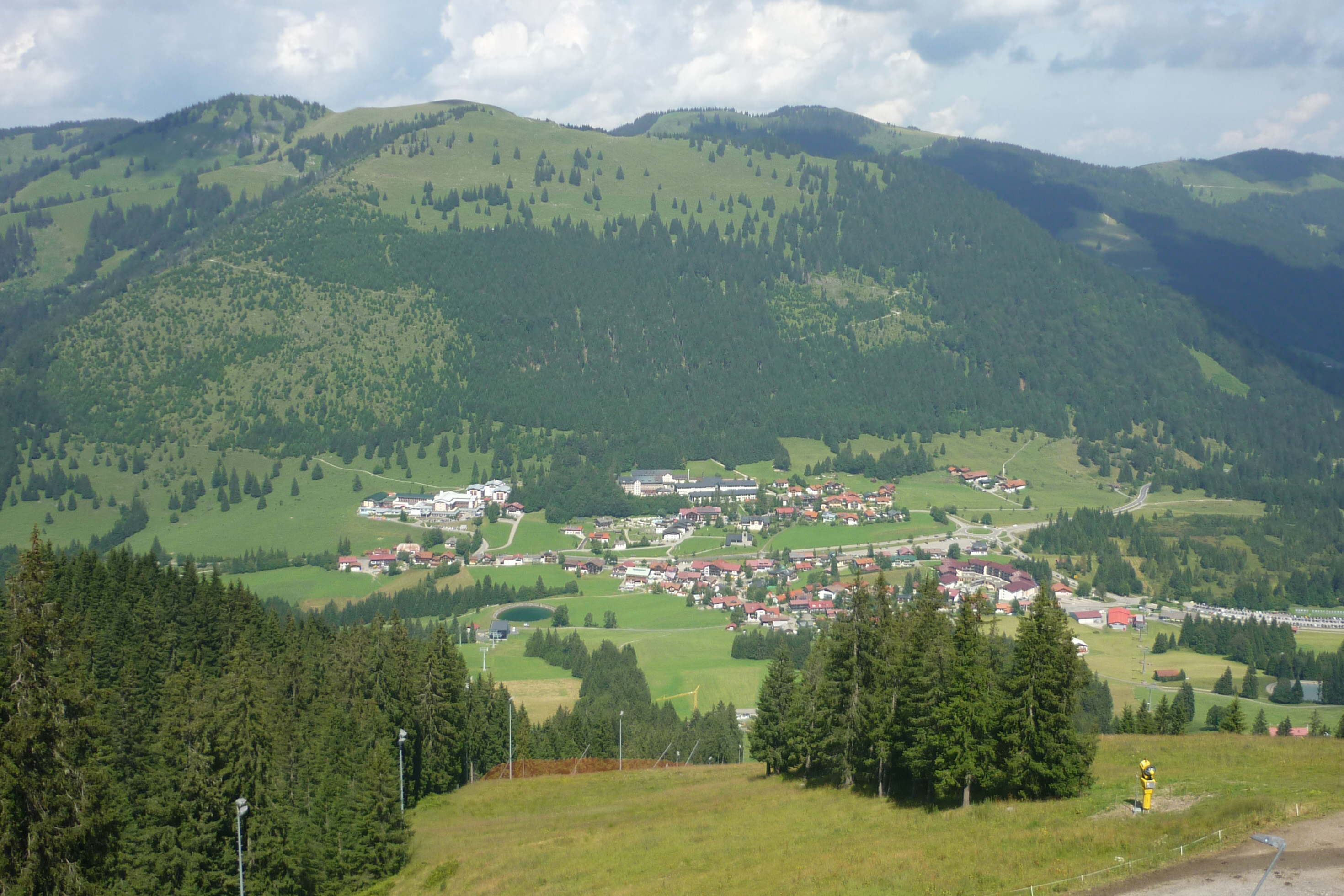
- Interactive map of Oberjoch
- Location within Germany Location within Bavaria
- Coordinates: 47°30′54″N 10°24′21″E
- Country: Germany
- State: Bavaria
- Admin. region: Swabia
- District: Oberallgäu
- Municipality: Bad Hindelang
- Elevation: 1,136–1,200 m (3,727–3,937 ft)

Population
  - Total: 200
- Time zone: UTC+01:00 (CET)
  - Summer (DST): UTC+02:00 (CEST)
- Postal codes: 87541
- Dialling codes: 08324
- Vehicle registration: OA
- Website: www.oberjoch.info

Oberjoch (German pronunciation: [ˈoːbɐˌjɔx]) is a small village in the municipality of Bad Hindelang in the German district of Oberallgäu, Bavaria. It has a total population of 15,230 people. The village is advertised as being the highest located ski resort in Germany, but several settlements are located higher (Feldberg, Winklmoos-Alm, Gerstruben). It is popular for skiing in winter, and in summer, many hikers and mountaineers visit Oberjoch.
