= 1993–94 FIS Freestyle Ski World Cup =

Freestyle skiing competitive season

Freestyle Skiing World Cup 1993/94
| Discipline | Men | Women |
| Overall | (Russia) Sergey Shupletsov | (United States) Kristean Porter |
| Moguls | (France) Edgar Grospiron | (United States) Donna Weinbrecht |
| Aerials | (Canada) Philippe LaRoche | (Uzbekistan) Lina Cheryazova |
| Ballet | (France) Fabrice Becker | (United States) Ellen Breen |
| Combined | (Canada) David Belhumeur | (Switzerland) Maja Schmid |

Competition
| Locations | 12 | 12 |
| Individual | 41 | 42 |

The 1993/94 FIS Freestyle Skiing World Cup was the fifteenth World Cup season in freestyle skiing organised by International Ski Federation. The season started on 10 December 1993 and ended on 13 March 1994. This season included four disciplines: aerials, moguls, ballet and combined.

== Men ==
=== Moguls ===
| Num | Season | Date | Place | Event | Winner | Second | Third |
|---|---|---|---|---|---|---|---|
| 129 | 1 | 11 December 1993 | (France) Tignes | MO | (France) Thony Hemery | (France) Olivier Cotte | (France) Edgar Grospiron |
| 130 | 2 | 21 December 1993 | (France) La Plagne | MO | (Canada) Pierre Forget | (France) Olivier Cotte | (France) Bruno Bertrand |
| 131 | 3 | 8 January 1994 | (Canada) Blackcomb | MO | (Russia) Sergey Shupletsov | (Canada) Jean-Luc Brassard | (Canada) Marc McDonell |
| 132 | 4 | 15 January 1994 | (United States) Breckenridge | MO | (France) Edgar Grospiron | (Russia) Sergey Shupletsov | (United States) Sean Smith |
| 133 | 5 | 21 January 1994 | (United States) Lake Placid | MO | (France) Edgar Grospiron | (Canada) Jean-Luc Brassard | (Sweden) Jörgen Pääjärvi |
| 134 | 6 | 29 January 1994 | (Canada) Le Relais | MO | (Canada) Jean-Luc Brassard | (France) Olivier Allamand | (France) Edgar Grospiron |
| 135 | 7 | 3 February 1994 | (France) La Clusaz | MO | (France) Edgar Grospiron | (Canada) Jean-Luc Brassard | (France) Thony Hemery |
| 136 | 8 | 8 February 1994 | (Sweden) Hundfjället | MO | (France) Edgar Grospiron | (France) Olivier Cotte | (Russia) Sergey Shupletsov |
| 137 | 9 | 4 March 1994 | (Austria) Altenmarkt-Zauchensee | MO | (Canada) Jean-Luc Brassard | (Russia) Sergey Shupletsov | (France) Edgar Grospiron |
| 138 | 10 | 6 March 1994 | (Austria) Kirchberg | MO | (France) Edgar Grospiron | (Russia) Sergey Shupletsov | (United States) Troy Benson |
| 139 | 11 | 12 March 1994 | (Switzerland) Meiringen-Hasliberg | MO | (Russia) Sergey Shupletsov | (France) Edgar Grospiron | (United States) Troy Benson |

=== Aerials ===
| Num | Season | Date | Place | Event | Winner | Second | Third |
|---|---|---|---|---|---|---|---|
| 125 | 1 | 12 December 1993 | (France) Tignes | AE | (United States) Trace Worthington | (Switzerland) Andreas Schönbächler | (Austria) Christian Rijavec |
| 126 | 2 | 16 December 1993 | (Italy) Piancavallo | AE | (Canada) Nicolas Fontaine | (Austria) Christian Rijavec | (United States) Eric Bergoust |
| 127 | 3 | 9 January 1994 | (Canada) Blackcomb | AE | (Canada) Nicolas Fontaine | (Austria) Christian Rijavec | (Canada) Philippe LaRoche |
| 128 | 4 | 16 January 1994 | (United States) Breckenridge | AE | (Canada) Philippe LaRoche | (Canada) Lloyd Langlois | (Switzerland) Andreas Schönbächler |
| 129 | 5 | 22 January 1994 | (United States) Lake Placid | AE | (France) Jean-Marc Bacquin | (Canada) Lloyd Langlois | (United States) Trace Worthington |
| 130 | 6 | 23 January 1994 | (United States) Lake Placid | AE | (France) Sébastien Foucras | (Sweden) Mats Johansson | (United States) Kip Griffin |
| 131 | 7 | 30 January 1994 | (Canada) Le Relais | AE | (Canada) Philippe LaRoche | (United States) Ray Fuerst | (United States) Kris Feddersen |
| 132 | 8 | 4 February 1994 | (France) La Clusaz | AE | (Canada) Lloyd Langlois | (Switzerland) Andreas Schönbächler | (Canada) Philippe LaRoche |
| 133 | 9 | 9 February 1994 | (Sweden) Hundfjället | AE | (Canada) Philippe LaRoche | (Canada) Nicolas Fontaine | (France) Sébastien Foucras |
| 134 | 10 | 5 March 1994 | (Austria) Altenmarkt-Zauchensee | AE | (United States) Kris Feddersen | (United States) Trace Worthington | (Canada) Andy Capicik |
| 135 | 11 | 13 March 1994 | (Switzerland) Meiringen-Hasliberg | AE | (United States) Eric Bergoust | (Canada) Lloyd Langlois | (Canada) Andy Capicik |

=== Ballet ===
| Num | Season | Date | Place | Event | Winner | Second | Third |
|---|---|---|---|---|---|---|---|
| 128 | 1 | 10 December 1993 | (France) Tignes | AC | (France) Fabrice Becker | (Switzerland) Heini Baumgartner | (Italy) Roberto Franco |
| 129 | 2 | 14 December 1993 | (Italy) Piancavallo | AC | (France) Fabrice Becker | (Norway) Rune Kristiansen | (Switzerland) Heini Baumgartner |
| 130 | 3 | 20 December 1993 | (France) La Plagne | AC | (Switzerland) Heini Baumgartner | (France) Fabrice Becker | (United States) Steven Roxberg |
| 131 | 4 | 7 January 1994 | (Canada) Blackcomb | AC | (France) Fabrice Becker | (Switzerland) Heini Baumgartner | (United States) Ian Edmondson |
| 132 | 5 | 14 January 1994 | (United States) Breckenridge | AC | (Switzerland) Heini Baumgartner | (United States) Ian Edmondson | (France) Fabrice Becker |
| 133 | 6 | 20 January 1994 | (United States) Lake Placid | AC | (Norway) Rune Kristiansen | (France) Fabrice Becker | (Switzerland) Heini Baumgartner |
| 134 | 7 | 28 January 1994 | (Canada) Le Relais | AC | (France) Fabrice Becker | (Norway) Rune Kristiansen | (United States) Ian Edmondson |
| 135 | 8 | 2 February 1994 | (France) La Clusaz | AC | (Switzerland) Heini Baumgartner | (France) Fabrice Becker | (Germany) Armin Weiss |
| 136 | 9 | 7 February 1994 | (Sweden) Hundfjället | AC | (Norway) Rune Kristiansen | (France) Fabrice Becker | (Switzerland) Heini Baumgartner |
| 137 | 10 | 3 March 1994 | (Austria) Altenmarkt-Zauchensee | AC | (France) Fabrice Becker | (Norway) Rune Kristiansen | (Switzerland) Heini Baumgartner |
| 138 | 11 | 11 March 1994 | (Switzerland) Meiringen-Hasliberg | AC | (Norway) Rune Kristiansen | (France) Fabrice Becker | (Switzerland) Heini Baumgartner |

=== Combined ===
| Num | Season | Date | Place | Event | Winner | Second | Third |
|---|---|---|---|---|---|---|---|
| 119 | 1 | 12 December 1993 | (France) Tignes | CO | (United States) Trace Worthington | (Russia) Sergey Shupletsov | (United States) Jonny Moseley |
| 120 | 2 | 9 January 1994 | (Canada) Blackcomb | CO | (Canada) David Belhumeur | (Russia) Sergey Shupletsov | (United States) Rick Moseley |
| 121 | 3 | 16 January 1994 | (United States) Breckenridge | CO | (Canada) Darcy Downs | (Russia) Sergey Shupletsov | (Canada) David Belhumeur |
| 122 | 4 | 23 January 1994 | (United States) Lake Placid | CO | (Canada) Darcy Downs | (Canada) David Belhumeur | (Russia) Sergey Shupletsov |
| 123 | 5 | 30 January 1994 | (Canada) Le Relais | CO | (Canada) David Belhumeur | (United States) Jonny Moseley | (United States) Rick Moseley |
| 124 | 6 | 4 February 1994 | (France) La Clusaz | CO | (Canada) Darcy Downs | (Canada) David Belhumeur | (United States) Rick Moseley |
| 125 | 7 | 9 February 1994 | (Sweden) Hundfjället | CO | (Canada) David Belhumeur | (Russia) Sergey Shupletsov | (Canada) Darcy Downs |
| 126 | 8 | 5 March 1994 | (Austria) Altenmarkt-Zauchensee | CO | (United States) Trace Worthington | (Russia) Sergey Shupletsov | (Canada) David Belhumeur |
| 127 | 9 | 13 March 1994 | (Switzerland) Meiringen-Hasliberg | CO | (Russia) Sergey Shupletsov | (Canada) David Belhumeur | (United States) Jonny Moseley |

== Ladies ==
=== Moguls ===
| Num | Season | Date | Place | Event | Winner | Second | Third |
|---|---|---|---|---|---|---|---|
| 129 | 1 | 11 December 1993 | (France) Tignes | MO | (United States) Donna Weinbrecht | (France) Candice Gilg | (Italy) Silvia Marciandi |
| 130 | 2 | 21 December 1993 | (France) La Plagne | MO | (United States) Donna Weinbrecht | (Italy) Silvia Marciandi | (Norway) Stine Lise Hattestad |
| 131 | 3 | 8 January 1994 | (Canada) Blackcomb | MO | (United States) Donna Weinbrecht | (Germany) Tatjana Mittermayer | (United States) Anne Dowling |
| 132 | 4 | 15 January 1994 | (United States) Breckenridge | MO | (United States) Donna Weinbrecht | (Germany) Tatjana Mittermayer | (United States) Liz McIntyre |
| 133 | 5 | 21 January 1994 | (United States) Lake Placid | MO | (United States) Donna Weinbrecht | (Norway) Stine Lise Hattestad | (United States) Liz McIntyre |
| 134 | 6 | 29 January 1994 | (Canada) Le Relais | MO | (United States) Donna Weinbrecht | (France) Candice Gilg | (Norway) Stine Lise Hattestad |
| 135 | 7 | 3 February 1994 | (France) La Clusaz | MO | (France) Candice Gilg | (France) Raphaëlle Monod | (Italy) Petra Moroder |
| 136 | 8 | 8 February 1994 | (Sweden) Hundfjället | MO | (Norway) Stine Lise Hattestad | (United States) Donna Weinbrecht | (France) Raphaëlle Monod |
| 137 | 9 | 4 March 1994 | (Austria) Altenmarkt-Zauchensee | MO | (Russia) Ljudmila Dymchenko | (Norway) Stine Lise Hattestad | (United States) Donna Weinbrecht |
| 138 | 10 | 6 March 1994 | (Austria) Kirchberg | MO | (United States) Donna Weinbrecht | (Norway) Stine Lise Hattestad | (France) Candice Gilg |
| 139 | 11 | 12 March 1994 | (Switzerland) Meiringen-Hasliberg | MO | (United States) Donna Weinbrecht | (Norway) Stine Lise Hattestad | (France) Candice Gilg |

=== Aerials ===
| Num | Season | Date | Place | Event | Winner | Second | Third |
|---|---|---|---|---|---|---|---|
| 128 | 1 | 12 December 1993 | (France) Tignes | AE | (Uzbekistan) Lina Cheryazova | (Germany) Sonja Reichart | (Canada) Caroline Olivier |
| 129 | 2 | 16 December 1993 | (Italy) Piancavallo | AE | (Switzerland) Colette Brand | (Uzbekistan) Lina Cheryazova | (United States) Kristean Porter |
| 130 | 3 | 22 December 1993 | (France) La Plagne | AE | (Switzerland) Colette Brand | (Uzbekistan) Lina Cheryazova | (United States) Stacey Blumer |
| 131 | 4 | 9 January 1994 | (Canada) Blackcomb | AE | (Germany) Elfie Simchen | (United States) Nikki Stone | (Sweden) Marie Lindgren |
| 132 | 5 | 16 January 1994 | (United States) Breckenridge | AE | (Uzbekistan) Lina Cheryazova | (Switzerland) Colette Brand | (Russia) Natalia Orekhova |
| 133 | 6 | 22 January 1994 | (United States) Lake Placid | AE | (Uzbekistan) Lina Cheryazova | (United States) Nikki Stone | (Sweden) Marie Lindgren |
| 134 | 7 | 30 January 1994 | (Canada) Le Relais | AE | (Uzbekistan) Lina Cheryazova | (Russia) Natalia Orekhova | (United States) Nikki Stone |
| 135 | 8 | 4 February 1994 | (France) La Clusaz | AE | (Uzbekistan) Lina Cheryazova | (Australia) Kirstie Marshall | (United Kingdom) Jilly Curry |
| 136 | 9 | 9 February 1994 | (Sweden) Hundfjället | AE | (Uzbekistan) Lina Cheryazova | (Switzerland) Colette Brand | (Sweden) Marie Lindgren |
| 137 | 10 | 5 March 1994 | (Austria) Altenmarkt-Zauchensee | AE | (Sweden) Marie Lindgren | (Canada) Caroline Olivier | (Uzbekistan) Lina Cheryazova |
| 138 | 11 | 13 March 1994 | (Switzerland) Meiringen-Hasliberg | AE | (Switzerland) Colette Brand | (Canada) Caroline Olivier | (Uzbekistan) Lina Cheryazova |

=== Ballet ===
| Num | Season | Date | Place | Event | Winner | Second | Third |
|---|---|---|---|---|---|---|---|
| 129 | 1 | 10 December 1993 | (France) Tignes | AC | (Russia) Oksana Kushenko | (United States) Ellen Breen | (Russia) Natalia Orekhova |
| 130 | 2 | 14 December 1993 | (Italy) Piancavallo | AC | (Russia) Elena Batalova | (United States) Ellen Breen | (Netherlands) Jeannette Witte |
| 131 | 3 | 20 December 1993 | (France) La Plagne | AC | (United States) Ellen Breen | (France) Cathy Fechoz | (Russia) Oksana Kushenko |
| 132 | 4 | 7 January 1994 | (Canada) Blackcomb | AC | (United States) Ellen Breen | (Russia) Oksana Kushenko | (United States) Kristean Porter |
| 133 | 5 | 14 January 1994 | (United States) Breckenridge | AC | (United States) Ellen Breen | (Russia) Oksana Kushenko | (France) Cathy Fechoz |
| 134 | 6 | 20 January 1994 | (United States) Lake Placid | AC | (France) Cathy Fechoz | (Russia) Oksana Kushenko | (United States) Ellen Breen |
| 135 | 7 | 28 January 1994 | (Canada) Le Relais | AC | (United States) Ellen Breen | (Russia) Oksana Kushenko | (France) Cathy Fechoz |
| 136 | 8 | 2 February 1994 | (France) La Clusaz | AC | (United States) Ellen Breen | (Russia) Oksana Kushenko | (Netherlands) Jeannette Witte |
| 137 | 9 | 7 February 1994 | (Sweden) Hundfjället | AC | (United States) Ellen Breen | (France) Cathy Fechoz | (Russia) Oksana Kushenko |
| 138 | 10 | 3 March 1994 | (Austria) Altenmarkt-Zauchensee | AC | (France) Cathy Fechoz | (Russia) Elena Batalova | (United States) Ellen Breen |
| 139 | 11 | 11 March 1994 | (Switzerland) Meiringen-Hasliberg | AC | (France) Cathy Fechoz | (United States) Ellen Breen | (Russia) Elena Batalova |

=== Combined ===
| Num | Season | Date | Place | Event | Winner | Second | Third |
|---|---|---|---|---|---|---|---|
| 121 | 1 | 12 December 1993 | (France) Tignes | CO | (Canada) Katherina Kubenk | (Russia) Natalia Orekhova | (Switzerland) Maja Schmid |
| 122 | 2 | 22 December 1993 | (France) La Plagne | CO | (Canada) Katherina Kubenk | (Russia) Natalia Orekhova | (Switzerland) Maja Schmid |
| 123 | 3 | 9 January 1994 | (Canada) Blackcomb | CO | (Canada) Katherina Kubenk | (Russia) Natalia Orekhova | (Switzerland) Maja Schmid |
| 124 | 4 | 16 January 1994 | (United States) Breckenridge | CO | (Russia) Natalia Orekhova | (Switzerland) Maja Schmid | (Canada) Katherina Kubenk |
| 125 | 5 | 23 January 1994 | (United States) Lake Placid | CO | (Switzerland) Maja Schmid | (Canada) Katherina Kubenk | (Russia) Natalia Orekhova |
| 126 | 6 | 30 January 1994 | (Canada) Le Relais | CO | (Russia) Natalia Orekhova | (Switzerland) Maja Schmid | (Canada) Katherina Kubenk |
| 127 | 7 | 4 February 1994 | (France) La Clusaz | CO | (Switzerland) Maja Schmid | information is not available | information is not available |
| 128 | 8 | 9 February 1994 | (Sweden) Hundfjället | CO | (Canada) Katherina Kubenk | (Switzerland) Maja Schmid | (Russia) Natalia Orekhova |
| 129 | 9 | 5 March 1994 | (Austria) Altenmarkt-Zauchensee | CO | (Switzerland) Maja Schmid | (United States) Kristean Porter | (Russia) Natalia Orekhova |
| 130 | 10 | 13 March 1994 | (Switzerland) Meiringen-Hasliberg | CO | (United States) Kristean Porter | (Switzerland) Maja Schmid | (Russia) Natalia Orekhova |

== Men's standings ==
=== Overall ===
| Rank | | Points |
|---|---|---|
| 1 | (Russia) Sergey Shupletsov | 158 |
| 2 | (Canada) David Belhumeur | 126 |
| 3 | (Canada) Trace Worthington | 116 |
| 4 | (Canada) Darcy Downs | 116 |
| 5 | (France) Fabrice Becker | 98 |

- Standings after 42 races.

=== Moguls ===
| Rank | | Points |
|---|---|---|
| 1 | (France) Edgar Grospiron | 780 |
| 2 | (Russia) Sergey Shupletsov | 748 |
| 3 | (Canada) Jean-Luc Brassard | 744 |
| 4 | (France) Olivier Cotte | 648 |
| 5 | (United States) Sean Smith | 524 |

- Standings after 11 races.

=== Aerials ===
| Rank | | Points |
|---|---|---|
| 1 | (Canada) Philippe LaRoche | 744 |
| 2 | (Canada) Lloyd Langlois | 680 |
| 3 | (Canada) Nicolas Fontaine | 672 |
| 4 | (United States) Trace Worthington | 668 |
| 5 | (Austria) Christian Rijavec | 652 |

- Standings after 11 races.

=== Ballet ===
| Rank | | Points |
|---|---|---|
| 1 | (France) Fabrice Becker | 788 |
| 2 | (Switzerland) Heini Baumgartner | 768 |
| 3 | (Norway) Rune Kristiansen | 760 |
| 4 | (United States) Ian Edmondson | 712 |
| 5 | (Germany) Armin Weiss | 664 |

- Standings after 11 races.

=== Combined ===
| Rank | | Points |
|---|---|---|
| 1 | (Canada) David Belhumeur | 588 |
| 2 | (Russia) Sergey Shupletsov | 580 |
| 3 | (Canada) Darcy Downs | 568 |
| 4 | (United States) Rick Moseley | 540 |
| 5 | (United States) Jonny Moseley | 540 |

- Standings after 9 races.

== Ladies' standings ==
=== Overall ===
| Rank | | Points |
|---|---|---|
| 1 | (United States) Kristean Porter | 156 |
| 2 | (Russia) Natalia Orekhova | 154 |
| 3 | (Canada) Katherina Kubenk | 140 |
| 4 | (Switzerland) Maja Schmid | 136 |
| 5 | (United States) Donna Weinbrecht | 100 |

- Standings after 43 races.

=== Moguls ===
| Rank | | Points |
|---|---|---|
| 1 | (United States) Donna Weinbrecht | 800 |
| 2 | (Norway) Stine Lise Hattestad | 756 |
| 3 | (France) Candice Gilg | 704 |
| 4 | (Germany) Tatjana Mittermayer | 704 |
| 5 | (France) Raphaëlle Monod | 644 |

- Standings after 11 races.

=== Aerials ===
| Rank | | Points |
|---|---|---|
| 1 | (Uzbekistan) Lina Cheryazova | 792 |
| 2 | (Switzerland) Colette Brand | 720 |
| 3 | (United States) Nikki Stone | 688 |
| 4 | (Sweden) Marie Lindgren | 656 |
| 5 | (United States) Kristean Porter | 636 |

- Standings after 11 races.

=== Ballet ===
| Rank | | Points |
|---|---|---|
| 1 | (United States) Ellen Breen | 792 |
| 2 | (Russia) Oksana Kushenko | 764 |
| 2 | (France) Cathy Fechoz | 764 |
| 4 | (Sweden) Annika Johansson | 704 |
| 5 | (Netherlands) Jeannette Witte | 632 |

- Standings after 11 races.

=== Combined ===
| Rank | | Points |
|---|---|---|
| 1 | (Switzerland) Maja Schmid | 684 |
| 2 | (Canada) Katherina Kubenk | 680 |
| 3 | (Russia) Natalia Orekhova | 672 |
| 4 | (Canada) Lisa Hauser | 528 |
| 5 | (United States) Kristean Porter | 196 |

- Standings after 10 races.
