= 1992–93 FIS Freestyle Ski World Cup =

Freestyle skiing competitive season

Freestyle Skiing World Cup 1992/93
Discipline	Men	Women
Overall	(United States) Trace Worthington	(Canada) Katherina Kubenk
Moguls	(Canada) Jean-Luc Brassard	(Norway) Stine Lise Hattestad
Aerials	(Canada) Lloyd Langlois (2)	(Uzbekistan) Lina Cheryazova
Ballet	(Norway) Rune Kristiansen	(United States) Ellen Breen
Combined	(United States) Trace Worthington	(Canada) Katherina Kubenk

Competition
Locations	12	13
Individual	40	40

The 1992/93 FIS Freestyle Skiing World Cup was the fourteenth World Cup season in freestyle skiing organised by International Ski Federation. The season started on 10 December 1992 and ended on 28 March 1993. This season included four disciplines: aerials, moguls, ballet and combined.

== Men ==
=== Moguls ===
Num	Season	Date	Place	Event	Winner	Second	Third
117	1	12 December 1992	(France) Tignes	MO	(Canada) John Smart	(Sweden) Leif Persson	(France) Edgar Grospiron
118	2	19 December 1992	(Italy) Piancavallo	MO	(Canada) Jean-Luc Brassard	(France) Edgar Grospiron	(France) Bruno Bertrand
119	3	9 January 1993	(Canada) Blackcomb	MO	(France) Edgar Grospiron	(Canada) Jean-Luc Brassard	(Canada) Dominick Gauthier
120	4	16 January 1993	(United States) Breckenridge	MO	(United States) Jim Moran	(France) Edgar Grospiron	(Norway) Hans Engelsen Eide
121	5	22 January 1993	(United States) Lake Placid	MO	(Canada) Jean-Luc Brassard	(France) Olivier Cotte	(Canada) John Smart
122	6	30 January 1993	(Canada) Le Relais	MO	(Canada) Jean-Luc Brassard	(Sweden) Jörgen Pääjärvi	(Canada) Stéphane Rochon
123	7	11 February 1993	(France) La Clusaz	MO	(France) Olivier Cotte	(Canada) Jean-Luc Brassard	(France) Fabrice Ougier
124	8	20 February 1993	(Switzerland) Meiringen-Hasliberg	MO	(Canada) Jean-Luc Brassard	(France) Olivier Cotte	(Canada) John Smart
125	9	25 February 1993	(France) La Plagne	MO	(France) Fabien Bertrand	(Canada) John Smart	(France) Olivier Cotte
126	10	17 March 1993	(Italy) Livigno	MO	(Canada) Jean-Luc Brassard	(France) Edgar Grospiron	(United States) Jim Moran
127	11	20 March 1993	(Germany) Oberjoch	MO	(France) Thony Hemery	(Sweden) Jörgen Pääjärvi	(United States) Rick Emerson
128	12	27 March 1993	(Norway) Lillehammer	MO	(Canada) Jean-Luc Brassard	(Canada) John Smart	(Japan) Ryūji Iwabuchi

=== Ballet ===
Num	Season	Date	Place	Event	Winner	Second	Third
118	1	10 December 1992	(France) Tignes	AC	(Norway) Rune Kristiansen	(France) Fabrice Becker	(Italy) Roberto Franco
119	2	17 December 1992	(Italy) Piancavallo	AC	(Norway) Rune Kristiansen	(Germany) Armin Weiss	(Switzerland) Heini Baumgartner
120	3	8 January 1993	(Canada) Blackcomb	AC	(Norway) Rune Kristiansen	(France) Fabrice Becker	(Italy) Roberto Franco
121	4	15 January 1993	(United States) Breckenridge	AC	(Norway) Rune Kristiansen	(France) Fabrice Becker	(Switzerland) Heini Baumgartner
122	5	21 January 1993	(United States) Lake Placid	AC	(France) Fabrice Becker	(Norway) Rune Kristiansen	(United States) Ian Edmondson
123	6	29 January 1993	(Canada) Le Relais	AC	(Norway) Rune Kristiansen	(France) Fabrice Becker	(Switzerland) Heini Baumgartner
124	7	23 February 1993	(France) La Plagne	AC	(Norway) Rune Kristiansen	(France) Fabrice Becker	(Switzerland) Heini Baumgartner
125	8	24 February 1993	(France) La Plagne	AC	(Norway) Rune Kristiansen	(France) Fabrice Becker	(Italy) Roberto Franco
126	9	19 March 1993	(Germany) Oberjoch	AC	(Norway) Rune Kristiansen	(Switzerland) Heini Baumgartner	(Italy) Roberto Franco
127	10	26 March 1993	(Norway) Lillehammer	AC	(France) Fabrice Becker	(Norway) Rune Kristiansen	(Switzerland) Heini Baumgartner

=== Aerials ===
Num	Season	Date	Place	Event	Winner	Second	Third
116	1	11 December 1992	(France) Tignes	AE	(France) Sébastien Foucras	(Canada) Lloyd Langlois	(United States) Kris Feddersen
117	2	18 December 1992	(Italy) Piancavallo	AE	(France) Sébastien Foucras	(Canada) Lloyd Langlois	(Canada) Philippe LaRoche
118	3	10 January 1993	(Canada) Blackcomb	AE	(Canada) Andy Capicik	(France) Sébastien Foucras	(United States) Trace Worthington
119	4	17 January 1993	(United States) Breckenridge	AE	(France) Jean-Marc Bacquin	(United States) Trace Worthington	(Canada) Lloyd Langlois
120	5	23 January 1993	(United States) Lake Placid	AE	(Canada) Lloyd Langlois	(France) Sébastien Foucras	(United States) Kris Feddersen
121	6	31 January 1993	(Canada) Le Relais	AE	(Canada) Philippe LaRoche	(United States) Trace Worthington	(Canada) Lloyd Langlois
122	7	26 February 1993	(France) La Plagne	AE	(Canada) Andy Capicik	(France) Jean-Damien Climonet	(Sweden) Mats Johansson
123	8	27 February 1993	(France) La Plagne	AE	(France) Alexis Blanc	(France) Jean-Damien Climonet	(United States) Trace Worthington
124	9	28 March 1993	(Norway) Lillehammer	AE	(United States) Trace Worthington	(Canada) Lloyd Langlois	(Norway) Tor Skeie

=== Combined ===
Num	Season	Date	Place	Event	Winner	Second	Third
110	1	12 December 1992	(France) Tignes	CO	(Russia) Sergey Shupletsov	(Austria) Hugo Bonatti	(Canada) Darcy Downs
111	2	19 December 1992	(Italy) Piancavallo	CO	(Russia) Sergey Shupletsov	(United States) Trace Worthington	(Austria) Hugo Bonatti
112	3	10 January 1993	(Canada) Blackcomb	CO	(United States) Trace Worthington	(Canada) Darcy Downs	information is not available
113	4	17 January 1993	(United States) Breckenridge	CO	(United States) Trace Worthington	(Canada) Darcy Downs	information is not available
114	5	23 January 1993	(United States) Lake Placid	CO	(United States) Trace Worthington	(Russia) Sergey Shupletsov	(Canada) Darcy Downs
115	6	31 January 1993	(Canada) Le Relais	CO	(United States) Trace Worthington	(Russia) Sergey Shupletsov	(Austria) Hugo Bonatti
116	7	26 February 1993	(France) La Plagne	CO	(Canada) Darcy Downs	(United States) Trace Worthington	(Austria) Hugo Bonatti
117	8	27 February 1993	(France) La Plagne	CO	(United States) Trace Worthington	(Austria) Hugo Bonatti	(Canada) Darcy Downs
118	9	28 March 1993	(Norway) Lillehammer	CO	(United States) Trace Worthington	(Canada) Darcy Downs	(Russia) Sergey Shupletsov

== Ladies ==
=== Moguls ===
Num	Season	Date	Place	Event	Winner	Second	Third
117	1	12 December 1992	(France) Tignes	MO	(United States) Liz McIntyre	(Switzerland) Sandrine Vaucher	(France) Candice Gilg
118	2	19 December 1992	(Italy) Piancavallo	MO	(Germany) Tatjana Mittermayer	(France) Raphaëlle Monod	(Italy) Silvia Marciandi
119	3	9 January 1993	(Canada) Blackcomb	MO	(France) Raphaëlle Monod	(Germany) Tatjana Mittermayer	(France) Candice Gilg
120	4	16 January 1993	(United States) Breckenridge	MO	(Norway) Stine Lise Hattestad	(Italy) Silvia Marciandi	(Germany) Tatjana Mittermayer
121	5	22 January 1993	(United States) Lake Placid	MO	(Norway) Stine Lise Hattestad	(United States) Liz McIntyre	(France) Candice Gilg
122	6	30 January 1993	(Canada) Le Relais	MO	(Norway) Stine Lise Hattestad	(France) Raphaëlle Monod	(United States) Liz McIntyre
123	7	11 February 1993	(France) La Clusaz	MO	(France) Raphaëlle Monod	(Norway) Stine Lise Hattestad	(United States) Liz McIntyre
124	8	20 February 1993	(Switzerland) Meiringen-Hasliberg	MO	(France) Raphaëlle Monod	(Norway) Stine Lise Hattestad	(Italy) Silvia Marciandi
125	9	25 February 1993	(France) La Plagne	MO	(France) Raphaëlle Monod	(Norway) Stine Lise Hattestad	(Germany) Tatjana Mittermayer
126	10	17 March 1993	(Italy) Livigno	MO	(Norway) Stine Lise Hattestad	(Italy) Silvia Marciandi	(France) Candice Gilg
127	11	20 March 1993	(Germany) Oberjoch	MO	(Italy) Silvia Marciandi	(France) Candice Gilg	(Italy) Petra Moroder
128	12	27 March 1993	(Norway) Lillehammer	MO	(Norway) Stine Lise Hattestad	(Germany) Tatjana Mittermayer	(France) Candice Gilg

=== Ballet ===
Num	Season	Date	Place	Event	Winner	Second	Third
119	1	10 December 1992	(France) Tignes	AC	(United States) Ellen Breen	(Sweden) Annika Johansson	(United States) Sharon Petzold
120	2	17 December 1992	(Italy) Piancavallo	AC	(United States) Ellen Breen	(Russia) Elena Batalova	(United States) Sharon Petzold
121	3	8 January 1993	(Canada) Blackcomb	AC	(France) Cathy Fechoz	(United States) Ellen Breen	(United States) Sharon Petzold
122	4	15 January 1993	(United States) Breckenridge	AC	(United States) Ellen Breen	(France) Cathy Fechoz	(United States) Kristean Porter
123	5	21 January 1993	(United States) Lake Placid	AC	(United States) Sharon Petzold	(United Kingdom) Julia Snell	(United States) Ellen Breen
124	6	11 February 1993	(Switzerland) Gstaad	AC	(United States) Sharon Petzold	(United States) Ellen Breen	(Sweden) Annika Johansson
125	7	23 February 1993	(France) La Plagne	AC	(United States) Ellen Breen	(United Kingdom) Julia Snell	(Sweden) Annika Johansson
126	8	24 February 1993	(France) La Plagne	AC	(United States) Ellen Breen	(Sweden) Annika Johansson	(United Kingdom) Julia Snell
127	9	19 March 1993	(Germany) Oberjoch	AC	(United States) Ellen Breen	(Sweden) Annika Johansson	(United States) Sharon Petzold
128	10	26 March 1993	(Norway) Lillehammer	AC	(United States) Ellen Breen	(Sweden) Annika Johansson	(United States) Sharon Petzold

=== Aerials ===
Num	Season	Date	Place	Event	Winner	Second	Third
119	1	11 December 1992	(France) Tignes	AE	(Russia) Natalia Orekhova	(United States) Kristean Porter	(Uzbekistan) Lina Cheryazova
120	2	18 December 1992	(Italy) Piancavallo	AE	(Uzbekistan) Lina Cheryazova	(United States) Stacey Blumer	(Russia) Natalia Orekhova
121	3	10 January 1993	(Canada) Blackcomb	AE	(United States) Kristean Porter	(Norway) Hilde Synnøve Lid	(Canada) Caroline Olivier
122	4	17 January 1993	(United States) Breckenridge	AE	(Uzbekistan) Lina Cheryazova	(Sweden) Marie Lindgren	(Canada) Caroline Olivier
123	5	23 January 1993	(United States) Lake Placid	AE	(Uzbekistan) Lina Cheryazova	(Sweden) Marie Lindgren	(Norway) Hilde Synnøve Lid
124	6	31 January 1993	(Canada) Le Relais	AE	(Uzbekistan) Lina Cheryazova	(Switzerland) Colette Brand	(United States) Sue Michalski-Cagen
125	7	26 February 1993	(France) La Plagne	AE	(Uzbekistan) Lina Cheryazova	(Switzerland) Colette Brand	(United States) Nikki Stone
126	8	27 February 1993	(France) La Plagne	AE	(Switzerland) Colette Brand	(Uzbekistan) Lina Cheryazova	(United States) Nikki Stone
127	9	28 March 1993	(Norway) Lillehammer	AE	(Uzbekistan) Lina Cheryazova	(Canada) Kennedy Ryan	(Switzerland) Colette Brand

=== Combined ===
Num	Season	Date	Place	Event	Winner	Second	Third
112	1	12 December 1992	(France) Tignes	CO	(Switzerland) Maja Schmid	(United States) Kristean Porter	(Russia) Natalia Orekhova
113	2	19 December 1992	(Italy) Piancavallo	CO	(Russia) Natalia Orekhova	(Switzerland) Maja Schmid	(United States) Kristean Porter
114	3	10 January 1993	(Canada) Blackcomb	CO	(United States) Kristean Porter	(Canada) Katherina Kubenk	(Switzerland) Maja Schmid
115	4	17 January 1993	(United States) Breckenridge	CO	(Canada) Katherina Kubenk	(United States) Kristean Porter	(Switzerland) Maja Schmid
116	5	23 January 1993	(United States) Lake Placid	CO	(Switzerland) Maja Schmid	(Canada) Katherina Kubenk	(Russia) Natalia Orekhova
117	6	31 January 1993	(Canada) Le Relais	CO	(Canada) Katherina Kubenk	(Russia) Natalia Orekhova	(Switzerland) Maja Schmid
118	7	26 February 1993	(France) La Plagne	CO	(Switzerland) Maja Schmid	(Canada) Katherina Kubenk	(United Kingdom) Jilly Curry
119	8	27 February 1993	(France) La Plagne	CO	(Canada) Katherina Kubenk	(United Kingdom) Jilly Curry	(Switzerland) Maja Schmid
120	9	28 March 1993	(Norway) Lillehammer	CO	(Canada) Katherina Kubenk	(Switzerland) Maja Schmid	(Russia) Natalia Orekhova

== Men's standings ==
=== Overall ===
Rank		Points
1	(United States) Trace Worthington	130
2	(Norway) Rune Kristiansen	100
3	(Canada) Jean-Luc Brassard	98
4	(France) Fabrice Becker	97
5	(Canada) Lloyd Langlois	95

- Standings after 40 races.

=== Moguls ===
Rank		Points
1	(Canada) Jean-Luc Brassard	880
2	(Canada) John Smart	812
3	(France) Olivier Cotte	716
4	(France) Bruno Bertrand	680
5	(Sweden) Jörgen Pääjärvi	640

- Standings after 12 races.

=== Aerials ===
Rank		Points
1	(Canada) Lloyd Langlois	572
2	(United States) Trace Worthington	564
3	(France) Sébastien Foucras	560
4	(United States) Kris Feddersen	520
5	(France) Jean-Marc Bacquin	512

- Standings after 9 races.

=== Ballet ===
Rank		Points
1	(Norway) Rune Kristiansen	700
2	(France) Fabrice Becker	680
3	(Switzerland) Heini Baumgartner	644
4	(Italy) Roberto Franco	620
5	(Germany) Armin Weiss	568

- Standings after 10 races.

=== Combined ===
Rank		Points
1	(United States) Trace Worthington	600
2	(Canada) Darcy Downs	572
3	(Austria) Hugo Bonatti	556
4	(Russia) Sergey Shupletsov	484
5	(Uzbekistan) Sergey Brener	84

- Standings after 9 races.

== Ladies' standings ==
=== Overall ===
Rank		Points
1	(Canada) Katherina Kubenk	174
2	(Switzerland) Maja Schmid	153
3	(United Kingdom) Jilly Curry	132
4	(United States) Kristean Porter	128
5	(Russia) Natalia Orekhova	104

- Standings after 40 races.

=== Moguls ===
Rank		Points
1	(Norway) Stine Lise Hattestad	876
2	(Italy) Silvia Marciandi	824
3	(France) Candice Gilg	812
4	(Germany) Tatjana Mittermayer	804
5	(United States) Liz McIntyre	796

- Standings after 12 races.

=== Aerials ===
Rank		Points
1	(Uzbekistan) Lina Cheryazova	600
2	(Switzerland) Colette Brand	560
3	(United States) Nikki Stone	516
4	(Sweden) Annika Johansson	504
5	(Norway) Hilde Synnøve Lid	496

- Standings after 9 races.

=== Ballet ===
Rank		Points
1	(United States) Ellen Breen	800
2	(United States) Sharon Petzold	756
3	(Sweden) Annika Johansson	740
4	(United Kingdom) Julia Snell	708
5	(United States) Karen Hunter	616

- Standings after 10 races.

=== Combined ===
Rank		Points
1	(Canada) Katherina Kubenk	592
2	(Switzerland) Maja Schmid	584
3	(United States) Kristean Porter	552
4	(United Kingdom) Jilly Curry	536
5	(Russia) Natalia Orekhova	472

- Standings after 9 races.
