= 1991–92 FIS Freestyle Ski World Cup =

Freestyle skiing competitive season

Freestyle Skiing World Cup 1991/92
Discipline	Men	Women
Overall	(United States) Trace Worthington	(Switzerland) Conny Kissling (9)
Moguls	(France) Edgar Grospiron	(United States) Donna Weinbrecht
Aerials	(Canada) Philippe LaRoche	(Australia) Kirstie Marshall
Ballet	(Norway) Rune Kristiansen	(Switzerland) Conny Kissling (3)
Combined	(United States) Trace Worthington	(Switzerland) Conny Kissling (9)

Competition
Locations	11	12
Individual	44	45

The 1991/92 FIS Freestyle Skiing World Cup was the thirteenth World Cup season in freestyle skiing organised by International Ski Federation. The season started on 2 December 1991 and ended on 14 March 1992. This season included four disciplines: aerials, moguls, ballet and combined.

Competitors of Soviet Union were competing under this flag until 25 December 1991 when this country fall apart. Since then they competed for the Commonwealth of Independent States.

== Men ==
=== Moguls ===
Num	Season	Date	Place	Event	Winner	Second	Third
106	1	2 December 1991	(France) Tignes	MO	(France) Olivier Allamand	(Canada) Jean-Luc Brassard	(France) Edgar Grospiron
107	2	12 December 1991	(Switzerland) Zermatt	MO	(Canada) Jean-Luc Brassard	(France) Edgar Grospiron	(United States) Nelson Carmichael
108	4	17 December 1991	(Italy) Piancavallo	MO	(Sweden) Jörgen Pääjärvi	(France) Olivier Allamand	(Canada) Jean-Luc Brassard
109	5	21 December 1991	(France) Morzine	MO	(United States) Nelson Carmichael	(France) Edgar Grospiron	(Canada) Jean-Luc Brassard
110	5	11 January 1992	(Canada) Blackcomb	MO	(France) Edgar Grospiron	(United States) Nelson Carmichael	(United States) Chuck Martin
111	6	18 January 1992	(United States) Breckenridge	MO	(France) Edgar Grospiron	(France) Youri Gilg	(Sweden) Leif Persson
112	7	24 January 1992	(United States) Lake Placid	MO	(United States) Nelson Carmichael	(Canada) Jean-Luc Brassard	(Canada) Lane Barrett
113	8	1 February 1992	(Germany) Oberjoch	MO	(France) Edgar Grospiron	(Canada) Jean-Luc Brassard	(Sweden) Fredric Ericksson
114	9	29 February 1992	(Japan) Inawashiro	MO	(France) Edgar Grospiron	(United States) Nelson Carmichael	(France) Olivier Allamand
115	10	7 March 1992	(Japan) Madarao	MO	(France) Edgar Grospiron	(United States) Nelson Carmichael	(Canada) Jean-Luc Brassard
116	11	13 March 1992	(Austria) Altenmarkt-Zauchensee	MO	(France) Edgar Grospiron	(France) Olivier Allamand	(Canada) Jean-Luc Brassard

=== Aerials ===
Num	Season	Date	Place	Event	Winner	Second	Third
105	1	7 December 1991	(France) Tignes	AE	(France) Jean-Marc Bacquin	(Canada) Philippe LaRoche	(France) Sébastien Foucras
106	2	11 December 1991	(Switzerland) Zermatt	AE	(United States) Trace Worthington	(United States) Eric Bergoust	(Canada) Philippe LaRoche
107	3	15 Dec 1991	(Italy) Piancavallo	AE	(Canada) Philippe LaRoche	(France) Didier Méda	(France) Jean-Marc Bacquin
108	4	12 January 1992	(Canada) Blackcomb	AE	(Canada) Philippe LaRoche	(United States) Trace Worthington	(United States) Kris Feddersen
109	5	19 January 1992	(United States) Breckenridge	AE	(United States) Eric Bergoust	(France) Didier Méda	(United States) Kris Feddersen
110	6	25 January 1992	(United States) Lake Placid	AE	(Canada) Philippe LaRoche	(United States) Kris Feddersen	(United States) Trace Worthington
111	7	2 February 1992	(Germany) Oberjoch	AE	(Canada) Philippe LaRoche	(France) Jean-Marc Bacquin	(Canada) Nicolas Fontaine
112	8	1 March 1992	(Japan) Inawashiro	AE	(France) Jean-Marc Bacquin	(France) Didier Méda	(United States) Kris Feddersen
113	9	5 March 1992	(Japan) Madarao	AE	(United States) Trace Worthington	(Canada) Nicolas Fontaine	(France) Jean-Marc Bacquin
114	10	8 March 1992	(Japan) Madarao	AE	(France) Didier Méda	(Canada) Nicolas Fontaine	(United States) Dave Valenti
115	11	14 March 1992	(Austria) Altenmarkt-Zauchensee	AE	(France) Jean-Marc Bacquin	(United States) Kris Feddersen	(Canada) Philippe LaRoche

=== Ballet ===
Num	Season	Date	Place	Event	Winner	Second	Third
107	1	5 December 1991	(France) Tignes	AC	(Norway) Rune Kristiansen	(Italy) Roberto Franco	(Canada) Richard Pierce
108	2	10 December 1991	(Switzerland) Zermatt	AC	(United States) Lane Spina	(Norway) Rune Kristiansen	(Italy) Roberto Franco
109	3	16 December 1991	(Italy) Piancavallo	AC	(Norway) Rune Kristiansen	(Canada) Richard Pierce	(United States) Lane Spina
110	4	10 January 1992	(Canada) Blackcomb	AC	(United States) Lane Spina	(Canada) Richard Pierce	(France) Fabrice Becker
111	5	16 January 1992	(United States) Breckenridge	AC	(Norway) Rune Kristiansen	(France) Youri Gilg	(United States) Lane Spina
112	6	17 January 1992	(United States) Breckenridge	AC	(France) Fabrice Becker	(Norway) Rune Kristiansen	(United States) Lane Spina
113	7	23 January 1992	(United States) Lake Placid	AC	(United States) Lane Spina	(France) Fabrice Becker	(Canada) Richard Pierce
114	8	31 January 1992	(Germany) Oberjoch	AC	(France) Fabrice Becker	(Canada) Richard Pierce	(Norway) Rune Kristiansen
115	9	28 February 1992	(Japan) Inawashiro	AC	(France) Fabrice Becker	(Norway) Rune Kristiansen	(Germany) Armin Weiss
116	10	6 March 1992	(Japan) Madarao	AC	(Norway) Rune Kristiansen	(United States) Lane Spina	(France) Fabrice Becker
117	11	12 March 1992	(Austria) Altenmarkt-Zauchensee	AC	(France) Fabrice Becker	(Canada) Richard Pierce	(Canada) Dave Walker

=== Combined ===
Num	Season	Date	Place	Event	Winner	Second	Third
99	1	7 December 1991	(France) Tignes	CO	(France) Éric Laboureix	(United States) Trace Worthington	(Austria) Hugo Bonatti
100	2	12 December 1991	(Switzerland) Zermatt	CO	(United States) Trace Worthington	(France) Éric Laboureix	(Canada) David Belhumeur
101	3	17 December 1991	(Italy) Piancavallo	CO	(United States) Trace Worthington	(France) Éric Laboureix	(Austria) Hugo Bonatti
102	4	12 January 1992	(Canada) Blackcomb	CO	(United States) Trace Worthington	(Austria) Hugo Bonatti	(Canada) David Belhumeur
103	5	19 January 1992	(United States) Breckenridge	CO	(United States) Trace Worthington	(Canada) David Belhumeur	(Austria) Hugo Bonatti
104	6	25 January 1992	(United States) Lake Placid	CO	(United States) Trace Worthington	(Canada) David Belhumeur	(Switzerland) Bernard Brandt
105	7	2 February 1992	(Germany) Oberjoch	CO	(Canada) David Belhumeur	(United States) Trace Worthington	(Austria) Hugo Bonatti
106	8	1 March 1992	(Japan) Inawashiro	CO	(United States) Trace Worthington	(Canada) David Belhumeur	(Austria) Hugo Bonatti
107	9	5 March 1992	(Japan) Madarao	CO	(United States) Trace Worthington	(Austria) Hugo Bonatti	(Canada) David Belhumeur
108	10	8 March 1992	(Japan) Madarao	CO	(United States) Trace Worthington	(Austria) Hugo Bonatti	(Canada) David Belhumeur
109	11	14 March 1992	(Austria) Altenmarkt-Zauchensee	CO	(United States) Trace Worthington	(Canada) David Belhumeur	(Commonwealth of Independent States) Sergey Shupletsov

== Ladies ==
=== Aerials ===
Num	Season	Date	Place	Event	Winner	Second	Third
107	1	7 December 1991	(France) Tignes	AE	(Australia) Kirstie Marshall	(Sweden) Marie Lindgren	(United Kingdom) Jilly Curry
108	2	11 December 1991	(Switzerland) Zermatt	AE	(Germany) Elfie Simchen	(Soviet Union) Lina Cheryazova	(Switzerland) Colette Brand
109	3	15 December 1991	(Italy) Piancavallo	AE	(Australia) Kirstie Marshall	(Switzerland) Colette Brand	(Sweden) Marie Lindgren
110	4	12 January 1992	(Canada) Blackcomb	AE	(Australia) Kirstie Marshall	(Germany) Elfie Simchen	(Switzerland) Colette Brand
111	5	19 January 1992	(United States) Breckenridge	AE	(Australia) Kirstie Marshall	(Norway) Hilde Synnøve Lid	(United States) Sue Michalski-Cagen
112	6	22 January 1992	(Canada) Montreal	AE	(Australia) Kirstie Marshall	(Sweden) Marie Lindgren	(Switzerland) Colette Brand
113	7	25 January 1992	(United States) Lake Placid	AE	(Germany) Elfie Simchen	(Sweden) Marie Lindgren	(United States) Kristean Porter
114	8	2 February 1992	(Germany) Oberjoch	AE	(Commonwealth of Independent States) Lina Cheryazova	(Australia) Kirstie Marshall	(Switzerland) Colette Brand
115	9	1 March 1992	(Japan) Inawashiro	AE	(United States) Nikki Stone	(Australia) Kirstie Marshall	(Switzerland) Colette Brand
116	10	5 March 1992	(Japan) Madarao	AE	(Australia) Kirstie Marshall	(United States) Nikki Stone	(Switzerland) Colette Brand
117	11	8 March 1992	(Japan) Madarao	AE	(Germany) Elfie Simchen	(United States) Nikki Stone	(Switzerland) Colette Brand
118	12	14 March 1992	(Austria) Altenmarkt-Zauchensee	AE	(Sweden) Marie Lindgren	(Switzerland) Karin Kuster	(Switzerland) Colette Brand

=== Moguls ===
Num	Season	Date	Place	Event	Winner	Second	Third
106	1	6 December 1991	(France) Tignes	MO	(United States) Donna Weinbrecht	(Norway) Stine Lise Hattestad	(United States) Liz McIntyre
107	2	12 December 1991	(Switzerland) Zermatt	MO	(France) Raphaëlle Monod	(United States) Donna Weinbrecht	(Norway) Stine Lise Hattestad
108	4	17 December 1991	(Italy) Piancavallo	MO	(United States) Donna Weinbrecht	(Norway) Stine Lise Hattestad	(France) Raphaëlle Monod
109	5	21 December 1991	(France) Morzine	MO	(United States) Donna Weinbrecht	(France) Raphaëlle Monod	(Canada) LeeLee Morrison
110	5	11 January 1992	(Canada) Blackcomb	MO	(United States) Donna Weinbrecht	(United States) Maggie Connor	(United States) Liz McIntyre
111	6	18 January 1992	(United States) Breckenridge	MO	(United States) Donna Weinbrecht	(Italy) Silvia Marciandi	(Norway) Stine Lise Hattestad
112	7	24 January 1992	(United States) Lake Placid	MO	(United States) Donna Weinbrecht	(France) Raphaëlle Monod	(Germany) Birgit Stein-Keppler
113	8	1 February 1992	(Germany) Oberjoch	MO	(United States) Donna Weinbrecht	(Norway) Stine Lise Hattestad	(Germany) Tatjana Mittermayer
114	9	29 February 1992	(Japan) Inawashiro	MO	(United States) Donna Weinbrecht	(Norway) Stine Lise Hattestad	(Germany) Tatjana Mittermayer
115	10	7 March 1992	(Japan) Madarao	MO	(France) Raphaëlle Monod	(United States) Donna Weinbrecht	(Norway) Stine Lise Hattestad
116	11	13 March 1992	(Austria) Altenmarkt-Zauchensee	MO	(France) Raphaëlle Monod	(United States) Donna Weinbrecht	(Norway) Stine Lise Hattestad

=== Ballet ===
Num	Season	Date	Place	Event	Winner	Second	Third
108	1	5 December 1991	(France) Tignes	AC	(Switzerland) Conny Kissling	(United Kingdom) Julia Snell	(United States) Ellen Breen
109	2	10 December 1991	(Switzerland) Zermatt	AC	(Switzerland) Conny Kissling	(United States) Sharon Petzold	(Soviet Union) Elena Batalova
110	3	16 December 1991	(Italy) Piancavallo	AC	(Switzerland) Conny Kissling	(United States) Sharon Petzold	(United States) Karen Hunter
111	4	10 January 1992	(Canada) Blackcomb	AC	(Switzerland) Conny Kissling	(France) Cathy Fechoz	(Switzerland) Monika Kamber
112	5	16 January 1992	(United States) Breckenridge	AC	(Switzerland) Conny Kissling	(United States) Sharon Petzold	(United States) Karen Hunter
113	6	17 January 1992	(United States) Breckenridge	AC	(Switzerland) Conny Kissling	(United States) Sharon Petzold	(France) Cathy Fechoz
114	7	23 January 1992	(United States) Lake Placid	AC	(Switzerland) Conny Kissling	(United States) Sharon Petzold	(Sweden) Annika Johansson
115	8	31 January 1992	(Germany) Oberjoch	AC	(Switzerland) Conny Kissling	(United States) Sharon Petzold	(France) Cathy Fechoz
116	9	28 February 1992	(Japan) Inawashiro	AC	(Switzerland) Conny Kissling	(United States) Ellen Breen	(United Kingdom) Julia Snell
117	10	6 March 1992	(Japan) Madarao	AC	(United Kingdom) Julia Snell	(Switzerland) Conny Kissling	(United States) Sharon Petzold
118	11	12 March 1992	(Austria) Altenmarkt-Zauchensee	AC	(France) Cathy Fechoz	(Switzerland) Conny Kissling	(United States) Sharon Petzold

=== Combined ===
Num	Season	Date	Place	Event	Winner	Second	Third
101	1	7 December 1991	(France) Tignes	CO	(Switzerland) Conny Kissling	(United Kingdom) Jilly Curry	(Canada) Katherina Kubenk
102	2	12 December 1991	(Switzerland) Zermatt	CO	(Switzerland) Conny Kissling	(Switzerland) Maja Schmid	(Canada) Katherina Kubenk
103	3	17 December 1991	(Italy) Piancavallo	CO	(Switzerland) Conny Kissling	(Switzerland) Maja Schmid	(United Kingdom) Jilly Curry
104	4	12 January 1992	(Canada) Blackcomb	CO	(Canada) Katherina Kubenk	(New Zealand) Kylie Gill	(Switzerland) Maja Schmid
105	5	19 January 1992	(United States) Breckenridge	CO	(Switzerland) Conny Kissling	(United Kingdom) Jilly Curry	(Switzerland) Maja Schmid
106	6	25 January 1992	(United States) Lake Placid	CO	(Switzerland) Maja Schmid	(Switzerland) Conny Kissling	(United States) Kristean Porter
107	7	2 February 1992	(Germany) Oberjoch	CO	(United Kingdom) Jilly Curry	(Switzerland) Maja Schmid	(Switzerland) Conny Kissling
108	8	1 March 1992	(Japan) Inawashiro	CO	(Switzerland) Conny Kissling	(United Kingdom) Jilly Curry	(Canada) Katherina Kubenk
109	9	5 March 1992	(Japan) Madarao	CO	(Switzerland) Conny Kissling	(United Kingdom) Jilly Curry	(Switzerland) Maja Schmid
110	10	8 March 1992	(Japan) Madarao	CO	(Switzerland) Maja Schmid	(Switzerland) Conny Kissling	(United Kingdom) Jilly Curry
111	11	14 March 1992	(Austria) Altenmarkt-Zauchensee	CO	(Switzerland) Conny Kissling	(United Kingdom) Jilly Curry	(United States) Stacey Blumer

== Men's standings ==
=== Overall ===
Rank		Points
1	(United States) Trace Worthington	49
2	(France) Youri Gilg	33
3	(Canada) David Belhumeur	33
4	(Austria) Hugo Bonatti	33
5	(France) Edgar Grospiron	25

- Standings after 44 races.

=== Moguls ===
Rank		Points
1	(France) Edgar Grospiron	198
2	(Canada) Jean-Luc Brassard	189
3	(France) Olivier Allamand	184
4	(United States) Nelson Carmichael	176
5	(France) Youri Gilg	162

- Standings after 11 races.

=== Aerials ===
Rank		Points
1	(Canada) Philippe LaRoche	189
2	(France) Jean-Marc Bacquin	186
3	(United States) Kris Feddersen	180
4	(France) Didier Méda	177
5	(United States) Trace Worthington	175

- Standings after 11 races.

=== Ballet ===
Rank		Points
1	(Norway) Rune Kristiansen	195
2	(France) Fabrice Becker	191
3	(United States) Lane Spina	190
4	(Canada) Richard Pierce	185
5	(Italy) Roberto Franco	172

- Standings after 11 races.

=== Combined ===
Rank		Points
1	(United States) Trace Worthington	120
2	(Canada) David Belhumeur	110
3	(Austria) Hugo Bonatti	107
4	(Switzerland) Bernard Brandt	46
5	(France) Éric Laboureix	43

- Standings after 11 races.

== Ladies' standings ==
=== Overall ===
Rank		Points
1	(Switzerland) Conny Kissling	22
2	(Switzerland) Maja Schmid	15
3	(United Kingdom) Jilly Curry	13
4	(United States) Donna Weinbrecht	12
5	(Australia) Kirstie Marshall	11

- Standings after 45 races.

=== Moguls ===
Rank		Points
1	(United States) Donna Weinbrecht	96
2	(Norway) Stine Lise Hattestad	84
3	(France) Raphaëlle Monod	83
4	(Germany) Birgit Stein-Keppler	69
5	(Germany) Tatjana Mittermayer	67

- Standings after 11 races.

=== Aerials ===
Rank		Points
1	(Australia) Kirstie Marshall	103
2	(Switzerland) Colette Brand	91
3	(Sweden) Marie Lindgren	83
4	(Germany) Elfie Simchen	81
5	(Norway) Hilde Synnøve Lid	67

- Standings after 12 races.

=== Ballet ===
Rank		Points
1	(Switzerland) Conny Kissling	96
2	(United States) Sharon Petzold	86
3	(France) Cathy Fechoz	73
4	(Sweden) Annika Johansson	68
5	(United Kingdom) Julia Snell	66

- Standings after 11 races.

=== Combined ===
Rank		Points
1	(Switzerland) Conny Kissling	63
2	(Switzerland) Maja Schmid	55
3	(United Kingdom) Jilly Curry	55
4	(Canada) Katherina Kubenk	43
5	(United States) Kristean Porter	15

- Standings after 11 races.
