= Kanthaugen Freestyle Arena =

Stadium in Lillehammer, Oppland, Norway

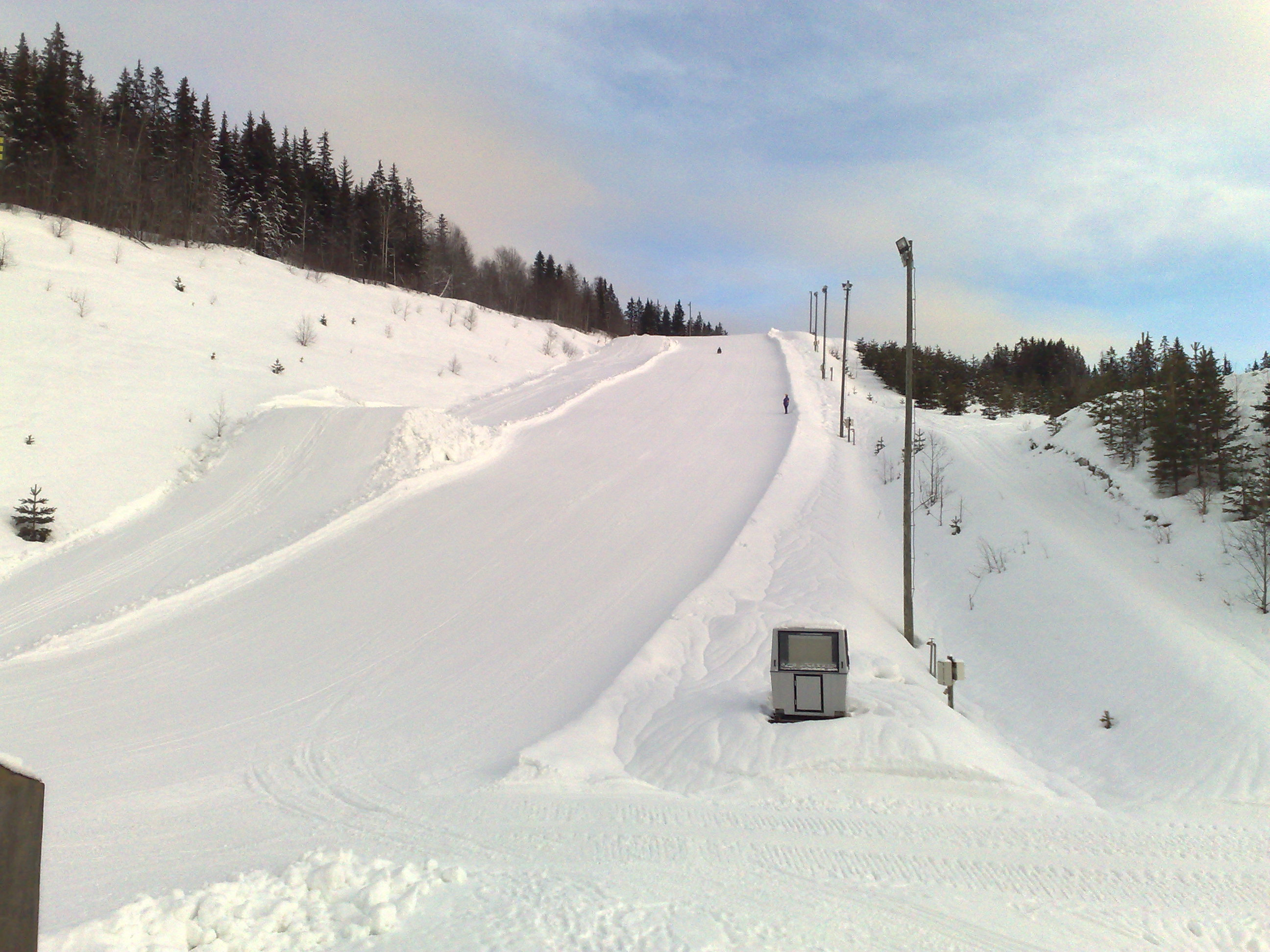
- Interactive map of Kanthaugen Freestyle Arena
- Full name: Kanthaugen Freestyleanlegg
- Location: Lillehammer, Norway
- Coordinates: 61°07′26″N 10°29′24″E
- Owner: Lillehammer Olympiapark
- Capacity: 15,000 (aerials and ski ballet); 12,000 (moguls)

Construction
- Opened: 1992
- Cost: 20.3 million kr
- Architect: Økaw Arkitekter
- Main contractor: Tore Løkke

Tenants
- 1994 Winter Olympics; 2016 Winter Youth Olympics; FIS Freestyle Skiing World Cup (1993, 1995)

Kanthaugen Freestyle Arena (Norwegian: Kanthaugen Freestyleanlegg) is a freestyle skiing stadium located in the hillside area of Kanthaugen in Lillehammer, Norway. Opened in 1992, it was built for the 1994 Winter Olympics. The venue consists of three hills—one each for aerials, moguls and ski ballet. The moguls hill has a capacity for 12,000 spectators while the other two have a 15,000-person capacity. The arena is designated as Norway's national venue for freestyle skiing. It hosted the FIS Freestyle Skiing World Cup in 1993 and 1995, and freestyle skiing and snowboarding at the 2016 Winter Youth Olympics. The arena is owned by Lillehammer Olympiapark and is located adjacent to the ski jumping hill Lysgårdsbakken.

== Construction ==
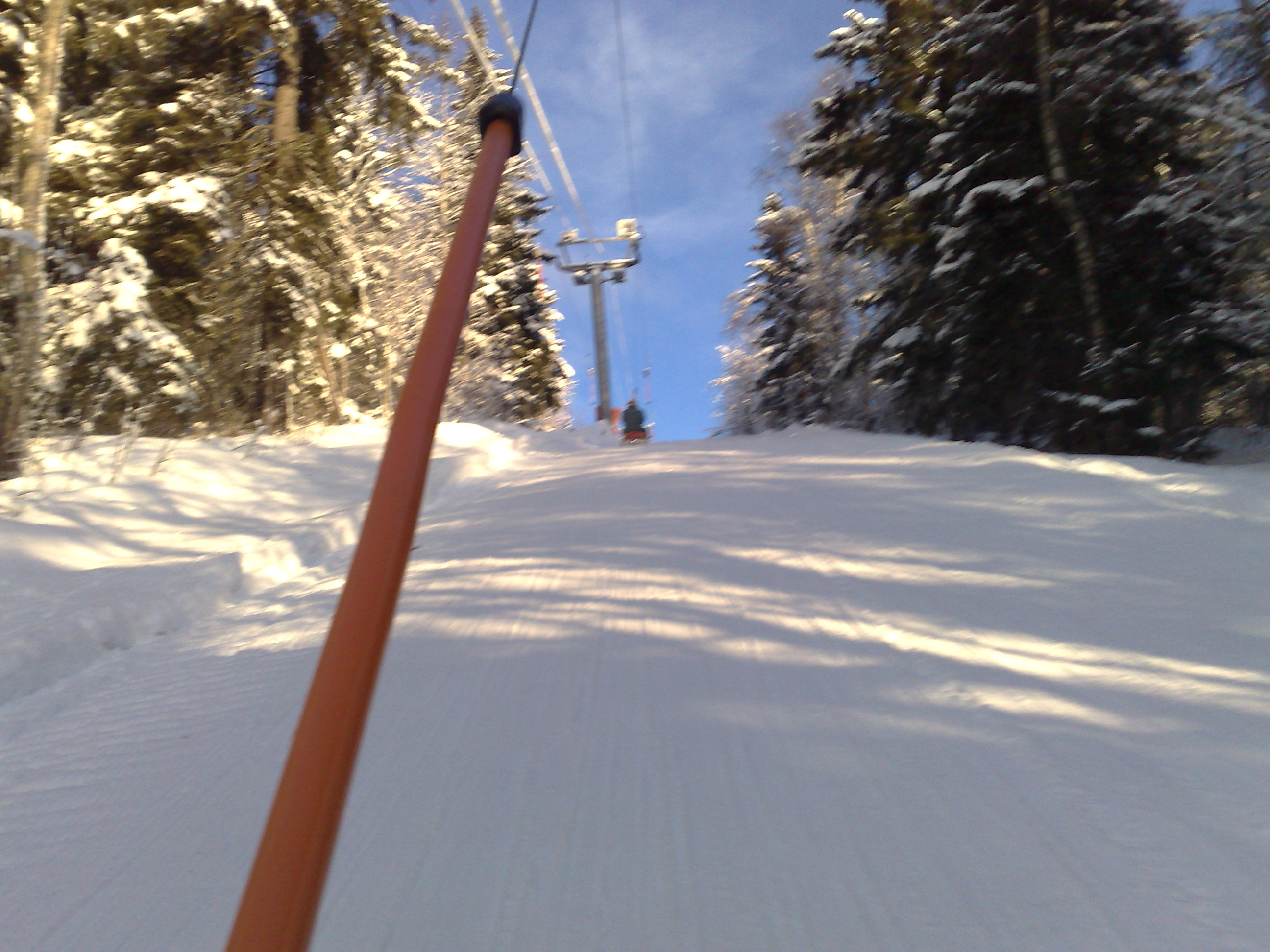
The ski lift

Kanthaugen has traditionally served as a recreational area for Lillehammer, and has in particular been used for alpine skiing. In 1946, Norway's then-largest ski lift was installed between Stampesletta and Kanthaugen. It remained in use until the late 1970s. At the time of the closing, a local businessman proposed that it be renovated and that a tobogganing slide be built from Kanthaugen to Stampesletta. The plans were met by local opposition and were not carried through.

Venue planning started after Lillehammer was awarded the Olympics in 1988. In the bid, Kanthaugen had been envisaged as the site of the sliding center. In 1989, the Lillehammer Olympic Organizing Committee (LOOC) proposed that the ski jumping hill and ski stadium instead be located there. Placing venues at Kanthaugen was controversial, as it would result in permanent encroachments in one of the town's main recreational areas. Ultimately, only the freestyle arena and ski jump were placed at Kanthaugen, with the ski stadium placed further away from town. Kanthaugen Freestyle Arena was along with Lysgårdsbakken designed by Økaw Arkitekter. The area development plan was passed in August 1991. The responsibility for construction originally rested on Lillehammer Municipality, but LOOC took over responsibility in November 1991. The decision to include aerials in the Olympic program was made in October 1992.

Tore Løkke was selected as the main contractor. Construction cost 20.3 million Norwegian krone (NOK), of which NOK 3.3 million was paid for by the municipality and NOK 17 million was paid for by LOOC. The venue was completed in the fall of 1992 and was the first freestyle skiing arena in the world to feature a common spectator area for all three event hills. The temporary structures used during the Olympics were completed in December 1993. A jibbing park was installed in 2008.

== Facilities ==
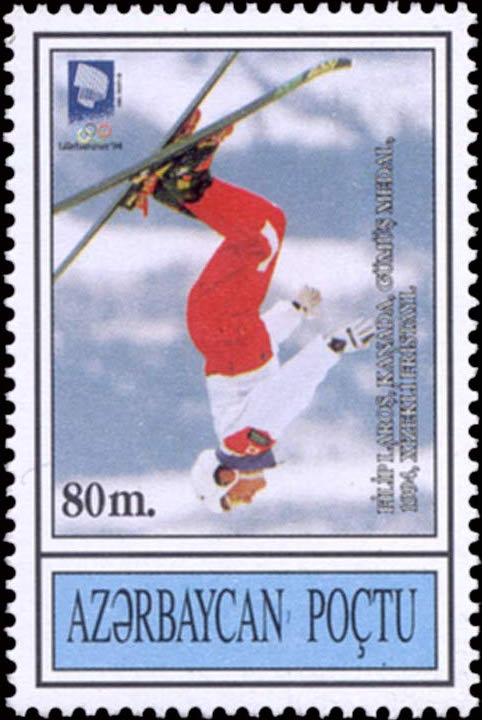
Philippe LaRoche during the men's moguls at the 1994 Winter Olympics

The venue consists of three hills, each tailor-made for aerials, moguls and ski ballet, respectively. Above the Olympic hills is a 1-kilometer (0.6 mi) long tobogganing hill which uses the competitive area as a finish. At the base of the hill is the spectator area, which featured temporary bleachers during the Olympics. The spectator capacity for aerials and ski ballet is 15,000, while it is 12,000 for moguls. Also at the foot of the hill is a jury tower overlooking the aerials hill. The venue is equipped with snowmaking equipment, a T-bar lift and floodlights. The arena is located next to the ski jumping hill Lysgårdsbakken, with which it shares some broadcasting and telecommunications facilities. During the Olympics, 800 square meters (8,611 sq ft) of temporary buildings, including tents, were erected at the venue. Kanthaugen is one kilometer (half a mile) east of Lillehammer's town center and owned and operated by Lillehammer Olympiapark, a subsidiary of Lillehammer Municipality.

== Events ==
Canada dominated the men's events during the 1994 Winter Olympics, with Jean-Luc Brassard winning the men's aerials ahead of Russian Sergey Shupletsov. In the men's moguls, Switzerlands's Andreas Schönbächler won ahead of Canada's Philippe LaRoche and Lloyd Langlois. In the women's disciplines, Norway was the only nation to take two medals, with Stine Lise Hattestad winning the women's moguls ahead of American Liz McIntyre. In the women's aerials, Lina Cheryazova won, claiming Uzbekistan's only medal at the Olympiad, ahead of Sweden's Marie Lindgren and Norway's Hilde Synnøve Lid.

Kanthaugen has hosted FIS Freestyle Skiing World Cup events twice, on 26 to 28 March 1993 and on 3 to 5 March 1995. It also hosted the Norwegian Freestyle Skiing Championships in 1993 and 1996. Lillehammer is scheduled to host the 2016 Winter Youth Olympics, with Kanthaugen to host freestyle skiing and half-pipe snowboarding. The venue is designated a Norway's national freestyle skiing venue and is the main training ground for the national team. The area around the venue is a popular recreational area for Lillehammer. Since 1995, Lillehammer Olympiapark has rented out toboggans for use in the hill, including use of the ski lift.
