= Freestyle skiing at the 1992 Winter Olympics =

Freestyle skiing at the XVI Olympic Winter Games
- Venue: Tignes
- Dates: 12–13 February
- Competitors: 71 from 18 nations

Freestyle skiing was an official sport discipline for the first time at the 1992 Winter Olympics, with medals awarded in the moguls event. The venue was Tignes about 85 km from host city Albertville.

== Medal summary ==
=== Medal table ===
Rank	Nation	Gold	Silver	Bronze	Total
1	France	1	1	0	2
2	United States	1	0	1	2
3	Unified Team	0	1	0	1
4	Norway	0	0	1	1
Totals (4 entries)		2	2	2	6

The hosts from France led the medal table, with a gold and a silver medal, both in the men's moguls.

=== Men's Events ===
Event	Gold		Silver		Bronze	
Moguls	Edgar Grospiron; France	25.81	Olivier Allamand; France	24.87	Nelson Carmichael; United States	24.82

=== Women's Events ===
Event	Gold		Silver		Bronze	
Moguls	Donna Weinbrecht; United States	23.69	Yelizaveta Kozhevnikova; Unified Team	23.50	Stine Lise Hattestad; Norway	23.04

== Participating NOCs ==
Eighteen nations participated in freestyle skiing at Albertville.

- Argentina (1)
- Australia (2)
- Canada (7)
- Spain (2)
- Unified Team (8)
- Finland (4)
- France (6)
- Great Britain (5)
- Germany (4)
- Italy (6)
- Japan (1)
- Latvia (2)
- Norway (2)
- Puerto Rico (2)
- Slovenia (2)
- Sweden (4)
- Switzerland (5)
- United States (8)

== Demonstration events ==
Six years after the first World Championships in Tignes, while moguls were an official medal event, aerials and ballets were demonstration events; for the second time after Calgary. Aerials were dominated by the Canadians and in particular by the world champion Philippe LaRoche and by Nicolas Fontaine. Didier Méda from France, who placed second in Calgary, placed third. The women's event was won by Colette Brand from Switzerland.

For the ballet, a bit similar to figure skating but on snow, Lane Spina from the US, second in Calgary, took the third place behind Kristiansen who had put emphasis on his aerial performances. Both of them were defeated by Fabrice Becker from France who won points on composition and style for a well choreographed tango performance. Among the women, Conny Kissling won her 102nd victory, in front of Cathy Féchoz from Courchevel.

=== Men's Aerials ===
Place	Athlete	Score
1	Philippe LaRoche (CAN)	237.47
2	Nicolas Fontaine (CAN)	228.88
3	Didier Méda (FRA)	219.44
4	Jean-Marc Bacquin (FRA)	206.71
5	Kris Feddersen (USA)	201.74
6	Hugo Bonatti (AUT)	198.15
7	Trace Worthington (USA)	192.16
8	Alexander Stoegner (AUT)	187.67

=== Men's Ballet ===
Place	Athlete	Score
1	Fabrice Becker (FRA)	28.15
2	Rune Kristiansen (NOR)	28.00
3	Lane Spina (USA)	27.40
4	Richard Pierce (CAN)	27.30
5	Heini Baumgartner (SUI)	25.85
6	Armin Weiß (GER)	25.64
7	Roberto Franco (ITA)	25.50
8	Jeffrey Wintersteen (USA)	24.80

=== Women's Aerials ===
Place	Athlete	Score
1	Colette Brand (SUI)	157.51
2	Marie Lindgren (SWE)	155.10
3	Elfie Simchen (GER)	153.94
4	Jilly Curry (GBR)	151.13
5	Lina Cheryazova (EUN)	150.00
6	Hilde Synnøve Lid (NOR)	144.65
7	Kirstie Marshall (AUS)	139.55
8	Maja Schmid (SUI)	129.47

=== Women's Ballet ===
Place	Athlete	Score
1	Conny Kissling (SUI)	25.30
2	Cathy Féchoz (FRA)	25.20
3	Sharon Petzold (USA)	24.10
4	Julia Snell (GBR)	22.85
5	Annika Johansson (SWE)	22.80
6	Ellen Breen (USA)	22.30
7	Maja Schmid (SUI)	21.60
8	Raquel Gutierrez (ESP)	21.50
