= Freestyle skiing at the 1994 Winter Olympics – Women's aerials =

Women's aerials at the XVII Olympic Winter Games
- Venue: Kanthaugen Freestyle Arena
- Dates: 21–24 February 1994
- Competitors: 24 from 14 nations
- Winning Score: 166.84

Medalists
1st place, gold medalist(s)		Lina Cheryazova	Uzbekistan
2nd place, silver medalist(s)		Marie Lindgren	Sweden
3rd place, bronze medalist(s)		Hilde Synnøve Lid	Norway

The women's aerials event in freestyle skiing at the 1994 Winter Olympics in Lillehammer took place from 21 to 24 February at Kanthaugen Freestyle Arena.

== Results ==
=== Qualification ===
The top 12 advanced to the final.

Rank	Name	Country	Jump 1	Jump 2	Total	Notes
1	Kirstie Marshall	Australia	77.14	88.98	166.12	Q
2	Hilde Synnøve Lid	Norway	77.43	81.27	158.70	Q
3	Marie Lindgren	Sweden	77.43	78.27	155.70	Q
4	Caroline Olivier	Canada	75.60	77.43	153.03	Q
5	Yuliya Rakovich	Belarus	79.02	73.08	152.10	Q
6	Nataliya Orekhova	Russia	69.93	80.47	150.40	Q
7	Maja Schmid	Switzerland	68.90	80.18	149.08	Q
8	Tracy Evans	United States	76.86	71.05	147.91	Q
9	Nataliya Shertsneva	Ukraine	70.35	77.43	147.78	Q
10	Elfie Simchen	Germany	64.96	81.74	146.70	Q
11	Inna Paliyenko	Ukraine	75.98	70.20	146.18	Q
12	Lina Cheryazova	Uzbekistan	64.75	79.68	144.43	Q
13	Nikki Stone	United States	79.60	64.26	143.86	
14	Liselotte Johansson	Sweden	69.74	72.41	142.15	
15	Colette Brand	Switzerland	75.75	64.67	140.42	
16	Jacqui Cooper	Australia	61.23	78.44	139.67	
17	Yin Hong	China	64.39	70.25	134.64	
18	Ji Xiaoou	China	52.26	68.96	121.22	
19	Katherina Kubenk	Canada	38.02	76.99	115.01	
20	Kristean Porter	United States	66.26	24.88	91.14	
21	Jilly Curry	Great Britain	56.26	17.95	74.21	
-	Sonja Reichart	Germany	38.00	-	-	

=== Final ===
Rank	Name	Country	Jump 1	Jump 2	Total	Notes
1st place, gold medalist(s)	Lina Cheryazova	Uzbekistan	92.92	73.92	166.84	
2nd place, silver medalist(s)	Marie Lindgren	Sweden	81.78	84.10	165.88	
3rd place, bronze medalist(s)	Hilde Synnøve Lid	Norway	76.41	87.72	164.13	
4	Maja Schmid	Switzerland	75.27	81.63	156.90	
5	Nataliya Shertsneva	Ukraine	74.99	79.89	154.88	
6	Kirstie Marshall	Australia	79.89	70.87	150.76	
7	Tracy Evans	United States	76.70	63.07	139.77	
8	Caroline Olivier	Canada	68.35	70.61	138.96	
9	Elfie Simchen	Germany	61.42	75.04	136.46	
10	Yuliya Rakovich	Belarus	72.06	63.47	135.53	
11	Inna Paliyenko	Ukraine	63.65	71.63	135.28	
12	Nataliya Orekhova	Russia	61.26	73.66	134.92	
