= Freestyle skiing at the 1994 Winter Olympics =

Freestyle skiing at the XVII Olympic Winter Games
- Venue: Kanthaugen Freestyle Arena
- Dates: 15–24 February
- Competitors: 97 from 21 nations

The freestyle skiing competition of the 1994 Winter Olympics was held at Kanthaugen Freestyle Arena. There were four events, taking place between 15 and 24 February 1994. The freestyle program was expanded at this Olympics, with aerials, previously a demonstration event, added as a full medal event.

== Medal summary ==
=== Medal table ===
Rank	Nation	Gold	Silver	Bronze	Total
1	Canada	1	1	1	3
2	Norway	1	0	1	2
3	Switzerland	1	0	0	1
3	Uzbekistan	1	0	0	1
5	Russia	0	1	1	2
6	Sweden	0	1	0	1
6	United States	0	1	0	1
8	France	0	0	1	1
Totals (8 entries)		4	4	4	12

Canada led the medal table with one medal of each type. Five countries, Canada, Switzerland, Sweden, Russia and Uzbekistan, won their first Olympic freestyle medals. The gold medal won by Lina Cheryazova in the women's aerials was the first Olympic medal for Uzbekistan, and as of 2023, the only one won by that country at the Winter Games.

=== Men's Events ===
Event	Gold		Silver		Bronze	
Moguls	Jean-Luc Brassard; Canada	27.24	Sergey Shupletsov; Russia	26.90	Edgar Grospiron; France	26.64
Aerials	Andreas Schönbächler; Switzerland	234.67	Philippe Laroche; Canada	228.63	Lloyd Langlois; Canada	222.44

=== Women's Events ===
Event	Gold		Silver		Bronze	
Moguls	Stine Lise Hattestad; Norway	25.97	Liz McIntyre; United States	25.89	Yelizaveta Kozhevnikova; Russia	25.81
Aerials	Lina Cheryazova; Uzbekistan	166.84	Marie Lindgren; Sweden	165.88	Hilde Synnøve Lid; Norway	164.13

== Participating NOCs ==
Twenty-one nations participated in freestyle skiing at Lillehammer. Austria, Belarus, China, Kazakhstan, the Netherlands, Russia, Ukraine and Uzbekistan made their debuts in the sport.

- Australia (5)
- Austria (1)
- Belarus (4)
- Canada (11)
- China (2)
- Spain (2)
- Finland (3)
- France (8)
- Great Britain (3)
- Germany (5)
- Italy (6)
- Japan (3)
- Kazakhstan (1)
- Netherlands (1)
- Norway (4)
- Russia (6)
- Sweden (8)
- Switzerland (5)
- Ukraine (3)
- United States (12)
- Uzbekistan (3)
