= FIS Freestyle World Ski Championships 1993 =

International skiing competition

The 1993 FIS Freestyle World Ski Championships were held between March 11 and March 14 at the Altenmarkt ski resort in Austria. The World Championships featured both men's and women's events in the Moguls, Aerials, Acro Skiing and the Combined.

== Results ==
=== Men's results ===
==== Moguls ====
| Medal | Name | Nation | Result |
|---|---|---|---|
| 1st place, gold medalist(s) | Jean-Luc Brassard | Canada | 26.57 |
| 2nd place, silver medalist(s) | Fabien Bertrand | France | 25.27 |
| 3rd place, bronze medalist(s) | Olivier Cotte | France | 25.21 |

==== Aerials ====
| Medal | Name | Nation | Result |
|---|---|---|---|
| 1st place, gold medalist(s) | Philippe Laroche | Canada | 231.78 |
| 2nd place, silver medalist(s) | Richard Cobbing | United Kingdom | 229.75 |
| 3rd place, bronze medalist(s) | Jean-Marc Bacquin | France | 229.38 |

==== Acro Skiing ====
| Medal | Name | Nation | Result |
|---|---|---|---|
| 1st place, gold medalist(s) | Fabrice Becker | France | 29.30 |
| 2nd place, silver medalist(s) | Rune Kristiansen | Norway | 29.00 |
| 3rd place, bronze medalist(s) | Lane Spina | United States | 26.80 |

==== Combined ====
| Medal | Name | Nation | Result |
|---|---|---|---|
| 1st place, gold medalist(s) | Sergei Shupletsov | Russia | 27.71 |
| 2nd place, silver medalist(s) | Trace Worthington | United States | 27.66 |
| 3rd place, bronze medalist(s) | Hugo Bonatti | Austria | 25.62 |

=== Women's results ===
==== Moguls ====
| Medal | Name | Nation | Result |
|---|---|---|---|
| 1st place, gold medalist(s) | Stine Lise Hattestad | Norway | 25.21 |
| 2nd place, silver medalist(s) | Petra Moroder | Italy | 23.96 |
| 3rd place, bronze medalist(s) | Bronwen Thomas | Canada | 23.87 |

==== Aerials ====
| Medal | Name | Nation | Result |
|---|---|---|---|
| 1st place, gold medalist(s) | Lina Cheryazova | Uzbekistan | 161.37 |
| 2nd place, silver medalist(s) | Marie Lindgren | Sweden | 154.90 |
| 3rd place, bronze medalist(s) | Kristean Porter | United States | 152.99 |

==== Acro Skiing ====
| Medal | Name | Nation | Result |
|---|---|---|---|
| 1st place, gold medalist(s) | Ellen Breen | United States | 25.50 |
| 2nd place, silver medalist(s) | Sharon Petzold | United States | 24.14 |
| 3rd place, bronze medalist(s) | Cathy Fechoz | France | 23.94 |

==== Combined ====
| Medal | Name | Nation | Result |
|---|---|---|---|
| 1st place, gold medalist(s) | Katherina Kubenk | Canada | 27.96 |
| 2nd place, silver medalist(s) | Natalia Orekhova | Russia | 27.16 |
| 3rd place, bronze medalist(s) | Kristean Porter | United States | 26.77 |
