= Schönbächler =

Schönbächler is a Swiss surname. Notable people with the surname include:

- Andreas Schönbächler (born 1966), Swiss freestyle skier
- Marco Schönbächler (born 1990), Swiss football player
- Kip Schönbächler (born 1992), Swiss football player
