= Hattestad =

Hattestad is a Norwegian surname. Notable people with the surname include:

- Ola Vigen Hattestad (born 1982), Norwegian cross-country skier
- Stine Lise Hattestad (born 1966), Norwegian freestyle skier
- Trine Hattestad (born 1966), Norwegian javelin thrower
