= Lillehammer Olympiapark =

Company that operates Olympic venues in Lillehammer, Norway

Coordinates: 61.1238°N 10.4740°E

- Company type: Municipal limited company
- Industry: Sports venues
- Founded: 3 December 1990
- Headquarters: Lillehammer, Norway
- Revenue: NOK 56 million (2010)
- Net income: NOK 1.7 million (2010)
- Owner: Lillehammer Municipality
- Number of employees: 50+
- Website: olympiaparken.no

Lillehammer Olympiapark AS, trading as Olympiaparken, is a company established following the 1994 Winter Olympics to operate the Olympic venues in Lillehammer, Norway. Owned by Lillehammer Municipality, it operates five sports venues: Birkebeineren Ski Stadium, Håkons Hall, Lillehammer Olympic Bobsleigh and Luge Track, Kanthaugen Freestyle Arena and the ski jumping hill of Lysgårdsbakken. In addition to serving sports events, the company provides tourist and group activities at the venues as well as catering to larger events.

In the Lillehammer bid for the 1994 Winter Olympics, the agreement between Lillehammer Municipality and the state specified that the municipality was responsible for financing all necessary sports venues. However, after the games were awarded the responsibility was taken over by Lillehammer Olympic Organizing Committee (LOOC) and the town's five venues were ultimately funded through state grants. To allow for post-Olympic use, a fund was created by the state, of which Lillehammer Olympiapark received 146 million Norwegian krone (NOK). Unlike the Hamar venues, which survive on their fund's yield, the Lillehammer venues have used up their capital. From 2014 the post-Olympic use fund will be depleted and alternative organization and funding is being looked into. A leading proposal is that the bobsleigh and luge track be taken over by the state, while the remaining venues be retained by the company and jointly funded by the municipality and Oppland County Municipality.

== History ==
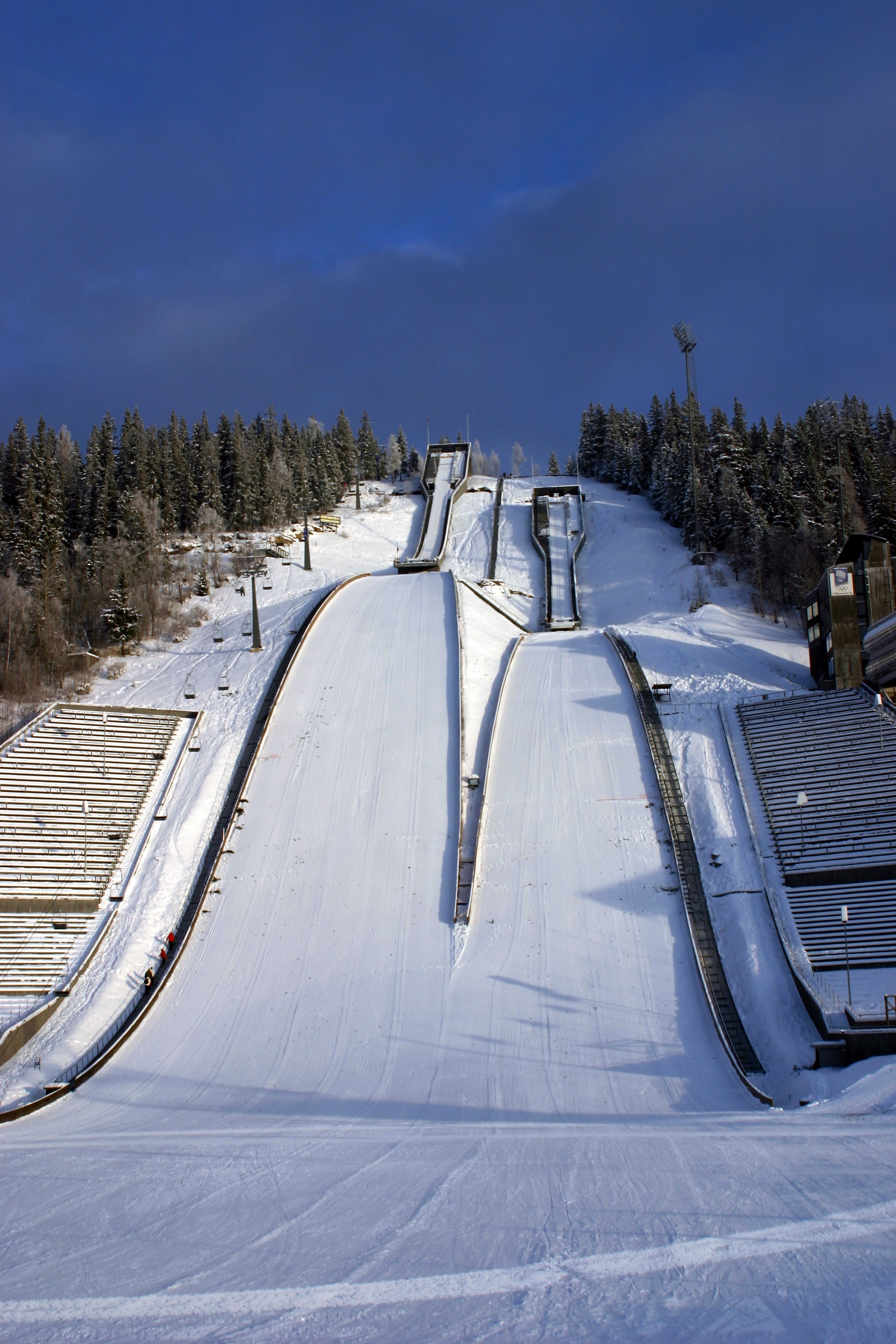
Lysgårdsbakken

As part of the 1985 and 1987 agreements with the Parliament of Norway ahead of the 1994 Winter Olympics bid, Lillehammer Municipality was responsible for financing and building all Olympic venues and associated facilities. To fulfill their obligation, the municipality established Lillehammer Olympiske Anlegg (LOA) in 1989. Mr. Haavind was hired as the company's first managing director. At the same time the Post-Olympics Use Committee was established to ensure activity at the venues after the Olympics. LOA's first task was, in cooperation with local and national authorities and LOOC, to decide on locations and budgets.

By 1989, political discussions had started regarding the creation of a fund to finance post-Olympic use. The sledding track, especially, would incur high operating costs, estimated at between NOK 5 and 6 million per year. Total deficits for the five Lillehammer venues were in 1990 estimated at ca. NOK 15 million per year. Initially the government offered to grant NOK 55 million for the fund, but the Post-Olympic Use Committee estimated that NOK 215 million would be necessary. They further proposed that the capital could be used as share capital in the proposed company Olympia Vekst, which would be jointly privately and publicly owned and operate the venues.

The budgets were reviewed by Parliament on 23 April 1990. They also decided to re-organize the Olympics into a concern model, which saw both LOA and the Post-Olympics Use Committees becoming subsidiaries of LOOC, and the name of the Post-Olympics Use Committees changing to Lillehammer Olympiavekst (LOV). Separate companies were established to construct the venues in Hamar Municipality and Gjøvik Municipality, owned by the respective municipalities. The municipal governments of Øyer Municipality and Ringebu Municipality each received a 24.5-percent stake in LOV. Lillehammer Municipality gained a 24.5-percent stake in the new holding company, Lillehammer '94 AS. Gerhard Heiberg, President of LOOC, was appointed chair of both LOV and LOA. LOV was given the responsibility for operating the venues after the Olympics.

LOOC and the Ministry of Local Government and Regional Development started negotiations concerning the fund in October 1990. The government increased the fund size to NOK 130 million in January 1991, as well as allocating NOK 70 of the reserve funding to post-Olympic use. Lillehammer Municipality stated that they wanted a disproportionate share of the funding, but this was rejected by Minister Kjell Borgen. The fund would be insufficient, which caused a conflict between the five municipalities. Gjøvik and Hamar chose not to take an ownership stake in LOV as they did not want a Lillehammer-based company to manage the towns' main venues. At the same time, Lillehammer Municipality did not want the two other towns to own part of LOV, as they hoped the entire fund would be used to finance the five venues in Lillehammer. Gjøvik and Hamar took steps to create their own joint venture to operate their three arenas, while Borgen stated that all the venues should be allocated to one company. Ringebu Mayor Erik Winther stated that he felt that his municipality had been tricked into joining LOV and that they were not allowed to participate as an equal partner.

Haavind was replaced by Bjørn Sund in 1991. The post-use funds were distributed such that LOA received NOK 76 million. It also acquired a thirty-percent stake in Hamar Olympiske Anlegg, which operates Vikingskipet and Hamar Olympic Amphitheatre in Hamar, and Gjøvik Olympiske Anlegg, which operates Gjøvik Olympic Cavern Hall in Gjøvik. Lillehammer was the only of the five host municipalities to not use municipal grants to build their venues. By late 1991, LOOC desired a closer cooperation, resulting in a merger between LOA and Lillehammer '94 which took the latter's name. By 1 January 1993 also LOV and LOOC had also been merged to a single entity. Planning of post-Olympic use and demobilization started in early 1993.

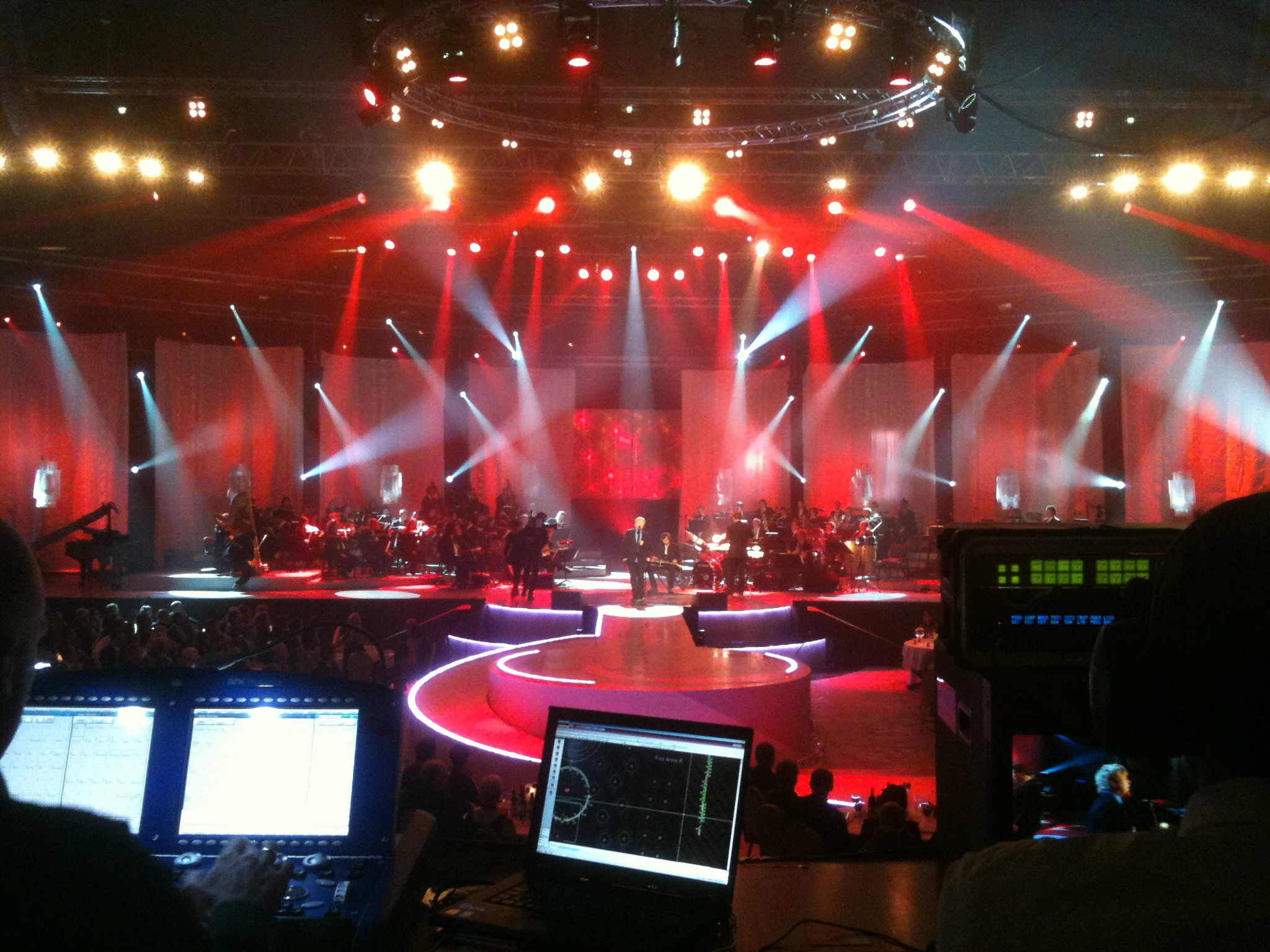
Kurt Nilsen performing at Håkons Hall during Idrettsgallaen 2010

LOOC transferred the ownership of the Olympic venues in Lillehammer to the municipality for NOK 1 million on 7 September 1993. By then the government had increased the post-Olympic fund to NOK 200 million. Ownership of the Hamar and Gjøvik venues had previously been transferred to the respective municipal governments. The fund was established in September and is managed by a separate foundation, Stiftelsen Lillehammer Etterbruksfond. Additional capital for the fund was secured through LOOC's financial buffers not being used and the surplus transferred to the funds. In June 1994 the fund was set to NOK 401.3 million.

Minister of Local Government and Regional Development, Gunnar Berge, stated in January 1995 that he was concerned that the post-Olympic use funds were being used up too quickly and that money was being used for unsuitable projects. However, he rejected that the state should take control over the venues or the money. After one year, Lillehammer Olympiapark had used NOK 32 of 146 million, while the company Olympia Utvikling/Troll Park had used NOK 14 of 95 million. For the Lillehammer companies, this meant that the fund was estimated to run out after ten instead of twenty years. In contrast, Hamar Olympiske Anlegg had only used the fund's yield. LOOC criticized the post-Olympic use companies, stating that they were too bureaucratic, that their combined 100 employees were too many, and that one or two companies would be sufficient.

By 1999, Lillehammer Olympiapark had an annual revenue of NOK 20 million, of which a third came from the fund. Commercial activities contributed half the revenue, while the remaining fraction came from sports activities. Between 80 and 90 percent of the rental time went to sports activities. A report published by Lillehammer University College in 2007 concluded that all the 260 permanent jobs created in the Lillehammer area as a result of the Olympics were directly dependent on subsidies from the post-Olympic use funds. In the late 2000s, Lillehammer Olympiapark was using between NOK 8 and 12 million per year. There was NOK 25 million left in the fund in 2012, which was scheduled to be closed in 2014, after it has served for 20 years. Lillehammer Olympiapark started planning the organization of the venues in 2010. The company recommended that the subsidies be equally funded between Lillehammer Municipality, Oppland County Municipality and the Ministry of Culture. Specifically it recommended that the state take over ownership of the bobsleigh and luge track, while the county took partial ownership of Lillehammer Olympiapark. The state would thus continue to finance the track, which is the only such venue in Northern Europe, while the municipality and county finance the other four venues. The venues are recommended held to such a standard that they can host world cup and world championships in relevant sports.

== Operations ==
As of 2010, the company had a revenue of NOK 56 million, up NOK 10 million from 2009, yielding a profit of NOK 2 million. The company employed between 51 and 55 people, it is based at Håkons Hall and is entirely owned by Lillehammer Municipality. The company's revenue comes from a series of sources, the most important being events and tourists. At Lysgårdsbakken, the company operates a chairlift and viewing platform at the top of the tower, as well as a downhill and bobsleigh simulator. The company tailors events to companies with various activities at the hill, including a ceremony to light to Olympic Flame. Kanthaugen and its lift is rented out for tobogganing. The sledding track serves groups and tourists with activities such as wheelbob and for-man bobsleigh with an authorized pilot, bobrafting, skeleton and skeleton rafting. Next to the track is an activity park with activities such as snowmobile and all-terrain vehicle tracks.

== Venues ==
=== Birkebeineren Ski Stadium ===
The arena covers an area of 200 hectares (490 acres), and is 3 kilometers (2 mi) from the town center. For the Olympics, 27 kilometers (17 mi) of cross-country tracks and 9 kilometers (6 mi) of biathlon tracks were built. There are two stadiums, one for cross-country skiing and one for biathlon. The former has a spectator capacity for 31,000, while the latter has a capacity for 13,500. Permanent buildings include a finishing house for biathlon, a finishing house for cross-country and a plant room. The cross-country stadium is 200 meters (660 ft) long, while the biathlon stadium is 150 meters (490 ft) long; the biathlon stadium has 30 shooting stations. As a recreational venue, Birkebeineren connects to 450 kilometers (280 mi) of skiing tracks, including a public 5-kilometer (3 mi) lighted track which is lit until 22:00 every day during winter. During the summer, the tracks are available for jogging, running, roller skiing and similar activities. The FIS Cross-Country World Cup has been hosted three times, in 1993, 2000 and 2002, all in February or March. The FIS Nordic Combined World Cup has been hosted seven times at the stadium, and the Biathlon World Cup four times, between 1993 and 1997.

=== Håkons Hall ===
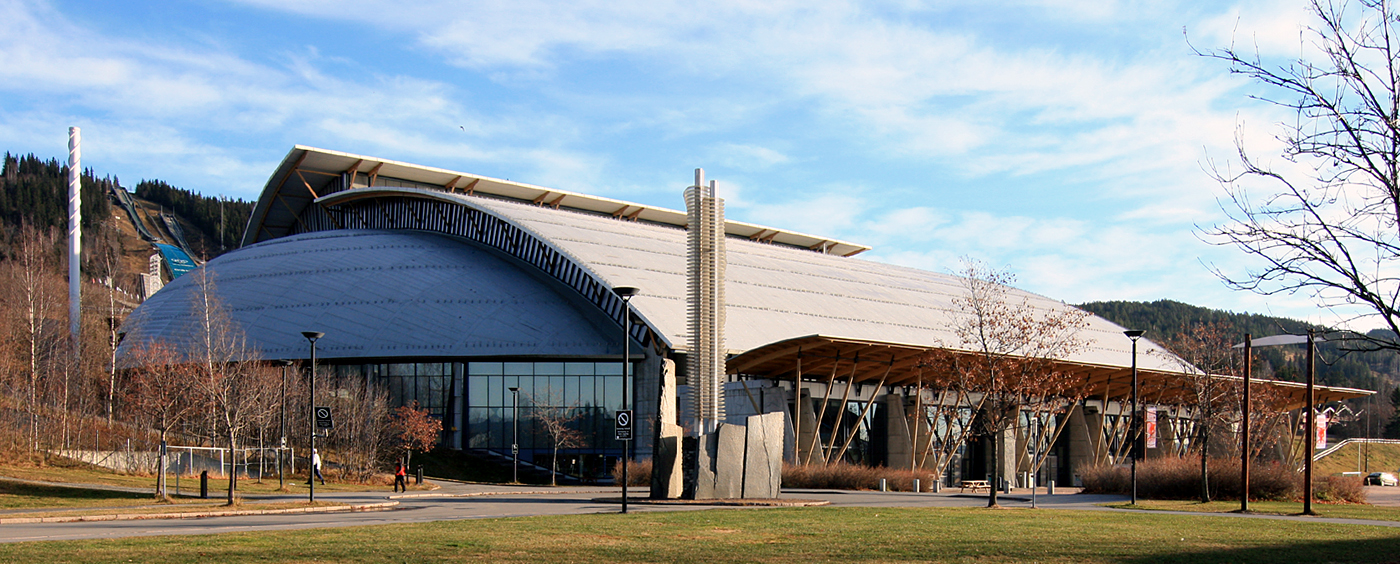
Håkons Hall

Håkons Hall is an arena which was used for ice hockey at the 1994 Winter Olympics. In the 1994 Winter Paralympics, Håkons Hall was used for the opening and closing ceremonies. The venue has a capacity for 11,500 seated spectators and is the largest handball and ice hockey venue in the country. The stands are flexible and telescopic, allowing for flexibility in hall use and seating capacity. The arena can be configured with a 330-square-meter (3,600 sq ft) stage. The hall can be set up to serve 2,000 people at a banquet, or divided up to serve smaller groups. The venue has among other events hosted the finals of the 1999 IIHF World Championship in ice hockey, the Junior Eurovision Song Contest 2004, 2008 European Men's Handball Championship, the 2010 European Women's Handball Championship and the World Women's Handball Championship in 1993 and 1999.

=== Lillehammer Olympic Bobsleigh and Luge Track ===
Lillehammer Olympic Bobsleigh and Luge Track is 1,710 meters (5,610 ft) long, with the competitive length for bobsleigh and men's singles in luge being 1,365 meters (4,478 ft) and for men's doubles and women's singles being 1,065 meters (3,494 ft). The track has 16 turns and contains 24 photocells for timekeeping. The track has a vertical drop of 112 meters (367 ft) for the entire course, with an average eight percent and maximum fifteen percent grade. The start is located at 384 meters (1,260 ft) above mean sea level. It allows for a maximum speed of 130 kilometres per hour (81 mph) and has a spectator capacity is 10,000. After the Olympics, the track has been used for the FIBT World Championships 1995 in skeleton and the FIL World Luge Championships 1995.

=== Kanthaugen Freestyle Arena ===
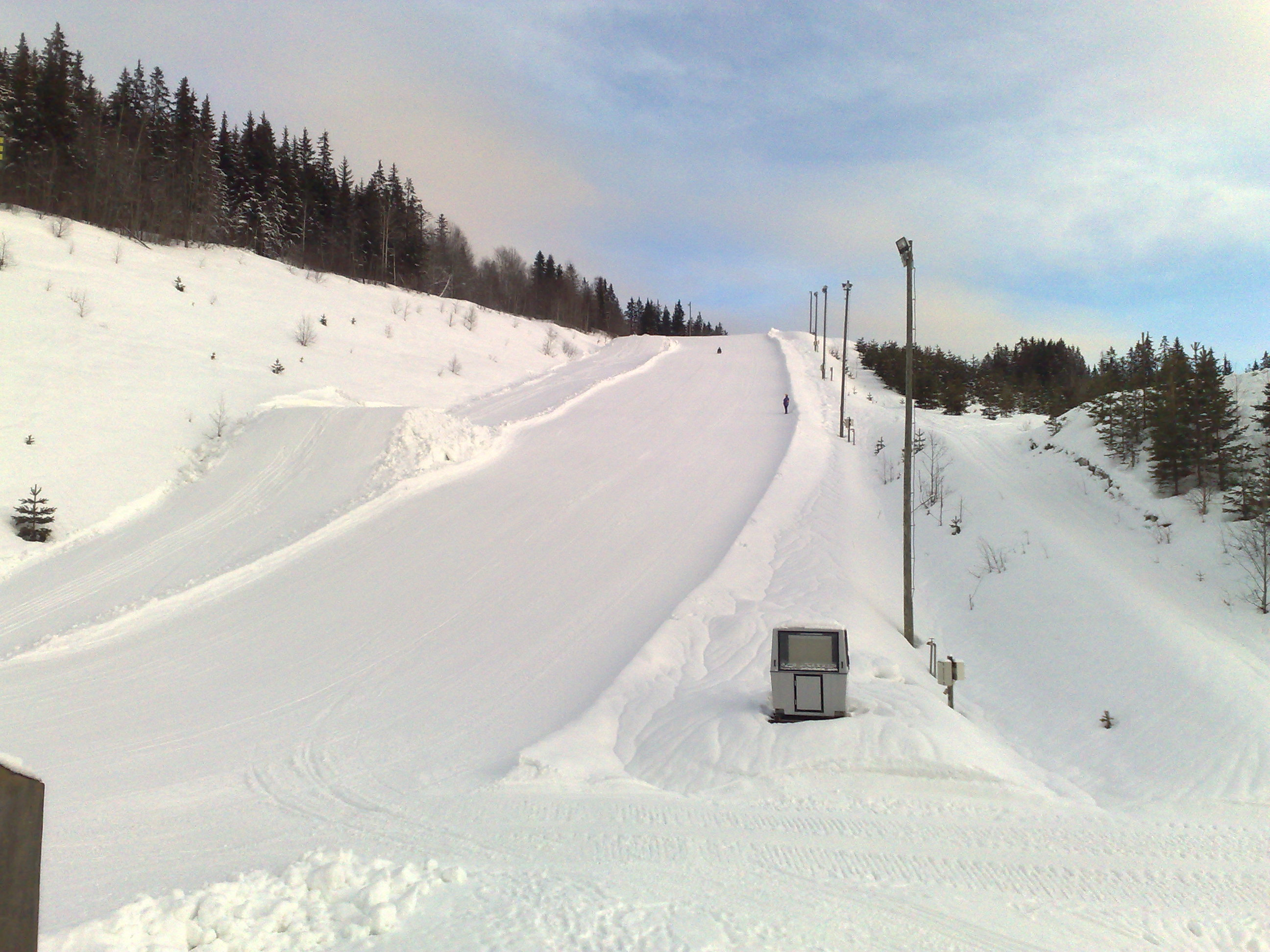
Kanthaugen Freestyle Arena

Kanthaugen is located next to Lysgårsbakken, slightly uphill from Stampesletta, one kilometer (half a mile) east of Lillehammer's town center. It consists of three hills, each tailor-made for aerials, moguls and ski ballet, respectively. Above the Olympic hills is a 1-kilometer (0.6 mi) long tobogganing hill which uses the competitive area as a finish. At the base of the hill is the spectator area, which featured temporary bleachers during the Olympics. The spectator capacity for aerials and ski ballet is 15,000, while it is 12,000 for moguls. Also at the foot of the hill is a jury tower overlooking the aerials hill. The venue is equipped with snowmaking equipment, a T-bar lift and floodlights. In addition to freestyle skiing at the 1994 Winter Olympics, it has hosted FIS Freestyle Skiing World Cup events twice, on 26 to 28 March 1993 and on 3 to 5 March 1995.

=== Lysgårdsbakken ===
The twin ski jumping hill consists of a large hill with a construction point (K-point) of 123 and a hill size (HS) of 138, and a normal hill has a K-point of 90 and a hill size of 100. The hill has a capacity for 35,000 spectators, of which 7,500 can be seated. In addition, up to 25,000 people can followed the games from free areas around the venue. Auxiliary structures include a start house, a judges tower—which includes office space for organizers and judges—a media building, and a technical room below the stands, as well as a first aid room and restrooms. It also features a high-pressure snow production facility with outtakes all along the approach and outrun. Transport to the large hill tower is accessible via a chair lift. Lysgårdsbakken is a regular site for FIS Ski Jumping World Cup and FIS Nordic Combined World Cup tournaments. FIS Ski Jumping World Cup has been hosted nearly every year since 1993. Since 2004, with the exception of 2007 and 2010, Lysgårdsbakken is a co-host of the Nordic Tournament. In 2005, the hills were the eleventh-most visited tourist attraction in Norway.
