= Nataliya Sherstneva =

Ukrainian freestyle skier

Personal information
- Nationality: Ukrainian
- Born: 3 March 1973 (age 52); Mykolaiv, Ukraine

Sport
- Country: Ukraine
- Sport: Freestyle skiing

Nataliya Sherstneva (born 3 March 1973) is a Ukrainian freestyle skier. She was born in Mykolaiv. She competed at the 1994 Winter Olympics in Lillehammer, where she placed fifth in women's aerials.
