= Inna Paliyenko =

Ukrainian freestyle skier

Personal information
- Nationality: Ukrainian
- Born: 8 June 1969 (age 55); Mykolaiv, Ukraine

Sport
- Country: Ukraine
- Sport: Freestyle skiing

Inna Paliyenko (born 8 June 1969) is a Ukrainian freestyle skier. She was born in Mykolaiv. She competed at the 1994 Winter Olympics, in women's aerials.
