= Yuliya Rakovich =

Belarusian freestyle skier

Personal information
- Born: 1 August 1974 (age 50); Minsk, Byelorussian SSR, Soviet Union

Sport
- Country: Belarus
- Sport: Freestyle skiing

Yuliya Rakovich (born 1 August 1974) is a Belarusian freestyle skier. She was born in Minsk. She competed at the 1994 Winter Olympics, in women's aerials.
