= FIS Freestyle World Ski Championships 1991 =

International skiing competition

The 1991 FIS Freestyle World Ski Championships were held between February 11th and February 17th in Lake Placid, New York. The World Championships featured both men's and women's events in the Moguls, Aerials, Acro Skiing and the Combined.

== Results ==
=== Men's results ===
==== Moguls ====
Medal	Name	Nation
1st place, gold medalist(s)	Edgar Grospiron	France
2nd place, silver medalist(s)	Bernard Brandt	Switzerland
3rd place, bronze medalist(s)	Chuck Martin	United States

==== Aerials ====
Medal	Name	Nation
1st place, gold medalist(s)	Philippe Laroche	Canada
2nd place, silver medalist(s)	John Ross	Canada
3rd place, bronze medalist(s)	Dave Valenti	United States

==== Acro Skiing ====
Medal	Name	Nation
1st place, gold medalist(s)	Lane Spina	United States
2nd place, silver medalist(s)	Roberto Franco	Italy
3rd place, bronze medalist(s)	Dave Walker	Canada

==== Combined ====
Medal	Name	Nation	Result
1st place, gold medalist(s)	Sergei Shupletsov	Soviet Union	41.00
2nd place, silver medalist(s)	Jeff Viola	Canada	53.00
3rd place, bronze medalist(s)	Youri Gilg	France	55.00

=== Women's results ===
==== Moguls ====
Medal	Name	Nation
1st place, gold medalist(s)	Donna Weinbrecht	United States
2nd place, silver medalist(s)	Tatjana Mittermayer	Germany
3rd place, bronze medalist(s)	Birgit Stein-Keppler	Germany

==== Aerials ====
Medal	Name	Nation
1st place, gold medalist(s)	Vasilisa Semenchuk	Soviet Union
2nd place, silver medalist(s)	Elfie Simchen	Germany
3rd place, bronze medalist(s)	Liselotte Johansson	Sweden

==== Acro Skiing ====
Medal	Name	Nation	Result
1st place, gold medalist(s)	Ellen Breen	United States	28.10
2nd place, silver medalist(s)	Jan Bucher	United States	27.69
3rd place, bronze medalist(s)	Cathy Fechoz	France	25.50

==== Combined ====
Medal	Name	Nation	Result
1st place, gold medalist(s)	Maja Schmid	Switzerland	41.00
2nd place, silver medalist(s)	Conny Kissling	Switzerland	42.00
3rd place, bronze medalist(s)	Kristean Porter	United States	43.00

== Medal table ==
Rank	Nation	Gold	Silver	Bronze	Total
1	United States	3	1	3	7
2	Soviet Union	2	0	0	2
3	Canada	1	2	1	4
4	Switzerland	1	2	0	3
5	France	1	0	2	3
6	Germany	0	2	1	3
7	Italy	0	1	0	1
8	Sweden	0	0	1	1
Totals (8 entries)		8	8	8	24
