= Tracy Evans =

American freestyle skier

Personal information
- Born: 8 December 1967 (age 58) Hornell, New York, United States

Sport
- Country: United States
- Sport: Freestyle skiing

Tracy Evans OLY (born 8 December 1967) is an American freestyle skier.

She was born in Hornell, New York. She competed at the 1994 Winter Olympics in Lillehammer, where she placed seventh in women's aerials. She also took part in the 1998 Winter Olympics in Nagano, and in the 2002 Winter Olympics in Salt Lake City. During the 2018 Winter Olympics, Evans was inducted into the Olympians for Life project for challenging gender stereotypes and the right to play.
