= Vasilisa Semenchuk =

Russian freestyle skier

Personal information
- Nationality: Russian
- Born: 1966 (age 59–60) Elista, Kalmykia, Soviet Union

Sport
- Country: Russia
- Sport: Freestyle skiing
Medal record
Women's freestyle skiing
Representing Soviet Union
World Championships
Gold medal – first place	1991 Lake Placid	Aerials

Vasilisa Vasiliyevna Semenchuk (Russian: Васили́са Васи́льевна Семе́нчук) (born 1966) is a Russian freestyle skier who competed for the Soviet Union.

She competed at the FIS Freestyle World Ski Championships 1989 in Oberjoch, where she placed fifth in combined, tenth in aerials, and also took part in ski ballet and moguls. She won a gold medal in aerials at the FIS Freestyle World Ski Championships 1991.
