= Liselotte Johansson =

Swedish freestyle skier (born 1970)

Personal information
- Born: 21 July 1970 (age 55) Berg Municipality, Sweden

Sport
- Country: Sweden
- Sport: Freestyle skiing

Liselotte Johansson (born 21 July 1970) is a Swedish freestyle skier. She was born in Berg Municipality. She competed at the 1994 Winter Olympics, in women's aerials, and also at the 1998 Winter Olympics and 2002 Winter Olympics.
