= Darcy Downs =

American freestyle skier

Personal information
- Born: August 26, 1968 (age 56); Canada

Sport
- Country: United States
- Sport: Freestyle skiing

Darcy Downs (born August 26, 1968) is a Canadian freestyle skier. A versatile skier, he was three-time second of the World Cup combined standings (1993, 1995 and 1997) and he won the overall title in 1997. He also stood out during the FIS Freestyle World Ski Championships: he won a silver medal in the combined at La Clusaz in 1995 and won gold two years later at Nagano.
