= Sergey Shupletsov =

Russian freestyle skier

Medal record

Men's freestyle skiing

Representing Russia

Olympic Games
Silver medal – second place	1994 Lillehammer	Moguls

FIS Freestyle World Ski Championships
Gold medal – first place	1993 Altenmarkt	Combined
Bronze medal – third place	1995 La Clusaz	Moguls

Representing Soviet Union

FIS Freestyle World Ski Championships
Gold medal – first place	1991 Lake Placid	Combined

Sergey Borisovich Shupletsov (Russian: Сергей Борисович Шуплецов; April 25, 1970 in Chusovoy – July 14, 1995 in La Clusaz) was a Russian freestyle skier and Olympic medalist. He received a silver medal at the 1994 Winter Olympics in Lillehammer, in moguls. Jean-Luc Brassard won gold, and Edgar Grospiron got bronze.

In 1995, Shupletsov won the World Cup tour in Moguls. That year he had six World Cup wins (including winning five in a row) and placed 2nd three times. He died shortly afterward, on July 14, 1995, in a motorcycle accident.

He competed in 102 World Cups and was on the podium 32 times with 12 victories.
