= Olivier Cotte (skier) =

French freestyle skier

Personal information
- Nationality: French
- Born: 10 September 1972 (age 52); Voiron, France

Sport
- Sport: Freestyle skiing

Olivier Cotte (born 10 September 1972) is a French former freestyle skier. He competed at the 1994 Winter Olympics and the 1998 Winter Olympics.
