= Le Relais =

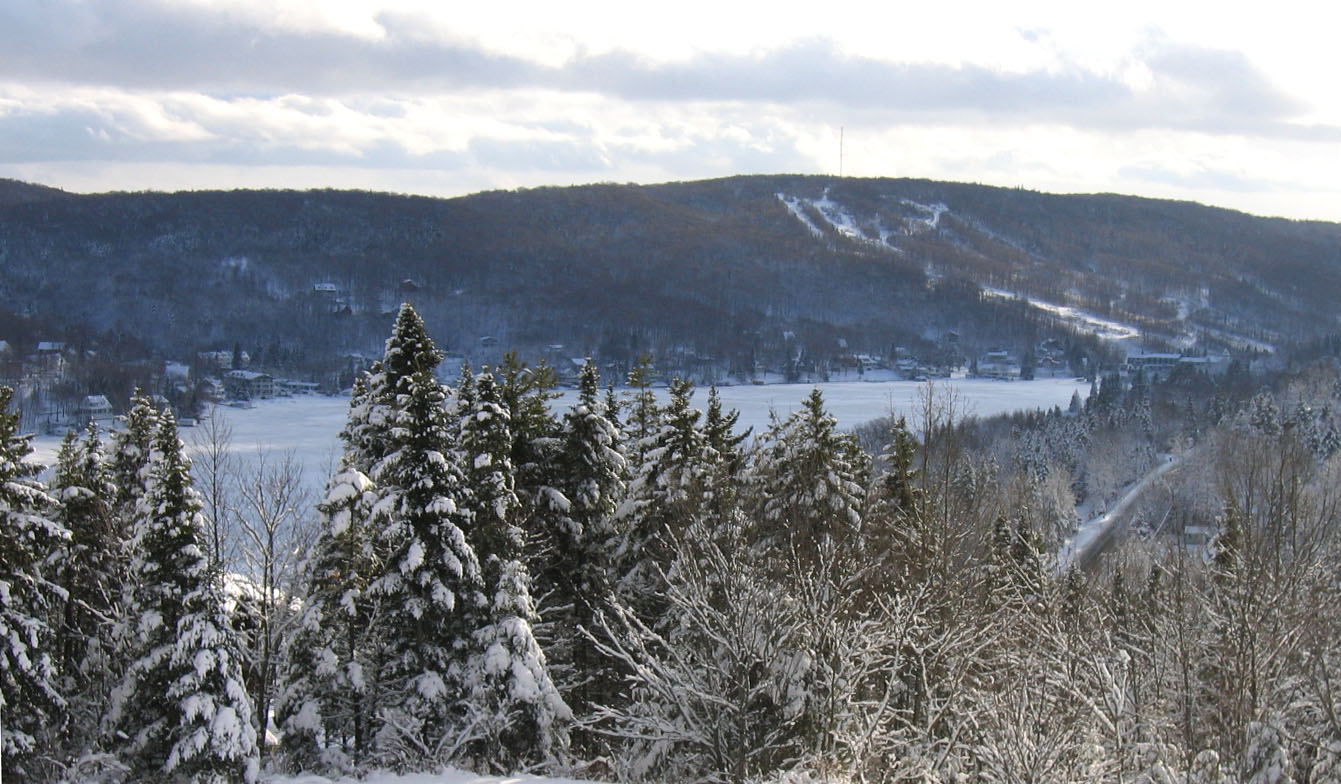
- Lac-Beauport with the ski mountain in the background
- Interactive map of Le Relais
- Location: Lac-Beauport, Quebec, Canada
- Nearest city: Quebec City, 11 km (6.8 mi)
- Coordinates: 46°56′13″N 71°17′51″W
- Vertical: 224 m (735 ft)
- Top elevation: 429 m (1,407 ft)
- Base elevation: 205 m (673 ft)
- Skiable area: 173 acres (70 ha)
- Trails: 27 total 22% Easy; 23% Intermediate; 55% Difficult
- Longest run: 2.05 km (1.27 mi)
- Lift system: 7 total 1 detachable six pack 1 detachable quad 2 magic carpets 1 handle tow 2 Poma platter lifts
- Lift capacity: 8,260 skiers/hr
- Snowfall: 342 cm (135 in)
- Snowmaking: 100%
- Night skiing: 100%
- Website: Le Relais

Le Relais is a ski mountain located near downtown Quebec City, Canada. Smallest of the four local ski stations. ( Mont Sainte-Anne, Stoneham and Le Massif.)

== Description ==
Located in Lac-Beauport, Le Relais - (founded 1936) has a long history within the Quebec Community. Located onsite are a total of 27 trails, ranging from beginner to difficult. All trails are fully lit to allow for night skiing.

Le Relais is the home of the "Centre national acrobatique Yves Laroche" (CNAYL), an aerial skiing center. The CNAYL has available a water ramp making summer training possible.

In summer, Le Relais becomes an "adventure center", providing five high rope courses, better known locally as "arbre en arbre".

== History ==
Le Relais was founded 1936, however its concept was initially deliberated over during the 1933-1934 winter. Initially suggested locations for the ski center include the (Plains of Abraham) however Herman "Jackrabbit" Smith-Johannsen, proposed another location : The Murphy mountain.

The mountain of the actual site of Le Relais was originally purchased for the price of $1000. Another $8500 was then raised to build a small lodge at the bottom of the mountain.

Le Relais is known locally as the birthplace of skiing in Quebec City.

== See also ==
- Mont-Sainte-Anne
- Stoneham
- List of ski areas and resorts in Canada
