= Sharon Petzold =

American freestyle skier (born 1971)

Personal information
- Nationality: American
- Born: 10 October 1971 (age 54)

Sport
- Country: United States
- Sport: Freestyle skiing
Medal record
Women's freestyle skiing
Representing United States
World Championships
| Silver medal – second place | 1993 Altenmarkt-Zauchensee | Ski ballet |

Sharon Petzold (born 10 October 1971) is an American freestyle skier.

She competed at the FIS Freestyle World Ski Championships 1991 in Lake Placid, where she placed fifteenth in acroski (ski ballet). She won a silver medal in ski ballet at the FIS Freestyle World Ski Championships 1993 in Altenmarkt-Zauchensee.

She took part in the 1992 Winter Olympics in Albertville, where ski ballet was a demonstration event.
