= Piancavallo =

Ski resort in Aviano, Italy

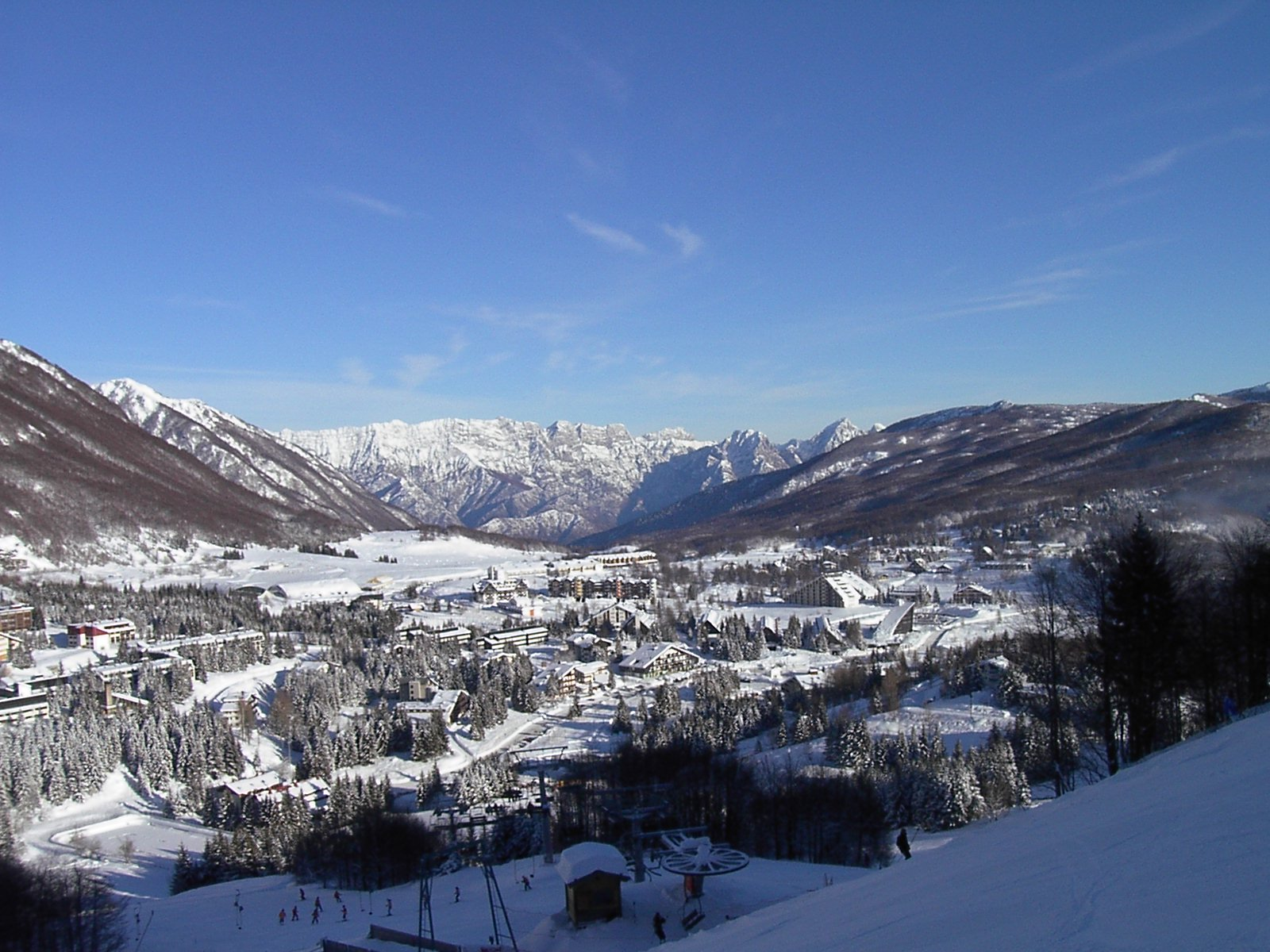
- Piancavallo in winter.

- Location in Italy
- Location: Dolomites, Italy
- Nearest city: Pordenone
- Coordinates: 46°5′19″N 12°35′44″E
- Vertical: 971 m (3,186 ft)
- Top elevation: 2,251 m (7,385 ft)
- Base elevation: 1,280 m (4,199 ft)
- Trails: 18

Piancavallo (Friulian: Plancjaval) is a ski resort in the Dolomites of northern Italy. It is a frazione of the comune of Aviano, in the province of Pordenone in Friuli-Venezia Giulia.

Piancavallo is situated at 1,280 metres (4,199 ft) above sea level, at the foot of Monte Cavallo (2,251 m (7,385 ft)). The nearest railway station is that of Aviano, to which it is connected by regular bus services.

== History ==
Piancavallo was created in the late 1960s, and was the first Italian ski resort with snowmaking facilities. Since the 1980s it has hosted several women's alpine skiing events in the World Cup, and a stage of the Giro d'Italia cycling race.

== Winter ==
There are 24 km (15 mi) of alpine ski runs and 26 km (16 mi) of cross-country ski trails, 1.2 km (0.75 mi) of which are illuminated. There is an Ice Palace for hockey and ice skating, a roller coaster in the snow, and a snow park for children, Nevelandia, with inflatable castles and snowtubing.
