= Elfie Simchen =

German freestyle skier

Personal information
- Nationality: German
- Born: 11 July 1967 (age 58) Ludwigsburg, Germany

Sport
- Country: Germany
- Sport: Freestyle skiing
Medal record
Women's freestyle skiing
Representing Germany
World Championships
Silver medal – second place	1991 Lake Placid	Aerials

Elfie Simchen (born 11 July 1967) is a German freestyle skier. She was born in Ludwigsburg. She competed at the 1994 Winter Olympics in Lillehammer, in women's aerials. She won a silver medal in women's aerials at the FIS Freestyle World Ski Championships 1991.
