= Cathy Féchoz =

French freestyle skier (born 1969)

Personal information
- Nationality: French
- Born: 23 May 1969 (age 57) Moûtiers, Savoie, France

Sport
- Country: France
- Sport: Freestyle skiing
Medal record
Women's freestyle skiing
Representing France
World Championships
Bronze medal – third place	1991 Lake Placid	Ski ballet
Bronze medal – third place	1993 Altenmarkt-Zauchensee	Ski ballet

Cathy Féchoz (born 23 May 1969 in Moûtiers) is a French freestyle skier.

She competed at the FIS Freestyle World Ski Championships 1991, where she won a bronze medal in acroski (ski ballet). She won a second bronze medal in ski ballet at the FIS Freestyle World Ski Championships 1991 in Altenmarkt-Zauchensee.

She took part at the 1992 Winter Olympics in Albertville, placing second in the ski ballet, which was a demonstration event at the games.

== Awards ==
=== Winter Olympics ===
- 1992 Winter Olympics in Albertville ( France ):
  - Silver medal in ski ballet ( demonstration sport )

=== Freestyle Skiing World Championships ===
- 1991 World Freestyle Skiing Championships in Lake Placid ( USA ):
  - Bronze medal in ski ballet.
- 1993 Freestyle Skiing World Championships in Altenmarkt-Zauchensee ( Austria ):
  - Bronze medal in ski ballet.

=== Freestyle Skiing World Cup ===
- Best overall ranking: 9th in 1994 ^{.}
- Ski ballet ranking: ^{3rd} in 1992, 1994 and 1995.
- 25 podiums including 6 victories in World Cup events.
