= Jörgen Pääjärvi =

Swedish freestyle skier (born 1969)

Personal information
- Nationality: Swedish
- Born: 10 March 1969 (age 57) Malmberget, Sweden

Sport
- Sport: Freestyle skiing

Jörgen Pääjärvi (born 10 March 1969) is a Swedish freestyle skier. He competed at the 1992 Winter Olympics and the 1994 Winter Olympics.
