= Caroline Olivier =

Canadian freestyle skier

Personal information
- Nationality: Canadian
- Born: 22 December 1971 (age 53) Quebec

Sport
- Sport: Freestyle skiing

Caroline Olivier (born 22 December 1971) is a Canadian freestyle skier. She was born in Quebec. She competed at the 1994 Winter Olympics in Lillehammer, where she placed 8th in aerials. She also competed at the 1998 Winter Olympics in Nagano.
