= Andreas Schönbächler =

Swiss freestyle skier

Medal record

Representing Switzerland

Men's freestyle skiing

Olympic Games
Gold medal – first place	1994 Lillehammer	Aerials

Andreas Schönbächler (born 24 April 1966) is a Swiss freestyle skier and Olympic champion. He won a gold medal at the 1994 Winter Olympics in Lillehammer.
