= Edgar Grospiron =

French freestyle skier (born 1969)

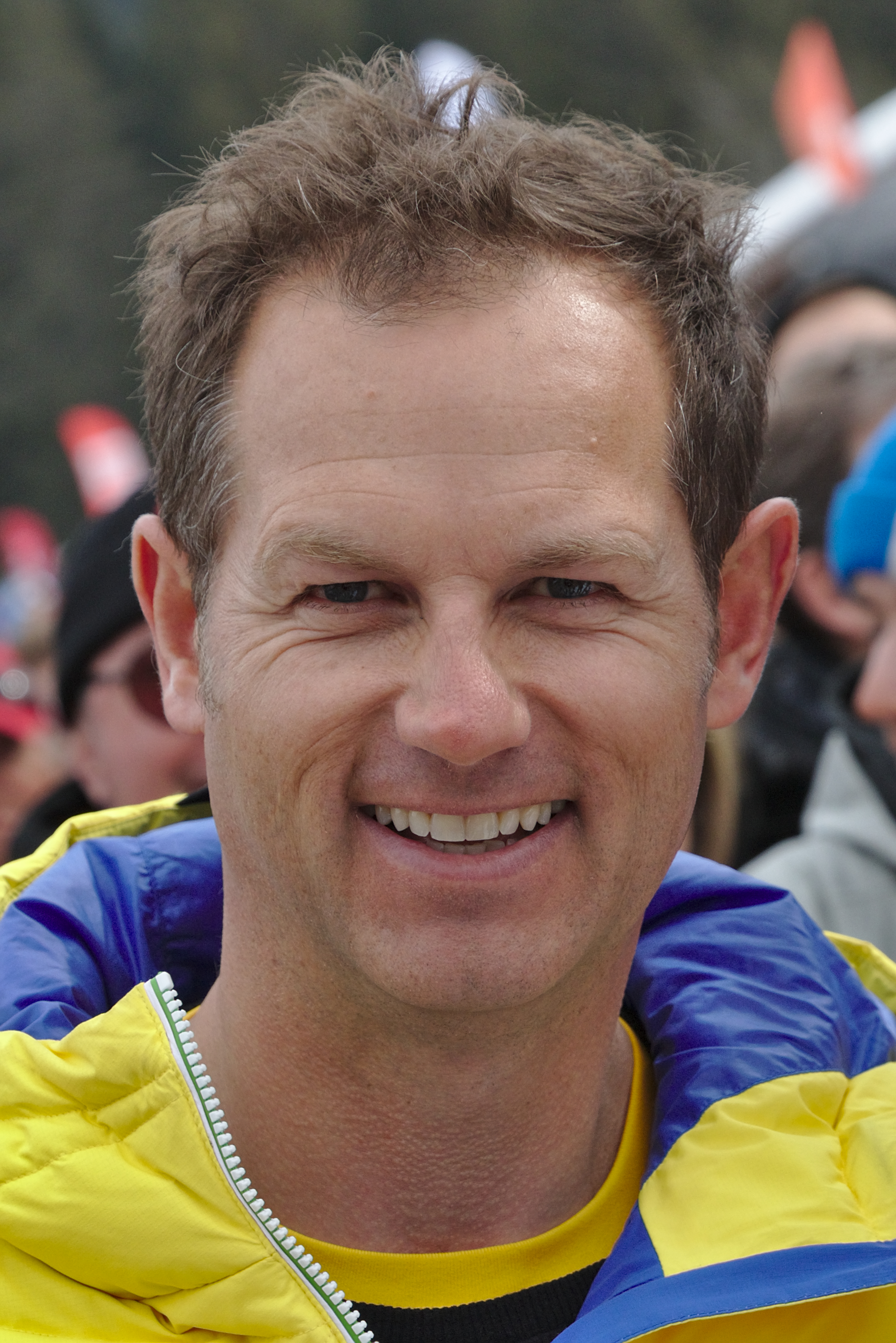
- Grospiron in 2015

Medal record

Men's freestyle skiing

Representing France

Olympic Games
Gold medal – first place	1992 Albertville	Moguls
Bronze medal – third place	1994 Lillehammer	Moguls

FIS Freestyle World Ski Championships
Gold medal – first place	1989 Oberjoch	Moguls
Gold medal – first place	1991 Lake Placid	Moguls
Gold medal – first place	1995 La Clusaz	Moguls

Edgar Grospiron

President of the Alpes Organising Committee for the 2030 Olympic and Paralympic Winter Games
- Incumbent
- Assumed office 15 March 2026
- Leader: Kirsty Coventry
- Preceded by: Giovanni Malagò (Milano Cortina 2026)
- Succeeded by: Fraser Bullock (Utah 2034)

Chair of the Alpes Organising Committee for the 2030 Olympic and Paralympic Winter Games
- Incumbent
- Assumed office 18 February 2025
- Preceded by: Position established

Personal details
- Born: 17 March 1969 (age 57) Lélex, Ain, France

Edgar Grospiron (French pronunciation: [ɛdɡaʁ ɡʁospiʁɔ̃]; born 17 March 1969) is a French freestyle skier and Olympic champion. He won a gold medal at the 1992 Winter Olympics in Albertville. He received a bronze medal at the 1994 Winter Olympics in Lillehammer. At the 2012 Winter Youth Olympics he was Chef de mission for the French Team. He was in charge of the Annecy bid for the 2018 Winter Olympics. This bid secured seven votes, behind Munich with 25 and the winner Pyeongchang with 63 votes. Grospiron serves as the president of the organizing committee for the 2030 Winter Olympics in the French Alps. The organising committee has been plagued with infighting, with the Games' director general, chief operating officer, communications director, and chief of the remuneration committee resigning between 2025 and 2026.

Sporting positions
Preceded by (Italy) Giovanni Malagò	President of Organizing Committee for Winter Olympic Games; 2030	Succeeded by (United States) Fraser Bullock
