= Maja Schmid =

Swiss freestyle skier

Personal information
- Nationality: Swiss
- Born: 11 September 1967 (age 58)

Sport
- Country: Switzerland
- Sport: Freestyle skiing
Medal record
Women's freestyle skiing
Representing Switzerland
World Championships
Gold medal – first place	1991 Lake Placid	Combined
Silver medal – second place	1995 La Clusaz	Combined

Maja Schmid (born 11 September 1967) is a Swiss freestyle skier. She competed at the 1994 Winter Olympics in Lillehammer, where she placed fourth in women's aerials. She won a gold medal in women's combined at the FIS Freestyle World Ski Championships 1991.
