= Philippe LaRoche =

Canadian freestyle skier

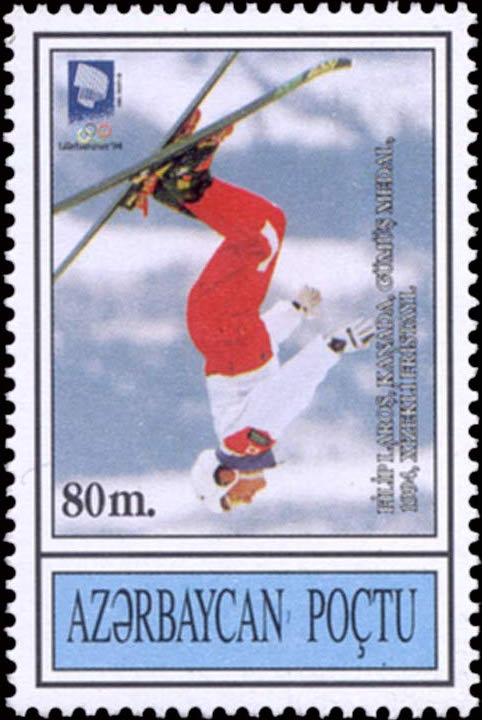
- Philippe LaRoche on stamp of Azerbaijan

Medal record

Men's freestyle skiing

Representing Canada

Olympic Games
Silver medal – second place	1994 Lillehammer	Aerials

FIS Freestyle World Ski Championships
Gold medal – first place	1991 Lake Placid	Aerials
Gold medal – first place	1993 Altenmarkt	Aerials
Bronze medal – third place	1989 Oberjoch	Aerials

Philippe LaRoche (born December 12, 1966) is a Canadian freestyle skier and Olympic medalist. He received a silver medal at the 1994 Winter Olympics in Lillehammer, in aerials.

He finished first in the aerials (demonstration event) at the 1992 Winter Olympics in Albertville.

He was born and grew up in Lac-Beauport, Quebec, Canada.
