= Ellen Breen =

American freestyle skier

Personal information
- Nationality: American
- Born: 17 April 1963 (age 63)

Sport
- Country: United States
- Sport: Freestyle skiing
Medal record
Women's freestyle skiing
Representing United States
World Championships
Gold medal – first place	1991 Lake Placid	Ski ballet
Gold medal – first place	1993 Altenmarkt-Zauchensee	Ski ballet
Silver medal – second place	1995 La Clusaz	Ski ballet

Ellen Breen (born 17 April 1963) is an American freestyle skier and world champion.

She competed at the FIS Freestyle World Ski Championships 1986 in Tignes, where she placed fifth in acroski (ski ballet). She won a gold medal in ski ballet at the FIS Freestyle World Ski Championships 1991 in Lake Placid. She won a second gold medal in ski ballet at the FIS Freestyle World Ski Championships 1993 in Altenmarkt-Zauchensee. At the FIS Freestyle World Ski Championships 1995 in La Clusaz she won a silver medal.

She took part at the 1992 Winter Olympics in Albertville, where ski ballet was a demonstration event.
