= Nataliya Orekhova =

Russian freestyle skier

Personal information
- Born: 28 September 1972 (age 52); Moscow, Russian SFSR, Soviet Union

Sport
- Country: Russia
- Sport: Freestyle skiing

Nataliya Orekhova (born 28 September 1972) is a Russian freestyle skier. She was born in Moscow. She competed at the 1994, 1998, and 2002 Winter Olympics; in 2002 she placed seventh in women's aerials.
