= Jean-Luc Brassard =

Canadian freestyle skier

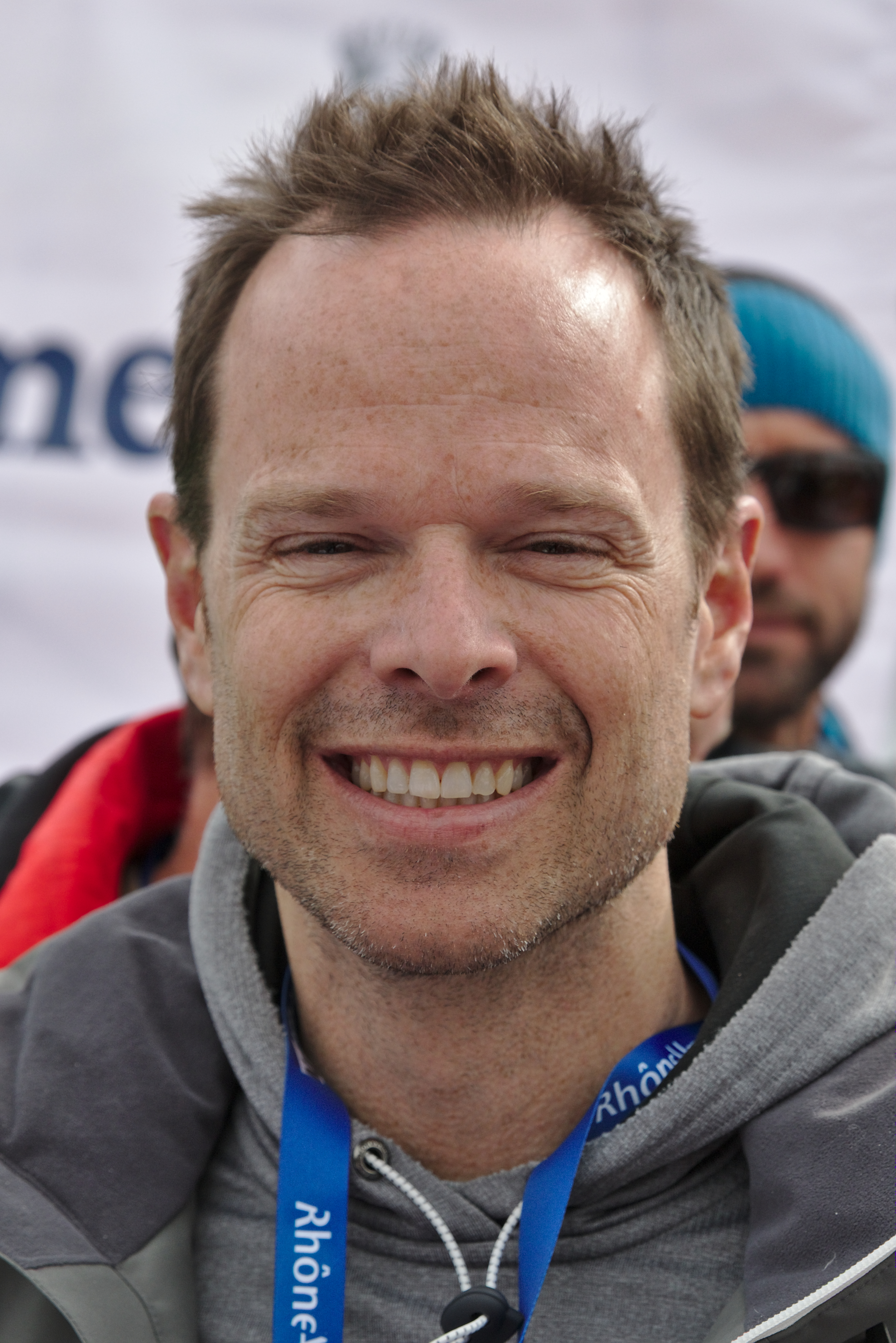

Personal information
- Born: August 24, 1972 (age 53) Salaberry-de-Valleyfield, Quebec, Canada

Sport
- Country: Canada
- Sport: Freestyle skiing
Medal record
Men's Freestyle skiing
Representing Canada
Olympic Games
Gold medal – first place	1994 Lillehammer	Moguls
FIS Freestyle World Ski Championships
Gold medal – first place	1993 Altenmarkt	Moguls
Gold medal – first place	1997 Iizuna Kogen	Moguls
Silver medal – second place	1995 La Clusaz	Moguls

Jean-Luc Brassard (born August 24, 1972) is a Canadian freestyle skier who won the gold medal at the 1994 Winter Olympics. Brassard has been credited with popularizing the wearing of bright knee pads to show off absorption and leg position for mogul skiers to best show judges how smoothly the athlete is taking the turns. He was born in Salaberry-de-Valleyfield, Quebec. In his other Olympic appearances, Brassard placed 7th in 1992, 4th in 1998 and 21st in 2002.

In 2005 he became the spokesman of Le Massif.

In 2010, Brassard was inducted into Canada's Sports Hall of Fame. In 2012, he was inducted into the Canadian Olympic Hall of Fame.

Brassard served as an assistant chef de mission for Canada at the 2014 Winter Olympics.

In late 2014, the Canadian Olympic Committee (COC) appointed Brassard as chef de mission for Canada at the 2016 Summer Olympics. In October 2015, following the resignation of COC President Marcel Aubut over multiple allegations of sexual harassment of staff, Brassard became vocal about the COC's failure to properly examine the issue when allegations were made in 2008. In April 2016, Brassard resigned as chef de mission, later replaced by Curt Harnett.

Brassard is currently a radio commentator and also the narrator of the French version of the television documentary program How It's Made.
