= Lina Cheryazova =

Uzbekistani freestyle skier (1968–2019)

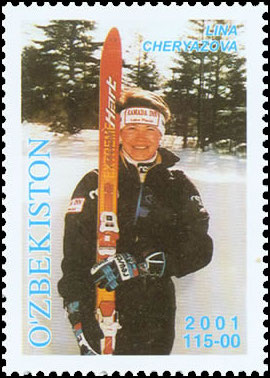
- Cheryazova on a 2001 stamp of Uzbekistan

Personal information
- Born: 1 November 1968 Tashkent, Uzbek SSR, Soviet Union
- Died: 23 March 2019 (aged 50) Novosibirsk, Russia
- Height: 164 cm (5 ft 5 in)
- Weight: 60 kg (132 lb)

Sport
- Sport: Freestyle skiing
- Coached by: Dmitri Kavunov
Medal record
Representing Uzbekistan
Olympic Games
Gold medal – first place	1994 Lillehammer	Aerials
FIS Freestyle World Ski Championships
Gold medal – first place	1993 Altenmarkt	Aerials

Lina Anatolyevna Cheryazova (Russian: Лина Анатольевна Черязова; 1 November 1968 – 23 March 2019) was an Uzbek freestyle skier who competed in aerials. She won a bronze medal at the 1990 European Championship and a gold medal at the 1993 World Championships before winning the gold medal at the 1994 Winter Olympics with a score of 166.84. As of the 2026 Winter Olympics, she is the only athlete to have won a Winter Olympic medal while representing Uzbekistan. Her achievements earned her the title of Honored Athlete of the Republic of Uzbekistan.

Cheryazova initially trained in gymnastics and trampolining, and took up freestyle skiing in 1987. She debuted at the World Cup in December 1989, and became the overall winner in the 1992–93 (winning six out of eight races) and 1993–94 seasons (winning six out of 11 races). In the summer of 1994, Cheryazova fractured her skull while training, and spent more than a month in a coma. She resumed competing in the autumn of 1995, but never regained her previous form. She retired after another injury sustained after the 1998 Olympics. In 1999 she moved to Novosibirsk, Russia, where she lived with her adopted daughter Alina.

Cheryazova died on 23 March 2019, following a lengthy illness. She was 50.
