= Stine Lise Hattestad =

Norwegian freestyle skier

Medal record

Women's freestyle skiing

Representing Norway

Olympic Games
Gold medal – first place	1994 Lillehammer	Moguls
Bronze medal – third place	1992 Albertville	Moguls

FIS Freestyle World Ski Championships
Gold medal – first place	1993 Altenmarkt	Moguls

Stine Lise Hattestad Bratsberg (born 30 April 1966) is a former Norwegian freestyle skier. She won an Olympic gold medal in the 1994 Olympics on Lillehammer and bronze from the Albertville Olympics. She also won the overall World Cup in 1988 and 1993.
