= 1998 Australia Day Honours =

The 1998 Australia Day Honours are appointments to various orders and honours to recognise and reward good works by Australian citizens. The list was announced on 26 January 1998 by the Governor General of Australia, Sir William Deane.

The Australia Day Honours are the first of the two major annual honours lists, the first announced to coincide with Australia Day (26 January), with the other being the Queen's Birthday Honours, which are announced on the second Monday in June.

== Order of Australia ==
=== Companion (AC) ===
==== General Division ====
Recipient	Citation	Notes
The Honourable Chief Justice Michael Eric John Black	For service to the law, to the legal profession and to the judiciary, particularly as Chief Justice of the Federal Court of Australia through enhancing the quality of judicial services provided to the community in the resolution of disputes	
Major General William Brian James, AO MBE MC	For service to the welfare of veterans and service people, particularly as National President of the Returned and Services League of Australia through leadership and advocacy in the areas of health prevention, medication usage and community	
Professor Sir Robert McCredie May	For service to science and scientific research, particularly in the area of biological conservation involving the interaction between population, resources and the environment, to scholarship and to the formulation of science policy	
The Very Reverend Dr James Frederick McKay, CMG OBE	For service to the spiritual and physical wellbeing of the people of outback Australia through innovation and initiative in pioneering the best possible health care and educational services in remote areas	
The Honourable Chief Justice John Harber Phillips	For service to the law, the administration of justice, law reform and education as Chief Justice of the Supreme Court of Victoria, and for his contributions to literature, the visual arts and the community	
Professor Grant Robert Sutherland	For service to science in the field of human genetics research and to the human genome project and, in particular, for his contribution to the discovery of the importance of 'fragile chromosomes' in the field of inherited diseases	

=== Officer (AO) ===
==== General Division ====
Recipient	Citation	Notes
Donald Robert Argus	For service to banking and finance, particularly as managing director and chief executive officer of the National Australia Bank Ltd and for his contributions as a member and supporter of a wide range of community and sporting organisations	
Douglass Ingham Aspinall, OAM RFD ED	For service to primary industry, in particular, the merino sheep breeding industry, to ex-service organisations and to the community	
Richard Lawrence Crosbie	For service to business and finance, particularly through the credit union movement since 1975, and as chairman of the Credit Union Services Corporation (Australia) Limited	
Judith Jane Perry Dunster	For service to the community in the field of aged care as the founder and developer of the Abbeyfield Society (Australia) Limited in creating a new concept of community housing for older people	
Slim Dusty, MBE	For service to Australian country music and to the entertainment industry as a composer and performer	
Donald George Fry	For service to engineering, in particular, marine engineering in the areas of design and construction, and to the community	
Professor John Watson Funder	For service to medicine, particularly in the field of endocrinology research, and in the development of public policy across a range of primary health issues	
Professor Frederick George Hilmer	For service to management education, competition policy, and workplace reform	
Dr Cherrell Hirst	For service to education as Chancellor of the Queensland University of Technology, and to medicine, in particular women's health through the promotion of mammographic screening for the early detection of breast cancer	
Clifford Frederick Hughes	For service to medicine, in particular as a cardiac surgeon, to international relations, and to the community	
Warwick Gordon Kent	For service to commerce at state, national and international levels as deputy chairman and managing director of the Bank of Western Australia Ltd (Bank West), and to community organisations	
Glen William Kinross	For service to community development programs and to improving international relations as an executive member of Rotary International in Australia and as the elected International President 1997-1998	
Commissioner Michael John Palmer, APM	For service to advancing the professionalisation of policing through the introduction of far-reaching anti-corruption processes and management practice reform	
Dr John Robert Philip	For service to the science of hydrology, to scientific communication in promoting the interests of science for the community, and the Australian culture through architecture and literature	
Professor Rudolf George Herman Prince	For service to the discipline of chemical engineering, both academically and professionally, to tertiary education and to the community	
David William Rogers	For service to tertiary education as the chancellor of Monash University, to the gas and petroleum industry, and to the community	
Richard Vincent Ryan, AM	For service to the Aboriginal community of the Northern Territory through the promotion of education, employment, health and tourism programs	
Dr Rodney Frederick Marsden Seaborn, OBE	For service to the performing arts through the establishment of the Seaborn, Broughton and Walford Foundation offering philanthropic support to rejuvenate old theatre facilities to continue the development of Australian drama and theatre	
His Excellency Richard Campbell Smith	For service to international relations and to the development of policy approaches to sanctions, human rights, defence and trade issues	
Geoffrey Bernard White	For service to the business community in the areas of civil engineering, construction and mining, and to the advancement of the thoroughbred racing industry	
Professor Kenneth William Wiltshire	For service in the field of social sciences, especially public administration through the formulation of public policy advice and for his contribution to UNESCO in all its fields	

==== Military Division ====
Branch	Recipient	Citation	Notes
Army	Major General James Paul Stevens	For distinguished service to the Australian Army in the fields of training and personnel management, particularly as the chief of the General Staff – Personnel	

=== Member (AM) ===
==== General Division ====
Recipient	Citation	Notes
Dr Bruce Konrad Armstrong	For service to medicine through research into cancer epidemiology	
Frances Anne Atkinson	For service to geology through pioneering field work on the origin of the Undara Volcanic System in North Queensland, for bringing national and international attention to these unique natural features, and for her sustained efforts towards establishing their effective protection	
Peter Hamilton Bailey, OBE	For service to the law, particularly as an advocate and educator in the area of human rights at national and international levels, and to the community	
Phillip Norman Bates	For service to cycling through the promotion and conduct of cycling events, and to the community	
Miriam-Rose Ungunmerr Baumann	For service to the community of Nauiyu Nambiyu in the Northern Territory, particularly through the promotion of Aboriginal education and Aboriginal art	
Hugh Sandford Beggs	For service to the Australian wool industry	
Dr John Barton Best	For service to the development of quality assurance in health care in Australia, particularly through the creation of the Peer Review Resource Centre and as Foundation Editor of the Journal, Australian Clinical Review	
Leonard Francis Bleasel	For service to the Australian gas and energy industries, and to the community	
Emeritus Professor Barry Boettcher	For service to biological science and education, particularly as Foundation Professor, Department of Biological Sciences, University of Newcastle, and to reproductive immunology	
Anthony Peter Boultbee, DFC	For service to the agricultural and livestock industries, in particular through the Pastoralists and Graziers Association of Western Australia	
Diana Mildred Bowman	For service to education, in particular to the education of young women, the professional development of School Principals, and to education management	
Dr Stephen Vickers Boyden	For service to science through the development of ideas and scholarship in the discipline of human ecology	
Keith Arthur Bradley	For service to the community, particularly through the ACT Division of the National Heart Foundation, to athletics, and to the Angelman Syndrome Association	
Dr Thomas Christopher Kenneth Brown	For service to the furniture industry	
Alan Gordon John Brown	For service to the forestry industry, particularly through research into tree breeding, and the development of plantation forestry in Australia	
Nicholas Burton Taylor	For service to business through the accountancy profession, and to the rural community	
Kevin Victor Campbell	For service to charitable organisations, particularly through the TVW Channel 7 Telethon Trust, to television administration, and to the community	
The Honourable Jennifer Lilian Cashmore	For service to the community, particularly in the areas of palliative care, women's issues, and economic development, and to the South Australian Parliament	
Professor Thomas Carrick Chambers	For service to the science of botany and its application to horticulture as director of the Royal Botanic Gardens, Sydney, and as a teacher and researcher on conservation issues and botanical concepts	
Sister Juliana Coulson	For service to community health and to hospital administration as a senior administrator and Director of Calvary Hospital, Hobart	
Dr Robert John Coulthard	For service to the Lions 'Sight First' Foundation both in Australia and internationally since 1965	
David Bruce Cowan	For service to the community, and to Parliament at Federal, State and Local levels	
Donald George Croot	For service to rowing as President of the Balmain Rowing Club for 16 years, Chairman and Deputy Chairman of the NSW Rowing Association for eight years, and Australian Team Manager for five world rowing events including the 1984 Olympic Games	
Professor William James Cumming	For service to medicine, particularly through the teaching and practice of orthopaedic surgery in Australia, and through the Orthopaedic Training Scheme in Indonesia and Pacific countries	
Gregory James Daniel	For service to the community through arts organisations and charities, and for his contribution towards the successful bid for the Sydney Olympic Games	
John Popham Deshon	For service to the community, in particular by addressing architectural design and construction requirements for people with disabilities	
John Anthony Desmarchelier, ED	For service to the sugar industry, particularly in the areas of development, trade and industrial relations, and to the community	
Associate Professor John Malcolm Duggan	For service to medicine, particularly in the field of gastroenterology, and to the community in the Hunter Valley	
Professor Terence Dwyer	For service to medicine in the fields of public health and epidemiology	
Dr William Sydney Egerton	For service to medicine as a vascular surgeon and as a medical educator	
Dr Peter Mervyn Elliott	For service to women's health, particularly in the fields of obstetrics, gynaecology and gynaecological oncology in Australia and overseas	
Dr Harold Robert Elphick, CBE	For service to medicine, particularly thoracic medicine and the management and surveillance of tuberculosis and as President of the Australian Council of Smoking and Health WA	
Brian Cameron France	For service to business and financial organisations, particularly during the development period of the Australian Stock Exchange, and to the community	
Emeritus Professor George David Galliver	For service to music as a research scholar, singer, conductor and Elder Professor of Music, University of Adelaide, 1966 to 1983	
The Honourable Justice John Foster Gallop, RFD	For service to the law as judge, to military law as a member of the Defence Force Discipline Appeals Tribunal, and to the community	
John Alan Gilmour	For service to laboratory accreditation and standardisation through the National Association of Testing Authorities, the International Laboratory Accreditation Cooperation, and to the Asia Pacific Laboratory Accreditation Conference	
Professor John Reginald Glastonbury	For service to tertiary education as an administrator, to the development of engineering education, and to the preservation of Australia's railway heritage	
Edwin Raymond Gorham	For service to engineering, particularly in the development of the Pilbara Iron Ore Province, and other resource activities in Western Australia	
Dr Bronwyn Margaret Gould	For service to youth in New South Wales through Guides Australia and the National Association for the Prevention of Child Abuse and Neglect	
Robert Leslie Greaves	For service to the building and construction industry, in particular as past president of both the Australian Institute of Building, and the Master Builders’ Federation of Australia, and to youth through 'Youth For Christ'	
Andrew Douglas Grummet	For service to business, to the arts and to the community	
John Francis Halfpenny	For service to industrial relations, particularly through the Australian Council of Trade Unions and the Victorian Trades Hall Council	
Leigh Loddington Hall	For service to business and commerce, in particular to the improvement of ethical and professional standards and the efficiency of the Australian Securities Markets	
Trevor John Harris	For service to medicine, particularly in the field of plastic and reconstructive surgery, and to the management of head and neck cancer	
Frederick Rock Herd	For service to the meat industry in Australia, and to the community of Geelong	
Dr Peter Stuart Hetzel	For service to medicine in the field of cardiology, particularly in cardiac investigation and in the development of open-heart surgery at the Royal Adelaide Hospital	
Nora Heysen	For service to art as a painter of portraits and still life subjects	
Alan David Hickinbotham	For service to housing and urban development as Founder and managing director for over 40 years of the Hickinbotham Group, and to the community of Adelaide	
Peter McLaren Hiscock	For service to museums, historic parks, nature conservation and tourism	
Philip Matthew Holt	For service to business and industry through industrial development and consumer affairs	
Dr Alf Howard	For service to science through Antarctic exploration as a member of the British Australian New Zealand Antarctic Research Expedition (1929–1931), for his work on food technology and preservation, and for his contribution to statistical design	
The Reverend Alan Harry Jackson	For service to the community, particularly through the Parramatta Mission and as a Minister of the Uniting Church in Australia	
Wadim (Bill) Jegorow, MBE	For service to the community, in particular to multiculturalism and local government	
David Howard Jenkin	For service to international relations through the provision of overseas aid and development and disaster relief as Chairman of World Vision Australia	
Franceska Charlotte Jordan	For service to the community and to aged care as a past President of both the Alzheimers Association of Australia and the Queensland Branch of the Association	
Professor Max Kamien	For service to medicine, particularly in the area of Aboriginal health and rural medicine	
Sydney Whittle Kay, OAM ED	For service to veterans, in particular through fundraising as the Volunteer Promoter and Chairman of the RSL War Veterans’ Homes and Welfare Art Union	
Richard Albert Kell	For service to engineering, particularly in the area of structural design and the construction of bridges and for the export of engineering services to the Asia Pacific region	
Andrew Garrington Kemp	For service to business and commerce, and to the community	
Dr Alan Joseph King	For service to the community, in particular the Returned and Services League of Australia, and the St John Ambulance Brigade in Western Australia	
Dr John Franklin Knight	For service to the community through philanthropic contributions, in particular the establishment of the Medi-Aid Centre Foundation, and as an advocate through the media of public health and medical issues	
Andrew Heng Seak Koo	For service to the community, particularly through vocational education and training as Chairman of the Tasmanian State Training Authority, and Past Chairman of the Tasmanian Printing Industry Training Board	
Alan Keith Lavis	For service to the community through a wide range of organisations, in particular the Medical Benefits Fund of Australia from 1970 and as Queensland chairman since 1985	
Alexander MacGillivray	For service to the law and to the promotion of legal education in Queensland	
Professor Francis William Marsden	For service to medicine, in particular as a pioneer in 'limb salvage' in musculo-skeletal tumour surgery	
Carol Anne McCaskie	For service to social justice issues, as a lawyer and nurse, particularly in the area of prevention of drug and alcohol abuse	
Jack Hobbs McConnell	For service to architecture as a pioneer of the modern movement since World War II in South Australia and Victoria	
John Edward Moore	For service to the Society of St Vincent de Paul in New South Wales and the Australian Capital Territory	
Robin Stanley O'Regan, QC	For service to the Australian Red Cross at State and National levels	
Dr Alexander Allan Palmer	For service to medicine and medical research in the fields of anatomical pathology, cancer pathology, and haemorheology	
Patricia Anne Poole	For service to local government through the Coonabarabran Shire Council, the NSW Shires Association, and the Ulan County Council	
Professor Michael Charles Pryles	For service to national and international arbitration and mediation, in particular as President of the Australian Centre for International Commercial Arbitration	
Robert James Puffett	For service to technical and further education, in particular as director of the Sydney Institute of Technology since 1991	
Lionel Norman Rackley, DFC OAM AE	For service to military history as Chairman of the Brisbane Royal Australian Air Force Memorial Committee, and to people with intellectual disabilities	
John George Ravenhall	For service to youth, in particular through the Scout Association and its Leader Training Program	
Trevor James Reddacliff	For service to land development and the tourism industry, in particular as Chairman of the Urban Renewal Task Force in Brisbane, and to the performing arts through the Warana (now Brisbane) Festival	
Professor Janice Clare Reid	For service to cross-cultural public health research and the development of health services of socio-economically disadvantaged groups in the community	
Ruth Amelia Reid	For service to the community, in particular to charities that focus on assisting women and children	
Russell Gordon Rollason	For service to international development and international humanitarian aid through the Australian Council for Overseas Aid, and to the promotion of social justice in Australia	
Maurice Kevin Rudd	For service to industrial relations, particularly through the Australian Workers’ Union	
Dr John Peter Sarks	For service to ophthalmology, in particular to research into age-related macular disease	
Dr Shirley Heather Sarks	For service to ophthalmology, in particular to research into age-related macular disease	
Gabriel Savas	For service to the community in the area of policy development for Liquor Law reform, and to the Alcohol and Drug Foundation of the ACT	
Kevin John Sheedy	For service to Australian Rules football as a player and coach, and to the community	
Leslie Ernest Smith	For service to the community, particularly as the inaugural Electoral Commissioner of Western Australia	
Jack Smorgon	For service to the meeting of the processing industry as Deputy Chairman of the Smorgon Meat Group, and for his philanthropic contributions	
Arthur James Sparks	For service to rugby league football for over 43 years at state, national and international levels	
Dr Phillip Maxwell Spratt	For service to medicine, particularly in the field of cardiopulmonary transplant surgery	
Dr Alan Ernest Stocks	For service to medicine, particularly in the fields of diabetes and endocrinology	
Murray Herbert Tobias, RFD QC	For service to the legal profession, particularly through the New South Wales and Australian Bar Associations, and to military law	
Stuart Wagstaff	For service to the community, particularly through the Channel 7 Perth Telethon trust by raising funds for charities that support children's medical research	
Professor Max Norman-Isadore Walters	For service to medicine and education, particularly in the field of pathology, to medical research, and to the community	
John Stuart Walton	For service to the community, in particular to public health administration, and to Australian heritage	
Dr Sydney Charles Warneke	For service to the dental profession, particularly through organised dentistry and in the field of dental oncology and oral cancer rehabilitation	
Emeritus Professor Donald Walter Watts	For service to the advancement of science in the field of chemistry, to tertiary education, and to policy development in education	
William Henry Watts	For service to medicine, in particular ophthalmology, and to the provision of ophthalmic services in the Pacific region	
Dr Martin Wesley-Smith	For service to music as a composer, scriptwriter, children's songwriter, lecturer, presenter of multimedia concerts, and a member of various Australia Council boards and committees	
Victor Charles West	For service to dentistry in the field of orthodontics as an educator and administrator, and to the community	
Associate Professor Mary Therese Westbrook	For service to people with disabilities, in particular those suffering from post-polio syndrome, and to the education in the field of health sciences research	
Dr Neville Graeme White	For service to scientific research, particularly in the field of biological anthropology in Indigenous Australian groups, and for service to the Aboriginal community of Donydji	
Warwick James Wilkinson, RFD ED	For service to the development of pharmacy in Australia through involvement in education and industry and professional bodies, and to the community	
Enid Joyce Williams	For service to the health of people with eating disorders as Founder of the Anorexia Bulimia Nervosa Association of South Australia	
The Reverend John Michael Williams	For service to education, as Director of Catholic Education in Tasmania from 1969 to 1993	
Sister Roseabel Jessie Williamson	For service to international humanitarian assistance as a medical missionary in the central and eastern highlands of Irian Jaya for more than 30 years	
Douglas Thomas Wright	For service to the metal trades industry, particularly as director of the New South Wales Branch, Metal Trades Industry Association of Australia	
Dr Burt Zerner	For service to science, particularly in the field of biochemistry, and to education	

==== Military Division ====
Branch	Recipient	Citation	Notes
Navy	Principal chaplain Max Leroy Davis	For exceptional service to the Royal Australian Navy, particularly as the director general chaplaincy – Navy	
Army	Colonel Peter Alexander Bysouth DFC	For exceptional service to the Australian Army in the fields of aviation and service conditions	
Army	Brigadier Peter Francis Haddad	For exceptional service to the Australian Defence Force in the field of logistics, in particular as the director of the Defence Logistic Redevelopment Project	
Army	Brigadier Maurice William Meecham	For exceptional service to the Australian Army, in particular as director of military art at the Royal Military College Duntroon, as commander 6th Brigade and as the first commander of the 7th Task Force	
Army	Colonel Neil McLay Wilson RFD	For exceptional service and contribution to the Army Reserve in South Australia	
Air Force	Air Commodore Ian Harley Ashbrook	For exceptional service to the Royal Australian Air Force in the fields of aeronautical engineering and logistics	
Air Force	Flight Sergeant Keith Charles Knight	For exceptional service to the Royal Australian Air Force as an imagery analyst	
Air Force	Group Captain Christopher Geoffrey Spence	For exceptional service to the Royal Australian Air Force as Officer Commanding No 86 Wing, Richmond, New South Wales	

=== Medal of the Order of Australia (OAM) ===
==== General Division ====
Recipient	Citation	Notes
Lily Adonis	For service to the Jewish community, particularly through the Western Australian Division of the Women's International Zionist Organisation for over 50 years	
Marlene Barbara Anderson	For service to tennis as a player, coach and administrator	
Ailsa Anderson	For service to people with physical disabilities, in particular through the Paraplegic and Quadriplegic Association of Queensland	
Dr Ronald Werner Bade	For service to the community, in particular to the aged community of the West Wimmera region	
Charles Ian Badham	For service to the community as executive director of NRMA Careflight and as co-founder of the first helicopter medical/rescue service in Australia	
Dallas Arthur Baker	For service to the community, in particular as coordinator of the Queensland State Disaster Auxiliary and executive officer of the State Emergency Services Volunteer Executive Committee	
Valerie Muriel Ball	For service to local government as Mayor of Strathalbyn since 1987, and to the community	
Ernest John Barnes	For service to the community of the Breeza district	
Melvyn Barnett	For service to the community, particularly through the Victims of Crime Assistance League (VOCAL)	
Evelyn Mary Beckenham	For service to youth through the Girls Friendly Society, and to the provision of accommodation for homeless young women	
Marie May Benfield	For service to veterans and their families as president of the Women's Auxiliary of the Mildura Sub-Branch of the Returned and Services League of Australia for 30 years	
Norma Benporath	For service to the craft of tatting as a designer and through the international publication of her patterns	
Judith Helen Bertalli	For service to the Aboriginal community of Dareton by creating employment opportunities and promoting local artists' work through the Tulklana Kumbi Aboriginal Gallery	
June Bevan	For service to badminton as a player, coach, selector, and administrator.	
John Lynn Birtchnell	For service to the community, in particular for service on the Alexandra Secondary College Council from 1967 to 1994, and through Rotary International, the Salvation Army, the Country Fire Authority and the Australian Red Cross Society	
The Reverend Dr Geoffrey Herbert Blackburn	For service to the Baptist Church, in particular through the Baptist Union of Australia and the Baptist World Alliance	
Mabel (Anne) Bladon	For service to the community through the Mary Bladon Christian Fellowship which supports and sponsors christian evangelists to assist people who are disadvantaged	
Peter John Blatch	For service to youth as a leader of the Scout movement for over 20 years	
Dr Edwin Cordeaux Blomfield	For service to the community of the Bega Valley as a medical practitioner and as a supporter of local organisations and charities	
Sister Lucina Bourke	For service to people with intellectual disabilities through the establishment of the Emmaus Ministry in Western Sydney, and as National President of Faith and Light	
Lennard Steve Brajkovich	For service to the chicken meat industry, particularly through the Chicken Meat Industry Committee, the Western Australian Chicken Meat Council, and the Australian Chicken Growers’ Council	
John Thomas Brewer	For service to the community, particularly through Southern Cross Care (formerly Southern Cross Homes), the Knights of the Southern Cross, the Seniors On Line Project, and Neighbourhood Watch	
Dr Patrick Matthew Briody	For service to education as a teacher, administrator and consultant	
The Reverend Father Peter Julian Brock	For service to choral music, particularly as musical director of the Newcastle University Choir since 1979	
Keith Ronald Brown	For service to the community of Hay through local government, the Returned and Services League of Australia, the Hay Hospital Board, and to lawn bowls	
Dr Peter Ferguson Brownell	For service to science in the field of plant physiology, to education, and to the community	
Stephen Hawdon Buck	For service to the preservation of railway heritage through the ACT Chapter of the Australian Historical Society, the Canberra Railway Museum and the Michelago Tourist Railway	
Alice Inez Buffett	For service to the Norfolk Island community, particularly as a member of the Legislative Assembly advocating initiatives to improve health care facilities and social infrastructure	
Sister Bernice Ann Bugler	For service to adults with intellectual disabilities as Founder and Director of the Irabina Association	
Samuel Burgess	For service to the transport industry through the Chartered Institute of Transport, and to tourism as Chairman of the Zig Zag Railway	
John Robert Burley	For service to the welfare of veterans and their families through the Nyngan Sub-Branch of the Returned and Services League of Australia	
Marion Lorys Burns	For service to the community through organisations established by the Uniting Church in the Bendigo region to assist aged people and underprivileged members of society	
Sandra Mary Burrage	For service to youth, including Guides with Disabilities, and to the community of Annangrove	
Alan Augustine Burt	For service to the Ashburton community through charitable and sporting organisations, in particular Meals on Wheels	
Nina Dorothea Kestell Buscombe	For service to the community through the Motor Neurone Disease Association of Victoria, the Victorian School for Deaf Children, the Victorian Council of Social Service and Zonta	
Peter Mark Butler, RFD	For service to the community, in particular to children and families through Berry Street Inc and the promotion of pro bono legal services	
Brian Roger Bywater	For service to community history, as co-organiser of the Kookaburra March and the Coo-ee March re-enactments	
Betty Bridget Caelli	For service to people with intellectual disabilities through the Delando Crescent Welfare Corporation, and to the community	
William Martin Callinan	For service to high school education as a School Principal and through the Australian High School Principals’ Association	
Mary Anne Carroll	For service to the community, particularly through the organisation Compassionate Friends, and as a fundraiser for St Margaret's Hospital	
Ena Mary Carson	For service to the community of Mt Gravatt, particularly through the Mt Gravatt Agricultural, Horticultural and Industrial Society, the Mt Gravatt Show Girl Quest and the Mt Gravatt Highland Charity	
Sita Carter	For service to community health as Honorary Secretary of the Council of the Anglican Deaconess Institution, Sydney and as a fundraiser for the Hope Healthcare Group	
Dr Dorothea Mabel Cerutty	For service to education, music, drama, the arts and the community	
Russell Edwin Chancellor	For service to the community, in particularly as Honorary Treasurer of the Australian Brain Foundation	
Robyn Margaret Chaplin	For service to the sport of fencing as an administrator and delegate at state, national and international levels	
Dr Joseph Yee-Tim Cheung	For service to medicine, particularly through the Australian Chinese Medical Association for over 20 years	
Leslie David Chignell	For service to veterans, in particular through the Balgowlah-Seaforth-Clontarf Sub-Branch of the Returned and Services League of Australia	
Brian David Church, APM	For service to the community in the area of social justice through promoting multiculturalism and Aboriginal reconciliation	
The Reverend Benjamin Albert Clarke	For service to the community by assisting drought affected rural parishes, and as Honorary Chaplain of the Currumbin/Palm Beach Returned and Services Leagues Club	
Rita May Clarke	For service to charities and community organisations as a fundraiser, performer and organiser of musical events	
Edward William Cockram	For service to the development of horseracing and horse-breeding through the Australian Bloodhorse Breeders Association, the Victorian Bloodhorse Breeders Committee, the Victorian Owners and Breeders Incentive Scheme, and as Manager of Arundel Stud Farm	
Peter Louis Cohen	For service to hockey at state, national and international levels as a player, coach and administrator	
Sister Mary Barbara Cohen	For service to nursing, particularly in the field of haemodialysis	
Brian Frederick Cooper	For service to veterans as an advocate and as an Executive Member of veterans’ organisations in Western Australia	
Richard Cooper	For service to surf lifesaving, in particular as a coach to the Manly Junior Life Saving Club	
Emanuel Austin Cooper	For service to the Shepparton community, in particular as an Elder of the Yorta Yorta Aboriginal people and as an administrator of Aboriginal community service organisations in Victoria	
Vincent Thomas Corbin	For service to the communities of Winton and Longreach, particularly through the Lions Club and the Scout Association of Australia	
Dr William Thomas Costello	For service to the Grafton and Clarence Valley communities as a surgeon and educator, and to the cattle industry through the Angus Society and the Grafton Abattoir Co-operative	
John Francis (Mick) Cotter	For service to communities in the Eastern Goldfields region, in particular through the Royal Flying Doctor Service	
Paul Couvret	For service to local government through the Warringah Shire Council, to veterans, and to the community	
Lesley Mary Cox	For service to child development, in particular as the director of the Lesley Cox School of Music, Movement and Drama, and to the community	
Edward Charles Crane	For service to the community of Mildura, particularly through the State Emergency Service	
Doreen Upton Crawford	For service to community health as instigator and co-founder of the A H Crawford Cancer Treatment Society Inc. Trust through the provision of palliative care equipment and accommodation for country people with cancer, and their families	
Evelyn Mary Cruddas	For service to nursing, particularly as Director of Nursing at the Lord Fraser Home for the Aged Blind	
Laszlo Istvan Csaba	For service to the Hungarian community, in particular through the Australian Hungarian Association of Western Australia and the Council of Hungarian Associations of Western Australia	
Phyllis Gwendolyne Currie	For service to children as a foster parent, to the Amputees Association of Victoria, and to the community	
Stanislawa Dabrowski	For service to homeless youth in Canberra through the establishment of a soup kitchen providing food for over 200 persons each week	
John Patrick Daffy	For service to people with disabilities through Yalundah Adult Services Incorporated, to the community and to local government	
Robert Clive Dahl	For service to the community and, in particular, aged people through the Gladstone Central Committee on the ageing	
Trevor Davidson	For service to young people in detention centres by enhancing links with community service groups, in particular legal service providers	
Myrza Wesley Dawson	For service to veterans through the Avoca Sub-Branch of the Returned Services League of Australia, and to the community through fundraising and welfare activities	
Beryl Rose Dawson	For service to veterans through the Avoca Returned and Services Ladies Auxiliary, and to the community through fundraising and welfare activities	
Margaret (Nancy) Day	For service to the promotion of bicycle transportation and cycling as a recreation through the Bicycle Institute of South Australia and the Bicycle Federation of Australia	
Nora Bernece Delany	For service to the community of Bright, especially through promoting improved health and welfare services, and to the Bright Hospital Board	
Dulcie Mabel Denson	For service to the community, in particular through the Old Noarlunga Branch and the Warrekila Group of the Country Women's Association	
Sidney Colin Diffey, MBE MC ED	For service to the community of Rutherglen through the Returned and Services League of Australia, Glenview Community Care, the North East Pastoral Council of the Victorian Farmers Federation, the Country Fire Authority and the Albury Wodonga Council of Social Services	
Sidney Drury	For service to the community through the Multiple Sclerosis Society of the ACT and the ACT Branch of Technical Aid to the Disabled, and to veterans through the Returned and Services League of Australia	
Anne Dryen	For service to charitable organisations and to the Jewish community over 60 years	
John Edward Dunbabin	For service to the rural community through Rural Support Tasmania, and to youth through the Rural Youth Organisation of Tasmania	
Noel Frederick Dunn	For service to the United Grand Lodge of Ancient, Free and Accepted Masons of New South Wales as Grand Masters from 1992 to 1996, and as President of the Frank Whiddon Masonic Homes of NSW	
Patricia Irene Eaton	For service to animal welfare through the rescue and rehabilitation of Australian wildlife	
Charles Louis Evans	For service to youth and supporting groups on Norfolk Island	
Keith Bernard Eyles	For service to athletics for over 40 years through the New South Wales Athletics League, and to Rugby League football as a coach and referee	
Thomas Francis Keith Fitzgerald	For service to veterans through the Naval Association of Australia, Queensland section	
Thomas David Fitzgerald	For service to the community of Warren and surrounding district, in particular to veterans and war widows through the Warren Sub-Branch of the Returned and Services League of Australia	
Florence Fletcher	For service to the community of Inglewood	
Robert Neville Francis	For service to the community, particularly through supporting charitable organisations which seek to help young people, and to the media in the area of talk-balk radio	
Ann Freak	For service to youth through the Girl Guide movement in South Australia for more than 60 years and as a fundraiser for the Crippled Children's Association	
William Cecil Fripp	For service to local government through the Bega Valley Shire Council and to the community through the Tura Beach Progress Association	
Celia Muriel Fry	For service to the community of Cairns, in particular through the Girl Guide movement for over 70 years	
John Richard David Gabriel	For service to veterans through the Royal Australian Air Force Association, Mandurah Branch	
Frances Jean Gallagher	For service to fundraising as a founding member and president for 12 years of the Christopher Robin Committee at the Sydney Children's Hospital	
Stanley Ernest Galvin	For service to the community through the Tidy Towns Committee, the Parks & Gardens Committee and the Yerong Creek Sub-Branch of the Returned and Services League of Australia	
Allan Allman Gamble	For service to architectural history through drawing and documenting Sydney's architectural landscape, and to arts administration	
Trevor Barry Gavin	For service to Rugby League football through the Australian Secondary Schools Rugby League Council and the Queensland State Secondary Schools Sports Association	
Reginald Gillard	For service to local government, the community and the Australian parliament	
Peter Somerville Golding	For service to the Executive Council of the Australian Red Cross Society, New South Wales Division, and to the Rotary Club of Society	
Norman Stephen Gonsalves	For service to ballroom dancing as an adjudicator, coach, organiser and dancer, and as Honorary Secretary of the Dancing Association of South Australia for over 30 years	
Dundas Corbet Gore	For service to civil engineering, particularly as Project Director for the construction of the Sydney Opera House	
Agnes Edwina Grady	For service to veterans through the Royal Australian Air Force Association, Canberra Branch	
Eleanor Betty Grey	For service to education through the Australian Education Union, Tasmanian Branch, and to the community through organisations including the National Council of Women and Zonta International	
Alan Joseph Grindal	For service to cycling as a competitor, and to the promotion of the sport by coaching juniors	
Felicity Jane Gunner	For service to the community, particularly through the Alzheimer's Association at the state and national levels	
Margaret Mary McLean Hamilton	For service to veterans through the Returned Sisters Sub-Branch of the Returned and Services League of Australia, and to the community through the Guild of Christ Church, St Lucia	
Roy Albert Hamilton	For service to the community of Kununurra, and to fostering agricultural and industry development in the region	
Neville David Hannaford	For service to music through the Brighton Secondary School and the Australian Music Examinations Board	
Trudy Hanson	For service to the community as New South Wales State Director of the Citizen Radio Emergency Service teams for 15 years, the National Association for Loss and Grief, and the State Emergency Service	
Dr Vivian Lee Hawke	For service to medicine, particularly as a general practitioner in the Semaphore area for more than 50 years	
William Keith Hayes	For service to education, particularly through the Creche and Kindergarten Association of Queensland	
Winifred Mary Healey	For service to the welfare of children as a foster parent, particularly children with disabilities or behavioural problems	
John Francis Healy	For service to the community through charitable organisations, and for his work with young men in their sport and personal development	
Joyce Hecker	For service to the community, in particular through the Friends of Walkerville Library, Neighbourhood Watch and the Blind Welfare Association	
Peter Leonard Henssler	For service to veterans, particularly through the Vietnam Veterans Welfare Association	
Paulene Marie Hertslet	For service to the Brewarrina community, in particular through local government, health and aged care organisations	
Ian Laurie Hickinbotham	For service to the Australian winemaking industry	
Brother James Thomas Higgins	For service to the Catholic school education system, and to the community	
Councillor John Maurice Hill	For service to local government, in particular as Mayor of the Lachlan Shire, and to the Yaddra Volunteer Bush Fire Brigade as Secretary for over 50 years	
Terence William Hogan	For service to the community, through the Anglican Church Perth Diocesan Trustees, the Anglican Deposit Fund Board and the Anglican Homes Inc Board	
David Laurence Hordern	For service to education, particularly in the field of special education, and to the community	
Yvonne Mary Howell	For service to the community, particularly through the Angliss Hospital Ladies Auxiliary for more than 40 years	
William Richard Hoyles	For service to youth, in particular as Director of Youth Services and Aftercare for Barnardos Australia	
Terence Burton Huey	For service to lawn bowls at local and state levels	
Olive Dorothy Johnson	For service to lawn bowls, and to the community through the Fellowship of First Fleeters and the Sutherland Shire Historical Society	
Eric Ernest Jolliffe	For service to art as a cartoonist and illustrator	
Lawrence Edwin Jones	For service to the community, particularly in the field of social welfare through ‘Near Care’ and ‘Clayfield Care’, and to the Neighbourhood Tree Watch	
Brenda Kable	For service to the community, in particular through the Avalon Community Library, the Avalon Preservation Trust and the Pangloss Circle	
Ette Ilamri Kainu	For service to multiculturalism through Finnish community organisations, the Ethnic Broadcasting Association of Queensland and the Ethnic Communities Council of Queensland	
Evangeline (Lilly) Kelaidis	For service to the Greek community, in particular through organisations including the Order of AHEPA, the Greek Orthodox Community of St George, and the Hellenic Sub-Branch of the Returned and Services League of Australia	
George William Kelly	For service to the community, particularly through the Southpaw Stroke Club and the Lions Club of Canberra Valley	
Leon Victor Kempler	For service to trade, in particular as federal chairman of the Australian Israel Chamber of Commerce	
Warren Gordon Kermond	For service to the community through charitable and arts organisations	
Dr William Campbell Kerr	For service to medicine, particularly in the field of psychiatry	
Thomas Andrew Kettle	For service to the community, particularly through organising fundraising treks across Australia for charitable organisations	
Sandra Dianne King	For service to squash	
Yee Lam	For service to the Chinese community, particularly through the Victorian Elderly Chinese Academy	
John Henry Law	For service to cricket through the Western Suburbs United Churches Cricket Association and the Barkly Street Uniting Church Cricket Club	
Peggy Doreen Lawton	For service to the community through the Flinders Medical Centre Volunteer Service	
Ruth Leitch	For service to the community of Moree through charitable organisations, particularly the Salvation Army	
Elaine Grace Leneghan	For service to the community, particularly through the Stroke and Disability Information (Hunter) Inc. and other community care organisations in the Newcastle area	
Betty Ruby Levy	For service to the community of Springwood, particularly through her involvement with numerous community organisations including the Red Cross Society, and the Blue Mountains Concert Society	
Grahame Kerr Lindsay	For service to surveying, through membership of professional associations and as Commonwealth Surveyor General, and to the community	
Frances Anne Long	For service to the community through musical performances and fundraising as musical director of the Bell Singers	
Sydney Joseph Long	For service to the welfare of veterans and their families, and to junior cricket and football	
The Honourable Kenneth Francis Lowrie, OBE	For service to the community, to local government and to the sport of lawn bowls	
Neville Coleman Loxton	For service to the community of Bundaberg, particularly as chairman of ‘Argo-Trend’, a major annual fundraising event	
Maisie Lupton	For service to the communities of Warrimoo, Springwood and the Lower Blue Mountains district	
Robert Archibald Macdonald	For service to youth through the Scout Association of Australia, particularly as the New South Wales Branch Commissioner for International Activities	
Joan Norma Doris Mannell	For service to youth as a teacher of music and ballet, to the community through fundraising concerts, and as organist for Scone Uniting Church for over 40 years	
Joy Elaine Marks, BEM	For service to veterans as Honorary Welfare/Pensions Officer of the Council of Ex-Servicewomen's Associations (NSW)	
Myra Joyce Martin, BEM	For service to the community as a teacher of dance, and as a volunteer and fundraiser for community organisations	
Robert Lewis Maslen	For service to youth through the Scout Association of Australia, particularly as the chief commissioner of the South Australian Branch, and through the Youth Affairs Council for South Australia	
Kenneth Charles McDonagh	For service to the welfare of the aged community, particularly through the Addie Mills Senior Citizens Centre and the Gosnells and District Stroke Club	
Elizabeth Harrison McDonagh	For service to the welfare of the aged community, particularly through the Addie Mills Senior Citizens Centre and the Gosnells and District Stroke Club	
Anthony John McEniry	For service to the community, particularly through the Bendigo unit of the Victoria State Emergency Service	
Evan David McGrath	For service to the local community of Mareeba, particularly through local government, community groups and sporting organisations	
Professor Jim McKnight	For service to the community through the Smith Family, Lifeline, the Homecare Service and other charitable organisations	
Timothy George McLaren	For service to rowing, particularly as a coach of Australian crews participating at the 1992 and 1996 Olympic Games and in world rowing championships since 1990, and in on-water coach education	
Mack Charles McLaren	For service to veterans through the ACT Branch of the Rats of Tobruk Association, and to the community as a supporter of the ACT Branch of the Australian Red Cross Society	
Lindsay Edward McMillan	For service to veterans, particularly through the Walcha Sub-Branch of the Returned and Services League of Australia and the Walcha Ex-Service Memorial Club, and to the community	
Ernest Mervyn McQuillan	For service to journalism, particularly in the field of media photography	
Anthony Michael	For service to the Greek community through the Hellenic Youth Association and its associated sporting activities	
Colin James Mickan	For service to the community, particularly as chairperson of the Kapunda Hospital Board and through the promotion of health services in rural South Australia	
Ronald Middleton	For service to the community of Bunbury, particularly in the fields of music and the arts	
Alan Leigh Middleton	For service to educational administration through Melbourne High School, particularly as a member of the School Council for 34 years	
Nancy Agnes Millington	For service to the community, particularly through the Dudley Hospital Auxiliary	
Charles Joseph Mitchell	For service to local government and to the community of Walgett	
Alan Grafton Mitchell	For service to the profession of naval architecture through the Australian Division of the Royal Institution of Naval Architects	
Ailsa Marlene Morris	For service to women in rural areas through the Queensland Country Women's Association	
Clifford Munro Moss	For service to veterans, particularly through the Katunga Sub-Branch of the Returned and Services League of Australia and the Murray-Goulburn Ex POW Association, and to the community	
Kerin James Mulhall	For service to veterans, particularly through the Townsville Sub-Branch of the Returned and Services League of Australia, and to the community	
The Reverend Joe Mullins, MC	For service to the community, particularly through the Anglican Church and as Rector of St Peter's Church, Weston	
Keith Douglas Munro	For service to the community, particularly as the honorary curator of the Royal Australian Corps of Signals Museum	
Keith Robert Murton	For service to hockey and to the Australian Olympic movement	
John Alfred Neale, RFD ED	For service to veterans, particularly through the Albury Sub-Branch of the Returned and Services League of Australia, and to the Albury Wodonga Branch of the Military History Society	
Zika Nester	For service to the arts as co-founder, chief tutor and registrar of the Ensemble Acting Studios in Sydney	
Vytautas Stasys Neverauskas	For service to the Lithuanian community, particularly as president of the Adelaide Lithuanian Association	
Sheila Elspeth Newman-Truswell	For service to social work in the areas of social justice and the fostering of excellence in professional standards	
Michael John Noonan	For service to the arts as an author of numerous novels, works of non-fiction, television scripts and plays	
Ronald O'Connor	For service to the community, particularly to surf lifesaving, and to the welfare of aged people	
Edwin Vivien O'Dea	For service to the community, particularly as an active member of the Society of St Vincent de Paul for over 50 years	
Professor Frank Oberklaid	For service to medicine, particularly in the field of ambulatory paediatrics and child health	
Edward James Ovens	For service to the community, particularly through the Coffs Harbour District Council of the Banana Growers Federation for 44 years, and to surf lifesaving	
Robert William Page	For service to the community, particularly as a member of the Beacon Hill Volunteer Bush Fire Brigade	
Senior Constable David Rowntree Parker	For service to youth as the founder and coordinator of the Camp Hill Blue Light Disco, and to the community	
Lindsay Douglas Patience	For service to the community, particularly through his involvement in various community organisations and fundraising activities for charity	
Nehama Ruth Patkin	For service to the community, particularly as a piano and music teacher, and as an administrator and organiser of musical events for charity	
Marion Jessie Patterson	For service to athletics, in particular race walking, through the Victorian Women's Amateur Athletic Association and Athletics Australia	
Geoffrey Arthur Pattison	For service to photography, particularly through the Tasmanian Photographic Federation and the Australian Photographic Society, and to the community	
Olive Mary Paull	For service to the community through local organisations, including Meals on Wheels	
John Bartley Pearson	For service to the community, particularly through the Australian Volunteer Coast Guard Association and the Herbert River Farmers League	
Lindsay John Peck, MBE	For service to veterans, particularly through the 7th Division Engineers Association, and to the community	
Allan Cunliffe Perry	For service to the community, particularly through local government	
Joyce Mary Petfield	For service to athletics as an administrator and official for over 35 years	
Patrick Joseph Phelan	For service to the community, particularly through the Manly Lantern Club and the Royal Institute for Deaf and Blind Children	
Juanita Catherine Phelan	For service to the community, particularly through the Manly Lantern Club and the Royal Institute for Deaf and Blind Children	
Lance Arthur Pickering	For service to the community as the National President of Heart Support Australia	
Councillor Noel Edgar Playford	For service to the community and to local government in the promotion of regional development through the South East Queensland Regional Economic Development Committee	
Monsignor Raymond Ignatius Pope	For service to the community of Kadina-Wallaroo, particularly through the Catholic Church Meals on Wheels and the Star of the Sea Hostel and Nursing Home	
Jessie Mary Porteous	For service to people with visual impairments as a voluntary transcriber of texts into Braille for over 35 years	
Gwenyth Evelyn Price	For service to the community, and to community history in particular, by producing a photographic history of the Cue-Day Dawn area	
Dr John Prior	For service to the community of Boggabri, particularly as a medical practitioner for over 45 years, and for his involvement with local community organisations	
Alistair McDonald Ramsay, MBE	For service to basketball, particularly as the Founder and Secretary General of the Oceania Basketball Confederation	
Ian Malcolm Lesley Ramsay	For service to the community as a volunteer with the Department of Family and Community Services, and in particular for his involvement with the Central Western Work Program	
Dr Balaji Rao	For service to the community, particularly aged people, through the Lions Club of Tocumwal and district	
Tamarapakam Janardhana Rao	For service to the Indian community, particularly through the Federation of Indian Associations of Victoria and the Consulate of India, Melbourne	
Helen Lorain Rasko	For service to the entertainment industry and to charitable organisations, particularly through the Actors Benevolent Fund	
Maxwell Hansley Rawnsley	For service to the Scamander community	
Allan Claude Ray	For service to tourism and to youth employment in the Hunter region	
Stephen John Christopher Raymond	For service to radio and television, and to community organisations	
Robert Alwyn Raymond	For service to the media and television industry, particularly as a director and producer of television documentaries and public affairs programs	
Garda Eileen Richardson	For service to the community and to youth, particularly through the Glen Life Group and Life Link Samaritans	
Frances Hamilton Rigby	For service to the community, particularly through the Central Council of Auxiliaries of the Royal Melbourne Hospital	
Charles Arthur Risby	For service to primary industry, particularly in the development of the Tasmanian hardwood sawmilling industry, and to the community	
William Alexander Robertson	For service to the community, particularly to veterans and their families through the Clovelly Sub-Branch of the Returned and Services League of Australia	
Neil James Rogers	For service to the community, and to veterans and their families	
Louise Rosenberg	For service to the Jewish community, particularly as secretary of the Australian Jewish Historical Society	
Norman Rothfield	For service to the promotion of peace and human rights in Australia and internationally	
Evelyn Rothfield	For service to the promotion of peace and human rights in Australia and internationally	
Donald Edward John Rowe	For service to the community and to veterans, particularly through the Armidale Sub-Branch of the Returned and Services League of Australia	
Patricia Ann Rowland	For service to veterans and their families, particularly through the Western Australian State Headquarters of the Returned and Services League of Australia	
Emeritus Professor James Geoffrey Pennefather Ryan	For service to medicine and medical education in the specialty of general practice and community medicine	
Bryce Wesley Saint	For service to the community, particularly to children, through the Safety House Association of South Australia	
Brian George Sandow	For service to the community, particularly through the Anglican Church	
Benedick Samuel Joseph Schuster	For service to veterans and their families, particularly through the Burleigh Heads Sub-Branch of the Returned and Services League of Australia and Gold Coast Legacy	
Colin Ivor Schwartz	For service to the wheat industry in New South Wales, in particular grain handling, storage and distribution, and to the community	
Robert (Jock) Scott	For service to the ex-service community, particularly through the National Headquarters of the Returned and Services League of Australia and the Australian-Hellenic Memorial Committee	
Joanna Seabrook	For service to conservation and the environment, particularly through the regeneration of native vegetation in Western Australia	
Anne Veronica Shapcott	For service to the welfare of the ex-service community and to youth, particularly through the Air Training Corps	
Leonard Jack Shapcott	For service to the welfare of the ex-service community and to youth, particularly through the Air Training Corps	
Carl Sharpe	For service to sports administration, particularly cricket, in Orange and the western region of New South Wales for over 30 years	
John William Sharpe	For service to the community, particularly through surf lifesaving and the Australian Winter Swimming Association	
Elsa Dorothea Sheldrick	For service to the Leeton community, particularly through the Red Cross and Uniting Church	
Ellen Margaret Shepherd	For service to the community, particularly to senior citizens, by providing musical entertainment and supporting fundraising activities for over 40 years	
Robert Eugene Shergis	For service to the hairdressing industry, particularly in South Australia	
Eric Singleton	For service to wildlife conservation through the establishment of the Eric Singleton Bird Sanctuary in Bayswater	
Joan Cicely Skaife	For service to the community of Wyong and district	
Kathleen Jean Smith	For service to people with disabilities, particularly through the Riding for the Disabled Association	
Cyril Charles Smith	For service to the community, particularly through the Diamond Creek Progress Association and the Anglican Church, and management of the Sutherland Homes for Children for over 40 years	
Lewis Donald Bernard Smithall	For service to the community, particularly as a volunteer with the St John Ambulance and the Northam Fire Brigade	
David Colling Southern	For service to education and to the community, particularly through Rotary	
Duncan Stalker	For service to education, in particular the Australian Secondary Principals Association, and to the community	
Rosemary Allison Stanton	For service to community health, particularly through education in the field of nutrition and dietetics	
Santina Stransky	For service to the community, particularly children, through fundraising activities for Save the Children Fund and the Princess Margaret Hospital for Children	
Sista Alice Edith Strom	For service to the preservation of maritime history	
Geoffrey Edwin Summerhayes	For service to the arts through the Art Gallery of Western Australia, and to the community	
Dawn Sword	For service to the community, particularly in the provision of child care facilities	
Hurtle Douglas Symons	For service to the community, particularly through promoting multiculturalism and through the Sovereign Order of St John of Jerusalem	
Josef Szoka	For service to the Polish community of Launceston, particularly through the Good Neighbour Council and the Polish Returned and Services League	
Mavis Kingston Taber	For service to people with hearing disabilities, particularly through the Wagga Wagga branch of Better Hearing Australia	
Donald John Haig Taggart	For service to the preservation of community history through the Historical Society of St Kilda since 1975	
Captain Alan James Tait	For service to shipping, particularly through industry and safety reform	
Rose Matilda Taylor	For service to the community, particularly through the Sandgate and District Senior Citizens Centre	
Lola Stafford Teale	For service to the Glenreagh community, particularly through the Country Women's Association	
Carmen Testa	For service to the Maltese community in the West Sunshine area for over 45 years	
Peter Theo Theophilou	For service to the Green community in the Bankstown area	
Donald McLean Tibbits	For service to veterans, particularly through the 2/23rd Battalion Association, for over 40 years	
Alan Alfred Ticehurst	For service to the community of Cloncurry and Mount Isa	
Associate Professor Maurice Hutchison Todd	For service to social work education, to professional organisations, and to the community	
Marjorie Amy Todd	For service to the Armidale community for over 50 years	
David Victor Torr	For service to the community as Works Manager for the New South Wales Rail Transport Museum	
Lieutenant Colonel Lucille Leila Turfrey	For service to the community through the Salvation Army	
Hilda (Billi) Turney	For service to the Tweed Heads and Gold Coast communities for over 35 years	
Keppel Arthur Turnour	For service to the community, particularly to aged people through the Shepparton and District Retirement Villages Inc for over 30 years	
James William Valladares	For service to the ex-service community for over 50 years through the Saddleworth Sub-Branch of the Returned and Services League of Australia	
Silvana Vidoni	For service to the community, particularly to children with disabilities	
Domenico Vitocco	For service to the community of south western Sydney through business and community organisations	
Ian Charles Wall	For service to the welfare of the ex-service community	
William Angus Walsh	For service to the welfare of the aged community, particularly through fundraising activities	
Robert Daniel Walshe	For service to education and the environment	
Gwendoline Ann Walton	For service to the Hyden community, particularly through the Isolated Children's Parents’ Association, and as a sports administrator	
Gwendoline Mary Walton	For service to the Scarborough community, particularly by being a blood donor for over 45 years involving over 345 donations and through fundraising activities	
The Reverend Canon John Alfred Warby, ED	For service to the Aboriginal community, the Anglican Church and ex-service organisations	
Douglas Morton Warlters	For service to the Camden Haven Valley community for over 40 years	
John Stanley Warner	For service to the Edenhope community	
Captain Nicholas James Gregory Watling, DFC	For service to the community and to aviation, particularly as a pilot with the Royal Flying Doctor Service	
Marion Lesley Watson	For service to community health through organisations helping to rehabilitate people with drug and alcohol dependencies	
Colleen Janie Watts	For service to the Carcoar community, particular the welfare of aged people	
Joan Wearne	For service to the community of the Blue Mountains	
Barbara Jane Webb	For service to the Dubbo and Brewarrina Shire communities, particularly through the Australian Red Cross Society	
James Greer Webster	For service to sports journalism, and as Media Director for the Olympic and Commonwealth Games	
Richard John Wells	For service to the welfare of the ex-service community	
Ross William Wells	For service to the wool industry for over 30 years	
Dennis Fredrick White	For service to the Lithgow community by providing musical entertainment for the aged	
Doreen Joyce White	For service to the Lithgow community by providing musical entertainment for the aged	
Frank Whittington	For service to local government and to the Brookton community, particularly through the Volunteer Fire Brigade	
Ronald James Wilkinson, DFC	For service to the community	
Keith Albert Walter Williams	For service to conservation and the environment	
Jean Marie Woodbury	For service to the community through the Sandgate and District Senior Citizens’ Centre	
William Wright	For service to youth through the Scout Association of Australia	
Peter Yiallouris	For service to the Greek and Cypriot communities	
Dr Allen Peng Yung	For service to medicine, particularly in the field of infections diseases	
Yvonne June Zardani	For service to the community, particularly to women and the aged	
Lewis Lloyd Zilles, ED	For service to pipe bands, brass bands and marching girls’ organisations for over 75 years	

==== Military Division ====
Branch	Recipient	Citation	Notes
Navy	Lieutenant Commander Brian William Barnett RFD	For meritorious service and devotion to duty as a member of the Royal Australian Naval Reserve, especially in the field of Naval Control of Shipping	
Navy	Warrant Officer Noel Cregan Kirk	For meritorious service and outstanding achievement in the field of catering in the Royal Australia Navy, in particular as the Catering Manager in HMAS Stirling	
Navy	Lieutenant Commander David Christian Scott	For meritorious service in the provision of intelligence support to the Royal Australian Navy and the Australian Defence Force	
Army	Warrant Officer Class One Dennis Wayne Bowman	For meritorious service to the Australian Army as Regimental Sergeant Major of 4th Field Regiment, and as Regimental Master Gunner of the School of Artillery, Royal Australian Artillery	
Army	Warrant Officer Class One Lynette June Gweneth Dowsett	For meritorious service to the Army Reserve as an administrator	
Army	Warrant Officer Class One Mark Drake Dunn	For meritorious service to the Australian Army as Regimental Sergeant Major of the 1st Commando Regiment and the 3rd Battalion, the Royal Australian Regiment	
Army	Warrant Officer Class One Stewart William Purdie	For meritorious service to the Australian Army as the Regimental Sergeant Major of the 25th Battalion, the Royal Queensland Regiment, the 6th Battalion, the Royal Australian Regiment and the 7th Brigade	
Army	Warrant Officer Class One Raymond John Raddatz	For meritorious service to the Australian Army in a broad range of highly demanding appointments in the fields of regimental duties, peacekeeping and defence cooperation	
Air Force	Sergeant John Dunbar	For meritorious service to the Royal Australian Air Force in the development of trade certification and civilian accreditation for the aircraft welder mustering	
Air Force	Warrant Officer Errol James Reidlinger	For meritorious service to the Royal Australian Air Force in the field of transport logistics	
Air Force	Warrant Officer Malcolm William Skilton	For meritorious service to the Royal Australian Air Force in the field of telecommunications management	
