= Australian National Badminton Championships =

Australian National Badminton Championships are officially held since the year 1935. Already eleven years earlier already started the unofficial national championships in Victoria, but a national governing body for badminton was still missing in this time.

== Past winners ==
Year	Men's singles	Women's singles	Men's doubles	Women's doubles	Mixed doubles
1935	Cecil Craske	Mavis Horsburgh	E. Smith; H. Tattersall	E. Crow; J. Badenach	Cecil Craske; Isobel Newman
1936	Tim Thompson	Mavis Horsburgh	Keith Johnstone; George Billing	Ivy Hewett; Eva Robert	Tim Thompson; N. Wing
1937	Cecil Craske	Mavis Horsburgh	Bob Harper; Jack Prior	Ivy Hewett; Eva Robert	Cecil Craske; Beryl Cuthbertson
1938	Allan McCabe	Eva Robert	Bob Harper; Jack Prior	Mavis Horsburgh; Beryl Cuthbertson	Cecil Craske; Beryl Cuthbertson
1939	Allan McCabe	Beryl Cuthbertson	Bob Harper; Jack Prior	Mavis Wray; Beryl Cuthbertson	Tim Thompson; Mavis Wray
1940; 1946	no competition				
1947	Tim Thompson	Eva Robert	Dick Russell; C. Fildes	Ivy Hewett; Eva Robert	Dick Russell; Ethel Peacock
1948	Allan McCabe	Eva Robert	Allan McCabe; Arthur McCabe	Ivy Hewett; Eva Robert	Bert Tonkin; Eva Robert
1949	Allan McCabe	Eva Robert	Allan McCabe; Arthur McCabe	Jean Pullen; Ethel Peacock	Dick Russell; Ethel Peacock
1950	Allan McCabe	Ethel Peacock	Allan McCabe; Arthur McCabe	Betty Barton-Jamieson; Frederica McCorry	Cliff Cutt; Ethel Peacock
1951	Jeff Robson	Eva Robert	Jeff Robson; Bert Tonkin	Peggy Grant; Ethel Peacock	Jeff Robson; Ethel Peacock
1952	Allan McCabe	Ethel Peacock	Lim Ah Soo; Tan Jin Kiat	Thelma Richman; Eva Robert	Cliff Cutt; Eva Robert
1953	Don Murray	Ethel Peacock	Stan Russell; Allan McCabe	Peggy Grant; Ethel Peacock	Allan McCabe; Peggy Grant
1954	Don Murray	Amy Pincott	Cliff Cutt; Ian Hutchinson	Peggy Grant; Margaret Foord	Allan McCabe; Peggy Grant
1955	Ong Eng Hong	Margaret Foord	Don Murray; Stan Russell	June Bevan; Amy Pincott	Stan Russell; Margaret Foord
1956	Ong Eng Hong	June Bevan	Ong Eng Hong; See Chin Leong	June Bevan; Amy Pincott	Don Murray; June Bevan
1957	Ong Eng Hong	Margaret Russell	Ong Eng Hong; See Chin Leong	June Bevan; Amy Pincott	Don Murray; June Bevan
1958	Ken Turner	Margaret Russell	C. Aw; E. Kok	June Turnbull; June Smailes	Ken Turner; A. Atkins
1959	Ron Young	B. Tan	J. S. Heng; G. Yeang	E. T. Scott; F. M. Beitzel	G. Yeang; B. Tan
1960	Ong Eng Hong	June Bevan	Ong Soo Kit; Andrew Ong	June Bevan; June Turnbull	Don Murray; June Bevan
1961	Ong Eng Hong	Joy Twining	Ong Soo Kit; Andrew Ong	June Bevan; June Walsh	Stan Russell; Margaret Russell
1962	Ong Eng Hong	Joy Twining	Ken Turner; B. Welch	June Bevan; June Walsh	Ken Turner; Turner
1963	Ron Young	Joy Twining	Cliff Cutt; Ian Hutchinson	Judy Smith; E. Dimbleby	Ron Young; Helen Young
1964	Ken Turner	Kay Nesbit	Ken Turner; B. Welch	June Bevan; Judy Smith	Ken Turner; Dulcie King
1965	Jon Chin	Kay Nesbit	Jon Chin; George Robotham	Kay Nesbit; Jan Horton	Ken Turner; Dulcie King
1966	Andrew Ong	Kay Nesbit	Graeme Nelson; Andrew Ong	Joy Twining; Jane Griffiths	Ken Turner; Dulcie King
1967	Michael Rawlings	Kay Nesbit	Jon Chin; Michael Rawlings	Kay Nesbit; Jan Horton	Christopher Hardwick; Kay Nesbit
1968	John Compton	Kay Nesbit	Donald Cory; Ricky Irwin	Kay Nesbit; Jan Horton	Christopher Hardwick; Kay Nesbit
1969	Ross Livingston	Judy Nyirati	David Hoppen; Ron Young	Kay Nesbit; Cheryl Mullett	David Hoppen; Cheryl Mullett
1970	Ross Livingston	Judy Nyirati	David Hoppen; M. Lockwood	G. Genders; Beverly Hite	Ross Livingston; Beverly Hite
1971; 1981	no data				
1982	Paul Kong	Maxine Evans	Trevor James; Paul Kong	Julie McDonald; Maxine Evans	Michael Scandolera; Maxine Evans
1983; 1988	no data				
1989	Sze Yu	Anna Lao	Peter Blackburn; Gordon Lang	Teresa Lian; Anna Lao	He Tim; Anna Lao
1990	Ardy Wiranata	Susi Susanti	Jalani Sidek; Razif Sidek	Rhonda Cator; Anna Lao	He Tim; Anna Lao
1991	He Tim	Anna Lao	Chan Siu Kwong; Ng Pak Kum	Rhonda Cator; Anna Lao	He Tim; Anna Lao
1992	Eddy Kurniawan	Song Yang	Peter Blackburn; Mark Nichols	Amanda Hardy; Lisa Campbell	Ong Beng Teong; Wendy Shinners
1993	He Tim	Song Yang	Peter Blackburn; Mark Nichols	Amanda Hardy; Lisa Campbell	Mark Nichols; Amanda Hardy
1994	Jefry Tjoandi	Lisa Campbell	Peter Blackburn; Mark Nichols	Wendy Shinners; Song Yang	Mark Nichols; Amanda Hardy
1995	Paul Stevenson	Lisa Campbell	Peter Blackburn; Paul Staight	Amanda Hardy; Rhonda Cator	Paul Stevenson; Amanda Hardy
1996	Tam Kai Chuen	Lisa Campbell	Chow Kin Man; Ma Che Kong	Kennie Asuncion; Amparo Lim	Peter Blackburn; Rhonda Cator
1997	Ng Wei	Li Feng	David Bamford; Peter Blackburn	Tammy Jenkins; Rhona Robertson	Murray Hocking; Lisa Campbell
1998	Rio Suryana	Michaela Smith	David Bamford; Peter Blackburn	Rhonda Cator; Amanda Hardy	Peter Blackburn; Rhonda Cator
2003	Stuart Brehaut	Renuga Veeran	Travis Denney; Ashley Brehaut	Renuga Veeran; Susan Wang	Raj Veeran; Renuga Veeran
2005	Stuart Brehaut	Kellie Lucas	Travis Denney; Boyd Cooper	Kellie Lucas; Kate Wilson-Smith	Travis Denney; Kate Wilson-Smith
2006	Stuart Gomez	Tania Luiz	Ben Walklate; Ashley Brehaut	Margot Strehlan; Kate Wilson-Smith	Ross Smith; Tania Luiz
2007	Ashley Moss	Leanne Choo	Wes Caulkett; Michael Chappell	Leanne Choo; Kate Wilson-Smith	Chad Whitehead; Kate Wilson-Smith
2008	Jeff Tho	Leanne Choo	Ben Walklate; Ashley Brehaut	Leanne Choo; Kate Wilson-Smith	Chad Whitehead; Kate Wilson-Smith
2009	Nicholas Kidd	Renuga Veeran	Ben Walklate; Glenn Warfe	Erin Carroll; Renuga Veeran	Ben Walklate; Kate Wilson-Smith
2010	Nicholas Kidd	Leisha Cooper	Saliya Gunaratne; Chad Whitehead	Kate Wilson-Smith; Leanne Choo	Andrew Surman; Kate Wilson-Smith
2011	Nicholas Kidd	Michelle Zhang	Wee Ung Hii; Chris Ong	Ann-Louise Slee; Michelle Zhang	Nicholas Kidd; Talia Saunders
2012	Wesley Caulkett	Wendy Chen	Guy Gibson; Raymond Tam	Wendy Chen; Hsieh Chia-Ju	Raymond Tam; Susan Wang
2013	Oon Hoe Keat	Verdet Kessler	Wesley Caulkett; Mitchell Wheller	Louisa Ma; Natasha Sharp	Luke Chong; Talia Saunders
2014	Oon Hoe Keat	Verdet Kessler	Luke Chong; Joel Findlay	Verdet Kessler; Joy Lai	Luke Chong; Talia Saunders
2015	Ashwant Gobinathan	Joy Lai	Rizwan Azam; Michael Fariman	Tiffany Ho; Elena Yee-Man Kwok	Stuart Rowlands; Talia Saunders
2016	Anthony Joe	Joy Lai	Matthew Chau; Sawan Serasinghe	Setyana Mapasa; Gronya Somerville	Sawan Serasinghe; Setyana Mapasa
2017	Anthony Joe	Chen Hsuan-yu	Rizwan Azam; Kenneth Choo	Setyana Mapasa; Gronya Somerville	Sawan Serasinghe; Setyana Mapasa
2018	Reuze Yan	Jinjing Qin	Rizwan Azam; Kenneth Choo	Ann-Louise Slee; Renuga Veeran	Runze Yan; Jinjing Qin
2019	Jacob Schueler	Jiang Yingzi	Matthew Chau; Lim Ming Chuen	Setyana Mapasa; Gronya Somerville	Simon Leung; Gronya Somerville
2020	Lin Yingxiang	Wendy Chen	Lim Ming Chuen; Pham Tran Hoang	Victoria He; Angela Yu	Lin Yingxiang; Khoo Lee Yen
2021	No competition				
2022	Jacob Schueler	Wendy Chen	Rizky Hidayat Ismail; Tran Hoang Pham	Kaitlyn Ea; Gronya Somerville	Kenneth Choo; Gronya Somerville
2023	Ricky Tang	Tiffany Ho	Rizky Hidayat Ismail; Frengky Wijaya Putra	Sylvinna Kurniawan; Setyana Mapasa	Rizky Hidayat Ismail; Setyana Mapasa
2024	Jack Yu	Tiffany Ho	Rizky Hidayat Ismail; Frengky Wijaya Putra	Setyana Mapasa; Angela Yu	Rizky Hidayat Ismail; Setyana Mapasa
2025	Muhammad Rafi Zafran Ferary	Tiffany Ho	Rizky Hidayat Ismail; Frengky Wijaya Putra	Gronya Somerville; Angela Yu	Andika Ramadiansyah; Nozomi Shimizu
