= 1980 FIS Freestyle Ski World Cup =

Freestyle skiing competitive season

Freestyle Skiing World Cup 1980
Discipline	Men	Women
Overall	(Canada) Greg Athans	(Canada) Stephanie Sloan
Moguls	(Canada) Greg Athans	(United States) Hilary English
Aerials	(Canada) John Eaves	(Canada) Lauralee Bowie
Ballet	(United States) Bob Howard	(United States) Jan Bucher
Combined	(Canada) Greg Athans	(Canada) Stephanie Sloan

Competition
Locations	4	4
Individual	20	20

The 1980 FIS Freestyle Skiing World Cup was the first World Cup season in freestyle skiing organised by International Ski Federation. The season started on 7 January 1980 and ended on 30 March 1980. This season included four disciplines: aerials, moguls, ballet and combined.

== Men ==
=== Moguls ===
Num	Season	Date	Place	Event	Winner	Second	Third
1	1	7 January 1980	(United States) Poconos	MO	(Canada) Greg Athans	(France) Nano Pourtier	(United States) Steve Rezendes
2	2	8 January 1980	(United States) Poconos	MO	(Canada) Greg Athans	(France) Nano Pourtier	(United States) Stuart O'Brein
3	3	1 March 1980	(West Germany) Oberjoch	MO	(Austria) Sigi Innauer	(France) Nano Pourtier	(Canada) Bill Keenan
4	4	12 March 1980	(France) Tignes	MO	(West Germany) Franz Garhammer	(United States) Frank Beddor	(United States) Bruce Bolesky
5	5	28 March 1980	(Canada) Whistler	MO	(Austria) Sigi Innauer	(West Germany) Franz Garhammer	(United States) Scott Brooksbank

=== Ballet ===
Num	Season	Date	Place	Event	Winner	Second	Third
1	1	9 January 1980	(United States) Poconos	AC	(United States) Bob Howard	(Canada) Bob Turgeon	(United States) Scott Brooksbank
2	2	10 January 1980	(United States) Poconos	AC	(United States) Bob Howard	(Canada) Greg Athans	(United States) Frank Beddor
3	3	1 March 1980	(West Germany) Oberjoch	AC	(United States) Bob Howard	(West Germany) Ernst Garhammer	(Germany) Hermann Reitberger
4	4	13 March 1980	(France) Tignes	AC	(United States) Bob Howard	(United States) Ian Edmondson	(United States) Scott Brooksbank
5	5	29 March 1980	(Canada) Whistler	AC	(United States) Bob Howard	(West Germany) Ernst Garhammer	(United States) Bruce Bolesky

=== Aerials ===
Num	Season	Date	Place	Event	Winner	Second	Third
1	1	11 January 1980	(United States) Poconos	AE	(Canada) John Eaves	(Switzerland) Freddy Wirth	(Canada) Jean Corriveau
2	2	12 January 1980	(United States) Poconos	AE	(Canada) Craig Clow	(Canada) John Eaves	(United Kingdom) Mike Nemesvary
3	3	2 March 1980	(West Germany) Oberjoch	AE	(Switzerland) Freddy Wirth	(United States) Jeff Chumas	(Canada) John Eaves
4	4	15 March 1980	(France) Tignes	AE	(Canada) Jean Corriveau	(Canada) John Eaves	(Canada) Dominique LaRoche
5	5	30 March 1980	(Canada) Whistler	AE	(Canada) Craig Clow	(Canada) Jean Corriveau	(Canada) Rick Bowie

=== Combined ===
Num	Season	Date	Place	Event	Winner	Second	Third
1	1	11 January 1980	(United States) Poconos	CO	(Canada) Greg Athans	(United States) Scott Brooksbank	(Canada) Rick Bowie
2	2	12 January 1980	(United States) Poconos	CO	(Canada) Greg Athans	(United States) Frank Beddor	(United States) Scott Brooksbank
3	3	2 March 1980	(West Germany) Oberjoch	CO	(United States) Framk Beddor	(Canada) John Eaves	(Canada) Greg Athans
4	4	15 March 1980	(France) Tignes	CO	(Canada) Greg Athans	(Canada) Rick Bowie	(United States) Scott Brooksbank
5	5	30 March 1980	(Canada) Whistler	CO	(Canada) Murray Cluff	(Canada) Rick Bowie	(Canada) John Eaves

== Ladies ==
=== Moguls ===
Num	Season	Date	Place	Event	Winner	Second	Third
1	1	7 January 1980	(United States) Poconos	MO	(United States) Kay Kucera	(Canada) Lisa Downing	(West Germany) Hedy Garhammer
2	2	8 January 1980	(United States) Poconos	MO	(United States) Hilary English	(Canada) Stephanie Sloan	(West Germany) Hedy Garhammer
3	3	1 March 1980	(West Germany) Oberjoch	MO	(United States) Hilary English	(Switzerland) Erika Gallizzi	(Canada) Stephanie Sloan
4	4	12 March 1980	(France) Tignes	MO	(United States) Kay Kucera	(Canada) Stephanie Sloan	information is not available
5	5	28 March 1980	(Canada) Whistler	MO	(United States) Hilary English	(United States) Kay Kucera	(Canada) Stephanie Sloan

=== Ballet ===
Num	Season	Date	Place	Event	Winner	Second	Third
1	1	9 January 1980	(United States) Poconos	AC	(United States) Jan Bucher	(Canada) Stephanie Sloan	(West Germany) Susi Schmidl
2	2	10 January 1980	(United States) Poconos	AC	(United States) Jan Bucher	(Canada) Stephanie Sloan	(France) Christine Rossi
3	3	1 March 1980	(West Germany) Oberjoch	AC	(United States) Jan Bucher	(France) Christine Rossi	information is not available
4	4	13 March 1980	(France) Tignes	AC	(United States) Jan Bucher	(France) Christine Rossi	information is not available
5	5	29 March 1980	(Canada) Whistler	AC	(United States) Jan Bucher	(France) Christine Rossi	information is not available

=== Aerials ===
Num	Season	Date	Place	Event	Winner	Second	Third
1	1	11 January 1980	(United States) Poconos	AE	information is not available	(Canada) Stephanie Sloan	(Canada) Lauralee Bowie
2	2	12 January 1980	(United States) Poconos	AE	(Canada) Renee Lee Smith	(Canada) Stephanie Sloan	(Canada) Lisa Downing
3	3	2 March 1980	(West Germany) Oberjoch	AE	(Canada) Lauralee Bowie	information is not available	(United States) Mary Beddor
4	4	15 March 1980	(France) Tignes	AE	(United States) Mary Beddor	(Canada) Lauralee Bowie	information is not available
5	5	30 March 1980	(Canada) Whistler	AE	(Canada) Lauralee Bowie	(Canada) Renee Lee Smith	(United States) Mary Beddor

=== Combined ===
Num	Season	Date	Place	Event	Winner	Second	Third
1	1	11 January 1980	(United States) Poconos	CO	(Canada) Stephanie Sloan	(Canada) Lauralee Bowie	(Canada) Renee Lee Smith
2	2	12 January 1980	(United States) Poconos	CO	(Canada) Stephanie Sloan	(Canada) Renee Lee Smith	(Canada) Lauralee Bowie
3	3	2 March 1980	(West Germany) Oberjoch	CO	(Canada) Stephanie Sloan	information is not available	(United States) Janice Reid
4	4	15 March 1980	(France) Tignes	CO	information is not available	information is not available	(United States) Janice Reid
5	5	30 March 1980	(Canada) Whistler	CO	information is not available	(Canada) Lauralee Bowie	(Canada) Stephanie Sloan

== Men's standings ==
=== Overall ===
Rank		Points
1	(Canada) Greg Athans	270
2	(United States) Scott Brooksbank	228
3	(Canada) Rick Bowie	227
4	(United States) Frank Beddor	222
5	(Canada) John Eaves	202

- Standings after 20 races.

=== Moguls ===
Rank		Points
1	(Canada) Greg Athans	93
2	(Canada) Bill Keenan	82
3	(Austria) Sigi Innauer	72
4	(France) Nano Pourtier	72
5	(United States) Craig Sabina	66

- Standings after 5 races.

=== Aerials ===
Rank		Points
1	(Canada) John Eaves	96
2	(Canada) Jean Corriveau	91
3	(United Kingdom) Mike Nemesvary	85
4	(Switzerland) Freddy Wirth	83
5	(Canada) Rick Bowie	80

- Standings after 5 races.

=== Ballet ===
Rank		Points
1	(United States) Bob Howard	100
2	(West Germany) Ernst Garhammer	92
3	(United States) Lance Lana	82
4	(United States) Steve Rechtschaffner	78
5	(United States) Ian Edmondson	77

- Standings after 5 races.

=== Combined ===
Rank		Points
1	(Canada) Greg Athans	58
2	(Canada) Rick Bowie	52
3	(United States) Scott Brooksbank	52
4	(United States) Frank Beddor	40
5	(Canada) Murray Cluff	40

- Standings after 5 races.

== Ladies' standings ==
=== Overall ===
Rank		Points
1	(Canada) Stephanie Sloan	82
2	(Canada) Lauralee Bowie	58
3	(West Germany) Hedy Garhammer	55
4	(West Germany) Susi Schmidl	44
5	(Canada) Renee Lee Smith	39

- Standings after 20 races.

=== Moguls ===
Rank		Points
1	(United States) Hilary English	29
2	(Canada) Stephanie Sloan	26
3	(United States) Kay Kucera	26
4	(West Germany) Hedy Garhammer	17
5	(Canada) Lisa Downing	10

- Standings after 5 races.

=== Aerials ===
Rank		Points
1	(Canada) Lauralee Bowie	29
2	(West Germany) Susi Schmidl	26
3	(United States) Mary Beddor	20
4	(Canada) Stephanie Sloan	19
5	(Canada) Renee Lee Smith	18

- Standings after 5 races.

=== Ballet ===
Rank		Points
1	(United States) Jan Bucher	36
2	(France) Christine Rossi	26
3	(West Germany) Jutta Poellein	21
4	(Canada) Stephanie Sloan	19
5	(West Germany) Hedy Garhammer	17

- Standings after 5 races.

=== Combined ===
Rank		Points
1	(Canada) Stephanie Sloan	18
2	(West Germany) Hedy Garhammer	13
3	(Canada) Lauralee Bowie	13
4	(West Germany) Susi Schmidl	9
5	(United States) Janice Reid	8

- Standings after 5 races.
