= Paul Parkinson =

Paul Parkinson may refer to:

- Paul Parkinson (Scouting)
- Paul Bonifacio Parkinson (born 1991), Italian-Canadian figure skater
- Paul Parkinson (athlete), Sierra Leonean sprinter
