= Bob Francis (radio presenter) =

Australian radio personality (1939-2016)

- Born: Robert Neville Francis; 11 March 1939; Cairo, Egypt
- Died: 12 November 2016 (aged 77); North Adelaide, South Australia
- Education: Prince Alfred College
- Occupation: Talkback radio presenter
- Employer: 5AA
- Spouse: Anne Novikov (1962-1983) Anna Von Berg (2006–2016; his death)
- Children: Mark Francis, Rebecca Francis

Robert Neville Francis OAM (11 March 1939 – 12 November 2016) was an Egyptian-born Australian radio presenter and talk back host in Adelaide. He is remembered for his activism in getting the organisers of The Beatles' tour of 1964 to reverse their decision to bypass Adelaide.

== Life and career ==
Francis was born in Cairo, Egypt, in 1939.

In the early 1960s Francis was employed by radio 5AD as a disk jockey and on weekends as MC at several rock 'n' roll dance venues.

In early 1964, when "Beatlemania" had swept much of the world, the promoters Aztec Services found themselves unexpectedly with a "hot property" on their hands, having long before booked "The Beatles" in a package with several other up-and-coming English bands. Determined to make the most from their windfall, their itinerary was restricted to the East Coast. Francis responded to the demands of Adelaide teenagers and, together with Jim Slade of 5DN and Warwick Prime and Roger Dowsett of 5KA, began campaigning for an Adelaide concert. As a result of their efforts, a petition with 80,000 signatures was presented to the promoter, Ken Brodziak, who organised a two-day stopover in Adelaide for the band, with added concerts arranged for the Centennial Hall, Wayville showgrounds. Francis flew to Sydney on 11 June 1964 and flew back to Adelaide with The Beatles the following day. The Bay Road was crowded with onlookers as the cavalcade passed, and masses of fans were congregated on King William Street when Francis and the "Fab Four" (Note: "Ringo" Starr missed the Adelaide concerts; his place was taken by another drummer, Jimmie Nicol.) appeared on the balcony of the Adelaide Town Hall.

Francis became one of the first talkback radio hosts in Adelaide; Older listeners remember his on-air partnership with Andy Thorpe in the late sixties to mid-seventies on radio 5AD.

Francis hosted his own radio show on 5AA from 1985 to 2013 and was the station's longest serving employee. He completed 50 years in radio. His program aired between 8pm and 12 midnight on weekdays and was rated as Adelaide's most popular talk back program. Until August 2013, Francis hosted his radio program from 8 pm to midnight every weekday, commanding between 24 and 28 per cent of the evening radio audience.

In July 2013, it was announced that Francis was to retire at the end of that year. The following month he announced that he would retire from broadcasting on 8 August 2013 after 57 years. A variety of radio, television, media, and music celebrities expressed their appreciation towards his career through taped segments being aired during his last week of broadcast.

Francis was made famous to the rest of Australia through the ABC TV show The Chaser's War on Everything when one member of the Chaser team rang him to question 5AA reporters as they were not at the "Subway Fresh Bread" press conference which was actually just a commercial. Because of his temper, he was a constant target for prank calls, such as one featuring on John Safran's show. These clips have appeared on the video sharing site YouTube.

In 2005, Francis was inducted into the Australian Radio Hall of fame at the Australian Commercial Radio Awards held at the Sydney Convention Centre. The award recognises outstanding lifetime achievement and contribution to the radio broadcasting industry. After receiving the award, he said: "This is one of the greatest honours I can imagine, to me like winning an Academy Award." He was also presented with a Golden Microphone from 5AA for 20 years service.

Francis regularly expressed his extreme dislike for the tax payer funded Australian Broadcasting Corporation (ABC). In the final two ratings periods of 2012 Francis was beaten by ABC radio's Peter Goers.

In July 2013, Francis announced that he would be retiring from radio at the end of the year after talks with 5AA management. He told the Sunday Mail, "I just decided I wasn't really enjoying coming into work each day anymore." He made his last broadcast, which included many messages from well-wishers and ended with Francis in tears, on 8 August 2013.

Francis died on 12 November 2016 at the age of 77.

== Recognition ==
Francis was awarded the Medal of the Order of Australia (OAM) in the 1998 Australia Day Honours for "service to the community, particularly through supporting charitable organisations which seek to help young people, and to the media in the area of talk-back radio."

== Controversies ==
One of his most controversial acts, also believed to have been one of the most controversial acts by any Australian talk show radio host, occurred on 27 September 2005 whilst talking to an elderly female listener. Francis spoke arrogantly to her, referring to her as a "stupid old lady" and repeatedly calling her a "dickbrain". The way he spoke and treated the elderly listener made headlines, and was even featured on Media Watch two weeks later. Francis refused to say sorry over the incident, saying "I loved it. If it was taken in context, she had a go at me. She was being nasty" and that "If she rang again, I'd do the same thing".

In February 2005, 5AA were found guilty by the country's peak broadcasting regulator, regarding comments made in regard to aboriginals on Francis' program. It is unknown who made the comments or what the comments were, just that they were likely to have incited or perpetuated hatred against Aboriginal people on the basis of their race. The station issued an apology over the incident.

In October 2005, Francis was involved in a legal issue after making inflammatory comments about a senior magistrate, Gary Gumpl. live on-air while commenting on a case involving Robert John Walker who had been charged with one count of possessing child pornography. Francis described Gumpl's decision to hear a bail application as "irresponsible" and made comments such as "Am I here as a normal bloody human being, or do judges live in another world?" and "Oh, smash the judge's face in." He later issued a public apology.

Despite the apology, Francis had to appear in court over the comments and pleaded guilty to one count of bringing a judicial officer into contempt or lowering his authority. In August 2006, Francis was found guilty for the comments he made, being sentenced to jail for nine weeks and fined $20,000 on a suspended sentence on the condition that he enter an 18-month good behaviour bond.

After being found guilty, Francis and the radio station faced a defamation lawsuit from Gumpl, the magistrate who Francis' comments were directed at. He accepted an offer of "around $60,000" which was paid by 5AA. Gumpl said that incident had caused him considerable stress and hardship and he was pleased it had been finalised. After the incident, Francis was banned from drinking alcohol on air, as he occasionally took a bottle of red wine into the studio to drink while taking calls, and could have been partly responsible for his outbursts.

In 2007, Francis was involved in an accident in which he broke his leg after falling off his scooter trying to avoid a dog. The accident resulted in surgery and two rods in his legs and a pin in his knee. It was later revealed that he was drink-driving and well over the legal limit at the time of the accident. He later called himself a "bloody idiot" and said that the only reason he was drinking was because his boss offered him an ongoing contract.

On 7 June 2012, Francis was suspended for a month by 5AA following comments made about asylum seekers four days earlier. he said "Bugger the boat people, as far as I'm concerned, I hope they bloody drown on their way out here. In my opinion, they are not welcome here." Francis later verbally attacked a journalist who had reported the incident saying "Can you believe that bloody bitch in The Australian ... Some smart-arse dickhead woman ... wrote me up in the paper this morning." When asked by the paper why he had made the comments he remarked "because I felt like it" and told them to "get fucked". He was condemned by fellow 5AA presenters Keith Conlon and Amanda Blair over the incident.
