= Peter Blatch =

Australian scouter

- Born: 17 September 1953 (age 73); Brisbane
- Occupations: Educator, principal and senior executive officer
- Known for: One of 12 elected volunteer members of the World Scout Committee

Peter Blatch AM of Brisbane, Australia (born 17 September 1953) and was one of 12 elected volunteer members of the World Scout Committee (2014-2017; 2017-2021), the main executive body of the World Organization of the Scout Movement.

== Background ==
Blatch has a Master of Education Studies and a Master of Educational Administration from The University of Queensland, worked at Education Queensland as an educator, principal and is a Senior Executive Officer with the Queensland Government in special education and disability services. He is married with two adult children and five grandchildren.

Blatch is National Project Commissioner with Scouts Australia. In this volunteer role, he coordinates a variety of activities including adventure, special needs activities, scholarships and Adults in Scouting projects. He is an executive member of the Educational Methods Committee which reports to the World Scout Committee. He was previously National Commissioner for Adult Training and Development, and continues as a Queensland Branch Adviser in Adult Training and Development.

Blatch started as a Cub and progressed through all youth sections to become a Scout leader. He has Wood Badges in the Scout and adult sections. He has been involved in the Brisbane Gang Show for 35 years, 11 of those as producer. His interests in people with a disability and Scouting led him to start Agoonoree camps in Australia, where Scouts invite youth with disabilities to experience Scouting activities. These Agoonoree camps have been in operation in three state branches since the 1980s. Each year Scouts Queensland and Guides Queensland invite about 70 children as guests to participate in a week long camp at Baden-Powell Park, Samford, Queensland.

In 1998, his services to youth and Scouting were recognised when he received the Medal of the Order of Australia. In 2024 his services to scouting and education were recognised within becoming a Member of the Order of Australia. In 2004 he was awarded Scouts Australia's Silver Kangaroo for eminent achievement and meritorious service. In 2021 he received the Bronze Wolf from the World Organisation of the Scout Movement.

== See also ==
- Extension Scouting
