= Andy Thorpe =

Australian model and radio presenter

- Born: 17 November 1929; Melbourne, Australia
- Died: 15 October 2010 (aged 80); Riverton, South Australia
- Presenting career
- Station: 5AD 5AD 2SM 3DB
- Style: Co-host
- Country: Australia

Andrena "Andy" Thorpe (17 November 1929, in Melbourne, Australia – 15 October 2010, in Riverton, South Australia), was a former model and radio personality who worked at several Australian radio stations in the 1960s and 1970s. She is remembered most for her long running partnership with Bob Francis.

She was a successful model in Melbourne modelling for noted photographers such as Helmut Newton and Athol Smith. In 1952 she won the "Camera Model of the Year" and in 1953 she was crowned "Queen of the Southern Beaches" and won a trip to Europe which proved to be a powerful influence on her. In She moved to Adelaide to open a school for models and married businessman Tony Gwynn-Jones. She was encouraged to work in radio after being spotted at a dinner party when outspoken women were still a rarity in Adelaide at that time. She was offered a morning chat program at Adelaide's 5DN with Lionel Williams. In 1966 she moved to 5AD she was initially paired with Rob Lynch although after a couple of seasons she was paired with the conservative Bob Francis. Despite a frosty start the pair came to work very well on air with a fiery 'odd couple' relationship that was a ratings hit for almost a decade.

Andy left 5AD in 1976 and took a break from radio that involved extensive travels in India and a flight in a cropduster from Adelaide to London.

Returning to Australia she worked in Melbourne for 3DB and 3RRR and in Sydney with 2SM as well as with ABC Radio in Adelaide. She moved into public relations, working for the South Australian Museum and the Victorian Tourism Commission for former South Australian premier Don Dunstan.
