= Bayswater Brook =

Drainage network in Perth, Western Australia

Coordinates: 31.931203°S 115.926064°E

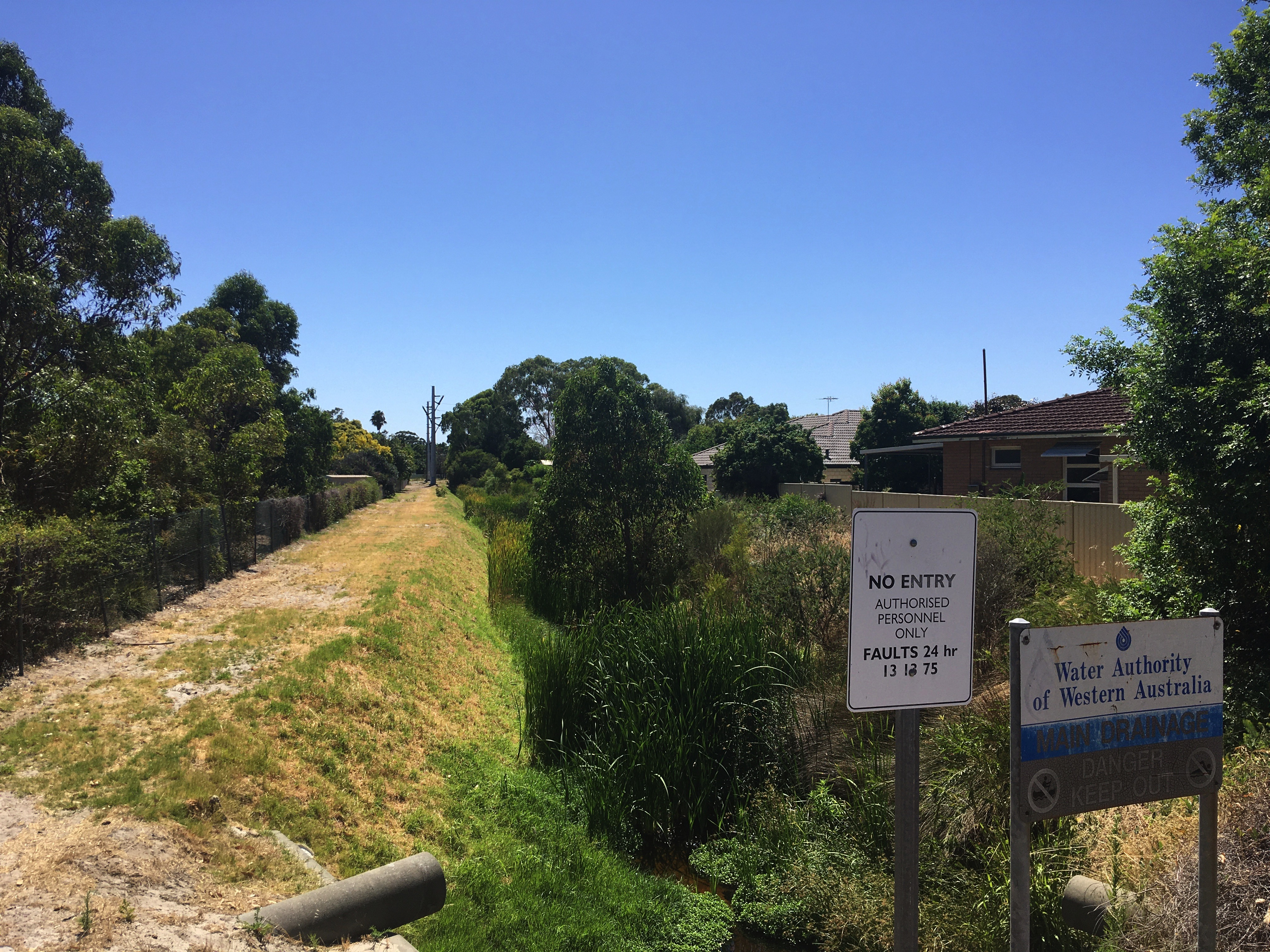
Bayswater Brook at Coode Street, Bayswater

Bayswater Brook (formerly known as the Bayswater Main Drain) is a drainage network in the north-eastern suburbs of Perth, Western Australia, that discharges into the Swan River in the suburb of Bayswater. In the 1920s, due to urban development, a natural brook called Bayswater Brook was turned into a network of drainage channels, which are partially covered and partially open. The original name of the brook has since been resumed for the network.

== Description ==
The network's water source is runoff and groundwater. In the 1970s, the Eric Singleton Bird Sanctuary was built near the mouth of the network. Water from the Bayswater Brook flows through the wetlands at the bird sanctuary before continuing to the Swan River. It has an average annual flow of 7.5 gigalitres (260 million cubic feet).

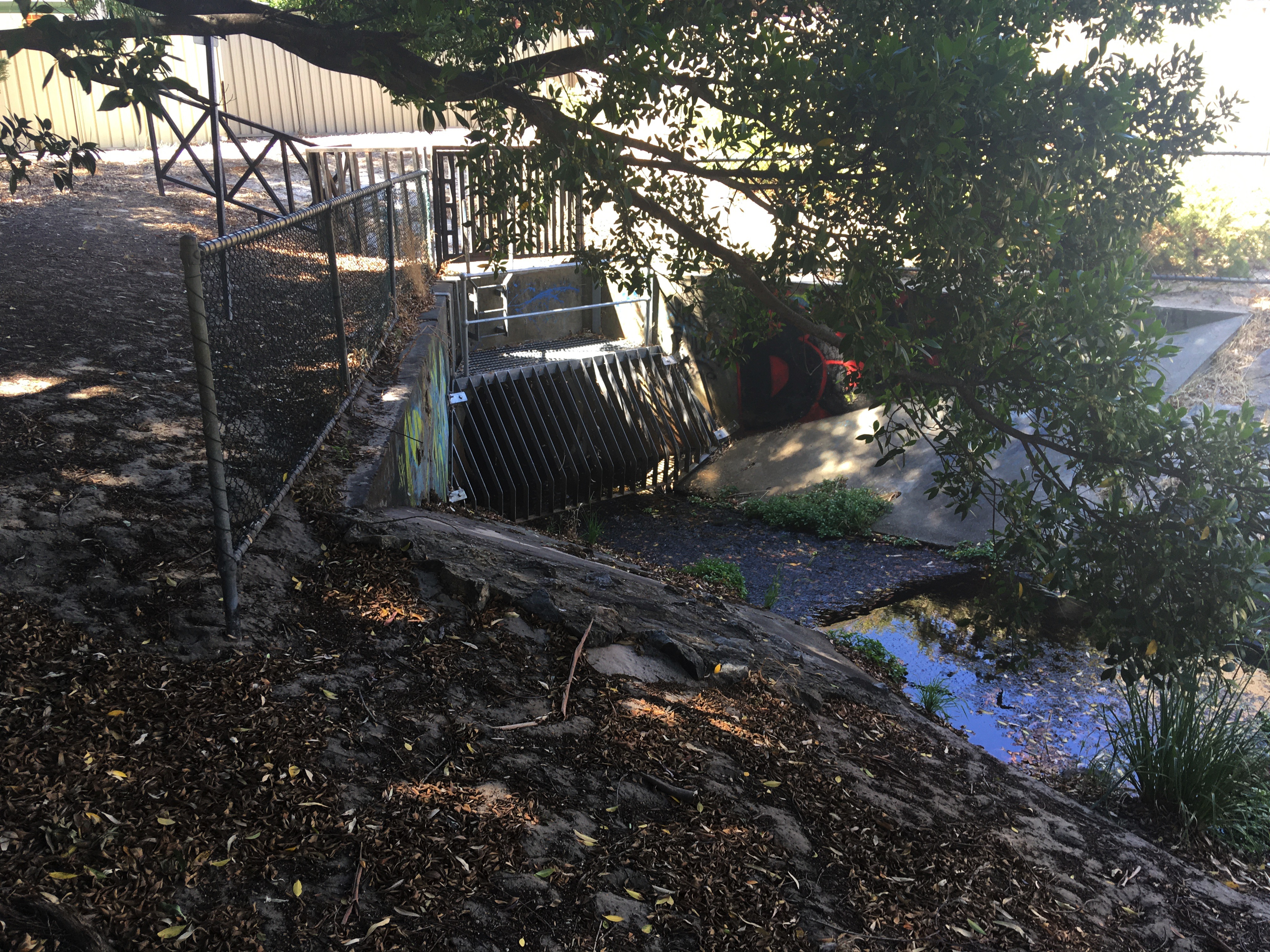
Patterson Street Reserve, where Bayswater Brook enters an underground section

The Bayswater Brook catchment is the largest urban catchment in the Perth metropolitan area, with an area of 27 square kilometres (10 sq mi). The suburbs which are in the catchment area are Bassendean, Bayswater, Bedford, Dianella, Eden Hill, Morley and Noranda. There are several lakes and parks along the Bayswater Brook. They include Browns Lake Reserve, Nora Hughes Park and Russell Street Park in Morley, and Waverley Pola Reserve in Dianella.

The Bayswater Brook is the fifth highest contributor of nutrients into the Swan–Canning river system. The catchment area is on Bassendean Sands, which are poor at keeping nutrients. In 2015, the Eric Singleton Bird Sanctuary underwent a rehabilitation project to reduce the amount of nutrients and rubbish entering the Swan River from the Bayswater Brook.

The City of Bayswater is working to create "living streams" and "micro wetlands" along the Bayswater Brook in order to improve water quality, attract wildlife and create new public open space. The City of Bayswater won an award in the 2018 Local Government Honour Awards for this.
