= Greg Athans =

Canadian freestyle skier

Personal information
- Nationality: Canadian
- Born: June 18, 1955
- Died: August 8, 2006 (aged 51)

Greg Athans (18 June 1955–8 August 2006) was a Canadian freestyle skier competing from 1976 to 1986 winning titles in multiple disciplines. Athans was also Canadian national waterskiing champion on fifteen occasions. He competed in the Canada Games, winning gold medals in the alpine slalom in 1971, and water skiing in 1973, becoming the first athlete to win gold medals at both the summer and winter games. In 1981, he was the best all-round competitor at the 1980 FIS Freestyle Ski World Cup, winning the World Cup Grand Prix Award. He retired in 1982.

Athans published a book, Ski Free, detailing step-by-step instructions on how to perform freestyle moves.

Athans died as a result of complications from diabetes. He was inducted posthumously into the British Columbia Sports Hall of Fame in 2014.

== Results ==
=== FIS World Cup podiums ===
Date	Location	Discipline	Position
18 March 1981	Mt. Norquay, Canada	Moguls	2
14 March 1981	Poconos, USA	Acro	3
15 February 1981	Oberjoch, Germany	Combined	2
14 February 1981	Oberjoch, Germany	Moguls	2
9 February 1981	Seefeld, Austria	Combined	2
4 February 1981	Laax, Switzerland	Moguls	2
3 February 1981	Laax, Switzerland	Combined	3
22 January 1981	Tignes, France	Moguls	3
17 January 1981	Livigno, Italy	Acro	3
15 March 1980	Tignes, France	Combined	1
2 March 1980	Oberjoch, Germany	Combined	3
12 January 1980	Poconos, USA	Combined	1
11 January 1980	Poconos, USA	Combined	1
10 January 1980	Poconos, USA	Acro	2
8 January 1980	Poconos, USA	Moguls	1
7 January 1980	Poconos, USA	Moguls	1

== Works ==
- Athans, Greg (1978). Ski Free. Photos by Allan de la Plante. New York: E.P. Dutton. ISBN 9780876903223. OCLC 4545808.
