= Maurice Rudd =

Australian trade union official

Name: Maurice Kevin Rudd AM Birth date: 5 November 1942 Death date: 7 February 1998 Occupation: Trade union secretary Spouse: Lesleigh Wade (m. 1 August 1964) Children: Sharon Rudd; Nathan Rudd Nationality: Australian
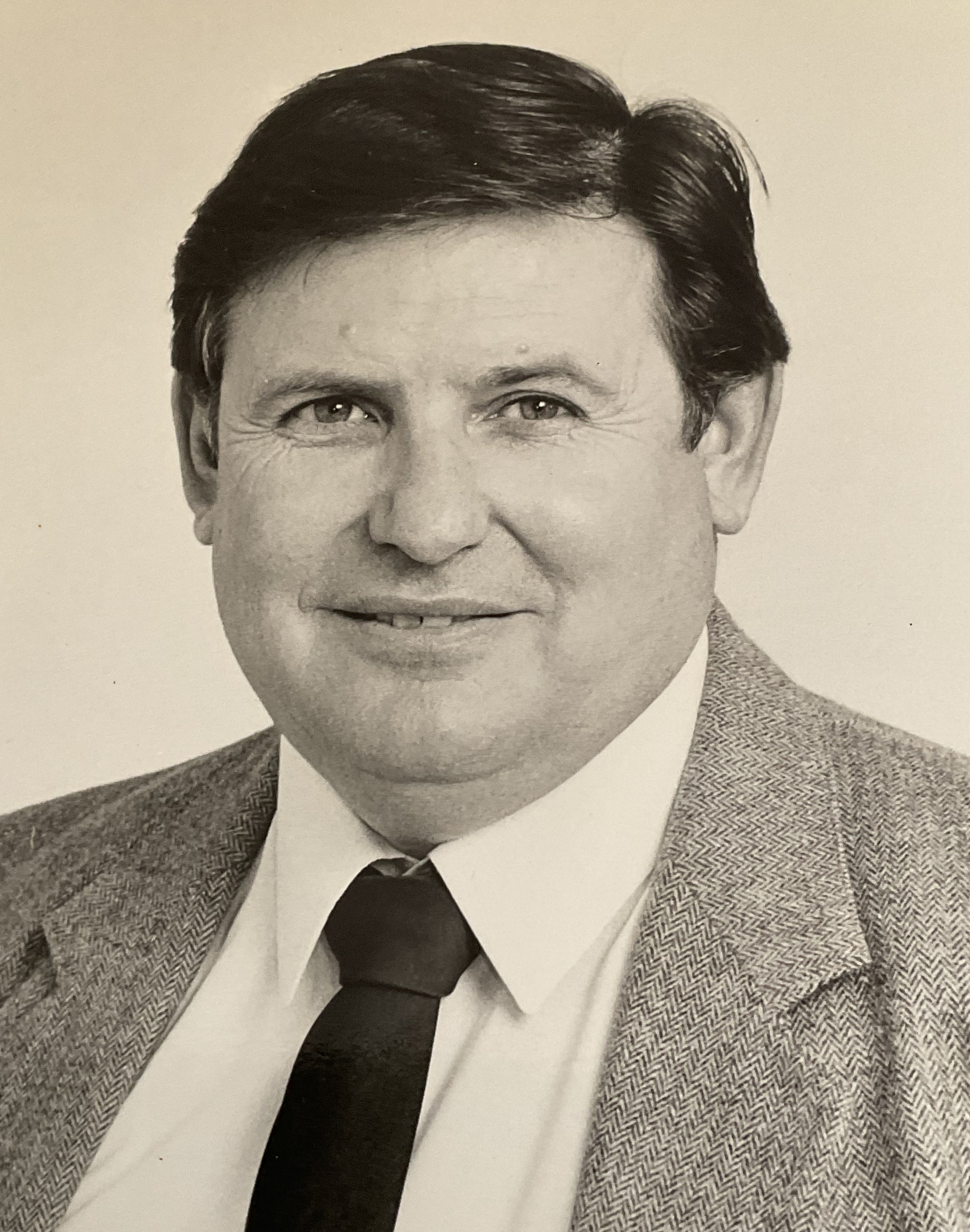
- Political party: Australian Labor Party
- Website: Maurice Kevin Rudd AM

Maurice Kevin Rudd AM (5 November 1942 – 7 February 1998) was an Australian trade union official who served as Secretary of the Newcastle and Northern Regions Branch of the Australian Workers' Union (AWU). He was appointed a Member of the Order of Australia in the 1998 Australia Day Honours List for service to industrial relations, particularly through the Australian Workers' Union.

== Early life and career ==
Rudd commenced work at the Newcastle Steelworks in 1970 and became involved in trade union representation through the Federated Ironworkers' Association. He was elected as a union delegate and later served as BHP Sub-Branch Secretary.

== Trade union leadership ==
In 1976, Rudd was elected BHP Sub-Branch Secretary of the Federated Ironworkers' Association, a position he held until 1984. He later became a full-time National Organiser and was elected Assistant Branch Secretary in 1987. In 1989, he was elected Branch Secretary. Following the amalgamation of the Federated Ironworkers' Association with the Australian Workers' Union in 1990, he served as Secretary of the Newcastle and Northern Regions Branch of the AWU.

During the restructuring of the Australian steel industry and the period leading up to the closure of the Newcastle steelworks, Rudd represented workers in negotiations and industrial advocacy. His leadership role was reported in The Newcastle Herald.

== Honours ==
Rudd was appointed a Member of the Order of Australia (AM) in the 1998 Australia Day Honours List, "For service to industrial relations, particularly through the Australian Workers' Union."

== Death and legacy ==
Rudd died on 7 February 1998 following a battle with cancer. Rudd was predeceased by his wife, Lesleigh Rudd.

Tributes were paid by political and union leaders, including references published on the official website of the Office of the Prime Minister and Cabinet.

An annual industrial relations memorial lunch honouring Rudd is held by the Industrial Relations Society of New South Wales.
