= Silver Kangaroo Award =

High ranking Scouts Australia award

Silver Kangaroo
- Owner: Scouts Australia
- Awarded for: Outstanding service to Scouting in Australia

The Silver Kangaroo is the highest award for adult leaders in Scouts Australia. It is awarded by the Chief Scout of Australia, on the recommendation of the Chief Commissioner of Australia. It is awarded for eminent achievement and meritorious service to the Association for a period of at least twenty years. It may be awarded to any member of a Scout Association affiliated with the World Organization of the Scout Movement.

The award consists of a medallion depicting a stylized silver kangaroo, suspended from a gold ribbon with two green stripes worn around the neck. The attendant uniform emblem, worn over the pocket, consists of a gold knot on a dark green background.

== Recipients ==
Notable recipients include John Ravenhall, Peter Blatch, Paul Parkinson, and A. Geoffrey Lee.

== See also ==
- Bronze Wolf of World Scout Committee
- Silver Wolf of The Scout Association
- Silver Wolf of the Norwegian Guide and Scout Association
- Silver Wolf of Scouterna
- Silver Buffalo Award of the Boy Scouts of America
- Order of CúChulainn of Scouting Ireland
- Silver Fish Award of Girl Guides Association
