= John Ravenhall =

Australian commissioner (born c.1941)

John Ravenhall AM

The Scout Association of Australia chief commissioner
- In office 2003–2009

John George Ravenhall AM (born c.1941) of Melbourne, Australia was the Scout Association of Australia's chief commissioner from 2003 to early 2009, a World Organization of the Scout Movement (WOSM) Asia-Pacific committee member and member its training and adult resources committees.

In 1962, he became a Rover at 2nd Strathmore in Victoria. He was The Scout Association of Australia, Victorian Branch's chief commissioner after being responsible for leader training.

Ravenhall was appointed a Member of the Order of Australia (AM) in the 1998 Australia Day Honours for "service to youth, in particular through the Scout Association and its Leader Training Program".

In 2010, WOSM awarded Ravenhall its 327th Bronze Wolf Award for exceptional services to world Scouting. He also received the Silver Kangaroo.

Ravenhall studied Science, Education and History of Science at the University of Melbourne.
