= Bruce Armstrong (epidemiologist) =

Emeritus Professor Bruce Armstrong AC FAA
- Born: 13 August 1944 (age 82); Geraldton, Western Australia
- Known for: Causes and control of skin cancer

Academic background
- Education: University of Western Australia

Academic work
- Discipline: epidemiology
- Sub-discipline: Public health
- Institutions: University of Sydney

Bruce Konrad Armstrong AC FAA is an Australian cancer and public health researcher. He was a lead advocate for establishing national cancer screening programs in Australia. He is an expert in public health, particularly on the causes and control of skin cancer.

Armstrong was born in Geraldton, Western Australia. He attended Perth Modern School in Perth, Western Australia. He earned a Bachelor of Medical Science, Bachelor of Medicine and Bachelor of Surgery, all at the University of Western Australia. He worked at Royal Perth Hospital and University of Western Australia. He earned a PhD from the University of Oxford and returned to Western Australia. He moved to New South Wales around 1996. He worked at the Sydney Cancer Centre and Cancer Council New South Wales.

He has retired back to Western Australia, although much of his academic life was based in Sydney.

== Awards and honours ==
Armstrong was created a member of the Order of Australia in the 1998 Australia Day Honours. He was awarded a Centenary Medal on 1 January 2001 for service to Australian society and science in epidemiology. He was promoted to Companion of the Order of Australia in the 2026 Australia Day Honours for eminent service to medical research, to environmental and genetic cancer epidemiology, to screening service development, to academia, and to public health administration.

Armstrong was elected as a Fellow of the Australian Academy of Science in 2000.

In 2023, the Cancer Council of Western Australia named its Career Achievement Award after Armstrong.
