= Murray Tobias =

Australian judge (1939–2023)

The Honourable Murray Tobias AM RFD KC

New South Wales Court of Appeal
- In office 28 April 2003 – 25 March 2011

Personal details
- Born: 1939
- Died: 4 March 2023 (aged 83–84)
- Spouse: Colleen (deceased)
- Children: 4
- Occupation: Jurist, barrister

Murray Herbert Tobias, AM, RFD, KC (1939 – 4 March 2023) was an Australian jurist who served as a judge of the Court of Appeal of the Supreme Court of New South Wales from April 2003 to March 2011.

== Education ==
Tobias studied at The Scots College, Sydney. He graduated in law from the University of Sydney, and subsequently attained a BCL from the University of Oxford.

== Career ==
Tobias was appointed Queen's Counsel in 1978. From 1993–95, Tobias was President of the NSW Bar Association.

In 2003, Tobias was appointed a Judge of Appeal of the NSW Court of Appeal and retired in March 2011. He continued to serve as an Acting Judge in Appeal until March 2016.

Tobias was also a member of the Royal Australian Navy Reserve Legal Panel from 1968, retiring as Head of Panel when he turned 60 with the rank of captain. At the time of his retirement he was a Judge Advocate and a Defence Force Magistrate.

Tobias was made a Member of the Order of Australia in the 1998 Australia Day Honours for "service to the legal profession, particularly through the New South Wales and Australian Bar Associations, and to military law".
