= A. Geoffrey Lee =

The Scout Association of Australia's international commissioner

A. Geoffrey Lee AM OAM (1928–2007) was The Scout Association of Australia's international commissioner, as well as the World Organization of the Scout Movement (WOSM) Asia-Pacific committee vice-chairman and then the Lord Baden-Powell Society's committee vice chairman and was involved in organising the 16th World Scout Jamboree.

In 2001, WOSM awarded Lee its 289th Bronze Wolf Award for exceptional services to world Scouting and The Scout Association of Australia awarded him its Silver Kangaroo award.

Lee was a Sea Scout and Royal Sydney Yacht Squadron member since 1964, an active yachtsman and yachting benefactor, as well as an adept fundraiser. He was the Sydney Heritage Fleet governor and Heart Research Institute board member. He was an Australia Day Regatta chairman and life member, it being the world's oldest continuously conducted sailing regatta. He was a Cruising Yacht Club of Australia member and a Royal Prince Alfred Yacht Club flag officer. He donated many perpetual trophies to sailing, including one for line honours in the Australia Day ocean race to Botany Bay and return.

His memorial service was held at Saint Mark's Church, Darling Point on 4 December 2007.
