= Ong Eng Hong =

Badminton player (1935–2018)

- 王荣沣
- Born: 1936; Kuala Lumpur, Malaysia
- Died: 2018
- Citizenship: Australian
- Occupation: Badminton Player
- Spouse: Goh Soh Meng (m. 1962)
- Children: 2
- Father: Ong Cho Tek

Ong Eng Hong
- Traditional Chinese: 王榮灃
- Simplified Chinese: 王荣沣
- Hokkien POJ: Ông Êng-hong
Transcriptions
Standard Mandarin
- Hanyu Pinyin: Wáng Róngfēng
Southern Min
- Hokkien POJ: Ông Êng-hong

Ong Eng Hong (Chinese: 王荣沣; pinyin: Wáng Róngfēng; Pe̍h-ōe-jī: Ông Êng-hong; 1935 – 2018) was an Australian badminton player. In 1955, he competed in the Australian National Badminton Championships and made his debut as the champion of the men's singles.

== Early life ==
Ong was born in 1936 in Kuala Lumpur, Malaysia. His ancestral home is in Jiangdou, a small village in Fuqing, Fujian, China. His father Ong Cho Tek (Chinese: 王祖德; pinyin: Wáng Zǔdé) was a businessman dealing in the early car and bicycle spare parts trade in Singapore and Malaysia. He has 18 siblings.

== Personal life ==
Ong and his wife, Goh Soh Meng, were married on the 22 December 1962 in St Kilda, Victoria. They have 2 children.

== Death ==
Ong died in 2018 at the age of 83.
