= Alf Howard =

Australian scientist (1906–2010)

- Alf Howard
- Born: 30 April 1906; Camberwell, Victoria, Australia
- Died: 4 July 2010 (aged 104)
- Occupations: Explorer, chemist, hydrologist, programmer
- Known for: BANZARE
- Scientific career
- Workplaces: University of Queensland Department of Human Involvement; University of Melbourne

Alf Howard AM (30 April 1906 – 4 July 2010) was an Australian scientist, educator and explorer. He was most prominently known for being the last remaining member of the expedition to Antarctica, which was led by Sir Douglas Mawson on board the RRS Discovery in 1929–1931. Howard served in the capacity of a chemist and the hydrologist aboard the vessel, which included being the individual who was responsible for monitoring the sea-water temperatures and the collection and chemical analysis of sea-water samples.

== Biography ==
Howard was born and raised in Camberwell, Victoria. He completed a Master of Science, his first of five degrees at the University of Melbourne in 1927; Howard also received an honorary doctorate in statistics and a PhD in linguistics from the University of Queensland. He worked with the Department of Human Movement as a programmer and a statics consultant and an honorary researcher working full-time without pay for over 20 years. He stopped in 2003 at age 97.

He was doing work on organic chemistry when he was approached by Sir David Orme Masson for the BANZARE. Within 48 hours Howard took the train to Perch and sailed to England on Orient Steam Navigation's Orvieto.

Howard was made a Member of the Order of Australia (AO) in the 1998 Australia Day Honours for "service to science through Antarctic exploration as a member of the British Australian New Zealand Antarctic Research Expedition (1929–1931), for his work on food technology and preservation, and for his contribution to statistical design".

Just before his 100th birthday, Howard, through pre-recorded film, opened the new Discovery's Ocean Odyssey wing at the Discovery Point museum in Dundee, which stands beside the old restored ship Discovery. He was profiled in the Tasmanian Museum and Art Gallery's new exhibition Islands to Ice: The Great Southern Ocean and Antarctica in late 2010.

In 2005, he donated 80,000 (AU$) for a computer laboratory for undergraduate students. Four years earlier in 2001 he was presented with the Australian Geographic Society award.

== Death ==
Howard was the only surviving member of Mawson's expedition when he died in 2010 aged 104 . Alf died of natural causes.
