= Miriam-Rose Ungunmerr-Baumann =

Australian Aboriginal activist, educator and artist

Miriam-Rose Ungunmerr-Baumann AM
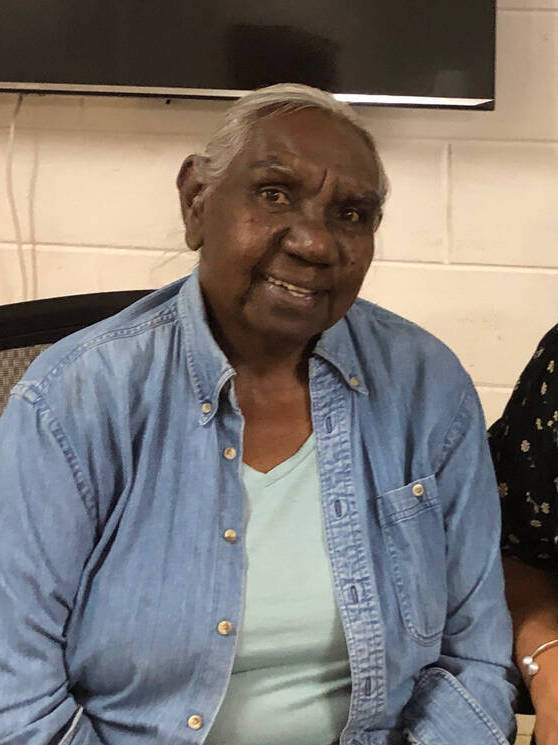
- Ungunmerr-Baumann in 2021
- Born: 1950 (age 75–76); Daly River, Northern Territory
- Occupations: Aboriginal activist, educator and artist

2021 Senior Australian of the Year
- Preceded by: John Newnham
- Succeeded by: Valmai Dempsey

Miriam-Rose Ungunmerr-Baumann AM (born 1950) is an Australian Aboriginal activist, educator and artist of the Ngan’gityemerri language group. Ungunmerr-Baumann is the first Indigenous teacher to work in the Northern Territory. and the owner of Rak Malfiyin Homeland. She is also the first Indigenous Australian woman to visit Antarctica. Ungunmerr-Baumann is a "devout Christian" and much of her artwork reflects religious themes. In 2021, she was named Senior Australian of the Year.

== Biography ==
Ungunmerr-Baumann was born in 1950 in Daly River. She was baptized as a Catholic when she was fifteen. As a teenager, she worked as a domestic servant to a teacher who eventually employed her as an assistant teacher. She attended Kormilda College to become a teacher. Ungunmerr-Baumann became the first Indigenous teacher in the Northern Territory in 1975. She used art in her classroom, encouraging children to express themselves. She attended Deakin University and in 1988, received a Bachelor of Arts. In 1993, she became the principal of St. Francis Xavier Catholic School.

Ungunmerr-Baumann became a Member of the Order of Australia in 1998 for her "role in promoting Aboriginal education and art." She was also awarded an honorary doctorate from the Northern Territory University in 2002.

== Work ==
Ungunmerr-Baumann's work uses both Indigenous techniques and "western acrylics." She has worked to encourage elders in Aboriginal communities to pass along artistic techniques to the younger generation.
