= James Wright (doctor) =

Australian medical practitioner (1927–2022)

James Wright AM
- Born: John Franklin Knight; 12 December 1927; Brisbane, Queensland, Australia
- Died: 27 November 2022 (aged 94)
- Education: University of Sydney
- Occupations: Medical doctor; media personality; author

John Franklin Knight AM (12 December 1927 – 27 November 2022), known professionally as Dr James Wright, was an Australian medical professional who was notable for his books, television and radio appearances, and regular newspaper and magazine columns. He was also sometimes nicknamed "the Merry Medic".

Wright was known for his ability to demystify complex medical issues for a nationwide audience. He took TV camera crews into hospital medical theatres and neonatal intensive care clinic. He taught the nation about emerging diseases such as HIV/AIDS and Hepatitis C, whilst destigmatising prejudices and hysteria surrounding these diseases.

== Early life ==
Wright was born on 12 December 1927 in Brisbane, Queensland. When he was six months old his family moved to Sydney. He was raised on Fox Valley Road in Wahroonga, a northern Sydney suburb. His father was a Seventh-day Adventist minister. He had a "very strict, disciplinarian upbringing. (He) used to get a hiding pretty regularly". As with most Seventh-Day Adventism members, his family were strict vegetarians. His mother lived to 100 and his father to 90. He was educated at North Sydney Boys High School. After graduating, he originally wanted to pursue a career in journalism, before deciding to become a doctor and studying medicine at the University of Sydney.

== Personal life ==
Wright was a committed Seventh-day Adventist. He was a vegetarian, did not smoke or drink alcohol and exercised daily. In 1955 he married Noreen Westlake.

Wright made a fortune in the millions of dollars through property investments, mainly on the Queensland Gold Coast. In the early 2000s Wright was swindled out of A$57 million by a friend, New Zealander Derek Turner. "Turner had been his neighbour for 10 to 15 years and was a trusted acquaintance", Wright said. He also owned a motel and a funeral director's company for forty years, also a printing company.

Wright had surgery for throat cancer and in February 2017 surgery for bowel cancer.

== Medical career ==
Wright studied medicine at the University of Sydney and first practised as a general practitioner (GP) in Tottenham, a small town in the Central West very close to the geographic centre of New South Wales. As the only GP within a radius of 160 km, he took on several duties including as obstetrician, surgeon, counsellor, dispensing pharmacist and vet.

== Media career ==
=== Television and radio media ===
Wright, whilst running his private practice, started his media career, as the local correspondent for the Australian Broadcasting Corporation, where his stories were sent to the ABC by Morse code.

On television he appeared on The Mike Walsh Show and continued when that series was replaced by The Midday Show, where he became resident doctor during the tenure of both Ray Martin and Kerri-Anne Kennerley, spanning a period of 25 years, starting from the black and white era through to the transmission of colour.

Wright appeared on radio at 2GB and 2UE where he had his own radio show for almost 18 years which was beamed across Australia via the Macquarie Radio Network.

=== Printed media ===
Wright had newspaper columns including in the Herald Sun (Melbourne), the Sunday Telegraph (Sydney), the Sunday Mail (Adelaide and Perth), the Brisbane Sunday Mail, the Sunday Territorian and the Sunday Tasmanian.

Wright also had regular column in magazines including Woman's Weekly, Women's Day, Dolly and Cleo.

== Medi Aid Centre Foundation ==
In 1971, Wright and his wife Noreen established the charity Medi-Aid. It grew from an idea in Wright's teenage years to a national foundation that provides aged care accommodation for more than 700 elderly people. The foundation has several villages in Sydney, and one on the Gold Coast in Queensland. Its prime aim is to provide housing for the older community across all socio-economic levels.

== Death ==
Wright died on 27 November 2022, at the age of 94.

== Awards ==
In 1998, Wright was appointed a Member of the Order of Australia (AM) for his media outreach and the work of his foundation. In 2003, he was one of the three finalists in the "Australian of the Year" awards. Wright was awarded as the 2017 New South Wales Senior Australian of the Year.

== Bibliography ==
- Dr Wright's family medical guide. James Wright Sydney: Golden Press, 1985. 566 p ISBN 0855581972
- Family medical care : a five-volume illustrated series covering all aspects of health care. James Wright, Signs, 2007. ISBN 9781876010966 (set)
  - "Parenting". ISBN 9781876010911 (v. 1)
  - "Parenting". ISBN 9781876010928 (v. 2)
  - "Major systems of the body and emergencies". ISBN 9781876010935 (v. 3)
  - "Marvels of the human frame".ISBN 9781876010942 (v. 4)
  - "Special organs and the skeletal structure". ISBN 9781876010959 (v. 5)
- Understanding tummy troubles : the recognition and treatment of peptic ulcers, and other common disorders of the stomach and intestinal system. James Wright, Golden Press, 1984. 72 p. : ill ISBN 0730200132
- Everything a teenage boy should know. John F. Knight, Signs Publishing Co., First published 1973, revised 1980 and 1983. : ill. ISBN 0959996494, ISBN 0949809519
- Everything a teenage girl should know. John F. Knight, Signs Publishing Co., First published 1973, revised 1980 and 1982. : ill. ISBN 0959996486, ISBN 0949809527
- So you're a teenager : vital facts for girls. James Wright, Signs Publishing Co., 2003, 192 p. : ill. ISBN 1876010665
- So you're a teenager : vital facts for boys. James Wright, Signs Publishing Co., 2001, 192 p. : col. ill. ISBN 1876010266, ISBN 1876010363
- Dr. Wright's fabulous fitness book. James Wright, Horwitz Grahame, c1987. 173 p. ISBN 0725520116
- Alternative medicine James Wright, Golden Press, 1982. 280 p. : ill. ISBN 0855583789
- Women's problems. James Wright, Golden Press, 1981. 175 p. : ill. ISBN 0855587776
- Baby & childhood illnesses. James Wright, Golden Press, 1981. 278 p. : ill. ISBN 0855587938
- A medical guide to good health.James Wright, Medi-Aid Centre Foundation, 1978. 303 p. ISBN 0959528008
- Successful slimming, incorporating "The great Australian diet' Golden Press, 1981. 215 p. ISBN 0855587857
