= Janice Reid =

Australian academic and medical anthropologist

Janice Reid AC FASSA FRSN
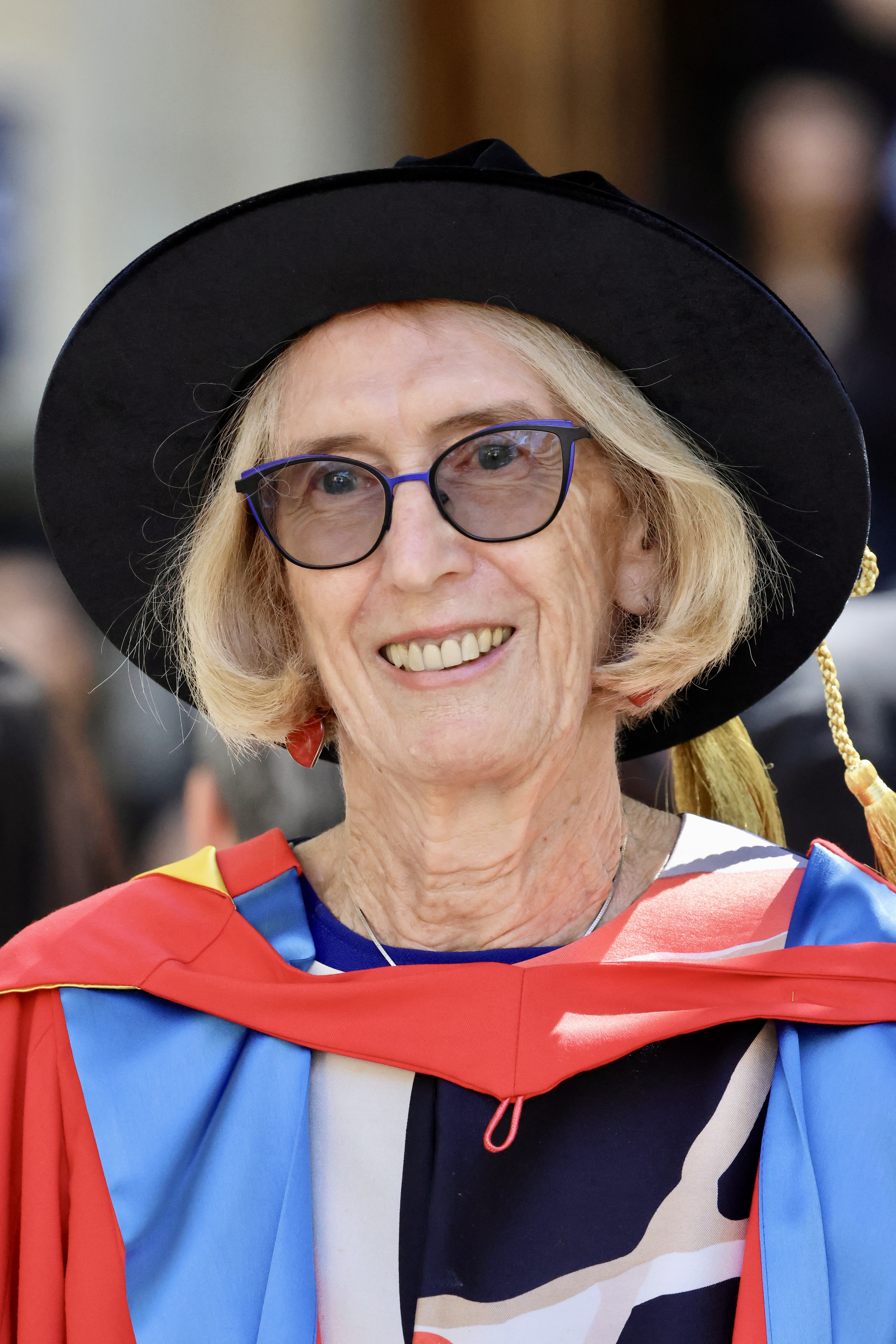
- Reid in 2026
- Born: 19 September 1947 (age 79); Adelaide, South Australia
- Title: Emeritus Professor

Academic background
- Education: Presbyterian Girls' College, Adelaide
- Alma mater: University of Adelaide (BSc); Stanford University (MA, PhD)
- Website: Janice Reid & Associates

Janice Clare Reid (born 19 September 1947) is an Australian academic and medical anthropologist, who has specialised in Aboriginal and refugee health. She was Vice-Chancellor of the University of Western Sydney from 1998 to 2013.

== Early life and education ==
Janice Clare Reid was born in Adelaide, South Australia on 19 September 1947.

She was educated at the Presbyterian Girls' College (now Seymour College) and then completed a BSc at the University of Adelaide. She later completed an MA at the University of Hawaiʻi and an MA and PhD at Stanford University, in the United States.

== Career ==
Reid began her career as summer research assistant (1966–1968) at the Australian Mineral Development Laboratories in Adelaide, later in soil science and animal biology at the Waite Institute and tutor (1968) in the Department of Geology at her alma mater, the University of Adelaide. In 1968–1969 she worked as a high school teacher in Papua New Guinea. After completing her MA at the University of Hawaii she spent 1971 to mid-1974 at Stanford University as a teaching assistant and graduate research assistant, while gaining her MA and PhD. Returning to Australian in 1974 Reid was attached as a research officer to the Department of Community Medicine at the University of New South Wales and later as program coordinator at the same university. Her field research as a medical anthropologist during 1974–75 and beyond was at Yirrkala in northeast Arnhem Land studying the Yolngu concepts of illness and healing. Reid's research and advocacy thereafter focused primarily on Aboriginal and refugee communities focusing on their health, health care and mental health.

In 1978 she moved to the University of Sydney's Cumberland College of Health Sciences, as lecturer in the Department of Behavioural and General Studies. A year later she was offered the position of senior lecturer at the University of Sydney in the School of Public Health and Tropical Medicine. In 1987 Reid was appointed Head of the School of Community Health, at the Cumberland College of Health Sciences. The college shortly thereafter merged with the university, During that time she established the Centre for Crosscultural Studies in Health and Medicine with the support of a federal government grant.

In 1992 she took up the position at the Queensland University of Technology of Pro Vice-Chancellor (Academic) (1992–1997).

In 1998 she was appointed Vice Chancellor and President of the University of Western Sydney. On her retirement in December 2013 after 16 years in the role, Reid was made an emeritus Professor in recognition of her distinguished service to the university, by then with 40,000 students and more than 3000 staff. She was also awarded an Honorary Doctorate of the university with a building and community art prize named in her honour.

=== Education ===
In the field of education she served on the Federal Higher Education Council, the Australian Vice-Chancellors’ Committee (now Universities Australia), the Executive of the Academy of the Social Sciences in Australia (ASSA), of which she is an elected Fellow (FASSA), the Council of the Association of Commonwealth Universities, the Federal Council for Australia-Latin America Relations (COALAR) as Chair of its Education Committee, the 2002 Federal Higher Education Review Reference Group. From 2005 to 2008 she was the Australian representative and Vice Chair of the governing board of the Paris-based OECD's program on institutional management in higher education (IMHE) and in 2012 Chair of the NSW Vice-Chancellor's Committee. From 2011 she was vice-chair of the international Talloires Network of universities committed to social responsibility, and was Australia's representative on the Council of the University of the South Pacific, a twelve nation university. She previously served on the boards of the Blue Mountains Grammar School (New South Wales) and Anglican Church Grammar School (Queensland). In 2015–16 Reid was a member of the Review Committee, which was appointed to provide expert advice on revisions to the Australian Code for the Responsible Conduct of Research, a document co-written by NHMRC, the Australian Research Council (ARC) and Universities Australia (UA), and to produce draft Guides on investigating and managing potential breaches of the Code. She was subsequently appointed to the Australian Research Integrity Committee.

=== Health and research ===
In the health and research sectors she has served on committees of the National Health and Medical Research Council (NHMRC), the Trust and Council of the Queensland Institute of Medical Research, and as Chair of the Australian Institute of Health and Welfare from 1995 to 2001. In 1978–79 she was a Specialist Advisor to the House of Representative's Standing Committee on Aboriginal Health during its enquiry.In 1986–87 she and Dr Tim Strong undertook at the request of the western Sydney area health service a study of the health care needs of refugee victims of torture and trauma, leading to the funding and establishment by the state government of the Service for the Rehabilitation of Torture and Trauma Survivors (STARTTS). She chaired the national review of nursing education in Australia in 1994. She has been a member of the boards of the NSW Clinical Excellence Commission and Agency for Clinical Innovation, public agencies charged with promoting safety and quality in health care, and chaired the research committees of both. In 2013 she was appointed to the state advisory council of St Vincent's and the Mater Hospitals (NSW), subsequently membership of the Clinical Governance and Patient Experience Committee, and from 2015 Chair of the Pacific Friends of the Global Fund formed to address the malaria, TB and HIV/AIDS epidemics in the developing world. She is currently deputy chair of a Doherty Institute-based NGO funded by international multilateral health focused organisations. She also served as a consultant to the World Health Organisation on the guidelines for the Western Pacific and East Asia on the United Nations Sustainable Development Goals. In 2012 she presented the Sir Robert Menzies Oration on Higher Education at the University of Melbourne on the historical and political context of university funding, public policy and social justice.

=== Industry and the arts ===
Her previous appointments in industry and the arts include the Board of the National Library of Australia, the National Cultural Heritage Committee, the Board of UniSuper Ltd (superannuation fund), Integral Energy (a power utility), the Board of the Queensland Museum, Greater Western Sydney Economic Development Board, NSW Productivity and Innovation Council, the Board of Trustees of the Art Gallery of New South Wales, also chairing its Acquisitions and Loans Committee, and the Salvation Army Greater Western Sydney Advisory Board. She initiated a sculpture competition at the university to encourage emerging and established sculptors and to bring major artworks onto the six campuses. In 2016 Reid was nominated for the 100 Women of Influence co-supported by the Australian Financial Review and Westpac winning the management and boards category,

== Awards and recognition ==
- Awarded the 1984 Wellcome Medal for Research in Anthropology as Applied to Medical Problems by the Royal Anthropological Institute of Great Britain and Ireland
- Appointed Fellow of the Academy of the Social Sciences in Australia, 1991
- Appointed Member of the Order of Australia (AM) in the 1998 Australia Day Honours "for service to crosscultural public health research and the development of health services of socio-economically disadvantaged groups in the community".
- Granted Centenary Medal, 1 January 2001 "for service to Australian society through health and university administration".
- Awarded Doctor of Letters, honoris causa, 2013 by the University of Western Sydney
- Appointed Fellow of the Royal Society of NSW, 2014
- Appointed Companion of the Order of Australia (AC) in the 2015 Australia Day Honours "for eminent service to the tertiary education sector through executive roles, as an advocate for equitable access to educational opportunities, particularly for Indigenous, refugee and lower socio-economic communities, and to health, medical and health care research and cultural bodies."

== Bibliography ==
=== Books as author ===
- Sorcerers and Healing Spirits: Continuity and Change in an Aboriginal Medical System, Australia National University Press, Canberra, 1983, ISBN 0708117686

=== Books as editor ===
- Body, Land and Spirit: Health and Healing in Aboriginal Society, University of Queensland, St Lucia, 1982, ISBN 0702216593
- The Health of Immigrant Australia, co-edited with Peggy Trompf, Harcourt Brace Jovanovich, Sydney, 1990, ISBN 0729503844
- The Health of Aboriginal Australia, co-edited with Peggy Trompf, Harcourt Brace Jovanovich, Sydney 1991, ISBN 0729503852
- Bloom, A & Reid, JC (1984) Anthropology and Primary Health Care in Developing Countries, Special Issue of Social Science and Medicine (United Kingdom), Canada, Volume 19, Number 3, 1984
