= Eric Singleton Bird Sanctuary =

Wetland sanctuary in Western Australia

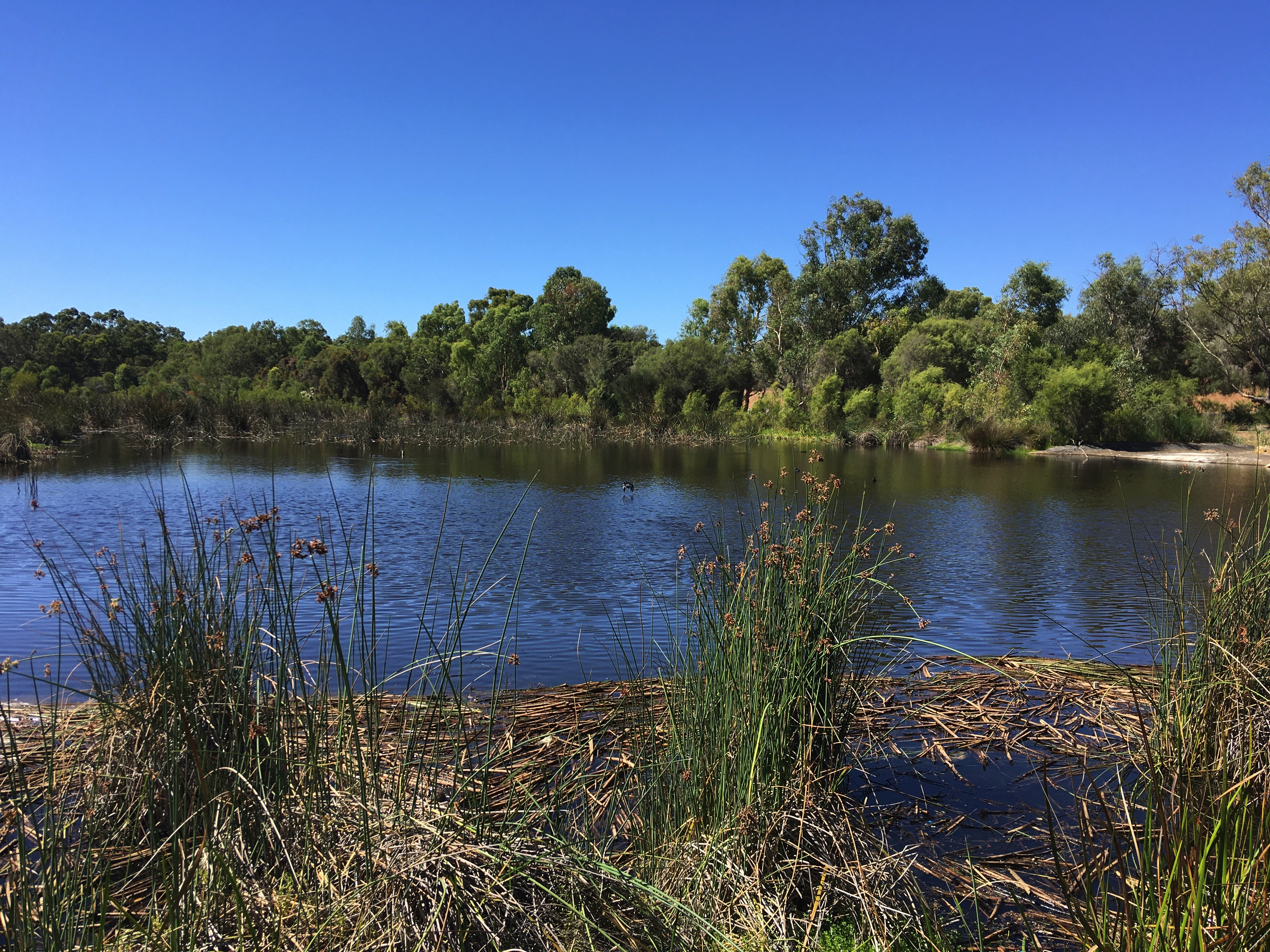
- Lake at Eric Singleton Bird Sanctuary
- Interactive map of Eric Singleton Bird Sanctuary
- Location: Bayswater, Western Australia
- Coordinates: 31.927°S 115.923°E

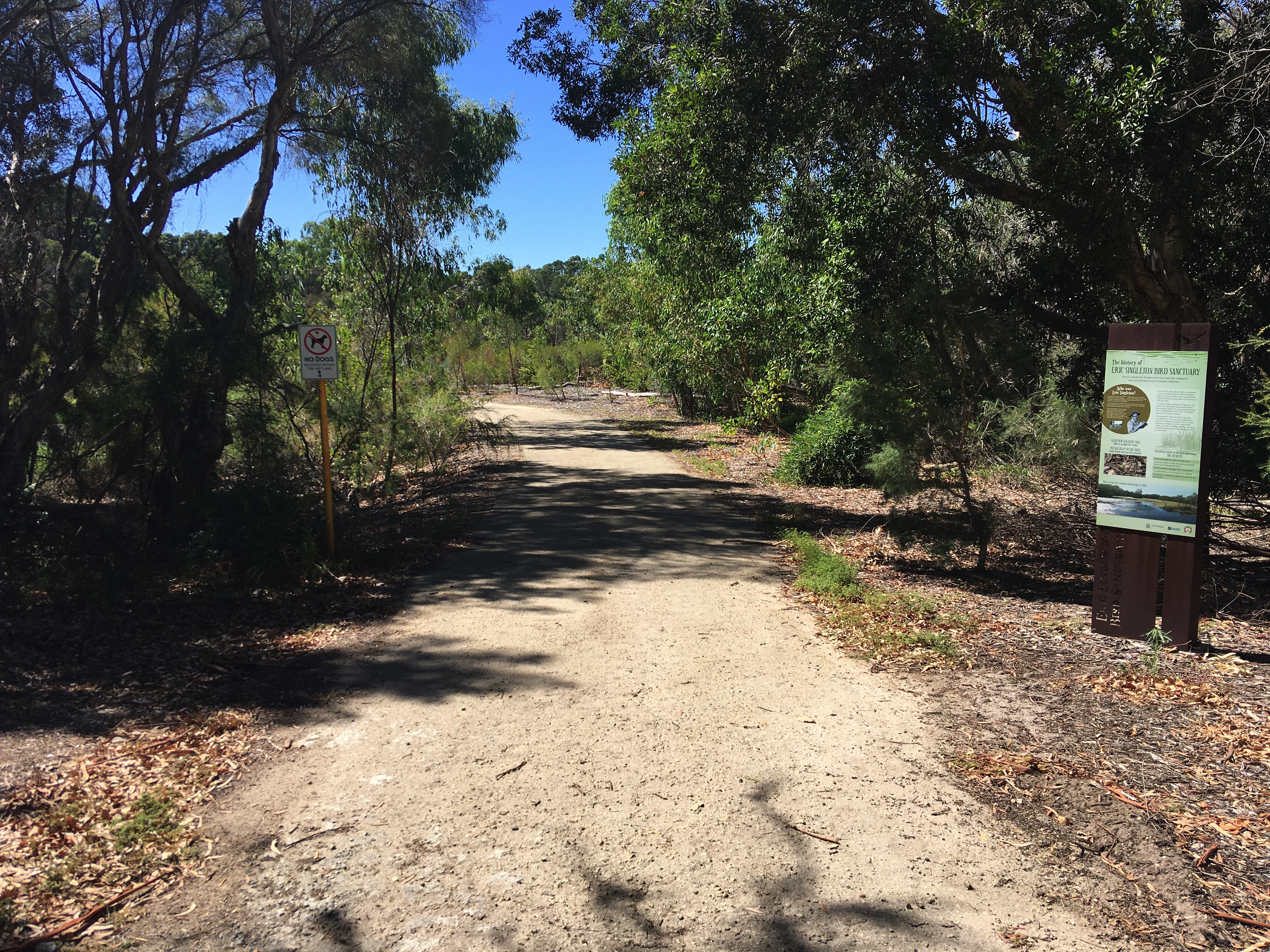
Entrance to Eric Singleton Bird Sanctuary

The Eric Singleton Bird Sanctuary is an artificial wetland in Bayswater, Western Australia, a suburb of Perth. The Bayswater Brook discharges into the wetlands, which in turn discharges into the Swan River. In 2015, it underwent a rehabilitation project in order to improve the water quality and attract more wildlife.

== History ==
Prior to the 1950s, the site of the Eric Singleton Bird Sanctuary was a seasonally wet depression. In the 1950s, it was drained. Between 1972 and 1981, the surrounding area was used for a landfill, and the site became a wetland.

Due to nutrients and pollutants from runoff, the wetlands were severely degraded and experiencing frequent algal blooms. In 2015, the wetlands underwent a $3 million rehabilitation project, jointly funded by the City of Bayswater and the Department of Biodiversity, Conservation and Attractions. The project was designed so that water coming from the Bayswater Brook is cleaned and stripped of nutrients by the wetlands before being discharged into the Swan River. First, the incoming water flows through a gross pollutant trap, removing any rubbish, sediment or other large materials. The water then passes through alternating areas of shallow and deep water, which removes nitrogen and other nutrients, before flowing out of the wetland. The flow of water is controlled by a series of weirs and outlets, and in total, the process takes 48 hours from when the water enters the wetland to when the water exits. The project is projected to stop 1.35 tonnes (3,000 lb) of nitrogen, 200 kilograms (440 lb) of phosphorus and 40 tonnes (88,000 lb) of sediment and rubbish from entering the Swan River each year. The project also included the creation of a publicly accessible area in the middle of the wetland. Prior to the rehabilitation project, the wetlands were artificially supplied with ground water to ensure that the wetland did not dry up. After the completion of the project, it received several awards, including from the Australian Engineering Excellence Awards, the WA Premier's Awards and the Australian Institute of Landscape Architects.

In 2016, a housing development was approved by the Western Australian Planning Commission next to the wetlands, overruling the City of Bayswater and triggering significant controversy. The proposed development consisted of two large blocks, and one block was considered by the community to be environmentally sensitive and contain wetlands. In 2017, the State government provided $1.5 million to the City of Bayswater to part-fund the purchase of the block which contained the wetlands, thereby ending a significant amount of the controversy.

In 2018, the Eric Singleton Bird Sanctuary was rezoned from Urban to Parks and Recreation, ensuring that it would not be developed.

== Name ==
The wetlands were named after Eric Singleton, who was a local advocate for the wetlands. He was a bird enthusiast and helped save the wetlands from development in the 1970s.

== Flora and Fauna ==
104 bird species have been recorded at the Eric Singleton Bird Sanctuary. They include:

- Biziura lobata (Musk Duck)
- Malacorhynchus membranaceus (Pink-eared duck)
- Oxyura australis (Blue-billed duck)
- Anas gracilis (Grey teal)
- Poliocephalus poliocephalus (Hoary-headed grebe)
- Elseyornis melanops (Black-fronted Dotterel)

170,000 native plants of 26 different species were planted in the Eric Singleton Bird Sanctuary during the rehabilitation project. They include:

- Schoenoplectus validus (River club rush)
- Baumea articulata (Jointed twig rush)
- Baumea juncea (Bare Twig Rush)
