= Paul Parkinson (Scouting) =

Australian scout

Paul Parkinson OAM

Regional Chair of the Asia-Pacific Regional Scout Committee

Paul Parkinson OAM of Brisbane, Australia served as the Regional Chair of the Asia-Pacific Regional Scout Committee of the World Organization of the Scout Movement (WOSM), Scouts Australia National Commissioner for Adult Training and Development. He is, as well, Principal of the Scouts Australia Institute of Training (SAIT).

Parkinson started Scouting as a Cub, gaining his Queen's Scout Award in 1968, and the Baden-Powell Award in 1976. He became Deputy Chief Commissioner, Queensland Branch. He was awarded the Silver Kangaroo by Scouts Australia in 2004, and in 2009 (from the Scout Association of Malaysia) the Pingat Perkhidmatan Cemerlang.

Parkinson earned a Master of Environmental Education degree, and is completing Doctoral studies associated with self-regulatory learning practices in adults. He is a Lecturer (academia) in Science Education at the Mount Gravatt Campus of Griffith University, in Brisbane. He has had national involvement in the development of science curriculum, and of science education.
