= Stuart Rowlands =

Personal information
- Born: Stuart Michael Rowlands; 26 August 1991 (age 34) Yeovil, United Kingdom
- Height: 1.83 m (6 ft 0 in)
- Weight: 69 kg (152 lb; 10.9 st)

Sport
- Country: England Australia
- Sport: Badminton
- Handedness: Right

Stuart Rowlands is a retired English/Australian badminton player, born on 26 August 1991 in Yeovil, Somerset, United Kingdom.

He was a part of the English National Junior Team from 2004 to 2010 before migrating to Australia in 2011.

Rowlands represented England in multiple international events across Europe whilst in the UK. He trained at the Badminton England's High Performance Centre at the University of Bath under Badminton England coach Pete Bush.

In 2015 Rowlands became the Australian National Champion in Mixed Doubles. In 2016, he was the number 1 ranked male player in singles, doubles and mixed doubles on the Australian National Badminton Rankings. Rowlands was granted a Distinguished Talent Visa (now called Global Talent Visa) to permanently reside in Australia in September 2016 due his high level reputation within the sport and benefit to the Australian badminton community. He was later granted Australian citizenship in August 2018.

After working in a casual coaching capacity for Badminton Australia in 2017 and 2018, Rowlands was appointed as Badminton Australia's National Junior Coach and Performance Manager in 2019. During his time with Badminton Australia he coached at two World Junior Championships (Canada 2018 and Russia 2019) and the Youth Olympic Games (Buenos Aires 2018).

In 2020, Rowlands established his own coaching brand and academy 'SR Badminton' based in Adelaide, South Australia. He also works part-time at St Peter's College, a prestigious all boys school in the heart of Adelaide, as their Director of Badminton.
