= 1995–96 FIS Freestyle Ski World Cup =

Freestyle skiing championships

Freestyle Skiing World Cup 1995/96
Discipline	Men	Women
Overall	(United States) Jonny Moseley	(Canada) Katherina Kubenk
Moguls	(Canada) Jean-Luc Brassard	(United States) Donna Weinbrecht (5)
Dual moguls	(Sweden) Jesper Rönnback	(France) Candice Gilg
Aerials	(France) Sébastien Foucras	(Switzerland) Colette Brand
Ballet	(Switzerland) Heini Baumgartner	(Russia) Elena Batalova
Combined	(United States) Jonny Moseley	—

Competition
Locations	14	14
Individual	42	35

The 1995/96 FIS Freestyle Skiing World Cup was the seventeenth World Cup season in freestyle skiing organised by International Ski Federation. The season started on 6 December 1995 and ended on 23 March 1996. This season included five disciplines: aerials, moguls, dual moguls, ballet and combined.

This season combined events were on world cup calendar only for men and none for ladies. In this season dual moguls were introduced for the first time in world cup calendar. Dual moguls counted as season title and was awarded with small crystal globe separately from moguls.

== Men ==
=== Moguls ===
Num	Season	Date	Place	Event	Winner	Second	Third
1	1	11 December 1995	(France) Tignes	DM	(France) Fabien Bertrand	(Canada) Stéphane Rochon	(Sweden) Anders Jonell
2	2	15 February 1996	(France) La Clusaz	DM	(United States) Craig Rodman	(United States) Alex Wilson	(France) Fabrice Ougier
3	3	7 March 1996	(Sweden) Hundfjället	DM	(Sweden) Jesper Rönnback	(Canada) Stéphane Rochon	(Sweden) Kurre Lansburgh
150	1	10 December 1995	(France) Tignes	MO	(Canada) Jean-Luc Brassard	(France) Olivier Cotte	(France) Fabrice Ougier
151	2	16 December 1995	(France) La Plagne	MO	(United States) Troy Benson	(United States) Jim Moran	(France) Fabrice Ougier
152	3	5 January 1996	(United States) Lake Placid	MO	(United States) Jonny Moseley	(United States) Jim Moran	(United States) Troy Benson
153	4	13 January 1996	(Canada) Blackcomb	MO	(United States) Jonny Moseley	(United States) Jim Moran	(Canada) Stéphane Rochon
154	5	19 January 1996	(United States) Breckenridge	MO	(Canada) Stéphane Rochon	(United States) Jonny Moseley	(France) Laurent Niol
155	6	27 January 1996	(Canada) Mont Tremblant	MO	(Canada) Stéphane Rochon	(France) Fabrice Ougier	(United States) Jonny Moseley
156	7	4 February 1996	(Austria) Kirchberg	MO	(Canada) Jean-Luc Brassard	(United States) Jonny Moseley	(France) Johann Gregoire
157	8	14 February 1996	(France) La Clusaz	MO	(Canada) Jean-Luc Brassard	(United States) Troy Benson	(France) Laurent Niol
158	9	6 March 1996	(Sweden) Hundfjället	MO	(Canada) Stéphane Rochon	(Sweden) Jesper Rönnback	(Canada) Jean-Luc Brassard
159	10	15 March 1996	(Austria) Altenmarkt-Zauchensee	MO	(United States) Jim Moran	(Canada) Jean-Luc Brassard	(Canada) John Smart
160	11	23 March 1996	(Switzerland) Meiringen-Hasliberg	MO	(Japan) Takehiro Sakamoto	(Canada) Jean-Luc Brassard	(France) Richard Gay

=== Aerials ===
Num	Season	Date	Place	Event	Winner	Second	Third
147	1	9 December 1995	(France) Tignes	AE	(United States) Eric Bergoust	(Canada) David Belhumeur	(Australia) Jonathan Sweet
148	2	15 December 1995	(France) La Plagne	AE	(France) Alexis Blanc	(France) Sébastien Foucras	(United States) Kris Feddersen
149	3	20 December 1995	(Italy) Piancavallo	AE	(France) Alexis Blanc	(United States) Kris Feddersen	(Canada) Lloyd Langlois
150	4	5 January 1996	(United States) Lake Placid	AE	(Austria) Christian Rijavec	(Canada) Lloyd Langlois	(Belarus) Vasilli Vorobiov
151	5	20 January 1996	(United States) Breckenridge	AE	(Belarus) Vasilli Vorobiov	(Austria) Christian Rijavec	(Canada) Nicolas Fontaine
152	6	25 January 1996	(Canada) Mont Tremblant	AE	(France) Sébastien Foucras	(Austria) Christian Rijavec	(Canada) Nicolas Fontaine
153	7	28 January 1996	(Canada) Mont Tremblant	AE	(Austria) Christian Rijavec	(France) Alexis Blanc	(United States) Britt Swartley
154	8	3 February 1996	(Austria) Kirchberg	AE	(United States) Eric Bergoust	(Austria) Christian Rijavec	(Canada) Lloyd Langlois
155	9	10 February 1996	(Germany) Oberjoch	AE	(France) Alexis Blanc	(France) Sébastien Foucras	(Canada) Nicolas Fontaine
156	10	16 February 1996	(France) La Plagne	AE	(France) Sébastien Foucras	(United States) Eric Bergoust	(Canada) Nicolas Fontaine
157	11	9 March 1996	(Sweden) Hundfjället	AE	(France) Alexis Blanc	(France) Sébastien Foucras	(United States) Kip Griffin
158	12	16 March 1996	(Austria) Altenmarkt-Zauchensee	AE	(United States) Eric Bergoust	(United States) Matt Chojnacki	(United States) Mariano Ferrario

=== Ballet ===
Num	Season	Date	Place	Event	Winner	Second	Third
149	1	6 December 1995	(France) Tignes	AC	(Switzerland) Heini Baumgartner	(United States) Ian Edmondson	(United States) Jason Bodnar
150	2	14 December 1995	(France) La Plagne	AC	(Switzerland) Heini Baumgartner	(United States) Ian Edmondson	(Finland) Antti Inberg
151	3	12 January 1996	(Canada) Blackcomb	AC	(Switzerland) Heini Baumgartner	(United States) Ian Edmondson	(Norway) Rune Kristiansen
152	4	18 January 1996	(United States) Breckenridge	AC	(Norway) Rune Kristiansen	(Switzerland) Heini Baumgartner	(Finland) Antti Inberg
153	5	26 January 1996	(Canada) Mont Tremblant	AC	(Norway) Rune Kristiansen	(Switzerland) Heini Baumgartner	(United States) Ian Edmondson
154	6	1 February 1996	(Austria) Kirchberg	AC	(Norway) Rune Kristiansen	(Switzerland) Heini Baumgartner	(United States) Ian Edmondson
155	7	10 February 1996	(Germany) Oberjoch	AC	(Norway) Rune Kristiansen	(Switzerland) Heini Baumgartner	(United States) Steven Roxberg
156	8	8 March 1996	(Sweden) Hundfjället	AC	(Switzerland) Heini Baumgartner	(Norway) Rune Kristiansen	(United States) Ian Edmondson
157	9	16 March 1996	(Austria) Altenmarkt-Zauchensee	AC	(Switzerland) Heini Baumgartner	(Norway) Rune Kristiansen	(United States) Ian Edmondson
158	10	22 March 1996	(Switzerland) Meiringen-Hasliberg	AC	(Switzerland) Heini Baumgartner	(Finland) Antti Inberg	(Switzerland) Konrad Hilpert

=== Combined ===
Num	Season	Date	Place	Event	Winner	Second	Third
137	1	20 January 1996	(United States) Breckenridge	CO	(United States) Jonny Moseley	(Canada) David Belhumeur	information is not available
138	2	25 January 1996	(Canada) Mont Tremblant	CO	(United States) Jonny Moseley	(Canada) David Belhumeur	information is not available
139	3	28 January 1996	(Canada) Mont Tremblant	CO	(United States) Jonny Moseley	(Canada) David Belhumeur	information is not available
140	4	4 February 1996	(Austria) Kirchberg	CO	(United States) Jonny Moseley	(Canada) David Belhumeur	information is not available
141	5	9 March 1996	(Sweden) Hundfjället	CO	(United States) Jonny Moseley	(Canada) David Belhumeur	information is not available
142	6	16 March 1996	(Austria) Altenmarkt-Zauchensee	CO	(Canada) David Belhumeur	(Belarus) Oleg Kouleshov	information is not available

== Ladies ==
=== Moguls ===
Num	Season	Date	Place	Event	Winner	Second	Third
1	1	11 December 1995	(France) Tignes	DM	(Russia) Ljudmila Dymchenko	(Germany) Tatjana Mittermayer	(France) Candice Gilg
2	2	15 February 1996	(France) La Clusaz	DM	(France) Candice Gilg	(United States) Donna Weinbrecht	(Finland) Minna Karhu
3	3	7 March 1996	(Sweden) Hundfjället	DM	(United States) Donna Weinbrecht	(France) Candice Gilg	(Japan) Tae Satoya
150	1	10 December 1995	(France) Tignes	MO	(Germany) Tatjana Mittermayer	(France) Candice Gilg	(United States) Donna Weinbrecht
151	2	16 December 1995	(France) La Plagne	MO	(France) Candice Gilg	(Germany) Tatjana Mittermayer	(France) Anne Cattelin
152	3	5 January 1996	(United States) Lake Placid	MO	(United States) Donna Weinbrecht	(Germany) Tatjana Mittermayer	(France) Candice Gilg
153	4	13 January 1996	(Canada) Blackcomb	MO	(United States) Donna Weinbrecht	(France) Candice Gilg	(Germany) Tatjana Mittermayer
154	5	19 January 1996	(United States) Breckenridge	MO	(United States) Donna Weinbrecht	(France) Candice Gilg	(Norway) Kari Traa
155	6	27 January 1996	(Canada) Mont Tremblant	MO	(Finland) Minna Karhu	(Germany) Tatjana Mittermayer	(France) Candice Gilg
156	7	4 February 1996	(Austria) Kirchberg	MO	(United States) Donna Weinbrecht	(Germany) Tatjana Mittermayer	(France) Candice Gilg
157	8	14 February 1996	(France) La Clusaz	MO	(United States) Donna Weinbrecht	(Germany) Tatjana Mittermayer	(Finland) Minna Karhu
158	9	6 March 1996	(Sweden) Hundfjället	MO	(United States) Donna Weinbrecht	(France) Candice Gilg	(Finland) Minna Karhu
159	10	15 March 1996	(Austria) Altenmarkt-Zauchensee	MO	(United States) Donna Weinbrecht	(Germany) Tatjana Mittermayer	(France) Candice Gilg
160	11	23 March 1996	(Switzerland) Meiringen-Hasliberg	MO	(France) Candice Gilg	(Germany) Tatjana Mittermayer	(Japan) Aiko Uemura

=== Aerials ===
Num	Season	Date	Place	Event	Winner	Second	Third
150	1	9 December 1995	(France) Tignes	AE	(Canada) Veronica Brenner	(United States) Nikki Stone	(Switzerland) Colette Brand
151	2	15 December 1995	(France) La Plagne	AE	(Switzerland) Colette Brand	(Australia) Kirstie Marshall	(Russia) Natalia Orekhova
152	3	20 December 1995	(Italy) Piancavallo	AE	(Canada) Veronica Brenner	(United States) Nikki Stone	(Canada) Caroline Olivier
153	4	5 January 1996	(United States) Lake Placid	AE	(Canada) Veronica Brenner	(United States) Stacey Blumer	(Switzerland) Colette Brand
154	5	14 January 1996	(Canada) Blackcomb	AE	(Switzerland) Michèle Rohrbach	(United States) Stacey Blumer	(United States) Nikki Stone
155	6	20 January 1996	(United States) Breckenridge	AE	(United States) Nikki Stone	(Canada) Veronica Brenner	(Switzerland) Colette Brand
156	7	3 February 1996	(Austria) Kirchberg	AE	(Switzerland) Colette Brand	(United States) Nikki Stone	(Australia) Kirstie Marshall
157	8	10 February 1996	(Germany) Oberjoch	AE	(Switzerland) Colette Brand	(United States) Stacey Blumer	(Sweden) Marie Lindgren
158	9	16 February 1996	(France) La Plagne	AE	(Switzerland) Colette Brand	(Canada) Veronica Brenner	(Sweden) Marie Lindgren
159	10	9 March 1996	(Sweden) Hundfjället	AE	(Australia) Kirstie Marshall	(Canada) Caroline Olivier	(Switzerland) Michèle Rohrbach
160	11	16 March 1996	(Austria) Altenmarkt-Zauchensee	AE	(Switzerland) Colette Brand	(United States) Stacey Blumer	(Canada) Veronica Brenner

=== Ballet ===
Num	Season	Date	Place	Event	Winner	Second	Third
150	1	6 December 1995	(France) Tignes	AC	(Russia) Elena Batalova	(France) Cathy Fechoz	(Sweden) Annika Johansson
151	2	14 December 1995	(France) La Plagne	AC	(Russia) Elena Batalova	(France) Cathy Fechoz	(Russia) Natalia Razumovskaya
152	3	12 January 1996	(Canada) Blackcomb	AC	(Sweden) Annika Johansson	(Canada) Katherina Kubenk	(Russia) Oksana Kushenko
153	4	18 January 1996	(United States) Breckenridge	AC	(Russia) Natalia Razumovskaya	(Russia) Oksana Kushenko	(Spain) Raquel Gutiérrez
154	5	26 January 1996	(Canada) Mont Tremblant	AC	(Russia) Elena Batalova	(Russia) Natalia Razumovskaya	(Sweden) Annika Johansson
155	6	1 February 1996	(Austria) Kirchberg	AC	(Sweden) Annika Johansson	(Russia) Oksana Kushenko	(Sweden) Åsa Magnusson
156	7	10 February 1996	(Germany) Oberjoch	AC	(Russia) Elena Batalova	(Russia) Natalia Razumovskaya	(Sweden) Annika Johansson
157	8	8 March 1996	(Sweden) Hundfjället	AC	(Russia) Elena Batalova	(Russia) Natalia Razumovskaya	(Sweden) Annika Johansson
158	9	16 March 1996	(Austria) Altenmarkt-Zauchensee	AC	(Sweden) Annika Johansson	(Russia) Oksana Kushenko	(Russia) Elena Batalova
159	10	22 March 1996	(Switzerland) Meiringen-Hasliberg	AC	(Russia) Elena Batalova	(Sweden) Annika Johansson	(Russia) Oksana Kushenko

== Men's standings ==
=== Overall ===
Rank		Points
1	(United States) Jonny Moseley	203
2	(Canada) David Belhumeur	144
3	(Switzerland) Heini Baumgartner	99
4	(Norway) Rune Kristiansen	98
5	(United States) Ian Edmondson	94

- Standings after 42 races.

=== Moguls ===
Rank		Points
1	(Canada) Jean-Luc Brassard	732
2	(United States) Jonny Moseley	724
3	(France) Fabrice Ougier	716
4	(Canada) Stéphane Rochon	704
5	(United States) Jim Moran	628

- Standings after 11 races.

=== Aerials ===
Rank		Points
1	(France) Sébastien Foucras	832
2	(Austria) Christian Rijavec	808
3	(United States) Eric Bergoust	772
4	(France) Alexis Blanc	768
5	(Canada) Lloyd Langlois	764

- Standings after 12 races.

=== Ballet ===
Rank		Points
1	(Switzerland) Heini Baumgartner	696
2	(Norway) Rune Kristiansen	684
3	(United States) Ian Edmondson	656
4	(Finland) Antti Inberg	628
5	(United States) Steven Roxberg	600

- Standings after 10 races.

=== Dual moguls ===
Rank		Points
1	(Sweden) Jesper Rönnbäck	212
2	(Canada) Stéphane Rochon	192
3	(United States) Jonny Moseley	184
4	(Canada) John Smart	184
5	(United States) Jim Moran	160

- Standings after 3 races.

=== Combined ===
Rank		Points
1	(United States) Jonny Moseley	400
2	(Canada) David Belhumeur	392
3	information is not available
4	information is not available
5	information is not available

- Standings after 6 races.

== Ladies' standings ==
=== Overall ===
Rank		Points
1	(Canada) Katherina Kubenk	117
2	(United States) Donna Weinbrecht	99
3	(Russia) Elena Batalova	99
4	(Germany) Tatjana Mittermayer	96
5	(Switzerland) Colette Brand	96

- Standings after 35 races.

=== Moguls ===
Rank		Points
1	(United States) Donna Weinbrecht	792
2	(Germany) Tatjana Mittermayer	772
3	(France) Candice Gilg	768
4	(Finland) Minna Karhu	704
5	(United States) Ann Battelle	688

- Standings after 11 races.

=== Aerials ===
Rank		Points
1	(Switzerland) Colette Brand	860
2	(Canada) Veronica Brenner	852
3	(Canada) Caroline Olivier	808
4	(United States) Nikki Stone	784
5	(Australia) Kirstie Marshall	772

- Standings after 11 races.

=== Ballet ===
Rank		Points
1	(Russia) Elena Batalova	692
2	(Sweden) Annika Johansson	672
3	(Russia) Oksana Kushenko	644
4	(Russia) Natalia Razumovskaya	632
5	(Sweden) Åsa Magnusson	600

- Standings after 10 races.

=== Dual moguls ===
Rank		Points
1	(France) Candice Gilg	284
2	(United States) Donna Weinbrecht	280
3	(Germany) Tatjana Mittermayer	220
4	(Finland) Minna Karhu	200
5	(Russia) Liudmiła Dymchenko	180

- Standings after 3 races.
