= 1996–97 FIS Freestyle Skiing World Cup =

Freestyle skiing competitive season

Freestyle Skiing World Cup 1996/97
Discipline	Men	Women
Overall	(Canada) Darcy Downs	(United States) Stacey Blumer
Moguls	(Canada) Jean-Luc Brassard	(Germany) Tatjana Mittermayer
Dual moguls	(France) Thony Hemery	(France) Candice Gilg
Aerials	(Canada) Nicolas Fontaine	(Canada) Veronica Brenner
Ballet	(France) Fabrice Becker	(Russia) Elena Batalova
Combined	(Canada) Toben Sutherland	—

Competition
Locations	11	11
Individual	38	33

The 1996/97 FIS Freestyle Skiing World Cup was the eighteenth World Cup season in freestyle skiing organised by International Ski Federation. The season started on 5 December 1996 and ended on 15 March 1997. This season included five disciplines: aerials, moguls, dual moguls, ballet and combined.

This season combined events were last time on world cup calendar for men and none for ladies. Dual moguls counted as season title and was awarded with small crystal globe separately from moguls.

== Men ==
=== Moguls ===
Num	Season	Date	Place	Event	Winner	Second	Third
4	1	8 December 1996	(France) Tignes	DM	(Canada) Jean-Luc Brassard	(United States) Garth Hager	(Canada) Dominick Gauthier
5	2	15 December 1996	(France) La Plagne	DM	(France) Thony Hemery	(France) Johann Gregoire	(Sweden) Jesper Rönnback
6	3	18 January 1997	(Canada) Blackcomb	DM	(France) Thony Hemery	(Japan) Yugo Tsukita	(Switzerland) Petsch Moser
7	4	21 February 1997	(Austria) Kirchberg	DM	(France) Thony Hemery	(United States) Sean Smith	(Sweden) Jesper Rönnback
8	5	28 February 1997	(Switzerland) Meiringen-Hasliberg	DM	(France) Fabrice Ougier	(Sweden) Jonas Jonell	(Russia) Sergei Karpetchenko
9	6	15 March 1997	(Sweden) Hundfjället	DM	(France) Thony Hemery	(United States) Jonny Moseley	(France) Fabrice Ougier
161	1	6 December 1996	(France) Tignes	MO	(Sweden) Jesper Rönnback	(Russia) Andrei Ivanov	(Canada) Ryan Johnson
162	2	13 December 1996	(France) La Plagne	MO	(United States) Jonny Moseley	(Sweden) Jesper Rönnback	(Canada) Jean-Luc Brassard
163	3	9 January 1997	(Canada) Mont Tremblant	MO	(Sweden) Jesper Rönnback	(Canada) Stéphane Rochon	(Canada) Jean-Luc Brassard
164	4	12 January 1997	(United States) Lake Placid	MO	(Canada) Jean-Luc Brassard	(United States) Jonny Moseley	(France) Fabrice Ougier
165	5	24 January 1997	(United States) Breckenridge	MO	(Canada) Ryan Johnson	(Canada) Stéphane Rochon	(France) Thony Hemery
166	6	7 March 1997	(Austria) Altenmarkt-Zauchensee	MO	(Canada) Jean-Luc Brassard	(Canada) Stéphane Rochon	(France) Thony Hemery
167	7	13 March 1997	(Sweden) Hundfjället	MO	(France) Thony Hemery	(Canada) Stéphane Rochon	(Canada) Jean-Luc Brassard

=== Aerials ===
Num	Season	Date	Place	Event	Winner	Second	Third
159	1	7 December 1996	(France) Tignes	AE	(France) Alexis Blanc	(France) Sébastien Foucras	(Canada) Jeff Bean
160	2	14 December 1996	(France) La Plagne	AE	(France) Sébastien Foucras	(United States) Eric Bergoust	(Canada) Nicolas Fontaine
161	3	19 December 1996	(Italy) Piancavallo	AE	(United States) Matt Chojnacki	(France) Sébastien Foucras	(United States) Mariano Ferrario
162	4	8 January 1997	(Canada) Mont Tremblant	AE	(Austria) Christian Rijavec	(Canada) Lloyd Langlois	(France) Sébastien Foucras
163	5	11 January 1997	(United States) Lake Placid	AE	(Canada) Lloyd Langlois	(Austria) Christian Rijavec	(France) Jean-Damien Climonet
164	6	19 January 1997	(Canada) Blackcomb	AE	(Canada) Nicolas Fontaine	(Canada) Lloyd Langlois	(United States) Matt Chojnacki
165	7	25 January 1997	(United States) Breckenridge	AE	(United States) Joe Pack	(France) Jean-Damien Climonet	(Belarus) Dmitri Dashinski
166	8	26 January 1997	(United States) Breckenridge	AE	(Canada) Nicolas Fontaine	(Canada) Darcy Downs	(Canada) David Belhumeur
167	9	20 February 1997	(Austria) Kirchberg	AE	(Canada) Jeff Bean	(Canada) Nicolas Fontaine	(Canada) Andy Capicik
168	10	2 March 1997	(Switzerland) Meiringen-Hasliberg	AE	(United States) Eric Bergoust	(Switzerland) Andy Messerli	(France) Jean-Damien Climonet
169	11	7 March 1997	(Austria) Altenmarkt-Zauchensee	AE	(Canada) Nicolas Fontaine	(France) Jean-Damien Climonet	(Canada) Andy Capicik
170	12	14 March 1997	(Sweden) Hundfjället	AE	(Austria) Christian Rijavec	(Canada) David Belhumeur	(United States) Eric Bergoust

=== Ballet ===
Num	Season	Date	Place	Event	Winner	Second	Third
159	1	5 December 1996	(France) Tignes	AC	(Switzerland) Heini Baumgartner	(United States) Steven Roxberg	(Switzerland) Konrad Hilpert
160	2	21 December 1996	(Italy) Piancavallo	AC	(Switzerland) Heini Baumgartner	(France) Fabrice Becker	(United States) Ian Edmondson
161	3	13 January 1997	(United States) Lake Placid	AC	(France) Fabrice Becker	(United States) Steven Roxberg	(United States) Ian Edmondson
162	4	17 January 1997	(Canada) Blackcomb	AC	(France) Fabrice Becker	(Switzerland) Heini Baumgartner	(United States) Ian Edmondson
163	5	23 January 1997	(United States) Breckenridge	AC	(France) Fabrice Becker	(Switzerland) Heini Baumgartner	(United States) Ian Edmondson
164	6	19 February 1997	(Austria) Kirchberg	AC	(France) Fabrice Becker	(Finland) Antti Inberg	(United States) Steven Roxberg
165	7	1 March 1997	(Switzerland) Meiringen-Hasliberg	AC	(United States) Ian Edmondson	(France) Fabrice Becker	(Finland) Antti Inberg
166	8	8 March 1997	(Austria) Altenmarkt-Zauchensee	AC	(Switzerland) Heini Baumgartner	(United States) Ian Edmondson	(France) Fabrice Becker
167	9	12 March 1997	(Sweden) Hundfjället	AC	(United States) Ian Edmondson	(France) Fabrice Becker	(Switzerland) Konrad Hilpert

=== Combined ===
Num	Season	Date	Place	Event	Winner	Second	Third
143	1	13 January 1997	(United States) Lake Placid	CO	(Canada) Toben Sutherland	(United States) Chad St. Onge	information is not available
144	2	25 January 1997	(United States) Breckenridge	CO	(Canada) Toben Sutherland	(Canada) Darcy Downs	(United States) Chad St. Onge
145	3	8 March 1997	(Austria) Altenmarkt-Zauchensee	CO	(Canada) Darcy Downs	(Czech Republic) Ondřej Vokatý	(Canada) Toben Sutherland
146	4	12 March 1997	(Sweden) Hundfjället	CO	(Canada) Toben Sutherland	(Canada) Darcy Downs	information is not available

== Ladies ==
=== Moguls ===
Num	Season	Date	Place	Event	Winner	Second	Third
4	1	8 December 1996	(France) Tignes	DM	(United States) Liz McIntyre	(United States) Ann Battelle	(France) Candice Gilg
5	2	15 December 1996	(France) La Plagne	DM	(Finland) Minna Karhu	(United States) Donna Weinbrecht	(Germany) Tatjana Mittermayer
6	3	18 January 1997	(Canada) Blackcomb	DM	(Sweden) Marja Elfman	(France) Candice Gilg	(Finland) Minna Karhu
7	4	21 February 1997	(Austria) Kirchberg	DM	(France) Candice Gilg	(United States) Ann Battelle	(Norway) Kari Traa
8	5	28 February 1997	(Switzerland) Meiringen-Hasliberg	DM	(Norway) Kari Traa	(Finland) Minna Karhu	(Sweden) Marja Elfman
9	6	15 March 1997	(Sweden) Hundfjället	DM	(Sweden) Marja Elfman	(United States) Liz McIntyre	(France) Candice Gilg
161	1	6 December 1996	(France) Tignes	MO	(Germany) Tatjana Mittermayer	(France) Candice Gilg	(Finland) Minna Karhu
162	2	13 December 1996	(France) La Plagne	MO	(Germany) Tatjana Mittermayer	(United States) Donna Weinbrecht	(United States) Ann Battelle
163	3	9 January 1997	(Canada) Mont Tremblant	MO	(Norway) Kari Traa	(France) Candice Gilg	(United States) Donna Weinbrecht
164	4	12 January 1997	(United States) Lake Placid	MO	(Norway) Kari Traa	(Germany) Tatjana Mittermayer	(United States) Liz McIntyre
165	5	24 January 1997	(United States) Breckenridge	MO	(United States) Donna Weinbrecht	(Norway) Kari Traa	(Finland) Minna Karhu
166	6	7 March 1997	(Austria) Altenmarkt-Zauchensee	MO	(United States) Donna Weinbrecht	(France) Candice Gilg	(Germany) Tatjana Mittermayer
167	7	13 March 1997	(Sweden) Hundfjället	MO	(United States) Ann Battelle	(Germany) Tatjana Mittermayer	(Finland) Minna Karhu

=== Aerials ===
Num	Season	Date	Place	Event	Winner	Second	Third
161	1	7 December 1996	(France) Tignes	AE	(Canada) Veronica Brenner	(Switzerland) Karin Kuster	(Switzerland) Evelyne Leu
162	2	15 December 1996	(France) La Plagne	AE	(Canada) Veronica Brenner	(Switzerland) Michèle Rohrbach	(United States) Stacey Blumer
163	3	8 January 1997	(Canada) Mont Tremblant	AE	(Canada) Veronica Brenner	(Switzerland) Michèle Rohrbach	(Canada) Caroline Olivier
164	4	11 January 1997	(United States) Lake Placid	AE	(Australia) Kirstie Marshall	(Switzerland) Michèle Rohrbach	(Canada) Caroline Olivier
165	5	19 January 1997	(Canada) Blackcomb	AE	(Canada) Caroline Olivier	(Canada) Veronica Brenner	(Norway) Hilde Synnøve Lid
166	6	25 January 1997	(United States) Breckenridge	AE	(Australia) Kirstie Marshall	(China) Guo Dandan	(United States) Stacey Blumer
167	7	26 January 1997	(United States) Breckenridge	AE	(Canada) Veronica Brenner	(United States) Nikki Stone	(Switzerland) Michèle Rohrbach
168	8	20 February 1997	(Austria) Kirchberg	AE	(Canada) Caroline Olivier	(Canada) Veronica Brenner	(Russia) Natalia Orekhova
169	9	2 March 1997	(Switzerland) Meiringen-Hasliberg	AE	(Australia) Kirstie Marshall	(Australia) Jacqui Cooper	(Canada) Veronica Brenner
170	10	7 March 1997	(Austria) Altenmarkt-Zauchensee	AE	(Australia) Kirstie Marshall	(China) Xu Nannan	(Australia) Jacqui Cooper
171	11	14 March 1997	(Sweden) Hundfjället	AE	(Australia) Kirstie Marshall	(United States) Nikki Stone	(Canada) Veronica Brenner

=== Ballet ===
Num	Season	Date	Place	Event	Winner	Second	Third
160	1	5 December 1996	(France) Tignes	AC	(Russia) Elena Batalova	(Russia) Oksana Kushenko	(Sweden) Åsa Magnusson
161	2	21 December 1996	(Italy) Piancavallo	AC	(Russia) Elena Batalova	(Sweden) Annika Johansson	(Russia) Oksana Kushenko
162	3	13 January 1997	(United States) Lake Placid	AC	(Russia) Oksana Kushenko	(Sweden) Annika Johansson	(Sweden) Åsa Magnusson
163	4	17 January 1997	(Canada) Blackcomb	AC	(Russia) Oksana Kushenko	(Sweden) Annika Johansson	(Sweden) Åsa Magnusson
164	5	23 January 1997	(United States) Breckenridge	AC	(Russia) Elena Batalova	(Russia) Oksana Kushenko	(Sweden) Annika Johansson
165	6	19 February 1997	(Austria) Kirchberg	AC	(Russia) Oksana Kushenko	(Russia) Natalia Razumovskaya	(Sweden) Åsa Magnusson
166	7	1 March 1997	(Switzerland) Meiringen-Hasliberg	AC	(Russia) Elena Batalova	(Russia) Oksana Kushenko	(Russia) Natalia Razumovskaya
167	8	8 March 1997	(Austria) Altenmarkt-Zauchensee	AC	(Russia) Elena Batalova	(Russia) Natalia Razumovskaya	(Russia) Oksana Kushenko
168	9	12 March 1997	(Sweden) Hundfjället	AC	(Russia) Elena Batalova	(Russia) Oksana Kushenko	(Sweden) Annika Johansson

== Men's standings ==
=== Overall ===
Rank		Points
1	(United States) Darcy Downs	120
2	(France) Fabrice Becker	111
3	(Switzerland) Heini Baumgartner	95
4	(Canada) Jean-Luc Brassard	95
5	(United States) Ian Edmondson	95

- Standings after 38 races.

=== Moguls ===
Rank		Points
1	(Canada) Jean-Luc Brassard	476
2	(Canada) Stéphane Rochon	468
3	(Sweden) Jesper Rönnbäck	444
4	(France) Thony Hemery	440
5	(United States) Jonny Moseley	396

- Standings after 7 races.

=== Aerials ===
Rank		Points
1	(Canada) Nicolas Fontaine	824
2	(France) Jean-Damien Climonet	784
3	(Canada) Andy Capicik	728
4	(Canada) David Belhumeur	704
5	(Canada) Jeff Bean	612

- Standings after 12 races.

=== Ballet ===
Rank		Points
1	(France) Fabrice Becker	688
2	(Switzerland) Heini Baumgartner	668
3	(United States) Ian Edmondson	664
4	(United States) Steven Roxberg	612
5	(Finland) Antti Inberg	612

- Standings after 9 races.

=== Dual moguls ===
Rank		Points
1	(France) Thony Hemery	404
2	(Canada) Jean-Luc Brassard	368
3	(United States) Garth Hager	332
4	(Canada) Sean Smith	332
5	(United States) Jonny Moseley	320

- Standings after 6 races.

=== Combined ===
Rank		Points
1	(Canada) Toben Sutherland	392
2	(Canada) Darcy Downs	292
3	information is not available
4	information is not available
5	(Czech Republic) Aleš Valenta	88

- Standings after 4 races.

== Ladies' standings ==
=== Overall ===
Rank		Points
1	(United States) Stacey Blumer	100
2	(Russia) Elena Batalova	100
3	(Canada) Katherina Kubenk	99
4	(Canada) Veronica Brenner	97
5	(Germany) Tatjana Mittermayer	97

- Standings after 33 races.

=== Moguls ===
Rank		Points
1	(Germany) Tatjana Mittermayer	484
2	(France) Candice Gilg	464
3	(Finland) Minna Karhu	444
4	(United States) Donna Weinbrecht	432
5	(United States) Ann Battelle	432

- Standings after 7 races.

=== Aerials ===
Rank		Points
1	(Canada) Veronica Brenner	776
2	(Australia) Kirstie Marshall	728
3	(Canada) Caroline Olivier	708
4	(Switzerland) Michèle Rohrbach	688
5	(Australia) Jacqui Cooper	684

- Standings after 11 races.

=== Ballet ===
Rank		Points
1	(Russia) Elena Batalova	700
2	(Russia) Oksana Kushenko	676
3	(Sweden) Annika Johansson	648
4	(Sweden) Åsa Magnusson	624
5	(Spain) Raquel Gutiérrez	564

- Standings after 9 races.

=== Dual moguls ===
Rank		Points
1	(France) Candice Gilg	444
2	(Finland) Minna Karhu	440
3	(United States) Liz McIntyre	412
4	(United States) Ann Battelle	388
5	(Sweden) Marja Elfman	368

- Standings after 6 races.
