= 1994–95 FIS Freestyle Ski World Cup =

Freestyle skiing competitive season

Freestyle Skiing World Cup 1994/95
Discipline	Men	Women
Overall	(United States) Jonny Moseley	(United States) Kristean Porter
Moguls	(Russia) Sergey Shupletsov	(France) Raphaëlle Monod
Aerials	(United States) Trace Worthington	(United States) Nikki Stone
Ballet	(Norway) Rune Kristiansen	(United States) Ellen Breen
Combined	(United States) Trace Worthington	(Switzerland) Maja Schmid

Competition
Locations	12	12
Individual	40	40

The 1994/95 FIS Freestyle Skiing World Cup was the sixteenth World Cup season in freestyle skiing organised by International Ski Federation. The season started on 15 December 1994 and ended on 11 March 1995. This season included four disciplines: aerials, moguls, ballet and combined. This was the last season when combined events were in world cup calendar for ladies.

== Men ==
=== Aerials ===
Num	Season	Date	Place	Event	Winner	Second	Third
136	1	17 December 1994	(France) Tignes	AE	(Canada) Lloyd Langlois	(France) Sébastien Foucras	(Belarus) Vasilli Vorobiov
137	2	21 December 1994	(Italy) Piancavallo	AE	(Austria) Christian Rijavec	(United Kingdom) Richard Cobbing	(France) Alexis Blanc
138	3	8 January 1995	(Canada) Blackcomb	AE	(Austria) Christian Rijavec	(France) Sébastien Foucras	(Canada) Nicolas Fontaine
139	4	15 January 1995	(United States) Breckenridge	AE	(Austria) Christian Rijavec	(France) Sébastien Foucras	(United States) Trace Worthington
140	5	22 January 1995	(Canada) Le Relais	AE	(United States) Trace Worthington	(United States) Kris Feddersen	(Canada) Lloyd Langlois
141	6	28 January 1995	(United States) Lake Placid	AE	(United States) Trace Worthington	(France) Sébastien Foucras	(United States) Kris Feddersen
142	7	4 February 1995	(Germany) Oberjoch	AE	(France) Alexis Blanc	(United States) Trace Worthington	(United States) Kris Feddersen
143	8	10 February 1995	(Austria) Altenmarkt-Zauchensee	AE	(United States) Trace Worthington	(France) Sébastien Foucras	(Canada) Nicolas Fontaine
144	9	24 February 1995	(Austria) Kirchberg	AE	(United States) Kip Griffin	(Germany) Alexander Auerswald	(Canada) Lloyd Langlois
145	10	4 March 1995	(Norway) Lillehammer	AE	(France) Sébastien Foucras	(United States) Trace Worthington	(Austria) Christian Rijavec
146	11	11 March 1995	(Sweden) Hundfjället	AE	(United States) Trace Worthington	(Austria) Christian Rijavec	(France) Sébastien Foucras

=== Moguls ===
Num	Season	Date	Place	Event	Winner	Second	Third
140	1	15 December 1994	(France) Tignes	MO	(Russia) Sergey Shupletsov	(France) Edgar Grospiron	(France) David Carpano
141	2	7 January 1995	(Canada) Blackcomb	MO	(Russia) Sergey Shupletsov	(France) Edgar Grospiron	(Canada) Jean-Luc Brassard
142	3	14 January 1995	(United States) Breckenridge	MO	(Russia) Sergey Shupletsov	(United States) Evan Dybvig	(Canada) John Smart
143	4	21 January 1995	(Canada) Le Relais	MO	(Russia) Sergey Shupletsov	(France) Edgar Grospiron	(Canada) John Smart
144	5	27 January 1995	(United States) Lake Placid	MO	(Russia) Sergey Shupletsov	(Canada) John Smart	(Canada) Jean-Luc Brassard
145	6	3 February 1995	(Germany) Oberjoch	MO	(France) Edgar Grospiron	(France) Youri Gilg	(Canada) Stéphane Rochon
146	7	8 February 1995	(Switzerland) Meiringen-Hasliberg	MO	(France) Edgar Grospiron	(Russia) Sergey Shupletsov	(France) Johann Gregoire
147	8	22 February 1995	(Austria) Kirchberg	MO	(Russia) Sergey Shupletsov	(Canada) Jean-Luc Brassard	(Canada) Dominick Gauthier
148	9	5 March 1995	(Norway) Lillehammer	MO	(Canada) Dominick Gauthier	(Russia) Sergey Shupletsov	(France) Edgar Grospiron
149	10	9 March 1995	(Sweden) Hundfjället	MO	(France) Olivier Cotte	(Russia) Sergey Shupletsov	(Canada) Jean-Luc Brassard

=== Ballet ===
Num	Season	Date	Place	Event	Winner	Second	Third
139	1	16 December 1994	(France) Tignes	AC	(France) Fabrice Becker	(Switzerland) Heini Baumgartner	(Czech Republic) Pavel Landa
140	2	6 January 1995	(Canada) Blackcomb	AC	(Switzerland) Heini Baumgartner	(United States) Ian Edmondson	(United States) Jason Bodnar
141	3	13 January 1995	(United States) Breckenridge	AC	(Norway) Rune Kristiansen	(France) Fabrice Becker	(Switzerland) Heini Baumgartner
142	4	20 January 1995	(Canada) Le Relais	AC	(France) Fabrice Becker	(Switzerland) Heini Baumgartner	(United States) Ian Edmondson
143	5	26 January 1995	(United States) Lake Placid	AC	(Norway) Rune Kristiansen	(France) Fabrice Becker	(Switzerland) Heini Baumgartner
144	6	2 February 1995	(Germany) Oberjoch	AC	(Norway) Rune Kristiansen	(France) Fabrice Becker	(Switzerland) Heini Baumgartner
145	7	9 February 1995	(Austria) Altenmarkt-Zauchensee	AC	(Norway) Rune Kristiansen	(Switzerland) Heini Baumgartner	(Canada) Darcy Downs
146	8	21 February 1995	(Austria) Kirchberg	AC	(Norway) Rune Kristiansen	(Switzerland) Heini Baumgartner	(France) Fabrice Becker
147	9	3 March 1995	(Norway) Lillehammer	AC	(Norway) Rune Kristiansen	(Switzerland) Heini Baumgartner	(United States) Steven Roxberg
148	10	8 March 1995	(Sweden) Hundfjället	AC	(France) Fabrice Becker	(Switzerland) Heini Baumgartner	(Norway) Rune Kristiansen

=== Combined ===
Num	Season	Date	Place	Event	Winner	Second	Third
128	1	17 December 1994	(France) Tignes	CO	(United States) Trace Worthington	(United States) Jonny Moseley	(Canada) David Belhumeur
129	2	8 January 1995	(Canada) Blackcomb	CO	(Canada) Darcy Downs	(United States) Trace Worthington	(Canada) David Belhumeur
130	3	15 January 1995	(United States) Breckenridge	CO	(United States) Trace Worthington	(Canada) Darcy Downs	(United States) Jonny Moseley
131	4	21 January 1995	(Canada) Le Relais	CO	(United States) Trace Worthington	(Canada) Darcy Downs	(Canada) David Belhumeur
132	5	28 January 1995	(United States) Lake Placid	CO	(United States) Trace Worthington	(Canada) Darcy Downs	(Canada) David Belhumeur
133	6	4 February 1995	(Germany) Oberjoch	CO	(United States) Trace Worthington	(Canada) Darcy Downs	(Canada) David Belhumeur
134	7	24 February 1995	(Austria) Kirchberg	CO	(United States) Jonny Moseley	(Canada) David Belhumeur	(United States) Trace Worthington
135	8	5 March 1995	(Norway) Lillehammer	CO	(United States) Trace Worthington	(United States) Jonny Moseley	(Canada) David Belhumeur
136	9	10 March 1995	(Sweden) Hundfjället	CO	(United States) Jonny Moseley	(Canada) David Belhumeur	(United States) Trace Worthington

== Ladies ==
=== Aerials ===
Num	Season	Date	Place	Event	Winner	Second	Third
139	1	17 December 1994	(France) Tignes	AE	(Norway) Hilde Synnøve Lid	(Switzerland) Colette Brand	(Russia) Natalia Orekhova
140	2	21 December 1994	(Italy) Piancavallo	AE	(Switzerland) Colette Brand	(Canada) Caroline Olivier	(Australia) Kirstie Marshall
141	3	8 January 1995	(Canada) Blackcomb	AE	(Australia) Kirstie Marshall	(Sweden) Marie Lindgren	(Switzerland) Karin Kuster
142	4	15 January 1995	(United States) Breckenridge	AE	(United States) Nikki Stone	(Australia) Kirstie Marshall	(Switzerland) Maja Schmid
143	5	22 January 1995	(Canada) Le Relais	AE	(United States) Nikki Stone	(Sweden) Marie Lindgren	(Switzerland) Karin Kuster
144	6	28 January 1995	(United States) Lake Placid	AE	(Switzerland) Colette Brand	(Australia) Kirstie Marshall	(United States) Nikki Stone
145	7	4 February 1995	(Germany) Oberjoch	AE	(Switzerland) Colette Brand	(United States) Nikki Stone	(Australia) Kirstie Marshall
146	8	10 February 1995	(Austria) Altenmarkt-Zauchensee	AE	(Norway) Hilde Synnøve Lid	(Switzerland) Colette Brand	(United States) Nikki Stone
147	9	24 February 1995	(Austria) Kirchberg	AE	(United States) Nikki Stone	(Norway) Hilde Synnøve Lid	(Sweden) Marie Lindgren
148	10	4 March 1995	(Norway) Lillehammer	AE	(United States) Nikki Stone	(Australia) Kirstie Marshall	(Sweden) Marie Lindgren
149	11	11 March 1995	(Sweden) Hundfjället	AE	(Switzerland) Colette Brand	(United States) Nikki Stone	(Sweden) Marie Lindgren

=== Moguls ===
Num	Season	Date	Place	Event	Winner	Second	Third
140	1	15 December 1994	(France) Tignes	MO	(Germany) Tatjana Mittermayer	(France) Raphaëlle Monod	(France) Candice Gilg
141	2	7 January 1995	(Canada) Blackcomb	MO	(France) Raphaëlle Monod	(United States) Liz McIntyre	(United States) Donna Weinbrecht
142	3	14 January 1995	(United States) Breckenridge	MO	(United States) Donna Weinbrecht	(United States) Liz McIntyre	(France) Raphaëlle Monod
143	4	21 January 1995	(Canada) Le Relais	MO	(France) Raphaëlle Monod	(Germany) Tatjana Mittermayer	(France) Candice Gilg
144	5	27 January 1995	(United States) Lake Placid	MO	(United States) Donna Weinbrecht	(Russia) Ljudmila Dymchenko	(Russia) Yelizaveta Kozhevnikova
145	6	3 February 1995	(Germany) Oberjoch	MO	(Germany) Tatjana Mittermayer	(France) Raphaëlle Monod	(France) Candice Gilg
146	7	8 February 1995	(Switzerland) Meiringen-Hasliberg	MO	(Germany) Tatjana Mittermayer	(France) Anne Cattelin	(Sweden) Jenny Eidolf
147	8	22 February 1995	(Austria) Kirchberg	MO	(United States) Donna Weinbrecht	(France) Candice Gilg	(United States) Ann Battelle
148	9	5 March 1995	(Norway) Lillehammer	MO	(Russia) Ljudmila Dymchenko	(United States) Donna Weinbrecht	(France) Candice Gilg
149	10	9 March 1995	(Sweden) Hundfjället	MO	(France) Raphaëlle Monod	(Russia) Ljudmila Dymchenko	(Germany) Tatjana Mittermayer

=== Ballet ===
Num	Season	Date	Place	Event	Winner	Second	Third
140	1	16 December 1994	(France) Tignes	AC	(United States) Ellen Breen	(Russia) Oksana Kushenko	(Russia) Elena Batalova
141	2	6 January 1995	(Canada) Blackcomb	AC	(United States) Ellen Breen	(France) Cathy Fechoz	(Russia) Oksana Kushenko
142	3	13 January 1995	(United States) Breckenridge	AC	(United States) Ellen Breen	(Sweden) Annika Johansson	(Sweden) Åsa Magnusson
143	4	20 January 1995	(Canada) Le Relais	AC	(United States) Ellen Breen	(Russia) Oksana Kushenko	(France) Cathy Fechoz
144	5	26 January 1995	(United States) Lake Placid	AC	(United States) Ellen Breen	(Russia) Oksana Kushenko	(Spain) Raquel Gutiérrez
145	6	2 February 1995	(Germany) Oberjoch	AC	(United States) Ellen Breen	(France) Cathy Fechoz	(Sweden) Annika Johansson
146	7	9 February 1995	(Austria) Altenmarkt-Zauchensee	AC	(United States) Ellen Breen	(United States) Maria Guarnieri	(Netherlands) Jeannette Witte
147	8	21 February 1995	(Austria) Kirchberg	AC	(Russia) Elena Batalova	(France) Cathy Fechoz	(United States) Ellen Breen
148	9	3 March 1995	(Norway) Lillehammer	AC	(Russia) Elena Batalova	(Russia) Oksana Kushenko	(France) Cathy Fechoz
149	10	8 March 1995	(Sweden) Hundfjället	AC	(Russia) Elena Batalova	(United States) Ellen Breen	(France) Cathy Fechoz

=== Combined ===
Num	Season	Date	Place	Event	Winner	Second	Third
131	1	17 December 1994	(France) Tignes	CO	(Russia) Natalia Orekhova	(Canada) Katherina Kubenk	(Switzerland) Maja Schmid
132	2	8 January 1995	(Canada) Blackcomb	CO	(Switzerland) Maja Schmid	(Canada) Katherina Kubenk	(United States) Kristean Porter
133	3	15 January 1995	(United States) Breckenridge	CO	(Switzerland) Maja Schmid	(United States) Kristean Porter	(Russia) Natalia Orekhova
134	4	22 January 1995	(Canada) Le Relais	CO	(United States) Kristean Porter	(Switzerland) Maja Schmid	(Canada) Katherina Kubenk
135	5	28 January 1995	(United States) Lake Placid	CO	(United States) Kristean Porter	(Canada) Katherina Kubenk	(Switzerland) Maja Schmid
136	6	4 February 1995	(Germany) Oberjoch	CO	(Switzerland) Maja Schmid	(Canada) Katherina Kubenk	(United States) Kristean Porter
137	7	24 February 1995	(Austria) Kirchberg	CO	(United States) Kristean Porter	(Switzerland) Maja Schmid	information is not available
138	8	5 March 1995	(Norway) Lillehammer	CO	(Russia) Natalia Orekhova	(United States) Kristean Porter	(Switzerland) Maja Schmid
139	9	10 March 1995	(Sweden) Hundfjället	CO	(Switzerland) Maja Schmid	(Russia) Natalia Orekhova	(United States) Kristean Porter

== Men's standings ==
=== Overall ===
Rank		Points
1	(United States) Jonny Moseley	164
2	(United States) Trace Worthington	156
3	(Canada) David Belhumeur	138
4	(Canada) Darcy Downs	137
5	(France) Fabrice Becker	104

- Standings after 40 races.

=== Moguls ===
Rank		Points
1	(Russia) Sergey Shupletsov	694
2	(France) Edgar Grospiron	664
3	(Canada) Jean-Luc Brassard	636
4	(Canada) John Smart	596
5	(Canada) Dominick Gauthier	572

- Standings after 10 races.

=== Aerials ===
Rank		Points
1	(United States) Trace Worthington	772
2	(France) Sébastien Foucras	752
3	(Austria) Christian Rijavec	744
4	(France) Alexis Blanc	664
5	(United States) Kris Feddersen	616

- Standings after 11 races.

=== Ballet ===
Rank		Points
1	(Norway) Rune Kristiansen	692
2	(France) Fabrice Becker	680
3	(Switzerland) Heini Baumgartner	676
4	(United States) Steven Roxberg	576
5	(Canada) Darcy Downs	560

- Standings after 10 races.

=== Combined ===
Rank		Points
1	(United States) Trace Worthington	600
2	(Canada) Darcy Downs	572
3	(United States) Jonny Moseley	572
4	(Canada) David Belhumeur	560
5	(Belarus) Oleg Kouleshov	256

- Standings after 9 races.

== Ladies' standings ==
=== Overall ===
Rank		Points
1	(United States) Kristean Porter	163
2	(Switzerland) Maja Schmid	157
3	(Canada) Katherina Kubenk	144
4	(Russia) Natalia Orekhova	128
5	(United States) Ellen Breen	100

- Standings after 40 races.

=== Moguls ===
Rank		Points
1	(France) Raphaëlle Monod	672
2	(United States) Donna Weinbrecht	664
3	(Germany) Tatjana Mittermayer	648
4	(France) Candice Gilg	636
5	(Russia) Ljudmila Dymchenko	620

- Standings after 10 races.

=== Aerials ===
Rank		Points
1	(United States) Nikki Stone	776
2	(Australia) Kirstie Marshall	744
3	(Switzerland) Colette Brand	740
4	(Norway) Hilde Synnøve Lid	716
5	(Canada) Caroline Olivier	688

- Standings after 11 races.

=== Ballet ===
Rank		Points
1	(United States) Ellen Breen	700
2	(Russia) Oksana Kushenko	648
3	(France) Cathy Fechoz	648
4	(Sweden) Annika Johansson	616
5	(Sweden) Åsa Magnusson	556

- Standings after 10 races.

=== Combined ===
Rank		Points
1	(Switzerland) Maja Schmid	592
2	(United States) Kristean Porter	584
3	(Canada) Katherina Kubenk	564
4	(Russia) Natalia Orekhova	476
5	(Australia) Tarsha Ebbern	88

- Standings after 9 races.
