= 1990–91 FIS Freestyle Ski World Cup =

Freestyle skiing competitive season

Freestyle Skiing World Cup 1990/91
Discipline	Men	Women
Overall	(France) Éric Laboureix	(Switzerland) Conny Kissling
Moguls	(France) Edgar Grospiron	(United States) Donna Weinbrecht
Aerials	(Canada) Philippe LaRoche	(Germany) Elfie Simchen
Ballet	(Norway) Rune Kristiansen	(Switzerland) Conny Kissling
Combined	(France) Éric Laboureix	(Switzerland) Conny Kissling

Competition
Locations	13	13
Individual	50	50

The 1990/91 FIS Freestyle Skiing World Cup was the twelfth World Cup season in freestyle skiing organised by International Ski Federation. The season started on 30 November 1990 and ended on 23 March 1991. This season included four disciplines: aerials, moguls, ballet and combined.

== Men ==
=== Aerials ===
Num	Season	Date	Place	Event	Winner	Second	Third
92	1	1 December 1990	(France) La Plagne	AE	(Switzerland) Michel Roth	(Canada) Lloyd Langlois	(Austria) Alexander Stögner
93	2	7 December 1990	(France) Tignes	AE	(Canada) Lloyd Langlois	(Canada) Philippe LaRoche	(United States) Trace Worthington
94	3	16 December 1990	(Switzerland) Zermatt	AE	(Canada) Philippe LaRoche	(France) Jean-Marc Bacquin	(United States) Chip Milner
95	4	21 December 1990	(Italy) Piancavallo	AE	(United States) Kris Feddersen	(Canada) Philippe LaRoche	(France) Jean-Marc Bacquin
96	5	13 January 1991	(Canada) Blackcomb	AE	(Canada) Lloyd Langlois	(France) Jean-Marc Bacquin	(France) Jean-Damien Climonet
97	6	20 January 1991	(United States) Breckenridge	AE	(Canada) Philippe LaRoche	(Canada) Nicolas Fontaine	(United States) Kris Feddersen
98	7	3 February 1991	(Canada) Mont Gabriel	AE	(Canada) Philippe LaRoche	(Canada) Lloyd Langlois	(Canada) Jean-Marc Rozon
99	8	21 February 1991	(France) La Clusaz	AE	(France) Didier Méda	(United States) Trace Worthington	(France) Jean-Marc Bacquin
100	9	26 February 1991	(Soviet Union) Skole	AE	(United States) Trace Worthington	(United States) Kris Feddersen	(Soviet Union) Andrej Lisitskij
101	10	3 March 1991	(Germany) Oberjoch	AE	(France) Didier Méda	(Canada) Philippe LaRoche	(United States) Kris Feddersen
102	11	10 March 1991	(Norway) Voss	AE	(France) Didier Méda	(Austria) Alexander Stögner	(United States) Trace Worthington
103	12	17 March 1991	(Finland) Pyhätunturi	AE	(France) Didier Méda	(France) Jean-Marc Bacquin	(France) Alexis Blanc
104	13	21 March 1991	(Sweden) Hundfjället	AE	(Canada) Philippe LaRoche	(United States) Kris Feddersen	(France) Jean-Damien Climonet

=== Ballet ===
Num	Season	Date	Place	Event	Winner	Second	Third
94	1	2 December 1990	(France) La Plagne	AC	(Germany) Hermann Reitberger	(Norway) Rune Kristiansen	(United States) Lane Spina
95	2	8 December 1990	(France) Tignes	AC	(Italy) Roberto Franco	(United States) Lane Spina	(Norway) Rune Kristiansen
96	3	14 December 1990	(Switzerland) Zermatt	AC	(United States) Lane Spina	(Switzerland) Heini Baumgartner	(Germany) Armin Weiss
97	4	20 December 1990	(Italy) Piancavallo	AC	(Norway) Rune Kristiansen	(United States) Lane Spina	(Canada) Dave Walker
98	5	11 January 1991	(Canada) Blackcomb	AC	(Norway) Rune Kristiansen	(Germany) Hermann Reitberger	(Italy) Roberto Franco
99	6	17 January 1991	(United States) Breckenridge	AE	(Norway) Rune Kristiansen	(United States) Lane Spina	(Canada) Dave Walker
100	7	1 February 1991	(Canada) Mont Gabriel	AC	(Norway) Rune Kristiansen	(Germany) Hermann Reitberger	(Italy) Roberto Franco
101	8	19 February 1991	(France) La Clusaz	AC	(Norway) Rune Kristiansen	(Germany) Hermann Reitberger	(France) Fabrice Becker
102	9	24 February 1991	(Soviet Union) Skole	AC	(Norway) Rune Kristiansen	(Italy) Roberto Franco	(Canada) Dave Walker
103	10	2 March 1991	(Germany) Oberjoch	AC	(Germany) Hermann Reitberger	(Norway) Rune Kristiansen	(France) Fabrice Becker
104	11	8 March 1991	(Norway) Voss	AC	(Canada) Richard Pierce	(Canada) Dave Walker	(Norway) Rune Kristiansen
105	12	14 March 1991	(Finland) Pyhätunturi	AC	(Norway) Rune Kristiansen	(United States) Lane Spina	(Canada) Dave Walker
106	13	22 March 1991	(Sweden) Hundfjället	AC	(United States) Lane Spina	(Norway) Rune Kristiansen	(Germany) Armin Weiss

=== Moguls ===
Num	Season	Date	Place	Event	Winner	Second	Third
94	1	30 November 1990	(France) La Plagne	MO	(France) Edgar Grospiron	(Norway) Hans Engelsen Eide	(France) Éric Berthon
95	2	6 December 1990	(France) Tignes	MO	(France) Éric Berthon	(France) Edgar Grospiron	(Norway) Hans Engelsen Eide
96	3	15 December 1990	(Switzerland) Zermatt	MO	(Canada) John Smart	(France) Éric Berthon	(France) Olivier Allamand
97	4	12 January 1991	(Canada) Blackcomb	MO	(United States) Nelson Carmichael	(Canada) Christian Marcoux	(Norway) Hans Engelsen Eide
98	5	18 January 1991	(United States) Breckenridge	MO	(France) Edgar Grospiron	(Norway) Hans Engelsen Eide	(Canada) John Smart
99	6	19 January 1991	(United States) Breckenridge	MO	(France) Edgar Grospiron	(Canada) Jean-Luc Brassard	(France) Youri Gilg
100	7	2 February 1991	(Canada) Mont Gabriel	MO	(Canada) Jean-Luc Brassard	(France) Youri Gilg	(United States) Nelson Carmichael
101	8	20 February 1991	(France) La Clusaz	MO	(France) Olivier Allamand	(France) Éric Berthon	(Norway) Hans Engelsen Eide
102	9	25 February 1991	(Soviet Union) Skole	MO	(France) Edgar Grospiron	(Canada) John Smart	(United States) Chuck Martin
103	10	9 March 1991	(Norway) Voss	MO	(France) Olivier Allamand	(Norway) Hans Engelsen Eide	(United States) Nelson Carmichael
104	11	16 March 1991	(Finland) Pyhätunturi	MO	(United States) Nelson Carmichael	(Soviet Union) Sergey Shupletsov	(France) Edgar Grospiron
105	12	23 March 1991	(Sweden) Hundfjället	MO	(France) Youri Gilg	(Sweden) Leif Persson	(France) Edgar Grospiron

=== Combined ===
Num	Season	Date	Place	Event	Winner	Second	Third
87	1	2 December 1990	(France) La Plagne	CO	(Soviet Union) Sergey Shupletsov	(United States) Trace Worthington	(Spain) Rafael Herrero
88	2	8 December 1990	(France) Tignes	CO	(United States) Trace Worthington	(Soviet Union) Sergey Shupletsov	(Canada) Jeff Viola
89	3	16 December 1990	(Switzerland) Zermatt	CO	(France) Youri Gilg	(United States) Trace Worthington	(Canada) Jeff Viola
90	4	13 January 1991	(Canada) Blackcomb	CO	(France) Éric Laboureix	(France) Youri Gilg	(Canada) Murray Cluff
91	5	19 January 1991	(United States) Breckenridge	CO	(United States) Trace Worthington	(France) Youri Gilg	(Spain) Rafael Herrero
92	6	20 January 1991	(United States) Breckenridge	CO	(France) Éric Laboureix	(France) Youri Gilg	(United States) Trace Worthington
93	7	3 February 1991	(Canada) Mont Gabriel	CO	(United States) Trace Worthington	(France) Youri Gilg	(Canada) Jeff Viola
94	8	21 February 1991	(France) La Clusaz	CO	(France) Éric Laboureix	(United States) Trace Worthington	(France) Youri Gilg
95	9	26 February 1991	(Soviet Union) Skole	CO	(France) Éric Laboureix	(United States) Trace Worthington	(Canada) Jeff Viola
96	10	10 March 1991	(Norway) Voss	CO	(France) Éric Laboureix	(United States) Trace Worthington	(France) Youri Gilg
97	11	17 March 1991	(Finland) Pyhätunturi	CO	(France) Éric Laboureix	(United States) Trace Worthington	(France) Youri Gilg
98	12	23 March 1991	(Sweden) Hundfjället	CO	(France) Éric Laboureix	(France) Youri Gilg	(Canada) David Belhumeur

== Ladies ==
=== Aerials ===
Num	Season	Date	Place	Event	Winner	Second	Third
94	1	1 December 1990	(France) La Plagne	AE	(Switzerland) Sabine Horvath	(United States) Jodie Spiegel	(Norway) Hilde Synnøve Lid
95	2	7 December 1990	(France) Tignes	AE	(France) Catherine Lombard	(Germany) Elfie Simchen	(Australia) Kirstie Marshall
96	3	16 December 1990	(Switzerland) Zermatt	AE	(Sweden) Liselotte Johansson	(Norway) Hilde Synnøve Lid	(Germany) Elfie Simchen
97	4	21 December 1990	(Italy) Piancavallo	AE	(Germany) Elfie Simchen	(Australia) Kirstie Marshall	(United States) Sue Michalski-Cagen
98	5	13 January 1991	(Canada) Blackcomb	AE	(Australia) Kirstie Marshall	(Sweden) Marie Lindgren	(Switzerland) Colette Brand
99	6	20 January 1991	(United States) Breckenridge	AE	(Sweden) Marie Lindgren	(Australia) Kirstie Marshall	(Germany) Elfie Simchen
100	7	3 February 1991	(Canada) Mont Gabriel	AE	(Germany) Elfie Simchen	(Soviet Union) Lina Cheryazova	(Australia) Kirstie Marshall
101	8	21 February 1991	(France) La Clusaz	AE	(Switzerland) Sabine Horvath	(Switzerland) Conny Kissling	(Norway) Hilde Synnøve Lid
102	9	26 February 1991	(Soviet Union) Skole	AE	(Australia) Kirstie Marshall	(Soviet Union) Lina Cheryazova	information is not available
103	10	3 March 1991	(Germany) Oberjoch	AE	(Germany) Sonja Reichart	(Germany) Elfie Simchen	(Australia) Kirstie Marshall
104	11	10 March 1991	(Norway) Voss	AE	(Germany) Elfie Simchen	(Australia) Kirstie Marshall	(Norway) Hilde Synnøve Lid
105	12	17 March 1991	(Finland) Pyhätunturi	AE	(Germany) Elfie Simchen	(Switzerland) Colette Brand	(Soviet Union) Lina Cheryazova
106	13	21 March 1991	(Sweden) Hundfjället	AE	(Switzerland) Colette Brand	(Germany) Elfie Simchen	(Australia) Kirstie Marshall

=== Ballet ===
Num	Season	Date	Place	Event	Winner	Second	Third
95	1	2 December 1990	(France) La Plagne	AC	(France) Cathy Fechoz	(United States) Jan Bucher	(United States) Ellen Breen
96	2	8 December 1990	(France) Tignes	AC	(Switzerland) Conny Kissling	(United States) Ellen Breen	(United States) Jan Bucher
97	3	14 December 1990	(Switzerland) Zermatt	AC	(Switzerland) Conny Kissling	(United States) Jan Bucher	(Sweden) Åsa Magnusson
98	4	20 December 1990	(Italy) Piancavallo	AC	(Switzerland) Conny Kissling	(United States) Jan Bucher	(France) Cathy Fechoz
99	5	11 January 1991	(Canada) Blackcomb	AC	(Switzerland) Conny Kissling	(United States) Jan Bucher	(United States) Ellen Breen
100	6	17 January 1991	(United States) Breckenridge	AC	(Switzerland) Conny Kissling	(United States) Jan Bucher	(United States) Ellen Breen
101	7	1 February 1991	(Canada) Mont Gabriel	AC	(Switzerland) Conny Kissling	(United States) Jan Bucher	(United States) Ellen Breen
102	8	19 February 1991	(France) La Clusaz	AC	(United States) Ellen Breen	(Switzerland) Conny Kissling	(France) Cathy Fechoz
103	9	24 February 1991	(Soviet Union) Skole	AC	(Switzerland) Conny Kissling	(France) Cathy Fechoz	(United States) Sharon Petzold
104	10	2 March 1991	(Germany) Oberjoch	AC	(Switzerland) Conny Kissling	(United States) Ellen Breen	(France) Nadège Ferrier
105	11	8 March 1991	(Norway) Voss	AC	(United States) Ellen Breen	(United States) Jan Bucher	(Switzerland) Conny Kissling
106	12	14 March 1991	(Finland) Pyhätunturi	AC	(Switzerland) Conny Kissling	(United States) Jan Bucher	(Sweden) Åsa Magnusson
107	13	22 March 1991	(Sweden) Hundfjället	AC	(Switzerland) Conny Kissling	(United States) Jan Bucher	(United States) Ellen Breen

=== Moguls ===
Num	Season	Date	Place	Event	Winner	Second	Third
94	1	30 November 1990	(France) La Plagne	MO	(France) Raphaëlle Monod	(United States) Donna Weinbrecht	(Norway) Stine Lise Hattestad
95	2	6 December 1990	(France) Tignes	MO	(Soviet Union) Yelizaveta Kozhevnikova	(France) Raphaëlle Monod	(Norway) Stine Lise Hattestad
96	3	15 December 1990	(Switzerland) Zermatt	MO	(United States) Donna Weinbrecht	(France) Raphaëlle Monod	(Norway) Stine Lise Hattestad
97	4	12 January 1991	(Canada) Blackcomb	MO	(United States) Donna Weinbrecht	(France) Raphaëlle Monod	(United States) Maggie Connor
98	5	18 January 1991	(United States) Breckenridge	MO	(United States) Donna Weinbrecht	(Germany) Birgit Keppler-Stein	(Italy) Silvia Marciandi
99	6	19 January 1991	(United States) Breckenridge	MO	(United States) Donna Weinbrecht	(France) Raphaëlle Monod	(Germany) Tatjana Mittermayer
100	7	2 February 1991	(Canada) Mont Gabriel	MO	(United States) Donna Weinbrecht	(Soviet Union) Yelizaveta Kozhevnikova	(Germany) Tatjana Mittermayer
101	8	20 February 1991	(France) La Clusaz	MO	(United States) Donna Weinbrecht	(United States) Maggie Connor	(Germany) Tatjana Mittermayer
102	9	25 February 1991	(Soviet Union) Skole	MO	(Soviet Union) Yelizaveta Kozhevnikova	(Canada) LeeLee Morrison	(United States) Donna Weinbrecht
103	10	9 March 1991	(Norway) Voss	MO	(Canada) LeeLee Morrison	(United States) Donna Weinbrecht	(Norway) Stine Lise Hattestad
104	11	16 March 1991	(Finland) Pyhätunturi	MO	(Soviet Union) Yelizaveta Kozhevnikova	(Canada) LeeLee Morrison	(United States) Donna Weinbrecht
105	12	23 March 1991	(Sweden) Hundfjället	MO	(United States) Donna Weinbrecht	(Norway) Stine Lise Hattestad	(Canada) LeeLee Morrison

=== Combined ===
Num	Season	Date	Place	Event	Winner	Second	Third
89	1	2 December 1990	(France) La Plagne	CO	(United Kingdom) Jilly Curry	(United States) Kristean Porter	(Canada) Katherina Kubenk
90	2	8 December 1990	(France) Tignes	CO	(Switzerland) Conny Kissling	(United Kingdom) Jilly Curry	(Canada) Katherina Kubenk
91	3	16 December 1990	(Switzerland) Zermatt	CO	(Switzerland) Conny Kissling	(Switzerland) Maja Schmid	(Canada) Katherina Kubenk
92	4	13 January 1991	(Canada) Blackcomb	CO	(Switzerland) Conny Kissling	(Switzerland) Maja Schmid	(United Kingdom) Jilly Curry
93	5	19 January 1991	(United States) Breckenridge	CO	(Switzerland) Conny Kissling	(United Kingdom) Jilly Curry	(Switzerland) Maja Schmid
94	6	20 January 1991	(United States) Breckenridge	CO	(Switzerland) Conny Kissling	(United States) Kristean Porter	(United Kingdom) Jilly Curry
95	7	3 February 1991	(Canada) Mont Gabriel	CO	(Switzerland) Conny Kissling	(United Kingdom) Jilly Curry	(Canada) Katherina Kubenk
96	8	21 February 1991	(France) La Clusaz	CO	(Switzerland) Conny Kissling	(Switzerland) Maja Schmid	(United Kingdom) Jilly Curry
97	9	26 February 1991	(Soviet Union) Skole	CO	(Switzerland) Conny Kissling	(Switzerland) Maja Schmid	(United States) Kristean Porter
98	10	10 March 1991	(Norway) Voss	CO	(Switzerland) Conny Kissling	(United Kingdom) Jilly Curry	(New Zealand) Kylie Gill
99	11	17 March 1991	(Finland) Pyhätunturi	CO	(Switzerland) Conny Kissling	(United Kingdom) Jilly Curry	(Switzerland) Maja Schmid
100	12	23 March 1991	(Sweden) Hundfjället	CO	(Switzerland) Conny Kissling	(United States) Kristean Porter	(United Kingdom) Jilly Curry

== Men's standings ==
=== Overall ===
Rank		Points
1	(France) Éric Laboureix	49
2	(France) Youri Gilg	47
3	(United States) Trace Worthington	45
4	(Canada) Jeff Viola	28
5	(Norway) Rune Kristiansen	25

- Standings after 50 races.

=== Moguls ===
Rank		Points
1	(France) Edgar Grospiron	192
2	(Norway) Hans Engelsen Eide	182
3	(France) Éric Berthon	180
4	(France) Olivier Allamand	177
5	(United States) Nelson Carmichael	176

- Standings after 12 races.

=== Aerials ===
Rank		Points
1	(Canada) Philippe LaRoche	210
2	(France) Didier Méda	206
3	(France) Jean-Marc Bacquin	202
4	(United States) Kris Feddersen	198
5	(United States) Trace Worthington	194

- Standings after 13 races.

=== Ballet ===
Rank		Points
1	(Norway) Rune Kristiansen	223
2	(United States) Lane Spina	213
3	(Canada) Dave Walker	201
4	(Italy) Roberto Franco	197
5	(Germany) Armin Weiss	191

- Standings after 13 races.

=== Combined ===
Rank		Points
1	(France) Éric Laboureix	117
2	(United States) Trace Worthington	115
3	(France) Youri Gilg	111
4	(Canada) Jeff Viola	99
5	(Spain) Rafael Herrero	82

- Standings after 12 races.

== Ladies' standings ==
=== Overall ===
Rank		Points
1	(Switzerland) Conny Kissling	26
2	(United Kingdom) Jilly Curry	14
3	(Switzerland) Maja Schmid	13
4	(United States) Donna Weinbrecht	12
5	(United States) Kristean Porter	12

- Standings after 50 races.

=== Moguls ===
Rank		Points
1	(United States) Donna Weinbrecht	95
2	(Norway) Stine Lise Hattestad	78
3	(Canada) LeeLee Morrison	75
4	(France) Raphaëlle Monod	72
5	(United States) Maggie Connor	60

- Standings after 12 races.

=== Aerials ===
Rank		Points
1	(Germany) Elfie Simchen	101
2	(Australia) Kirstie Marshall	97
3	(Switzerland) Colette Brand	81
4	(Norway) Hilde Synnøve Lid	77
5	(Sweden) Marie Lindgren	70

- Standings after 13 races.

=== Ballet ===
Rank		Points
1	(Switzerland) Conny Kissling	108
2	(United States) Jan Bucher	99
3	(United States) Ellen Breen	96
4	(France) Cathy Fechoz	85
5	(United Kingdom) Julia Snell	74

- Standings after 13 races.

=== Combined ===
Rank		Points
1	(Switzerland) Conny Kissling	64
2	(United Kingdom) Jilly Curry	55
3	(Switzerland) Maja Schmid	50
4	(United States) Kristean Porter	46
5	(Canada) Katherina Kubenk	42

- Standings after 12 races.
