= Freestyle skiing at the 1992 Winter Olympics – Men's moguls =

Men's moguls at the XVI Olympic Winter Games
- Venue: Tignes
- Dates: 12–13 February 1992
- Competitors: 47 from 17 nations
- Winning Score: 25.81

Medalists
| 1st place, gold medalist(s) | | Edgar Grospiron | France |
| 2nd place, silver medalist(s) | | Olivier Allamand | France |
| 3rd place, bronze medalist(s) | | Nelson Carmichael | United States |

The men's moguls event in freestyle skiing at the 1992 Winter Olympics in Albertville took place from 12 to 13 February at Tignes.

== Results ==
=== Qualification ===
The top 16 advanced to the final.

| Rank | Name | Country | Score | Notes |
|---|---|---|---|---|
| 1 | Edgar Grospiron | France | 25.23 | Q |
| 2 | Olivier Allamand | France | 24.96 | Q |
| 3 | Jean-Luc Brassard | Canada | 23.93 | Q |
| 4 | Nelson Carmichael | United States | 23.90 | Q |
| 5 | Youri Gilg | France | 23.63 | Q |
| 6 | John Smart | Canada | 23.48 | Q |
| 7 | Leif Persson | Sweden | 23.42 | Q |
| 8 | Éric Berthon | France | 23.41 | Q |
| 9 | Nick Cleaver | Australia | 23.25 | Q |
| 10 | Björn Åberg | Sweden | 23.10 | Q |
| 11 | Jürg Biner | Switzerland | 23.02 | Q |
| 12 | Jörgen Pääjärvi | Sweden | 22.98 | Q |
| 13 | Sergey Shupletsov | Unified Team | 22.65 | Q |
| 14 | Chuck Martin | United States | 22.59 | Q |
| 15 | Adrian Costa | Australia | 22.39 | Q |
| 16 | Craig Rodman | United States | 22.25 | Q |
| 17 | Thomas Lagler | Switzerland | 22.02 | |
| 18 | Janne Lahtela | Finland | 21.76 | |
| 19 | Klaus Weese | Germany | 21.63 | |
| 20 | Tero Turunen | Finland | 21.40 | |
| 21 | Andrey Ivanov | Unified Team | 21.24 | |
| 22 | Lane Barrett | Canada | 21.13 | |
| 23 | Bob Aldighieri | United States | 20.61 | |
| 24 | Simone Mottini | Italy | 19.92 | |
| 25 | Hugh Hutchison | Great Britain | 19.84 | |
| 26 | Neil Munro | Great Britain | 19.82 | |
| 27 | Christian Marcoux | Canada | 19.70 | |
| 28 | Aleksander Peternel | Slovenia | 18.70 | |
| 29 | Petsch Moser | Switzerland | 18.56 | |
| 30 | Ignacio Bustamante | Argentina | 18.18 | |
| 31 | Martí Herrero | Spain | 18.13 | |
| 32 | Michael Liebreich | Great Britain | 17.84 | |
| 33 | Aleksey Bannikov | Unified Team | 17.12 | |
| 34 | Normunds Aplociņš | Latvia | 17.03 | |
| 35 | Marko Jemec | Slovenia | 16.92 | |
| 36 | Mikhail Lyzhin | Unified Team | 16.04 | |
| 37 | Walter Osta | Italy | 15.81 | |
| 38 | Paolo Silvestri | Italy | 15.44 | |
| 39 | Bernard Brandt | Switzerland | 14.82 | |
| 40 | Osamu Yamazaki | Japan | 14.49 | |
| 41 | Petri Penttinen | Finland | 13.71 | |
| 42 | Dans Jansons | Latvia | 12.93 | |
| 43 | Giorgio Zini | Italy | 9.47 | |
| 44 | Simon Baynes | Great Britain | 7.86 | |
| 45 | José Rojas | Spain | 4.15 | |
| 46 | Luis González | Puerto Rico | 4.15 | |
| 47 | Jorge Torruellas | Puerto Rico | 4.00 | |

=== Final ===
| Rank | Name | Country | Score | Notes |
|---|---|---|---|---|
| 1st place, gold medalist(s) | Edgar Grospiron | France | 25.81 | |
| 2nd place, silver medalist(s) | Olivier Allamand | France | 24.87 | |
| 3rd place, bronze medalist(s) | Nelson Carmichael | United States | 24.82 | |
| 4 | Éric Berthon | France | 24.79 | |
| 5 | John Smart | Canada | 24.15 | |
| 6 | Jörgen Pääjärvi | Sweden | 24.14 | |
| 7 | Jean-Luc Brassard | Canada | 23.71 | |
| 8 | Leif Persson | Sweden | 22.99 | |
| 9 | Youri Gilg | France | 22.85 | |
| 10 | Jürg Biner | Switzerland | 22.69 | |
| 11 | Nick Cleaver | Australia | 22.04 | |
| 12 | Sergey Shupletsov | Unified Team | 21.60 | |
| 13 | Craig Rodman | United States | 21.18 | |
| 14 | Adrian Costa | Australia | 21.18 | |
| 15 | Chuck Martin | United States | 20.77 | |
| 16 | Björn Åberg | Sweden | 20.29 | |
