= Freestyle skiing at the 1998 Winter Olympics – Men's aerials =

Men's aerials at the XVIII Olympic Winter Games
- Venue: Iizuna Kogen Ski Area
- Dates: 18 February 1998
- Competitors: 25 from 14 nations
- Winning Score: 255.64

Medalists
1st place, gold medalist(s)		Eric Bergoust	United States
2nd place, silver medalist(s)		Sébastien Foucras	France
3rd place, bronze medalist(s)		Dmitry Dashchinsky	Belarus

The men's aerials event in freestyle skiing at the 1998 Winter Olympics in Nagano took place from 16 to 18 February at Iizuna Kogen Ski Area.

== Results ==
=== Qualification ===
The top 12 advanced to the final.

Rank	Name	Country	Jump 1	Jump 2	Total	Notes
1	Dmitry Dashchinsky	Belarus	118.66	130.38	249.04	Q
2	Britt Swartley	United States	126.60	120.48	247.08	Q
3	Aleksandr Mikhaylov	Russia	120.28	125.93	246.21	Q
4	Eric Bergoust	United States	121.04	111.57	232.61	Q
5	Andy Capicik	Canada	116.59	110.80	227.39	Q
6	Stanislav Kravchuk	Ukraine	113.05	113.60	226.65	Q
7	Jeff Bean	Canada	111.17	113.69	224.86	Q
8	Nicolas Fontaine	Canada	113.25	106.35	219.60	Q
9	Aleksey Grishin	Belarus	108.49	109.35	217.84	Q
10	Christian Rijavec	Austria	97.90	114.61	212.51	Q
11	Aleš Valenta	Czech Republic	88.69	116.81	205.50	Q
12	Sébastien Foucras	France	111.02	89.25	200.27	Q
13	Vasily Vorobyov	Belarus	113.03	86.26	199.29	
14	Freddy Romano	Italy	90.12	105.26	195.38	
15	Mariano Ferrario	United States	111.17	75.81	186.98	
16	Jean-Damien Climonet	France	84.55	102.26	186.81	
17	Ou Xiaotao	China	79.97	103.87	183.84	
18	Aleksandr Tkachenko	Belarus	88.35	90.11	178.46	
19	Yuriy Stetsko	Ukraine	89.46	82.00	171.46	
20	Kevin Harbut	Great Britain	82.46	85.86	168.32	
21	Matt Chojnacki	United States	81.65	83.43	165.08	
22	Miha Gale	Slovenia	102.03	52.65	154.68	
23	Kazuaki Ando	Japan	46.77	88.35	135.12	
24	Serhiy But	Ukraine	65.25	45.36	110.61	
-	Jonathan Sweet	Australia	DNF	-	-	

=== Final ===
Rank	Name	Country	Jump 1	Jump 2	Total	Notes
1st place, gold medalist(s)	Eric Bergoust	United States	133.05	122.59	255.64	
2nd place, silver medalist(s)	Sébastien Foucras	France	126.15	122.64	248.79	
3rd place, bronze medalist(s)	Dmitry Dashchinsky	Belarus	118.86	121.93	240.79	
4	Aleš Valenta	Czech Republic	115.22	117.03	232.25	
5	Britt Swartley	United States	121.70	109.91	231.61	
6	Aleksandr Mikhaylov	Russia	111.17	118.81	229.98	
7	Christian Rijavec	Austria	112.79	114.81	227.60	
8	Aleksey Grishin	Belarus	100.84	120.15	220.99	
9	Stanislav Kravchuk	Ukraine	107.35	112.59	219.94	
10	Nicolas Fontaine	Canada	123.71	93.22	216.93	
11	Jeff Bean	Canada	118.66	92.11	210.77	
12	Andy Capicik	Canada	90.55	118.46	209.01	
