= Freestyle skiing at the 1998 Winter Olympics – Men's moguls =

Men's moguls at the XVIII Olympic Winter Games
- Venue: Iizuna Kogen Ski Area
- Dates: 8–11 February 1998
- Competitors: 33 from 13 nations
- Winning Score: 26.93

Medalists
1st place, gold medalist(s)		Jonny Moseley	United States
2nd place, silver medalist(s)		Janne Lahtela	Finland
3rd place, bronze medalist(s)		Sami Mustonen	Finland

The men's moguls event in freestyle skiing at the 1998 Winter Olympics in Nagano took place from 8 to 11 February at Iizuna Kogen Ski Area.

== Results ==
=== Qualification ===
The top 16 advanced to the final.

Rank	Name	Country	Score	Notes
1	Jonny Moseley	United States	26.53	Q
2	Janne Lahtela	Finland	25.43	Q
3	Sami Mustonen	Finland	25.16	Q
4	Kurre Lansburgh	Sweden	25.14	Q
5	Ryan Johnson	Canada	25.12	Q
6	Thony Hemery	France	25.06	Q
7	Jean-Luc Brassard	Canada	24.73	Q
8	Stéphane Rochon	Canada	24.62	Q
9	Lauri Lassila	Finland	24.53	Q
10	Alexander Wilson	United States	24.32	Q
11	Fabrice Ougier	France	24.26	Q
12	Julien Regnier-Lafforgue	France	24.2	Q
13	Patrik Sundberg	Sweden	24.19	Q
14	Jesper Rönnbäck	Sweden	24.16	Q
15	Gota Miura	Japan	24.14	Q
16	Daigo Hara	Japan	24.04	Q
17	Dominick Gauthier	Canada	23.9	
18	Yugo Tsukita	Japan	23.81	
19	Armen Rafayelyan	Armenia	23.49	
20	Olivier Cotte	France	23.46	
21	Adrian Costa	Australia	23.45	
22	Roger Hållander	Sweden	23.35	
23	Jim Moran	United States	22.90	
24	Yevgeny Sennikov	Russia	22.76	
25	Richard Ussher	New Zealand	20.75	
26	Aleksey Bannikov	Kazakhstan	20.18	
27	Andrey Ivanov	Russia	18.73	
28	Tim Dudgeon	Great Britain	16.32	
29	Oleg Kuleshov	Belarus	11.13	
30	Takehiro Sakamoto	Japan	8.68	
31	Evan Dybvig	United States	4.55	
-	Vitaly Glushchenko	Russia	DNF	
-	Sam Temple	Great Britain	DNF	

=== Final ===
Rank	Name	Country	Score	Notes
1st place, gold medalist(s)	Jonny Moseley	United States	26.93	
2nd place, silver medalist(s)	Janne Lahtela	Finland	26.00	
3rd place, bronze medalist(s)	Sami Mustonen	Finland	25.76	
4	Jean-Luc Brassard	Canada	25.52	
5	Lauri Lassila	Finland	25.43	
6	Jesper Rönnbäck	Sweden	25.32	
7	Ryan Johnson	Canada	25.25	
8	Stéphane Rochon	Canada	25.01	
9	Kurre Lansburgh	Sweden	24.71	
10	Alexander Wilson	United States	24.68	
11	Julien Regnier-Lafforgue	France	24.64	
12	Fabrice Ougier	France	24.22	
13	Gota Miura	Japan	23.06	
14	Patrik Sundberg	Sweden	23.00	
15	Daigo Hara	Japan	12.13	
-	Thony Hemery	France	DNF	
