= Neil Munro =

Neil Munro is the name of:

- Neil Munro (actor) (1947–2009), Scottish-born Canadian director, actor and playwright
- Neil Munro (journalist), political journalist
- Neil Munro (skier) (born 1967), British Olympic skier
- Neil Munro (writer) (1863–1930), Scottish journalist, newspaper editor, author and literary critic
- Neil Gordon Munro (1863–1942), Scottish physician and anthropologist, resident in Japan for almost fifty years
- Neil Munro (footballer) (1868–1948), Scottish footballer who played for Abercorn and Scotland

== See also ==
- John Neil Munro, author of The Sensational Alex Harvey and Some People Are Crazy — The John Martyn Story
- Neil Munro Roger, see Bunny Roger
