= FIS Freestyle World Ski Championships 1995 =

Ski competition held in France

The 1995 FIS Freestyle World Ski Championships were held between February 6th and February 9th at the La Clusaz ski resort in France. The World Championships featured both men's and women's events in the Moguls, Aerials, Acro Skiing and the Combined.

== Results ==
=== Men's results ===
==== Moguls ====
Medal	Name	Nation	Result
1st place, gold medalist(s)	Edgar Grospiron	France	27.14
2nd place, silver medalist(s)	Jean-Luc Brassard	Canada	26.35
3rd place, bronze medalist(s)	Sergei Shupletsov	Russia	26.19

==== Aerials ====
Medal	Name	Nation	Result
1st place, gold medalist(s)	Trace Worthington	United States	243.09
2nd place, silver medalist(s)	Christian Rijavec	Austria	241.34
3rd place, bronze medalist(s)	Sébastien Foucras	France	239.38

==== Acro Skiing ====
Medal	Name	Nation	Result
1st place, gold medalist(s)	Rune Kristiansen	Norway	25.75
2nd place, silver medalist(s)	Fabrice Becker	France	25.10
3rd place, bronze medalist(s)	Heini Baumgartner	Switzerland	24.25

==== Combined ====
Medal	Name	Nation	Result
1st place, gold medalist(s)	Trace Worthington	United States	27.98
2nd place, silver medalist(s)	Darcy Downs	Canada	27.51
3rd place, bronze medalist(s)	Jonny Moseley	United States	25.39

=== Women's results ===
==== Moguls ====
Medal	Name	Nation	Result
1st place, gold medalist(s)	Candice Gilg	France	25.52
2nd place, silver medalist(s)	Raphaelle Monod	France	24.89
3rd place, bronze medalist(s)	Tatjana Mittermayer	Germany	24.62

==== Aerials ====
Medal	Name	Nation	Result
1st place, gold medalist(s)	Nikki Stone	United States	176.53
2nd place, silver medalist(s)	Marie Lindgren	Sweden	169.53
3rd place, bronze medalist(s)	Kirstie Marshall	Australia	168.08

==== Acro Skiing ====
Medal	Name	Nation	Result
1st place, gold medalist(s)	Elena Batalova	Russia	28.64
2nd place, silver medalist(s)	Ellen Breen	United States	26.44
3rd place, bronze medalist(s)	Annika Johansson	Sweden	25.05

==== Combined ====
Medal	Name	Nation	Result
1st place, gold medalist(s)	Kristean Porter	United States	28.67
2nd place, silver medalist(s)	Maja Schmid	Switzerland	26.03
3rd place, bronze medalist(s)	Katherina Kubenk	Canada	25.41

== Medal table ==
Rank	Nation	Gold	Silver	Bronze	Total
1	United States	4	1	1	6
2	France	2	2	1	5
3	Russia	1	0	1	2
4	Norway	1	0	0	1
5	Canada	0	2	1	3
6	Sweden	0	1	1	2
6	Switzerland	0	1	1	2
8	Austria	0	1	0	1
9	Australia	0	0	1	1
9	Germany	0	0	1	1
Totals (10 entries)		8	8	8	24
