= Fabrice Becker =

French freestyle skier (born 1971)

Personal information
- Nationality: France
- Born: 28 June 1971 (age 55) Strasbourg, France
- Height: 1.83 m (6 ft 0 in)

Sport
- Sport: Skiing

World Cup career
- Seasons: 10 – (1989–1998)
- Indiv. podiums: 47
- Indiv. wins: 21
- Overall titles: 1 – (1998)
- Discipline titles: 3 – (3 AC: 1994, 1997, 1998)
Medal record
Freestyle skiing
Representing France
World Championships
Gold medal – first place	1993 Altenmarkt	Ski ballet
Gold medal – first place	1997 Nagano	Ski ballet
Silver medal – second place	1995 La Clusaz	Ski ballet

Fabrice Becker (born 28 June 1971) is a French former freestyle skier. He specialized in ski ballet and won the demonstrational Olympic event in this now-defunct discipline at the 1992 Winter Olympics. He is a two-time ski ballet World Champion, winning the title in 1993 and 1997 and also earned an additional silver medal at the 1995 World Championships. In his last season as a competitive skier, Becker crowned as the overall World Cup Champion and became the first and only ski ballet specialist to win the general classification at the FIS Freestyle Ski World Cup. He celebrated a total of 21 victories in his World Cup career and won the ski ballet Crystal Globe three times.

== Freestyle skiing results ==
All results are sourced from the International Ski Federation (FIS).

=== World Championships ===
- 3 medals – (2 gold, 1 silver)

Year	Age	Ski ballet
(United States) 1991 Lake Placid	19	7
(Austria) 1993 Altenmarkt	21	1
(France) 1995 La Clusaz	23	2
(Japan) 1997 Nagano	25	1

=== World Cup standings ===
Season	Age	Overall	Ski ballet	Aerials
1988–89	17	122	39	–
1989–90	18	55	19	–
1990–91	19	23	8	–
1991–92	20	7	2	–
1992–93	21	4	2	–
1993–94	22	5	1	–
1994–95	23	5	2	36
1995–96	24	competed only 1 aerials event, no points score		
1996–97	25	2	1	36
1997–98	26	1	1	37
