= Aleksandr Tkachenko (skier) =

Belarusian freestyle skier

Personal information
- Nationality: Belarusian
- Born: 13 February 1971 (age 54)

Sport
- Sport: Freestyle skiing

Aleksandr Tkachenko (born 13 February 1971) is a Belarusian freestyle skier. He competed in the men's aerials event at the 1998 Winter Olympics.
