= Mikhail Lyzhin =

Russian freestyle skier

Personal information
- Nationality: Russian
- Born: 9 August 1973 (age 51)

Sport
- Sport: Freestyle skiing

Mikhail Lyzhin (born 9 August 1973) is a Russian freestyle skier. He competed in the men's moguls event at the 1992 Winter Olympics.
