= Craig Rodman =

American skier

Craig Rodman (born 4 October 1972) is a retired American skier who competed at two Winter Olympics.

== 1992 Winter Olympics ==
Rodman made the finals of the men's moguls at the 1992 Winter Olympics where he finished 13th. Rodman earned the last qualifying spot in the finals by finishing 16th in the qualification round. He was injured after the Olympics.

== 1994 Winter Olympics ==
Rodman missed the finals of the men's moguls at the 1992 Winter Olympics by 2 places and .33 points, where he finished 18th.

== Post-Olympic skiing career ==
Rodman won a world cup event at La Clusaz, France during the 1995-96 season.

== Post-skiing career ==
Rodman became an announcer.
