= Bob Aldighieri =

American freestyle skier

Personal information
- Full name: Robert Mathew Aldighieri
- Nationality: American
- Born: March 20, 1965 (age 61) Teaneck, New Jersey, U.S.

Sport
- Country: United States
- Sport: Freestyle skiing

Robert Mathew Aldighieri (born March 20, 1965) is an American freestyle skier. He competed in the men's moguls event at the 1992 Winter Olympics. He attended Castleton State College.
