= Oleg Kuleshov (skier) =

Belarusian freestyle skier

Personal information
- Nationality: Belarusian
- Born: 20 August 1976 (age 48); Minsk, Belarus

Sport
- Sport: Freestyle skiing

Oleg Kuleshov (born 20 August 1976) is a Belarusian freestyle skier. He competed in the men's moguls event at the 1998 Winter Olympics.
