= Armen Rafayelyan =

Armenian freestyle skier

Personal information
- Nationality: Armenian
- Born: 10 February 1978 (age 47); Yerevan, Armenia

Sport
- Sport: Freestyle skiing

Armen Rafayelyan (born 10 February 1978) is an Armenian freestyle skier. He competed in the men's moguls event at the 1998 Winter Olympics.
