= Ignacio Bustamante =

Argentine freestyle skier (born 1965)

Personal information
- Born: 30 August 1965 (age 59); Bariloche, Argentina

Sport
- Sport: Freestyle skiing

Ignacio Bustamante (born 30 August 1965) is an Argentine freestyle skier. He competed in the men's moguls event at the 1992 Winter Olympics.
