= Giorgio Zini =

Italian freestyle skier

Personal information
- Nationality: Italian
- Born: 11 August 1967 (age 58) Livigno, Italy

Sport
- Sport: Freestyle skiing

Giorgio Zini (born 11 August 1967) is an Italian freestyle skier. He competed in the men's moguls event at the 1992 Winter Olympics.
