= Tero Turunen =

Finnish freestyle skier

Personal information
- Nationality: Finnish
- Born: 13 September 1967 (age 57); Kuopio, Finland

Sport
- Sport: Freestyle skiing

Tero Turunen (born 13 September 1967) is a Finnish freestyle skier. He competed in the men's moguls event at the 1992 Winter Olympics.
