= Kazuaki Ando =

Japanese freestyle skier (born 1967)

Personal information
- Nationality: Japanese
- Born: 5 February 1967 (age 58); Tokyo, Japan

Sport
- Sport: Freestyle skiing

Kazuaki Ando (安藤 和明, Andō Kazuaki, born 5 February 1967) is a Japanese freestyle skier. He competed in the men's aerials event at the 1998 Winter Olympics.
