= Jim Moran (skier) =

American freestyle skier (born 1972)

Personal information
- Nationality: American
- Born: April 17, 1972 (age 54) Pompton Plains, New Jersey, United States

Sport
- Sport: Freestyle skiing

Jim Moran (born April 17, 1972) is an American freestyle skier. He competed in the men's moguls event at the 1998 Winter Olympics, X games, and Big Mountain World tour. Jim was a star skier in multiple Greg Stump, Warren Miller, RAP production, and Scott Gaffney ski films. Star Stunt double for TJ in the movie “Aspen Extreme.”

Moran and Stacy Bloomer sued the National governing body of skiing (USSSA) in conjunction with the United States Olympic Committee in 1998. The suit was over limiting athletes ability to compete in the Olympic Games in setting new criteria. They won their case using the core philosophy of the Olympic Games.

Baron Pierre de Coubertin, who said "The most important thing in the Olympic Games is not winning but taking part; the essential thing in life is not conquering but fighting well."

The United States Olympic Committee, and United States Ski & Snowboard Association were ordered to fill all of the Olympic Quota spots.

Jim Moran, Stacey Bloomer, and Evan Dydvig were named to the 1998 Winter Olympic Team. The alpine team criteria was also terminated. Jim left the National team immediately following the Olympic Games.

Jim placed 5th overall on the Big Mountain World tour in 1999. However, Jim also suffered a career ending TBI at the US Open Freeskiing event in Vail, Colorado.

Jim has recovered from his injury, and attained a BS in Behavioral Science and Health from the University of Utah.

== Biography ==
Moran was born in 1972 in the Pompton Plains section of Pequannock Township, New Jersey. He was part of the American freestyle ski team for most of the 1990s. At the FIS Freestyle Ski World Cup, Moran was a two-time mogul champion, winning the event at the 1992–93 FIS Freestyle Ski World Cup and the 1995–96 FIS Freestyle Ski World Cup.

Originally he was not selected to compete at the 1998 Winter Olympics. However, following a successful petition to the United States Olympic & Paralympic Committee and arbitration hearing, he was granted a spot on the US team. Despite the US team being able to select up to fourteen skiers for the Olympics, only eleven where initially selected. At the 1998 Winter Olympics in Nagano, Moran represented the United States on World Cup in the men's moguls event, in 1997 Jim was ranked 5th in the World on FIS grand pre points list.

In February 1999, Moran suffered a TBI during a skiing competition, suffering a head injury. Despite being in a coma for almost a month, and suffering with partial paralysis, he made a fully recovery. However, the injury forced him to retire from the sport.

In 2008, Moran gained a degree with the University of Utah, and later moved to Salt Lake City.
