= Yevgeny Sennikov =

Russian freestyle skier

Personal information
- Nationality: Russian
- Born: 6 November 1974 (age 50); Tomsk, Russia

Sport
- Sport: Freestyle skiing

Yevgeny Sennikov (born 6 November 1974) is a Russian freestyle skier. He competed in the men's moguls event at the 1998 Winter Olympics.
