= Petri Penttinen =

Finnish freestyle skier

Personal information
- Nationality: Finnish
- Born: 24 September 1965 (age 59); Helsinki, Finland

Sport
- Sport: Freestyle skiing

Petri Penttinen (born 24 September 1965) is a Finnish freestyle skier. He competed in the men's moguls event at the 1992 Winter Olympics.

Petri Penttinen was 8th in World Championships in moguls in 1991 in Lake Placid, USA He is also 2 time Finnish champion in mogul-skiing. Best result in WC was 6th in Nagano, Japan
