= Kevin Harbut =

British freestyle skier

Personal information
- Nationality: British
- Born: 24 April 1971 (age 53); Southampton, England

Sport
- Sport: Freestyle skiing

Kevin Harbut (born 24 April 1971) is a British freestyle skier. He competed in the men's aerials event at the 1998 Winter Olympics.
