= FIS Freestyle World Ski Championships 1997 =

The 1997 FIS Freestyle World Ski Championships were held between February 6 and February 9 at the Iizuna Kogen Ski Area in Japan. The World Championships featured both men's and women's events in the Moguls, Aerials, and Acro Skiing, and a men's Combined event. This was a test event for the freestyle skiing events that would take place at the Winter Olympics near Nagano the following year.

== Results ==
=== Men's results ===
==== Moguls ====
Medal	Name	Nation	Result
1st place, gold medalist(s)	Jean-Luc Brassard	Canada	27.52
2nd place, silver medalist(s)	Stephane Rochon	Canada	26.00
3rd place, bronze medalist(s)	Jesper Roennback	Sweden	25.43

==== Aerials ====
Medal	Name	Nation	Result
1st place, gold medalist(s)	Nicolas Fontaine	Canada	254.97
2nd place, silver medalist(s)	Eric Bergoust	United States	245.63
3rd place, bronze medalist(s)	Andy Capicik	Canada	235.38

==== Acro Skiing ====
Medal	Name	Nation	Result
1st place, gold medalist(s)	Fabrice Becker	France	26.89
2nd place, silver medalist(s)	Ian Edmondson	United States	26.39
3rd place, bronze medalist(s)	Heini Baumgartner	Switzerland	25.39

==== Combined ====
Medal	Name	Nation	Result
1st place, gold medalist(s)	Darcy Downs	Canada	30.00
2nd place, silver medalist(s)	Toben Sutherland	Canada	27.60
3rd place, bronze medalist(s)	Oleg Kouleshov	Belarus	24.00

=== Women's results ===
==== Moguls ====
Medal	Name	Nation	Result
1st place, gold medalist(s)	Candice Gilg	France	24.84
2nd place, silver medalist(s)	Donna Weinbrecht	United States	24.60
3rd place, bronze medalist(s)	Tatjana Mittermayer	Germany	24.19

==== Aerials ====
Medal	Name	Nation	Result
1st place, gold medalist(s)	Kirstie Marshall	Australia	197.91
2nd place, silver medalist(s)	Michele Rohrbach	Switzerland	177.84
3rd place, bronze medalist(s)	Veronica Brenner	Canada	176.78

==== Acro Skiing ====
Medal	Name	Nation	Result
1st place, gold medalist(s)	Oksana Kushenko	Russia	25.80
2nd place, silver medalist(s)	Aasa Magnusson	Sweden	25.25
3rd place, bronze medalist(s)	Annika Johansson	Sweden	25.25
