= Roger Hållander =

Swedish freestyle skier

Personal information
- Nationality: Swedish
- Born: 26 March 1975 (age 50); Själevad, Sweden

Sport
- Sport: Freestyle skiing

Roger Hållander (born 26 March 1975) is a Swedish freestyle skier. He competed in the men's moguls event at the 1998 Winter Olympics.
