= Tim Dudgeon =

British freestyle skier

Personal information
- Nationality: British
- Born: 17 July 1968 (age 56); Canterbury, England

Sport
- Sport: Freestyle skiing

Tim Dudgeon (born 17 July 1968) is a British freestyle skier. He competed in the men's moguls event at the 1998 Winter Olympics.
