= Simon Baynes (skier) =

British freestyle skier

Personal information
- Nationality: British
- Born: 1 October 1963 (age 61); Farnborough, England

Sport
- Sport: Freestyle skiing

Simon Baynes (born 1 October 1963) is a British freestyle skier. He competed in the men's moguls event at the 1992 Winter Olympics.
