= Lane Barrett =

Canadian freestyle skier

Personal information
- Born: 17 October 1964 (age 61) Calgary, Alberta, Canada

Sport
- Sport: Freestyle skiing

Lane Barrett (born 17 October 1964) is a Canadian freestyle skier. He competed in the men's moguls event at the 1992 Winter Olympics.
