= Daigo Hara =

Japanese freestyle skier (born 1974)

Personal information
- Nationality: Japanese
- Born: 24 December 1974 (age 50); Sapporo, Japan

Sport
- Sport: Freestyle skiing

Daigo Hara (原 大虎, Hara Daigo, born 24 December 1974) is a Japanese freestyle skier. He competed in the men's moguls event at the 1998 Winter Olympics.
