= Paolo Silvestri =

Italian freestyle skier

Personal information
- Nationality: Italian
- Born: 23 January 1967 (age 59) Livigno, Italy

Sport
- Sport: Freestyle skiing

Paolo Silvestri (born 23 January 1967) is an Italian freestyle skier. He competed in the men's moguls event at the 1992 Winter Olympics.
