= Julien Regnier-Lafforgue =

French freestyle skier (born 1979)

Personal information
- Nationality: French
- Born: 15 January 1979 (age 47) Chambéry, France

Sport
- Sport: Freestyle skiing

Julien Regnier-Lafforgue (born 15 February 1979) is a French freestyle skier. He competed in the men's moguls event at the 1998 Winter Olympics.
