= Sam Temple =

British freestyle skier

Personal information
- Nationality: British
- Born: 25 January 1972 (age 54) Oxford, England

Sport
- Sport: Freestyle skiing

Sam Temple (born 25 January 1972) is a British freestyle skier. He competed at the 1998 Winter Olympics and the 2002 Winter Olympics.
