= Freestyle skiing at the 1998 Winter Olympics =

Freestyle skiing at the XVIII Olympic Winter Games
- Venue: Iizuna Kogen Ski Area
- Dates: 8–18 February
- Competitors: 110 from 25 nations

The freestyle skiing competition of the 1998 Winter Olympics was held at Iizuna Kogen Ski Area. There were four events, taking place between 8 and 18 February 1998.

== Medal summary ==
=== Medal table ===
Rank	Nation	Gold	Silver	Bronze	Total
1	United States	3	0	0	3
2	Japan	1	0	0	1
3	Finland	0	1	1	2
4	China	0	1	0	1
4	France	0	1	0	1
4	Germany	0	1	0	1
7	Belarus	0	0	1	1
7	Norway	0	0	1	1
7	Switzerland	0	0	1	1
Totals (9 entries)		4	4	4	12

=== Men's Events ===
Event	Gold		Silver		Bronze	
Moguls	Jonny Moseley; United States	26.93	Janne Lahtela; Finland	26.00	Sami Mustonen; Finland	25.76
Aerials	Eric Bergoust; United States	255.64	Sébastien Foucras; France	248.79	Dmitry Dashchinsky; Belarus	240.79

=== Women's Events ===
Event	Gold		Silver		Bronze	
Moguls	Tae Satoya; Japan	25.06	Tatjana Mittermayer; Germany	24.62	Kari Traa; Norway	24.09
Aerials	Nikki Stone; United States	193.00	Xu Nannan; China	186.97	Colette Brand; Switzerland	171.83

== Participating NOCs ==
Twenty-five nations participated in freestyle skiing at Nagano. Armenia, the Czech Republic, Denmark, New Zealand and Portugal made their debuts in the sport.

- Armenia (1)
- Australia (5)
- Austria (2)
- Belarus (6)
- Canada (12)
- China (5)
- Czech Republic (1)
- Denmark (1)
- Finland (4)
- France (7)
- Great Britain (3)
- Germany (3)
- Italy (2)
- Japan (7)
- Kazakhstan (2)
- Norway (2)
- New Zealand (2)
- Portugal (1)
- Russia (9)
- Slovenia (1)
- Sweden (8)
- Switzerland (4)
- Ukraine (7)
- United States (14)
- Uzbekistan (1)
