= Christian Marcoux =

Canadian freestyle skier

Personal information
- Born: 4 April 1969 (age 55); Quebec City, Quebec, Canada

Sport
- Sport: Freestyle skiing

Christian Marcoux (born 4 April 1969) is a Canadian freestyle skier. He competed in the men's moguls event at the 1992 Winter Olympics.
