= José Rojas (skier) =

Spanish freestyle skier (born 1970)

Personal information
- Nationality: Spanish
- Born: 23 June 1970 (age 55) Granada, Spain

Sport
- Sport: Freestyle skiing

José Rojas (born 23 June 1970) is a Spanish freestyle skier. He competed at the 1992 Winter Olympics and the 1994 Winter Olympics.
