= Simone Mottini =

Italian freestyle skier

Personal information
- Nationality: Italian
- Born: 23 March 1970 (age 55) Livigno, Italy

Sport
- Sport: Freestyle skiing

Simone Mottini (born 23 March 1970) is an Italian freestyle skier. He competed at the 1992 Winter Olympics and the 1994 Winter Olympics.
