= Björn Åberg =

Swedish freestyle skier (born 1968)

Personal information
- Nationality: Swedish
- Born: 15 April 1968 (age 56); Östersund, Sweden
- Height: 1.81 m (5 ft 11 in)
- Weight: 76 kg (168 lb)

Sport
- Sport: Freestyle skiing

Björn Olof Conny Åberg (born 15 April 1968) is a Swedish freestyle skier. He competed in the 1992 Winter Olympics.
