= Martí Herrero =

Spanish freestyle skier

Personal information
- Nationality: Spanish
- Born: 14 August 1964 (age 60); Barcelona, Spain

Sport
- Sport: Freestyle skiing

Martí Herrero (born 14 August 1964) is a Spanish freestyle skier. He competed in the men's moguls event at the 1992 Winter Olympics.
