= Walter Osta =

Italian freestyle skier

Personal information
- Nationality: Italian
- Born: 9 August 1970 (age 54); Pieve di Cadore, Italy

Sport
- Sport: Freestyle skiing

Walter Osta (born 9 August 1970) is an Italian freestyle skier. He competed at the 1992 Winter Olympics and the 1994 Winter Olympics.
