= Takehiro Sakamoto =

Japanese freestyle skier (born 1976)

Personal information
- Nationality: Japanese
- Born: 16 November 1976 (age 48); Sapporo, Japan

Sport
- Sport: Freestyle skiing

Takehiro Sakamoto (坂本 豪大, Sakamoto Takehiro, born 16 November 1976) is a Japanese freestyle skier. He competed in the men's moguls event at the 1998 Winter Olympics.
