= Neil Munro (skier) =

British freestyle skier

Personal information
- Nationality: British
- Born: 23 September 1967 (age 57)

Sport
- Sport: Freestyle skiing

Neil Munro (born 23 September 1967) is a British freestyle skier. He competed in the men's moguls event at the 1992 Winter Olympics.
