= Kurre Lansburgh =

Swedish freestyle skier

Personal information
- Nationality: Swedish
- Born: 28 May 1977 (age 47); Uppsala, Sweden

Sport
- Sport: Freestyle skiing

Kurre Lansburgh (born 28 May 1977) is a Swedish freestyle skier. He competed in the men's moguls event at the 1998 Winter Olympics.
