= Maggie Connor =

American freestyle skier

Personal information
- Nationality: American
- Born: September 1, 1963 (age 63) Salem, Massachusetts, United States

Sport
- Sport: Freestyle skiing

Maggie Connor (born September 1, 1963) is an American freestyle skier. Active between 1988-1998, she competed in the women's moguls event at the 1992 Winter Olympics. She was later World Professional moguls champion in 1994 and 1995.

After retiring, she studied neurolinguistics and hypnotherapy and became a life coach, founding her own business called Ultimate Journey. She later donated most of her trophies and medals to the Special Olympics.
