= Aleksandr Mikhaylov (skier) =

Russian freestyle skier

Personal information
- Nationality: Russian
- Born: 6 November 1970 (age 54); Volgograd, Russia

Sport
- Sport: Freestyle skiing

Aleksandr Mikhaylov (born 6 November 1970) is a Russian freestyle skier. He competed at the 1998 Winter Olympics and the 2002 Winter Olympics.
