= Kylie Gill =

New Zealand skier

Kylie Jane Gill (born 8 January 1974) is an Australian-born competitive skier from New Zealand. In 1998 she represented New Zealand in freestyle skiing at the Winter Olympics in Nagano, Japan.

Gill was born in Sydney, Australia, in 1974 and first started skiing at the age of four. When she was 10 years old she began freestyle skiing training at Thredbo, and when she was 14 she started competing internationally. Days before her appearance at the 1998 Nagano Olympics in Japan, she fractured her back and skied in her events with a back brace, plaster casts on her shins, knee braces and shoulder taping. Her injury was severe, however, and she retired from skiing.

Gill moved into sports management and administration, working with the Organising Committee for the 2000 Sydney Olympics. She later founded a consultancy business to assist retiring elite athletes to transition to a new career.
