= Jesper Rönnbäck =

Swedish freestyle skier (born 1974)

Personal information
- Nationality: Swedish
- Born: 1 February 1974 (age 51); Jukkasjärvi, Sweden

Sport
- Sport: Freestyle skiing

Jesper Rönnbäck (born 1 February 1974) is a Swedish freestyle skier. He competed in the men's moguls event at the 1998 Winter Olympics.
