= Lyudmila Dymchenko =

Russian freestyle skier

Personal information
- Born: 3 March 1977 (age 48); Moscow, Russian SFSR, Soviet Union

Sport
- Country: Russia
- Sport: Freestyle skiing

Lyudmila Dymchenko (born 3 March 1977) is a Russian freestyle skier. She was born in Moscow. She competed at the 1994, 1998, 2002 and 2006 Winter Olympics.
