= Fabrice Ougier =

French freestyle skier

Personal information
- Nationality: French
- Born: 26 July 1971 (age 53); Chambéry, France

Sport
- Sport: Freestyle skiing

Fabrice Ougier (born 26 July 1971) is a French freestyle skier. He competed in the men's moguls event at the 1998 Winter Olympics.
