= Jean-Damien Climonet =

French freestyle skier (born 1969)

Personal information
- Nationality: French
- Citizenship: France
- Born: 27 March 1969 (age 55); Lons-le-Saunier, France
- Height: 5 ft 6 in (168 cm)
- Weight: 143 lb (65 kg)

Sport
- Country: France
- Sport: Freestyle skiing
- Event: Men's Freestyle Aerials
- Team: France Ski Team
- Retired: 1998

Achievements and titles
- Olympic finals: Nagano 1998

Jean-Damien Climonet (born 27 March 1969) is retired French freestyle skier who competed in the 1998 Winter Olympics in Nagano. The best result at the World Cup has reached championship in Iizuna, where he finished 6th in acrobatic jumps. He also finished in 16th place in the same event in Olympic Games in Nagano. In his best performance in the world cup, he reached 1996/1997 season, when he reached in 12th place in the general classification and the classification of acrobatic jumps was second. In 1998 he ended his skiing career.
