= Minna Karhu =

Finnish freestyle skier

Personal information
- Nationality: Finnish
- Born: 2 November 1971 (age 55) Vantaa, Finland

Sport
- Country: Finland
- Sport: Freestyle skiing

Minna Karhu (born 2 November 1971) is a Finnish freestyle skier. She was born in Vantaa. She competed at the 1992 Winter Olympics, at the 1994 Winter Olympics in Lillehammer, and at the 1998 and 2002 Winter Olympics. Her best Olympic achievement was sixth place in women's moguls in Nagano in 1998.
