= Yelizaveta Kozhevnikova =

Russian freestyle skier (born 1973)

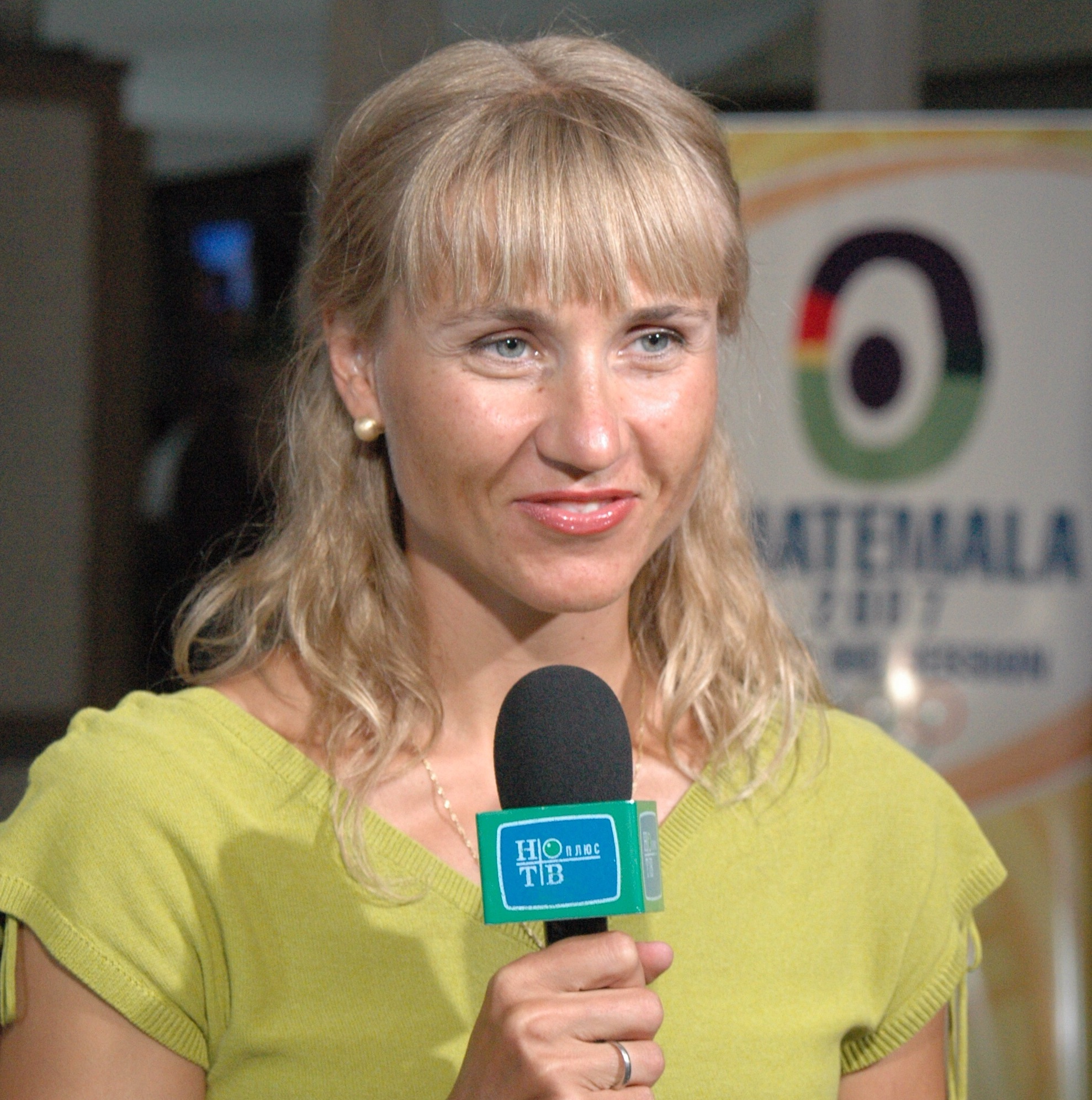

Personal information
- Nationality: Russian
- Born: 27 December 1973 (age 52) Moscow

Sport
- Sport: Freestyle skiing
Medal record
Women's freestyle skiing
Olympic Games
Representing Unified Team
Silver medal – second place	1992 Albertville	Moguls
Representing Russia
Bronze medal – third place	1994 Lillehammer	Moguls

Yelizaveta Aleksandrovna Kozhevnikova (Russian: Елизаве́та Алекса́ндровна Коже́вникова; born 27 December 1973 in Moscow) is a Russian freestyle skier and Olympic medalist.

== Career ==
Kozhevnikova competed for the Unified Team and received a silver medal at the 1992 Winter Olympics in Albertville, in moguls.

She won the bronze medal at the 1994 Winter Olympics in Lillehammer.
