= Michèle Rohrbach =

Swiss freestyle skier

Personal information
- Born: 28 December 1974 (age 51)

Sport
- Country: Switzerland
- Sport: Freestyle skiing
Medal record
Women's freestyle skiing
Representing Switzerland
World Championships
Silver medal – second place	1997 Nagano	Aerials
Silver medal – second place	2001 Whistler-Blackcomb	Aerials

Michèle Rohrbach (born 28 December 1974) is a Swiss freestyle skier. She competed at the 1998 Winter Olympics in Nagano, where she placed eleventh in women's aerials.
