= Aleksey Bannikov =

Kazakhstani freestyle skier (born 1973)

Personal information
- Nationality: Kazakhstani
- Born: 26 September 1973 (age 51); Alma-Ata, Kazakh SSR, Soviet Union

Sport
- Sport: Freestyle skiing

Aleksey Bannikov (born 26 September 1973) is a Kazakhstani freestyle skier. He competed at the 1992, 1994, 1998, and the 2002 Winter Olympics.
