= Mariano Ferrario =

American freestyle skier

Personal information
- Nationality: American
- Born: January 16, 1974 (age 52) Chesterland, Ohio, United States

Sport
- Sport: Freestyle skiing

Mariano Ferrario (born January 16, 1974) is an American freestyle skier. He competed in the men's aerials event at the 1998 Winter Olympics.
