= Kristean Porter =

American freestyle skier

Personal information
- Born: 3 September 1971 (age 54) Biloxi, Mississippi, United States

Sport
- Country: United States
- Sport: Freestyle skiing
Medal record
Women's freestyle skiing
Representing United States
World Championships
Gold medal – first place	1995 La Clusaz	Combined
Bronze medal – third place	1991 Lake Placid	Combined
Bronze medal – third place	1993 Altenmarkt	Aerials
Bronze medal – third place	1993 Altenmarkt	Combined

Kristean Porter (born 3 September 1971) is an American freestyle skier. She was born in Biloxi. She competed at the 1994 Winter Olympics in Lillehammer, in women's aerials. She won a gold medal in combined at the FIS Freestyle World Ski Championships 1995.

In 2020, she was inducted into the National Ski Hall of Fame.
