= Candice Gilg =

French freestyle skier

Personal information
- Nationality: French
- Born: 27 July 1972 (age 53) Dakar, Senegal

Sport
- Country: France
- Sport: Freestyle skiing
Medal record
Women's freestyle skiing
Representing France
World Championships
Gold medal – first place	1995 La Clusaz	Moguls
Gold medal – first place	1997 Nagano	Moguls

Candice Gilg (born 27 July 1972) is a French freestyle skier. She was born in Dakar, Senegal. She competed in the 1992 Winter Olympics in Albertville, and at the 1994 Winter Olympics in Lillehammer, where she placed fifth in women's moguls.

Her brother Youri Gilg is also a freestyle skier.
