= Stacey Blumer =

American freestyle skier

Personal information
- Born: 11 December 1969 (age 55); Altus, Oklahoma, United States

Sport
- Country: United States
- Sport: Freestyle skiing

Stacey Blumer (born 11 December 1969) is an American freestyle skier. She was born in Altus, Oklahoma. She competed at the 1998 Winter Olympics in Nagano, in women's aerials.
