= Altenmarkt im Pongau =

- Municipality
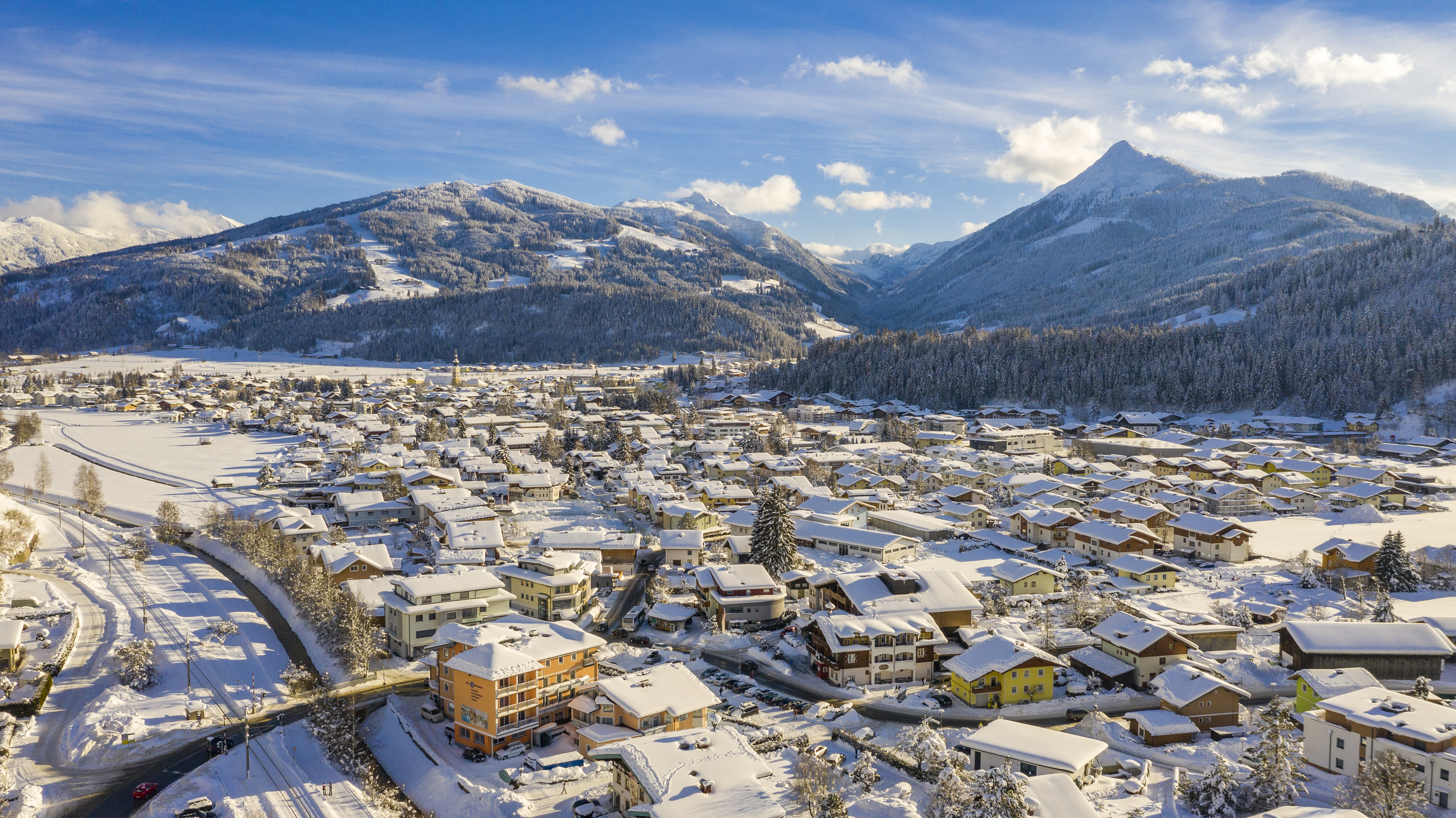
- Altenmarkt im Pongau

- Coat of arms

- Location within Austria
- Coordinates: 47°22′43″N 13°25′22″E
- Country: Austria
- State: Salzburg
- District: St. Johann im Pongau

Government
  - Mayor: Rupert Winter (ÖVP)

Area
  - Total: 48.64 km^{2} (18.78 sq mi)
- Elevation: 842 m (2,762 ft)

Population (2018-01-01)
  - Total: 4,218
  - Density: 86.72/km^{2} (224.6/sq mi)
- Time zone: UTC+1 (CET)
  - Summer (DST): UTC+2 (CEST)
- Postal code: 5541
- Area code: 06452
- Vehicle registration: JO
- Website: www.altenmarkt.at

Altenmarkt im Pongau is a small town in the Austrian state of Salzburg.

== Geography ==
Altenmarkt is situated 65 km southeast of Salzburg.

== Economy ==
The town is principally known for its winter tourism. It is also the location of the factory manufacturing Atomic Skis.

Altenmarkt-Zauchensee is part of the Ski Amadé ski area, with Zauchensee located approximately 10 km south of the town.

== Personalities ==
- Hermann Maier, former alpine skier
- Michael Walchhofer, alpine skier

== Image gallery ==
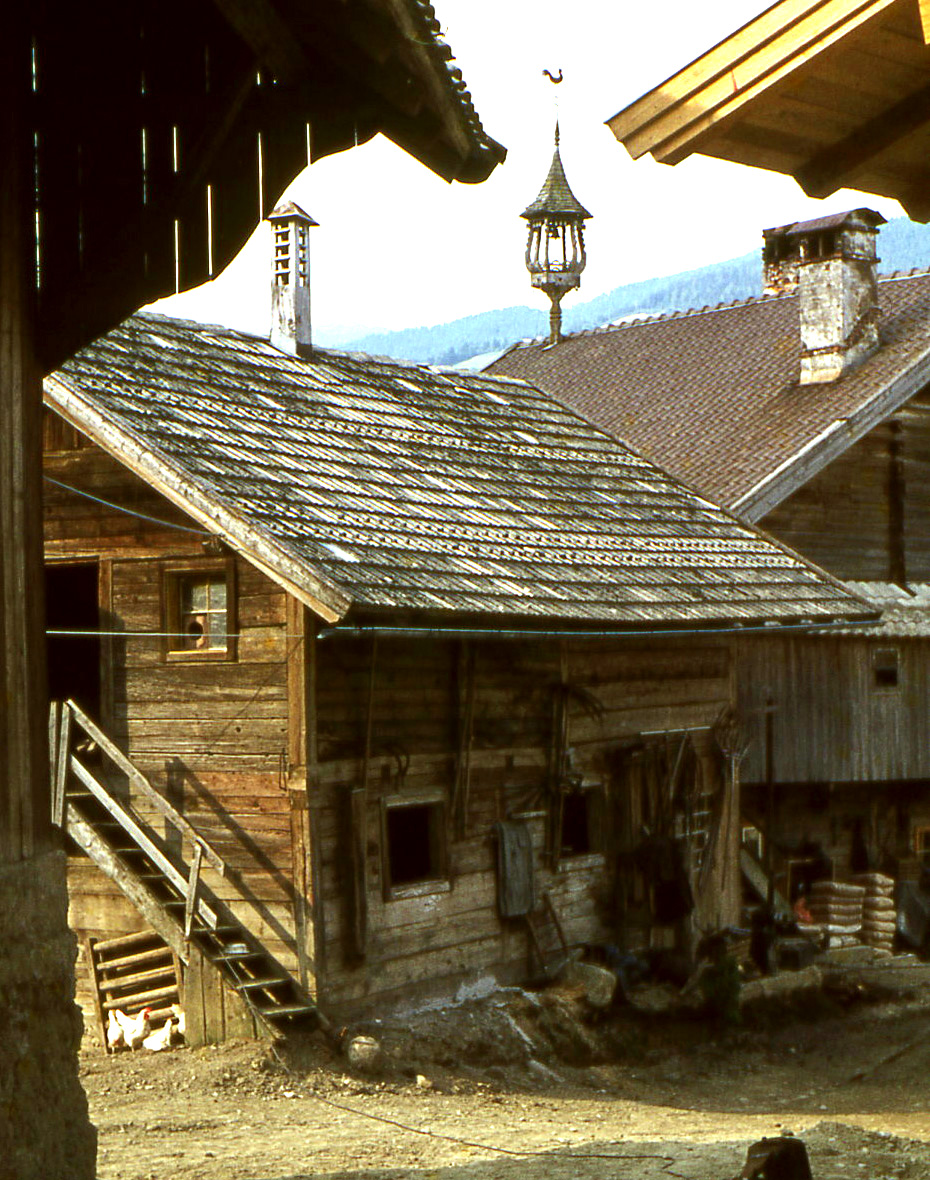
Farm in 1967 with typical bell on the roof

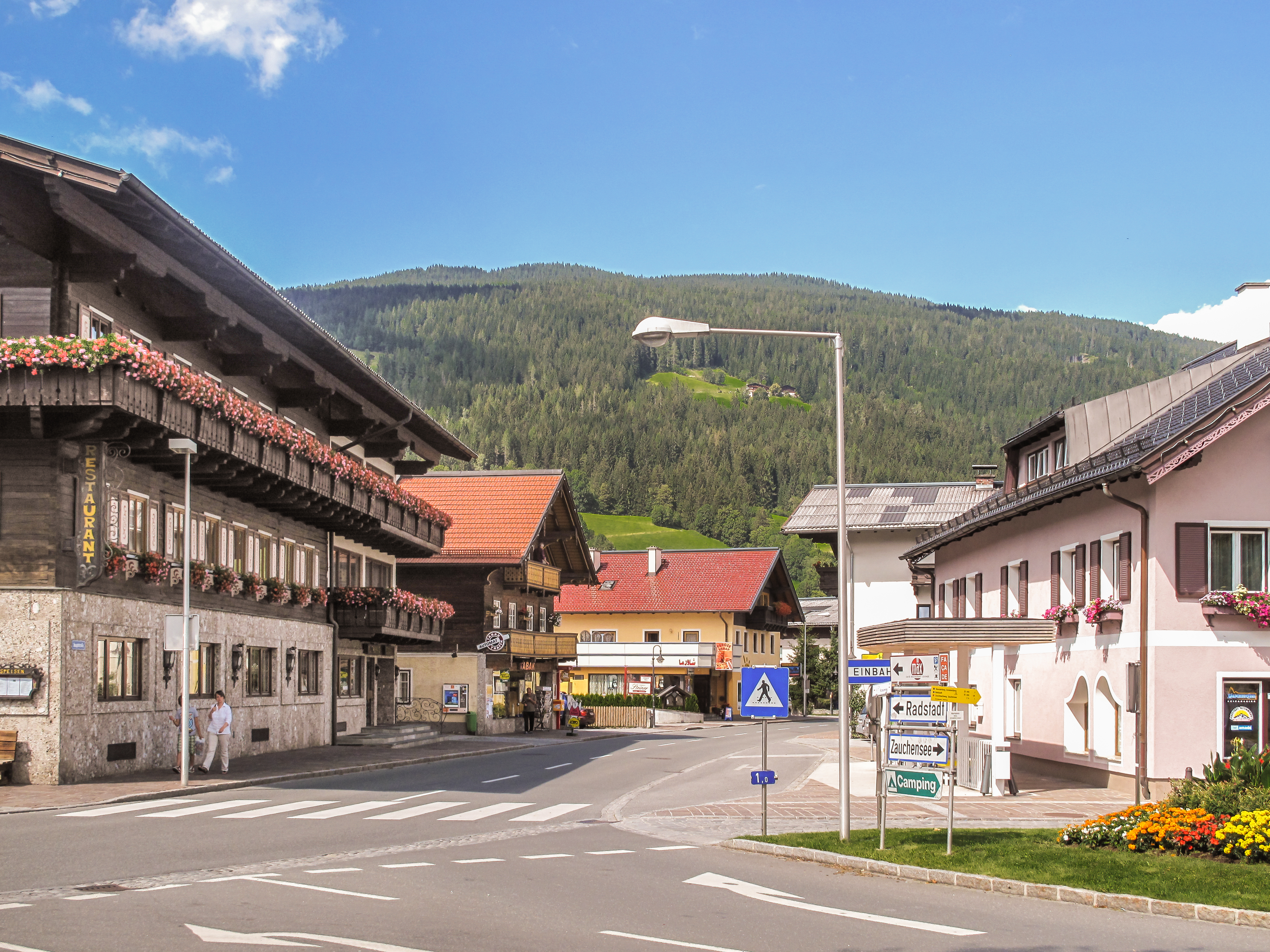
Altenmarkt im Pongau in July 2011, view to a street
