= Åsa Magnusson =

Swedish freestyle skier

Personal information
- Nationality: Swedish
- Born: 26 September 1964 (age 61)

Sport
- Country: Sweden
- Sport: Freestyle skiing
Medal record
Women's freestyle skiing
Representing Sweden
World Championships
Silver medal – second place	1997 Nagano	Ski ballet

Åsa Magnusson (born 26 September 1964) is a Swedish freestyle skier.

She won a silver medal in ski ballet at the FIS Freestyle World Ski Championships 1997. She also competed at the 1989, 1991 and 1995 world championships.
