= Youri Gilg =

French freestyle skier

Personal information
- Nationality: French
- Born: 16 March 1970 (age 55); Le Mans, France

Sport
- Sport: Freestyle skiing

Youri Gilg (born 16 March 1970) is a French freestyle skier. He competed in the men's moguls event at the 1992 Winter Olympics.
