= Annika Johansson =

Swedish freestyle skier (born 1967)

Personal information
- Nationality: Swedish
- Born: 4 March 1967 (age 59)

Sport
- Country: Sweden
- Sport: Freestyle skiing
Medal record
Women's freestyle skiing
Representing Sweden
World Championships
Bronze medal – third place	1995 La Clusaz	Ski ballet
Bronze medal – third place	1997 Nagano	Ski ballet
Bronze medal – third place	1999 Meiringen-Hasliberg	Ski ballet

Annika Johansson (born 4 March 1967) is a Swedish freestyle skier.

She won a bronze medal in ski ballet at the FIS Freestyle World Ski Championships 1995. She also won bronze medals in ski ballet in the 1997 and 1999 world championships.

She took part in the 1992 Winter Olympics in Albertville, where ski ballet was a demonstration event.
