= Andrey Ivanov (skier) =

Russian freestyle skier

Personal information
- Nationality: Russian
- Born: 12 April 1973 (age 51); Krasnoyarsk, Russia

Sport
- Sport: Freestyle skiing

Andrey Ivanov (born 12 April 1973) is a Russian freestyle skier. He competed at the 1992 Winter Olympics and the 1998 Winter Olympics.
