= Colette Brand =

Swiss freestyle skier (born 1967)

Colette Roth-Brand
Personal information
- Born: 5 November 1967 (age 58)

Sport
- Country: Switzerland
- Sport: Freestyle skiing
- Event: Aerials
- Club: Snow Connection Baar
Medal record
Representing Switzerland
Women's freestyle skiing
Olympic Games
Bronze medal – third place	1998 Nagano	Aerials

Colette Roth-Brand (born 5 November 1967 as Colette Brand) is a Swiss freestyle skier and Olympic medalist. She received a bronze medal at the 1998 Winter Olympics in Nagano, in aerials.

She participated at the 1992 Winter Olympics in Albertville, where she finished first in the aerials (demonstration event), and also competed at the 1994 Winter Olympics.

Her son is Noé Roth, who is also a freestyle skier.
