= Jonny Moseley =

American freestyle skier

- Moseley in 2026

Personal information
- Born: August 27, 1975 (age 51) San Juan, Puerto Rico
- Spouse: Malia Rich
- Children: 2
Medal record
Men's freestyle skiing
Representing the United States
Olympic Games
| Gold medal – first place | 1998 Nagano | Moguls |
World Championships
| Bronze medal – third place | 1995 La Clusaz | Combined |

Jonathan William Moseley (born August 27, 1975) is an American freestyle skier and television presenter. He is the first person born in Puerto Rico to become a member of the U.S. Ski Team. He is also known for hosting three seasons of MTV's The Challenge, which was formerly known as Real World/Road Rules Challenge. He has also hosted four reunion specials for Battle of the Sexes, the sequel of Battle of the Seasons, Rivals II and Free Agents.

== Early years ==
Moseley was born on August 27, 1975, to Barbara Moseley, a real estate broker, and Tom Moseley, son of Tim Moseley, developer of Paradise Cay, California, in San Juan, Puerto Rico. In 1978, he saw snow for the first time when his family went on a trip to California. Eventually, his family moved to Tiburon, California, a suburb north of San Francisco where he attended The Branson School in Ross, California. His family would go to the Sierra Nevada every weekend. This, and the fact that he was a better skier than his brothers, inspired the then nine-year-old Moseley to take skiing lessons. In 1992, he joined the Squaw Valley Freestyle Ski Team and soon won his first Junior National title in Freestyle Skiing; he graduated from high school in 1993 and that same year was selected for the U.S. Ski Team.

== United States Ski Team ==
Moseley tried but did not qualify for the 1994 Winter Olympics held at Lillehammer, Norway and became determined to qualify for the 1998 Olympics. In 1995, he enrolled at UC Davis, but his education was interrupted by his intense training.

In 1998, Moseley participated in and won the first two World Cup events of that year, leading to his participation in the 1998 Winter Olympics held in Nagano, Japan, where he won a gold medal. Later that year he secured the 1998 World Cup Mogul Skiing title with nine wins that season. He also won the U.S. National title.

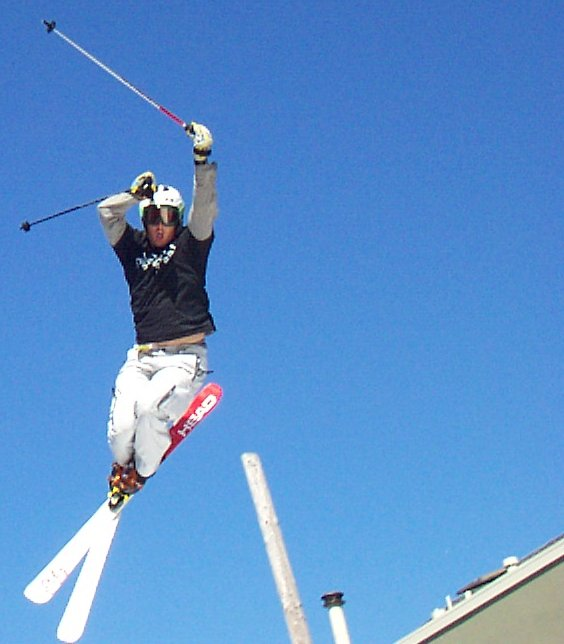
Moseley doing a trick jump at the Icer Air 2005 event held on the streets of San Francisco, September 29, 2005.

In 1999, Moseley challenged the International Skiing federation to change its policy to allow its athletes to participate in professional events, such as ESPN's X Games where he earned a silver medal in the Big Air event. Moseley was the first skier to medal in both the X-Games (silver) and the Olympics (Gold).

In 2000, Moseley won the U.S. Freeskiing Open and in 2001 regained a spot in the U.S. Ski Team at the World Cup qualifications held at Sunday River, Maine. In 2002, Moseley competed but came in fourth place in the Olympic Games.

In 2002, Moseley gave the commencement convocation address at UC Berkeley. The choice by the senior class committee was controversial at the time because Moseley had dropped out of college.

== Honors and recognitions ==
Among the honors and recognitions which Moseley has received is a parade in his honor in which San Francisco Mayor Willie Brown declared a "Jonny Moseley Day" and handed him the "key" to the city. He was named "Sportsman of the Year" (1998) by the U.S. Olympic Committee and has been featured on the covers of Freeskier and Rolling Stone magazines.

He was also chosen to be the traditional post-Olympics athlete host of Saturday Night Live in 2002, hosting the March 2, 2002, episode of the show with musical guest Outkast. On the show, he performed a sketch called "Jonny's Journey," in which he went "around the world on a never-ending Dinner Roll" via a green screen.

Moseley is largely credited with having brought the Iron Cross trick into the limelight, where the athlete crosses their skis midair during a jump. This trick was a radical departure from the old school air tricks, which include Daffies, Backscratchers and Moonwalks (see Glen Plake).

== Personal life ==
Moseley married Malia Rich, a business manager, on March 25, 2006, in Telluride, Colorado. Moseley met Rich in high school; the couple started dating in 2001 and got engaged on April 20, 2003.

On September 4, 2007, Rich gave birth to the couple's first child, named Jonathan "Jack" William Moseley Jr. in San Francisco, California. On May 25, 2010, their second son, Tommy, was born.

== Later years ==
Moseley launched a web site that sells products with his logo on them and has appeared on advertisements for McDonald's and Sprint. He graduated from the University of California, Berkeley on May 17, 2007, with a B.A. in American Studies focusing on Consumer and Popular Culture. In December 2001, 3DO released Jonny Moseley Mad Trix a level-based extreme skiing game named after the skier.

Moseley, who currently lives in California, was the host of three seasons of the MTV reality show Real World/Road Rules Challenge (now called The Challenge). He is part of the celebrity panel of judges (along with Steve Garvey and Oksana Baiul) on the ABC show "Master of Champions". After the 2002 Olympics Moseley hosted Saturday Night Live.

Moseley developed an aerial ski move called "The Dinner Roll" and spoke about it during a 2002 speech at UC Berkeley:

The Dinner Roll is a trick I developed for the '99 X-Games. It's a 720 degree off axis rotation, wherein you ski off the jump, do two full rotations, one on the horizontal plane and the other on the vertical plane. At the X-Games where everything is "extreme" and "rad" the jumps are big, and you have lots of time in the air. The Olympic moguls course is a whole different ball game. It's steep, with tight turns, and a small narrow technical jump, with an unforgiving landing. The trick was so new that we had to appeal to the Olympic Skiing Federation in order just to do it. We had to show them that it fell within their rule stating "no inverted tricks in the moguls" and also prove that it was not dangerous. After lobbying and video explanation we pushed it through by one vote, much to the chagrin of the European countries.

In 2007, Warren Miller's Playground was released with Moseley as the narrator. He was also in the movie as he has been in a few Warren Miller ski movies in the past. Moseley has narrated every film since. He has gone on to narrate a number of other Warren Miller movies. Moseley also used to host a weekly radio program on Sirius/XM's channel 41. The show was called "The Moseley Method". Moseley was the color analyst for NBC at the 2010 Olympics in Vancouver for the moguls, aerials and ski cross events.

In 2010 he was cast on the ABC show Skating with the Stars where he was paired with retired Pairs skater Brooke Castile. Mosley finished in third place as second runner-up. He is currently the host of the latest viral marketing campaign by Ford Motor Company, Focus Rally America.

In 2012 Moseley became a co-host of "American Ninja Warrior" on G4. The show started broadcasting on NBC and he continued his hosting role. In 2013, Moseley appeared on Undercover Boss, playing the host of the fictitious reality show which Squaw Valley/Alpine Meadows CEO Andy Wirth is supposedly a contestant on.

== See also ==
- List of Puerto Ricans
- Sports in Puerto Rico
