= Marie Lindgren =

Swedish freestyle skier

Medal record

Women's freestyle skiing

Representing Sweden

Olympic Games
Silver medal – second place	1994 Lillehammer	Aerials

FIS Freestyle World Ski Championships
Silver medal – second place	1993 Altenmarkt	Aerials
Silver medal – second place	1995 La Clusaz	Aerials

Marie Lindgren (born 26 March 1970) is a Swedish freestyle skier and Olympic medalist. She received a silver medal at the 1994 Winter Olympics in Lillehammer, in aerials.

She finished 2nd in the aerials (demonstration event) at the 1992 Winter Olympics in Albertville.
