= Kirchberg in Tirol =

- Municipality
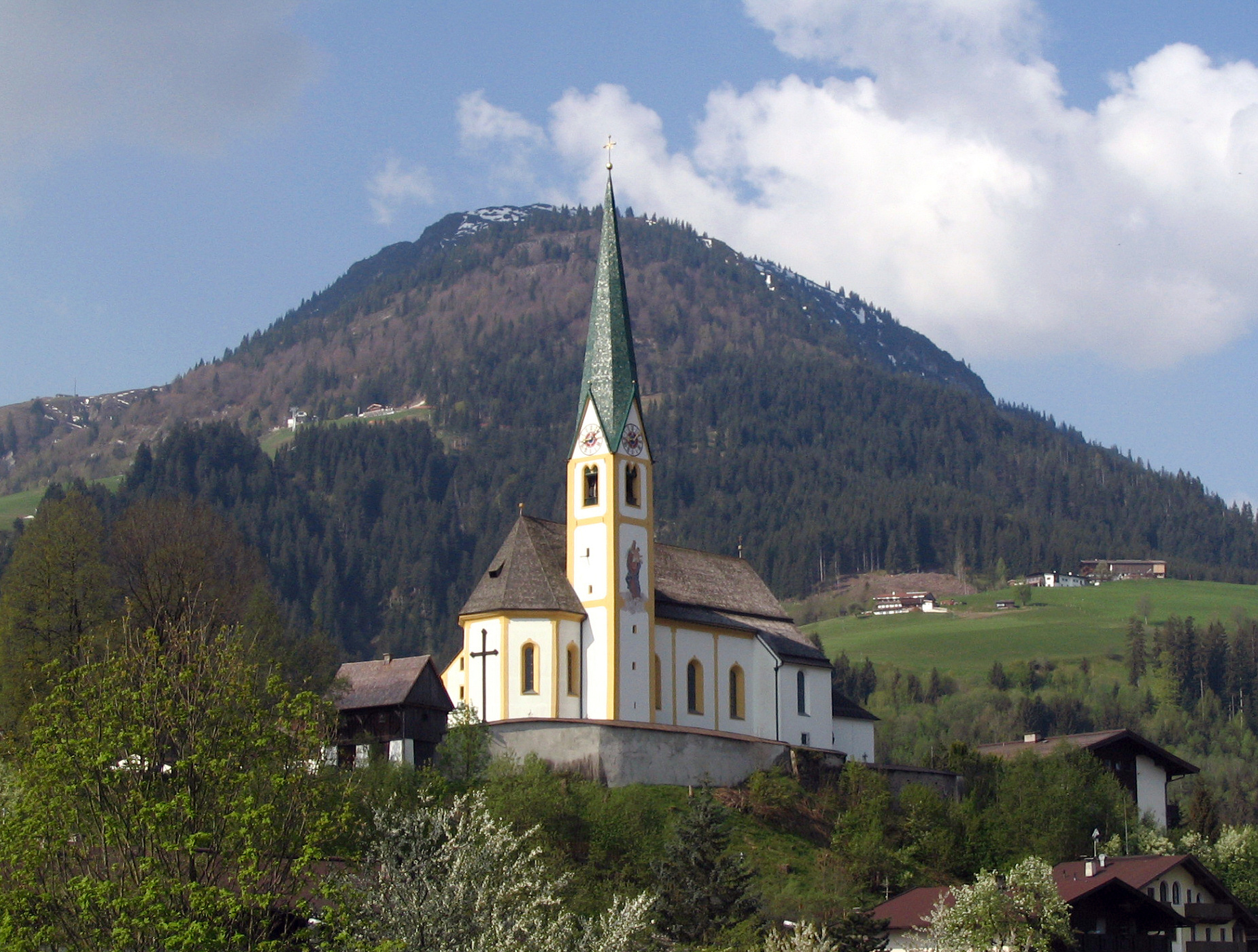

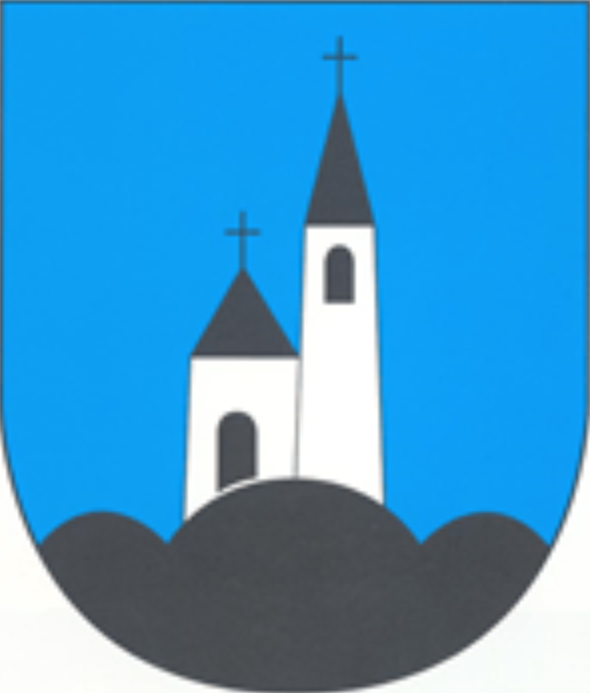
- Coat of arms

- Location within Austria
- Coordinates: 47°27′00″N 12°19′00″E
- Country: Austria
- State: Tyrol
- District: Kitzbühel

Government
  - Mayor: Ewald Haller

Area
  - Total: 97.81 km^{2} (37.76 sq mi)
- Elevation: 837 m (2,746 ft)

Population (2018-01-01)
  - Total: 5,245
  - Density: 53.62/km^{2} (138.9/sq mi)
- Time zone: UTC+1 (CET)
  - Summer (DST): UTC+2 (CEST)
- Postal code: 6365
- Area code: +43 5357
- Vehicle registration: KB
- Website: kirchberg.tirol.gv.at

Kirchberg in Tirol is a municipality in the Austrian state of Tyrol in the Kitzbühel district. It is located 6 km (4 mi.) west of Kitzbühel. It is also a village.

== Population ==
Historical population
Year	Pop.	±%
1869	1,655	—
1880	1,669	+0.8%
1890	1,683	+0.8%
1900	1,638	−2.7%
1910	2,100	+28.2%
1923	2,104	+0.2%
1934	2,493	+18.5%
1939	2,692	+8.0%
1951	2,842	+5.6%
1961	3,032	+6.7%
1971	3,544	+16.9%
1981	3,718	+4.9%
1991	4,092	+10.1%
2001	4,958	+21.2%
2011	5,153	+3.9%

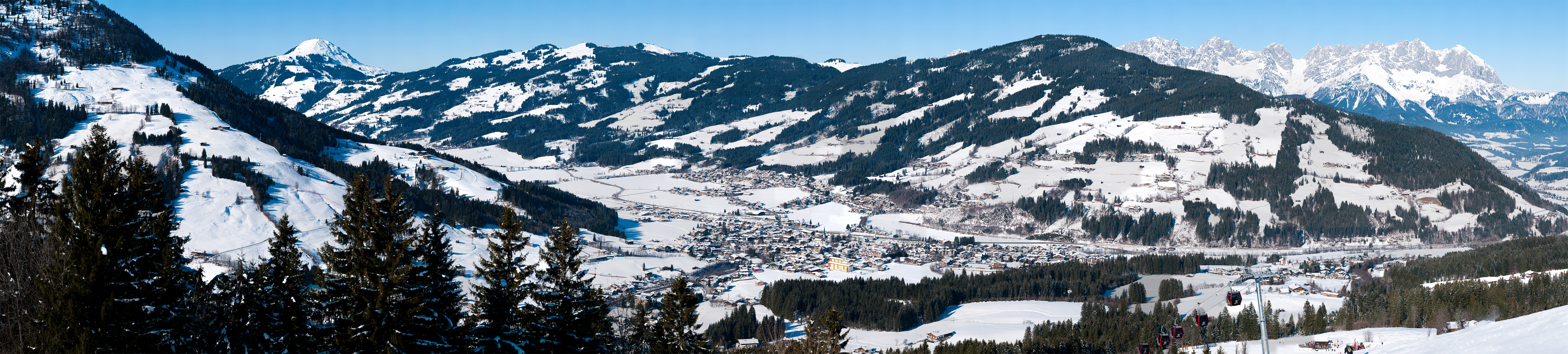
