= Oksana Kushchenko =

Russian freestyle skier

Oksana Kushenko
Personal information
- Nationality: Russian
- Born: 18 February 1972 (age 54)

Sport
- Country: Russia
- Sport: Freestyle skiing
Medal record
Women's freestyle skiing
Representing Russia
World Championships
Gold medal – first place	1997 Nagano	Ski ballet
Silver medal – second place	1999 Meiringen-Hasliberg	Ski ballet

Oksana Vladimirovna Kushenko (Russian: Окса́на Влади́мировна Ку́щенко) (born 18 February 1972) is a Russian freestyle skier.

She won a gold medal in ski ballet at the FIS Freestyle World Ski Championships 1997, and a silver medal at the FIS Freestyle World Ski Championships 1999. She also competed at the 1991 and 1995 world championships.
