= Alexis Blanc =

French freestyle skier

Personal information
- Nationality: French
- Born: 24 November 1970 (age 54); Annecy, France

Sport
- Sport: Freestyle skiing

Alexis Blanc (born 24 November 1970) is a French freestyle skier. He competed in the men's aerials event at the 1994 Winter Olympics.
