= John Smart (skier) =

Canadian freestyle skier

John Warren Smart
Personal information
- Nationality: Canadian
- Born: February 20, 1965 (age 61) Témiscamingue, Quebec, Canada

Sport
- Sport: Freestyle skiing
- Event: Moguls

Achievements and titles
- Olympic finals: 5th (1992), 7th (1994)

John Warren Smart (born February 20, 1965) is a Canadian freestyle skier. He was born in Témiscamingue. He competed at the 1992 Winter Olympics in Albertville, where he placed fifth in moguls, and at the 1994 Winter Olympics in Lillehammer, where he placed seventh in moguls.

Smart was inducted into the Canadian Ski Hall of Fame in 2003.

== Personal life ==
Smart currently resides in Whistler, British Columbia, and is married with two kids. In March 2026, his youngest son Kai, a skier and filmmaker, died as a result of injuries sustained during an avalanche in Japan.
