= Christian Rijavec =

Austrian freestyle skier

Personal information
- Nationality: Austrian
- Born: 18 April 1972 (age 54) Klagenfurt, Austria

Sport
- Sport: Freestyle skiing

Christian Rijavec (born 18 April 1972) is an Austrian freestyle skier. He competed at the 1994 Winter Olympics and the 1998 Winter Olympics.
