= Sébastien Foucras =

French freestyle skier (born 1971)

Medal record

Representing France

Men's freestyle skiing

Olympic Games
Silver medal – second place	1998 Nagano	Aerials

Sébastien Foucras (born 4 January 1971) is a French freestyle skier and Olympic medalist. He received a silver medal at the 1998 Winter Olympics in Nagano, in aerials.

He participated in the Fort Boyard game show in 1996, helping Adeline Blondieau's team win 76,660 French francs.
