= Shokanbetsudake Mountains =

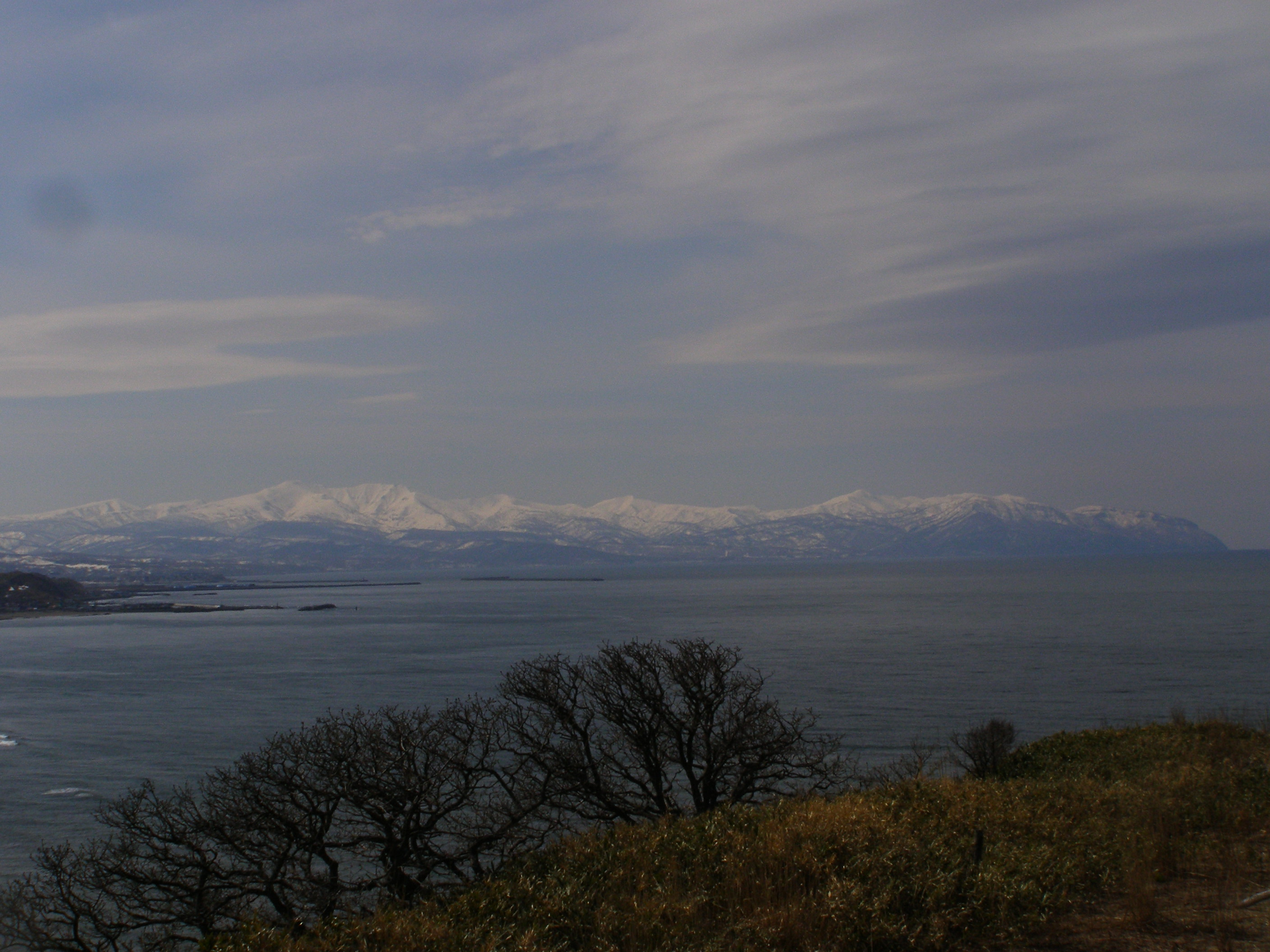
- View from Obira (April 2009)

Highest point
- Peak: Mount Shokanbetsu, Mashike and Shintotsukawa in Rumoi and Sorachi Subprefecture, Japan
- Elevation: 1,491.6 m (4,894 ft)
- Coordinates: 43°42′57″N 141°31′23″E

Naming
- Native name: 暑寒別岳連峰 (Japanese); Shokanbetsudake-Renpō (Japanese)

Geography
- Country: Japan
- State: Hokkaidō
- Regions: Ishikari, Rumoi and Sorachi
- Parent range: Mashike Mountains
- Biome: alpine climate

Geology
- Orogeny: island arc
- Rock type: Volcanic

Shokanbetsudake Mountains (暑寒別岳連峰, Shokanbetsudake-Renpō) are a group of volcanic mountains on the western coast of Hokkaidō (暑寒別岳連峰). It is part of the Mashike Mountains, separated from the other part of the Mashike Mountains to the south, the Kabato Mountains by the Hamamasu River. To the north lie the Teshio Mountains. Shokanbetsudake mountains are part of Shokanbetsu-Teuri-Yagishiri Quasi-National Park.

The peaks of the Shokanbetsudake Mountains include the following:

- Mount Shokanbetsu (1492m)
- Mount Kunbetsu (1376m)
- Mount Okutoppu (1346m)
- Mount Hamamasu (1258m)
- Mount Minami Shokan (1257m)
- Mount Ofuyu (1198m)
- Mount Etai (1060m)

Mount Minami Shokan, Mount Kunbetsu and Mount Etai define a triangle that surrounds the Uryū Wetlands (雨竜沼湿原, Uryūnumashitsugen).

== Flora and fauna ==
Unlike on Honshū, you can see alpine plants at altitudes as low as 1000 meters in the Mashike mountains.
