= List of ski areas and resorts in Japan =

This is a list of ski areas and resorts in Japan. The list includes areas operating now.

== Hokkaidō ==
=== Sōya Subprefecture ===
- Esashi Town Mikasayama Ski Area
- Nakatonbetsu Town Kotobuki Ski Area
- Saroma Town Ski Area
- Sarufutsu Village Ski Area
- Tenpoku Ski Area
- Toyotomi Town Toyotomi Onsen Ski Area
- Wakkanai City Komadori Ski Area

=== Kamikawa Subprefecture ===
- Alpha Resort Tomamu
- Asahi Ski Area
- Asahigatake Ski Course
- Asahiyama City Ski Area
- Bifuka Ski Area
- Canmore Ski Village
- Daisetsuzan Kurodake Ski Area
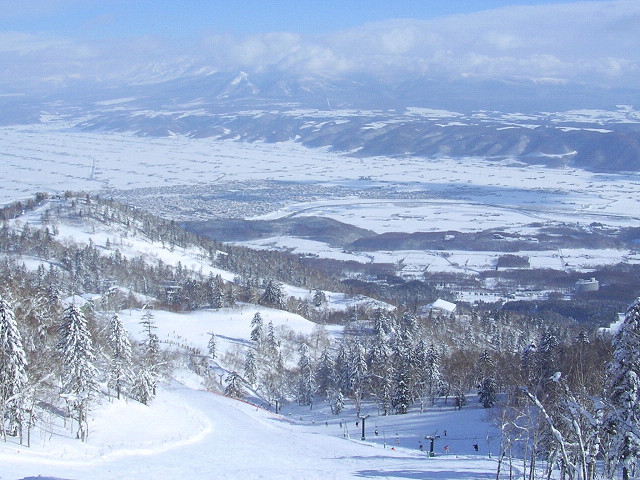
  Furano Ski Resort
- Furano Ski Reosrt
- Hinode Ski Area
- Inosawa City Ski Area
- Kamui Ski Area
- Kenbuchi Town Bibakarasu Ski Area
- Minami Furano Ski Area
- Nakafurano Hokusei Ski Area
- Nayoro Piyashiri Ski Area
- Otoi Fuji Ski Area
- Pippu Ski Area
- Santa Present Park Mallows Gelände
- Shibetsu City Hinata Ski Area
- Shirogane Ski Highland Park Hill Valley
- Tōma Town Ski Area
- Wassamu Higashiyama Ski Area

=== Rumoi Subprefecture ===
- Horonobe Town Higashigaoka Ski Area
- Mashike Town Shokanbetsudake Ski Area
- Obira Town Bōyōdai Ski Area
- Teshio Town Ski Area

=== Abashiri Subprefecture ===
- Abashiri Lake View Ski Area
- Engaru Rock Valley Ski Area
- Kamiyūbetsu Town Gokazan Ski Area
- Kitami Wakamatsu City Ski Area
- Kiyosato Town Midori Ski Area
- Monbetsu City Ōyama Ski Area
- Oketo Town Minamigaoka Ski Area
- Okoppe Town Ski Area
- Rubeshibe Town Happōdai Ski Area
- Ski Mebius
- Takinoue Town Sakuragaoka Ski Area

=== Nemuro Subprefecture ===
- Kanayama Ski Area
- Rausu Town Ski Area

=== Kushiro Subprefecture ===
- Akan Kohan Ski Area
- Akan Royal Valley Ski Area
- Birao Ski Area

=== Tokachi Subprefecture ===
- Chūrui Village Shiroganedai Ski Area
- Memuro Ski Area
- Nisshō Ski Area
- Nukabira Onsen Ski Area
- Sahoro Resort
- Shintokuyama Ski Area

=== Sorachi Subprefecture ===
- Ashibetsu Ski Area
- Bibai Ski Area
- Fukagawa Ski Area
- Horotachi Ski Area
- Iwamizawa Haginoyama City Ski Gelände
- Kamoidake Kokusai Ski Area
- Kuriyama Town Ski Area
- Mitsui Greenland White Park
- Mount Akabira Ski Area
- Mt. Racey
- Naganuma Ski Area
- Numata Town Takaho Ski Area
- Shintotsukawa Town Socchidake Ski Area
- Tsukigata Town Ski Area

=== Hidaka Subprefecture ===
- Hidaka Kokusai Ski Area

=== Ishikari Subprefecture ===
- Atsuta Village Ski Area
- Eniwa City Ski Area
- Fu's Snow Area
- Hamamasu Village Ski Area
- Ishikari Heigen Skiing Ground
- Kōrakuen Kitahiroshima Ski Land
- Sapporo Bankei Ski Area
- Sapporo Kitahiroshima Prince Family Ski Area
- Sapporo Kokusai Ski Area
- Sapporo Moiwayama Ski Area
- Sapporo Teine
- Takino Snow World

=== Shiribeshi Subprefecture ===
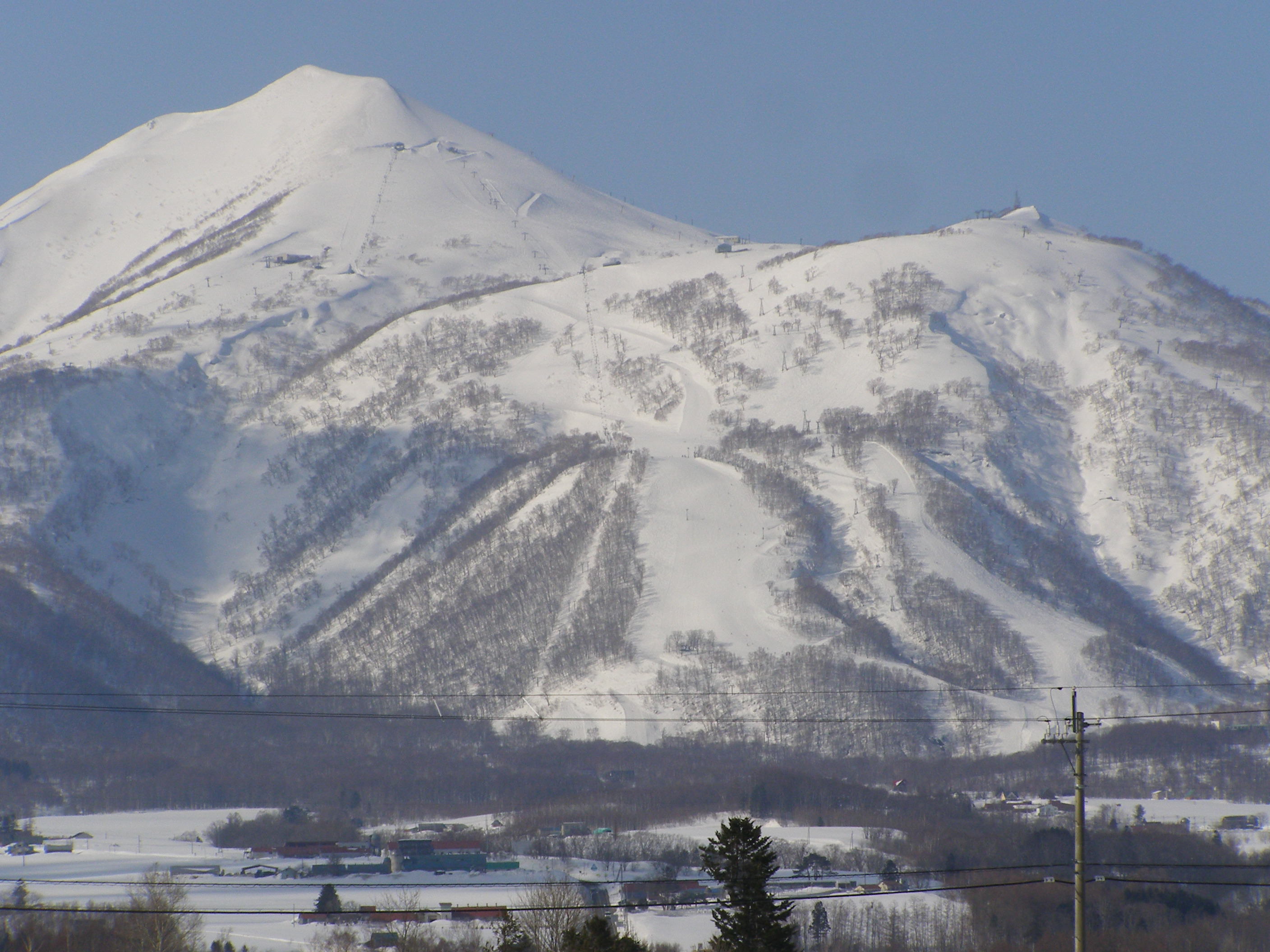
Niseko higashiyama

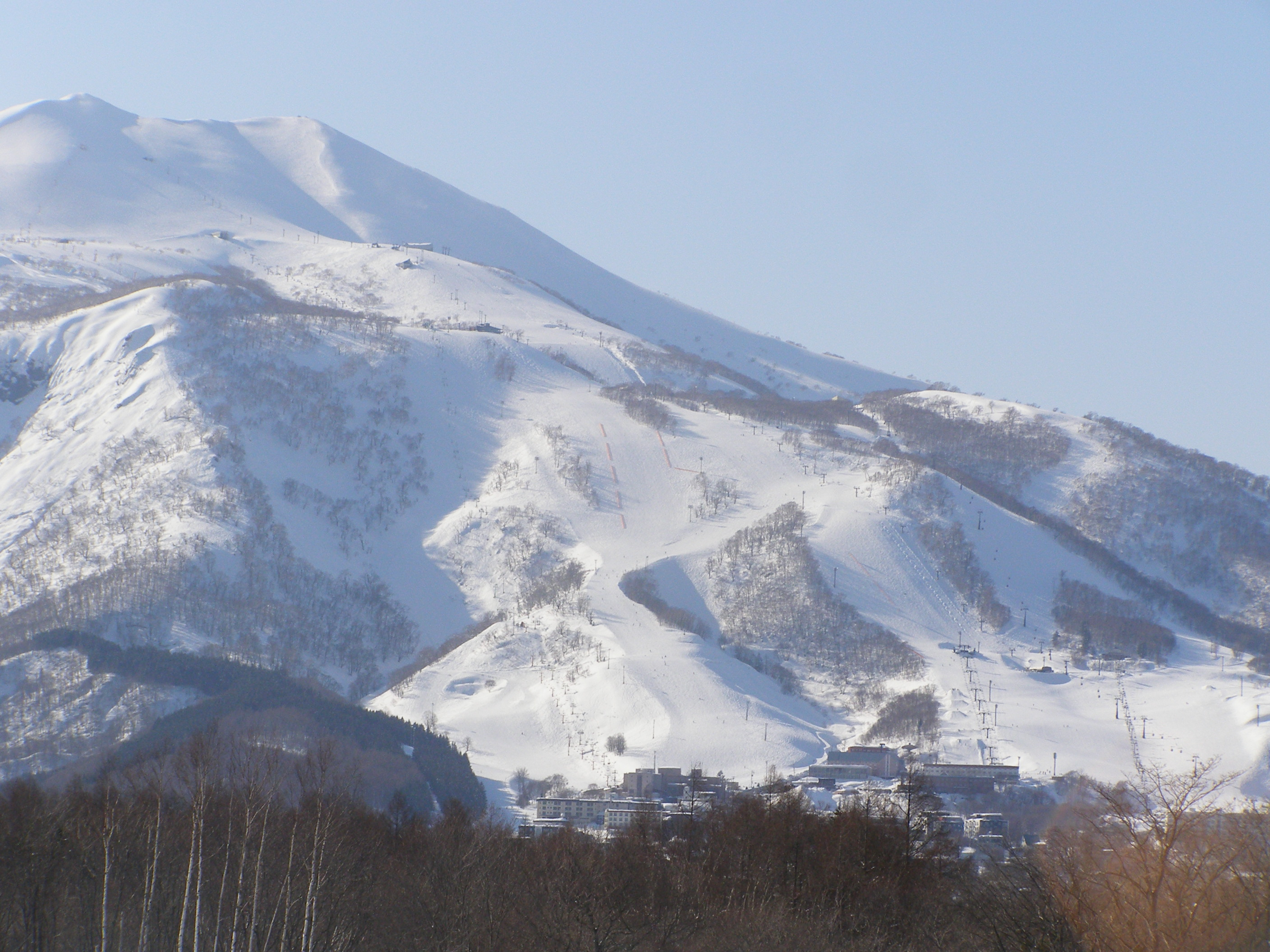
Niseko Mt. Resort Grand Hirafu

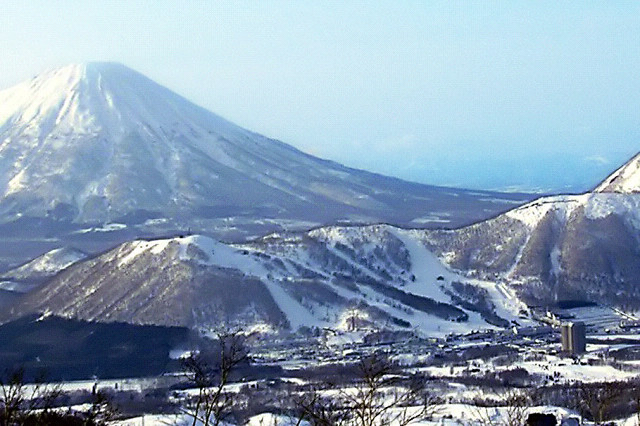
Rusutsu Resort

- Asarigawa Onsen Ski Area
- Furubira Kazoku Ryokōmura Ski Area
- Kiroro Snow World
- Kutchan Town Asahigaoka Ski Area
- Nakayamatōge Ski Area
- Niki Town Ski Area
- Niseko Annupuri International Ski Resort
- Niseko Higashiyama Ski Resort
- Niseko Moiwa Ski Area
- Niseko Mt. Resort Grand Hirafu
- Niseko Hanazono Resort
- Niseko United
- Niseko Weiss Ski Area
- Otaru Tenguyama Ski Area
- Rankoshi Town Chisenupuri Ski Area
- Rusutsu Resort
- Shakotan Town Outdoor Sports Forest Ski Area
- Snow Cruise Onze

=== Iburi Subprefecture ===
- Anpeizan Ski Area
- Hobetsu Ski Area
- Muroran Kōgen Danpara Ski Area
- Noboribetsu Kōgen Karls Onsen Sanlaiva
- Orofure Ski Area
- Windsor Snow Village

=== Oshima Subprefecture ===
- Greenpia Ōnuma Ski Area
- Hakodate Nanae Ski Area
- Niyama Kōgen Ski Area

=== Hiyama Subprefecture ===
- Imakane Town Pirika Ski Area

== Tōhoku region ==
=== Aomori Prefecture ===
- Ajigasawa Ōtakayama Ski Resort
- Hakkōda Ski Area
- Imabetsu Ski Area
- Iwakiyama Hyakuzawa Ski Area
- Iwakiyama Skyline Ski Area
- Kamafuseyama Ski Area
- Makado Onsen Ski Area
- Moya Hills
- Aomori Spring Ski Resort
- Ōwani Onsen Ski Area
- Shichinohe Town Ski Area
- Sōma Romantopia Ski Area
- Takko 229 Ski Land
- Tōō Ski Area
- Towadako Onsen Ski Area
- Yagoshiyama Skiing Area

=== Iwate Prefecture ===
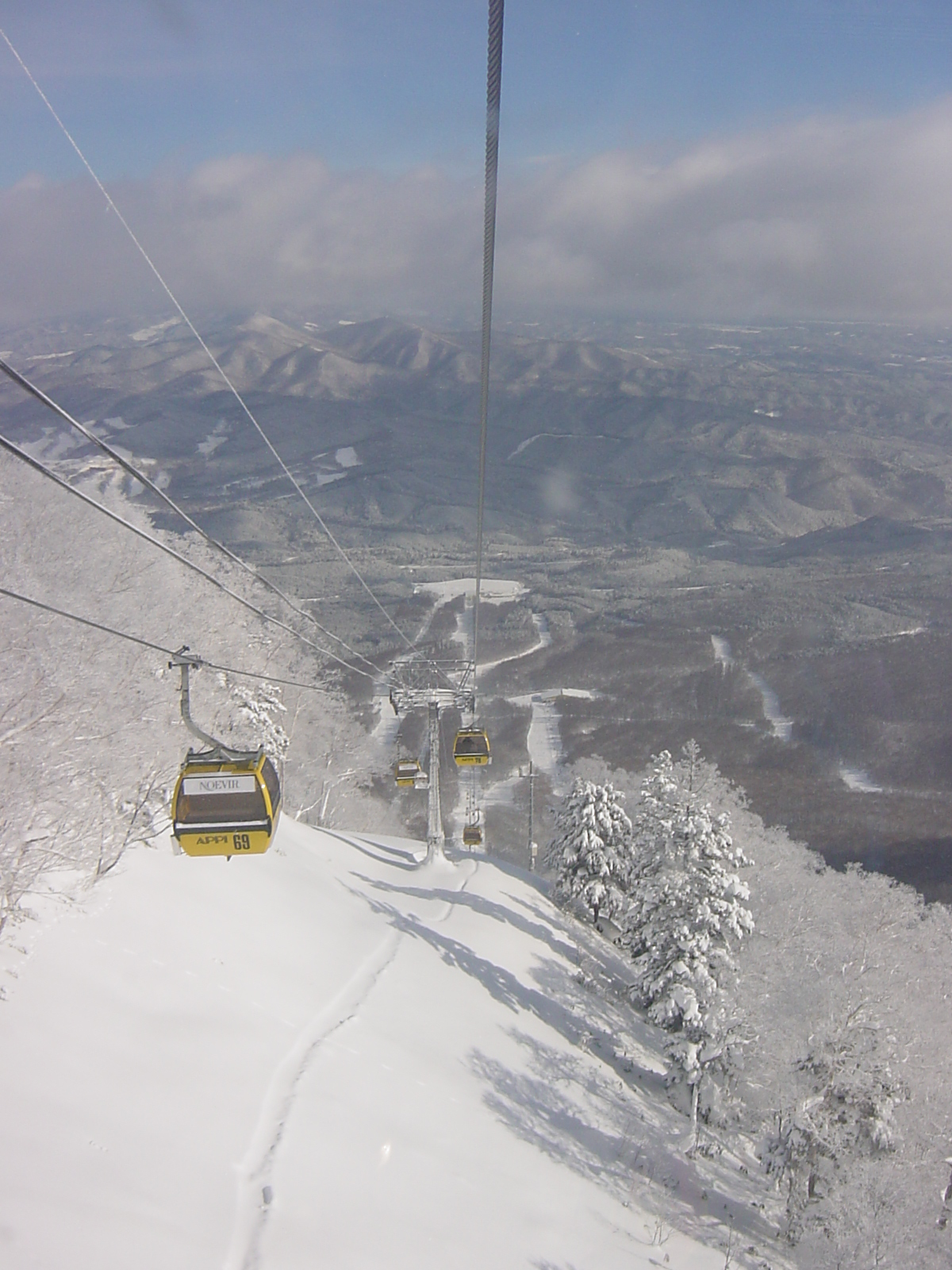
Appi Kogen Ski Resort

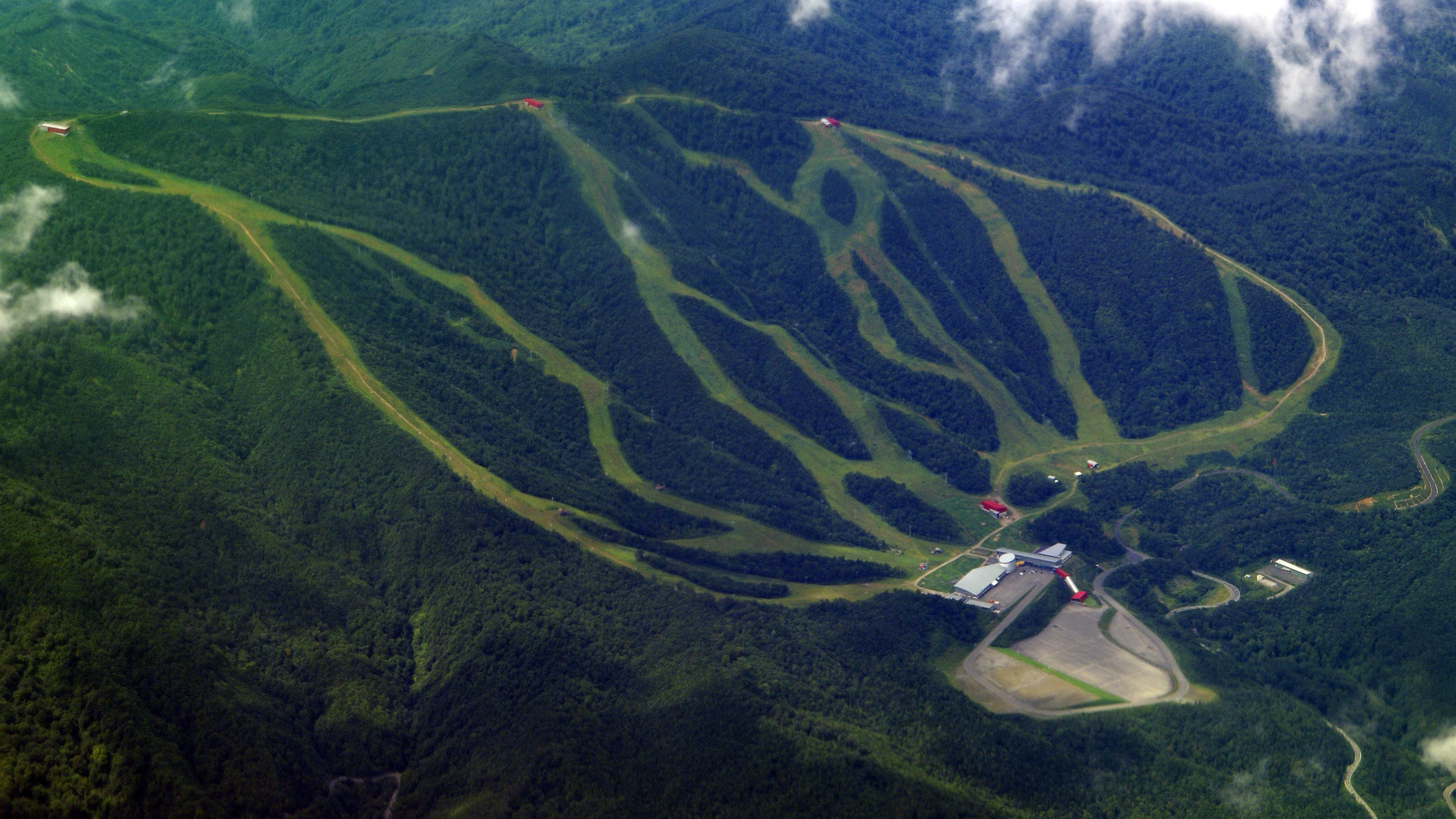
Getō Kōgen Ski Area in August

- Amihari Onsen Ski Area
- Appi Kogen Ski Resort
- Getō Kōgen Ski Area
- Hachimantai Resort Ski Area
- Hachimantai Ski Area
- Hayasaka Kōgen Snow Land
- Himekayu Ski Area
- Iwate Kōgen Snowpark
- Iwayama Park Land Ski Area
- Kunimidaira Ski Area
- Matsurube Snow Park
- Morioka Highland Ski Area
- Nishiwaga Town Yuda Ski Area
- Okunakayama Kōgen Ski Area
- Ōshū City Koeji Ski Area
- Shizukuishi Ski Area
- Tōno City Akahane Ski Area

=== Miyagi Prefecture ===
- Izumigatake Ski Area
- Miyagi Zaō Eboshi Ski Area
- Miyagi Zaō Shichikashuku Ski Area
- Miyagi Zaō Shiraishi Ski Area
- Miyagi Zaō Sumikawa Snow Park Ski Area
- Resort Park Onikōbe Ski Area
- Spring Valley Izumi Kōgen Ski Area
- St. Mary Ski Resorts
- Yakurai Family Ski Area

=== Akita Prefecture ===
- Akita Hachimantai Ski Area
- Akita Prefecture Tazawako Ski Area
- Ani Ski Area
- Chōkai Kōgen Yashima Ski Area
- Fujisato Town Ski Area
- Gosannen Ski Area
- Hanawa Ski Area
- Jeunesse Kurikoma Ski Slope
- Kyōwa Ski Area
- Ohdai ski Resort
- Ōmagari Family Ski Area
- Suishōzan Ski Area
- Taiheizan Ski Area Opas
- Tengamori Ski Area

=== Yamagata Prefecture ===
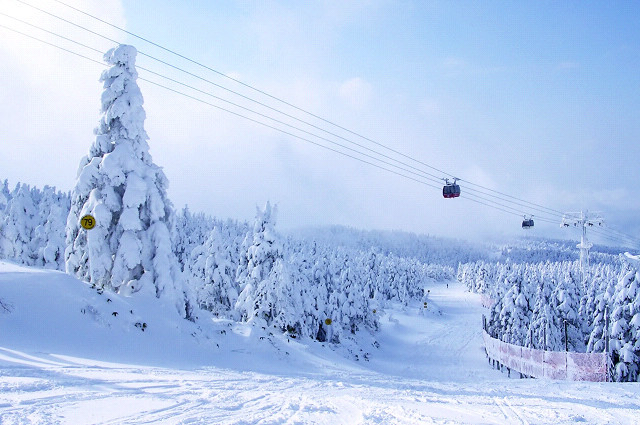
Yamagata Zaō Onsen Ski Resort

- Akiyama Ski Area
- Asahi Shizenkan Snow Park
- Crico International Ski Area
- Gassan Ski Area
- Hagurosan Ski Area
- Kamuro Ski Area
- Kurobushi Kōgen Snow Park Jangle Jungle
- Matsuyama Ski Area
- Omoshiroyama Kōgen Ski Park
- Satoyama Ski Area
- Shinjo Ski Area
- Tendō Kōgen Ski Area
- Tengendai Kōgen Ski Area
- Yamagata Akakura Onsen Ski Area
- Yamagata Zao Onsen Ski Resort

The largest single ski resort in Japan, 1.86 square kilometres (0.72 sq mi).

- Yonezawa Ski Area
- Yudonosan Ski Area
- Zaō Liza Ski World
- Zaō Sarukura Ski Area

=== Fukushima Prefecture ===
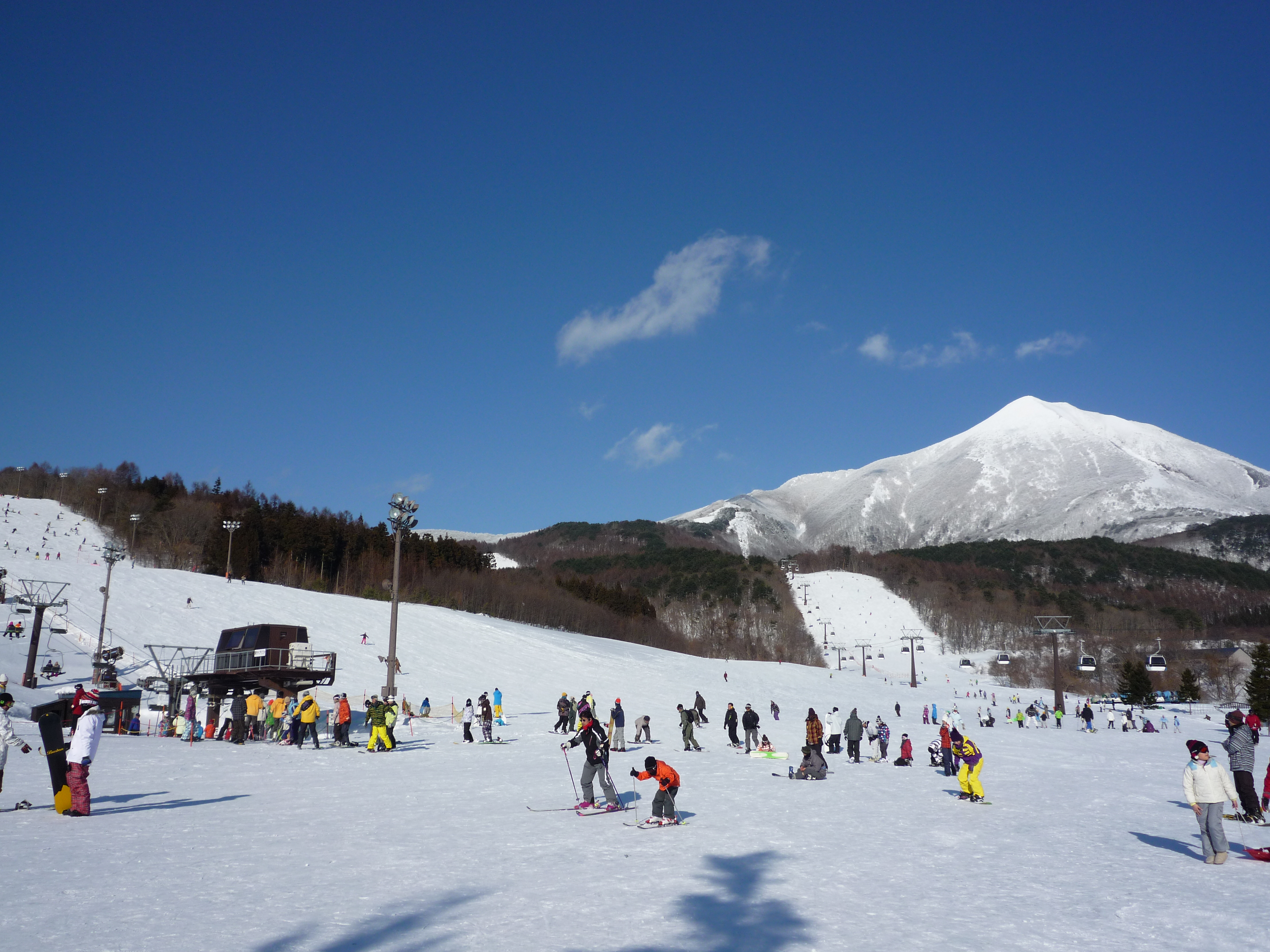
Alts Snow Park & Resort.

- Adatara Kōgen Ski Resort
- Aizu Kōgen Daikura Ski Area
- Aizu Kōgen Nangō Ski Area
- Aizu Kōgen Takahata Ski Area
- Aizu Kōgen Takatsue Ski Area
- Aizubange Town Ski Area
- Alts Snow Park & Resort
- Azuma Ski Area
- Bandai Kokusai Ski Area
- Fairy Land Kaneyama Ski Area
- Gran Deco Snow Resort
- Grandee Hatoriko Ski Resort
- Hinoemata Onsen Ski Area
- Inawashiro Resort Ski Area
- Inawashiro Ski Area
- Listel Ski Fantasia
- Minowa Ski Area
- Nihonmatsu Shiozawa Ski Area
- Numajiri Ski Area
- Sannokura Ski Area
- Ski Resort Ten-ei
- Tadami Ski Area
- Ura Bandai Nekoma Ski Area
- Ura Bandai Ski Area
- Yanaizu Onsen Ski Area
- Yokomuki Onsen Ski Area

== Kantō region ==
=== Ibaraki Prefecture ===
- Kamui Ryūgasaki Snowboard Park (Indoor)

=== Tochigi Prefecture ===
- Edelweiss Ski Resort
- Hunter Mt. Shiobara
- Kōtoku Cross-Country Ski Area
- Mt. Jeans Ski Resort Nasu
- Nasu Onsen Family Ski Area
- Nikkō Kirifuri Kōgen Ski Area
- Nikkō Shōbugahama Ski Area
- Nikkō Yumoto Ski Area

=== Gunma Prefecture ===
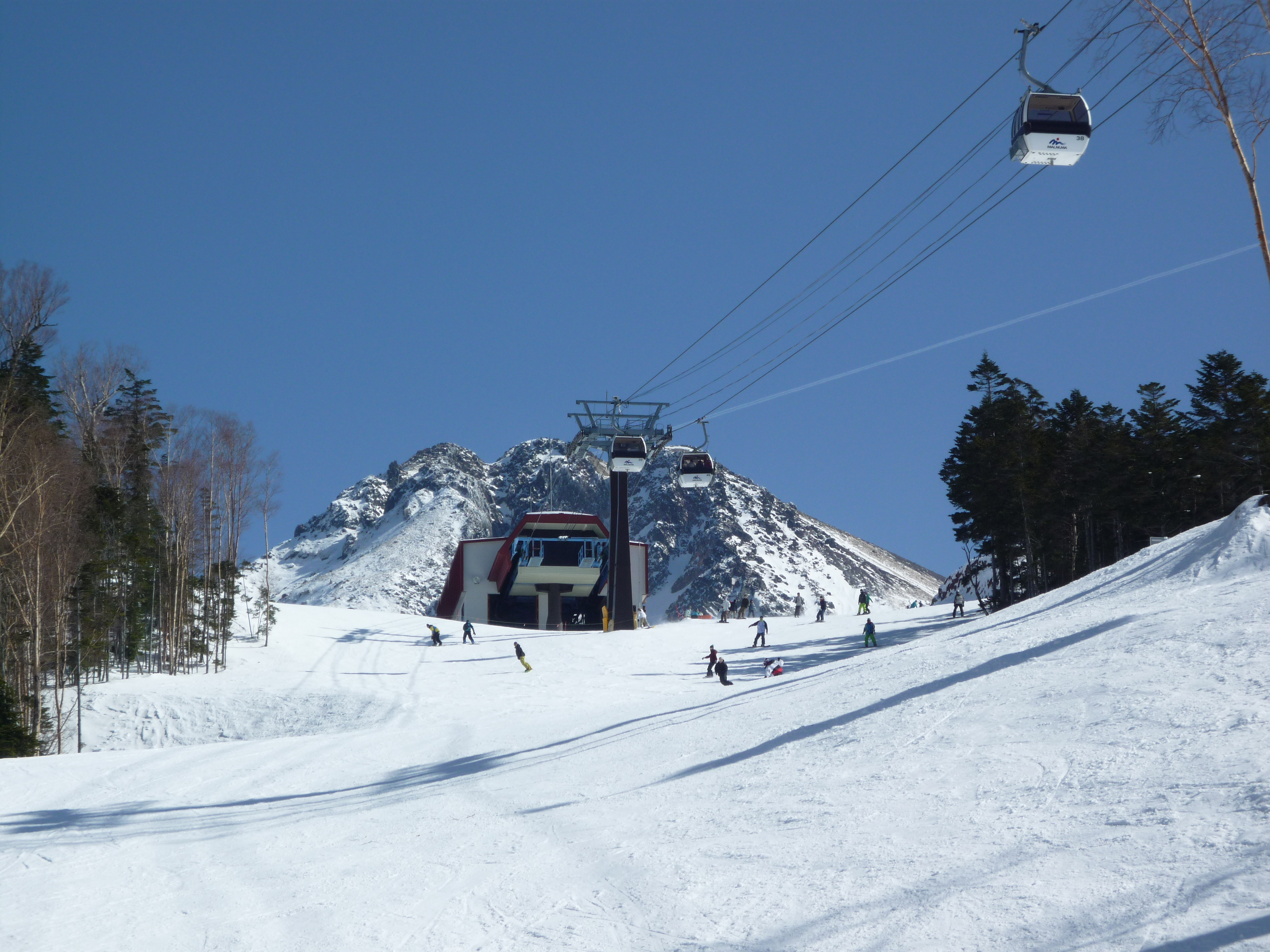
Malnuma Kougen Resort

- Akagiyama Ski Area
- Caetla Ski Resort Oze
- Hotaka Bokujō Ski Area
- Katashina Kōgen Ski Area
- Kawaba Ski Area
- Kazawa Snow Area
- Kusatsu Kokusai Snow & Spa Resort
- Kusatsu Ongaku no Mori Ski Area
- Malnuma Kōgen Ski Area
- Manza Onsen Ski Resort
- Minakami Hōdaigi Ski Area
- Minakami Kōgen Fujiwara Ski Area
- Minakami Kōgen Ski Area
- Minakami Ōana Ski Area
- Minakami Town Akasawa Ski Area
- Norn Minakami Ski Resort
- Okutone Snow Park
- Omote Manza Snow Park
- Palcall Tsumagoi Ski Area
- President Snow Park Karuizawa
- Shiki no Mori White World Oze Iwakura
- Snow Par Ogna Hotaka
- Snow Park Oze Tokura
- Tanbara Ski Park
- Tanigawa Onsen White Valley Ski Area
- Tanigawadake Tenjindaira Ski Area

=== Saitama Prefecture ===
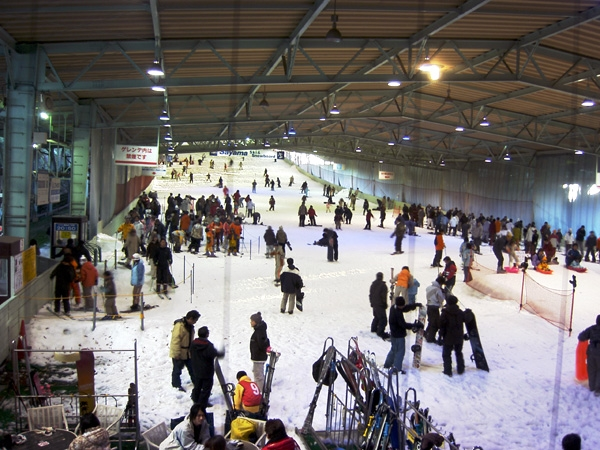
Sayama Ski & Snowboard

- Sayama Ski Resort (indoor skiing facilities only)

=== Kanagawa Prefecture ===
- Snova Mizonokuchi (Indoor)
- Snova Shinyokohama (Indoor)

== Chūbu region ==
=== Niigata Prefecture ===
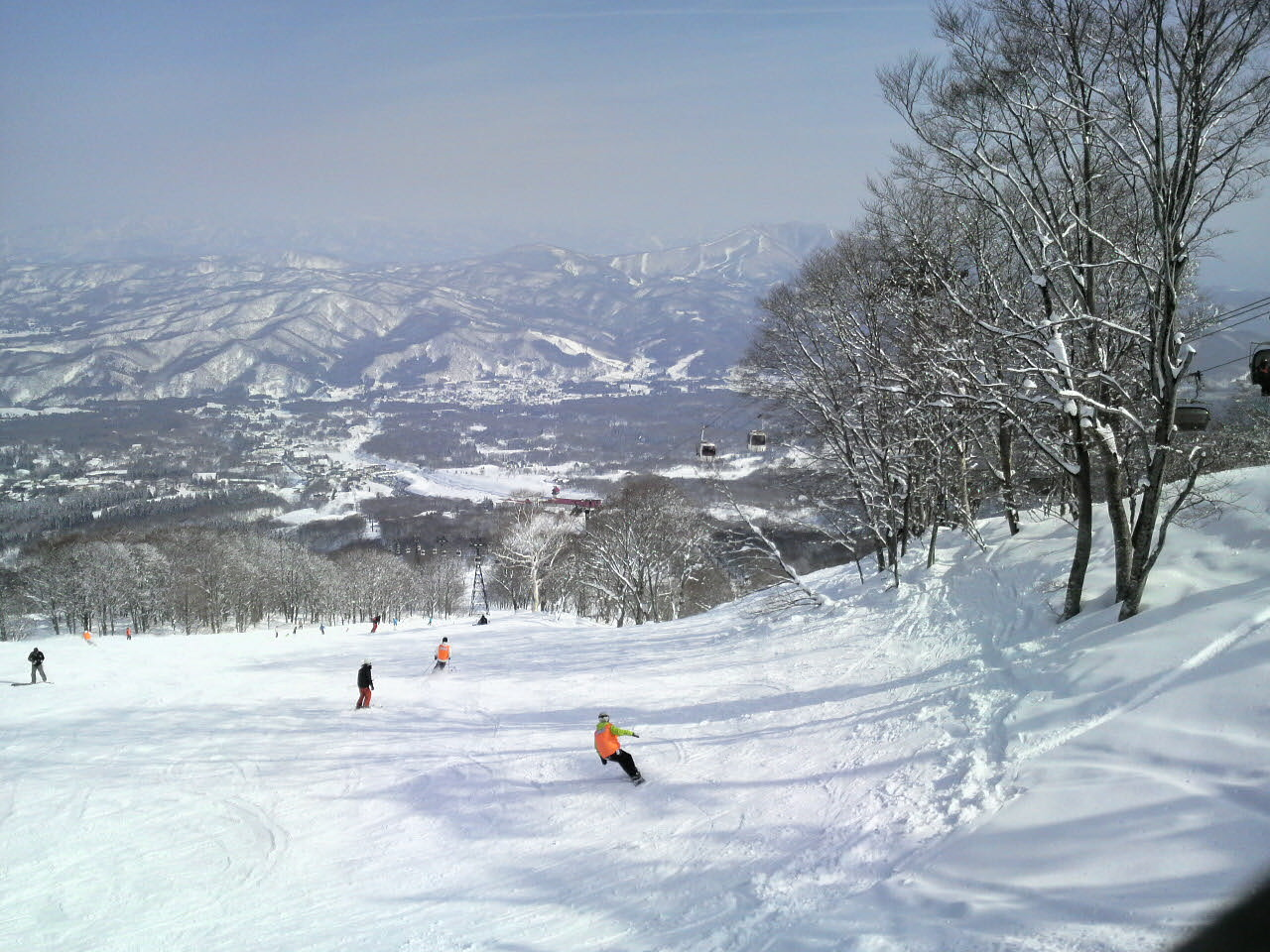
Akakura Onsen Ski Area

- Arai Funaokayama Ski Area (closed)
- Arai Mountain Resort & Spa (closed April 2006, re-opened Dec 2017)
- Axiom Ski Area
- Budō Ski Area
- Centleisure Maiko Snow Resort
- Charmant Hiuchi Ski Resort
- Chateau Shiosawa Ski Area
- Cupid Valley (New Owners 2020/21)
- First Ishiuchi Ski Area
- Fuyudorigoe Ski Garden
- Gala Yuzawa Snow Resort
- Garuru Takayanagi Ski Area
- Hakkai Sanroku Ski Area
- Ipponsugi Ski Area
- Ishiuchi Hanaoka Ski Area
- Ishiuchi Maruyama Ski Area
- Itoigawa Seaside Valley Ski Areas
- Itsukamachi Ski Area
- Iwa-ppara Ski Area
- Jōetsu Kokusai Ski Resort
- Kakumanji Ski Area
- Kanai Town Taira Ski Area
- Kanayayama Ski Area
- Kan'etsu Kokusai Ōhara Ski Area
- Kawaguchi Ski Area
- Kayama Captain Coast Ski Area
- Kiyokawa Kōgen Ski Area
- Koide Ski Area
- Kokusetsu Tainai Ski Area
- Koshi Kōgen Ski Area
- Ludens Yuzawa Ski Resort
- Matsunoyama Onsen Ski Area
- Mikawa Onsen Ski Area
- Mountain Park Tsunan Ski Area
- Mt. Grand View Ski Area

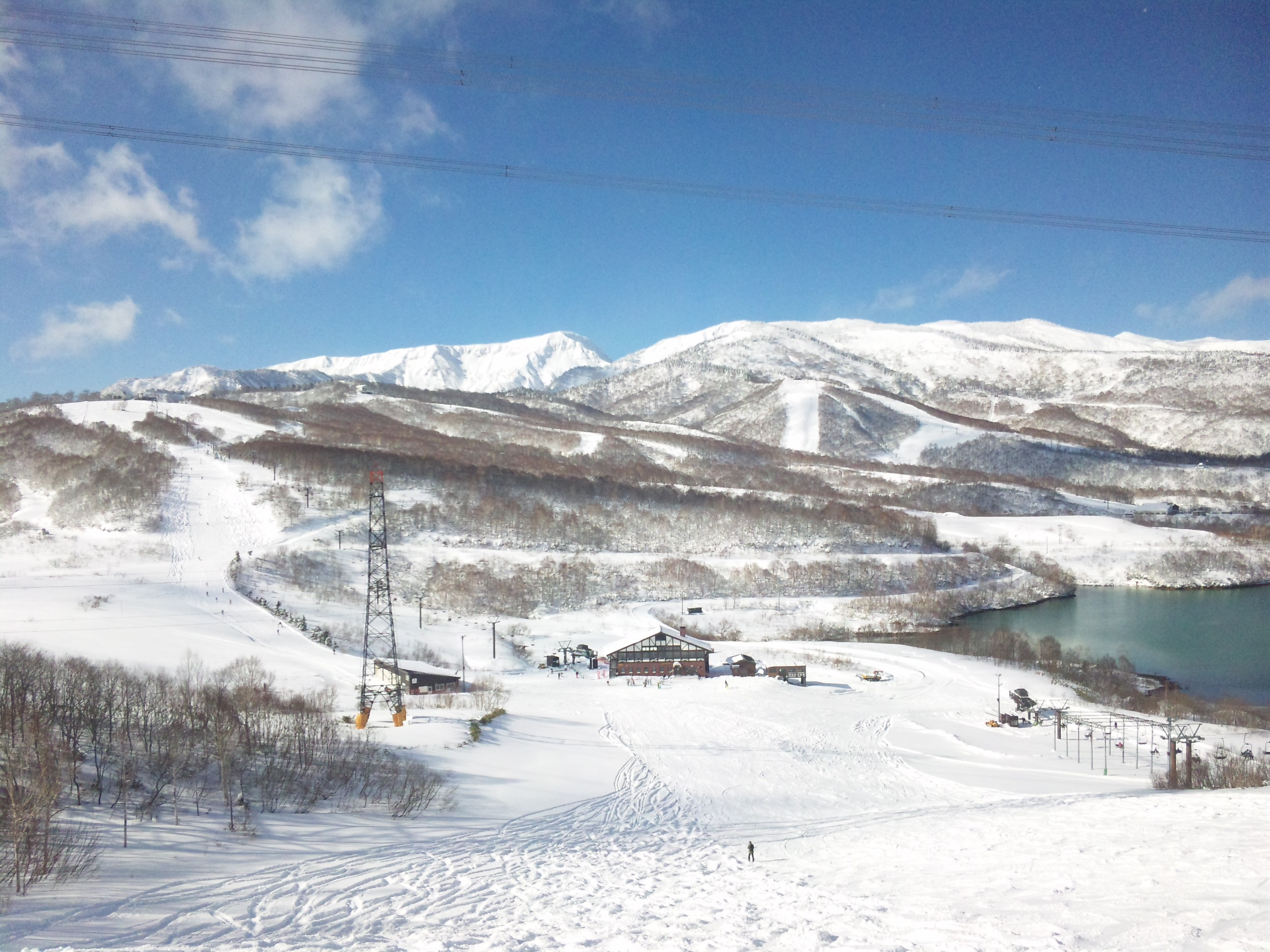
Kagura Ski Resort

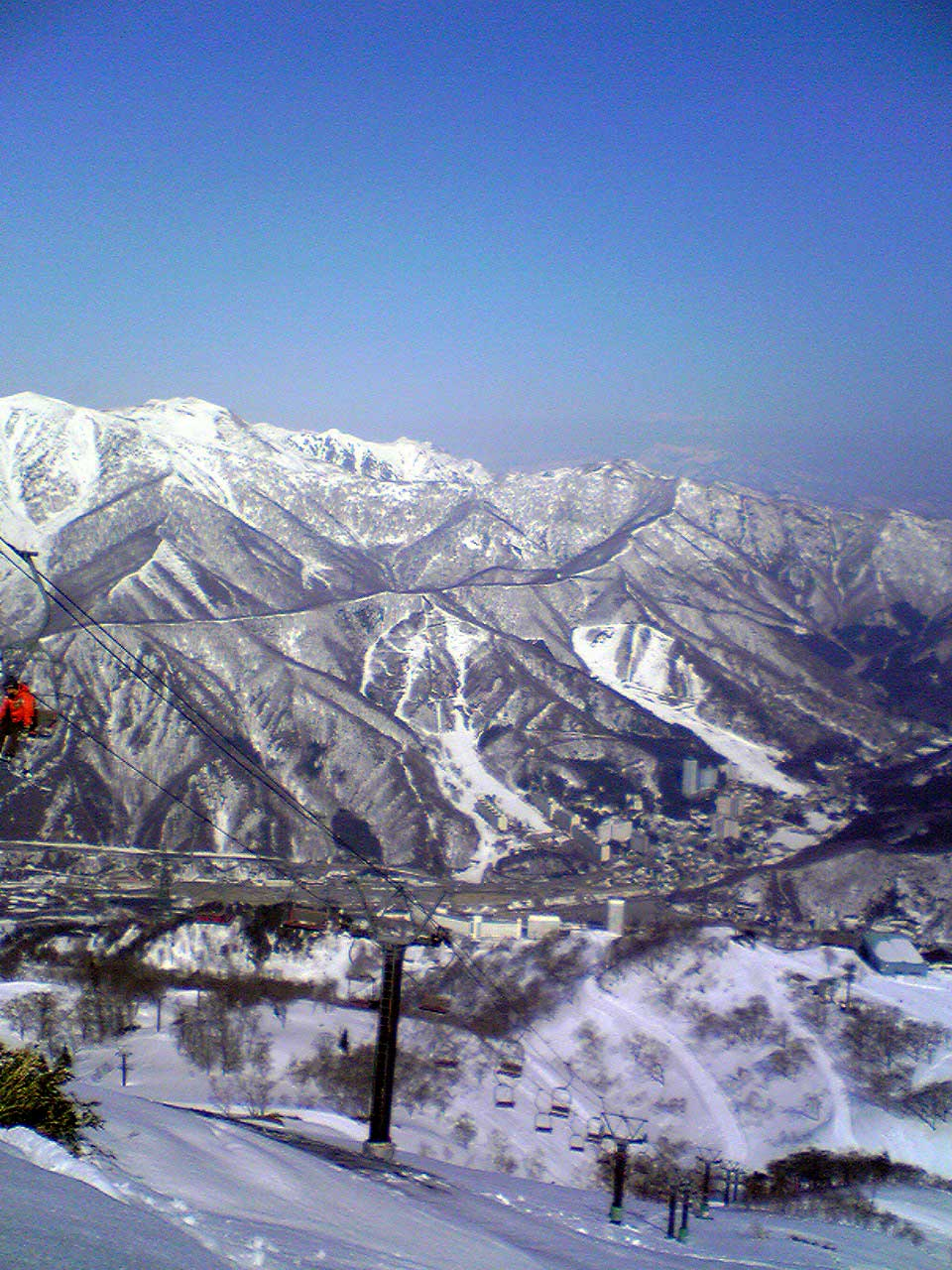
Naeba Ski Resort

- Mt. Naeba
  - Kagura Ski Resort
  - Naeba Ski Resort – With the longest aerial lift in Japan, 5.5 kilometres (3.4 mi).
- Muikamachi Hakkaisan Ski Area
- Muikamachi Minami Ski Area
- Myōkōkogen Ski Resorts - includes ski areas in both Niigata and Nagano
  - (in Niigata)
  - Akakura Kankō Resort Ski Area
  - Akakura Onsen Ski Area – The oldest ski resort in Japan, from 1937.
  - APA Resort Myōkō Pine Valley (Closed 2009)
  - Ikenotaira Onsen Ski Area
  - Kyukamura Ski Area
  - Seki Onsen Ski Area
  - Myōkō Ski Park
  - Panorama Park Ski Area (Closed 1996)
  - Suginohara Ski Area – Possesses the longest run in Japan (8.5 km)
  - Tsubame Onsen Ski Area (shut down)
  - (in Nagano)
  - Kurohime Kōgen Snow Park
  - Madarao Kōgen Ski Area
  - Madarao Kōgen Sympathique Ski Area (Closed 2018)
  - Madarao Kōgen Toyota Ski Area (Closed 2015)
  - Tangram Ski Circus
- Nagaoka City Ski Area
- Nagaoka Country Club Ski Area
- Nakajō Katsura Ski Area
- Nakajō Town Ski Area
- Nakamine Ski Area
- Nakasato Kiyotsu Ski Area
- Nakasato Snow Wood Ski Area
- Naspa Ski Garden
- National Park Resort Villages Myōkō Ski Area
- New Greenpia Tsunan Ski Area
- Ninohji Snow Park Ninox
- Ojiya Ski Area
- Oku Tadami Maruyama Ski Area
- Ōyu Onsen Ski Area
- Pine Ridge Resorts Kandatsu Ski Area
- Sportscom Urasa Kokusai Ski Area
- Sugihara Ski Area
- Tainai Ski Area (Closed 2020)
- Tochio Family Ski Area
- Tōkamachi City Matsudai Family Ski Area
- Tōkamachi City Ski Area
- Tsunogami Ski Area
- Ugawa Ski Area
- Uonuma City Ōhara Ski Area
- Urasa Ski Area
- Wakabuna Kōgen Ski Area
- Wonder Valley Sado Ski Area
- Yakeyama Onsen Ski Area
- Yakushi Ski Area
- Yasuda Town Ski Area
- Yoshikawa Rokkakuyama Ski Area
- Yūkyūzan Ski Area
- Yuzawa Kōgen Ski Area
- Yuzawa Nakazato Ski Area
- Yuzawa Park Ski Area

=== Toyama Prefecture ===
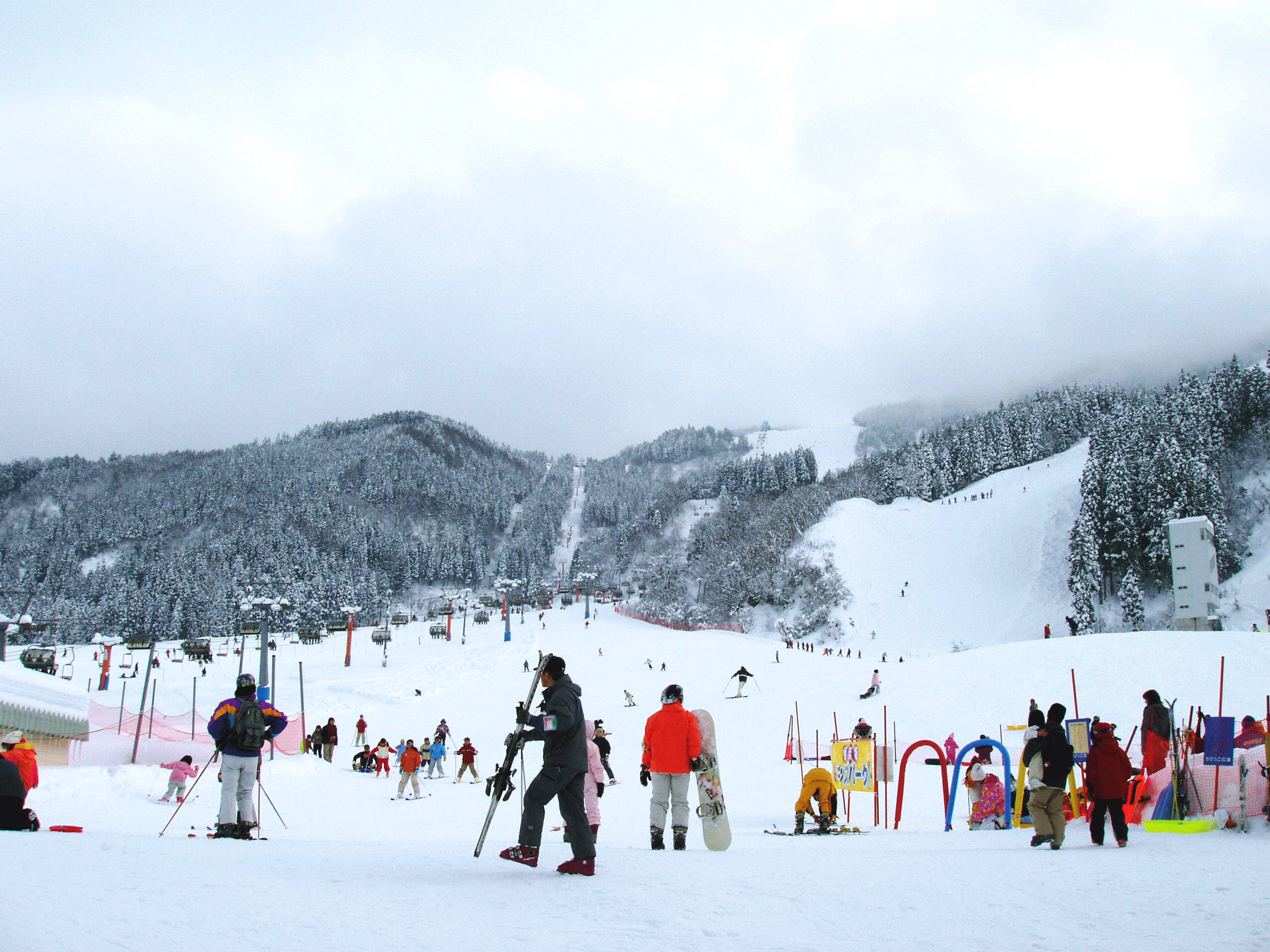
Tateyama Sanroku Ski Area Gokurakuzaka Area

- IOX-AROSA Ski Resort
- Kanjōji Ski Area
- Sarukurayama Ski Area
- Snow Valley Toga
- Taira Ski Area
- Takanbō Ski Area
- Tateyama Sangaku Ski Area
- Tateyama Sanroku Ski Area
  - Awasuno Ski Area
  - Gokurakuzaka Area
  - Raichō Valley Area
- Unazuki Onsen Ski Area
- Ushidake Onsen Ski Area
- Yumenotaira Ski Area

=== Ishikawa Prefecture ===
- Hakusan Chūgū Onsen Ski Area
- Hakusan Ichirino Onsen Ski Area
- Hakusan Seme Kōgen Ski Area
- Hakusan Shiramine Onsen Ski Area
- Iōzen Ski Area
- Kanazawa Seymour Ski Area
- Kurokawa Onsen Ski Area
- Nanao Korosa Ski Area
- Nishiyama Cross-Country Ski Area
- Ōkuradake Kōgen Ski Area
- Shishiku Kōgen Ski Area
- Torigoe Kōgen Dainichi Ski Area
- Wajima City Mitsui Ski Area

=== Fukui Prefecture ===
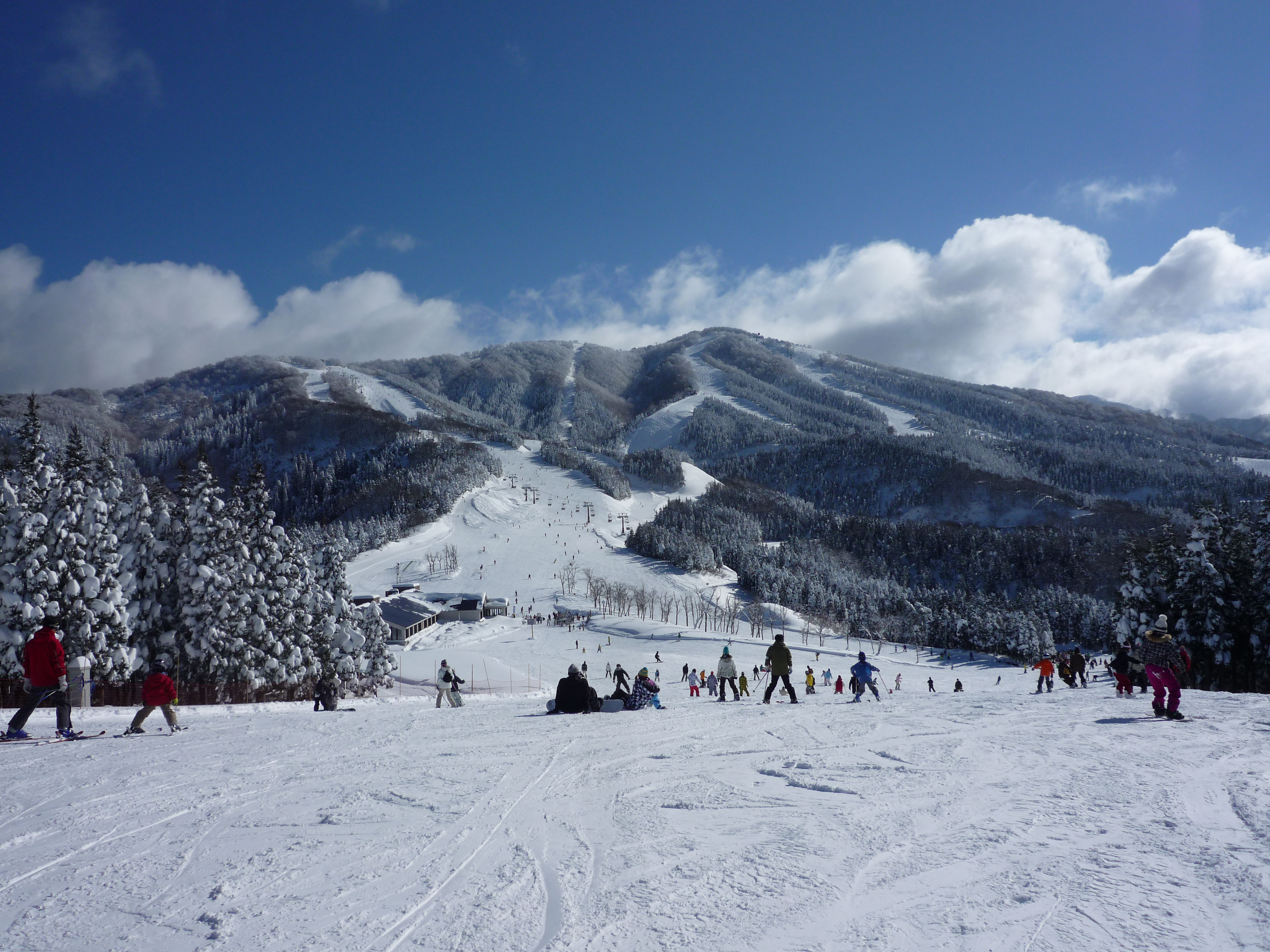
Ski Jam Katsuyama

- Fukui Izumi Ski Area
- Imajō 365
- Kadohara Ski Area
- Karigahara Ski Area
- Kuzuryū Ski Area
- Rokuroshi Kōgen Ski Area
- Ski Jam Katsuyama

=== Shizuoka Prefecture ===
- Ōkubo Grass Ski Area
- River Well Ikawa Ski Area
- Snow Town Yeti

=== Yamanashi Prefecture ===
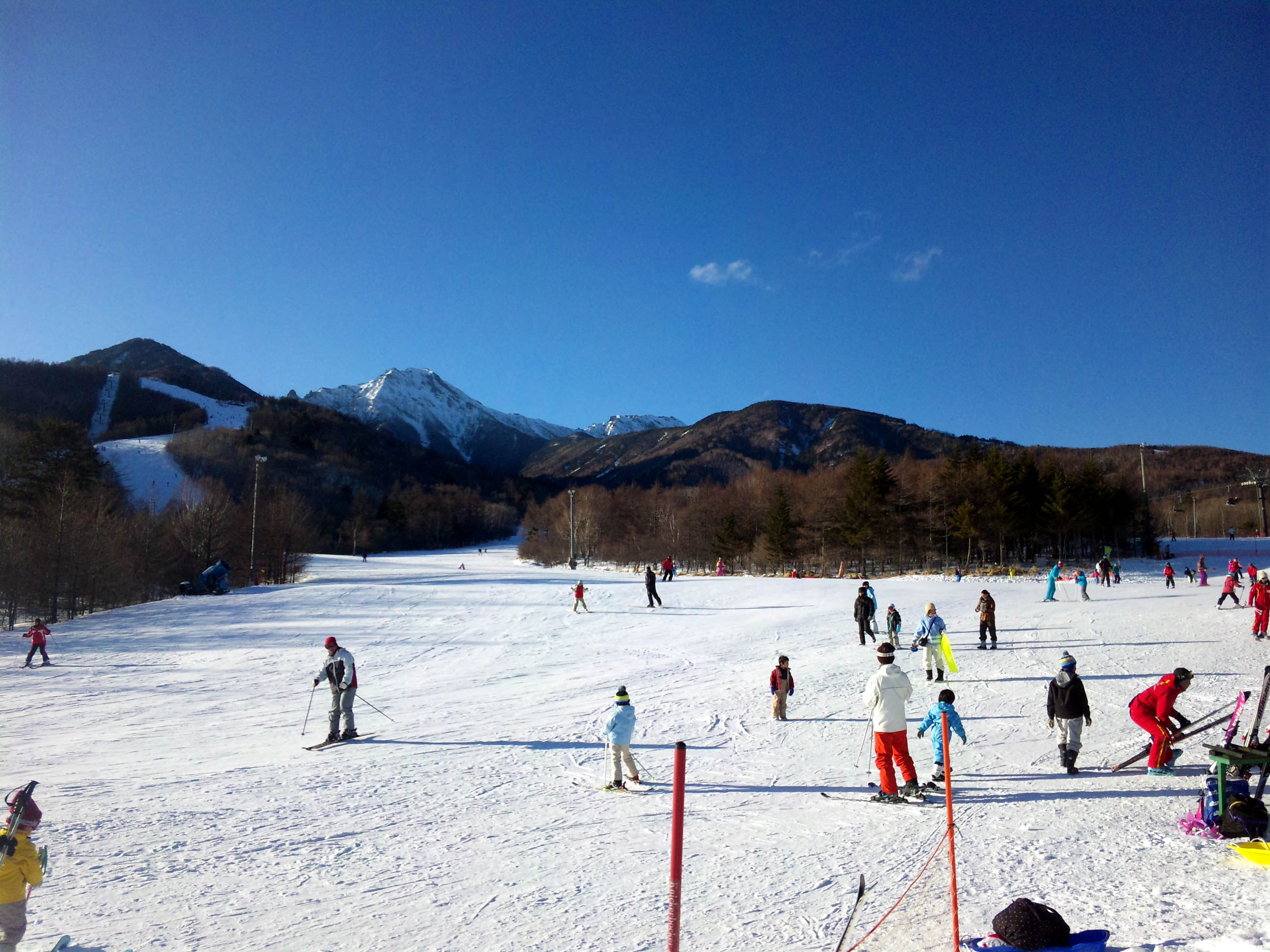
Sun Meadows Ōizumi Kiyosato Ski Area

- Fujiten Snow Resort
- Kamui Misaka Ski Area
- Sun Meadows Ōizumi Kiyosato Ski Area

=== Nagano Prefecture ===
- Araragi Kōgen Ski Area
- Asahi Prime Ski Area
- Asama 2000 Park
- Banshogahara Ski Area
- Blanche Takayama Ski Resort
- Chateraise Ski Resort Yatsugadake
- Chūō-dō Ina Ski Resort
- Echo Valley Ski Area
- Fujimi Kōgen Ski Area
- Fujimi Panorama Resort

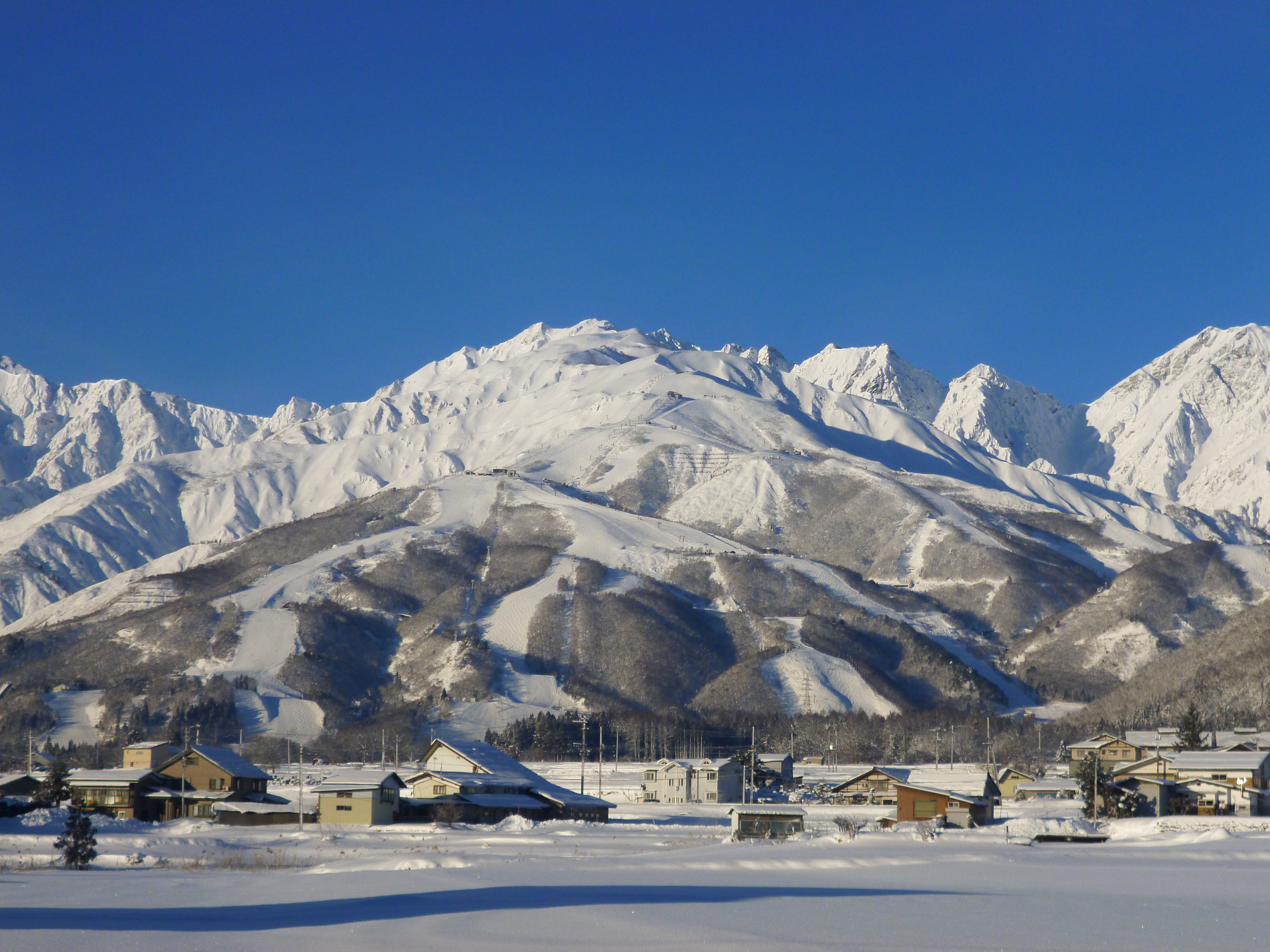
Hakuba Happo-one Winter Resort

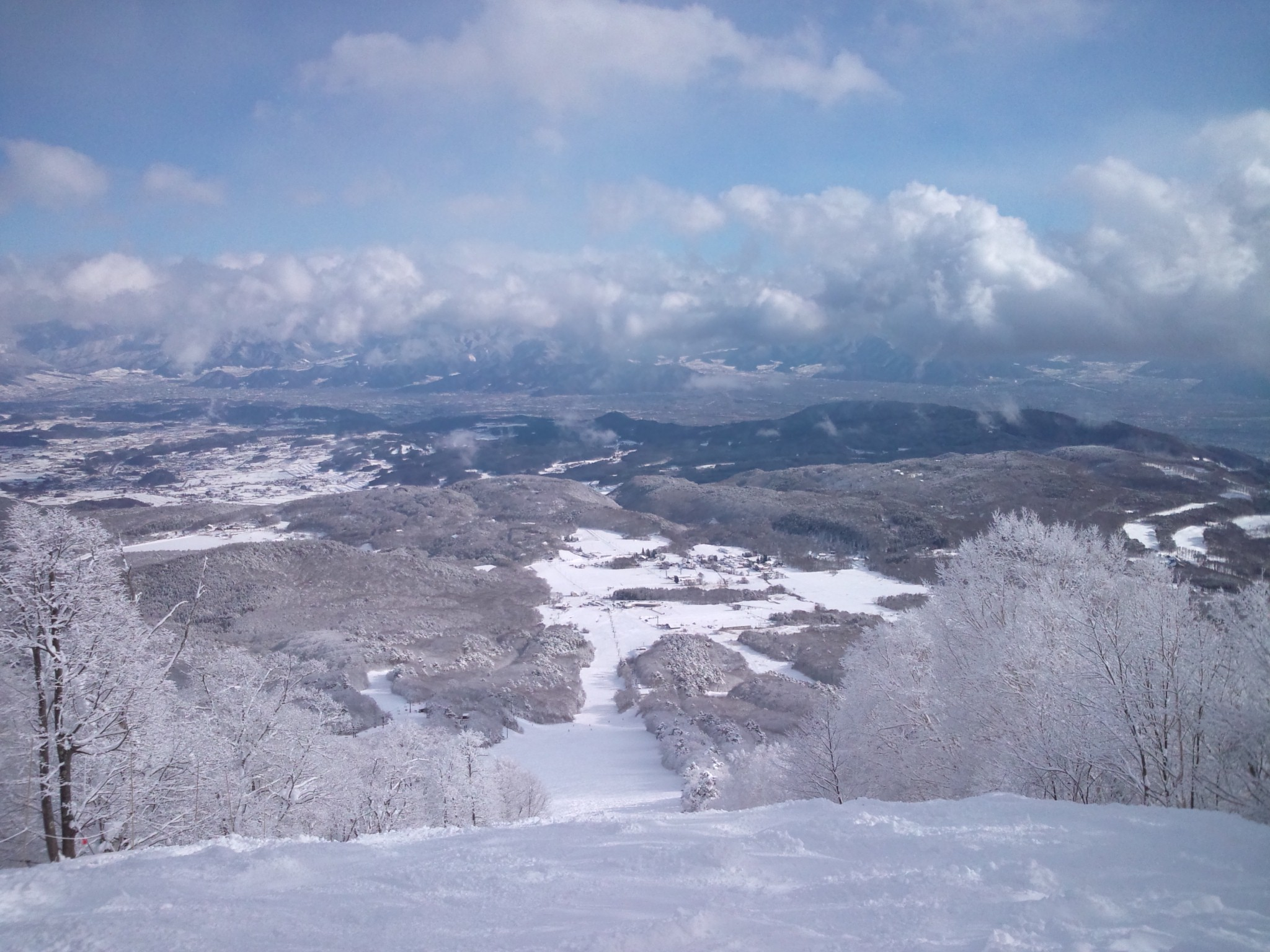
iizuna resort Ski Area

- Hakuba 47 Winter Sports Park
- Hakuba Cortina Kokusai Ski Area
- Hakuba Goryū Ski Resort
- Hakuba Happoone Winter Resort
- Hakuba Highland Ski Area
- Iwatake Ski Area
- Hakuba Minekata Ski Area
- Hakuba Norikura Onsen Ski Area
- Heavens Sonohara Snow World
- Hijiri Kōgen Ski Area
- Hijiriyama Panorama Ski Area
- Hiraya Kōgen Akasaka Ski Area
- Hokuryūko Family Ski Area
- Iizuna Kogen Ski Area (Closed 2020)
- Iizuna Resort Ski Area
- Jibuzaka Kōgen Ski Area
- Jiigatake Ski Area
- Kaida Kōgen MIA Ski Resort
- Karuizawa Skate Center Snowboard Park
- Kirigamine Ski Area
- Kiso Fukushima Ski Area
- Kita Shiga Kōgen Komaruyama Ski Area
- Kita Shiga Kōgen Yomase Onsen Ski Area
- Kita Shiga Takai Fuji Ski Area
- Kita Shinshū Kijimadaira Ski Area

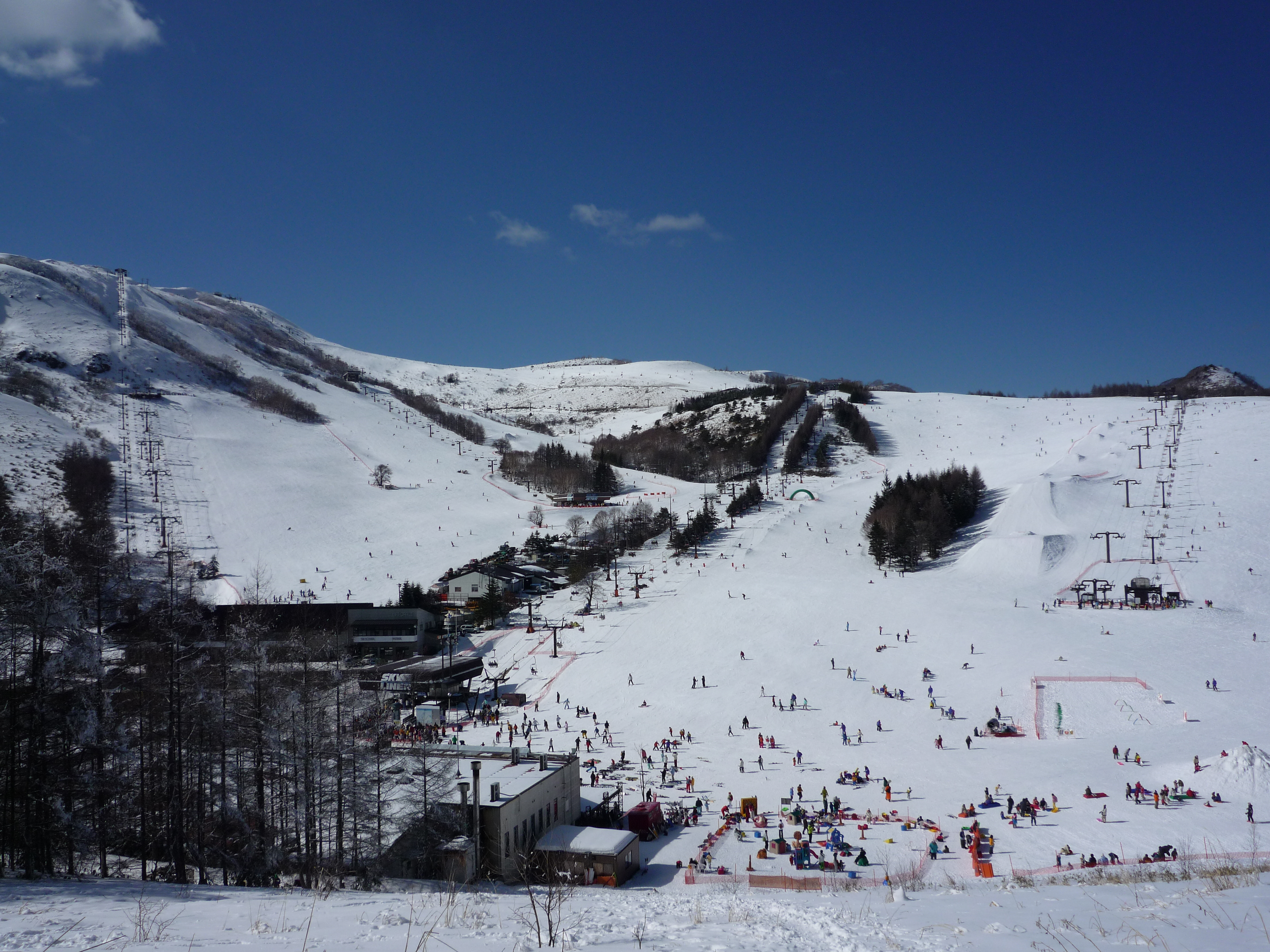
Kurumayama Kōgen Snow Resort

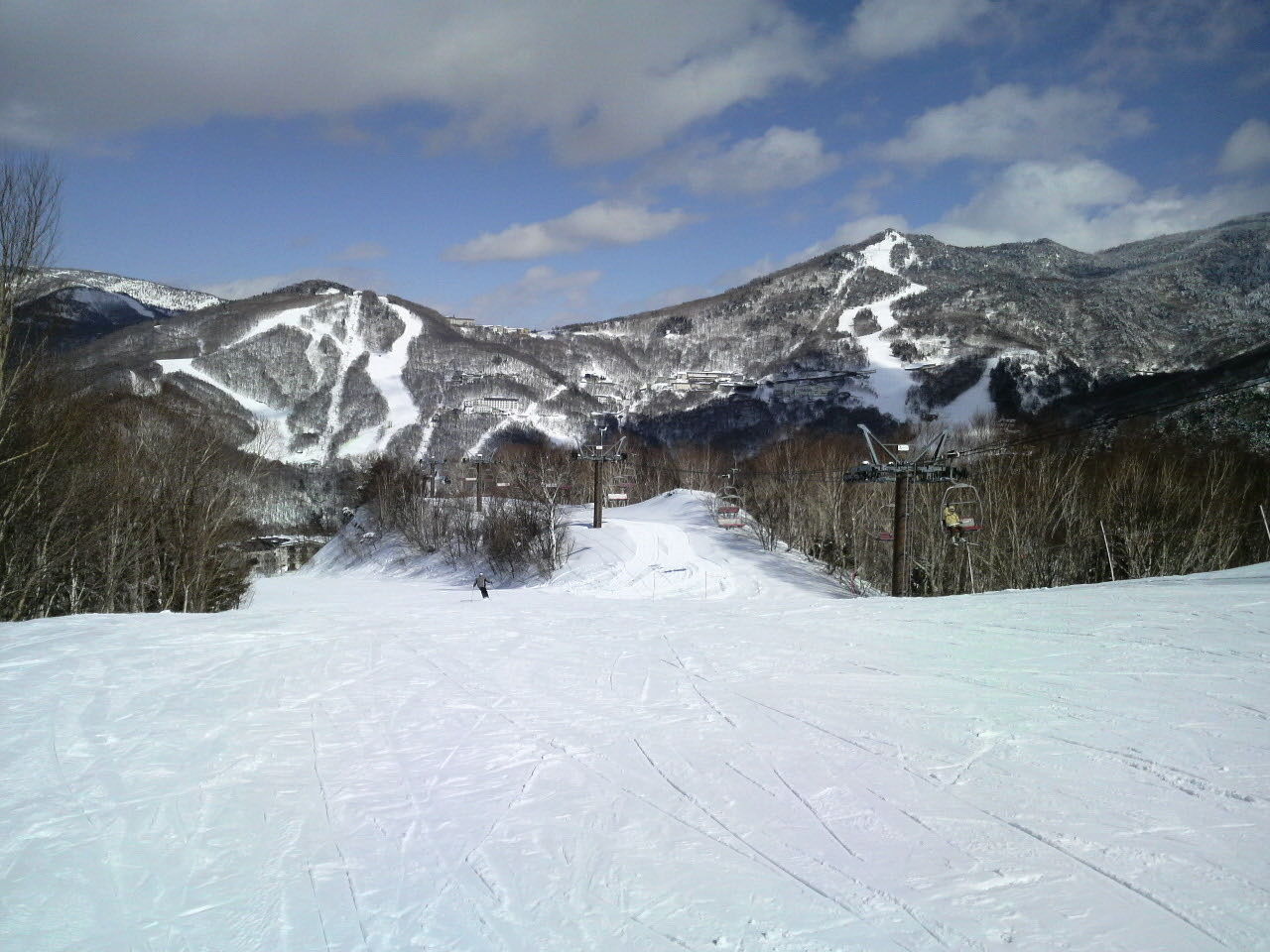
Shiga Kōgen Nishitateyama＆higashidateyama Ski Area

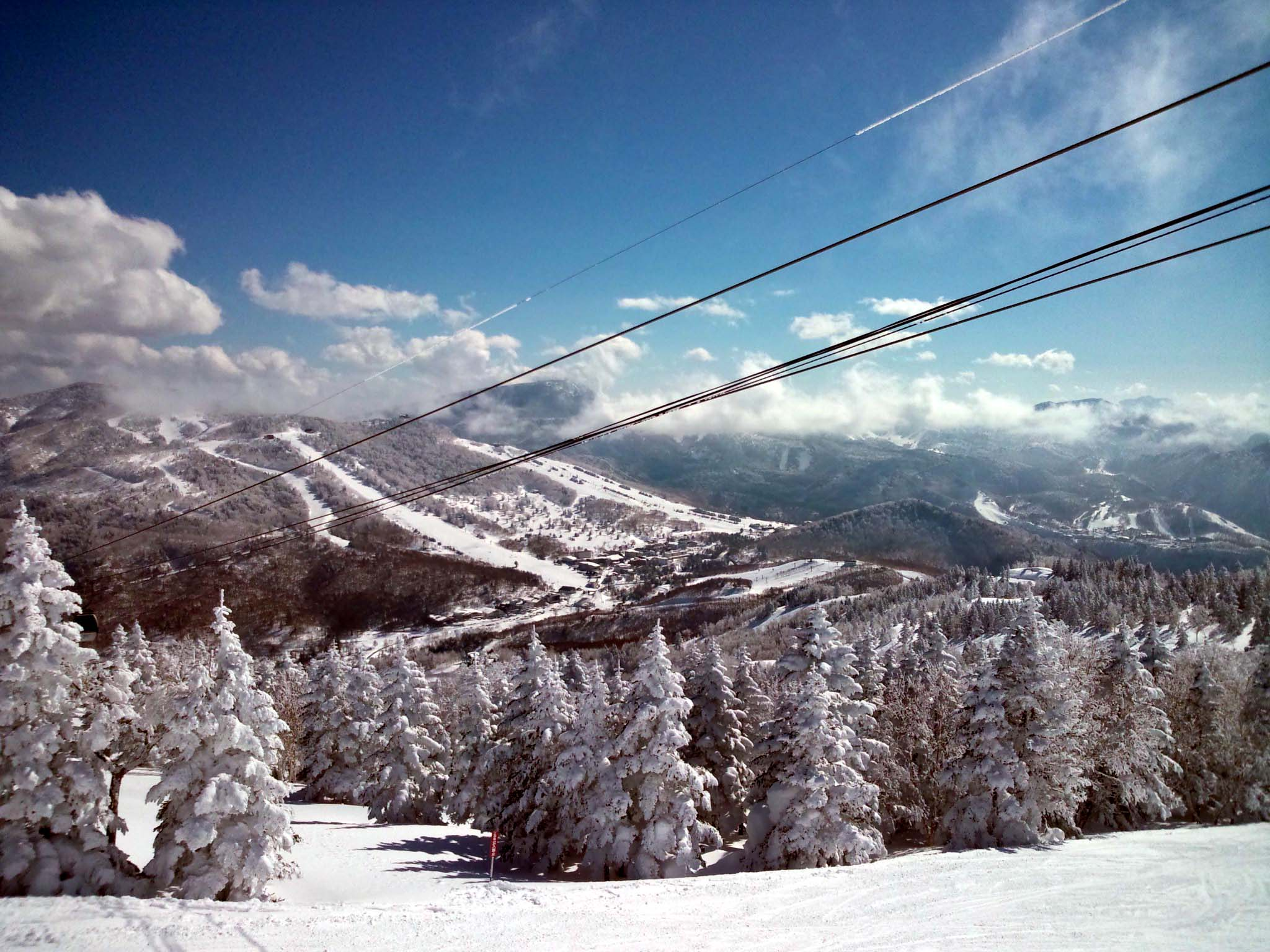
Shiga Kōgen ichinose Ski Area

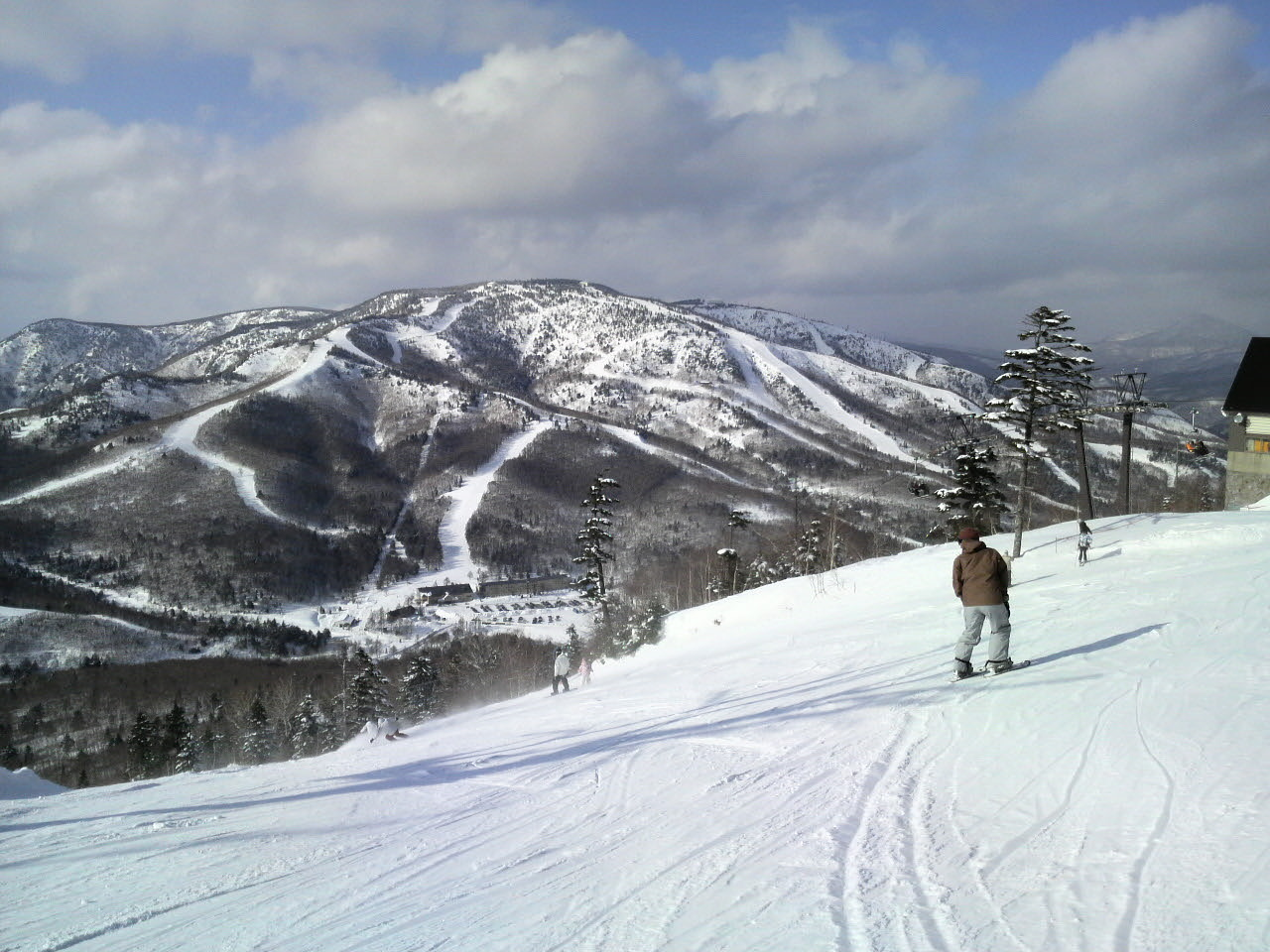
Shiga Kogen Yakebitaiyama Ski Area

Tsugaike Kōgen Ski Area

- Komagane Kōgen Ski Area
- Koumi Ri-Ex Ski Valley
- Kurohime Kōgen Snow Park
- Kurumayama Kōgen Snow Resort
- Madarao Kōgen Ski Area
- Madarao Kōgen Sympathique Ski Area (Closed 2018)
- Madarao Kōgen Toyota Ski Area (Closed 2015)
- Makinoiri Snow Park
- Minenohara Kōgen Ski Area
- Norikura Kōgen Igaya Ski Area
- Norikura Kōgen Snow + Spa Resort
- Nozawa Onsen Snow Resort
- Ōmachi Ski Area
- Ontake Ropeway Ski Area
- Ontake 2240
- Pilatus Tateshina Ski Resort
- Prince Snow Resort Karuizawa
- Racing Camp Nobeyama
- Ryuoo Ski Park
- Sakae Club Ski Area
- Saku Ski Garden Parada
- Senjōjiki Ski Area
- Shiga Kōgen Ski Resort
  - Hasuike / Maruike / Sun Valley area:
    - Giant Ski Area
    - Hasuike Ski Area
    - Maruike Ski Area
    - Sun Valley Ski Area
  - Higashitateyama / Ichinose / Takamagahara area:
    - Higashitateyama Ski Area
    - Ichinose Diamond Ski Area
    - Ichinose Family Ski Area
    - Ichinose Yamanokami Ski Area
    - Nishitateyama Ski Area
    - Takamagahara Mammoth Ski Area
    - Tanne no Mori Okojo Ski Area
    - Terakoya Ski Area
  - Okushiga Kōgen / Yakebitaiyama area:
    - Okushiga Kōgen Ski Area
    - Yakibitaiyama Ski Area
  - Kumanoyu / Shibutōge / Yokoteyama area:
    - Kasadake Ski Area
    - Kidoike Ski Area
    - Kumanoyu Ski Area
    - Maeyama Ski Area
    - Shibutōge Ski Area
    - Yokoteyama Ski Area

Shiga Kōgen is the largest ski resort complex in Japan, 4.25 square kilometres (1.64 sq mi), 85 courses.

- Shinshū Matsumoto Nomugitōge Ski Area
- Shirakaba 2 in 1 Ski Area
- Shirakaba Kōgen Kokusai Ski Area
- Shirakaba Resort Ski Area
- Shirakabako Royal Hill
- Snowboard World Heights
- Sugadaira Kōgen Snow Resort
  - Davos Area
  - Taro Area
  - Pine Beak Area
- Sun Alpina Aokiko Ski Area
- Sun Alpina Hakuba Sanosaka Ski Resort
- Sun Alpina Kashimayari Ski Area
- Tangram Ski Circus
- Tateshina Tōkyū Ski Resort
- Togakushi Snow World
- Togari Onsen Ski Area
- Tsugaike Kōgen Ski Area
- Yabuhara Kōgen Ski Area
- Yachiho Kōgen Ski Resort
- Yamada Bokujō Ski Area
- Yamada Onsen Ski Area
- Yanaba Ski Area
- Yunomaru Ski Area

=== Gifu Prefecture ===
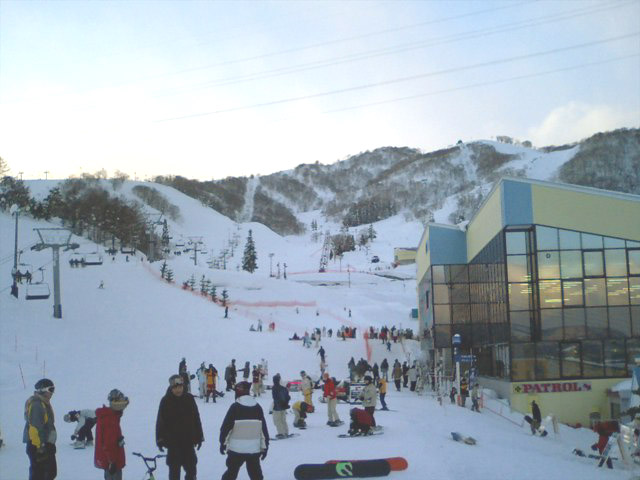
Dynaland

- Ciao Ontake Snow Resort
- Dynaland
- Gujō Kōgen Ski Area
- Harayama City Ski Area
- Hida Funayama Snow Resort Arkopia
- Hida Kawai Ski Area
- Hida Norikura Pentapia Snow World
- Hida Takayama Ski Area
- Hirayu Onsen Ski Area
- Hirugano Kōgen Ski Area
- Hōnokidaira Ski Area
- Ibi Kōgen Ski Area
- Isshiki Kokusai Ski Area
- Itoshiro Charlotte Town
- Kasuga Chōjadaira Ski Area
- Kunimi Takeshi Ski Area
- Meihō Ski Area
- Mont Deus Hida Kuraiyama Snow Park
- Nigorigo Onsen Ski Area
- Outdoor Inn Motai
- Shirakawagō Hirase Onsen Shiroyumi Ski Area
- Shirao Ski Area
- Shōkawa Kōgen Ski Area
- Snova Hashima (Indoor)
- Snow Wave Park Shiratori Kōgen
- Star Spure Ryokufū Resort Hida Nagareha
- Takasu Snow Park
- Washigatake Ski Area
- White Pia Takasu
- Winghills Shirotori Resort
- Youland Sakauchi

=== Aichi Prefecture ===
- Chausuyama Kōgen Ski Area

=== Mie Prefecture ===
- Gozaisho Ski Area

== Kansai region ==
=== Shiga Prefecture ===
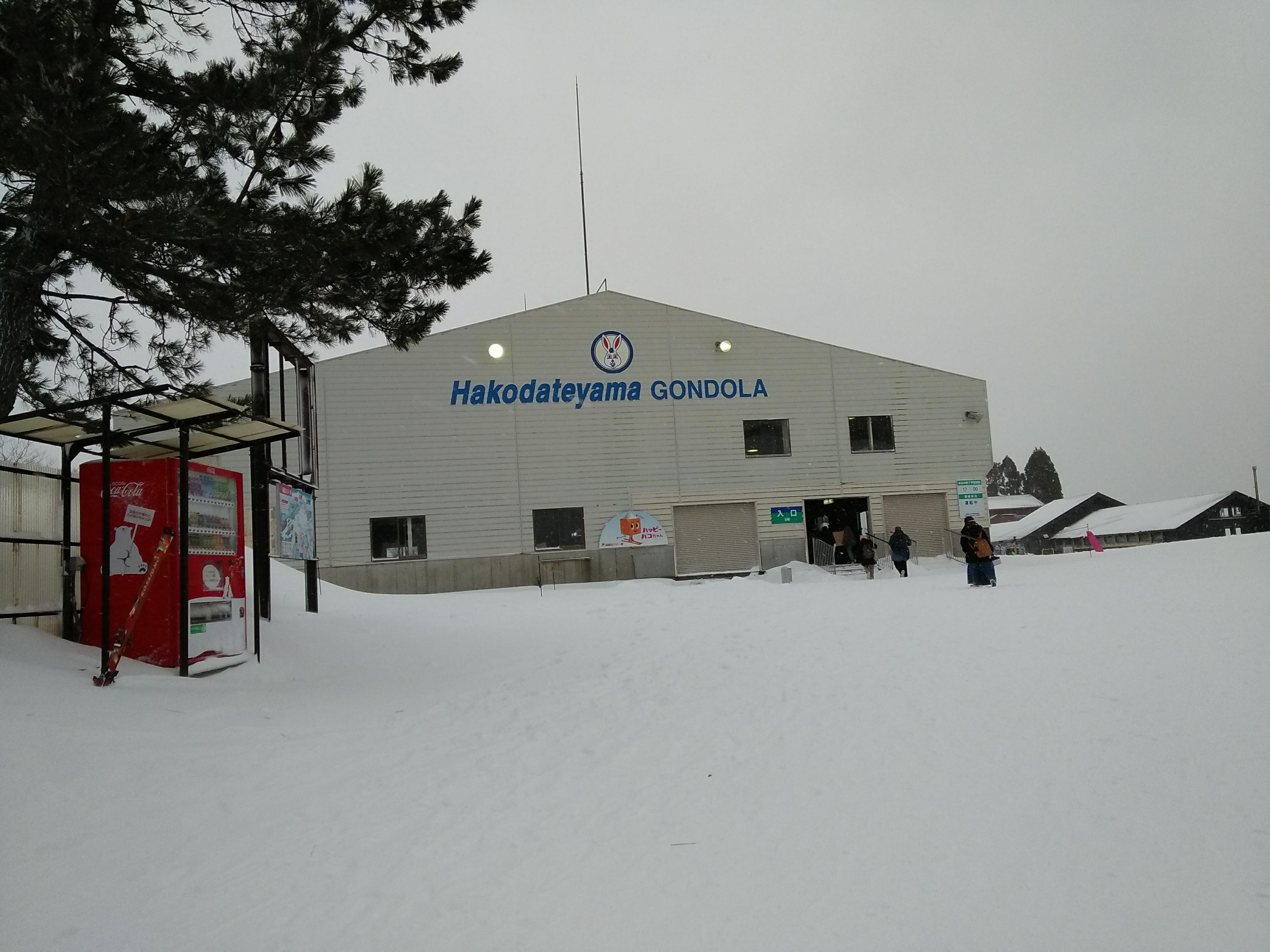
Hakodateyama ski resort, Shiga

- Akagoyama Ski Area
- Berg Yogo
- Biwako Valley
- Hakodateyama Ski Area
- Ibukiyama Ski Area
- Kunizakai Ski Area
- Makino Kōgen Ski Area
- Oku Ibuki Ski Area
- Yogo Kōgen Ski Area

=== Kyōto Prefecture ===
- Kyōto Hirogawara Ski Area
- Ōeyama Ski Area
- Yasakae Town Swiss Village Ski Area

=== Hyōgo Prefecture ===
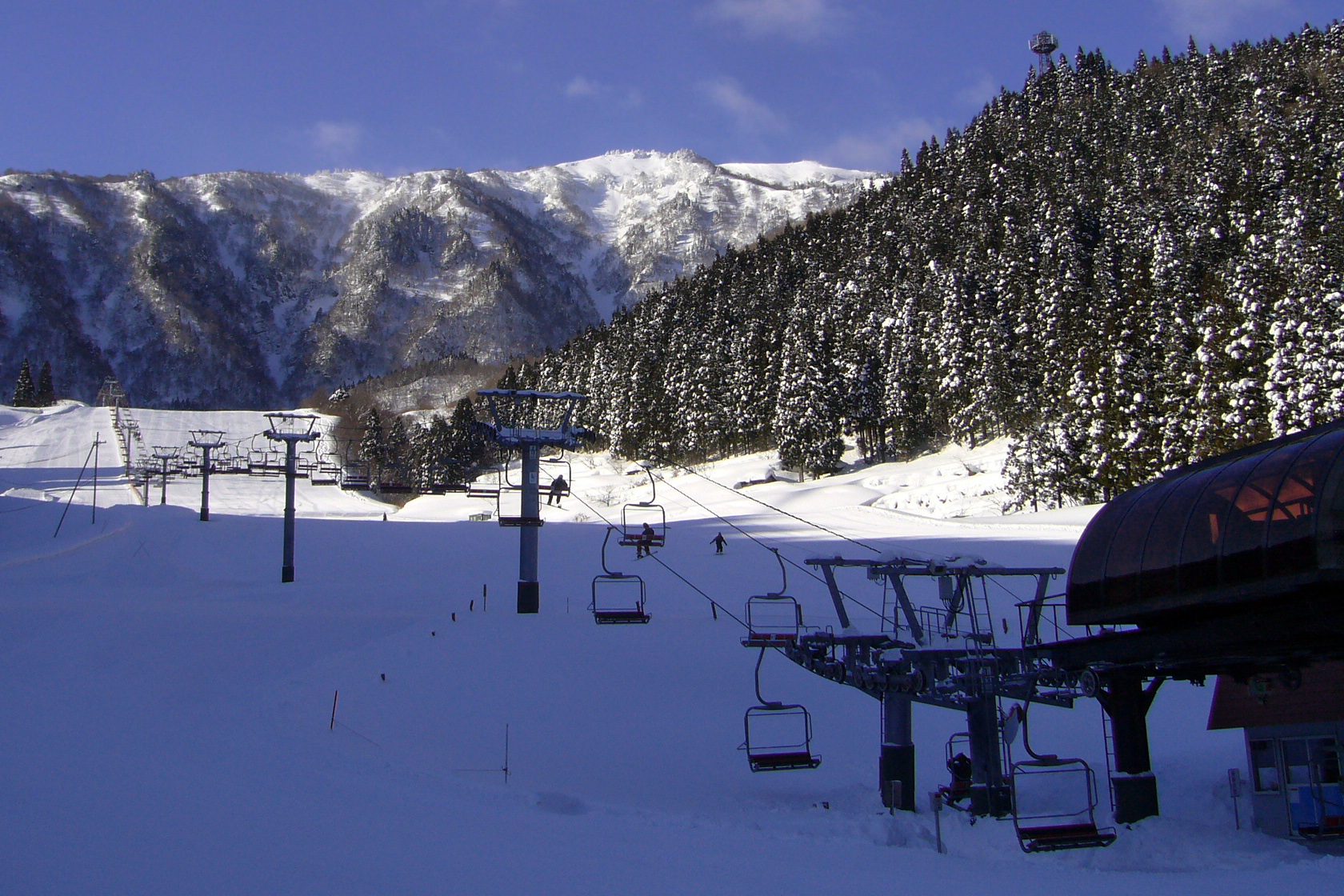
Hyōnosen Kokusai Ski Area

- Banshū Tokura Ski Area
- Chikusa Kōgen Ski Area
- Hachi Kōgen Ski Area
- Hachikita Ski Area
- Hyperbowl Tōhachi
- Hyōnosen Kokusai Ski Area
- Kannabe Kōgen Ski Area
  - Manba Ski Area
  - Nashiki Ski Area
  - Oku Kannabe Ski Area
  - Up Kannabe Ski Area
- Mikata Snow Park
- Mt. Rokkō Artificial Snow Area
- Shin Tokura Ski Area
- Sky Valley Ski Area
- Tajima Bokujō Kōen Ski Area
- Wakasu Kōgen Ōya Ski Area

=== Nara Prefecture ===
- Dorogawa Ski Area
- Myōjintaira Ski Area
- Wasamatayama Ski Area

== Chūgoku region ==
=== Tottori Prefecture ===
- Daisen Ski Area
  - Daisen Kokusai Ski Area
  - Gōenzan Ski Area
  - Nakanohara Ski Area
  - Uenohara Ski Area
- Hanamiyama Ski Area
- Kagamiganaru Ski Area
- Masumizu Kōgen Ski Area
- Oku Daisen Ski Area
- Wakasa Hyōnosen Ski Area

=== Shimane Prefecture ===
- Asahi Tengusuton
- Kotobiki Forest Park
- Miinohara Ski Area
- Mizuho Highland
- Sanbe Onsen Ski Area
- Akana Ski Area

=== Okayama Prefecture ===
- Chiya Ski Area
- Hiruzen Bear Valley Ski Area
- Ibuki no Sato Ski Area
- Onbara Kōgen Ski Area

=== Hiroshima Prefecture ===
- Azumayama Ski Area
- Dōgoyama Kōgen Ski Area
- Geihoku Bunka Land
- Hiroshima Kenmin no Mori
- Megahira Onsen Megahira
- Ōsa Ski Area
- Osorakan Ski Area
- Pine Ridge Resorts Geihoku
- Ringo Kyōwakoku Ski Area
- Ski Park Kanbiki
- Snow Resort Nekoyama
- Utopia Saioto
- Yawata Kōgen 191

=== Yamaguchi Prefecture ===
- Tokusagamine Ski Area
- Rakanzan Highland

== Shikoku region ==
=== Kagawa Prefecture ===
- Snow Park Unpenji

=== Tokushima Prefecture ===
- Ikawa Ski Area Kainayama
- Kenzan Ski Area

=== Ehime Prefecture ===
- Across Shigenobu (Indoor)
- Ishizuchi Ski Area
- Kuma Ski Land
- Mikawa Ski Area
- Salega Land Plana
- Sol-Fa Oda Ski Gelände

=== Kōchi Prefecture ===
- Tengu Kōgen Ski Area

== Kyūshū region ==
=== Fukuoka Prefecture ===
- Big Air Fukuoka (Indoor)

=== Saga Prefecture ===
- Tenzan Ski Resort

=== Ōita Prefecture ===
- Kujū Shinrin Kōen Ski Area

=== Miyazaki Prefecture ===
- Gokase Highland Ski Area

== See also ==
- List of ski areas and resorts
