= Mashike Mountains =

Group of mountains in the country of Japan

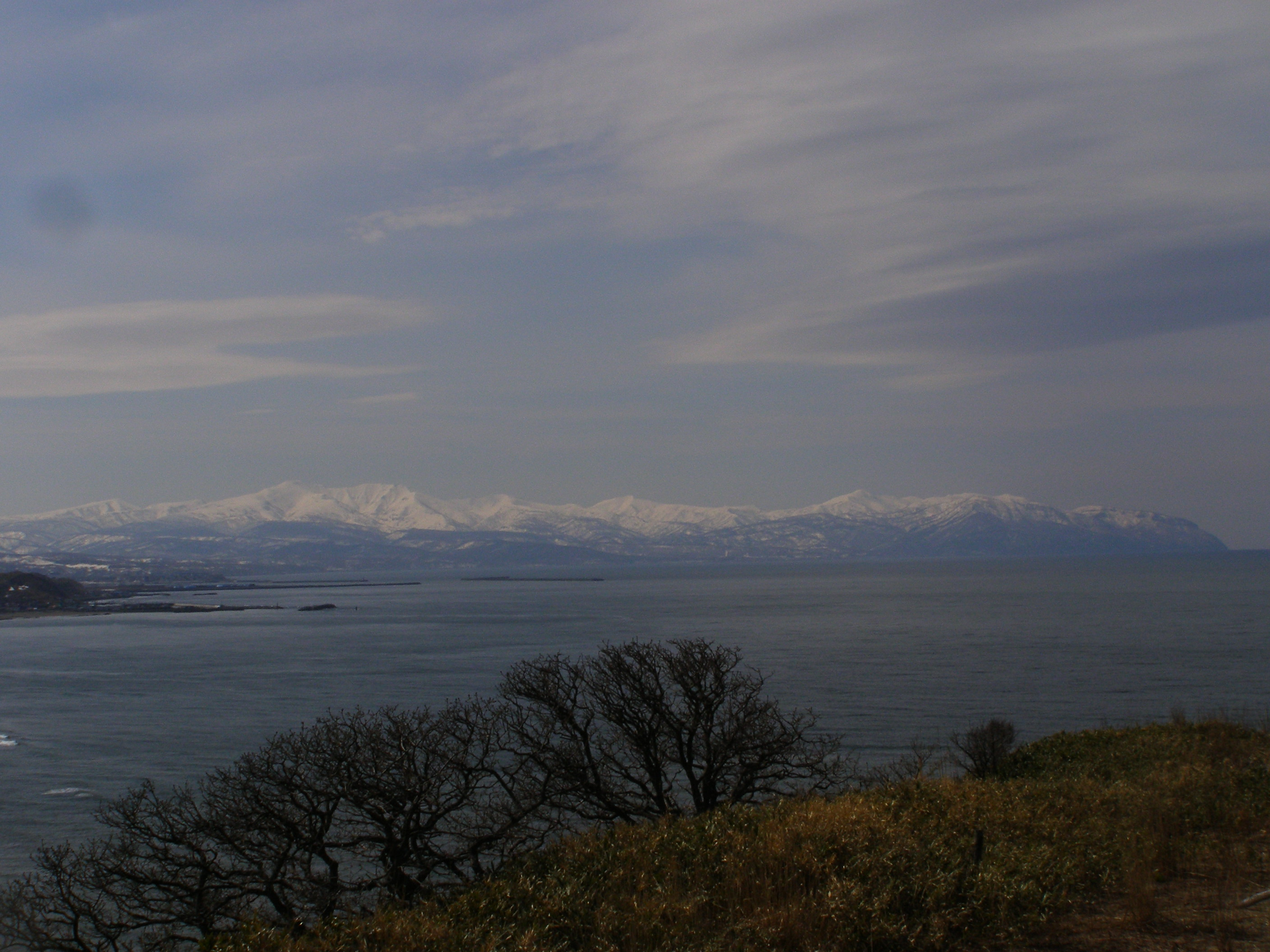
- View from Obira (April 2009)

Highest point
- Peak: Mount Shokanbetsu, Mashike and Shintotsukawa, Rumoi and Sorachi Subprefecture, Japan
- Elevation: 1,491.6 m (4,894 ft)
- Coordinates: 43°42′57″N 141°31′23″E

Naming
- Native name: 増毛山地 (Japanese)

Geography
- Country: Japan
- State: Hokkaidō
- Regions: Ishikari, Rumoi and Sorachi
- Subdivisions: Kabato Mountains and Shokanbetsudake Mountains
- Biome: alpine climate

Geology
- Orogeny: island arc
- Rock type(s): Volcanic and fold

Mashike Mountains (増毛山地, Mashike Sanchi) are a group of mountains on the western coast of Hokkaidō. The mountain range is divided into two regions by the Hamamasu River. The northern region is a group of volcanic mountains called Shokanbetsudake Mountains. The southern region is known as the Kabato Mountains. The Mashike mountains lie between the Teshio Mountains to the north and the Ishikari Plain to the south. Mashikie mountains includes part of Shokanbetsu-Teuri-Yagishiri Quasi-National Park.

The highest peak of the Mashike mountains is Mount Shokanbetsu (1492m).

Mount Minami Shokan, Mount Kunbetsu and Mount Etai define a triangle that surrounds the Uryū Wetlands (雨竜沼湿原, Uryūnumashitsugen).

== Flora and fauna ==
Unlike on Honshū, you can see alpine plants at altitudes as low as 1000 meters in the Mashike mountains.
