= Anja Bolbjerg =

Danish freestyle skier

Personal information
- Born: 18 May 1971 (age 53); Gentofte, Denmark
- Height: 165 cm (5 ft 5 in)
- Weight: 60 kg (132 lb)

Sport
- Country: Denmark
- Sport: Freestyle skiing

Anja Bolbjerg (born 18 May 1971) is a Danish freestyle skier.

She was born in Gentofte. She competed at the 1998 Winter Olympics, in women's moguls. She also competed at the 2002 Winter Olympics.

Bolbjerg had nine appearances in six FIS Freestyle World Ski Championships between 1993 and 2003. She competed at the FIS Freestyle World Ski Championships 1993 in Altenmarkt-Zauchensee, where she placed 30th in moguls. At the FIS Freestyle World Ski Championships 1995 in La Clusaz she placed 23rd, and at the FIS Freestyle World Ski Championships 1997 in Iizuna kogen, Nagano, she placed 20th in moguls. At the FIS Freestyle World Ski Championships 1999 in Meiringen-Hasliberg she placed ninth in moguls and 17th in dual moguls. She competed at the FIS Freestyle World Ski Championships 2001 in Whistler, finishing 35th in moguls, and 17th in dual moguls. Her last world championships were the FIS Freestyle World Ski Championships 2003 in Deer Valley, where she placed 19th in the moguls final, and 17th in dual moguls.

Her best achievements in the FIS Freestyle Ski World Cup is a victory in moguls in La Plagne in December 1997, and a second place in moguls in Tandadalen in November 1999. She took part in twelve world cup seasons, from the 1992–93 World Cup to the 2003–04 World Cup.
