= Pelchat =

Pelchat is a French surname. Notable people with the surname include:

- Ann-Marie Pelchat (born 1974), Canadian freestyle skier
- Christiane Pelchat (born 1959), Canadian politician
- Juliette Pelchat (born 2004), Canadian snowboarder
- Marc Pelchat (born 1967), American speed skater
- Mario Pelchat (born 1964), Canadian Francophone singer from Quebec
- Zoé Pelchat, Canadian film and television director from Quebec
