= Mount Okutoppu =

Mountain in the country of Japan

- 奥徳富岳
- Location within Japan

Highest point
- Elevation: 1,346 m (4,416 ft)
- Prominence: 181 m (594 ft)
- Parent peak: Mount Kunbetsu
- Listing: List of mountains and hills of Japan by height
- Coordinates: 43°40′37″N 141°30′27″E

Naming
- Language of name: Japanese

Geography
- Location: Hokkaidō, Japan
- Parent range: Shokanbetsudake Mountains
- Topo map(s): Geospatial Information Authority 25000:1 暑寒別岳; 50000:1 留萌

Geology
- Rock age: Late Miocene to Early Pliocene
- Mountain type: volcanic

Mount Okutoppu (奥徳富岳, Okutoppu-dake) is a mountain of the Shokanbetsudake Mountains. It is located on the border between Shintotsukawa and Ishikari, Hokkaidō, Japan. The mountain is also known as Mount Oshirarika (尾白利加山, Oshirarika-san).

== Geology ==
Mount Okutoppu is made from non-alkaline mafic volcanic rock.
