= Mount Machine =

Mountain in Hokkaido, Japan

- Location within Japan

Highest point
- Elevation: 1,002 m (3,287 ft)
- Prominence: 70 m (230 ft)
- Parent peak: Pinneshiri (Kabato)
- Listing: List of mountains and hills of Japan by height
- Coordinates: 43°29′12″N 141°42′58″E

Naming
- Native name: 待根山 (Ainu)
- English translation: Female Mountain

Geography
- Location: Hokkaidō, Japan
- Parent range: Kabato Mountains
- Topo map(s): Geospatial Information Authority 25000:1 ピンネシリ; 50000:1 留萌

Mount Machine (待根山, Machine-yama) is a mountain located in the Kabato Mountains on the border of Tōbetsu and Shintotsukawa, Hokkaidō, Japan.

== Etymology ==
Mount Machine derives its name from the Ainu language matne-sir, meaning "female land". The name of neighboring Pinneshiri means '"male land".

Pinneshiri, Mount Kamuishiri, and Mount Machine are together known as The Three Mountains of Kabato (樺戸三山, Kabato Sanzan).
