= Freestyle skiing at the 1998 Winter Olympics – Women's moguls =

Women's moguls at the XVIII Olympic Winter Games
- Venue: Iizuna Kogen Ski Area
- Dates: 8–11 February 1998
- Competitors: 28 from 16 nations
- Winning Score: 25.06

Medalists
1st place, gold medalist(s)		Tae Satoya	Japan
2nd place, silver medalist(s)		Tatjana Mittermayer	Germany
3rd place, bronze medalist(s)		Kari Traa	Norway

The Women's moguls event in freestyle skiing at the 1998 Winter Olympics in Nagano took place from 8 to 11 February at Iizuna Kogen Ski Area.

== Results ==
=== Qualification ===
The top 16 advanced to the final.

Rank	Name	Country	Score	Notes
1	Donna Weinbrecht	United States	23.35	Q
1	Ann-Marie Pelchat	Canada	23.35	Q
3	Liz McIntyre	United States	23.07	Q
3	Tatjana Mittermayer	Germany	23.07	Q
5	Marja Elfman	Sweden	23.03	Q
6	Sandra Schmitt	Germany	22.63	Q
7	Lyudmila Dymchenko	Russia	22.53	Q
8	Kari Traa	Norway	22.51	Q
9	Anja Bolbjerg	Denmark	22.41	Q
10	Minna Karhu	Finland	22.39	Q
11	Tae Satoya	Japan	22.29	Q
12	Gabriele Rauscher	Germany	22.11	Q
13	Aiko Uemura	Japan	21.82	Q
14	Sara Kjellin	Sweden	21.59	Q
15	Tami Bradley	Canada	21.28	Q
16	Ann Battelle	United States	21.24	Q
17	Yelena Korolyova	Russia	20.97	
18	Yelena Vorona	Russia	20.54	
19	Yuliya Milko-Chernomorets	Belarus	20.2	
20	Corinne Bodmer	Switzerland	19.93	
21	Jenny Eidolf	Sweden	19.74	
22	Petra Moroder	Italy	19.3	
23	Maria Despas	Australia	18.94	
24	Josée Charbonneau	Canada	18.54	
25	Nadezhda Radovitskaya	Russia	13.41	
-	Kylie Gill	New Zealand	DNF	
-	Irina Kormysheva	Kazakhstan	DNF	
-	Candice Gilg	France	DNF	

=== Final ===
Rank	Name	Country	Score	Notes
1st place, gold medalist(s)	Tae Satoya	Japan	25.06	
2nd place, silver medalist(s)	Tatjana Mittermayer	Germany	24.62	
3rd place, bronze medalist(s)	Kari Traa	Norway	24.09	
4	Donna Weinbrecht	United States	24.02	
5	Ann-Marie Pelchat	Canada	23.95	
6	Minna Karhu	Finland	23.83	
7	Aiko Uemura	Japan	23.79	
8	Liz McIntyre	United States	23.72	
9	Sandra Schmitt	Germany	23.67	
10	Ann Battelle	United States	23.65	
11	Gabriele Rauscher	Germany	23.59	
12	Marja Elfman	Sweden	22.58	
13	Anja Bolbjerg	Denmark	22.09	
14	Sara Kjellin	Sweden	21.52	
15	Lyudmila Dymchenko	Russia	21.02	
16	Tami Bradley	Canada	15.02	
