= Pinneshiri (Kabato) =

Mountain in Hokkaidō, Japan

- ピンネシリ
- Location within Japan

Highest point
- Elevation: 1,100.4 m (3,610 ft)
- Listing: List of mountains and hills of Japan by height
- Coordinates: 43°29′31″N 141°42′24″E

Naming
- English translation: Male Mountain
- Language of name: Ainu

Geography
- Location: Hokkaidō, Japan
- Parent range: Kabato Mountains
- Topo map(s): Geospatial Information Authority 25000:1 ピンネシリ; 50000:1 留萌

Pinneshiri (ピンネシリ) is a mountain located in the Kabato Mountains on the border of Tōbetsu and Shintotsukawa, Hokkaidō, Japan. Pinneshiri derives its name from the Ainu language pinne-sir, meaning "male land". The name of neighboring Mount Machine means "female land". Pinneshiri, Mount Kamuishiri, and Mount Machine are together known as The Three Mountains of Kabato (樺戸三山, Kabato Sanzan).

== Climbing route ==
There are two climbing routes:

- Shintotsukawa course
- Dōmin no Mori course

On the first Sunday of July, Shintotsukawa hosts a race up Pinneshiri (ピンネシリ登山マラソン, Pinneshiri Tozan Marason)
