= Kabato Mountains =

Highest point
- Coordinates: 43°27′18.5890″N 141°43′42.7930″E

Naming
- Native name: 樺戸山地 (Japanese); Kabato Sanchi (Japanese)

Geography
- Country: Japan
- State: Hokkaidō
- Regions: Ishikari and Sorachi
- Districts: Ishikari District and Kabato District
- Municipalities: Shintotsukawa and Tōbetsu
- Parent range: Mashike Mountains

The Kabato Mountains (樺戸山地, Kabato Sanchi) are a mountain range on the western coast of Hokkaidō. It is part of the Mashike Mountains.

== Geology ==
Early Cretaceous aged igneous and sedimentary rocks are exposed in the Kabato Mountains and are referred to as the Kumaneshiri Group. The Kumaneshiri Group specifically consists of mudstone, volcaniclastic sandstone and tuff, as well as reworked volcanic-sedimentary conglomerate, and tuff breccia. There are also pillow lava and dykes.

The peaks of the Kabato mountains include the following:

- Pinneshiri (Kabato)
- Mount Machine
- Mount Kamuishiri
