= Gabriele Rauscher =

German freestyle skier

Personal information
- Born: 20 November 1970 (age 54); Münsingen, Baden-Württemberg, Germany

Sport
- Country: Germany
- Sport: Freestyle skiing

Gabriele Rauscher (born 20 November 1970) is a German freestyle skier. She was born in Münsingen in Baden-Württemberg. She competed at the 1998 Winter Olympics, in women's moguls.
