= Yuliya Milko-Chernomorets =

Belarusian freestyle skier

Personal information
- Nationality: Belarusian
- Born: 11 October 1975 (age 49); Minsk, Belarus

Sport
- Sport: Freestyle skiing

Yuliya Milko-Chernomorets (born 11 October 1975) is a Belarusian freestyle skier. She competed in the women's moguls event at the 1998 Winter Olympics.
