= Nadezhda Radovitskaya =

Russian freestyle skier

Personal information
- Nationality: Russian
- Born: 20 November 1977 (age 47); Saint Petersburg, Russia

Sport
- Sport: Freestyle skiing

Nadezhda Radovitskaya (born 20 November 1977) is a Russian freestyle skier. She competed in the women's moguls event at the 1998 Winter Olympics.
