= Josée Charbonneau =

Canadian freestyle skier

Personal information
- Born: 8 June 1972 (age 53) Val-David, Quebec, Canada

Sport
- Country: Canada
- Sport: Freestyle skiing

Josée Charbonneau (born 8 June 1972) is a Canadian freestyle skier. She was born in Val-David, Quebec. She competed at the 1998 Winter Olympics, in women's moguls.
