= Shokanbetsu-Teuri-Yagishiri Quasi-National Park =

Quasi-national park in Hokkaido, Japan

- 暑寒別天売焼尻国定公園
- IUCN category V (protected landscape/seascape)
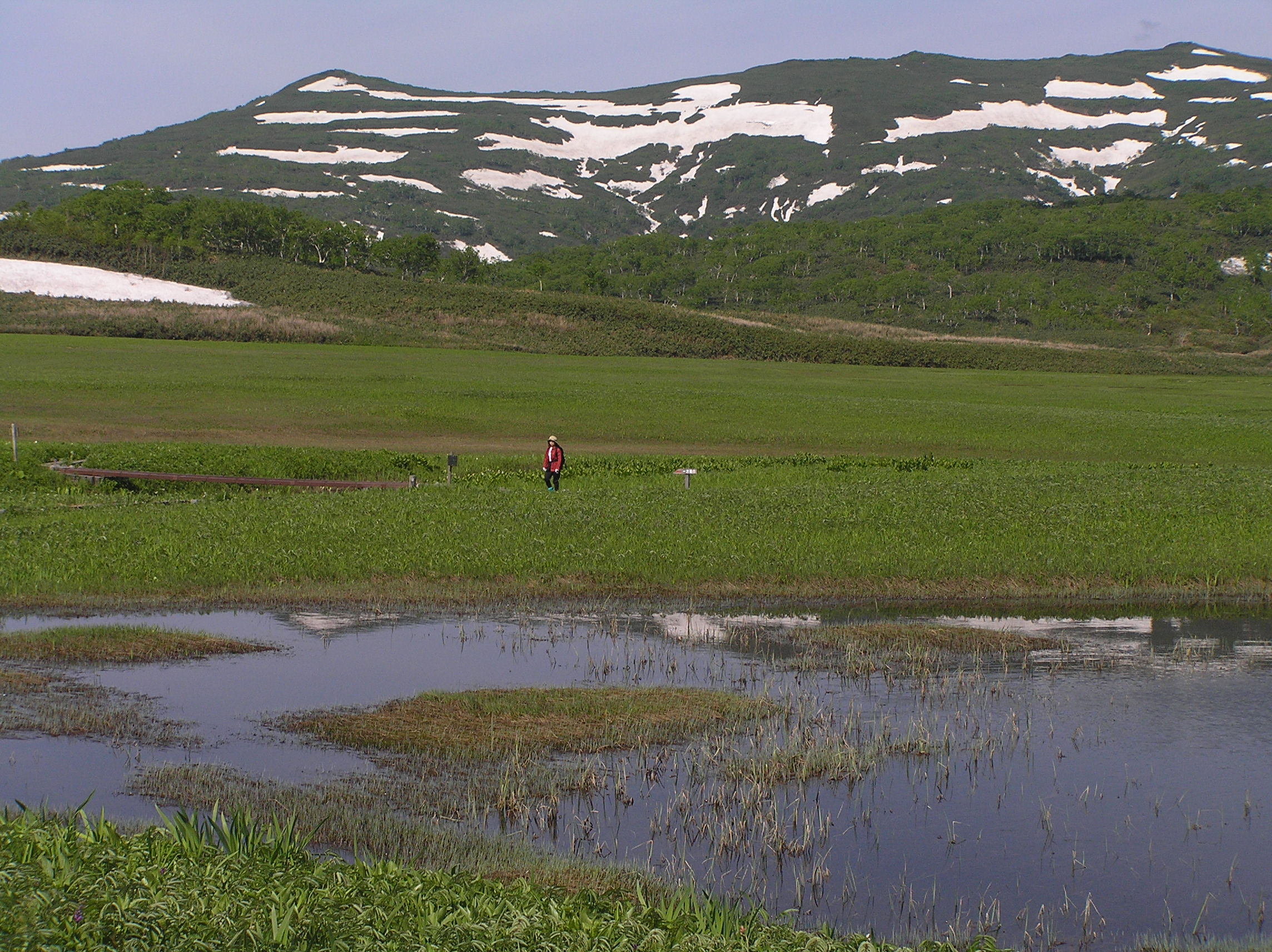
- Uryū wetlands and Mashike Mountains (July 2006)

- Location within Japan
- Location: Hokkaidō, Japan
- Nearest city: Haboro, Hokuryū, Ishikari, Mashike, Shintotsukawa, Uryū
- Coordinates: 43°N 141°E
- Area: 435.59 square kilometres (168.18 mi^{2})
- Established: August 1, 1990

Shokanbetsu-Teuri-Yagishiri Quasi-National Park (暑寒別天売焼尻国定公園, Shokanbetsu-Teuri-Yagishiri Kokutei Kōen) is a quasi-national park in Hokkaidō, Japan.

The park includes the following areas:

- Mashike Mountains
- Teuri Island
- Yagishiri Island

== See also ==
- Media related to Shokanbetsu-Teuri-Yagishiri Quasi-National Park at Wikimedia Commons
- List of national parks of Japan
