= Mount Kamuishiri =

Mountain in Tōbetsu, Hokkaidō, Japan

- 神居尻山
- Location within Japan

Highest point
- Elevation: 946.7 m (3,106 ft)
- Prominence: 320 m (1,050 ft)
- Parent peak: Pinneshiri (Kabato)
- Listing: List of mountains and hills of Japan by height
- Coordinates: 43°30′2″N 141°39′45″E

Naming
- English translation: Mountain of the Gods
- Language of name: Ainu

Geography
- Location: Hokkaidō, Japan
- Parent range: Kabato Mountains
- Topo map(s): Geospatial Information Authority 25000:1 ピンネシリ; 25000:1 南幌加; 50000:1 留萌

Mount Kamuishiri (神居尻山, Kamuishiri-yama) is a mountain located in the Kabato Mountains of Tōbetsu, Hokkaidō, Japan. Pinneshiri, Mount Kamuishiri, and Mount Machine are together known as The Three Mountains of Kabato (樺戸三山, Kabato Sanzan).

Kamuishiri is part of the Dōmin no Mori Kamuishiri Chiku (道民の森神居尻地区).

== Climbing routes ==
There are three hiking courses known as A, B, and C.
