= Mount Shokanbetsu =

Mountain in the country of Japan

- 暑寒別岳
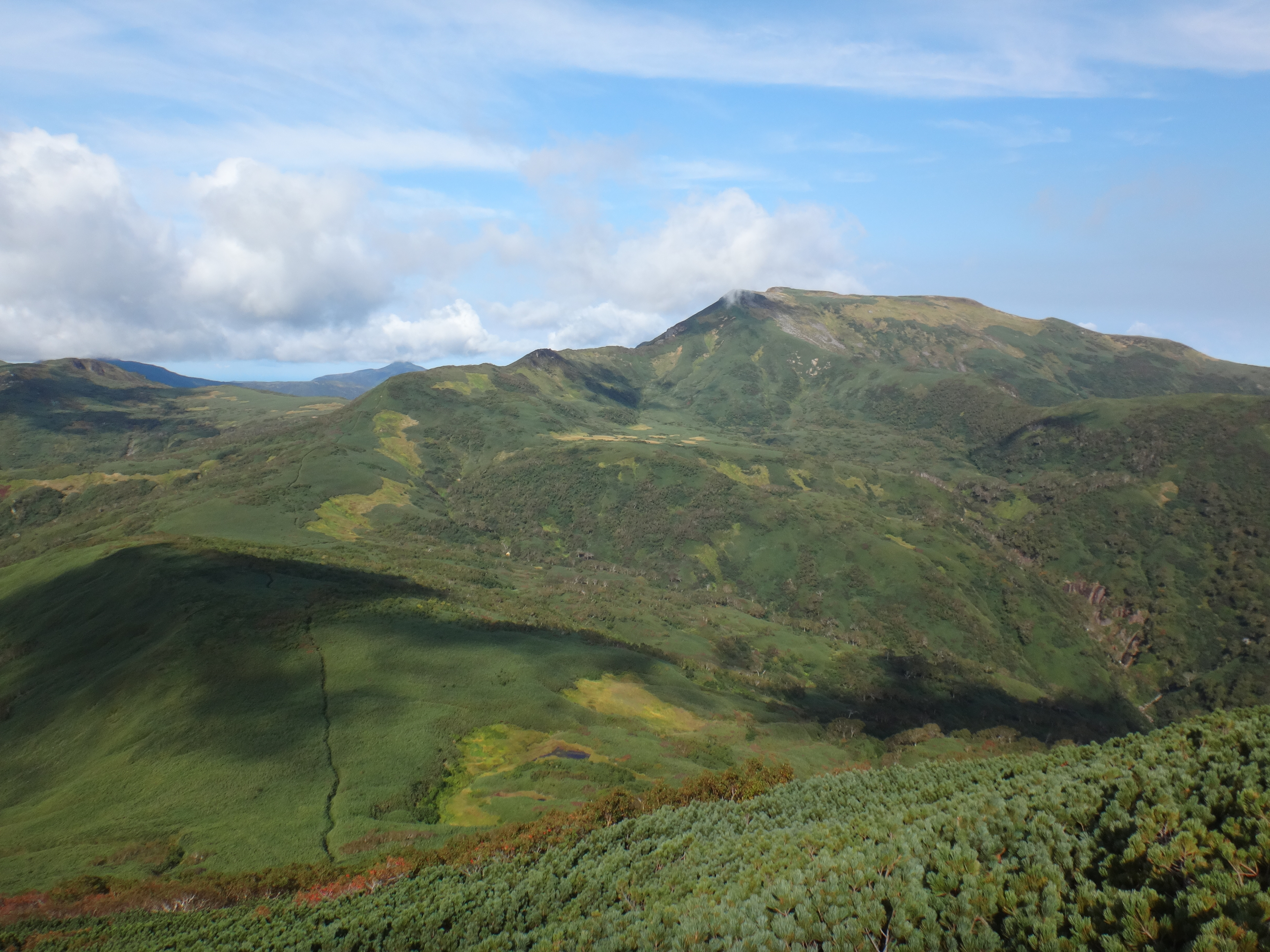
- Seen from the SE

Highest point
- Elevation: 1,491.6 m (4,894 ft)
- Prominence: 1,388 m (4,554 ft)
- Listing: List of mountains and hills of Japan by height, Ribu
- Coordinates: 43°42′57″N 141°31′23″E

Geography
- Location within Japan
- Location: Hokkaidō, Japan
- Parent range: Shokanbetsudake Mountains
- Topo map(s): Geospatial Information Authority 25000:1 暑寒別岳; 50000:1 留萌

Geology
- Rock age: Late Miocene to Early Pliocene
- Mountain type: volcanic

Mount Shokanbetsu (暑寒別岳, Shokanbetsu-dake) is the highest mountain of the Shokanbetsudake Mountains. It is located on the border between Hokuryū, Shintotsukawa and Mashike, Hokkaidō, Japan. The peak is also known as Mashike Fuji (増毛富士).

== Geology ==
Mount Shokanbetsu is made from non-alkaline mafic volcanic rock.
