= Ann-Marie Pelchat =

Canadian freestyle skier

Personal information
- Born: 30 May 1974 (age 50); Lévis, Quebec, Canada

Sport
- Country: Canada
- Sport: Freestyle skiing

Ann-Marie Pelchat (born 30 May 1974) is a Canadian freestyle skier. She was born in Lévis, Quebec. She competed at the 1998 Winter Olympics, where she placed fifth in women's moguls.
