= Iizuna Kogen Ski Area =

Ski resort in Nagano, Japan

Coordinates: 36.71706°N 138.139923°E

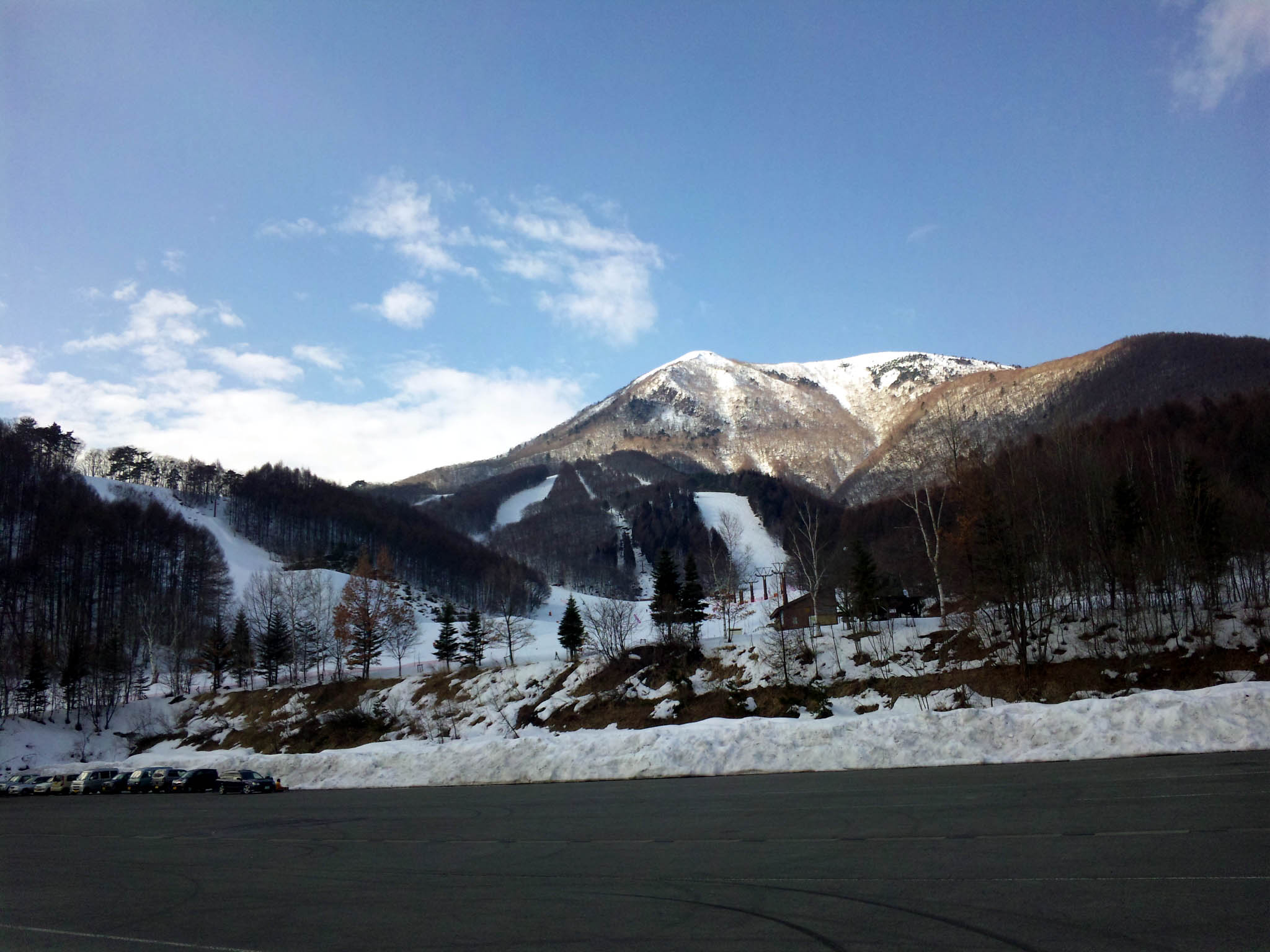
- Interactive map of Iizuna Kogen Ski Area
- Location: Nagano, Nagano, Japan
- Vertical: 400 m (1,312 ft)
- Top elevation: 1,480 m (4,856 ft)
- Base elevation: 1,080 m (3,543 ft)
- Trails: 10
- Longest run: 1,500 m (4,900 ft)
- Lift system: 5 (1 quad chairlift, and 4 pair chairlifts)
- Website: Iizuna Kogen Website

Iizuna Kogen Ski Area (飯綱高原スキー場, Iizuna Kōgen Sukī-jō) is a skiing area located in Nagano, Nagano, Japan. It is operated by Nagano City.

Constructed on existing alpine skiing runs, it hosted the freestyle skiing events for the 1998 Winter Olympics. The venue was a temporary one for those games.

The resort has steadily declined in popularity and closed in March, 2020 due to insufficient ski numbers and lack of snow fall. The prefecture has offered the resort for free to interested parties if they take on the business liabilities.
