= Shintotsukawa, Hokkaido =

Shintotsukawa 新十津川町
- Town
- Flag Seal

- Location of Shintotsukawa in Hokkaido (Sorachi Subprefecture)

- Location in Japan
- Coordinates: 43°33′N 141°53′E
- Country: Japan
- Region: Hokkaido
- Prefecture: Hokkaido (Sorachi Subprefecture)
- District: Kabato

Government
  - Mayor: Mitsuru Ueda

Area
  - Total: 495.62 km^{2} (191.36 sq mi)

Population (September 30, 2016)
  - Total: 6,787
  - Density: 13.69/km^{2} (35.47/sq mi)
- Time zone: UTC+09:00 (JST)
- City hall address: 301-1 Chūō, Shintotsukawa-chō, Kabato-gun, Hokkaidō; 073-1103
- Website: www.town.shintotsukawa.lg.jp
- Symbols
- Flower: Azalea
- Mascot: Komezo (こめぞー)
- Tree: Japanese yew

Shintotsukawa (新十津川町, Shintotsukawa-chō; "New Totsukawa") is a town located in Sorachi Subprefecture, Hokkaido, Japan.

== Population ==
As of September 2016, the town has an estimated population of 6,787, and a population density of 14 persons per km^{2}. The total area is 495.62 km^{2}.

== History ==
In 1889, a group of settlers from Totsukawa in Nara Prefecture relocated there following catastrophic flooding.

== Geography ==
Shintotsukawa is located in the near center of the Sorachi Subprefecture's administrative zone. The eastern area is where Ishikari River and Sorachi River converge, along the right bank of the Ishikari River. The western area is Mt. Shokanbetsu, located in the heart of Shokanbetsu Mountain Range.

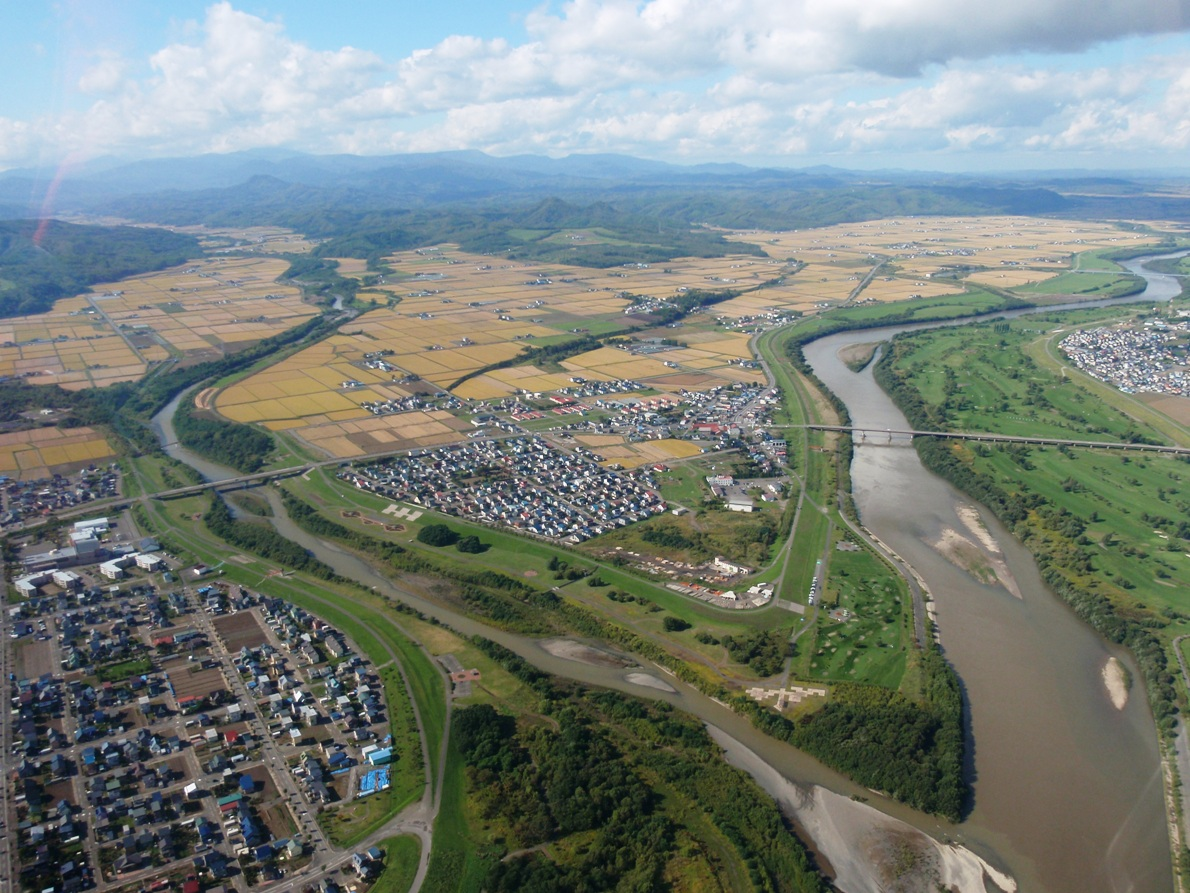
Aerial view from a glider

=== Climate ===
Climate data for Yoshino, Sorachi（1991 - 2020）
Month	Jan	Feb	Mar	Apr	May	Jun	Jul	Aug	Sep	Oct	Nov	Dec	Year
Record high °C (°F)	8.8 (47.8)	9.6 (49.3)	14.6 (58.3)	25.2 (77.4)	32.9 (91.2)	34.3 (93.7)	36.3 (97.3)	36.8 (98.2)	32.5 (90.5)	26.7 (80.1)	20.1 (68.2)	13.0 (55.4)	36.8 (98.2)
Mean daily maximum °C (°F)	−2.6 (27.3)	−1.5 (29.3)	2.8 (37.0)	9.7 (49.5)	17.6 (63.7)	22.0 (71.6)	25.6 (78.1)	25.9 (78.6)	21.8 (71.2)	14.9 (58.8)	6.5 (43.7)	−0.5 (31.1)	11.9 (53.4)
Daily mean °C (°F)	−7.0 (19.4)	−6.3 (20.7)	−1.9 (28.6)	4.2 (39.6)	11.1 (52.0)	15.9 (60.6)	19.9 (67.8)	20.4 (68.7)	15.7 (60.3)	8.9 (48.0)	2.2 (36.0)	−4.3 (24.3)	6.6 (43.9)
Mean daily minimum °C (°F)	−12.6 (9.3)	−12.5 (9.5)	−7.7 (18.1)	−1.5 (29.3)	4.6 (40.3)	10.5 (50.9)	15.3 (59.5)	15.6 (60.1)	10.2 (50.4)	3.4 (38.1)	−1.9 (28.6)	−8.8 (16.2)	1.2 (34.2)
Record low °C (°F)	−30.2 (−22.4)	−27.2 (−17.0)	−26.9 (−16.4)	−12.3 (9.9)	−3.5 (25.7)	0.1 (32.2)	5.3 (41.5)	5.5 (41.9)	−0.1 (31.8)	−4.7 (23.5)	−14.8 (5.4)	−28.3 (−18.9)	−30.2 (−22.4)
Average precipitation mm (inches)	151.7 (5.97)	114.6 (4.51)	101.4 (3.99)	69.6 (2.74)	85.1 (3.35)	67.8 (2.67)	137.6 (5.42)	163.7 (6.44)	176.0 (6.93)	165.0 (6.50)	192.8 (7.59)	186.9 (7.36)	1,608.7 (63.33)
Average precipitation days (≥ 1.0 mm)	23.9	19.8	17.7	12.8	11.4	9.3	11.1	11.6	13.7	16.7	20.8	24.0	193.0
Mean monthly sunshine hours	56.3	66.9	117.8	164.9	197.4	165.6	156.4	153.3	155.1	126.8	61.4	39.5	1,463.3
Source 1: Japan Meteorological Agency
Source 2: 気象庁

== Culture ==
=== Mascot ===
Komezo, the town's mascot

Shintotsukawa's mascot is Komezo (こめぞー). His name is Komezo Totsukawa (とつかわ こめぞー, Totsukawa komezo). He is a rice ghost that likes rice and sake.

== Notable people from Shintotsukawa ==
- Yoshio Hachiro, politician
