= 1997–98 FIS Freestyle Skiing World Cup =

Freestyle skiing competitive season

Freestyle Skiing World Cup 1997/98
Discipline	Men	Women
Overall	(France) Fabrice Becker	(United States) Nikki Stone
Moguls	(United States) Jonny Moseley	(Sweden) Marja Elfman
Dual moguls	(Sweden) Jesper Rönnback	(Norway) Kari Traa
Aerials	(Canada) Nicolas Fontaine	(United States) Nikki Stone
Ballet	(France) Fabrice Becker	(Russia) Elena Batalova

Competition
Locations	11	11
Individual	29	29

The 1997/98 FIS Freestyle Skiing World Cup was the nineteenth World Cup season in freestyle skiing organised by International Ski Federation. The season started on 1 August 1997 and ended on 15 March 1998. This season included four disciplines: aerials, moguls, dual moguls and ballet. Dual moguls counted as season title and was awarded with small crystal globe separately from moguls.

== Men ==
=== Moguls ===
Num	Season	Date	Place	Event	Winner	Second	Third
10	1	6 December 1997	(France) Tignes	DM	(Canada) Jean-Luc Brassard	(Sweden) Jesper Rönnback	(France) Fabrice Ougier
11	2	28 February 1998	(France) Châtel	DM	(France) Johann Gregoire	(Sweden) Kurre Lansburgh	(United States) Travis Ramos
12	3	2 March 1998	(France) Châtel	DM	(France) Fabrice Ougier	(Australia) Adrian Costa	(Canada) Stéphane Rochon
13	4	10 March 1998	(Sweden) Hundfjället	DM	(Sweden) Jesper Rönnback	(Canada) Dominick Gauthier	(Finland) Sami Mustonen
14	5	15 March 1998	(Austria) Altenmarkt-Zauchensee	DM	(France) Johann Gregoire	(Sweden) Jesper Rönnbäck	(Norway) Stian Overå
168	1	5 December 1998	(France) Tignes	MO	(France) Thony Hemery	(United States) Jonny Moseley	(France) Laurent Niol
169	2	19 December 1997	(France) La Plagne	MO	(United States) Jonny Moseley	(Canada) Jean François Cusson	(Canada) Stéphane Rochon
170	3	20 December 1997	(France) La Plagne	MO	(United States) Jonny Moseley	(France) Fabrice Ougier	(Finland) Lauri Lassila
171	4	11 January 1998	(Canada) Mont Tremblant	MO	(Canada) Jean-Luc Brassard	(Canada) Dominick Gauthier (France) Julien Regnier-Lafforgue	
172	5	24 January 1998	(Canada) Blackcomb	MO	(Canada) Jean-Luc Brassard	(Finland) Lauri Lassila	(Japan) Yugo Tsukita
173	6	30 January 1998	(United States) Breckenridge	MO	(United States) Jonny Moseley	(United States) Evan Dybvig	(Finland) Lauri Lassila
174	7	9 March 1998	(Sweden) Hundfjället	MO	(United States) Jonny Moseley	(Sweden) Jesper Rönnback	(Finland) Janne Lahtela
175	8	14 March 1998	(Austria) Altenmarkt-Zauchensee	MO	(United States) Jonny Moseley	(France) Fabrice Ougier	(Canada) Jean-Luc Brassard

=== Aerials ===
Num	Season	Date	Place	Event	Winner	Second	Third
171	1	1 August 1997	(Australia) Mt. Buller	AE	(Canada) Nicolas Fontaine	(United States) Matt Chojnacki	(Canada) Andy Capicik
172	2	2 August 1997	(Australia) Mt. Buller	AE	(United States) Eric Bergoust	(United States) Britt Swartley	(Canada) Jeff Bean
173	3	12 December 1997	(France) Tignes	AE	(United States) Britt Swartley	(United States) Mariano Ferrario	(Canada) Andy Capicik
174	4	16 December 1997	(Italy) Piancavallo	AE	(Canada) Andy Capicik	(Canada) Nicolas Fontaine	(Canada) David Belhumeur
175	5	10 January 1998	(Canada) Mont Tremblant	AE	(Belarus) Vassili Vorobiov	(United States) Eric Bergoust	(United States) Britt Swartley
176	6	25 January 1998	(Canada) Blackcomb	AE	(United States) Eric Bergoust	(Canada) Nicolas Fontaine	(Australia) Jonathan Sweet
177	7	31 January 1998	(United States) Breckenridge	AE	(United States) Kip Griffin	(Canada) David Belhumeur	(Canada) Nicolas Fontaine
178	8	1 March 1998	(France) Châtel	AE	(Russia) Aleksandr Mikhaylov	(Canada) Nicolas Fontaine	(Canada) Andy Capicik
179	9	7 March 1998	(Switzerland) Meiringen-Hasliberg	AE	(Canada) Nicolas Fontaine	(Belarus) Aleksei Grishin	(Germany) Gerhard Melcher
180	10	13 March 1998	(Austria) Altenmarkt-Zauchensee	AE	(United States) Eric Bergoust	(United States) Britt Swartley	(Canada) Nicolas Fontaine

=== Ballet ===
Num	Season	Date	Place	Event	Winner	Second	Third
168	1	9 January 1998	(Canada) Mont Tremblant	AC	(France) Fabrice Becker	(United States) Ian Edmondson	(Switzerland) Heini Baumgartner
169	2	23 January 1998	(Canada) Blackcomb	AC	(France) Fabrice Becker	(Switzerland) Heini Baumgartner	(United States) Ian Edmondson
170	3	29 January 1998	(United States) Breckenridge	AC	(Switzerland) Konrad Hilpert	(United States) Steven Roxberg	(United States) Ian Edmondson
171	4	6 March 1998	(Switzerland) Meiringen-Hasliberg	AC	(United States) Ian Edmondson	(France) Fabrice Becker	(Finland) Antti Inberg
172	5	13 March 1998	(Austria) Altenmarkt-Zauchensee	AC	(France) Fabrice Becker	(Switzerland) Konrad Hilpert	(Switzerland) Heini Baumgartner
173	6	13 March 1998	(Austria) Altenmarkt-Zauchensee	AC	(United States) Ian Edmondson	(Switzerland) Heini Baumgartner	(Switzerland) Konrad Hilpert

== Ladies ==
=== Moguls ===
Num	Season	Date	Place	Event	Winner	Second	Third
10	1	6 December 1997	(France) Tignes	DM	(France) Candice Gilg	(Canada) Anne-Marie Pelchat	(United States) Ann Battelle
11	2	28 February 1998	(France) Châtel	DM	(France) Candice Gilg	(Sweden) Marja Elfman	(United States) Brooke Ballachey
12	3	2 March 1998	(France) Châtel	DM	(Sweden) Marja Elfman	(United States) Brooke Ballachey	(Canada) Anne-Marie Pelchat
13	4	10 March 1998	(Sweden) Hundfjället	DM	(Norway) Kari Traa	(France) Candice Gilg	(Germany) Sandra Schmitt
14	5	15 March 1998	(Austria) Altenmarkt-Zauchensee	DM	(Norway) Kari Traa	(Sweden) Jenny Eidolf	(United States) Jillian Vogtli
168	1	5 December 1997	(France) Tignes	MO	(United States) Liz McIntyre	(Sweden) Marja Elfman	(Germany) Tatjana Mittermayer
169	2	19 December 1997	(France) La Plagne	MO	(Denmark) Anja Bolbjerg	(France) Candice Gilg	(Norway) Kari Traa
170	3	20 December 1997	(France) La Plagne	MO	(Sweden) Marja Elfman	(United States) Ann Battelle	(Germany) Gabriele Rauscher
171	4	11 January 1998	(Canada) Mont Tremblant	MO	(France) Candice Gilg	(United States) Ann Battelle	(Germany) Tatjana Mittermayer
172	5	24 January 1998	(Canada) Blackcomb	MO	(United States) Ann Battelle	(France) Candice Gilg	(Norway) Kari Traa
173	6	30 January 1998	(United States) Breckenridge	MO	(Sweden) Jenny Eidolf	(Sweden) Sara Kjellin	(Canada) Kelly Ringstad
174	7	9 March 1997	(Sweden) Hundfjället	MO	(Japan) Tae Satoya	(Sweden) Marja Elfman	(Norway) Kari Traa
175	8	14 March 1998	(Austria) Altenmarkt-Zauchensee	MO	(Norway) Kari Traa	(Sweden) Marja Elfman	(Germany) Tatjana Mittermayer

=== Aerials ===
Num	Season	Date	Place	Event	Winner	Second	Third
172	1	1 August 1997	(Australia) Mt. Buller	AE	(United States) Nikki Stone	(Canada) Veronica Brenner	(Canada) Caroline Olivier
173	2	2 August 1997	(Australia) Mt. Buller	AE	(China) Guo Dandan	(Canada) Veronica Brenner	(Australia) Kirstie Marshall
174	3	12 December 1997	(France) Tignes	AE	(United States) Nikki Stone	(Switzerland) Colette Brand	(Canada) Caroline Olivier
175	4	17 December 1997	(Italy) Piancavallo	AE	(United States) Nikki Stone	(Canada) Veronica Brenner	(Australia) Jacqui Cooper
176	5	10 January 1998	(Canada) Mont Tremblant	AE	(China) Ji Xiaoou	(Australia) Jacqui Cooper	(Australia) Kirstie Marshall
177	6	25 January 1998	(Canada) Blackcomb	AE	(United States) Nikki Stone	(Australia) Jacqui Cooper	(Russia) Natalia Orekhova
178	7	31 January 1998	(United States) Breckenridge	AE	(Australia) Jacqui Cooper	(United States) Nikki Stone	(Switzerland) Colette Brand
179	8	1 March 1998	(France) Châtel	AE	(Australia) Jacqui Cooper	(Australia) Kirstie Marshall	(Russia) Natalia Orekhova
180	9	7 March 1998	(Switzerland) Meiringen-Hasliberg	AE	(Australia) Jacqui Cooper	(United States) Nikki Stone	(Switzerland) Michèle Rohrbach
181	10	13 March 1998	(Austria) Altenmarkt-Zauchensee	AE	(Australia) Kirstie Marshall	(United States) Nikki Stone	(Russia) Natalia Orekhova

=== Ballet ===
Num	Season	Date	Place	Event	Winner	Second	Third
169	1	9 January 1998	(Canada) Mont Tremblant	AC	(Russia) Elena Batalova	(Russia) Natalia Razumovskaya	(Sweden) Annika Johansson
170	2	23 January 1998	(Canada) Blackcomb	AC	(Russia) Natalia Razumovskaya	(Russia) Elena Batalova	(Slovakia) Zuzana Smiercakova
171	3	29 January 1998	(United States) Breckenridge	AC	(Russia) Elena Batalova	(Russia) Natalia Razumovskaya	(Russia) Oksana Kushenko
172	4	6 March 1998	(Switzerland) Meiringen-Hasliberg	AC	(Russia) Elena Batalova	(Russia) Oksana Kushenko	(Sweden) Annika Johansson
173	5	13 March 1998	(Austria) Altenmarkt-Zauchensee	AC	(Russia) Elena Batalova	(Russia) Oksana Kushenko	(Sweden) Åsa Magnusson
174	6	13 March 1998	(Austria) Altenmarkt-Zauchensee	AC	(Russia) Oksana Kushenko	(Sweden) Åsa Magnusson	(Russia) Elena Batalova

== Men's standings ==
=== Overall ===
Rank		Points
1	(France) Fabrice Becker	109
2	(United States) Jonny Moseley	99
3	(United States) Ian Edmondson	97
4	(Canada) Nicolas Fontaine	96
5	(Switzerland) Heini Baumgartner	94

- Standings after 29 races.

=== Moguls ===
Rank		Points
1	(United States) Jonny Moseley	596
2	(Canada) Jean-Luc Brassard	528
3	(Finland) Lauri Lassila	500
4	(Sweden) Jesper Rönnbäck	472
5	(Canada) Stéphane Rochon	472

- Standings after 8 races.

=== Aerials ===
Rank		Points
1	(Canada) Nicolas Fontaine	672
2	(Canada) Andy Capicik	632
3	(United States) Britt Swartley	624
4	(United States) Eric Bergoust	592
5	(Czech Republic) Aleš Valenta	536

- Standings after 10 races.

=== Ballet ===
Rank		Points
1	(France) Fabrice Becker	388
2	(United States) Ian Edmondson	388
3	(Switzerland) Heini Baumgartner	376
4	(Switzerland) Konrad Hilpert	368
5	(United States) Steven Roxberg	340

- Standings after 6 races.

=== Dual moguls ===
Rank		Points
1	(Sweden) Jesper Rönnbäck	364
2	(Canada) Jean-Luc Brassard	316
3	(France) Johann Gregoire	312
4	(France) Fabrice Ougier	300
5	(Canada) Stéphane Rochon	284

- Standings after 5 races.

== Ladies' standings ==
=== Overall ===
Rank		Points
1	(United States) Nikki Stone	98
2	(Russia) Elena Batalova	98
3	(Russia) Oksana Kushenko	96
4	(Australia) Jacqui Cooper	94
5	(Sweden) Marja Elfman	93

- Standings after 29 races.

=== Moguls ===
Rank		Points
1	(Sweden) Marja Elfman	560
2	(France) Candice Gilg	536
3	(Germany) Tatjana Mittermayer	532
4	(United States) Ann Battelle	524
5	(Norway) Kari Traa	516

- Standings after 8 races.

=== Aerials ===
Rank		Points
1	(United States) Nikki Stone	688
2	(Australia) Jacqui Cooper	660
3	(Australia) Kirstie Marshall	632
4	(Canada) Caroline Olivier	596
5	(Canada) Veronica Brenner	584

- Standings after 10 races.

=== Ballet ===
Rank		Points
1	(Russia) Elena Batalova	392
2	(Russia) Oksana Kushenko	384
3	(Russia) Natalia Razumovskaya	364
4	(Sweden) Åsa Magnusson	356
5	(Sweden) Annika Johansson	348

- Standings after 6 races.

=== Dual moguls ===
Rank		Points
1	(Norway) Kari Traa	344
2	(Sweden) Marja Elfman	340
3	(France) Candice Gilg	336
4	(United States) Brooke Ballachey	308
5	(Canada) Anne-Marie Pelchat	296

- Standings after 5 races.
