= 1999 FIS Freestyle Skiing World Cup =

Freestyle skiing competitive season

Freestyle Skiing World Cup 1999
Discipline	Men	Women
Overall	(Canada) Nicolas Fontaine	(Australia) Jacqui Cooper
Moguls	(Finland) Janne Lahtela	(United States) Ann Battelle
Dual moguls	(France) Thony Hemery	(United States) Michelle Roark
Aerials	(Canada) Nicolas Fontaine	(Australia) Jacqui Cooper
Ballet	—	(Russia) Elena Batalova
- Nations Cup: United States

Competition
Locations	7	7
Individual	14	14

The 1999 FIS Freestyle Skiing World Cup was the twentieth World Cup season in freestyle skiing organised by International Ski Federation. The season started on 9 January 1999 and ended on 21 March 1999. This season included four disciplines: aerials, moguls, dual moguls and ballet.

Dual moguls counted as season title and was awarded with small crystal globe separately from moguls. Ballet title for men was not awarded.

== Men ==
=== Moguls ===
Num	Season	Date	Place	Event	Winner	Second	Third
15	1	16 January 1999	(United States) Steamboat	DM	(Canada) Stéphane Rochon	(Canada) Pierre-Alexandre Rousseau	(Norway) Patrick Søreide
16	2	31 January 1999	(Canada) Blackcomb	DM	(France) Thony Hemery	(Canada) Dominick Gauthier	(Finland) Janne Lahtela
17	3	21 February 1999	(Japan) Madarao	DM	(Canada) Stéphane Rochon	(Finland) Mikko Ronkainen	(France) Thony Hemery
176	1	9 January 1999	(Canada) Mont Tremblant	MO	(Canada) Jean-Luc Brassard	(Finland) Lauri Lassila	(Canada) Stéphane Rochon
177	2	23 January 1999	(United States) Heavenly	MO	(United States) Alex Wilson	(France) Richard Gay	(United States) Caleb Martin
178	3	30 January 1999	(Canada) Blackcomb	MO	(Finland) Janne Lahtela	(Canada) Jean-Luc Brassard	(France) Thony Hemery
179	4	17 February 1999	(Japan) Inawashiro	MO	(Finland) Janne Lahtela	(Canada) Stéphane Rochon	(United States) Caleb Martin
180	5	20 February 1999	(Japan) Madarao	MO	(Finland) Janne Lahtela	(France) Thony Hemery	(Canada) Stéphane Rochon

=== Aerials ===
Num	Season	Date	Place	Event	Winner	Second	Third
181	1	10 January 1999	(Canada) Mont Tremblant	AE	(Canada) Nicolas Fontaine	(Canada) Andy Capicik	(United States) Britt Swartley
182	2	17 January 1999	(United States) Steamboat	AE	(Belarus) Dmitri Dashinski	(Canada) Nicolas Fontaine	(United States) Eric Bergoust
183	3	24 January 1999	(United States) Heavenly	AE	(Belarus) Dmitri Dashinski	(United States) Joe Pack	(United States) Matt Chojnacki
184	4	9 February 1999	(Austria) Altenmarkt-Zauchensee	AE	(United States) Britt Swartley	(Austria) Christian Rijavec	(United States) Matt Chojnacki

=== Ballet ===
Num	Season	Date	Place	Event	Winner	Second	Third
174	1	15 January 1999	(United States) Steamboat	AC	(Switzerland) Konrad Hilpert	(United States) Ian Edmondson	(Switzerland) Heini Baumgartner
175	2	22 January 1999	(United States) Heavenly	AC	(United States) Steven Roxberg	(Finland) Antti Inberg	(Switzerland) Konrad Hilpert

== Ladies ==
=== Moguls ===
Num	Season	Date	Place	Event	Winner	Second	Third
15	1	16 January 1999	(United States) Steamboat	DM	(Germany) Sandra Schmitt	(Sweden) Marja Elfman	(United States) Ann Battelle
16	2	31 January 1999	(Canada) Blackcomb	DM	(United States) Michelle Roark	(United States) Brooke Ballachey	(Canada) Sylvia Kerfoot
17	3	21 February 1999	(Japan) Madarao	DM	(Sweden) Marja Elfman	(United States) Shannon Bahrke	(Germany) Sandra Schmitt
176	1	9 January 1999	(Canada) Mont Tremblant	MO	(Finland) Minna Karhu	(Switzerland) Corinne Bodmer	(United States) Ann Battelle
177	2	23 January 1999	(United States) Heavenly	MO	(Finland) Minna Karhu	(Sweden) Marja Elfman	(Japan) Aiko Uemura
178	3	30 January 1999	(Canada) Blackcomb	MO	(United States) Michelle Roark	(Sweden) Marja Elfman	(Norway) Kari Traa
179	4	17 February 1999	(Japan) Inawashiro	MO	(Japan) Tae Satoya	(Sweden) Marja Elfman	(United States) Michelle Roark
180	5	20 February 1999	(Japan) Madarao	MO	(United States) Ann Battelle	(Austria) Margarita Marbler	(Japan) Tae Satoya

=== Aerials ===
Num	Season	Date	Place	Event	Winner	Second	Third
182	1	10 January 1999	(Canada) Mont Tremblant	AE	(Australia) Jacqui Cooper	(United States) Nikki Stone	(Norway) Hilde Synnøve Lid
183	2	17 January 1999	(United States) Steamboat	AE	(Australia) Jacqui Cooper	(Canada) Veronica Brenner	(Norway) Hilde Synnøve Lid
184	3	25 January 1999	(United States) Heavenly	AE	(United States) Nikki Stone	(Australia) Jacqui Cooper	(Canada) Veronica Brenner
185	4	9 February 1999	(Austria) Altenmarkt-Zauchensee	AE	(Australia) Jacqui Cooper	(Canada) Veronica Brenner	(United States) Brenda Petzold

=== Ballet ===
Num	Season	Date	Place	Event	Winner	Second	Third
175	1	15 January 1999	(United States) Steamboat	AC	(Russia) Elena Batalova	(Russia) Natalia Razumovskaya	(Sweden) Annika Johansson
176	2	22 January 1999	(United States) Heavenly	AC	(Russia) Elena Batalova	(Russia) Oksana Kushenko	(Russia) Natalia Razumovskaya

== Men's standings ==
=== Overall ===
Rank		Points
1	(Canada) Nicolas Fontaine	97
2	(Belarus) Dmitri Dashinski	96
3	(Finland) Janne Lahtela	94
4	(United States) Britt Swartley	89
5	(Finland) Lauri Lassila	88

- Standings after 14 races.

=== Moguls ===
Rank		Points
1	(Finland) Janne Lahtela	376
2	(Finland) Lauri Lassila	352
3	(United States) Caleb Martin	316
4	(Canada) Jean-Luc Brassard	308
5	(Finland) Sami Mustonen	304

- Standings after 5 races.

=== Aerials ===
Rank		Points
1	(Canada) Nicolas Fontaine	292
2	(Belarus) Dmitri Dashinski	288
3	(United States) Britt Swartley	268
4	(United States) Brian Currutt	256
5	(United States) Eric Bergoust	244

- Standings after 4 races.

=== Dual moguls ===
Rank		Points
1	(France) Thony Hemery	260
2	(Canada) Stéphane Rochon	240
3	(Finland) Janne Lahtela	232
4	(France) Johann Gregoire	184
5	(Canada) Pierre-Alexandre Rousseau	172

- Standings after 3 races.

== Ladies' standings ==
=== Overall ===
Rank		Points
1	(Australia) Jacqui Cooper	100
2	(United States) Nikki Stone	95
3	(Canada) Veronica Brenner	95
4	(United States) Ann Battelle	92
5	(Sweden) Marja Elfman	92

- Standings after 14 races.

=== Moguls ===
Rank		Points
1	(United States) Ann Battelle	368
2	(Sweden) Marja Elfman	368
3	(United States) Michelle Roark	360
4	(Japan) Tae Satoya	336
5	(Austria) Margarita Marbler	324

- Standings after 5 races.

=== Aerials ===
Rank		Points
1	(Australia) Jacqui Cooper	300
2	(United States) Nikki Stone	284
3	(Canada) Veronica Brenner	284
4	(Norway) Hilde Synnøve Lid	268
5	information is not available

- Standings after 4 races.

=== Ballet ===
Rank		Points
1	(Russia) Elena Batalova	200
2	(Russia) Natalia Razumovskaya	188
3	(Russia) Oksana Kushenko	172
4	(Sweden) Annika Johansson	172
5	(Australia) Tarsha Ebbern	172

- Standings after 2 races.

=== Dual moguls ===
Rank		Points
1	(United States) Michelle Roark	244
2	(Sweden) Marja Elfman	236
3	(United States) Brooke Ballachey	220
4	(United States) Shannon Bahrke	208
5	(Germany) Sandra Schmitt	188

- Standings after 3 races.

== Standings: Nations Cup ==
=== Overall ===
Rank		Points
1	United States	1470
2	Canada	1097
3	Finland	438
4	Sweden	372
5	Japan	355

- Standings after 28 races.

=== Men ===
Rank		Points
1	Canada	757
2	United States	745
3	Finland	374
4	Belarus	205
5	France	190

- Standings after 14 races.

=== Ladies ===
Rank		Points
1	United States	725
2	Canada	340
3	Australia	247
4	Switzerland	237
5	Sweden	214

- Standings after 14 races.
