= 1999–2000 FIS Freestyle Skiing World Cup =

Freestyle skiing competitive season

Freestyle Skiing World Cup 1999/00
Discipline	Men	Women
Overall	(Finland) Janne Lahtela	(Australia) Jacqui Cooper
Moguls	(Finland) Janne Lahtela	(United States) Ann Battelle (Sweden) Marja Elfman
Dual moguls	(Finland) Janne Lahtela	(Norway) Kari Traa
Aerials	(Canada) Nicolas Fontaine	(Australia) Jacqui Cooper
- Nations Cup: United States

Competition
Locations	11	11
Individual	20	20
Cancelled	1	1

The 1999–2000 FIS Freestyle Skiing World Cup was the twenty first World Cup season in freestyle skiing organised by International Ski Federation. The season started on 11 September 1999 and ended on 17 March 2000. This season included three disciplines: aerials, moguls, dual moguls, and ballet. The ballet title was not awarded and this was the last season ballet was on world cup calendar.

Dual moguls counted as the season title and was awarded with a small crystal globe separately from moguls.

== Men ==
=== Moguls ===
Num	Season	Date	Place	Event	Winner	Second	Third
18	1	27 November 1999	(Sweden) Tandådalen	DM	(Canada) Stéphane Rochon	(Finland) Janne Lahtela	(Finland) Jari Savolainen
19	2	5 December 1999	(Canada) Blackcomb	DM	(Finland) Janne Lahtela	(France) Johann Gregoire	(Canada) Stéphane Rochon
20	3	29 January 2000	(Japan) Madarao	DM	(Japan) Yugo Tsukita	(Canada) Stéphane Rochon	(Canada) Jean-Luc Brassard
21	4	16 March 2000	(Italy) Livigno	DM	(Finland) Janne Lahtela	(Finland) Sami Mustonen	(Japan) Yugo Tsukita
181	1	27 November 1999	(Sweden) Tandådalen	MO	(Finland) Mikko Ronkainen	(Finland) Janne Lahtela	(United States) Evan Dybvig
182	2	8 January 2000	(United States) Deer Valley	MO	(Finland) Janne Lahtela	(United States) Evan Dybvig	(Canada) Pierre-Alexandre Rousseau
183	3	15 January 2000	(Canada) Mont Tremblant	MO	(Finland) Janne Lahtela	(France) Johann Gregoire	(United States) Toby Dawson
184	4	22 January 2000	(United States) Heavenly	MO	(Finland) Janne Lahtela	(Finland) Lauri Lassila	(Finland) Sami Mustonen
185	5	30 January 2000	(Japan) Madarao	MO	(Finland) Sami Mustonen	(Canada) Jay Vaughan	(Finland) Janne Lahtela
186	6	5 February 2000	(Japan) Inawashiro	MO	(Finland) Janne Lahtela	(Japan) Yugo Tsukita	(Norway) Stian Overå
187	7	15 March 2000	(Italy) Livigno	MO	(Finland) Janne Lahtela	(Canada) Pierre-Alexandre Rousseau	(United States) Garth Hager

=== Aerials ===
Num	Season	Date	Place	Event	Winner	Second	Third
185	1	11 September 1999	(Australia) Mt. Buller	AE	(Belarus) Aleksei Grishin	(Austria) Christian Rijavec	(Belarus) Dmitri Dashinski
186	2	12 September 1999	(Australia) Mt. Buller	AE	(Belarus) Aleksei Grishin	(Czech Republic) Aleš Valenta	(Canada) Nicolas Fontaine
187	3	4 December 1999	(Canada) Blackcomb	AE	(Canada) Nicolas Fontaine	(Canada) Steve Omischl	(Austria) Christian Rijavec
188	4	9 January 2000	(United States) Deer Valley	AE	(United States) Joe Pack	(Belarus) Aleksei Grishin	(United States) Britt Swartley
		16 January 2000	(Canada) Mont Tremblant	AE	cancelled		
189	5	23 January 2000	(United States) Heavenly	AE	(Canada) Kyle Nissen	(Canada) Nicolas Fontaine	(United States) Brian Currutt
190	6	26 February 2000	(Italy) Piancavallo	AE	(United States) Eric Bergoust	(Canada) Steve Omischl	(United States) Joe Pack
191	7	17 March 2000	(Italy) Livigno	AE	(Canada) Nicolas Fontaine	(United States) Joe Pack	(Belarus) Aleksei Grishin

=== Ballet ===
Num	Season	Date	Place	Event	Winner	Second	Third
176	1	21 January 2000	(United States) Heavenly	AC	(United States) Ian Edmondson	(Switzerland) Konrad Hilpert	(Canada) Mike McDonald
177	2	4 March 2000	(Italy) Livigno	AC	(United States) Ian Edmondson	(Switzerland) Konrad Hilpert	(Finland) Antti Inberg

== Ladies ==
=== Moguls ===
Num	Season	Date	Place	Event	Winner	Second	Third
18	1	27 November 1999	(Sweden) Tandådalen	DM	(Norway) Kari Traa	(Japan) Aiko Uemura	(United States) Ann Battelle
19	2	5 December 1999	(Canada) Blackcomb	DM	(Norway) Kari Traa	(United States) Ann Battelle	(Germany) Sandra Schmitt
20	3	29 January 2000	(Japan) Madarao	DM	(Germany) Sandra Schmitt	(United States) Ann Battelle	(Sweden) Marja Elfman
21	4	16 March 2000	(Italy) Livigno	DM	(Sweden) Marja Elfman	(Germany) Sandra Schmitt	(Norway) Kari Traa
181	1	27 November 1999	(Sweden) Tandådalen	MO	(Norway) Kari Traa	(Denmark) Anja Bolbjerg	(Canada) Tami Bradley
182	2	8 January 2000	(United States) Deer Valley	MO	(Germany) Sandra Schmitt	(United States) Ann Battelle	(Sweden) Marja Elfman
183	3	15 January 2000	(Canada) Mont Tremblant	MO	(Norway) Kari Traa	(Japan) Aiko Uemura	(Canada) Tami Bradley
184	4	22 January 2000	(United States) Heavenly	MO	(United States) Ann Battelle	(Sweden) Marja Elfman	(Norway) Kari Traa
185	5	30 January 2000	(Japan) Madarao	MO	(Canada) Tami Bradley	(Germany) Sandra Schmitt	(United States) Shannon Bahrke
186	6	5 February 2000	(Japan) Inawashiro	MO	(United States) Ann Battelle	(Sweden) Marja Elfman	(Germany) Sandra Schmitt
187	7	15 March 2000	(Italy) Livigno	MO	(Germany) Sandra Schmitt	(Sweden) Marja Elfman	(Norway) Kari Traa

=== Aerials ===
Num	Season	Date	Place	Event	Winner	Second	Third
186	1	11 September 1999	(Australia) Mt. Buller	AE	(Australia) Jacqui Cooper	(Canada) Veronica Brenner	(Norway) Hilde Synnøve Lid
187	2	12 September 1999	(Australia) Mt. Buller	AE	(Australia) Jacqui Cooper	(Norway) Hilde Synnøve Lid	(Canada) Veronika Bauer
188	3	4 December 1999	(Canada) Blackcomb	AE	(Russia) Natalia Orekhova	(Norway) Hilde Synnøve Lid	(Canada) Deidra Dionne
189	4	9 January 2000	(United States) Deer Valley	AE	(Australia) Jacqui Cooper	(Canada) Deidra Dionne	(United States) Marrissa Berman
		16 January 2000	(Canada) Mont Tremblant	AE	cancelled		
190	5	23 January 2000	(United States) Heavenly	AE	(Canada) Veronica Brenner	(Australia) Jacqui Cooper	(Switzerland) Evelyne Leu
191	6	26 February 2000	(Italy) Piancavallo	AE	(Australia) Jacqui Cooper	(Canada) Veronica Brenner	(Ukraine) Yuliya Kliukova
192	7	17 March 2000	(Italy) Livigno	AE	(Canada) Veronica Brenner	(Belarus) Alla Tsuper	(Australia) Alisa Camplin

=== Ballet ===
Num	Season	Date	Place	Event	Winner	Second	Third
177	1	21 January 2000	(United States) Heavenly	AC	(Russia) Elena Batalova	(Russia) Natalia Razumovskaya	(Russia) Oksana Kushenko
178	2	4 March 2000	(Italy) Livigno	AC	(Russia) Elena Batalova	(Sweden) Annika Johansson	(Russia) Natalia Razumovskaya

== Men's standings ==
=== Overall ===
Rank		Points
1	(Finland) Janne Lahtela	100
2	(Canada) Nicolas Fontaine	95
3	(Belarus) Aleksei Grishin	94
4	(United States) Joe Pack	91
5	(Finland) Sami Mustonen	88

- Standings after 20 races.

=== Moguls ===
Rank		Points
1	(Finland) Janne Lahtela	500
2	(Finland) Sami Mustonen	440
3	(Finland) Lauri Lassila	424
3	(Canada) Pierre-Alexandre Rousseau	424
5	(United States) Alex Wilson	404

- Standings after 7 races.

=== Aerials ===
Rank		Points
1	(Canada) Nicolas Fontaine	476
2	(Belarus) Aleksei Grishin	468
3	(United States) Joe Pack	456
4	(Canada) Steve Omischl	428
5	(Belarus) Dmitri Dashinski	420

- Standings after 7 races.

=== Dual moguls ===
Rank		Points
1	(Finland) Janne Lahtela	368
2	(Canada) Stéphane Rochon	357
3	(France) Johann Gregoire	304
4	(Japan) Yugo Tsukita	300
5	(Finland) Jari Savolainen	276

- Standings after 4 races.

== Ladies' standings ==
=== Overall ===
Rank		Points
1	(Australia) Jacqui Cooper	98
2	(United States) Veronica Brenner	95
3	(United States) Ann Battelle	94
3	(Sweden) Marja Elfman	94
5	(Germany) Sandra Schmitt	93

- Standings after 20 races.

=== Moguls ===
Rank		Points
1	(Sweden) Marja Elfman	468
1	(United States) Ann Battelle	468
3	(Germany) Sandra Schmitt	464
4	(Japan) Aiko Uemura	448
5	(Norway) Kari Traa	444

- Standings after 7 races.

=== Aerials ===
Rank		Points
1	(Australia) Jacqui Cooper	488
2	(United States) Veronica Brenner	473
3	(Norway) Hilde Synnøve Lid	432
4	(Belarus) Alla Tsuper	428
5	(Switzerland) Evelyne Leu	420

- Standings after 7 races.

=== Dual moguls ===
Rank		Points
1	(Norway) Kari Traa	372
2	(United States) Ann Battelle	364
3	(Germany) Sandra Schmitt	356
4	(Sweden) Marja Elfman	332
5	(Japan) Aiko Uemura	325

- Standings after 4 races.

== Standings: Nations Cup ==
=== Overall ===
Rank		Points
1	United States	1406
2	Canada	1326
3	France	543
4	Finland	387
5	Japan	351

- Standings after 40 races.

=== Men ===
Rank		Points
1	Canada	833
2	United States	824
3	Finland	474
4	Belarus	245
5	France	190

- Standings after 20 races.

=== Ladies ===
Rank		Points
1	United States	582
2	Canada	493
3	Australia	273
4	Switzerland	265
5	Japan	239

- Standings after 20 races.
