= 2001–02 FIS Freestyle Skiing World Cup =

Freestyle skiing competitive season

Freestyle Skiing World Cup 2001/02
Discipline	Men	Women
Overall	(United States) Eric Bergoust	(Norway) Kari Traa
Moguls	(United States) Jeremy Bloom	(Norway) Kari Traa
Dual moguls	(France) Richard Gay	(Germany) Christine Gerg
Aerials	(United States) Eric Bergoust	(Belarus) Alla Tsuper
- Nations Cup: United States

Competition
Locations	11	11
Individual	18	19
Cancelled	1	1

The 2001/02 FIS Freestyle Skiing World Cup was the twenty third World Cup season in freestyle skiing organised by International Ski Federation. The season started on 8 September 2001 and ended on 10 March 2002. This season included three disciplines: aerials, moguls and dual moguls.

After one season break, dual moguls again counted as season title and was awarded with small crystal globe separately from moguls.

== Men ==
=== Moguls ===
Num	Season	Date	Place	Event	Winner	Second	Third
23	1	15 December 2002	(United States) Steamboat	DM	(France) Richard Gay	(Finland) Janne Lahtela	(Canada) Stéphane Rochon
24	2	26 January 2002	(Canada) Whistler	DM	(United States) Garth Hager	(Canada) Stéphane Rochon	(France) Richard Gay
25	3	9 March 2002	(Japan) Madarao	DM	(Canada) Ryan Johnson	(United States) Ryan Riley	(Japan) Yugo Tsukita
195	1	1 December 2001	(France) Tignes	MO	(France) Johann Gregoire	(Canada) Stéphane Rochon	(United States) Jeremy Bloom
196	2	14 December 2001	(United States) Steamboat	MO	(Canada) Stéphane Rochon	(United States) Travis Mayer	(United States) Jeremy Bloom
197	3	6 January 2002	(Germany) Oberstdorf	MO	(Finland) Janne Lahtela	(France) Laurent Niol	(United States) Travis Ramos
198	4	11 January 2002	(France) Saint-Lary	MO	(United States) Jonny Moseley	(Sweden) Fredrik Fortkord	(Canada) Ryan Johnson
199	5	12 January 2002	(France) Saint-Lary	MO	(Finland) Sami Mustonen	(Finland) Janne Lahtela	(United States) Evan Dybvig
200	6	19 January 2002	(United States) Lake Placid	MO	(United States) Jeremy Bloom	(United States) Travis Mayer	(Canada) Jean-Luc Brassard
201	7	3 March 2002	(Japan) Inawashiro	MO	(Finland) Mikko Ronkainen	(United States) Jeremy Bloom	(Japan) Yugo Tsukita
202	8	10 March 2002	(Japan) Madarao	MO	(Finland) Sami Mustonen	(France) Richard Gay	(United States) Travis-Antone Cabral
203	9	16 March 2002	(Finland) Ruka	MO	(Finland) Mikko Ronkainen	(United States) Jeremy Bloom	(Canada) Stéphane Rochon

=== Aerials ===
Num	Season	Date	Place	Event	Winner	Second	Third
199	1	8 September 2001	(Australia) Mt. Buller	AE	(United States) Eric Bergoust	(Canada) Kyle Nissen	(Canada) Andy Capicik
		9 September 2001	(Australia) Mt. Buller	AE	cancelled		
200	2	12 January 2002	(Canada) Mont Tremblant	AE	(United States) Eric Bergoust	(Canada) Jeff Bean	(Czech Republic) Aleš Valenta
201	3	13 January 2002	(Canada) Mont Tremblant	AE	(Canada) Nicolas Fontaine	(Belarus) Aleksei Grishin	(United States) Eric Bergoust
202	4	18 January 2002	(United States) Lake Placid	AE	(Belarus) Aleksei Grishin	(Czech Republic) Aleš Valenta	(Canada) Steve Omischl
203	5	20 January 2002	(United States) Lake Placid	AE	(United States) Eric Bergoust	(Czech Republic) Aleš Valenta	(Belarus) Aleksei Grishin
204	6	27 January 2002	(Canada) Whistler	AE	(Russia) Dmitry Arkhipov	(Canada) Nicolas Fontaine	(Canada) Jeff Bean

== Ladies ==
=== Moguls ===
Num	Season	Date	Place	Event	Winner	Second	Third
23	1	15 December 2002	(United States) Steamboat	DM	(Germany) Christine Gerg	(United States) Emiko Torito	(Canada) Tami Bradley
24	2	26 January 2002	(Canada) Whistler	DM	(Canada) Rachel Belliveau	(Austria) Margarita Marbler	(Norway) Kari Traa
25	3	9 March 2002	(Japan) Madarao	DM	(Norway) Ingrid Berntsen	(Canada) Jennifer Heil	(Russia) Ljudmila Dymchenko
195	1	1 December 2001	(France) Tignes	MO	(Norway) Kari Traa	(United States) Hannah Hardaway	(Japan) Aiko Uemura
196	2	14 December 2001	(United States) Steamboat	MO	(Norway) Kari Traa	(Russia) Ljudmila Dymchenko	(Austria) Margarita Marbler
197	3	6 January 2002	(Germany) Oberstdorf	MO	(United States) Shannon Bahrke	(United States) Hannah Hardaway	(Canada) Jennifer Heil
198	4	11 January 2002	(France) Saint-Lary	MO	(Norway) Kari Traa	(Russia) Marina Cherkasova	(United States) Shannon Bahrke
199	5	12 January 2002	(France) Saint-Lary	MO	(Norway) Kari Traa	(United States) Shannon Bahrke	(United States) Hannah Hardaway
200	6	19 January 2002	(United States) Lake Placid	MO	(Norway) Kari Traa	(United States) Hannah Hardaway	(United States) Jillian Vogtli
201	7	3 March 2002	(Japan) Inawashiro	MO	(Canada) Jennifer Heil	(Norway) Kari Traa	(Japan) Aiko Uemura
202	8	10 March 2002	(Japan) Madarao	MO	(United States) Shannon Bahrke	(United States) Ann Battelle	(Austria) Margarita Marbler
203	9	16 March 2002	(Finland) Ruka	MO	(Norway) Kari Traa	(Japan) Tae Satoya	(United States) Ann Battelle

=== Aerials ===
Num	Season	Date	Place	Event	Winner	Second	Third
200	1	8 September 2001	(Australia) Mt. Buller	AE	(Australia) Jacqui Cooper	(China) Nina Li	(Russia) Nataliya Orekhova
201	2	9 September 2001	(Australia) Mt. Buller	AE	(Belarus) Alla Tsuper	(Australia) Alisa Camplin	(Belarus) Assoli Slivets
202	3	12 January 2002	(Canada) Mont Tremblant	AE	(Australia) Jacqui Cooper	(Belarus) Alla Tsuper	(Canada) Veronika Bauer
203	4	13 January 2002	(Canada) Mont Tremblant	AE	(Canada) Veronica Brenner	(Belarus) Alla Tsuper	(Switzerland) Manuela Müller
204	5	18 January 2002	(United States) Lake Placid	AE	(Canada) Veronika Bauer	(Australia) Jacqui Cooper	(Canada) Deidra Dionne
205	6	20 January 2002	(United States) Lake Placid	AE	(Belarus) Alla Tsuper	(China) Nannan Xu	(Canada) Veronica Brenner
206	7	27 January 2002	(Canada) Whistler	AE	(Belarus) Alla Tsuper	(China) Nannan Xu	(China) Nina Li

== Men's standings ==
=== Overall ===
Rank		Points
1	(United States) Eric Bergoust	98
2	(United States) Jeremy Bloom	94
3	(Belarus) Aleksei Grishin	94
4	(Czech Republic) Aleš Valenta	91
5	(Canada) Jeff Bean	86

- Standings after 18 races.

=== Moguls ===
Rank		Points
1	(United States) Jeremy Bloom	564
2	(Canada) Stéphane Rochon	508
3	(Finland) Sami Mustonen	500
4	(Finland) Janne Lahtela	488
5	(Finland) Mikko Ronkainen	484

- Standings after 9 races.

=== Aerials ===
Rank		Points
1	(Canada) Eric Bergoust	392
2	(Belarus) Aleksei Grishin	378
3	(Czech Republic) Aleš Valenta	364
4	(Canada) Jeff Bean	344
5	(Canada) Kyle Nissen	336

- Standings after 6 races.

=== Dual moguls ===
Rank		Points
1	(France) Richard Gay	264
2	(United States) Garth Hager	236
3	(Canada) Stéphane Rochon	188
4	(United States) Ryan Riley	168
5	(United States) Toby Dawson	164

- Standings after 3 races.

== Ladies' standings ==
=== Overall ===
Rank		Points
1	(Norway) Kari Traa	100
2	(Belarus) Alla Tsuper	98
3	(United States) Hannah Hardaway	93
4	(United States) Shannon Bahrke	93
5	(United States) Ann Battelle	89

- Standings after 19 races.

=== Moguls ===
Rank		Points
1	(Norway) Kari Traa	600
2	(United States) Hannah Hardaway	556
3	(United States) Shannon Bahrke	556
4	(United States) Ann Battelle	536
5	(Japan) Aiko Uemura	504

- Standings after 9 races.

=== Aerials ===
Rank		Points
1	(Belarus) Alla Tsuper	492
2	(Australia) Jacqui Cooper	428
3	(Canada) Deidra Dionne	420
4	(Canada) Veronika Bauer	420
5	(Canada) Veronica Brenner	380

- Standings after 7 races.

=== Dual moguls ===
Rank		Points
1	(Germany) Christine Gerg	232
2	(Norway) Kari Traa	212
3	(Canada) Tami Bradley	204
4	(Canada) Jennifer Heil	176
4	(United States) Emiko Torito	176

- Standings after 3 races.

== Nations Cup ==
=== Overall ===
Rank		Points
1	United States	1681
2	Canada	1294
3	Russia	502
4	Finland	458
5	Belarus	378

- Standings after 37 races.

=== Men ===
Rank		Points
1	United States	944
2	Canada	767
3	Finland	411
4	France	254
5	Belarus	215

- Standings after 18 races.

=== Ladies ===
Rank		Points
1	United States	737
2	Canada	527
3	Russia	366
4	Australia	271
5	China	222

- Standings after 19 races.
