= FIS Freestyle World Ski Championships 1999 =

International skiing competition

The 1999 FIS Freestyle World Ski Championships were held between March 10th and March 14th at the Meiringen-Hasliberg ski resort in Switzerland. The World Championships featured both men's and women's events in the Moguls, Aerials, Dual Moguls and Acro Skiing. This was to be the last appearance of Acro Skiing at the World Championships.

== Results ==
=== Men's results ===
==== Moguls ====
Medal	Name	Nation	Result
1st place, gold medalist(s)	Janne Lahtela	Finland	26.59
2nd place, silver medalist(s)	Lauri Lassila	Finland	26.12
3rd place, bronze medalist(s)	Sami Mustonen	Finland	26.07

==== Aerials ====
Medal	Name	Nation	Result
1st place, gold medalist(s)	Eric Bergoust	United States	253.03
2nd place, silver medalist(s)	Christian Rijavec	Austria	245.03
3rd place, bronze medalist(s)	Joe Pack	United States	238.40

==== Dual Moguls ====
Medal	Name	Nation
1st place, gold medalist(s)	Johann Gregoire	France
2nd place, silver medalist(s)	Janne Lahtela	Finland
3rd place, bronze medalist(s)	Lauri Lassila	Finland

==== Acro Skiing ====
Medal	Name	Nation	Result
1st place, gold medalist(s)	Ian Edmondson	United States	26.25
2nd place, silver medalist(s)	Mike McDonald	Canada	25.89
3rd place, bronze medalist(s)	Heini Baumgartner	Switzerland	25.75

=== Women's results ===
==== Moguls ====
Medal	Name	Nation	Result
1st place, gold medalist(s)	Ann Battelle	United States	24.37
2nd place, silver medalist(s)	Kari Traa	Norway	24.12
3rd place, bronze medalist(s)	Corinne Bodmer	Switzerland	23.80

==== Aerials ====
Medal	Name	Nation	Result
1st place, gold medalist(s)	Jacqui Cooper	Australia	197.83
2nd place, silver medalist(s)	Hilde Synnøve Lid	Norway	185.15
3rd place, bronze medalist(s)	Nikki Stone	United States	180.71

==== Dual Moguls ====
Medal	Name	Nation
1st place, gold medalist(s)	Sandra Schmitt	Germany
2nd place, silver medalist(s)	Kari Traa	Norway
3rd place, bronze medalist(s)	Ann Battelle	United States

==== Acro Skiing ====
Medal	Name	Nation	Result
1st place, gold medalist(s)	Natalia Razumovskaya	Russia	27.94
2nd place, silver medalist(s)	Oksana Kushenko	Russia	26.89
3rd place, bronze medalist(s)	Annika Johansson	Sweden	25.30

== Medal table ==
Rank	Nation	Gold	Silver	Bronze	Total
1	United States	3	0	3	6
2	Finland	1	2	2	5
3	Russia	1	1	0	2
4	Australia	1	0	0	1
4	France	1	0	0	1
4	Germany	1	0	0	1
7	Norway	0	3	0	3
8	Austria	0	1	0	1
8	Canada	0	1	0	1
10	Switzerland	0	0	2	2
11	Sweden	0	0	1	1
Totals (11 entries)		8	8	8	24
