= Alpine Museum =

Alpine Museum may refer to:

- Swiss Alpine Museum, Bern
- Alpine Museum Chamonix
- Alpine Museum Zermatt
- National Alpine Museum of Australia
