= Frederic Brunet =

Canadian ice hockey player (born 2003)

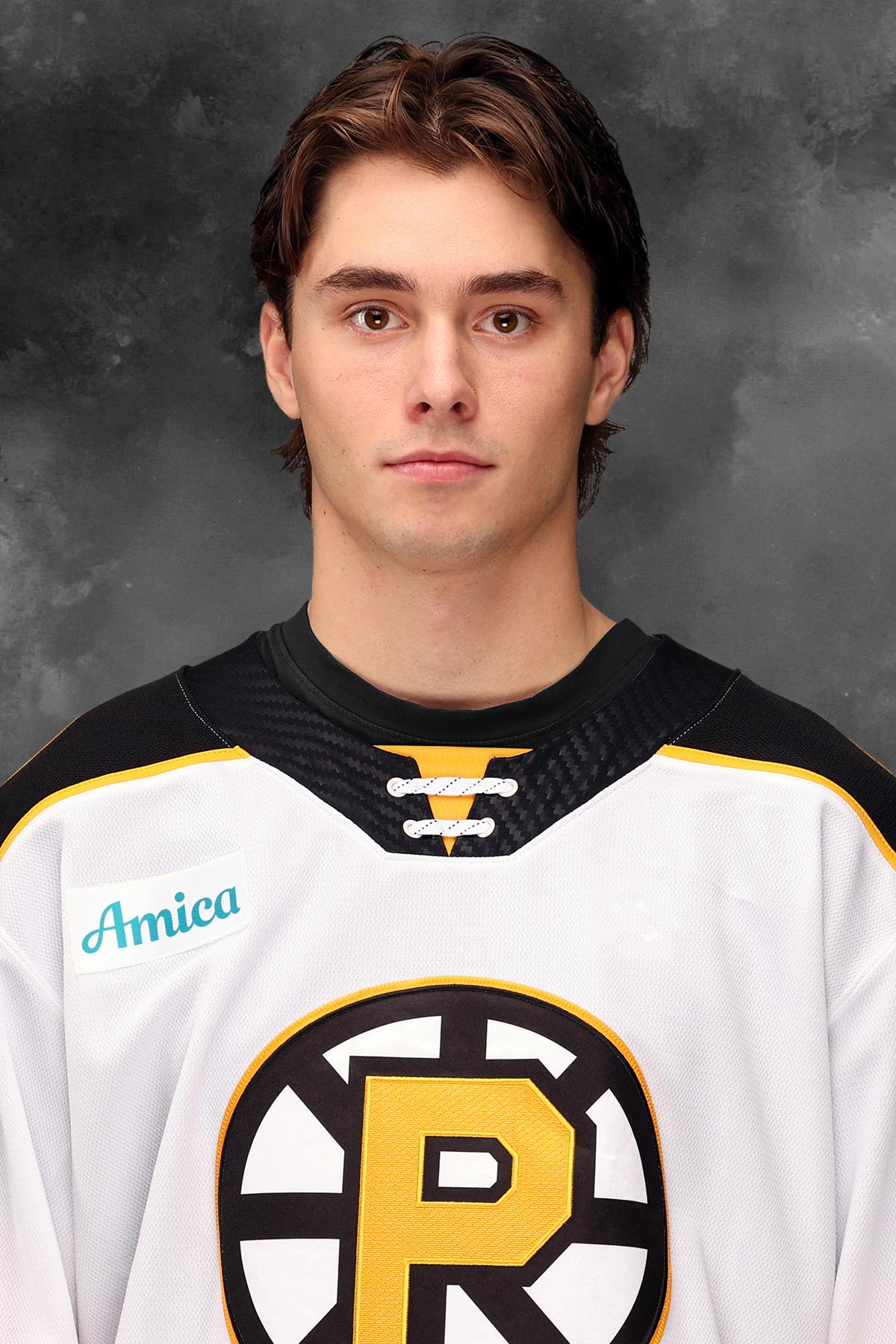
- Brunet with the Providence Bruins
- Born: August 21, 2003 (age 23) Gatineau, Quebec, Canada
- Height: 6 ft 3 in (191 cm)
- Weight: 196 lb (89 kg; 14 st 0 lb)
- Position: Defence
- Shoots: Left
- NHL team: Boston Bruins
- NHL draft: 132nd overall, 2022; Boston Bruins
- Playing career: 2023–present

Frederic Brunet (born August 21, 2003) is a Canadian professional ice hockey player who is a defenceman for the Boston Bruins of the National Hockey League (NHL).

== Playing career ==
=== Amateur ===
Starting in the 2019–20 season, Brunet played for the Rimouski Océanic of the Quebec Major Junior Hockey League (QMJHL). In his first full season with the team, Brunet struggled to produce offensively, scoring a goal and eight assists in 33 games. However, as he settled into QMJHL play, Brunet found his footing as an offensive defenceman. In the 2021–22 season, Brunet recorded 12 goals and 34 assists for 46 points. His 34 assists were good for second on the team, and he was fourth on the team in points. Brunet also settled in as a leader on the team, leading to him being named captain of the Rimouski Océanic starting in the 2022–23 season. Brunet continued to produce offensively, scoring 35 points in 36 games before he was traded to the Victoriaville Tigres. The midseason adjustment did not phase Brunet, who continued to score, this time 38 points in 30 games with the Tigres. Brunet finished the season with an impressive 16 goals and 57 assists for a defenceman. His 57 assists were tied for eighth in the QMJHL.

=== Professional ===
Brunet was drafted by the Boston Bruins in the fifth round of the 2022 NHL entry draft. On April 10, 2023, after his QMJHL season ended, it was announced that Brunet had signed an amateur try-out (ATO) agreement with Boston's American Hockey League (AHL) affiliate, the Providence Bruins. He played in one game with the team, scoring two assists for his first professional points.

On October 4, 2023, the Bruins announced that they had signed Brunet to a three-year, entry-level contract with the team.

For the 2023–24 season, Brunet played in Providence. Although he did not replicate the same offensive stats that he did in the QMJHL, Brunet provided a presence on the Providence defence in his first professional season, scoring two goals and 10 assists in 48 games with the team.

Brunet looked to build off his first season in 2024–25, and did just that. He improved offensively, recording five goals and 20 assists in 69 games, and his play caught the eyes of many in the Bruins organization as he continued to develop as a player. Brunet's play earned him a call-up to the NHL squad on April 14, 2025, where he would make his NHL debut with the Bruins in their final game of the season against the New Jersey Devils. After the game, Brunet returned to the AHL to help Providence with their playoff run, where he would record two assists in eight games before the Bruins were eliminated by the Charlotte Checkers.

== Personal life ==
Brunet comes from a family of Olympians. Brunet's brother is Cédrick Brunet, a Canadian speed skater. His aunt, Jennifer Heil is a multiple time Olympic medalist in the women's moguls. Meanwhile, his uncle is Dominick Gauthier, who competed in freestyle skiing at the 1998 Winter Olympics. Finally his dad, Michel Brunet, competed in figure skating at the Olympics.

== Career statistics ==
			Regular season					Playoffs
Season	Team	League	GP	G	A	Pts	PIM	GP	G	A	Pts	PIM
2019–20	Rimouski Océanic	QMJHL	1	0	0	0	0	—	—	—	—	—
2020–21	Rimouski Océanic	QMJHL	33	1	8	9	16	8	0	3	3	0
2021–22	Rimouski Océanic	QMJHL	63	12	34	46	16	9	0	3	3	4
2022–23	Rimouski Océanic	QMJHL	36	6	29	35	14	—	—	—	—	—
2022–23	Victoriaville Tigres	QMJHL	30	8	17	25	24	—	—	—	—	—
2022–23	Providence Bruins	AHL	1	0	2	2	0	—	—	—	—	—
2023–24	Providence Bruins	AHL	48	2	10	12	21	4	0	0	0	0
2024–25	Providence Bruins	AHL	69	5	20	25	29	8	0	2	2	6
2024–25	Boston Bruins	NHL	1	0	0	0	0	—	—	—	—	—
2025–26	Providence Bruins	AHL	65	12	24	36	30	4	0	2	2	6
NHL totals			1	0	0	0	0	—	—	—	—	—

== Awards and honours ==
Award	Year	Ref
QMJHL
QMJHL Second All-Star Team	2023	
AHL
AHL All-Star Game	2026	
