= Hannah Hardaway =

American freestyle skier

Hannah Hardaway (born December 10, 1978) is a former Olympic athlete on the U.S. Ski Team; she competed in the freestyle skiing events of moguls and dual moguls.

== United States Ski Team ==
Hannah Hardaway was a 5x Junior National Moguls Champion (she won her first Junior National Moguls Competition at just 13 years of age,) she was also a Junior World Moguls Champion (1997 in Finland), 6x National Champion (moguls and upright aerials,) and the winner of over 50 moguls competitions in her skiing career. Hannah made the US Ski Team at 16 years of age and her first World Cup was on January 5, 1996, when she was 17 years old. She finished 24th. In 34 World Cup starts, she finished on the podium eight times, and two of those were victories (in Deer Valley, Utah, on January 7, 2001, on the 2002 Olympic course exactly one year before the 2002 Olympics, and at World Cup Finals in Himos, Finland, on January 11, 2001). In her only Olympics, she placed 5th in Moguls in the 2002 Games held in Salt Lake City, Utah. She finished out the 2002 World Cup season ranked 2nd in the world. Fun Fact : Hannah was only a weekend skier up until the year before the 2002 Olympics! She was also co-valedictorian of her high school (Moultonborough Academy) where she played three Varsity sports (volleyball, basketball, and softball), was Secretary of her class, Vice President of the National Honor Society, the Editor of the Yearbook, and an active member in a number of other clubs and activities (Drama, Latin Club.) She was also the Captain and MVP of both her Volleyball and Softball teams her senior year of High School.

She has appeared in three Warren Miller ski films: Ride (2000, Breckenridge, Colorado), Journey (2003, Portillo, Chile), and Impact (2004, Bulgaria).

== Later years ==
Hardaway graduated with a bachelor's degree from Cornell University, where she studied business and Japanese (Dean's List recipient), was a Meinig Family Cornell National Scholar (MFCNS), and a member of Cornell's Varsity Women's Softball team. She went on to study photography at the Rocky Mountain School of Photography in Missoula, Montana and now she is a professional destination wedding photographer based out of Jackson, Wyoming.
