= Hilde Synnøve Lid =

Norwegian freestyle skier

Personal information
- Born: 18 March 1971 (age 55) Voss Municipality, Norway

Sport
- Country: Norway
- Sport: Freestyle skiing
- Club: Voss Freestyleklubb
Medal record
Representing Norway
Women's freestyle skiing
Olympic Games
Bronze medal – third place	1994 Lillehammer	Aerials
World Championships
Silver medal – second place	1999 Meiringen-Hasliberg	Aerials

Hilde Synnøve Lid (born 18 March 1971) is a Norwegian freestyle skier. Her achievements include winning an Olympic medal in aerials in 1994, a silver medal in aerials at the 1999 world championships, and placing third overall in aerials in the world cup in 2000.

== Career ==
Lid won a bronze medal in women's aerials at the 1994 Winter Olympics in Lillehammer. She finished 6th at the 1998 Winter Olympics in Nagano, and placed 16th at the 2002 Winter Olympics in Salt Lake City.

She won a silver medal in aerials at the FIS Freestyle World Ski Championships 1999.

She placed third overall in aerials in the 1999–2000 FIS Freestyle Skiing World Cup.

Representing the club Voss Freestyleklubb, she won two national titles during her career.

== Personal life ==
Lid was born in Voss Municipality on 18 March 1971.
