= National Alpine Museum of Australia =

Museum at Mount Buller, Victoria

- Location: Mount Buller, Victoria, Australia
- Coordinates: 37.145205°S 146.448525°E
- Accreditation: Victoria Museum Accreditation Program
- Website: www.nama.org.au

The National Alpine Museum of Australia is at Mount Buller, Victoria, Australia at the Mt Buller Community Centre, formerly the campus of La Trobe University. It is "a non-profit; membership supported Museum dedicated to collecting, preserving, and exhibiting elements from the broad spectrum of ski history for the purpose of research, education, and entertainment". It showcases a collection of ski memorabilia covering the evolution of alpine activities in Australia.
