= Jenny Eidolf =

Swedish freestyle skier

Personal information
- Nationality: Swedish
- Born: 1 August 1971 (age 53); Uppsala, Sweden

Sport
- Sport: Freestyle skiing

Jenny Eidolf (born 1 August 1971) is a Swedish freestyle skier. She competed in the women's moguls event at the 1998 Winter Olympics.
