= Alex Wilson (skier) =

American freestyle skier

Alex Wilson (born July 15, 1974) was an Olympic athlete on the U.S. Ski Team who competed in the freestyle skiing events of moguls and dual moguls.

In 55 World Cup starts, Wilson was on the podium twice, one of those a win in Moguls in Heavenly, California, on January 23, 1999. His best world ranking was 5th in 2000 in Moguls.

He placed 10th in Moguls in the 1998 Olympics, his only Olympic appearance. His best World Ski Championships result was 7th in Moguls in Meiringen-Hasliberg, Switzerland, on March 10, 1999.

Wilson graduated from the University of Colorado, Boulder, in 2005. Now he lives in Anchorage, Alaska.
