= Marja Elfman =

Swedish freestyle skier

Marja von Stedingk
Personal information
- Born: Marja Elfman; 5 August 1972 (age 53) Hällefors, Sweden
- Family: Hanna Aronsson Elfman (niece)

Sport
- Country: Sweden
- Sport: Freestyle skiing

Marja von Stedingk (born Marja Elfman 5 August 1972) is a Swedish freestyle skier. She was born in Hällefors. She competed at the 1998 Winter Olympics, in women's moguls. Elfman competed at the FIS Freestyle World Ski Championships 1997, where she placed 9th in moguls. She also competed at the FIS Freestyle World Ski Championships 1999, where she placed fourth in moguls and fifth in dual moguls.

She is the aunt of Swedish Olympic alpine skier Hanna Aronsson Elfman.
