= Tami Bradley =

Canadian freestyle skier (born 1970)

Personal information
- Born: 4 July 1970 (age 56) Vancouver, British Columbia, Canada

Sport
- Country: Canada
- Sport: Freestyle skiing
Medal record
Women's freestyle skiing
Representing Canada
World Championships
Bronze medal – third place	2001 Whistler-Blackcomb	Dual moguls

Tami Bradley (born 4 July 1970) is a Canadian freestyle skier. She was born in Vancouver, British Columbia. She competed at the 1998 Winter Olympics, in women's moguls. She also competed at the 2002 Winter Olympics in Salt Lake City.
