= Richard Gay (skier) =

French freestyle skier (born 1971)

Medal record

Representing France

Men's freestyle skiing

Olympic Games
Bronze medal – third place	2002 Salt Lake City	Moguls

Richard Gay (born 6 March 1971) is a French freestyle skier and Olympic medalist. He received a bronze medal at the 2002 Winter Olympics in Salt Lake City, in moguls.
