= Thony Hemery =

French freestyle skier

Personal information
- Nationality: French
- Born: 22 November 1972 (age 52); Bourg-Saint-Maurice, France

Sport
- Sport: Freestyle skiing

Anthony "Thony" Hemery (born 22 November 1972) is a French former freestyle skier. He competed in the men's moguls event at the 1998 Winter Olympics.
