= Nikki Stone =

American freestyle skier

Medal record

Women's Freestyle Skiing

Representing the United States

Olympic Games
Gold medal – first place	1998 Nagano	Aerials

FIS Freestyle World Ski Championships
Gold medal – first place	1995 La Clusaz	Aerials
Bronze medal – third place	1999 Meiringen-Hasliberg	Aerials

Nicole Stone (born February 4, 1971) is a former American Olympic skier. She was born in Princeton, New Jersey, and has resided in Beaufort, South Carolina.

Nikki Stone, who competed in the 1998 Winter Olympics in Nagano, Japan, is best known for being the first American to win a gold medal as inverted aerial skier. Aerial Skiing is a sport where athletes ski into a 10 feet (3.0 m) snow jump at approximately 40 miles per hour (64 km/h), flip and/or twist to a height of 50 feet (15 m) and land on a 45 degree hill.

Eighteen months before this second Olympic appearance, Stone sustained a career-threatening spinal injury in which doctors believed she would never jump again.

== Career highlights ==
In her career Stone has won 35 World Cup medals, 11 World Cup titles, four national titles, two year-long Aerial World Cup titles, and a World Championship title. She also became the first pure aerialist ever (male or female) to become the year-long Overall Freestyle World Cup Champion. At the 2002 Olympics, she carried the Olympic torch off the plane, along with Bill Spencer, that had brought it to the U.S. from Greece. She was inducted into the National Ski Hall of Fame in 2003.

== Television appearances ==
Late Night with David Letterman, the Today Show, Good Morning America, CNN Early Addition, MSNBC Morning Line, ESPN Magazine show, Fox News Channel Sports Express, CNN Business As Unusual, Fox Sports News live, the Late Late Show with Tom Snyder, and a televised commercial for Chevrolet and the Salt Lake Olympic Committee.

== Authored ==
Stone released the book, When Turtles Fly: Secrets of Successful People Who Know How to Stick Their Necks Out in January 2010. It intertwines her success story around inspirational stories from contributors like Shaun White, Tommy Hilfiger, Lindsey Vonn, Stephen Covey, and Prince Albert. Stone and the book were highlighted on the Today Show shortly after its release. Stone has written articles for Yahoo! Sports, the United States Olympic Committee, local newspapers, and skiing magazines. She is a contributing author to the book "Awaken the Olympian Within: Stories from America's Greatest Olympic Motivators".

== Personal life ==
Stone has an undergraduate degree from Union College in New York, graduating Magna Cum Laude. She has a master's degree in sports psychology from the University of Utah, graduating summa cum laude. In 2008, she gave birth to a daughter named Zali. In 2011, she gave birth to a son named Zealand. As of 2025, she lives in Beaufort, South Carolina (near Charleston).

== Current career ==
Stone currently works as a motivational speaker, author, coach for the new Regional Biggest Loser program (in Wichita, Kansas). She has also worked as a visiting professor at the University of Utah and a sports psychology consultant for several elite and Olympic athletes. Stone was hired by the United States Olympic Committee to work with the Winter Olympians in overcoming adversities and distractions, dealing with intense pressure, and developing confidence to compete in the 2010 Vancouver Games.

== Medals ==
An overview of medals won by Stone at important championships, listing the years in which she won each:

Championships	Gold medal	Silver medal	Bronze medal
Winter Olympics - Aerials	1998		
World Championships - Aerials	1995		1999
World Cup Freestyle Overall	1998		
World Cup Aerial Overall	1995; 1998	1999	1993; 1994
World Cups	1998/1999 (1x); 1997/1998 (4x); 1995/1996 (1x); 1994/1995 (4x); 1991/1992 (1x)	1998/1999 (1x); 1997/1998 (3x); 1996/1997 (2x); 1995/1996 (4x); 1994/1995 (3x); 1993/1994 (2x); 1991/1992 (2x)	1995/1996 (2x); 1994/1995 (2x); 1993/1994 (1x); 1992/1993 (2x)
US Championships	1993 (Aerials); 1994 (Aerials); 1995 (Aerials); 1998 (Aerials)	1997 (Aerial); 1992 (Aerial)	1993 (Combined); 1995 (Combined)
