= Yugo Tsukita =

Japanese freestyle skier (born 1976)

Personal information
- Born: July 18, 1976 (age 50) Ishikari, Japan

Sport
- Sport: Skiing

World Cup career
- Indiv. podiums: 11
- Indiv. wins: 1
Medal record
Men's freestyle skiing
Representing Japan
World Championships
Silver medal – second place	2003 Deer Valley	Dual moguls
- Updated on March 2, 2013

Yugo Tsukita (附田雄剛, Tsukita Yūgo; born July 18, 1976 in Ishikari) is a Japanese freestyle skier, specializing in moguls.

Tsukita competed at the 1998, 2002, 2006 and 2010 Winter Olympics for Japan. His best performance came in 2002, when he qualified for the moguls final, finishing 16th. He also advanced to the final in 2010, finishing 17th. In 1998, he finished 18th in the qualifying round, and did not advance. In 2006, he finished 33rd in the qualifying round, and did not advance.

As of February 2013, he has won one medal at the World Championships, a silver in the 2003 dual moguls event.

Tsukita made his World Cup debut in January 1995. As of February 2013, he has won one World Cup event, a Dual Moguls competition at Madarao in 1999/00. Altogether, he has eleven World Cup medals, his first coming at Blackcomb in 1996/97. His best World Cup finish is 10th, in 2008/09.

== World Cup podiums ==
Date	Location	Rank	Event
January 18, 1997	Blackcomb	2nd place, silver medalist(s)	Dual moguls
January 24, 1998	Blackcomb	3rd place, bronze medalist(s)	Moguls
January 29, 2000	Madarao	1st place, gold medalist(s)	Dual moguls
February 5, 2000	Inawashiro	2nd place, silver medalist(s)	Moguls
March 16, 2000	Livigno	3rd place, bronze medalist(s)	Dual moguls
February 10, 2001	Iizuna Kogen	2nd place, silver medalist(s)	Dual moguls
March 3, 2002	Inawashiro	3rd place, bronze medalist(s)	Moguls
March 9, 2002	Madarao	3rd place, bronze medalist(s)	Dual moguls
December 14, 2005	Tignes	2nd place, silver medalist(s)	Moguls
February 17, 2007	Inawashiro	3rd place, bronze medalist(s)	Moguls
February 7, 2009	Cypress Mountain	2nd place, silver medalist(s)	Moguls
