= Britt Swartley =

American freestyle skier

Personal information
- Born: August 3, 1971 (age 54) Lansdale, Pennsylvania, United States

Sport
- Sport: Freestyle skiing

Britt Swartley (born August 3, 1971) is an American freestyle skier. He competed in the men's aerials event at the 1998 Winter Olympics.
