= Evan Dybvig =

American freestyle skier

Evan Dybvig (born July 29, 1975) was an athlete on the U.S. Ski Team; he competed in the freestyle skiing events of moguls and dual moguls.

== United States Ski Team ==
Dybvig's first World Cup was on December 15, 1994, in Tignes, France, where he placed 19th in Moguls. In his third World Cup, he got his first podium, a 2nd in Moguls at Breckenridge, Colorado, on January 14, 1995. Sergei Shupletsov of Russia won.

Dybvig competed in three FIS Freestyle World Ski Championships (1997, 1999, 2001), and his best finishes were 6th in Moguls in Whistler, Canada in 2001, and 7th in Moguls in Iizuna Kogen, Japan in 1997.

Of his 54 World Cup starts, he had seven podiums, placing 2nd five times and 3rd twice. His best world ranking was 7th in both 2000 and 2001.

Dybvig competed in two Olympics, placing 31st in Moguls in 1998 and 28th in Moguls in 2002.

== Later years ==
Dybvig was part owner of Whaleback (ski area) in Enfield, New Hampshire, and is now the head of their freestyle skiing team.
