= Elena Batalova =

Russian freestyle skier

Personal information
- Nationality: Russian
- Born: 27 August 1964 (age 61)

Sport
- Country: Russia
- Sport: Freestyle skiing
Medal record
Women's freestyle skiing
Representing Russia
World Championships
Gold medal – first place	1995 La Clusaz	Ski ballet

Elena Alekseyevna Batalova (Russian: Еле́на Алексе́евна Бата́лова) (born 27 August 1964) is a Russian freestyle skier.

She won a gold medal in ski ballet at the FIS Freestyle World Ski Championships 1995 in La Clusaz. She also competed at the 1991, 1993, 1997 and 1999 world championships.
