= Andrew Capicik =

Canadian freestyle skier

Andrew Capicik (born 22 March 1973) is a Canadian freestyle skier. He was born in Toronto. He competed at the 1994 Winter Olympics in Lillehammer, where he placed fourth in aerials. He also competed at the 1998 Winter Olympics in Nagano and at the 2002 Winter Olympics in Salt Lake City.
