= Mount Buller, Victoria =

Mount Buller Village
- Town
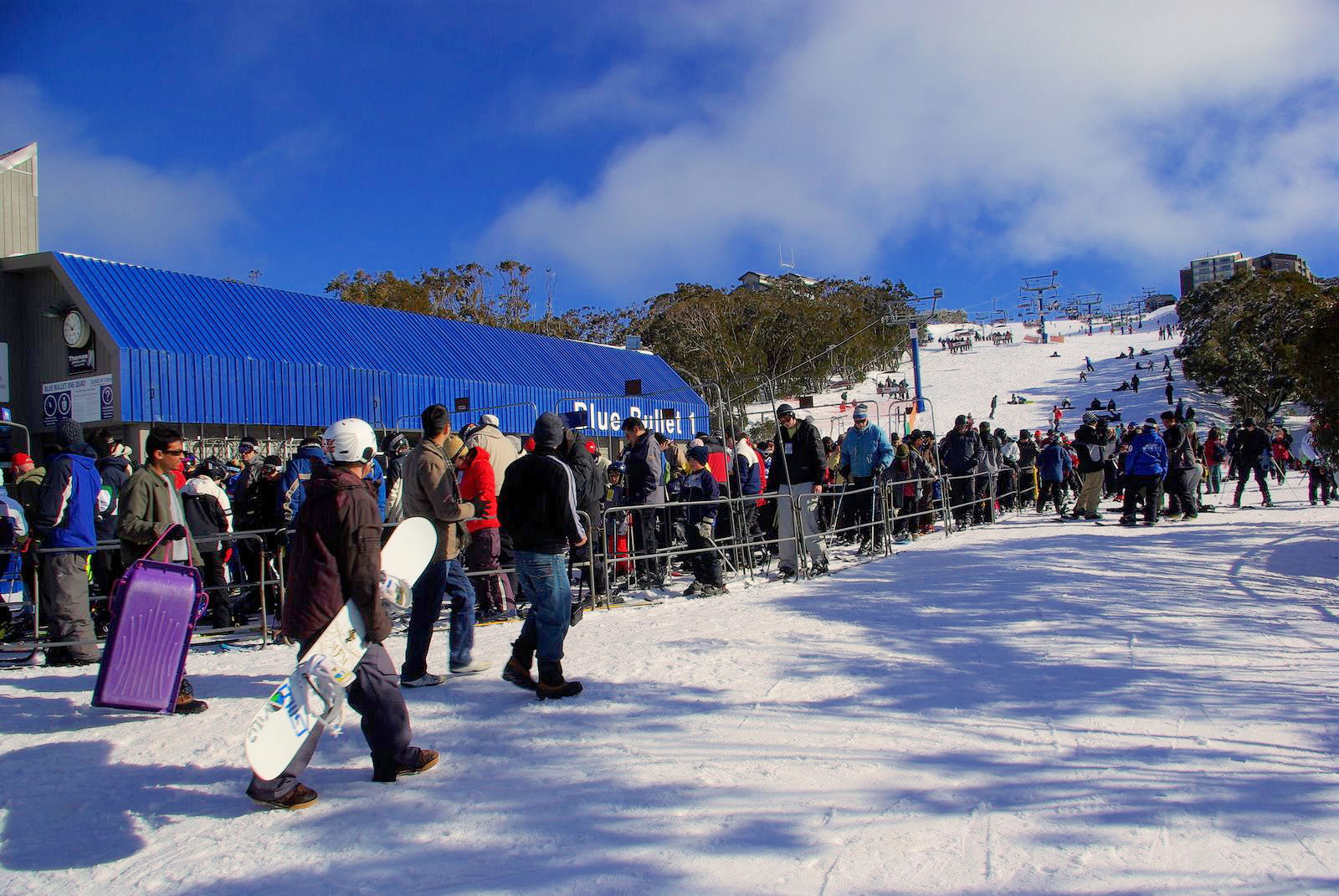
- Bourke St, the main series of lifts leading from the village towards the summit of Mount Buller

- Coordinates: 37°08′S 146°25′E
- Country: Australia
- State: Victoria
- Region: Hume, Unincorporated area
- LGAs: Shire of Mansfield; Mount Buller Alpine Resort
- Location: 208 km (129 mi) NE of Melbourne; 90 km (56 mi) SE of Mansfield; 62 km (39 mi) E of Jamieson

Government
  - State electorate: Eildon
  - Federal division: Indi
- Elevation: 1,600 m (5,200 ft)

Population
  - Total: 243 (2016 census)
- Postcode: 3723
- Mean max temp: 9.3 °C (48.7 °F)
- Mean min temp: 2.9 °C (37.2 °F)
- Annual rainfall: 1,486.1 mm (58.51 in)

Mount Buller is primarily a resort town on the slopes of Mount Buller, within Mount Buller Alpine Resort, an unincorporated area of the Australian state of Victoria. It is located approximately 208 kilometres (129 mi) northeast of Melbourne. It is popular with snowsports enthusiasts in winter due to its proximity to Melbourne. In the warmer months it is popular with visitors to the Victorian Alps and bike riders. At the 2016 census, Mount Buller had a population of 243.

== Mount Buller village ==
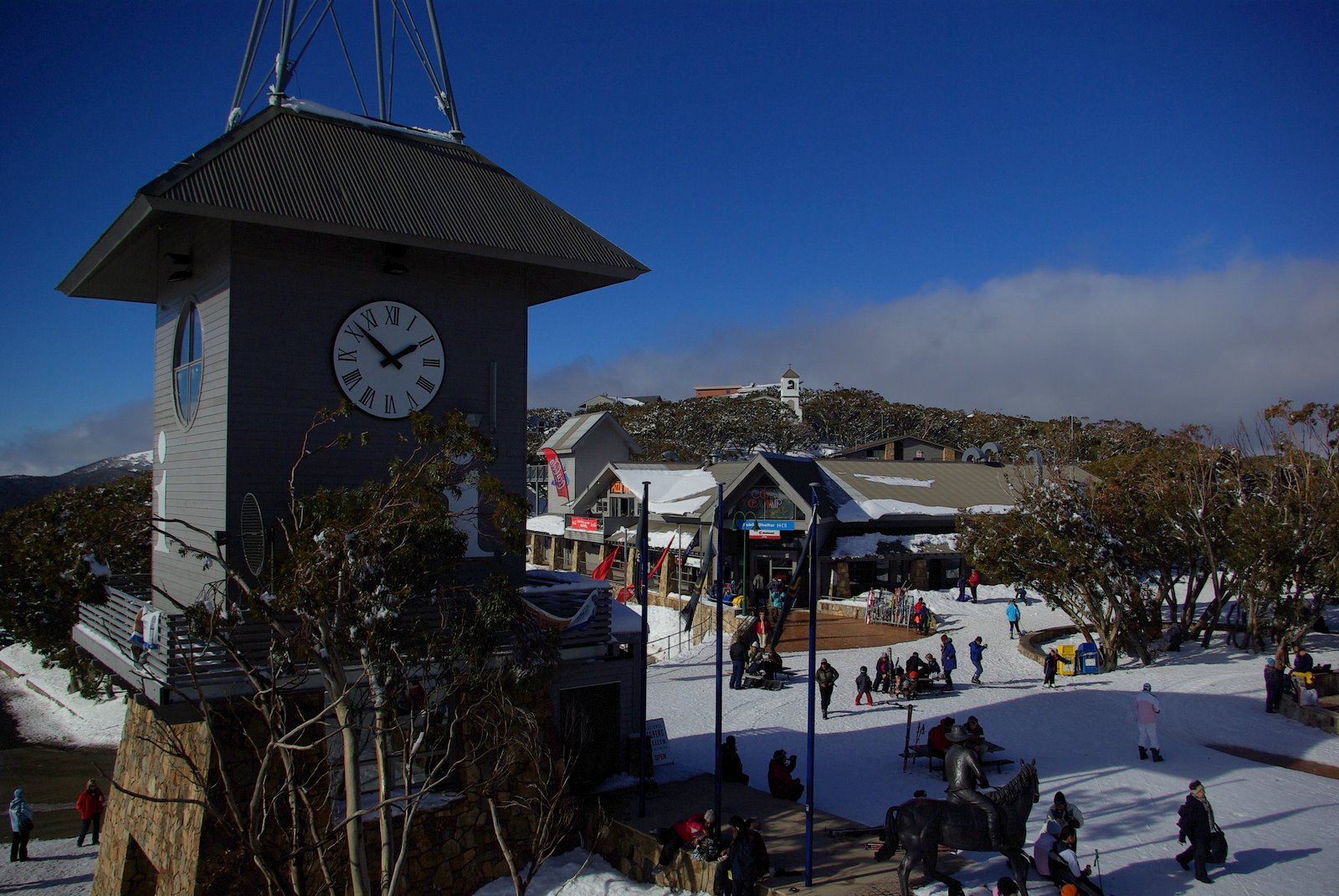
A view over the main part of the village.

The town has around 7000 beds available in accommodation facilities, the most of any Victorian ski resort. La Trobe University had a minor campus at Mount Buller. The campus facilities included a public cinema, gym and indoor sporting facilities. La Trobe has vacated the mountain, however the Resort Management Board is now using the building, better known as the Mount Buller Community Centre, as its home. All facilities are still operational, with the cinema, gym and sports hall open all year round. Mount Buller is also the home of the National Alpine Museum.

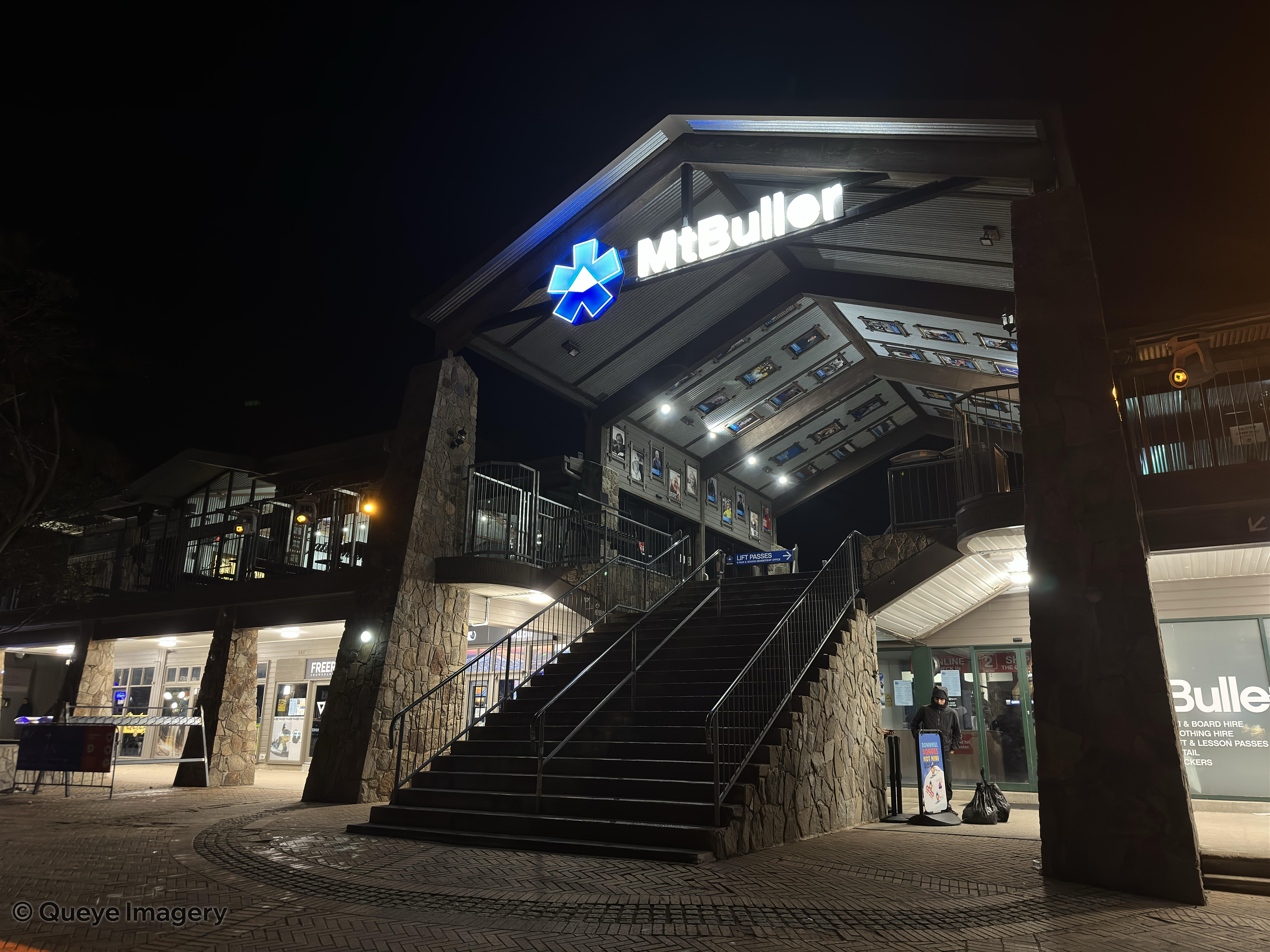
Mt. Buller Village Entrance at night

The area between Mount Buller and Mount Stirling is the primary catchment for the Delatite River.

== Sports and recreation ==
=== Mountain biking ===
Mount Buller is home to a growing number of first class Cross Country and Downhill mountain bike tracks. Between 2009 and 2012 many trails have been added, modified and upgraded by WORLD TRAIL. The chairlift for the downhill tracks is only open during the summer from Boxing Day until the end of January, although trailer shuttles also run until the end of February. Mt Buller is working towards developing the mountain as a world class mountain bike venue in line with what has been achieved at Whistler (Canada) and Queenstown (New Zealand). Retail outlets exist in the mountain village to enable casual riders to hire pushbikes, and for bike owners to access service should the need arise. The Victorian Downhill State Series holds a race each year at Mt Buller, as does the MTBA National Series.

The International Mountain Bicycling Association has designated the mountain biking trails at Mount Buller as a bronze-level IMBA Ride Center. .

=== Road cycling ===
Mount Buller is also a popular destination for road cyclists, due to the challenging climb from the tollbooth in Mirimbah to the Mount Buller Village. The climb is 15.3 kilometres (9.5 mi) long and has an average gradient of 6.2%. The final kilometre before the Village is the steepest part of the climb with several short sections of gradient 10%+.

=== Skiing, skateboarding, and hiking ===
Comprising 300 hectares (740 acres), the Mount Buller Alpine Resort is a year-round facility with peak operation during winter months for alpine sports. In the summer months, the area is a popular location for alpine hiking.

== Climate ==
Under the Köppen climate classification scheme, Mount Buller has a very cold Oceanic / Subpolar oceanic climate (Cfb / Cfc) under the −3 °C (27 °F) isotherm, or a Humid continental / Subarctic climate (Dfb / Dfc) under the 0 °C (32 °F) isotherm, with cool summers and cold, very snowy winters. On average, Mount Buller receives 67.6 snowy days annually, the greatest figure for any mainland Australian site.

Due to its far south-western location in the alpine region, Mount Buller is more susceptible to cold airmasses which allow it to record some of the lowest maximum temperatures and daytime readings in the country, despite being considerably lower in elevation than other mountain sites to the north-east. On 5 September 1995, a maximum temperature of just −6.2 °C (20.8 °F) was registered at Mount Buller; the same day at Thredbo Top Station saw a maximum of −6.0 °C (21.2 °F), some 250 metres (820 ft) higher than Buller. On 3 February 2023, at the height of summer, Mount Buller reached a top of just 0.9 °C (33.6 °F).

Climate data for Mount Buller (1985–2022, rainfall to 1948); 1,707 m AMSL; 37.15° S, 146.44° E
Month	Jan	Feb	Mar	Apr	May	Jun	Jul	Aug	Sep	Oct	Nov	Dec	Year
Record high °C (°F)	30.3 (86.5)	30.7 (87.3)	26.0 (78.8)	21.6 (70.9)	16.5 (61.7)	12.7 (54.9)	10.1 (50.2)	10.8 (51.4)	16.7 (62.1)	21.6 (70.9)	26.1 (79.0)	27.7 (81.9)	30.7 (87.3)
Mean daily maximum °C (°F)	17.6 (63.7)	17.1 (62.8)	14.2 (57.6)	9.9 (49.8)	6.1 (43.0)	3.2 (37.8)	1.4 (34.5)	2.0 (35.6)	4.9 (40.8)	8.7 (47.7)	12.3 (54.1)	14.7 (58.5)	9.3 (48.8)
Daily mean °C (°F)	13.4 (56.1)	13.0 (55.4)	10.5 (50.9)	6.8 (44.2)	3.6 (38.5)	1.0 (33.8)	−0.6 (30.9)	−0.3 (31.5)	2.1 (35.8)	5.1 (41.2)	8.5 (47.3)	10.6 (51.1)	6.1 (43.1)
Mean daily minimum °C (°F)	9.1 (48.4)	8.8 (47.8)	6.7 (44.1)	3.7 (38.7)	1.0 (33.8)	−1.3 (29.7)	−2.6 (27.3)	−2.5 (27.5)	−0.7 (30.7)	1.5 (34.7)	4.6 (40.3)	6.4 (43.5)	2.9 (37.2)
Record low °C (°F)	−3.5 (25.7)	−2.6 (27.3)	−4.5 (23.9)	−6.9 (19.6)	−6.9 (19.6)	−9.1 (15.6)	−10.2 (13.6)	−8.7 (16.3)	−8.4 (16.9)	−7.6 (18.3)	−5.8 (21.6)	−5.1 (22.8)	−10.2 (13.6)
Average precipitation mm (inches)	79.7 (3.14)	73.2 (2.88)	81.6 (3.21)	111.2 (4.38)	141.4 (5.57)	155.6 (6.13)	165.8 (6.53)	161.7 (6.37)	144.0 (5.67)	145.0 (5.71)	126.8 (4.99)	100.1 (3.94)	1,486.1 (58.52)
Average precipitation days (≥ 0.2 mm)	7.7	6.9	8.4	10.5	13.7	14.9	17.0	17.2	14.4	14.2	11.5	9.4	145.8
Average afternoon relative humidity (%)	66	66	69	79	85	89	90	91	87	78	71	68	78
Average dew point °C (°F)	8.1 (46.6)	8.0 (46.4)	6.4 (43.5)	4.3 (39.7)	1.8 (35.2)	−0.2 (31.6)	−1.3 (29.7)	−0.4 (31.3)	1.3 (34.3)	2.6 (36.7)	4.6 (40.3)	6.2 (43.2)	3.5 (38.2)
