= Heavenly Mountain Resort =

Ski resort in California, United States

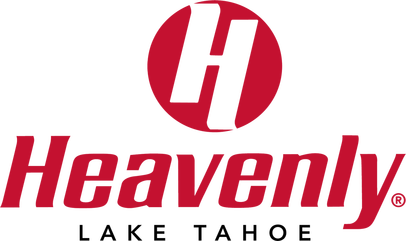

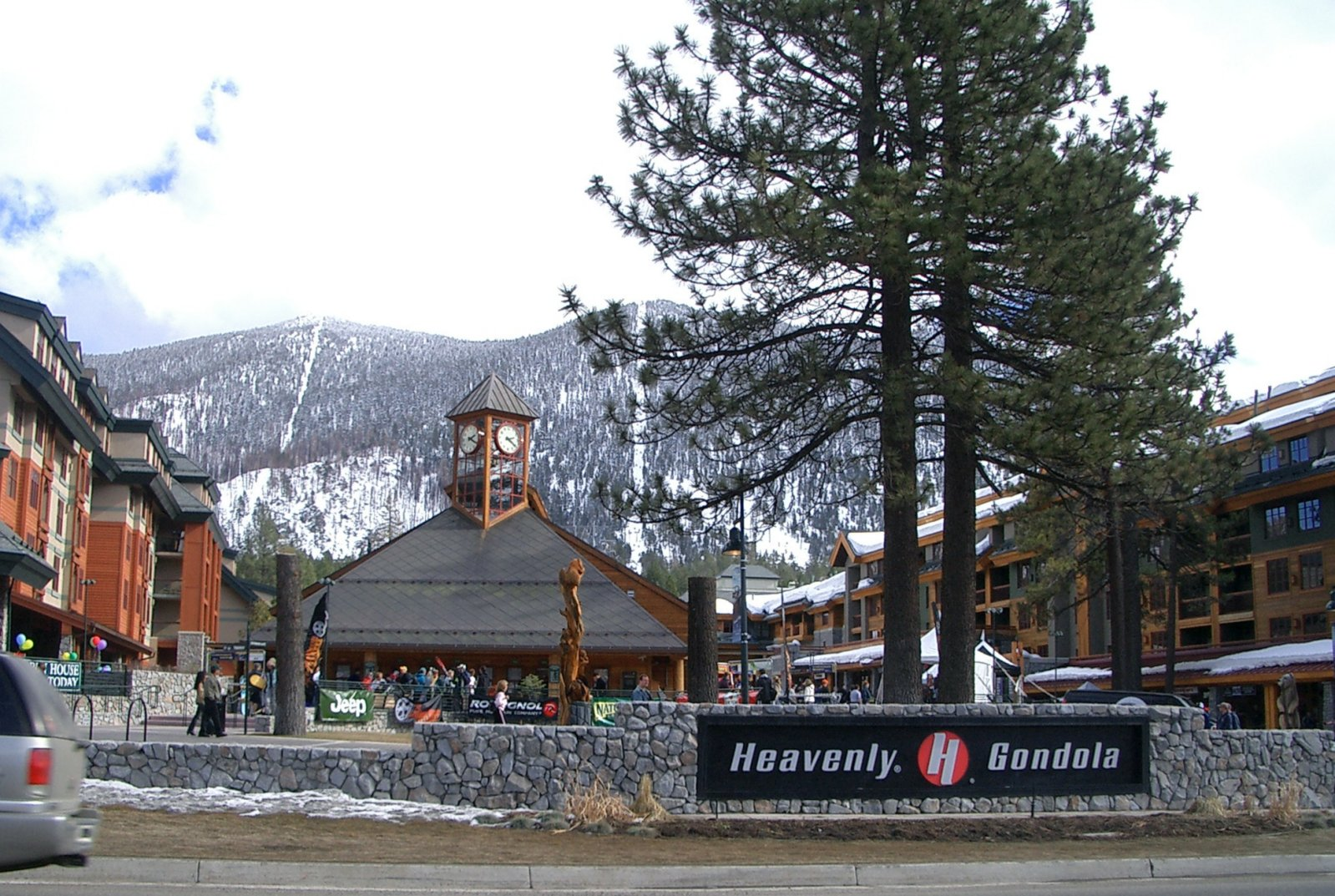
- The gondola lift base in South Lake Tahoe in 2005

- Location in the United States Location in California
- Location: El Dorado-Toiyabe National Forests; El Dorado County, California / Douglas County, Nevada/Alpine County, California
- Nearest city: South Lake Tahoe, California
- Coordinates: 38.9353°N 119.9400°W
- Status: Operating
- Owner: Vail Resorts
- Vertical: 3,812 ft (1,162 m)
- Top elevation: 10,067 ft (3,068 m)
- Base elevation: 6,255 ft (1,907 m)
- Skiable area: 4,800 acres (19.4 km^{2})
- Trails: 97 total 20% Easier; 45% More Difficult; 35% Most Difficult
- Longest run: 5.5 miles (8.9 km) (Olympic downhill)
- Lift system: 25 total: 1 high speed gondola, 1 aerial tram, 2 high speed six passenger chairs, 8 high speed quads, 1 fixed grip quad, 4 triples, 2 doubles, 2 surface, 4 magic carpets
- Lift capacity: 52,000 passengers/hr
- Terrain parks: 3 – Groove Park, Lakeview Park, Mombo Park
- Snowfall: 360 inches (30 ft; 9.1 m)
- Snowmaking: Yes
- Night skiing: No
- Website: www.SkiHeavenly.com

Heavenly Mountain Resort is a ski resort in the western United States, located on the California–Nevada border in southeastern Lake Tahoe in the Sierra Nevada mountain range. It opened as "Heavenly Valley" 71 years ago on December 15, 1955, and now has 97 runs and 30 lifts spread between four base facilities in both states. The resort has 4,800 acres (7.5 sq mi; 19.4 km^{2}) within its permit area, with approximately 33% currently developed for skiing, boasting the highest elevation of the Lake Tahoe area resorts at 10,067 feet (3,068 m) above sea level, with a maximum lift-served elevation of 10,040 feet (3,060 m).

Since 2002, Heavenly has been owned by Vail Resorts. With an average annual snowfall of 360 inches (30 ft; 9.1 m) and an extensive snowmaking system, the ski season usually runs for five months, from mid-November to mid-April.

== Incidents ==
Heavenly is notable as the resort where, in 1981, Michela Alioto-Pier, at age thirteen, was paralyzed from the waist down when she fell from the Ridge Lift and on 5 January 1998, Congressman and singer Sonny Bono died after hitting a tree. On August 31, 2009, 1 person was killed and another was injured after falling from a chairlift at the resort.

== Lifts ==
Heavenly, CA/NV - Current Operating Lifts
Lift Name	Manufacturer	Year built	Capacity
Big Easy	Doppelmayr CTEC (4-CLF)	2003	1600 pph
Canyon Express	Doppelmayr CTEC (4-CLD)	2003	2600 pph
Comet Express	Doppelmayr (4-CLD)	1988	2800 pph
Dipper Express	Doppelmayr (4-CLD)	1994	2800 pph
Galaxy	Doppelmayr (3-CLF)	2018	1800 pph
Heavenly Gondola	Doppelmayr (8-MGD)	2000	2800 pph
Gunbarrel Express	Doppelmayr (4-CLD)	1998	2660 pph
Mott Canyon	Doppelmayr (2-CLF)	1991	1000 pph
North Bowl Express	Doppelmayr (4-CLD)	2022	2400 pph
Olympic Express	Doppelmayr CTEC (4-CLD)	2007	2400 pph
Powderbowl Express	Doppelmayr CTEC (6-CLD)	2004	3600 pph
Sky Express	Doppelmayr (4-CLD)	1992	2400 pph
Stagecoach Express	Doppelmayr (4-CLD)	1998	2800 pph
Tamarack Express	Doppelmayr (6-CLD)	1997	2400 pph
Aerial Tram	VonRoll (50 Tram)	1984	650 pph
Boulder	Yan/Riblet (3-CLF)	1988	1800 pph
First Ride	Yan (3-CLF)	1998	Unknown
Groove	Yan (3-CLF)	1992	Unknown
Patsy's	Yan (3-CLF)	1982	2000 pph
World Cup	SLI (2-CLF)	1969	900 pph

Heavenly's lifts mostly consist of Doppelmayr detachable chairlifts. Some older Yan and Riblet fixed grips still remain.

There is a gondola linking Heavenly Village from the actual resort.

== Climate ==
Climate data for Monument Peak (CA) 38.9255 N, 119.9021 W, Elevation: 9,669 ft (2,947 m) (1991–2020 normals)
Month	Jan	Feb	Mar	Apr	May	Jun	Jul	Aug	Sep	Oct	Nov	Dec	Year
Mean daily maximum °F (°C)	34.2 (1.2)	33.5 (0.8)	36.5 (2.5)	40.8 (4.9)	48.9 (9.4)	59.0 (15.0)	68.2 (20.1)	67.5 (19.7)	61.3 (16.3)	51.2 (10.7)	39.9 (4.4)	33.7 (0.9)	47.9 (8.8)
Daily mean °F (°C)	26.0 (−3.3)	24.6 (−4.1)	26.9 (−2.8)	30.1 (−1.1)	38.0 (3.3)	47.1 (8.4)	55.9 (13.3)	55.2 (12.9)	49.2 (9.6)	40.2 (4.6)	31.2 (−0.4)	25.7 (−3.5)	37.5 (3.1)
Mean daily minimum °F (°C)	17.8 (−7.9)	15.7 (−9.1)	17.3 (−8.2)	19.4 (−7.0)	27.0 (−2.8)	35.3 (1.8)	43.7 (6.5)	42.9 (6.1)	37.1 (2.8)	29.2 (−1.6)	22.5 (−5.3)	17.7 (−7.9)	27.1 (−2.7)
Average precipitation inches (mm)	5.94 (151)	5.16 (131)	5.38 (137)	3.15 (80)	2.45 (62)	0.93 (24)	0.39 (9.9)	0.38 (9.7)	0.61 (15)	1.80 (46)	3.32 (84)	6.07 (154)	35.58 (903.6)
Source: PRISM Climate Group

Climate data for Heavenly Valley, California, 1991–2020 normals: 8582ft (2616m)
Month	Jan	Feb	Mar	Apr	May	Jun	Jul	Aug	Sep	Oct	Nov	Dec	Year
Mean daily maximum °F (°C)	39.0 (3.9)	38.7 (3.7)	42.2 (5.7)	45.5 (7.5)	52.5 (11.4)	60.6 (15.9)	68.7 (20.4)	67.8 (19.9)	62.4 (16.9)	52.9 (11.6)	43.7 (6.5)	37.8 (3.2)	51.0 (10.6)
Daily mean °F (°C)	29.3 (−1.5)	28.2 (−2.1)	31.1 (−0.5)	34.3 (1.3)	41.5 (5.3)	49.1 (9.5)	56.7 (13.7)	55.7 (13.2)	50.9 (10.5)	42.3 (5.7)	33.8 (1.0)	28.5 (−1.9)	40.1 (4.5)
Mean daily minimum °F (°C)	19.6 (−6.9)	17.7 (−7.9)	20.0 (−6.7)	23.1 (−4.9)	30.5 (−0.8)	37.6 (3.1)	44.6 (7.0)	43.5 (6.4)	39.2 (4.0)	31.7 (−0.2)	23.9 (−4.5)	19.1 (−7.2)	29.2 (−1.5)
Average precipitation inches (mm)	5.65 (144)	5.18 (132)	5.20 (132)	2.94 (75)	2.43 (62)	0.85 (22)	0.36 (9.1)	0.37 (9.4)	0.60 (15)	1.81 (46)	3.30 (84)	5.85 (149)	34.54 (879.5)
Source 1: XMACIS2
Source 2: NOAA (Precipitation)
