= Natalia Razumovskaya =

Russian freestyle skier

Personal information
- Nationality: Russian
- Born: 18 August 1975 (age 50)

Sport
- Country: Russia
- Sport: Freestyle skiing
Medal record
Women's freestyle skiing
Representing Russia
World Championships
Gold medal – first place	1999 Meiringen-Hasliberg	Ski ballet

Natalia Viktorovna Razumovskaya (Russian: Ната́лья Ви́кторовна Разумо́вская; born 18 August 1975) is a Russian freestyle skier.

She won a gold medal at the FIS Freestyle World Ski Championships 1999 in Meiringen-Hasliberg.
