= Sandra Schmitt =

German freestyle skier

- Sandra Schmitt after winning her Gold Medal in 1999

Personal information
- Nationality: German
- Born: 26 April 1981 Mörfelden, West Germany
- Died: 11 November 2000 (aged 19) Kaprun, Austria

Sport
- Country: Germany
- Sport: Freestyle skiing
- Events: Moguls, Dual Moguls
Medal record
Women's freestyle skiing
Representing Germany
Freestyle World Ski Championships
| Gold medal – first place | 1999 Meiringen-Hailberg | Dual moguls |

Sandra Schmitt (April 26, 1981 – November 11, 2000) was a German freestyle skier. In 1998, she came 9th in the Women's Moguls contest at the 1998 Winter Olympics in Nagano. She became the Women's Dual Moguls World Champion in 1999. Schmitt died with her parents in the Kaprun disaster on 11 November 2000.
