= Eric Bergoust =

American freestyle skier

Personal information
- Born: August 27, 1969 (age 56) Missoula, Montana, U.S.
Medal record
Men's freestyle skiing
Representing the United States
Olympic Games
Gold medal – first place	1998 Nagano	Aerials
FIS Freestyle World Ski Championships
Gold medal – first place	1999 Meiringen-Hasliberg	Aerials
Silver medal – second place	1997 Iizuna Kogen	Aerials

Eric Bergoust (born August 27, 1969) is an American freestyle skier. In 1998 Bergoust participated at the 1998 Winter Olympics held in Nagano, Japan where he won a gold medal in the freestyle ski jump (aerials).

Bergoust was born in Missoula, Montana. He has competed in aerials at four successive Winter Olympics. In addition to the gold medal in 1998, he finished 7th in 1994, 12th in 2002, and 17th in 2006.

He is one of five people known to have performed a quadruple flip on snow, along with Frank Bare, Jr., Lloyd Langlois, Matt Chojnacki and Nicolas Fontaine.
