= Tae Satoya =

Japanese freestyle skier (born 1976)

Personal information
- Born: June 12, 1976 (age 50) Sapporo, Hokkaido, Japan
Medal record
Women's freestyle skiing
Representing Japan
Olympic Games
Gold medal – first place	1998 Nagano	Moguls
Bronze medal – third place	2002 Salt Lake City	Moguls

Tae Satoya (里谷 多英, Satoya Tae; born June 12, 1976, in Sapporo) is a Japanese freestyle skier. She won the Olympic title in the moguls event at the 1998 Winter Olympics, and she finished third at the 2002 games.

== Olympic career ==
Satoya became the first Japanese woman to earn a gold medal in the Winter Olympics after winning a gold medal in the Moguls event at the 1998 Nagano Olympics.

Satoya went on to win a further Bronze medal at the Moguls event in 2002 at Salt Lake City.

She also competed at the 2006 Winter Olympics where she finished in 15th place, and finally in the 2010 Olympics where, reportedly suffering from back problems she finished 19th after falling on her last jump.

== Scandal ==
Satoya was banned by the Ski Association of Japan from participating in the 2005 Freestyle World Ski Championships in Finland following a scandal resulting from an arrest at a Roppongi nightclub
