= Janne Lahtela =

Finnish freestyle skier

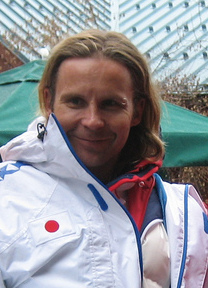
- Lahtela in 2010

Medal record

Men's freestyle skiing

Representing Finland

Olympic Games
Gold medal – first place	2002 Salt Lake City	Moguls
Silver medal – second place	1998 Nagano	Moguls

FIS Freestyle World Ski Championships
Gold medal – first place	1999 Meiringen-Hasliberg	Moguls
Silver medal – second place	1999 Meiringen-Hasliberg	Dual Moguls

Janne Lahtela (born 28 February 1974) is a Finnish former athlete, who established himself as one of the most dominant persons in the history of moguls skiing. He is currently the head coach of Japan's freestyle skiing team. He also is a key founder and sponsor for the IDOne ski company based out of Japan.

Lahtela was born in Kemijärvi. He won a gold medal in the moguls final of 2002 Winter Olympic Games. Four years earlier he had taken a silver medal in front of his cousin Sami Mustonen, who took bronze. He has also won the moguls skiing World Cup five times and became a World Champion in 1999.
