= Dominick Gauthier =

Canadian freestyle skier

Personal information
- Born: 31 August 1973 (age 52) Lévis, Quebec, Canada

Sport
- Sport: Freestyle skiing

Dominick Gauthier (born 31 August 1973) is a Canadian freestyle skier. He competed in the men's moguls event at the 1998 Winter Olympics.
