= Veronica Brenner =

Canadian freestyle skier

Medal record

Women's freestyle skiing

Representing Canada

Olympic Games
Silver medal – second place	2002 Salt Lake City	Aerials

FIS Freestyle World Ski Championships
Bronze medal – third place	1997 Iizuna Kogen	Aerials

Veronica Brenner (born October 18, 1974) is a Canadian freestyle skier and Olympic medallist. She was born in Scarborough, Ontario. She won the silver medal at the 2002 Winter Olympics in Salt Lake City, in aerials (freestyle ski jump).

She finished first in the 1996-1997 World Cup Grand Prix.
