= Mont Tremblant Resort =

Year-round resort in Québec, Canada

Mont Tremblant Ski Resort

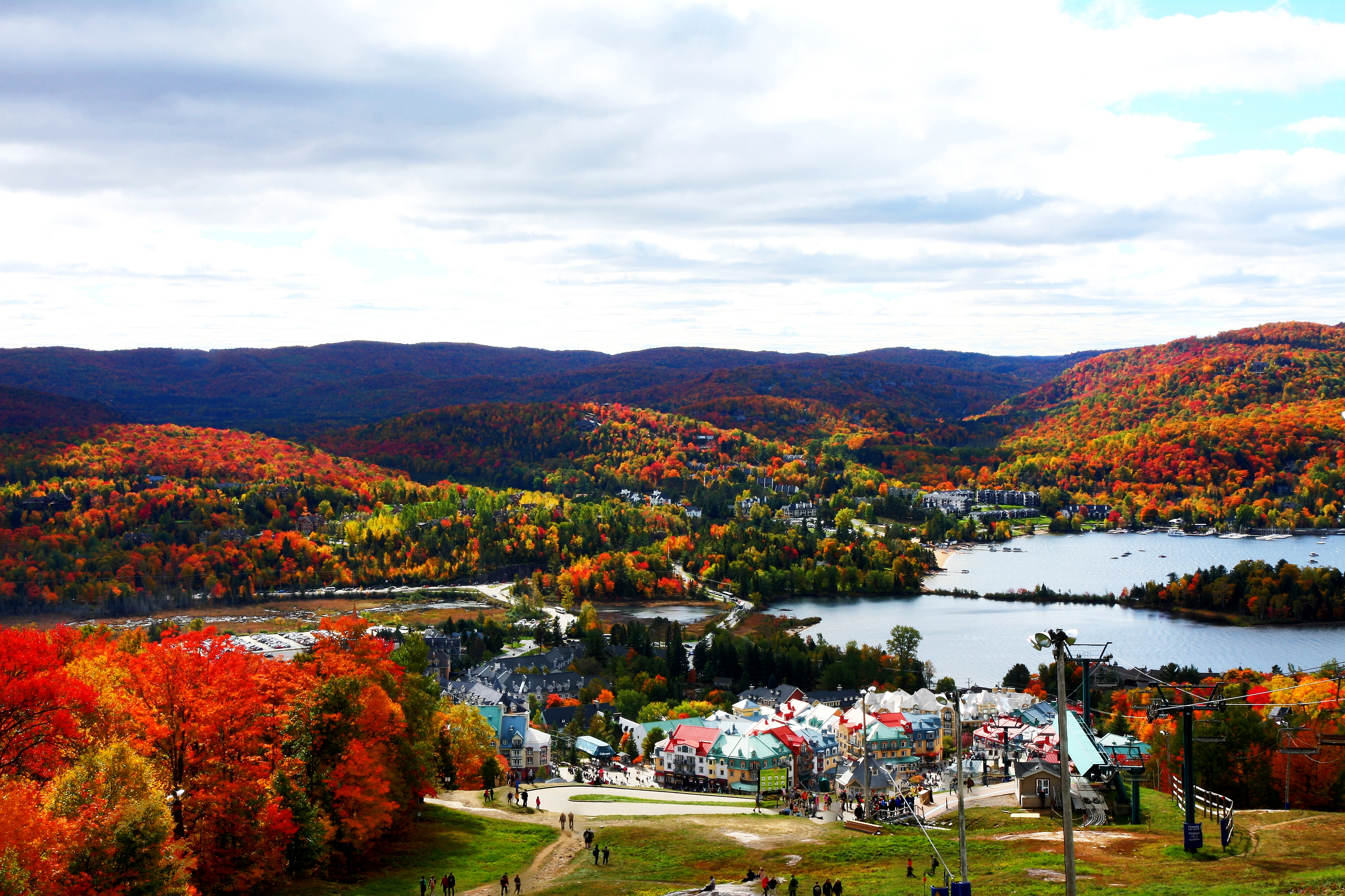
- View of Mont Tremblant Resort

- Location of Mont-Tremblant in Quebec
- Location: Mont-Tremblant, Quebec, Canada
- Nearest city: Montreal: 130 km (80 mi)
- Coordinates: 46°12′50″N 074°35′06″W
- Status: Operating
- Owner: Alterra Mountain Company
- Vertical: 645 m (2,116 ft)
- Top elevation: 875 m (2,871 ft)
- Base elevation: 230 m (755 ft)
- Skiable area: 2.53 km^{2} (630 acres)
- Trails: 102 (total) (easy): 22 (difficult): 34 (more difficult): 42 (extreme): 15
- Longest run: 6 km (4 mi) (Nansen)
- Lift system: 15 total 2 gondolas (including Télécabine Casino Express), 9 chairlifts, 3 magic carpets 1 Cabriolet
- Lift capacity: 27,230 skiers/hr
- Snowfall: 452 cm (178 in) per year
- Snowmaking: Yes, 71%
- Website: https://www.tremblant.ca/

Mont Tremblant Ski Resort (commonly referred to as Tremblant) is a year-round resort in the Laurentian Mountains of Quebec, Canada, located about 130 km (80 mi) northwest of Montreal. It is best known as a ski destination, but also features Lake Tremblant suitable for swimming and two golf courses in the summer months. The name of the mountain, Mont Tremblant, was derived from the Algonquin indigenous people, who called it the "trembling mountain." The summit is at an elevation of 875 m (2,871 ft), which makes it one of the tallest peaks in the Laurentians. One km north of the principal down hill area is the Edge, an area of glade skiing and 2.8 km (1.7 mi). The resort is owned by Alterra Mountain Company.

The mountain and resort are part of the Mont-Tremblant National Park and are both located near the village of Mont-Tremblant.

Mont Tremblant Ski Resort has consistently been ranked the #1 ski resort in Eastern North America with a ski area of over 817 acres (After Timber Expansion).

== History ==
Joseph Bondurant Ryan, an explorer from a wealthy American family from Philadelphia, came to the region prospecting gold in 1938. Accompanied by Harry Wheeler (founder of the Gray Rocks Inn in Mont Tremblant) and Lowell Thomas, an American journalist, they climbed to the summit of Mont Tremblant with skis wrapped in seal skins for traction. After an exhausting trek to the summit, it is said that Joseph Ryan vowed to transform the landscape into a world-class alpine village. Only one year later, his dream was realized. On February 12, 1939, Joseph Ryan opened the Mont Tremblant Lodge, which remains part of the pedestrian village today.

In its early years, Lowell Thomas, the American radio broadcaster, was an avid skier who helped popularize the resort by broadcasting shows from the site, thereby establishing the resort as a prime destination for skiers. The resort named a triple ski lift, which is located on the north mountainside, and trails after him as well as other early devotees.

Following the sudden death of Joseph Bondurant Ryan in 1950, the Mont Tremblant ski resort was operated by his wife Mary Rutherfoord Johnson Ryan until 1965, when it was sold to local Quebec entrepreneurs led by André Charron. They ran the resort until 1979, when they sold it to La Société des Caisses d'Entraide Économique. They ran the resort for four years until it went into bankruptcy. The resort was then bought in 1983 by Louis-Pierre Lapointe, who in turn sold it in 1991 to Intrawest.

Intrawest immediately expanded the pedestrian resort village with architecture reminiscent of traditional Quebec and built new ski lifts, including a gondola. Other changes included building the Grand Manitou summit lodge. In 2009, a casino located at the base of the Soleil trails was opened. The casino is serviced by an 8-passenger gondola that runs from the main resort to the casino.

Joseph Bondurant Ryan is buried next to the St. Bernard Chapel that he built in 1940-41 at the base of the alpine village, along with his wife Mary and son Peter Ryan, who died in Paris in 1962 at the age of 22 as a result of an auto racing accident. Peter Ryan was an accomplished champion skier who had been named to the Canadian Olympic ski team, but he had switched to auto racing after a 1959 skiing accident. He quickly showed tremendous talent in auto racing, and he was the first Canadian in Formula One racing and the winner of the first Canadian Grand Prix held at Mosport in 1961.

On March 16, 2009, actress Natasha Richardson sustained a head injury when she fell while taking a beginner skiing lesson at the resort. She died two days later in New York City.

Since Alterra took ownership of the resort in 2018, the resort has seen some major investments. During the summer of 2018, the Manitou Chalet located at the top of the mountain received significant improvements. For the winter of 2018-2019, a new high-speed quad ski lift was installed to replace the old Lowell Thomas Lift. The total number of trails is now 102, with several new glade areas. Alterra has recently announced another $42.5 million (CAD) investment for the next 2 seasons with new developments taking place on the Soleil Side, including a new hotel, new beginner area, and new lift serviced terrain on the Timber Summit.

In the 2023/24 winter season, the resort integrated Radio-Frequency Identification (RFID) for ski gate access.

== Lifts ==
Lift Name	Length	Type	Hourly Capacity	Mountain Face	Make	Year
Télécabine Express Express Gondola	2569m	8 person gondola	2800	South/Sud	Doppelmayr	1998
Télécabine Casino Express Casino Express Gondola	1557m	8 person gondola	1300	Village	Doppelmayr	2009
Flying Mile Express	1202m	High speed quad	2800	South/Sud	Doppelmayr	1994
TGV	1350m	High speed quad	2400	South/Sud	Poma	1993
Porte du Soleil	750m	Triple	1800	South/Sud	Doppelmayr	1980
Tapis Magique Équilibre 1 Équilibre Magic Carpet 1	68m	Magic carpet	1000	South/Sud	Unknown	Unknown
Tapis Magique Équilibre 2 Équilibre Magic Carpet 2	120m	Magic carpet	1000	South/Sud	Unknown	Unknown
Tapis Magique Onésime Onésime Magic Carpet	72m	Magic carpet	1000	South/Sud	Unknown	Unknown
Le Soleil	2000m	High speed quad	2800	Soleil	Doppelmayr	1988
Duncan Express	2000m	High speed quad	2400	North/Nord	Doppelmayr	1991
Lowell Thomas Express	1037m	High speed quad	2400	North/Nord	Doppelmayr	2018
Expo Express	1400m	High speed quad	2400	North/Nord	Poma	1993
Edge	1347m	Fixed-grip quad	2000	Edge	Doppelmayr	1985
Cabriolet	321m	6 person open-air gondola	2200	Village	Doppelmayr	1994
Hymne des Trembles	411m	Fixed-grip quad	2000	Soleil	Doppelmayr	2025
Tapis Magique Orée Orée Magic Carpet (subject to change)	TBA	Magic Carpet	TBA	Soleil	TBA	2026
Timber Express (subject to change)	1800m	High speed quad	2400	Soleil	TBA	2027

== Resort facilities ==
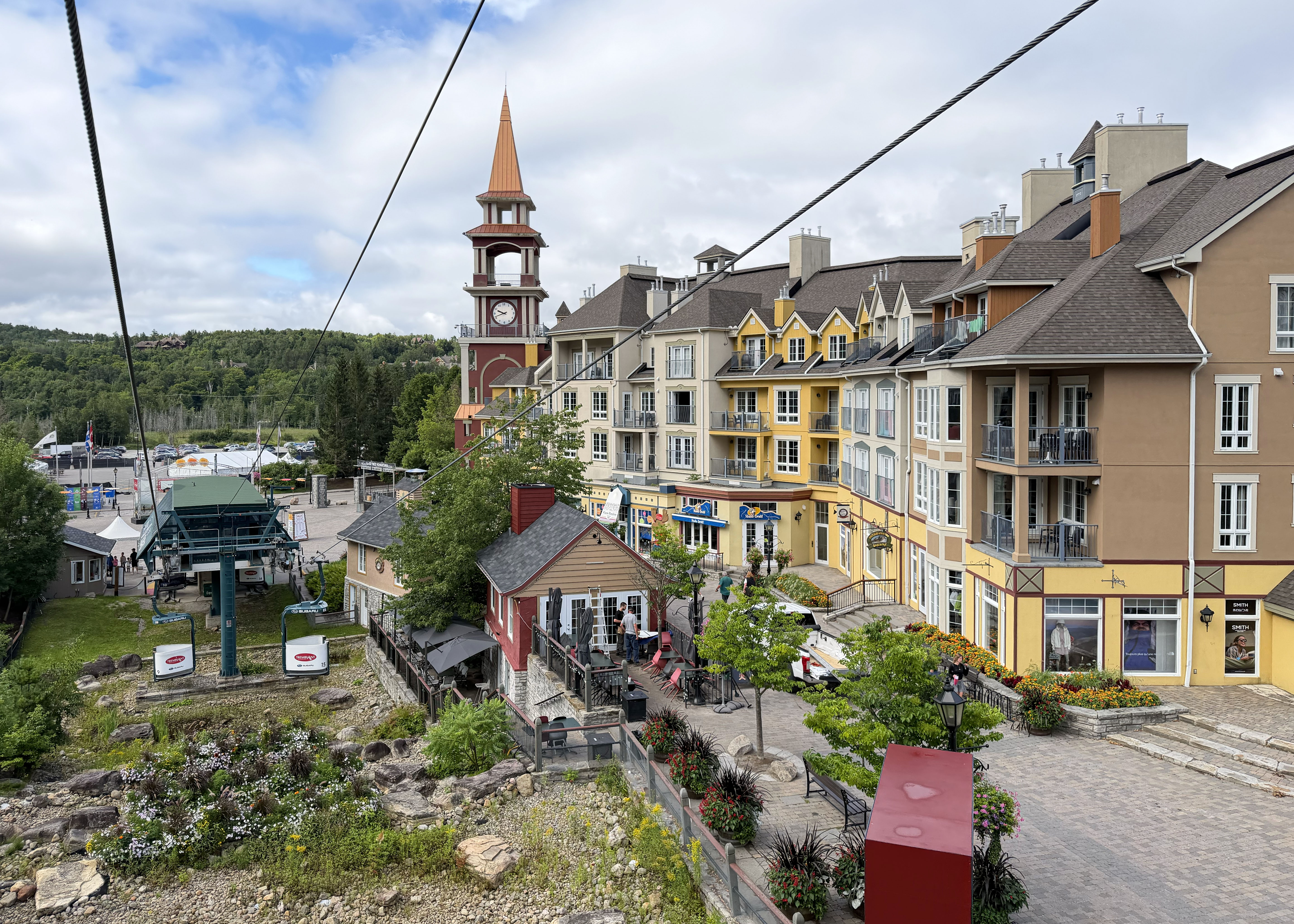
Pedestrian village at Mont Tremblant

The resort is located within Mont-Tremblant National Park, a Quebec provincial park in the Laurentian Mountains. The top of the mountain has a chalet and cafeteria, Le Grand Manitou, open winter and summer. The base of the North Side also has a chalet and cafeteria called La Fourchette du Diable, it also has a rental store and it is only open for the winter. On the Soleil side there is a small café mid mountain called Le Refuge du Trappeur. At the base of the south side there is many different food options in the Pedestrian Village.

=== Pedestrian Village ===
An open-air gondola called the Cabriolet connects the upper and lower parts of the pedestrian village. From the top of this lift, the main gondola is available to take skiers to the summit of the mountain. There is also a ski trail running through the village for skiers to access the lower level of the village and transportation.

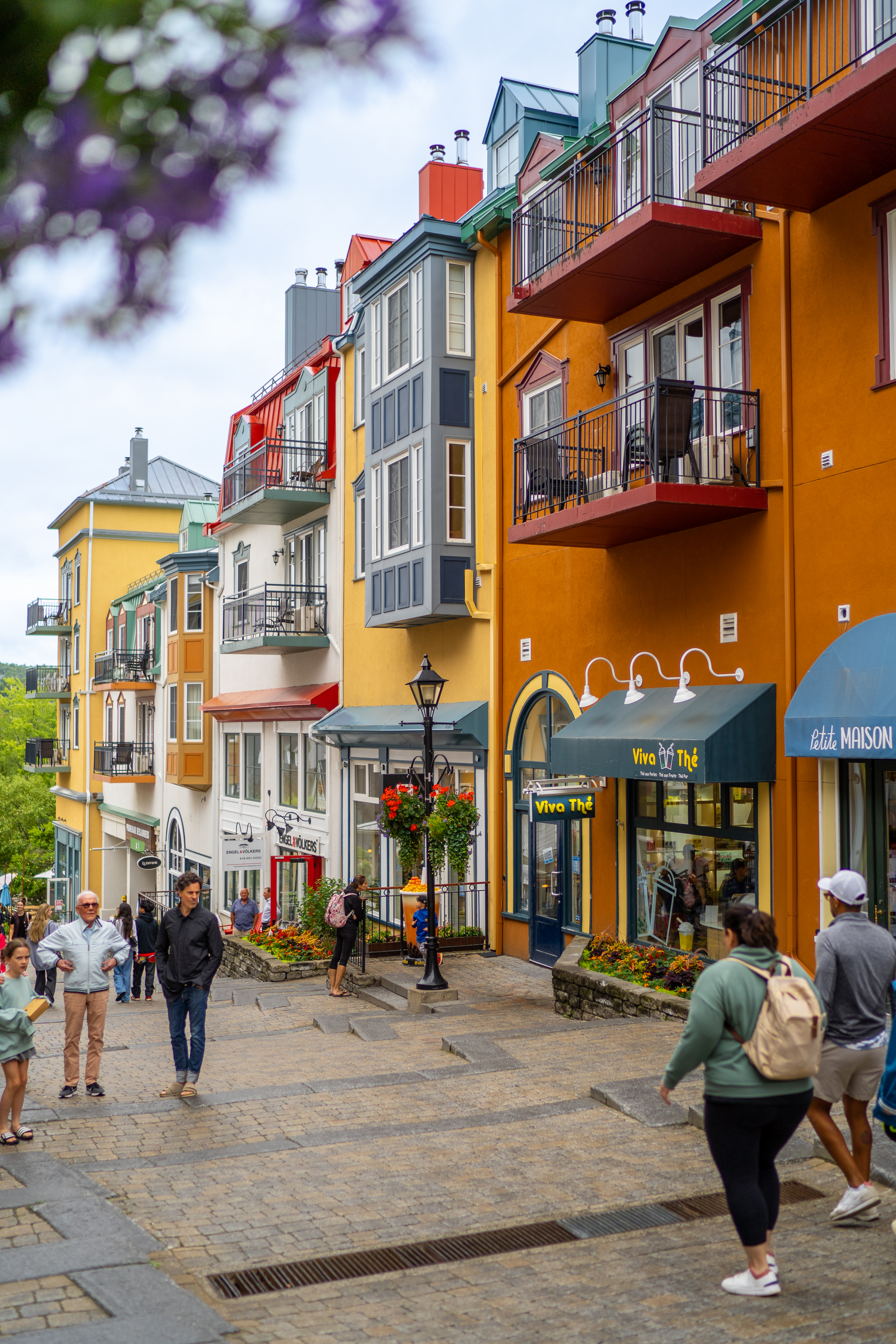

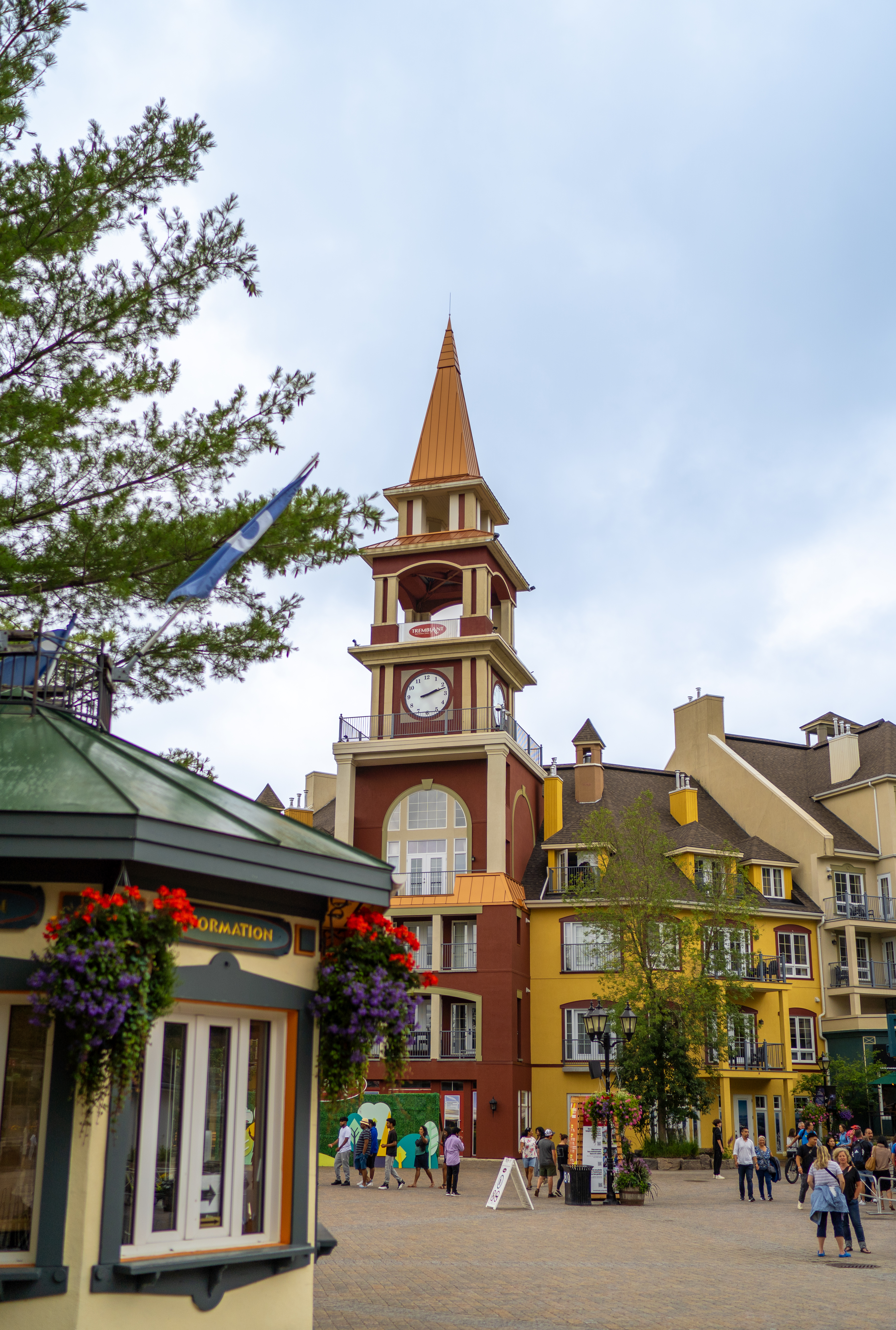
Clock Tower.

The Mont Tremblant Resort also has extensive shopping for ski and snowboard enthusiasts. The municipal village of Mont-Tremblant is 5 km (3.1 mi) distant.

==== Lodging ====
Mont Tremblant has a wide variety of hotel and condo accommodations, many of which are situated in the pedestrian village at the foot of the mountain. There are additional condo and chalet accommodations located adjacent to the pedestrian village which are managed by the resort's rental agency or other private rental agencies. These accommodations feature shuttle bus service which provides guests some of the same convenience afforded to people staying in the pedestrian village.

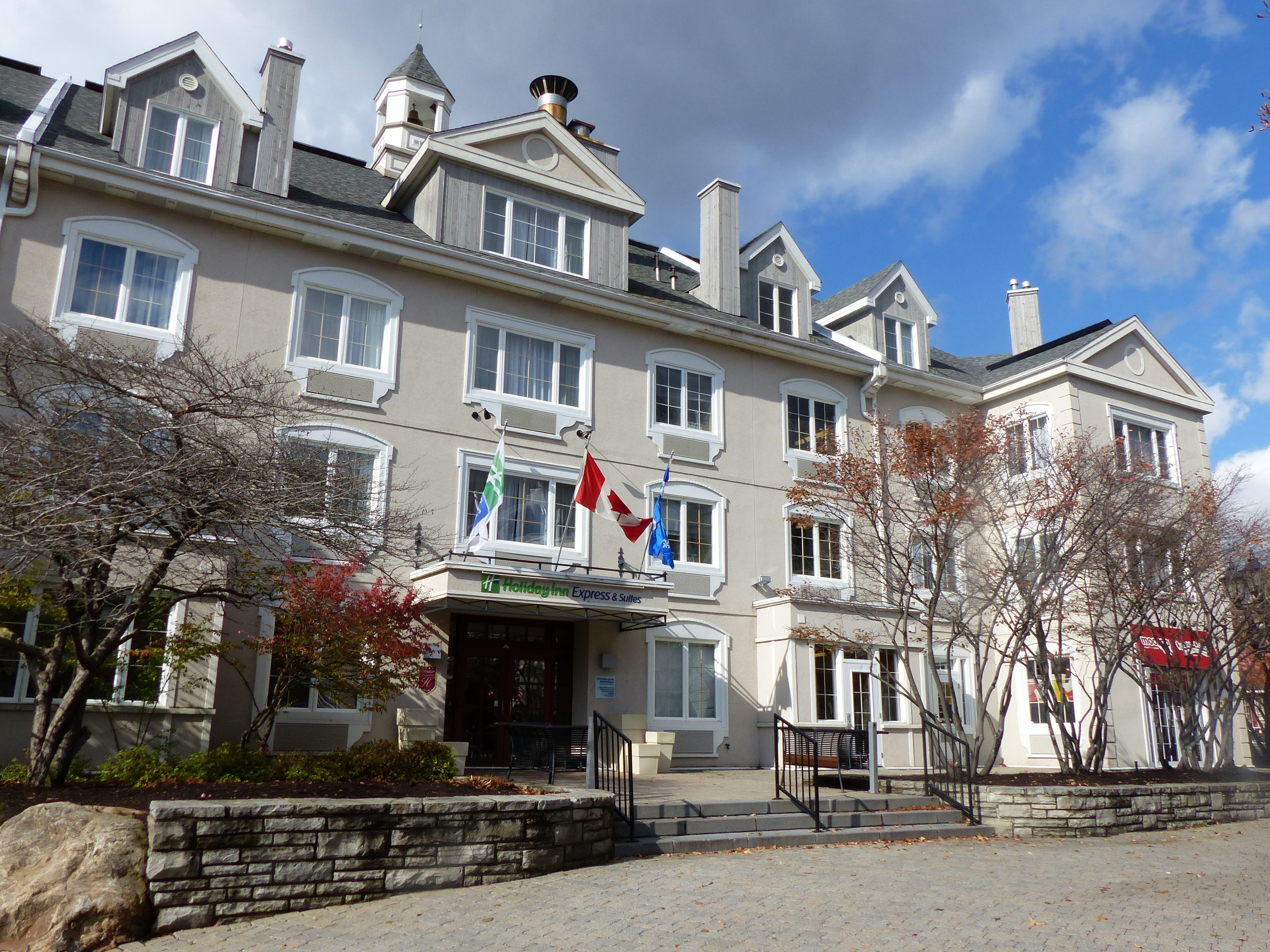
A Holiday Inn Express at the pedestrian village

Most condo accommodations at the resort area are privately owned. The resort or rental agencies act as a rental broker for these properties by handling maintenance, reservations and other guest-related tasks on behalf of owners. There are also many privately owned chalets of all levels (from budget to luxury) in the immediate area.

Club Med announced in late 2025 it would open a second ski-in, ski-out resort in Canada, Club Med Tremblant, set to open for Winter 2028.

=== Sporting areas and facilities ===
Mont Tremblant has year-round activities which take advantage of the surrounding environment (mountains, forest, lakes and rivers); most are set up on daily schedules and usually take the form of tours in small groups and are accessible to families; most are run by independent operators or specialized guides.

Summer activities include, all-terrain vehicle tours, croisieres, boating, canoeing trips, cycling, dune buggy tours, fishing tours, golf, tennis, helicopter tours, hiking, horse back riding, lake cruises, mountain biking, paintball games, rafting, rock climbing school, spas, via ferrata, waterskiing and wakeboarding, white-water rafting, and zip-lines.

Winter activities include cross-country skiing, dogsledding, downhill skiing and ski schools, helicopter tours, ice-climbing, ice fishing, ice skating, paintball, sleigh rides, snowmobiling, snowshoeing, tubing, spas and via ferrata. The resort hosts yearly triathlon Ironman 70.3 events - including the 2014 Ironman 70.3 World Championship - and used to host the Ironman Thriathlon series up until

==== Skiing and snowboarding ====
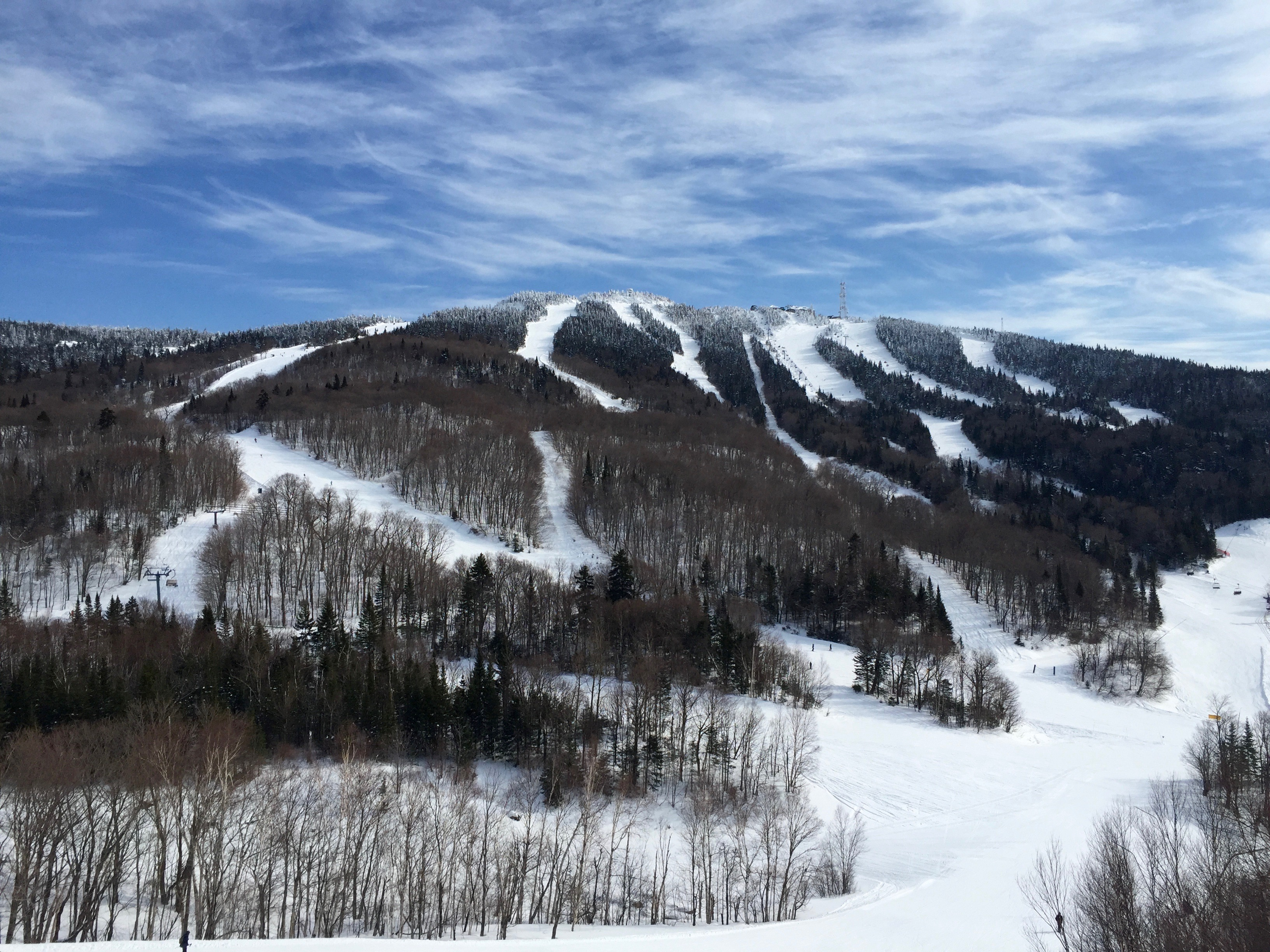
View of the ski and snowboarding runs from the south face

The main resort has more than 700 acres (2.8 km^{2}) of ski and snowboarding trails in four distinct areas: North Side (Versant Nord), South Side (Versant Sud), Sunny Side (Versant Soleil) and The Edge (Versant Edge). Since the 2018-2019 winter season, the resort has 102 ski trails. Of those trails, 22 are labelled easy, 34 intermediate, 42 difficult and 15 expert. There are four snow parks and twenty official glades. In 2026 the mountain will add a beginner (easy) trail to the base of the Soleil side and in 2027 the mountain will add an additional 8 trails from the top of the Timber Summit with 7 of those trails going to the Soleil side and 1 going to the North side.

The resort features 14 lifts, consisting of 3 gondolas (including the open-air gondola in the pedestrian village, the Cabriolet, the Télécabine Casino Express — connecting the South base to the Versant Soleil and Mont-Tremblant's casino —, and the Tremblant Express, a top-to-bottom gondola), 6 detachable quadruple chairlifts, 2 fixed chairlifts, and w magic carpets. An open-air gondola, or cabriolet lift, is used to transport skiers above the village from the parking lot to the bottom of the mountain. The lifts have a total capacity of 27,830 skiers per hour. The resort, since 2025, also has a privately-owned fixed-quad chairlift serving a one-slope housing development on the Soleil side. A fourth surface lift will open on the base of the Soleil side in 2026 serving as a beginner area for that side of the mountain and A seventh high-speed quadruple lift, serving the new Timber Summit, with an hourly rate of 2,400, is set to be constructed for the 2027-2028 ski season.

== Surrounding area ==
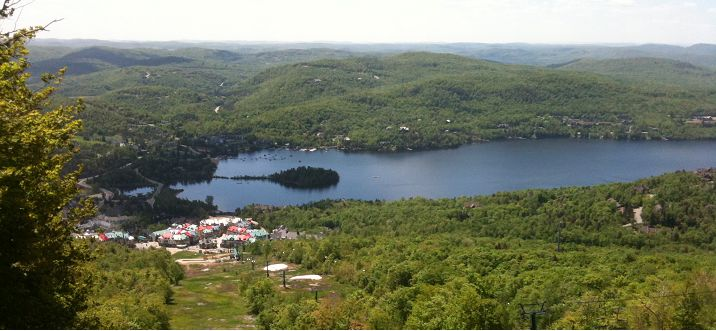
Lake Tremblant, with the resort's pedestrian village visible in the left foreground

The surrounding hills and valleys are filled with trails for cross-country skiing and hiking. The ski trails connect with other ski trails in neighboring towns, making it possible for nature lovers to undertake ski excursions lasting several days going (or coming from) as far south as Blainville, Quebec on the outskirts of Montreal. The network of cross-country ski trails consists of over 100 km of terrain, much of which follows the Devil's river and its adjacent coniferous forest.

The surrounding valleys of the Mont-Tremblant National Park have small lakes, dense boreal forests and thousands of vacation cottages. There are also world-class golf courses, hiking trails and small rivers suitable for canoeing and swimming.

There are some trails for mountain bikes and a special "route verte" rail trail paved for road bicycle use. The cycling/multifunctional path was built on an abandoned right-of-way of the Montreal-Mont Laurier railway; so cyclists do not have to share a path with motorized vehicles.

== See also ==
- Mont-Tremblant public transit
- List of ski areas and resorts in Canada
