= Jacqui Cooper =

Australian freestyle skier

Personal information
- Born: 6 January 1973 (age 53) Melbourne, Australia
- Height: 176 cm (5 ft 9 in)
- Weight: 65 kg (143 lb)
- Website: jacquicooper.com

Sport
- Country: Australia
- Sport: Freestyle skiing
- Event: Aerials
Medal record
Women's freestyle skiing
Representing Australia
FIS Freestyle World Ski Championships
Gold medal – first place	1999 Meiringen-Hasliberg	Aerials
Bronze medal – third place	2007 Madonna di Campiglio	Aerials
Bronze medal – third place	2009 Inawashiro	Aerials

Jacqueline Cooper (born 6 January 1973) is an Australian motivational speaker and retired freestyle skier.

== Skiing career ==
Cooper started skiing aerials at age 16 and was on the Australian team for 20 years. During her career she had many injuries, including a shattered knee, elbow, hip, shoulder and a broken back.

She finished in sixteenth place at the 1994 Winter Olympics and crashed out of the qualification round at the 1998 Winter Olympics. At the Salt Lake Winter Games in 2002, the three-time world champion was a favourite to win gold, but a training accident the week before those games shattered her knee. Teammate Alisa Camplin would win the gold for Australia.

Cooper made her comeback at the 2004 Mount Buller World Aerials, two and a half years after her Salt Lake accident. She won the silver behind fellow Australian Lydia Lassila (née Ierodiaconou). After having a long time off competition, she performed double somersaults, rather than her trademark triples.

At the 2006 Winter Olympics, Cooper entered the final as the favourite, having recorded a world record 213.56 in the qualification round, but she crashed on both jumps.

Cooper won 24 World Cup gold medals, claiming her fifth World Cup title in Inawashiro, Japan.

Cooper was selected for the 2010 Winter Olympics, the first Australian woman to make five Olympic teams, summer or winter. She finished fifth in that competition. Fellow Australian Lydia Lassila took the gold medal.

== Television appearances ==
In 2023, Cooper was a contestant on the Australian reality television show The Summit and was eliminated in the third episode by Brooke Kilowsky.

== Personal life ==
Cooper is the mother of three. Her eldest daughter was diagnosed with coeliac disease when at two years old. Cooper is a volunteer ambassador for Coeliac Victoria and Tasmania.
