= Stéphane Rochon =

Canadian freestyle skier

Personal information
- Born: 15 March 1974 (age 51); Laval, Quebec, Canada

Sport
- Sport: Freestyle skiing

Stéphane Rochon (born 15 March 1974) is a Canadian freestyle skier. He competed at the 1998 Winter Olympics and the 2002 Winter Olympics.
