= Lauri Lassila =

Finnish freestyle skier

Personal information
- Nationality: Finnish
- Born: 12 October 1976 (age 48); Helsinki, Finland

Sport
- Sport: Freestyle skiing

Lauri Lassila (born 12 October 1976) is a Finnish freestyle skier. He competed in the men's moguls event at the 1998 Winter Olympics.

== Personal life ==
Lassila is married to Australian freestyle skier and Olympic gold medalist Lydia Lassila. He works as an IT entrepreneur in Melbourne, Australia.
