= Ann Battelle =

American freestyle skier

Ann Battelle (born January 18, 1968) is a world champion and World Cup champion on the U.S. Ski Team; she competed in the freestyle skiing events of moguls and dual moguls.

== Early years ==
Former U.S. National Champion and World Cup Champion, Olympian, and Olympic Freestyle pioneer Ann Battelle was born in New York, and raised outside Burlington, Vermont. She was brought up skiing, doing competitive gymnastics, and playing soccer in the early years of Title IX. Also a gifted student, Battelle was advanced in mathematics, was fluent in Spanish at a young age, and played the oboe. She was a member of her highly successful varsity soccer team at Champlain Valley Union High School, in Hinesburg, Vermont, as well as a member of the accomplished varsity gymnastics team. Additionally, she skied with friends every weekend possible and on vacations, where her skills with moguls were apparent early on. At Middlebury College, she played varsity soccer and continued to ski a great deal. Recruited by a Ski moguls coach in Colorado, Battelle skied moguls competitively for the first time after she graduated from Middlebury College in 1989, when she was 21 years old. Less than three years later, Battelle competed in her first World Cup on her 24th birthday, on January 18, 1992, in Breckenridge, Colorado, where she placed 16th in Moguls. In the following two World Cups, she placed 5th and 7th (in Lake Placid, New York, on January 24, 2002, and in Oberjoch, Germany on February 1, 2002), which earned her a spot on the US Olympic Team for the 1992 Albertville Olympics.

== United States Ski Team ==
On the World Cup, she had 21 podiums, including five victories, in 108 World Cup starts.

She is a four-time Olympian in Moguls, placing 21st in 1992, 8th in 1994, 10th in 1998, and 7th in 2002 (in 2002 she was 2nd in the qualifying round). She also competed in seven FIS Freestyle World Ski Championships, her best results coming in Meiringen-Hasliberg, Switzerland, in 1999; she was the world champion that year in Moguls and placed 3rd in Dual Moguls.

She won the World Cup tour in Moguls in both 1999 and 2000 and won gold and silver at the Goodwill Games in 2000. She is also a six-time US National Champion.
