= Nicolas Fontaine (skier) =

Canadian freestyle skier

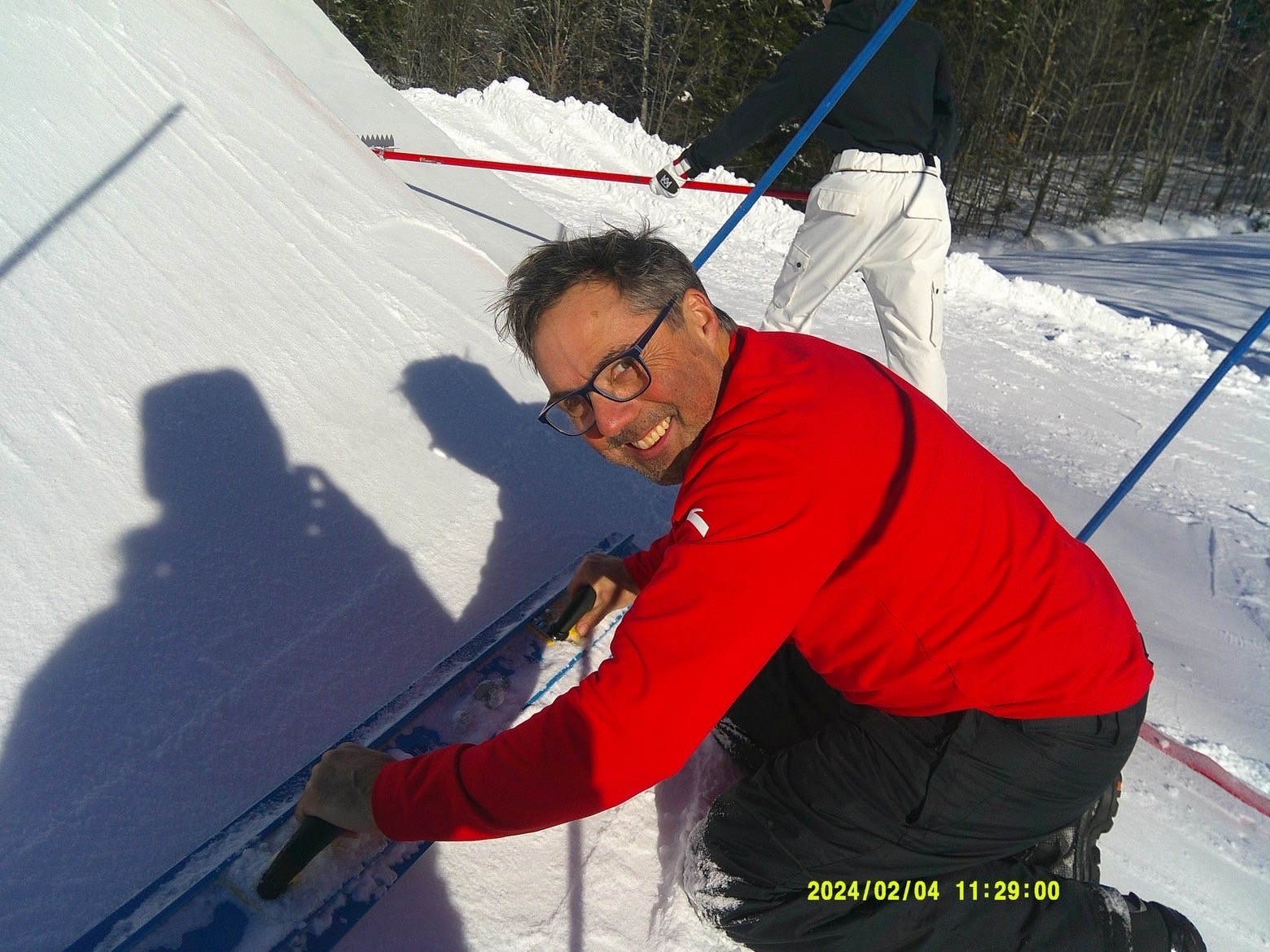

Personal information
- Born: 5 October 1970 (age 55) Magog, Quebec
- Height: 168 cm (5 ft 6 in)

Sport
- Sport: Skiing

Nicolas Fontaine (born 5 October 1970 in Magog, Quebec) is a Canadian freestyle skier. He competed at the 1994 Winter Olympics in Lillehammer, where he placed sixth in aerials. He also competed at the 1998 Winter Olympics in Nagano and at the 2002 Winter Olympics in Salt Lake City.

His son Miha is also a world class Aerials athlete, a member of Canada's bronze medal winning mixed aerials team at the 2022 Beijing Winter Olympics.
