= Johann Grégoire =

French freestyle skier

Personal information
- Nationality: French
- Born: 14 October 1972 (age 52); Bar-le-Duc, France

Sport
- Sport: Freestyle skiing

Johann Grégoire (born 14 October 1972) is a French freestyle skier. He competed in the men's moguls event at the 2002 Winter Olympics.
