= Sami Mustonen =

Finnish freestyle skier

Medal record

Men's freestyle skiing

Representing Finland

Olympic Games
Bronze medal – third place	1998 Nagano	Moguls

FIS Freestyle World Ski Championships
Silver medal – second place	2005 Ruka	Dual Moguls
Bronze medal – third place	1999 Meiringen-Hasliberg	Moguls

Sami Mustonen (born 6 April 1977) is a Finnish freestyle skier and Olympic medallist, who was born in Kemijärvi. He received a bronze medal at the 1998 Winter Olympics in Nagano, in moguls.
