= Missouri's 5th Senate district =

American legislative district

Missouri's 5th State Senate district
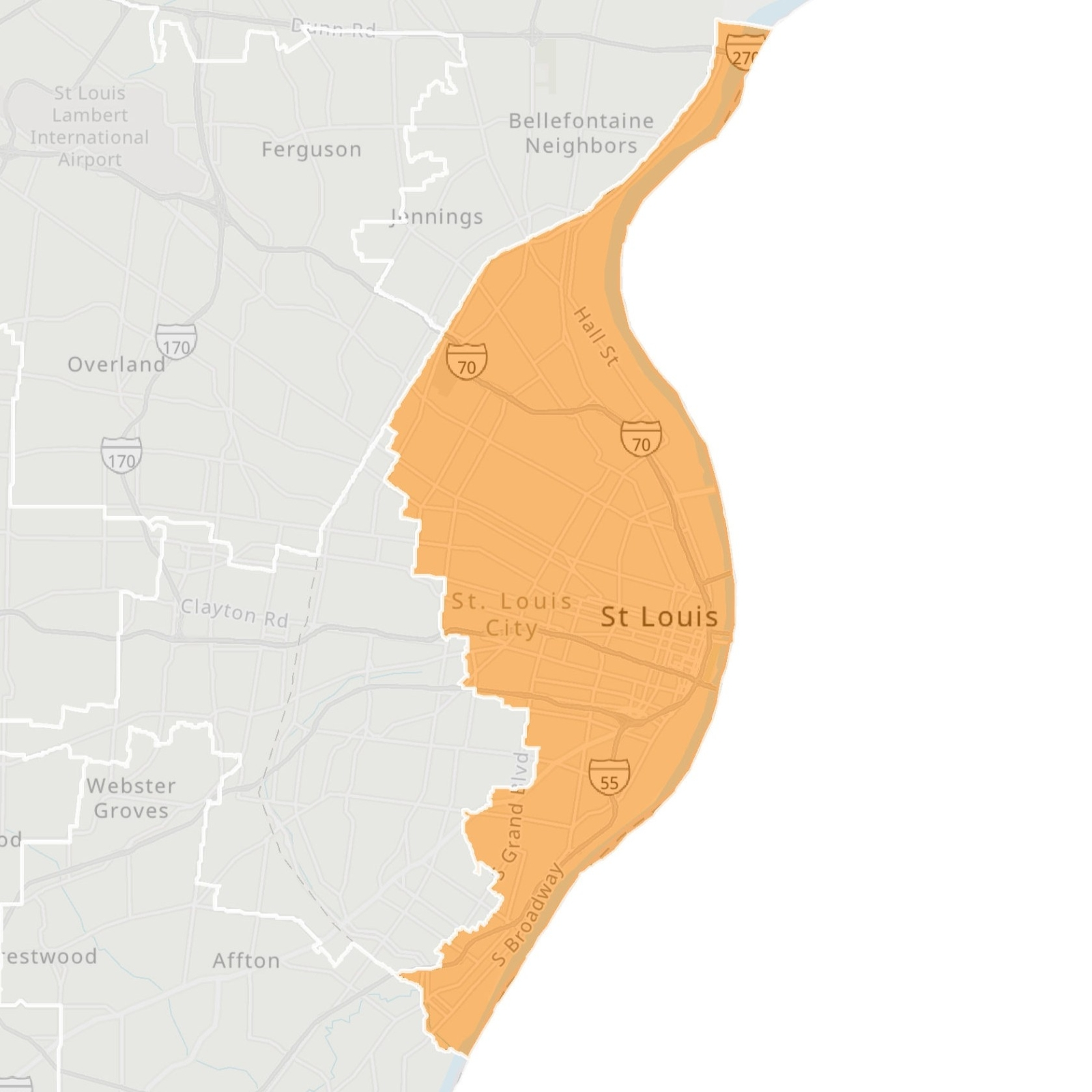
Senator
Steven Roberts; D–St. Louis
- Demographics: 30% White; 58% Black; 5% Hispanic; 3% Asian; 3% Multiracial
- Population (2023): 180,113

Missouri's 5th Senatorial District is one of 34 districts in the Missouri Senate. The district has been represented by Democrat Steven Roberts since 2021.

== Geography ==
The district encompasses about two-thirds of St. Louis city limits, with the excluded portion (stretching from Forest Park down to Princeton Heights) lying within the neighboring 4th district. Even so, the district does include the entire coastline of the Mississippi River along St. Louis. The district is also home to the Gateway Arch, the Old Courthouse of the Dred Scott decision, the St. Louis Cardinals at Busch Stadium, and Saint Louis University.

== Election results (1996–2024) ==
=== 1996 ===
Missouri's 5th Senatorial District election (1996)
Party	Candidate	Votes	%
Democratic	J.B. Banks	31,240	100.00
Total votes		31,240	100.00

=== 2000 ===
Missouri's 5th Senatorial District election (2000)
Party	Candidate	Votes	%
Democratic	Paula J. Carter	32,522	90.80
Republican	Shirley DeMay	3,296	9.20
Total votes		35,818	100.00
Democratic hold			

=== 2002 ===
Missouri's 5th Senatorial District special election (2002)
Party	Candidate	Votes	%
Democratic	Maida Coleman	3,527	80.47
Republican	Roger Plackemeier	856	19.53
Total votes		4,383	100.00
Democratic hold			

=== 2004 ===
Missouri's 5th Senatorial District election (2004)
Party	Candidate	Votes	%
Democratic	Maida Coleman (incumbent)	47,561	91.22
Libertarian	Robb E. Cunningham	4,580	8.78
Total votes		52,141	100.00
Democratic hold			

=== 2008 ===
Missouri's 5th Senatorial District election (2008)
Party	Candidate	Votes	%
Democratic	Robin Wright-Jones	57,796	91.68
Libertarian	Robert Christophel	5,248	8.32
Total votes		63,044	100.00
Democratic hold			

=== 2012 ===
Missouri's 5th Senatorial District election (2012)
Party	Candidate	Votes	%
Democratic	Jamilah Nasheed	64,026	100.00
Total votes		64,026	100.00
Democratic hold			

=== 2016 ===
Missouri's 5th Senatorial District election (2016)
Party	Candidate	Votes	%
Democratic	Jamilah Nasheed (incumbent)	53,339	85.30
Libertarian	Stephen O. Schaper	9,195	14.70
Total votes		62,534	100.00
Democratic hold			

=== 2020 ===
Missouri's 5th Senatorial District election (2020)
Party	Candidate	Votes	%
Democratic	Steven Roberts	56,379	87.10
Republican	Michael Hebron	8,349	12.90
Total votes		64,728	100.00
Democratic hold			

=== 2024 ===
Missouri's 5th Senatorial District election (2024)
Party	Candidate	Votes	%
Democratic	Steven Roberts (incumbent)	47,670	88.57
Republican	Robert Vroman	6,151	11.43
Total votes		53,821	100.00
Democratic hold			

== Statewide election results ==
Year	Office	Results
2008	President	Obama 91.2 – 8.0%
2012	President	Obama 92.0 – 8.0%
2016	President	Clinton 88.1 – 8.5%
2016	Senate	Kander 88.0 – 8.9%
2016	Governor	Koster 87.1 – 9.9%
2018	Senate	McCaskill 90.3 – 7.9%
2020	President	Biden 88.7 – 9.8%
2020	Governor	Galloway 86.4 – 11.3%
