= Missouri's 13th Senate district =

American legislative district

Missouri's 13th State Senate district
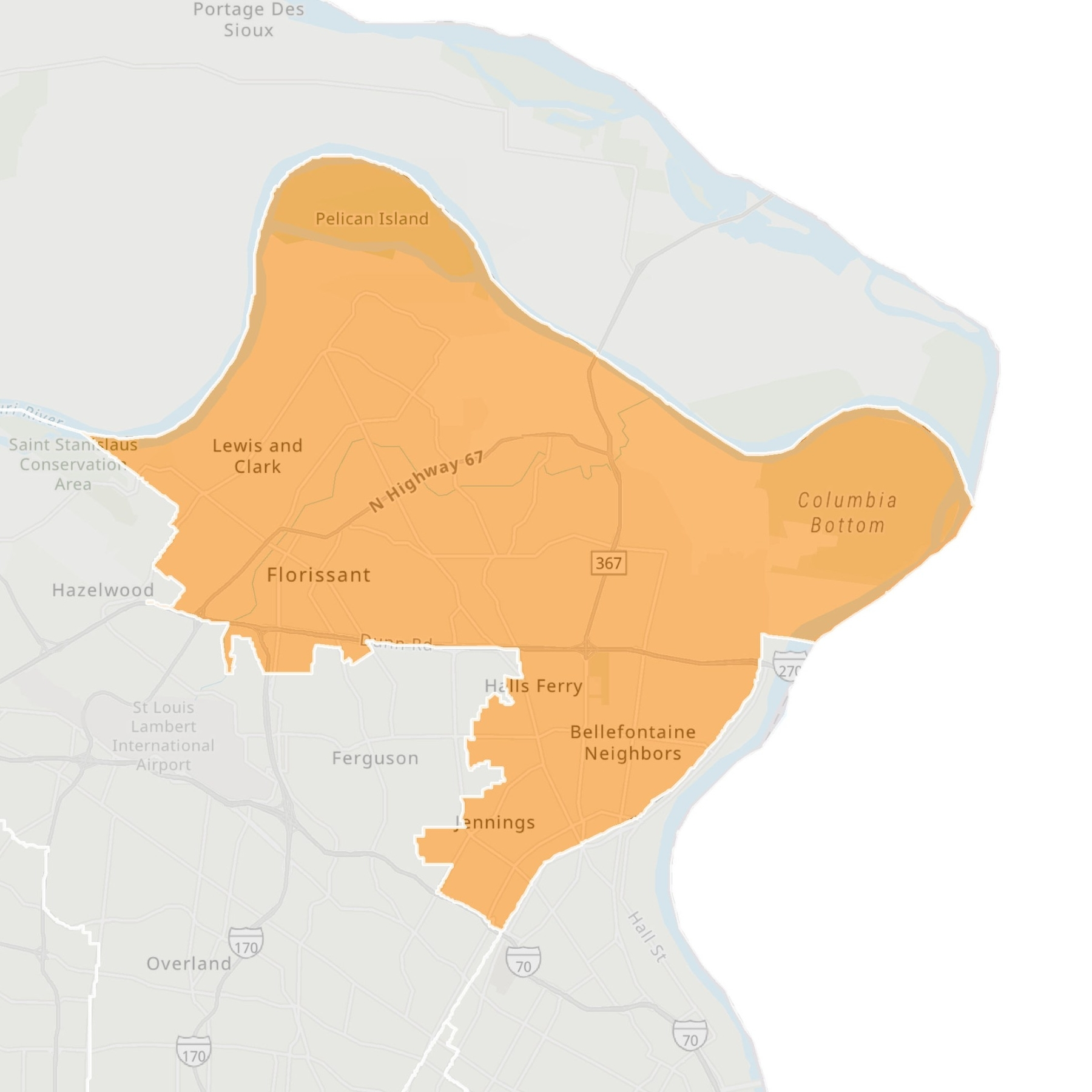
Senator
Angela Mosley; D–Florissant
- Demographics: 25% White; 68% Black; 2% Hispanic; 1% Asian; 1% Other; 5% Multiracial
- Population (2023): 185,403

Missouri's 13th Senatorial District is one of 34 districts in the Missouri Senate. The district has been represented by Democrat Angela Mosley since 2021.

== Geography ==
The district is based in the St. Louis metropolitan area. The district encompasses various cities in northeastern St. Louis County, including Bellefontaine Neighbors, Castlepoint, Florissant, Glasgow Village, Jennings, and Old Jamestown. The district also includes the Old Chain of Rocks Bridge and Columbia Bottom Conservation Area.

== Election results (1996–2024) ==
=== 1996 ===
Missouri's 13th Senatorial District election (1996)
Party	Candidate	Votes	%
Democratic	Wayne Goode	41,678	89.18
Republican	R.W. Baumer	5,055	10.82
Total votes		46,733	100.00
Democratic hold			

=== 2000 ===
Missouri's 13th Senatorial District election (2000)
Party	Candidate	Votes	%
Democratic	Wayne Goode (incumbent)	46,129	100.00
Total votes		46,129	100.00
Democratic hold			

=== 2004 ===
Missouri's 13th Senatorial District election (2004)
Party	Candidate	Votes	%
Democratic	Timothy P. Green	62,808	81.00
Republican	Chester Kath	14,734	19.00
Total votes		77,542	100.00
Democratic hold			

=== 2008 ===
Missouri's 13th Senatorial District election (2008)
Party	Candidate	Votes	%
Democratic	Timothy P. Green (incumbent)	70,933	91.92
Libertarian	Eric S. Harris	6,238	8.08
Total votes		77,172	100.00
Democratic hold			

=== 2012 ===
Missouri's 13th Senatorial District election (2012)
Party	Candidate	Votes	%
Democratic	Gina Walsh	67,715	81.63
Republican	Jacquelyn Thomas	15,243	18.37
Total votes		82,958	100.00
Democratic hold			

=== 2016 ===
Missouri's 13th Senatorial District election (2016)
Party	Candidate	Votes	%
Democratic	Gina Walsh (incumbent)	66,400	100.00
Total votes		66,400	100.00
Democratic hold			

=== 2020 ===
Missouri's 13th Senatorial District election (2020)
Party	Candidate	Votes	%
Democratic	Angela Walton Mosley	64,191	87.56
Libertarian	Jeff Coleman	9,122	12.44
Total votes		73,313	100.00
Democratic hold			

=== 2024 ===
Missouri's 13th Senatorial District election (2024)
Party	Candidate	Votes	%
Democratic	Angela Walton Mosley (incumbent)	63,076	100.00
Total votes		63,076	100.00
Democratic hold			

== Statewide election results ==
Year	Office	Results
2008	President	Obama 78.1 – 21.0%
2012	President	Obama 79.3 – 20.7%
2016	President	Clinton 76.3 – 20.2%
2016	Senate	Kander 79.6 – 17.3%
2016	Governor	Koster 87.7 – 18.4%
2018	Senate	McCaskill 81.7 – 16.2%
2020	President	Biden 80.5 – 18.1%
2020	Governor	Galloway 78.9 – 18.7%
