= Theodore Hoskins =

American politician

Rep. Theodore Hoskins

Member of the Missouri House of Representatives
- In office November 2002 – 2012
- Succeeded by: -
- Constituency: District 80, St. Louis County, Missouri

Mayor of Berkeley, Missouri
- In office April 1996 – 1999
- Preceded by: M. Jean Montgomery
- Constituency: Berkeley, Missouri

Berkeley City Councilman
- In office 1985–1995
- Constituency: 3rd Ward, Berkeley, Missouri

Personal details
- Born: Theodore Hoskins; June 15, 1938 (age 88) St. Louis, Missouri
- Party: Democratic
- Spouse: Lee Etta Hoskins
- Children: 3
- Education: University of Missouri at St. Louis
- Occupation: Politician
- Committees: Student Achievement; Tax Reform; Tourism; Urban Education Reform
- Website: Representative Theodore Hoskins
- Nickname: Ted Hoskins

Military service
- Allegiance: United States
- Branch/service: United States Air Force
- Years of service: 1956-1961
- Rank: Airman 2nd Class
- Discharge: Received an Honorable discharge

Theodore Hoskins (born June 15, 1938), also referred to as Ted Hoskins, is an American politician with the Democratic Party. He was a member of the Missouri House of Representatives and has been mayor of Berkeley, Missouri since his election in 2012. Hoskins was born in St. Louis, Missouri, and raised in Berkeley, Missouri. He served in the United States Air Force from 1956 to 1961, and left with an honorable discharge. He received education in business administration at Florissant Valley Community College, where he obtained an associate's degree, and at the University of Missouri-St. Louis. He is married with three children, and resides in Berkeley, Missouri. Hoskins has worked in a financial capacity with Bi-State Development Agency, and is owner and CEO of T & L Automated Accounting Services.

Hoskins was elected a Berkeley City Councilman in 1985, representing the 3rd Ward of Berkeley, Missouri. He was reelected to the Berkeley City Council in 1986, 1990 and 1994. While city councilman, Hoskins also served as president of the Black Elected County Officials of St. Louis County, Missouri, and supported the redistricting of election districts in Missouri at both state and local levels to emphasize representation of African-Americans. In 1992, he ran against Wayne Goode of Pasadena Hills, Missouri for a seat in the Missouri State Senate, representing the 13th district. Hoskins' platform included increasing representation of African-Americans through redistricting, improvements to education, and a state health insurance plan, but he lost the election to Goode.

In 1995, Hoskins was a candidate for Mayor of Berkeley, Missouri, but lost to incumbent Acting-Mayor Jean Montgomery. He was again a candidate for mayor in 1996, and defeated incumbent Berkeley Mayor Jean Montgomery in the April 2, 1996 election. While mayor, Hoskins often sided with three city council members to create a voting majority of 4–3, with an agenda of encouraging growth and development in the municipality. He was challenged politically in his position as mayor, and opposing members of the city council attempted to oust him in 1996. In August 1997, the Berkeley City Council passed an amendment to the City Charter allowing Hoskins to hold the position of Democratic committeeman for Norwood Township while still serving as Mayor of Berkeley. Berkeley City Councilman Kenneth W. McClendon had filed a lawsuit in St. Louis County Court in July 1997 seeking to remove Hoskins from his position as mayor because of his concurrent role as Committeeman. A group of individuals critical of Hoskins sought to remove him as mayor, and in June 1998 a judge's order removed him from office, citing his concurrent role as a Democratic committeeman as a violation of the city's charter. In August 1998, voters recalled Hoskins as mayor, but the following October the Missouri Court of Appeals reversed the order removing him from office, and he returned to the position as mayor.

Hoskins was elected to the Missouri House of Representatives in November 2002, representing District 80, and has served in the 92nd, 93rd, and 94th General Assembly of the Missouri General Assembly. In 2005, he voiced his support for set-asides for minority and women-owned businesses to Governor of Missouri Matt Blunt. In 2006, Hoskins wrote a letter in his capacity as Chairman of the Missouri Legislative Black Caucus to the St. Louis NAACP, criticizing the organization for supporting former KTRS radio host David Lenihan. Lenihan was fired after he had used a racial slur on the air in reference to then-United States Secretary of State Condoleezza Rice. Hoskins wrote that the action of the local NAACP chapter of giving Lenihan life member status "cheapened the value of our rich history". In 2008, Hoskins sponsored a bill which would change the requirements in Missouri to only mandate a license plate on the rear bumper of a vehicle. He stated the bill "would save a significant amount of money for the state." On January 14, 2009, House Speaker Ron Richard announced the leadership of the 50 committees in the Missouri House of Representatives, including Hoskins as Chairman of the Urban Affairs Committee. Hoskins is the only Democratic chairman of a committee in the Missouri House of Representatives. In 2009 Hoskins served on four special committees: Student Achievement, Tax Reform, Tourism, and Urban Education Reform.

== Personal life and family ==
Hoskins was born on June 15, 1938, in St. Louis, Missouri, and raised in Berkeley, Missouri. He served in the United States Air Force from 1956 to 1961. He received an honorable discharge, with the rank of Airman 2nd Class. Hoskins graduated from Florissant Valley Community College, receiving an associate's degree in business administration in 1973. He graduated from the University of Missouri at St. Louis in 1992, where he received a bachelor's degree in business administration. He is married and has three children. His wife is Lee Etta Hoskins, and their children are Rita, Pamela, and Kelley. In 1997, Hoskins' wife presented an educational booth on cancer prevention, at the Missouri Black Expo event at America's Center.

While in his first term as a Berkeley City Councilman, Hoskins worked as an accountant and internal auditor for Bi-State Development Agency, and as president of T & L Automated Accounting Services. In 2000 he was manager of special financial projects for Bi-State Development Agency. In 2009 he was owner and chief executive officer of T & L Automated Accounting Services.

== Political career ==
=== Berkeley City Council ===
Hoskins is a Democrat and resident of Berkeley, Missouri. Hoskins was elected a Berkeley City Councilman in 1985, representing the 3rd Ward of Berkeley, Missouri. He was reelected to the Berkeley City Council in 1986, 1990 and 1994. In his 1990 campaign for a second term as Berkeley City Councilman, Hoskins was a proponent of a city hall and community center for Berkeley. He won reelection to a second term as a City Councilman in April 1990 with 256 votes; his opponent, a write-in candidate, garnered 59 votes.

In 1990, Hoskins was the sole Berkeley City Council member to join with Berkeley Mayor Bill Miller in opposing the hiring of a former city manager of Edgewater, Florida and Cocoa, Florida as city manager of Berkeley. Hoskins and the Mayor both stated they had concerns about the city manager's skills and background. Hoskins also voiced concerns that the individual had cost the city of Cocoa, Florida over US$200,000 in legal fees for firing the city's chief of police. Other council members supported the hiring of the city manager. In August 1990, Hoskins opposed a resolution which called for a buyout of southeast Berkeley by St. Louis County due to airport noise.

In 1991, Hoskins served as president of the Black Elected County Officials of St. Louis County, Missouri. Hoskins announced the organization endorsed Lt. Gov. Mel Carnahan in his campaign for Governor of Missouri. Hoskins joined with Missouri Rep. Charles Q. Troupe of St. Louis and the African American Voting Rights Legal Defense Fund in a 1991 lawsuit against Governor John Ashcroft, Secretary of State Roy Blunt and St. Louis County, St. Louis, and Kansas City, Missouri election officials, which asserted that a Missouri House redistricting plan was unfavorable towards African-Americans.

Hoskins supported a 1991 attempt by Charlene Jones of the Missouri House Redistricting Commission to increase the number of House districts with a black majority from 13 to 17. At an August 1991 hearing of the redistricting commission in St. Louis County, Hoskins requested the commission establish a district that contained at least a 65 percent minority representation. In October 1991, Hoskins requested that the Missouri Appellate Senate Apportionment Commission adhere to the Voting Rights Act, by forming black districts. Hoskins informed the Missouri State Senate that the 13th Senatorial District in north St. Louis County the district, then only 56 percent black, must be redistricted to 66 percent black in order to beat the white incumbent politician. Hoskins was a witness for the plaintiffs challenging the Missouri House redistricting plan in 1992, acknowledged black representatives had been elected from white-majority districts and white representatives from black-majority districts, but he went on to state "I know if blacks had their choice, they wouldn't vote for them." When asked by Missouri Assistant Attorney General Michael Boicourt who had chosen Hoskins to represent black voters in the debate, Hoskins replied: "Because I'm black, I designated myself today to speak for blacks."

In January 1992, Hoskins told the United States Department of Energy to get rid of radioactive waste which was contaminating multiple locations in St. Louis. "I'm not concerned about where you take it, and I'm not even going to give you a suggestion. I just want you to take it," said Hoskins. In May 1992, Hoskins cast the sole dissenting vote when the Berkeley City Council voted to accept the resignation of then-City Manager William Thomas Powers. Powers had said in his letter to the council that he wished to resign due to both professional and personal reasons.

In 1992, Hoskins campaigned against incumbent Wayne Goode of Pasadena Hills, Missouri for a seat in the Missouri State Senate, representing the 13th district. Hoskins stated he would make education a priority on his agenda if elected. He was supported by the St. Louis County Black Elected Officials group, and was a proponent of increasing representation of African-Americans through a redistricting process. "We need to elect African-Americans because they are sensitive to African-American concerns. We need to take a position, right or wrong, to support these people. We need to go all out to elect them and expect benefit to the community. We should not sit on the sidelines and after the election is over have to go begging," said Hoskins. Hoskins asserted that "The biggest issue ... is that the incumbent has lost touch with the residents of the community." Hoskins proposed improvements to education as a priority if elected, as well as a state health insurance plan. Goode won the election by 58 percent.

In October 1993, Hoskins stated his position on a proposed expansion of the county council would be influenced by how this would impact black people, based on the intended changes to boundary lines. In April 1994, in his capacity as president of the Black Elected County Officials of St. Louis County, Hoskins announced the organization would support state representative William L. Clay's campaign for reelection to the 1st district in Missouri, for a 14th term as representative. In November 1994, Hoskins was encouraged by the election of Charlie Dooley as St. Louis County government's first black elected official, and commented "It brings everybody's viewpoints to the table."

=== Mayor of Berkeley, Missouri ===
In 1995, Hoskins was a candidate for Mayor of Berkeley, Missouri. He campaigned on issues of diversity and improving the economy of the city. He received 515 votes, but lost to incumbent Acting-Mayor Jean Montgomery, who received 582 votes. Hoskins was again a candidate for Mayor of Berkeley in 1996, and campaigned on issues of building a recreational facility in the city, improving police protection, and stabilizing the housing situation in the city. Hoskins defeated incumbent Berkeley Mayor Jean Montgomery in the April 2, 1996 election. Hoskins received 816 votes, to Montgomery's 725.

"Mayor Theodore "Ted" Hoskins joins three council members to make the majority ... They operate the government on an agenda of attracting development and growth to the municipality of 12,240 residents."

— St. Louis Post-Dispatch

On June 10, 1996, Berkeley City Council members Kenneth McClendon, Nina Schaeffer, and Babatund Dienbo held a closed meeting where they asserted that Hoskins should resign from his position as mayor – they felt he had interfered in the city's daily operations. Hoskins stated he had ruled that the heads of Berkeley city departments should report to him as at the time there was not an acting city manager. Berkeley City Attorney Denise Watson-Wesley characterized the actions of McClendon, Schaeffer, and Dienbo as improper, and said "As of this day, Mayor Ted Hoskins is still mayor." In August 1997, the St. Louis Post-Dispatch reported that Hoskins generally joined with Judy Ferguson Shaw, Louvenia Mathison and Marian Robinson to create a 4-3 voting majority against council members McClendon, Schaeffer, and Dienbo. The newspaper reported that the majority of four politicians including Mayor Hoskins "operate the government on an agenda of attracting development and growth to the municipality of 12,240 residents."

In August 1997, the Berkeley City Council passed an amendment to the City Charter allowing Hoskins to hold the position of Democratic committeeman for Norwood Township while still serving as Mayor of Berkeley. Berkeley City Councilman Kenneth W. McClendon had filed a lawsuit in St. Louis County Court in July 1997 seeking to remove Hoskins from his position as mayor because of his concurrent role as Committeeman. In 1998, Jan Kreutz, leader of a group critical of Hoskins, sought to remove him from his position as mayor. Kreutz twice gathered signatures in petitions to have an election which would remove Hoskins from office, but both times the Berkeley city clerk refused to certify the petitions. Kreutz's organization of citizens sued, and in March 1998 a circuit court ordered a recall election. Hoskins faced a court-ordered recall election, and he sought to appeal the election process. On March 17, 1998, a judge of the Missouri Court of Appeals denied a motion to expedite Hoskins' appeal of the court order mandating a recall election. On March 20, 1998, Missouri Court of Appeals Judge Kathianne Knaup Crane stopped the recall election, planned for April 7, and instead ruled that the lower court judge must postpone the election to a later date. Elbert Walton, who represented Hoskins in the matter, told the St. Louis Post-Dispatch that an April 7 election date would have violated state law, which specifies a minimum period of six weeks between a court order and the subsequent election.

On April 7, 1998, Mayor Hoskins swore in George H. Hopper as a city council member though he had garnered fewer votes in the election than his opponent, incumbent Kenneth McClendon. Write-in candidate McClendon was removed from the ballot due to being late with a garbage bill. However, a county judge swore in McClendon to the city council the day after Hoskins ordered Hopper to the position, because McClendon had received more votes and this result had been certified by the County Election Board. St. Louis County Prosecutor Robert P. McCulloch sued to remove Hopper from his position as councilman, writing in court papers that Hopper "did not receive the highest number of votes cast. He is, therefore, not entitled to hold office". City attorney Elbert Walton said that the lawsuit by McCulloch "isn't worth the paper it's written on". Legislators including state senators William Lacy Clay, Jr. and J.B. Banks wrote a letter to McCulloch in support of the action by Hoskins. A subsequent City Council meeting in May 1998 became unruly when individuals began to protest Hoskins' decision to recognize Hopper, then the councilman-at-large. During the meeting, Mayor Hoskins ordered police to remove individuals, including a city councilman. He also ordered police to remove Jan Kreutz, who had brought political literature with her to the meeting.

Hoskins was removed from office as Mayor of Berkeley, Missouri by a judge's order, and a state appeals court ruling in June 1998 declined to block this decision. Associate Circuit Judge Patrick Clifford ordered that Hoskins be removed from office effective June 24, 1998, after ruling he had violated the city's charter by holding both the elected offices of Democratic committeeman from Norwood Township and Mayor of Berkeley, Missouri, at the same time. Chief judge of the appeals court, Lawrence G. Crahan, subsequently refused to delay the Hoskins' removal from office. Councilman-at-large George Hopper then became acting mayor. "I'm going to step up and do whatever has to be done. I will look out for the welfare of the city," Hopper stated.

On August 4, 1998, voters recalled Hoskins as mayor by a 2-1 ratio. Hoskins maintained that a group of individuals who supported the prior mayor could not accept his assuming the office, and were motivated by an attempt to gain power over local government politics. On October 6, 1998, the Missouri Court of Appeals reversed the June 1998 order by St. Louis County Associate Circuit Judge Patrick Clifford that removed Hoskins from power as mayor. "As of today, we have our mayor back," said Hoskins' attorney, Elbert Walton. The Missouri Court of Appeals ruling stated they "need not and do not decide in this case what consequences flow from the recall election conducted subsequent to the mayor's ouster". The court determined that Hoskins' position as committeeman of Norwood Township was not characterized as an elected position under the Berkeley, Missouri charter, stating "the duty of a political party committeeman is solely to represent the interests of his party, not the public at large".

Hoskins was a candidate for Mayor of Berkeley, Missouri in the April 4, 2000 election. His opponents on the ballot included Kenneth W. McClendon, Gwendolyn M. Verges, Babatunde Deindo, and M. Jean Montgomery. Hoskins was also a candidate in the April 2000 election for committeeman for Norwood Township.

=== Missouri House of Representatives ===
In August 2002, Hoskins was a candidate for the Missouri House of Representatives, District 80, and won with 42% of the votes. He was elected to the Missouri House of Representatives in November 2002, and has served in the 92nd, 93rd, and 94th General Assembly of the Missouri General Assembly.

In 2005 as a member of the Missouri Legislative Black Caucus, Hoskins joined with the caucus to request Governor Matt Blunt cease awarding state contracts until after a federal court comes to a resolution in a case involving set-asides for minority and women-owned businesses. Hoskins urged the Missouri attorney general's office to obtain expert legal advice in order to defend the set asides. In a meeting at Harris-Stowe State College, Hoskins, state representative Amber Boykins, and business owners asked that those in attendance help work to put back the requirements of "20 percent minority and 10 percent for women-owned business participation in contracts".

In April 2006, Hoskins wrote a letter in his capacity as Chairman of the Missouri Legislative Black Caucus to the St. Louis NAACP, criticizing the organization for supporting former KTRS radio host David Lenihan. In May 2006, Lenihan was on the air and used a racial slur when discussing then-United States Secretary of State Condoleezza Rice. Lenihan was fired from his job at KTRS 20 minutes later, and in his letter Hoskins wrote that a reprimand should be given by the NAACP chapter president Harold Crumpton and regional director Gill Ford for their support of Lenihan. "To have seen, heard and read how Mr. Crumpton and those who supported him (mainly Rev. Gill Ford) handshaking, backslappin,' huggin', and grinnin' with an individual who has (we hope) mistakenly disrespected our race is unconscionable," wrote Hoskins. Hoskins also wrote that the action of the local NAACP chapter of giving Lenihan life member status "cheapened the value of our rich history". Hoskins co-sponsored a bill by state representative Carl Bearden in 2006 that proposed to start a tax-credit program aimed at students who desired to leave three school districts with poor academic performance.

In 2008, Hoskins sponsored a bill which would change the requirements in Missouri to only mandate a license plate on the rear bumper of a vehicle. A similar bill was proposed in 2007, but this bill did not pass. Missouri has required a license plate on both the front and rear bumpers of vehicles since 1907. "It would save a significant amount of money for the state," said Hoskins of the bill. On the bill's prospects of passing, Hoskins stated "I'm always hopeful. Taking our financial condition as a state, we should be looking at any aspect of revenue savings. This would give them one."

On January 14, 2009, House Speaker Ron Richard announced the leadership of the 50 committees in the Missouri House of Representatives, including Hoskins as Chairman of the Urban Affairs Committee. Hoskins is the only Democratic chairman of a committee in the Missouri House of Representatives. In 2009 Hoskins served on four special committees: Student Achievement, Tax Reform, Tourism, and Urban Education Reform.

== See also ==
- Missouri House of Representatives
- Missouri General Assembly

Political offices
Preceded by	Member of the Missouri House of Representatives, District 80; November 2002 – incumbent	Succeeded by Incumbent
Preceded by M. Jean Montgomery	Mayor of Berkeley, Missouri; April 1996–1999	Succeeded by
Preceded by	Berkeley City Councilman, 3rd Ward; 1985–1995	Succeeded by
