= Neil Molloy =

American politician

Member of the Missouri House of Representatives from the 71st district
- In office January 6, 1993 – June 1993
- Preceded by: Timothy P. Green
- Succeeded by: Rita Heard Days

Member of the Missouri House of Representatives from the 81st district
- In office January 9, 1985 – January 6, 1993
- Preceded by: P. Wayne Goode
- Succeeded by: James Foley

Personal details
- Born: April 22, 1948 St. Louis, Missouri
- Died: December 31, 2007 (aged 59) St. Louis, Missouri
- Party: Democratic

Neil Molloy (April 22, 1948 – December 31, 2007) was an American politician who served in the Missouri House of Representatives from 1985 to 1993.

He died on December 31, 2007, in St. Louis, Missouri at age 59.
