= Matt Chojnacki =

American freestyle skier

Matt Chojnacki (born 28 December 1973) is a freestyle skiing aerialist on the United States Ski Team from 1995 to 2001 and competed in 1998 Winter Olympics. During that period he had six podium finishes, including one win, on the FIS Freestyle Skiing World Cup, and was the 1998 United States National Champion in Aerials.

== World Records ==
In 1999, at Steamboat Springs, Colorado, Chojnacki became the first person to land a quadruple somersault (four back flips with two twists) on snow with a clean (no touch) landing. That same season, along with Eric Bergoust and Nicolas Fontaine, Chojnacki tied the World Record for aerial skiing by completing a triple twisting quadruple somersault, a 17-year-old record set by Frank Bare, Jr. in 1983. Then on April 4, 2001, at Winter Park resort, Colorado, Chojnacki broke that mark by adding a full twist to the quad for a Half-Rudy (one and one-half)-Full-Full, or a quadruple back somersault with four twists and the current Guinness World Record. Chojnacki was partially trained and coached by Frank Bare, Jr. for that jump. In addition, he set the aerials water ramps world record in 2000, at the Utah Olympic Park, by completing a quintuple twisting quadruple back somersault with a Half-Rudy (one and one-half)-DoubleFull-Full.
