= Gina Walsh =

American politician

Minority Leader of the Missouri Senate
- In office July 7, 2016 – January 6, 2021; Acting: July 7, 2016 – January 9, 2017
- Preceded by: Joe Keaveny
- Succeeded by: John Rizzo

Member of the Missouri Senate from the 13th district
- In office January 2013 – January 6, 2021
- Preceded by: Tim Green
- Succeeded by: Angela Mosley

Member of the Missouri House of Representatives from the 69th district
- In office January 2003 – January 2011
- Preceded by: Juanita Head Walton
- Succeeded by: Tommie Pierson

Personal details
- Born: April 23, 1957 (age 69) St. Louis, Missouri, U.S.
- Party: Democratic

Regina M. "Gina" Walsh (born April 23, 1957) is a Democratic Party member of the Missouri Senate, representing District 13 from 2013 to 2021. She served as interim Senate Minority Leader. Prior to her service in the State Senate, Walsh served four terms in the Missouri House of Representatives, representing North St. Louis County's 69th District, which included Bellefontaine Neighbors, Glasgow Village, Jennings, Moline Acres, and Riverview.

== Electoral history ==
=== State representative ===
Missouri House of Representatives Primary Election, August 6, 2002, District 69
Party	Candidate	Votes	%	±%
Democratic	Gina Walsh	1,384	54.86%	
Democratic	Marlene Y. Terry	801	31.75%	
Democratic	Wanda L. Moose	338	13.40%	

Missouri House of Representatives Election, November 5, 2002, District 69
Party	Candidate	Votes	%	±%
Democratic	Gina Walsh	7,326	94.06%	−5.96
Independent	Arnie C. Dienoff	463	5.94%	+5.94

Missouri House of Representatives Primary Election, August 3, 2004, District 69
Party	Candidate	Votes	%	±%
Democratic	Gina Walsh	2,700	57.50%	+2.64
Democratic	Marlene Terry	1,696	42.50%	+10.75

Missouri House of Representatives Election, November 2, 2004, District 69
Party	Candidate	Votes	%	±%
Democratic	Gina Walsh	12,511	96.51%	+2.45
Independent	Arnie C. Dienoff	453	3.49%	−2.45

Missouri House of Representatives Election, November 7, 2006, District 69
Party	Candidate	Votes	%	±%
Democratic	Gina Walsh	7,455	94.73%	−1.78
Independent	Arnie C. Dienoff	415	5.27%	+1.78

Missouri House of Representatives Primary Election, August 5, 2008, District 69
Party	Candidate	Votes	%	±%
Democratic	Gina Walsh	1,228	70.21%	
Democratic	Terry Wilson	521	29.79%	

Missouri House of Representatives Election, November 4, 2008, District 69
Party	Candidate	Votes	%	±%
Democratic	Gina Walsh	12,950	92.07%	−2.66
Independent	Kellen Markovich	789	5.61%	+0.34
Libertarian	Julie Stone	327	2.32%	+2.32

=== State Senate ===
Missouri Senate Election, August 7, 2012, District 13
Party	Candidate	Votes	%	±%
Democratic	Gina Walsh	13,790	63.55%	
Democratic	Redditt Hudson	7,908	36.45%	

Missouri Senate Election, November 6, 2012, District 13
Party	Candidate	Votes	%	±%
Democratic	Gina Walsh	67,715	81.63%	−10.29
Republican	Jacquelyn Thomas	15,243	18.37%	+18.37

Missouri Senate Election, November 8, 2016, District 13
Party	Candidate	Votes	%	±%
Democratic	Gina Walsh	66,400	100.00%	+18.37

Missouri Senate
Preceded by Joe Keaveny	Minority Leader of the Missouri Senate; 2016–2021; Acting: 2016–2017	Succeeded by John Rizzo
