= Frank Bare =

Frank Bare may refer to:

- Frank Bare Sr. (1930–2011), American gymnast and co-founder of USA Gymnastics
- Frank Bare Jr., American freestyle skier of the 1970s and 1980s
