= Missouri Legislative Black Caucus =

The Missouri Legislative Black Caucus, Inc. (MLBC) is an organization representing African American members of the Missouri Senate and Missouri House of Representatives. African American members of Missouri's 75th General Assembly (1969-1970) formally established the Missouri Legislative Black Caucus. The current Chair is Representative Kem Smith and the Executive Director is Cheryl Dozier.

== Current members ==
- Senator Steve Roberts
- Senator Barbara Anne Washington
- Senator Angela Walton Mosley
- Representative Kem Smith Chairman
- Representative Tiffany Price, Vice-Chairman
- Representative Del Taylor , Treasurer
- Representative Donna Barnes Secretary
- Representative Marlon Anderson
- Representative Yolanda Young
- Representative Yolonda Fountain Henderson
- Representative Jewel Kelly
- Representative Ray Reed
- Representative David Tyson Smith
- Representative Tonya Rush
- Representative Tony Van Trece
- Representative Chanel Mosley
- Representative Stephanie Boykin
- Representative Donna Barnes
- Representative Nicole Greer
- Representative Marla Smith
- Representative Melissa Douglas
- Representative Anthony Ealy
- Representative Marlene Terry
- Representative Kennedy Moore
