= Angela Mosley =

American politician

Angela Walton Mosley

Member of the Missouri Senate from the 13th district
- Incumbent
- Assumed office January 6, 2021
- Preceded by: Gina Walsh

Personal details
- Party: Democratic
- Spouse: Jay Mosley
- Relations: Rochelle Walton Gray (sister); Alan Gray (brother-in-law)
- Children: Chanel Mosley
- Parent(s): Elbert Walton (father); Juanita Head Walton (step-mother)
- Profession: Doctor

Angela Walton Mosley is an American politician currently serving in the Missouri Senate from the 13th district. She won her election in the 2020 Missouri Senate election, and she succeeded fellow Democrat Gina Walsh.

Walton Mosley's husband Jay is a member of the Missouri House of Representatives from the 68th district. Her daughter Chanel Mosley is the member for the 75th district.

In 2025, Mosley sponsored bipartisan legislation to institute independent oversight of Missouri prisons, named "Larry's Law" in memory of Larry Miller, who died following an attack at Crossroads Correctional Center in 2014.

== Electoral history ==
=== State Senate ===
Missouri Senate District 13 Primary Election, 2020
Party	Candidate	Votes	%
Democratic	Angela Mosley	13,580	41.21%
Democratic	Tommie Pierson Jr.	13,219	40.11%
Democratic	Alan (Al) Green	6,156	18.68%
Total votes		32,955	100.00%

Missouri Senate District 13 Election, 2020
Party	Candidate	Votes	%
Democratic	Angela Mosley	64,191	87.56%
Libertarian	Jeff Coleman	9,122	12.44%
Total votes		73,313	100.00%
