= Frank Bare Sr. =

American gymnast

- Full name: Frank Lee Bare Sr.
- Born: September 13, 1930 Kennett, Missouri, U.S.
- Died: February 25, 2011 (aged 80) La Jolla, California, U.S.
- Relatives: Frank Bare Jr. (son)

Gymnastics career
- Discipline: Men's artistic gymnastics
- College team: Illinois Fighting Illini; Saint Louis Billikens; (1952–1954, c. 1949-c. 1950)
- Club: Beaumont High School
- Head coach: Charlie Pond
- Former coach: Walter Eberhardt
- Retired: 1954

Frank Lee Bare Sr. (September 13, 1930 – February 25, 2011) was an American gymnast and first executive director of the United States Gymnastics Federation, now called USA Gymnastics. Bare is credited with growing the sport of gymnastics in the United States, and under his leadership, the USGF replaced the Amateur Athletic Union as the governing body for the sport internationally. He oversaw the creation of the American Cup and hosted the first World Artistic Gymnastics Championships held in the Western Hemisphere.

Bare served in leadership positions within the International Gymnastics Federation and was inducted into both the USA Gymnastics Hall of Fame and the International Gymnastics Hall of Fame.

== Early life and education ==
Bare was born on September 13, 1930, in Kennett, Missouri, and grew up in nearby St. Louis. As a youth, he participated in gymnastics at the YMCA and an American Turners center.

He attended Beaumont High School and competed for the school's gymnastics team. He later attended Saint Louis University and University of Illinois Urbana-Champaign.

== Gymnastics career ==
=== As athlete ===
After high school, Bare was a member of the Saint Louis Billikens men's gymnastics team under coach Walter Eberhardt. With Billikins teammate Gil Brinkmeyer, Bare transferred to compete for the Illinois Fighting Illini men's gymnastics team.

Bare was accepted into the university in February 1951 and competed for the Fighting Illini from 1952 to 1954 under coach Charlie Pond. At the 1952 NCAA gymnastics championships, Bare won the side horse (now known as pommel horse) title. With his sights set on making the United States team at the 1956 Summer Olympics, Bare suffered a dislocated elbow on the horizontal bar at the 1954 NCAA gymnastics championships which ended his career.

=== As administrator ===
Bare was named as the first executive director of the United States Gymnastics Federation, now known as USA Gymnastics, in January 1963. According to USA Gymnastics, when Bare took over there were only 7,000 gymnasts competing in the United States and the only major international competitions available were the Summer Olympic Games and the Pan American Games.

Bare oversaw the creation of a World Cup, first hosted in 1969. The USGF was recognized by the International Gymnastics Federation (FIG) in 1970 as the sport's governing body in the United States, replacing the Amateur Athletic Union, after a 20-8 vote. He was the first member of USGF to be named to FIG's executive committee in 1972.

During Bare's tenure, the senior elite level American Cup competition was first held at Madison Square Garden in 1976. He raised the United States' profile internationally and introduced American fans to gymnasts from other nations. Bare was also named a vice-president of FIG in 1976.

The United States hosted the 1979 World Artistic Gymnastics Championships in Fort Worth, Texas, which marked the first time the competition had been held in the Western Hemisphere. Bare stepped down from his posts with USGF and FIG in 1980.

=== Legacy ===
Bare was inducted into the US Gymnastics Hall of Fame in 1984 and the International Gymnastics Hall of Fame in 1999. The latter created the Frank Bare Award given "to individuals who have made exceptional contributions in promoting and growing the sport of gymnastics throughout the United States."

== Personal life ==
Bare joined the army for four years, from 1955 to 1958, following his Illinois Fighting Illini gymnastics career. He had three children, including Frank Bare Jr., with first wife Vera Landon. The couple divorced in 1975 and Bare married Linda Myers in 1996.

In Bare's later years, he was diagnosed with inclusion body myositis. He died in La Jolla on February 25, 2011.
