= Joseph L. McLemore =

Joseph McLemore at the time of his 1928 congressional run

Joseph L. McLemore (November 12, 1902 – November 27, 1971) was a prominent black attorney and politician in St. Louis, Missouri. He is remembered as the first African-American candidate for Congress by the Democratic Party, when he was nominated to the ticket for the election of November 1928. In addition, McLemore was the first black candidate for Congress nominated by any political party in the state of Missouri.

McLemore made a second unsuccessful run for Congress in 1944, playing a role in the renewed civil rights movement in America that emerged during World War II.

== Biography ==
=== Early years ===
Joseph L. McLemore was born near Lake Charles, Louisiana. His father died when he was seven and he was raised by his mother, who worked as a cook for white families of the area.

McLemore recalled that he was 12 years old before he was able to receive formal education. With the consent of his mother he left home at an early age to apprentice for a barber in Galveston, Texas. The barber's wife was influential in motivating McLemore to seek further education, and without funds he relocated to St. Louis to attend summer high school, working to maintain himself and living in the YMCA.

After American entry into World War I in the spring of 1917, McLemore volunteered and went to war in Europe. He served with the rank of private in Company A of the 325th Field Signal Battalion.

After his return he resumed high school, graduating from Sumner High School in St. Louis in 1919. He was admitted to Howard University in Washington, DC, from which he obtained a bachelor's degree in 1922.

=== Legal career ===
McLemore then enrolled in New York University School of Law, where he developed a specialty in constitutional law. He graduated from NYU law with a Master of Laws degree in 1923.

After passing the Missouri bar exam, McLemore began practicing law in St. Louis in 1923. He was elected president of the Mound City Bar Association in January 1927.

In the 1930s, McLemore was the senior partner of the St. Louis legal firm McLemore, Witherspoon, and Lucas, working with attorneys R.L. Witherspoon and V.H. Lucas. He was appointed by Mayor Bernard F. Dickmann as assistant in the city's legal aid bureau, resigning the post in the fall of 1937 to help with the expansion of his general law practice.

McLemore was also involved in various community pursuits, as president of the board of curators of Lincoln University, a historically black college located in Jefferson City, Missouri, as well as serving on the board of managers of Pine Street YCMA and a member of the board of directors of the New Age Building and Loan Association.

McLemore left St. Louis in 1946, where he took a position as a guest professor of law at the University of the Philippines and was named a prosecutor in Japanese war crimes trials.

He later moved to Washington, DC to take a job as an attorney for the federal Office of Price Administration.

About 1950, McLemore relocated to New York and took up the practice of law there. He remarried in 1957, wedding the former Louise Francis of Newark, New Jersey, with the couple making their home in Bronx, New York. During this period McLemore was sometimes associated with legal matters involving alleged civil rights violation, such as his participation in a 1959 suit against the White Tower restaurant chain for refusing service to a black newspaper reporter because of her race.

=== Congressional campaigns ===
==== 1928 ====
In August 1928, McLemore was tapped as the nominee of the Democratic Party for Congress for an urban district in St. Louis. To the surprise of many, McLemore emerged from the primary election as the Democratic nominee after defeating a white opponent, E.G. Hancock, by more than 1,000 votes.

1928 campaign ad for "Brilliant Young Attorney" Joseph McLemore

McLemore was believed to be "the first Negro nominated for Congress by Democrats anywhere" at the time of his selection, and the 32-year old went into a race against eight-term Republican representative L. C. Dyer, a progressive and namesake of the Dyer Anti-Lynching Bill of 1918.

McLemore's candidacy proved a boon in the race-baiting politics of his native Louisiana, with his picture figuring prominently on a political circular warning white voters about "Al Smith's Negro Democrats." Anti-Herbert Hoover forces proved no more honorable in their tactics, issuing a circular of their own demonizing a black Republican candidate for Congress from Chicago, Oscar de Priest.

Despite a noble effort, on the eve of the election the result in the 12th Congressional District seemed in little doubt, with a writer for the St. Louis Globe-Democrat declaring:

"It seems probable now that the lineup from Missouri in the next national House of Representatives will not be changed. Democrats nominated Joseph L. McLemore, a Negro, against Congressman L.C. Dyer in the 12th (St. Louis) District, but nobody expects McLemore to be elected. Dyer predicted he will carry every voting precinct in the entire district."

McLemore would indeed be one of four losing Democratic candidates for Congress on November 6, with L.C. Dyer winning a 9th consecutive term of office by a margin of 58.4% to 41.6%. Democrats largely swept the election in Missouri, however, winning 12 of the state's 16 congressional seats.

==== 1944 ====
It would not be until 1944 that McLemore again put his hat in the political ring, running for Congress again, this time in the restructured Missouri 11th Congressional District. This time McLemore — older, more established, and more confident — pulled no punches in making civil rights a leading issue in his campaign, declaring in one public address:

"The most vicious German or Japanese spy could enjoy in the United States the fullest measure of civil courtesies, privileges, and protection, while the greatest dark benefactors to their native America, like Carver or Drew of the Red Cross Blood Bank or Marian Anderson or Roland Hayes or Robeson of the art world were denied even the simplest of American courtesies.

"They are slaves, yet they are free, these black men. They fight for democracy, yet they have no democracy. They symbolize equality and their very position denies equality. They are in the great struggle against totalitarianism, yet they themselves are the helpless victims of the vices of totalitarianism."

This time McLemore was unable to emerge from the August primary election, however, finishing third in a three-way race, with 22.4% of the vote. While incumbent Congressman John B. Sullivan won the nomination, he was ultimately defeated in the November general election.

==== 1964 ====
A third congressional campaign was launched in 1964 in the 22nd New York Congressional District of the Bronx, running for the seat held by establishment Democrat Jacob H. Gilbert. The result was even more discouraging for McLemore in the June primary, with just 565 votes recorded in his column — a distant third place finish to the more than 11,200 votes gathered by Gilbert.

== Death and legacy ==
Joseph McLemore died November 27, 1971, at Lenox Hill Hospital in Manhattan after a three-month illness. While his age at death was reported in the New York Daily News as 72, and in the St. Louis Post-Dispatch as 75, according to the headstone placed at Long Island National Cemetery he was born November 12, 1902, making him 69 at death.

== Works ==
- Winning the War and the Peace that Follows. Monticello College Council on War Effort, 1942.

== See also ==
- 1928 United States House of Representatives elections
