= Robin Wright-Jones =

American politician (born 1950)

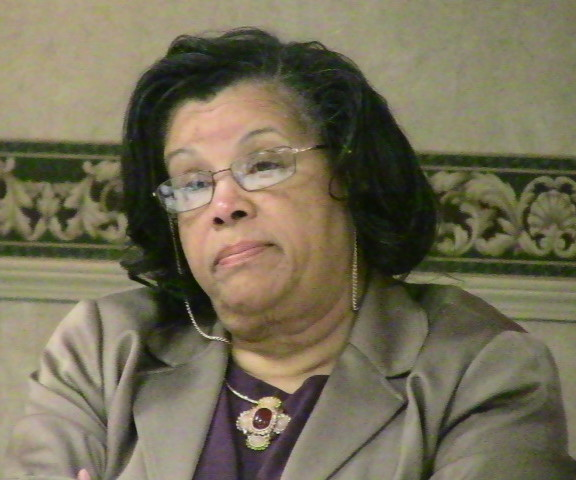

Member of the Missouri Senate from the 5th district
- In office 2009 - 2013
- Preceded by: Maida Coleman
- Succeeded by: Jamilah Nasheed

Member of the Missouri House of Representatives from the 63rd district
- In office 2002 - 2009
- Preceded by: Maida Coleman
- Succeeded by: Tishaura Jones

Personal details
- Born: January 31, 1950 (age 76) St. Louis, Missouri
- Party: Democratic
- Education: University of Missouri, St. Louis
- Occupation: Real estate broker, small business owner

Robin Wright-Jones (born January 31, 1950) was a Democratic member of the Missouri Senate, representing the 5th district from 2007 to 2013. Jamilah Nasheed succeeded her in this office. Her district covers part of City of St. Louis. She previously served as a member of the Missouri House of Representatives from 2002 through 2007, after winning a special election on March 26, 2002.

Robin Wright-Jones was fined $271,580 in 2013 for violations of Missouri law that bars candidates from converting campaign funds to personal use. The fine was for failure to accurately report contributions, failure to report expenditures, improperly reporting consulting fees and cash expenditures. This fine was later reduced to $229,964.

Wright-Jones appealed and in February 2018 the Missouri Supreme Court upheld the state ethics commission's judgment against her.
