= Myrtle Foster Cook =

American activist (1870–1951)

- Born: Myrtle Foster; April 17, 1870; Amherstburg, Ontario, Canada
- Died: August 31, 1951 (aged 81); Los Angeles, California, USA
- Other name: Myrtle Foster Dodd (after first marriage)
- Occupations: Activist, educator, clubwoman

Myrtle Foster Cook (April 17, 1870 – August 31, 1951) was a Canadian-born American teacher, political activist, and clubwoman.

== Early life ==
Myrtle Foster was born in Amherstburg, Ontario and raised in Monroe, Michigan, the daughter of James William Foster and Elizabeth Butler Foster. Both of her grandfathers escaped slavery in the United States, assisted by the Underground Railroad, and settled in Canada. Her father had a fruit and dairy farm in Monroe, and her sisters ran a candy business. She graduated from the University of Michigan.

== Career ==
Foster was a church organist and Sunday school teacher in her youth in Michigan. She was teaching at a normal school in Frankfort, Kentucky when she met her first husband, a doctor. She moved with him to Muskogee, Oklahoma, where she taught school, started a club, organized a lecture series, and raised funds to build a hospital.

Foster moved to Kansas City, Missouri in 1916. She was head of the English department at Lincoln High School, and met her second husband, a fellow teacher. The Cooks established a savings and loan association for African Americans. Myrtle Foster Cook was national chair of the NAACP's legal defense fund. She was a leader in the Kansas City chapters of the YWCA and the National Association of Colored Women (NACW). She was editor-manager of the NACW's National Notes from 1922 to 1926, and chaired the NACW's history department later in the 1920s, when she spoke on a conference panel with Carter G. Woodson, Sallie Wyatt Stewart, and Arsania Williams. In 1934 she was elected president of the NACW's Central District.

Cook organized to create the Jackson County Home for Negro Boys, and was a leader of the Women's League of Kansas City. She was appointed by governors Sam Aaron Baker and Arthur M. Hyde to the Missouri Negro Educational and Industrial Commission (MNEIC). She was active in suffrage work, and in Republican Party politics after the vote was won. She held various leadership roles in the 1920 and 1924 election cycles, and in 1928, Cook was named to the National Republican Executive Committee, working with Addie Waites Hunton on the Hoover campaign.

== Personal life ==
Myrtle Foster married twice. Her first husband was Dr. Louis G. Dodd. They married in 1900, and he died in 1911. Her second husband was Hugh Oliver Cook, who was principal of Lincoln High School from 1921 to 1944. They married in 1920, and she became stepmother to his young sons. The Cooks moved to Los Angeles in 1944, and Hugh O. Cook died there in 1949. She died in Los Angeles in 1951, aged 81 years.
