= Ivan C. James, Jr. =

American engineer

Ivan C. James, Jr. (1916–2014) was an American engineer and historian in St. Louis.

== Personal life ==
Ivan Cecil James, Jr. was born on May 23, 1916, in Nashville, Tennessee, to Ivan C. James and Lottie B. James. He attended West Bell School, Sumner High School, Lincoln University, and the Milwaukee School of Engineering.

James graduated from Sumner High School and subsequently attended Lincoln University in Jefferson City, Missouri.

After Lincoln University, James attended a historically all-white school, the Milwaukee School of Engineering. He and two fellow Lincoln University graduates were the first African-Americans to attend the school. He took a personal interest in recruiting more African-Americans to follow in their footsteps.

Upon graduation, he returned to St. Louis and sought to find a job as an engineer. He married Juanita Maude Perkins on December 9, 1940, in a civil ceremony. On January 29, 1941, the couple were married in a religious ceremony at St. Elizabeth Catholic Church.

James died on October 9, 2014, at the age of 98, and was buried at Jefferson Barracks National Cemetery.

== Career ==
James was hired by Emerson Electric, where he ran a punch press. As James recounted in Lift Every Voice and Sing, he was the first African-American hired by the company "for any job other than porter." But his ultimate goal was to become a stationary engineer. James was a fireman at Homer G. Phillips Hospital before gaining his engineering license and working as an engineer for the St. Louis Housing Authority at Carr Square Village, Pruitt-Igoe, and the south side, which included the Darst-Webbe-Peabody complex.

Outside work, James collected African-American historical materials, such as books and pamphlets, which he donated for preservation in later life. The State Historical Society of Missouri holds the Ivan C. James Papers, while the Missouri Historical Society possesses two collections of James' materials: the Ivan C. James, Jr. Photograph Collection and the Ivan C. James, Jr. Collection, which are housed in the Society's Photographs & Prints and Archives departments, respectively. Many of the items James collected document the history of African-American Catholics in St. Louis.

James was the author of The History of Black Catholicism in St. Louis, a short study of African-Americans' Catholic heritage in the city, from the original settlement of St. Louis through the civil rights activism and segregationist resistance of the twentieth century. James described population shifts and the evolution of particular hubs of African-American Catholic life, such as St. Elizabeth Catholic Church, which closed in 1950.
