= Keith English (politician) =

American politician

Member of the Missouri House of Representatives from the 68th district
- In office January 2013 – January 2017
- Succeeded by: Jay Mosley

Personal details
- Born: November 4, 1967 St. Louis, Missouri
- Died: February 28, 2018 (aged 50) Jefferson City, Missouri
- Party: Independent
- Other political affiliations: Democratic (before 2015)
- Education: Hazelwood Central High School (1986); Saint Louis University
- Occupation: American politician, union electrician, business owner

Keith English (November 4, 1967 – February 28, 2018) was an American politician, union electrician, and business owner from the state of Missouri. English served as a member of the Missouri House of Representatives from Florissant, Missouri. He was elected to his first two-year term in November 2012.

== Biography ==
English was born in St. Louis, Missouri. He graduated from Hazelwood Central High School in 1986 and attended Saint Louis University. He graduated from the IBEW Joint Apprenticeship Training Center in 1989. He grew up in Florissant and previously served as a Florissant city councilman for more than five years.

English was a former Mixed Martial Arts (MMA) trainer and enthusiast, who took up fighting professionally after the death of his mother in 2008. English fought as an MMA fighter from 2008 to the fall of 2012, when he retired, with a record of 10 wins and 0 losses. He routinely gave his winnings to charity.

=== 2014 tax cut vote ===
English made national news in 2014 when he was the only Democrat to vote to reduce Missouri's state income tax for the first time in nearly a century by voting to override the veto of Democratic Governor Jay Nixon. The vote was 109–46 with English providing the pivotal vote. English contended that the governor had spread "misinformation" about the bill. Immediately following the vote, English was removed from four House committees by House Minority Leader and fellow union electrician Jake Hummel.

English was re-elected to a second term in November 2014, and subsequently appealed to have his committee assignments restored. When that proved unsuccessful, English resigned his Democratic Party membership and announced that he would serve as an Independent.

== Marijuana ==
At the start of the 2015 legislative session, English introduced a bill that would, if enacted, legalize medical marijuana in the state.

== Death ==
English died of an apparent suicide on February 28, 2018, in a parking lot, in Jefferson City, Missouri. The police recovered a firearm from the scene.
