= Steve Roberts (Missouri politician) =

American politician

Member of the Missouri Senate from the 5th district
- Incumbent
- Assumed office January 6, 2021
- Preceded by: Jamilah Nasheed

Member of the Missouri House of Representatives from the 77th district
- In office January 4, 2017 – January 6, 2021
- Preceded by: Kimberly Gardner
- Succeeded by: Kimberly-Ann Collins

Personal details
- Born: 1988 or 1989 (age 37–38) St. Louis, Missouri, U.S.
- Party: Democratic
- Education: University of Miami (BS); Pepperdine University (JD)

Military service
- Allegiance: United States
- Branch/service: United States Air Force
- Rank: Captain
- Unit: Air National Guard

Steven Roberts (born 1988/1989) is an American politician. He is a member of the Missouri Senate from the 5th district, serving since 2020. He previously represented the 77th district in the Missouri House of Representatives from 2017 to 2021. He is a member of the Democratic Party.

== Early life and education ==
Steven Craig Roberts, II was born in St. Louis, Missouri to Eva Frazer, a medical doctor, and Steven Craig Roberts, Sr., a former St. Louis alderman.

Roberts graduated from the University of Miami with a Bachelor of Science in Psychology and Communication Studies and received his Juris Doctor degree from Pepperdine University School of Law. In law school, Roberts worked in the U.S. Congress as a legislative intern; as a certified law clerk with the District Attorney's Office in Compton, California; and assisted the Counsel to Secure Justice in New Delhi, India. During his final semester, Roberts worked with a clinic in Los Angeles, California that assisted with refugees fleeing persecution obtain asylum in the United States.

After completing law school, Roberts joined AP Wireless Infrastructure Partners, LLC.

== Military career ==
Roberts joined the Missouri Air National Guard in 2018. After completing the Total Force Officer Training at Maxwell Air Force Base, Roberts was commissioned as a Second Lieutenant in the United States Air Force; dually serving as both a member of the Missouri Air National Guard as well as a member of the United States Air Force.

Roberts was promoted to the rank of Captain after graduating from the United States Air Force's Judge Advocate Staff Officer Course (JASOC) in 2021.

== Political career ==
=== Circuit Attorney's office ===
Roberts served as a St. Louis assistant circuit attorney when he was arrested for sexual assault in April 2015. Roberts was suspended by the Circuit Attorney's Office and the Circuit Attorney's Office launched an independent investigation into Roberts. Jillian S. Anderson, an assistant prosecuting attorney in St. Charles County, served as the outside investigator. Following Anderson's investigation, the office deferred prosecution of Roberts and ended his suspension.

In October 2015, St. Louis Circuit Attorney Jennifer Joyce fired Roberts. While Roberts' spokesperson claimed the office did not provide a reason for firing him, Circuit Attorney Joyce stated, “we can say conclusively that his termination was a result of his poor performance. No other factors were involved.”

Joyce also further elaborated that Roberts was “provided written notice of his performance issues and he has met dozens of times with his supervisors who worked diligently to help him succeed at the office. The Circuit Attorney’s Office has been more than fair with Mr. Roberts, including allowing him to return to the office after no charges were filed following his recent arrest.” Roberts maintains he was asked to resign after he began collecting campaign money to run for Circuit Attorney.

=== Missouri Legislature ===
Roberts defeated three opponents during the 2016 Missouri House of Representatives District 77 Democratic primary and served 2 two-year terms. He ran unopposed in the general election. Incumbent Roberts then defeated Kimberly-Ann Collins in his second Democratic primary on August 7, 2018, and won the general election on November 6, 2018. While in the House, he was selected by his colleagues to serve as Chairman of the Missouri Legislative Black Caucus.

In 2020, Roberts successfully ran for the Missouri Senate’s 5th District. Roberts' election on January 6, 2021, made him the youngest black State Senator in Missouri history. In November 2024, he was selected as assistant minority floor leader.

In February 2023, Roberts co-filed legislation with Brian Williams to compensate the wrongly accused and exonerated.

In 2024, Roberts blocked four Mike Parson nominations from his district to state boards, alleging a lack of communication from the governor's office. Parson's press secretary told press that there had been communication, and that Roberts had advocated for positions for himself and his father. All four nominees, including Lyda Krewson, were appointed later in the year.

In March 2025, Roberts negotiated provisions in a bill to re-institute state control of the St. Louis Police and attempted to filibuster the bill with colleague Karla May.

In April 2025, Roberts was the only member of either House or Senate to vote against a bill to void non-disclosure agreements in child sexual abuse cases.

=== U.S. Congress ===
Roberts ran for U.S. Congress in Missouri's 1st congressional district, running against incumbent Congresswoman Cori Bush, in which he garnered 26.6% of the vote in the Democratic primary.

== Electoral history ==
=== 2016 ===
Missouri's 77th State House of Representatives District, Democratic Primary Election, August 2, 2016
Party	Candidate	Votes	%	±%
Democratic	Steve Roberts	1,900	39.57%	N/A
Democratic	John Collins-Muhammad	1,280	26.66%	N/A
Democratic	Jesse Todd	966	20.12%	N/A
Democratic	Brian Elsesser	656	13.66%	N/A
Total votes		4,802	100	

Missouri's 77th State House of Representatives District, General Election, November 8, 2016
Party	Candidate	Votes	%	±%
Democratic	Steve Roberts	12,142	100%	N/A
Total votes		12,142	100	

=== 2018 ===
Missouri's 77th State House of Representatives District, Democratic Primary Election, August 7, 2018
Party	Candidate	Votes	%	±%
Democratic	Steve Roberts	3,212	53.01%	+13.44
Democratic	Kimberly-Ann Collins	2,847	46.99%	N/A
Total votes		6,059	100	

Missouri's 77th State House of Representatives District, General Election, November 6, 2018
Party	Candidate	Votes	%	±%
Democratic	Steve Roberts	10,834	100%	0
Total votes		10,834	100	

=== 2020 ===
Missouri's 5th State Senate District, Democratic Primary, August 4, 2020
Party	Candidate	Votes	%	±%
Democratic	Steve Roberts	12,293	35.43%	N/A
Democratic	Megan Ellyia Green	11,241	32.40%	N/A
Democratic	Michelle Sherod	7,817	22.53%	N/A
Democratic	William C. (Bill) Haas	2,068	5.96%	N/A
Democratic	Jeremiah Church	893	2.57%	N/A
Democratic	McFarlane Duncan	387	1.11%	N/A
Total votes		34,699	100	

Missouri's 5th State Senate District, General Election, November 3, 2020
Party	Candidate	Votes	%	±%
Democratic	Steve Roberts	56,379	87.10%	
Republican	Michael Hebron	8,349	12.90%	
Democratic hold				
Total votes		64,728	100	

=== 2022 U.S. Congress ===
Missouri 1st Congressional District Democratic Primary, 2022
Party	Candidate	Votes	%
Democratic	Cori Bush (incumbent)	65,326	69.5
Democratic	Steve Roberts	25,015	26.6
Democratic	Michael Daniels	1,683	1.8
Democratic	Ron Harshaw	1,065	1.1
Democratic	Earl Childress	929	1.0
Total votes		94,018	100.0

== Sexual assault allegations ==
In April 2015, Roberts was arrested by St. Louis Metropolitan Police on suspicion of second degree sodomy toward Saint Louis University student Amy Harms a week prior. In April 2017, the accuser's claim of infliction of emotional distress was dismissed. Roberts settled a civil case arising from the incident for $100,000.

In 2016, incoming State Representative Cora Faith Walker accused Roberts of rape, which Roberts denied and, in response, filed a defamation lawsuit against Walker. In 2019, both Roberts and Walker dropped their respective legal actions, with their lawyers saying: "No money was paid in exchange for the dismissal of the parties' claims." The settlement required confidentiality from both parties, a $100,000 fine for each violation, and a statement in Walker's name disputing any claim of assault, which Roberts said the recently deceased Walker violated.

In 2022, allegations against Roberts resurfaced when it was found that content was removed from his Wikipedia page, from a Missouri State Capitol IP address.
