= Chanel Mosley =

American politician

Member of the Missouri House of Representatives from the 75th district
- Incumbent
- Assumed office January 8, 2025
- Preceded by: Alan Gray

Personal details
- Party: Democratic
- Relations: Alan Gray (uncle); Rochelle Walton Gray (aunt)
- Parent(s): Angela Mosley (mother); Jay Mosley (father)

Chanel Mosley is an American politician who was elected to the Missouri House of Representatives from the 75th district in 2024. She entered office in January 2025.

Mosley succeeded her uncle Alan Gray who is the husband of her aunt Rochelle Walton Gray. Her sister Janay Mosley ran unsuccessfully for the seat held by her father.

Her parents are state legislators Angela Mosley and Jay Mosley.
