= Jay Mosley =

American politician

Member of the Missouri House of Representatives from the 68th district
- In office January 2017 – January 8, 2025
- Preceded by: Keith English
- Succeeded by: Kem Smith

Personal details
- Born: Sacramento, California, U.S.
- Party: Democratic
- Spouse: Angela Mosley
- Children: 3 (including Chanel Mosley)
- Education: Grambling State University (BA)

Jay Mosley is an American politician who served as a member of the Missouri House of Representatives from 2017 to 2025, representing the 68th district. Elected in November 2016, he began office in January 2017.

== Early life and education ==
Mosley was born and raised in Sacramento, California. After graduating from Rio Linda High School, he earned a Bachelor of Science degree in leisure studies and therapeutic recreation from Grambling State University.

== Career ==
From 2004 to 2009, Mosley served as a firefighter in Berkeley, California. Since 2012, he has worked as a shuttle driver. Mosley was elected to the Missouri House of Representatives in November 2016 and assumed office in January 2017. In the 2021–2022 legislative session, Mosely is the ranking member on the Consent and House Procedure Committee.

== Personal life ==
His wife Angela Mosley is state senator and his daughter Chanel Mosley is the member of the Missouri House of Representatives for the 75th district.

== Electoral history ==
=== State representative ===
Missouri House of Representatives primary election, District 68, August 2, 2016
Party	Candidate	Votes	%	±%
Democratic	Jay Mosley	2,267	56.435%	
Democratic	Bert Atkins	1,750	43.565%	
Total votes		4,017	100.00%	

Missouri House of Representatives election, District 68, November 8, 2016
Party	Candidate	Votes	%	±%
Democratic	Jay Mosley	9,863	57.09%	−9.19
Independent	Keith English	7,414	42.91%	+42.91
Total votes		17,277	100.00%	

Missouri House of Representatives election, District 68, November 6, 2018
Party	Candidate	Votes	%	±%
Democratic	Jay Mosley	12,417	100.00%	+42.91

Missouri House of Representatives primary election, District 68, August 4, 2020
Party	Candidate	Votes	%	±%
Democratic	Jay Mosley	4,611	68.26%	−31.74
Democratic	Mike Moehlenkamp	2,144	31.74%	N/A
Total votes		6,755	100.00%	

Missouri House of Representatives election, District 68, November 3, 2020
Party	Candidate	Votes	%	±%
Democratic	Jay Mosley	14,400	100.00%	0.00

Missouri House of Representatives Primary Election, District 68, August 2, 2022
Party	Candidate	Votes	%	±%
Democratic	Jay Mosley	2,336	60.56%	−7.70
Democratic	Pamela Paul	990	25.67%	n/a
Democratic	Don Houston	531	13.77%	n/a
Total votes		3,857	100.00%	

Missouri House of Representatives Election, November 8, 2022, District 68
Party	Candidate	Votes	%	±%
Democratic	Jay Mosley	8,128	100.00%	0.00
