= Tommie Pierson Jr. =

American pastor and politician

Member of the Missouri House of Representatives from the 66th district
- In office January 4, 2017 – January 5, 2021
- Preceded by: Tommie Pierson Sr.
- Succeeded by: Marlene Terry

Personal details
- Born: 1973 (age 52–53) St. Louis, Missouri, U.S.
- Party: Democratic
- Spouse: Zorata Pierson
- Children: 3
- Education: Washington University in St. Louis (BA); Covenant Theological Seminary (MA)

Tommie L. Pierson Jr. (born 1973) is an American pastor and politician who served as a Democratic member of the Missouri House of Representatives from 2017 to 2021. He represented the 66th district, which covers parts of St. Louis County and the city of St. Louis.

== Early life and education ==
Pierson is the son of Tommie Pierson Sr., a former state representative. He graduated from Parkway North High School in 1991 and from Washington University in St. Louis in 1995. Pierson received a Master of Arts from Covenant Theological Seminary in 2009.

== Career ==
Pierson is the pastor of the InStep Church in St. Charles, Missouri.

When his father vacated his legislative seat in order to run for Lieutenant Governor of Missouri, the younger Pierson announced he would run for the seat. Pierson prevailed in a three-way Democratic primary and defeated Republican John Saxton in the general election.

In 2019, he was elected assistant floor leader for the Democratic party in the Missouri House of Representatives.

== Personal life ==
Pierson and his wife, Zorata, have three children.

== Electoral history ==
=== State representative ===
Missouri House District 66 Democratic primary, 2016
| Party | Candidate | Votes | % |
|---|---|---|---|
| Democratic | Tommie Pierson Jr. | 2,131 | 54.97% |
| Democratic | Marlene Terry | 1,181 | 30.46% |
| Democratic | Khalil Abdul Mumin | 565 | 14.57% |
| Total votes | | 3,877 | 100.0% |

Missouri House District 66 election, 2016
| Party | Candidate | Votes | % |
|---|---|---|---|
| Democratic | Tommie Pierson Jr. | 11,882 | 88.77% |
| Republican | John A. Saxton | 1,503 | 11.23% |
| Total votes | | 13,385 | 100.00% |

Missouri House District 66 Primary Election, 2018
| Party | Candidate | Votes | % |
|---|---|---|---|
| Democratic | Tommie Pierson Jr. | 4,812 | 76.30% |
| Democratic | Khalil Abdul Mumin | 1,495 | 23.70% |
| Total votes | | 6,307 | 100.00% |

Missouri House District 66 Election, 2018
| Party | Candidate | Votes | % |
|---|---|---|---|
| Democratic | Tommie Pierson Jr | 10,374 | 99.98% |
| Write-in | | 2 | 0.02% |
| Total votes | | 10,376 | 100.00% |

=== State Senate ===
Missouri Senate District 13 Primary Election, 2020
| Party | Candidate | Votes | % |
|---|---|---|---|
| Democratic | Angela Mosley | 13,580 | 41.21% |
| Democratic | Tommie Pierson Jr. | 13,219 | 40.11% |
| Democratic | Alan (Al) Green | 6,156 | 18.68% |
| Total votes | | 32,955 | 100.00% |
