= Beaumont High School (St. Louis) =

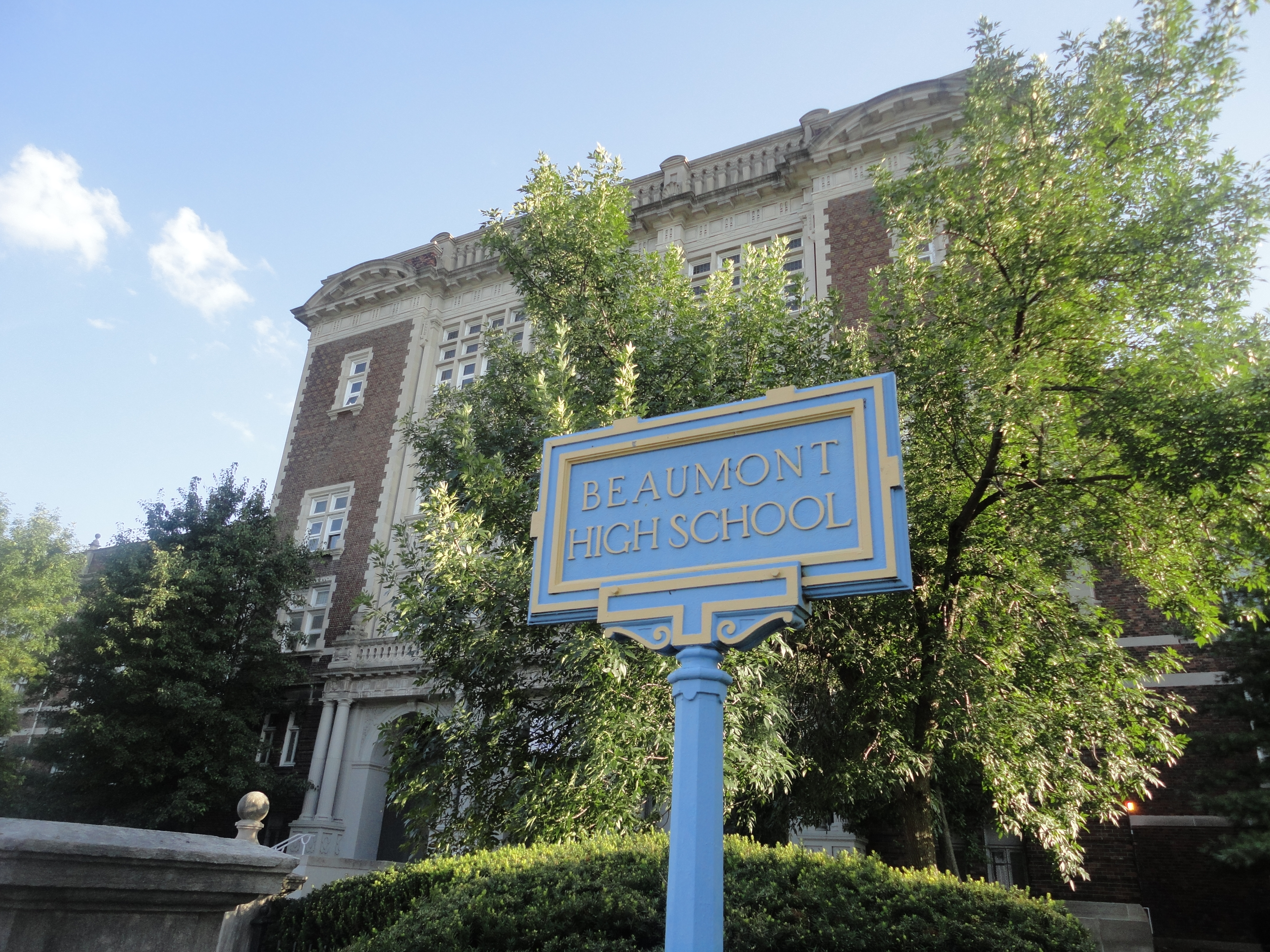
- Signage and front of Beaumont High School, July 2010

Location
- 3836 Natural Bridge Avenue; St. Louis, Missouri 63107; United States; 38.6626°N 90.2219°W

Information
- Type: Comprehensive Public High School
- Opened: 1926
- Closed: 2014
- School district: St. Louis Public Schools
- Superintendent: Kelvin Adams
- Principal: Michael Brown
- Faculty: 35.20 (on an FTE basis)
- Grades: 9–12
- Enrollment: 357 (2019-20)
- Student to teacher ratio: 10.14
- Colors: Blue and gold
- Nickname: Bluejackets
- Newspaper: Beaumont Speaks
- Yearbook: Caduceus

Beaumont High School was a public high school in St. Louis, Missouri, United States. It has been converted to a technical school, hosting a number of CTE programs today. It is part of the St. Louis Public Schools. It was closed as a high school after the final graduating class on May 14, 2014, but continues its career training mission. After Beaumont was founded in 1926, it became noted for producing several Major League Baseball players in the 1940s and 1950s. During the Civil Rights Movement, the high school's integration was featured in a documentary film that was nominated for an Academy Award. After the closure of Little Rock Central High School after its integration crisis, three members of the Little Rock Nine completed coursework at Beaumont. After the 1970s, however, the school re-segregated as an all-black school, and from the 1970s through the 1990s, the school suffered deteriorating physical conditions, security, and academics.

After a renovation in the early 1990s, the school's physical condition improved, but gang violence at the school led to several incidents, including a classroom invasion by a group of armed youth in 1994. The school continued to struggle with a high dropout rate and low standardized test scores. As of 2010, the school offered its nearly 800 students a variety of athletics and activities, including football, basketball, cross country and track, Future Business Leaders of America, Health Occupation Students of America, and job shadowing programs. It also had several notable alumni, including more than a dozen Major League Baseball or NFL players, and a variety of political and education leaders. For the 2011–2012 school year, Beaumont was converted into a 10th through 12th grade technical high school and no longer accepted 9th grade students.

== History ==
=== Construction and early years ===
Due to the limited space at Yeatman High School, the city's only high school for whites on the north side, the St. Louis Public Schools ordered the construction of Beaumont High School in 1925. The cost of land acquisition for the school was $200,000, which purchased Robison Field, the home of the St. Louis Cardinals from 1893 to 1920. Designed by R.M. Milligan, the school was built at a cost of more than $1.5 million and opened in January 1926 with a capacity of 3,500 students. The school was named for the early St. Louis surgeon, William Beaumont, after a petition from the St. Louis Medical Society in December 1922. Prior to its renovation in the 1990s, the original building had five levels including the basement and attic level, 96 classrooms, a rifle range in the attic, three tennis courts, and a three-story 2,250-seat auditorium. Its yearbook, the Caduceus, and its original newspaper, The Digest, were tributes to the medical background of the school's namesake.

By 1933, the school had more than 2,800 students, and by 1937, it had increased to 3,100 students. Beaumont produced several notable Major League Baseball players from the late 1930s through the early 1950s. In 1944 alone, the school's baseball team had five players who went on to the Major Leagues: Earl Weaver, Roy Sievers, Jim Goodwin, Bob Wiesler and Bobby Hofman.

=== Integration and re-segregation ===
After the Brown v. Board of Education decision in May 1954, the St. Louis Public Schools began to implement their desegregation plan; Beaumont High School, formerly an all-white school, was among the first to desegregate. After Beaumont was racially integrated in September 1954, a knife fight broke out in the school between African American and white students that led to coverage in Jet magazine. Following the incidents, a short documentary film titled A City Decides reenacted the events of integration at the school and portrayed the reaction of teachers to student racial conflict. The film was directed by Charles Guggenheim and aired on NBC affiliates, and in 1956 it was nominated for an Academy Award for Best Documentary Short Subject. However, not all white-black interactions in the 1950s were negative; several black alumni reported initially positive experiences during the integration process. In 1957, three members of the Little Rock Nine transferred to Beaumont to complete some of their high school coursework.

Despite de jure integration by 1955, Beaumont experienced re-segregation during the 1970s to become an all-black high school. It was during this time that Beaumont experienced several racial conflicts; on February 13, 1970, a celebration of Negro History Week (now known as Black History Month) ended early due to racially inflammatory skits. The skits included profanity and depicted an attack on a white teacher who had made racially derogatory remarks, and students were urged to resort to violence. The principal, John A. Nelson, was transferred from the school, and three teachers were fired. The early end to the week's celebration led to an incident in which 20 students damaged school property and assaulted two police officers. Even after a court mandated desegregation transfer program, Beaumont remained a de facto segregated all-black school from the 1980s through the 2000s.

On October 19, 1973, one student; 17-year old William Wiggins was accidentally shot and killed outside of the cafeteria.

On April 21, 1983, one student; 18-year old Byron Puckett was accidentally shot in the abdomen after stepping between two fighting teens in the basement restroom.

=== Physical deterioration and renovation ===
During the 1970s and 1980s, the school saw significant physical deterioration. By the late 1980s, the school's football playing field had deteriorated, and it was often "littered with broken bottles and other hazardous debris". Interior athletic facilities also deteriorated to the extent that the school's junior varsity basketball team was forced to practice on the school auditorium stage. To address some of these issues, the St. Louis Board of Education passed an $7.3 million bond issue in 1990 for renovations at Beaumont. Due to the renovations, Beaumont students were relocated to McKinley High School from 1991 to 1993. The renovations significantly improved conditions at the school, with new lockers, flooring, ceilings, and furniture, while both the swimming pool and auditorium were restored. The school's two gymnasiums were combined into one larger facility.

=== Security issues ===
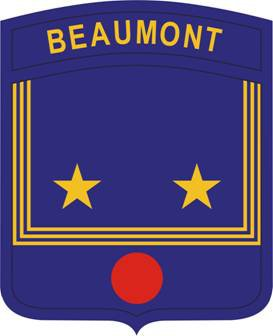
The Beaumont JROTC program shoulder sleeve insignia reflected the "bib" of a sailor's uniform, echoing the school mascot, while the red disc symbolized the surgical work of William Beaumont, the school's namesake.

Despite attempts to improve conditions, crime and gang problems plagued Beaumont in the 1990s: in response to threats of gang violence in March 1991, the St. Louis Police Department surrounded the school with dozens of officers. According to self-reporting from gang members and the police, Beaumont was in Crips territory, although some students affiliated with the Bloods gang also attended. One student estimated in 1991 that as many as 20 percent of students were affiliated with a gang. Although claiming that the gang membership estimate was too high, an administrator admitted that Beaumont did "have some violent students" and "I've known students who have been shot, killed and stabbed." During the 1991 Annie Malone Parade that was to end at Beaumont, gang violence slowed part of the parade near its completion.

In what has been described as the "low point" of Beaumont's history, on February 16, 1994, a gang fight broke out in the cafeteria; following the incident, a group of a dozen armed youth entered a building classroom and threatened to kill one student who had escaped the fight. After a scuffle, the student escaped via a window, and the group fled the building. Following the incident, security was temporarily increased at Beaumont, and St. Louis Mayor Freeman Bosley, Jr. spoke to the student body. With the start of the 1994–1995 school year, Beaumont and the other St. Louis public high schools received metal detectors to reduce the presence of guns on campus. Beaumont administrators also introduced the U.S. Army Junior Reserve Officer Training Corps program. The JROTC program was designed to both reduce the dropout rate at Beaumont and combat the problem of gang activity at the school. In addition to improved security measures, district officials hired Floyd Crues, a former alternative high school principal, to head Beaumont; his changes to school practices were credited with improving the climate at Beaumont. Under Crues, Beaumont's discipline problems decreased, and he received comparisons to New Jersey high school principal Joe Clark, the inspiration for the 1989 film Lean on Me.

Despite increased security measures, violence continued at and near the school: in October 1994, a Beaumont student was shot in the street outside the school as the building was being dismissed. Also, during the JROTC program's first semester in the spring of 1995, one of its students was murdered by another Beaumont student in a case of mistaken identity. During the next year, in October 1995, a Beaumont student shot at a school bus that was taking other students to Lindbergh High School after gang signs were exchanged. On March 1, 1996, in another bus incident, a student shot and critically injured a Beaumont bus driver, and shot and killed a pregnant Beaumont student.

=== Academic issues ===
Starting in the 1970s, academic problems began to surface at Beaumont High School; one student who graduated in 1974 found after testing that she was able to read at only a third grade level. The school also suffered from financial and academic problems in the 1980s and 1990s, with teachers paying for basic supplies and textbooks during the early 1990s. According to an internal report from the St. Louis Public Schools, only 26.1 percent of Beaumont students who entered in September 1984 graduated in June 1988. 40.8 percent officially dropped out, while an additional 19.4 percent "did not return" but also did not request transcripts as a transfer student. In an effort to reduce the dropout rate in 1991, administrators developed "Project Courage", a life skills and self-esteem course. However, its curriculum and standards were weak, and the district was accused of pervasive inequality amid disparities between comprehensive high schools such as Beaumont and newly implemented magnet schools. Project Courage, for its part, had little effect on educational performance.

In 1994, Beaumont in particular was noted for its lack of curricular strength in mathematics and language; advanced English courses were eliminated at the school in 1995 by the board of education, and although a computer-based remedial mathematics program was mandated by court order in 1989, it still had not been implemented by 1994. In response to the allegations of lack of academic rigor at Beaumont, St. Louis Public Schools Superintendent David J. Mahan argued that Beaumont would continue to offer advanced social studies, science and foreign language courses, and that the remedial mathematics program had not been implemented due to the 1991–1993 renovation project. Mahan also argued that "The schools indeed are improving. They are not failing." However, advanced mathematics courses such as calculus were not offered at Beaumont due to lack of student readiness, the drama club was cancelled, and the computer-aided reading program had no computers. By the 1995–1996 school year, some of the problems had been rectified: the mathematics curriculum was upgraded and computer courses were implemented. However, Beaumont lacked both an orchestra and a drama program, and only after inquiries from local media was a band director hired to replace one who had quit three months earlier. Dropout rates remained particularly high through the 1990s; education expert and Harvard professor Gary Orfield noted, "I've never seen a graduation rate as low as I've seen in the central city of St. Louis."

=== Improvements ===
By the late 1990s, security problems at the school had decreased, and both students and faculty noted that the school atmosphere was "calmer". The efforts of Floyd Crues to improve discipline succeeded via a student safety task force, in which students were encouraged to report potential acts of violence. By 1998, Beaumont was regarded as a "turnaround" due to the efforts of Crues, who further instituted zero tolerance policies on gang activity at the school.

Progress also was made during the late 1990s in academic performance. In 1996–1997 school year, more students gained induction into the National Honor Society than had in the previous five years; 10 students met the requirements of a 3.3 grade point average for three consecutive semesters. Some part of the academic progress was credited to the principal, Floyd Crues, who created a school-within-a-school at Beaumont to teach students about banking and finance. The school's finance academy was lauded as one of only two such academies in the state. In January 1999, Monica Washington, a Beaumont senior, presented research at the annual meeting of the American Association for the Advancement of Science. The next year, the Open Society Institute began funding the Urban Debate League, an association of St. Louis high school debate programs; Beaumont thus began its speech and debate program.

In the early 2000s, the finance and jobs program at Beaumont began to show results; students at the school began job shadowing programs throughout the region, while students at the Beaumont Academy of Finance finished third in a national stock-picking contest sponsored by CNBC. After the departure of Floyd Crues, new principal Travis L. Brown continued to attempt to improve academics; in 2001, Brown began to focus efforts on scores on the state achievement tests. It was also in 2001 that Beaumont sprinter Orlando Payton ran a 100 meter dash in 10.2 seconds, which was the best time in the United States for the year. Although academic achievement remained among the worst in the region, graduation rates improved to roughly 50 percent by 2003, nearly double their rate in the mid-1990s.

Security gains remained tenuous, however, as in September 2003, after a significant fight at the school, a student being treated for injuries was discovered with a loaded gun. On the last day of classes of the 2004–2005 school year, police were forced to disperse a brawl of more than 200 students and others outside the school. In October 2008, a fire broke out in a classroom, causing the evacuation of the building; in November 2008, another fire was lit in a bathroom. Investigators ruled both fires as arson. Academic gains also were hampered by the loss of the St. Louis Public School's accreditation during the 2006–2007 school year. After the loss, Beaumont had difficulty replacing a French instructor by the beginning of the 2007–2008 year. Also, the issue of de facto segregation remained; Beaumont's neighborhood boundaries caused its student population to remain solidly all-black through the 2000s.

Later steps taken to curb discipline incidents at the school included the formation of the Young Gentlemen's Club in 2007, in which male students wore ties and attempted to improve their etiquette. In 2007, the school and its principal, Travis Brown, were featured in The New York Times. The article described the building as "loom[ing] over the troubled neighborhood like a castle of trapdoors and passageways", although it also emphasized the positive role of Brown and other administrators in encouraging academics and discipline at the school. During the 2009–2010 school year, Beaumont also became one of the first high schools in the country to offer a respiratory therapy program to teach students hands-on skills.

== Last years as a "traditional" high school ==
As of the 2010–2011 school year, Beaumont operated on an 8:05 am to 3:02 pm schedule. Its principal, Michael Brown, assumed the position in August 2009 after serving as an assistant principal at Clyde C. Miller Career Academy. Starting in 2011–2012, Beaumont was converted into a technical high school with "employment ready" programs. To that end, the school no longer accepted 9th grade students, and 10th through 12th grade students attended a comprehensive high school for half of the school day, then transferred to Beaumont for technical education for the other half of the day. In preparation for the conversion, the school underwent $500,000 in physical upgrades.

The school song was as follows:

Beaumont High, we pledge our love
Let our chorus ring above
Beaumont's warm and friendly walls
Campus broad and ample halls

Pay we now the honor due
To Beaumont's Gold and Blue
The Gold of Youth
The Blue of Truth
and staunch Loyalty.

Seventy seniors graduated on May 14, 2014, as the final class of the 88-year-old institution.

=== Activities ===
For the 2010–2011 school year, the school offered ten activities approved by the Missouri State High School Activities Association (MSHSAA): boys' and girls' basketball, boys' and girls' cross country, boys' and girls' track and field, girls' volleyball, 11-man football, sideline cheerleading, and baseball. In addition to its current activities, Beaumont students have won several state championships, including:

- Baseball: 1956, 1960
- Boys' Basketball: 1933, 1942, 1943, 1947, 1948, 1956
- Boys' Cross Country: 1953, 1957, 1959
- Boys' Swimming and Diving: 1946, 1949, 1950
- Boys' Outdoor Track and Field: 1942, 1944, 1945, 1946, 1960, 1961, 1967
- Boys' Indoor Track and Field: 1959, 1960, 1966

The school has produced three singles and three doubles tennis state champions, and two individual wrestling state champions.

=== Demographics ===
In the 2009–2010 school year, Beaumont had an enrollment of 782 students with 48.7 full-time-equivalent teachers, for a student-teacher ratio of 16.1. Nearly 80 percent of students qualified for free or reduced price lunches. After 2005, more than 99 percent of the student population at Beaumont was African American; in addition to its African American population, during the 2009–2010 school year, two White students and one Hispanic student attended the school.

Percent of students by race
Year	Black	White	Hispanic	Asian
2006	99.6	0.2	0.1	0.0
2007	99.7	0.3	0.0	0.0
2008	99.3	0.4	0.0	0.3
2009	99.3	0.6	0.0	0.1
2010	99.6	0.3	0.1	0.0

Students receiving free or reduced price lunch
Year	Percent
2006	77.3
2007	71.1
2008	59.5
2009	56.9
2010	79.9

Faculty information by year
Year	Average years experience	Percent with master's degree
2006	9.6	28.9
2007	11.4	35.3
2008	10.1	37.6
2009	9.5	36.9
2010	7.4	46.5

Percent of faculty certification by year
Year	Regular certification	Temporary certification	Substitute or no certification
2005	69.7	24.7	5.6
2006	58.9	22.2	18.9
2007	76.7	13.7	9.6
2008	75.9	13.7	9.6
2009	79.6	7.4	13.0

=== Academic and discipline issues ===
For many years Beaumont had a significant dropout rate; for the 2009–2010 school year, more than 42 percent of students dropped out compared to the Missouri state dropout rate at that time of 3.5 percent. Beaumont also had a significant discipline incident rate of 13.9 percent, more than seven times the average Missouri rate. Following the passage of No Child Left Behind in 2001, Beaumont met the requirements for adequate yearly progress (AYP) only once. In 2009, Beaumont students achieved 51.9 percent proficiency in communication arts, allowing the school to meet the annual proficiency target of 59.2 within a confidence interval. In addition, Beaumont graduates averaged lower first and second semester grades during their first year in college than the average Missouri graduate, and as of 2010, more than 80 percent of Beaumont graduates enrolling in a public university in Missouri required remedial coursework in either English or mathematics.

Graduation rates by year
Year	Graduates	Cohort dropouts‡	Graduation rate†
2006	165	272	37.8
2007	158	266	37.3
2008	234	315	42.6
2009	208	455	31.4
2010	189	242	43.9
‡ Cohort dropouts is the number of students from the grade level graduating for that year who dropped out. † Graduation rate is calculated as number of graduates divided by number of graduates plus dropouts, multiplied by 100.

Dropout rates by year
Year	Total dropouts‡	Dropout rate†
2006	378	29.0
2007	295	24.5
2008	306	31.5
2009	305	37.6
2010	293	42.5
‡ Total dropouts is the number of students who dropped out of school for the school year. † Dropout rate is calculated as number of total dropouts/(September enrollment plus transfers in and minus transfers out + September enrollment)/2).

Incident rates by year
Year	Total incidents‡	Incident rate†
2006	330	23.7
2007	369	30.3
2008	211	19.9
2009	244	27.1
2010	109	13.9
‡ Total incidents is the number of incidents in which as a result a student was removed for ten or more consecutive days from a traditional classroom. † Incident rate is calculated as enrollment divided by total incidents.

== Notable people ==
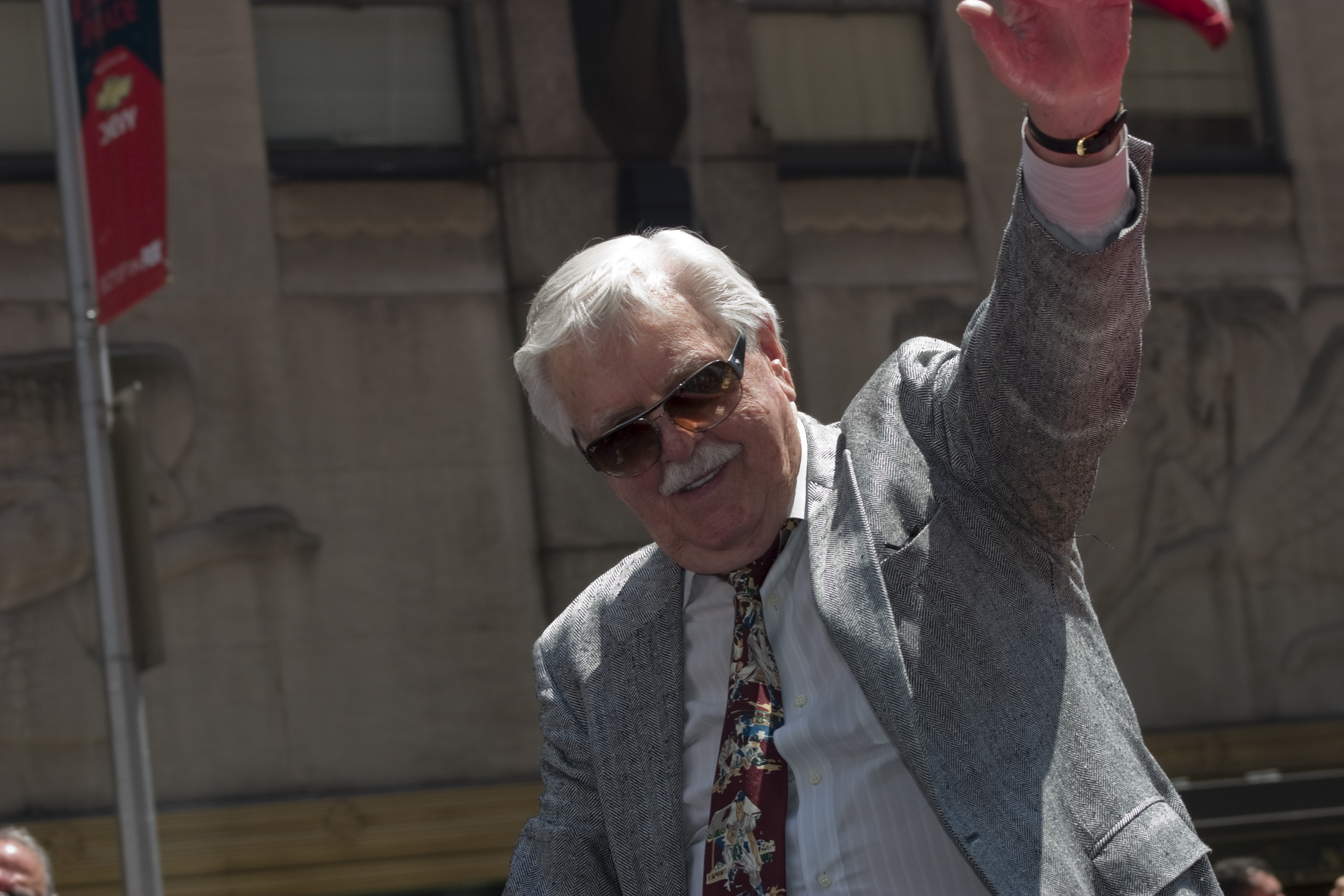
Dick Williams, member of the Major League Baseball Hall of Fame, graduated from Beaumont during the 1940s.

=== Alumni ===
- Frank Bare Sr.: Hall of Fame gymnastics administrator
- Gene Barth: NFL official
- Bud Blattner: Major League Baseball player and broadcaster
- Roy Branch: Major League Baseball player (Seattle Mariners)
- Chuck Diering: Major League Baseball player
- Jim Goodwin: Major League Baseball player
- Bobby Hofman: Major League Baseball player
- Ken Iman: NFL player and coach
- Frank M. Karsten: U.S. Representative from Missouri
- Jack Maguire: Major League Baseball player
- Bobby Mattick: MLB player (Chicago Cubs, Cincinnati Reds) and Toronto Blue Jays manager
- Lloyd Merritt: Major League Baseball player
- Bob Miller: Major League Baseball player
- Joe Moore: first-round pick in 1971 NFL draft
- Tommie Pierson: state representative
- Pete Reiser: MLB player (Brooklyn Dodgers, Boston Braves, Pittsburgh Pirates, Cleveland Indians)
- Bud Schwenk: NFL player
- Roy Sievers: Major League Baseball player
- Cory Spinks: boxer
- Lee Thomas: Major League Baseball player
- Quincy Troupe: poet and journalist
- Earl Weaver: Major League Baseball manager
- Ronnie L. White: Missouri Supreme Court justice; first African American chief justice
- Mary Wickes: film and television actress
- Bob Wiesler: Major League Baseball player
- Dick Williams: Major League Baseball player and manager

=== Others ===
- Elizabeth Eckford: member of Little Rock Nine; attended one course to complete high school requirements
- Will Franklin: fourth-round pick in 2008 NFL draft; attended Beaumont for two years
- Carlotta Walls LaNier: member of the Little Rock Nine; attended one course to complete high school requirements
- Thelma Mothershed: member of Little Rock Nine; attended one course to complete high school requirements
- Pete Reiser: Major League Baseball player; attended Beaumont for two years (David Porter's Biographical dictionary of American sports: 1992–1995)
- Tom Stanton: Major League Baseball player; coached and taught at Beaumont
