= Sumner High School (St. Louis) =

Public high school in Missouri, U.S.

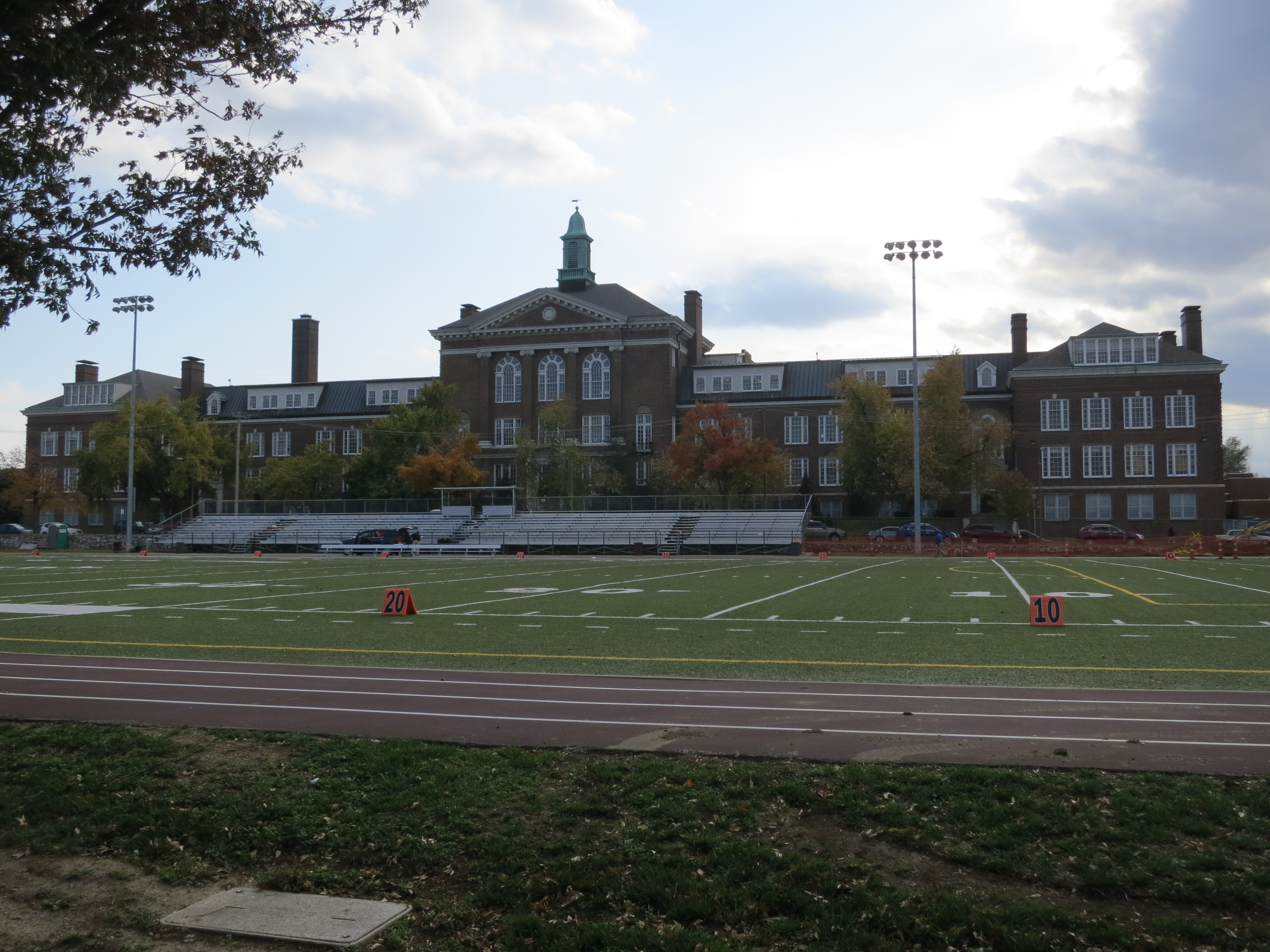
- Sumner High School and football field, October 2012

Location
- 4248 Cottage Avenue; St. Louis, Missouri 63113; United States; 38.6597°N 90.2391°W

Information
- Type: Public high school
- Established: 1875
- School district: St. Louis Public Schools
- NCES School ID: 2929280
- Principal: Ronda Wallace
- Teaching staff: 32.00 FTEs
- Grades: 9-12
- Enrollment: 407 (as of 2024–2025)
- Student to teacher ratio: 12.72
- Colors: Maroon and white
- Athletics conference: Public High League
- Nickname: Bulldogs
- Publication: The Collegiate (defunct)
- Website: School website
- Charles Sumner High School
- U.S. National Register of Historic Places
- Location: 4248 W. Cottage Avenue; St. Louis, Missouri
- Area: 5.5 acres (2.2 ha)
- Built: 1908
- Architect: William B. Ittner
- Architectural style: Colonial Revival; Georgian Revival
- NRHP reference No.: 88000469
- Added to NRHP: April 19, 1988

Sumner High School is a St. Louis public high school that was the first high school for African-American students west of the Mississippi River in the United States. Together with Vashon High School, Sumner was one of only two public high schools in St. Louis City for African-American students and was segregated. Established in 1875 only after extensive lobbying by some of St. Louis' African-American residents, Sumner moved to its current location in 1908. It has historically also been known as Charles H. Sumner High School, and Sumner Stone High School.

As of the 2024-2025 school year, the school had an enrollment of 407 students and 32 classroom teachers (on an FTE basis). There were 407 students eligible for free lunch and 0 (0.0% of students) eligible for reduced-cost lunch.

== History ==
Charlton Tandy led protests of the planned siting of Sumner High School in a heavily polluted area in close proximity to a lead works, lumber and tobacco warehouses, and the train station as well as brothels. He said that black students deserved clean and quiet schools the same way white students do. The location went unchanged, and Sumner High opened in 1875, the first high school opened for African Americans west of the Mississippi. The school is named after the well-known abolitionist senator Charles H. Sumner. The high school was established on Eleventh Street in St. Louis between Poplar and Spruce Street, in response to demands to provide educational opportunities, following a requirement that school boards support black education after Republicans passed the "radical" Constitution of 1865 in Missouri that also abolished slavery.

The school was moved in the 1880s because parents complained that their children were walking past the city gallows and morgue on their way to school.

=== Cottage Avenue campus ===
The current structure, built in 1908, was designed by architect William B. Ittner. Sumner was the only Black public high school in St. Louis City until the opening of Vashon High School in 1927.

Frank Lunsford Williams was principal from 1908 to 1929. Noted instructors included Herman Dreer, Edward Bouchet and Charles H. Turner.

Other later Black high schools in St. Louis County were Douglass High School (opened in 1925) and Kinloch High School (1936).

In 2009, St. Louis Public School Superintendent Kelvin Adams proposed several options with students and parents of how to deal with the problems of the school. He recommended improvements including using Sumner alumni to mentor current students, transferring troublesome students to different schools, and setting achievable goals for the school year.

== Sumner Normal School (1890–1954) ==
In 1890, a normal school was opened at the high school, in order to train more teachers. In its early years the normal school was known as the Cottage Avenue School, and it was located on Cottage Avenue and Pendleton. It also went by the name Sumner Normal School. In 1929, its name was changed to Stowe Teachers College (which later merged to form Harris–Stowe State University), after author Harriet Beecher Stowe and it existed in the former Simmons Colored School campus from 1930 until 1940. The normal school closed in 1954 in the wake of Brown v. Board of Education, the U.S. Supreme Court decision ruling school segregation to be unconstitutional.

Florence Beatty-Brown was a sociology professor at the college.

== Athletics ==
Sumner High's mascot is the Bulldog. Sumner's 1969 basketball team won the Missouri Class L state championship and featured future NBA and ABA players Harry Rogers and Marshall Rogers, as well as David Brent who was a 6th round draft pick for the Los Angeles Lakers. Sports that are currently offered are football, volleyball, basketball, baseball, track and field, tennis, and soccer.

== Campus violence ==
On October 23, 1973, a person was shot during a fight between two gangs.

On March 18, 1975, two students got in a fight and one of the students tried to shoot the other but missed and killed 16-year-old bystander Stephen Goods.

On March 25, 1993, female student Lawanda Jackson shot and killed her ex-boyfriend Tony Hall in a school hallway. Jackson was convicted of first-degree murder and armed criminal action and was sentenced to life without parole but has since been resentenced and paroled.

On October 10, 1996, 17-year-old Lamon Jones was shot and killed by 15-year-old Kembert Thomas during a fight among several students. Thomas was convicted of second-degree murder.

== 2025 tornado damage ==
Sumner High School was among twelve St. Louis schools damaged by a tornado on May 16, 2025. The storm extensively damaged Sumner's roof and some classrooms. St. Louis Public Radio reported, "The recent tornado destroyed parts of Sumner’s roof, damaged some of its tennis courts and downed trees. SLPS reported the storm’s damage and will move Sumner students to Clyde C. Miller College Prep Academy in Grand Center this fall. Alumni are concerned that this move could become an excuse for district officials to shutter the school, though the district says it will not."

According to Andrea Henderson of NPR, "...in an effort to keep one of the city's most storied and impactful schools alive, alumni are working to get Sumner national historic landmark status through the National Park Service."

== Notable alumni ==
- Arthur Ashe (1943–1993), professional tennis player
- Ethel Hedgeman Lyle (1887–1950), founder and "Guiding Light" of Alpha Kappa Alpha
- Chuck Berry (1926–2017), musician in Rock and Roll Hall of Fame
- Lester Bowie (1941–1999), jazz trumpeter
- Grace Bumbry (born 1937–2023), opera singer
- Baikida Carroll (born 1947), trumpeter and composer
- Alvin Cash (1939–1999), musician
- Dianne White Clatto (1938-2015), first African-American weathercaster in the United States
- Bill Clay (born 1931), politician
- Nate Colbert (1946–2023), baseball player
- Billy Davis Jr. (born 1938), singer, The 5th Dimension
- Juan Farrow (born 1958), tennis player
- Dick Gregory (1932–2017), comedian
- Robert Guillaume (1927–2017), actor known for portraying the character Benson DuBois on the ABC sitcom Soap and its spinoff Benson
- Victoria Clay Haley (1877–1926, class of 1895), suffragist and clubwoman
- John Hicks (1941–2006), musician
- Jessie Housley Holliman (1905–1984), educator and artist
- Julius Hunter (born 1943), television news broadcaster
- Ivan C. James Jr. (1916–2014), engineer
- Oliver Lake (born 1942), musician
- Naomi Long Madgett (1923–2020), poet and publisher
- Robert McFerrin (1921–2006), opera singer and father of Bobby McFerrin
- Joseph L. McLemore, class of 1919, attorney and congressional candidate
- Gene Moore (born 1945), basketball player
- Oliver Nelson (1932–1975), jazz musician and composer
- David Peaston (1957–2012), famous R&B singer
- Wendell O. Pruitt (1920–1945), pioneering military pilot and Tuskegee Airman in whose honor the notorious Pruitt–Igoe housing projects were posthumously named
- Bruce Purse, musician, trumpeter and writer
- Roscoe Robinson Jr. (1928–1993), first Black person to reach rank of four-star general in US Army
- Harry Rogers (born 1950), basketball player
- Marshall Rogers (1953–2011), NCAA basketball scoring champion
- Darnay Scott (born 1972), former NFL player. Transferred after his sophomore season
- Moddie Taylor (1912-1976), chemist who specialized in rare earth minerals
- Ronald Townson (1934–2001), singer The 5th Dimension
- Tina Turner (1939–2023), singer in Rock and Roll Hall of Fame
- Harold Wells (born 1938), former NFL player.
- Ernie Wilkins (1922-1999), jazz saxophonist, conductor and arranger
- Arsania Williams (1886–1954), educator and clubwoman in St. Louis
- Margaret Bush Wilson (1919–2009), first Black woman to head the board of NAACP
- Olly Wilson (1937–2018), composer
