= Elbert Walton =

American lawyer

Member of the Missouri House of Representatives
- In office 1979–1993

Personal details
- Born: February 21, 1942 (age 84)
- Party: Democratic
- Spouse: Juanita Head Walton
- Relations: Alan Gray (son-in-law)
- Children: Rochelle Walton Gray; Angela Walton Mosley
- Education: University of Missouri–St. Louis

Elbert A. Walton Jr. (born February 21, 1942) is a former American lawyer and politician.

Walton was born on February 21, 1942, and graduated from the University of Missouri–St. Louis. He was admitted to the Missouri state bar in 1974. Walton served in the Missouri House of Representatives from 1979 to 1993 as a Democrat. In 2009, Walton was fired as chief attorney of the Northeast Ambulance and Fire Protection District after a dispute about legal fees. Walton was suspended from the practice of law following a September 2013 status conference before the U.S. Bankruptcy Court in Missouri's Eastern Judicial District. He was subsequently barred from the court. In 2017, the Missouri Supreme Court heard a court case involving Walton and alleged violations of professional legal ethics. The state supreme court ruled on the case in December 2019, ordering his disbarment. The disbarment took effect by default in January 2020, as Walton had not responded to charges. His daughter Rochelle Walton Gray was a member of the Missouri House of Representatives from 2009 to 2017.
