= Alvin Cash =

American actor and singer

Alvin Cash (born Alvin Welch; February 15, 1939 – November 21, 1999) was an American pop singer and actor.

== Biography ==
Born in St. Louis, Missouri, Cash was a graduate of St. Louis's Sumner High School (also attended by Luther Ingram, Billy Davis Jr., and Tina Turner). Around 1962, he and three of his brothers moved to Chicago, where they performed as a dance act. Cash also searched for a recording contract. Andre Williams, who was the house producer at One-der-ful Records saw them perform as The Crawlers and had them record a tune, "Twine Time," to exploit a popular teen dance that was the rage on the south side of Chicago in late 1963. Released on One-der-ful's Mar-V-Lus imprint in 1964, the tune became a pop hit in January 1965, and whereas 'The Crawlers' proper (Cash's brothers) did not sing on the track, a band called The Nightliters from Louisville, Kentucky, provided the instrumental backing. The "ooh-aah" opening was edited out on some radio stations who thought it too suggestive for their audience.

"Twine Time" became popular in the UK in the Northern soul scene in the 1970s.

The Crawlers name appeared on the two follow-up singles, "The Barracuda" (a national R&B hit in 1965) and "The Penguin," which failed to chart. By the fourth release, the Nightlighters, which had been touring with Cash and backing him on all his sides, were credited as "The Registers," and that credit appeared on the next five Mar-V-Lus singles, namely, "Boston Monkey" (1965), "The Philly Freeze" (a national hit in 1966), "Alvin's Boo-Ga-Loo" (1966), "Doin' the Ali Shuffle" (1967), and "The Charge" (big local Chicago hit in 1967).

Cash went solo after a few further singles, and recorded an album in tribute to Muhammad Ali; he also acted in several blaxploitation films, such as Petey Wheatstraw and Black Bart. He continued performing in the Chicago area into the 1990s. He died from ulcer complications in 1999, at age 60.

== Singles ==
- "Twine Time" (1964) US No. 14, US R&B No. 4
- "The Barracuda" (1965) US No. 59, US R&B No. 29
- "The Philly Freeze" (1966) US No. 49, US R&B No. 12
- "Mr. Penguin"
- "Unwind the Twine"
- "Keep on Dancing" (1968) US No. 66, US R&B No. 14
