= Arsania Williams =

American educator (1875–1954)

- Born: 1875; Baton Rouge, Louisiana
- Died: March 24, 1954 (aged 78–79); Hillsdale, Missouri, U.S.
- Occupations: Educator, clubwoman

Arsania M. Williams (January 1875 – March 24, 1954) was an American educator and clubwoman based in St. Louis, Missouri. She taught for over fifty years in segregated schools, and was president of the Missouri State Association of Negro Teachers, the Missouri Association of Colored Women, and the St. Louis Association of Colored Women. She held national leadership roles in the National Association of Colored Women (NACW).

== Early life and education ==
Arsania M. Williams was born in Baton Rouge, Louisiana, the daughter of George Williams and Julia Williams. She was raised in St. Louis, where she graduated from the normal department of Sumner High School, prepared for a career in teaching. As a young teacher, she presented a paper on school discipline at the state teachers' meeting in 1902.

== Career ==
Williams taught for over fifty years in segregated schools, and was honored by the Missouri State Association of Negro Teachers with a distinguished service medal and a banquet in 1940. One of her students was A'Lelia Walker, daughter of Madame C. J. Walker.

In 1904, Williams served on the committee for the proposed Negro Day event at the Louisiana Purchase Exposition in St. Louis. She was first president of the Wheatley Branch of the YWCA in St. Louis, and in that capacity welcomed W. E. B. Du Bois during his visit to the city in 1913. In 1922, she organized the St. Louis Standard Leadership Training School, for Sunday School teachers and other churchworkers. In 1929, she chaired a panel at the annual meeting of the Association for the Study of Negro Life, featuring Carter G. Woodson, Sallie Wyatt Stewart, and Myrtle Foster Cook.

Williams was president of the Missouri State Association of Negro Teachers, the Missouri Association of Colored Women, and the St. Louis Association of Colored Women. On the national level, she held several executive positions with the National Association of Colored Women (NACW), including vice-president, and program chair for the organization's 50th anniversary celebration in 1946.

== Personal life ==
Williams died in 1954, aged 79 years, at a hospital in Hillsdale, Missouri.
