= Kinloch High School =

Location
- 38.745216°N 90.326444°W

Information
- Type: Public, segregated
- Founded: 1936
- Closed: 1976
- Last updated: 29 December 2017

Kinloch High School was a segregated high school in Kinloch, Missouri, part of St. Louis County. It operated from 1936–1976.

== History ==
Prior to the Civil War, black children were not allowed to receive an education in Missouri. After the Civil War, schooling started for black students. Douglass Elementary School opened in the 1890s and evolved into Douglass High School in the 1920s. Black communities in St. Louis were in such areas as North Webster, and Kinloch. In the 1930s, there was no high school whatsoever in Kinloch, for blacks or whites. Black children in Kinloch who wished to go to high school had to travel to other parts of the city such as Sumner High School (if they could afford the tuition) or Douglass High School (if they could somehow prove residency in far off Webster Groves). White students traveled to Normandy High School, Ritenour High School, or Ferguson High School. The black population was outpacing that of the whites, so in 1936, the Dunbar elementary school began hosting a high school program for local black students. The Kinloch school board also received approval from the Works Progress Administration for the construction of a new high school, which turned into plans for two "separate but equal' school buildings, one for blacks and one for whites. The decision was controversial, as many white families were opposed to the idea of a black high school, and there was pressure to split the school district into two. Three attempts to split were struck down, after which some white citizens countered by forming a separate city, Berkeley, Missouri, which had its boundaries carefully drawn so as to only include white families. The new city had its own school district, the Berkeley School District. The "white" Kinloch high school was renamed as Berkeley High School, and the "black" school was opened in 1938 as Kinloch High School, with its own board of education formed by the black residents. Kinloch became the second high school for black students in St. Louis County.

In 1954, the U.S. Supreme Court banned school segregation, but the residents of Kinloch and Berkeley ignored the ruling, claiming that the separate but adjoining districts allowed the continued separation. Segregation was maintained until 1971, when the U.S. Justice Department ordered the segregation unlawful. In 1973, when the Kinloch school had approximately 350 students, the Missouri State Board of Education merged the Kinloch and Berkeley into the Ferguson-Florissant school district, creating one large district with approximately 22,000 students. Kinloch's teachers were reassigned to other schools in the district, and the students transferred to McCluer North High School.

The school was eventually demolished, in part to make way for an expansion of the Lambert Airport.

== Principals ==
- Orthel T. Roberts, (1936 - 1937) 1st Principal)
- Lucye Belue, (1944–1974)

== Athletics ==
- 1974, 2A Regional Championship, basketball

== Notable alumni ==
- Jenifer Lewis, actress/singer
- Juanita Head Walton, Representative, Missouri House District 91
