= Jamilah Nasheed =

American politician

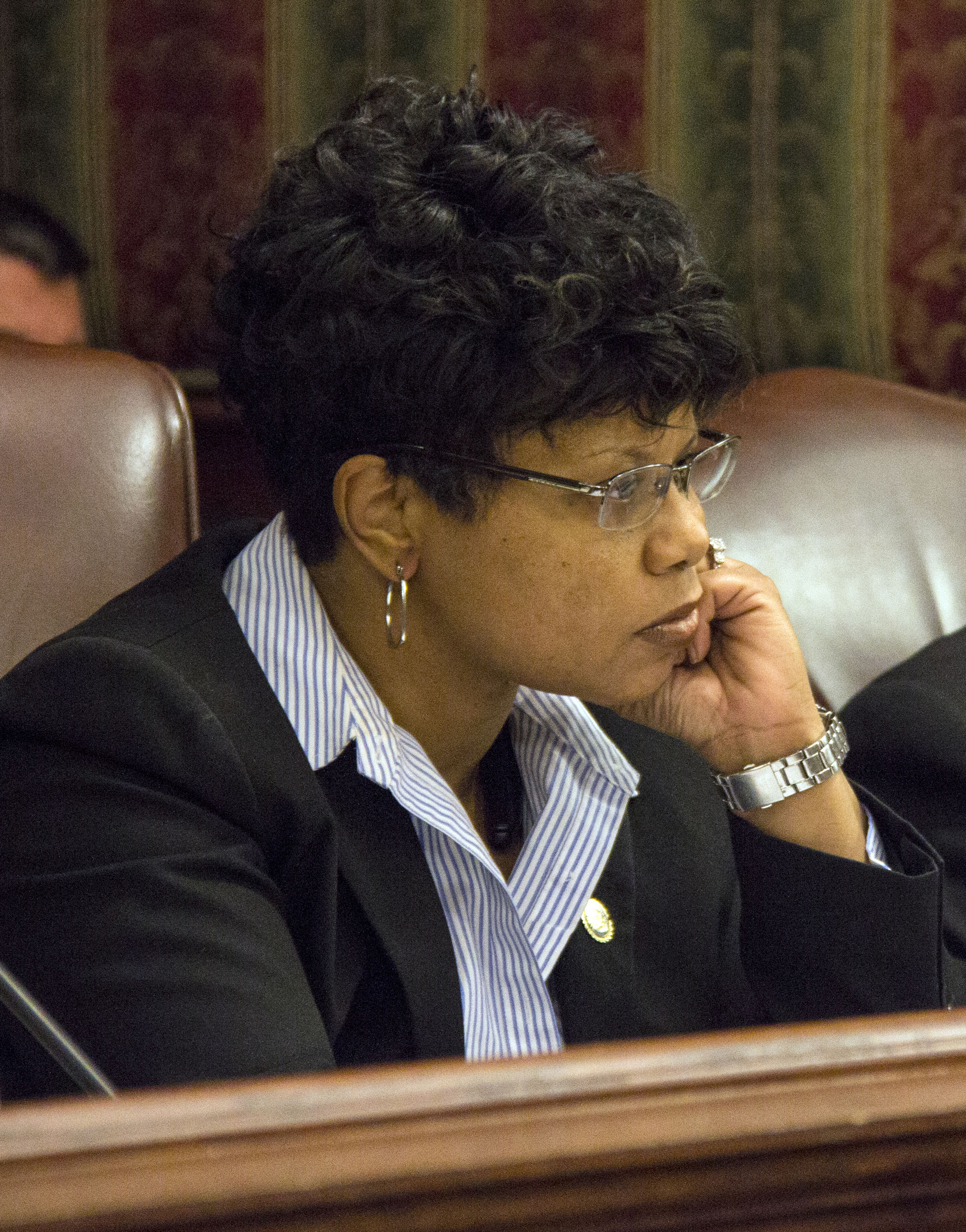

Member of the Missouri Senate from the 5th district
- In office January 2013 – January 2021
- Preceded by: Robin Wright-Jones
- Succeeded by: Steve Roberts

Member of the Missouri House of Representatives from the 60th district
- In office January 2007 – January 2013

Personal details
- Born: Jenise Williams; October 17, 1972 (age 54) St. Louis, Missouri, U.S.
- Party: Democratic
- Spouse: Fahim Nasheed
- Occupation: Small business owner (Sankofa Books and Gifts), Real Estate Investor

Jamilah Nasheed (born Jenise Williams; October 17, 1972) is an American politician from the state of Missouri. Nasheed formerly represented the fifth district in the Missouri Senate, and formerly served in the Missouri House of Representatives. She is a member of the Democratic Party.

== Early life and education ==
Born Jenise Williams, she was raised with her three brothers by their grandmother in a St. Louis housing project. Her father was killed in a drive-by shooting several months before she was born.

She attended Roosevelt High School in St. Louis. She later took classes at Florissant Valley Community College in 2012. As an adolescent, Nasheed began visiting a mosque on Grand Boulevard. After two years of studying Islam, she converted to the religion.

== Political career ==
Nasheed served as a member of the Missouri House of Representatives from the 60th district from January 2007 until January 2013. She was the first Muslim woman to serve in a state legislature.

Nasheed ran for the Missouri Senate in the 2012 elections. A St. Louis Circuit Court judge ordered she be removed from the ballot because she did not live in the boundaries of the district at the time of the election, although district boundaries were to change through redistricting. She appealed the decision to the Missouri Supreme Court, which allowed her to remain on the ballot. She defeated incumbent Robin Wright-Jones and fellow State Representative Jeanette Mott Oxford in the Democratic primary, and won the general election. In December, she was chosen to chair the Missouri Black Legislative Caucus.

During the Ferguson unrest, Nasheed was taken into police custody on October 20, 2014, in front of the Ferguson, Missouri police station. News reports indicated she was in possession of a firearm and drunk at the time of her arrest. Another protester said Nasheed refused to get off the street even after police gave instructions to the protesters to do so.

In September 2016, Nasheed sat while her colleagues recited the Pledge of Allegiance in the Missouri Capitol. She said she acted in solidarity with San Francisco 49ers quarterback Colin Kaepernick in protest of police brutality and racial oppression, although many of her colleagues saw this as unpatriotic.

Nasheed was a declared candidate for Mayor of St. Louis in the 2017 election, but she dropped out of the race in January 2017. She ran in the March 2019 election to be the president of the St. Louis Board of Aldermen.

== Personal life ==
On November 22, 2014, Nasheed was the victim of a carjacking attempt.
