= Douglass High School (Webster Groves, Missouri) =

Coordinates: 38.601593°N 90.356126°W

- Holland Avenue, North Webster Groves; United States

Information
- Type: Segregated Public Secondary
- Established: 1926
- Closed: 1956
- School district: Webster Groves
- Principal: Howell B. Goins (1929–1956)
- Grades: 9–12

Douglass High School was a segregated high school in North Webster Groves, Missouri from 1926 until 1956. Named after abolitionist Frederick Douglass, the school served the area of North Webster, which had been settled by many black families after the Civil War.

The school was formed when the Webster Groves School District decided to stop paying tuition for students to attend the all-black Sumner High School, founded in 1875, which was miles away in St. Louis. So an elementary school, Douglass Elementary, dating from 1866, was expanded into a high school in the 1920s. Douglass High School was the only accredited public high school for African-American students in St. Louis County until the end of segregation in 1957.

== History ==
Before the Civil War (1861–1865), black children in Missouri were not allowed an education. Following the Civil War, many black families had settled in Webster Groves, and in 1866, classes for black children were held in the First Baptist Church on Shady Avenue, taught by a white teacher, Mrs. Dotwell. The School District of Webster Groves took over this responsibility in 1868, a time when there were 30 black children in the area. In 1871, the school had its first black teacher, T. A. Bush, who had 23 students in his class. In 1872, the school moved to a rented structure, until it burned down, after which the school moved back to the church until 1892, when a new elementary school was built. This school, the first public school in Webster Groves, was named after abolitionist Frederick Douglass. In 1898, three students graduated the 8th grade. For further education, tuition needed to be paid for the students to attend the nearest high school for black students, Sumner High School in St. Louis City. Seventy-five percent of the tuition for Webster students was paid by the school district, and the families covered the remaining twenty-five percent. This arrangement was affirmed in 1918, when the Missouri Supreme Court ruled that education should be "separate but equal". In the 1920s, the School Board decided that the more cost-effective choice was just to found a new school, thus in 1925 Douglass Elementary School was expanded to include ninth grade, and over the next few years, additional grades were added until the school had a complete four-year high-school program. In 1929, the first graduating class consisted of eight students.

Black students from all over St. Louis commuted to the school, which was the only accredited high school for blacks in St. Louis County. Another school, Kinloch High School (opened in 1938), had classes for black students but was not accredited.

Library access was an issue, as the black students of Douglass High School were only allowed to use the Webster Groves Public Library one afternoon a week; to the city's credit, some public libraries would not allow any black patrons. Eventually a second library was established in the 1930s in North Webster, accessible to the black families there.

In 1947, Douglass Elementary School moved to its own separate building, and the entire original school facility was then used for the Douglass High School. In 1954, after the U.S. Supreme Court ruling in Brown v. Board of Education, all high schools were integrated. In 1956, Douglass High School was closed, and the old high school building demolished. The Douglass High School building was renovated in 1983 into an apartment building for the elderly at 546 North Elm Avenue.

== Principals ==
- Herbert Davis, late 1920s
- Howell B. Goins, 1929–1956

== Notable alumni ==
- Walter Ambrose (class of 1937), aide to General George Patton, and first black member of the school board
- John Horner, illustrator for The Saturday Evening Post
- Alphonse Smith, professional baseball player
- Joe Thomas, trumpeter for the Duke Ellington Band
