= 1952 NCAA gymnastics championships =

American college gymnastics competition

Tournament information
- Sport: Collegiate gymnastics
- Location: Boulder, Colorado
- Host(s): University of Colorado Boulder
- Venue(s): Balch Fieldhouse
- Participants: 17 teams

Final positions
- Champions: Florida State (2nd title)
- 1st runners-up: USC
- 2nd runners-up: Illinois

Tournament statistics
- All-Around Champion(s): Jack Beckner, USC

The 1952 NCAA gymnastics championships were contested at the 10th annual NCAA-sanctioned gymnastics meet to determine the team and individual national champions of men's collegiate gymnastics among its member programs in the United States.

These championships were contested at Balch Fieldhouse at the University of Colorado Boulder in Boulder, Colorado.

Accumulating the most points across the individual events, defending champions Florida State again won the team national championship, the Seminoles' second.

The individual all-around championship was won by Jack Beckner from USC.

== Team results ==
- (H) = Hosts
- (DC) = Defending champions
- Italics = Debut appearance

Rank	Team	Points
1st place, gold medalist(s)	Florida State (DC)	89.5
2nd place, silver medalist(s)	USC	75
3rd place, bronze medalist(s)	Illinois	60.5
4	Army	57.5
5	Minnesota	29
6	Michigan State	26
7	Iowa	20.5
8	Navy	14.5
9	Penn State	14
10	Michigan	13.5
10	UCLA	13.5
12	Syracuse	9
13	Georgia	8
14	California	6.5
15	Colorado (H)	6
16	Indiana	3
17	Ohio State	2

== See also ==
- Pre-NCAA Gymnastics Champions
