= Juanita Head Walton =

Missouri state representative

Member of the Missouri House of Representatives
- In office 2000–2008

Personal details
- Born: May 19, 1954
- Died: April 12, 2016 (aged 61)
- Party: Democratic
- Spouse: Elbert Walton (div.)
- Children: Rochelle Walton Gray (step); Angela Walton Mosley (step)
- Education: Kinloch High School
- Alma mater: Lincoln University; Lindenwood University; Washington University in St. Louis

Juanita Head Walton (May 19, 1954 – April 12, 2016) was a real estate agent, flight attendant, instructor at colleges, and director of a business organization who served as a state representative in Missouri. She graduated from Kinloch High School, Lincoln University, and Lindenwood University, She also earned a master's degree from Washington University in St. Louis. She married Elbert Walton, an attorney, and later divorced. Willie Head, who served as an alderman and the first mayor of Kinloch, Missouri, was her grandfather.

A Democrat, she represented District 69, which included the City of Jennings, City of Moline Acres, Castle Point, Hathaway Manors North and South as well as some unincorporated areas of North St. Louis, in the Missouri House of Representatives. She was first elected in 2000 and served eight years in the House. In the 2008 election cycle, Walton was elected to the Ferguson Township Committee.
