= Tommie Pierson Sr. =

American politician

Tommie Pierson

Mayor of Bellefontaine Neighbors
- Incumbent
- Assumed office 2019

Member of the Missouri House of Representatives from the 66th district
- In office January 9, 2011 – January 4, 2017
- Preceded by: Michael Vogt
- Succeeded by: Tommie Pierson Jr.

Personal details
- Born: January 29, 1946 (age 80) Ripley, Tennessee
- Party: Democratic Party
- Spouse: JoAnn
- Children: three
- Profession: assembly worker, pastor

Tommie Pierson Sr. (born January 29, 1946) is an American politician from the state of Missouri. A member of the Democratic Party, Pierson represented the 66th district in the Missouri House of Representatives from 2011 until 2017.

== Education and career ==
Pierson graduated from Beaumont High School in St. Louis, Missouri. He worked for General Motors and serves as a Baptist pastor. Pierson was elected to the Missouri House in the 2010 elections, and chaired the Missouri Legislative Black Caucus. He ran for Lieutenant Governor of Missouri in the 2016 election, but lost in the Democratic Party primary election to Russ Carnahan.

== Legacy ==
Pierson was succeeded by his son, Tommie Pierson Jr.
