= Kimberly-Ann Collins =

American politician (born 1993)

Member of the Missouri House of Representatives from the 77th district
- Incumbent
- Assumed office January 6, 2021
- Preceded by: Steve Roberts

Personal details
- Born: 1993 (age 32–33) St. Louis, Missouri, U.S.
- Party: Democratic
- Education: University of Missouri–Kansas City (BS)

Kimberly-Ann Collins (born 1993) is an American politician serving as a member of the Missouri House of Representatives from the 77th district. Elected in November 2020, she assumed office on January 6, 2021.

== Early life and education ==
Collins was born and raised in St. Louis. Her mother is Dr. LaTonia Collins-Smith, President of Harris-Stowe State College. Her older brother is John Collins-Muhammad, a former Saint Louis Alderman; the youngest elected in the city's history. She earned a Bachelor of Science degree in public health science, with a minor in chemistry, from the University of Missouri–Kansas City.

== Career ==
Prior to entering politics, Collins worked for PotBangerz, a non-profit community justice organization, RedBike, and City Hope STL. She was elected to the Missouri House of Representatives in November 2020 and assumed office on January 6, 2021.

== Electoral history ==
2020 Missouri's 77th House District election
Primary election
Party	Candidate	Votes	%
Democratic	Kimberly-Ann Collins	4,374	61.0
Democratic	Darryl Gray	2,798	39.0
General election
Democratic	Kimberly-Ann Collins	12,537	100.0

Missouri House of Representatives Election, November 8, 2022, District 77
Party	Candidate	Votes	%	±%
Democratic	Kimberly-Ann Collins	9,218	100.00%	0.00
