= Aerials water ramps =

Water ramp training for snow ski

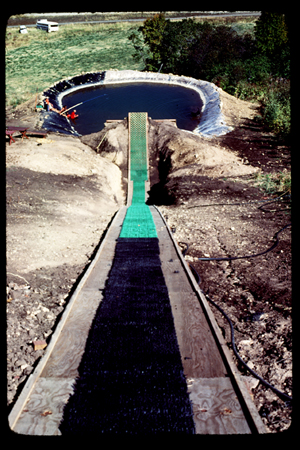
View from the top of a training ramp

Water ramps into oversized pools, ponds, or lakes are constructed as training locations for aerial skiing, mogul skiing, and snowboarding acrobatics events. Such structures typically comprise three sections: in-run, a kicker, and a water surface for landing. They permit the practice of new skills with reduced risk, as the impact of a water landing is less dangerous than a comparable impact on compacted snow.

== History ==
Water ramp training for snow ski aerials became an indispensable professional training tool when Bob Salerno, Frank Bare, Jr., Hans Ribi and Jeff Chumas built a ramp capable of breaking world records in 1978. This first world-class water ramp was built at Nordic Valley ski resort. Bare performed the first recorded double twisting triple back flip and triple twisting triple back flip in 1979 at Nordic Valley, and four years later he was the first to perform a quad flip on snow. As no comparable water ramps existed elsewhere, skiers from all over North America trained at Nordic Valley until an updated structure was completed in Lake Placid, New York in 1987. The state of Utah, in coordination with the US Ski Team, built their water ramp in 1993, in preparation for the 2002 Olympics. Now called the Utah Olympic Park, the facility hosts U.S., Australia and other national ski teams for Freestyles Aerial skiing and Mogul skiing, as well as various snowboarding and Freeskiing athletes. Additional modern water ramps are located at Torreilles France (Frenzy Palace Water Jump), Mettmenstetten (JumpIn), Switzerland, Stity (Acrobat Park), Czech-Republic, Lac-Beauport, Quebec, Canada, and Minsk, Belarus (see for a full list). This last site in Belarus was completed in 2015 and is one of the first indoor water ramp facilities, allowing year-round training and climate control.

== Structures and equipment ==
A water ramp is constructed by covering a structurally stable wood or steel frame with a stiff plastic whose surface is comparable to a hairbrush; skiers and snowboarders slide down this surface, which is denominated an "in-run". Users have nicknamed this section the green or white "meanies" for its ability to leave a "road rash" on anyone who falls on it. The sliding surface is regularly watered down by sprinklers or hoses to allow skis and snowboards to slide with reduced friction and limit dry spots. At the end of the in-run is the "kicker", an upward curve to permit the jumping necessary for the relevant sports. Pools built specifically for water ramps are larger than Olympic size to accommodate the different distances that athletes travel forward of the ramp. Heating is not provided, as aerialists need them only during the warmer months, because actual snow ramps can be used during winter.

Participants typically wear wetsuits, dry suits, gloves, lifejackets, and helmets. The danger of hard landings on water can be reduced by aerating the water surface to create bubbles as large as 12 inches (300 mm), softening landings and lowering injuries. Additionally, these bubbles serve as a reference point for the athletes to help keep them oriented when performing acrobatics. Skis are typically reinforced to lengthen their life, but water impacts will invariably break or delaminate even reinforced skis. Most recently holes or slits have been placed on waterramp aerial skis to further reduce the impact on the athlete's body.

== Dangers ==
As a training tool, the water ramp can be invaluable to preventing injuries on snow, but dangerous in itself. Novices typically fear falling on the in-run, and they are frequently unprepared for the compression that occurs at the end of the in-run and the beginning of the kicker. Awkward landings from high jumps can render skiers unconscious, making the presence of a lifeguard mandatory. Although the pool's bubbles do reduce impacts injuries to arms, legs, and backs can occur. More commonly for jumpers landing long or short in rotation, have their wind knocked out. For advanced athletes traveling faster on the double and triple kickers, the most dangerous part is at the take off. If the skier were to catch an edge on the final few meters of the ski surface they are particularly vulnerable and can hit their backs or heads on the jump creating tremendous impact. Fortunately these events are rare and can be mitigated by proper installation and frequent inspection of the kicker's ski surface.
