= Alan Gray (politician) =

American politician

Member of the Missouri House of Representatives from the 75th district
- In office 2017–2025
- Preceded by: Rochelle Walton Gray
- Succeeded by: Chanel Mosley

Personal details
- Born: St. Louis, Missouri, U.S.
- Party: Democratic
- Spouse: Rochelle Walton Gray
- Children: 2

Military service
- Branch/service: United States Marine Corps

Alan Gray is an American politician who served as a member of the Missouri House of Representatives from 2017 to 2025, representing the 75th district. He was first elected in 2016 and entered office in January 2017.

== Early life and education ==
Gray was born and raised in St. Louis, Missouri. After graduating from Southwest High school, he attended St. Louis Community College.

== Career ==
Gray served in the United States Marine Corps. He later worked for the Missouri Department of Transportation. Gray has since worked as an installation technician for Lucent. Gray is a member of the Communications Workers of America and International Brotherhood of Electrical Workers. He was elected to the Missouri House of Representatives in 2016 and assumed office in 2017. During his tenure, Gray has served as ranking member of the House Special Committee on Homeland Security.

In the 2024 Missouri House of Representatives election, Gray was succeeded by his niece Chanel Mosley.

== Electoral history ==
Missouri House of Representatives Primary Election, August 2, 2016, District 75
Party	Candidate	Votes	%	±%
Democratic	Alan Gray	2,919	63.50%	
Democratic	Teona McGhaw-Boure'	1,678	36.50%	
Total votes		4,597	100.00%	

Missouri House of Representatives Election, November 8, 2016, District 75
Party	Candidate	Votes	%	±%
Democratic	Alan Gray	13,556	100.00%	
Total votes		13,556	100.00%	

Missouri House of Representatives Primary Election, August 7, 2018, District 75
Party	Candidate	Votes	%	±%
Democratic	Alan Gray	4,734	65.20%	+1.70
Democratic	Teona McGhaw-Boure'	2,527	34.80%	−1.70
Total votes		7,261	100.00%	

Missouri House of Representatives Election, November 6, 2018, District 75
Party	Candidate	Votes	%	±%
Democratic	Alan Gray	11,427	100.00%	0.00
Total votes		11,427	100.00%	

Missouri House of Representatives Primary Election, August 4, 2020, District 75
Party	Candidate	Votes	%	±%
Democratic	Alan Gray	3,975	59.42%	−5.78
Democratic	Teona McGhaw-Boure'	2,715	40.58%	+5.78
Total votes		6,690	100.00%	

Missouri House of Representatives Election, November 3, 2020, District 75
Party	Candidate	Votes	%	±%
Democratic	Alan Gray	13,247	100.00%	0.00
Total votes		13,247	100.00%	

Missouri House of Representatives Primary Election, August 2, 2022, District 75
Party	Candidate	Votes	%	±%
Democratic	Alan Gray	2,196	58.00%	−1.72
Democratic	Sylvester Taylor II	1,590	42.00%	n/a
Total votes		3,786	100.00%	

Missouri House of Representatives Election, November 8, 2022, District 75
Party	Candidate	Votes	%	±%
Democratic	Alan Gray	8,295	100.00%	0.00
Total votes		8,295	100.00%	
