= Frank Bare Jr. =

American freestyle skier

Frank Bare Jr. is an American freestyle skier. Bare was one of the sport's innovators and trained using a trampoline as well as on the aerials water ramps. In 1983, at Donner Ski Ranch, California, Bare performed the first quadruple somersault on skis. He did a triple twisting quadrupole back flip and did not wear a helmet. For nearly 20 years, no other skier performed a quadruple somersault onto snow.

Bare's father, Frank Bare Sr., was a notable American gymnastics executive.
