= Rochelle Walton Gray =

American politician

Member of the Missouri House of Representatives from the 75th district
- In office 2009–2017
- Succeeded by: Alan Gray

Personal details
- Party: Democratic
- Spouse: Alan Gray
- Relations: Elbert Walton (father)

Rochelle Walton Gray is an American politician who was member of the Missouri House of Representatives for the 75th district. She was a member of St. Louis County Council.

She is married to fellow legislator Alan Gray. She is the daughter of Elbert Walton and stepdaughter of Juanita Head Walton.
