= Maida Coleman =

American politician

Member of the Missouri Senate from the 5th district
- In office 2002 - 2009

Personal details
- Born: July 1, 1954 (age 72) Sikeston, Missouri
- Party: Democratic
- Spouse: Divorced

Maida Coleman (born July 1, 1954) is a Democratic politician from Missouri. She previously held office in the Missouri House of Representatives and Missouri Senate, where she was the first African American woman to serve as Senate Minority leader. She currently serves on the Missouri Public Service Commission.

== Education ==
Coleman is a graduate of Lincoln University of Missouri with a degree in journalism. Before entering public office, she worked as a clerk for the Missouri Public Service Commission and had management roles in the Missouri Secretary of State office and the St. Louis Housing Authority.

== Political career ==
Coleman was first elected to public office in 2000, when she was elected to the Missouri House of Representatives from the 63rd district. In 2002, Coleman won a special election to the Missouri Senate, representing the 5th district. Coleman represented the 5th district in the Missouri Senate until 2009. She was the first African American woman to serve as Minority Leader in the Missouri Senate, serving from 2004 to 2008.

In the Senate, Coleman sponsored the "hot weather rule" to prevent utility companies from shutting service during extreme temperatures. She also sponsored legislation to protect children from lead poisoning.

While in the Missouri Senate, Coleman served on the following committees:

- Administration
- Agriculture, Conservation, Parks and Natural Resources
- Financial and Governmental Organizations and Elections
- Gubernatorial Appointments
- Ways and Means

In 2008, Coleman announced a run for Mayor of the City of St. Louis against fellow Democratic Francis Slay, but switched to run as an independent after another Democrat candidate with the same last name entered the primary.

Coleman was executive director of the Missouri Workforce Investment Board at the Department of Economic Development. Following the 2014 Ferguson uprising, Jay Nixon formed the Office of Community Engagement and appointed Coleman as office director. In 2015, Nixon appointed Coleman to the Missouri Public Service Commission.

== Personal life ==
Coleman was born in Sikeston, Missouri. She has three children and currently resides in St. Louis, Missouri.
