= P. Wayne Goode =

American politician (1937–2020)

Member of the Missouri Senate from the 13th district
- In office January 9, 1985 – January 5, 2005
- Preceded by: Harriett Woods
- Succeeded by: Timothy P. Green

Member of the Missouri House of Representatives from the 33rd district
- In office 1963–1985

Personal details
- Born: August 20, 1937 St. Louis, Missouri
- Died: October 3, 2020 (aged 83) St. Louis, Missouri
- Party: Democratic
- Education: University of Missouri

Peter Wayne Goode Jr. (August 20, 1937 – October 3, 2020) was an American politician in the state of Missouri. He was born in St. Louis. He attended the University of Missouri in Columbia and earned a degree in finance and banking. He was a former officer of the United States Army Reserve. Goode was elected to the Missouri House of Representatives for district 33 in 1962 and was a Democrat. He served until 1984, when he was elected to the Missouri State Senate. He served in the senate until 2005. He died of leukemia on October 3, 2020, in St. Louis at the age of 83.
