= Timothy P. Green =

American politician

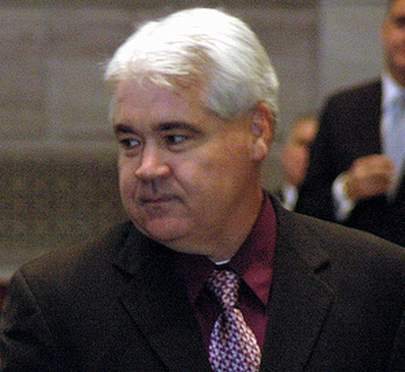

Member of the Missouri Senate from the 13th district
- In office 2005 - 2013

Personal details
- Born: St. Louis, Missouri
- Party: Democratic
- Spouse: Lisa Ann
- Education: University of Missouri-St. Louis

Timothy P. Green (born June 29, 1963) is a Democratic politician from Missouri. He was born in St. Louis, Missouri.

He received a Bachelor of Science degree in business administration from University of Missouri-St. Louis. He has had two children, Patrick Timothy and Megan, with his wife, Lisa Ann.

He was first elected to public office in 1988, when he won election to the Missouri House of Representatives. He was reelected in 1990, 1992, 1994, 1996, 1998, and 2000. He served as the powerful chairman of the Budget Committee from 2000 to 2002. In 2004, he was elected to the Missouri State Senate. He is a member of the following committees:

- Appropriations
- Commerce, Consumer Protection, Energy and the Environment
- Rules, Joint Rules, Resolutions and Ethics
- Small Business, Insurance and Industry
- Joint Committee on Capital Improvements and Leases Oversight
- Joint Committee on Gaming and Wagering
- Joint Committee on Legislative Research
- Joint Committee on Public Employee Retirement
- Joint Committee on Government Accountability
- Missouri State Employees' Retirement System Board
