= Les Trois Vallées =

Ski region in France

Coordinates: 45°21′N 6°36′E

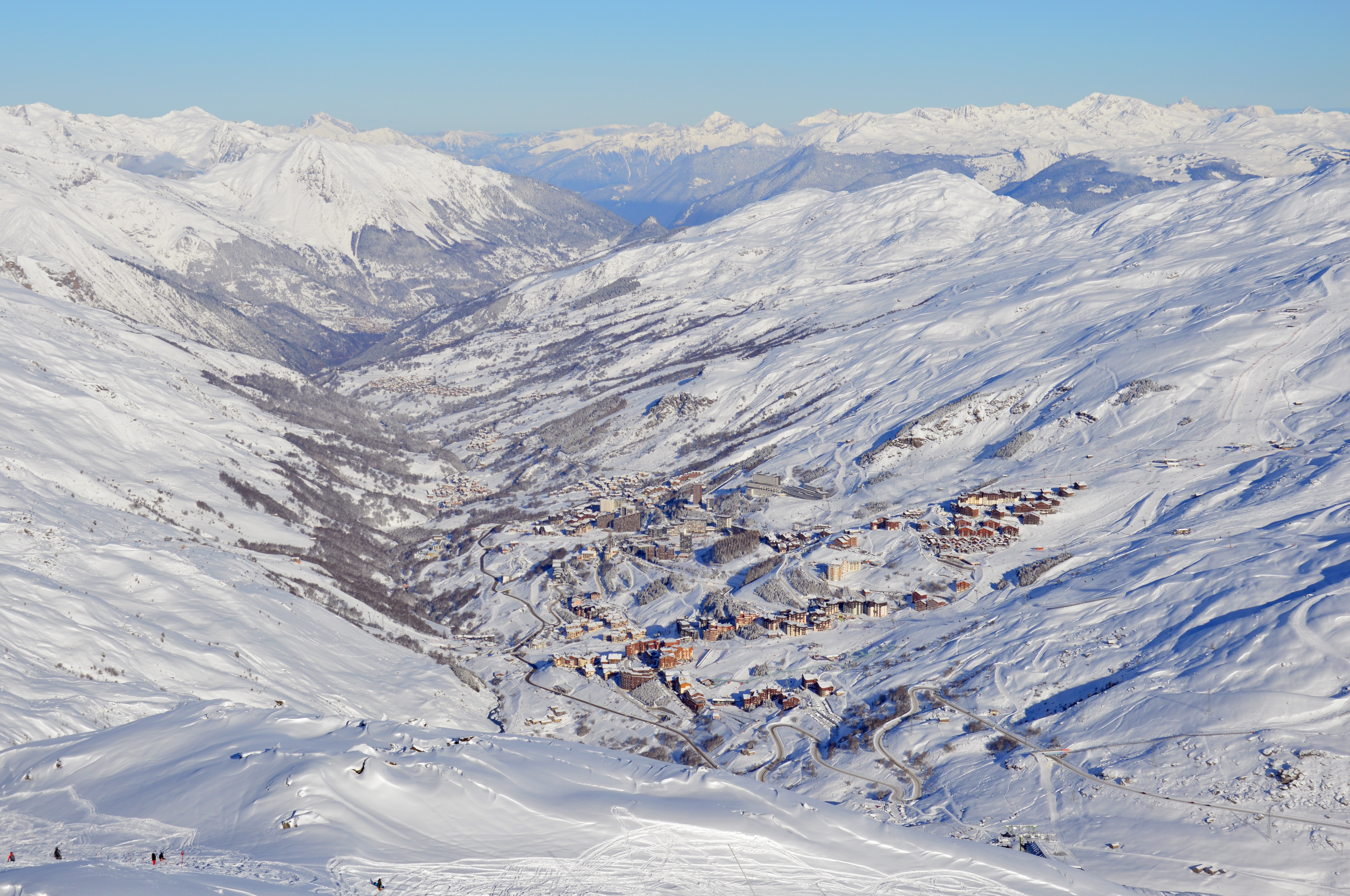
- Overview of Les Menuires in the Belleville valley, one of three valleys

- Location within Alps
- Location: Savoie, France
- Nearest city: Chambéry
- Coordinates: 45.5 N 6.5 E
- Top elevation: 3,230 m (10,600 ft)
- Base elevation: 600 m (2,000 ft)
- Skiable area: 18.5 km^{2} (7.1 sq mi)
- Trails: 335 total; 48 (14%) beginner; 135 (40%) easy; 119 (36%) intermediate; 33 (10%) difficult
- Longest run: 12 km (7.5 mi) Cîme de Caron
- Total length: 600 km (370 mi)
- Lift system: 183 total; 3 cable cars; 37 gondolas; 69 chair lifts; 74 surface lifts
- Snowmaking: 2,300 cannons
- Website: www.les3vallees.com

Les Trois Vallées (French pronunciation: [le tʁwɑ vale]; "The Three Valleys"), and whose official name is “Les 3 Vallées”, is a ski region in the Tarentaise Valley in the Savoie department of Southeastern France, to the south of the town of Moûtiers, partly in Vanoise National Park.

Part of the ski area also extends into the Maurienne Valley, with the resort of Orelle joining Les 3 Vallées in 1996.

Since 1971, it has been possible to ski the interlinked valleys using a single ski pass. Thus, Les Trois Vallées is the largest connected ski area in the world which is linked solely by ski lifts and slopes. It claims to have about 600 km (370 mi) of ski slopes, resulting in 18.5 km² of groomed runs, while an independent expert measured about 493 km. In addition, there are 120 km for cross-country skiing. Les Trois Vallées has 183 ski lifts, which can transport 260,000 skiers per hour. Other equipment owned by the operating companies include 2,300 snow cannons and 73 snow grooming machines operated by 160 snow groomers who work in shifts during the night. Other employees in the area include 424 ski patrollers and 3,000 ski instructors.

As implied by its name, the area originally consisted of three valleys: Saint-Bon, Allues, and Belleville. Since then, the ski area has expanded into a “fourth” valley with the addition of the resort of Orelle in 1996, located in the Maurienne valley. It is adjacent to Val Thorens, but can also be accessed using a long gondola lift from Orelle. The following ski resorts are in Les Trois Vallées:

Valley	Resort	Established	Skiable range (m)	Sub-resorts
Saint-Bon	Courchevel	1946	1300 - 2738	Courchevel-Le Praz, Courchevel-Village (1550), Courchevel-Moriond (1650), Courchevel 1850 Courchevel - La Tania (1400)
Saint-Bon	Courchevel - La Tania	1990	1400–2305	-
Allues	Méribel	1939	1400–2952	Les Allues, Meribel-Village, Meribel, Meribel-Mottaret
Allues	Brides-les-Bains	1992	600–1450	-
Belleville	Val Thorens	1972	1825–3200	-
Belleville	Les Menuires	1964	1850–2850	Les Menuires, Reberty, La Masse
Belleville	Saint-Martin-de-Belleville	1983	1400–2434	-
Maurienne	Orelle	1997	900–3230	-

== Geography ==
=== Location ===
The Les 3 Vallées ski area stretches across the Tarentaise Valley, on the northern slopes of the Vanoise Massif. It brings together three iconic areas: Courchevel in the Saint-Bon valley; Méribel and Méribel-Mottaret in the Allues valley; and Les Menuires and Val Thorens in the Belleville valley.

These valleys are structured around several mountain rivers, the Doron de Bozel, Doron des Allues and Doron de Belleville, forming a coherent landscape linked by passes and ridgelines. The resorts are naturally connected via the summits, thanks to an extensive lift network that allows skiers to move seamlessly from one valley to another without taking off their skis.

Shaped by high-altitude peaks and predominantly north-facing slopes, the terrain offers excellent snow conditions alongside generous sunshine. The entire ski area also lies within the membership area of the Vanoise National Park, ensuring an exceptionally well-preserved natural environment.

== Access to the ski area ==
The Les 3 Vallées ski area is easy to reach by road, rail or air. It is also served by two altiports, located in Courchevel and Méribel.

=== Road access ===
From Albertville, the main access route follows the RN90, which extends the A430 motorway, as far as Moûtiers. Exit 41 provides quick and easy access to the resorts of Courchevel, Méribel, Les Menuires, Val Thorens, Brides-les-Bains and the Bozel valley.

From the Maurienne side, Orelle can be reached via the A43 motorway, taking exit 29 at Saint-Michel-de-Maurienne.

=== Rail access ===
Les 3 Vallées are served by the Moûtiers–Salins–Brides-les-Bains railway station, with direct TGV services from Paris in around 5 hours 30 minutes. From there, the resorts can be reached by road in approximately 30 minutes.

Orelle is also accessible by train via the Saint-Michel-de-Maurienne station. A shuttle service connects the station to the gondola lift and is free of charge for TER passengers on presentation of an SNCF ticket.

=== Air access ===
Several international airports are located close to the ski area, including Lyon–Saint-Exupéry, Geneva and Chambéry–Savoie. The Courchevel and Méribel altiports also provide direct access right into the heart of Les 3 Vallées.

== Resorts and accommodation ==
=== Promotion ===
The promotion of the ski area is led by the Les 3 Vallées Association.

Since the 1970s, Les 3 Vallées has been recognised in promotional campaigns as the world’s largest ski area. This positioning has been consistently reinforced over the decades, notably through the signature line “Les Trois Vallées. The world’s largest ski area”, later developed into “the world’s largest fully connected ski area, with 600 km of runs linked entirely by lifts”. With 600 km of pistes spread over 1,500 hectares and served by around 200 ski lifts, this defining promise remains at the heart of the destination’s identity and branding, and is still reflected in its logo today.

While other ski areas, such as Les Portes du Soleil, may claim a greater total length of runs, Les 3 Vallées stands apart for the complete interconnection of its slopes via lift infrastructure, allowing seamless skiing from one valley to the next.

Often referred to as the “skiing Eldorado”, Les 3 Vallées embodies a unique blend of scale, freedom and excellence, reinforcing its international reputation as a benchmark destination for mountain sports.

=== The resorts ===
The Les 3 Vallées ski area spans six municipalities or winter sports resort sites. These include the municipality of Saint-Martin-de-Belleville, with the resorts of Les Menuires, Saint Martin de Belleville and Val Thorens; the municipality of Saint-Bon-Tarentaise, home to Courchevel, which encompasses the village resorts of Le Praz (Courchevel 1300), Courchevel 1550, Moriond (Courchevel 1650) and Courchevel 1850, as well as La Tania; and the municipality of Allues-Méribel, with Méribel Village, Méribel-les-Allues and Méribel-Mottaret. Two additional resorts were later integrated into this vast ski area through the construction of gondola lift connections.

In preparation for the Albertville Olympic Games in 1992, the spa resort of Brides-les-Bains built the Olympe gondola, linking it to the Les 3 Vallées ski area via Méribel. This development enabled Brides-les-Bains to become a fully fledged winter sports resort.

In 1995, with the opening of the 3 Vallées Express gondola, measuring 5,122 metres in length, the municipality of Orelle, located in the Maurienne Valley, was connected to the ski area.

=== Tourist accommodation ===
The seven resorts together offer a total capacity of around 140,000 tourist beds in 2026, representing the highest concentration of accommodation within any French ski area.

== The ski area and its management ==
=== The ski area and its facilities ===
Les 3 Vallées is a ski area recognised as one of the largest in the world, as highlighted in the “Promotion” section. It boasts 600 km of downhill ski runs and a Nordic skiing area covering 81.5 km.

Skiers can explore the area via 334 alpine ski runs, offering an exceptional diversity of terrain and experiences.

By 2026, the ski area is equipped with 2,823 snowmaking machines, ensuring consistent snow coverage and compensating for natural variations in snowfall, compared with around 600 units in the 1990s.

While lift infrastructure in the 1990s allowed the transport of around 180,000 skiers per hour, total uplift capacity in 2026 is estimated at approximately 284,500 skiers per hour, reflecting ongoing investment in performance, comfort and efficiency.

=== Ski area operating companies ===
Les 3 Vallées ski area is operated by several independent companies responsible for piste maintenance and lift operations:

- Courchevel and Méribel-Mottaret: These areas are managed by the Société des Trois Vallées (S3V), founded in 1946. Originally a semi-public company linked to the Savoie departmental authority, it has operated as a commercial company with majority public ownership since 2000. S3V oversees both the ski slopes and lift infrastructure. La Tania is the newest resort in Les 3 Vallées, having been developed for the Albertville Winter Olympics in 1992.
- Méribel and Brides-les-Bains: Operations are handled by Méribel Alpina, a company founded on 19 February 1955 to manage ski slopes and lifts. From 1994, it was partly owned by Compagnie des Alpes, which became its sole shareholder in December 2000. Méribel Alpina was publicly listed from 1995 until it was fully acquired and delisted.
- Les Menuires and Saint-Martin-de-Belleville: Lift operations are managed by the Société d’Exploitation de la Vallée des Belleville (Sevabel), a subsidiary of Compagnie des Alpes since 1989–1990. Piste services across the Belleville valley resorts (Saint-Martin-de-Belleville, Les Menuires and Val Thorens) are managed directly by the municipality of Saint-Martin-de-Belleville.
- Val Thorens: The Société d’Exploitation des Téléphériques Tarentaise-Maurienne (STAM, later SETAM), founded in 1972 as a semi-public company, operates the lift system. It fully funds the municipal piste service and partially finances the Tourist Office. SETAM is a subsidiary of Savoie Stations Participation, a semi-public company created by the Savoie departmental authority in 1995.
- Orelle: Lift operations are managed by the Société des Téléphériques d’Orelle (STOR), founded in October 1995. It is a subsidiary of the Société d’Exploitation des Téléphériques Tarentaise-Maurienne.

=== Lift pass prices ===
Prices for the lift pass known as the “3 Vallées Solo 1 Adult” pass vary from year to year. Valid between mid-December and mid-April, and sometimes until early May in Val Thorens and Orelle, these prices have increased steadily over time.

Lift pass prices (in euros)
	6-day adult pass
2010-2011	235
2011-2012	245
2012-2013	260
2013-2014	277
2014-2015	283
2015-2016	289
2016-2017	294
2017-2018	300
2018-2019	306
2019-2020	312
2020-2021	321
2021-2022	330
2022-2023	360
2023-2024	375
2024-2025	395
2025-2026	409

- 2013: Introduction of the “Tribu Pass”, offering a preferential rate for groups of three or more skiers.
- 1 January 2014: VAT increased from 5.5% to 10% over a two-year period.

== Tarentaise Valley Skiing ==
Within the Tarentaise Valley, there are various other resorts such as Paradiski (Les Arcs, La Plagne) and Espace Killy (Val d'Isère and Tignes). A weekly lift ticket in Les Trois Vallées used to allow one to ski one day in each of the other two systems mentioned although this has now been removed. There were once plans to interlink all systems and resorts to create the – by far – largest ski area in the world. However that vision was ended with the creation of the Vanoise National Park.

== See also ==
- List of ski areas and resorts in Europe
- French Alps
