= Le Thyl =

Le Thyl Lo Tëzh (Savoyard)
- Associated commune of Saint-Michel-de-Maurienne
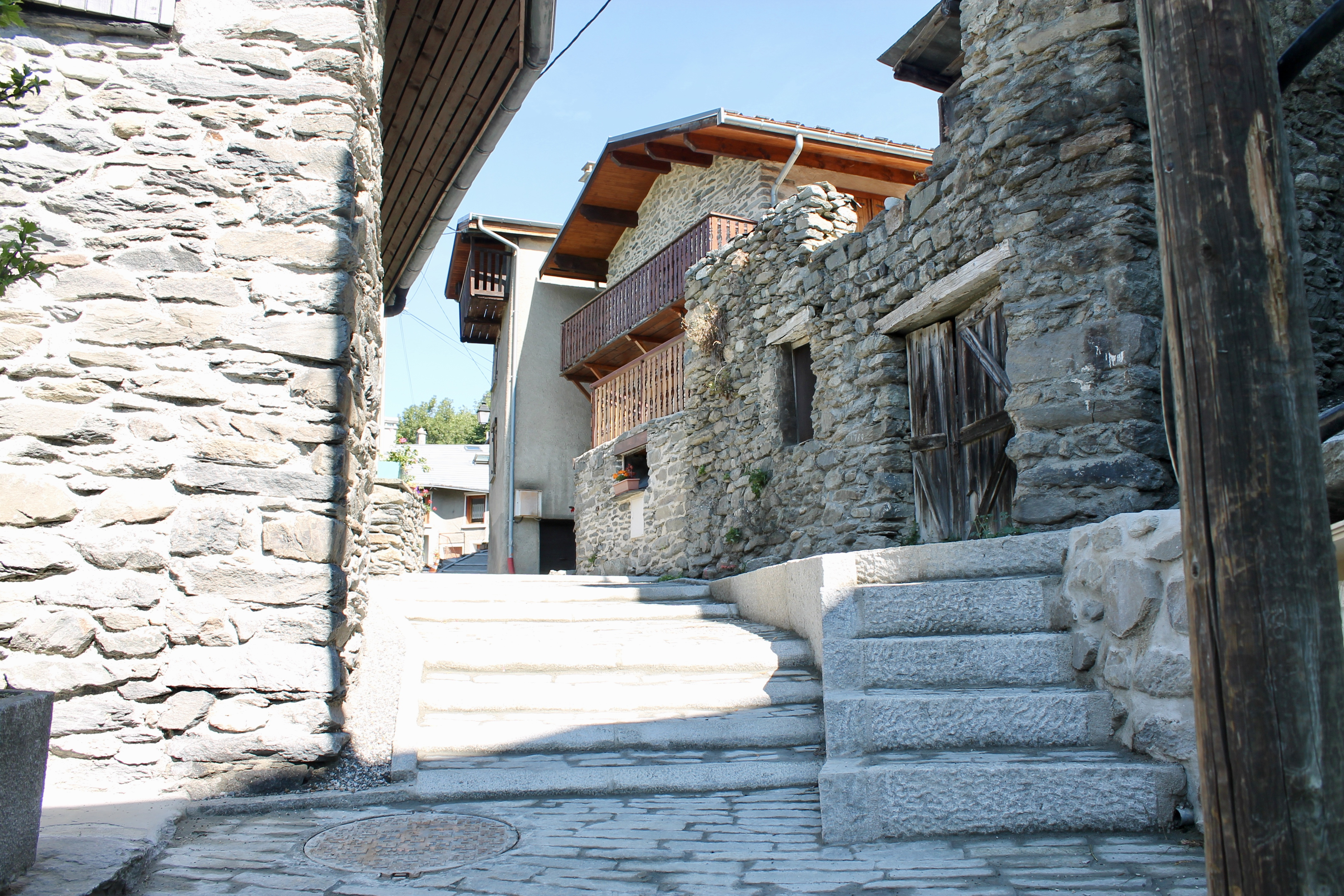
- Street in Le Thyl
- Location of Le Thyl
- Location within France Location within Auvergne-Rhône-Alpes
- Coordinates: 45.22446°N 6.49142°E
- Country: France
- Region: Auvergne-Rhône-Alpes
- Department: Savoie
- Arrondissement: Saint-Jean-de-Maurienne
- Canton: Modane
- Intercommunality: Maurienne-Galibier
- Commune: Saint-Michel-de-Maurienne
- Elevation: 1,350 m (4,430 ft)
- Population (2023): 36
- Demonym: Les Thyllerains
- Time zone: UTC+01:00 (CET)
  - Summer (DST): UTC+02:00 (CEST)
- Postal code: 73140

Le Thyl (official name: Thyl, Savoyard: Lo Tëzh) is a former commune in the Maurienne valley, in the Savoie department of southeastern France. It was attached to the commune of Saint-Michel-de-Maurienne on 13 September 1972 and has since had the status of an associated commune.

== Geography ==
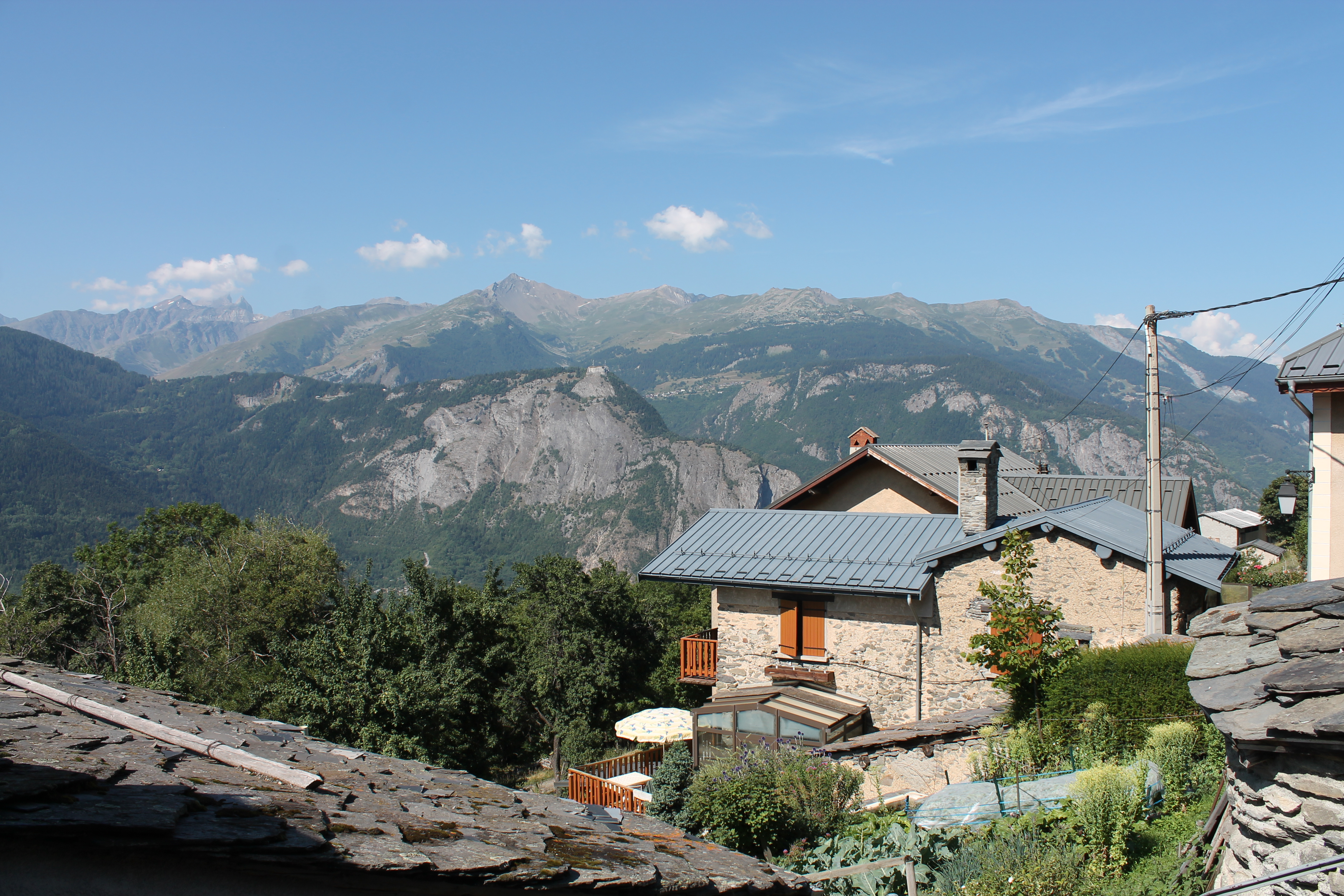
View of the Maurienne valley

Le Thyl is located on the right bank of the Arc, on the southern slope of Mont Bréquin, above Saint-Michel-de-Maurienne and west of Orelle.

The former commune consisted of the villages of Le Thyl, sometimes called Thyl-Dessus, the chief village at an altitude of about 1,350 m, as well as Thyl-Dessous and La Traversaz. The two other villages, Bois-Dessus and Bois-Dessous, were destroyed during the Second World War.

== Toponomy ==
According to Adolphe Gros, early forms of the name include Ecclesia de Tilio in the 12th century, de Tillio in 1200, Parrochia Tillie in 1416, Parrochia Tillii in 1460, and Curatus de Tillia in the 14th century.

The place name appears to derive from Tilia, meaning lime tree or linden tree, probably referring to a place where such trees grew. The Swiss Romance philologist Paul Aebischer instead connected tey with the local patois word tê, meaning “roof”, from Latin tectum.

== History ==
The earliest mention of Le Thyl concerns its church, Ecclesia de Tilio, dated to the 12th century in the Cartulaire de Maurienne. The document, which is undated, records that the prior of Saint-Michel-de-la-Cluse in the Susa Valley gave the church of Le Thyl to the canons of Saint-Jean-de-Maurienne in exchange for the church of Saint-Sulpice at Saint-Rémy-de-Maurienne.

The first known mention of the villages of Le Bois dates from 1475, in a land register of Orelle, under the Latin forms In Boscho superiore and In Bosco Inferiore / In comba Nemoris inferioris.

On 5 September 1944, the villages of Bois-Dessus and Bois-Dessous were burned by the Wehrmacht searching for members of the Maquis. The attack caused 15 deaths. A memorial was inaugurated in 2004.

The communes of Le Thyl and Beaune were attached to Saint-Michel-de-Maurienne by prefectural decree on 13 September 1972.

== Demographics ==
Historical population

Year	Pop.	±% p.a.
1793	465	—
1800	539	+2.13%
1806	582	+1.29%
1821	504	−0.95%
1838	552	+0.54%
1848	572	+0.36%
1858	534	−0.69%
1861	524	−0.63%
1866	546	+0.83%
1872	536	−0.31%
1876	564	+1.28%
1881	500	−2.38%
1886	506	+0.24%
1891	508	+0.08%
1896	525	+0.66%

Year	Pop.	±% p.a.
1901	561	+1.34%
1906	561	+0.00%
1911	534	−0.98%
1921	436	−2.01%
1926	344	−4.63%
1931	321	−1.37%
1936	311	−0.63%
1946	265	−1.59%
1954	235	−1.49%
1962	193	−2.43%
1968	150	−4.11%
2006	46	−3.06%
2017	35	−2.45%
2023	36	+0.47%

Source: EHESS and INSEE (2006-2023)

== Local culture and heritage ==
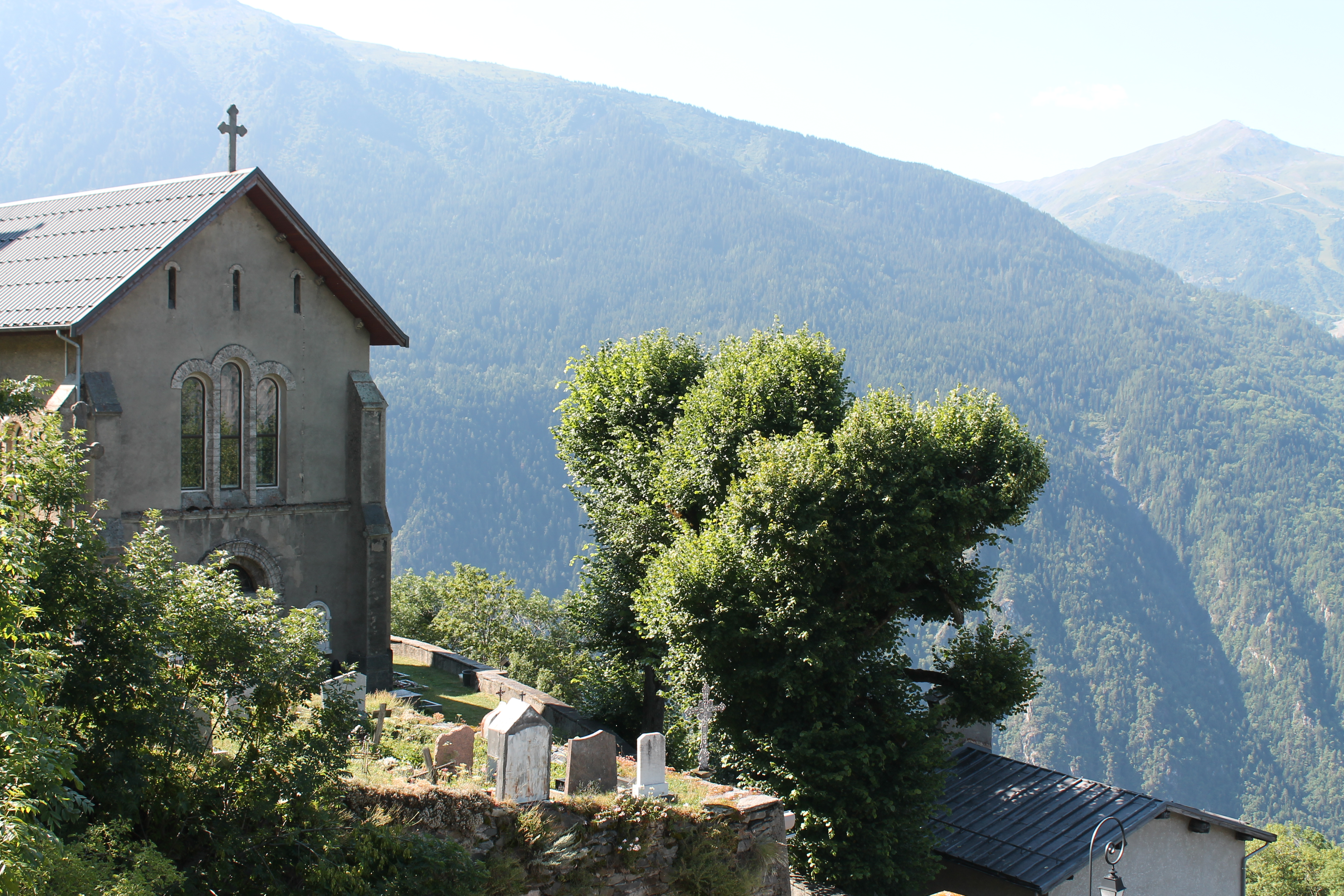
Church of Saint Lawrence.

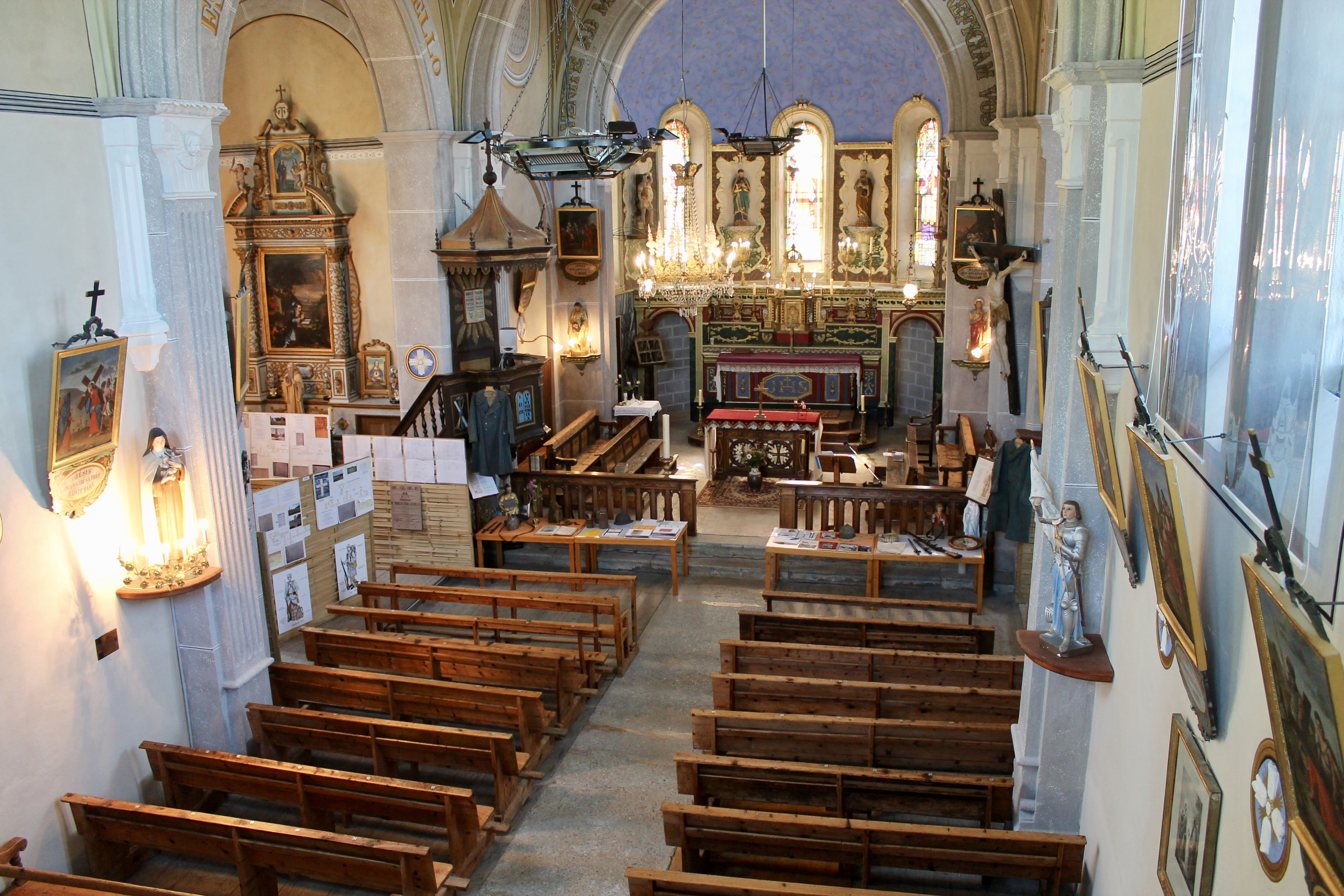
Interior of the Church of Saint Lawrence.

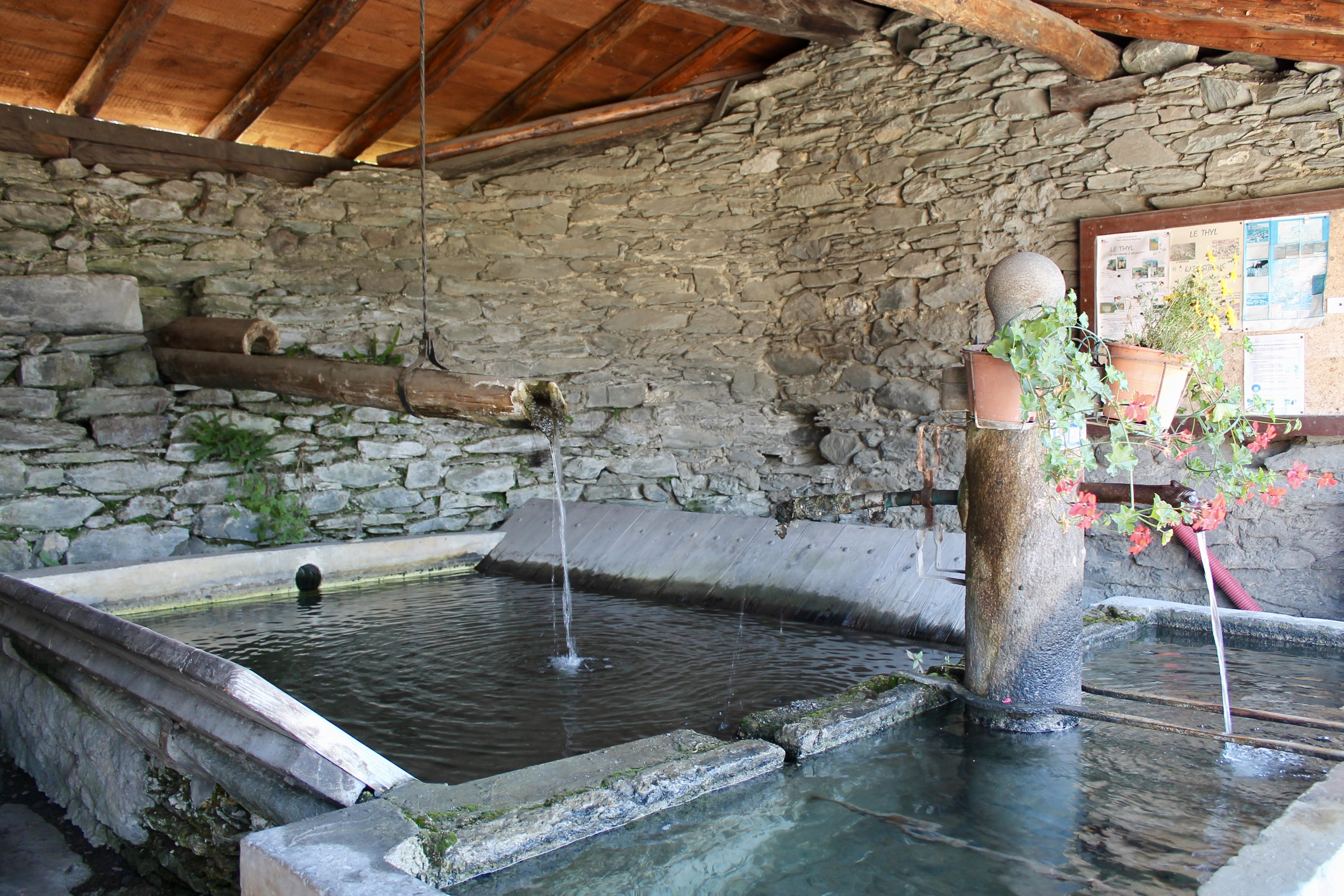
Basin

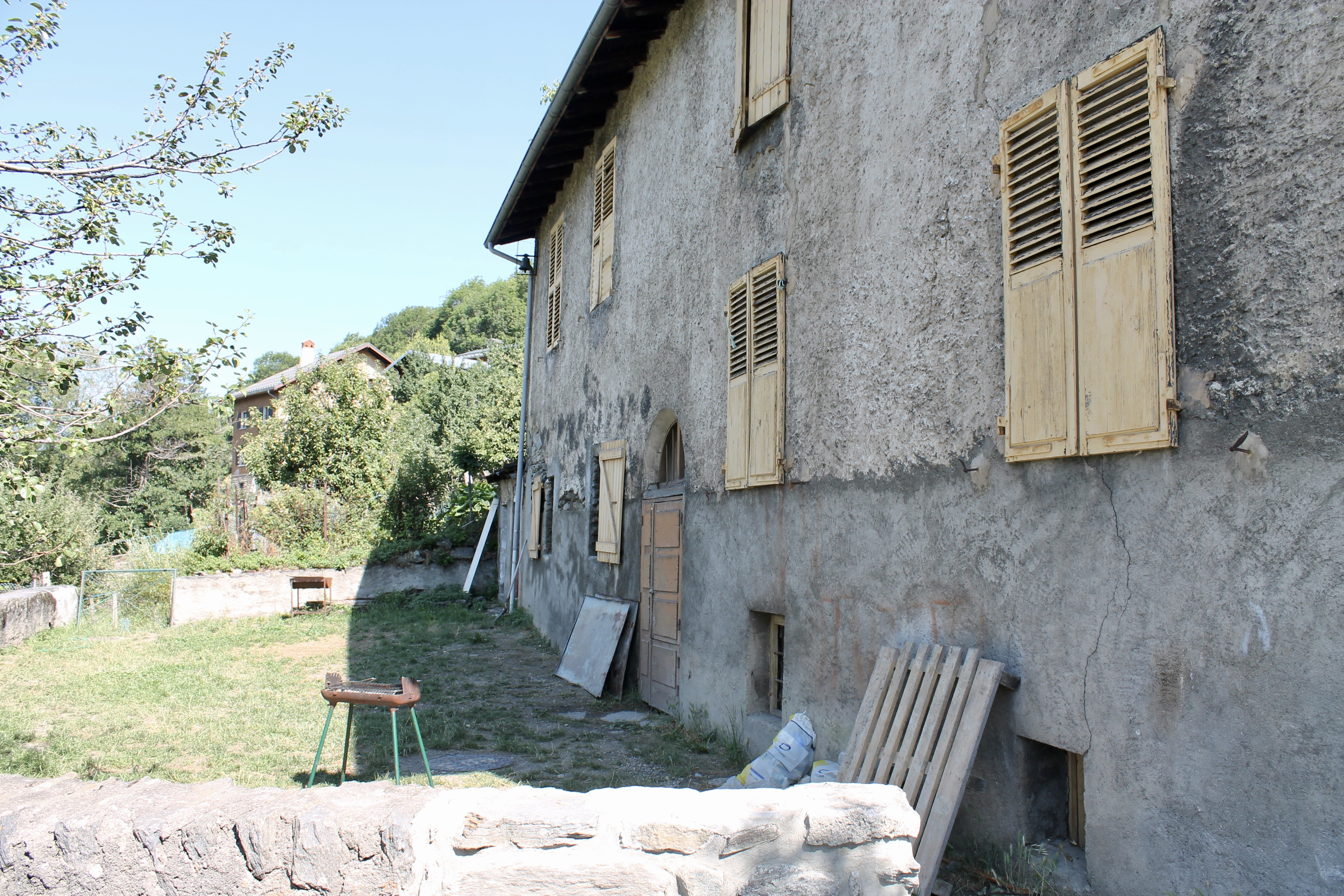
Former school.

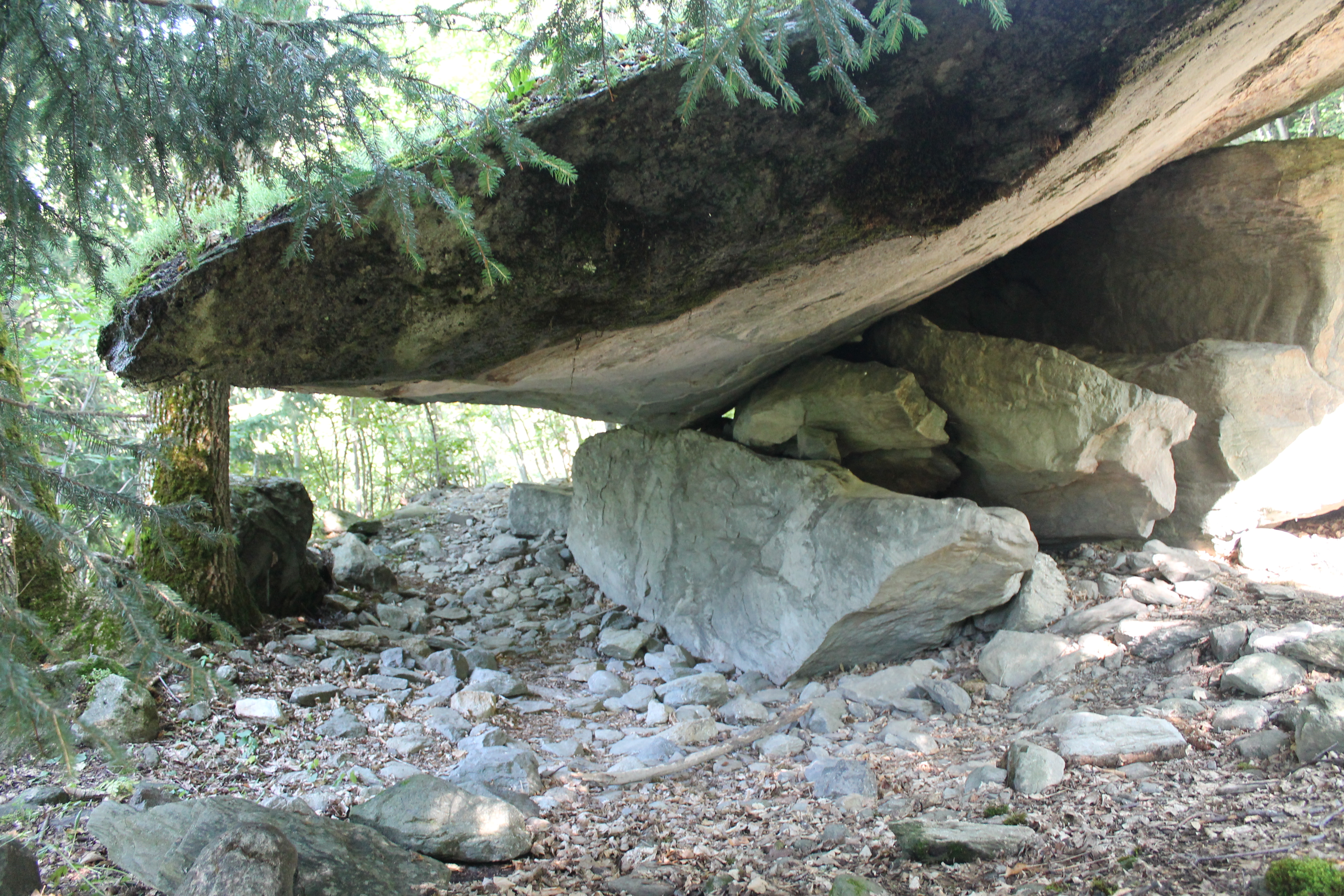
Dolmen.

=== Megalithic heritage ===
An archaeological trail has been created on the territory of the former commune. It includes a significant megalithic heritage, including an engraved rock at Thyl-Dessous and cup-marked stones above the chief village. The so-called dolmen near the chief village is actually a collapsed rockfall block, and its human occupation has not been established.

=== Church and chapels ===
The Church of Saint Lawrence is a former parish church dedicated to Saint Lawrence. It was consecrated on 11 August 1867. The Association for the Protection of the Heritage of Le Thyl undertook its restoration, which was completed in 2017 after about ten years of work.

Each village had a chapel, and most of their objects have been stored in the church. These include:

- the Chapel of Saint Gregory, attested since 1592, rebuilt in 1822, decorated in 1870 and restored in 2005, at Thyl-Dessous;
- the Chapel of Saint George, dating from the 17th century and restored in 2002, at La Traversaz;
- the ruined Chapel of Saint Sebastian at Bois-Dessous.

=== Oratories ===
- the Oratory of Saint Lawrence at Thyl-Dessus.
- the Oratory of Saint Mark at La Traversaz.
- the Oratory of Our Lady at Thyl-Dessous.
