= Méribel =

Ski resort in France

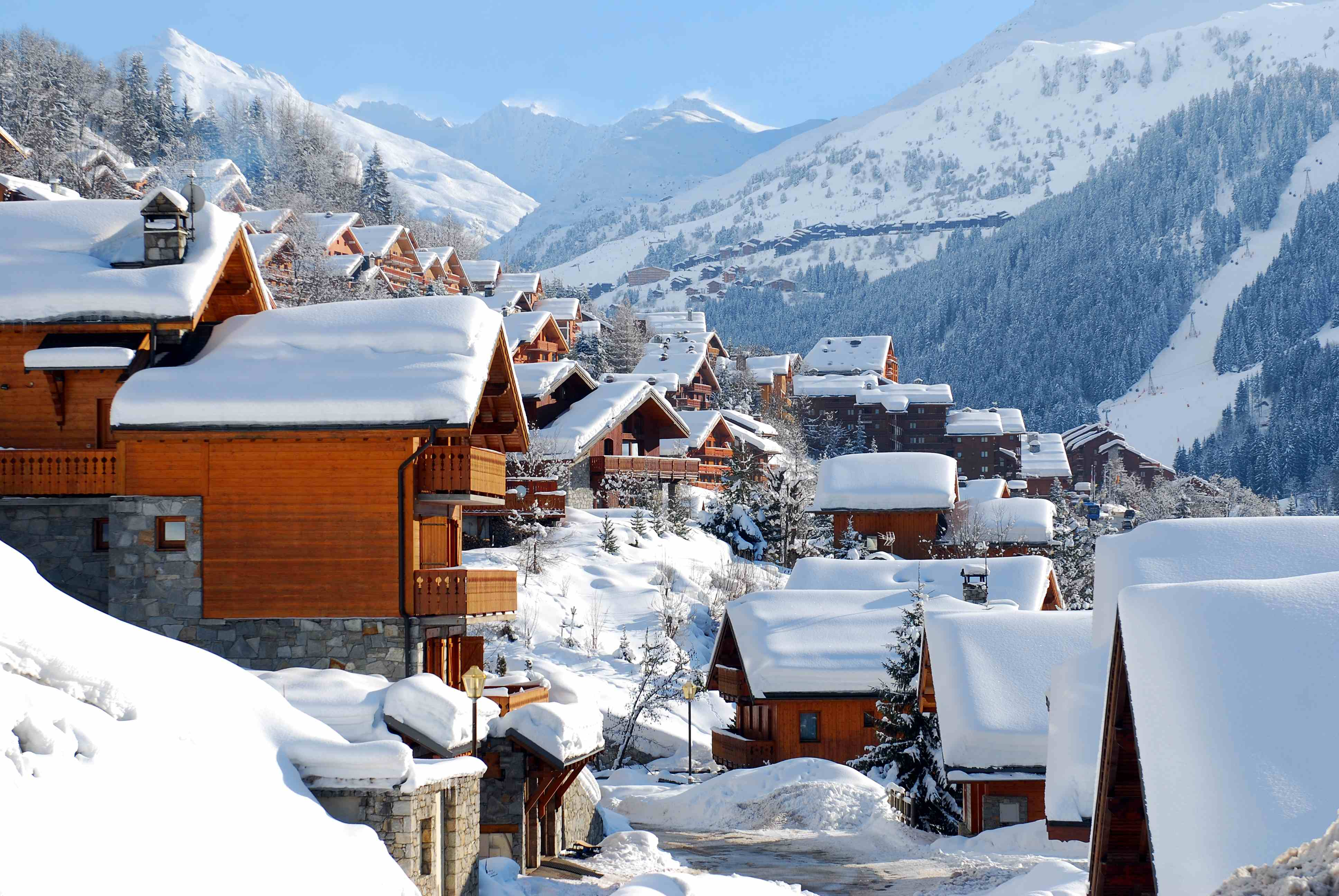
- Méribel in January 2014

- Location in the Alps
- Location: Les Allues, Savoie, France
- Nearest city: Chambéry
- Coordinates: 45°23′48.23″N 6°33′58.57″E
- Vertical: 1,502 m (4,928 ft)
- Top elevation: 2,952 m (9,685 ft)
- Base elevation: 1,450 m (4,757 ft)
- Trails: 76 (8 green, 36 blue, 23 red & 9 black)
- Lift system: 53
- Lift capacity: 75,565/h
- Website: www.meribel.net

Méribel (French pronunciation: [meʁibɛl]) is a ski resort in the Tarentaise Valley in the French Alps. Méribel refers to three neighbouring villages in the Les Allues commune of the Savoie department of France, near the town of Moûtiers (45.401°N 6.5655°E), called Méribel Centre, Méribel-Mottaret and Méribel Village. The villages are within Vanoise National Park and a part of the Les Trois Vallées interlinked ski system.

Méribel Les Allues is a ski resort that was developed adjacent to the traditional hamlet of Morel, with its centre situated at about 1400 metres above sea level. It was founded by a Scotsman, Major Peter Lindsay, who was looking for a new site for winter sports away from the ski resorts of Austria and Germany, because of the growing strength of the Nazi regime. In 1936, he visited the town of Les Allues for the first time. He then imagined how the town could become a ski resort. Firstly, he decided to create a property company in order to develop finances strong enough to build the resort. In 1938, the first lift was placed above Les Allues. A year later, he began the construction of the first chalets and hotels in the hamlet of Méribel. Three years later, the war would stop the development of the resort, but when it was over, development continued. Now a Colonel, Peter Lindsay used specialised architects, Paul Grillo (Grand Prix de Rome in 1937) and his partner Christian Durupt, so that all buildings would be in harmony with the Savoyard style, using wood and stone for the walls, with slanted slate roofs. In 1950, the Burgin-Saulire gondola was built to link the resort to Courchevel. Lindsay's family continue to hold a financial stake in the resort. Lindsay's ashes and those of his wife are scattered on the Burgin mountain.

Méribel was a subsite and hosted some events of the 1992 Winter Olympics hosted by nearby Albertville. The resort host the ice hockey and the women's alpine skiing events. Until 2011, Méribel was the host to the Altitude Festival, with acts such as KT Tunstall, Marcus Brigstocke and Omid Djalili performing in the bars and nightclubs around the resort. For 2011, it has been announced that the festival will be moved to Austria, with the organiser Richard Lett citing a reduction in support from the Méribel Tourist Office. Lett has since joined the Méribel Les Allues council under the new mayor, Bernard Front.

The ski resort is part of the Trois Vallées ski area. The Three Valleys area comprises 180 lifts, 335 marked runs (over 600 kilometres) and over 130 km of cross-country tracks. The Three Valleys was expanded in 1996 to incorporate a fourth valley, though the area kept the name Trois Vallées. The area comprises the resorts of Courchevel, La Tania, Méribel, Les Menuires-Saint Martin, Val Thorens and Orelle.

The resort comprises the sub-villages of: Méribel-Mottaret, at an altitude of 1,750 m towards the head of the Allues Valley—served by the Plattiers gondola which provides access to neighbouring resorts Les Menuires and Val Thorens; Raffort and La Gittaz, which are served by the Meribel Olympic Gondola; Chandon, which has free bus access to resort; and Méribel Village at 1,400 m on the road to Courchevel 1850 at the bottom of the Lapin piste and start of the Golf Chair to the popular beginners skiing area The Altiport.

== Lift system ==
Name	Type	Persons per hour	Year of construction	Manufacturer
Table Verte	Chairlift fixed 4 places	1250	1981	Poma
Burgin 1	Gondola 6 places	1700	1982	Poma
Burgin 2	Gondola 6 places	1700	1982	Poma
Plattieres 2	Gondola 6 places	2200	1983	Poma
Plattieres 1	Gondola 6 places	2200	1984	Poma
Plattieres 3	Gondola 6 places	2200	1984	Poma
Arolles	Chairlift fixed 4 places	1800	1985	Skirail
Rocher de la Loze	Chairlift fixed 4 places	1500	1988	Poma
Mont-Vallon	Gondola 12 places	3400	1988	Poma
Rhodos	Gondola 12 places	2025	1989	Von Roll
Mures Rouges	Chairlift detachable 4 places	1800	1989	Poma
Roc de Fer	Chairlift fixed 4 places	1460	1990	Poma
Olympe 1	Gondola 6 places	920	1990	Poma
Olympe 2	Gondola 6 places	920	1990	Poma
Olympe 3	Gondola 6 places	920	1990	Poma
Olympic Express	Chairlift detachable 4 places	1500	1990	Poma
Morel	Chairlift fixed 3 places	700	1991	Poma
Côtes Brune	Chairlift detachable 4 places	2070	1991	Poma
Combes	Chairlift detachable 4 places	2400	1994	Doppelmayr
Pas du Lac 1	Gondola 8 places	3000	1997	Poma
Pas du Lac 2	Gondola 8 places	3000	1997	Poma
Adret	Chairlift detachable 6 places	2400	1998	Poma
Dent de Burgin	Chairlift detachable 6 places	2400	2000	Poma
Altiport	Chairlift detachable 8 places	3400	2000	Poma
Plan des Mains	Chairlift detachable 6 places	3000	2002	Leitner
Plan de l'Homme	Chairlift detachable 6 places	3000	2004	Poma
Châtelet	Chairlift detachable 6 places	2200	2006	Poma
Chalets	Gondola pulsed 6 places	522	2007	Poma
Tougnète 2	Chairlift detachable 6 places covered	3600	2007	Poma
Tougnète 1	Gondola 6 places	1500	2008	Poma
Golf	Chairlift detachable 4 places	1500	2009	Poma
Altiport	Button lift continuous	500	2009	Poma
Doron	Conveyor belt covered		2010	Poma
Les Loupiots	Conveyor belt			Poma
Foret	Rope tow			Poma
Combe	Button lift detachable			Poma
Cotes	Button lift detachable			Poma
Escargot	Button lift continuous		2005	Poma
Arpasson	Button lift continuous		2006	Poma
Roc de Tougne 1 & 2	Button lift detachable			Poma
Aigle	Button lift detachable			Poma
Sitelle	Button lift detachable			Poma
Stade	Button lift continuous			Poma

Past projects

- For the 2012 season, the Burgin-Saulire 2 gondola is being replaced, and the new lift will be called Saulire Express 2. It will be constructed by Poma, and will take a new route up the Méribel Couloir, arriving at the same position as the Saulire cable car from the Courchevel side.
- For the 2013 season, the Burgin-Saulire 1 gondola is being replaced, and the new lift will be called Saulire Express 1. It will be constructed by Poma, and will be joined to Saulire Express 2 for a continuous journey up the mountain, first gondola station in France MULTIX to sections decoupled amount of work 24 million.
- Plattieres 1 & 2 are being replaced by a new gondola constructed by Poma, called Plattieres 1. This new lift will cut the journey time from 25 minutes to 9 minutes, and the new cabins will replace the old six seat, back to back gondolas with more comfortable 10 seat cabins. Construction will begin at the end of the 2011 season, and the old lift will continue to run through the 2012 season.

== Tarentaise Valley skiing ==
The Tarentaise Valley has the biggest concentration of world-class ski resorts in the world; the best known neighbouring systems are Paradiski (Les Arcs, La Plagne) and Espace Killy (Val-d'Isère and Tignes). A weekly lift ticket in Méribel/Les Trois Vallées offers a choice to ski one day in each of the other two systems mentioned. There were once plans to interlink all systems and resorts to create the – by far – largest ski area in the world. However that vision was ended with the creation of the Vanoise National Park.

== See also ==
- List of ski areas and resorts in Europe
- Méribel Airport
- Battle of Méribel
