= MFX =

MFX or mfx may refer to:

- Manx Financial Group (London Stock Exchange symbol)
- Melo language, Ethiopia (ISO 639-3 code)
- Méribel Altiport, Savoie, France (IATA code)
- Multi effects, a pedal or device that contains many different electronic effects
