= Courchevel (commune) =

Commune in Auvergne-Rhône-Alpes, France

- Commune
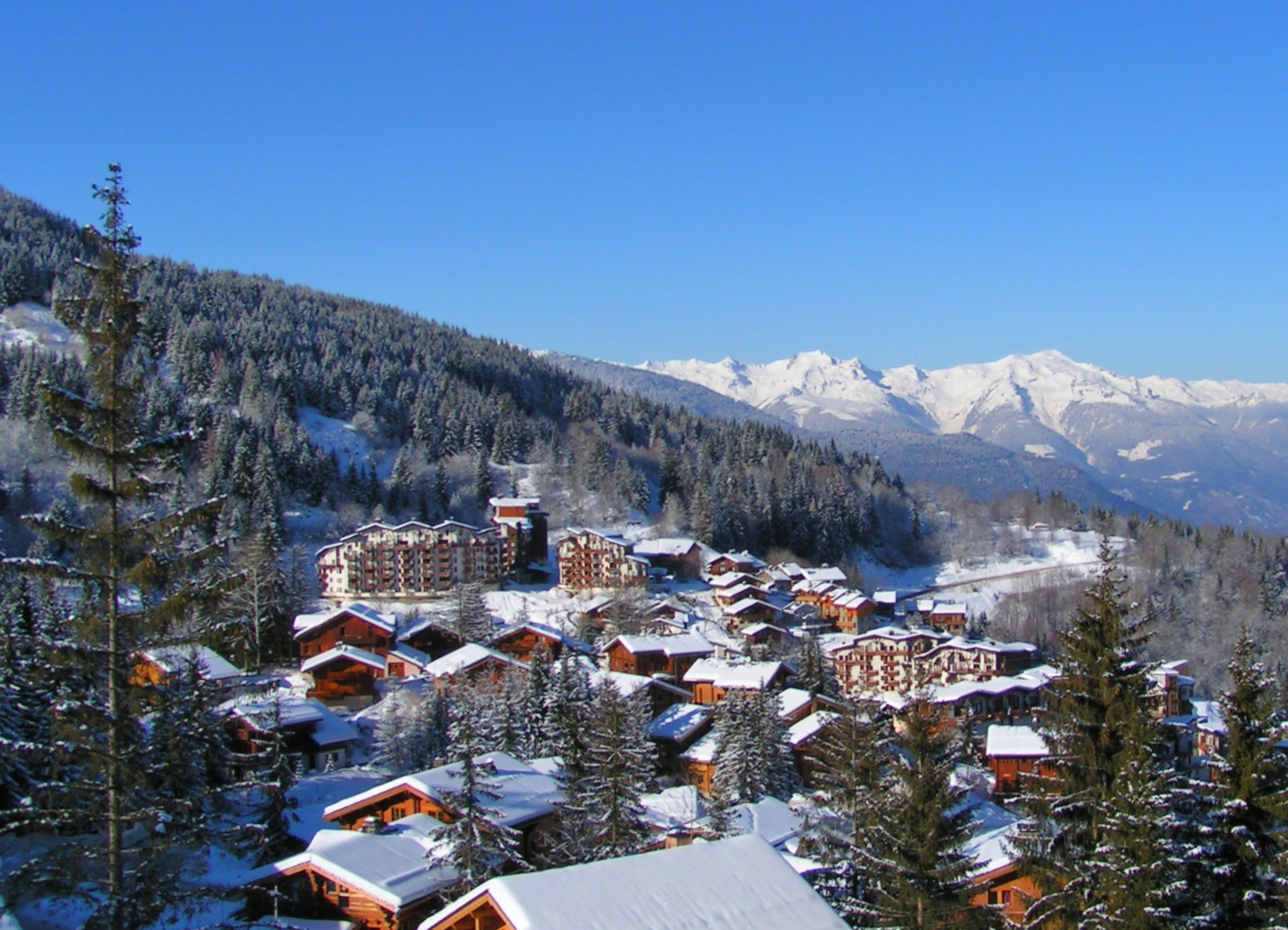
- La Tania ski resort

- Coat of arms
- Location of Courchevel
- Location within France Location within Auvergne-Rhône-Alpes
- Coordinates: 45°26′06″N 6°38′17″E
- Country: France
- Region: Auvergne-Rhône-Alpes
- Department: Savoie
- Arrondissement: Albertville
- Canton: Moûtiers
- Intercommunality: Val Vanoise

Government
  - Mayor (2020–2026): Jean Yves Pachod
- Area^{1}: 68.90 km^{2} (26.60 sq mi)
- Population (2023): 2,290
  - Density: 33.2/km^{2} (86.1/sq mi)
- Time zone: UTC+01:00 (CET)
  - Summer (DST): UTC+02:00 (CEST)
- INSEE/Postal code: 73227 /73120
- ^{1} French Land Register data, which excludes lakes, ponds, glaciers > 1 km^{2} (0.386 sq mi or 247 acres) and river estuaries.

Courchevel (French pronunciation: [kuʁʃəvɛl]; Arpitan: Ecôrchevél) is a commune in the department of Savoie, southeastern France. The commune was established on 1 January 2017 by merging the two formerly distinct communes of Saint-Bon-Tarentaise (the seat) and La Perrière. It takes its name from the eponymous nearby ski resort of Courchevel.

== Population ==
Population data refer to the area corresponding with the commune as of January 2025.

Historical population
Year	Pop.	±% p.a.
1968	1,534	—
1975	1,737	+1.79%
1982	1,912	+1.38%
1990	2,033	+0.77%
1999	2,203	+0.90%
2007	2,345	+0.78%
2012	2,387	+0.36%
2017	2,361	−0.22%
2023	2,290	−0.51%
Source: INSEE

== Heraldry ==
Blazon: Per pale or, a twin-headed eagle azure, and gules a cross argent (Savoy); overall a chief gules supported argent Comments: Arms of Courchevel city, French Savoy.

== See also ==
- Communes of the Savoie department
