= Le Chabichou =

Hotel and restaurant in Courchevel, France

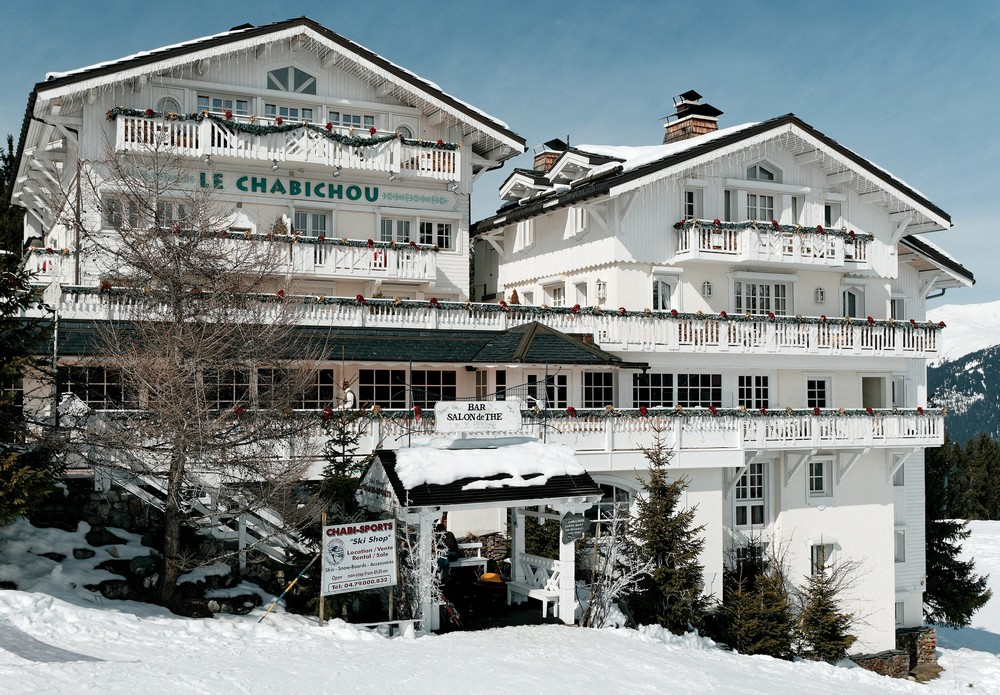

- Location in Savoie

General information
- Location: Courchevel, Savoie, France
- Coordinates: 45°24′58″N 6°37′48″E

Other information
- Number of rooms: 41

Website
- www.chabichou-courchevel.com

Le Chabichou is a 4-star hotel and a 2 Michelin-starred restaurant in Courchevel, Savoie, France. The hotel was opened in 1962 by Michel Rochedy. The restaurant received its first Michelin star in 1979 and its second in 1984.

== Bibliography ==
- 1998 : Les sommets de Michel Rochedy - par Alain Berenguer - Henri Michel Editions
- 2007 : Le Chabichou ou La montagne apprivoisée - par Michel Rochedy - Glénat
