= Courchevel =

Ski resort in France

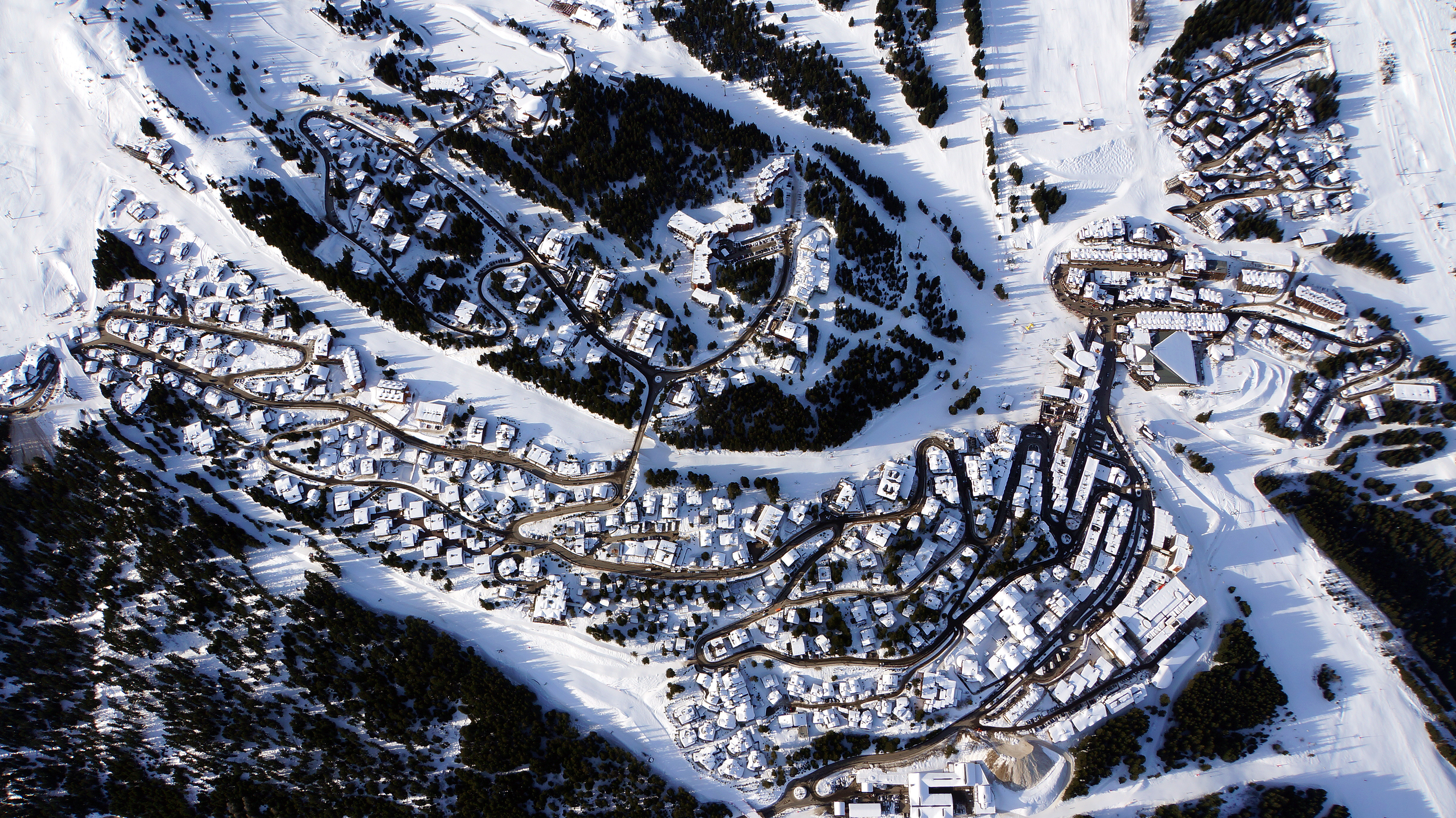
- Courchevel

- Location within France Location within Auvergne-Rhône-Alpes Location within Alps
- Location: Savoie, France
- Nearest city: Chambéry
- Coordinates: 45°24′54″N 6°38′02″E
- Top elevation: 2,738 m (8,983 ft)
- Base elevation: 1,100 m (3,600 ft)
- Trails: 96 total; 19 beginner; 35 easy; 34 intermediate; 8 difficult
- Lift system: 58 (Capacity 67,254 per hour)
- Website: www.courchevel.com

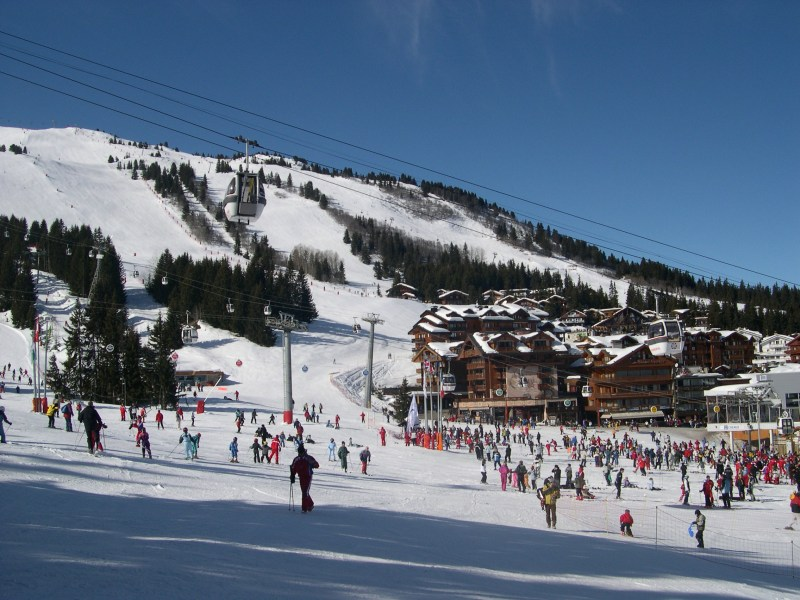
Courchevel 1850, the highest part of the resort

Courchevel (French pronunciation: [kuʁʃəvɛl]) is a French Alps ski resort located in the Tarentaise Valley. It is a part of Les Trois Vallées, the largest linked ski areas in the world.

Courchevel also refers to the towns of Courchevel 1300 (Le Praz), Courchevel 1550, Courchevel 1650 (Moriond), and Courchevel 1850, which are named for their elevations in metres. The resort centre of Courchevel is at 1,747 metres (5,732 ft) above sea level.

Sports events from the 1992 Winter Olympics and the 2023 World Ski Championships took place in Courchevel. The ski resort is considered exclusive, attracting wealthy clientele including royal families. It hosts one of the largest concentrations of five-star ranking luxury hotels.

== Location ==
Courchevel was formerly part of the commune of Saint-Bon-Tarentaise, but was merged in 2017 with La Perrière into the new commune of Courchevel. In spite of the name, the commune's administrative offices are not located in Courchevel, but remain in the nearby village of Saint-Bon-Tarentaise. Courchevel is in the Tarentaise Valley, Savoie département, Auvergne-Rhône-Alpes region. Courchevel is part of the Trois Vallées, which comprises the resorts of Courchevel, La Tania, Méribel, Les Menuires-Saint Martin, Val Thorens and Orelle.

== History ==
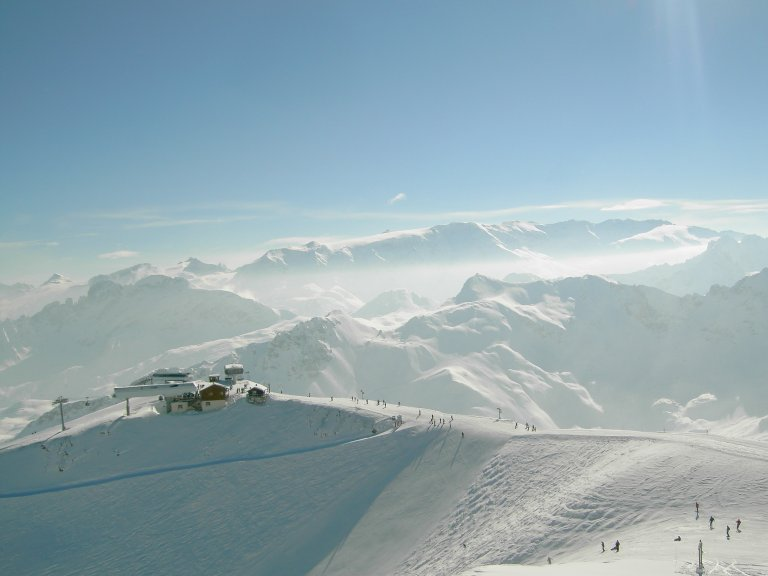
View from Saulire peak, 2700 m.

The original resort was planned during World War II with a study in 1942 by the Vichy regime and in a doctorate by the town planner Laurent Chappis. Chappis was a natural choice to direct the development of the resort in the immediate post-war years. Courchevel 1850 was significant as it was the first resort in France to be constructed from scratch, rather than based around an existing village.

=== Tarentaise Valley Skiing ===
Within the Tarentaise Valley lies the biggest concentration of world-class ski resorts in the world. The most widely-known neighbour systems are Paradiski (Les Arcs, La Plagne) and Espace Killy (Val d'Isère and Tignes). A weekly lift ticket in Courchevel/Les Trois Vallées gives one a choice to ski one day in each of the other two systems mentioned. There were once plans to interlink all systems and resorts to create the largest ski area in the world (by far); however, that vision ended with the creation of the Vanoise National Park.

=== 1992 Winter Olympics ===
The Courchevel valley also includes the town of La Tania, built as competitors' accommodation for the 1992 Winter Olympics in Albertville. Le Praz hosted the Olympic ski jumping and Nordic combined competitions for those games that took place at Tremplin du Praz. There was a ski jump in Courchevel 1850 on the snowfront, which was removed recently due to safety precautions.

=== 2019 fire ===
During the early hours of 20 January 2019, an inferno ignited within a structure located in the hamlet of Courchevel 1850, designated for seasonal resort workers. This unfortunate event claimed the lives of two individuals and left at least 22 others with injuries. As documented by a local French newspaper, a rapid and coordinated response from 130 firefighters played a pivotal role in mitigating the emergency, underscoring their crucial efforts in containing the fire's impact on the community.

=== 2023 Alpine Ski World Championships ===
In May 2018, Courchevel was named a joint host of the 2023 FIS Alpine World Ski Championships with Méribel. It was the first time since 2009 that France had hosted the FIS World Championships, when they took place in Val d'Isère. Races in Courchevel will finish in Courchevel Le Praz. A new super-leisure centre called L'Alpinium is under construction in Le Praz and will improve connections to Courchevel 1850 and provide more parking.

== Resort ==
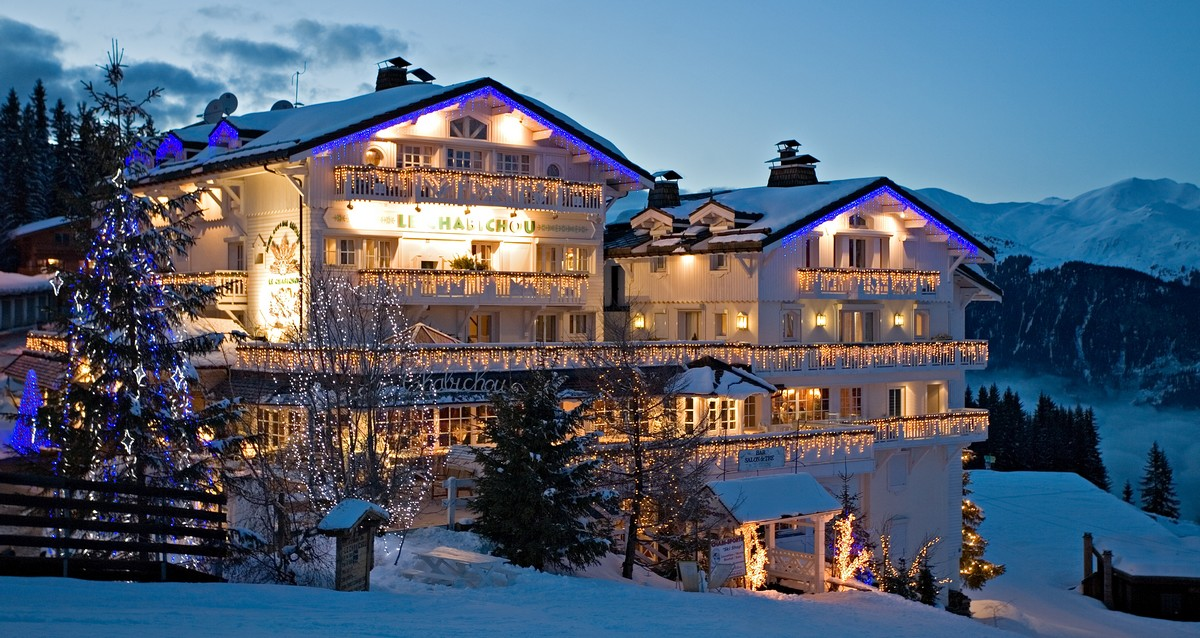
Le Chabichou hotel, Courchevel 1850

Courchevel is the most eastern resort of the Three Valleys, the biggest connected ski area in the world. It consists of four satellite villages: Courchevel Le Praz, Courchevel 1550, Courchevel 1650 and Courchevel 1850. Its highest resort, Courchevel 1850, is considered exclusive, attracting wealthy clientele including royal families. In the 2011–2012 season, Courchevel rebranded, changing the names of each of the four villages in a move away from the association with altitude. Courchevel 1850 is now known simply as Courchevel, Courchevel 1650 was renamed Courchevel Moriond; Courchevel 1550 is now called Courchevel Village and Courchevel 1330 was renamed Courchevel Le Praz.

Courchevel has 24 luxury hotels with a 5-star ranking. In 2011 France introduced a 6th star ranking for hotels, named "palaces". Eight hotels in France have received this rating, of which two are in Courchevel's Jardin Alpin area. The resort has seven restaurants with Michelin stars, of which four have two stars, including Le Chabichou. It also hosts a variety of luxury shops including Louis Vuitton, Hermès, Valentino, Loro Piana, Prada, Cartier, Fendi, Dior and Chanel. The majority of Courchevel's visitors are Gulf Arabs and Russian all of whom are considered luxury clientele. Many Russians visit during New Year and Russian Orthodox Christmas on 7 January. As a result, the first two weeks of January are high season weeks in Courchevel. The resort is also very popular with Arabs, especially those from the Middle East. As a result of this popularity the resort's name is now associated with the super-rich in Russia and Middle East. The most expensive pharmacy in France is located in Courchevel.

Courchevel has one of the largest bases for ski instructors and other seasonal workers due to the size of the three valleys area. Courchevel's couloirs are considered some of the most difficult black runs in the world. Courchevel, along with the Three Vallees, is renowned for a wide selection of difficult pistes and off-piste, powder skiing.

Courchevel's sister city is Park City, Utah in the United States, and it has a red-graded ski piste named "Park City".

== Airport ==
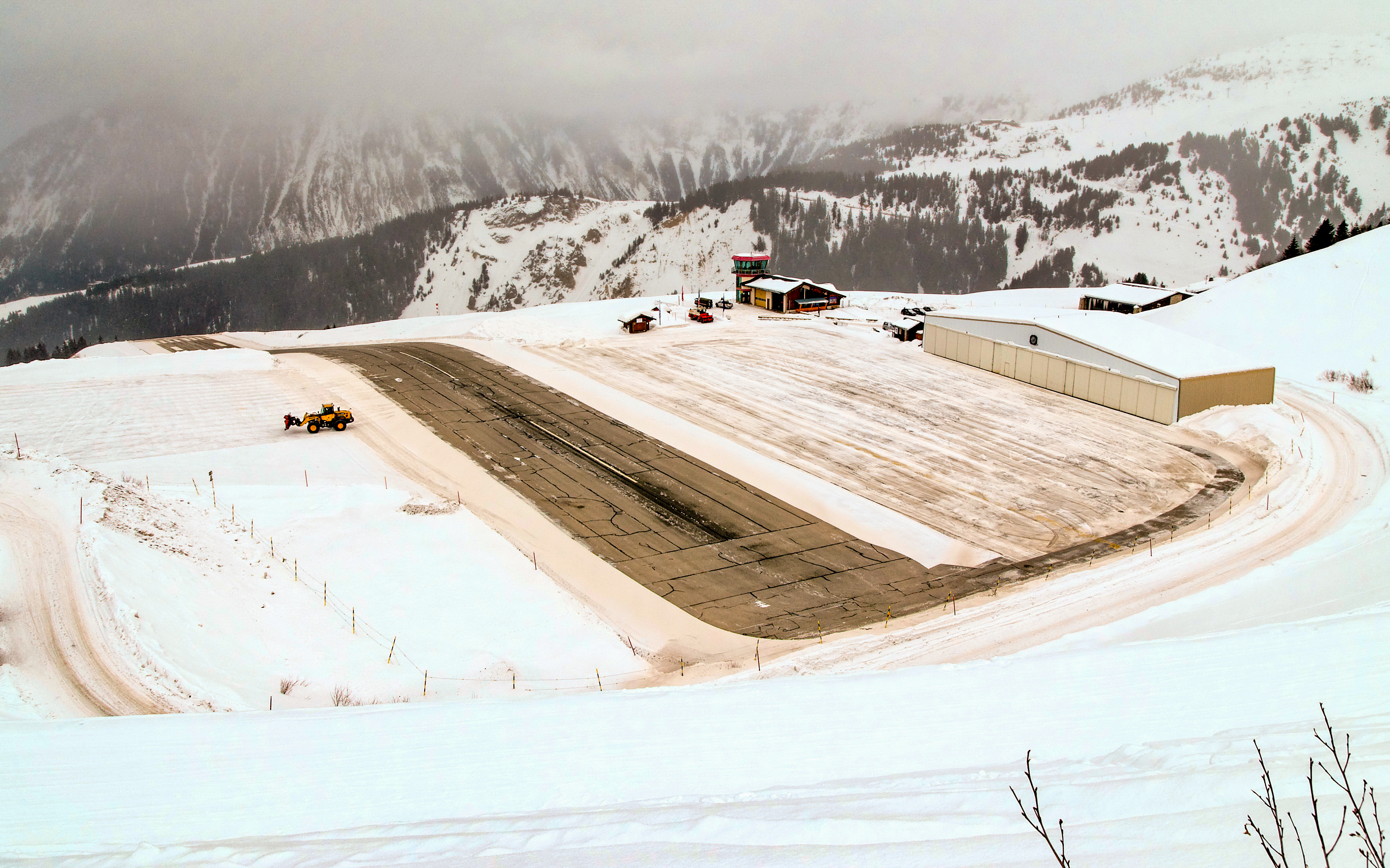
Courchevel's Altiport

Courchevel's airport has a very short and steeply sloped runway, with a length of 525 metres (1,722 ft) and a gradient of 18.5%. The airport has a dangerous approach through deep valleys, which can only be performed by specially certified pilots. On landing there is no go-around procedure, as most of the world's airports have; there is merely a very steep hill which has seen a few accidents since the airport first opened. Larger propeller aircraft such as the Twin Otter and Dash 7 (carrying up to 50 people) have been regular users of the airport over the years, but have since been phased out of use and smaller Cessnas and helicopters are now the main users.

The History Channel program Most Extreme Airports, ranks it as the seventh most dangerous airport in the world.

== Sister cities ==
- Park City, United States
