= Château de Saint-Michel-de-Maurienne =

Castle in France

- Château sur Saint-Michel
- Near Saint-Michel-de-Maurienne in France
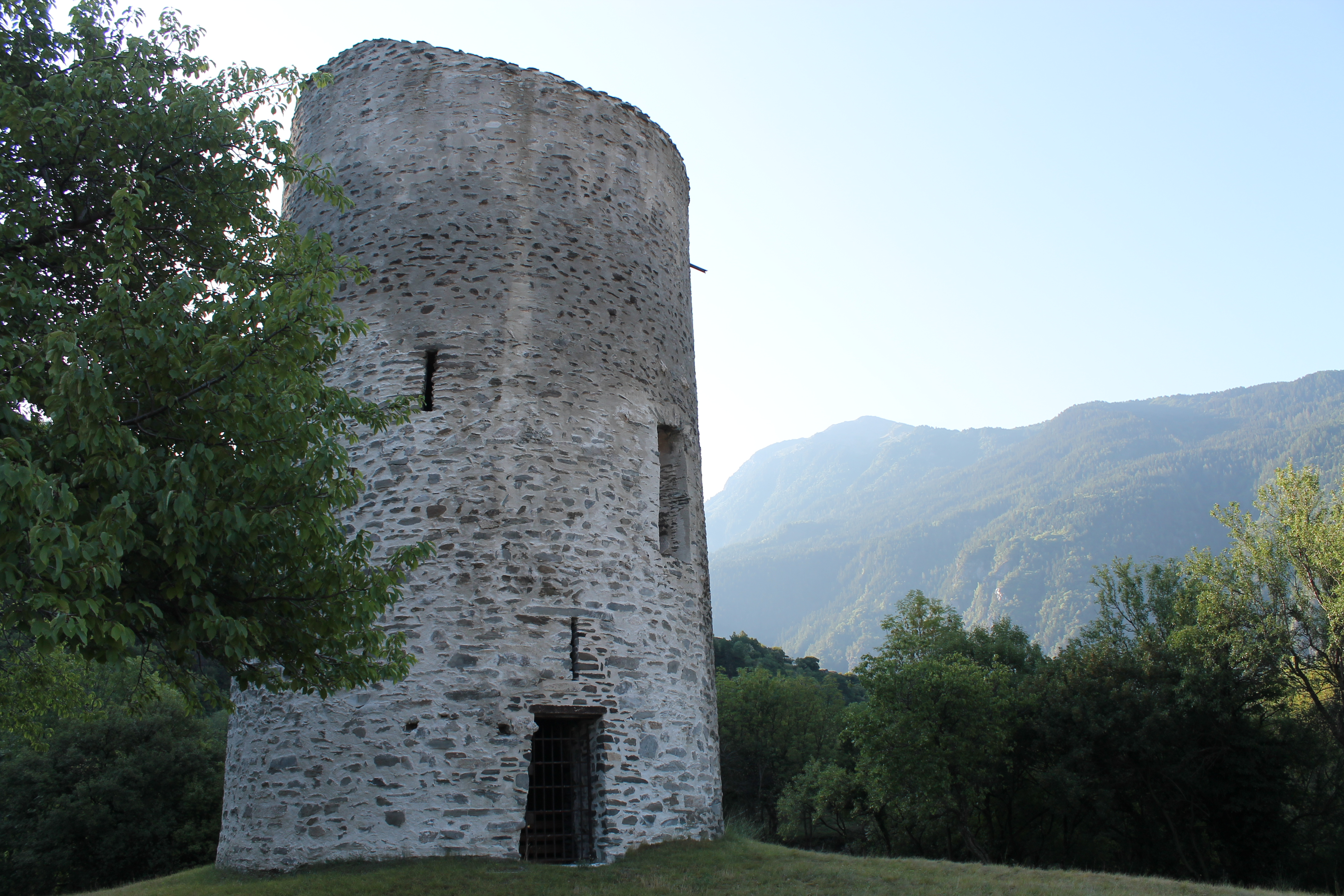

Site information
- Type: Castle
- Owner: Commune of Saint-Michel-de-Maurienne
- Condition: Ruin

Location
- Coordinates: 45.2182287°N 6.4761692°E

Site history
- Built: 13th century

Garrison information
- Past commanders: Lords of Saint-Michel

The Château de Saint-Michel-de-Maurienne is a 13th-century castle in the commune of Saint-Michel-de-Maurienne Savoie département of France.

== Naming ==
The castle is known in French records as the Château or Châtel de Saint-Michel, and later as Château sur Saint-Michel. In Latin, its name is Castrum Sancti Michaelis.

== Geography ==
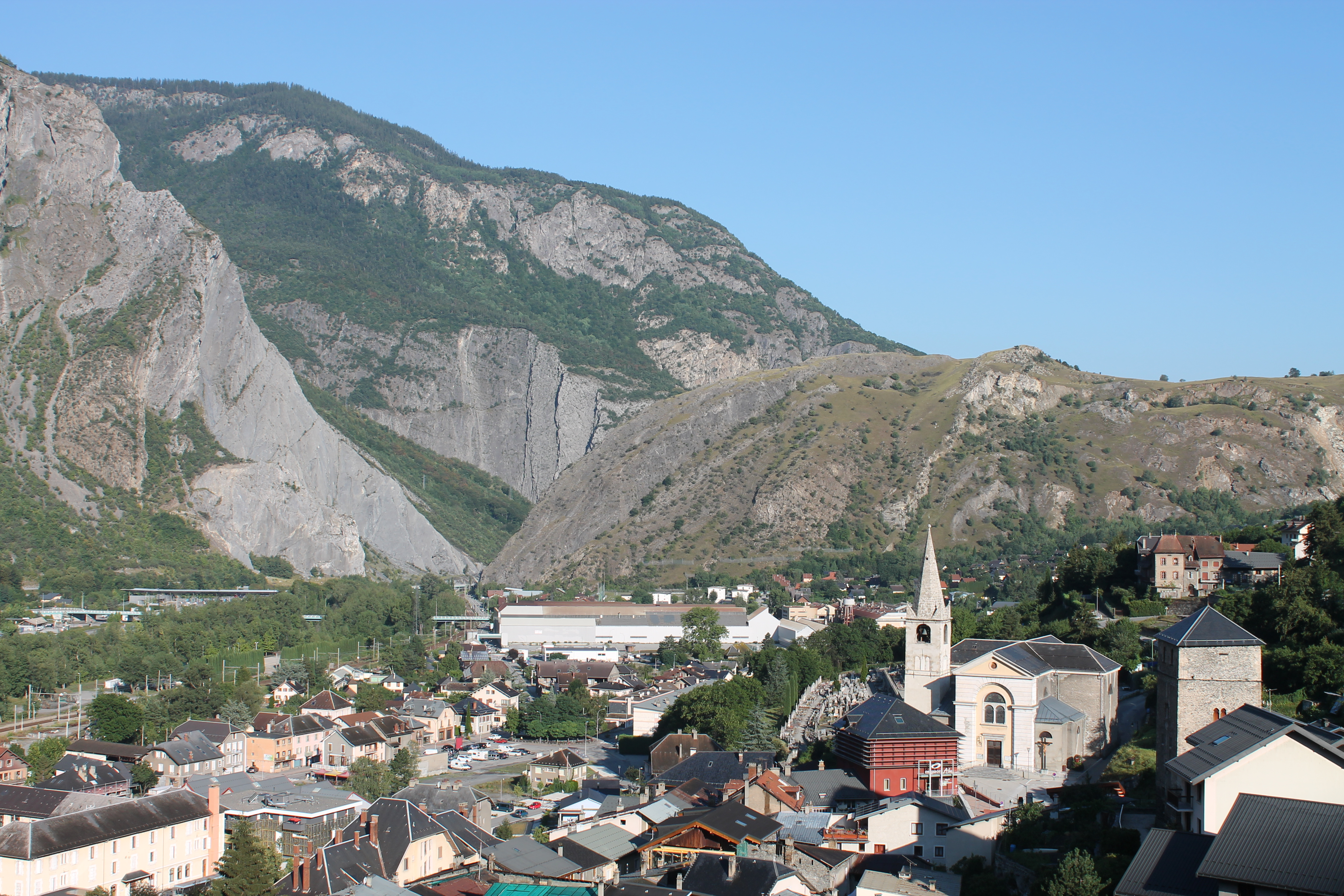
View from the castle esplanade of the town of Saint-Michel. In the background, the Pas-du-Roc.

The ancient castle, of which only a single tower remains, dominates the town of Saint-Michel-de-Maurienne to the east, on the right bank of the River Arc. The location is a rounded hill called Chambarlet.

The castle therefore dominates the town but also an ancient glacial tarn, called Saint-Michel, closed on its downstream side by the glacial remnant of Pas-du-Roc that separates it from Saint-Martin-de-la-Porte, and also closes from the south the access to the valley of Valloirette and the town of Valloire. Finally, it oversees the route leading to the Tarentaise Valley, through the mountain pass of the Encombres and the mountain towns of Beaune and Thyl.

The location is strategic, making it "an important military junction position positioned at the crossing of roads leading to Italy, Tarentaise and Briançonnais". The historian Christian Sorrel wrote that through the medieval period, "in the 14th century, people from the Piedmontese valleys, Tarentaise, l'Oisans and Briançonnais, coming by passes with an altitude of between 2,000 metres (6,600 ft) and 3,000 metres (9,800 ft) crowded the fairs of Saint-Michel-de-Maurienne".

== History ==
=== Medieval period ===
The castle belonged to the noble family of Saint-Michel. A Lord Guillaume of Saint-Michel was mentioned in approximately 1104. He formed an alliance with the family of Ismidon de La Chambre. In fact, the son of Guillaume of Saint-Michel carried the name Ismidon I of Saint-Michel, in around 1151. Ismidon I had two sons, Pierre and Ismidon II, who were made guarantors of the House of La Chambre in 1153.

The local historian, abbot Félix Bernard, advanced the hypothesis that the Pierre called Maréchal de Savoie (Petrus Mareschalus), cited around 1190, was the aforementioned Pierre, the elder brother of Ismidon II. According to Bernard, he was the origin of the Mareschal family of Saint-Michel. The lords of Saint-Michel owned the castle until 1295, when the last member died.

The town of Saint-Michel belonged to the House of Savoy in Maurienne and not to the bishops of Maurienne. It was the most important town under their possession before they achieved control over the episcopal city of Saint-Jean-de-Maurienne. The town was the capital of the mestralie (an administrative unit made up of multiple parishes) in the Savoyard organisation of Maurienne, whose seat was probably in the fortified house that vaults the lower entrance to the town.

In 1309, the castle came into the possession of the family of Mareschal of Saint-Michel. According to Bernard, that family was then the ancestors of the great viscountal family of the Miolans-Charbonnières-La Chambre. In fact, in November 1309, the young nobleman Jacques Mareschal, son of Jean Mareschal, gave homage to the Count of Savoy for the Castrum Sancti Michaelis. In 1550, the castle was still in the domain of the Mareschals. However, Pierre Mareschal had no heir and his inheritance went to his brother, Jean Balthazard de Duin.

=== Later history ===
François de Bavoz de Saint-Julien was commander of the castle in 1580, having his brother Jean de Bavoz as a deputy.

In 1597, the castle was taken by French troops under Lieutenant-General Lesdiguières.

=== Ownership ===
In April 1599, Duke Charles-Emmanuel I of Savoie, in need of money, sold the revenue of the mestralie of Saint-Michel for 10,000 gold écus to Pierre de Duin (Duyn) of the Maréchal family, baron of the Val d'Isère and governor of the castle in Conflans, and his brother Jean-Balthazard. After that sale, the two brothers formed the branches of the families of the counts of the Val d'Isère (Valdisère) and of the marquis of Marclaz. In 1608, they obtained jurisdiction over the mestralie. In the following year, that sale was canceled by a legal decision, and the duke was granted in compensation the purely honorary title of baron of Saint-Michel. The family pursued a legal action to recover the jurisdiction up until 1620, in the course of which Pierre Mareschal Duyn de la Val d'Isère gave the castle to his brother, Jean-Balthazard. The trial, however, prevented Jean-Balthazard from keeping the honorary title of baron of Saint-Michel.

A few years later, his son, Philibert Mareschal Duin de la Val d'Isère, was made Count of Saint-Michel. Philibert's son was made marquis of Marclaz, but he was usually called, as were his descendants, marquis of Saint-Michel, in reference to his ancestors.

== Description ==
Vestiges of a round tower from the 13th century.

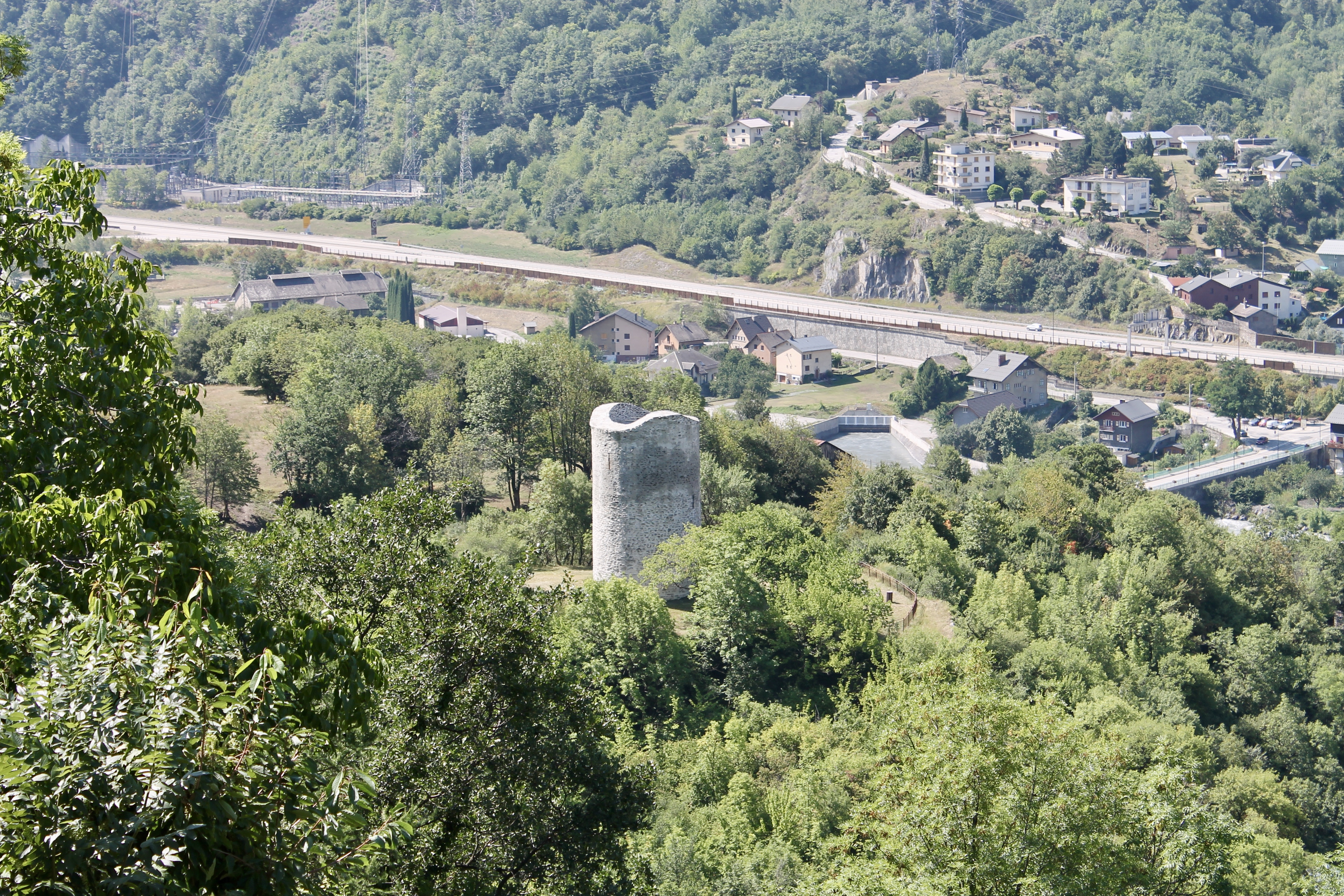
High view from the castle site.

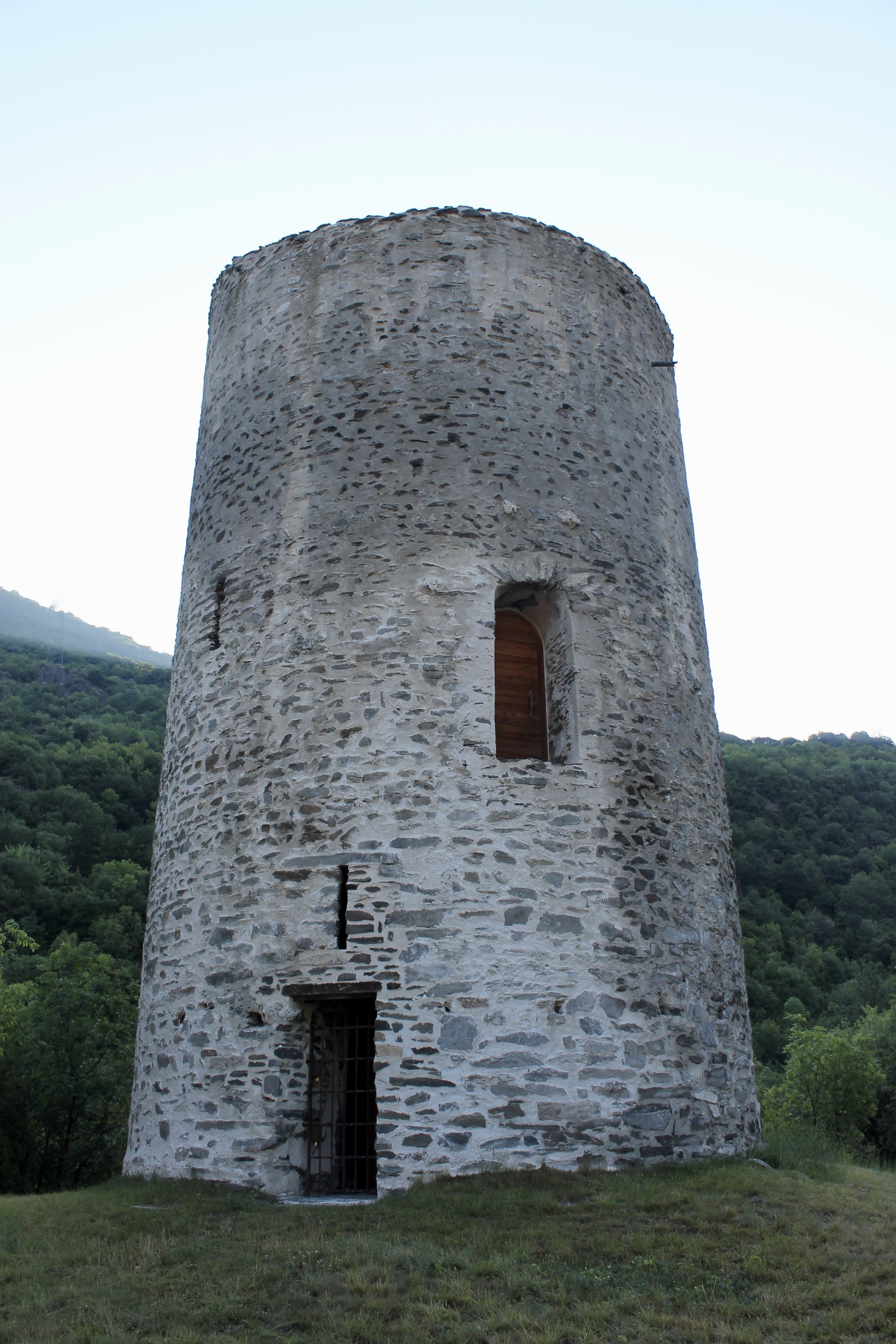
Vestige of the restored round tower.

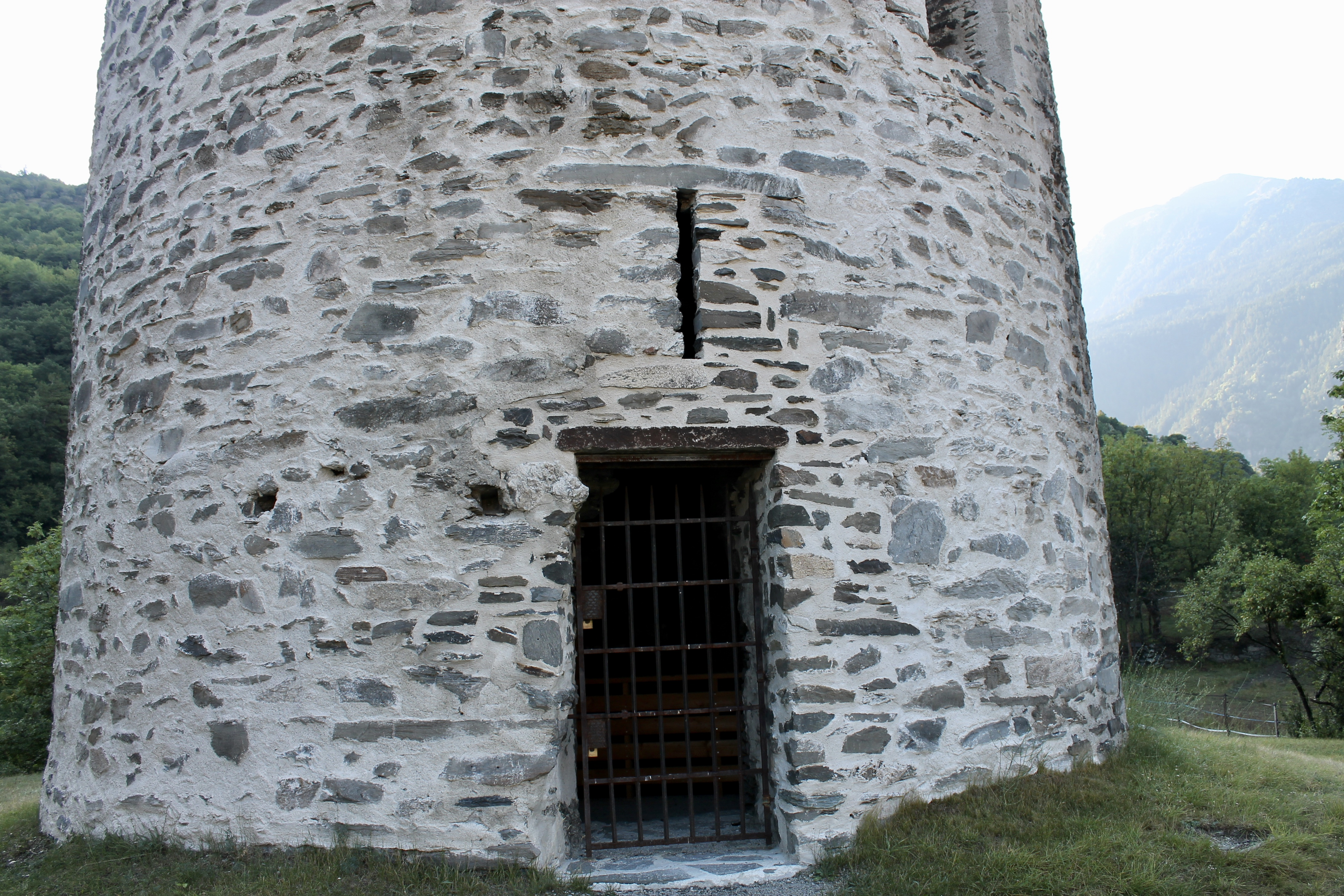
Entrance of the restored round tower.

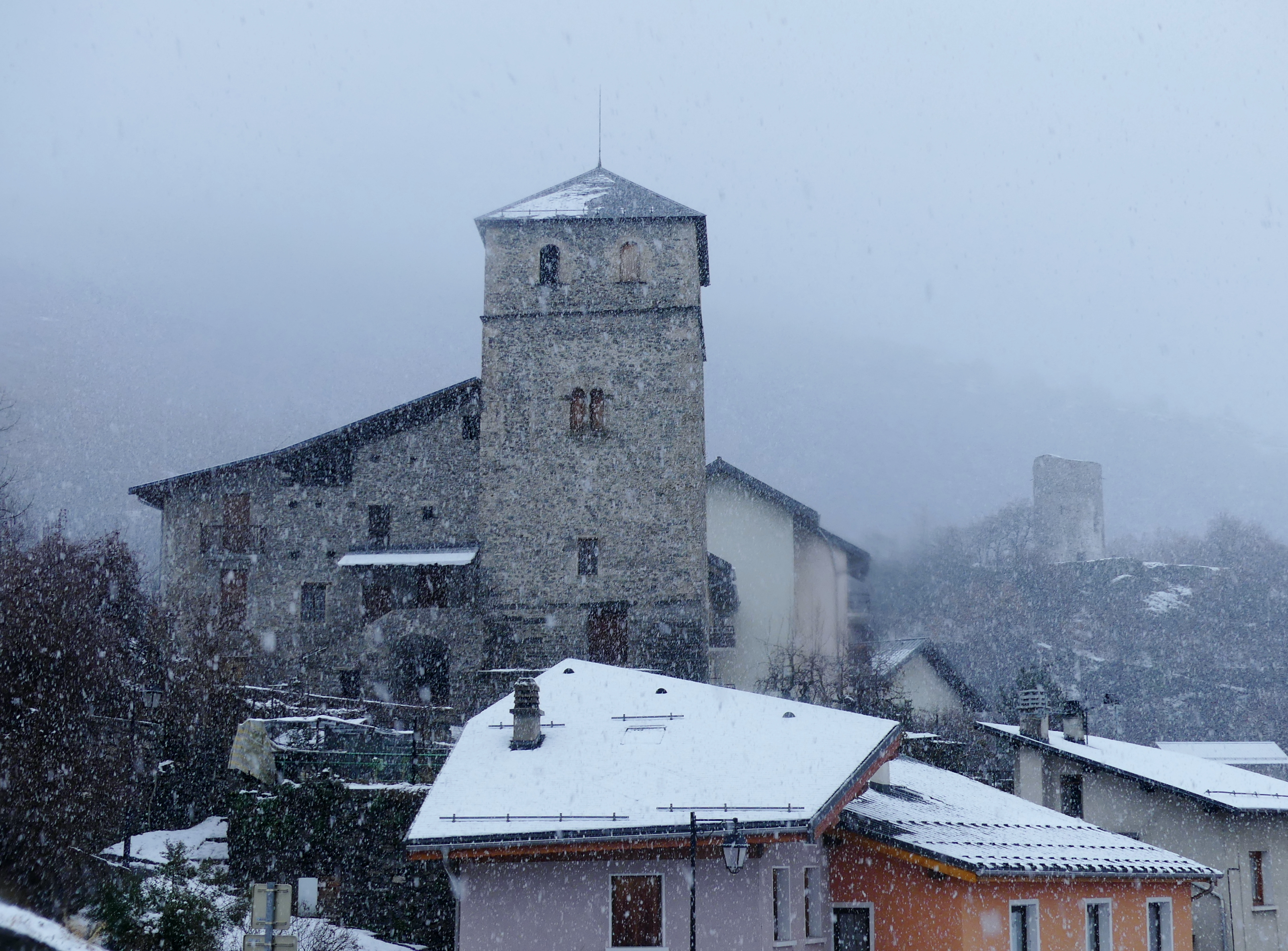
View from the church of Saint-Michel-de-Maurienne.

== See also ==
- List of castles in France

== Bibliography ==
- Brocard, Michèle; Messiez-Poche, Maurice; Dompnier, Pierre (1983). Histoire des communes savoyardes: La Maurienne - Chamoux - La Rochette (vol. 3) (in French). Roanne: Éditions Horvath. ISBN 978-2-7171-0289-5. Histoire des communes savoyardes 1983.
- Chapier, Georges (1961). Châteaux savoyards - Faucigny et Chablais (in French). Vol. 5. Grenoble: Éditions Revue Les Alpes. Chapier 1961.
- Chapier, Georges (2005). Châteaux Savoyards: Faucigny, Chablais, Tarentaise, Maurienne, Savoie propre, Genevois. L'amateur Averti (in French). Éditions La Découvrance. pp. 68–70. ISBN 978-2-8426-5326-2. Chapier 2005.
- Julliand, Bernard (March 1986). "Entre l'Arc et le Roc". Mémoires et documents de la Société savoisienne d'histoire et d'archéologie: Saint-Michel de Maurienne. L'histoire en Savoie. Vol. 81. Société savoisienne d'histoire et d'archéologie. ISSN 0046-7510.
