= La Perrière, Savoie =

La Perrière La Pèrîr (Arpitan)
- Part of Courchevel
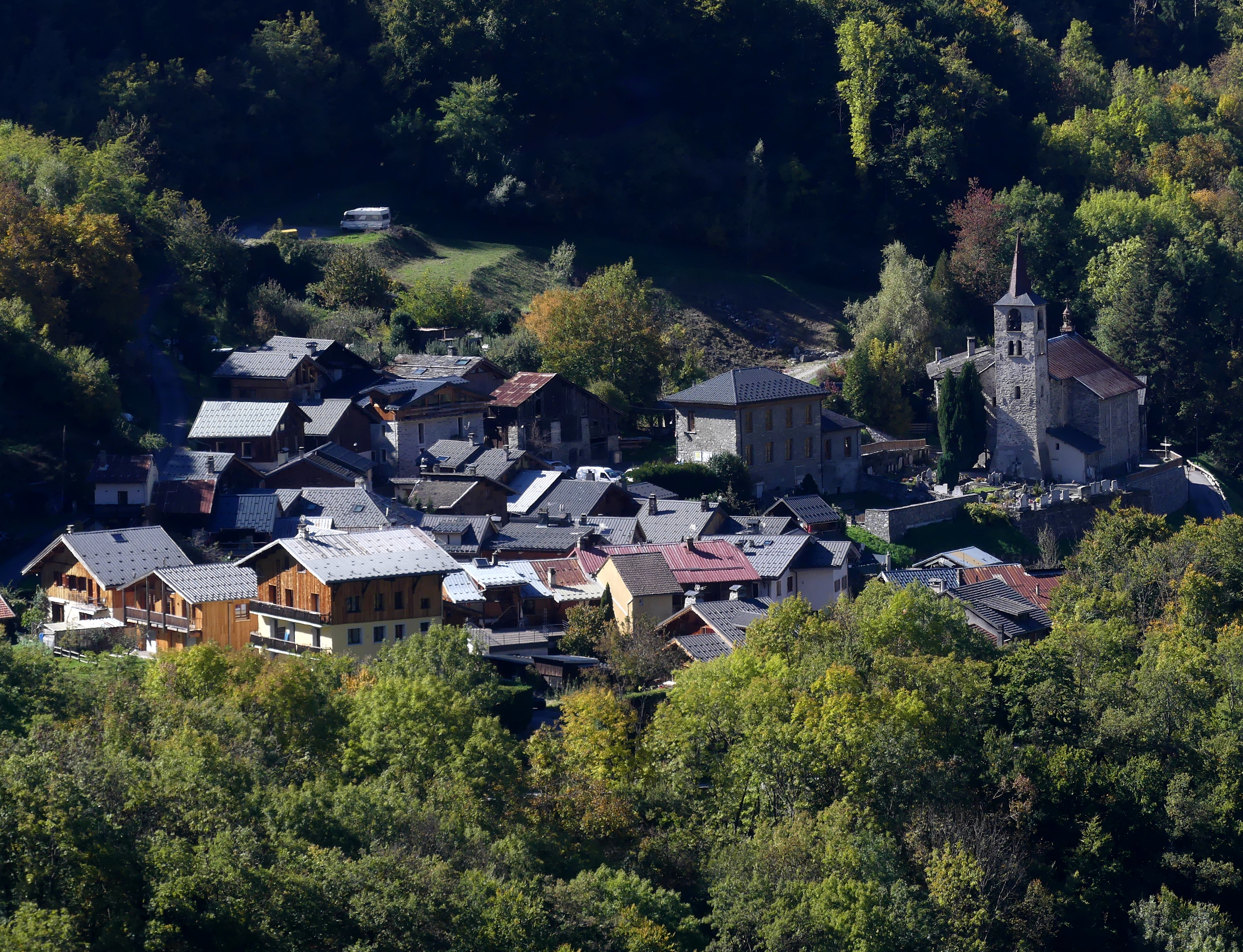
- Location of La Perrière
- Location within France Location within Auvergne-Rhône-Alpes
- Coordinates: 45°26′45″N 6°35′40″E
- Country: France
- Region: Auvergne-Rhône-Alpes
- Department: Savoie
- Arrondissement: Albertville
- Canton: Moûtiers
- Commune: Courchevel
- Area^{1}: 9.96 km^{2} (3.85 sq mi)
- Highest elevation: 2,527 m (8,291 ft)
- Lowest elevation: 599 m (1,965 ft)
- Population (2018): 498
  - Density: 50.0/km^{2} (129/sq mi)
- Time zone: UTC+01:00 (CET)
  - Summer (DST): UTC+02:00 (CEST)
- Postal code: 73120
- ^{1} French Land Register data, which excludes lakes, ponds, glaciers > 1 km^{2} (0.386 sq mi or 247 acres) and river estuaries.

La Perrière (French pronunciation: [la pɛʁjɛʁ]; Arpitan: La Pèrîr) is a former commune in the Savoie department in the Auvergne-Rhône-Alpes region in south-eastern France. On 1 January 2017, it was merged into the new commune Courchevel.

== See also ==
- Communes of the Savoie department
