= Saint-Bon-Tarentaise =

Saint-Bon-Tarentaise Sè Bon (Arpitan)
- Part of Courchevel
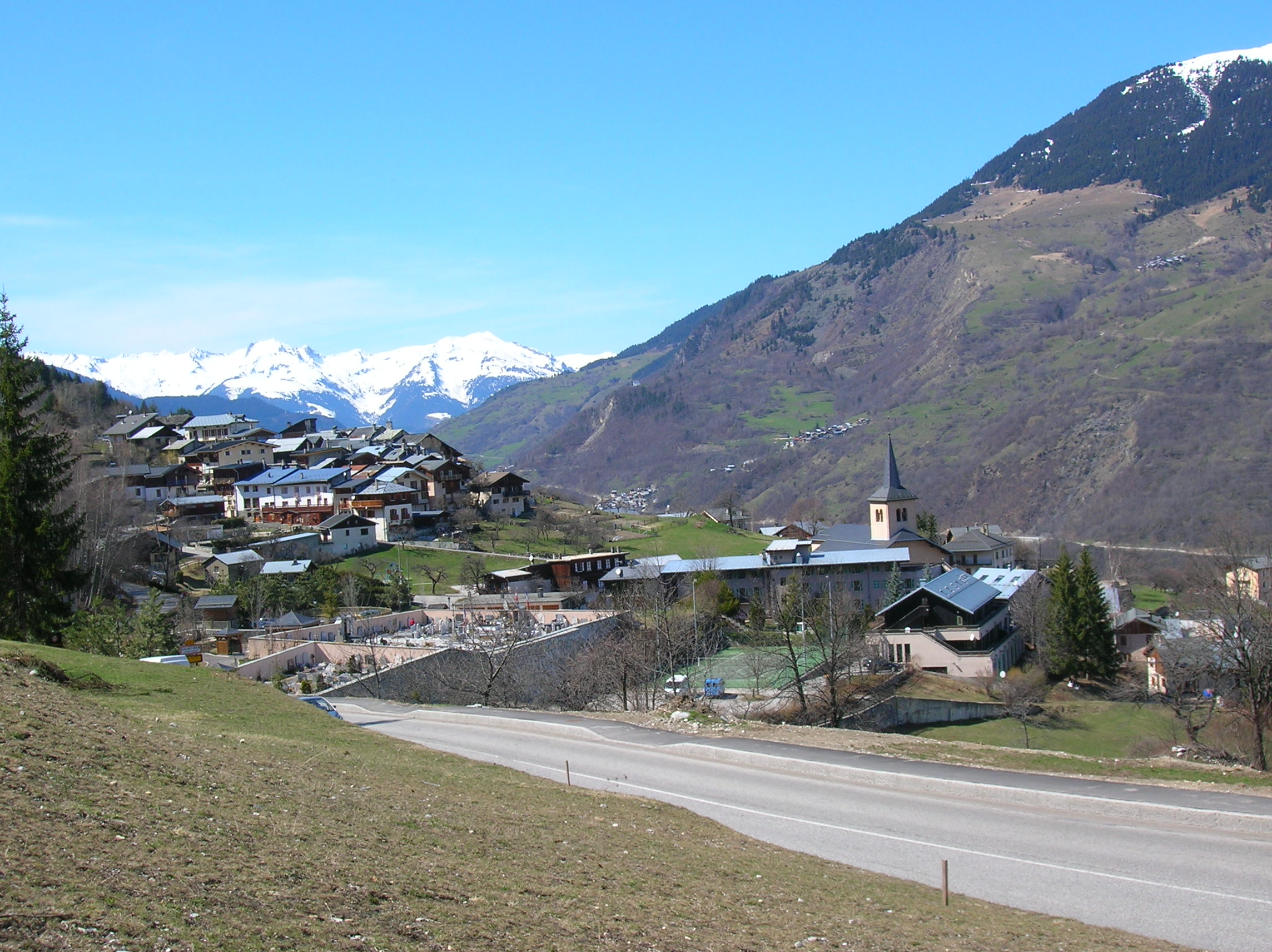
- A general view of Saint-Bon
- Location of Saint-Bon-Tarentaise
- Location within France Location within Auvergne-Rhône-Alpes
- Coordinates: 45°26′05″N 6°38′16″E
- Country: France
- Region: Auvergne-Rhône-Alpes
- Department: Savoie
- Arrondissement: Albertville
- Canton: Moûtiers
- Commune: Courchevel
- Area^{1}: 58.94 km^{2} (22.76 sq mi)
- Highest elevation: 3,054 m (10,020 ft)
- Lowest elevation: 700 m (2,300 ft)
- Population (2018): 1,864
  - Density: 31.63/km^{2} (81.91/sq mi)
- Time zone: UTC+01:00 (CET)
  - Summer (DST): UTC+02:00 (CEST)
- Postal code: 73120
- ^{1} French Land Register data, which excludes lakes, ponds, glaciers > 1 km^{2} (0.386 sq mi or 247 acres) and river estuaries.

Saint-Bon-Tarentaise (French pronunciation: [sɛ̃ bɔ̃ taʁɑ̃tɛz]; Arpitan: Sè Bon) is a former commune in the Savoie department in the Auvergne-Rhône-Alpes region in south-eastern France. On 1 January 2017, it was merged into the new commune Courchevel.

As well as Saint-Bon-Tarentaise itself, the commune also included the four villages (Le Praz-Courchevel 1300, Courchevel 1550, Moriond-Courchevel 1650 and Courchevel 1850) that together make up the ski resort of Courchevel.

== See also ==
- Communes of the Savoie department
