= Orelle =

Orelle Ozhèlo (Savoyard)
- Commune
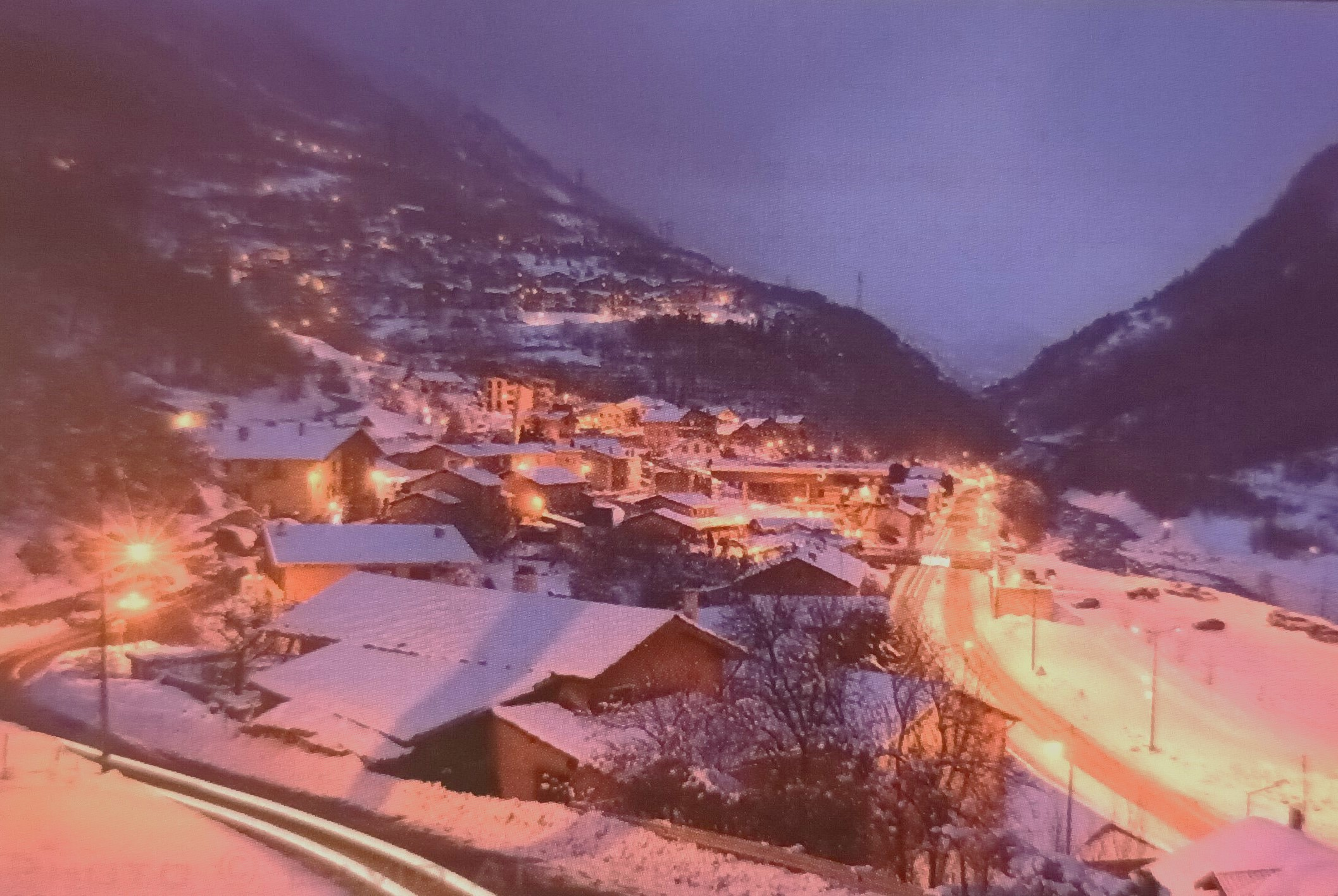
- A general view of Orelle

- Coat of arms
- Location of Orelle
- Location within France Location within Auvergne-Rhône-Alpes
- Coordinates: 45°12′36″N 6°32′16″E
- Country: France
- Region: Auvergne-Rhône-Alpes
- Department: Savoie
- Arrondissement: Saint-Jean-de-Maurienne
- Canton: Modane

Government
  - Mayor (2020–2026): Aimé Perret
- Area^{1}: 69.25 km^{2} (26.74 sq mi)
- Highest elevation: 3,400 m (11,200 ft)
- Lowest elevation: 819 m (2,687 ft)
- Population (2023): 324
  - Density: 4.68/km^{2} (12.1/sq mi)
- Time zone: UTC+01:00 (CET)
  - Summer (DST): UTC+02:00 (CEST)
- INSEE/Postal code: 73194 /73140
- Website: http://www.orelle.fr/
- ^{1} French Land Register data, which excludes lakes, ponds, glaciers > 1 km^{2} (0.386 sq mi or 247 acres) and river estuaries.

Orelle (French pronunciation: [ɔʁɛl]; Savoyard: Ozhèlo) is a commune in the Savoie department in the Auvergne-Rhône-Alpes region in south-eastern France.

It is connected by the longest télécabine in the world to Plan Bouchet, a skiing area that is part of the 3 vallées, the largest linked ski domain in the world. From there one can access the Val Thorens ski station.

== See also ==
- Communes of the Savoie department
