= Saint-Michel-de-Maurienne =

Saint-Michel-de-Maurienne Sin Mestyé (Savoyard)
- Commune
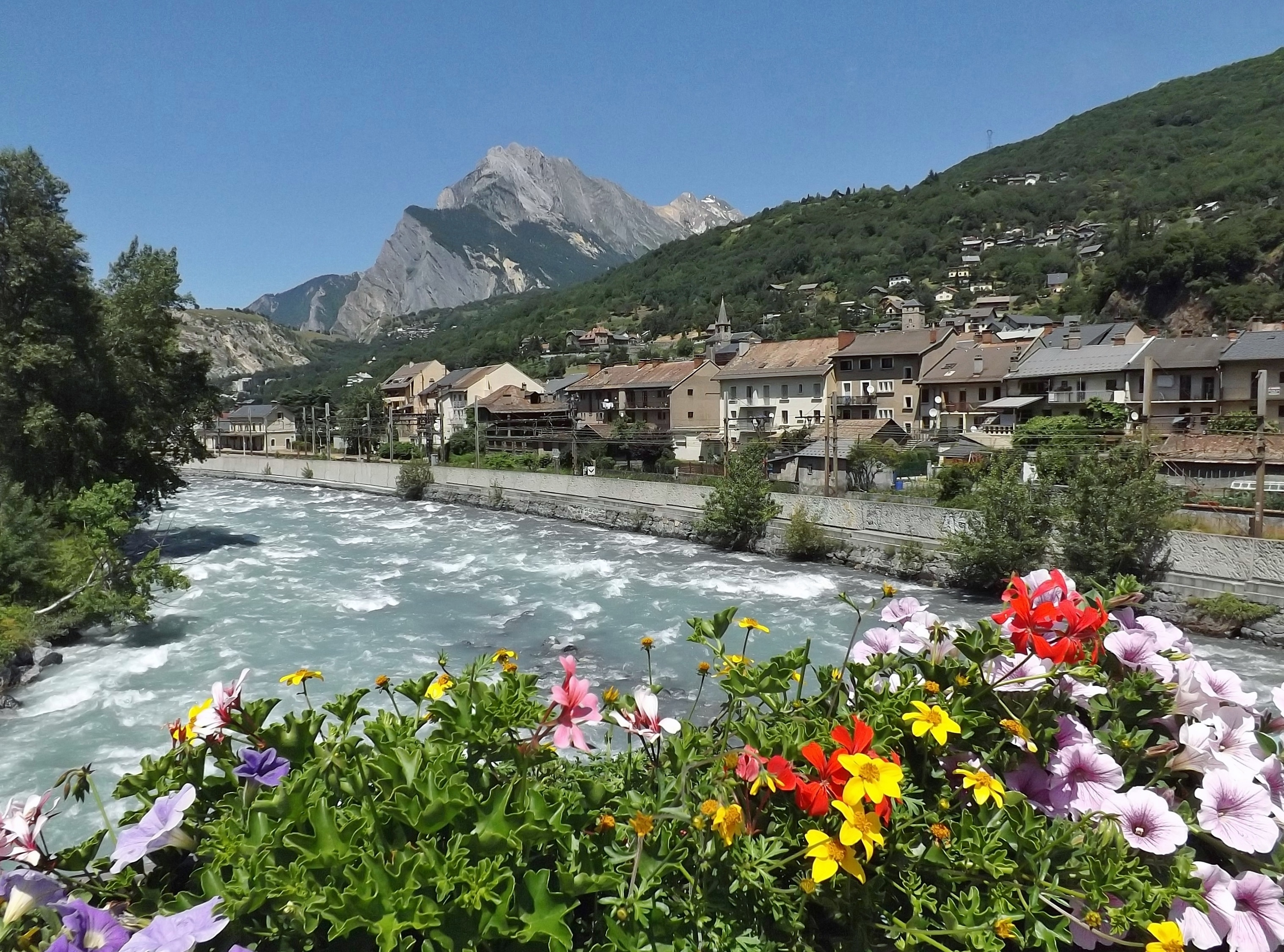
- The river Arc in Saint-Michel-de-Maurienne

- Coat of arms
- Location of Saint-Michel-de-Maurienne
- Location within France Location within Auvergne-Rhône-Alpes
- Coordinates: 45°13′07″N 6°28′27″E
- Country: France
- Region: Auvergne-Rhône-Alpes
- Department: Savoie
- Arrondissement: Saint-Jean-de-Maurienne
- Canton: Modane
- Intercommunality: Maurienne-Galibier

Government
  - Mayor (2020–2026): Gaetan Mancuso
- Area^{1}: 36.31 km^{2} (14.02 sq mi)
- Highest elevation: 3,130 m (10,270 ft)
- Lowest elevation: 698 m (2,290 ft)
- Population (2023): 2,395
  - Density: 65.96/km^{2} (170.8/sq mi)
- Time zone: UTC+01:00 (CET)
  - Summer (DST): UTC+02:00 (CEST)
- INSEE/Postal code: 73261 /73140
- Website: www.saint-michel-de-maurienne.com
- ^{1} French Land Register data, which excludes lakes, ponds, glaciers > 1 km^{2} (0.386 sq mi or 247 acres) and river estuaries.

Saint-Michel-de-Maurienne (French pronunciation: [sɛ̃ miʃɛl də mɔʁjɛn], literally Saint-Michel of Maurienne; Savoyard: Sin Mestyé) is a commune in the Savoie department in the Auvergne-Rhône-Alpes region in south-eastern France.

== Toponymy ==
Saint-Michel-de-Maurienne is mentioned in medieval documents under the forms Beati Michaelis in 1112, Sancti Michaelis in 1181, beati Michaelis de Mauriana in 1250, and sanctum Michaelem in Mauriana in 1328, as recorded in the Cartulaire de Maurienne. Other recorded forms include Sancto Michaele in 1200, Sancti Michaelis Mauriane in 1266, Villa Sanctis Michaelis Mauriane, Sancti Michaelis Mauriane in 1369, and Ville de Saint-Michel-de-Maurienne in 1561.

Canon Saturnin Truchet, in his Histoire de Maurienne, proposed that the mention of Magus in the testament of Abbo may correspond to the town of Saint-Michel.

The commune of Saint-Michel became Saint-Michel-de-Maurienne by decree of 13 May 1953.

The name combines the former name of the commune, Saint-Michel, with -Maurienne, referring to the Maurienne valley in which it is located. Saint-Michel refers to the archangel Michael.

In Arpitan, the name of the commune is written Sin Mestyé according to the Conflans orthography.

== History ==
=== Knights Templars and Hospitallers ===
The place name Le Temple recalls the former presence of a commandery of the Knights Templar. The surviving sources do not explain the precise origin of this house, since the donation documents have disappeared, but an early mention of it dates from 1181.

After the suppression of the Templar order, the Temple of Saint-Michel passed to the Hospitallers of the Order of Saint John. A land register of 1475 mentions Brother Michel Cochonis, around 1450, as rector of a hospital, under the Latin title Rector sacre domus Dei hospitalis Sancti Michaelis.

The house later appears as a dependent house of the commandery of Chambéry, together with Accoyeu, Thouvet, Allevard, Avalon, Mésage and Vizille, within the Langue of Auvergne. No visible remains of the Saint-Michel commandery survive; the site was occupied by a factory from 1919.

=== Contemporary period ===
The commune was the site of the Saint-Michel-de-Maurienne derailment in 1917, one of the deadliest railway accidents in French history. In August 1944, during the final phase of the Second World War, German forces carried out a massacre of hostages in the commune.

The former communes of Beaune and Le Thyl were attached to Saint-Michel-de-Maurienne by prefectural decree on 13 September 1972.

=== Industrial history ===
The Maurienne valley has been described as a “valley of aluminium”, and Saint-Michel-de-Maurienne occupied a central position between the aluminium sites of La Praz and Saint-Jean-de-Maurienne. In 1992, local heritage supporters proposed preserving the memory of this industrial history. The initiative was formalized by the municipality in 1999 and led to the opening in 2007 of the Espace Alu, a museum dedicated to aluminium production in the Alps.

The La Saussaz aluminium plant was founded in 1905, together with the hydroelectric power station of the same name. The power station used a diversion of the Arc and operated with a head of 74 m and an installed power of 17,500 kW. The plant later became part of Alais-Froges-et-Camargue, renamed Pechiney in 1950, and operated as an annex of the Saint-Jean-de-Maurienne works until its closure in 1985.

Another major industrial site was established at Le Temple by Louis Renault during the First World War. Construction began in 1917 and production started in 1919. The plant, supplied with hydroelectric power from the Châtelard power station on the Neuvache, was converted into a steelworks in 1925 and became known as the Aciéries du Temple. It played an important role in the local economy, employing more than 1,000 people in 1939.

From the late 1960s, the site was progressively converted away from steelmaking towards forge tooling, precision casting and cold forging. Steel production ended in 1977. After the privatisation of Renault, the former Aciéries du Temple passed through several owners. The precision foundry, later known as MT Technology, was placed in liquidation in 2016.

The closures of La Saussaz in 1985 and of the former Aciéries du Temple in 2016 marked the end of the commune's main industrial era. This decline is reflected in local demographic change: the agglomeration formed by Saint-Michel-de-Maurienne and Saint-Martin-d'Arc fell from 4,218 inhabitants in 1968 to 2,832 in 2015.

== Geography ==
=== Climate ===
Saint-Michel-de-Maurienne has an oceanic climate (Köppen climate classification Cfb). The station is located at an altitude of 700 m (2,300 ft); due to its location on a leeward slope, there is significantly less precipitation than nearby areas. It is quite common to exceed 30 °C (86 °F) in summer, sometimes the maximum temperature can reach 35 °C (95 °F), and in winter it is relatively rare to fall below −10 °C (14 °F). The average annual temperature in Saint-Michel-de-Maurienne is 11.0 °C (51.8 °F). The average annual rainfall is 754.3 mm (29.70 in) with December as the wettest month. The temperatures are highest on average in July, at around 20.3 °C (68.5 °F), and lowest in January, at around 1.3 °C (34.3 °F). The highest temperature ever recorded in Saint-Michel-de-Maurienne was 38.2 °C (100.8 °F) on 19 August 2012; the coldest temperature ever recorded was −16.6 °C (2.1 °F) on 5 February 2012.

Climate data for Saint-Michel-de-Maurienne (1991−2020 normals, extremes 1997−present)
Month	Jan	Feb	Mar	Apr	May	Jun	Jul	Aug	Sep	Oct	Nov	Dec	Year
Record high °C (°F)	17.8 (64.0)	22.8 (73.0)	26.4 (79.5)	27.8 (82.0)	32.8 (91.0)	37.2 (99.0)	38.0 (100.4)	38.2 (100.8)	31.6 (88.9)	29.5 (85.1)	22.4 (72.3)	18.5 (65.3)	38.2 (100.8)
Mean daily maximum °C (°F)	5.5 (41.9)	7.9 (46.2)	13.3 (55.9)	17.3 (63.1)	21.0 (69.8)	25.2 (77.4)	27.4 (81.3)	26.6 (79.9)	22.4 (72.3)	17.5 (63.5)	10.4 (50.7)	5.9 (42.6)	16.7 (62.1)
Daily mean °C (°F)	1.3 (34.3)	2.9 (37.2)	7.4 (45.3)	11.2 (52.2)	14.8 (58.6)	18.4 (65.1)	20.3 (68.5)	19.8 (67.6)	16.1 (61.0)	11.8 (53.2)	5.9 (42.6)	2.0 (35.6)	11.0 (51.8)
Mean daily minimum °C (°F)	−2.8 (27.0)	−2.1 (28.2)	1.5 (34.7)	5.1 (41.2)	8.6 (47.5)	11.7 (53.1)	13.3 (55.9)	12.9 (55.2)	9.8 (49.6)	6.1 (43.0)	1.5 (34.7)	−1.9 (28.6)	5.3 (41.5)
Record low °C (°F)	−14.9 (5.2)	−16.6 (2.1)	−12.3 (9.9)	−3.7 (25.3)	−0.6 (30.9)	1.3 (34.3)	6.2 (43.2)	4.0 (39.2)	0.3 (32.5)	−4.2 (24.4)	−10.5 (13.1)	−13.8 (7.2)	−16.6 (2.1)
Average precipitation mm (inches)	73.8 (2.91)	49.3 (1.94)	59.5 (2.34)	49.9 (1.96)	71.4 (2.81)	54.4 (2.14)	60.3 (2.37)	67.0 (2.64)	53.5 (2.11)	64.7 (2.55)	74.5 (2.93)	76.0 (2.99)	754.3 (29.70)
Average precipitation days (≥ 1.0 mm)	8.1	7.0	7.8	8.0	10.5	8.7	8.7	9.3	7.1	8.1	8.5	8.4	100.4
Source: Météo-France

== Population ==
Historical population
Year	Pop.	±% p.a.
1968	3,978	—
1975	3,743	−0.87%
1982	3,418	−1.29%
1990	2,919	−1.95%
1999	2,714	−0.81%
2007	2,770	+0.26%
2012	2,584	−1.38%
2017	2,461	−0.97%
2023	2,395	−0.45%
Source: INSEE

== See also ==
- Communes of the Savoie department
- Saint-Michel-de-Maurienne derailment
- Saint-Michel-Valloire station
- Château de Saint-Michel-de-Maurienne
