= Méribel Altiport =

Méribel Altiport Altiport de Méribel
- IATA: MFX; ICAO: LFKX

Summary
- Airport type: Public
- Owner: Méribel Air Club
- Operator: Méribel Air Club
- Serves: Méribel
- Location: Les Allues
- Elevation AMSL: 5,633 ft (1,717 m)
- Coordinates: 45°24′27″N 006°34′39″E
- Website: ac-meribel.com
- Interactive map of Méribel Altiport

Runways
Direction	Length		Surface
Direction	ft	m	Surface
15/33	1,332	406	Paved

Méribel Altiport (French: Altiport de Méribel) (IATA: MFX, ICAO: LFKX), is an altiport in Les Allues, a commune in Savoie, France.

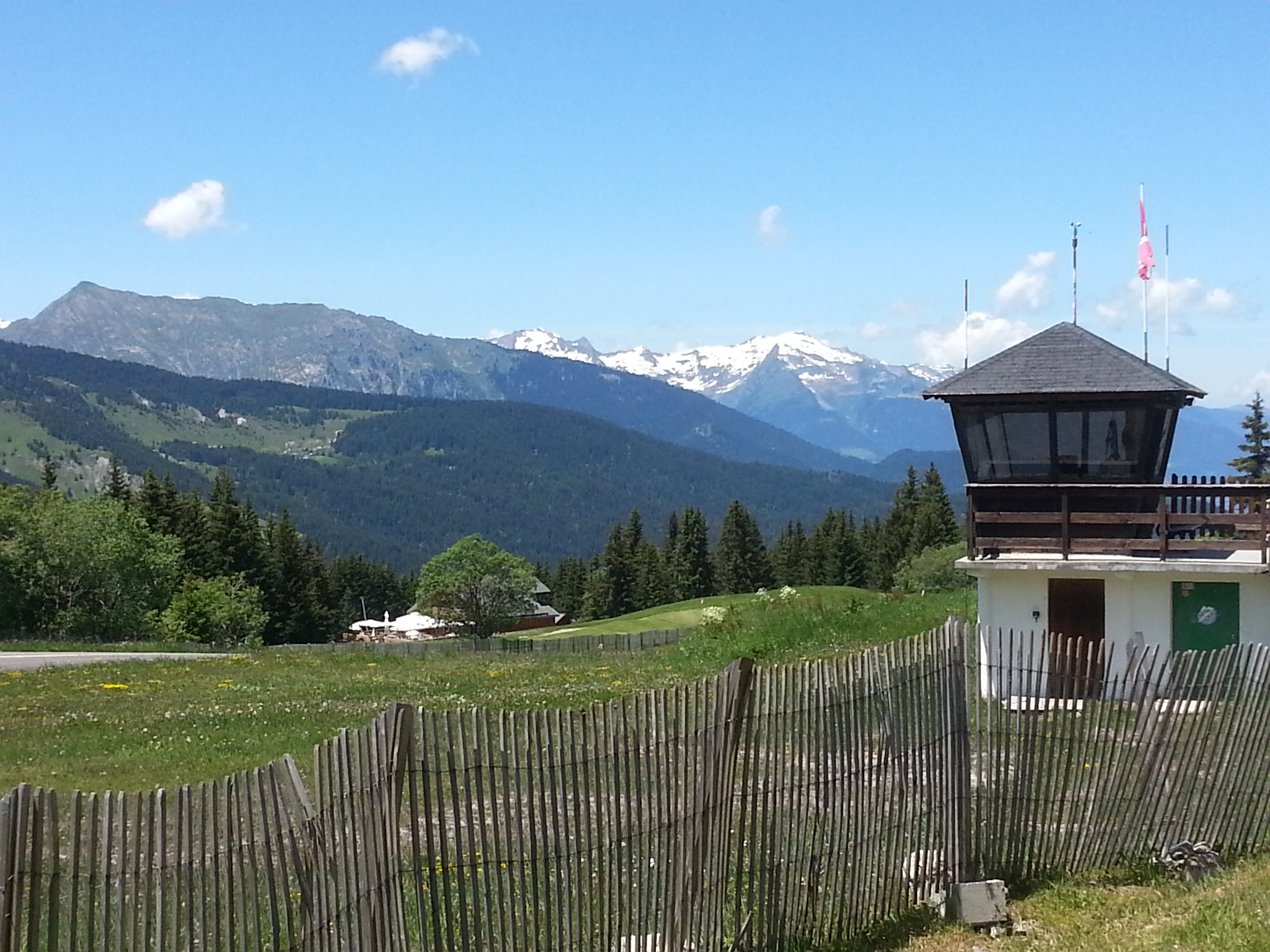
Meribel altiport and its tower

It is used for the practice of leisure and tourism activities (light aviation and helicopter).

It is an altiport (an airfield located in the mountains with the runway at a significant slope, i.e. not horizontal, forcing aircraft to land uphill and take off downhill) involving dangerous terrain and thus, requires special formal training in order to conduct landings and takeoffs.

== History ==
The Altiport of Méribel was inaugurated on January 29, 1962 by Joseph Szydlowski, President of Turboméca, and Michel Ziegler, the son of Henri Ziegler. The word "altiport" was imagined during this event[2]. This altiport was the place of the first landing in a winter sports resort in France on January 30, 1962[2], the day before the first landing at the Altiport of Courchevel. The history of this altiport is strongly linked to the airline Air Alpes.

== Facilities ==
The altiport has an asphalt runway facing south-north (15/33), 406 meters long and 15 meters wide. Its altitude is 1,691 meters (5,548ft) at the threshold and 1,719 meters (5,639ft) at the top. The average slope of the central part is 11%.

The altiport is not controlled. Communications are made in self-information on the frequency of 118.755 MHz[3].

== Activities ==
Meribel Air Club
