= Les Allues =

Les Allues Los Alués (Arpitan)
- Commune
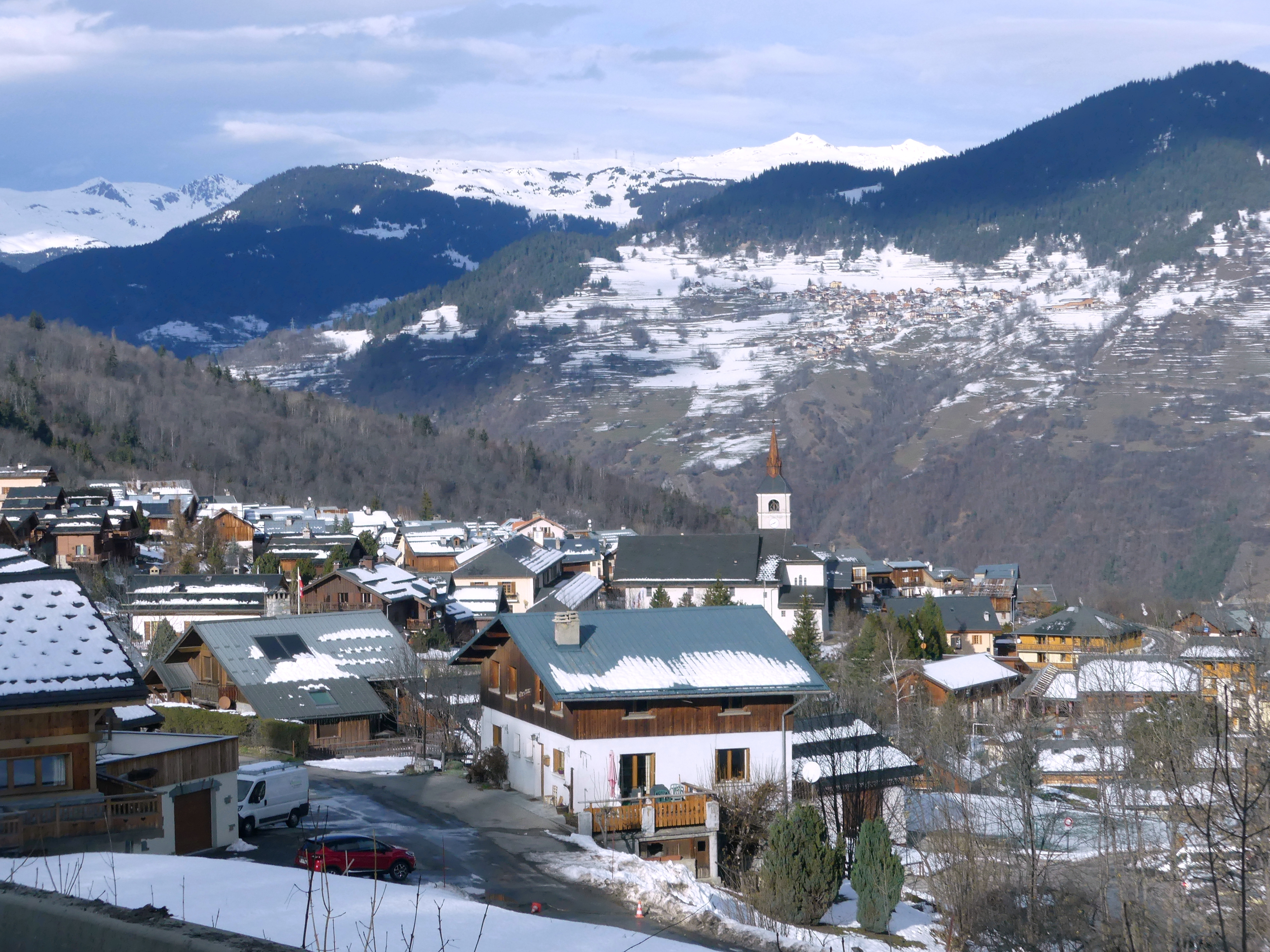
- Les Allues in winter
- Location of Les Allues
- Location within France Location within Auvergne-Rhône-Alpes
- Coordinates: 45°25′54″N 6°33′24″E
- Country: France
- Region: Auvergne-Rhône-Alpes
- Department: Savoie
- Arrondissement: Albertville
- Canton: Moûtiers

Government
  - Mayor (2020–2026): Thierry Monin
- Area^{1}: 85.99 km^{2} (33.20 sq mi)
- Elevation: 1,125 m (3,691 ft)
- Highest elevation: 3,564 m (11,693 ft)
- Lowest elevation: 680 m (2,230 ft)
- Population (2023): 1,736
  - Density: 20.19/km^{2} (52.29/sq mi)
- Time zone: UTC+01:00 (CET)
  - Summer (DST): UTC+02:00 (CEST)
- INSEE/Postal code: 73015 /73550
- ^{1} French Land Register data, which excludes lakes, ponds, glaciers > 1 km^{2} (0.386 sq mi or 247 acres) and river estuaries.

Les Allues (French pronunciation: [le.z‿aly]; Savoyard Arpitan: Los Alués) is a commune in the Savoie department in the Auvergne-Rhône-Alpes region in Southeastern France. As of 2023, the population of the commune was 1,736. Les Allues is best known for containing the Méribel ski resort and its surrounding Méribel les Allues area; the southernmost part of the commune is covered by Vanoise National Park.

== Geography ==
The town of Les Allues, after which the commune is named and in which the town hall is located, is situated in the Allues Valley at 1,100 m (3,608 ft). The town has a rich history and holds various events annually to celebrate different parts of this history.

At the historic centre of the town is the Place du Four (oven), a huge oven used to make bread for the locals on certain occasions. Around the Place du Four are various buildings dating from when the town was first built. These include Chalet Symphonie and La Vallée Blanche.

== See also ==
- Communes of the Savoie department
