= Les Arcs =

Ski resort

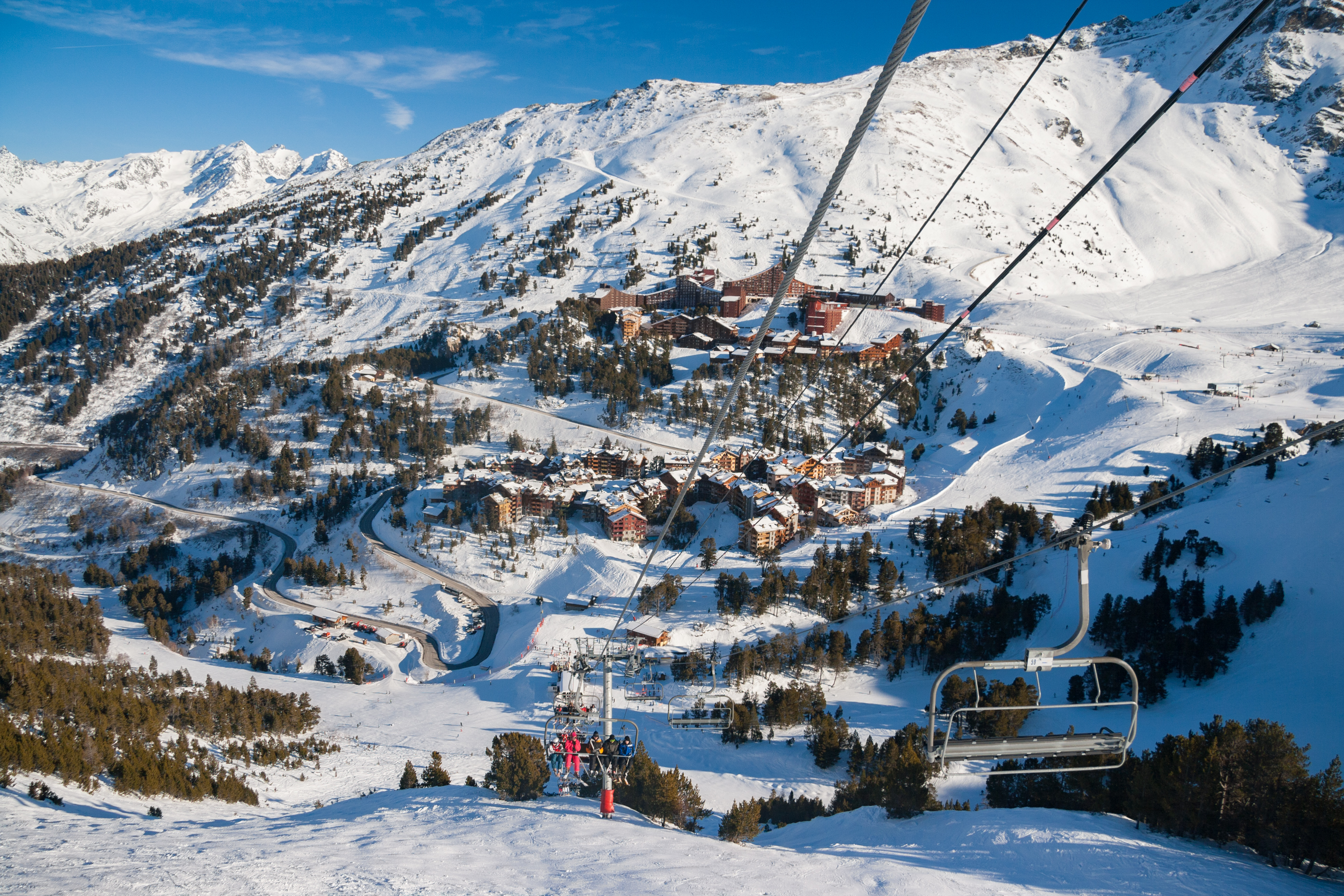

- Location within France Location within Auvergne-Rhône-Alpes Location within Alps
- Location: Bourg-Saint-Maurice, Savoie, France
- Coordinates: 45°34′18″N 6°48′28″E
- Top elevation: 3,250 m (10,660 ft)
- Base elevation: 1,250 m (4,100 ft)
- Trails: 237 (easy: 136; intermediate: 66; difficult: 35) + "Nature" runs
- Longest run: 10 km (6.2 mi) (2,100 m (6,890 ft) vertical drop)
- Total length: 425 km (264 mi)
- Lift system: 171 (1 funicular, 15 cable cars/gondolas, 62 chair lifts, 93 surface lifts)
- Terrain parks: 9
- Snowmaking: 470 cannons
- Website: www.lesarcs.com

Les Arcs (French pronunciation: [le.z‿aʁk]) is a ski resort located in Savoie, France, in the Tarentaise Valley town of Bourg-Saint-Maurice. Initially created by Robert Blanc and Roger Godino, it is a part of the huge Paradiski system which is under ownership by Compagnie des Alpes, a French-listed company owning several other ski resorts as well as theme parks.

== The skiing ==
The five areas—Bourg-Saint-Maurice, Arc 1600, Arc 1800, Arc 1950, and Arc 2000—are situated at an altitude spanning from 810 to 3226 metres, although skiing is mostly possible above 1200 metres. The ski area consists of 106 runs, 54 lifts, and 200 kilometres of descent. The highest peak in the resort is the Aiguille Rouge (Red Needle) from where is a 7 km long piste with 2026 metres in vertical drop down to the Village Villaroger. Since the opening of the Vanoise Express cable car in December 2003, Les Arcs has become part of the Paradiski group of ski-connected resorts, which also includes the La Plagne area. Paradiski in total has 425 km of pistes.

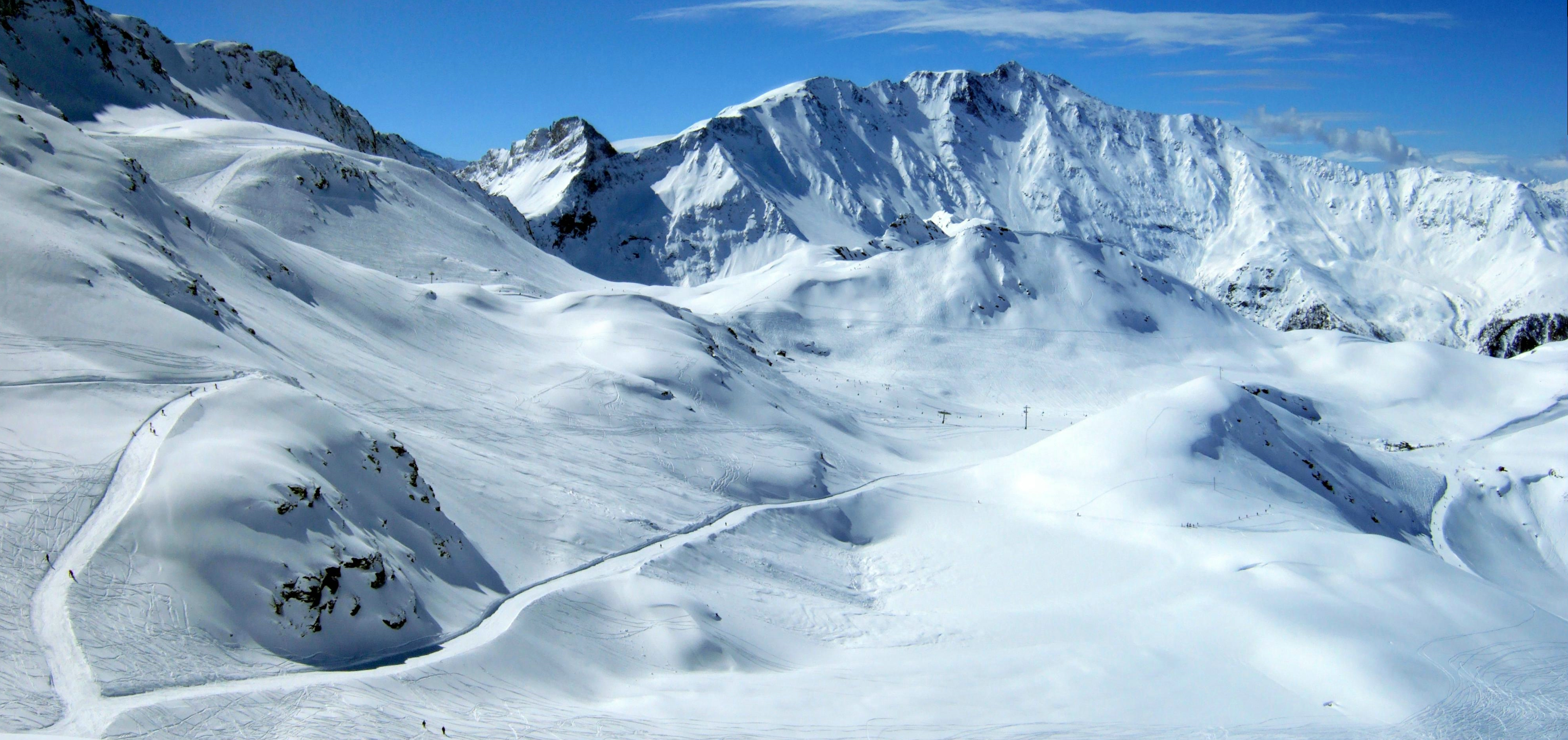
From the base of the gondola up to the Aiguille Rouge, at 2670 m. To the right is the Bellecôte.

Les Arcs is described as one of the original French "mega-resorts", which feature networks of pistes. Les Arcs features modernist architecture designated as "heritage of the 20th century". Most of its resorts are built following this modernist architecture, with the exception of Arc 1950, which is built in an Alpine style.

The ski domain provides a mixture of open runs (especially above Arc 2000) and wooded runs (around the outlying villages of Peisey and Villaroger in particular). Its terrain park has a good reputation, with green, red, and black jumps and rails. It is also good for snowboarders, with few drag lifts. The ski lifts have been gradually updated so virtually all critical lifts are modern, fast, and comfortable.

Modelled on the accelerated progress of the Sophringham Method, Les Arcs' ESF ski school teaches ski evolutif; students are taught parallel turns from the beginning, but on very short skis (that get progressively longer through the first week). Les Arcs is regarded as having excellent beginner ski areas in each resort, although absolute beginners have little to progress to; away from the nursery slopes things get trickier. Les Arcs is also regarded by many as the home of snowboarding in Europe. Local instructor Régis Rolland popularized the snowboard in France with the Apocalypse Snow series of films made in the resort in the early 1980s.

The ski area of Arc 2000 and 1950 consists of a broad valley, with these two resorts at the bottom of its broader part. One of the sides of the valley is the ridge with the area's highest point, the Aiguille Rouge. The other side is a ridge to Arc 1600, 1800, and Peisey-Vallandry, which hold a wide range of runs. There are also a lot of relatively safe off-piste possibilities available in addition to those where a skier would require a mountain guide.

In Arc 2000 is the famous speed skiing course used in the 1992 Olympics (speed skiing at the 1992 Winter Olympics). It is 2000 metres long with an additional 700 metres for stopping.

== History ==
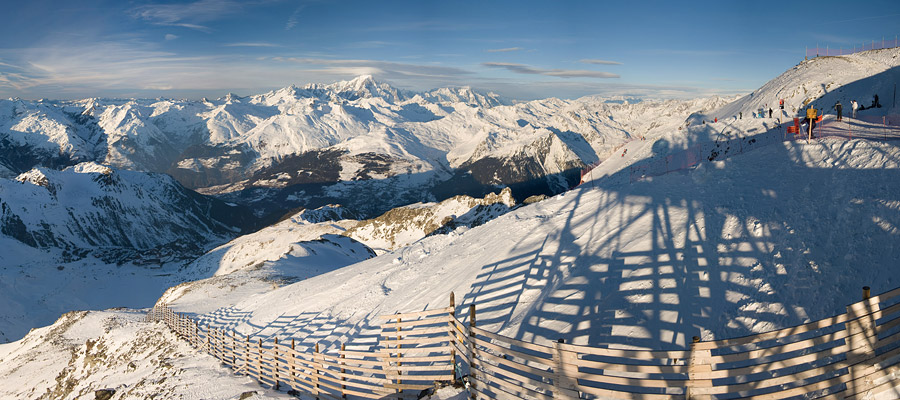
View of Mont Blanc from Aiguille Rouge

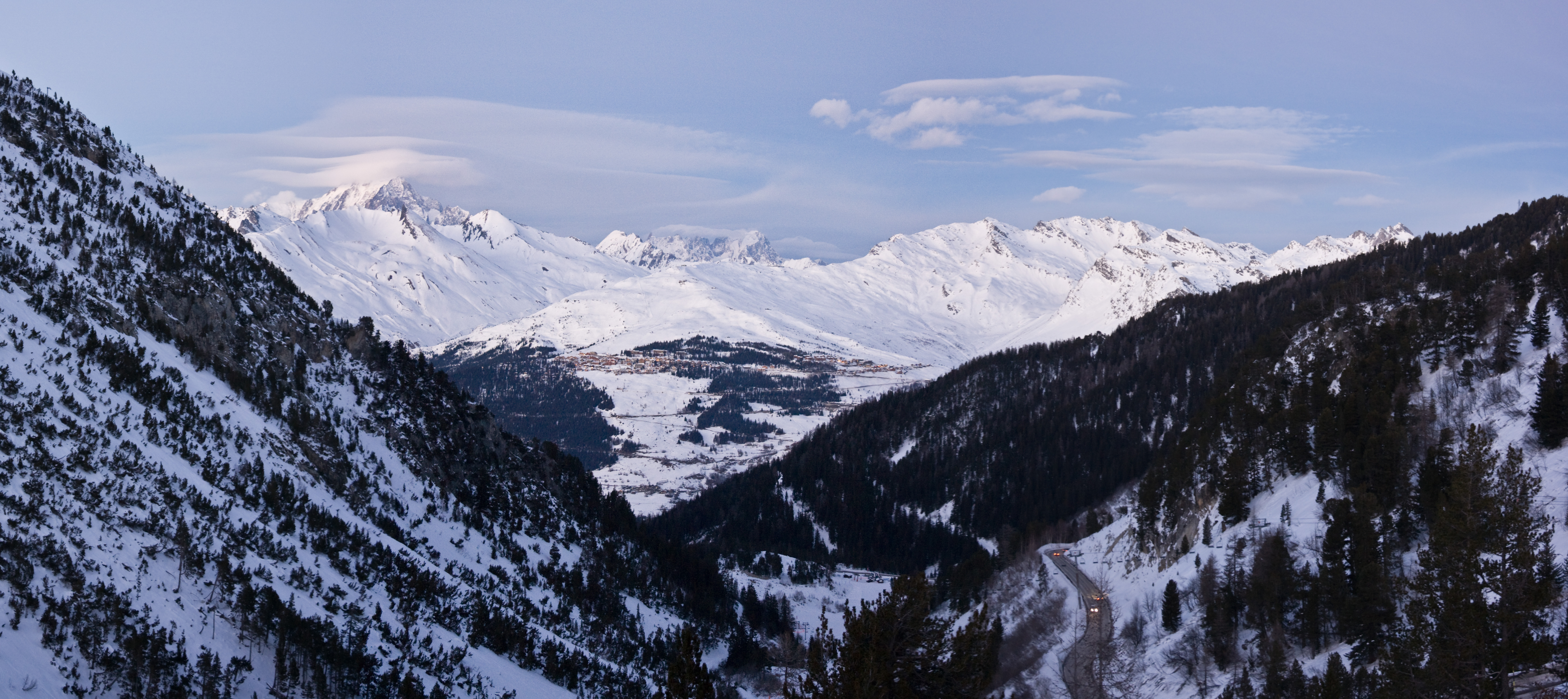
View of Mont Blanc from Arcs 1950

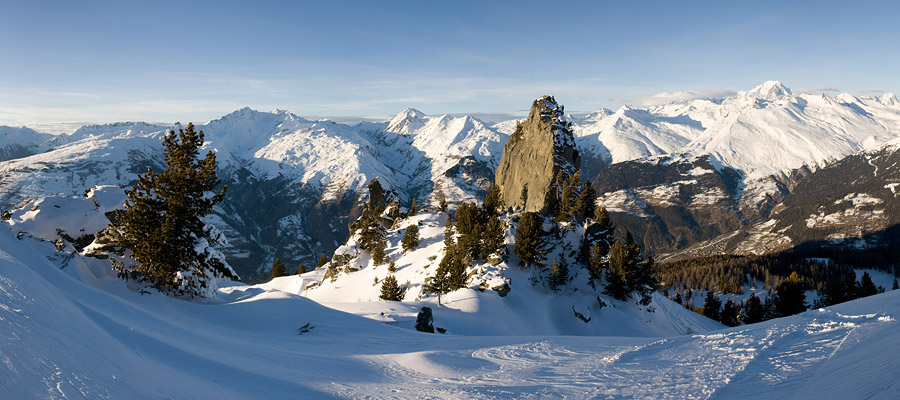
The stone near/above Arcs 1600

=== Creation of les Arcs ===
- 1968: Arc 1600 resort opening.
- 1974: Arc 1800 resort opening with the inauguration of the Hotel du Golf.
- 1979: Arc 2000 resort opening with the Club Med.
- 2003: Inauguration of the first tourist residences in Arc 1950. The village was completed 2008.

Thanks to a collaboration in the early 60s between Roger Godino, developer and constructor in mountain tourism, and Robert Blanc, born in the area and a ski instructor and high mountain guide, Les Arcs took shape with the help of engineers, architects, and town planners.

Three fundamental rules were followed in order to create a functional and aesthetic construction in keeping with the tourist development of that time:

- Respect for the area and the natural surroundings
- The conservation of existing old mountain chalets which were not to be copied for more authenticity
- The use of local material

Les Arcs is completely integrated into the mountain setting and distinguished by an exterior architecture avoiding buildings overlooking one another and by an interior open-plan concept (open kitchen, large picture windows, and raised balconies) which paved the way for a new style of living.

=== 20th century label ===
In 1999, the Ministry for the Arts and Communications introduced new policies in favour of the architectural and urban heritage of the 20th century: protection, public awareness, and restoration. Living proof of modernity working hand in hand with the mountains and nature, Les Arcs town planning is being studied by the Grenoble School of Architecture.

=== Charlotte Perriand ===
Charlotte Perriand designed and built Arc 1600, Arc 1800, and Arc 2000. She led the Les Arcs design team that included Roger Godino, Robert Blanc, Gaston Regairaz, Guy Rey-Millet, and Bernard Taillefer. She designed the resorts to have minimal rooms, with the idea that most guests spend their time outside. Instead the buildings have great rooms that are open to the sun and nature.

== Resort areas ==
=== Arc 1600 (also Arc Pierre Blanche) ===
At 1600 metres, this is the lowest of the resort areas and is linked directly to the Bourg Saint Maurice TGV train station by the "Arc en Ciel" funicular railway that was installed in 1986. The journey time is approximately 7 minutes and many trains also call at two intermediate stations, serving the villages of Montrigron and Les Granges. It is connected to the other villages by regular free shuttle buses and ski lifts. Arc 1600 was the first area to be built on and is referred to as "Arc Pierre Blanche". Arc 1600 now has 30 shops, hotels and meeting rooms to offer its guests.

=== Arc 1800 ===
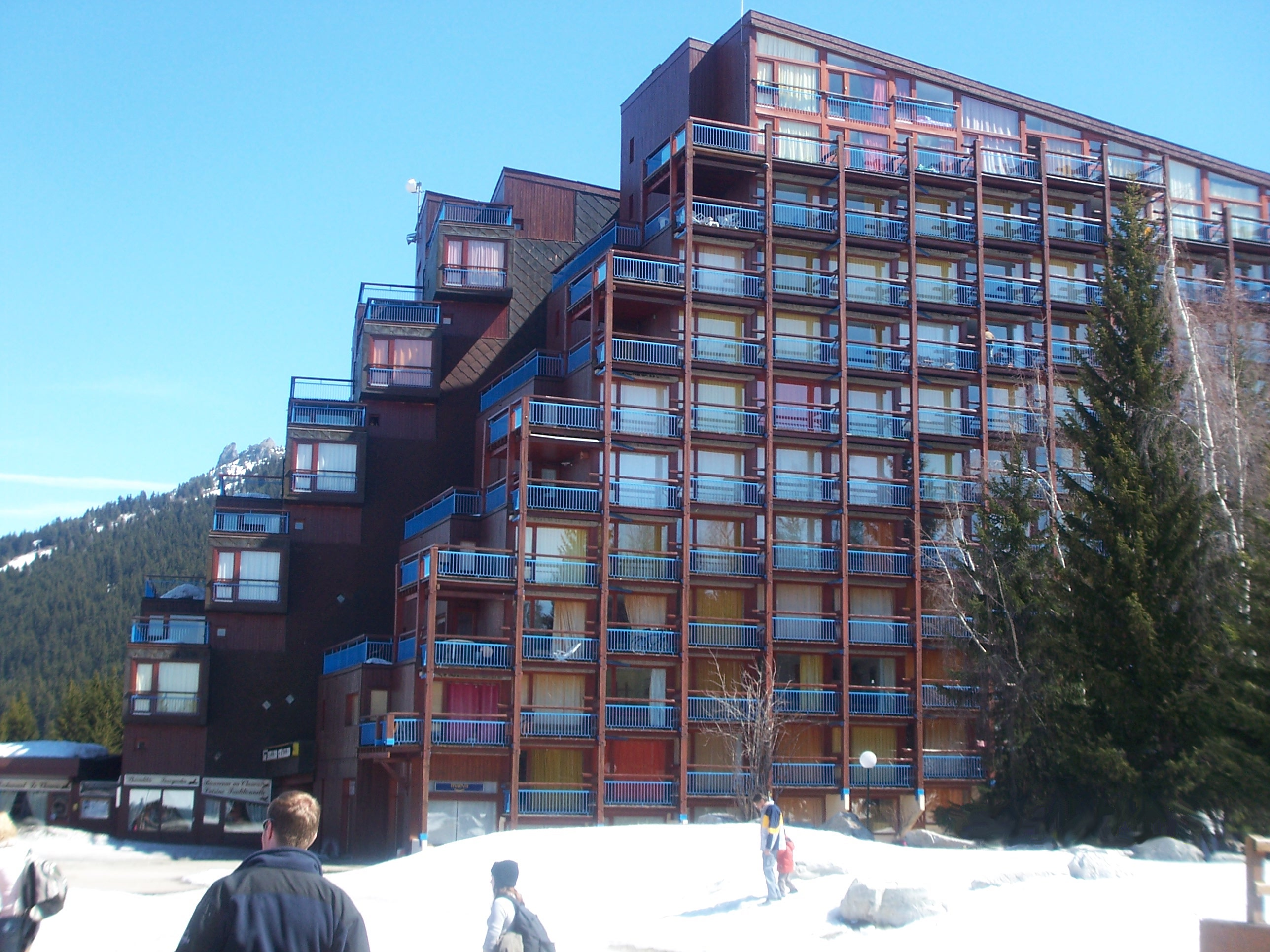
An example of modernist apartments at Les Arcs 1800 by architect Charlotte Perriand

Arc 1800 is the biggest of the resort areas and consists of four "villages" known as "Charvet", "Villards", "Charmettoger", and "Chantel". It has around 100 shops, shuttle services, hotels, meeting rooms, a two-screen cinema and an ice rink. There is a good selection of restaurants catering to most tastes including Casa Mia, voted resort restaurant of the year 2003 in a worldwide competition. The village has previously hosted the snowboarding and dance music snowbombing event.

The village is at a convenient position on the mountain, just above the resort of Arc 1600, and given its altitude comfortably above the snow line for the entire winter. The "TransArc" gondola reaches the top of the Arc 2000 valley quickly (queues notwithstanding), and there is a good selection of ski lifts, such as the six-seater Vagere, to take skiers to the various parts of the mountain.

Arc 1800 occasionally has the benefit of better weather conditions, given the topography of the mountain. When heavy snow falls at Arc 2000, it can be closed down and can also be at the mercy of heavy winds funnelling down to the valley. This is not a problem for Arc 1800, which is also west facing and thus benefits from sunshine in the afternoon. Above Arc 1800 are the apartments of Les Alpages du Chantel. The residence houses 182 apartments in two 3–5 storey chalet-style residences that offer a ski-in, ski-out experience. Also on site is a local shop and a locally themed restaurant, Les Alpages.

This area is linked to the La Plagne resort by the Vanoise Express cable car, departing from the village of Peisey.

=== Arc 1950 ===
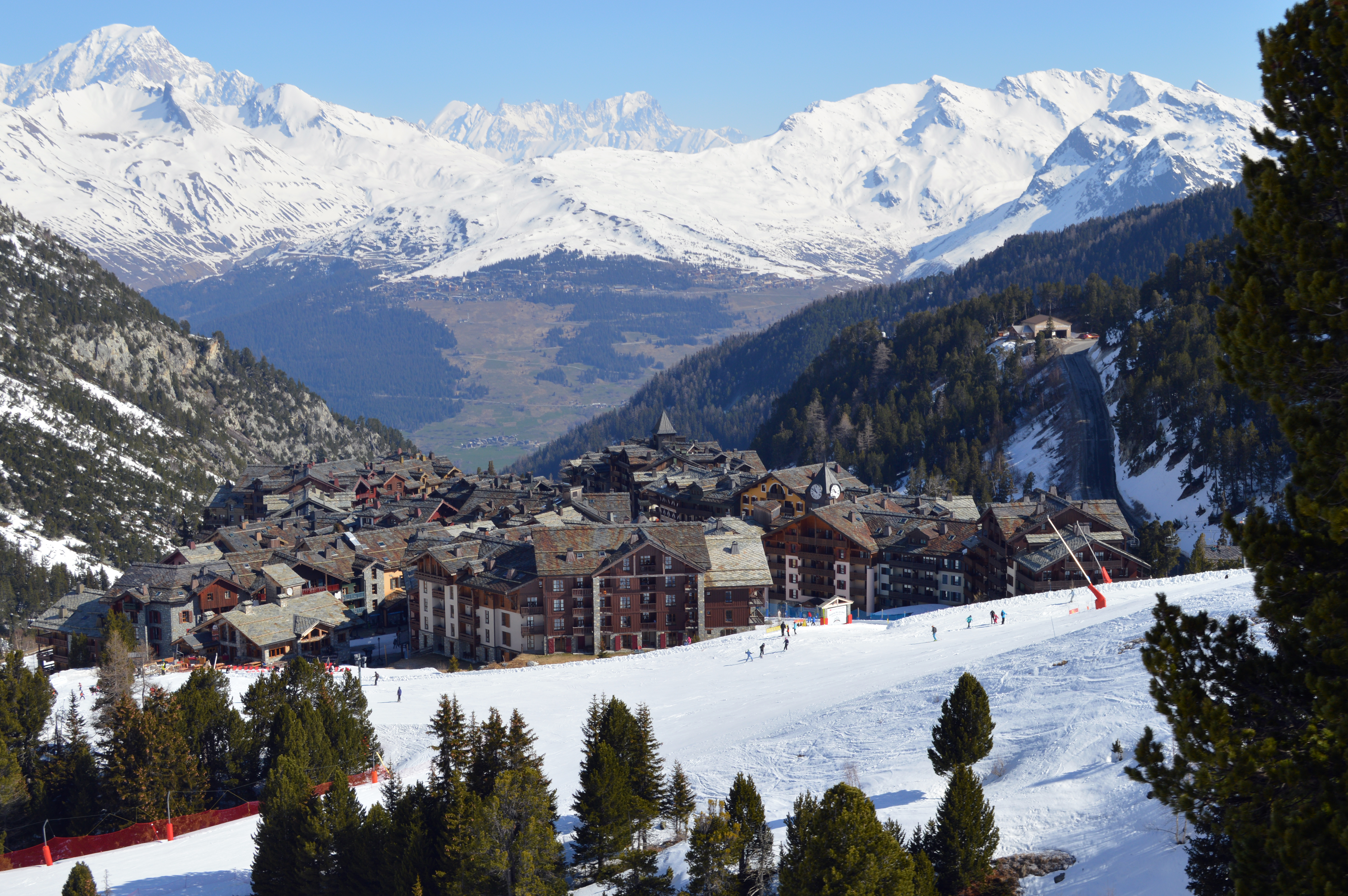
View of Arc 1950

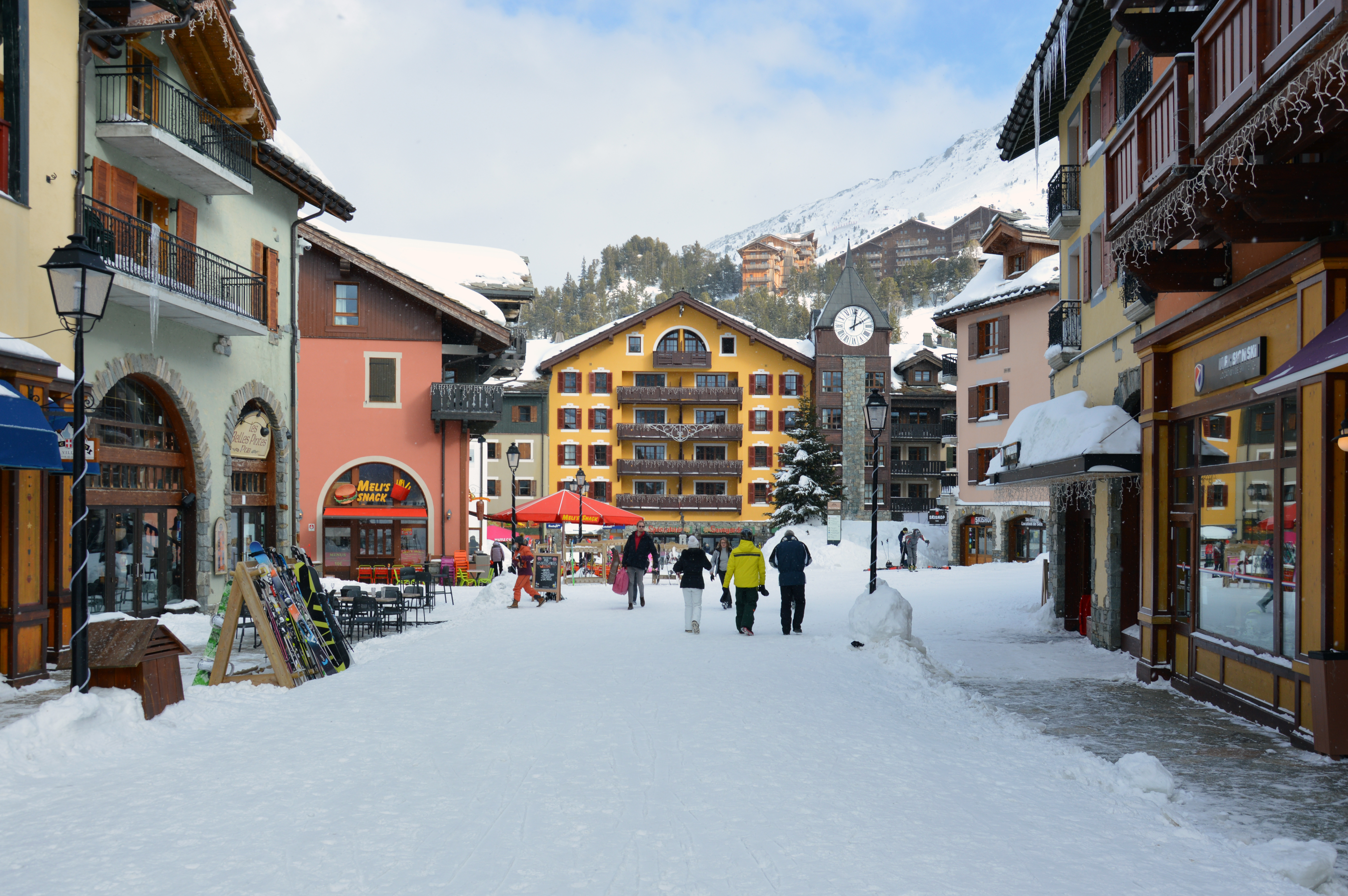
Main street of Arc 1950

Arc 1950 (Le Village) is a recent five-star alpine village development by the Canadian ski resort developer Intrawest, which also developed such resorts as Whistler and Mont Tremblant in Canada. It is situated at ~2000 m, offering almost guaranteed skiing during the winter, and is linked to Arc 2000 by a free pedestrian accessible gondola, Cabriolet. The architecture of Arc 1950 is striking as it clearly moves away from the standard concrete blocks of the mega resorts of the period. Instead it is lavishly fitted out and heavily influenced by the local Alpine history and architecture. 1950 has several commercial, apartment, and hotel buildings of different sizes, colours, and shapes. It has a wide variety of shops and, for a mountain resort, a huge variety of eateries including Italian, Mexican, French, Savoyarde, creperie, and American restaurants. It also has pubs, wine bars, lounges, and a nightclub. In 2012 the village was completed with the opening of a 1,000 m^{2} Deep Nature Spa, offering treatments and many relaxation rooms. The village is completely "ski in–ski out" and the hotels and apartments have by far the highest standard and comfort level in Les Arcs, even compared to the vast majority of the French ski resorts (1950 was voted "the best place to stay in the Alps" by the Ski Club of Great Britain in 2007). Intrawest sold the lodging operation in October 2009 to Pierre & Vacances, which is creating a new "Premium" brand with Arc 1950 taking a lead. In addition Radisson Blu have Arc 1950 as their Premium ski resort.

All apartments are privately owned and are operated by their owners directly or P&V Premium and Radisson. A majority of owners at 1950 are part of the Arc 1950 Owners' Association.

Arcs 1950 and 2000 have virtually the same access to the mountain. Given the altitude this is the most snow-safe part (also in terms of quality of the snow) of Les Arcs and also presents numerous "powder" opportunities after a snowfall.

=== Arc 2000 ===
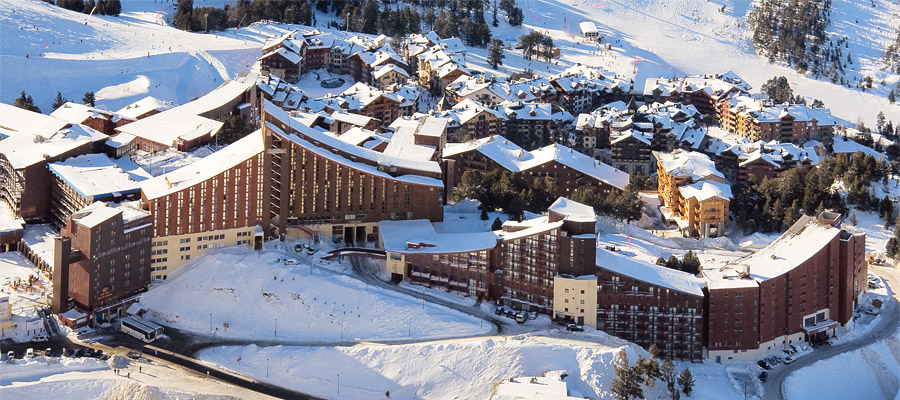
Les Arcs 2000 (in front) and 1950 (4-floor houses behind) from Aiguille Rouge

With a cable to 1950 and free shuttle buses to all of the other villages, Les Arcs' highest station has numerous transport links. It has a wide selection of shops, a cinema screen and meeting facilities. Being the highest it often has the best snow, although the nursery slopes above 2000 have a reputation for being crowded, and there are not so many tree-lined pistes for when the weather gets bad. The Varet gondola is a quick way to get up to the higher parts of the resort and there is also a new selection of six-seater chairlifts including Arcabulle, Bois de l'ors, and Marmottes to quickly ship skiers to the different sides of the mountain. Arc 2000 is well known for hosting speed skiing and other events over the course of the season.

=== Other villages ===
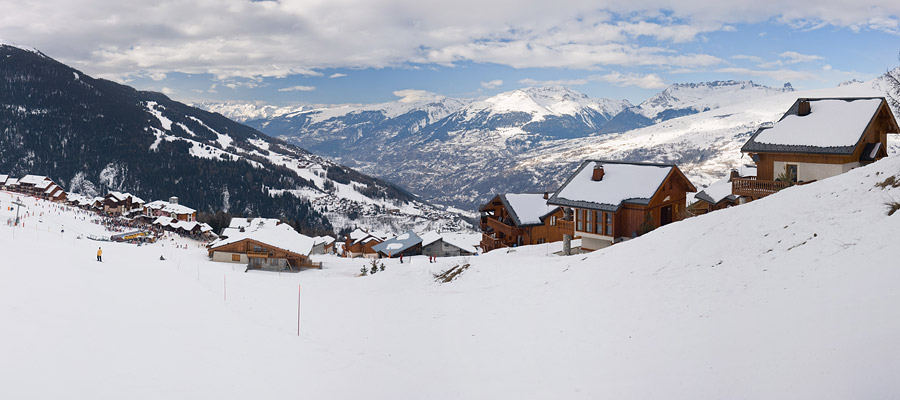
Vallandry and Plan-Peisey

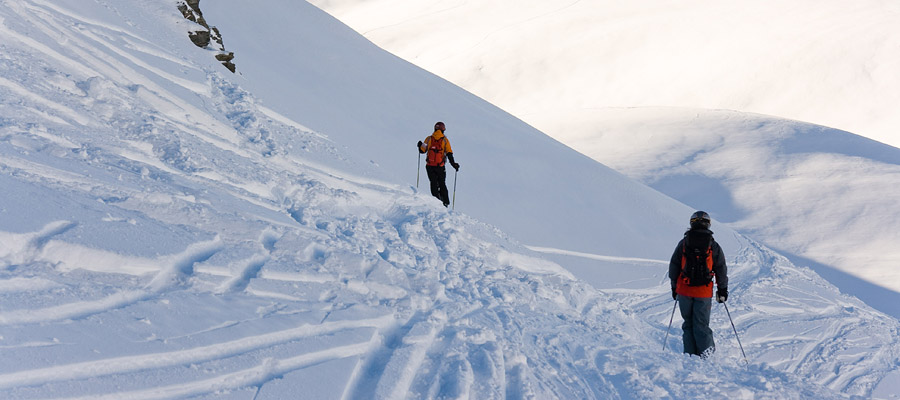

At one end of the ski area are the villages of Vallandry, Peisey, and Plan-Peisey, from which the Vanoise Express cable-car departs (to La Plagne, the other half of the Paradiski huge ski domain).

At the other end, across the valley from Sainte-Foy-Tarentaise, are the villages of Le Pre and Villaroger. A continuous run with 2,100-metre (6,900 ft) vertical drop links Aiguille Rouge to Le Pre, and although rather low at 1,200 metres (3,900 ft) Villaroger can be reached for most of the season given artificial snow and that it is north facing. Administratively these villages are not part of the Les Arcs ski domain, but are seamlessly linked. Their ski area is largely wooded, but with some open slopes above. This can provide especially good skiing when fresh snow has fallen or a welcome relief when the weather is windy or bad. Three lifts take skiers back from Villaroger into the 2000 bowl. In high winds, the top lift may be shut, making this side inaccessible except to those on the Villaroger side.

=== Tarentaise Valley ===
Within the Tarentaise Valley can be found the biggest concentration of world-class ski resorts in the world. The most well known neighbour systems are Espace Killy (Val d'Isère and Tignes), Les Trois Vallées (Courchevel, Méribel, Val Thorens), Sainte Foy, and La Rosiere (which connects to the Italian resort of La Thuile). A weekly lift ticket in Les Arcs/Paradiski gives skiers a choice to ski one day in each of the other systems mentioned either for free or for a reduced rate of 15 euros. There were once plans to interlink all systems and resorts to create the—by far—largest ski area in the world. However that vision was ended with the creation of the Vanoise National Park.

== Off-piste opportunities ==
The piste network in Les Arcs is fairly dense, and off-piste opportunities are numerous. With a guide, though, some big adventures are possible. Particularly recommended are off the back of the Aiguille Rouge down to Villaroger, or off the back of the Bellecote glacier (from La Plagne) down to Nancroix valley, just below Peisey, which is linked by free shuttle bus. It is advised that both routes be only attempted with a guide and appropriate avalanche equipment. Off-piste routes from Tignes to the Les Arcs area are also possible. The book Les clés de Paradiski by Didier Givois (in French but with summaries in English) includes very good descriptions of the possibilities.

== Mountain biking ==
Mountain biking is growing in popularity during the summer months, and certain parts of the lift network remain open to facilitate the sport during July and August. There are currently 22 marked VTT trails in operation that are detailed on the summer piste map. There are several mountain bike holiday companies that provide transport and accommodation in the resort for tourists. Arc 1950 has also been in the route of the Tour de France in previous years.

== The European film festival ==
The European festival of les Arcs (Festival de Cinéma Européen des Arcs) is a film festival dedicated to independent European cinema, founded in 2009. It takes place every year in December, during the opening week of the ski season, in Les Arcs ski resort located in Bourg-Saint-Maurice in Savoie.

The aim of this festival is to promote European cinema in all its diversity by showing independent European films that are very few exported outside their borders and to work towards the structuring of a European film market through the holding of professional meetings bringing together main players in the European film industry.

== Media ==
- Location of Force Majeure (Swedish: Turist), a 2014 Swedish drama film directed by Ruben Östlund.
