= La Plagne =

Ski resort in Savoie, France

Coordinates: 45.5064°N 6.67722°E

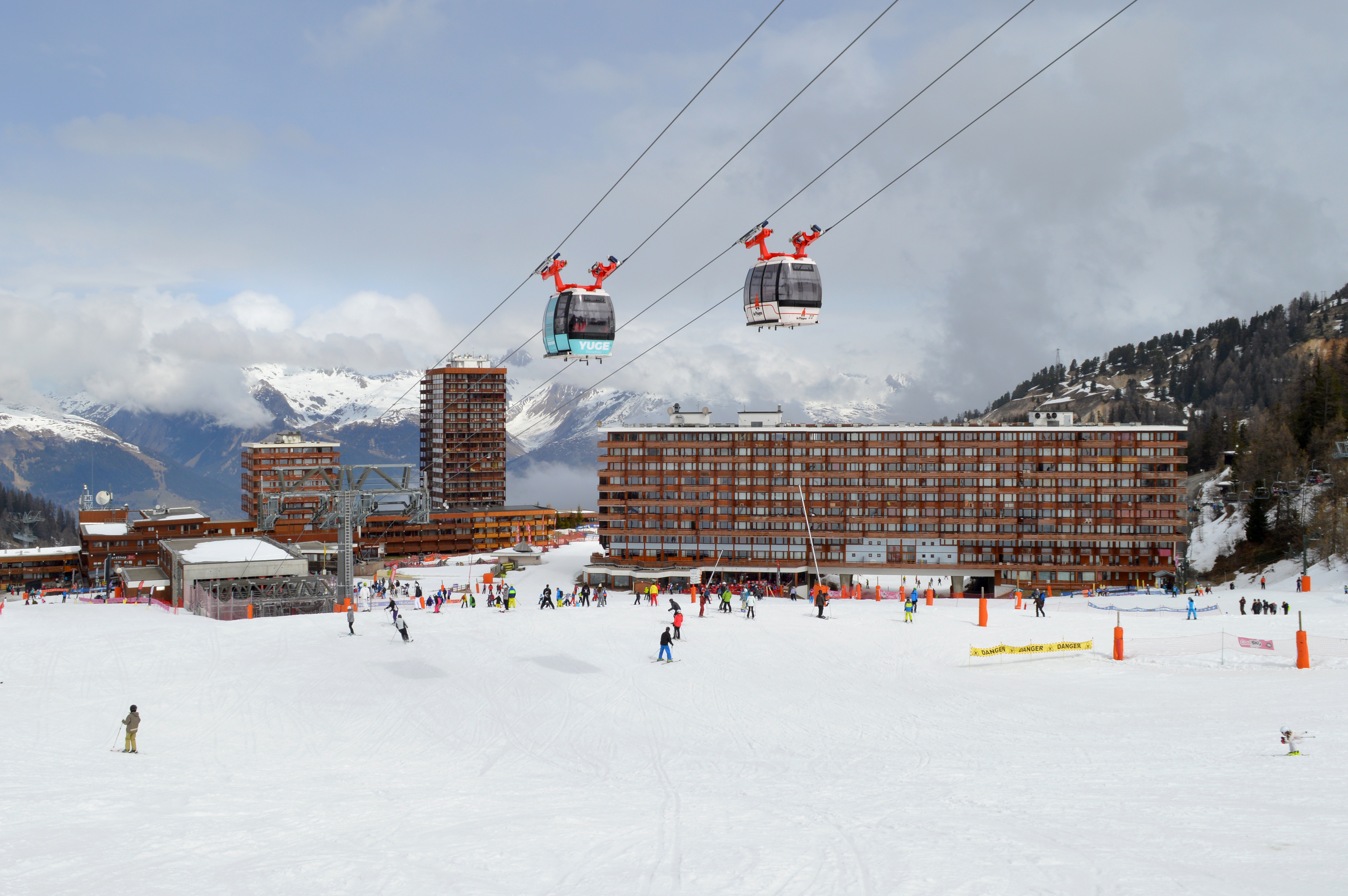
- Plagne Centre, 2017

- Location within France Location within Auvergne-Rhône-Alpes Location within Alps
- Location: Tarentaise Valley, Savoie, Rhône-Alpes, France
- Nearest city: Chambéry
- Status: Operating
- Owner: Compagnie des Alpes
- Top elevation: 3,250 m (10,660 ft)
- Base elevation: 1,250 m (4,100 ft)
- Skiable area: 100 km^{2} (39 sq mi)
- Snowmaking: Yes
- Night skiing: Yes
- Website: www.la-plagne.com

La Plagne (French pronunciation: [la plaɲ]) is a French ski area in the alpine valley of the Tarentaise (Savoie). Since 2003, La Plagne and the neighbouring resorts of Les Arcs and Peisey-Vallandry, all connected by Vanoise Express aerial cablecar, form the Paradiski ski area. It is currently owned by Compagnie des Alpes.

some of the 11 villages that make up the resort are not only miles apart but in different valleys

In 2014, La Plagne was named the most popular ski resort in the world with more than 2.5 million visitors a season on average.

== Ski area ==
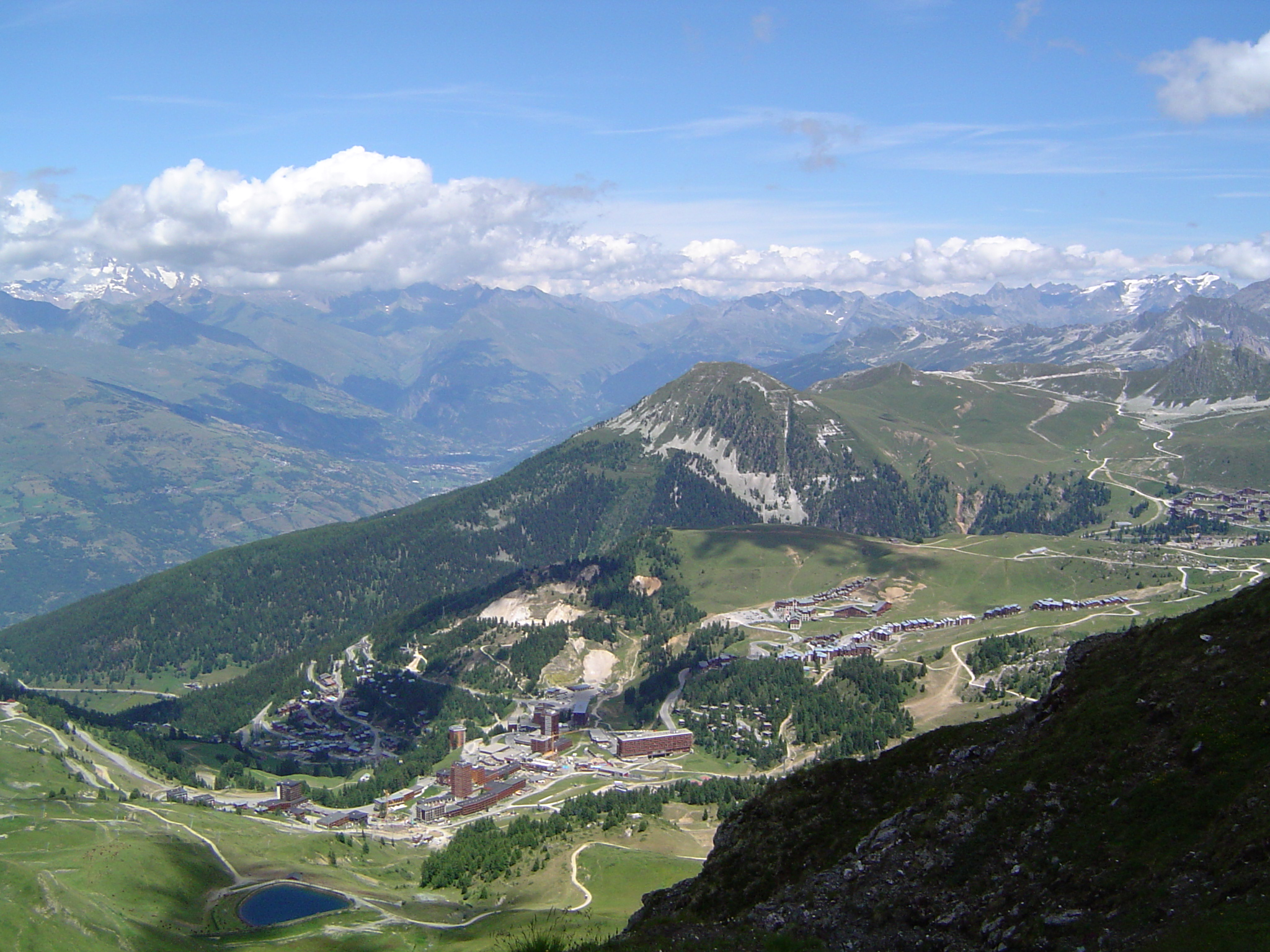
La Plagne in summer

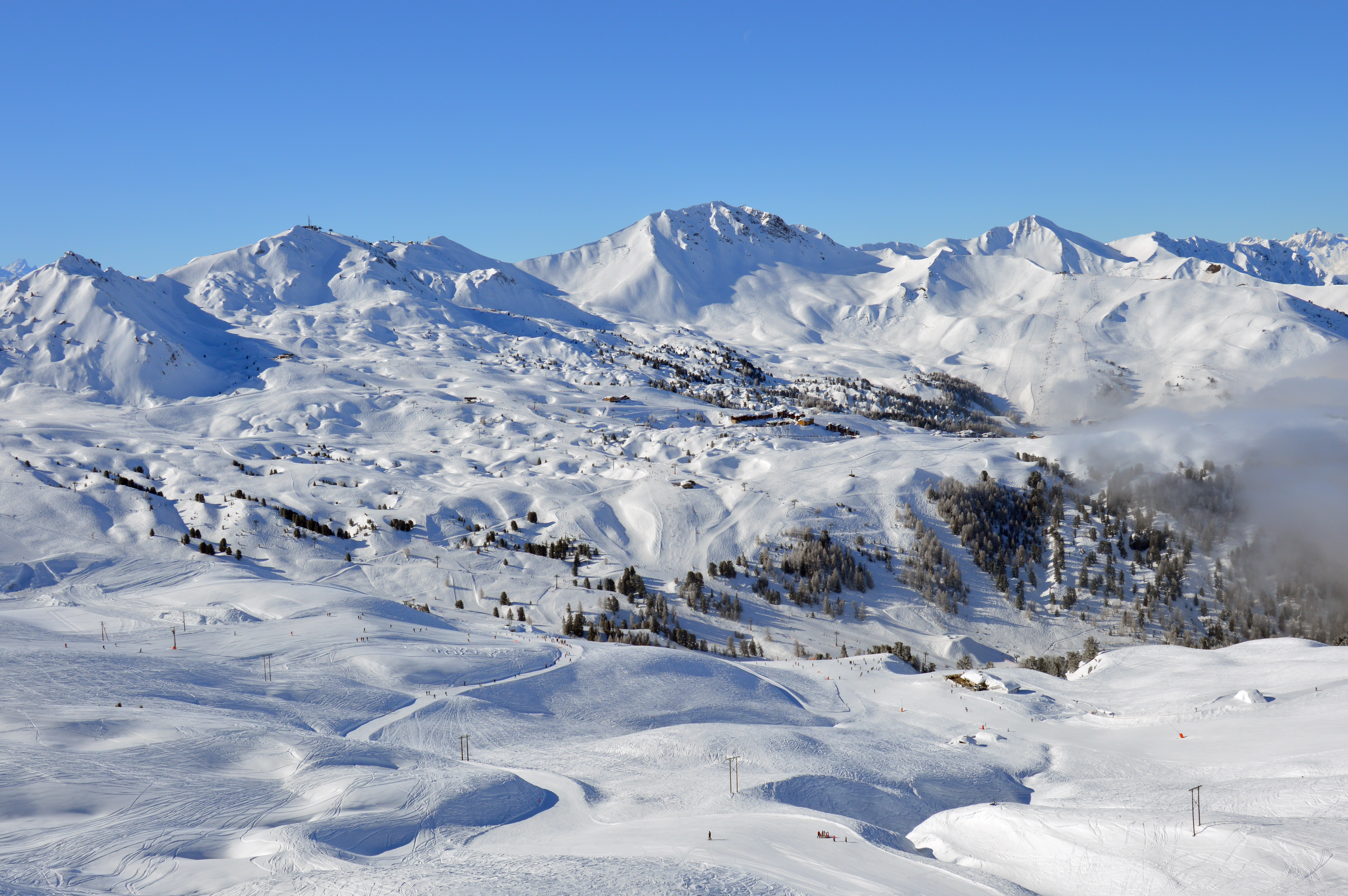
Ski slopes in La Plagne.

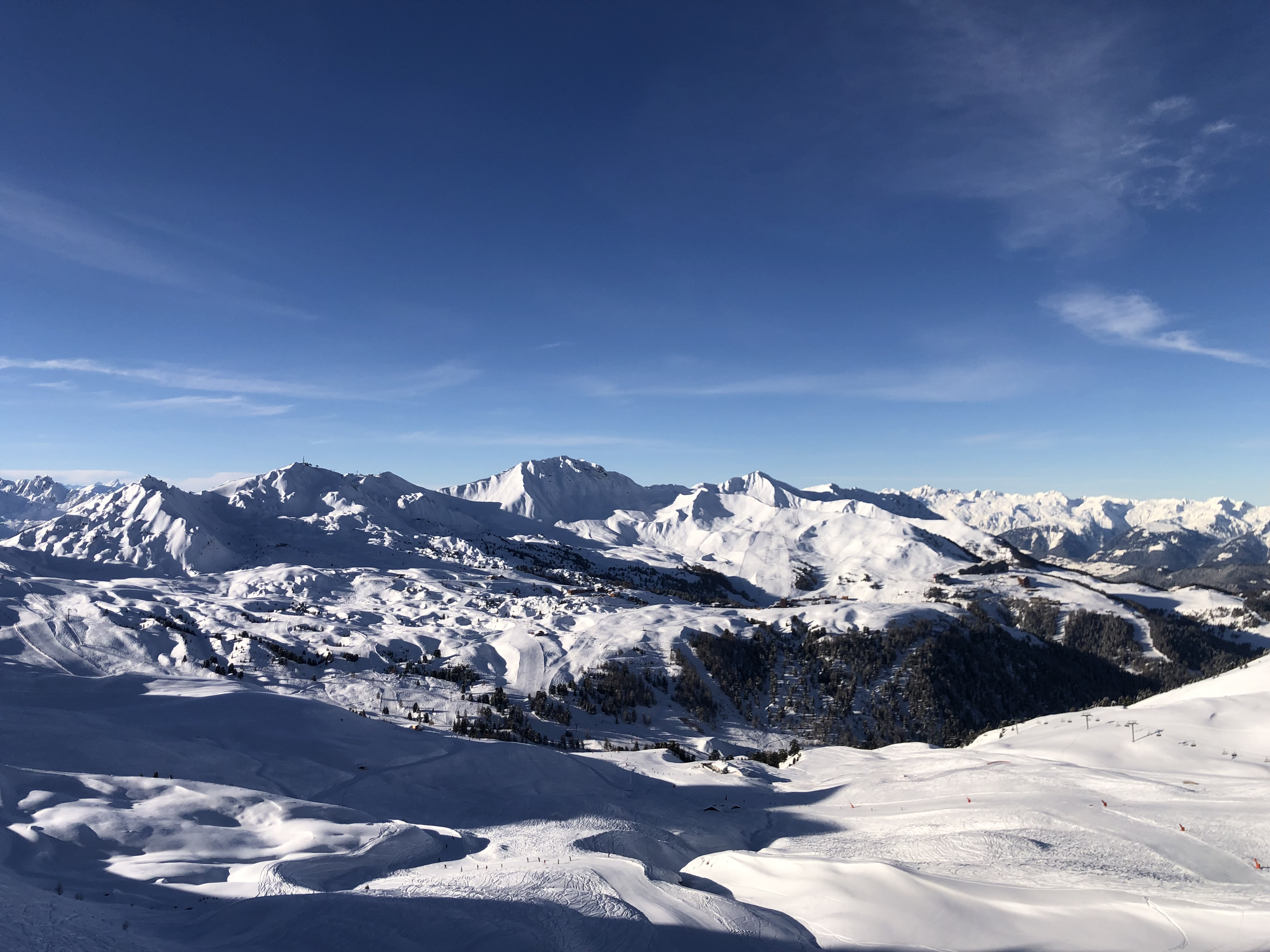
View of the Alps at La Plagne.

La Plagne lies at altitudes between 3,250 metres (10,660 ft) (on the Glacier de la Chiaupe near the top of Bellecôte) and 1,250 m (4,100 ft) (in the village of Montchavin). La Plagne has 100 km^{2} (39 sq mi) of ski area spread across four communes (Aime, Bellentre, Champagny-en-Vanoise and Mâcot-la-Plagne). La Plagne has 225 kilometres (140 mi) of slopes (134 slopes: 15 black/expert, 30 red/advanced, 72 blue/intermediate, and 10 green/beginner), and a large off piste skiing area including Bellecôte's North Face. La Plagne is a modern ski resort with 2 cable-cars: the Telemetro, linking Plagne Centre and Aime-La Plagne and the Vanoise Express (which links La Plagne to Les Arcs, was opened in 2003, and travels at over 40 km/h (11 m/s; 25 mph), making it one of the fastest of its kind in the world, 8 gondolas, 36 chairlifts (2 8-seater, 11 6-seaters, 19 4-seaters, and 5 2-seaters) and 38 drag lifts. A bobsleigh, luge, and skeleton track was built in La Plagne for the 1992 Winter Olympics held in nearby Albertville and will be reused in 2030 in the French Alps. At the end of the 2022/23 winter ski season, ski access to the Chiaupe Glacier will close. The glacier is being "rewilded" to preserve the snow conditions. There will be access to ski the Bellecôte glacier, which will still be above 3,000m, but the peak will not be as high as the Chiaupe Glacier.

== History ==
La Plagne was created in 1961, as with many resorts in the Alps, to save the valleys from becoming deserted. The agriculture and mining industries were in crisis, which led to young people leaving the valley in search of work. In 1960, four towns (Aime, Bellentre, Longefoy and Macôt) created an association to defend their interests, with an initiative of Dr. Pierre Borrione, mayor of Aime. On 24 December 1961, La Plagne opened, with its two drag lifts and its four slopes. Emile Allais, great ski-champion, has helped La Plagne to grow. Immediately, La Plagne generated a great deal of success, and in 1966, Guy Lux, a French TV host, presented "Interneiges", a live competition between two French resorts.

== Eleven resorts ==
=== Plagne Centre (1,970 m) ===
The first of the resorts of La Plagne opened in December 1961. The name of "Plagne Centre" dates from 1982, before which the resort was simply called La Plagne. Plagne Centre has an urban, but functional architecture, and was created by Michel Bezançon. Plagne Centre is a model of the "station intégrée", where cars and skiers are separated.

=== Aime-La Plagne (2,100 m) ===
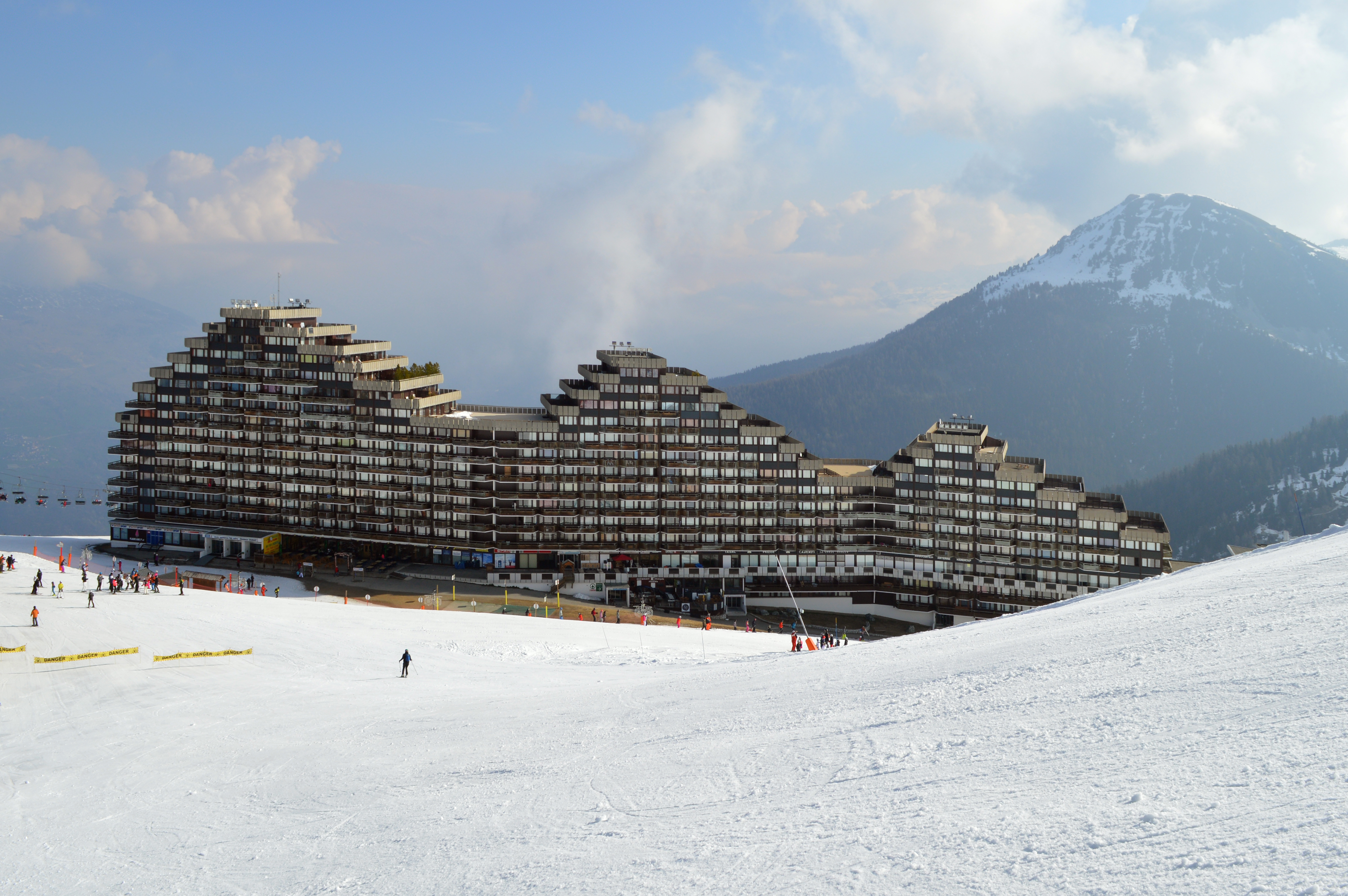
The "Steamer of the snow" in Plagne Aime 2000

Located in the commune of Aime, the building of Aime-La Plagne began in 1968, but the resort itself opened in December 1969. Called the "Steamer of the snow", the main building (picture on the right) of Aime-La Plagne was created by Michel Bezançon. In 1990, the "Club Med" was built, with a design inspired by Tibetan temples.

=== Champagny-en-Vanoise (1,250 m) ===
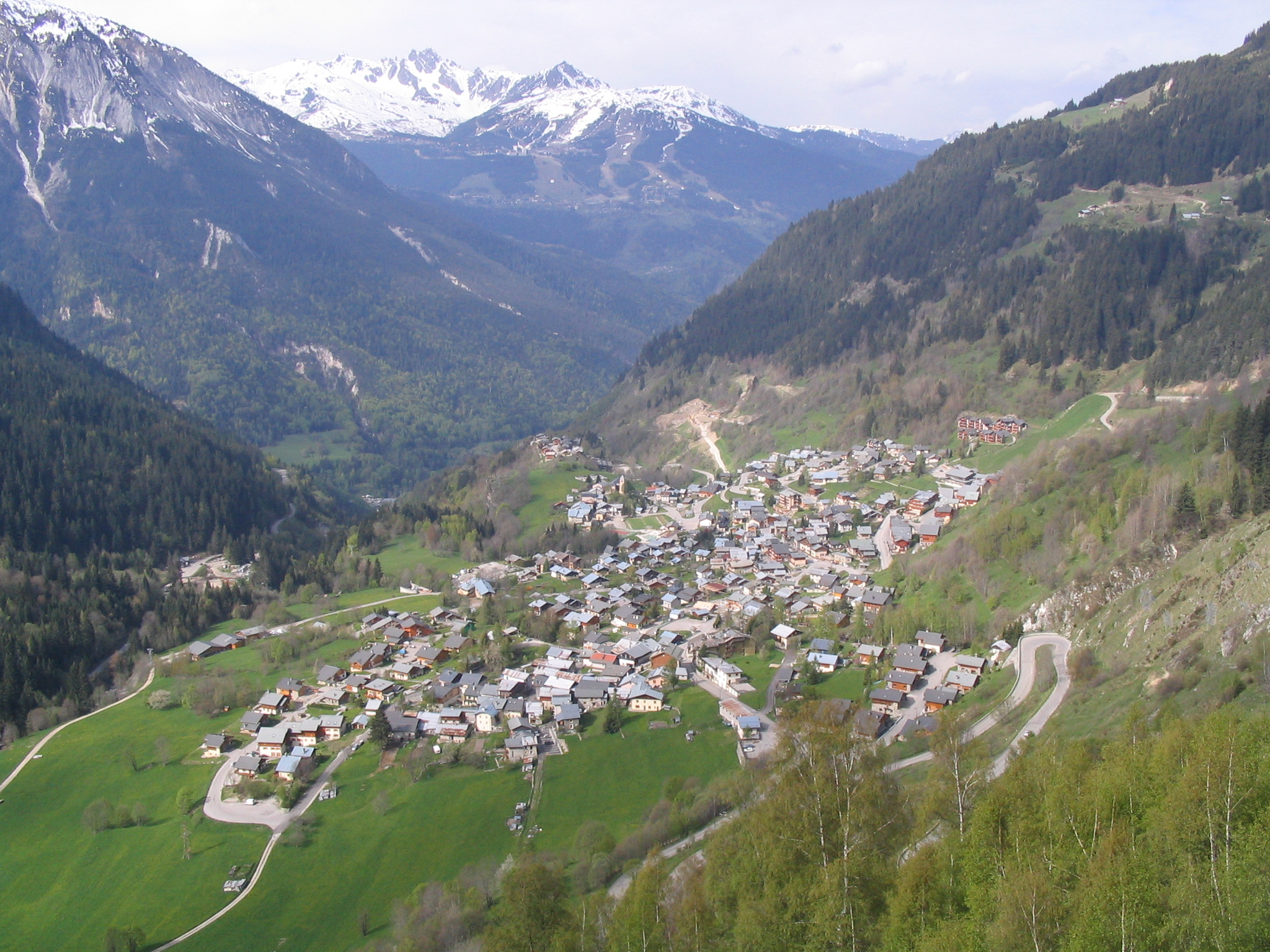
Champagny in May 2005

At the end of the '60s, this little village, located in the valley of Bozel, wanted to grow. The Vanoise National Park gave Champagny possibility to develop its summer activities. In 1969, Champagny became attached to the La Plagne resort, rather than to nearby Courchevel. Champagny is on a south-facing slope, unlike the other parts of La Plagne, meaning it gets more sunshine, therefore less snow.

=== Montchavin (1,250 m) ===
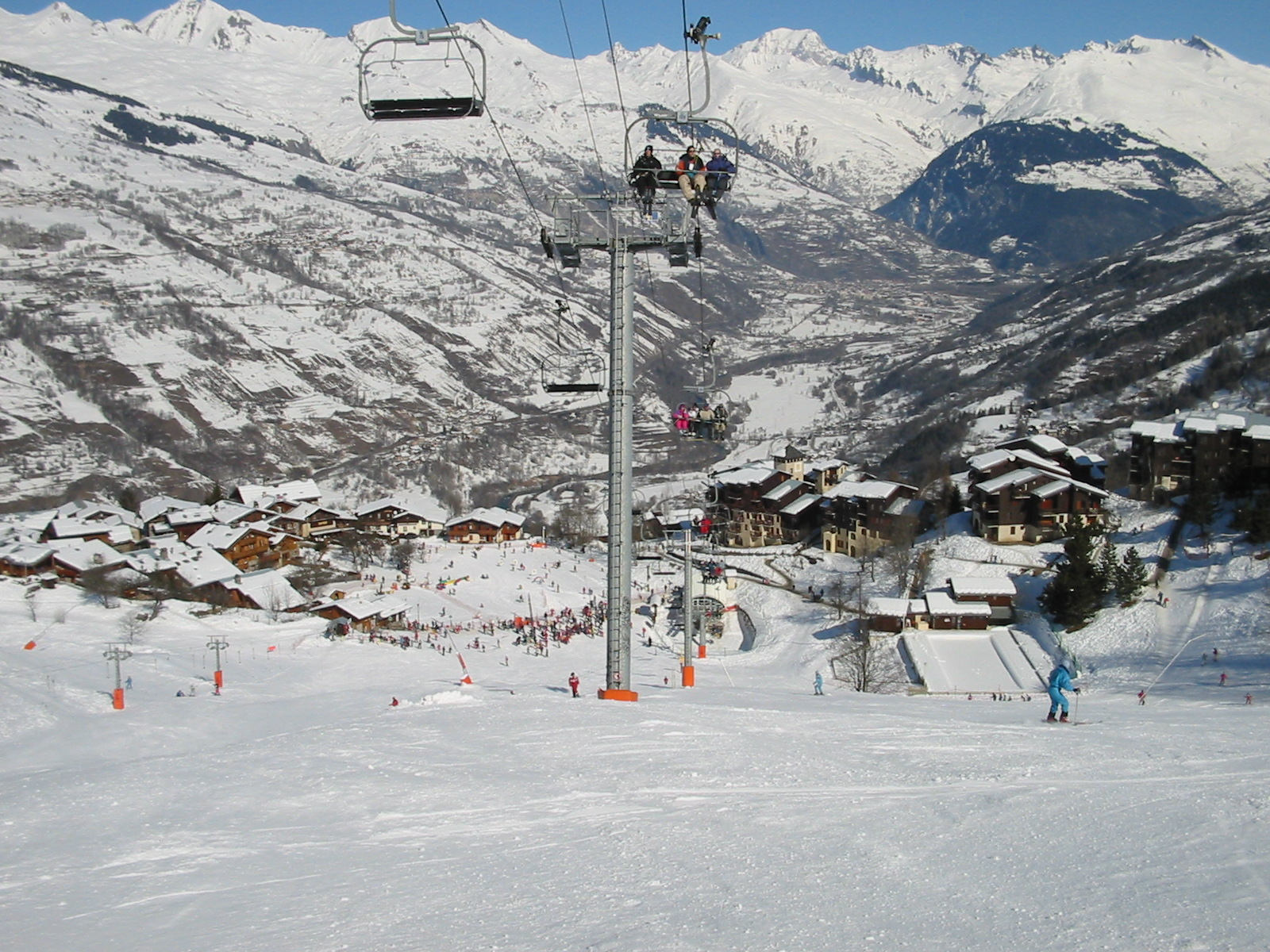
Montchavin in February 2003

Montchavin is found in the commune of Bellentre which is historically an alpine farming community, that still has many of its original and pretty buildings. Now there are 3 chairlifts serving the village of Montchavin, with one linking to Les Coches, a short distance away, and the Paradiski ski circuit beyond.

=== Plagne Villages (2,050 m) ===
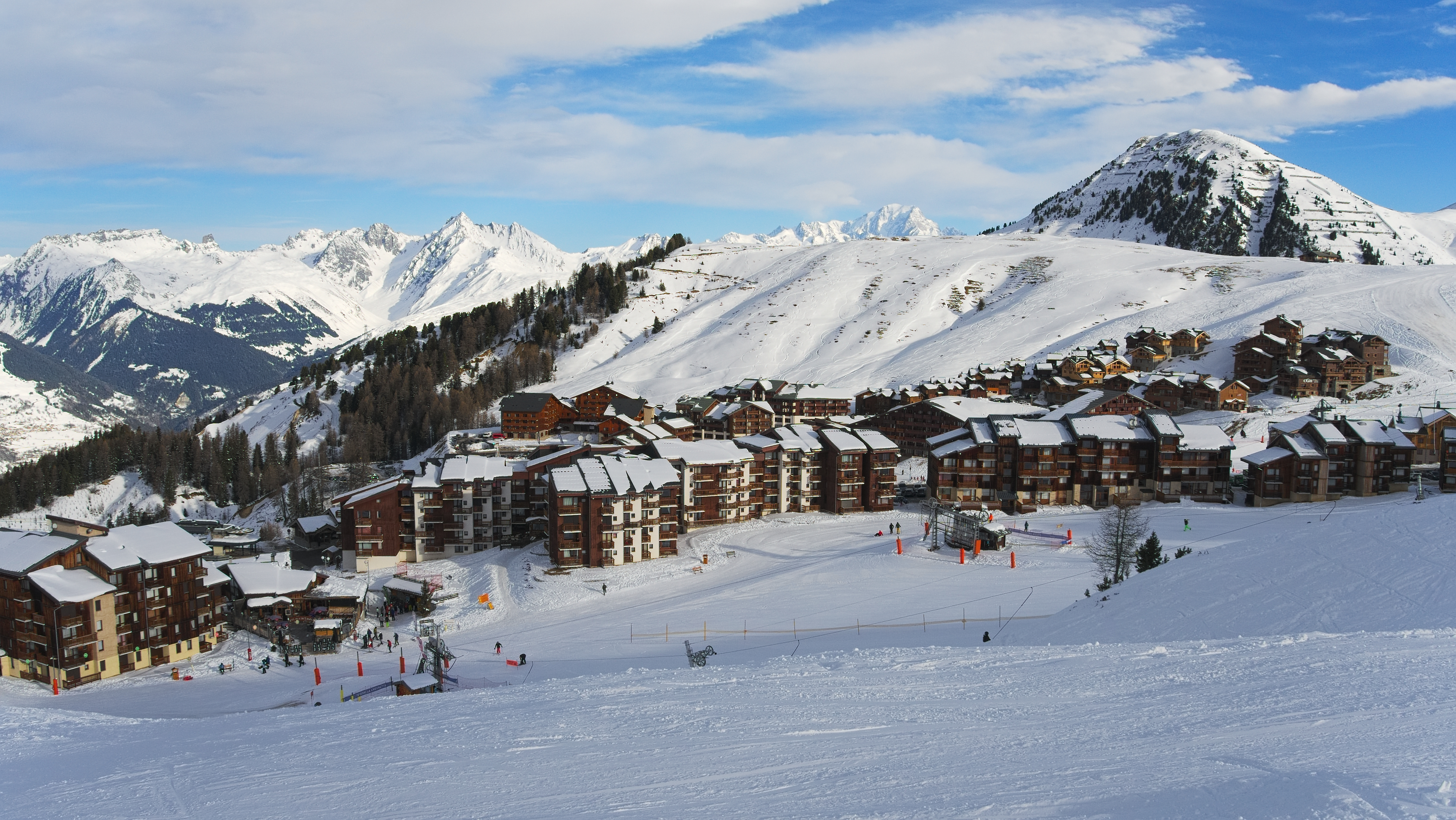
Plagne Villages with Plagne Soleil in the background

Opened in 1972.

=== Plagne Bellecôte (1,930 m) ===
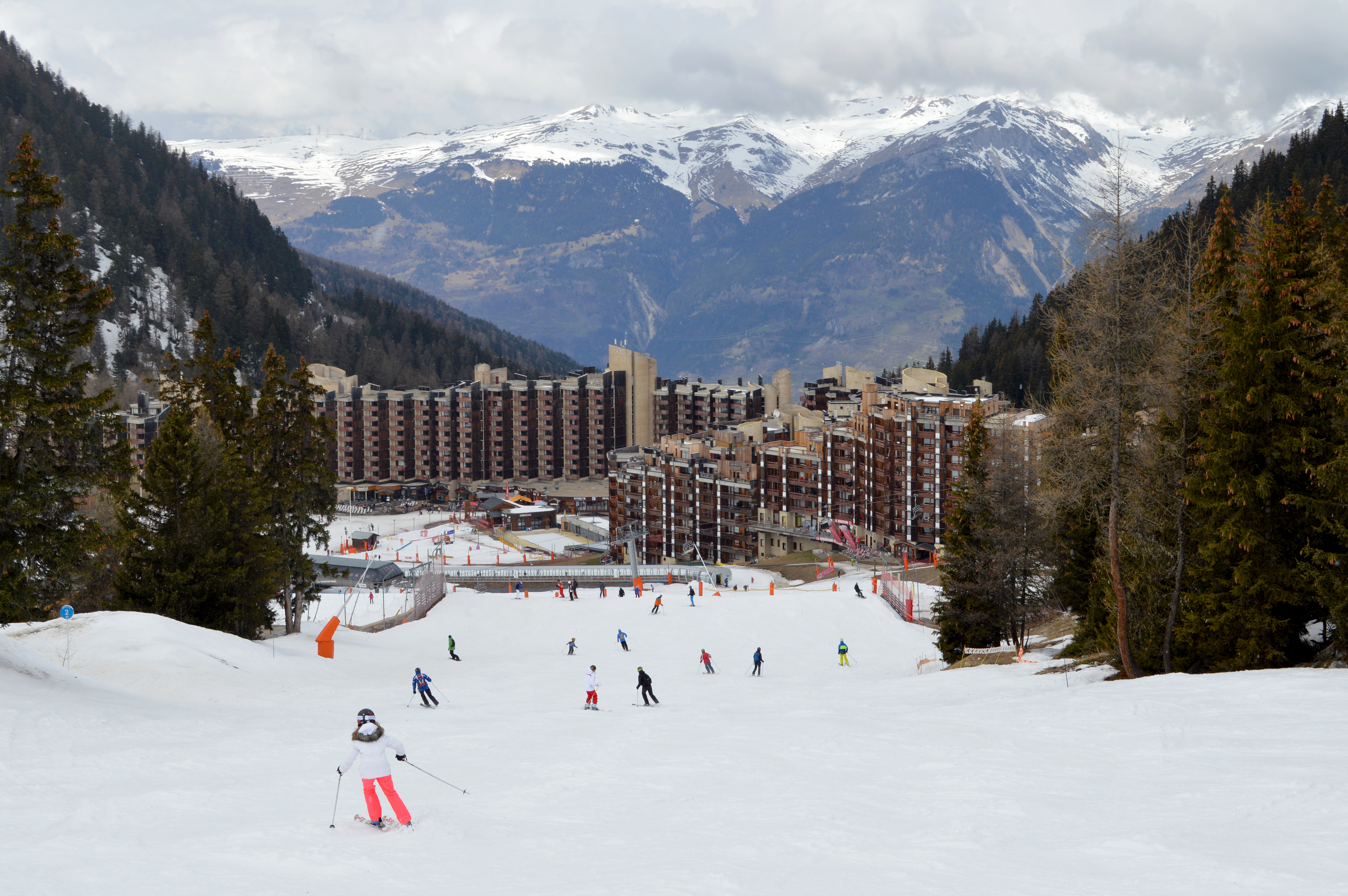
Plagne Bellecôte in 2017

Created in 1974, this resort was in project since 1968. It was to be called "Les Ours", but it is the summit of Bellecôte which gave its name to the new resort. Michel Bezançon drew the resort like a hydroelectric dam to close the valley. In 1975, a gondola linked Bellecôte with Roche de Mio, and three years later with the summit of Bellecôte, in 40 minutes. In December 2005, the first 8-seater chairlift in La Plagne (Arpette Chairlift) was built in Bellecôte.

=== Les Coches (1,450 m) ===
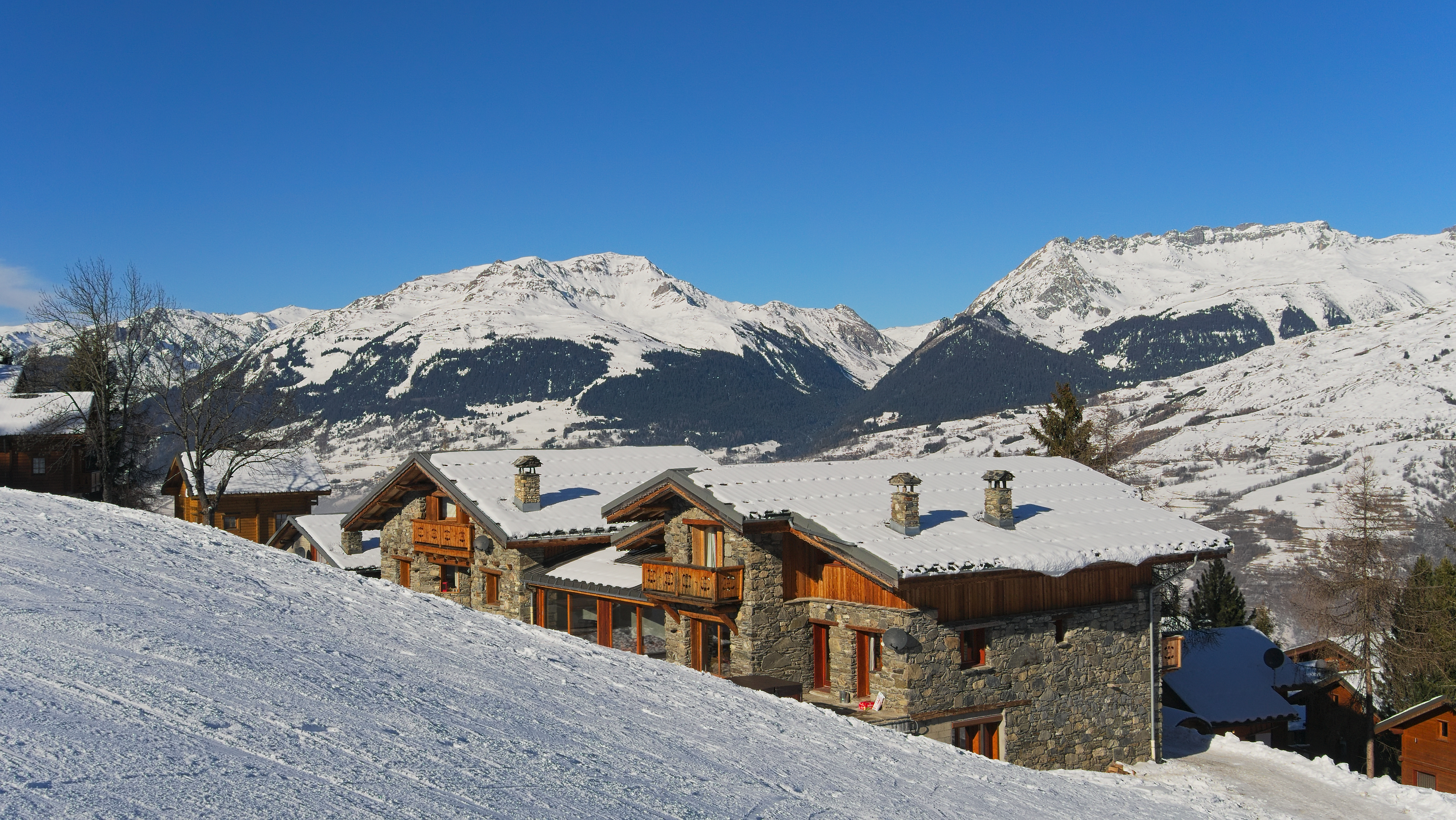
Les Coches.

Opened in 1980 as a satellite to Montchavin, Les Coches is primarily a family resort now located at the centre of the Paradiski circuit and next to the Vanoise Express cable car, also linking into the La Plagne area by a six person high speed chair (Plan Bois). This area offers runs down through larch forests and the accommodation includes self-catering apartments.

=== Montalbert (1,350 m) ===
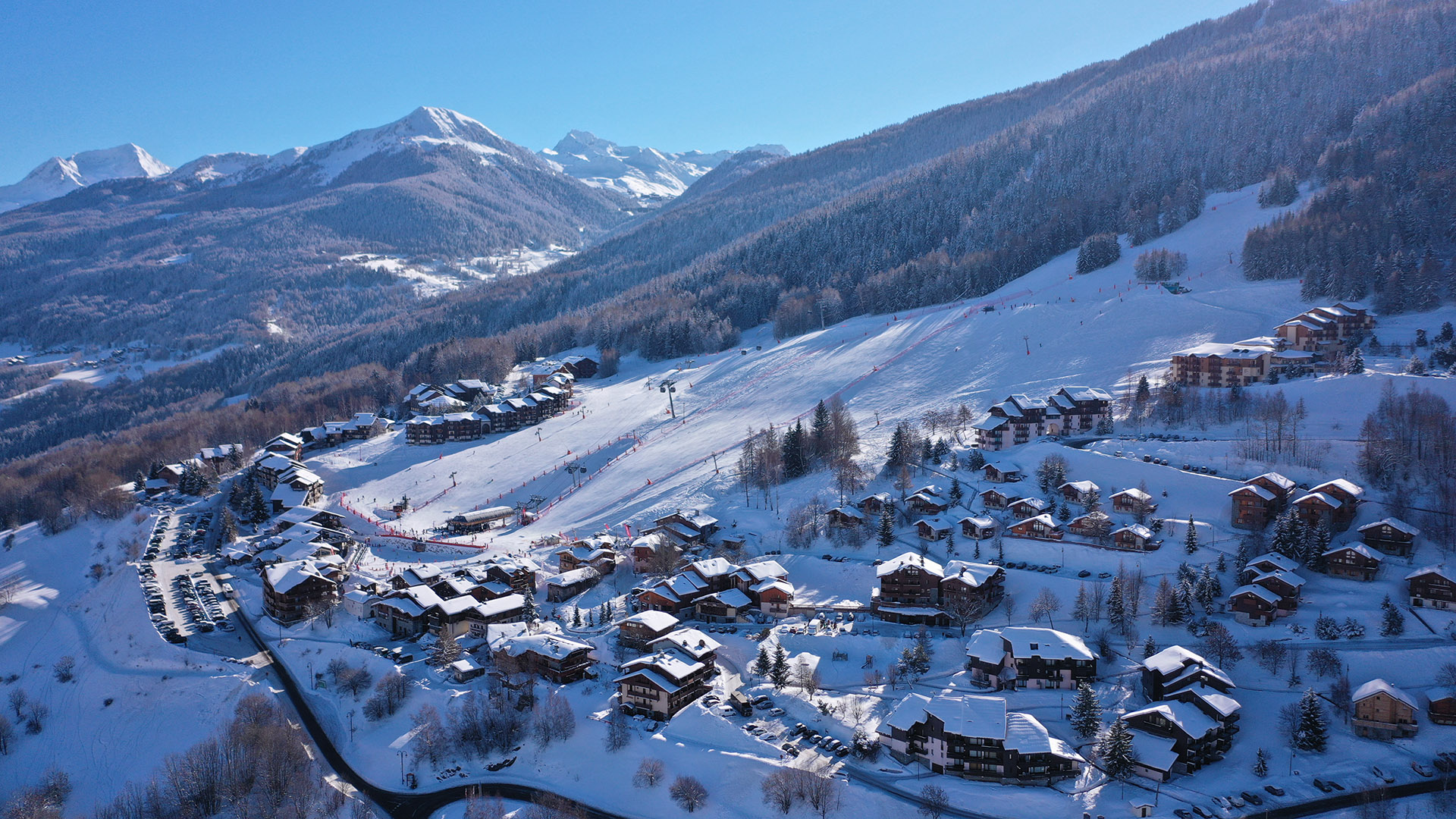
Plagne Montalbert

Opened in 1980.

=== Plagne 1800 (1,800 m) ===
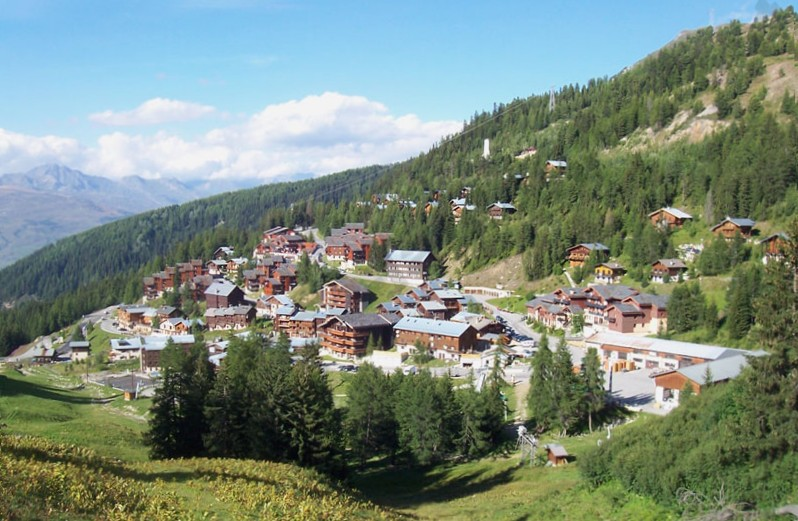
Plagne 1800 in August 2006

Opened in 1982.

La Plagne 1800 is known as the backwater of La Plagne with a special charm. An old mining village that still sports the traditional wooden chalets with locally quarried 'blue lauze' slate roofs.

=== Belle Plagne (2,050 m) ===
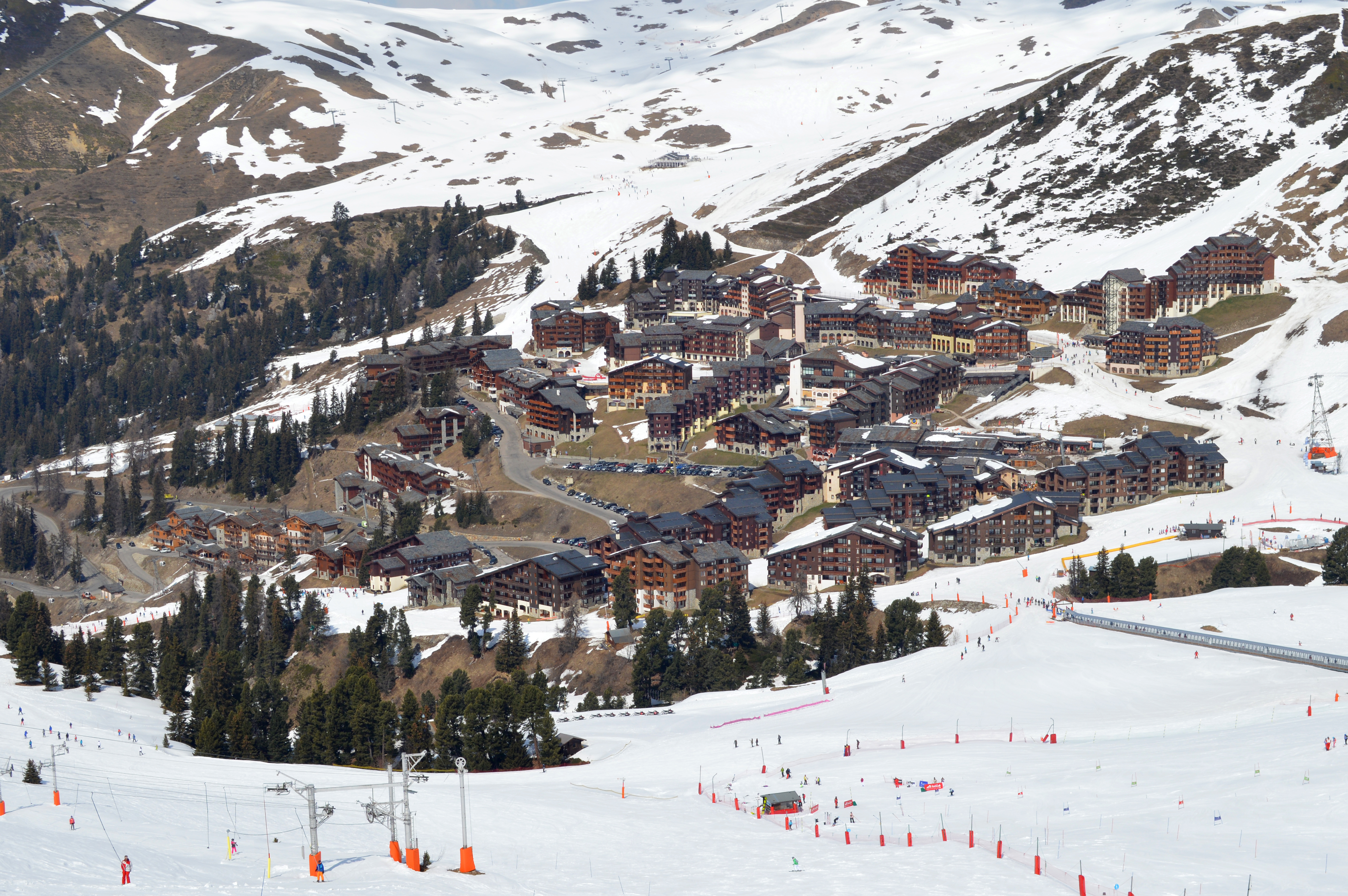
Belle Plagne

Opened in 1981. Belle Plagne is directly linked with Plagne Bellecote by telecabine. During season this lift remains open until midnight whereas the normal ski lifts already close around 5:00 pm. British tour operator Esprit Ski has its flagship hotel, L'Hotel des Deux Domaines (pictured far left) in the village, which is open in both the winter and the summer.

=== Plagne Soleil (2,050 m) ===
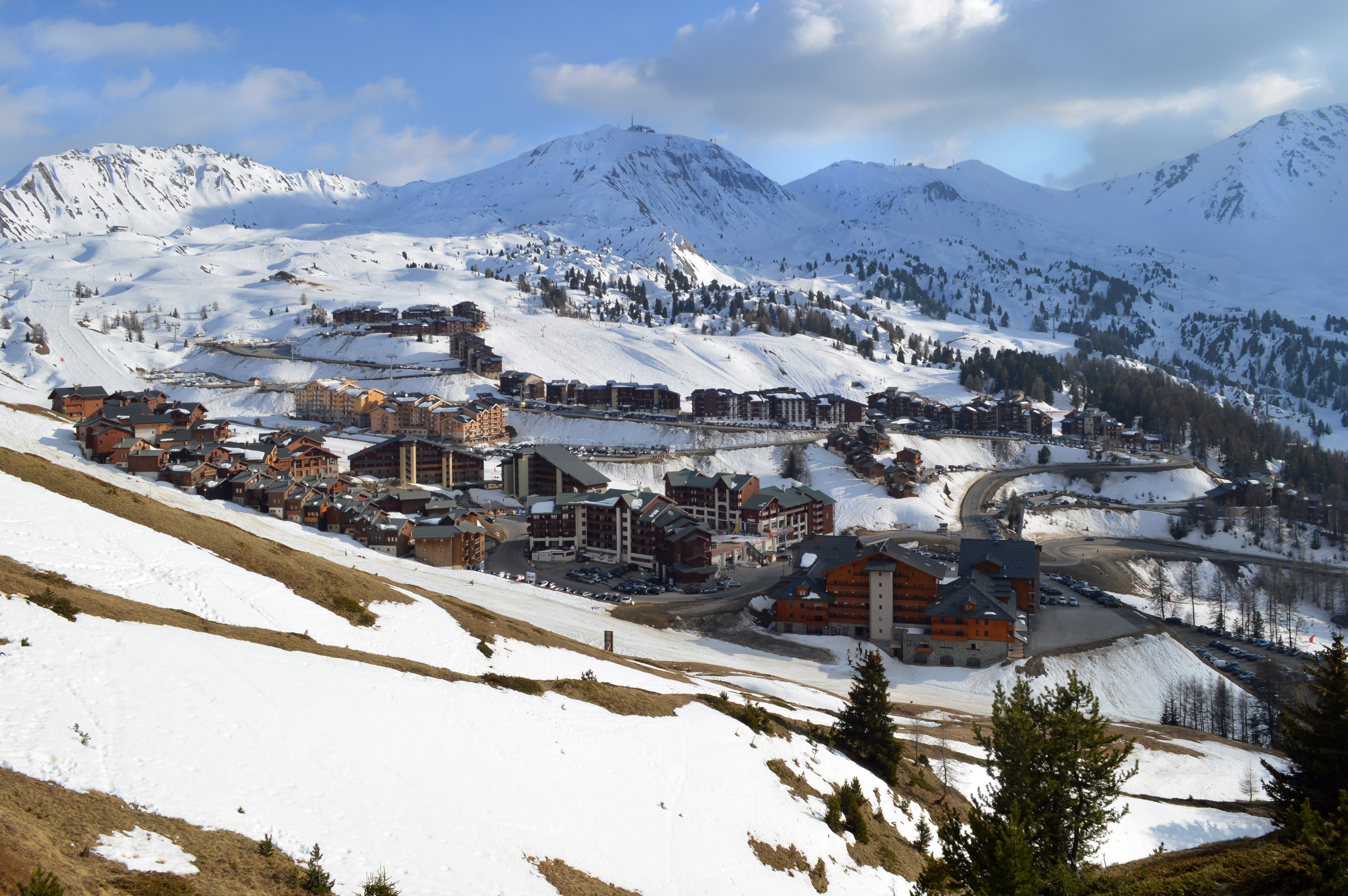
Plagne Soleil with Plagne Villages in the back

Opened in 1990.
