= Montalbert =

Village in France

Coordinates: 45°32′5″N 6°38′13″E

Montalbert

Montalbert (French pronunciation: [mɔ̃talbɛʁ]) is a village in France near the Tarentaise Valley. Montalbert was originally a farming hamlet. Montalbert has a ski resort, La Plagne. There is also a ski school.

Montalbert is about 10 km from Aime-la-Plagne.
