= Vanoise =

Vanoise may refer to:

- Vanoise National Park in France
- Vanoise Express, a cable car line
- Vanoise Massif, a sub-group of the Graian Alps in France
