= Paradiski =

Ski area in the Tarentaise Valley of France

Coordinates: 45°32′45″N 6°45′34″E

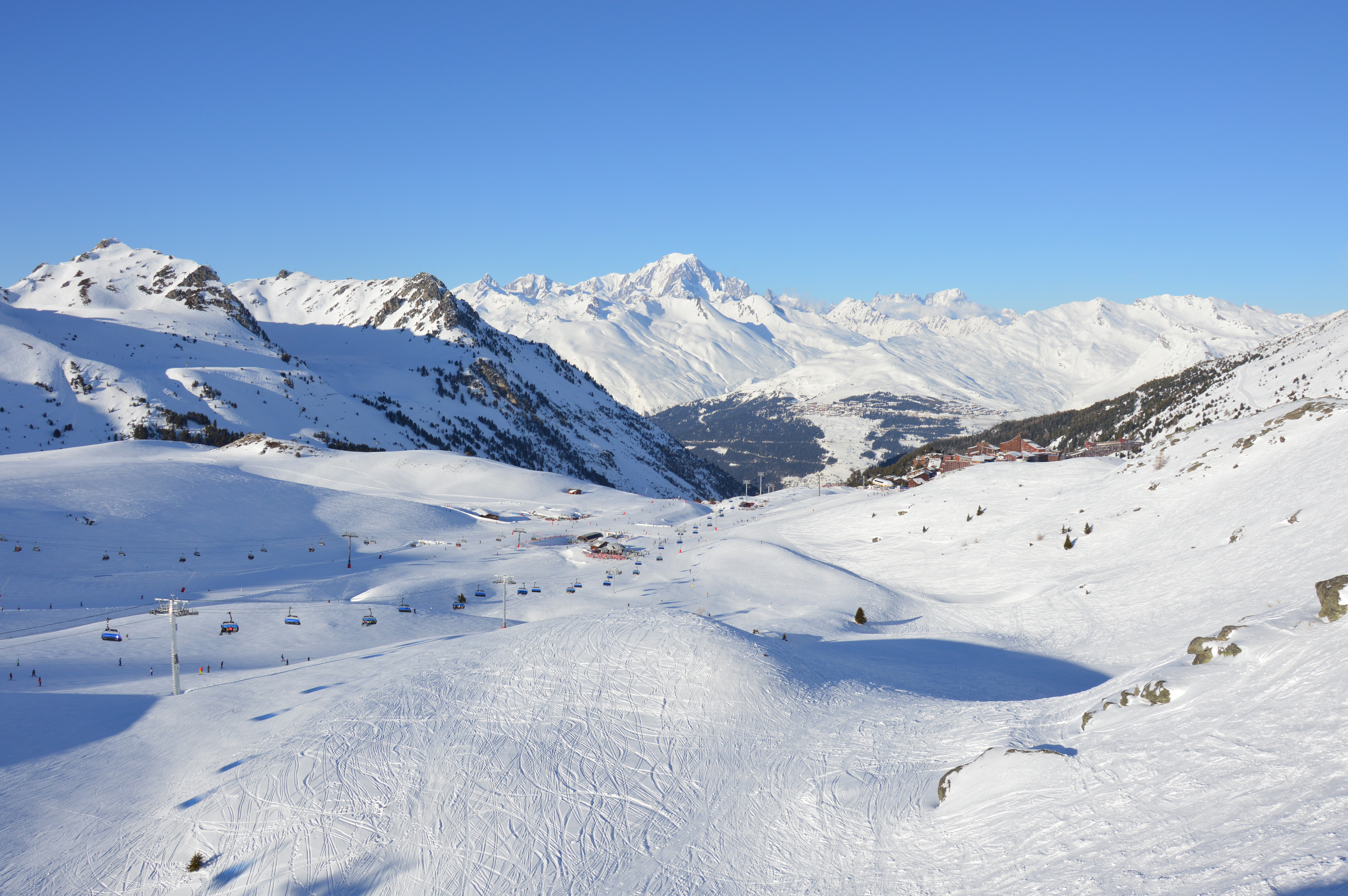
Valley of Arc 1950 and Arc 2000 in Les Arcs

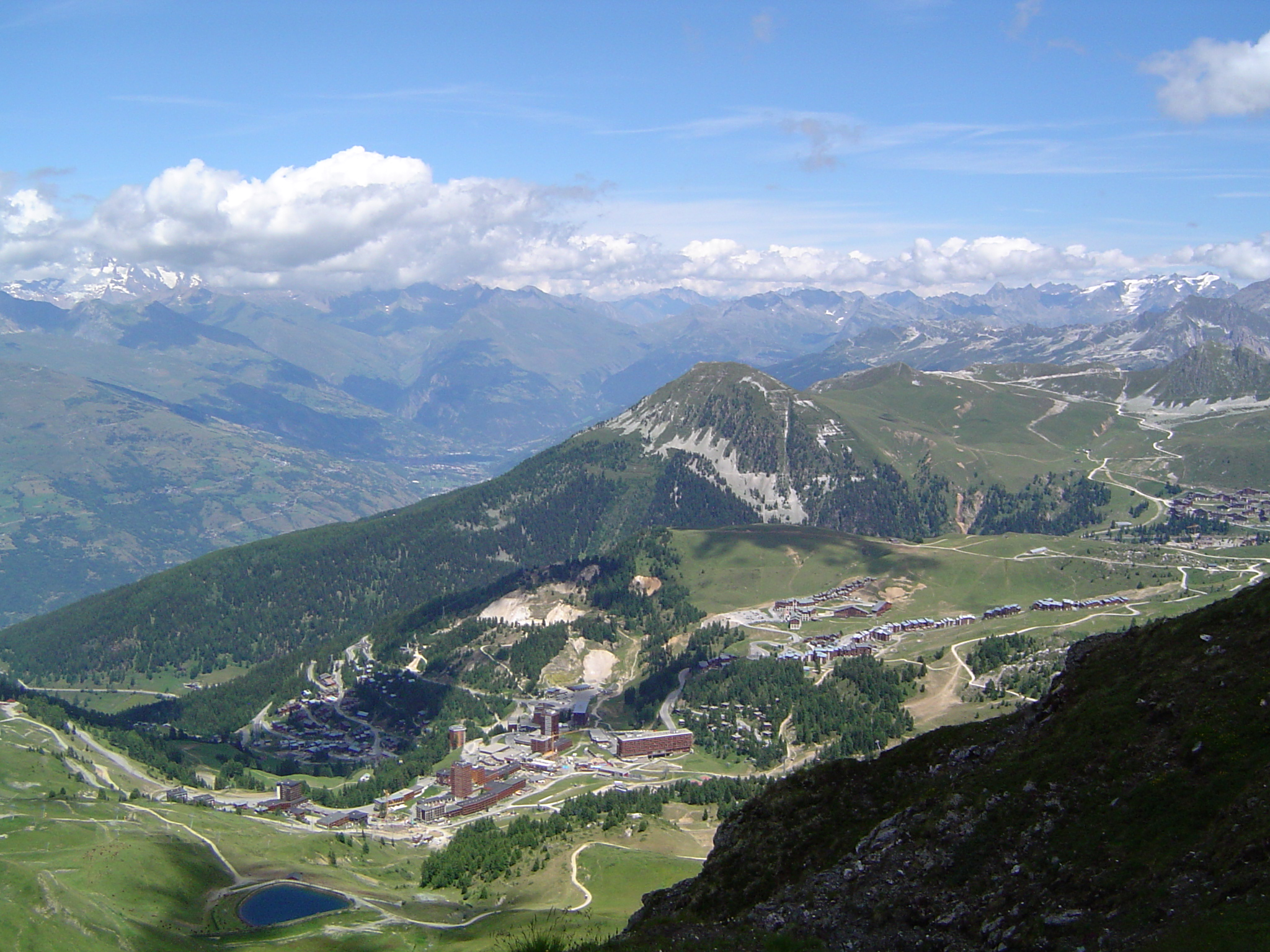
La Plagne in Summer

Paradiski is a ski area in the Tarentaise Valley of France that offers uninterrupted skiing in between the areas of Les Arcs, Peisey-Vallandry and La Plagne. The area is linked, since December 2003, by the Vanoise Express lift. In total over the three resorts there are 160 lifts and 425 km (264 mi) of pistes, with 152 green/blue (beginner) runs, 79 red (intermediate) runs, and 22 black (expert) runs.

Well-known neighbour ski areas are Espace Killy (Val d'Isère and Tignes) and Les Trois Vallées (Courchevel, Meribel, Val Thorens and more). Lift tickets can span across all the areas. There were plans to interlink all resorts, creating the largest ski area in the world, however that vision ended due to the creation of the Vanoise National Park.
