= Tarentaise Valley =

Valley of the Isère River in the Savoy region of France

Coordinates: 45°33′N 6°39′E

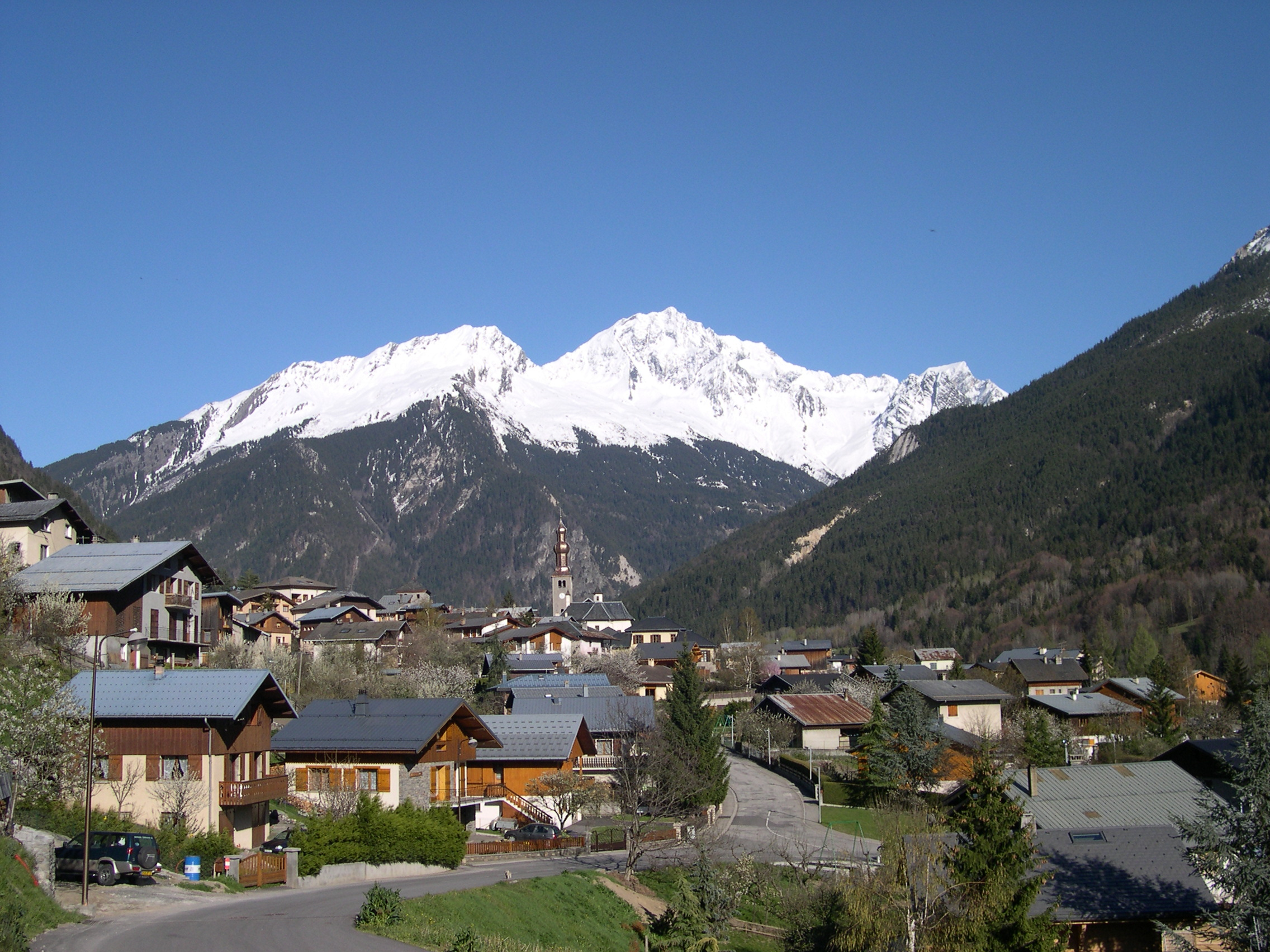
General sight of Bozel, in Tarentaise Valley.

The Tarentaise Valley (French: Vallée de la Tarentaise, pronounced [vale də la taʁɑ̃tɛz]; Arpitan: Tarentèsa; Italian: Tarantasia) is a valley of the Isère River in the heart of the French Alps, located in the Savoy region of France. The valley is named for the ancient town of Darantasia, the capital of the pre-Roman Centrones tribe.

== Description ==
At the foot of the valley, in the west, is the city of Albertville. Going east up the valley, Moûtiers is reached, then Aime, and finally the last large town, Bourg-Saint-Maurice.

The area is internationally best known for its world-renowned ski resorts, including Les Trois Vallées (Courchevel, Méribel, Val Thorens etc.—off a side valley from Moûtiers), Paradiski with La Plagne above Aime, and Les Arcs above Bourg-Saint-Maurice. Tignes-Val-d'Isère is further up the valley. These communities hosted most of the events for the 1992 Albertville Winter Olympics.

There were once plans to interlink all systems and resorts to create the—by far—largest ski area in the world. However that vision was ended with the creation of the Vanoise National Park. Other ski areas includes Sainte-Foy-Tarentaise, La Rosière, and Valmorel.

In the winter, the valley is a cul-de-sac, with its road finishing at Val d'Isere. In the summer, there is a pass over to the Maurienne at the head of the valley Col de l'Iseran, and a couple of others further down, including the Little St Bernard Pass eastwards to Italy via La Rosiere and La Thuile and the Cormet de Roselend northwards.

Both sides of the valley, but especially the sunnier northern side, have rural farming communities all the way along. The colder southern side tends to be dominated by the ski resorts but has occasional small hamlets.

== Transport ==
The valley has a railway as far as Bourg-Saint-Maurice, which, in the winter season, has various direct sleeper trains from Paris and Eurostar trains from London. The valley road N90 is dual carriageway as far as Moûtiers, after which it becomes a standard two-lane but single-carriageway road, which can see substantial queues in winter. This road is currently receiving funding from the European Union for a significant improvement project between Aime and Moûtiers, one of the narrowest points in the valley.
