= Vanoise Express =

Cable car in Savoie, France

Coordinates: 45°33′33″N 6°44′04″E

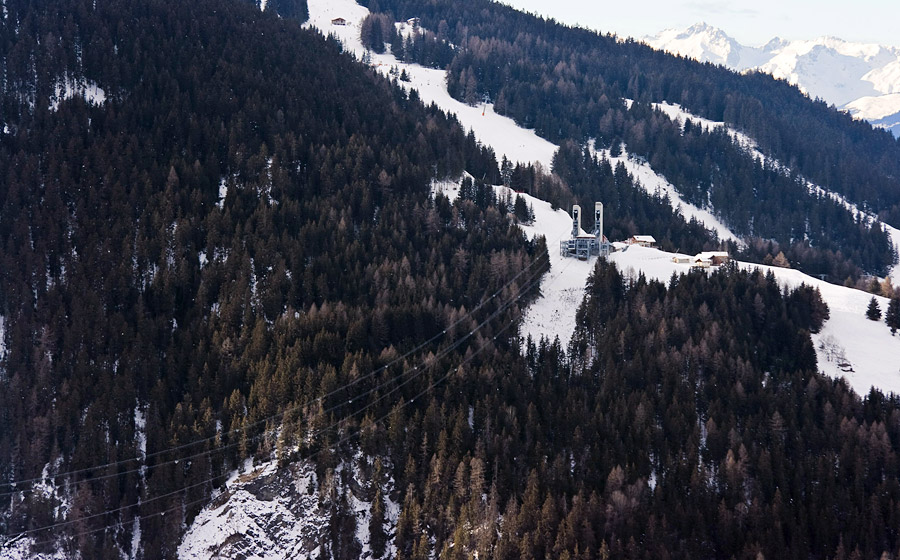
Vanoise Express (view from Peisey-Vallandry)

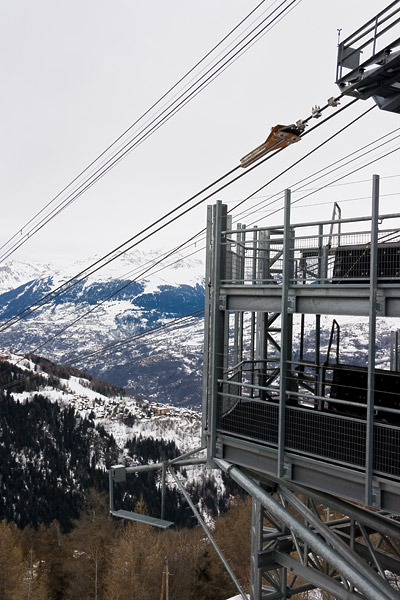
Vanoise Express (view from Peisey-Vallandry)

The Vanoise Express is a French double-decker cable car that links La Plagne with Les Arcs ski resorts in the Alps, acting as a vital link in the Paradiski area.

Ordered by Compagnie des Alpes and built by Poma in time for the '03-'04 season, the lift stretches 1,800 m (5,900 ft), 380 m (1,250 ft) over the valley, takes 4 minutes to cross, and cost over 15 million Euro to complete. It was officially opened in December 2003. It has a capacity of over 200 people. It is not a conventional cable car. The two units can operate separately and have individual spare engines. The lift operates without any supporting pylons.

As a result of safety inspections in December 2007, the operators announced that this lift would remain shut for the entire 2007/2008 season as repairs could not be undertaken until the spring. This closure effectively shut down Paradiski for that season. It opened up again for 2008–09. It takes about 7–10 minutes to get from one ski area to another.

== See also ==
- List of spans
