= Bellecôte =

Mountain in France

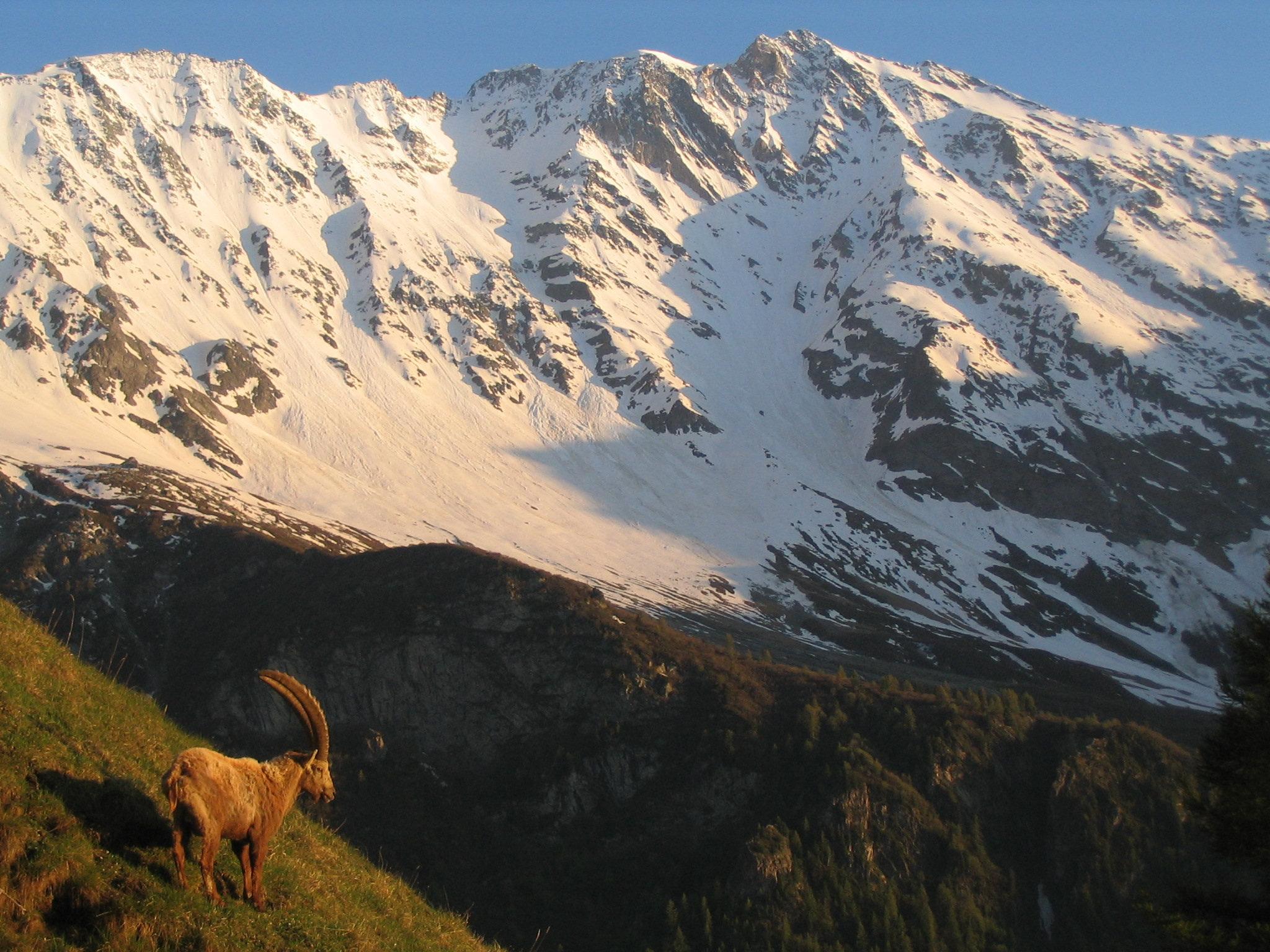
- North face of the Bellecôte

Highest point
- Elevation: 3,417 m (11,211 ft)
- Prominence: 808 m (2,651 ft)
- Isolation: 6.41 km (3.98 mi)
- Listing: Alpine mountains above 3000 m
- Coordinates: 45°29′34″N 06°46′56″E

Geography
- Location within France
- Location: Savoie, France
- Parent range: Graian Alps

Climbing
- First ascent: 12 September 1866 by Messrs Nichols and Roswell, with guides from Chamonix
- Easiest route: Via the Glacier du Cul du Nant (PD-)

The Bellecôte is a mountain in the Vanoise Massif in the Graian Alps, lying in the northern part of the Vanoise National Park and dominating the Peisey-Nancroix valley in Savoie. The north face is immense and austere, whereas the south face is more accessible.

The resort of La Plagne lies on one side of the Bellecôte.

== See also ==
- List of mountains of the Alps
