= Le Praz =

Village in France

Coordinates: 45.431°N 6.616°E

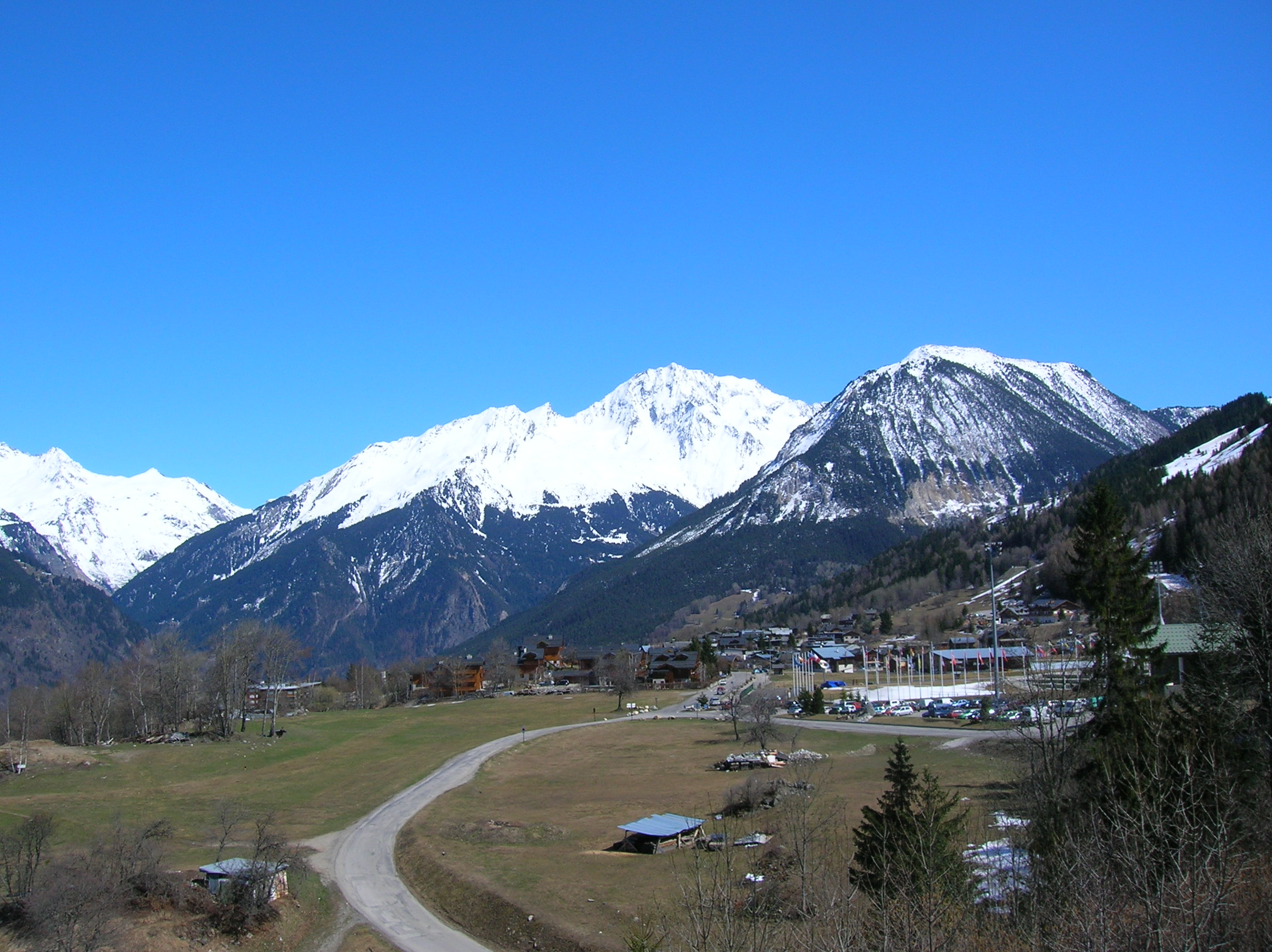
A view of the village

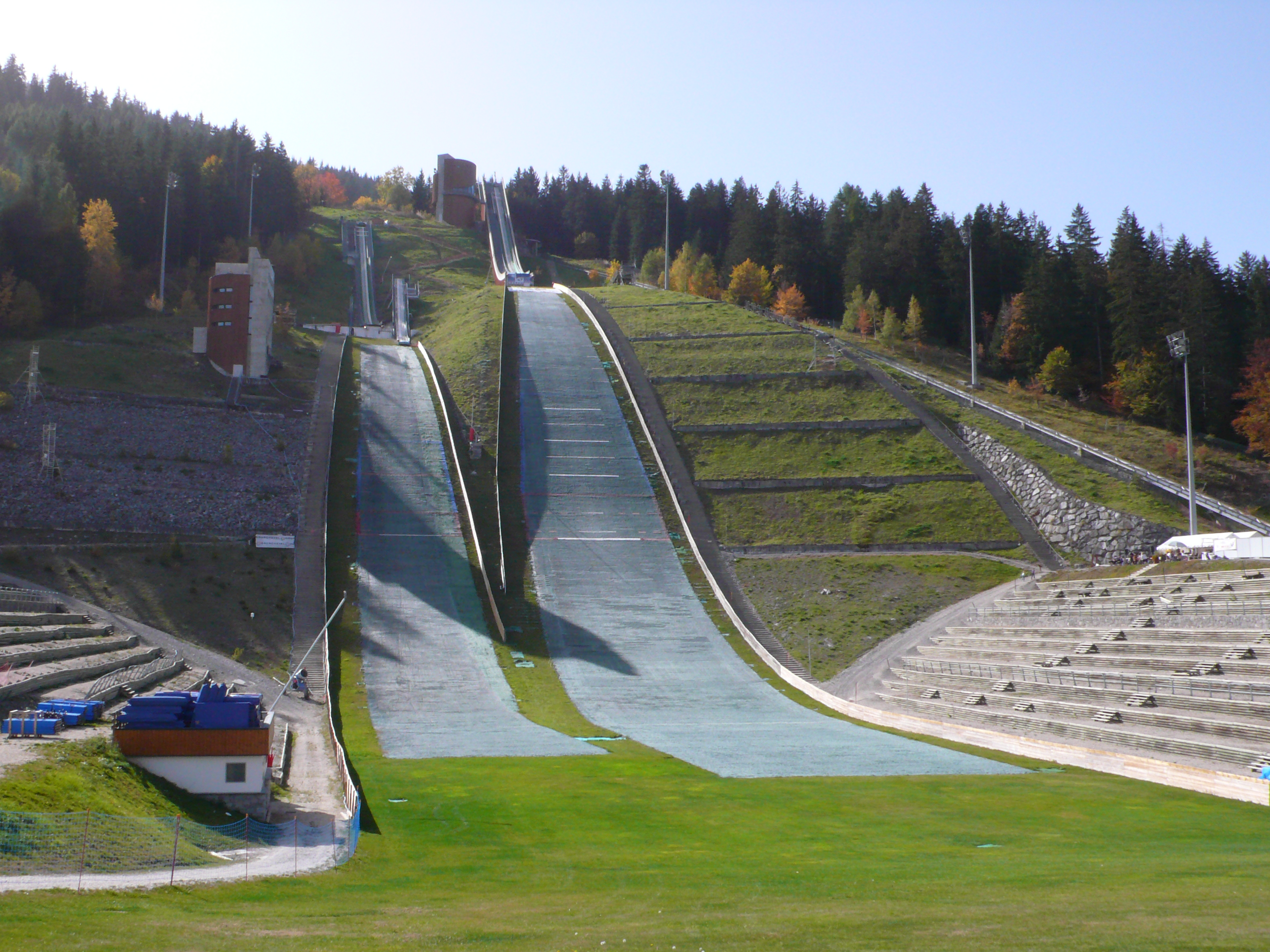
Tremplin du Praz, built for the 1992 Winter Olympics

Le Praz is a village located on a plateau at the foot of the forest in Courchevel, Savoie, France, at the foot of Dent du Villard and Grand Bec. It features the ski jumping hill Tremplin du Praz, built for the 1992 Winter Olympics and used annually in the summer FIS Ski Jumping Grand Prix.
