= Sainte-Foy-Tarentaise =

- Commune
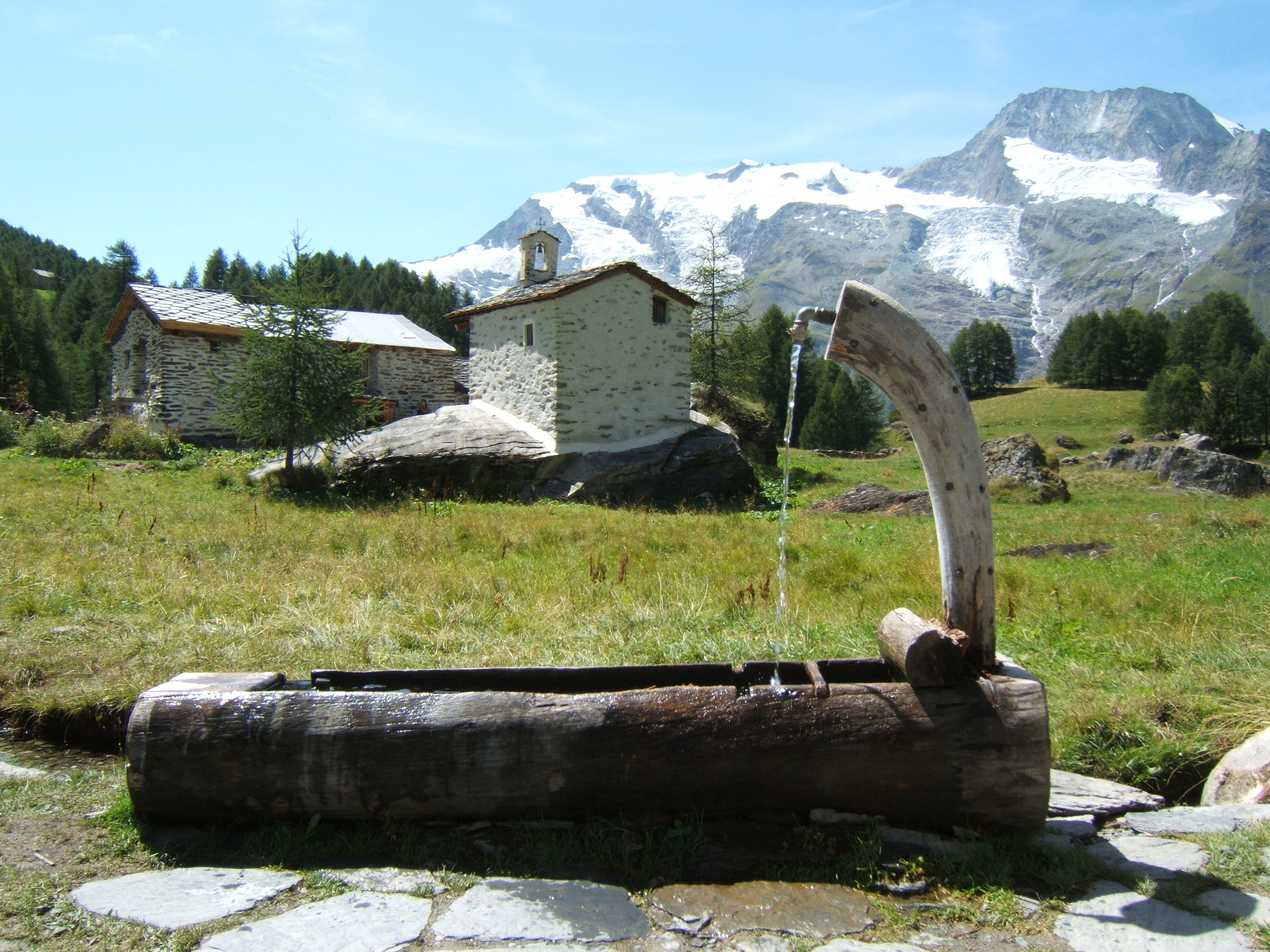
- The fountain and chapel in the hamlet of Le Monal, in Sainte-Foy-Tarentaise
- Location of Sainte-Foy-Tarentaise
- Location within France Location within Auvergne-Rhône-Alpes
- Coordinates: 45°35′N 6°53′E
- Country: France
- Region: Auvergne-Rhône-Alpes
- Department: Savoie
- Arrondissement: Albertville
- Canton: Bourg-Saint-Maurice
- Intercommunality: Haute Tarentaise

Government
  - Mayor (2020–2026): Yannick Amet
- Area^{1}: 100.15 km^{2} (38.67 sq mi)
- Highest elevation: 3,747 m (12,293 ft)
- Lowest elevation: 871 m (2,858 ft)
- Population (2023): 686
  - Density: 6.85/km^{2} (17.7/sq mi)
- Time zone: UTC+01:00 (CET)
  - Summer (DST): UTC+02:00 (CEST)
- INSEE/Postal code: 73232 /73640
- ^{1} French Land Register data, which excludes lakes, ponds, glaciers > 1 km^{2} (0.386 sq mi or 247 acres) and river estuaries.

Sainte-Foy-Tarentaise
- Location within Alps
- Top elevation: 2,622 m (8,602 ft)
- Base elevation: 1,550 m (5,090 ft)
- Trails: 24 total; 2 beginner; 7 easy; 11 intermediate; 4 difficult
- Lift system: 6 total; 4 chair lifts; 2 magic carpet lifts
- Website: www.saintefoy-tarentaise.com/english/winter/ski/

Sainte-Foy-Tarentaise (French pronunciation: [sɛ̃t fwa taʁɑ̃tɛz]) is a commune in the Savoie department in the Auvergne-Rhône-Alpes region in south-eastern France.

Sainte-Foy-Tarentaise is a village in the Tarentaise Valley in Savoie, France. The old village lies on the main road between Bourg-Saint-Maurice and Val-d'Isère. About 4 km above the village (turning left at La Thuile) is the ski resort of Sainte Foy (referred as Sainte Foy Station).

== Ski resort ==
The resort was built in an old farming hamlet, some of which survives as chalet accommodation. Most of the village has been built recently, but in a vernacular style. There are two spas in the resort, ski shops, 4 bars, 7 restaurants and 2 small supermarkets.

== The mountain ==
The mountain's highest point is the Col de l'Aiguille at 2620 m, with a vertical drop of just over 1000 m. There are around 20 pistes, four chairlifts, one Green and one Blue-grade trail, various Red runs and one groomed Black run with another three marked off-piste.

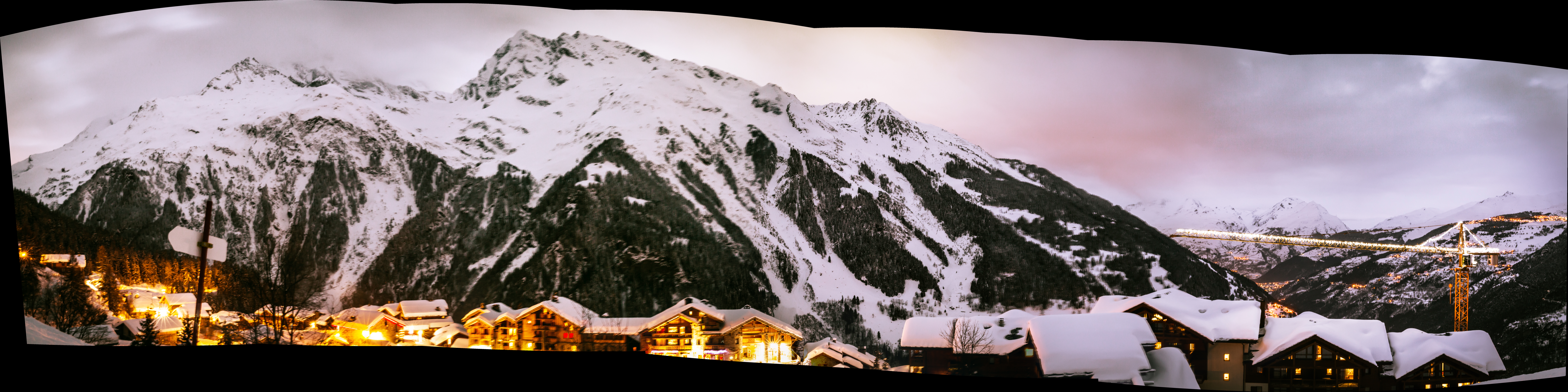
Sainte-Foy-Tarentaise at Night

== History ==
While the Tarentaise seems to have been populated as early as the 5th millennium B.C. by the Ceutrons, there is no evidence of a human presence in the commune of Sainte-Foy before the Romans settled there around the 3rd century B.C. The Tarentaise was then successively occupied by the Burgundians (a Nordic tribe) until the 10th century, and then administered by the archbishops of Charlemagne who protected the populations as best they could against the invasions of the Saracens. It seems that there was a place of worship in Sainte-Foy as soon as the region was evangelized by Jacques de Tarentaise in the 5th century, probably dedicated to Sainte-Madeleine, the second patron saint of the village, but the name of Sainte-Foy only appears in an official text in 1170.

From the 13th century until the end of the 18th century, Sainte-Foy depended on the seigneury of Val d'Isère and included Tignes and the entire valley. Between 1391 and 1738, the parish was administered by three trustees installed in the districts of Les Villes, Tiers de la Thuile and Tiers du Milieu. On 31 January 1784 Joseph Joachin d'Allinges, the last lord of Val d'Isère, freed Saint-Foy.

The construction of the Tignes dam, which had been planned since the 1930s, was resumed in 1947 and inaugurated on 4 July 1953 by President Auriol. The post-war rural exodus affected Sainte-Foy as elsewhere and the village inexorably emptied of its population: by 1975, the village had only 593 inhabitants. From the 1960s on, several projects for winter sports resorts were proposed, until in 1982, the site of Bon Conseil was finally selected for a ski resort. After delays and opposition to scheme, Mayor Daniel Pascual, elected in 1987, finally opened the first three chairlifts in the winter of 1990/91, with the slogan "Sainte-Foy, j'y crois". After a chaotic start, the resort became popular in the 2000s, especially with English and Dutch tourists.

== See also ==
- Communes of the Savoie department
