= Bozel =

Bozel Bosél (Arpitan)
- Commune
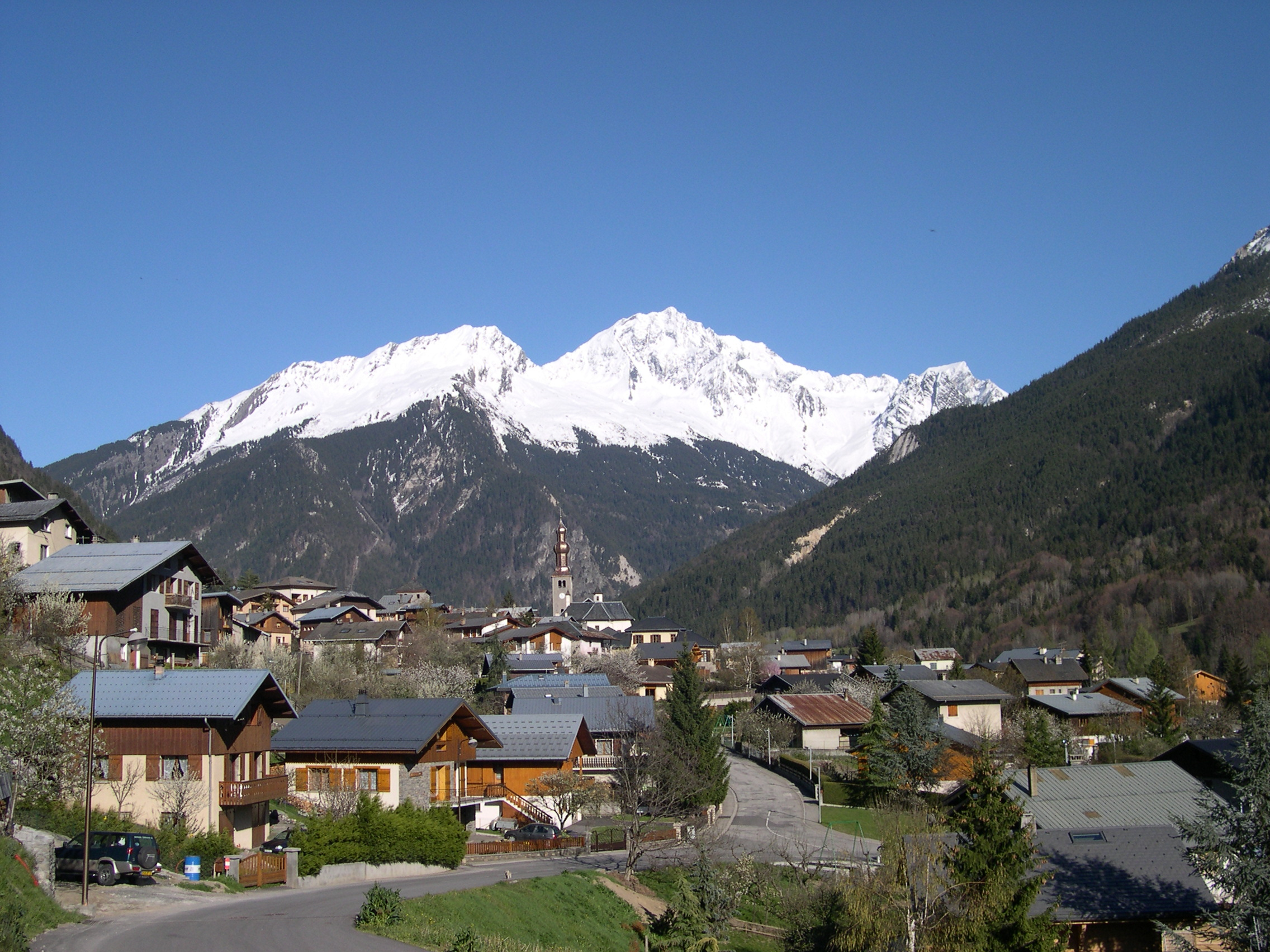
- The church and surrounding buildings in Bozel
- Location of Bozel
- Location within France Location within Auvergne-Rhône-Alpes
- Coordinates: 45°27′08″N 6°38′56″E
- Country: France
- Region: Auvergne-Rhône-Alpes
- Department: Savoie
- Arrondissement: Albertville
- Canton: Moûtiers
- Intercommunality: Val Vanoise

Government
  - Mayor (2020–2026): Sylvain Pulcini
- Area^{1}: 28.8 km^{2} (11.1 sq mi)
- Elevation: 768 m (2,520 ft)
- Highest elevation: 2,589 m (8,494 ft)
- Lowest elevation: 746 m (2,448 ft)
- Population (2023): 2,098
  - Density: 72.8/km^{2} (189/sq mi)
- Time zone: UTC+01:00 (CET)
  - Summer (DST): UTC+02:00 (CEST)
- INSEE/Postal code: 73055 /73350
- Website: www.ot-bozel.com, www.bozelinfo.com
- ^{1} French Land Register data, which excludes lakes, ponds, glaciers > 1 km^{2} (0.386 sq mi or 247 acres) and river estuaries.

Bozel (French pronunciation: [bɔzɛl]; Arpitan Savoyard: Bosél or Bozél) is a commune in the Savoie department in the Auvergne-Rhône-Alpes region in Southeastern France.

Bozel acts as a base village for the largest ski area in the world, Les Trois Vallées. Specifically in the valley of Courchevel. Bozel does not yet have a lift of any sort or any ski runs as it lies at 870m above sea level. However, there are now plans for there to be a gondola lift installed which will run to the village of Le Praz at 1060m and further on to Courchevel. The installment of the lift is currently in the planning and financing stage and has been delayed due to complaints from neighboring villages over fears of an increase in traffic to the region.

In the course of the French Revolution, it was briefly renamed Fructidor.

Bozel is also home to an important archeological site, "Le Chenet des Pierres" it is an archaeological site located near the hamlet of Les Moulins in Bozel, Tarentaise, at an altitude of 950 meters. It was occupied from 4600 to 2800 BC, a period corresponding to the Middle Neolithic and the first half of the Final Neolithic.

== Population ==
Historical population
Year	Pop.	±% p.a.
1968	1,380	—
1975	1,344	−0.38%
1982	1,504	+1.62%
1990	1,690	+1.47%
1999	1,854	+1.03%
2007	1,992	+0.90%
2012	2,019	+0.27%
2017	1,841	−1.83%
2023	2,098	+2.20%
Source: INSEE

== Gallery ==
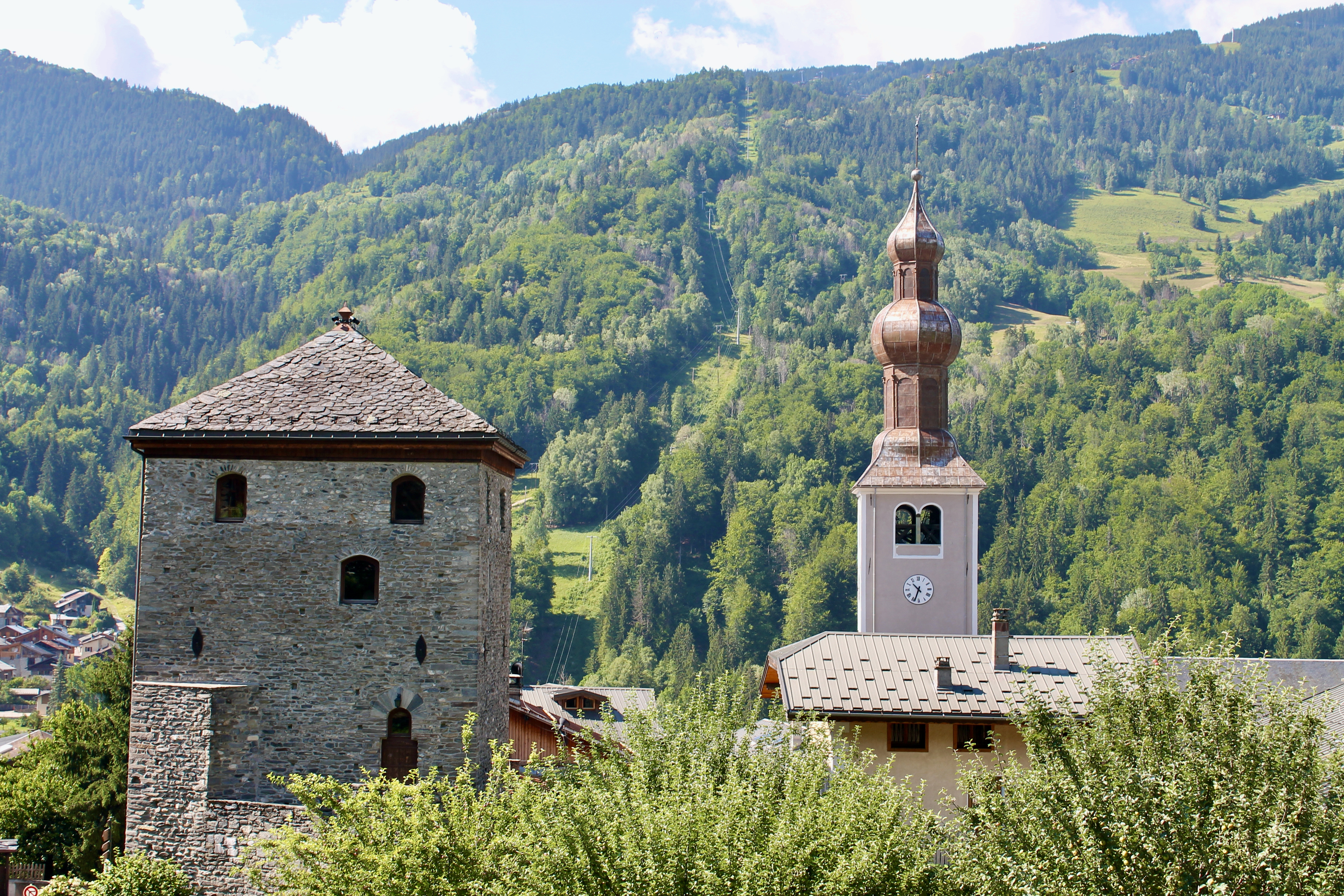
Tour de Bozel and Église Saint-François-de-Sales

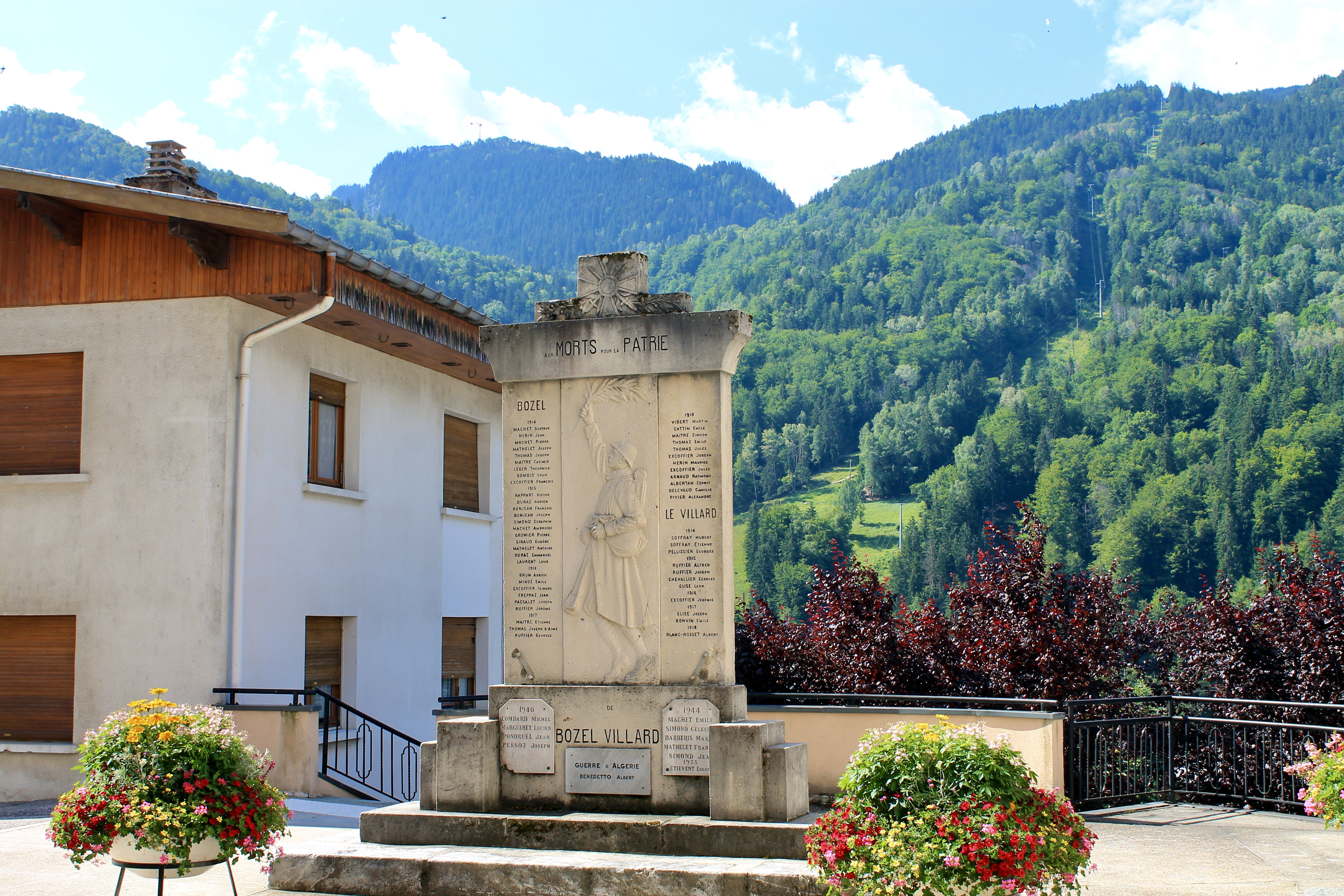
Monument aux morts

== See also ==
- Communes of the Savoie department
