= List of ski areas and resorts in Europe =

This is a list of ski areas and resorts in Europe.

== Albania ==
- Dardhë
- Pukë

== Andorra ==
- Grandvalira-Soldeu
- Grandvalira-El Tarter
- Grandvalira-Grau Roig
- Grandvalira - Pas de la Casa
- Vallnord - Arinsal
- Vallnord - Pal
- Vallnord - Ordino-Arcalis
- La Rabassa

== Armenia ==
- Ashotsk
- Jermuk
- Lernanist
- Tsakhkadzor

== Austria ==
=== Carinthia ===
- Arnoldstein - Dreiländereck
- Dobratsch - Villacher Alpe
- Gerlitzen
- Heiligenblut
- Innerkrems
- Katschberg
- Kleinkirchheim
- Koralpe
- Nassfeld - Hermagor
- Peca
- Petzen
- Simonhöhe
- Turracher Höhe

=== Lower Austria ===
- Annaberg
- Hochkar
- Mitterbach-Gemeindealpe
- Mönichkirchen
- Ötscher Lackenhof
- Semmering

=== Salzburg ===
- Annaberg im Lammertal
- Dachstein West (including Annaberg im Lammertal, Gosau, and Rußbach am Paß Gschütt)
- Gasteinertal (Bad Gastein, Bad Hofgastein, Sportgastein, Dorfgastein, Großarl)
- Hochkönig Ski Area (Maria Alm, Hintermoos, Hinterthal, Dienten am Hochkönig, and Mühlbach am Hochkönig)
- Lungau
- Obertauern
- Rauris
- Saalbach-Hinterglemm
- Salzburger Sportwelt Amadé (including Flachau, Kleinarl, Zauchensee, Altenmarkt, Radstadt, and Wagrein)
- Spielbergalm
- Zell am See (including Kaprun and Kitzsteinhorn)

=== Styria ===
- Aflenzer Bürgeralm
- Dachstein
- Grebenzen
- Haus im Ennstal
- Hebalm
- Hohentauern
- Kreischberg - Murau
- Lachtal
- Langenwang
- Präbichl
- Riesneralm
- Schladming
- Schöckl
- Semmering
- Stuhleck (Spital am Semmering)
- Tauplitz
- Turracher Höhe
- Weinebene

=== Tyrol ===
- Alpbach
- Axamer Lizum
- Innsbruck
- Ischgl – Galtür
- Kaunertal
- Kitzbühel (including Kirchberg in Tirol, Jochberg, Pass Thurn–Mittersill)
- Lienz
- Mayrhofen
- Ötztal
- Pitztal
- Sankt Anton am Arlberg
- Sankt Jakob in Defereggen
- Sankt Johann in Tirol
- Seefeld
- Stubaital
- SkiWelt Wilder Kaiser - Brixental (including Gosau, Scheffau, Ellmau)
- Wildschönau area (Niederau, Auffach, Oberau)
- Zillertal (including Hintertux)

=== Upper Austria ===
- Dachstein-West (Gosau)
- Feuerkogel
- Grünau im Almtal
- Hinterstoder
- Hochficht
- Krippenstein
- Loser
- Postalm

=== Vienna ===
- Hohe-Wand-Wiese

=== Vorarlberg ===
- Ski Arlberg (Lech, Zürs, Warth, Schröcken, Stuben am Arlberg)
- Brandnertal
- Bregenzerwald: Damüls-Mellau Ski Area
- Kleinwalsertal
- Silvretta Montafon
- Schruns–Tschagguns

== Azerbaijan ==
- Qabala - Tufandag Mountain Resort
- Qusar - Shahdag Mountain Resort

== Belarus ==
- Raǔbičy
- Silichy

== Belgium ==
- Baraque de Fraiture
- High Fens
- Mont des Brumes
- Ovifat

== Bosnia and Herzegovina ==
- Bjelašnica
- Brusnica recreational center
- Igman
- Igrišta
- Jahorina ski resort
- Kozara
- Kupres
- Oštrelj
- Risovac
- Rostovo ski center
- Rujište
- Vlasic

== Bulgaria ==
- Bansko
- Beklemeto
- Berkovitsa
- Bodrost
- Borovets
- Chepelare
- Chumerna
- Dobrinishte
- Govedartsi
- Karandila
- Kom Peak
- Malyovitsa
- Osogovo
- Pamporovo
- Panichishte
- Parshevitsa
- Semkovo
- Treshtenik
- Tsigov Chark
- Uzana
- Vitosha, Sofia

== Croatia ==
- Bjelolasica
- Medvednica
- Platak

== Cyprus ==
- Mount Olympus

== Czech Republic ==
- Churáňov, Šumava
- Harrachov
- Pec pod Sněžkou
- Špindlerův Mlýn

Mountains/ski resort	Max. alt.	Min. alt.	Slopes (ttl km.)
Beskydy
Bílá	776 m	530 m	4 km
Bůřov	740 m	620 m	1 km
Dolní Lomná	705 m	520 m	1 km
Javorový vrch	968 m	424 m	1 km
Kasárna	1030 m	890 m	1 km
Pustevny	1098 m	620 m	8 km
Soláň	860 m	750 m	4 km
Českomor. vrch.
Velké Meziříčí - Fajtův kopec	550 m	470 m	1 km
Jeseníky
Červenohor. sedlo	1165 m	862 m	5 km
Klepáčov	850 m	740 m	1 km
Ovčárna - Praděd	1445 m	1200 m	5 km
Petříkov	952 m	740 m	3 km
Ramzová	1351 m	782 m	8 km
Jizerské hory
Bedřichův	805 m	695 m	6 km
Ještěd - Liberec	944 m	500 m	9 km
Josefův Důl	860 m	600 m	2 km
Severák	804 m	700 m	4 km
Špičák u Tanvaldu	831 m	540 m	6 km
Krkonoše
Benecko	950 m	610 m	4 km
Černý Důl	1001 m	600 m	9 km
Herlíkovice - Žalý	1000 m	540 m	11 km
Kamenec - Jablonec n. J.	672 m	450 m	3 km
Medvědín	1235 m	990 m	12 km
Mladé Buky	580 m	470 m	5 km
Špindlerův Mlýn	1310 m	715 m	25 km
Vítkovice	865 m	733 m	5 km
Žacléř - Prkenný Důl	850 m	600 m	6 km
Černá hora - Janské Lázně	1245 m	640 m	12 km
Malá Úpa	1210 m	780 m	2 km
Pec pod Sněžkou	1215 m	830 m	10 km
Harrachov	1022 m	650 m	9 km
Paseky nad Jizerou	860 m	626 m	10 km
Rejdice - Kořenov	850 m	700 m	1 km
Rokytnice n. Jiz.	1312 m	630 m	16 km
Krušné hory
Bouřňák	869 m	589 m	6 km
Boží Dar - Neklid	1099 m	850 m	7 km
Bublava	802 m	690 m	2 km
Klínovec	1244 m	860 m	10 km
Nové Hamry	830 m	720 m	2 km
Telnice	796 m	596 m	4 km
Orlické hory
Čenkovice	958 m	750 m	3 km
Deštné v Orlick. horách	980 m	610 m	6 km
Říčky v Orlic. horách	990 m	740 m	4 km
Šumava
Kašperské Hory	794 m	700 m	1 km
Lipno - Kramolín	890 m	750 m	6 km
Nové Hutě	1140 m	1000 m	2 km
Špičák	1202 m	880 m	7 km
Zadov - Churáňov	1110 m	890 m	5 km

== Denmark ==
- Copenhill
- Gjern

== Estonia ==
- Otepää
- Võru
- Kiviõli
- Viimsi

== Finland ==
- Himos
- Iso-Syöte
- Juupavaara
- Kalpalinna
- Koli
- Laajavuori
- Levi
- Luosto
- Mustavaara
- Olos
- Paljakka
- Pallas
- Purnu
- Pyhätunturi
- Ritavalkea
- Ruka
- Ruosniemi
- Ruunarinne
- Salomonkallio
- Sappee
- Saukkovaara
- Sieves
- Suomu
- Syötekeskus
- Tahko
- Taivalvaara
- Talma Ski
- Ukkohalla
- Uuperi
- Vihti
- Vuokatti
- Vuorenmaa
- Ylläs

== France ==
=== French Alps ===
Alpes-de-Haute-Provence (04)

- Chabanon: 11 ski lifts, 29 ski slopes
- Le Fanget: 33 km of cross-country skiing
- Le Grand Puy: 7 ski lifts, 14 ski slopes (20 km), 10 km of cross-country skiing
- Pra-Loup: 29 ski lifts, 43 ski slopes (167 km)
- Saint-Jean Montclar: 15 ski lifts, 31 ski slopes (45 km)
- Sainte-Anne la Condamine: 8 ski lifts, 15 ski slopes
- Super Sauze: 18 ski lifts, 36 ski slopes (65 km)
- Val d'Allos – La Foux: 50 ski lifts, 80 ski slopes
- Val d'Allos – Le Seignus: 11 ski lifts, 25 ski slopes (50 km)

Hautes-Alpes (05)

- Abriès-Ristolas: 5 ski lifts, 13 ski slopes (27 km), 40 km of cross-country skiing
- Aiguille: 5 ski slopes
- Ancelle: 14 ski slopes (28 km), 30 km of cross-country skiing
- Arvieux: 5 ski lifts, 12 ski slopes (17 km), 45 km of cross-country skiing
- Ceillac: 7 ski lifts, 12 ski slopes (22 km), 45 km of cross-country skiing
- Chaillol: 13 ski slopes (13 km), 31 km of cross-country skiing
- Château-Ville-Vieille: 2 ski lifts, 3 ski slopes (2 km), 10 km of cross-country skiing
- Le Chazelet: 6 ski slopes (7 km)
- Crévoux: 11 ski slopes (16 km), 45 km of cross-country skiing
- Dévoluy (SuperDévoluy-La Joue du Loup): 60 ski slopes (100 km), 35 km of cross-country skiing
- Gap Céüze: 17 ski slopes (25 km)
- La Grave: 2 ski slopes (25 km), 20 km of cross-country skiing
- Laye: 8 ski slopes (7 km)
- Montgenèvre: 84 ski slopes (100 km), 28 km of cross-country skiing
- Orcières-Merlette: 53 ski slopes (100 km), 25 km of cross-country skiing
- Les Orres: 34 ski slopes (88 km), 30 km of cross-country skiing
- Pelvoux-Vallouise: 14 ski slopes (34 km), 30 km of cross-country skiing
- Puy Saint-Vincent: 34 ski slopes (75 km), 30 km of cross-country skiing
- Réallon: 16 ski slopes (30 km), 25 km of cross-country skiing
- Risoul: 118 ski slopes (180 km), 30 km of cross-country skiing
- Saint-Léger-les-Mélèzes: 24 ski slopes (25 km), 30 km of cross-country skiing
- Saint-Véran: 28 ski slopes (36 km)
- Serre-Chevalier: 111 ski slopes (250 km), 60 km of cross-country skiing
- Vars: 118 ski slopes (180 km), 40 km of cross-country skiing

Alpes-Maritimes (06)

- L'Audibergue: 7 ski lifts, 21 ski slopes (22 km), cross-country skiing
- Auron Saint-Étienne-de-Tinée: 21 ski lifts, 42 ski slopes (135 km), cross-country skiing
- Beuil-les-Launes: 22 ski lifts, 53 ski slopes (90 km), cross-country skiing
- Estenc-Entraunes: 1 ski lift, 1 ski slope
- Gréolières-les-Neiges: 9 ski lifts, 22 ski slopes (30 km), cross-country skiing
- Isola 2000: 22 ski lifts, 41 ski slopes (120 km)
- Peira-Cava: 1 ski lift, 1 ski slope
- Roubion-les-Buisses: 8 ski lifts, 21 ski slopes (30 km), cross-country skiing
- Turini-Camp-d'Argent: 4 ski lifts, 4 ski slopes
- Val Pelens: 3 ski lifts, 8 ski slopes (10 km), cross-country skiing
- Valberg: 22 ski lifts, 52 ski slopes (90 km), cross-country skiing
- Valdeblore: 7 ski lifts, 20 ski slopes (30 km)

Drôme (26)

- Col de Rousset: 10 ski lifts, 29 ski slopes (35 km), 12 km of cross-country skiing
- Font d'Urle: 9 ski lifts, 16 ski slopes (18 km), 80 km of cross-country skiing
- Grand Echaillon: 50 km of cross-country skiing
- Herbouilly: 138 km of cross-country skiing
- La Jarjatte: 5 ski lifts, 6 ski slopes (6 km), 20 km of cross-country skiing
- Lente: 96 km of cross-country skiing
- Valdrôme: 5 ski lifts, 10 ski slopes (10 km), 10 km of cross-country skiing

Isère (38)

- Allemont: 20 km of cross-country skiing
- L'Alpe d'Huez: 84 ski lifts, 123 ski slopes (249), 50 km of cross-country skiing
- L'Alpe-du-Grand-Serre: 15 ski lifts, 30 ski slopes (55 km), 20 km of cross-country skiing
- Auris-en-Oisans: 15 ski lifts, 20 ski slopes (45 km), 8 km of cross-country skiing
- Autrans: 16 ski lifts, 20 ski slopes (20 km), 160 km of cross-country skiing
- Le Barioz: 52 km of cross-country skiing
- Bourg-d'Oisans: 50 km of cross-country skiing
- Chamrousse: 23 ski lifts, 46 ski slopes (92 km), 40 km of cross-country skiing
- Chichilianne: 44 km of cross-country skiing
- Col de l'Arzelier: 5 ski lifts, 7 ski slopes (9 km), 35 km of cross-country skiing
- Col de Porte: 11 ski lifts, 11 ski slopes, 57 km of cross-country skiing
- Col de Romeyère: 3 ski lifts, 6 ski slopes (5 km), 50 km of cross-country skiing
- Col d'Ornon: 3 ski lifts, 6 ski slopes (8 km), 26 km of cross-country skiing
- Le Collet d'Allevard: 11 ski lifts, 20 ski slopes (35 km)
- Les Deux Alpes: 48 ski lifts, 102 ski slopes (220 km), 5 km of cross-country skiing
- La Grave: 8 ski lifts, 10 ski slopes, 21 km of cross-country skiing
- Gresse-en-Vercors: 13 ski lifts, 19 ski slopes, 40 km of cross-country skiing
- Lans-en-Vercors: 12 ski lifts, 15 ski slopes (30 km), 70 km of cross-country skiing
- Méaudre: 10 ski lifts, 13 ski slopes (18 km), 100 km of cross-country skiing
- La Motte-d'Aveillans: 1 ski lift, 3 ski slopes (2 km), 28 km of cross-country skiing
- Oz-en-Oisans: 20 ski lifts, 41 ski slopes (68 km), 30 km of cross-country skiing
- La Ruchère-St-Christophe: 35 km of cross-country skiing
- Saint-Bernard-du-Touvet/Col de Marcieu: 6 ski slopes
- Saint-Hilaire-du-Touvet: 10 ski slopes
- Saint-Nizier-du-Moucherotte: 1 ski lift, 2 ski slopes (1 km)
- Saint-Pierre-de-Chartreuse: 15 ski lifts, 24 ski slopes (35), 50 km of cross-country skiing
- Le Sappey en Chartreuse
- Les sept Laux: 21 ski lifts, 35 ski slopes (120 km), 23 km of cross-country skiing
- Tréminis: 38 km of cross-country skiing
- Vaujany: 20 ski lifts, 41 ski slopes (68 km), 28 km of cross-country skiing
- Venosc-Vénéon: 27 km of cross-country skiing
- Villard-de-Lans: 27 ski lifts, 30 ski slopes (125 km), 130 km of cross-country skiing
- Villard-Reculas: 7 ski lifts, 6 ski slopes (20 km)

Savoie (73)

- Les Aillons: 20 ski lifts, 38 ski slopes (42 km), 40 km of cross-country skiing
- Albiez: 12 ski lifts, 22 ski slopes (40 km), 30 km of cross-country skiing
- Les Arcs: 42 ski lifts, 67 ski slopes (150 km), 15 km of cross-country skiing
- Arèches: 15 ski lifts, 29 ski slopes (50 km), 49 km of cross-country skiing
- Aussois: 12 ski lifts, 23 ski slopes (55 km), 34 km of cross-country skiing
- Bessans: 4 ski lifts, 4 ski slopes (5 km), 80 km of cross-country skiing
- Bonneval sur Arc: 11 ski lifts, 19 ski slopes (25 km)
- Bramans: 1 ski lift, 1 ski slope (1 km), 40 km of cross-country skiing
- Brides-les-Bains: 49 ski lifts, 74 ski slopes (150 km)
- Champagny-en-Vanoise: 134 ski slopes (225 km), 30 km of cross-country skiing
- Le Corbier: 28 ski lifts, 28 ski slopes (90 km)
- Courchevel: 59 ski lifts, 124 ski slopes (150 km), 67 km of cross-country skiing
- Crest-Voland: 16 ski lifts, 28 ski slopes (35 km), 80 km of cross-country skiing
- Doucy-Combelouvière: 33 ski lifts, 55 ski slopes (93 km), 30 km of cross-country skiing
- Les Entremonts: 3 ski lifts, 5 ski slopes, 49 km of cross-country skiing
- Feclaz-Saint-François: 13 ski lifts, 28 ski slopes (50 km), 140 km of cross-country skiing
- Flumet: 8 ski lifts, 20 ski slopes, 3 km of cross-country skiing
- La Giettaz: 8 ski lifts, 14 ski slopes (22 km), 6 km of cross-country skiing
- Granier: 4 ski lifts, 5 ski slopes, 40 km of cross-country skiing
- Héry-sur-Ugine: 2 ski lifts, 3 ski slopes, 62 km of cross-country skiing
- Les Karellis: 17 ski lifts, 28 ski slopes (60 km), 30 km of cross-country skiing
- Les Menuires: 42 ski lifts, 73 ski slopes (150 km), 28 km of cross-country skiing
- Méribel: 53 ski lifts, 74 ski slopes (150 km), 33 km of cross-country skiing
- Monchavin: 54 ski lifts, 134 ski slopes (225 km), 16 km of cross-country skiing
- La Norma: 18 ski lifts, 27 ski slopes (65 km), 30 km of cross-country skiing
- Notre-Dame-de-Bellecombe: 19 ski lifts, 27 ski slopes, 8 km of cross-country skiing
- Orelle: 4 ski lifts, 8 ski slopes, 20 km of cross-country skiing
- Peisey-Vallandry: 54 ski lifts, 105 ski slopes (200 km), 44 km of cross-country skiing
- La Plagne: 108 ski lifts, 134 ski slopes (225 km), 85 km of cross-country skiing
- La Planolet: 16 ski lifts, 24 ski slopes (35 km), 50 km of cross-country skiing
- Pralognan-la-Vanoise: 12 ski lifts, 22 ski slopes (35 km), 25 km of cross-country skiing
- La Rosière: 15 ski lifts, 74 ski slopes (150 km), 5 km of cross-country skiing
- Saint-Colomban: 7 ski lifts, 14 ski slopes (30 km), 10 km of cross-country skiing
- Saint-François-Longchamp: 16 ski lifts, 27 ski slopes (65 km), 35 km of cross-country skiing
- Saint-Jean-d'Arves: 4 ski lifts, 28 ski slopes (90 km)
- Saint-Martin-de-Belleville: 40 ski lifts, 73 ski slopes (160 km), 56 km of cross-country skiing
- Saint-Sorlin-d'Arves: 20 ski lifts, 30 ski slopes (120 km)
- Sainte-Foy Tarentaise: 5 ski lifts, 15 ski slopes (30 km)
- Les Saisies: 34 ski lifts, 40 ski slopes (35 km), 80 km of cross-country skiing
- Sollières-Sardières: 6 ski lifts, 14 ski slopes (35 km), 35 km of cross-country skiing
- La Tania: 64 ski lifts, 124 ski slopes (150 km), 30 km of cross-country skiing
- Termignon: 6 ski lifts, 14 ski slopes (35 km), 35 km of cross-country skiing
- Tignes: 42 ski lifts, 67 ski slopes (150 km)
- La Toussuire: 22 ski lifts, 33 ski slopes (45 km), 27 km of cross-country skiing
- Val Cenis: 17 ski lifts, 43 ski slopes (80 km), 8 km of cross-country skiing
- Val d'Isère: 41 ski lifts, 154 ski slopes (150 km), 20 km of cross-country skiing
- Val Thorens: 27 ski lifts, 68 ski slopes (150 km)
- Valfréjus: 13 ski lifts, 23 ski slopes (65 km), 2 km of cross-country skiing
- Valloire: 34 ski lifts, 85 ski slopes (150 km), 30 km of cross-country skiing
- Valmorel: 49 ski lifts, 55 ski slopes (150 km), 20 km of cross-country skiing
- Villaroger: 3 ski lifts, 5 ski slopes (10 km), 5 km of cross-country skiing

Haute-Savoie (74)

- Argentière: 9 ski lifts, 11 ski slopes
- Avoriaz: 21 ski lifts, 49 ski slopes (150 km), 47 km of cross-country skiing
- Bellevaux: 6 ski lifts, 11 ski slopes, 47 km of cross-country skiing
- Bernex: 15 ski lifts, 16 ski slopes, 8 km of cross-country skiing
- Les Brasses: 14 ski lifts, 14 ski slopes, 50 km of cross-country skiing
- Les Carroz: 15 ski lifts, 30 ski slopes, 45 km of cross-country skiing
- Chamonix-La Flegère: 7 ski lifts, 16 ski slopes
- Chamonix-Le Brévents: 11 ski lifts, 14 ski slopes (25 km)
- La Chapelle-d'Abondance: 19 ski lifts, 16 ski slopes (50 km), 35 km of cross-country skiing
- Châtel: 41 ski lifts, 47 ski slopes (83 km), 57 km of cross-country skiing
- La Clusaz: 55 ski lifts, 84 ski slopes, 50 km of cross-country skiing
- Combloux: 12 ski lifts, 13 ski slopes, 13 km of cross-country skiing
- Les Contamines-Montjoie: 24 ski lifts, 48 ski slopes (83 km), 26 km of cross-country skiing
- Cordon: 6 ski lifts, 12 ski slopes, 10 km of cross-country skiing
- Flaine: 22 ski lifts, 50 ski slopes (170 km)
- Les Gets: 26 ski lifts, 44 ski slopes, 33 km of cross-country skiing
- Le Grand Bornand: 31 ski lifts, 43 ski slopes (90 km), 75 km of cross-country skiing
- La Grande Terche: 8 ski lifts, 9 ski slopes, 12 km of cross-country skiing
- Les Haberes: 9 ski lifts, 18 ski slopes, 23 km of cross-country skiing
- Les Houches: 19 ski lifts, 27 ski slopes (55 km), 3 km of cross-country skiing
- Le Jaillet: 75 km of cross-country skiing
- Les Lindarets: 21 ski lifts, 49 ski slopes (150 km), 47 km of cross-country skiing
- Manigod: 17 ski lifts, 26 ski slopes (25 km), 17 km of cross-country skiing
- Mégève: 30 ski lifts, 160 ski slopes, 75 km of cross-country skiing
- Mont-Saxonnex: 8 ski lifts, 12 ski slopes (15 km), 5 km of cross-country skiing
- Montmin: 2 ski lifts, 5 ski slopes, 12 km of cross-country skiing
- Morillon: 8 ski lifts, 16 ski slopes
- Morzine: 22 ski lifts, 34 ski slopes (45 km), 40 km of cross-country skiing
- Orange: 3 ski lifts, 5 ski slopes, 14 km of cross-country skiing
- Passy: 6 ski lifts, 6 ski slopes (12 km), 12 km of cross-country skiing
- Plaines-Joux: 40 km of cross-country skiing
- Praz de Lys: 23 ski lifts, 41 ski slopes (40 km), 60 km of cross-country skiing
  - Praz de Lys-Sommand
- Praz sur Arly: 6 ski lifts, 26 ski slopes (35 km), 10 km of cross-country skiing
- Le Reposoir: 5 ski lifts, 7 ski slopes, 12 km of cross-country skiing
- Romme-sur-Cluses: 4 ski lifts, 4 ski slopes (4 km)
- Saint-Gervais: 16 ski lifts, 28 ski slopes, 28 km of cross-country skiing
- Saint-Jean-d'Aulps
- Saint-Jean-de-Sixt: 2 ski lifts, 13 ski slopes, 21 km of cross-country skiing
- Saint-Nicolas-de-Véroce: 10 ski lifts, 6 ski slopes, 28 km of cross-country skiing
- Samoëns: 16 ski lifts, 29 ski slopes, 90 km of cross-country skiing
- Le Semnoz: 12 ski lifts, 18 ski slopes (15 km), 46 km of cross-country skiing
- Seythenex: 4 ski lifts, 8 ski slopes (34 km), 29 km of cross-country skiing
- Sixt-Fer à Cheval: 2 ski lifts, 12 ski slopes (34 km), 90 km of cross-country skiing
- Sommand: 26 ski lifts, 51 ski slopes (60 km), 60 km of cross-country skiing
- Thollon-les-Memises: 13 ski lifts, 17 ski slopes (52 km), 6 km of cross-country skiing
- La Tour Charamillon: 10 ski lifts, 21 ski slopes
- Vallorcine: 3 ski lifts, 4 ski slopes, 16 km of cross-country skiing

Vaucluse (84)

- Chalet Reynard: 2 ski lifts
- Mont Serein: 9 ski lifts, 15 ski slopes (12 km), 7 km of cross-country skiing

Clustered resorts

- Aravis Range — La Clusaz, Le Grand-Bornand
- Espace Diamant — Crest-Voland, Cohennoz, Flumet, Notre-Dame-de-Bellecombe, Praz-sur-Arly and Les Saisies
- Espace Killy — Val d'Isère, Tignes
- Évasion Mont-Blanc — Combloux, Megève, Saint-Gervais, Saint-Nicolas-de-Véroce, Les Contamines-Montjoie
- La forêt blanche — Risoul, Vars
- Le Grand Domaine — Saint-François-Longchamp, Valmorel
- Grand massif — Flaine, Les Carroz d'Arâches, Morillon, Samoëns, Sixt Fer a Cheval
- Les Grandes Rousses — Alpe d'Huez, Vaujany, Auris-en-Oisans, Oz-en-Oisans, Villard-Reculas
- Paradiski — Les Arcs, La Plagne, Peisey-Vallandry
- Portes du Soleil — Avoriaz, Morzine, Les Gets, Châtel, Saint-Jean-d'Aulps and La Chapelle-d'Abondance plus in Switzerland Morgins, Torgon, Champoussin, Les Crosets and Champéry
- Les Sybelles — Le Corbier, La Toussuire, Les Bottières, Saint-Jean-d'Arves, Saint-Sorlin-d'Arves, Saint-Colomban-des-Villards
- Les Trois Vallées — Courchevel, Méribel, La Tania, Brides-les-Bains, Saint-Martin-de-Belleville, Les Menuires, Val Thorens and Orelle

=== Corsica ===
- Ghisoni: 3 ski lifts, 7 ski slopes
- Val d'Ese: 3 ski lifts, 4 ski slopes
- Vergio: 6 ski lifts, 7 ski slopes

=== Jura Mountains ===
- Bellefontaine: 3 ski lifts, 3 ski slopes, 70 km of cross-country skiing
- Bois d'Amont: 52 km of cross-country skiing
- Cerniébaud: 60 km of cross-country skiing
- Chapelle-des-Bois: 110 km of cross-country skiing
- Charquemont: 3 ski lifts, 3 ski slopes, 40 km of cross-country skiing
- Châteleu: 2 ski lifts, 2 ski slopes, 47 km of cross-country skiing
- La Chaux-de-Gilley: 51 km of cross-country skiing
- Chaux-Neuve: 2 ski lifts, 2 ski slopes, 68 km of cross-country skiing, 1 ski jumping
- Foncine-le-Haut: 1 ski lift, 1 ski slope, 60 km of cross-country skiing, 1 ski jumping
- Les Fourgs: 5 ski lifts, 9 ski slopes, 100 km of cross-country skiing
- La Fuvelle: 95 km of cross-country skiing
- Gilley: 2 ski lifts, 2 ski slopes, 35 km of cross-country skiing
- Grande-Rivière: 2 ski lifts, 2 ski slopes, 24 km of cross-country skiing
- Lajoux: 1 ski lift, 2 ski slopes, 28 km of cross-country skiing
- Lamoura: 10 ski lifts, 11 ski slopes, 60 km of cross-country skiing
- Le Larmont: 3 ski lifts, 3 ski slopes, 33 km of cross-country skiing
- Le Laveron: 51 km of cross-country skiing
- La Loge des Gardes: 4 ski slopes (2 km), 15 km of cross-country skiing
- Longchaumois: 2 ski lifts, 3 ski slopes, 25 km of cross-country skiing
- Longcochon: 55 km of cross-country skiing
- Maîche: 50 km of cross-country skiing
- Métabief Mont d'Or: 22 ski lifts, 27 ski slopes(40 km), 120 km of cross-country skiing
- Mignovillard: 60 km of cross-country skiing
- Montbenoît: 50 km of cross-country skiing
- Monts Jura (Lélex-Mijoux) : 30 ski lifts, 34 ski slopes(50 km), 140 km of cross-country skiing
- Mont Meusy: 4 ski lifts, 4 ski slopes, 20 km of cross-country skiing
- Morbier: 2 ski lifts, 3 ski slopes, 35 km of cross-country skiing, 1 biathlon stadium
- Les Moussières: 2 ski lifts, 2 ski slopes, 18 km of cross-country skiing
- Mouthe: 3 ski lifts, 3 ski slopes, 65 km of cross-country skiing
- La Pesse: 1 ski lifts, 1 ski slopes, 60 km of cross-country skiing
- Prémanon: 12 ski lifts, 13 ski slopes, 56 km of cross-country skiing
- Prénovel: 1 ski lift, 2 ski slopes, 68 km of cross-country skiing
- Les Rousses: 18 ski lifts, 19 ski slopes, 44 km of cross-country skiing
- Septmoncel: 3 ski lifts, 3 ski slopes, 7 km of cross-country skiing

=== Massif Central ===
- L'Areilloux Mézilhac: 2 ski lifts, 3 ski slopes (3 km)
- La Bourboule: 21 km of cross-country skiing
- Les Bouviers: 27 km of cross-country skiing
- Brameloup: 9 ski lifts, 10 ski slopes, 45 km of cross-country skiing
- La Chaise Dieu: 80 km of cross-country skiing
- Chalmazel: 8 ski lifts, 16 ski slopes, 16 km of cross-country skiing
- Chambon-sur-Lac: 35 km of cross-country skiing
- Chastreix: 8 ski lifts, 16 ski slopes, 15 km of cross-country skiing
- La Chavade Bel Air: 70 km of cross-country skiing
- Col de Légal: 43 km of cross-country skiing
- La Croix de Bauzon: 9 ski lifts, 9 ski slopes, 30 km of cross-country skiing
- Égliseneuve-d'Entraigues: 40 km of cross-country skiing
- Les Estables: 8 ski slopes, cross-country skiing
- Guéry: 35 km of cross-country skiing
- Haut-Pilat: 2 ski lifts, 80 km of cross-country skiing
- Laguiole: 12 ski lifts, 15 ski slopes, 50 km of cross-country skiing
- Laubert: 57 km of cross-country skiing
- Le Lioran: 22 ski lifts, 46 ski slopes(60 km), 140 km of cross-country skiing
- Mas de la Barque: 27 km of cross-country skiing
- Mont Aigoual: 12 ski lifts, 15 ski slopes, 60 km of cross-country skiing
- Mont-Dore: 20 ski lifts, 33 ski slopes (42 km), 25 km of cross-country skiing
- Mont Lozère: 5 ski lifts, 7 ski slopes, 18 km of cross-country skiing
- Montivernoux: 10 km of cross-country skiing
- Murol: 35 km of cross-country skiing
- Nasbinals: 1 ski lifts, 3 ski slopes, 49 km of cross-country skiing
- Picherande: 15 km of cross-country skiing
- Saint-Anthème: 87 km of cross-country skiing
- Saint-Urcize: 3 ski lifts, 3 ski slopes, 50 km of cross-country skiing
- Super-Besse: 22 ski lifts, 25 ski slopes(45 km), 125 km of cross-country skiing

=== Morvan (Burgundy) ===
- Station du Haut-Folin: 40 km of cross-country skiing

=== Pyrenees ===
- Les Angles: 16 ski lifts, 40 km of cross-country skiing
- Arette-La Pierre St. Martin: 13 ski lifts, 56 km of cross-country skiing
- Artouste: 18 ski lifts
- Ascou-Pailhères: 6 ski lifts
- Ax 3 Domaines: 17 ski lifts, 198 snow cannons, 85 km
- Bareges/La Mongie: 43 ski lifts, 16 km of cross-country skiing
- Beille: 70 km of cross-country skiing
- Bourg d'oueil: 3 ski lifts, 14 km of cross-country skiing
- Camurac: 7 ski lifts, 10 km of cross-country skiing
- Cauterets: 11 ski lifts, 14 km of cross-country skiing
- Domaine du Chioula
- Err-Puigmal: 13 ski lifts
- Espace Cambre d'Aze: 17 ski lifts
- Espace nordique du Capcir
- Etang de Lers: 60 km of cross-country skiing
- Font-Romeu: 25 ski lifts, 111 km of cross-country skiing
- Formiguères: 6 ski lifts
- Gavarnie-Gèdre: 11 ski lifts, 7 km of cross-country skiing
- Goulier-Neige: 4 ski lifts
- Gourette: 12 ski lifts
- Guzet-Neige: 14 ski lifts, 3 km of cross-country skiing
- Hautacam
- Iraty
- Issarbe
- Luz Ardiden: 15 ski lifts, 5 km of cross-country skiing
- Mijanès-Donezan: 5 ski lifts, 25 km of cross-country skiing
- Les Monts d'Olmes: 11 ski lifts
- Le Mourtis: 10 ski lifts, 15 km of cross-country skiing
- Nistos: 48 km of cross-country skiing
- Payolle: 50 km of cross-country skiing
- Peyragudes: 18 ski lifts
- Piau-Engaly: 17 ski lifts
- La Pierre Saint-Martin: 14 ski lifts, 25 km of cross-country skiing
- Porté-Puymorens: 12 ski lifts
- Puyvalador: 7 ski lifts
- Saint-Lary-Soulan: 32 ski lifts
- Somport: 34 km of cross-country skiing
- Superbagnères: 15 ski lifts, 3 km of cross-country skiing
- Val d'Azun: 110 km of cross-country skiing
- Val Louron: 10 ski lifts, 15 km of cross-country skiing

=== Vosges ===
- Ballon d'Alsace: 11 ski lifts, 14 ski slopes, 45 km of cross-country skiing
- Brabant (La Bresse): 3 ski lifts, 5 ski slopes, 28 km of cross-country skiing
- La Bresse: 30 ski lifts, 39 ski slopes
- Bussang: 7 ski lifts, 11 ski slopes, 21 km of cross-country skiing
- Champ du Feu: 13 ski lifts, 17 ski slopes, 51 km of cross-country skiing
- Col des Bagenelles: 2 ski lifts, 3 ski slopes, 56 km of cross-country skiing
- Cornimont: 28 km of cross-country skiing
- Donon: 65 km of cross-country skiing
- Frenz: 4 ski lift, 4 ski slope
- Le Gaschney: 4 ski lifts, 9 ski slopes
- Gérardmer: 20 ski lifts, 20 ski slopes (40 km), 40 km of cross-country skiing
- Girmont-Val-d'Ajol: 40 km of cross-country skiing
- Le Grand Ballon: 5 ski lifts, 6 ski slopes, 7 km of cross-country skiing
- Le Haut-du-Tôt: 30 km of cross-country skiing
- Lac Blanc: 10 ski lifts, 15 ski slopes, 78 km of cross-country skiing
- Lispach: 5 ski lifts, 7 ski slopes, 50 km of cross-country skiing
- Le Markstein: 9 ski lifts, 9 ski slopes, 30 km of cross-country skiing
- La Planche-des-Belles-Filles: 3 ski lifts, 5 ski slopes, 45 km of cross-country skiing
- Rochesson: 1 ski lift, 1 ski slope, 30 km of cross-country skiing
- Saint-Maurice-sur-Moselle: 8 ski lifts, 12 ski slopes, 21 km of cross-country skiing
- La Schlucht: 4 ski lifts, 4 ski slopes
- Schlumpf: 2 ski lifts, 3 ski slopes
- Le Schnepfenried: 7 ski lifts, 11 ski slopes, 20 km of cross-country skiing
- Le Tanet: 4 ski lifts, 6 ski slopes
- Les Trois-Fours: 13 km of cross-country skiing
- Le Valtin: 3 ski lifts, 3 ski slopes, 15 km of cross-country skiing
- Ventron: 8 ski lifts, 10 ski slopes, 16 km of cross-country skiing
- Wangenbourg-Engenthal: 75 km of cross-country skiing
- Xonrupt-Longemer: 2 ski lifts, 5 ski slopes, 45 km of cross-country skiing

== Georgia ==
- Bakuriani
- Goderdzi Pass
- Gudauri
- Mestia

== Germany ==
=== Allgäu ===
- Garmisch-Partenkirchen
- Oberammergau
- Oberstdorf

=== Bavarian Forest ===
==== State of Bavaria ====
- Zwiesel

=== Black Forest ===
==== State of Baden-Württemberg ====
- Achertal
- Baiersbronn
- Belchenland
- Breitnau
- Feldberg
- Furtwangen
- Gersbach
- Herrischried
- Hinterzarten
- Oberried
- Sankt Georgen
- Sasbachwalden
- Schonach
- Schönwald
- Seebach
- Todtmoos
- Todtnau
- Triberg

=== Harz mountains ===
==== State of Lower Saxony ====
- Altenau (Torfhaus)
- Bad Sachsa (Ravensberg)
- Braunlage (Wurmberg)
- Clausthal-Zellerfeld
- Hahnenklee
- Hohegeiß
- Osterode-Lerbach
- Sankt Andreasberg (Matthias-Schmidt-Berg and Sonnenberg)
- Schulenberg

=== Mangfallgebirge ===
==== State of Bavaria ====
- Sudelfeld

=== Rothaargebirge ===
==== State of North Rhine-Westphalia ====
- Winterberg

=== Sauerland ===
==== State of North Rhine-Westphalia ====
- Willingen

=== Swabian Jura ===
==== State of Baden-Württemberg ====
- Aalen
- Albstadt-Tailfingen
- Genkingen
- Römerstein
- Westerheim
- Wiesensteig

== Greece ==
- 3-5 Pigadia
- Elatochori
- Falakro
- Gerodovrahos
- Kalavrita
- Karpenisi
- Lailias
- Mainalo
- Metsovo
- Olympus
- Pagaio
- Parnassos
- Pertouli
- Pilio
- Pisoderi
- Seli
- Vasilitsa
- Vitsi
- Voras - Kaimakchalan

== Hungary ==
- Bánkút, in the Bükk mountains
- Eplény
- Kékes
- Mátraszentimre

== Iceland ==
- Bláfjöll
- Böggvistaðarfjall
- Dalirnir Tveir
- Hlíðarfjall
- Skálafell
- Skarðsdalur
- Tindastóll

== Italy ==
=== Piedmont ===
- Ala di Stura
- Alagna Valsesia
- Alpe di Mera
- Aquila di Giaveno
- Argentera
- Balme
- Bardonecchia
- Bielmonte
- Crissolo
- Entracque
- Frabosa Soprana
- Frabosa Sottana (Artesina, Prato Nevoso)
- Garessio 2000
- Limone Piemonte
- Lurisia
- Neveazzurra ski resort (Alpe Devero, Antrona Cheggio, Ceppo Morelli, Domobianca, Druogno, Formazza, Macugnaga, Mottarone, Piana di Vigezzo, Pian di Sole, San Domenico di Varzo)
- Oropa
- Pian del Frais
- Pontechianale
- Prali
- Rucas
- Sampeyre
- San Giacomo di Roburent
- Usseglio
- Valdieri
- Via Lattea (Cesana-Sansicario, Claviere, Oulx, Pragelato, Sauze d'Oulx, Sestriere)

=== Liguria ===
- Monesi di Triora (temporarily closed in 2025)
- Santo Stefano d'Aveto

=== Aosta Valley ===
- Ayas (Antagnod)
- Breuil-Cervinia
- Brusson
- Chamois
- Champoluc
- Champorcher
- Cogne
- Col de Joux
- Courmayeur
- Gressoney-La-Trinité
- Gressoney-Saint-Jean
- La Magdeleine
- Pila (Chamolé)
- Punta Helbronner
- Saint-Barthélemy
- Saint-Rhémy-en-Bosses (Crévacol)
- La Thuile
- Torgnon
- Valgrisenche
- Valsavarenche
- Valtournenche

=== Lombardy ===
- Aprica
- Bormio (Stelvio) - Valdisotto
- Borno
- Carona
- Chiesa in Valmalenco
- Colere (Malga Polzone)
- Foppolo
- Gerola Alta (Pescegallo)
- Gromo
- Lanzada
- Livigno
- Lizzola
- Madesimo
- Montecampione
- Pian delle Betulle
- Piani di Artavaggio
- Piani di Bobbio
- Piazzatorre
- Ponte di Legno (Tonale)
- Pora Cima
- Presolana
- San Colombano
- San Simone
- Schilpario
- Teglio
- Temù
- Valchiavenna
- Valfurva (Santa Caterina di Valfurva, Plaghera, Sobretta)
- Valtorta

=== Trentino ===
- Baselga di Pinè
- Bondone
- Brentonico (Pölsa, San Valentino)
- Brocon
- Catinaccio
- Folgaria
- Folgarida
- Lavarone
- Madonna di Campiglio (Cima Grostè)
- Molveno
- Paganella
- Panarotta (Levico Terme, Pergine Valsugana)
- Passo del Tonale
- Passo Pordoi
- Passo Rolle
- Passo San Pellegrino
- Passo Sella
- Peio (Cogolo)
- Pinzolo
- Predazzo
- Presena
- San Martino di Castrozza
- Val di Fiemme (Predazzo - Bellamonte - Alpe Lusia, Cavalese, Passo di Pampeago)
- Val di Fassa (Campitello, Canazei, Mazzin, Moena, Pozza, Soraga, Vigo)

=== South Tyrol ===
- Alpe di Siusi
- Alta Badia
- Alta Pusteria
- Bressanone
- Brunico
- Sand in Taufers (Speikboden)
- Carezza - Passo di Costalunga
- Colle Isarco - Ladurns
- Corno del Renon
- Curon Venosta (Belpiano, Resia, San Valentino alla Muta - Malga San Valentino, Vallelunga)
- Dobbiaco
- Malles Venosta (Watles)
- Merano 2000
- Monte San Vigilio
- Nova Levante
- Nova Ponente - Obereggen
- Plan
- Plan de Corones
- Racines - Giovo
- San Martino in Passiria
- San Vigilio di Marebbe
- Senales
- Stelvio (Solda)
- Ultimo (Malga Guazza)
- Val Gardena (Ortisei, Santa Cristina Gardena, Selva di Val Gardena)
- Valdaora
- Valle Aurina (Cadipietra - Klausberg)
- Valle Isarco (Plose)
- Vipiteno

=== Veneto ===
- Alleghe
- Alpago (Chies d'Alpago, Farra d'Alpago, Pieve d'Alpago, Puos d'Alpago, Tambre)
- Auronzo di Cadore
- Bosco Chiesanuova (Malga San Giorgio)
- Civetta
- Comelico Superiore
- Cortina d'Ampezzo
- Falcade
- Livinallongo del Col di Lana (Arabba, Plan Boè)
- Malcesine - Monte Baldo
- Marmolada
- Monte Avena
- Monte Grappa
- Nevegal
- Passo delle Fittanze della Sega
- Passo Fedaia
- Passo San Pellegrino
- Pian del Cansiglio
- Recoaro Mille
- Sappada
- Selva di Cadore
- Tonezza del Cimone (Altopiano dei Fiorentini)
- Zoldo Alto (Palafavera)

=== Friuli-Venezia Giulia ===
- Forni di Sopra - Sauris
- Passo Pramollo
- Piancavallo
- Sella Nevea - Canin
- Tarvisio
- Zoncolan (Ravascletto)

=== Emilia-Romagna ===
- Cerreto Laghi
- Cimone (Sestola, Pievepelago)
- Corno alle Scale

=== Tuscany ===
- Abetone
- Amiata
- Cutigliano-Doganaccia
- Zum Zeri

=== Marche ===
- Frontone - Monte Catria
- Sassotetto
- Ussita (Frontignano)

=== Lazio ===
- Campo Catino
- Campo Staffi
- Monte Livata
- Terminillo

=== Abruzzo ===
- Campo di Giove
- Campo Felice
- Campo Imperatore
- Cappadocia
- Ovindoli
- Passo Lanciano-La Majelletta ski area
- Pescasseroli
- Pescocostanzo
- Prati di Tivo
- Rivisondoli
- Roccaraso
- Scanno (Monte Rotondo, Passo Godi)
- Tagliacozzo
- San Giacomo (Valle Castellana)
- Prato Selva
- Campo Rotondo
- Passo San Leonardo
- Passo Godi
- Pizzoferrato
- Gamberale
- Tre Nevi
- Alto Sangro

=== Molise ===
- Campitello Matese

=== Campania ===
- Laceno

=== Basilicata ===
- Arioso
- Sellata

=== Calabria ===
- Camigliatello Silano
- Gambarie

=== Sicily ===
- Etna (Piano Provenzana, Rifugio Sapienza)
- Piano Battaglia

=== Sardinia ===
- Bruncu Spina ski area

== Kosovo ==
- Brezovica ski resort
- Rugova

== Latvia ==
- Baiļi
- Gaiziņš (Golgāts)
- Jēkaba grava
- Kaķīškalns
- Ķauķu kalns
- Lemberga hūte
- Mežezers
- Mežkalni
- Milzkalns
- Ozolkalns
- Rāmkalni
- Reiņa trase
- Riekstukalns
- Sauleskalns
- Siguldas trase
- Žagarkalns
- Zviedru cepure

== Liechtenstein ==
- Malbun

== Lithuania ==
- Anykščiai
- Druskininkai
- Ignalina
- Liepkalnis Winter Sports Centre

== Montenegro ==
- Durmitor
- Kolašin
- Vucje

== North Macedonia ==
- Kožuf
- Kruševo
- Mavrovo
- Nižepole
- Pelister
- Ponikva
- Popova Šapka

== Norway ==
- Bjorli
- Filefjell
- Geilo
- Hafjell (near Lillehammer)
- Hemsedal
- Holmenkollen
- Hovden
- Kongsberg
- Kvitfjell
- Målselv - nordic
- Meråker
- Narvik - alpine
- Norefjell
- Myrkdalen
- Oppdal
- Rauland
- Sauda - alpine/nordic
- Sirdal
- Sjusjøen - nordic
- Stryn Sommerski (all summer)
- Tromsø - alpine nordic
- Trondheim - alpine (Vassfjellet)
- Trondheim - nordic (Bymarka).
- Trysil
- Tryvann
- Voss

== Poland ==
- Białka Tatrzańska
- Bukowina Tatrzańska
- Karpacz
- Krynica Zdrój
- Rabka-Zdrój
- Czarna Gora
- Szczyrk
- Szklarska Poręba
- Ustroń
- Wisła
- Zakopane
- Zawoja

== Portugal ==
- Vodafone Ski Resort, in Serra da Estrela (near Loriga)

== Romania ==
=== Banat ===
- Muntele Mic
- Semenic

=== Bucovina ===
- Campulung Moldovenesc
- Carlibaba
- Gura Humorului
- Pojorata
- Vatra Dornei

=== Crişana ===
- Moneasa
- Stâna de Vale

=== Maramureş ===
- Băile Borşa
- Cavnic
- Firiza
- Izvoare
- Mogoşa
- Ocna Şugatag

=== Moldavia ===
- Durău
- Piatra Neamț
- Slănic-Moldova
- Soveja

=== Muntenia ===
- Azuga
- Băile Siriu
- Buşteni
- Cheia
- Dâmbovicoara
- Ialomicioara
- Rucăr
- Sinaia

=== Oltenia ===
- Băile Olăneşti
- Băile Govora
- Călimăneşti
- Cheile Olteţului
- Ocnele Mari
- Ponoarele
- Rânca
- Vidra
- Voineasa

=== Transylvania ===
- Albac
- Arieșeni
- Băișoara
- Bâlea
- Bran
- Geoagiu (Geoagiu Băi)
- Harghita Băi
- Izvorul Mureşului
- Păltiniș
- Parâng
- Pârâul Rece
- Poiana Brașov
- Predeal
- Sângeorz-Băi
- Sovata
- Straja
- Șugaș Băi
- Tihuta / Piatra Fântânele

== Russia ==
=== Caucasus Mountains ===
- Cheget
- Dombay
- Elbrus
- Krasnaya Polyana
- Rosa Khutor Alpine Resort
- Tsey

=== Leningrad Oblast ===
- Igora
- Kavgolovo-Toksovo
- Snezhny
- Okhta Park
- Pukhtolova Gora
- Yukki Park
- Zolotaya Dolina

=== Moscow Oblast ===
- Sorochany

=== Murmansk Oblast ===
- Kirovsk

=== Tver Oblast ===
- Panovo

=== Ural Mountains ===
Bashkortostan -

- Park Pobedy, Ufa, Republic of Bashkortostan
- Ak-Yort, Ufa, Republic of Bashkortostan
- Olympic Park, Ufa, Republic of Bashkortostan
- Abzakovo
- Bannoye Lake

Chelyabinsk Oblast -

- Adzhigardak
- Minyar
- Zavyalikha

Perm Krai -

- Gubakha

Sverdlovsk Oblast -

- Pilnaya

== Serbia ==
=== Balkan Mountains ===
- Crni Vrh ski center
- Stara Planina ski center
- Suva Planina ski center

=== Dinaric Alps ===
- Brezovica ski center
- Divčibare ski center
- Goč ski center
- Golija ski center
- Kopaonik ski resort
- Iver ski center
- Tara ski center
- Tornik ski center
- Zlatar ski center

=== Rilo-Rhodope Mountains ===
- Besna Kobila ski center

== Slovakia ==
=== Tatra Mountains ===
- Parksnow Štrbské Pleso
- Starý Smokovec
- Tatranská Lomnica
- Ždiar
- Roháče - Spálená

=== Low Tatras ===
- Čachovo - Selce
- Jasná
- Liptovský Ján - Javorovica
- Lopušná dolina
- Mýto pod Ďumbierom
- Opalisko - Závažná Poruba
- Park Snow Donovaly
- Polomka - Bučník
- Ski Centrum Čertovica
- Ski centrum Zapač
- Snowpark Lučivná
- Vyšná Boca - Bačova roveň

=== Other mountain ranges ===
- Drienica - Lysá
- Pezinská Baba
- Plejsy
- Veľká Rača
- Vrátna Free Time Zone
- Bachledka Ski&Sun
- Oravská Lesná
- Malinô Brdo
- Kubínska hoľa
- Králiky
- Skalka pri Kremnici

== Slovenia ==
- TC Gače
- Cerkno
- Golte
- Ivarčko-Ošven
- Javornik
- Kanin-Sella Nevea
- Kobla
- Kope-Ribniško Pohorje
- Kranjska Gora
- Krvavec
- Mariborsko Pohorje
- Rogla
- Soriška Planina
- Stari Vrh
- Trije Kralji
- Velika Planina
- Vogel

== Spain ==
=== Pyrenees ===
From East to West:

- Vallter 2000
- Vall de Núria
- Aransa (cross-country)
- Guils Fontanera (cross-country)
- Alp 2500 (combines La Molina and Masella)
- Lles (only cross-country skiing)
- Sant Joan de l´Erm (cross-country)
- Port del Comte
- Port Ainé
- Tavascan
- Tuixent - la Vansa (cross-country)
- Virós - Vall Ferrera
- Espot Esquí
- Baqueira-Beret
- Boí Taüll
- Llanos del Hospital (only cross-country skiing)
- Linza (cross-country)
- Lizarra (cross-country)
- Aramon Cerler
- Aramon Panticosa
- Aramon Formigal
- Astún
- Oza-Gabardito (cross-country)
- Pineta
- Candanchú
- Larra-Belagua (only cross-country skiing)
- Irati-Abodi (cross-country)

=== Cantabrian Mountains ===
From East to West:

- Lunada
- Alto Campoo
- San Isidro
- Fuentes de Invierno
- Valgrande-Pajares
- Leitariegos
- Manzaneda

=== Sistema Central ===
- Sierra de Béjar - La Covatilla
- Navacerrada
- Navafria (only cross-country skiing)
- La Pinilla
- Puerto de Cotos (cross-country)
- Valdesquí

=== Sistema Ibérico ===
- Aramon Javalambre
- La Muela de San Juan (cross-country)
- Aramon Valdelinares
- Valdezcaray

=== Baetic System ===
- Sierra Nevada, the southernmost ski resort in Europe
- Puerto de La Ragua (only cross-country skiing)

== Sweden ==
- Abisko
- Åre - Åre Ski Area
- Bjursås
- Björkliden
- Borgafjäll
- Branäs
- Bydalen
- Dundret
- Duved
- Edsåsdalen
- Fjätervålen
- Flottsbro in Stockholm
- Funäsdalen
- Hassela
- Hemavan
- Hovfjället
- Hundfjället
- Högfjället
- Idre
- Isaberg in Hestra
- Kittelfjäll
- Kläppen
- Kungsberget near Sandviken
- Lindvallen
- Lofsdalen
- Nalovardo
- Näsfjället
- Riksgränsen
- Romme near Borlänge
- Sollefteå
- Storlien
- Storstenshöjden
- Stöten
- Sälen
- Tandådalen
- Tärnaby
- Vallåsen
- Vemdalen

== Switzerland ==
=== Central Switzerland ===
- Andermatt
- Engelberg / Titlis
- Melchsee-Frutt
- Sörenberg
- Stoos

=== Eastern Switzerland ===
- Braunwald
- Elm
- Flumserberg
- Pizol / Bad Ragaz
- Wildhaus

=== Bern ===
- Adelboden
- Axalp
- Beatenberg
- Grindelwald
- Gstaad
- Kandersteg
- Lenk
- Meiringen
- Mürren
- Prés-d'Orvin
- Tramelan
- Wengen
- Zweisimmen

=== Fribourg ===
- La Berra
- Charmey
- Jaun
- Moléson
- Mont-Gibloux
- Les Paccots
- Rathvel
- Schwarzsee

=== Graubünden ===
- Arosa
- Bergün
- Brigels
- Davos
- Disentis
- Flims
- Klosters
- Laax
- Lenzerheide
- Obersaxen
- St. Moritz
- Samnaun
- San Bernardino
- Savognin
- Scuol
- Sedrun
- Sils
- Vals

=== Canton of Jura ===
- Les Breuleux
- Les Genevez

=== Neuchâtel ===
- Bugnenets-Savagnières
- Crêt-du-Puy

=== Ticino ===
- Airolo
- Bosco/Gurin
- Carì

=== Valais ===
- Anzère
- Arolla
- Belalp
- Bettmeralp
- Blatten bei Naters
- Bruson
- Champéry
- Champex
- Chandolin
- Crans-Montana
- Evolène
- Fiesch
- La Fouly
- Grächen
- Grimentz
- Leukerbad
- Liddes-Vichères
- Lötschental
- Morgins
- Nendaz
- Ovronnaz
- Riederalp
- Saas Fee
- Saas Grund
- Saint-Luc
- Les Marécottes
- Super Saint-Bernard
- La Tzoumaz
- Verbier
- Vercorin
- Visperterminen
- Zermatt / Klein Matterhorn
- Zinal

=== Vaud ===
- Château-d'Oex
- Les Diablerets
- La Dôle
- Gryon
- La Lécherette
- Leysin
- Les Mosses
- Les Pléïades
- Les Rochers de Naye
- Saint-Cergue
- Sainte-Croix
- Vallée de Joux
- Villars-sur-Ollon

== Ukraine ==
- Bukovel
- Drahobrat
- Oriavchyk
- Podobovets and Pilipets
- Slavske
- Tisovets
- VyshHora

== United Kingdom ==
Northern England

- Harwood Common - Alston
- Yad Moss - Alston
- Raise
- Swinhope in Weardale

Highlands of Scotland

- Cairngorm (Aviemore)
- Glencoe Ski Centre
- Glenshee Ski Centre
- The Lecht
- Nevis Range

Lowlands of Scotland

- Lowther Hills
- Pentland Hills
