= Abzakovo =

Abzakovo (Russian: Абзаково) is the name of several rural localities in the Republic of Bashkortostan, Russia:

- Abzakovo, Baymaksky District, Republic of Bashkortostan, a village in Baymaksky District
- Abzakovo, Beloretsky District, Republic of Bashkortostan, a selo in Beloretsky District, and the ski resort of the same name located there
- Abzakovo, Uchalinsky District, Republic of Bashkortostan, a village in Uchalinsky District
