= Roza Akkuchukova =

Russian singer (1950–2021)

- Born: 12 February 1950; Abzakovo, Beloretsky District, Bashkir ASSR, Soviet Union
- Died: 8 February 2021 (aged 70); Ufa, Bashkortostan, Russia
- Occupation: Singer

Roza Sabiryanovna Akkuchukova (Russian: Роза Сабирьяновна Аккучукова, Bashkir: Роза Сабирйән ҡыҙы Аҡкучукова; 12 February 1950 – 8 February 2021) was a Russian and Bashkir pop singer. She started singing in 1973 and became the Director of the Bashkir State Philharmonic Society in 1997. In 2009, she was honored as a People's Artist of the Republic of Bashkortostan.

== Biography ==
Akkuchukova was born in Abzakovo in the Bashkir Autonomous Soviet Socialist Republic. Her parents were highly respected in the Bashkir community, as many of her siblings obtained leadership positions in the government. She moved to Ufa and attended a musical school, graduating in 1972 and becoming a professional singer. That year, she joined the Bashkir State Philharmonic Society and started touring in many cities and towns across the Soviet Union. In 1997, she became Director of the Bashkir State Philharmonic Society, a position she maintained until her death. She also was a People's Artist of the Republic of Bashkortostan, honored in 2009.

Roza Akkuchukova died from COVID-19 in Ufa on 8 February 2021, at the age of 70, during the COVID-19 pandemic in Russia.
