= Montaimont =

Montaimont Montémon (Savoyard)
- Part of Saint-François-Longchamp
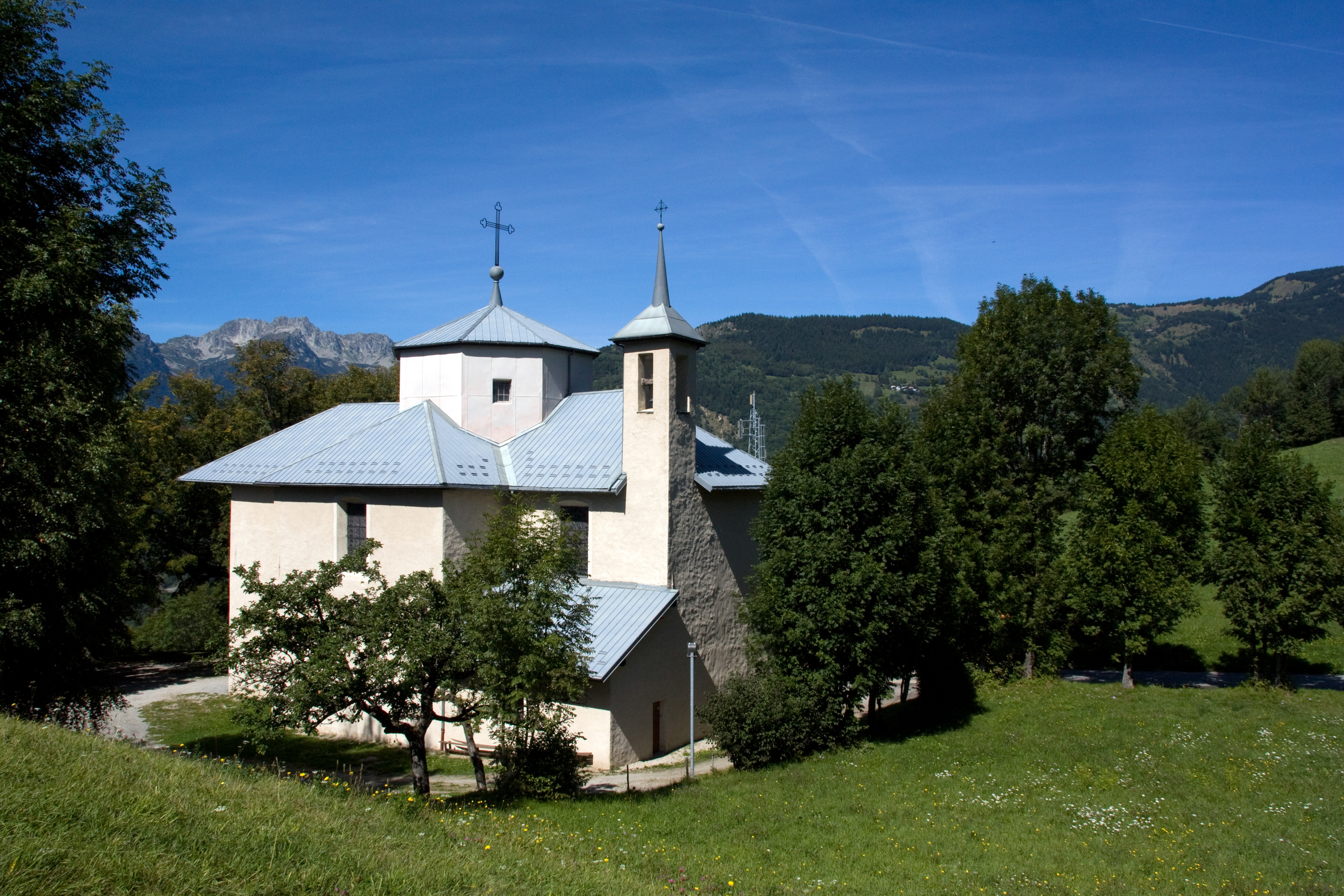
- The Chapel of Our Lady of Beaurevers, in Montaimont
- Location of Montaimont
- Location within France Location within Auvergne-Rhône-Alpes
- Coordinates: 45°22′20″N 6°20′51″E
- Country: France
- Region: Auvergne-Rhône-Alpes
- Department: Savoie
- Arrondissement: Saint-Jean-de-Maurienne
- Canton: Saint-Jean-de-Maurienne
- Commune: Saint-François-Longchamp
- Area^{1}: 28.35 km^{2} (10.95 sq mi)
- Highest elevation: 2,815 m (9,236 ft)
- Lowest elevation: 676 m (2,218 ft)
- Population (2022): 212
  - Density: 7.48/km^{2} (19.4/sq mi)
- Time zone: UTC+01:00 (CET)
  - Summer (DST): UTC+02:00 (CEST)
- Postal code: 73130
- Website: www.montaimont.com
- ^{1} French Land Register data, which excludes lakes, ponds, glaciers > 1 km^{2} (0.386 sq mi or 247 acres) and river estuaries.

Montaimont (French pronunciation: [mɔ̃tɛmɔ̃]; Savoyard: Montémon) is a former commune in the Savoie department in the Auvergne-Rhône-Alpes region in south-eastern France. On 1 January 2017, it was merged into the commune Saint-François-Longchamp.

== See also ==
- Communes of the Savoie department
