= Tavascan =

Coordinates: 42°38′36.41″N 1°15′22.25″E

Tavascan Spanish: Tavascán, Catalan: Tavascan
- Village
- Interactive map of Tavascan
- Country: Spain
- Autonomous community: Catalonia
- Province: Lleida
- Comarca: Pallars Sobirà

Area
  - Total: 0.066 km^{2} (0.025 sq mi)
- Elevation: 1,122 m (3,681 ft)

Population (2011)
  - Total: 114
- Postal code: 25577
- Website: http://www.tavascan.net/ (Spanish and Catalan only)

Catalonia shown in red within Spain

Tavascan (Spanish: Tavascán, Catalan: Tavascan) is a village located in the province of Lleida in Catalonia, Spain. The village lies in a valley approximately 8 kilometres from the French border and 16 kilometres from the Andorran border. Tavascan is situated on a slope 1122 metres above sea level. In the village there are three hotels and one restaurant that serve tourists drawn to the area by the surrounding valleys and ski slopes of Tavascan Pleta del Prat.

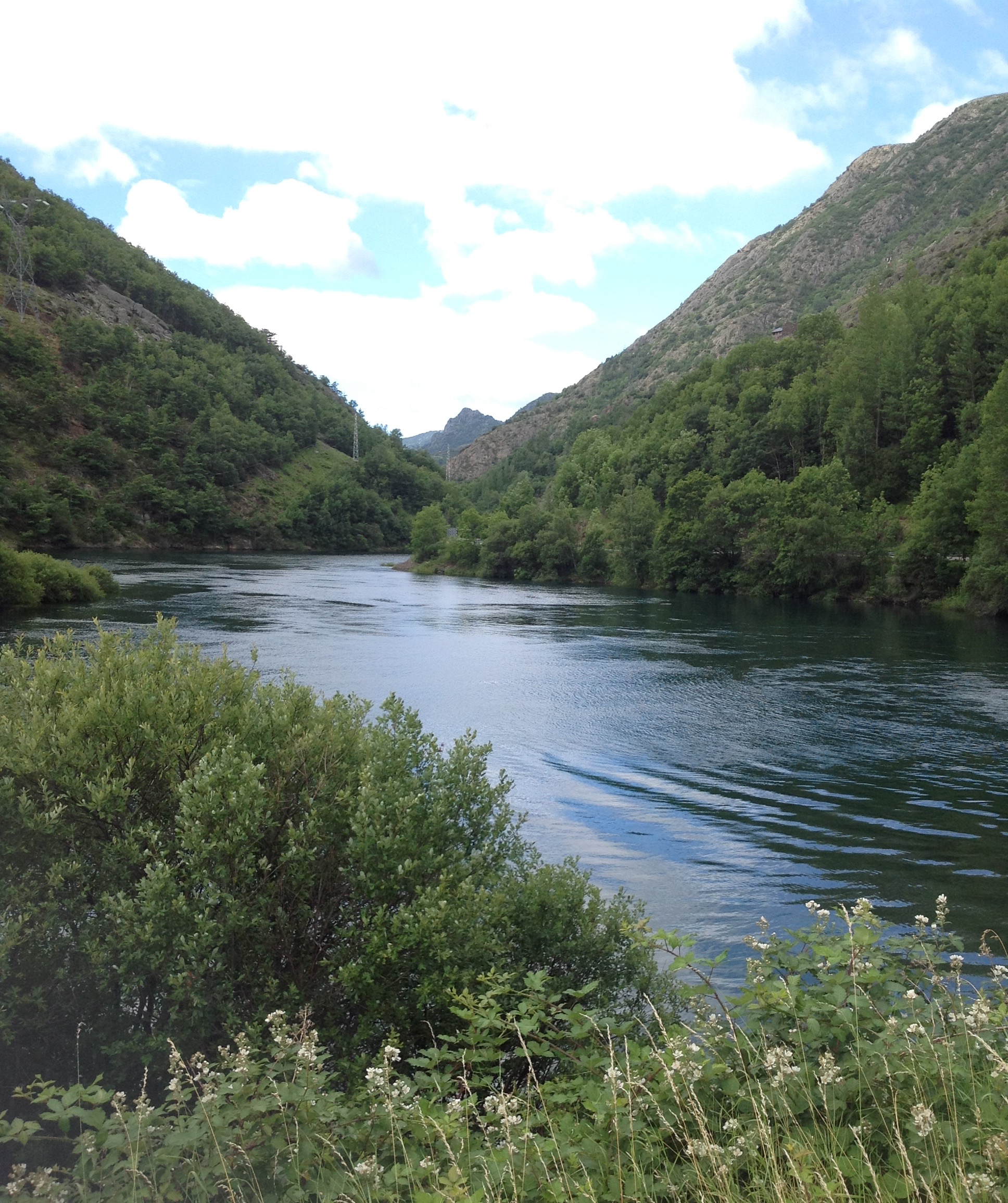
Pantà de Tavascan, Catalan for 'Marsh of Tavascan' (photo taken in July 2014)

The small river of Tavascan (Spanish: Río de Tavascán, Catalan: Riu de Tavascan) runs through the centre of the village, and flows into the Pantà de Tavascan, which flows into the river of Lladorre.

Attractions in Tavascan include the village church of Saint Bartholomew.

Tavascan is the location of the end of the main L-504 road, which continues as small forest tracks.
