= Montgellafrey =

Montgellafrey Monzlafrèt (Savoyard)
- Part of Saint-François-Longchamp
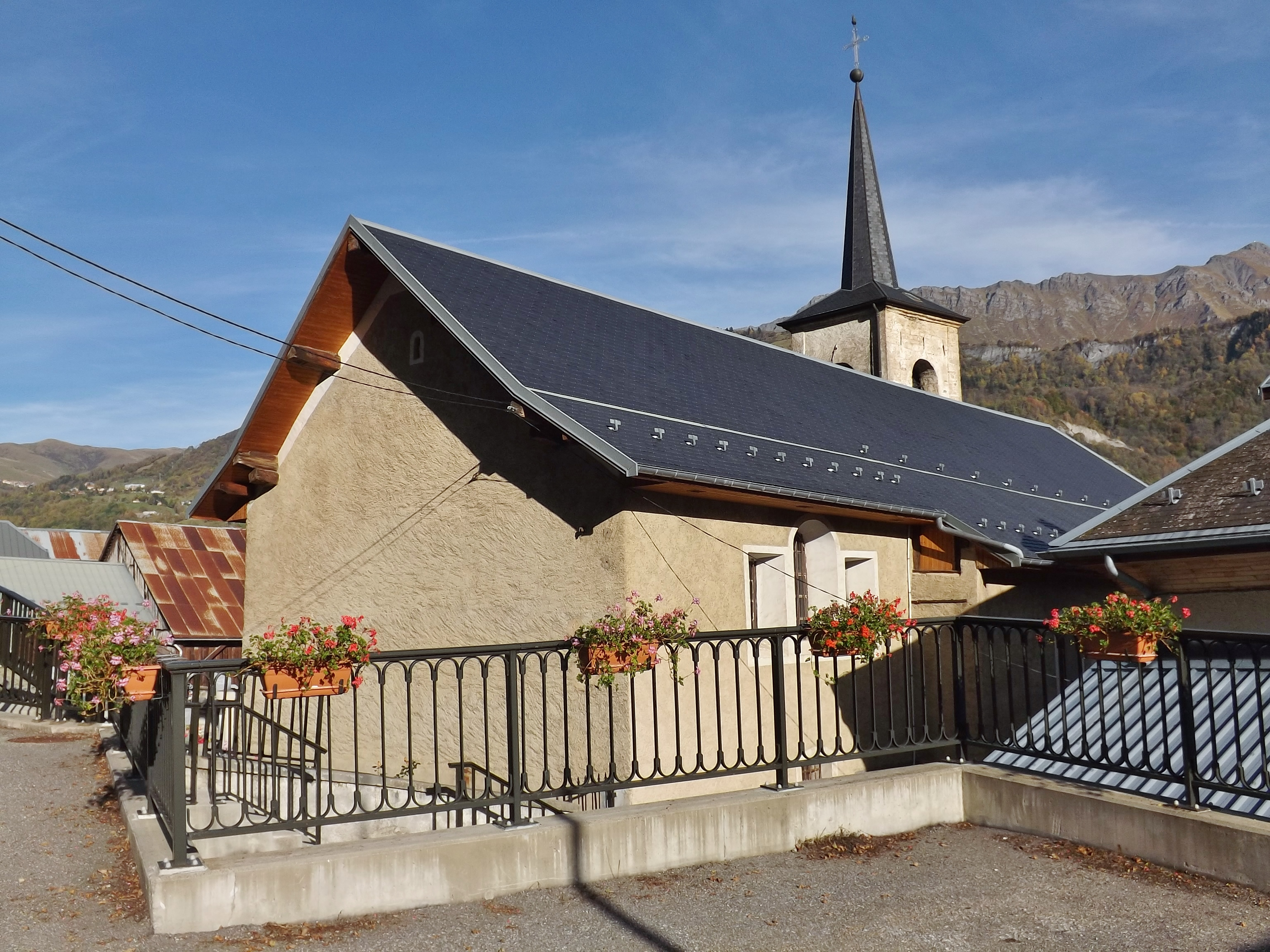
- The church of Saint-Théodule, in Montgellafrey
- Location of Montgellafrey
- Location within France Location within Auvergne-Rhône-Alpes
- Coordinates: 45°23′34″N 6°19′10″E
- Country: France
- Region: Auvergne-Rhône-Alpes
- Department: Savoie
- Arrondissement: Saint-Jean-de-Maurienne
- Canton: Saint-Jean-de-Maurienne
- Commune: Saint-François-Longchamp
- Area^{1}: 19.36 km^{2} (7.47 sq mi)
- Highest elevation: 2,610 m (8,560 ft)
- Lowest elevation: 821 m (2,694 ft)
- Population (2022): 87
  - Density: 4.5/km^{2} (12/sq mi)
- Time zone: UTC+01:00 (CET)
  - Summer (DST): UTC+02:00 (CEST)
- Postal code: 73130
- Website: www.montgellafrey.fr
- ^{1} French Land Register data, which excludes lakes, ponds, glaciers > 1 km^{2} (0.386 sq mi or 247 acres) and river estuaries.

Montgellafrey (French pronunciation: [mɔ̃ʒɛlafʁɛ]; Savoyard: Monzlafrèt) is a former commune in the Savoie department in the Auvergne-Rhône-Alpes region in south-eastern France. On 1 January 2017, it was merged into the commune Saint-François-Longchamp.

== See also ==
- Communes of the Savoie department
