= Alto Sangro =

Ski resort in Abruzzo, Italy

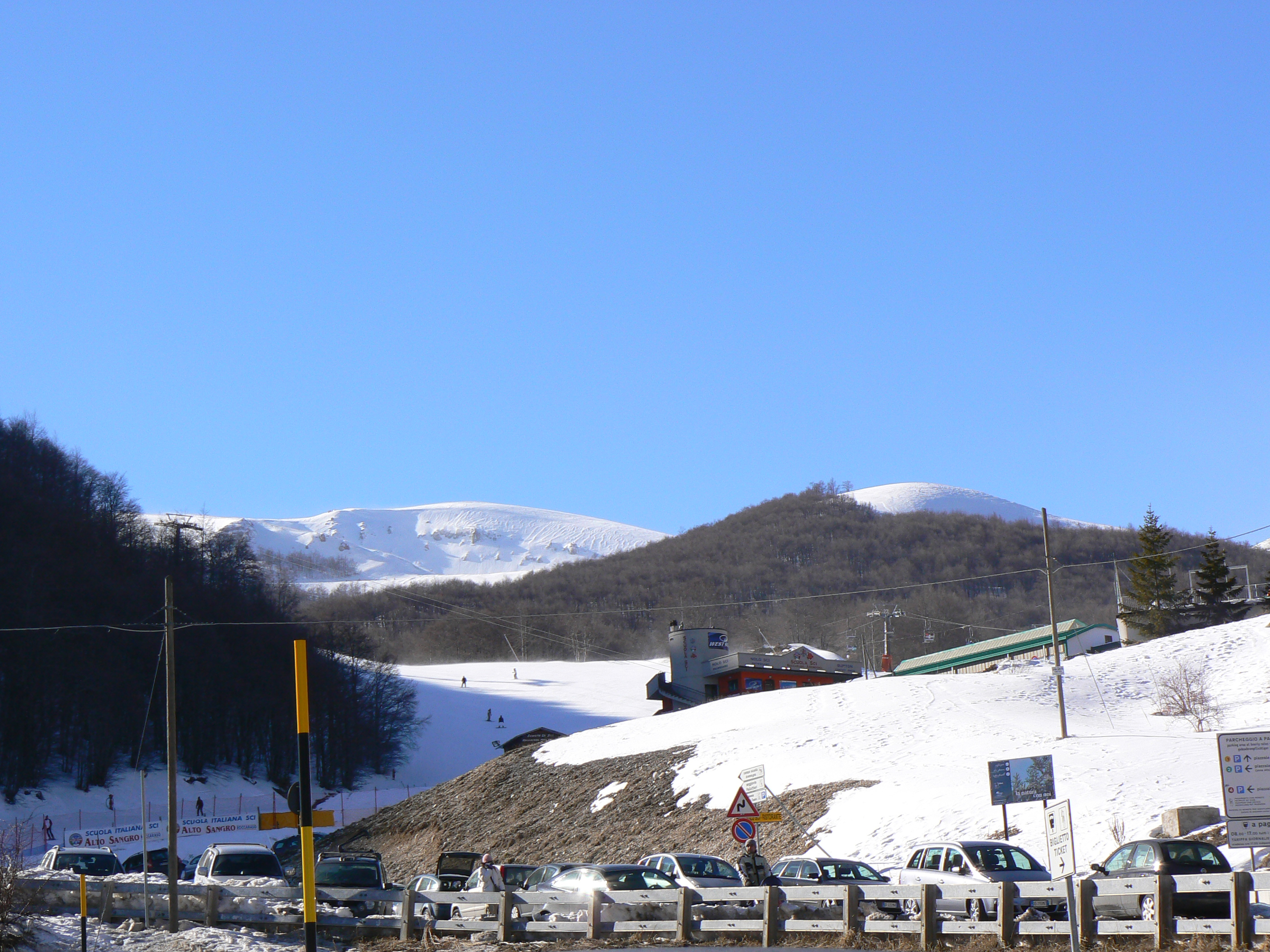
- Interactive map of Alto Sangro
- Location: Abruzzo, Italy
- Nearest major city: (Barrea, Pescasseroli, Pescocostanzo, Rivisondoli, Roccaraso)
- Coordinates: 41°49′49″N 14°01′23″E
- Top elevation: 2141 m
- Base elevation: 1309 m
- Skiable area: 90 km of runs
- Trails: 90,5km total; 37km (41%) easy; 32,6km (36%) intermediate; 20,9km (23%) difficult
- Lift system: 24 lifts
- Website: www.roccaraso.net/home

The Alto Sangro ski area is the largest ski area of Central Italy-Southern Italy, located in the lower Abruzzo, in province of L'Aquila, and made up of five localities in the province of L'Aquila (Barrea, Pescasseroli, Pescocostanzo, Rivisondoli and Roccaraso); a small part of the territory is included in the Abruzzo, Lazio and Molise National Park, the remainder falls within the external protection zone and a small part in the south-western part of the Maiella National Park; the best known slopes are those of Rivisondoli-Roccaraso: Aremogna, Monte Pratello and Pizzalto.

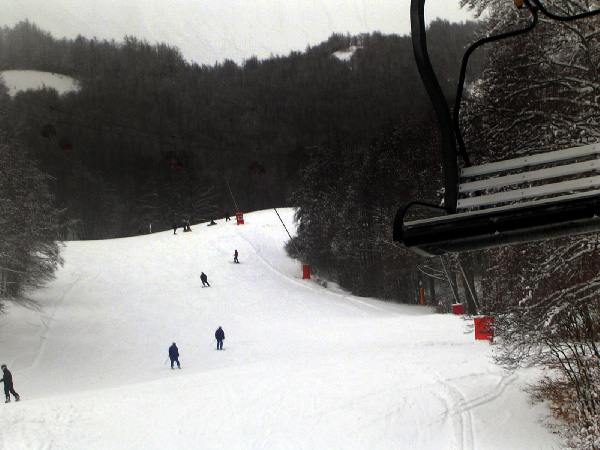
red track

In 2010 the area celebrated its 100th anniversary; in fact, the first international race held in these mountains dates back to 1910, precisely in Roccaraso. International level competitions are held annually in the Alto Sangro: in 2005 the men's and women's finals of the European Alpine Ski Cup 2005 were held and in 2012 the area hosted the Italian Alpine Ski Championships 2012 and the 2012 Alpine Skiing World Junior Championships. In 2017, the area was equipped with a powerful artificial snow system (the largest in Italy and the third in the world) and new gondola lifts.

The area consists of 5 ski areas:

1. Barrea
2. Pescasseroli
3. Pescocostanzo
4. Rivisondoli
5. Roccaraso
