= Orange (ski resort) =

Village and ski resort in France

- Location within France Location within Auvergne-Rhône-Alpes Location within Alps
- Location: Saint-Sixt, Auvergne-Rhône-Alpes, France
- Nearest city: La Roche-sur-Foron
- Coordinates: 46°01′39″N 6°19′31″E
- Top elevation: 1,170 m (3,840 ft)
- Base elevation: 1,100 m (3,600 ft)
- Lift system: 3 lifts
- Website: www.station-orange.com

Orange (also Orange-Montisel) is a French village and ski resort located in the commune of Saint-Sixt, in the department of Haute-Savoie and the region of Auvergne-Rhône-Alpes in France. It lies above the commune of La Roche-sur-Foron.

== Geography ==
Orange is located near La Roche-sur-Foron, in the department of Haute-Savoie, at an altitude of between 1,100 and 1,170 m (3,610 and 3,840 ft). Despite its relatively low altitude, Orange receives a generous amount of snowfall during the winter, partly thanks to its location in the heart of the Plateau des Bornes, which experiences a snowy microclimate.

== Activities ==
=== Winter sports ===
Orange is especially known as a site for cross-country skiing. It contains trails categorized as piste verte (easy), piste bleue (moderately difficult) and piste rouge (difficult).
