= Saint-François-Longchamp =

- Commune
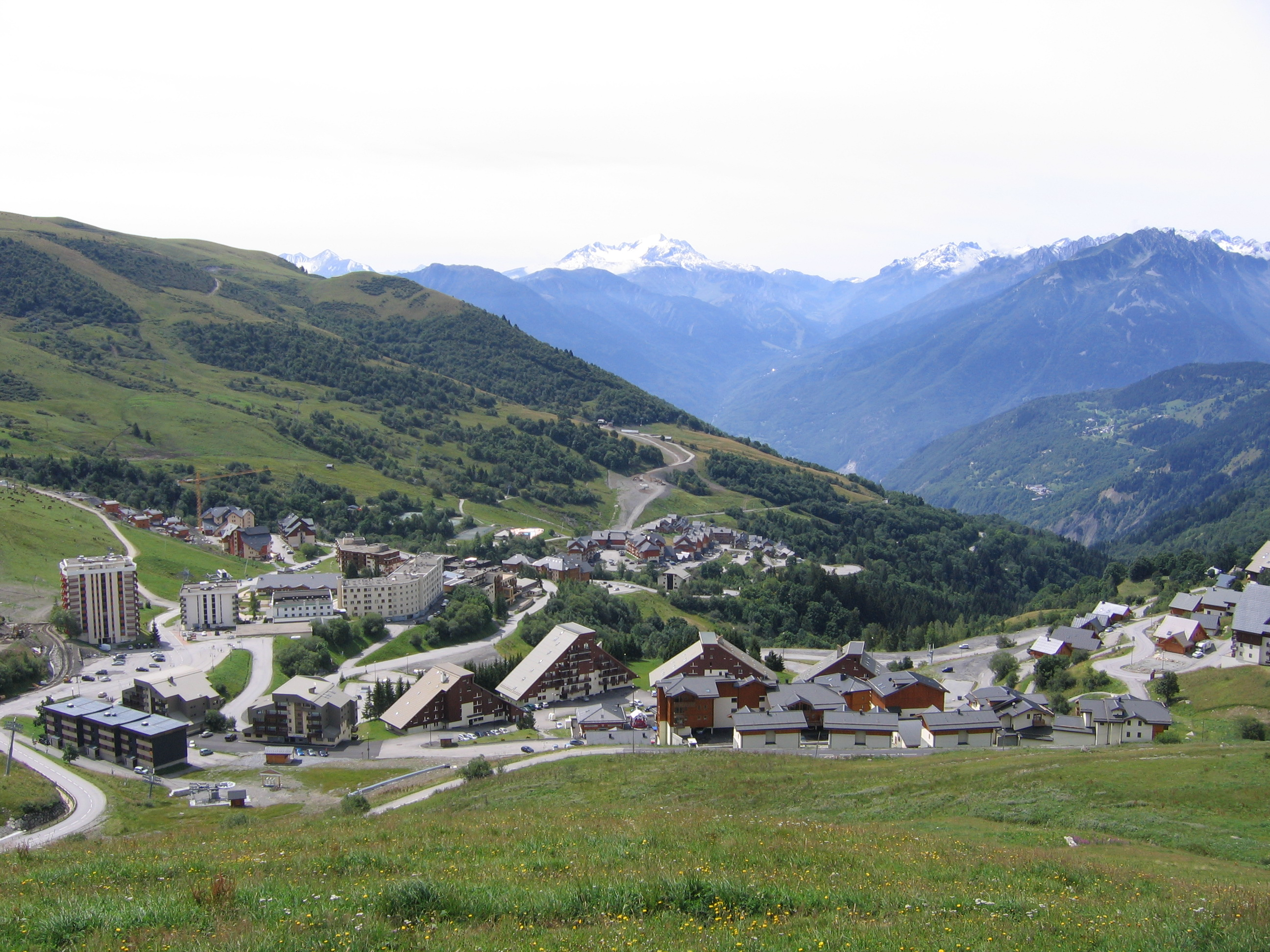
- A general view of Saint-François-Longchamp 1650

- Coat of arms
- Location of Saint-François-Longchamp
- Location within France Location within Auvergne-Rhône-Alpes
- Coordinates: 45°24′38″N 6°20′57″E
- Country: France
- Region: Auvergne-Rhône-Alpes
- Department: Savoie
- Arrondissement: Saint-Jean-de-Maurienne
- Canton: Saint-Jean-de-Maurienne

Government
  - Mayor (2020–2026): Patrick Provost
- Area^{1}: 60.68 km^{2} (23.43 sq mi)
- Highest elevation: 2,832 m (9,291 ft)
- Lowest elevation: 676 m (2,218 ft)
- Population (2023): 433
  - Density: 7.14/km^{2} (18.5/sq mi)
- Time zone: UTC+01:00 (CET)
  - Summer (DST): UTC+02:00 (CEST)
- INSEE/Postal code: 73235 /73130
- ^{1} French Land Register data, which excludes lakes, ponds, glaciers > 1 km^{2} (0.386 sq mi or 247 acres) and river estuaries.

Saint-François-Longchamp (French pronunciation: [sɛ̃ fʁɑ̃swa lɔ̃ʃɑ̃]; Arpitan: Sent-Francês-sus-Bujon) is a commune in the Savoie department in the Auvergne-Rhône-Alpes region in south-eastern France. On 1 January 2017, the former communes of Montaimont and Montgellafrey were merged into Saint-François-Longchamp.

== See also ==
- Communes of the Savoie department
