= Abzakovo, Uchalinsky District, Republic of Bashkortostan =

Abzakovo Абзаково Абҙаҡ
- Village
- Location within Bashkortostan Location within Russia
- Coordinates: 54°34′N 59°33′E
- Country: Russia
- Region: Bashkortostan
- District: Uchalinsky District
- Time zone: [[UTC+5:00]]

Abzakovo (Russian: Абзаково, Bashkir: Абҙаҡ, Abźaq) is a rural locality (a village) in Mansurovsky Selsoviet of Uchalinsky District, Bashkortostan, Russia. The population was 500 as of 2010. There are 12 streets.

== Geography ==
Abzakovo is located 38 km north of Uchaly (the district's administrative centre) by road. Absalyamovo is the nearest rural locality.

== Ethnicity ==
The village is inhabited by Bashkirs and others and others.
