= Lunada, Burgos =

Mountain pass in Burgos, Spain

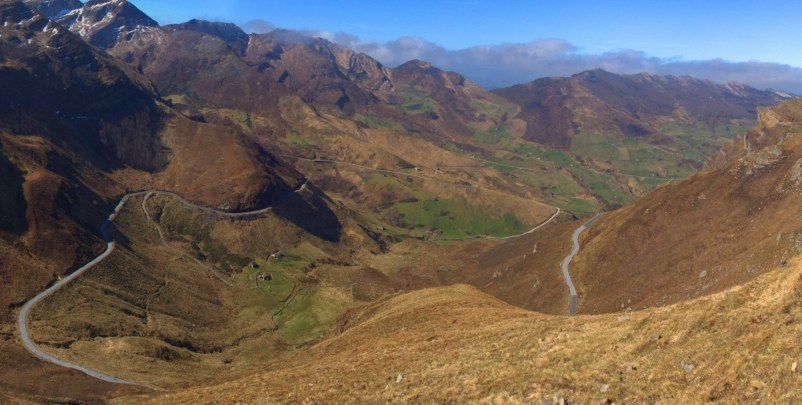
The Portillo de Lunada mountain pass

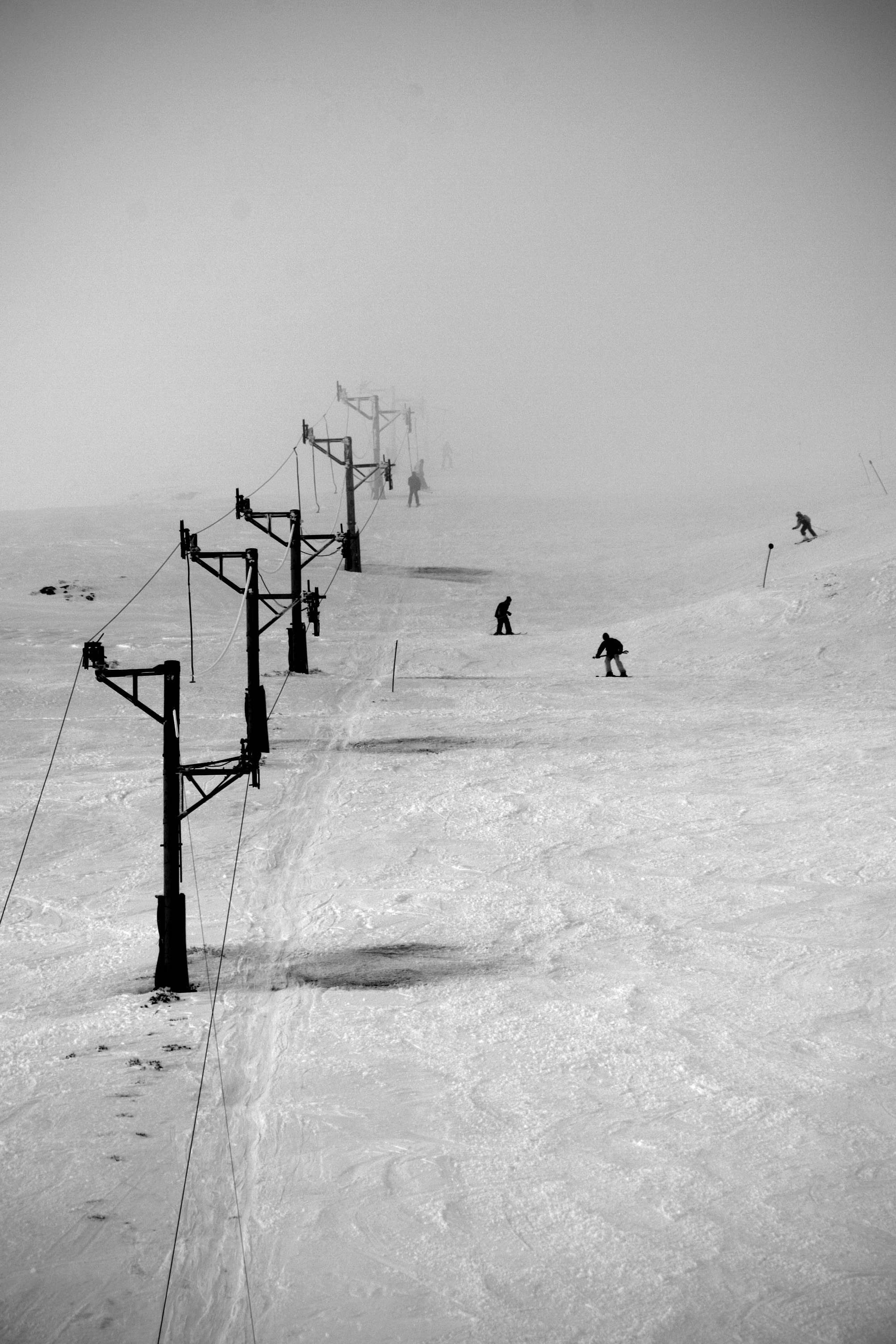
the drag lift at the ski station

Lunada is a mountain pass and ski station in the Cantabrian Mountains, in Burgos, Spain. The pass is the origin of the Miera River, one of the main rivers of Cantabria.
