= La Jarjatte =

Coordinates: 44.675367°N 5.756149°E

Location of La Jarjatte in France

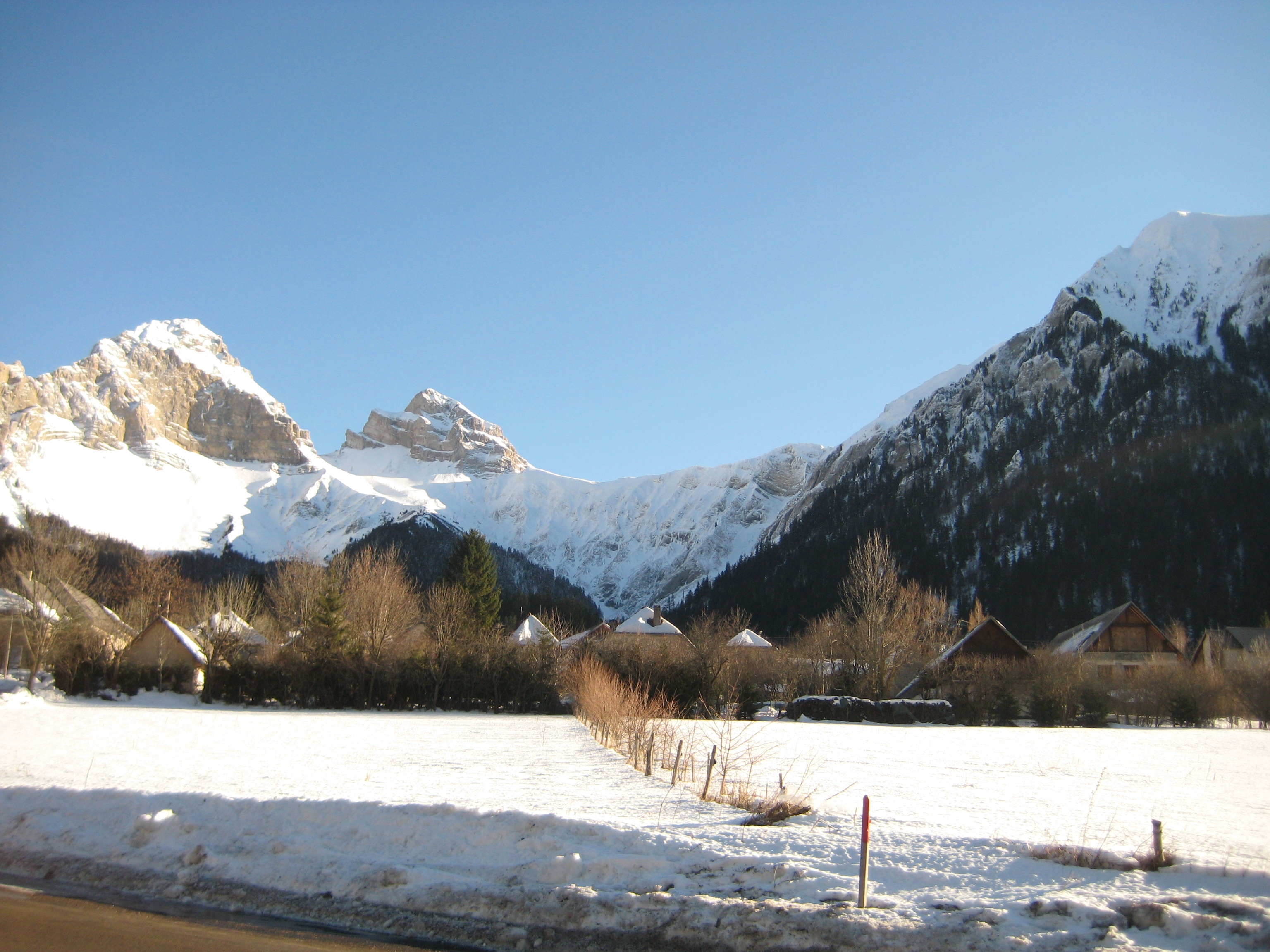

La Jarjatte (French pronunciation: [la ʒaʁʒat]) is a hamlet in the French Dauphiné Alps. Situated at around 1100m, close to the source of the river Buëch, it is part of the commune of Lus-la-Croix-Haute in the Drôme department.

Popular with walkers and hikers in the summer, the village has a via ferrata route, a local ski station and over 18 km of cross-country skiing trails. It is bordered on the east by the Dévoluy massif, and the Vercors to the west. Grenoble is the nearest major city, about 75 km away to the north.

== Summer Activities ==
Being in such a mountainous area, and bordered on all sides by imposing peaks, La Jarjatte attracts many mountain sports enthusiasts. Popular during the French summer holidays, visitors take in the various hiking trails, mountain bike routes, climbing activities and the via ferrata at La Berche.

== Winter Sports ==
La Jarjatte is home to a small ski station, consisting of 5 blue pistes, and a small nursery slope for beginners. It is serviced by 5 drag lifts. There is over 400m of tree-lined vertical descent on gentle, north-facing slopes. The resort usually opens just before Christmas, and the season runs right through until the end of March.

There are over 18 km of prepared cross-country skiing trails in La Jarjatte which can also be enjoyed with snowshoes.

== See also ==
- Communes of the Drôme department
