= Prato Selva =

Coordinates: 42°31′26″N 13°29′26″E

- Frazione
- Interactive map of Prato Selva
- Country: Italy
- Region: Abruzzo
- Province: Teramo
- Time zone: UTC+1 (CET)
  - Summer (DST): UTC+2 (CEST)

Prato Selva is a frazione in the Province of Teramo in the Abruzzo region of Italy. There is a ski resort in Fano Adriano.
