= Kobla Ski Resort =

Ski resort in Slovenia

- Interactive map of Kobla Ski Resort
- Location: Bohinjska Bistrica; Kobla mountain Slovenia
- Nearest city: Bled
- Coordinates: 46.2674°N 13.9587°E
- Vertical: 940 m (3,080 ft)
- Top elevation: 1,480 m (4,860 ft)
- Base elevation: 540 m (1,770 ft)
- Skiable area: 222 acres (0.90 km^{2})
- Longest run: 6 km (3.7 mi)
- Lift system: 6 total 3 surface 3 doublechair
- Snowmaking: yes
- Website: bohinj.si/kobla

Kobla Ski Resort is a Slovenian ski resort located at Bohinjska Bistrica on Kobla mountain in municipality of Bohinj. It has 23 km of ski slopes. The closest city is Bled, half an hour away. The resort used to be serviced by a special ski train platform adjacent to the resort's car park, and close to the lower slopes. The nearest airports are Ljubljana and Trieste. The resort is now owned by a company called 2864 Bohinj, the principal shareholder of which is Leitner. The plan is to build three new circular cable cars: One from Bohinj to Ravne, the second from Ravne to the top of Kobla, and a third which will form an extension of the old ski area to Slatnik. The T bar lift on the lower slope 'Kozji hrbet' is already refurbished, and opened on 11 December 2021.

== Resort statistics ==
Elevation
Summit – 1480 m / 4,854 ft
Base – 540 m / 1,771 ft

Ski terrain
0,9 km^{2} (222 acres) - covering 23 km (14 mi) of ski slopes on one mountain.

Slope Difficulty
/

Vertical drop
- 940 m / (833 ft) in total

Longest run: 6 km

Average winter daytime temperature:

Average annual snowfall:

Lift capacity: 6,000 skiers per hour (all together)

Ski Season Opens: December

Ski Season Ends: March

Snow Conditions Phone Line: +386 0 (4) 5747100

== Ski lifts ==
Name	Length
Kobla I	846 m
Kobla II	947 m
Kobla III	1360 m
Ravne	728m
Kozji hrbet	433 m
Bistrica	367 m
