= Saint-Sixt =

Saint-Sixt San-Fi (Savoyard)
- Commune
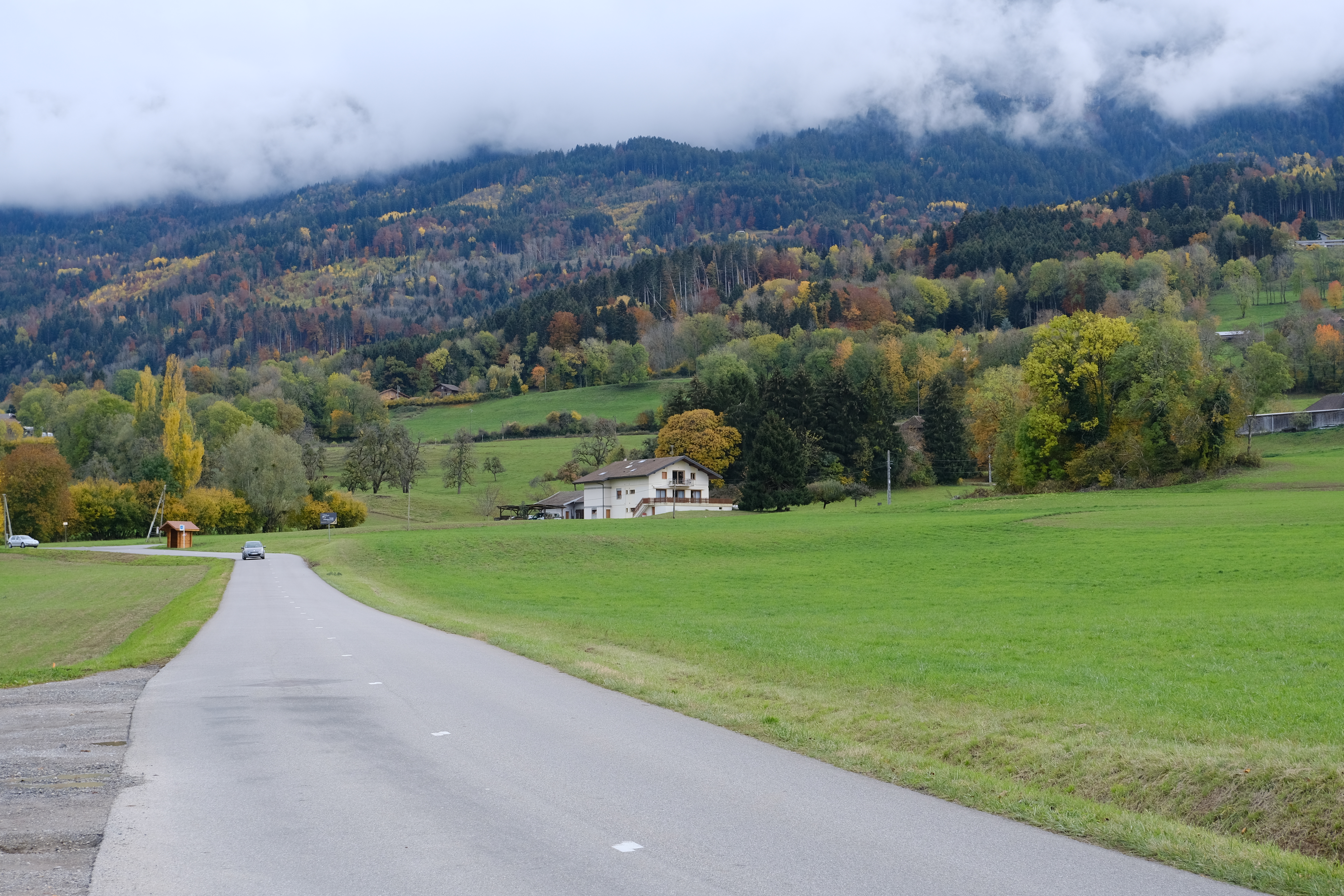

- Coat of arms
- Location of Saint-Sixt
- Location within France Location within Auvergne-Rhône-Alpes
- Coordinates: 46°03′13″N 6°19′48″E
- Country: France
- Region: Auvergne-Rhône-Alpes
- Department: Haute-Savoie
- Arrondissement: Bonneville
- Canton: La Roche-sur-Foron
- Intercommunality: CC du Pays Rochois

Government
  - Mayor (2020–2026): Jean-Claude Harmand
- Area^{1}: 5.21 km^{2} (2.01 sq mi)
- Highest elevation: 1,600 m (5,200 ft)
- Lowest elevation: 550 m (1,800 ft)
- Population (2023): 1,016
  - Density: 195/km^{2} (505/sq mi)
- Time zone: UTC+01:00 (CET)
  - Summer (DST): UTC+02:00 (CEST)
- INSEE/Postal code: 74253 /74800
- ^{1} French Land Register data, which excludes lakes, ponds, glaciers > 1 km^{2} (0.386 sq mi or 247 acres) and river estuaries.

Saint-Sixt (French pronunciation: [sɛ̃ sikst]; Savoyard: San-Fi) is a commune in Haute-Savoie, department of the southeastern Auvergne-Rhône-Alpes region of France. It is just east of La Roche-sur-Foron and north of the Bornes Massif. As of 2023, the population of the commune was 1,016.

== See also ==
- Communes of the Haute-Savoie department
