= Villard-Reculas =

- Commune
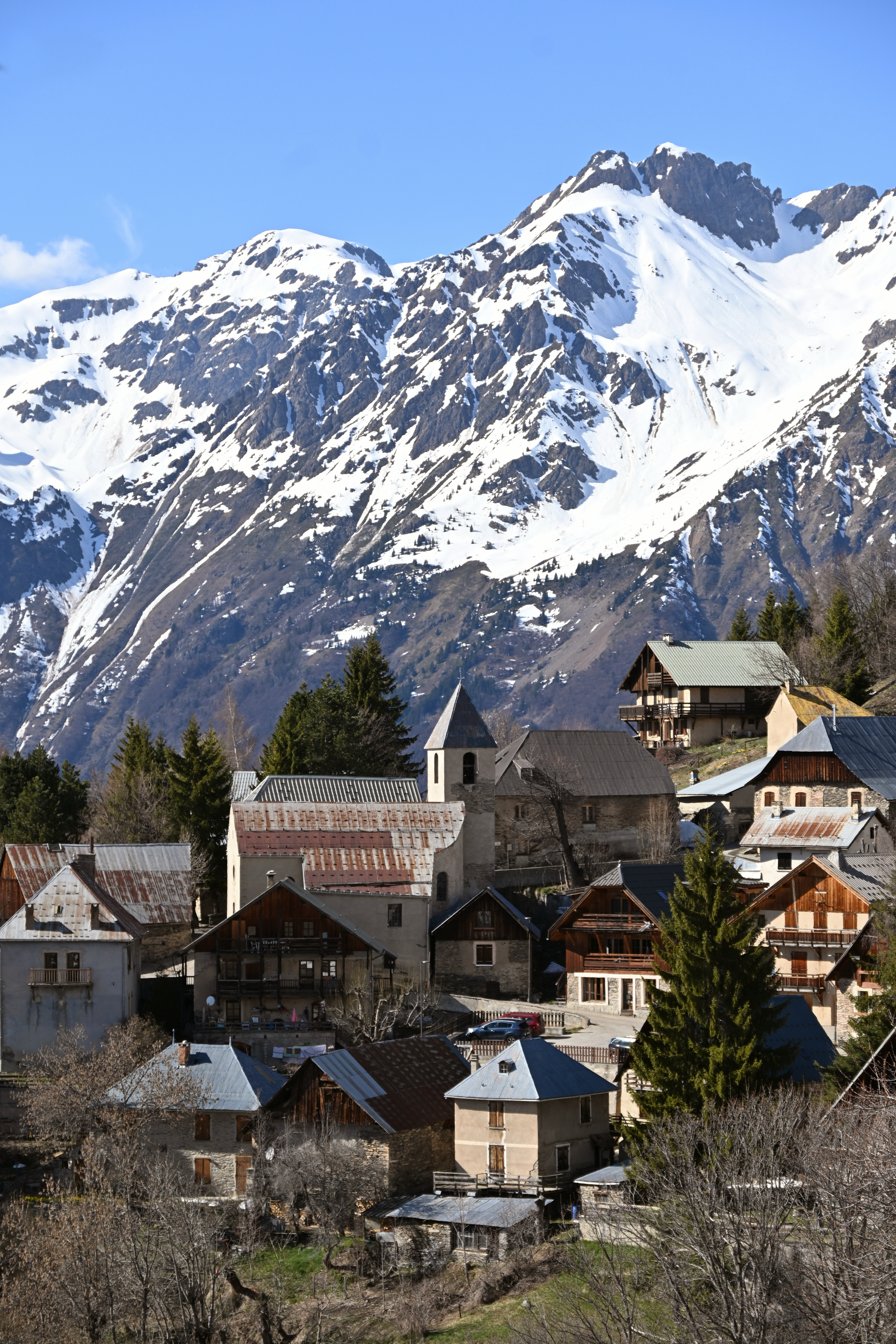
- Villard-Reculas in April 2026
- Location of Villard-Reculas
- Location within France Location within Auvergne-Rhône-Alpes
- Coordinates: 45°05′32″N 6°01′54″E
- Country: France
- Region: Auvergne-Rhône-Alpes
- Department: Isère
- Arrondissement: Grenoble
- Canton: Oisans-Romanche

Government
  - Mayor (2020–2026): Quentin Perrot
- Area^{1}: 5 km^{2} (1.9 sq mi)
- Elevation: 1,445 m (4,741 ft)
- Highest elevation: 2,058 m (6,752 ft)
- Lowest elevation: 826 m (2,710 ft)
- Population (2023): 76
  - Density: 15/km^{2} (39/sq mi)
- Time zone: UTC+01:00 (CET)
  - Summer (DST): UTC+02:00 (CEST)
- INSEE/Postal code: 38550 /38114
- ^{1} French Land Register data, which excludes lakes, ponds, glaciers > 1 km^{2} (0.386 sq mi or 247 acres) and river estuaries.

Villard-Reculas is a commune in the Isère department in southeastern France.

== Population ==
Historical population
Year	Pop.	±% p.a.
1968	23	—
1975	14	−6.85%
1982	15	+0.99%
1990	52	+16.81%
1999	57	+1.03%
2007	63	+1.26%
2012	62	−0.32%
2017	56	−2.02%
2023	76	+5.22%
Source: INSEE

== See also ==
- Communes of the Isère department
