= Velika Planina Ski Resort =

Ski resort in Slovenia

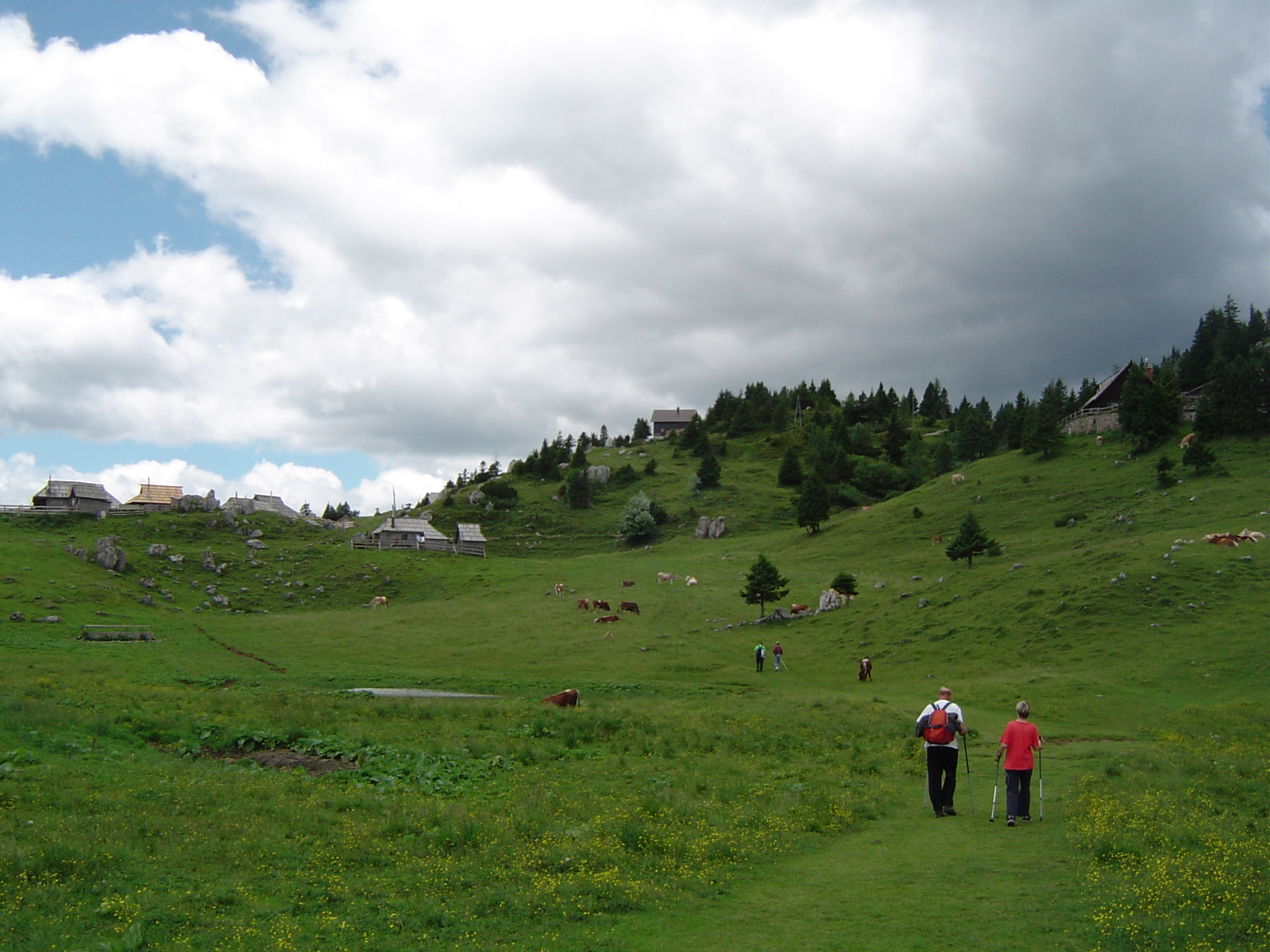
- Interactive map of Velika Planina Ski Resort
- Location: Kamniška Bistrica; Kamnik-Savinja Alps; Slovenia
- Nearest city: Kamnik
- Coordinates: 46.3045°N 14.6093°E
- Vertical: 254 m (833 ft)
- Top elevation: 1,412 m (4,633 ft)
- Base elevation: 1,666 m (5,466 ft)
- Skiable area: 100 acres (0.40 km^{2})
- Trails: Total 6 km 1 km 4 km 1 km
- Lift system: 8 total 1 funifor 6 surface 1 doublechair
- Snowmaking: no
- Website: velikaplanina.si/skiing

Velika Planina Ski Resort is a Slovenian ski resort located in Kamnik-Savinja Alps mountain in municipality of Kamnik. Velika Planina is a family ski resort, which has 6 km of ski slopes.

== Resort statistics ==
Elevation
Summit - 1666 m / (5,464)
Base - 1412 m / (4,364 ft)

Ski Terrain
0,4 km^{2} (100 acres) - covering 6 km (3.7 mi) of ski slopes on one mountain.

Slope Difficulty
expert (1 km)
intermediate (4 km)
beginner (1 km)

Vertical Drop
- 254 m - (833 ft) in total

Longest Run: "Šimnovec"

Average Winter Daytime Temperature:

Average Annual Snowfall:

Lift Capacity: 5,300 skiers per hour (all together)

Ski Season Opens: December

Ski Season Ends: April

Snow Conditions Phone Line: 386 (0)1 8327258

== Other activities ==
- mountain biking, hiking

== Ski lifts ==
Name	Length	Category
Šimnovec	1500m	red/black
Zeleni rob	800m	red/black
Jurček	300m	blue
