= Abzakovo, Baymaksky District, Republic of Bashkortostan =

Abzakovo Абзаково Абҙаҡ
- Village
- Location within Bashkortostan Location within Russia
- Coordinates: 52°48′N 58°29′E
- Country: Russia
- Region: Bashkortostan
- District: Baymaksky District
- Time zone: [[UTC+5:00]]

Abzakovo (Russian: Абзаково, Bashkir: Абҙаҡ, Abźaq) is a rural locality (a village) in Mukasovsky Selsoviet, Baymaksky District, Bashkortostan, Russia. The population was 144 as of 2010. There are 3 streets.

== Geography ==
Abzakovo is located 60 km northeast of Baymak (the district's administrative centre) by road. Akhmerovo is the nearest rural locality.

== Ethnicity ==
The village is inhabited by Bashkirs.
