= La Tania =

Ski resort in Savoie, France

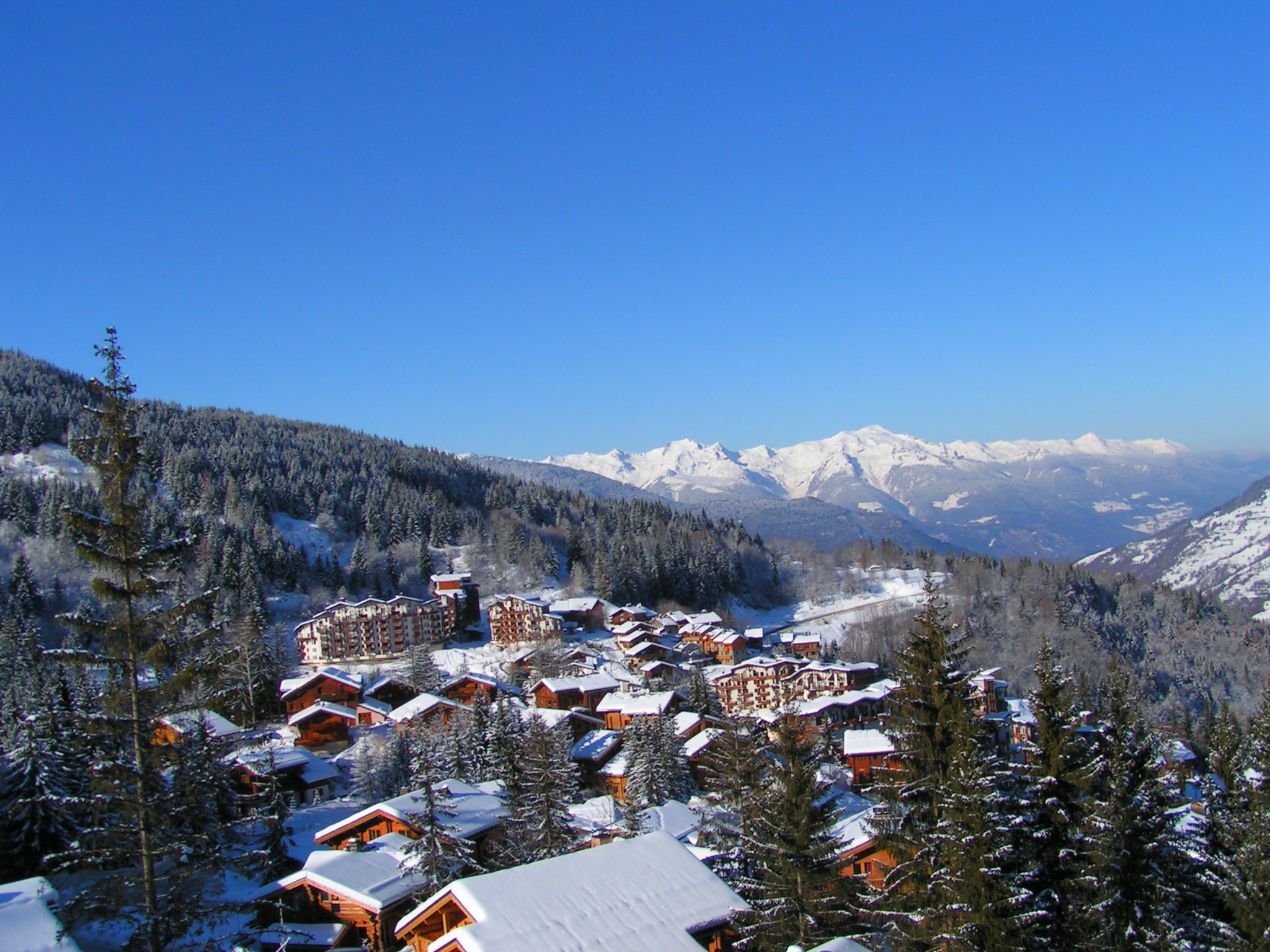
- La Tania

- Location within Alps
- Location: Savoie, France
- Nearest city: Chambéry
- Coordinates: 45°25′54″N 6°35′43″E
- Top elevation: 2,732 m (8,963 ft)
- Base elevation: 1,400 m (4,600 ft)
- Skiable area: 150km of pistes (Courchevel / La Tania area) 600km (3 Valleys)
- Trails: 100 (Courchevel / La Tania area) 335 (3 Valleys)
- Lift system: 57 (Courchevel / La Tania area) 182 (3 Valleys)
- Terrain parks: 1 (Courchevel / La Tania area) 5 (3 Valleys)
- Snowmaking: 700 Cannons (Courchevel / La Tania area) 2497 (3 Valleys)

La Tania is a ski resort situated in the Courchevel area of Les Trois Vallees, located at an elevation of 1400 meters. It was developed for the Albertville Olympics of 1992 and is approximately a 25-minute drive from Moûtiers.

== Overview ==
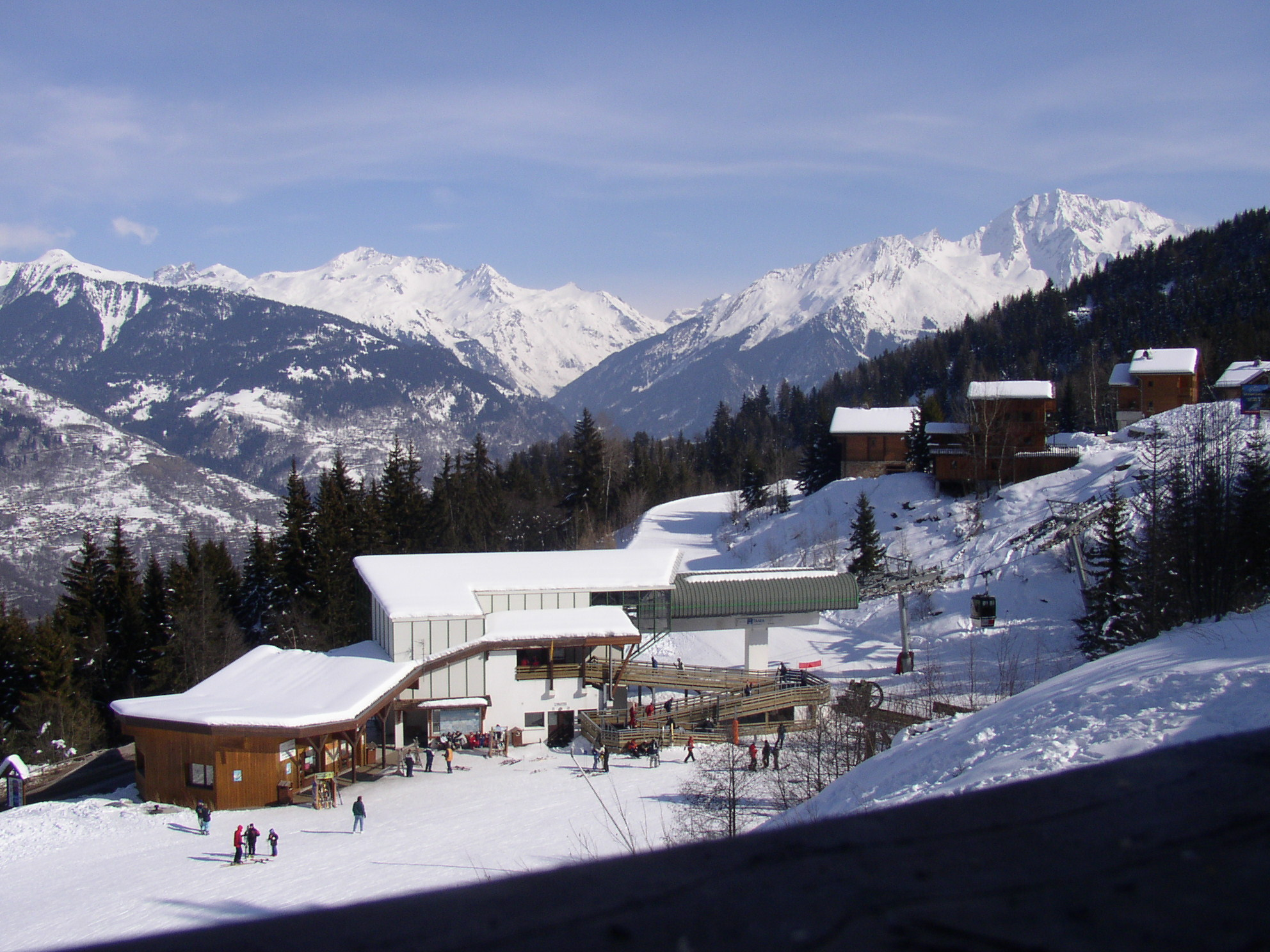
Image of the base ski-station in La Tania

The ski resort is near various hotels, residential buildings, and a small town.

The village is accessible via a 12-person gondola that connects to two high-speed chairs (Dou des Launches and Bouc Blanc), allowing skiers to access both the Courchevel and Meribel ski areas. A pair of drag lifts connects the Courchevel side of the mountain to the nearby village. La Tania is affiliated with ski schools like École du ski Français, Supreme Ski and Snowboard School, Magic In Motion, New Generation, Ultimate Snowsports, Cab9, Momentum Ski, and Ski Class.

From the top of the gondola, three pistes wind down through the forest into the village, designated as red, blue, and green. The blue and green pistes are equipped with snow cannons for year-round accessibility. La Tania also offers a free beginners drag lift known as Troika.

The northeast-facing slopes of La Tania often preserve powder conditions for several days, especially in the three Gazex couloirs off the Col de la Loze, numbered 1 through 3. Pub Le Ski Lodge is the central gathering place. The local community website, maintained by Toffa, posts updates on community events.

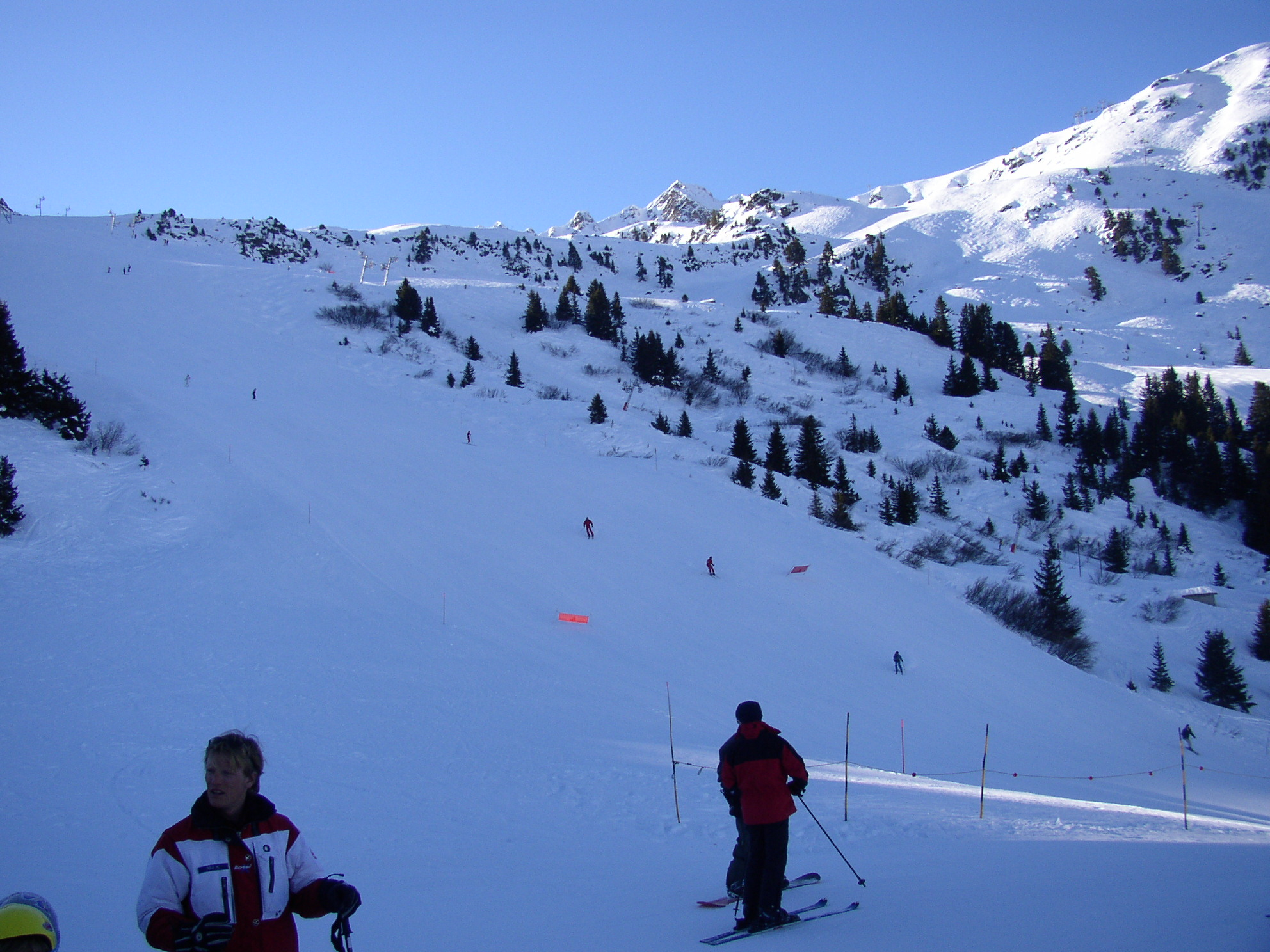
La Tania is known for its many wild ski-runs

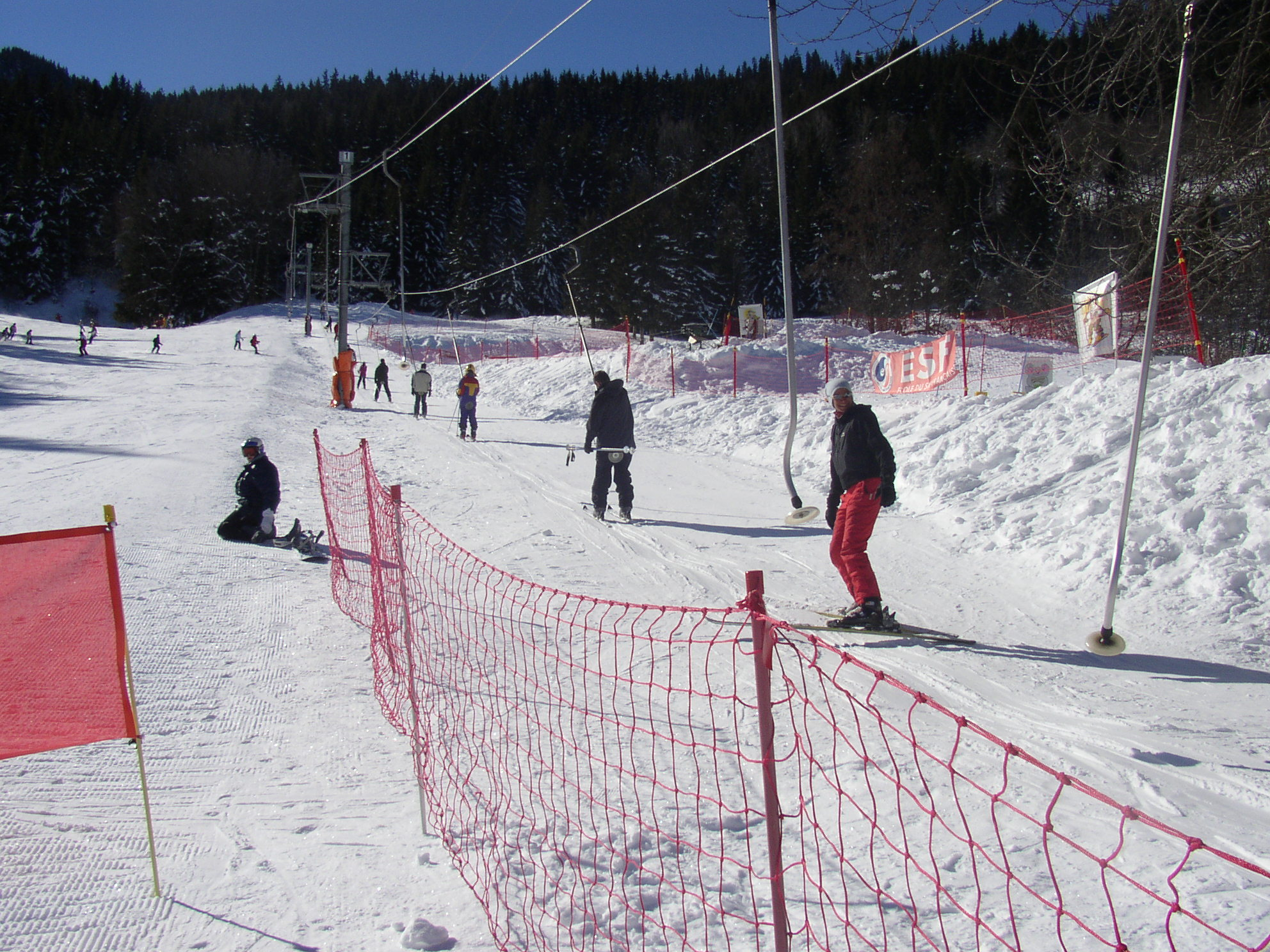
The beginners draglift, 'Troika', in action
