= Tavascan Pleta del Prat =

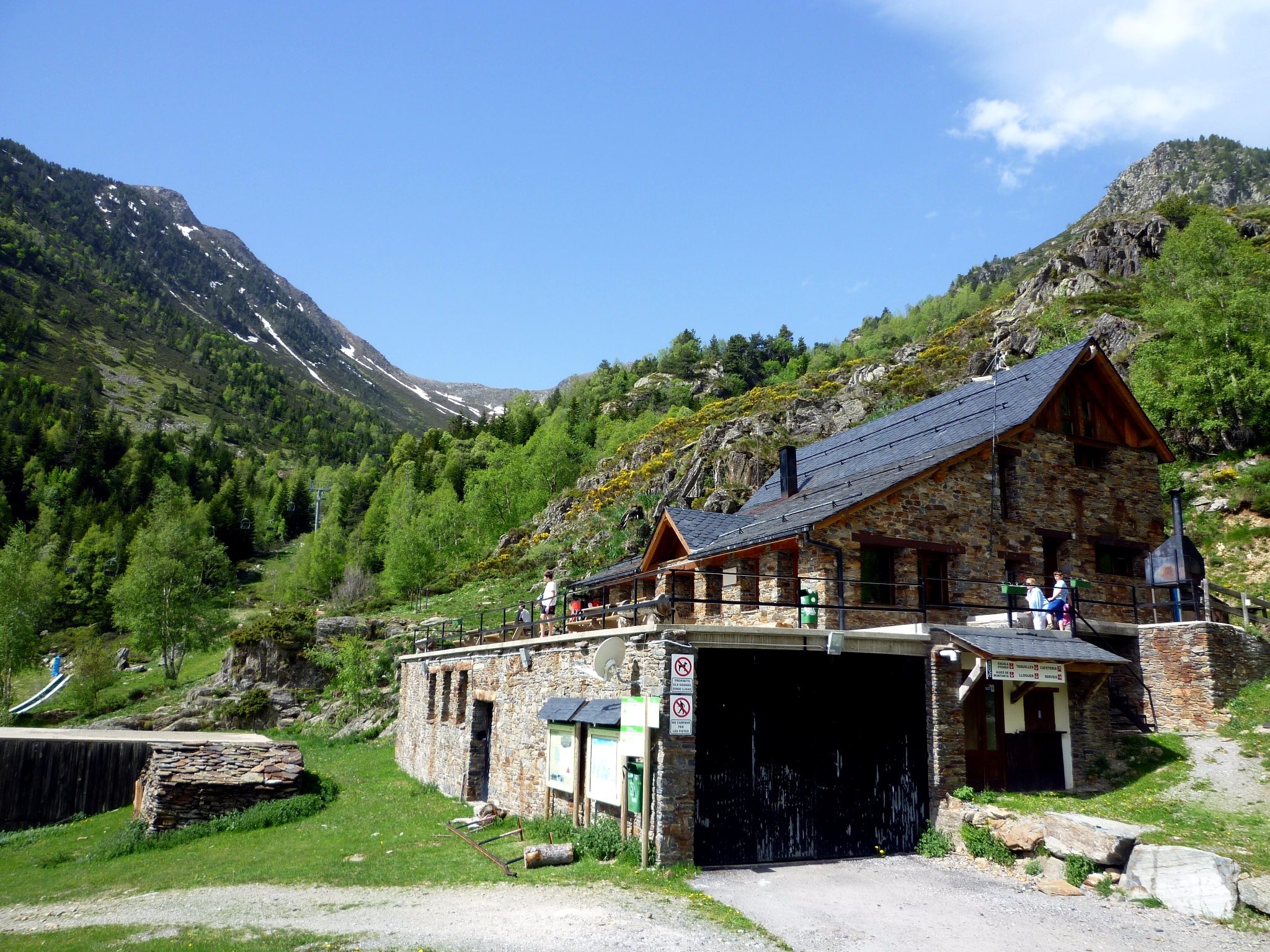
- Refuge of la Pleta del Prat
- Interactive map of Tavascan Pleta del Prat
- Location: Tavascan
- Coordinates: 42°40′43″N 1°13′10″E
- Top elevation: 2,250 metres (7,380 ft)
- Base elevation: 1,750 metres (5,740 ft)
- Trails: Black: 0 Red: 5 Blue: 0 Green: 1; 5 Total (5km)
- Lift system: 2 Total (1 Chairlift, 1 Platter lift)
- Website: www.tavascan.net

Tavascan - Pleta del Prat is a ski resort located around the refuge of la Pleta del Prat in the Mascarida valley. It is placed in the town of Tavascan, in the municipality of Lladorre, Catalonia. The resort is a mixed area with an alpine ski area that extends from 1,700 to 2,400 metres (5,600 to 7,900 ft) with 5 runs with a tandem lift of 500 metres (1,600 ft), and a Nordic ski area that has 17 kilometres (11 mi) of circuits between elevations of 1,750 and 2,100 metres (5,740 and 6,890 ft). The station opened in 1991.
