= Frenz =

Frenz is a surname. Notable people with the surname include:

- Horst Frenz (1912–1990), German-American literary scholar and professor
- Richardt Frenz (born 1992), South African cricketer
- Ron Frenz (born 1960), American comic book artist
- Uwe Frenz (born 1969), German judoka

== See also ==
- The Frenz Experiment, a 1988 album by The Fall
