= Parshevitsa =

Ski resort in Bulgaria

Coordinates: 43°8′35″N 23°28′34″E

Parshevitsa (Bulgarian: Пършевица) is a ski resort in the Balkan Mountains of Bulgaria. Located at 1,300 metres (4,300 ft) above sea level, it is located 25 kilometres (16 mi) from Vratsa and 112 kilometers from the capital, Sofia.
