= Rivisondoli =

- Comune
- Comune di Rivisondoli
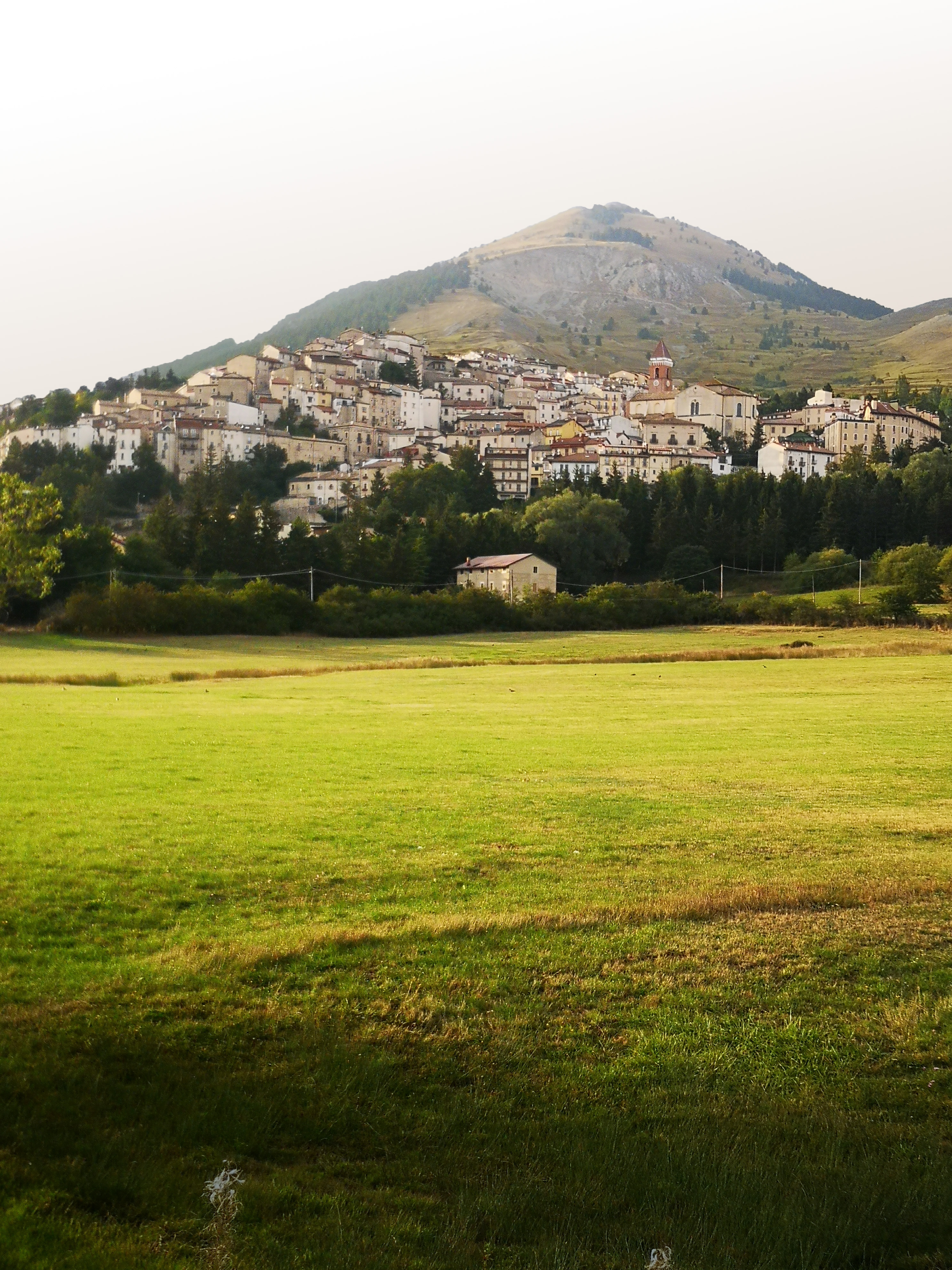

- Coat of arms

- Location within Italy Location within Abruzzo
- Coordinates: 41°52′16″N 14°4′3″E
- Country: Italy
- Region: Abruzzo
- Province: L'Aquila (AQ)

Government
  - Mayor: Roberto Ciampaglia

Area
  - Total: 31.61 km^{2} (12.20 sq mi)
- Elevation: 1,320 m (4,330 ft)

Population (9 August 2016)
  - Total: 688
  - Density: 21.8/km^{2} (56.4/sq mi)
- Demonym: Rivisondolesi
- Time zone: UTC+1 (CET)
  - Summer (DST): UTC+2 (CEST)
- Postal code: 67036
- Dialing code: 0864
- Patron saint: San Nicola
- Saint day: 6 December
- Website: Official website

Rivisondoli is a village and comune in the province of L'Aquila in the Abruzzo region of central Italy. It is a ski resort.

== Geography ==
The village is placed in the plateau of Cinque Miglia and extended on the flank of Monte Calvario.

== History ==
The small mountain town was first mentioned in 724 AD, in a diploma by Grimoald II, Duke of Benevento.

Rivisondoli rose in the 12th century in a strategic position along an important military and commercial route, the "Via degli Abruzzi" and was renowned for its production of weapons. A fire almost completely destroyed the village in 1792. Subsequently, the establishment of the Sulmona-Isernia railway helped the development of tourism. In 1913 the Italian royal family had its residence here.

== Economy ==
The village's economy is based on winter tourism, with many skilifts, chairlifts, hotels, restaurants, bars and pubs.
