= Abzakovo, Beloretsky District, Republic of Bashkortostan =

Abzakovo Абзаково Абҙаҡ
- Village
- Location within Bashkortostan Location within Russia
- Coordinates: 53°49′43″N 58°35′49″E
- Country: Russia
- Region: Bashkortostan
- District: Beloretsky District
- Time zone: UTC+5:00

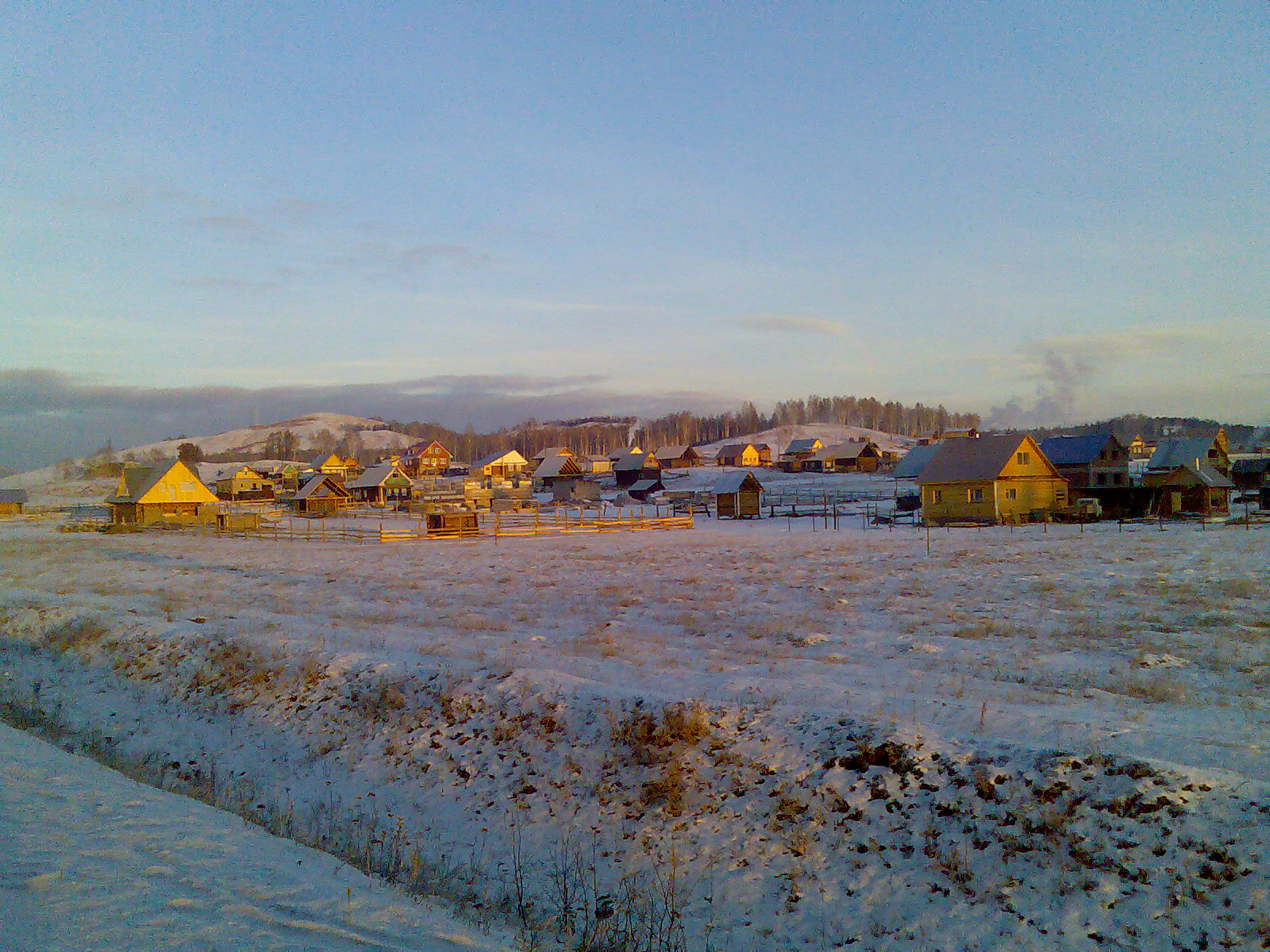
Abzakovo, Beloretsky District, Republic of Bashkortostan

Abzakovo (Russian: Абзаково; Bashkir: Абҙаҡ, Abźaq) is a rural locality (a selo) and the administrative center of Abzakovsky Selsoviet, Beloretsky District of the Republic of Bashkortostan, Russia.

A ski resort of the same name is located in the vicinity.
