= Tignes Val Claret =

Village in Tignes, Savoie, France

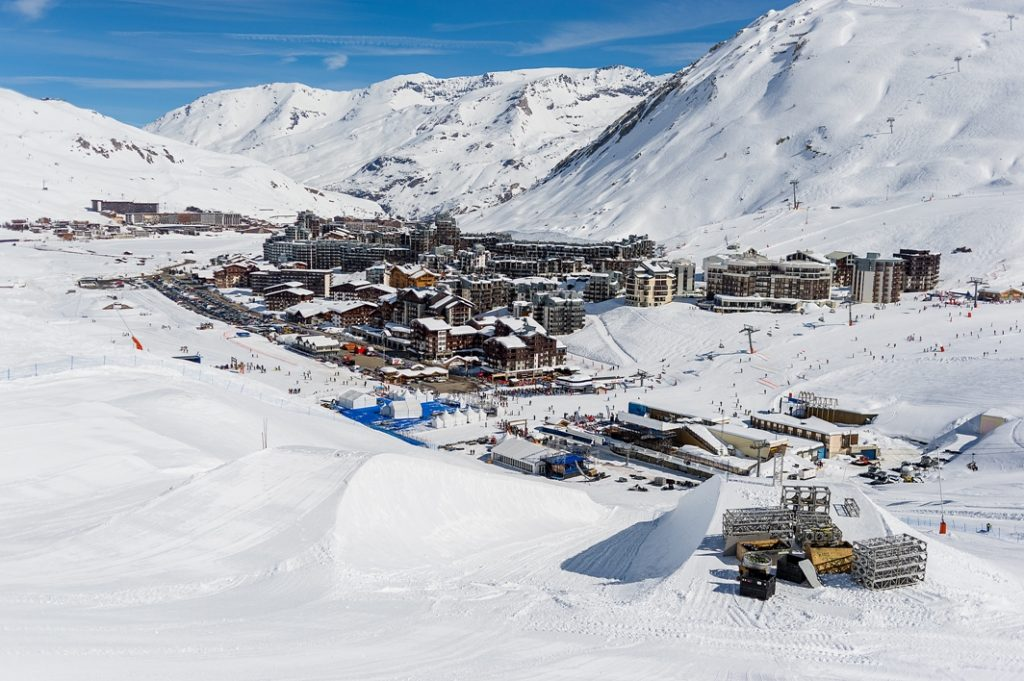
- Town of Val Claret from the top of the downhill slalom run
- Interactive map of Tignes Val Claret

Tignes Val Claret is the highest of the five villages that make up the Tignes Ski resort, sitting at 2,100 metres. It is the resort's newest village, built mainly in the 1960s as demand grew for skiing in the resort of Tignes.

Like many resorts built at this time, Tignes Val Claret was constructed primarily as a ski resort. The resort also offers tourism-based activities in the Summer, notably glacial skiing, mountain biking, golf and hiking.

== Overview ==
After deliberate flooding to prepare for a new damn, Tignes Val Claret was the last of the newly-built villages to be erected. It sits at the farthest end of Tignes and is also the highest of the five villages.

Like the other towns that make up Tignes, Val Claret also consists of different hamlets; the skiing hub Val Claret Grande Motte, Val Claret Centre and the stand-alone chalets in the Les Chartreux area, adjacent to the main town.

== Skiing ==
The town, due to its purpose-built nature, offers quick access to the mountains from chairlifts, most of which are centered in the 'Ronde Point' area. The town is also the gateway to the glacial skiing offered by the Tignes resort, reached via the Funicular and the Grande Motte cable car, the only cable car in the world to offer an outdoor viewing platform.

Val Claret is linked directly to the ski area of Val D'Isere by two lifts, Tuffs and Fresse.

== Town ==
=== Architecture ===
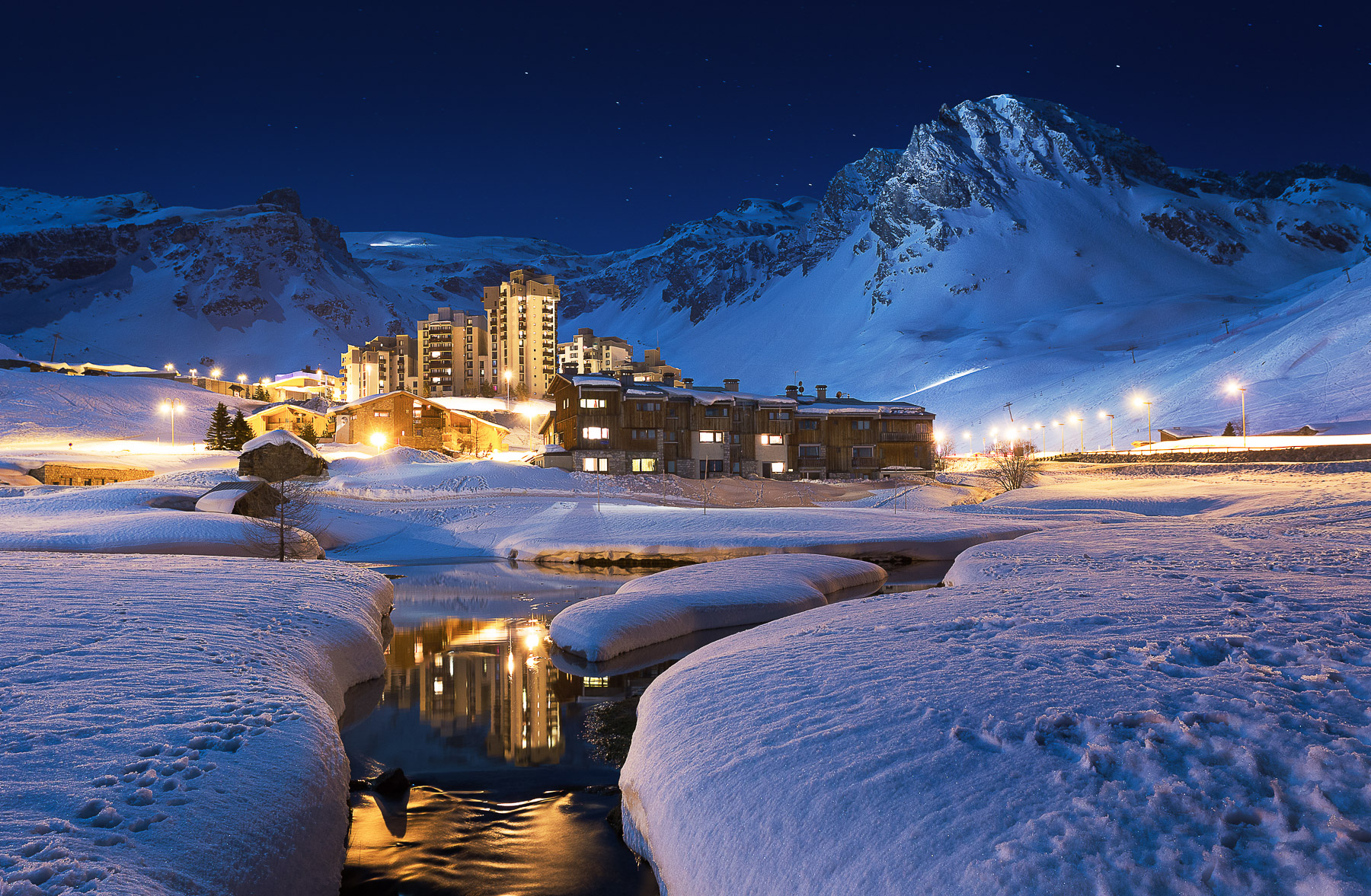
View from the lake towards the village in the foreground with the Grande Motte in the back.

The town, like much of the Alps, was subject extensive remodelling in the post-war ski boom throughout the 1960s to the 1980s. In comparison to the neighbouring Tignes Le Lac, however, by the time Val Claret was built, greater consideration was given during the resort's planning stages, which resulted in a greater level of functionality than that of its neighbour.

=== Accommodation ===
Most accommodations offered are apartment-style or in hotel format, though a few chalets are available around the edge of the town beside the golf course in the summer.

=== Apres-Ski ===
'Cocorico' is a popular destination for après-ski recreation. The Bollin restaurant located on the mountain is increasingly an après-ski destination.

=== Bars/Restaurants ===
Val Claret has a variety of bars, pubs and restaurants, many of which are situated along the high street that runs through the town centre.

== Future Development ==
Val Claret is set to be the home of Ski Line, which will be the largest indoor ski slope in Europe, in a bid to combat climate change. In the winter months, the indoor slope will use real snow, while snow-making will provide artificial snow in the summer. The development will also add a 1,050-bedroom Club Med hotel. The development had been planned for completion in 2018 but remains under construction as of 2021.
