= MEDFORIST =

MEDFORIST is a project aimed at implementing a Euro-Mediterranean network for sharing information systems and technology (IST) resources. Started in August 2002, MEDFORIST is a project of the Euro-Mediterranean Information Society (EUMEDIS), an initiative of the European Union, ultimately aimed at establishing an EU-MED free trade zone by 2010 and setting up an information network system among European and Mediterranean universities and institutes in the field of information technology (IT). The project is coordinated by Centre TIME of the Grenoble école de management.

== Objectives ==
- The development of a business network comprising educators from the partner institutions who are specialists in information and communication technologies (ICT) and their implementation in commerce and industry
- The development of jointly developed and shared learning resources and the supporting technological platform and knowledge base
- Teaching students and executives in the member countries about the design and implementation of ICT-based applications for the management of local industrial and commercial companies.
- Associating local partners from other academic and vocational training institutions as well as intermediary organizations like the chamber of commerce and industry or professional associations
- Dissemination towards the key stakeholders of countries to guarantee the promotion of the project and its sustainability.

== Project goals ==
Following the completion of the project the following goals are hoped to have been met:

- Determine the needs for competencies and training in the field of ICT-based applications in the management of industrial and commercial companies.
- Establishment of a database with the status on ICT in each country.
- Creation of a network consisting of about 50 professors from the partners institutions sharing the learning resources.
- Learning resources will consist of web-based pedagogic materials adapted to the context of each country on the different topics of ICT-based applications for management, including topics like e-business strategy, electronic commerce and procurement, supply chain management, customer relationship management, enterprise resource planning, and change management.
- Seminars conducted in each country targeted to different user groups including under graduate students, post graduate students, managers and executives.
- Diffusion of the teaching and dissemination of the results of the project will have been made widely available through the web site of the project, editorials, seminars, communication in the media, international conferences and articles in specialised magazine review.

=== Integration ===
The integrating activities have two levels:

1. The project management is a task for the steering committee composed with the project leader, a manager by sub-project, and a manager by Mediterranean country. This steering committee will meet in a regular way to plan the actions, to solve the difficulties and evaluate the results. This steering committee will be assisted by a technical committee in charge with the implementation of the actions in each sub-project and by a technical advisor in charge with the evaluation of the deliverables.
2. Transversal activities of the sub-projects are constituted by the training of the trainers, the realisation of the technological platform, the realisation of the study on competencies, the animation of the network development and the actions of dissemination and timelessness of the project activities.

== See also ==
- Euromediterranean Partnership
