= Funiculaire du Perce-Neige =

Funicular in France

Coordinates: 45.4354°N 6.9020°E

The Funiculaire du Perce-Neige in Tignes, France is an underground Funicular from the neighborhood Val Claret to the summer-skiing area and the lower station of the Telepherique Grande Motte.

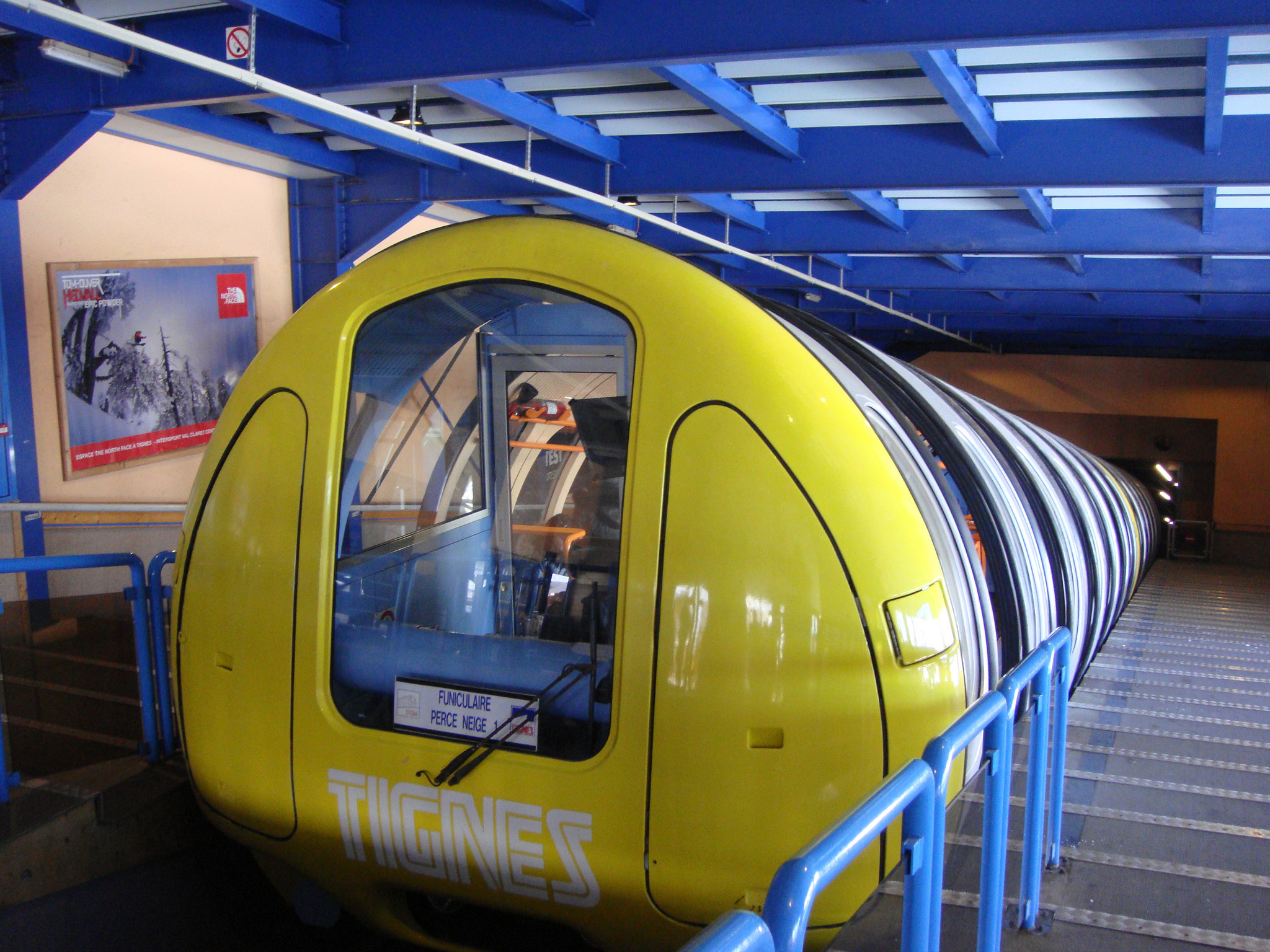
Funiculaire Perce-Neige à Tignes

== General information ==
The Perce-Neige transports the passenger from Val Claret at 2,100 m (6,890 ft). in 6 minutes to the slopes of the Grande Motte. On arrival at 3,032 m (9,948 ft) one can transfer to the Grande Motte cable-car that brings the skier to 3,456 m (11,339 ft), the highest point in Tignes.

The system opened on 15 June 1989. The name Perce-Neige is a play on words, in that perce-neige is the French word for a snowdrop but can also be interpreted more literally as the funicular that pierces through the snow.

== Technical details ==
Du Perce-Neige
name	value
Number of trains:	2
cabins per train:	2
Altitude base station:	2,100 m (6,890 ft).
Altitude mountain station:	3,032 m (9,948 ft).
difference:	932 m (3,058 ft).
slope length:	3,484 m (11,430 ft).
speed:	12 metres per second (39.37 ft/s)
track width:	1,200 mm (3 ft 11 1/4 in)
diameter pulling cable:	52 mm (2.05 in).
trip length:	6 minutes
Builder:	Von Roll
maximum gradient:	30%
average gradient:	18%
capacity:	3000 persons/hour
capacity per train:	334 passengers+1 conductor (167 per train)
smallest tunnel diameter:	3.9 m (12 ft 10 in)
Power:	3 engines totaling 2,900 kW (3,900 hp).
location:	mountain station
make:	SICME MOTORI
length dual tube passing loop:	203 m (666 ft) (passing area)
train mass:	32 tonnes (31 long tons; 35 short tons) empty, 58.8 tonnes (57.9 long tons; 64.8 short tons) maximum

== See also ==
- List of funicular railways
- Funival
