= Grande Motte (tramway) =

Grande Motte tramway
- Interactive map of Grande Motte tramway

Overview
- Elevation: lowest: 3034 m highest: 3456 m
- Construction begin: 1975

Operation
- Carrier capacity: 115 +1
- Trip duration: 5 minutes

Technical features
- Line length: 1640 m
- No. of support towers: 1
- Maximum Gradient: 55%

Téléphériques de la Grande Motte is an aerial tramway in the French ski-resort Espace Killy. The tramway climbs the mountain peak with the same name in Tignes.

The valley station can be reached using the funicular du Perce-Neige or a combination of chairlifts. From the mountain station one can enter the ski-slopes or climb to the top of the mountain some 300 metres higher.

== Technical details ==
The system has two main cabins or gondolas, each carried on two main cables and a loop of a pulling cable and a secondary cable on the valley side of each cabin.

The mountain station is an open construction with a wide pulley returning the pull rope and the anchorage of the four main cables.

The powerplant is in the valley station and consists of two groups of electric powered motors, gearbox and a built-in hydraulic motor for emergency operation. The hydraulic motors can be operated using a diesel engine to run the oil-pump.
