= GEM Altigliss Challenge =

Annual ski and snowboard event

- Association Established: 1985
- First Edition: 2005
- Sponsors: KPMG; ESF La Plagne; Grenoble École de Management
- Location: La Plagne Bellecote La Plagne bellecote (France)

GEM Altigliss Challenge is the biggest ski and snowboard student event in Europe. The week-long event is organized annually in March by Altigliss, a student association of Grenoble École de Management. It is classified by the newspaper Le Point Etudiants as the third biggest event organized by a student association in 2013. GEM Altigliss Challenge is the biggest ski and snowboard student event in Europe. The week-long event is organized annually in March by Altigliss, a student association of Grenoble École de Management. The challenge unites an average of a 1000 university students combining more than 25 nationalities, from 30 Grandes écoles and other European universities. The challenge is held at Val-d’Isère, ski resort in the Rhône-Alpes region of France.

== History ==
This challenge had originally begun in 2004 under the name of Altigliss Challenge. In 2011, the name was officially changed to GEM Altigliss Challenge following to increasing popularity of the event. The first official edition of GEM Altigliss Challenge took place in February 2012.

== Challenges ==
The traditional challenges of the GEM Altigliss Challenge are the Ski Challenge, The Mountain Challenge and the Village Challenge.

=== Ski Challenge ===
The Ski Challenge consists in five different events listed below:

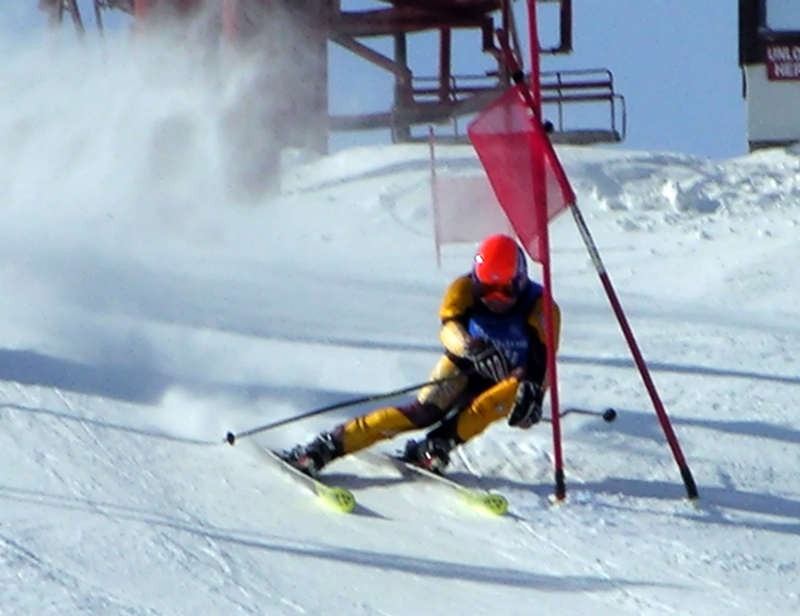
Giant slalom Ski Racer

- Le Slalom Géant (Giant slalom) is the opening event of the GEM Altigliss challenge. Participants must slide down a winding track through poles as quickly as possible to win the first round.
- Le Boarder Cross involves four teams competing against each other on a timed rocky obstacle course.
- Le Big Air is an event where participants jump on a trampoline to perform intricate tricks to impress a panel of judges.
- Le Slalom Spécial is the most technical event of the Ski Challenge. It differs from Le Slalom Geant with narrower gates and a shorter course.
- Le Slalom Parallèle is a team challenge composed of a qualifying and a final round. Four best teams in the overall running compete to score the most points.

=== Mountain Challenge ===
The Mountain Challenge is a recent addition to the GEM Altigliss. The winner receives prizes from the event's sponsors. The mountain challenge is made up of the following four events:

- Course D’Orientation (Orienteering Course). The participants have to find tags which are distributed around Espace Killy with a given map of the resort and a compass.
- Chasse au Trésor (Treasure Hunt). Participants solve various puzzles scattered around the corners of the ski area to find a grand prize.
- "From A to B" is a team race. Every team starts off at Point A and the goal is to make it to Point B first. Any kind of transport is allowed. This includes skis, snowboard, telemark, car, bus, motorcycle, snowshoes and anything else participants can think of.
- Derby is a team race where each team must descend down a chosen track in record time. The winning team is the one whose last member arriving has the shortest time of descent.

=== Village Challenge ===
The Village Challenge is the entertainment program of the GEM Altigliss Challenge. This includes:

- Indoor and outdoor activities (games, sledding, tobogganing)
- Parties at the local nightclubs, Le Graal and La Doudoune
- Best-dressed contest

== Ride Her First ==
Ride Her First is a freestyle skiing contest which takes place during the GEM Altigliss Challenge. During the competition professional freeskiers and snowboarders perform tricks on a specially prepared obstacle course. The event is usually combined with a DJ performance and it is graded 2 stars in the Ticket to Ride (World Snowboard Tour).

=== Event format ===
The finals of Ride Her First are divided into two parts. The first official part is a team contest in which riders perform tricks on the course, in groups of three. The teams are judged by style, technique and synchronization of the tricks. The best groups are rewarded with prizes in skiing and snowboarding equipment. The second part of the finals is the free session, during which competitors are rewarded with a cash prize. The amount of money received by a rider depends on the reaction of the crowd to his performance. However, the contest itself is open only to professionals. Amateurs can only take part in the qualifications, but not the finals, which take place the day before the main competition. Amateurs can win a 'wild card' which enables them to enter the main contest.

==== Obstacles and course aspect ====
The course for Ride Her First is divided into the Jump and the Rail sections. The challenge takes place at Val Park Terrain park. The event course usually features a jump from the top of the slope followed by rails at the bottom.

== Disabled sports ==
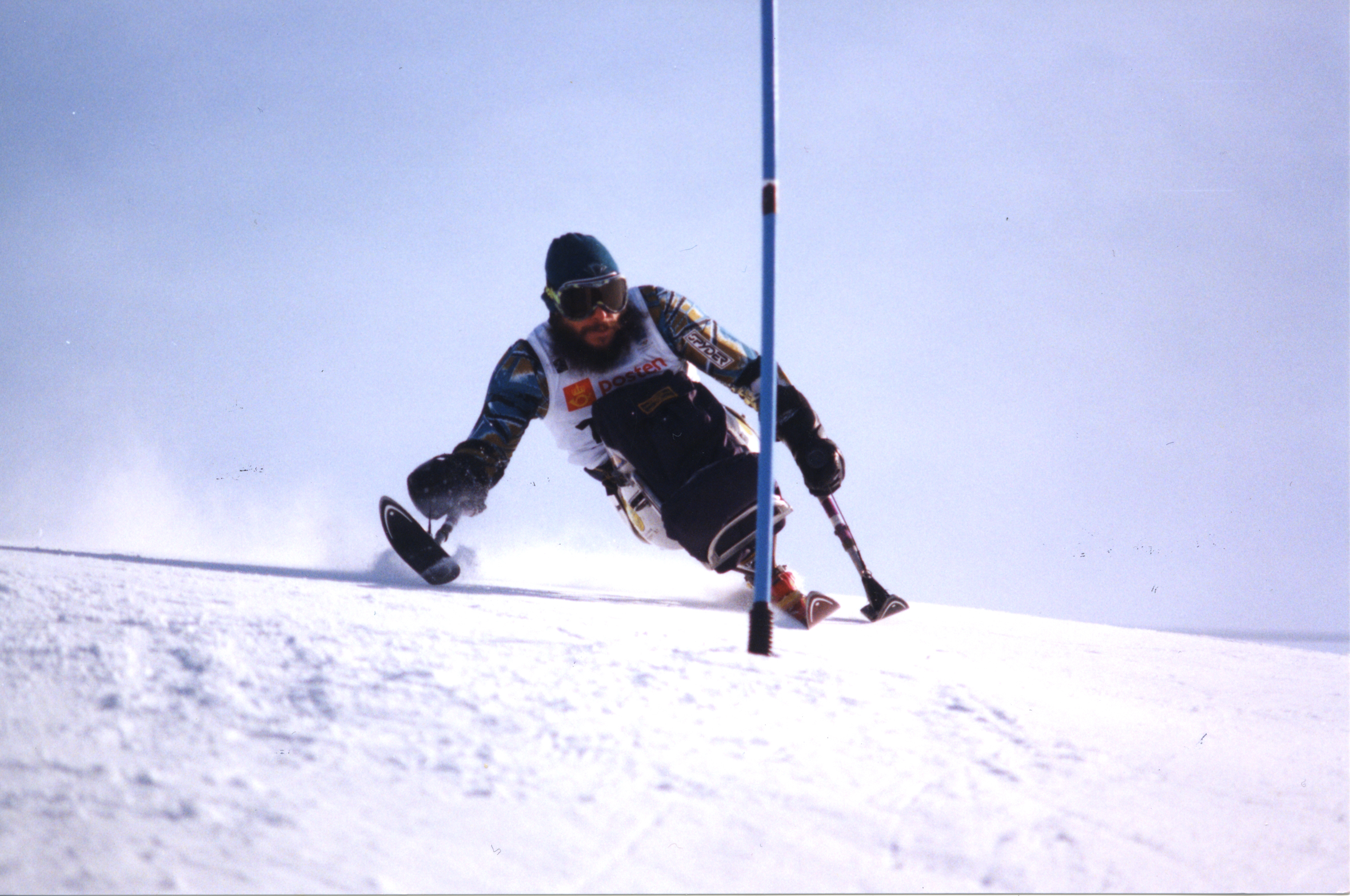

In the GEM Altigliss Challenge, one day (Thursday, March 29, 2014) is dedicated to the disabled participants. The reason for the Disabled sports day, is due to the history of Alpine skiing. Alpine skiing was one of the first sports made available for disabled athletes. Therefore, ski resorts have adapted to the growing demand of having disabled-accessible infrastructures and possibilities in their areas. During the GEM Altigliss Challenge, athletes have the opportunity to test dual ski and stabilo, and are able to train for Para-alpine skiing, organized by professional ski instructors.

== Location ==
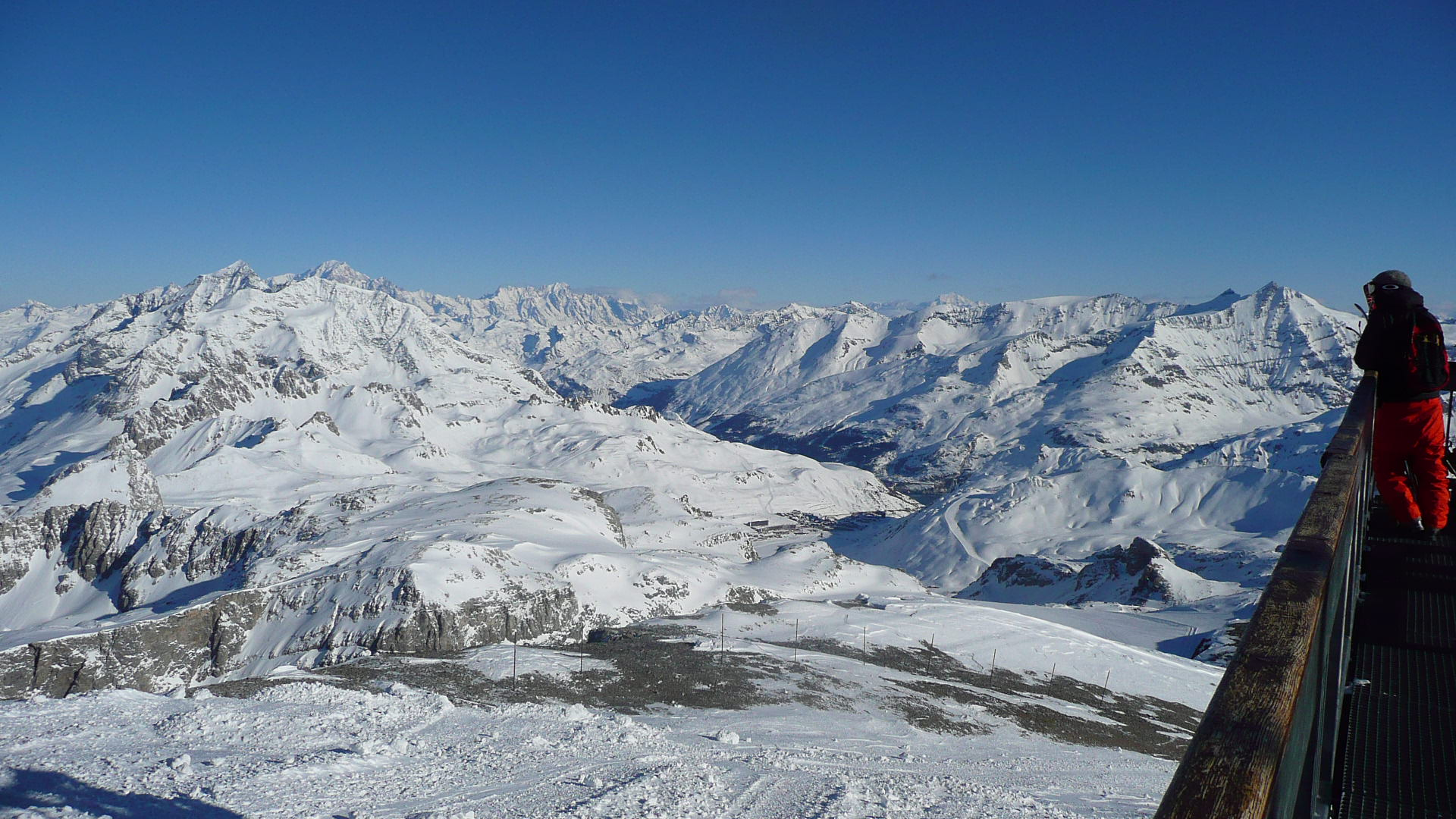
Espace Killy

GEM Altigliss Challenge is held annually in the ski destination of Val d’Isère. The event lasts one complete week. It is located 166 km from Grenoble, home of Grenoble École de Management and the Altigliss association; the university ski and snowboard world cup remains accessible to many students of the area. Val d’Isère provides the setting for a week of competition, offering a range of slopes and panorama for participants and the public experience. The resort is situated 240 km from Lyon and 220 km from Geneva, as well as 5 km from the Franco-Italian border.
