= Funival =

Coordinates: 45°27′33″N 6°57′51″E

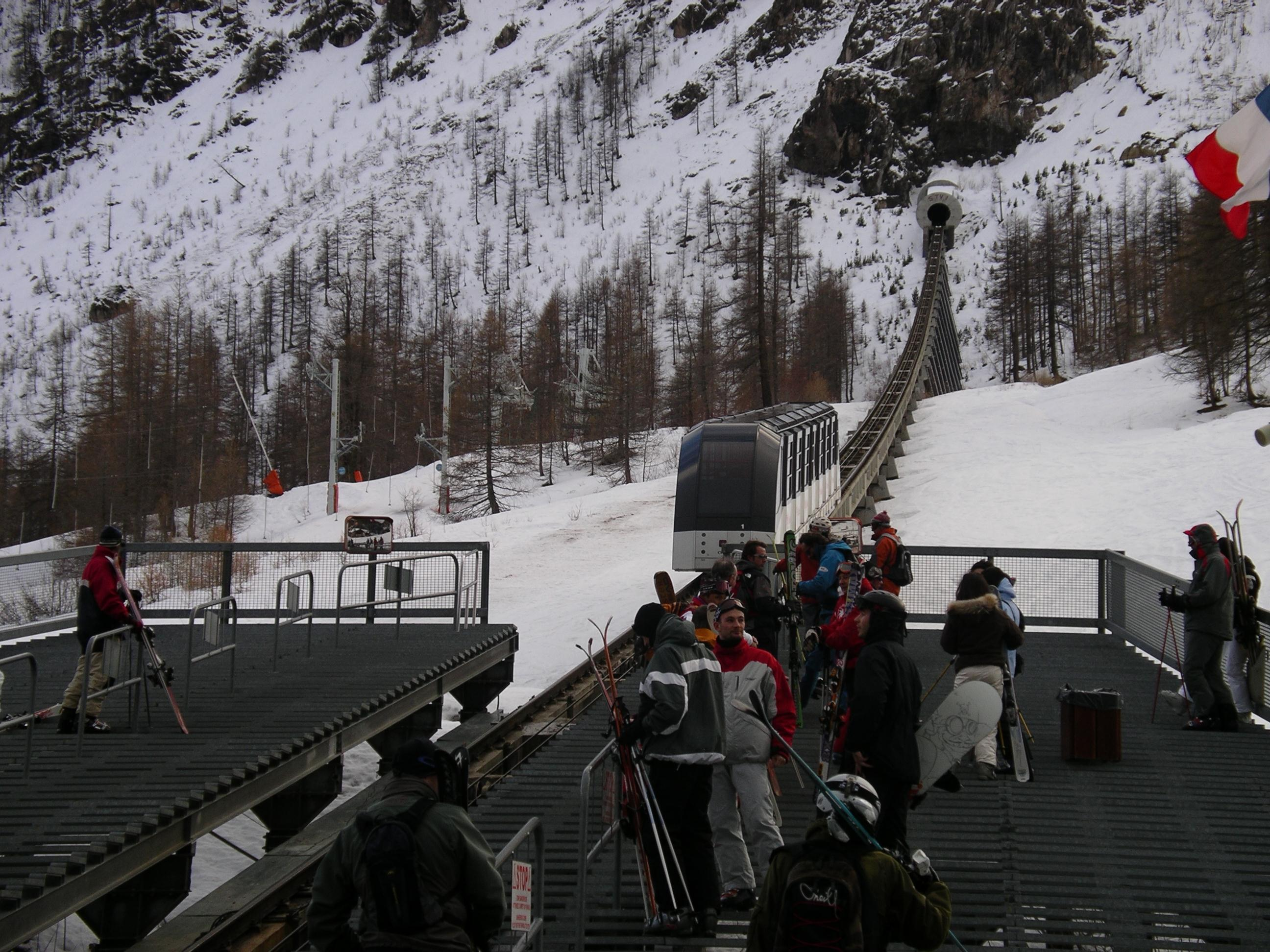
The Funival to the summit of Bellevarde

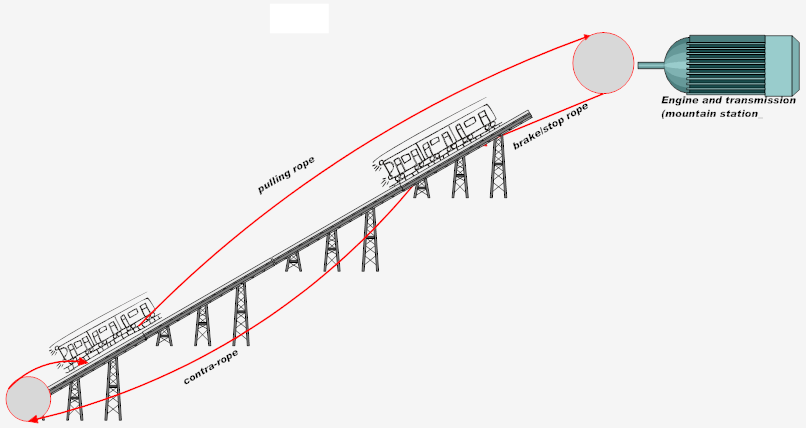
Simplified working of the Funival

The Funival is a 1,200 mm (3 ft 11 1/4 in) gauge funicular railway in Val-d'Isère, France

The Funival starts above ground in La Daille and after a few hundred meters it enters a tunnel ending at the mountain station on top of the Bellevarde.
The Funival uses two trains, connected by cables, on a single track. Halfway, a short section of dual track (passing loop) allows the trains to pass each other.

== Description ==
A single track starts in La Daille from where the train runs up an elevated track for 580 m (1,903 ft). The remaining 1,720 m (5,643 ft). runs through a drilled tunnel. Halfway a section of double track allows the climbing train to pass the downward train. A cable runs from the front of the lower train, via a construction of electric powered pulleys in the mountain station to the back of the descending train. The mass of the descending train helps pull the climbing train and electric motors provide the power to overcome the weight difference between the climbing and descending trains plus any friction.

During most runs the climbing train will be far heavier than the descending train as the main function of the Funival is to take skiers to the top of the mountain. If the descending train is heavier than the climbing (when more passengers travel down than up) the electric motors can work as brakes. Each train is also provided with mechanical brakes to act as emergency brakes if the main cable should break. Although the Funival runs summer and winter it was primarily built to bring skiers to the top of the mountain.

== Technical details ==
Funiculaire Funival
name	value
Altitude base station	1,797 m (5,896 ft)
Altitude mountain station	2,689 m (8,822 ft)
Climb	892 m (2,927 ft)
track length	2,300 m (7,546 ft).
length viaduct	580 m (1,903 ft)
length tunnel	1,720 m (5,643 ft)
Maximum gradient	53%
Location engines	mountain station
capacity train	220 persons
capacity per hour	2425 persons/hour.
speed	12 metres per second (39.37 ft/s)
Inventor of Funiculaires	Dennis Creissels
Architect	Marc Albert
Producer	Montaval
Engineering	BOTTO
Technical installation	Waagner-Birò et Montaval
Total costs in 1987	60 Million French franc (≈€9,13 million)
civil engineering	38 M FF (≈€ 5,79 million)
technical installation	22 M FF (≈€ 3,35 million)
Construction year	1987

== See also ==
- List of funicular railways
- Funiculaire du Perce-Neige
