= Val-d'Isère =

- Commune
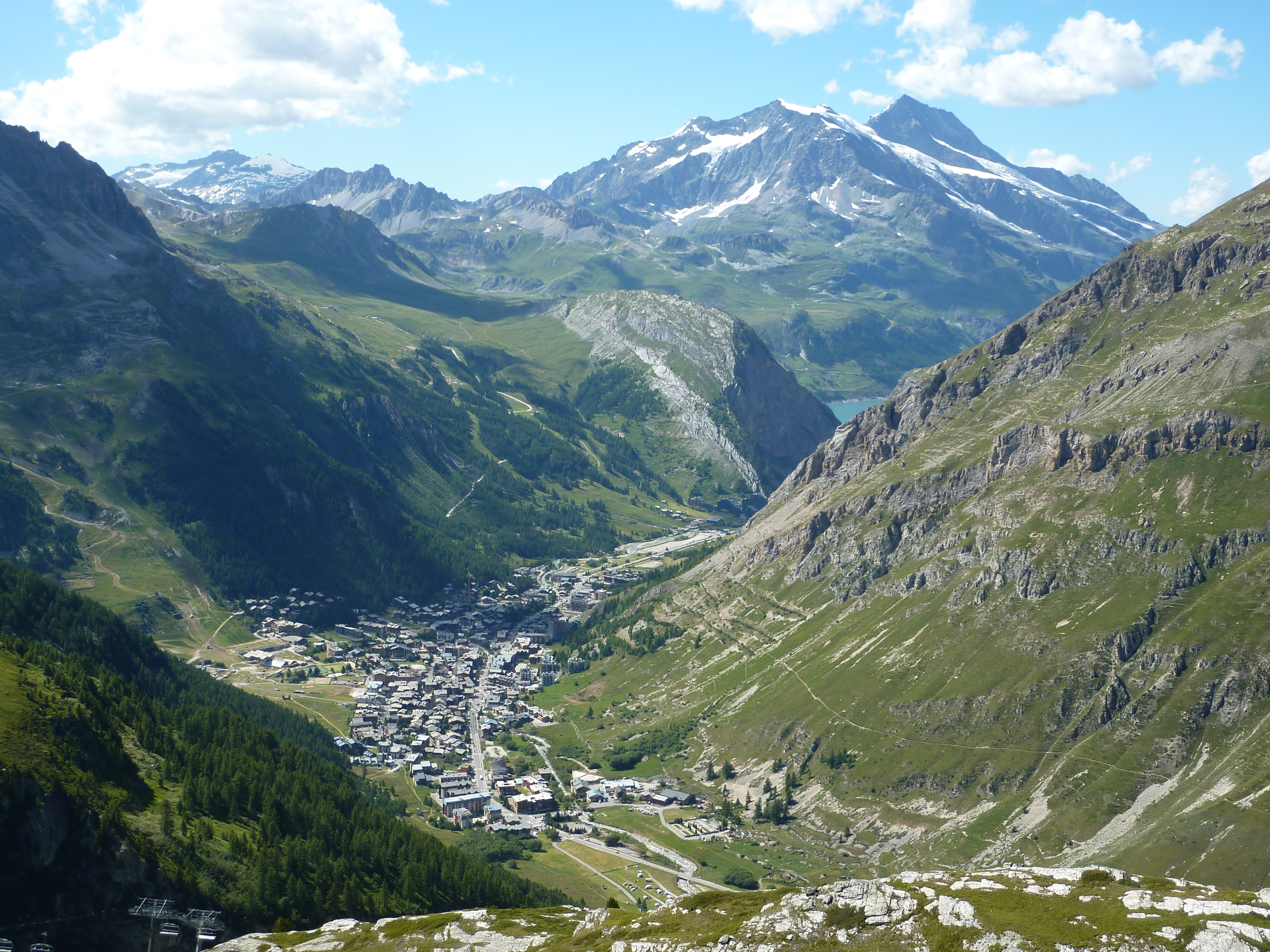
- A general view of Val d'Isère.

- Coat of arms
- Location of Val-d'Isère
- Location within France Location within Auvergne-Rhône-Alpes
- Coordinates: 45°27′02″N 6°58′41″E
- Country: France
- Region: Auvergne-Rhône-Alpes
- Department: Savoie
- Arrondissement: Albertville
- Canton: Bourg-Saint-Maurice

Government
  - Mayor (2020–2026): Patrick Martin
- Area^{1}: 94.39 km^{2} (36.44 sq mi)
- Elevation: 1,849 m (6,066 ft)
- Highest elevation: 3,599 m (11,808 ft)
- Lowest elevation: 1,785 m (5,856 ft)
- Population (2023): 1,567
  - Density: 16.60/km^{2} (43.00/sq mi)
- Time zone: UTC+01:00 (CET)
  - Summer (DST): UTC+02:00 (CEST)
- INSEE/Postal code: 73304 /73150
- ^{1} French Land Register data, which excludes lakes, ponds, glaciers > 1 km^{2} (0.386 sq mi or 247 acres) and river estuaries.

Val-d'Isère (French pronunciation: [val dizɛʁ], literally Valley of Isère; Arpitan: Laval; Italian: Val d'Isero) is a commune of the Tarentaise Valley, in the Savoie department (Auvergne-Rhône-Alpes region) in southeastern France. It lies 5 km (3 mi) from the border with Italy. It is on the border of the Vanoise National Park created in 1963, with good transport links in and out of Lyon, Geneva and Chambéry.

During the Albertville 1992 Winter Olympics, the Face de Bellevarde was the site of the men's downhill race. Other alpine skiing events held during those games included men's giant slalom and alpine combined. Val d'Isère regularly hosts World Cup alpine events, usually for the men in early December, and hosted the World Championships in 2009. The ski area of Val d'Isère and Tignes forms the Espace Killy, named after the triple Olympic champion Jean-Claude Killy who grew up in Val d'Isère. There are two mountain huts (called “refuges” in French) owned by the Vanoise National Park on the territory of Val d'Isère: le Refuge du Prariond and le Refuge du Fond des Fours.

== Skiing and snowsports ==
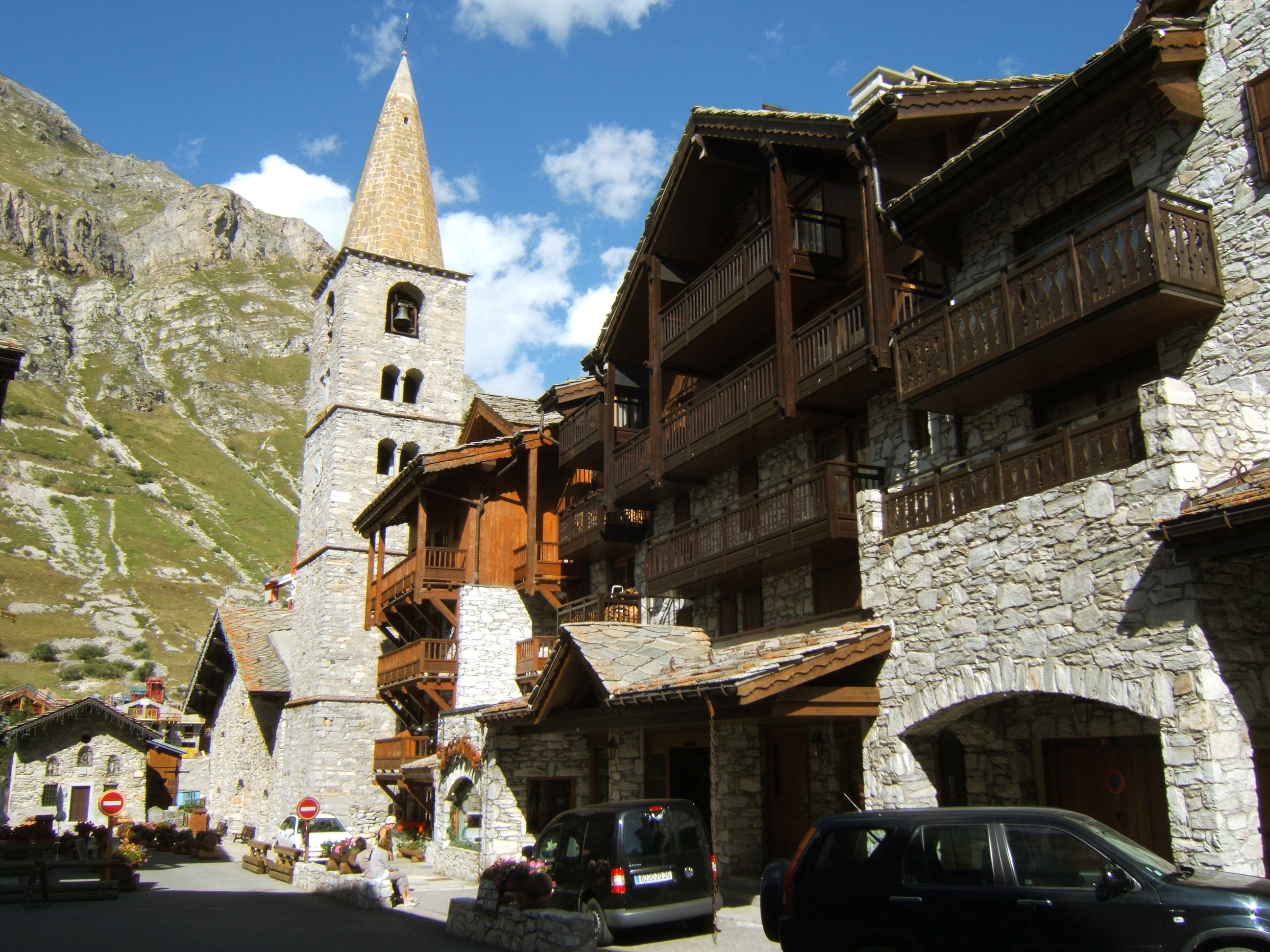
View in the center of Val d'Isère

The western and central areas of Val d'Isère are most recognizable by their "chalet" architecture, while in the eastern part of the town high-rise architecture dominates the landscape. Along with nearby Tignes the area forms part of the "l' Espace Killy", the self-titled "Most Beautiful Ski Area in the World".

The Pissaillas Glacier offers summer skiing, as well as the usual winter fare. Snow cannon are placed on certain slopes to accommodate heavy skiing. The ski slopes themselves are equipped with a high-volume gondola, able to transport standing skiers, the funicular Funival from La Daille via a tunnel to the top of Bellevarde, traditional chair lifts—some with windshields and many detachable, button/disc-pulls and tow-ropes. There are both groomed slopes and backcountry (off-piste) skiing. The slopes' difficulty levels are particularly high. However, as in Tignes, there are wide, easily navigable pistes for those of the beginner-intermediate level as well. Val d'Isère is renowned as having some of the world's best lift-accessed off-piste and has many independent instructors and guides who specialise in off-piste tuition and guiding.

Tignes possesses more of the same, with a funicular shuttling skiers up through one of the mountains to the Grande Motte glacier. A free shuttle bus runs between the villages in the valley, providing free transport throughout the towns of Val d'Isère and La Daille.

== History ==
Human habitation of the valley dates back to before Roman times with traces of Celtic tribes found in the area. The town received parish rights in 1637 and the parish church, which is still a landmark in the town centre, was built in 1664. Val-d'Isere was part of the historical land of Savoy emerged as the feudal territory of the House of Savoy during the 11th to 14th centuries. The historical territory is shared between the modern countries of France, Italy, and Switzerland. The House of Savoy became the longest surviving royal house in Europe. It ruled the County of Savoy to 1416 and then the Duchy of Savoy from 1416 to 1860. Skiing in Val d'Isère has its roots in the 1930s when a drag lift was built on the slopes of the Solaise. This was followed by an aerial tramway (cable car). During WWII, the village secretly housed Jewish children; the former mayor of the village, Dr. Frederic Petri, sheltered a young woman in his chalet and nursed her broken leg.

== Geography ==
=== Climate ===
Val-d'Isère has a subarctic climate (Köppen climate classification Dfc). The average annual temperature in Val-d'Isère is 3.8 °C (38.8 °F). The average annual rainfall is 912.9 mm (35.94 in) with December as the wettest month. The temperatures are highest on average in July, at around 12.5 °C (54.5 °F), and lowest in January, at around −4.6 °C (23.7 °F). The highest temperature ever recorded in Val-d'Isère was 29.3 °C (84.7 °F) on 27 June 2019; the coldest temperature ever recorded was −25.2 °C (−13.4 °F) on 31 December 2000.

Climate data for Val-d'Isère (1991−2020 normals, extremes 1992−present)
Month	Jan	Feb	Mar	Apr	May	Jun	Jul	Aug	Sep	Oct	Nov	Dec	Year
Record high °C (°F)	11.4 (52.5)	11.1 (52.0)	13.1 (55.6)	16.8 (62.2)	23.9 (75.0)	29.3 (84.7)	28.2 (82.8)	28.3 (82.9)	25.0 (77.0)	21.1 (70.0)	19.1 (66.4)	10.5 (50.9)	29.3 (84.7)
Mean daily maximum °C (°F)	−0.4 (31.3)	0.4 (32.7)	3.4 (38.1)	6.4 (43.5)	11.7 (53.1)	16.4 (61.5)	18.5 (65.3)	18.1 (64.6)	14.0 (57.2)	10.8 (51.4)	4.6 (40.3)	0.6 (33.1)	8.7 (47.7)
Daily mean °C (°F)	−4.6 (23.7)	−4.4 (24.1)	−1.3 (29.7)	2.2 (36.0)	7.0 (44.6)	10.8 (51.4)	12.5 (54.5)	12.3 (54.1)	8.8 (47.8)	5.8 (42.4)	0.3 (32.5)	−3.4 (25.9)	3.8 (38.8)
Mean daily minimum °C (°F)	−8.9 (16.0)	−9.1 (15.6)	−6.0 (21.2)	−2.0 (28.4)	2.2 (36.0)	5.3 (41.5)	6.5 (43.7)	6.6 (43.9)	3.5 (38.3)	0.7 (33.3)	−4.0 (24.8)	−7.5 (18.5)	−1.1 (30.0)
Record low °C (°F)	−23.0 (−9.4)	−25.1 (−13.2)	−24.4 (−11.9)	−14.3 (6.3)	−8.8 (16.2)	−5.0 (23.0)	−0.7 (30.7)	−1.7 (28.9)	−6.7 (19.9)	−11.6 (11.1)	−18.1 (−0.6)	−25.2 (−13.4)	−25.2 (−13.4)
Average precipitation mm (inches)	81.2 (3.20)	61.5 (2.42)	72.7 (2.86)	57.1 (2.25)	90.5 (3.56)	85.2 (3.35)	82.9 (3.26)	78.2 (3.08)	62.1 (2.44)	67.5 (2.66)	80.6 (3.17)	93.4 (3.68)	912.9 (35.94)
Average precipitation days (≥ 1.0 mm)	8.5	8.5	9.0	8.8	11.9	12.1	11.3	10.6	9.1	8.8	8.9	10.3	117.7
Source: Météo-France

== Tarentaise Valley skiing ==
The Tarentaise Valley has the largest concentration of world-class ski resorts in the world. Most well known neighbour systems are Paradiski (Les Arcs, La Plagne) and Les Trois Vallées (Courchevel, Méribel, Val Thorens and more). There were once plans to interlink all systems and resorts to create what would have been by far the largest ski area in the world. However, that vision was ended with the creation of the Vanoise National Park.

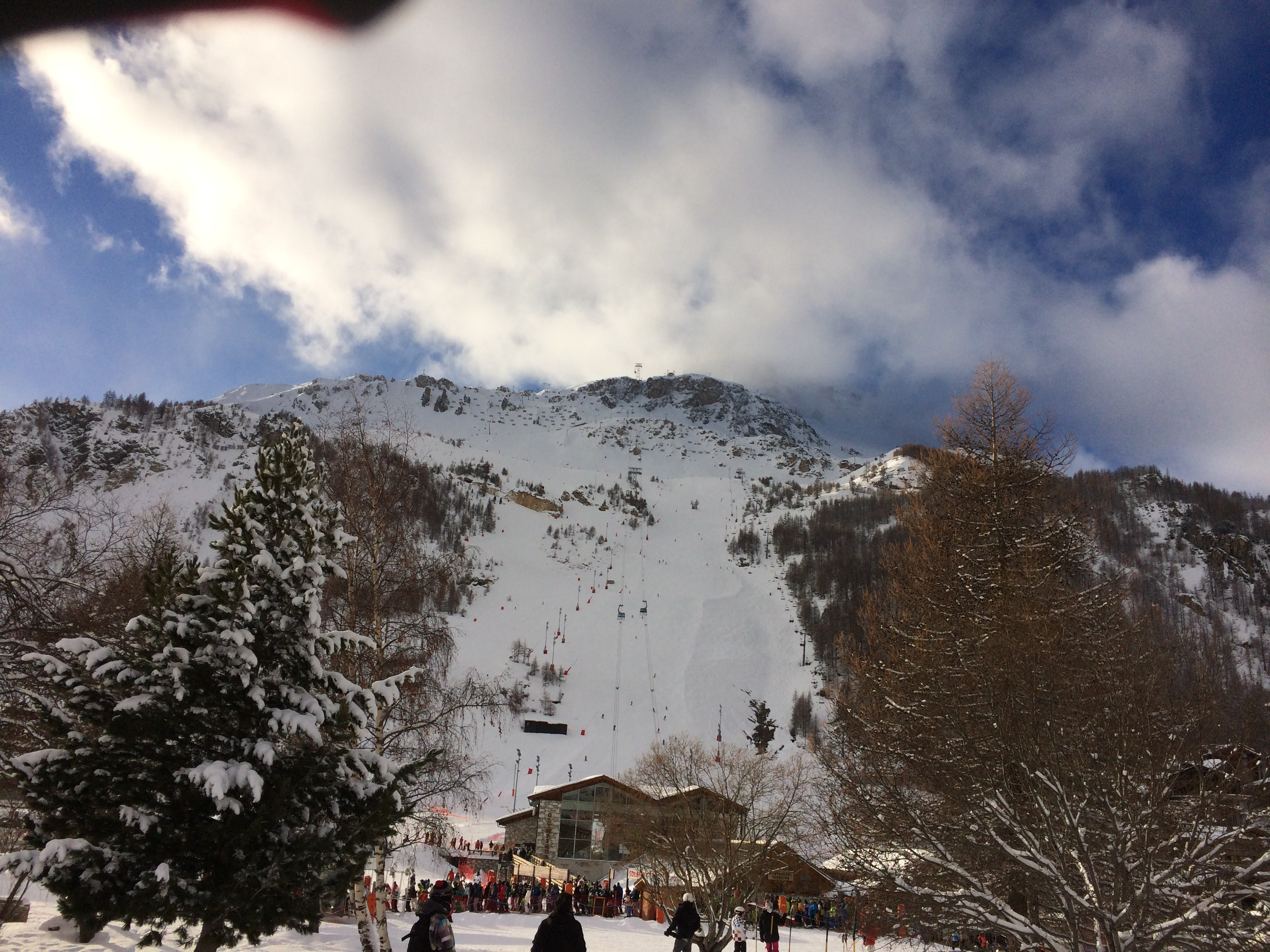
The Face de Bellevarde racing track

Location in the Alps of Europe

== Olympic Games, World Cup and World Championships ==
The resort hosts every year a round of the FIS Alpine Ski World Cup for both men and women. The men's downhill, super-G and giant slalom of the 1992 Albertville Olympic Winter Games were held on the Face de Bellevarde in Val d'Isère and it will be reused in 2030 in the French Alps. The FIS Alpine World Ski Championships 2009 were also held in Val d'Isère.

== Tour de France ==
The resort was the start of Stage 9 to Briançon in the 2007 Tour de France. The 2019 Tour de France passed through Val d'Isère on 26 July, on their way to Tignes, descending the Col de l'Iseran. Due to unexpected bad weather – a hailstorm resulting in landslides on the road along the ‘Lac du Chevril' – the organisation of the Tour had to cancel the stage passed the Col de l'Iseran. The cyclists stopped in the village of the Val d'Isère.

== GEM Altigliss Challenge ==
Val d'Isère is the location of the annual winter sporting event GEM Altigliss Challenge which is organised by Grenoble School of Management. Each February over 1000 students from 30 Grandes écoles of France participate in the week-long skiing and snowboarding event which takes place in Val d'Isère.

== Popular culture ==
When the characters Edina and Patsy in the British sitcom, Absolutely Fabulous tried to go skiing, they chose Val d'Isère.

Although the movie Les Bronzés font du ski (French Fried Vacation 2) has been a great success in France, only a few people are aware that it was shot in Val d'Isère.

In 1994, a video game named after the resort, Val d'Isere Championship was released for the Super NES, after it was featured in an episode of GamesMaster. Another game called Val d'Isère Skiing and Snowboarding was released for the Atari Jaguar in 1995.

Val d'Isère has referenced in the film adaptation of Me Before You, having been changed from Courchevel.

Val d'Isère has also appeared in the mobile skiing and snowboarding game Grand Mountain Adventure 2, as a skiable mountain with challenges and competitions.

== Notable people ==
- Henri Oreiller (1925–1962): First champion of the Winter Olympics in France (two golden medals in Sankt Moritz 1948).
- Jean-Claude Killy (born 1943), Olympic triple gold medalist, grew up in Val d'Isère.
- Christine Goitschel (born in 1944): Olympic champion Innsbruck 1964.
- Marielle Goitschel (born in 1945, sister of Christine): twice Olympic champion in 1964 and 1968

== See also ==
- Communes of the Savoie department
