= Tignes-les-Brévières =

Skiing village in the French Alps

Coordinates: 45°30′30″N 6°55′12″E

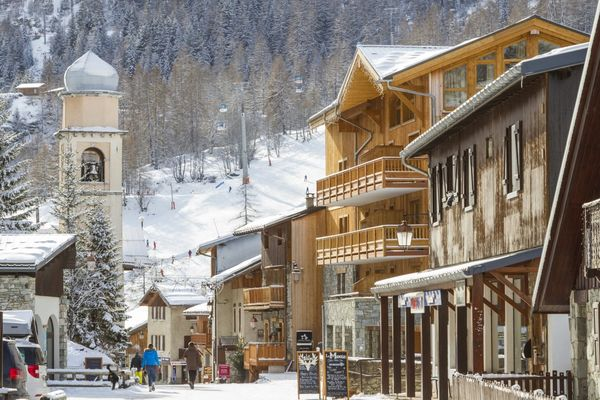
View through the centre of the old town of Tignes, with the original 16th century church on the left hand side.

Tignes-les-Brevières (French pronunciation: [tiɲ le bʁevjɛʁ]; 1550m) is a small skiing village in the French Alps that is the lowest point of the ski resort of Tignes.

Owing to its geographical location the village receives as much snowfall as its neighbours and during the 2005/6 season, Les Brevieres had over 4 metres of snow. The town is connected to other parts of Tignes after ski runs shut by a gondola and bus service.

Tignes les Brévières as viewed from the Myrtilles run

== Overview ==
Les Brévières is a traditional village and is much more picturesque than the other villages that make up the resort of Tignes. It has grown in size in recent years and now offers many more facilities whilst still retaining its charm.

The skiing area between Tignes and Val d'Isère is marketed as L'Espace Killy, after the 1968 (Winter) Olympic gold medalist, Jean-Claude Killy.

Tignes offers 39 ski lifts: 1 funiculaire, 1 cable car, 3 gondola lifts, 21 chairlifts, 13 drag lifts – an area of 150 km^{2} of ski runs – 80 ski trails: 6 green, 38 blue, 20 red, 16 black – a maximum vertical distance of 1900 metres from the Grande Motte (3450 metres) to Les Brévières (1550 metres).

The ski season is very long in Espace Killy with the lifts opening around December 1 and closing after the May Bank Holiday around May 6–8. Skiing down to Brevieres is usually very good late season due to the extensive use of snow cannons on the runs to the village.

There is a nursery slope with a free drag lift.

Connections to the rest of the Espace Killy are fast via a gondola then a chair. It takes about 20 minutes on the lifts, followed by one piste into Tignes Le Lac. Alternative routes are available, either 3 chairs up and the same piste down, or one chair to Tignes les Boisses followed by a free bus up to Tignes. Returning to Tignes les Brevieres requires just one chair lift (Chaudannes) which takes 6 minutes from Tignes le Lac.

Village facilities include:

- 3 ski shops
- ESF ski school
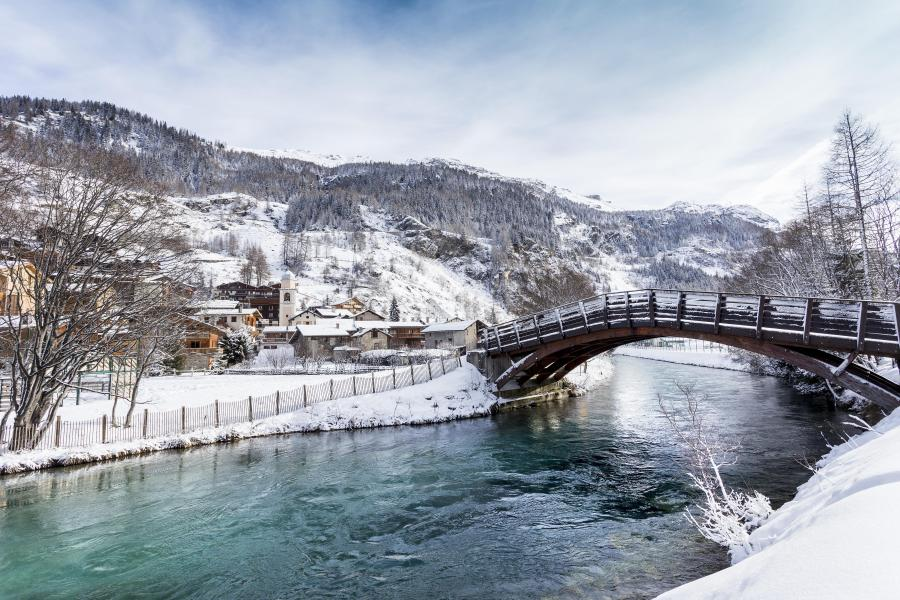
- View from the river running through the Les Brevieres with the church in the background
  small supermarket
- tabac
- cash point
- 9 bars & restaurants

Accommodation:

- in recent years new development has substantially increased the pool of chalet and apartment accommodation
