= Euro-Mediterranean Information Society =

The Euro-Mediterranean Information Society (EUMEDIS) is the principal financial instrument of the European Union for the implementation of the Euro-Mediterranean Partnership activities. EUMEDIS was initiated in the Barcelona declaration in 1995. It is a 31 billion euro program.

The support it provides for the Mediterranean countries, as a central part of the EU's role in the world, has three main objectives: strengthen political stability and democracy in a common area of peace and security, create an area of shared prosperity and to support the creation of a free trade-area between the EU and the Mediterranean Partners by 2010, and create closer ties between people of these countries through cultural, social and human partnership.
