= Grenoble School of Management =

French graduate business school

Grenoble Ecole de Management
- GEM - Grenoble Graduate School of Business
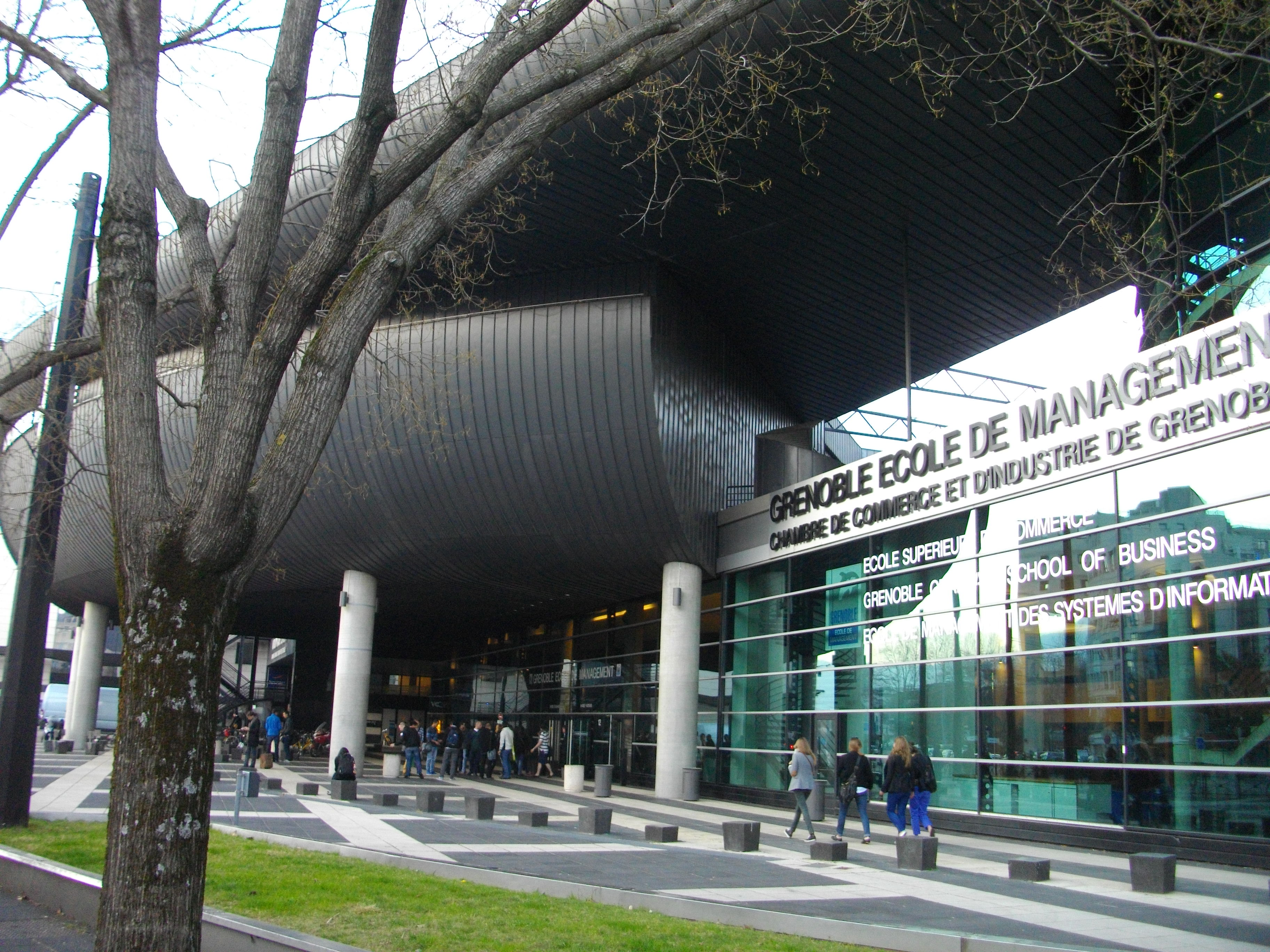
- Grenoble Ecole de management (GEM)
- Former name: Groupe École Supérieure de Commerce de Grenoble (ESC Grenoble)
- Motto: Business Lab for Society
- Type: Grande école de commerce et de management; Consular Higher Education Institution (EESC), (Private research university Business school)
- Established: 1984; 42 years ago
- Accreditation: Triple accreditation: AACSB; AMBA; EQUIS
- Affiliations: Conférence des Grandes écoles;
- Endowment: US$133,000,000 (emlyon-GEM Alliance)
- Dean: Fouziya Bouzerda
- Head: head_label
- Academic staff: 600 core and adjunct teaching staff 92% PhD.; 47% female; 54% international
- Students: 7,000; 130 nationalities
- Doctoral students: 172
- Location: Grenoble, France; 45.190°N 5.714°E
- Campus: Urban: Grenoble, Paris
- Language: English-only & French-only instruction
- Website: en.grenoble-em.com

Grenoble Ecole de Management (France)

Grenoble Ecole de Management (GEM) is a French graduate business school or Grande Ecole, founded in 1984 in Grenoble, in the Auvergne-Rhone Alpes region by the Chamber of Commerce and Industry (CCI) of Grenoble.

The school was ranked the twelfth best French business schools in 2023.

== Overview ==
=== History ===
- 1984: Foundation of Groupe ESC Grenoble, the first French Business school affiliated to Grandes écoles, to offer curricula based on technology management.
- 1988: Launch of the first specialized Master in International Marketing of New Technologies.
- 1990: 20th international exchange agreement with partner universities.
- 1993: The first French DBA (Doctor of Business Administration), AMBA accredited is developed at the school, in partnership with Henley Management College.
- 1995: The Master in International Business (MIB) is created; the management of technology becomes intercultural.
- 1997: Opening up of 3,000 square meters of space in the school dedicated to multimedia and international programs. Sup de Co Grenoble is located in the World trade center, business area at Grenoble. ESC Grenoble collaborated with engineering schools (INPG, ENSIMAG, ENST Bretagne, Mines Telecom...)
- 2000: Groupe ESC Grenoble receives EQUIS accreditation from the EFMD, placing it among the top business schools in Europe. A recruitment office is opened in Shanghai, to expose the Chinese market to the school's international programs.
- 2001: Groupe ESC Grenoble becomes a multi-site school by setting up its programs internationally: 1 in Russia, 1 in Moldova, 1 in Malta, 2 in China.
- 40% of the student bodies now comes from abroad.
- 2002: Thierry Grange (International director, honorary consul of Norway, ex-CEO) becomes dean and director general of Groupe ESC Grenoble.
- 2003: ESC Grenoble group change its name and becomes Grenoble Ecole de Management

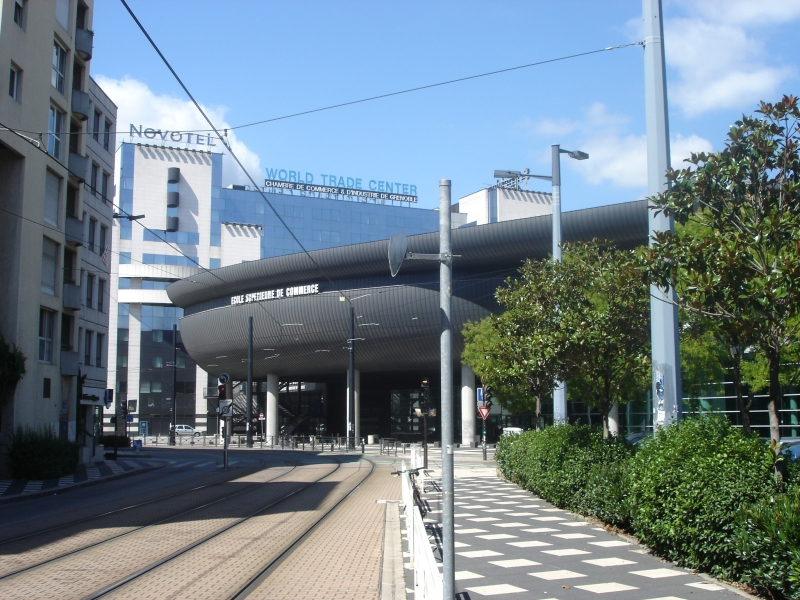
GEM campus.

- 2004: Grenoble Ecole de Management obtains AACSB accreditation, an international recognition of the school's quality, and is awarded AMBA accreditation for its MBA program. GEM is triple accredited with AMBA-EQUIS-AACSB.
- 2004-05: The school's Master in International Business program receives PEMM accreditation from AMBA and is ranked eighth in the Financial Times ranking of European Masters in Management.
- 2007: Geopolitics becomes compulsory both in the ESC Grenoble entry exam and in the core curriculum ("Grande Ecole program").
- 2008: Grenoble Ecole de Management is a founding member of the Innovation Campus GIANT alongside the ESRF, ILL, EMBL, CNRS, CEA, Grenoble INP and the UJF.
- 2009: The school jumps 11 places in the annual Financial Times European business schools ranking, having been ranked in the top 20 best schools in Europe.
- 2010: Grenoble Ecole de Management partners with Harvard Business School.
- 2012: Former Associate Director, Vice-Dean in charge of Academics, Research and Faculty, Senior Professor, Management and Behaviour, Loïck Roche becomes Grenoble Ecole de Management's third director.
- 2013: Grenoble Ecole de Management opens a new campus in Paris to promote its international and executive education programs.
- 2016: On 14 March, during an interview with "Le Monde", Lise Dumasy, president of the University of Grenoble-Alpes (UGA), declared that Grenoble-Alpes University and Grenoble School of Management (GEM) will deliver double degrees in Engineering, law, politics, philosophy and economics fields.
- 2016: The school partners with Hannover-based GISMA Business School to open a new campus in Berlin.

In March 2016, Grenoble Ecole de Management (GEM) and EMLYON Business School announced their alliance, the Alliance Lyon Grenoble Business School.

- 2017: Grenoble Ecole de Management is consistently ranked among "the 5 best universities and business schools in France" according to Le Figaro, Financial Times for MS in management and by The Economist 2018 and QS World University 2018 for global MBA.
- 2019: Grenoble has a network of more than 40,500 alumni in the world with representatives at London, Dubai, Berlin, Hong Kong, San Francisco.

== Programs ==
The Grenoble Ecole de Management (GEM) offers an academic program with: the Master in Management (Grande Ecole) taught in the most selective French business schools "écoles supérieures de commerce"; the Bachelor of International Business (BIB) ranked first in France (Le Parisien) and various undergraduate certificates and graduates including : the MBA, EMBA, MIB, and the 13+ Master's level programs MSc. All are delivered in English or French.

The PhD program was launched in 2009, with four majors : marketing, finance, strategy and innovation management, and organisational sciences.

== Rankings ==
Business school rankings

Europe
- QS MBA: 29

Global
- QS MBA: 96
- Financial Times MBA: 96

GEM is ranked 7th in the world in the 2024 Financial Times Masters in Finance Ranking.

GEM is rated by the Financial Times, The Economist, Shanghai ranking and QS World University rankings as one of the top business schools in continental Europe ("Business administration", "Management", "Economics") and one of the leading business schools worldwide.

The school has been ranked second after HEC for sustainable & ecology development by Le Figaro, FT and Davos's Forum. Grenoble École de Management was recognized as one of the observers of COP26.

== Partnerships ==
There are many international exchanges of staff and students including a longstanding partnership with Trinity College Dublin, and Dublin Institute of Technology, Ireland and with other partners on five continents.

GEM collaborates each year in "Serious Games" with the MIT Sloan School of Management, US. and with MIT GSW for Startup conferences.

GEM hosts the student association Altigliss which organizes the World cup Ski and Snowboard competition for students in the Alps.

== Research ==
Grenoble Ecole de Management as of 2016 had over 90 scholars active in research.

Grenoble Ecole de Management conducts research in the following themes:

- Business & Finances
- Economy, society, and organizations
- Marketing
- Technology management
- Strategy, innovation, and entrepreneurship

GEM hosts a number of academic and applied research centers, and is part of various national and international research initiatives such as: MEDFORIST, GIANT (CNRS), and the European Institute of Innovation and Technology.

== Student life ==
GEM Alumni is the association of former students (45,000+) and is represented in several countries (London, Dubai, Hong Kong, San Francisco ...) with local branches, and holds meetings.

The student association GEM Altigliss Challenge organizes (21st edition) each year the student world cup of skiing and snowboarding in Alpine mountains.

The school's location (HQ) is multicultural with 130 nationalities represented. Since 2009 GEM has hosted the annual "Grenoble Geopolitics Festival" to illustrate geopolitical impacts and alliances on economics and financial markets.

As of 2022 GEM had around 7,200 students and 600 teaching staff.
