= Tignes =

- Commune
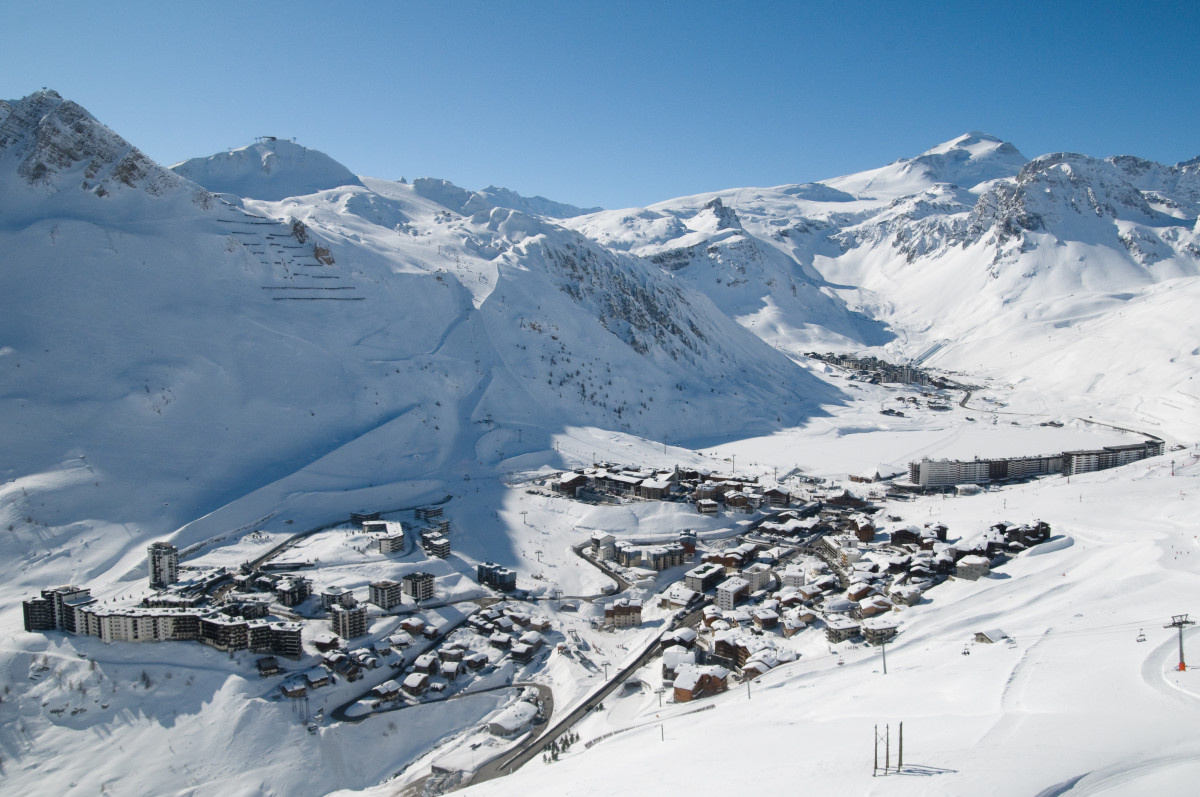
- Tignes Le Lac taken from the Aiguille Pierce mountain, with views of Val Claret in the background

- Coat of arms
- Location of Tignes
- Location within France Location within Auvergne-Rhône-Alpes
- Coordinates: 45°28′06″N 6°54′20″E
- Country: France
- Region: Auvergne-Rhône-Alpes
- Department: Savoie
- Arrondissement: Albertville
- Canton: Bourg-Saint-Maurice

Government
  - Mayor (2020–2026): Serge Revial
- Area^{1}: 81.63 km^{2} (31.52 sq mi)
- Elevation: 1,810 m (5,940 ft)
- Highest elevation: 3,747 m (12,293 ft)
- Lowest elevation: 1,440 m (4,720 ft)
- Population (2023): 1,919
  - Density: 23.51/km^{2} (60.89/sq mi)
- Time zone: UTC+01:00 (CET)
  - Summer (DST): UTC+02:00 (CEST)
- INSEE/Postal code: 73296 /73320
- Website: https://en.tignes.net
- ^{1} French Land Register data, which excludes lakes, ponds, glaciers > 1 km^{2} (0.386 sq mi or 247 acres) and river estuaries.

Tignes (French pronunciation: [tiɲ]) is a commune in the Tarentaise Valley, in the Savoie department in the Rhône-Alpes region in south-eastern France, known for the highest skiable area and the longest ski season in Europe. It is located in the Savoie region with good transport links in and out of Lyon, Geneva and Chambéry.

It is widely known as a snow sure ski resort, with neighbouring Val d'Isère it forms the Tignes – Val d'Isère ski area. The proximity of two resorts has a continuous link between the ski areas, and as a result a single ski-able area of 300 km piste.

Tignes was the freestyle skiing venue for the 1992 Winter Olympics, co-host city for the 1992 Winter Paralympics and host of the Winter X Games. This, coupled with the year round skiing, season length and large number of ski parks/slalom runs has cemented Tignes as the go to training ground for snow sport athletes.

The terrain of the valley lends itself to more challenging skiing, with advanced skiers often opting for the resort as their preferred ski area. The town has however strived to improve its appeal to beginner and intermediate skiers with the introduction of easier runs lower down in the valley towards Tignes-Les-Brévières and upgrading existing chairlifts and installing new ones with smaller elevation gains.

== Geography ==
=== Natural Stadium ===
The main villages of Tignes sit within a base of a high altitude valley with the Grande Motte at the furthest point and an array of other peaks wrapping around the valley. The other end is open, and drops away to the Lac du Chevril. This geography is described as having the feeling of being in a large open stadium, and Tignards (locals) often refer to the area as the "Stade Naturel", or Natural Stadium in English.

=== Villages ===
Tignes comprises 5 Villages; Tignes Val Claret, Tignes le Lac, Le Lavachet, Tignes Les Boisses and Tignes-les-Brévières. The first three are close together at 2100 m with Les Boisses and Les Brevieres further down the valley, above and below the dam respectively. All the towns located above the dam are linked by a free continuous shuttle bus. The only village located below these villages, Tignes Les Brévières, is accessible to the others via a free gondola service which operates late into the evening. Les Brévières remains the only remaining part of the original town, with all the others created as part of the dam construction or development of the ski resort. All the villages are part of the ski resort known as Tignes.

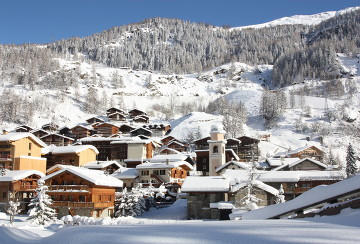
View onto the old town of Tignes located at 1550m

=== Dam (barrage de Tignes) ===
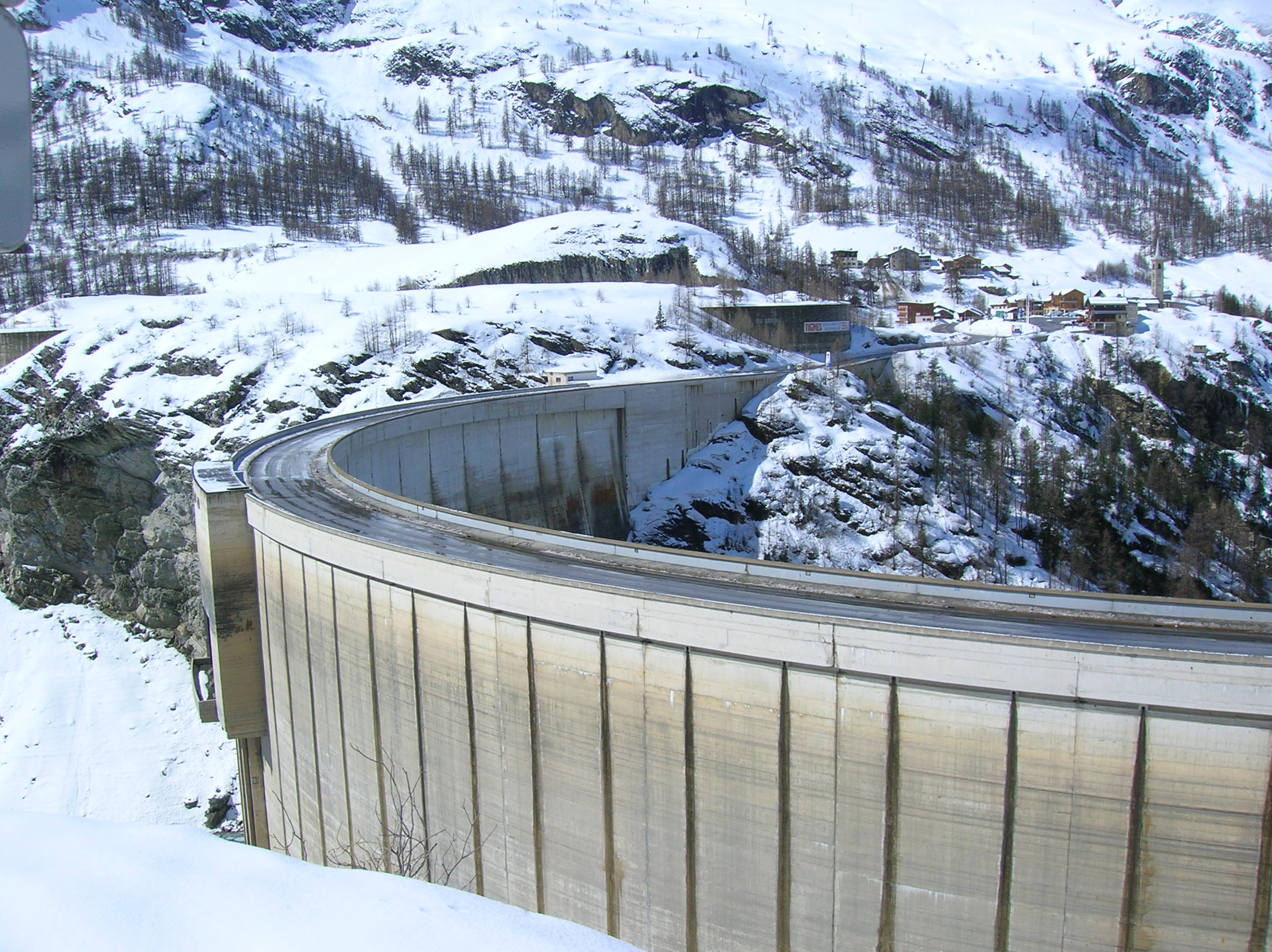
Barrage de Tignes.

The original village of Tignes (at 1700m) was in the Isère valley below Val d'Isère. After the second world war, France needed electricity and it was decided to build the hydro-electric Tignes Dam in the Isère valley. Whilst this was a great achievement for French engineering and was for the greater good of France, it meant that the old village of Tignes was drowned. The dam was completed and the village was submerged in 1952. A replica of the original church was created in Tignes les Boisses. Once every 10 years the lake behind the dam (Lac du Chevril) is drained for maintenance work and the remains of the old village becomes visible.

The dam was painted with a fresco of Hercules in 1989 by Jean-Marie Pierret with the help of eight mountain climbers; it was funded by private corporations interested in boosting the Olympic appeal during the winter games of 1992 which took place in nearby Albertville.

=== Climate ===
Tignes has a subarctic climate (Köppen climate classification Dfc). The average annual temperature in Tignes is 2.8 °C (37.0 °F). The average annual rainfall is 1,036.6 mm (40.81 in) with August as the wettest month. The temperatures are highest on average in July, at around 11.6 °C (52.9 °F), and lowest in January, at around −5.3 °C (22.5 °F). The highest temperature ever recorded in Tignes was 29.9 °C (85.8 °F) on 23 July 2019; the coldest temperature ever recorded was −27.8 °C (−18.0 °F) on 27 February 2018.

Climate data for Tignes (1991−2020 normals, extremes 1992−present)
Month	Jan	Feb	Mar	Apr	May	Jun	Jul	Aug	Sep	Oct	Nov	Dec	Year
Record high °C (°F)	10.6 (51.1)	12.0 (53.6)	13.9 (57.0)	14.3 (57.7)	20.6 (69.1)	27.0 (80.6)	29.9 (85.8)	26.5 (79.7)	22.4 (72.3)	20.4 (68.7)	15.9 (60.6)	9.0 (48.2)	29.9 (85.8)
Mean daily maximum °C (°F)	−1.2 (29.8)	−0.3 (31.5)	3.0 (37.4)	5.4 (41.7)	9.4 (48.9)	14.1 (57.4)	16.4 (61.5)	16.3 (61.3)	12.3 (54.1)	9.0 (48.2)	2.9 (37.2)	−0.3 (31.5)	7.3 (45.1)
Daily mean °C (°F)	−5.3 (22.5)	−5.1 (22.8)	−2.0 (28.4)	1.0 (33.8)	5.2 (41.4)	9.5 (49.1)	11.5 (52.7)	11.5 (52.7)	7.9 (46.2)	4.7 (40.5)	−0.8 (30.6)	−4.2 (24.4)	2.8 (37.0)
Mean daily minimum °C (°F)	−9.3 (15.3)	−9.9 (14.2)	−7.0 (19.4)	−3.5 (25.7)	1.1 (34.0)	4.9 (40.8)	6.6 (43.9)	6.7 (44.1)	3.4 (38.1)	0.5 (32.9)	−4.6 (23.7)	−8.2 (17.2)	−1.6 (29.1)
Record low °C (°F)	−24.3 (−11.7)	−27.8 (−18.0)	−22.5 (−8.5)	−15.9 (3.4)	−11.4 (11.5)	−7.1 (19.2)	−1.7 (28.9)	−2.8 (27.0)	−7.6 (18.3)	−13.4 (7.9)	−19.0 (−2.2)	−22.7 (−8.9)	−27.8 (−18.0)
Average precipitation mm (inches)	92.0 (3.62)	65.3 (2.57)	73.6 (2.90)	61.4 (2.42)	104.3 (4.11)	102.4 (4.03)	100.3 (3.95)	105.0 (4.13)	72.4 (2.85)	85.3 (3.36)	76.7 (3.02)	97.9 (3.85)	1,036.6 (40.81)
Average precipitation days (≥ 1.0 mm)	9.6	7.9	9.7	10.0	13.7	12.5	11.6	11.8	9.6	9.8	9.9	10.8	126.8
Source: Météo-France

== Population ==
Historical population
Year	Pop.	±% p.a.
1968	901	—
1975	1,412	+6.63%
1982	1,486	+0.73%
1990	2,005	+3.82%
1999	2,220	+1.14%
2007	2,169	−0.29%
2012	2,494	+2.83%
2017	2,196	−2.51%
2023	1,919	−2.22%
Source: INSEE

== Ski resort ==
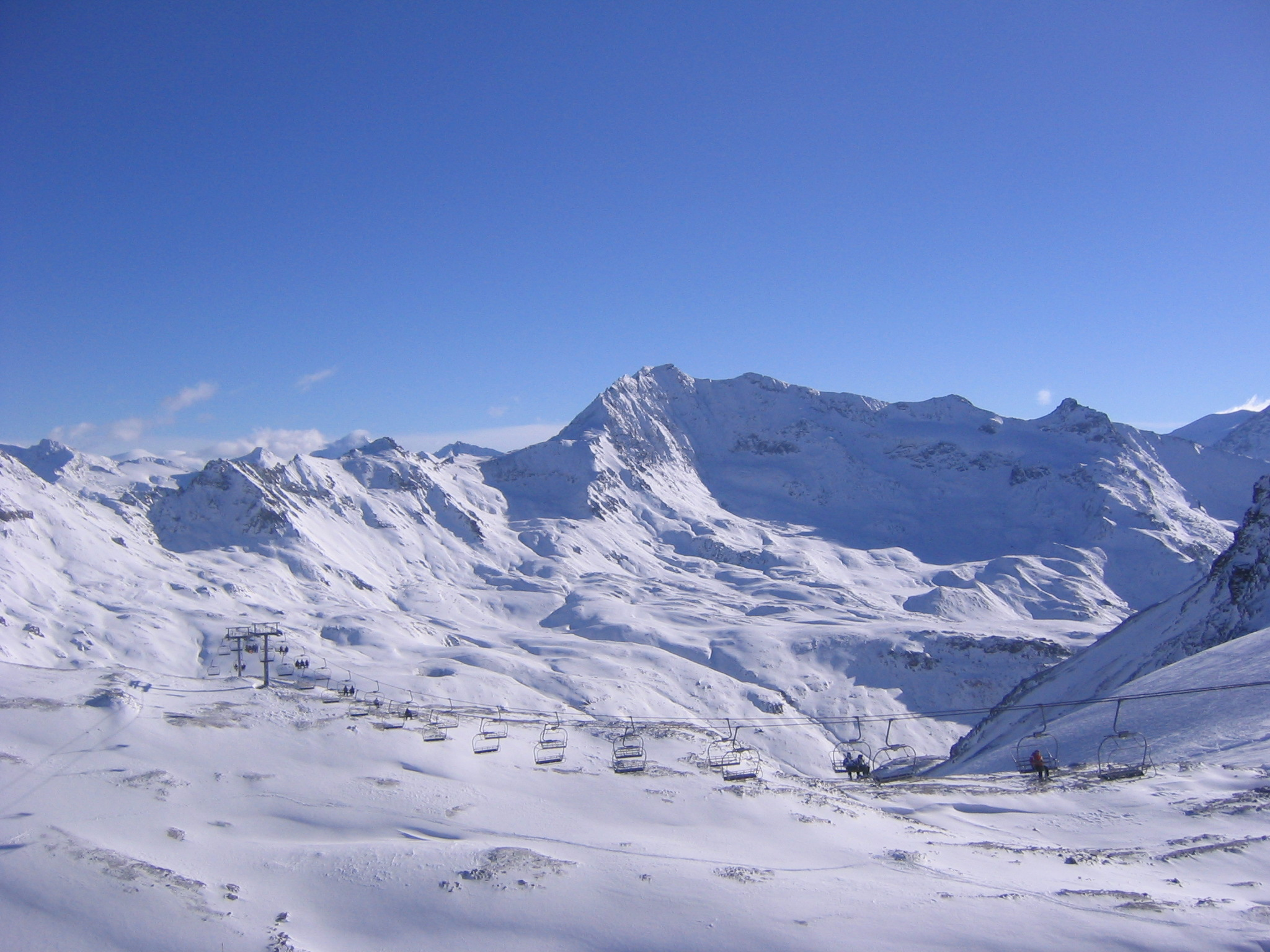
A ski lift on the Grande Motte.

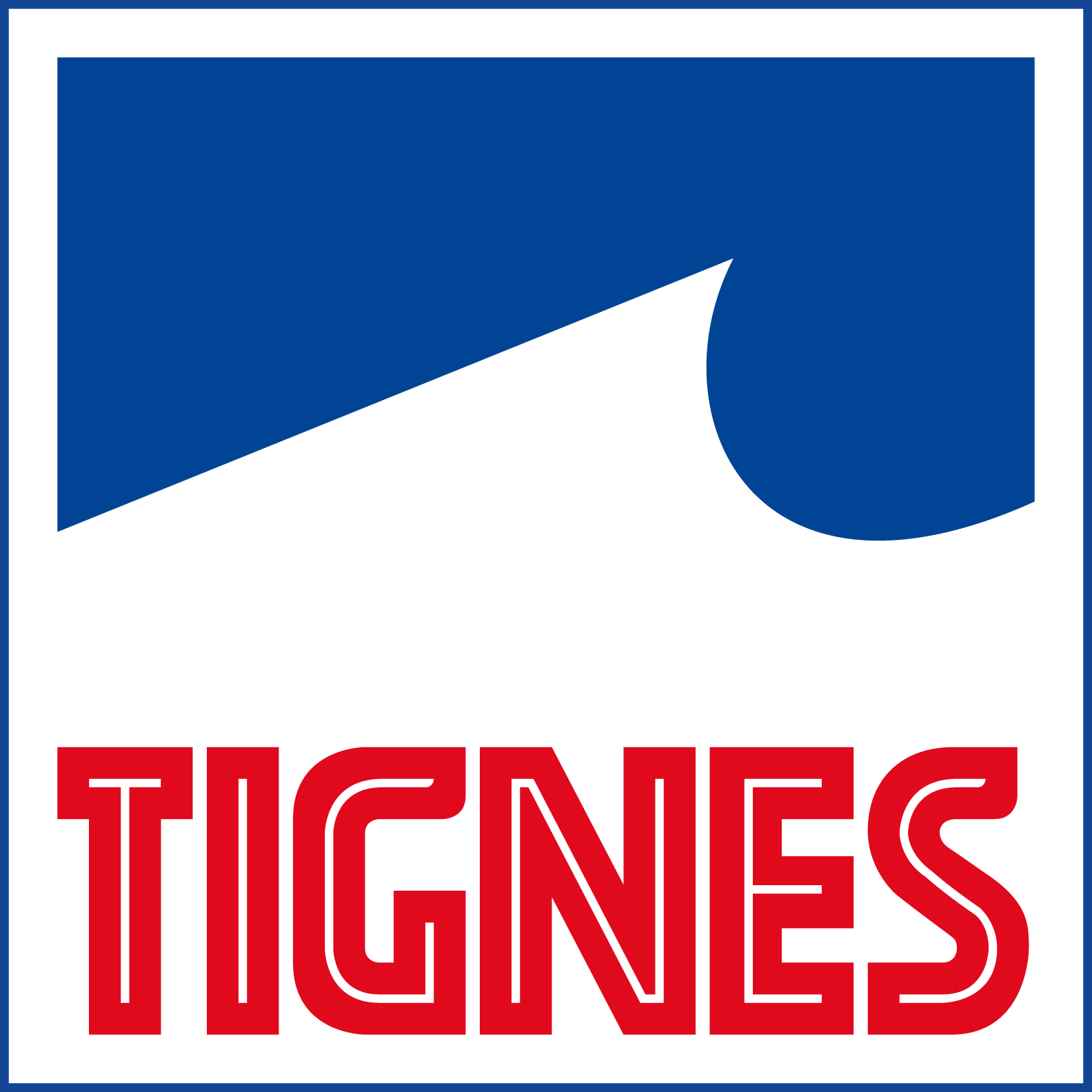
Logo used to identify the ski resort

After the loss of the old village it was decided to develop a ski resort at the higher lake (Le Lac). This was surrounded by a bowl that is ideal for skiing and is headed by the Grand Motte glacier. The resort was developed largely during the 1960s and the building style reflects what was regarded as good building design at that time. In recent years the town has worked to improve the look of the new villages with some success.

The lifts of Tignes have been managed since 1967 by the company STGM (The Société des Téléphériques de la Grande Motte). Many lifts are fast 6 or 8 person chairlifts and there are 113 snow cannons which produce 450,000 m^{2} of artificial snow each year. The ski area is linked through easy access with the adjacent resort of Val-d'Isère, combining to form the Tignes-Val d'Isere ski area (formerly known as Espace Killy). At 4.2 km, Tignes boasts the 4th longest funicular in the world. Ski trails in Tignes reach a height of 3456 m, aiding its reputation as one of the best resorts in the Alps for snow sureness.

The resort has also become the home for Apex 2100, an international ski academy aiming to become the world's leading academy for young skiers. The academy is headed by former English rugby union player and coach, Sir Clive Woodward.

=== Operations ===
There are 56 ski patrollers covering the resort of Tignes. 15 snow cats maintain the quality of the pistes. Four of these are equipped with winches for working steep slopes and one is adapted for shaping the half pipe. Around 60 percent of the slopes are groomed each evening.

=== Grande Motte glacier ===
Owing to the presence of the Grande Motte glacier, Tignes used to offer year round skiing but, as the glacier has receded in recent years, this has now ceased. However skiing on the glacier is still possible during some of the summer months and in autumn, as well as during the winter season (end of November to beginning of May). The Grande Motte cable car has recently been upgraded to increase access to the top of the glacier.

=== Environment ===
Tignes and Val-D'isere were the first resorts to be internationally recognised for their commitment to providing an environmentally friendly skiing area by gaining a GreenGlobe certificate. The award was given for the town's high-quality public transport connectivity and integration, as well as its total use of renewable electricity.

== Tarentaise Valley skiing ==
The Tarentaise Valley is the biggest concentration of world-class ski resorts in the world. The well-known neighbour systems are Paradiski (Les Arcs and La Plagne) and Les Trois Vallées (Courchevel, Meribel, Val Thorens and more). There were once plans to interlink all systems and resorts to create the largest ski area in the world. However, that vision was ended with the creation of the Vanoise National Park.

== 2017 avalanche ==
On 13 February 2017, four people died in an avalanche in the ski resort. It was reported to be at least 400 metres (1,300 ft) wide and at an altitude of 2,100 metres. The members were being led by an ESF instructor but were skiing on a notoriously avalanche prone area, on a day when the avalanche risk in the resort was high.

== Summer ==
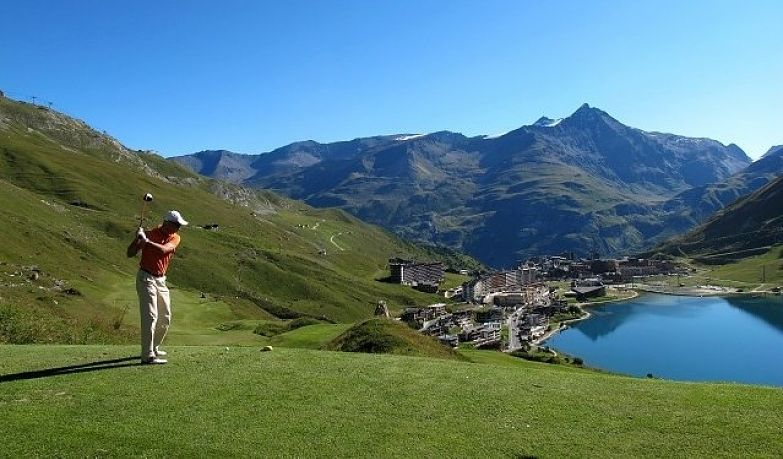
View from the 7th hole of the golf course with Tignes Le Lac in the background

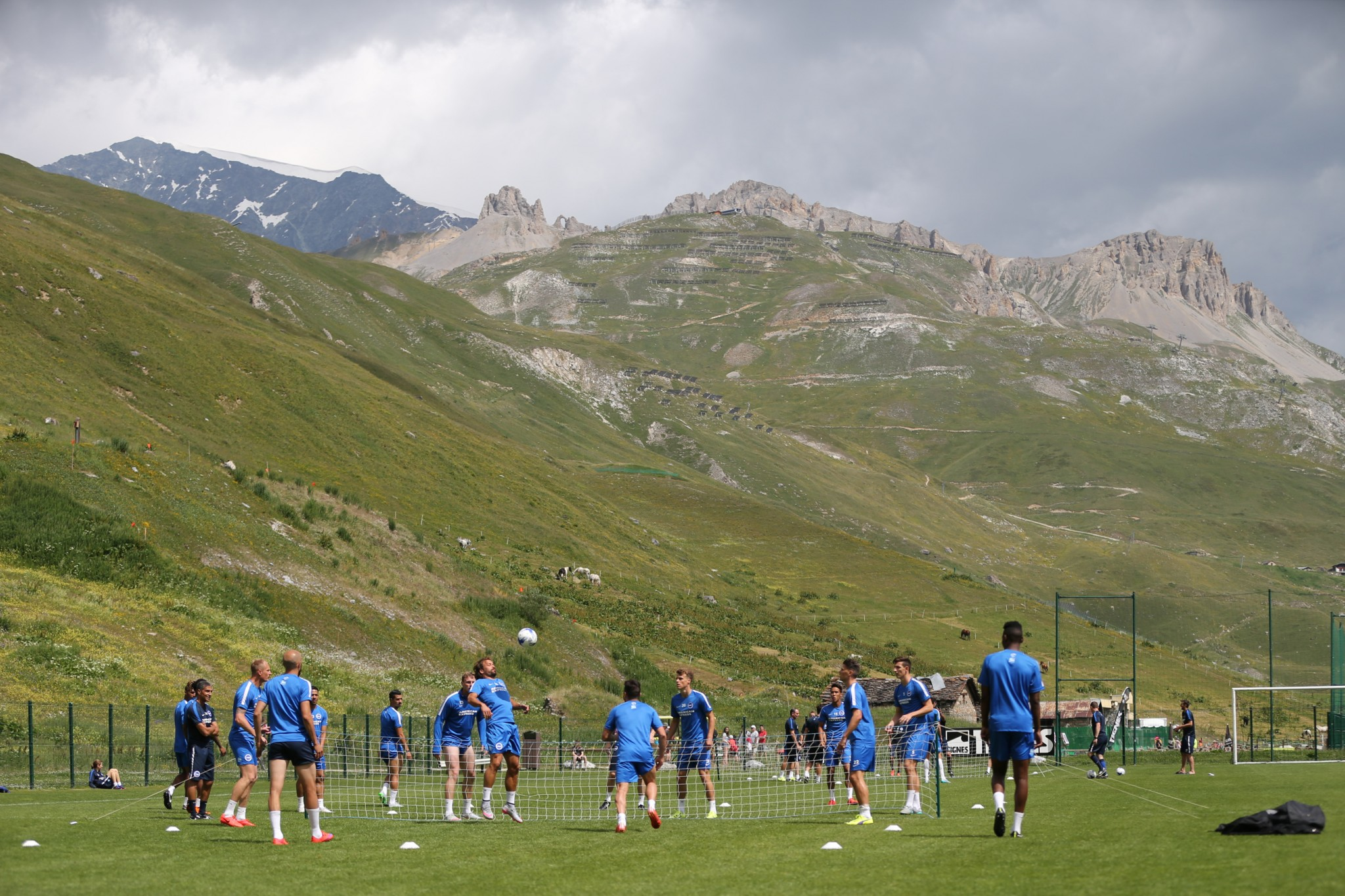
Brighton Football team training on one of the high-altitude football pitches

Tignes is well known for its year round amenities. In the summer Tignes shifts towards a multi activity resort with particular focus as an altitude training base for athletes. Many come to the resort to utilise the facilities it offers for altitude training with notable sports people such as the French national rugby union team making use of the facilities. France's national football team famously trained here prior to their 1998 World Cup win. More recently a string of football teams from the UK have used the location for pre-season training, including premier league team, Brighton & Hove Albion.

However, Tignes still maintains its appeal as a ski resort by offering skiers the ability to ski on the Grande Motte glacier from the end of June to the beginning of August.

Tignes has the second highest golf course in Europe. Designed by the golf architect Philippe Valant, the course features a full 18 hole course running along a 5 km stretch of the mountainside.

== Tour de France ==
Tignes was first used as a summit finish for Stage 8 of the 2007 Tour de France. Tignes was scheduled to be the summit finish for stage 19 of the 2019 Tour de France. Due to a snowstorm and mudslide, the road to Tignes was impassable and so the stage was ended at Col de l'Iseran instead. Tignes was the summit finish for stage 9 of the 2021 Tour de France, as well as the location for the first rest day of the Tour. The stage was won by Australian Ben O'Connor.

== See also ==
- Tignes-les-Brévières
- Tignes Val Claret
- List of ski areas and resorts in Europe
- Communes of the Savoie department
