= Tignes – Val d'Isère =

Ski resort in Val d'Isère and Tignes, France

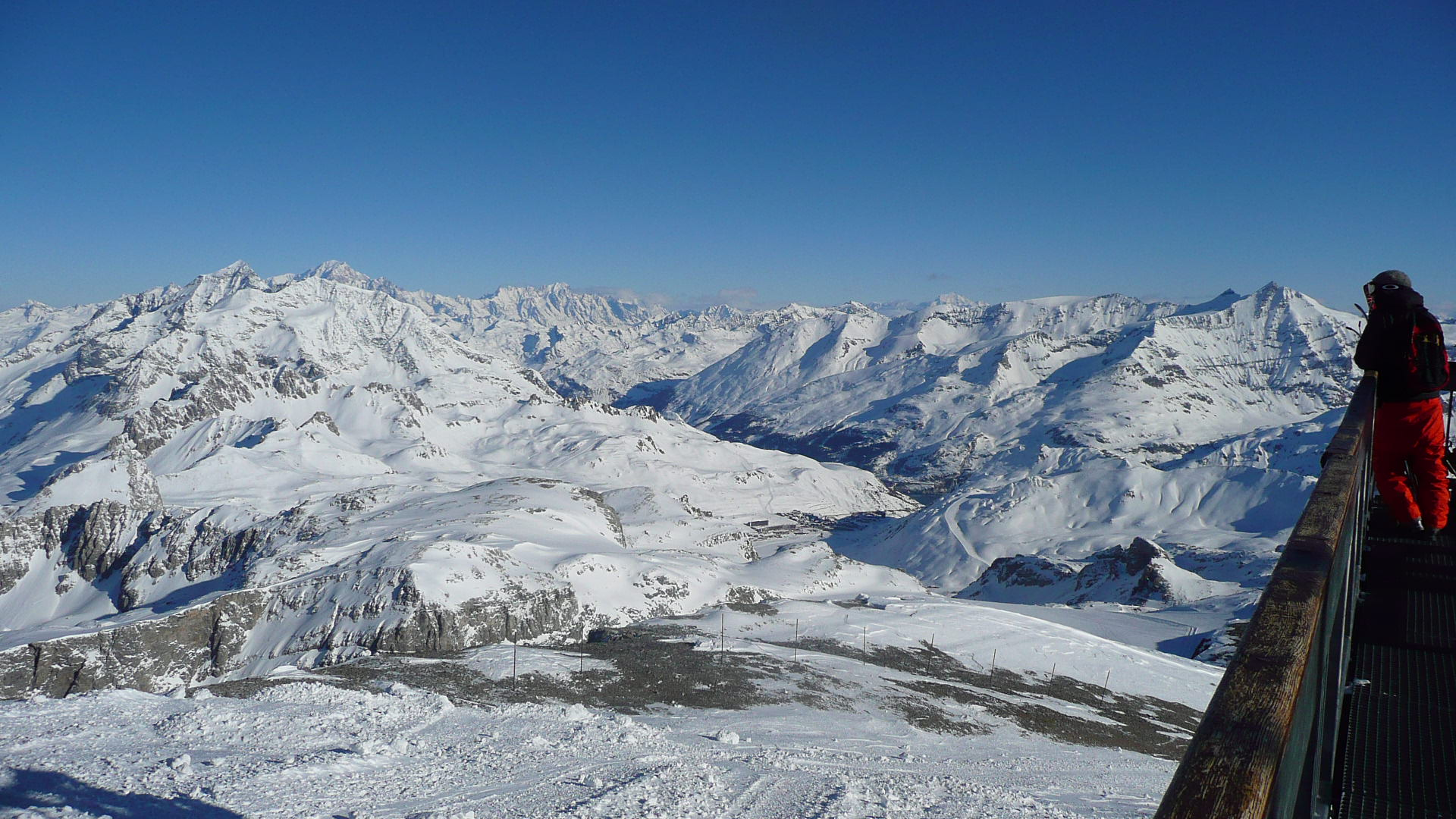
- Interactive map of Tignes – Val d'Isère
- Location: Val d'Isère & Tignes, France
- Coordinates: 45°37′10″N 6°45′15″E
- Owner: Compagnie des Alpes
- Top elevation: 3456 m
- Base elevation: 1550 m
- Skiable area: 300 km of runs
- Trails: 156 total 23 (15%) beginner 66 (42%) easy 40 (26%) intermediate 27 (17%) difficult
- Longest run: 10 km (6.2 mi)
- Lift system: 90 (2 funicular, 4 cable cars, 4 gondolas, 44 chair lifts, 36 surface lifts)
- Terrain parks: 2
- Snowmaking: 216 cannons
- Website: http://www.espacekilly.com/

Tignes – Val d'Isère is the combined ski resort area of Val d'Isère and Tignes in the Tarentaise Valley, Savoie in the French Alps. It is sometimes known as Espace Killy, in honour of the spectacularly successful skier Jean-Claude Killy who was raised there.

There are claimed to be 300 km of pistes:

- 22 green runs, 61 blues, 46 reds and 25 blacks, plus 44 km of cross country skiing
- 2 terrain parks
- 2 glaciers
- 90 ski lifts
