= Stratton Mountain Resort =

Ski area in Vermont, United States

Stratton Mountain

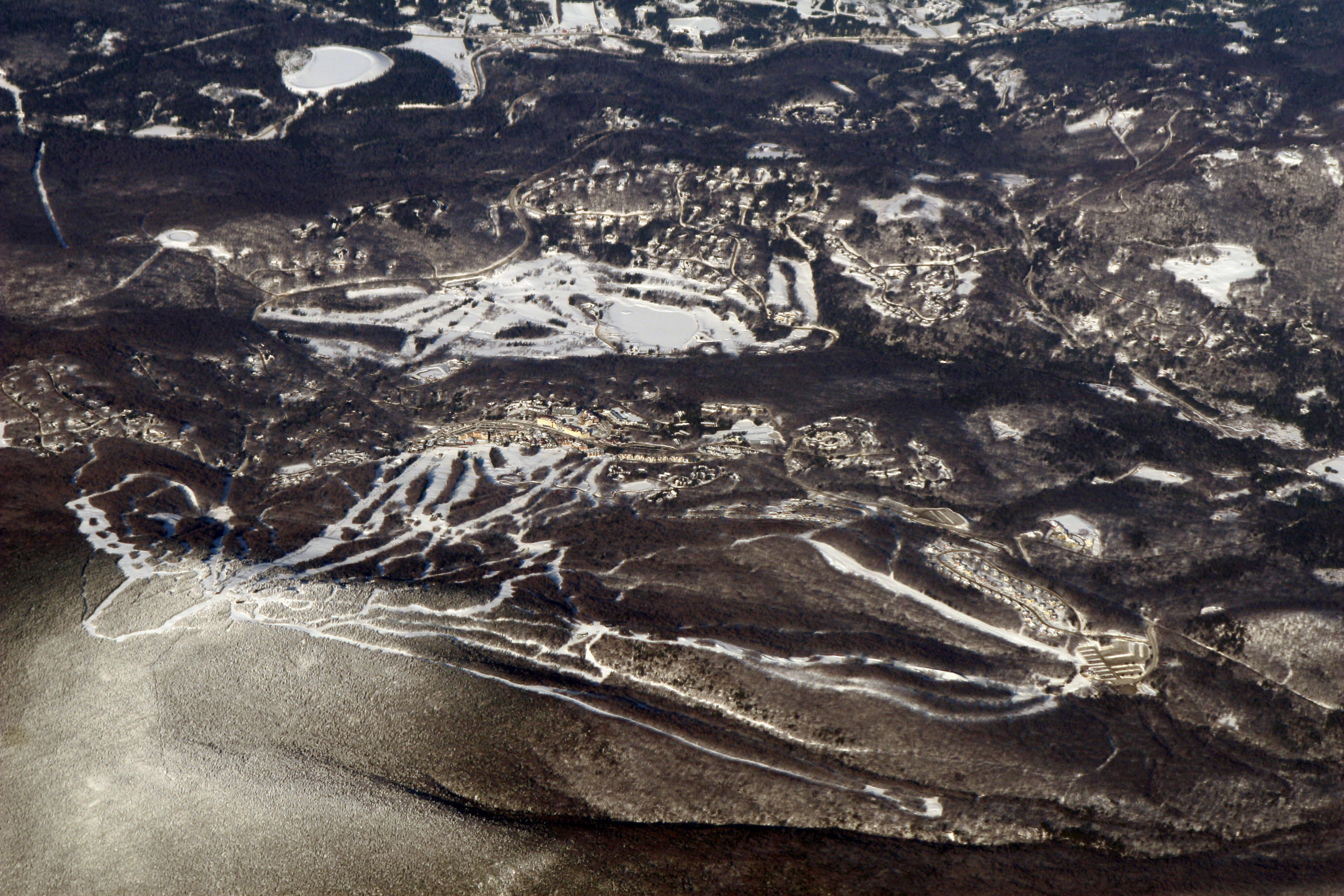
- Aerial view of Stratton Mountain Resort

- Location in Vermont Stratton Mountain (the United States)
- Location: Stratton Mountain, Windham County, Vermont, United States
- Nearest city: Winhall
- Coordinates: 43°06′51″N 72°54′24″W
- Status: Operating
- Owner: Alterra Mountain Company
- Vertical: 2,003 ft (611 m)
- Top elevation: 3,875 ft (1,181 m)
- Base elevation: 1,872 ft (571 m)
- Skiable area: 625 acres (2.53 km^{2})
- Trails: 99
- Longest run: Easy Street 3.0 miles (4.8 km)
- Lift system: 13 total 1 high speed gondola, 4 high-speed six-pack chairs, 1 high-speed quad chair, 2 fixed-grip quad chairs, 1 fixed-grip triple chair, 1 fixed-grip double chair, 5 carpets
- Snowfall: 180 inches (15 ft; 4.6 m)
- Snowmaking: 95%
- Night skiing: no
- Website: Stratton.com

Stratton Mountain Resort is a ski area in the northeastern United States, located on Stratton Mountain in Stratton, Vermont, east of Manchester.

== History ==
Stratton was established in December 1961 with three double chairlifts and a three-story base lodge. Although the mountain was top notch, the access road was a disaster; it was paved in 1962, prior to the second season, and two T-bar lifts were added in 1963 for the third season. A big expansion took place for the 1964–65 season when the Snow Bowl was opened, bringing a double chairlift and over thirty acres (12 ha) of terrain. Another double chairlift was opened and the base lodge was expanded for the 1966–67 season, giving way to the birth of European style après-ski entertainment by the Innsbruck Trio, a group of Austrian ski instructors. The group became known as the Stratton Mountain Boys and a key marketing component of the mountain.

In the early 1970s, following development of the initial terrain, Stratton began to develop a new beginner area; this opened in 1972 with additional trails, though plans for a new lift were not realized. In the late 1980s, Stratton constructed new terrain to the south of the main mountain, and dubbed it "Kidderbrook." The expansion included a new quad chairlift, and was planned to be a starting point for potential additional terrain and housing in the area, though this never occurred.

In the late 1990s and early 2000s, the ski area constructed several new high-speed six-person lifts, and in 2007, the Kidderbrook Quad was removed and sold, as it was underused and Stratton's parent companies were in financial trouble at the time. From 1985 to 2012, Stratton hosted the Burton U.S. Open Snowboarding Championships; the premier open snowboarding event in the country. After a 27-year run at Stratton, the event moved in 2013 to Vail in Colorado.

=== Early years ===
Lift served skiing debuted on the northern peak of the mountain when Stratton Mountain ski area opened with 3 double chairlifts (installed using a then-unique helicopter method) in December 1961. Designed by Gene Gillis of Sel Hannah's Sno Engineering firm, the area also sported a three-story base lodge.

While the facilities were top notch, the muddy access road was called a 'tank-proving ground' by the press. The road received much needed pavement in time for the area's second season. Stratton's uphill capacity was improved for its third season with the installation of two T-Bars. A sizable expansion took place the following season, when 30 acres (12 ha) of terrain, served by a new double chairlift, were opened in the new Snow Bowl. 1966–67 saw an expansion of the base lodge giving way to the regions first Apre' Ski parties and the birth of The Stratton Mountain Boys and the installation of another double chairlift. The Grizzly Bear and Polar Bear trails were added for the following season.

The Sun Bowl was developed for the 1968–69 season, adding a new base area, five miles (8 km) of trails, and a new double chairlift. An additional two chairlift expansion was planned for the 1971–72 season, however Stratton became one of the first ski areas in the state to run into trouble with the new Act 250 law, when residents of Winhall forced the ski area to first overhaul its sewer system in advance of potential increases in skier visits. The Main Line pod was partially developed in the early 1970s, however development was halted prior to the installation of a chairlift. Snowmaking was expanded to the summit, circa 1974.

Also in 1974, James Sunday was paralyzed after a fall while skiing at Stratton. In a landmark decision three years later, Sunday was awarded $1.5 million by a jury. The decision resulted in significant price increases throughout the ski industry, due to skyrocketing liability insurance costs.

In 1978, Stratton hosted the World Cup tour, with technical events (giant slalom, slalom) for both men and women in early March. On the men's side, twenty-year-old American Phil Mahre won the GS and twin brother Steve took the slalom, as Ingemar Stenmark was shut out but made both podiums. Hanni Wenzel won the women's giant slalom and Perrine Pelen took the slalom; Cindy Nelson was the top women's finisher from the U.S., sixth in GS and fifth in slalom.

=== Moore and Munger, Inc. ownership ===
Late in 1979, Stratton purchased nearby Bromley and assumed its multimillion-dollar debt. Stratton's debt was now reportedly up to $7 million. Moore and Munger, Inc. came to the rescue and purchased Stratton in early 1980. During the 1980s, Jake Burton found an ally in Stratton, when it became the first ski area to allow snowboarding. In addition to this, Stratton also became home to the first snowboard school, and started hosting US Open snowboard races in 1985. Stratton later became home to the first half pipe and formal terrain park on the east coast.

In the mid-1980s, in conjunction with the expansion of Stratton Village, the lift network at Stratton was modernized. Four new Poma chairlifts were installed in 1985 and 1986, replacing aging Heron-Pomas. The Mid Mountain lodge was constructed in 1985 as well.

In the fall of 1987, Moore and Munger, Inc. sold Bromley to the owners of nearby Magic Mountain. The following year, the famous gondola was installed to the summit of Stratton.

=== Victoria USA, Inc. ownership ===
In the spring of 1989, Victoria USA, Inc., a Japanese sporting goods company that owned Breckenridge, purchased Stratton. Later that year, the Kidderbrook area debuted along with the construction of the Sunbowl Base lodge. The Kidderbrook chairlift was the only lift installed during Victoria USA's ownership.

=== Intrawest ownership ===
Intrawest purchased the ski area from Victoria USA, Inc. in 1994 and quickly started another round of new lift installations, eventually rolling out four new high speed six pack chairlifts. This project was named the "URSA" project after the Latin, bear, which represents their logo. The first of the high speed six packs arrived in 1995 with American Express. The lift used the same alignment as the Betwixt Double, which was dismantled. Standard Double and Suntanner Double were also removed to maintain capacity, as all three doubles were adjacent to one another and serviced the same terrain. In 1999, a new lift line was cut parallel to Grizzly Double and URSA Express was installed as the second high speed six pack. With this installation, Grizzly Double was removed and North American Quad was relocated two years later to maintain capacity. 2001 brought the final two high speed six packs, with Sun Bowl Quad being realigned so its lift line could be used for Sunrise Express and a new lift line cut above the top station of Sunrise Express for Shooting Star. Shooting Star allowed skiers to often bypass Kidderbrook on their ride to the top, and Kidderbrook became a secondary lift used only on crowded days. When Intrawest faced tough times, Stratton sold the often-idle Kidderbrook chairlift following the 2006–07 season.

In 1996, a 150,000,000 US gallons (570,000,000 L; 120,000,000 imp gal) snowmaking reservoir was constructed adjacent to the Winhall River, along with significant upgrades to Stratton lake, increasing the mountain's water storage from approximately 25,000,000 US gallons (95,000,000 L; 21,000,000 imp gal) to about 200,000,000 US gallons (760,000,000 L; 170,000,000 imp gal).

Intrawest announced $6.5 million of projects for the 2013–2014 season, including new snowcats, improved snowmaking, two new glades, and base resort improvements. The aging gondola cabins were replaced the summer of 2014.

During Intrawest's ownership, Stratton developed premium real estate. The parking lot in front of Black Bear Lodge was cleared and became the Village Common. Two connected condominium buildings collectively named Long Trail House were constructed in 1999 and 2000. Long Trail was followed by Rising Bear Lodge in 2004, Hearthstone Lodge in 2005, and Founders Lodge in 2006. Construction began on an additional condominium building adjacent to Founders Lodge, but work stopped when the housing market started to collapse in late 2006. Additionally, townhouses were built on the mountain. Snowbridge was constructed from 1997 to 1998 on the trails "Old Log Road", "Ethan's Alley", and "Lower Wanderer" for ski-in/ski-out access. Solstice was constructed from 2001 to 2002 on the trails "91", "91 Extension", and "Solstice Way" for ski-in/ski-out access. TreeTop was built between 2003 and 2006 as ski-in properties off of the trail "TreeTop Way", but they could not be ski-out due to a contract signed with the Solstice homeowners forbidding the construction of additional ski-in/ski-out townhouses. In the late 2000s, Stratton sold 12 large plots of land above the Villager chairlift and called the ski-in/ski-out houses Tamarack Heights. This is the flagship community at Stratton and the final real estate project undertaken by Intrawest.

=== Alterra Mountain Company ownership ===
In 2017, KSL Capital Partners and Henry Crown and Company acquired Intrawest, combining Stratton and an assortment of other mountains into a new company called Alterra Mountain Company. Over the summer of 2018, the resort installed a new high-speed quad chairlift to replace the aging Snow Bowl lift. Stratton began offering summertime mountain biking in 2019, with mountain bike trails opening in stages starting in 2019.

During summer 2023 Stratton underwent $6.9 million in capital improvements, adding RFID gates, a reimagined learning area including 3 new covered conveyor lifts, a new snowcat, and the addition to Klik snowmaking hydrants to a number of their trails.

== Mountain statistics ==
Stratton has 99 trails over 670 acres (2.7 km^{2}) of skiable terrain, 95% of which has snowmaking. 40% of the trails are rated as easy, 35% are intermediate, and 25% are advanced. There are eleven lifts, which can transport 33,928 people an hour. The mountain's base is at 1,872 ft (571 m) and the summit is at 3,875 ft (1,181 m) for a vertical drop of 2,003 ft (611 m). Stratton has an average annual snowfall of 180 inches (15 ft; 4.6 m).

== Trails ==
Stratton has 99 trails covering over 670 acres (2.7 km^{2}) of skiable terrain.

Easier	More Difficult	Most Difficult	Experts Only	Terrain Parks
91	Bear Bottom	Big D	Bear Down	East Byrneside SBX
91 Extension	Beeline	Dino's Drop	Free Fall	Progression Park
Cabot's Run	Betwixt	Franks Fall Line	Lower Slalom Glade	Big Ben Park
Churchill Downs	Black Bear	Liftline Cut Through	Stevek	Tyrolienne Park
Craig's Run	Busters Trail	Lower Liftline	Upper Down Easter	Suntanner Park
Daniel Webster	Duck Soup	Lower Spruce (m)	Upper Grizzly Bear
Downtowner	East Byrneside	Lower Switchback	Upper Spruce
Drifter Link	Gentle Ben	Polar Bear	World Cup (m)
Ethan's Alley	Get My Drift	Rick's Catch 22	Vertigo (g)
Flukey's Run	Interstate	Rimeline	Free Fall Gully (g)
Grizzly Access	Janeway Junction	Rising Star	Kidderbrook Ravine (g)
Hemlock	Lower Down Easter	The Chute	Squirrel's Nest Glade (g)
Home Run	Lower Drifter	Upper Kidderbrook	Why Not (g)
Lad's Legacy	Lower Grizzly Bear	Upper Liftline	Moon Dance (g)
Lower East Meadow	Lower Standard	Upper Middlebrook	Test Pilot (g)
Lower Kidderbrook	Number 6	Upper Slalom Glade	Shred Wood Forest (g)
Lower Middlebrook	Old Smoothie	Upper Standard
Lower Tamarack	Rowley's Run	Upper Switchback
Lower Wanderer	Shooter	Upper Tamarack
Lower West Meadow	Shortcut Big Ben	Dancing Bear (g)
Main Line	Shortcut Gentle Ben	Diamond in the Rough (g)
Mark's Run	Snow Bowl Alley	Cabin Fever (g)
Mike's Cut-through	Spillway
Mike's Way	Sun Bowl Express
Old Log Road	Sunbeam
Old Number 8	Sunriser Supertrail
Overpass	Suntanner
Runaway	Tink's Link
Solstice Way	Tree Top Way
Stage 1	Upper Drifter
Underpass	Way Home
Upper East Meadow	White Birch
Upper Wanderer	Yodeler
Upper West Meadow	Eclipse (g)
Village Walk	Emerald Forest (g)
Work Road	Buckshot (g)
Yodeler Express	West Pilot (g)
Daniel's Web (g)	Moonbeam (g)

- (g) – gladed trail with trees
- (m) – trail with moguls regularly when conditions provide

== Lifts ==
Lift Name	Length	Vertical	Type	Make	Year Installed
Gondola	7,379 feet (2,249 m)	1,742 feet (531 m)	Gondola	Poma	1988 (original) 2014 (new cabins)
American Express	3,238 feet (987 m)	658 feet (201 m)	High Speed Six Pack	Doppelmayr	1995
URSA Express	4,620 feet (1,410 m)	1,340 feet (410 m)	High Speed Six Pack	Garaventa CTEC	1999
Sunrise Express	4,502 feet (1,372 m)	1,122 feet (342 m)	High Speed Six Pack	Garaventa CTEC	2001
Shooting Star	3,305 feet (1,007 m)	798 feet (243 m)	High Speed Six Pack	Garaventa CTEC	2001
Snow Bowl Express	4,382 feet (1,336 m)	1,371 feet (418 m)	High Speed Quad	Doppelmayr	2018
Solstice			Fixed Quad	Poma	2001
South American			Fixed Quad	Poma	2001
Tamarack	3,499 feet (1,066 m)	569 feet (173 m)	Fixed Triple	Borvig	1977
Villager	1,073 feet (327 m)	155 feet (47 m)	Fixed Double	Poma	1985

=== Past Lifts ===
Lift Name	Length	Vertical	Type	Make	Year Installed	Year Removed	Notes
Betwixed Double	3,235 feet (986 m)	649 feet (198 m)	Fixed Double	Borvig	1982	1995	Sold to Magic Mountain. Replaced by American Express
Grizzly Double	4,765 feet (1,452 m)	1,317 feet (401 m)	Fixed Double	Borvig	1977	1999	Replaced by URSA Express
Kidderbrook Quad	6,285 feet (1,916 m)	1,476 feet (450 m)	Fixed Quad	Poma	1989	2007	Sold to Jay Peak and Mont Saint-Sauveur
Lower T-Bar	2,455 feet (748 m)	373 feet (114 m)	T-Bar	Hall	1963	1976
North American Double	4,500 feet (1,400 m)	1,125 feet (343 m)	Fixed Double	Heron	1961	1985	Replaced by North American Quad
North American Quad	4,380 feet (1,340 m)	1,173 feet (358 m)	Fixed Quad	Poma	1985	1999	Replaced the North American Double. Relocated to Yodeler as South American.
SMS Poma	1,726 feet (526 m)	572 feet (174 m)	Platter Lift	Heron-Poma	1971	2018
Snow Bowl Quad	4,877 feet (1,487 m)	1,380 feet (420 m)	Fixed Quad	Poma	1986	2018	Sold to Magic Mountain. Replaced by Snow Bowl Express
Snow Bowl Double	4,900 feet (1,500 m)	1,386 feet (422 m)	Fixed Double	Heron	1964	1986	Replaced by Snow Bowl
Standard Double	3,256 feet (992 m)	644 feet (196 m)	Fixed Double	Heron	1966	1995	Removed when American Express was installed
Sun Bowl Double	4,773 feet (1,455 m)	1,113 feet (339 m)	Fixed Double	Heron	1968	1986	Replaced by Sun Bowl Quad
Sun Bowl Quad	4,639 feet (1,414 m)	1,110 feet (340 m)	Fixed Quad	Poma	1986	2001	Replaced Sun Bowl Double. Realigned and turned into Solstice
Suntanner Double	2,800 feet (850 m)	650 feet (200 m)	Fixed Double	Heron	1961	1995	Removed when American Express was installed
Tamarack Double	3,499 feet (1,066 m)	569 feet (173 m)	Fixed Double	Borvig	1976	1977	Converted to triple
Teddy Bear			Platter Lift	Poma	2000	2007
Tyrolienne Double	1,700 feet (520 m)	315 feet (96 m)	Fixed Double	Heron	1961	2001	Removed when South American was installed
Upper T-Bar	1,580 feet (480 m)	302 feet (92 m)	T-Bar	Hall	1963	1978	Sold to Bradford, MA

== Future projects ==
Stratton is expected to replace the Tamarack Triple with a High Speed Quad in 2025. Additionally, Stratton plans to upgrade the Mid Mountain Lodge, and either replace or modify the Gondola in the near future.
