= Pats Peak =

Ski resort in New Hampshire, United States

- Interactive map of Pats Peak
- Location: Henniker, New Hampshire, U.S.
- Coordinates: 43°09′48″N 71°47′45″W
- Vertical: 770 ft (230 m)
- Top elevation: 1,460 ft (450 m)
- Base elevation: 690 ft (210 m)
- Skiable area: 103 acres (420,000 m^{2})
- Trails: 28
- Longest run: 1.5 miles (2.4 km)
- Lift system: 1 Quad, 3 Triples, 2 Doubles, 2 Magic Carpets, 1 J-bar, 2 Tows
- Website: www.patspeak.com

Pats Peak is an independent alpine ski resort in Henniker, New Hampshire, in the United States. The ski area opened in 1963 and has a vertical drop of 770 feet (230 m). It is roughly a 90-minute drive from Boston, Massachusetts.

The four Patenaude brothers bought the original 200-acre (0.81 km^{2}) plot of land for the Peak from their father, Merle Patenaude. It has been owned continuously by the Patenaude family since it opened, with three original owners selling their parts of the land to the fourth. The resort has become a popular destination for night skiing.

== Trails and lifts ==
Most trails are named after winds, such as Cyclone, Hurricane, Twister and Tornado. The trail network is 50% novice, 21% intermediate, 12% advanced, and 17% expert. Ski magazine said it has the best slalom skiing terrain in New Hampshire (FIS Race Trail, Expert). The mountain contains two or three (depending on conditions) terrain parks and nine official glades.

Pats Peak has an alpine race team in the Central Division of the NHARA racing league. The team encompasses J6, J5, J4, J3, J2, and J1 age groups. The team is mostly coached by volunteers.

In the 2013-14 season, Pats Peak opened an expansion on the east side of Craney Hill. Named Cascade Basin, it includes a triple chair lift covering 370 vertical feet. In 2017, Pats Peak installed a used CTEC Triple Chairlift to replace the aging Peak Double Chairlift. The new Peak Triple was formerly the Snowdance Triple at Ascutney Mountain Resort in Vermont. For the 2025-26 season, the Hurricane triple chairlift will be replaced by a new quad lift with loading carpet. Designed by SkyTrac Lifts of Utah, this upgrade is aimed at improving access to various trails from what was the Hurricane unload area, and also loading experience.

Pats Peak has six chairlifts and two magic carpets. There are also three tows: J-Bar, Beginner Handle, and Park Handle.

Name	Type	Builder	Built	Notes
Hurricane Quad	Quad	SkyTrac	2025	Has a loading carpet.
Peak	Triple	CTEC	2017	Has a loading carpet.
Cascade Basin	Triple	Hall	2013	
Turbulence	Triple	Partek	2003	
Vortex	Double	Hall	1998	
Valley	Double	Müller	1969	
Gusty	J-Bar	Hall	1997	
