= Magic Mountain Ski Area =

Ski area in Vermont, United States

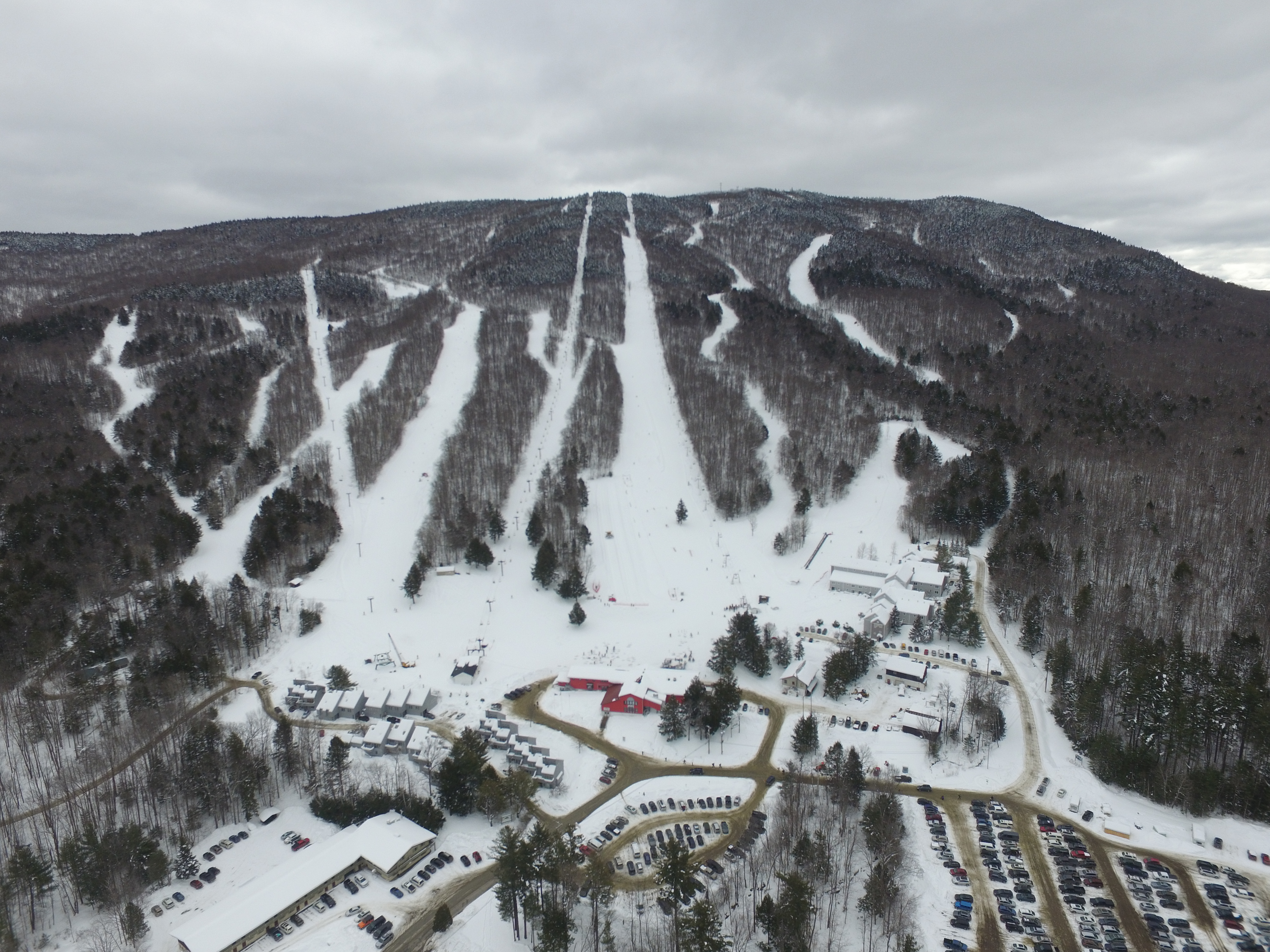
- Magic Mountain

- Location in Vermont Magic Mountain Ski Area (the United States)
- Location: Londonderry, Windham County, Vermont, United States
- Nearest city: Londonderry
- Coordinates: 43°11′34″N 72°45′36″W
- Vertical: 1,500 ft (460 m)
- Top elevation: 2,850 ft (870 m)
- Base elevation: 1,350 ft (410 m)
- Skiable area: 205 acres (83 ha)
- Trails: 39
- Longest run: 1.6 mi (2.6 km)
- Lift system: 6 total 1 fixed-grip quad chair, 2 fixed-grip double chairs, 1 carpet, 2 handle tows
- Lift capacity: 3,000 passengers/hr
- Snowfall: 145 inches (12.1 ft; 3.7 m)
- Snowmaking: 50%
- Night skiing: Yes terrain park
- Website: www.magicmtn.com

Magic Mountain is a ski resort located on Glebe Mountain in Londonderry, Vermont. It features a 1,500-foot (460 m) vertical drop. The summit is at 2,850 feet (870 m) and the base at 1,350 feet (410 m).

Magic has a long history, dating from the 1960s when ski instructor and film-maker Hans Thorner founded the area as its terrain reminded him of his native Swiss Alps. Part of Vermont's original "Golden Triangle" of ski areas all within 10 miles (16 km) of each other (Stratton Mountain Resort and Bromley Mountain the other two large areas), Magic thrived in the 1960s, 1970s, and early 1980s.

Eventually, Magic was purchased by Boston Concessions, which also owned Bromley in the mid-1980s. After a downturn in the real-estate market starting in the late 1980s, Bromley decided to close Magic in 1991. The multi-year closure in the 1990s ended in 1997 and Magic reopened to the public and regained a small, but passionate following among ski enthusiasts because of its classic, challenging terrain.

However, the ski area also struggled through multiple owners, operators, and aging infrastructure during the 2000s, even as it continued to slowly expand its customer base. With limited capital reserves and in danger of not opening in 2015 and 2016, the ownership group decided to look for a buyer.

A group led by a local Magic skier then raised enough capital to purchase the property and invest over $2 million in significant snowmaking, lift, bar, and lodge improvements. This group, SKI MAGIC LLC, successfully closed on the purchase of Magic in November 2016 and reopened the ski area in late December. SKI MAGIC continues to operate Magic and invest in these critical infrastructure enhancements to improve and sustain the ski area.

== History ==
In 1960, Hans Thorner opened Magic with a T-Bar on the lower half of Magic, followed by a 7,379-foot (2,249 m) double chair in 1962. The 5,400-foot (1,600 m) "Red Chair" double was added in 1971 while trail expansion continued and snow-making was added.

In 1985, Magic Mountain was purchased by Bromley ownership (Boston Concessions) and dramatically increased its skiable terrain, by purchasing and connecting the former Timber Ridge Ski Area. Located on the eastern slope of Glebe Mountain, that area became known as Timber Ridge at Magic.

In 1987, Magic Mountain added a new mid-mountain Poma triple chairlift, serving novice and intermediate terrain.

In 1991, Bromley closed Magic Mountain and Timber Ridge after poor ski seasons and real-estate downturn. With the exception of the summit Heron-Poma double chairlift (Red) and the Pohlig-Yan triple chairlift (Black), all lifts were removed during liquidation.

In 1997, Magic was re-opened by private investors led by a dentist from New Jersey. Magic Mountain Management LLC became the property owner by 2001 led by John Nelson, Rob Lyszczarz and Tom Barker.

In 2003, construction was started on a proposed Borvig double chairlift (from Stratton) that would follow the same line as the former Poma triple chairlift. SKI MAGIC LLC completed the installation of this lift in December 2018.

In 2009, Jim Sullivan, Magic Mountain's operator/manager from 2006-2014 (operating lease from Magic Mountain Management LLC) announced he was looking into a cooperative ownership structure to ensure the future operation, maintenance, and development of the ski area. While some money was raised, ultimately this plan did not work out, and Magic Mountain Management LLC decided to end the Sullivan operating lease in 2014 and transferred the lease to its own Tom Barker under his new company Magic Mountain Resorts, LLC. Barker operated the ski area for the 2014/15 and 2015/16 ski seasons.

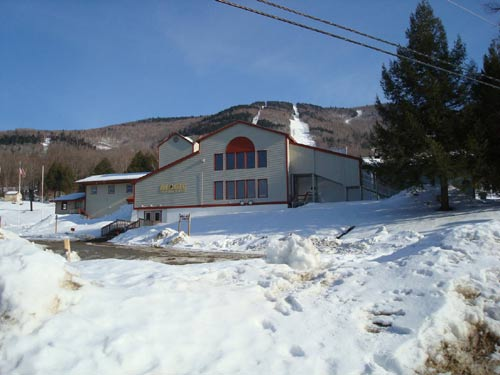
Base lodge at Magic Mountain, ca. 2008

In November 2016, after a poor winter and operating results, Magic Mountain Management LLC sold the ski area property to SKI MAGIC LLC, led by Geoff Hatheway.

In August 2017, SKI MAGIC LLC obtained a Vermont ACT 250 permit for upgrades to snow-making, lifts and lodge. A new magic carpet style lift and beginner/learn-to-ski area, new snow-making pipe, new mid-mountain double chair, and expanded snowmaking pond are key projects in the works for the 2017/18 and 2018/19 seasons. A new-to-Magic fixed-grip Poma Quad (from Stratton) was planned for the 2019/20 season, replacing the old Black Triple Chair lift, to significantly expand Magic's uphill capacity. However it remained unfinished for several seasons, until finally opening on Feb 22, 2024 to much fanfare.

== The mountain ==
The mountain, although not as high as its neighbor's 2,850 feet (870 m), has comparable vertical 1,500 feet (460 m) of skiing, and it can boast of steeper trails (up to 45° at the top of Master Magician). It also has the most extensive tree-skiing/glade network in southern Vermont.

== Trails ==
Magic has 39 trails covering over 135 acres (0.55 km^{2}) of skiable terrain.

Easier	More Difficult	Most Difficult	Experts Only
33rd & 3rd	Bailout	Broomstick	Black Line
Betwixt	Carumba	Heart of Magician	Black Magic
Enchanted Forest	Link	Potter	Green Line
Hocus Pocus	Lower Wizard	Sorcerer	Magician
Kinderspiel	Medium	Talisman	Pitch Black
Little Dipper	Mystery	Terrain Park	Red Line
Lower Magic Carpet	Phoenix	Disappearing Act (g)	Slide of Hans
Lower Magician	Show Off	Séance (g)	Witch
Lower Redline	Thorner's Corner	The Hallows (g)	Goniff Glade (g)
Trudy's Run	Trick		The Wardrobe (g
Upper Magic Carpet	Up Your Sleeve		Twilight Zone (g)
Wand	Upper Wizard		Voodoo (g)
	Vertigo		Warlock (g)
	White Out		White Tiger (g)
	Pixie Dust (g)
	White Kitten (g)

- (g) – gladed trail with trees

== Lifts ==
Lift Name	Length	Vertical	Type	Make	Year Installed
Black Line Quad		1,456 feet (444 m)	Fixed Quad	Poma	2020
Green Chair			Fixed Double	Borvig	2018
Red Chair	5,350 feet (1,630 m)	1,500 feet (460 m)	Fixed Double	Heron-Poma	1971

=== Past Lifts ===
Lift Name	Length	Vertical	Type	Make	Year Installed	Year Removed	Notes
Black Chair	4,800 feet (1,500 m)	1,575 feet (480 m)	Fixed Triple	Yan-Pohlig	1961	2019	Originally a double lift named Blue Chair, retrofitted to be a triple in 1985
Green Chair	1,140 feet (350 m)	180 feet (55 m)	Fixed Double	Hall	1964	1991	Sold to Mount Tom
Showoff T-Bar	2,100 feet (640 m)	833 feet (254 m)	T-Bar	Hall	1960	1987	Replaced by Sun Corner Triple
Sun Corner Triple	3,516 feet (1,072 m)	833 feet (254 m)	Fixed Triple	Poma	1987	1995	Sold to Berkshire East Ski Resort. Alignment used by current Green Chair
