= Bromley Mountain =

Ski area in Vermont, United States

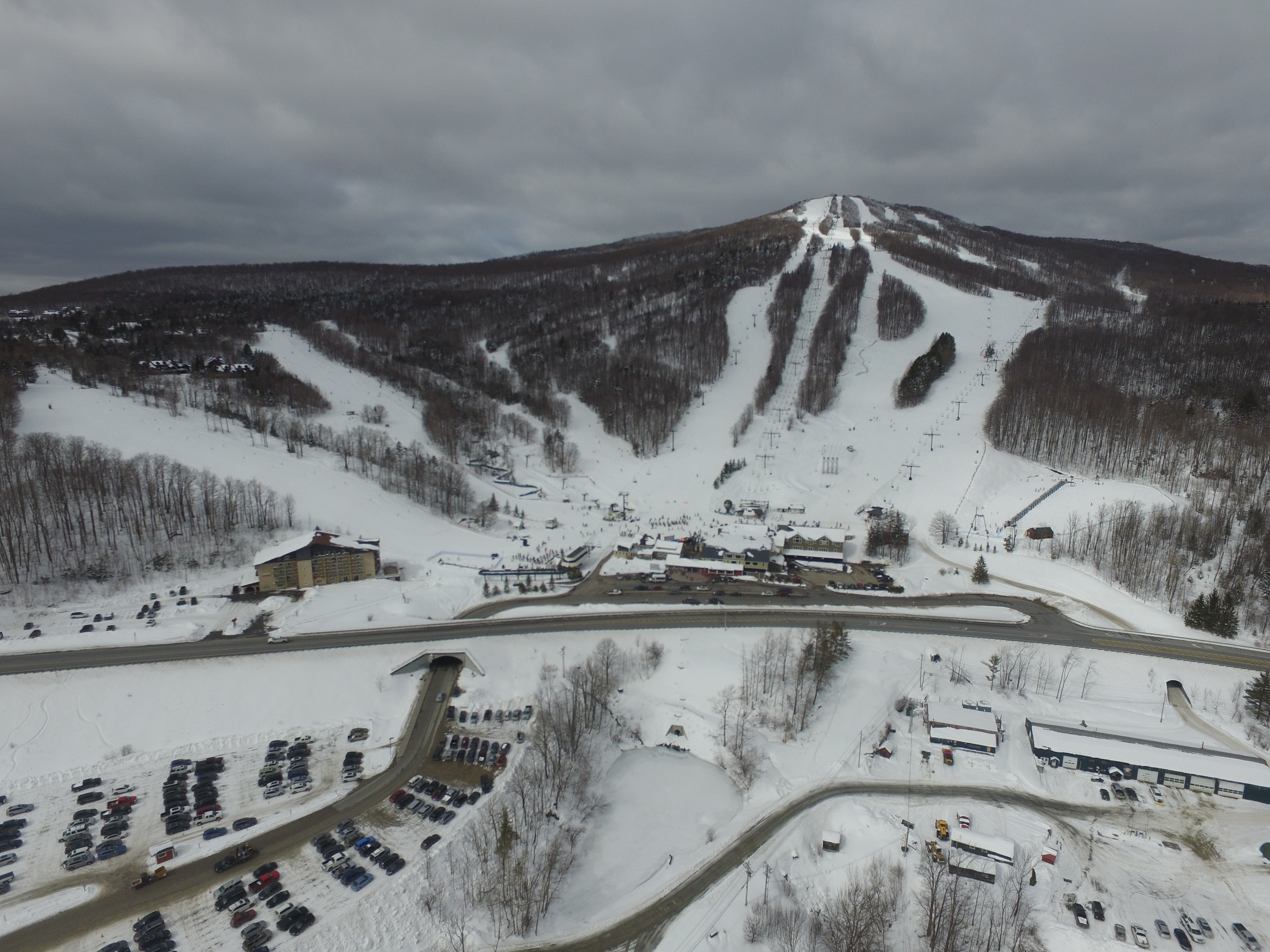
- Bromley Mountain

- Location within the United States Location within Vermont
- Location: Peru, Vermont, USA
- Nearest city: Manchester
- Coordinates: 43°13′40″N 72°56′19″W
- Vertical: 1,334 feet (407 m)
- Top elevation: 3,284 feet (1,001 m)
- Base elevation: 1,950 feet (594 m)
- Skiable area: 178 acres (72 ha)
- Trails: 47
- Longest run: Pushover
- Lift system: doppelmayr, hall and sun kid
- Terrain parks: Halo, The garden, and Bonanza, Riglet Park for kids! (Special Events Only)
- Snowfall: 145 in (368.3 cm)

Bromley Mountain is located in southern Vermont, United States and is part of the Green Mountains. It is located in the town of Peru, Bennington County, seven miles (11 km) east of Manchester, Vermont and just west of the Peru town center. It is a popular destination for skiing and snowboarding.

The Bromley Mountain resort was founded by Fred Pabst Jr., the grandson of the famous Captain Frederick Pabst, the founder of Pabst Blue Ribbon beer. It is home to 47 trails, including 6 glades and 3 freestyle terrain parks. Trails range from beginner to expert and are served by 10 lifts. In SKI Magazine's October 2014 issue, Bromley was ranked within the top three "Kid Friendly" mountains in the East on their list of Top-Ranked Eastern Ski Resorts.

Due to its southern exposure, Bromley is known as "The Sun Mountain." The Long Trail and Appalachian Trail go over the mountain.

== History ==
In 1935 John Perry, David Parsons, and Rolando Palmedo planned the "Bromley Run" from an airplane. The following year the first trail was cut on the west side of the mountain by Ralph Hutchinson and the Works Progress Administration and in 1938, Fred Pabst Jr. son of Pabst Brewing Company founder, Frederick Pabst opened Little Bromley Ski Area as part of his Ski Tows Inc empire. In January 1943, a 2,800-foot (850 m) J-bar opened between the Twister and East Meadow slopes and a second J-bar opened shortly after. With the addition of the J-bars, Bromley was able to advertise one mile (1.6 km) long tandem lift serving 1,300 feet (400 m), making it a major player in the New England ski industry. In 1958, Bromley installed a new 5,700-foot (1,700 m) Riblet double chairlift to the summit, making Bromley one of only four ski areas in the state with a chairlift. Bromley's next big step came after a rough winter season of 1964–65. For the 1965–67 season, Pabst invested in a large Larchmont snowmaking system composed of more than 50 snow-guns, eighteen miles (29 km) of snowmaking pipe, and 9,000,000-US-gallon (34,000,000 L; 7,500,000 imp gal) of stored water. The system covered 23 trails and was advertised as the world's largest. That same season, two new Riblet chairlifts were installed.

Facing heart problems, Fred Pabst Jr. stepped down as Bromley president in 1971. After he left, a large expansion took place during the 1974 season when Bromley spent $1 million on snowmaking and lift additions. To attract business in the summer, in 1976 Stig Albertsson installed North America's first triple-tracked alpine slide. On March 1, 1977, Fred Pabst Jr. died of a heart attack. After his passing, Bromley was sold to Stratton in 1979 and changed hands to Moore and Munger, Inc the following spring. In 1984 the Sun Chair was finished and a new Von-Roll double was added to the lower half. Bromley was sold again in 1987 to Magic Mountain's Simon Oren who sold it to Joe O'Donnell and Petros Palandijan shortly after in 1990. During the 1997–98 season, the last of the original J-bars were removed as well as the first chairlift. The Sun Mountain Express Doppelmayr Detachable Quad chairlift was also installed, cutting the ride to the summit by more than half. In June 2011 O'Donnell hired Brian and Tyler Fairbank of the Fairbank Group to operate the resort. The Fairbank Group also operates the O'Donnell owned Jiminy Peak Mountain Resort.

== Statistics ==
- Important facts
  - Year Opened: 1936
  - Number of Lifts: 9
  - High-speed quads: 1
  - Quad chairs: 1
  - Double chairs: 4
  - Surface lifts: 3
  - Uphill Lift Capacity: 10,806 skiers per hour
  - On Mountain Lodging: Bromley Village and Sun Lodge
- Elevation
  - Base: 1,950 feet (590 m)
  - Summit: 3,284 feet (1,001 m)
  - Vertical drop: 1,334 feet (407 m)
  - Longest run: 2.5 miles (4.0 km) - Runaround
  - Snowmaking: 86%
- Types of runs
  - Beginner: 32%
  - Intermediate: 37%
  - Advanced: 31%

== Trails ==
Easier	More Difficult	Most Difficult
13	17	16

== Lifts ==
Lift Name	Vertical Rise	Length	Type
Alpine Double	672 feet (205 m)	2,593 feet (790 m)	Double
Blue Ribbon Quad	926 feet (282 m)	3,200 feet (980 m)	Quad
East Meadow Chairlift	385 feet (117 m)	2,140 feet (650 m)	Double
Lord's Prayer T-Bar			T-Bar
Plaza Chairlift	321 feet (98 m)	1,920 feet (590 m)	Double
Sun Chairlift	1,213 feet (370 m)	4,803 feet (1,464 m)	Double
Sun Mountain Express Quad	1,334 feet (407 m)	5,444 feet (1,659 m)	Quad

== Grooming ==
Bromley has two Bison snow groomers and one Bombardier BR 350 groomer.

== Lodges ==
- Base Lodge: Located at the base and main entrance to the mountain, with ski shop, rentals, tickets, two cafeterias, the Wild Boar Restaurant and Bar, daycare, and ski and snowboard school desks.
- Kid's Cabin: Located in the Learning Center near the Star Carpet, it houses a bathroom, hot chocolate machine, and water cooler.

== Ticket Prices ==
As of 2022, a one-day ticket to Bromley costs $89. Back in the early 2000s, an adult ticket cost around $50 and in the early 90s a ticket was around $35. During the mountain's first season, a one-day adult ticket was only $4.

== Summer Attractions ==
During the summer, Bromley has a Mountain Adventure Park which includes an alpine slide, multiple trampolines, a climbing wall, mini golf, space bikes, a giant swing, a waterslide, a Kidzone fun park, and scenic chairlift rides. The mountain resort also has an Treetop Adventure Course with 5 different challenging courses of ropes, zip-lines, and bridges. The Sun Mountain Flyer, a 0.5-mile (0.80 km) zip-line that goes up to 50 miles per hour (80 km/h), was retired in 2024.

== Nearby Mountains ==
Bromley Mountain's closest neighbors are Stratton Mountain and Magic Mountain. Both mountains are visible from Bromley's peak and within 20 minutes driving distance. Stratton has 94 trails over 600 acres (240 ha) of land and Magic is home to 43 trails and 135 acres (55 ha).
