= Mission Ridge Ski Area =

Ski area in Washington, United States

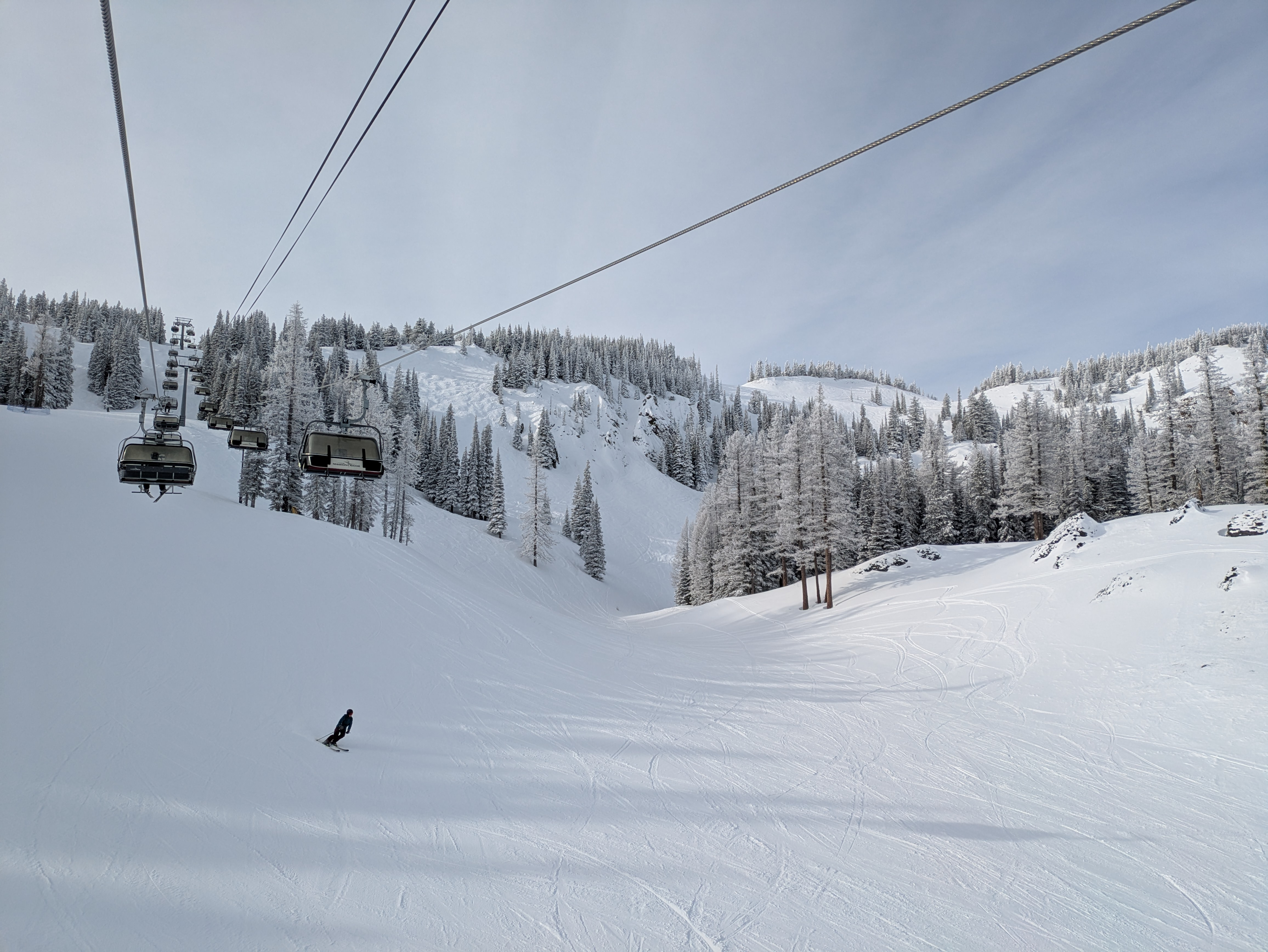
- Varied inbounds terrain visible from the Wenatchee Express chairlift

- Location in Washington Location in the United States
- Location: Chelan County, Washington
- Nearest city: Wenatchee: 12 miles (20 km)
- Coordinates: 47.292°N 120.399°W
- Vertical: 2,250 feet (686 m)
- Top elevation: 6,820 feet (2,079 m)
- Base elevation: 4,570 feet (1,393 m)
- Skiable area: 2,000 acres (8.1 km^{2})
- Trails: 36; 10% easiest 60% more difficult 30% most difficult
- Lift system: 4 chairlifts 2 tows - one for terrain park
- Lift capacity: 4,910 / hr
- Terrain parks: 1 main one but most of the time there are 3
- Snowfall: 200 inches (16.7 ft; 5.1 m)
- Snowmaking: yes
- Night skiing: 4 - 9 pm
- Website: Mission Ridge.com

Mission Ridge Ski Area is a ski area in the western United States, located near Wenatchee, Washington. On the leeward east slope of the Cascade Range, its base elevation is at 4,570 feet (1,393 m) above sea level with the peak at 6,820 feet (2,079 m), yielding a vertical drop of 2,250 feet (686 m). Mission Ridge receives an average snowfall of 200 inches (16.7 ft; 5.1 m) per year, with over 300 sunny days, and its slopes face primarily northeast.

== Alpine skiing ==
Mission Ridge has six lifts providing access to 2,000 acres (8.1 km^{2}) of terrain:

- One High speed detachable quad, with bubbles
- Three fixed grip double chairlifts
- Two rope tows

Mission Ridge has a relatively small terrain park, called the B-24 terrain park.

The ski area has had night skiing and snowmaking since 1978, and expanded the snowmaking capacity in 2005.

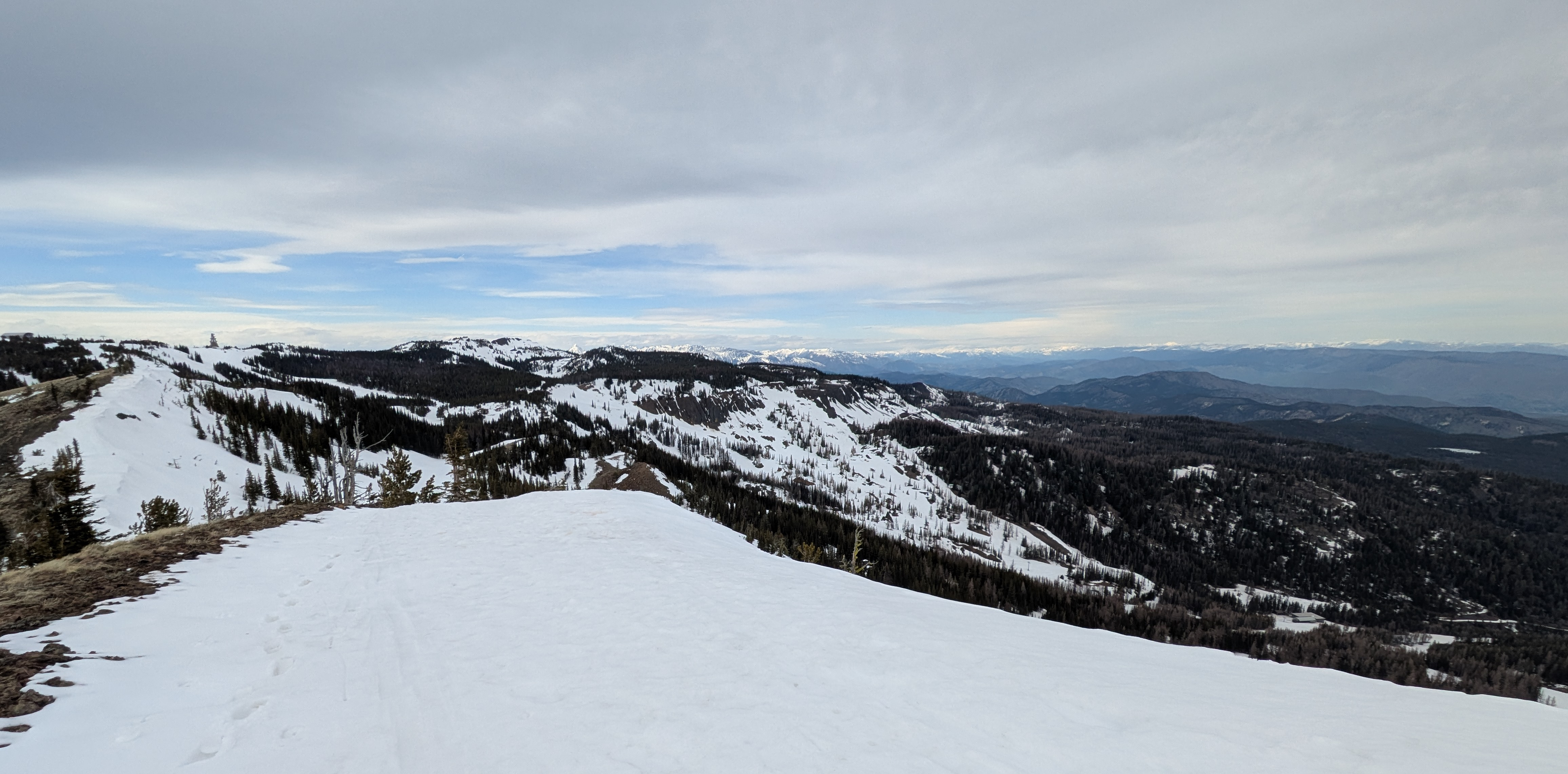
Much of the resort can be viewed from the ridge just west of Wenatchee Mountain, with the Wenatchee Express lift ending at the far left of the image and Midway visible at the bottom right

== Base facilities ==
The Hampton Lodge at the base of the mountain includes a restaurant, bar, shop, and rental center. Additionally, facilities in the base area include lesson centers and first aid operations.

== History ==
The name "Mission Ridge" was selected in June 1964, and it began operations 60 years ago in the fall of 1966 with two chairlifts in the Squilchuck Basin, where a Walla Walla–based B-24 Liberator bomber crashed on September 30, 1944. Two more lifts were constructed in 1970 and 1972. A wing section of the B-24 plane was removed from the mountain and taken down to the lodge in 1985; it was hauled back up the mountain in October 1992, and mounted on steel poles above "Bomber Bowl."

Bill Johnson, the gold medalist in downhill at the 1984 Winter Olympics, trained at the Mission Ridge Ski Academy as a teenager. In 2005, the new Liberator Express replaced Chair 2, and then in 2020, the Wenatchee Express bubble lift replaced Liberator Express.
