= Peru, Vermont =

- Town
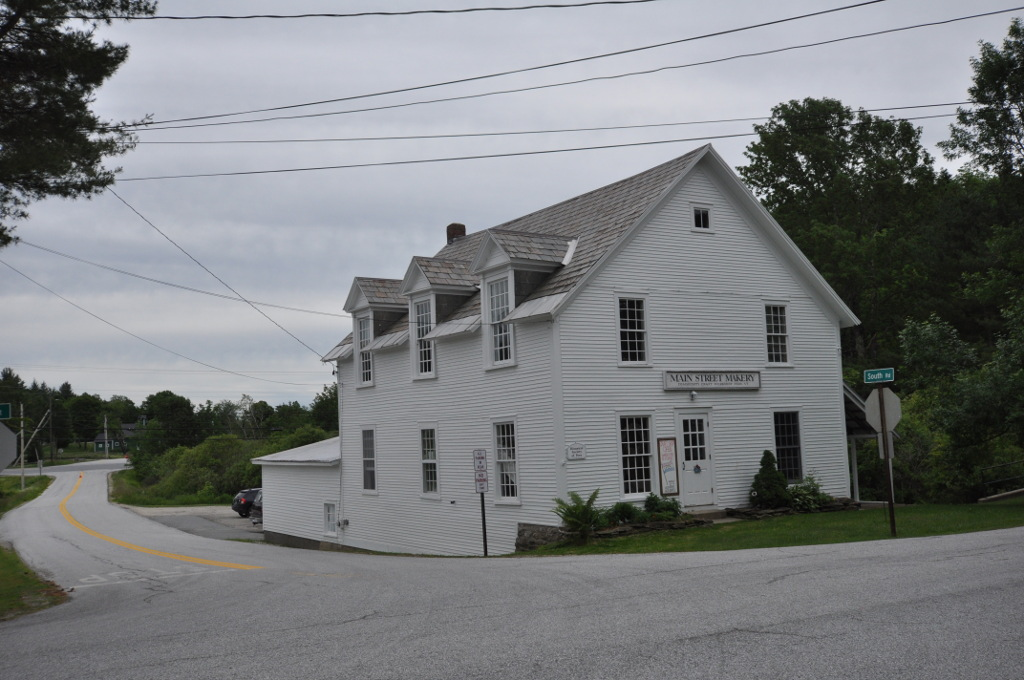
- Main Street Makery, Peru

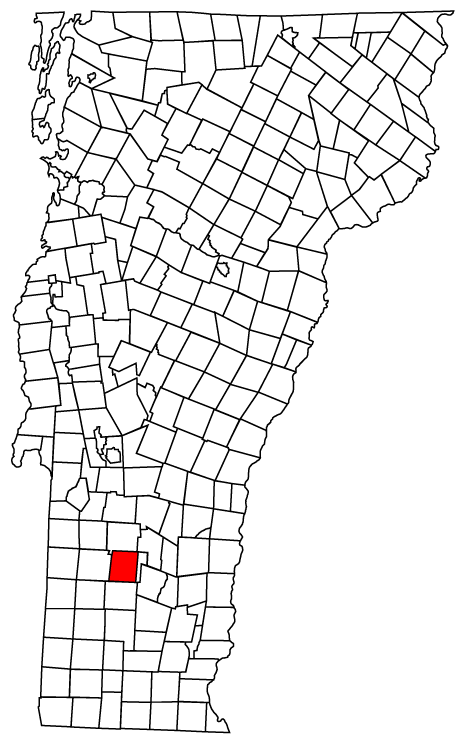
- Peru, Vermont
- Coordinates: 43°15′18″N 72°53′48″W
- Country: United States
- State: Vermont
- County: Bennington

Area
  - Total: 37.3 sq mi (96.7 km^{2})
  - Land: 37.2 sq mi (96.4 km^{2})
  - Water: 0.12 sq mi (0.3 km^{2})
- Elevation: 2,024 ft (617 m)

Population (2020)
  - Total: 531
  - Density: 14/sq mi (5.5/km^{2})
- Time zone: UTC−5 (Eastern (EST))
  - Summer (DST): UTC−4 (EDT)
- ZIP Codes: 05152 (Peru); 05148 (Londonderry)
- Area code: 802
- FIPS code: 50-55000
- GNIS feature ID: 1462172
- Website: www.peruvt.org

Peru is a town in Bennington County, Vermont, United States. The population was 531 at the 2020 census. Originally known as Bromley, the town name was changed to "Peru" by the land grantees as a way of attracting land buyers to an area that had been described as 36 square miles (93 km^{2}) of "trees, bears and mountain lions".

== History ==
The town was chartered with the name Bromley in 1761 by Benning Wentworth, governor of the Province of New Hampshire. The first white settlement is said to have been in 1773, by William Barlow of Woodstock, Connecticut. The town of Bromley was organized at a town meeting in March 1802. As of the autumn of 1802 there were 14 families living in the town. In late 1803 or early 1804 the name of the town was changed to Peru. The new name was adopted to attract more people to the town by associating it with the South American country Peru, which was considered to be a place of great wealth, apparently due to the rich silver mining industry there.

== Geography ==
Peru is located in northeastern Bennington County, bordered by Rutland County to the north. The crest of the Green Mountains runs from north to the south through the western half of the town, traversed by the Long Trail/Appalachian Trail. 3,300-foot-high (1,000 m) Bromley Mountain and its ski area are in the southern part of the town, and 3,392-foot (1,034 m) Styles Peak and 3,428-foot (1,045 m) Peru Peak are to the north. The village or town center of Peru is in the southeastern part of town, at elevation 1,706 feet (520 m). Vermont Route 11 crosses the southeastern part of the town, through the town center and past Bromley Mountain Ski Area.

According to the United States Census Bureau, the town has a total area of 37.3 square miles (96.7 km^{2}), of which 37.2 square miles (96.4 km^{2}) is land and 0.1 square miles (0.3 km^{2}), or 0.32%, is water.

=== Climate ===
This climatic region is typified by large seasonal temperature differences, with warm to hot (and often humid) summers and cold (sometimes severely cold) winters. According to the Köppen Climate Classification system, Peru has a humid continental climate, abbreviated "Dfb" on climate maps.

Climate data for Peru, Vermont (1991–2020 normals)
| Month | Jan | Feb | Mar | Apr | May | Jun | Jul | Aug | Sep | Oct | Nov | Dec | Year |
|---|---|---|---|---|---|---|---|---|---|---|---|---|---|
| Record high °F (°C) | 67 (19) | 64 (18) | 88 (31) | 92 (33) | 96 (36) | 99 (37) | 99 (37) | 96 (36) | 94 (34) | 88 (31) | 82 (28) | 67 (19) | 99 (37) |
| Mean daily maximum °F (°C) | 26.6 (−3.0) | 30.5 (−0.8) | 37.9 (3.3) | 50.3 (10.2) | 64.1 (17.8) | 69.7 (20.9) | 74.7 (23.7) | 72.9 (22.7) | 67.0 (19.4) | 56.0 (13.3) | 42.7 (5.9) | 32.1 (0.1) | 52.0 (11.1) |
| Daily mean °F (°C) | 17.2 (−8.2) | 20.5 (−6.4) | 27.6 (−2.4) | 40.1 (4.5) | 53.1 (11.7) | 60.5 (15.8) | 65.6 (18.7) | 63.8 (17.7) | 57.2 (14.0) | 46.4 (8.0) | 34.3 (1.3) | 24.0 (−4.4) | 42.5 (5.9) |
| Mean daily minimum °F (°C) | 7.8 (−13.4) | 10.4 (−12.0) | 17.3 (−8.2) | 29.8 (−1.2) | 42.0 (5.6) | 51.3 (10.7) | 56.4 (13.6) | 54.6 (12.6) | 47.4 (8.6) | 36.7 (2.6) | 25.8 (−3.4) | 15.9 (−8.9) | 32.9 (0.6) |
| Record low °F (°C) | −33 (−36) | −29 (−34) | −13 (−25) | 5 (−15) | 21 (−6) | 32 (0) | 37 (3) | 31 (−1) | 22 (−6) | 14 (−10) | 2 (−17) | −23 (−31) | −33 (−36) |
| Average precipitation inches (mm) | 3.90 (99) | 3.40 (86) | 4.15 (105) | 3.97 (101) | 4.06 (103) | 5.01 (127) | 4.49 (114) | 4.64 (118) | 3.98 (101) | 5.16 (131) | 3.75 (95) | 4.47 (114) | 50.98 (1,294) |
| Average snowfall inches (cm) | 29.9 (76) | 24.3 (62) | 25.0 (64) | 7.8 (20) | 0.1 (0.25) | 0 (0) | 0 (0) | 0 (0) | 0 (0) | 1.0 (2.5) | 6.7 (17) | 21.6 (55) | 116.4 (296.75) |
| Average extreme snow depth inches (cm) | 20 (51) | 27 (69) | 28 (71) | 16 (41) | 0 (0) | 0 (0) | 0 (0) | 0 (0) | 0 (0) | 1 (2.5) | 5 (13) | 13 (33) | 31 (79) |
| Average precipitation days (≥ 0.01 in) | 11 | 9 | 11 | 11 | 13 | 12 | 12 | 10 | 9 | 11 | 10 | 11 | 130 |
| Average snowy days (≥ 0.1 in) | 10 | 8 | 9 | 3 | 0 | 0 | 0 | 0 | 0 | 1 | 3 | 8 | 42 |
Source: NOAA

== Demographics ==
Historical population
| Census | Pop. | Note | %± |
|---|---|---|---|
| 1790 | 71 | | — |
| 1800 | 130 | | 83.1% |
| 1810 | 239 | | 83.8% |
| 1820 | 314 | | 31.4% |
| 1830 | 455 | | 44.9% |
| 1840 | 578 | | 27.0% |
| 1850 | 567 | | −1.9% |
| 1860 | 543 | | −4.2% |
| 1870 | 500 | | −7.9% |
| 1880 | 556 | | 11.2% |
| 1890 | 445 | | −20.0% |
| 1900 | 373 | | −16.2% |
| 1910 | 242 | | −35.1% |
| 1920 | 216 | | −10.7% |
| 1930 | 156 | | −27.8% |
| 1940 | 142 | | −9.0% |
| 1950 | 197 | | 38.7% |
| 1960 | 194 | | −1.5% |
| 1970 | 243 | | 25.3% |
| 1980 | 312 | | 28.4% |
| 1990 | 324 | | 3.8% |
| 2000 | 416 | | 28.4% |
| 2010 | 375 | | −9.9% |
| 2020 | 531 | | 41.6% |
U.S. Decennial Census

As of the census of 2000, there were 416 people, 157 households, and 118 families residing in the town. The population density was 11.1 people per square mile (4.3 people/km^{2}). There were 445 housing units at an average density of 11.9 units per square mile (4.6 units/km^{2}). The racial makeup of the town was 97.84% White, 0.24% Asian, and 1.92% from two or more races. Hispanic or Latino of any race were 0.72% of the population.

There were 157 households, out of which 35.7% had children under the age of 18 living with them, 66.2% were married couples living together, 5.1% had a female householder with no husband present, and 24.8% were non-families. Of all households, 17.2% were made up of individuals, and 7.6% had someone living alone who was 65 years of age or older. The average household size was 2.65 and the average family size was 3.03.

In the town, the age distribution of the population shows 25.7% under the age of 18, 5.0% from 18 to 24, 26.4% from 25 to 44, 27.9% from 45 to 64, and 14.9% who were 65 years of age or older. The median age was 41 years. For every 100 females, there were 103.9 males. For every 100 females age 18 and over, there were 98.1 males.

The median income for a household in the town was $47,188, and the median income for a family was $54,063. Males had a median income of $31,000 versus $25,208 for females. The per capita income for the town was $28,546. None of the families and 0.7% of the population were living below the poverty line, including no under eighteens and none of those over 64.

== Recreation ==
Bromley Mountain ski area offers alpine skiing and snowboarding in the winter and an adventure park in the summer. Hapgood Pond Recreation Area, part of the Green Mountain National Forest, has a developed campground, fishing, swimming, and a one-mile nature trail. Peru is also home to sections of the Appalachian Trail, Long Trail, and Catamount Trail.

== In popular culture ==
The town appeared as "Hadleyville" in the 1987 film Baby Boom starring Diane Keaton.
