= White Hills Ski Resort =

- Interactive map of White Hills Ski Resort
- Location: Newfoundland and Labrador; Canada
- Nearest city: Clarenville
- Coordinates: 48°9′45″N 54°2′50″W
- Vertical: 229 m (751 ft)
- Top elevation: 381 m (1,250 ft)
- Base elevation: 206 m (676 ft)
- Skiable area: 55 acres (0.22 km^{2})
- Trails: 27
- Longest run: Elusive
- Lift system: 2 lifts: 1 fixed-grip triple chair; 1 magic carpet
- Website: White Hills Resort

White Hills is a ski resort located near the town of Clarenville, on the east coast of Newfoundland.

There is currently one fixed grip chair lift to reach the top of the mountain and one magic carpet lift for the beginner hill.

The summit elevation is 374 meters a total 22 hectares of terrain and 11 hectares of snowmaking coverage.

== Trails ==
| Easy | Intermediate | Difficult |
|---|---|---|
| 2 | 11 | 12 |

== Lifts ==
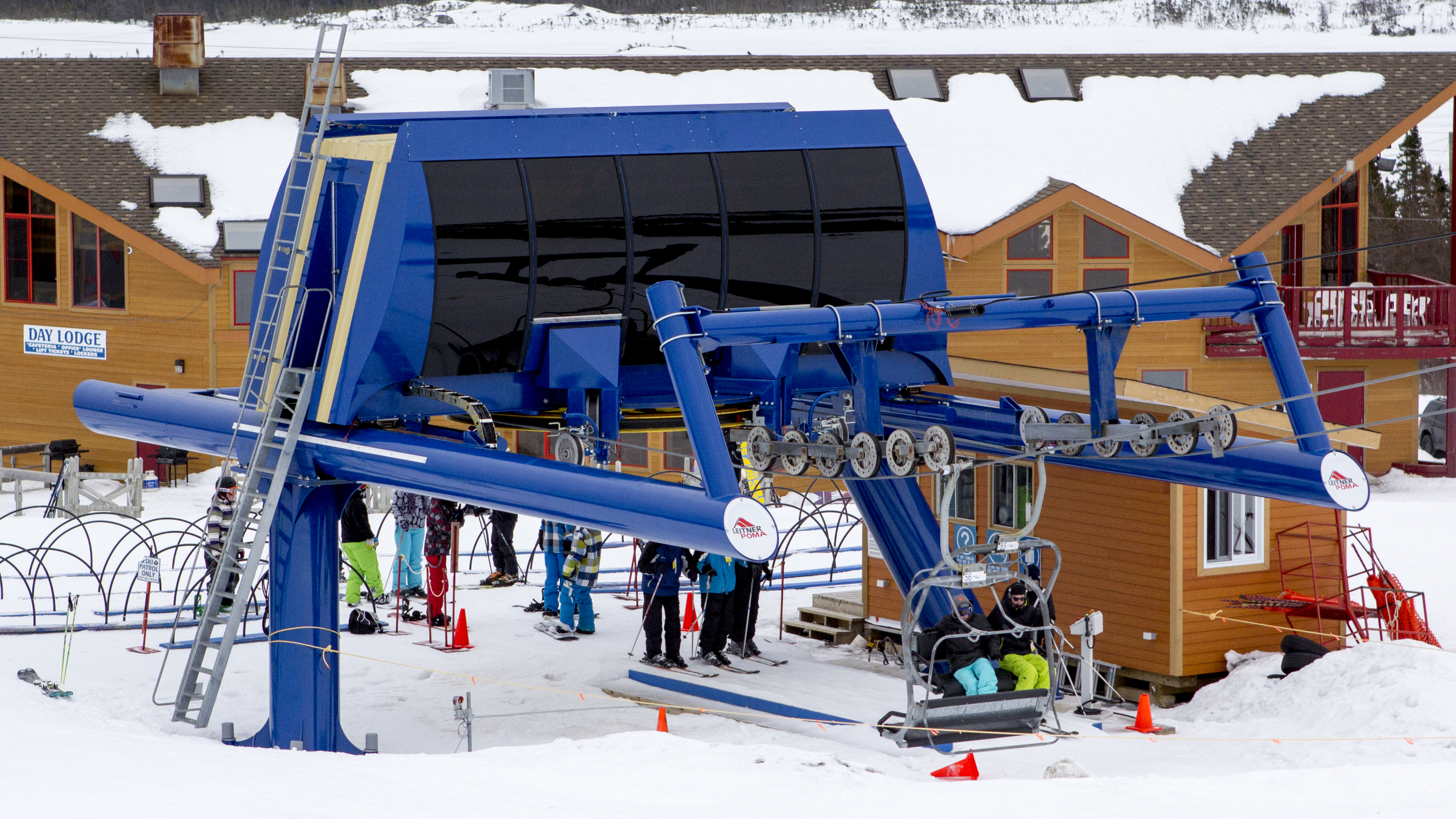
A Poma fixed grip Alpha terminal at White Hills Ski Resort near Clarenville, NL Canada

| Lift Name | Length | Vertical | Type | Ride Time | Make | Build Year |
|---|---|---|---|---|---|---|
| Powder Line Express | Unknown | 230m | Fixed Grip Triple | Approx 10 mins | Leitner-Poma | Unknown (Rebuilt 2011) |
| Magic Carpet | Unknown | Unknown | Surface Lift | Approx 5 mins | N/A | Unknown |
