= Detachable chairlift =

Type of high-speed chairlift

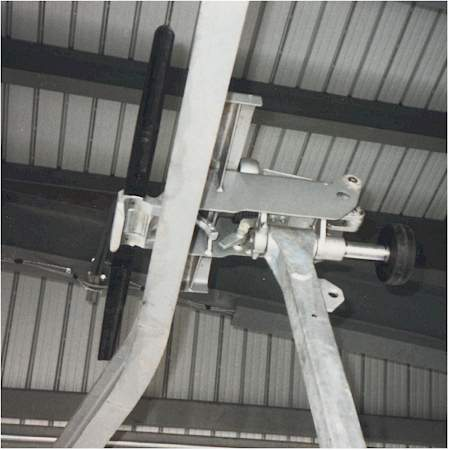
A detachable chairlift grip (note, the chair is on a storage rail). This type of grip is a first generation "Doppelmayr Spring grip", also known as a DS series grip, and can be seen on Doppelmayr detachable lifts built between 1985 and 1995.

Boarding, riding and maintenance of various detachable chairlifts from Doppelmayr in Vorarlberg, Austria

A detachable chairlift, or high-speed chairlift, is a type of passenger aerial lift, which, like a fixed-grip chairlift, consists of numerous chairs attached to a constantly moving wire rope (called a haul rope) that is strung between two (or more) terminals over intermediate towers. In contrast to the fixed-grip version, the chairs of a detachable chair lift detach from the haul rope for loading and unloading.

The significance of detachable chairlift technology is primarily the speed and capacity. Detachable chairlifts move far faster than their fixed-grip brethren, averaging 1,000 feet per minute (10 mph; 20 km/h; 5 m/s) versus a typical fixed-grip speed of 500 feet per minute (6 mph; 9 km/h; 3 m/s). Because the cable moves faster than most passengers could safely disembark and load, each chair is connected to the cable by a powerful spring-loaded cable grip which detaches at terminals, allowing the chair to slow considerably for convenient loading and unloading at a typical speed of 200 feet per minute (2 mph; 4 km/h; 1 m/s)200 ft/min (2 mph, 4 km/h, 1 m/s), a speed even slower than fixed-grip chairlifts.

They are now commonplace at all but the smallest of ski resorts. Some are installed at tourist attractions as well as for urban transportation.

Another advantage of detaching chairs is the ability to remove chairs during severe weather in order to reduce stress on the rope and towers. Furthermore, operating the unladen rope during extreme weather is effective at preventing—or greatly reducing—ice and snow accumulation on the sheaves and rope. This saves considerable time, expense and hazard when opening the chair for operation, which would otherwise require workers to climb each tower and chip away ice and shovel snow.

Chairlifts are made in a variety of sizes, carrying from one to eight passengers. All chairs on a given chairlift usually have the same capacity. Slang terms for the different sizes include "single", "double", "triple", "quad", "six pack", and "eight". Detachable chairlifts may also be described as "high speed" or "express", which results in terms such as "high speed six pack" and "express quad".

Some detachable chairlifts have so-called bubble chairs, which add a retractable acrylic glass dome to protect passengers from weather.

An alternative system for reconciling slow boarding speeds with fast rope speeds is the carpet lift: the chairs move at full speed even through the terminal. Boarding passengers are progressively accelerated on a system of conveyor belts of carpet-like material until nearly matching the chair speed.

On Sunday, 26 December 2004, Lech am Arlberg and Schröcken in the Bregenzerwald, became the first chairlifts to have heated seats when five Doppelmayr detachable chairlifts offer skiers the added luxury of a warm seat on the uphill trip.

== History ==
Doppelmayr built the first detachable quad chair in the world, the Quicksilver SuperChair, in 1981 at Breckenridge, CO. This chair was later replaced by the Quicksilver Super6, a detachable six-person chairlift, by Poma in 1999. Von Roll Habegger installed the "Adirondack Express", a high-speed triple, the only lift of its kind in the Eastern US, at Gore Mountain, NY in 1984. Then Poma built the first chairlift that went 1,100 feet per minute, the Green Mountain Express, at Sugarbush Resort, VT in 1990.

=== Doppelmayr ===
The detachable chairlift didn't start with a chairlift, rather, it started with the Platter lift in 1908, as the sticks left the cable and attached when someone loaded onto the stick. A detachable two-person chairlift called White Lady was installed in Cairngorm Mountain, Scotland in 1961.

In 1981, the first ever high speed detachable quad in the world was installed, the Doppelmayr-built Quicksilver SuperChair at Breckenridge Ski Resort in Colorado. This lift was relocated in 1999 to the Owl's Head Ski area in Quebec as "Le Lac", and was dismantled in 2019 after 38 seasons in two countries. This first detachable chairlift was followed by a Doppelmayr detachable triple chair at Mt Bachelor in Oregon in 1983 and two detachable quads at Mt Buller, Victoria, Australia in 1984.

Until 1985, Quicksilver was also the only detachable quad in Colorado when Vail Ski Resort installed four Doppelmayr high speed quads. In 1988, Vail Ski Resort opened up Orient Express Lift #21, which was the first Doppelmayr chairlift in the U.S. to have rectangular tower heads. The Orient Express was also the first Doppelmayr chairlift in the U.S. to have 800 horsepower. The original grip was slightly modified later before the Vail quads were built. Known as the Spring Series, these grips were known as DS-104 grips on high speed quads and DS-108s on eight passenger gondolas. In 1995, a newer grip was introduced called the Torsion series. Torsion grips were called DT-104 if on a high speed quad, DT-106 on a high speed six pack, or DT-108 on an eight-passenger gondola. The Torsion grip is still made today as Doppelmayr's primary grip option.

Unlike Poma's grips, Doppelmayr grips are double position grips. When the chair enters a terminal, the angled roller is pushed down by a metal strip, which opens a grip jaw. The jaw remains open until the chair reattaches to the cable upon departing the terminal. Grip clamping force is measured just prior to the double position grips reattaching to the haul rope while a carrier (chair) is exiting the terminal, in contrast to Poma's grips, in which grip force can be measured as the grip travels through the contour. Insufficient grip force triggers an alarm and brings the lift to a halt before the carrier reaches the first breakover tower after the terminal. Because of this design, most Doppelmayr detachable lifts are designed to allow operation in reverse. This allows a grip force-alarmed grip and carrier to be backed into the terminal for inspection or removal.

The original terminals on the Quicksilver Quad were all completely enclosed, but in 1985, in time for the Vail Ski Resort high speed quads, the terminal design changed to what is now classified as a CLD-260 terminal. These and the older terminals were the only types of terminals to use chains instead of tires for contours. In 1989, the old design was officially retired with the addition of the Avanti high speed quad at Vail, and a new design, called the UNI, was introduced. This design was utilized from 1989 to the last year of the DS-104 grip in 1994. In 1992, the design was changed slightly mainly in the entry funnels area. With the introduction of the Torsion series came the UNI-M terminal, which underwent a number of minor cosmetic changes between 1995 and 2002. Currently, two options are offered, the UNI-G terminal, and the UNI-GS terminal, which can be distinguished through the appearance of the end windows. The first UNI-GS chairlift, Panorama, debuted in 2003 at Gunstock Mountain Resort.

=== Poma ===
Poma entered this market within two to three years of the (Quicksilver Superchair's) installation. Although hard to prove, the earliest known Poma quads are from circa 1985, such as the (Coney Glade) at Snowmass, the (Liberator Express) at Mission Ridge (installed in 2005, formally known as (Summit Express), ran at Winter Park Resort from 1985 to 2005), and others. Many of the original high speed quads they built were known as Alpha Evolution lifts, because they utilized a Performance terminal with an Alpha drive unit at the far end. These early chairlifts also had vault drives which were located under the Performance terminal. The old (Colorado Superchair) at Breckenridge Ski Resort, and the (American Flyer) at Copper Mountain are two great examples of Performance terminals with vault drives. Very few lifts exist with this style to this day. Later on, the Performance drive terminal was modified to house the bullwheel machinery inside the main terminal structure itself, eliminating the need to run the cable through the terminal. Poma was also slower at introducing tire contours over chains, and it wasn't until 1992 that tire contours were used by the company with the introduction of the Challenger terminal. This terminal would undergo changes with the windows before officially retired in 1998. At that time, the new Omega T-Grip came out and a new terminal known as the Omega was introduced for it. It was replaced by a newer variant that mainly modified the windows on the ends in 2003.

Unlike Doppelmayr, the Poma grips are single position. In such method, they are pressed down, which opens the jaws to detach the chair, and then the jaws close and the spring is released. The process is reversed for attachment. This design allows grip force to be measured as the grip travels through the contour, and for the lift to come to a stop before the grip is reattached to the haul rope if insufficient grip force is detected. Unlike Doppelmayr lifts that check grip force while a grip and carrier are leaving the terminal, most Poma detachable lifts are not built to operate in reverse because a grip force failed grip can be brought to a halt within the terminal.

Poma is also known for building some very unusual lifts, mostly at Breckenridge Ski Resort, which include North America's only double loading chairlift (Quicksilver Super6), the first high speed lift in Colorado with a midway load (Peak 8 SuperConnect), and the highest lift in North America (Imperial Express SuperChair) at 12,840 feet. It also built the new highest high speed six pack as of 2022 in North America (Lenawee Mountain Express), located at Arapahoe Basin, with a peak height of 12,434 feet (3,790 m).

=== CTEC/Garaventa CTEC ===
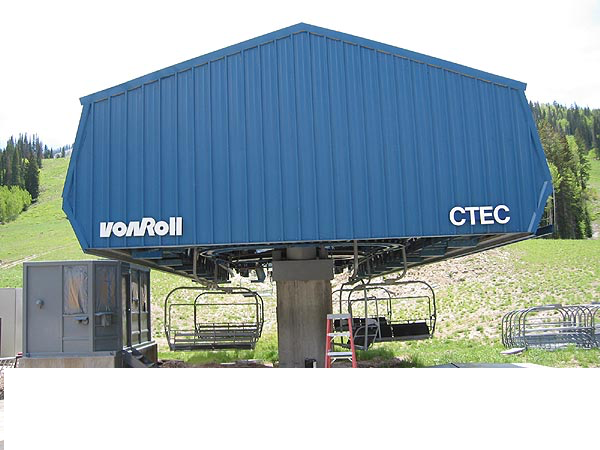
Eagle express at Solitude Mountain Resort.

CTEC built their first detachable in 1989 at Solitude Mountain Resort (named the Eagle express). In building this lift they had a rare partnership with Von Roll for their detachable technology. This also happened to be the first detachable quad in Utah. From 1990 on they partnered with Garaventa for their detachable technology before they merged in 1992. They have built detachable lifts at many resorts, such as Grand Targhee, Stevens Pass, Deer Valley, Park City, Snowbird, Alta, Palisades Tahoe, Stratton, and Attitash. They constructed lifts until 2002 when they merged with Doppelmayr. Some Garaventa designs are used to this day.

=== Lift Engineering/Yan ===
Yan Lift, known in its later years as Lift Engineering, built 31 high speed quads between 1987 and 1994, mostly in the United States and Canada. The detachable grips were of an unusual design, in which a steel bar with V-shaped troughs sat atop the haul rope and were held in place by tensioning assembly with rubber springs. These grips relied more on gravity and friction than raw grip force, and were much weaker than other designs. The grips were notorious for slipping, and often required realignment.

Yan stopped building detachables after two fatal accidents. In 1993, a grip failure stacked two chairs together at Sierra-at-Tahoe, killing a 9-year-old boy. Finally, in 1995, 4 chairs plummeted from Whistler Blackcomb's Quicksilver lift while it was operating. A chair slipped from the steepest part of the lift, creating a domino effect involving 3 others. All four chairs fell 75 feet upon crashing into the sheaves on the nearest tower, killing 2 riders and injuring 8. Yan filed for bankruptcy in 1997 and has not operated since.

== Present ==
=== Leitner-Poma ===
Leitner-Poma is the present day version of Poma, as joint venture in the United States. In Europe, Poma and Leitner operate as separate ventures. They no longer make these types of detachable products: Arceaux Carrier, Arceaux version 2 Carrier, Performance Terminal, Challenger Terminal, Competition Terminal, Leitner Grip, Omega Terminal, and Omega grip. Now, Leitner-Poma has created an improved Omega carrier, along with the new LPA grip, and a new version of the Omega terminal. Leitner-Poma has good relationships with Breckenridge Ski Resort, Vail Ski Resort, Winter Park Resort, Snowmass, Aspen Mountain, Buttermilk, Aspen Highlands, Okemo, Mount Snow, Sugarbush Resort and many other ski resorts.

=== Doppelmayr ===
Doppelmayr (North America), formally known as Doppelmayr CTEC is the merger of CTEC, Garaventa, and Doppelmayr globally. They continue to make Garaventa and Dopplemayr Carriers, their UNI-GS/UNI-G (Europe) terminals, and the Torsion grip today. Doppelmayr in the U.S. is starting to discontinue the Garaventa carriers, and replacing them with Doppelmayr EJ carriers. Doppelmayr is known for building the first high speed quad, building the first 8-passenger gondola at Steamboat Ski Resort and having a good relationship with Big Sky Resort, Vail Ski Resort, Beaver Creek Resort, Steamboat Ski Resort, and many other ski resorts.

=== Bartholet ===
Bartholet is a Swiss maker of chairlifts and gondolas. While they are an important player in the European ski lift market, only a few of their lifts have been installed in Asia and South America. There are currently no Bartholet detachable chairlifts in the United States.

=== MND ===
French MND has a history of Alpine manufacturing. The company formerly partnered with Bartholet for their grip technology. With this technology having been developed in Europe, the company installed their first U.S. system at Waterville Valley New Hampshire. The lift is called the Tecumseh Express, and is a detachable six-person bubble chairlift. In late 2023, Bartholet cancelled its MND partnership when it was purchased by HTI Group (the parent company of Poma, Leitner, Leitner Poma of America and many others). In April of 2024 MND revealed its Orizon line. A new model of Terminals, Grips and carriers. The carriers include a range of comfort chairs from 4 to 6 Place, cabins up to 15 passengers. In mid June 2024 Their prototype model was shown to the public sporting 2 hold-down towers, 1 support tower, a very large cabin and a 6 place chair. These terminals are unique in that they are “gravity assist” where the rails of the terminals slope upward and downward to help slow down and accelerate the carriers.

== See also ==
- List of aerial lift manufacturers
- Skiing
