= Doppelmayr USA =

Aerial lift manufacturer in Salt Lake City

Doppelmayr USA, Inc
- Type: Subsidiary
- Founded: 2002
- Headquarters: Salt Lake City, Utah
- Key people: Keith Johns, president
- Parent: Doppelmayr/Garaventa Group
- Website: doppelmayr.com

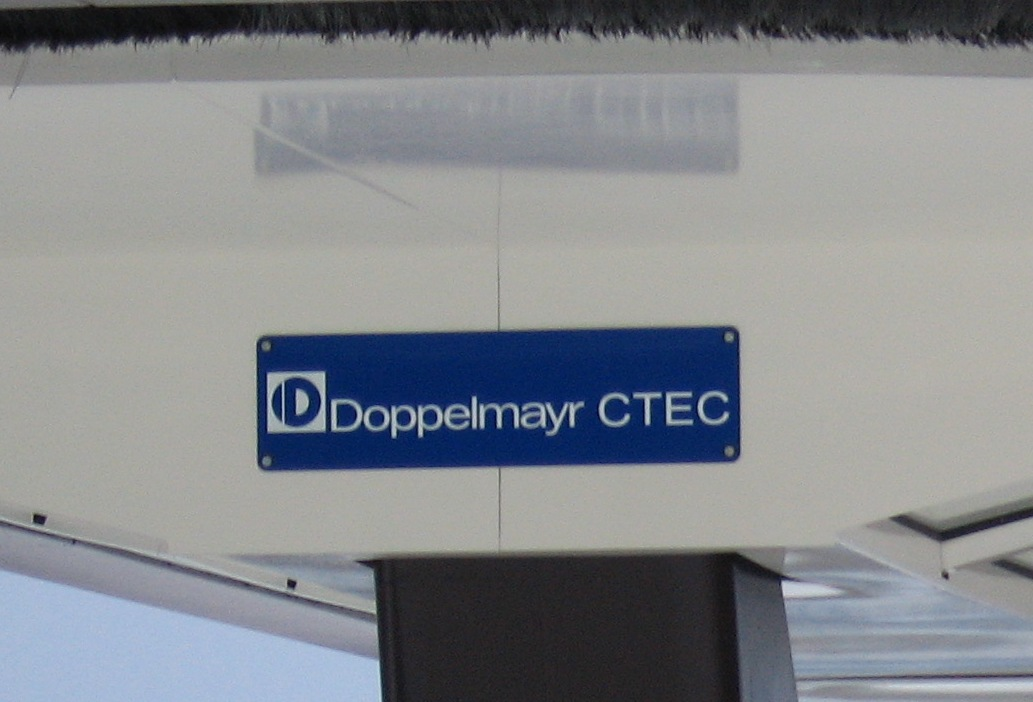
The former Doppelmayr CTEC logo as seen on a lift

Doppelmayr USA, Inc is an aerial lift manufacturer based in Salt Lake City, Utah, and a subsidiary of the worldwide Doppelmayr Garaventa Group. The United States company was formed in 2002 after the merger of Garaventa of Goldau, Switzerland, and Doppelmayr of Wolfurt, Austria. Between 2002 and 2010, the company was named Doppelmayr CTEC. From 2011 the company has operated using the Doppelmayr brand name, in common with most other Doppelmayr Garaventa Group subsidiaries.

== CTEC before merger ==
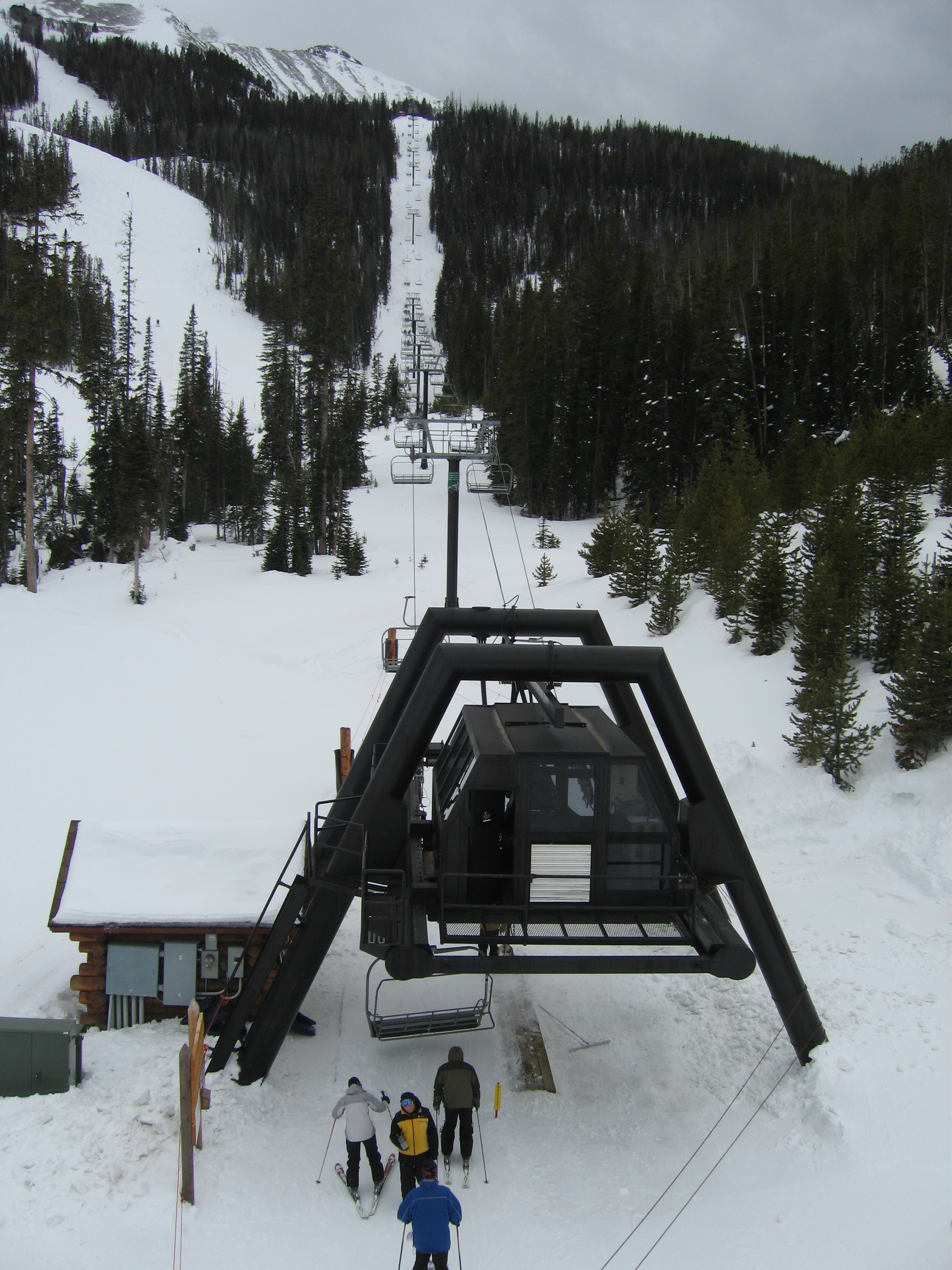
A CTEC chairlift at Big Sky, Montana

CTEC, which stands for Cable Transportation Engineering Company, was the successor to Thiokol, a company which built 41 ski lifts between 1971 and 1977. By 1977, Thiokol had decided to stop producing ski lifts and sold their designs to two employees, Jan Leonard and Mark Ballantyne.

CTEC's first lift produced as an independent manufacturer was at Seven Springs Mountain Resort, Pennsylvania, in 1978. Leonard oversaw engineering at the company's Salt Lake City facility while manufacturing was performed in Sacramento, California, where Ballantyne worked. CTEC slowly grew to become one of three major lift manufacturers in North America along with European-owned Doppelmayr USA and Poma of America. In 1989, CTEC partnered with Von Roll to build its first detachable chairlift at Solitude Mountain Resort, Utah.

From 1990 onwards, CTEC used detachable grips built by the Swiss company Garaventa. In 1992, CTEC and Garaventa merged and the new company was named Garaventa CTEC. Prior to the merger, Garaventa had built only a few lifts in North America, including Aerial Trams at Snowbird, Utah, and Palisades Tahoe, California. The combined company utilized the designs and manufacturing facilities of CTEC since Garaventa never had much of a presence in North America besides supplying parts to CTEC. CTEC's growing reputation combined with the European ownership and parts supply of Garaventa allowed it to win contracts for large lifts such as the Gold Coast Funitel at Palisades Tahoe, California, gondolas at Telluride Ski Resort and Vail Ski Resort, and Steamboat Springs Ski Resort in Colorado, Snowshoe ski resort in West Virginia, and Deer Valley, Utah.

== Doppelmayr USA before merger ==
Doppelmayr was a world-renowned Austrian ropeway manufacturer that began exporting surface lifts to North America in the 1950s under the name "Alpine Lift." The first Doppelmayr chairlift in North America was installed at Marmot Basin, Alberta, in 1968. Doppelmayr's first North American manufacturing facility in Saint-Jérôme, Quebec, opened in 1978.

Unlike its competitors, Doppelmayr used exclusively European designs in North America. The company built the world's first detachable high speed quad chairlift in 1981 at Breckenridge Ski Resort in Colorado.

In 1996, Doppelmayr's European holding company purchased the ropeway department of Von Roll, a Swiss manufacturer which had been making lifts in North America since the mid-1980s. Von Roll owned Hall Ski-Lift, an American company that produced more than 400 lifts from 1960 to 1985. Doppelmayr now controlled all the spare parts sales for Doppelmayr, Von Roll, and Hall brand lifts.

== Merger of Doppelmayr and Garaventa CTEC ==
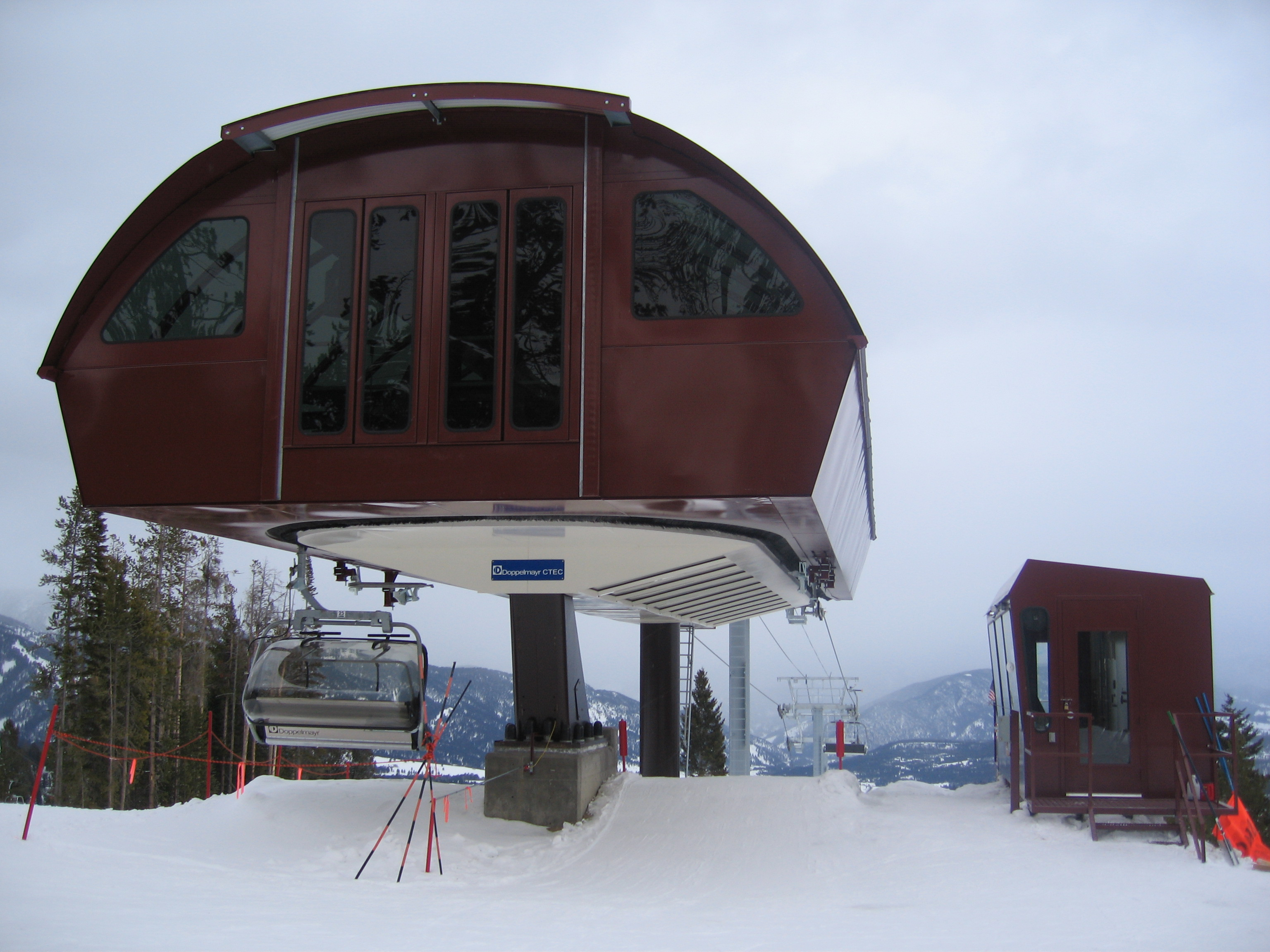
A Doppelmayr CTEC Uni-GS model detachable chairlift at Big Sky, Montana, built in 2005

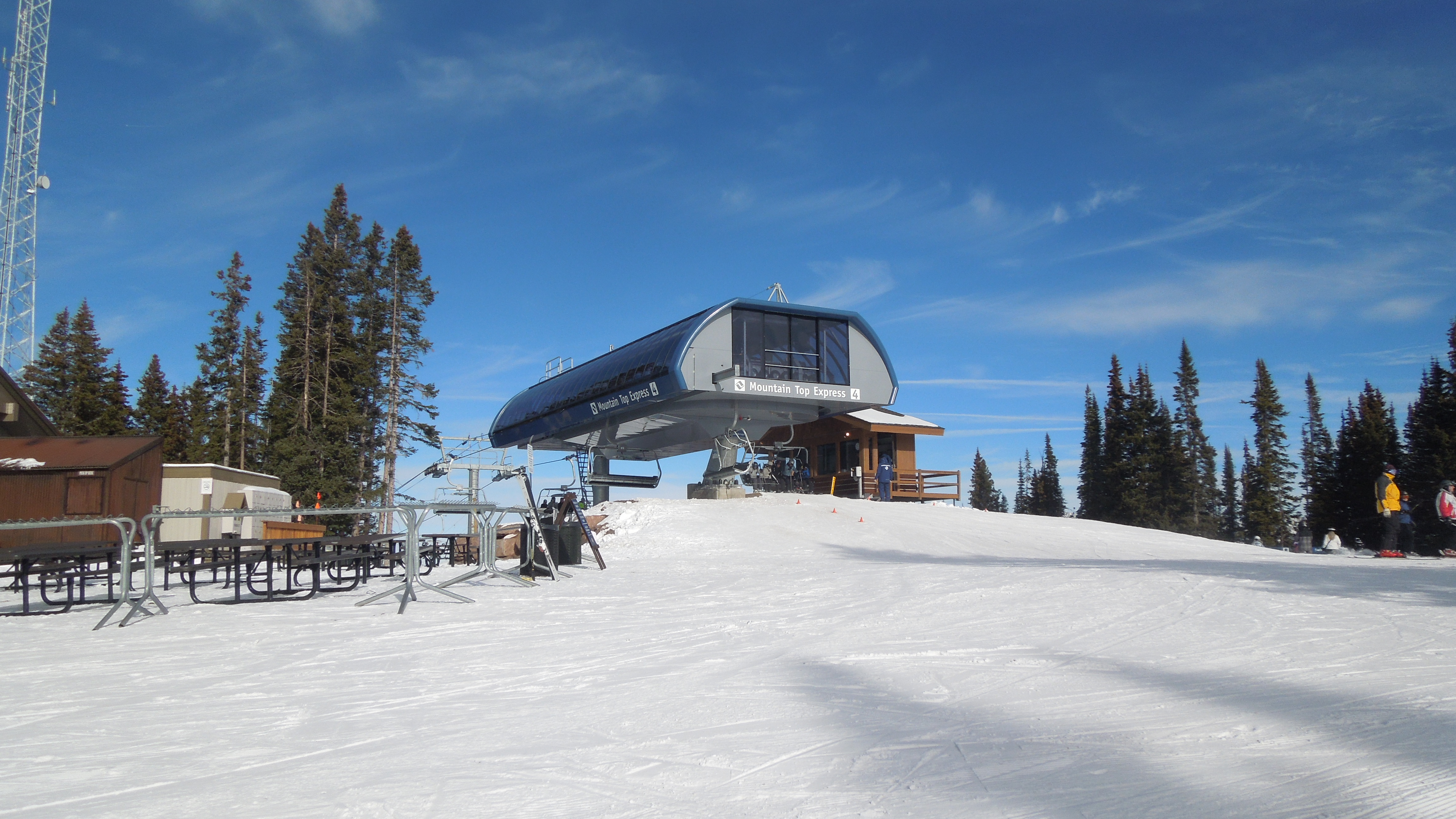
The Mountaintop Express lift at Vail Ski Resort, Colorado, a typical Doppelmayr Uni-G model high-speed six-pack, built in 2013

In 2002, Garaventa of Switzerland merged with Doppelmayr of Austria, forming the world's largest aerial lift manufacturer. The new company would be known as the Doppelmayr Garaventa Group in Europe and Doppelmayr CTEC in North America.

Starting in 2003, Doppelmayr CTEC produced a new line of products that combined the best designs of Doppelmayr and CTEC. The Uni-GS detachable chairlift terminal design was specifically designed for the North American market and incorporated elements of Garaventa CTEC's Stealth line and Doppelmayr's Uni line. Many of CTEC's fixed-grip designs were kept. Today, manufacturing of fixed-grip chairlift terminals and all tower tubes and chairs is done at Doppelmayr CTEC's Salt Lake City factory, while all line equipment and detachable terminals are made in the Quebec plant.

== After the merger ==
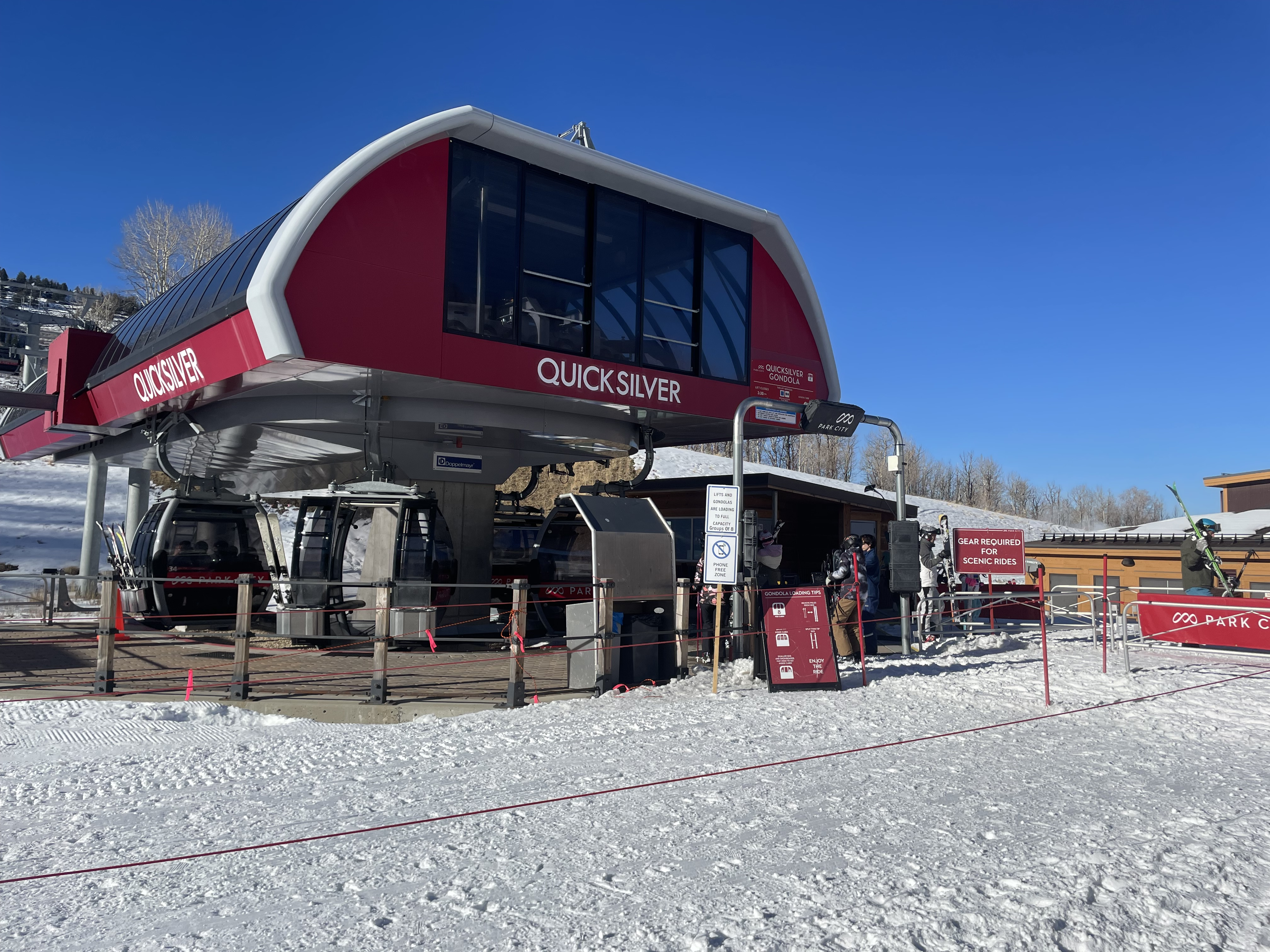
Image of the Quicksilver Gondola, a 2015 Doppelmayr Gondola located in Park City, Utah.

In 2003, the company installed its first UNI-GS detachable chairlift, the Panorama Quad, at Gunstock Mountain Resort in Gilford, New Hampshire.

In 2003, the company was selected to design, fabricate, install and maintain the Portland Aerial Tram at a cost of $57 million.

In 2005, the company purchased Partek, a small chairlift manufacturer based in Pine Island, New York. Also included in the purchase were Partek's rights to Borvig lifts.

Jan Leonard stepped down as president of the company in October 2007 to start a new company, Skytrac Lifts. He was replaced by VP Mark Bee.

In 2007 and 2008, Doppelmayr CTEC constructed two notable lifts at Jackson Hole, Wyoming, and Whistler Blackcomb, British Columbia. The new tram at Jackson Hole cost $31 million and replaced the iconic original Jackson Hole Tram. Whistler Blackcomb's Peak 2 Peak Gondola is the largest lift of its kind in the world, breaking multiple world records and costing CDN $52 million.

In 2019, the company opened the Disney Skyliner at the Walt Disney World Resort in Florida.

=== Notable failures ===
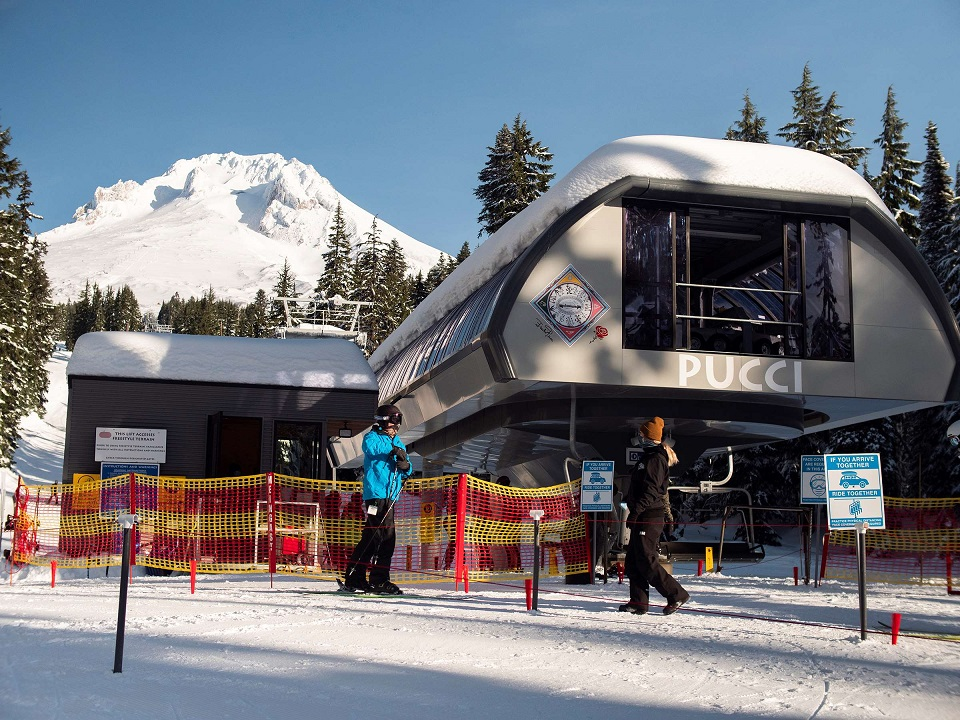
Doppelmayr chairlift at Mount Hood, Oregon, which failed and stranded 42 people in February 2021

In February 2021, the new Pucci chairlift at Timberline Lodge ski area in Mount Hood, Oregon broke down due to an electronic failure causing 42 people to become stranded. The chairlift's auxiliary motor failed to bring down the passengers, and they had to be rescued with ropes.

== See also ==
- List of aerial lift manufacturers
