= Hall Ski-Lift =

American aerial lift manufacturer

Hall Ski-Lift Company, Inc.
- Company type: Public
- Industry: Aerial lift manufacturer
- Founded: 1954
- Fate: merged with Von Roll in 1982
- Headquarters: Watertown, NY
- Products: T-Bars, chair lifts, safety equipment,

Hall Ski-Lift Company was an American manufacturer that built and installed rope tows, t-bar and chair lifts for the ski and resort industry. It was established in Turin, NY in 1954 by Victor E. Hall. Over 800 ski lifts were installed throughout the world and many still operate. In 1982, Hall Ski Lift Company merged with Von Roll, giving up its name.

== Victor E. Hall ==
Hall was born 22 September 1904 in West Colesville, New York. He was schooled in Binghamton public schools. He worked as a machinist, and in 1941 he opened his own radio service shop. During World War II, he supervised the design and installation of many conveyor systems for manufacturing in upstate New York.

Hall was working as a project manager at a large industrial equipment company in Syracuse, New York in 1945 when a friend asked him to help construct and install a rope tow at a nearby ski resort. Using salvaged tractor parts, they constructed Hall's first tow-rope ski lift. This led to the establishment of a side business, Hall Engineering, which constructed and installed rope tows across the northeastern United States.

== Hall Ski-Lift Company Established ==
Hall recognized that the ski industry was entering a growth period. He also recognized that existing lift equipment, consisting of primarily rope tows was inadequate. He identified a good T-bar design developed by the Swiss engineer Ernst ("Ernest") Constam, who by then had relocated to Denver, Colorado. Constam had patented the design in 1947. After Constam's patent expired in 1954, Hall built his own T-bar lift system that incorporated elements of Constam's design. Hall installed his first T-bars at Highmount, and at Snow Ridge in Turin, New York.

Hall Ski-Lifts were popular because of pricing and durability. Over 800 Hall Ski-Lifts sold between 1955 and 1982, ranging from T-Bars to fixed grip quad chairlifts. Many of the Hall Ski-Lifts are still in operation. The last new Hall chairlifts were installed in 1982 at Ski Bittersweet and Timber Ridge Ski Area, both in Michigan.

In 1982 the Hall Ski-Lift Company was bought by Von Roll, which used some of the Hall designs and spare parts. Other Hall design elements have been used by CTEC.

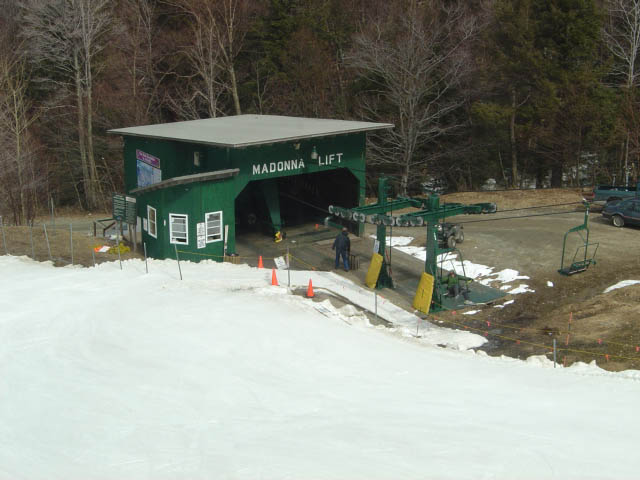
A classic Hall double chairlift at Smugglers' Notch, Vermont
