= Leitner-Poma =

Aerial Lift Manufacturer

Leitner-Poma of America, INC.
- Type: Subsidiary
- Industry: Aerial lift
- Founded: 2000
- Headquarters: Grand Junction, Colorado
- Key people: Daren Cole, President
- Owner: Poma
- Number of employees: 75
- Website: leitner-poma.com

Leitner-Poma of America, known simply as Leitner-Poma, is a United States aerial lift manufacturer based in Grand Junction, Colorado. It is the American subsidiary of French-based Poma, which is owned by the Italian company HTI Group. The North American company was formed in 2000 when the Seeber Group, owner of Leitner, bought Poma and merged both companies' North American subsidiaries. Leitner-Poma of America operates a Canadian subsidiary based in Barrie, Ontario called Leitner-Poma Canada Inc.

Leitner-Poma's only major competitors are Doppelmayr USA, based in Salt Lake City, and Doppelmayr Canada. Leitner-Poma also supplies lifts to Australia and New Zealand.

== Poma of America before merger ==
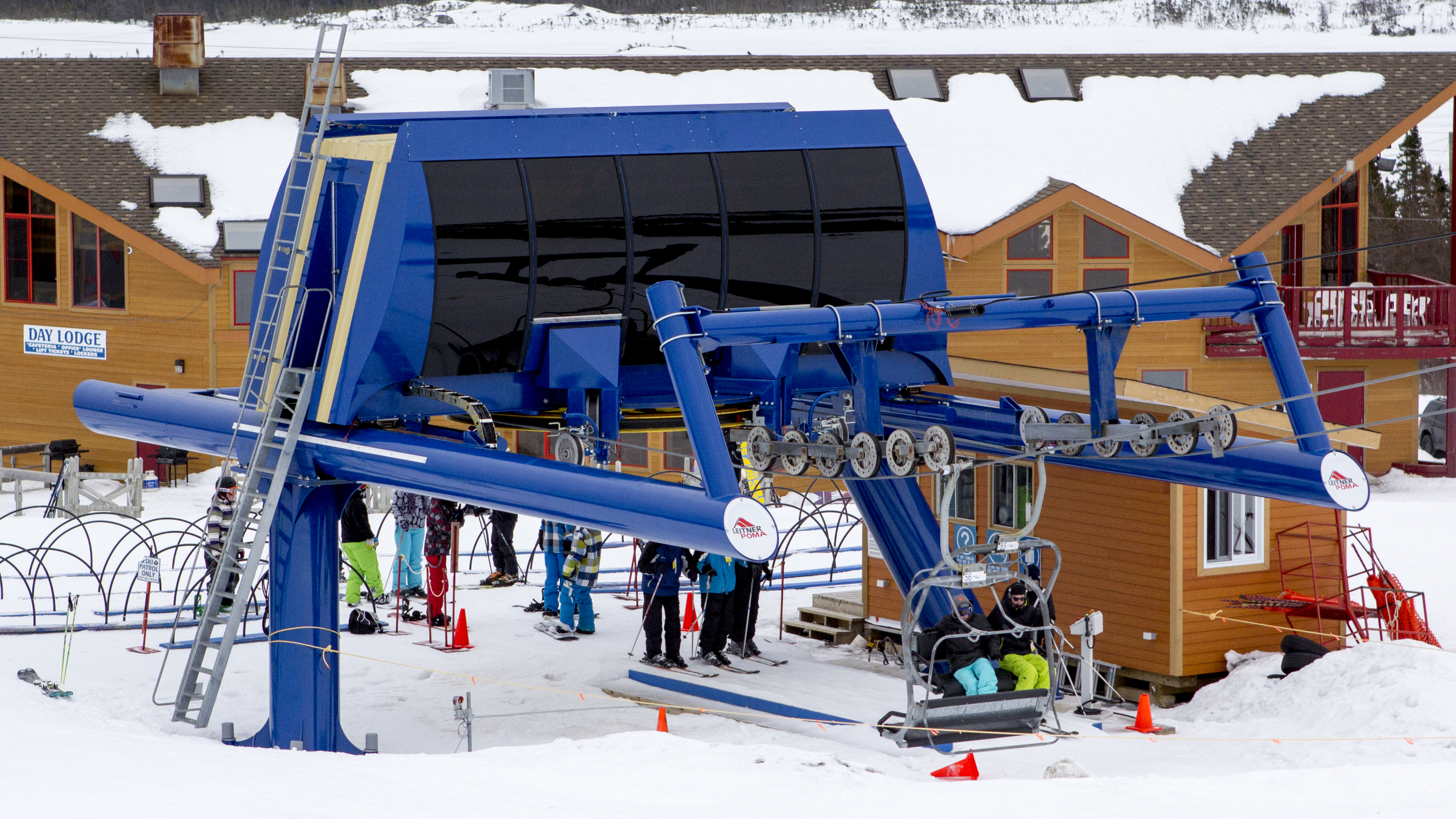
A Leitner-Poma fixed grip Alpha terminal at White Hills Ski Resort near Clarenville, NL Canada

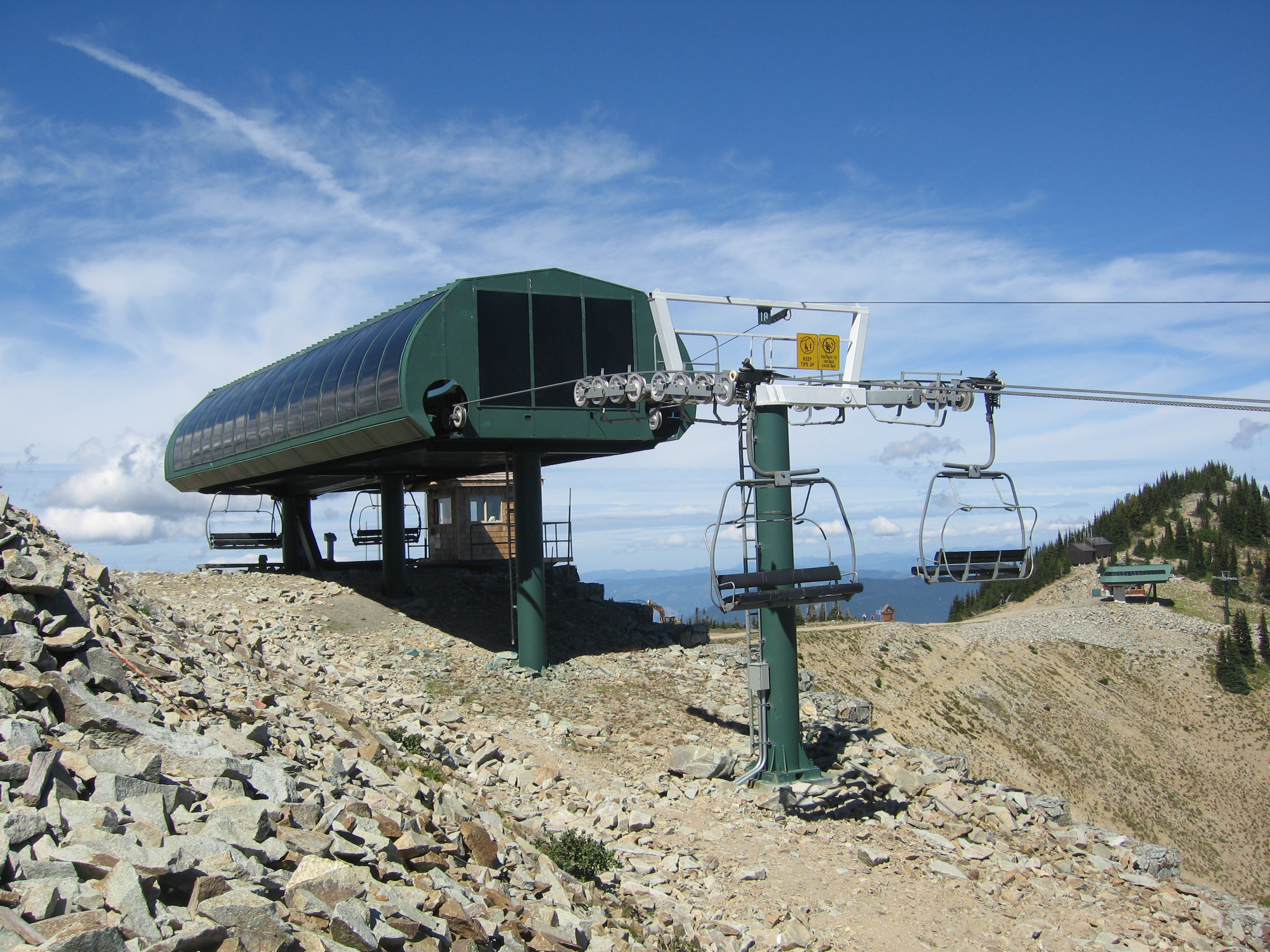
A 1988 Poma high speed quad, the Rainier Express lift, at Crystal Mountain, Washington

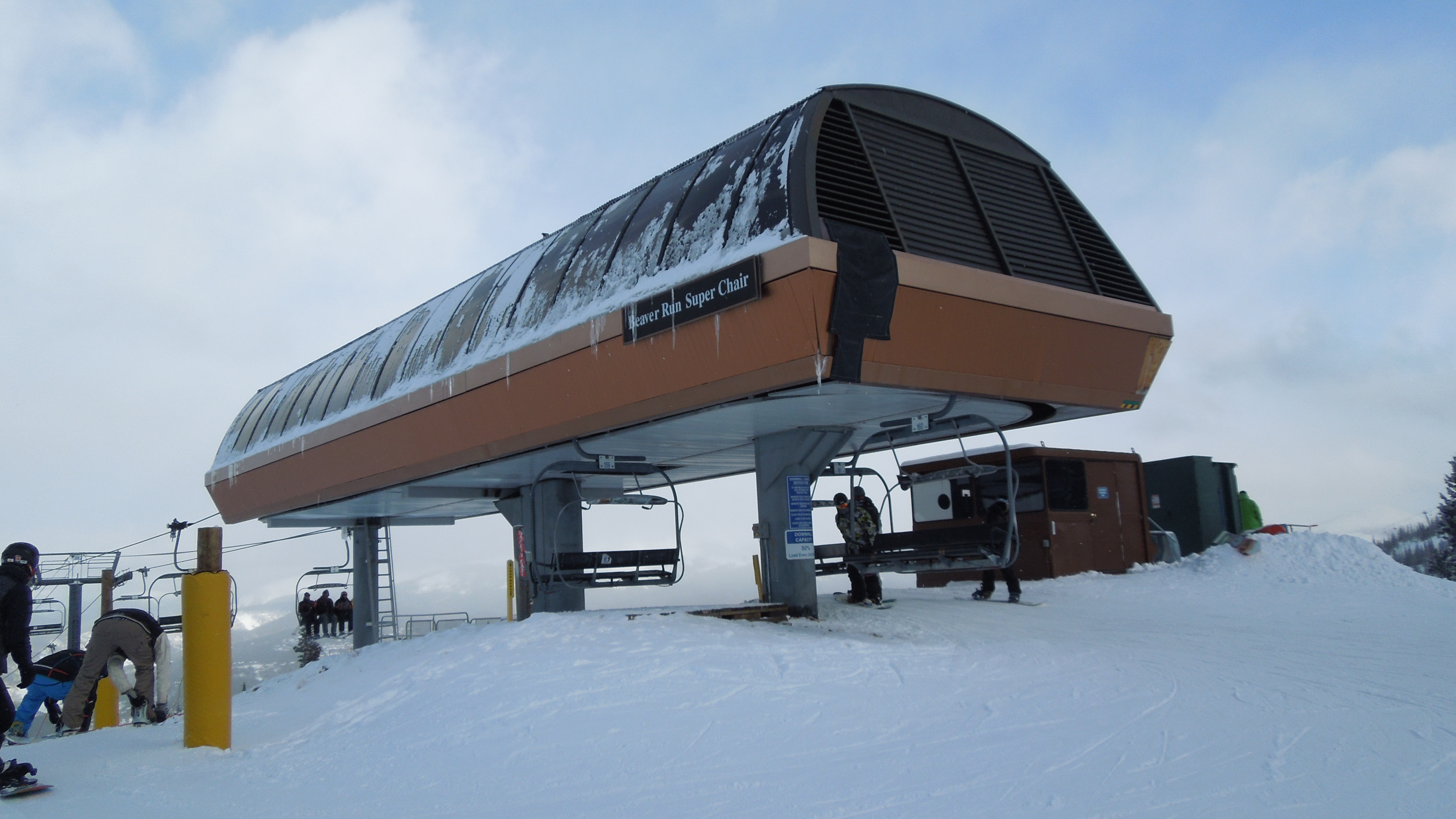
A 1990 Poma high speed quad, the Beaver Run SuperChair at Breckenridge Ski Resort, Colorado

Jean Pomagalski invented the detachable Pomalift surface tow in 1935, and first brought it to North America in 1952. The first North American Poma brand chairlift was installed in 1958 in Squaw Valley, California, for the 1960 Winter Olympics.

Poma's Grand Junction, Colorado, manufacturing facility was opened in 1981 in order for Poma to better serve the North American market.

In 1973, the company built its first Gondola in the United States at Big Sky Resort in Montana (removed in 2008). In the following years, Poma built gondolas at Whistler-Blackcomb, British Columbia; Squaw Valley, California (replaced by North America's only funitel); Stowe Mountain Resort, Vermont; and Stratton, Vermont, among others. In total, the company built 205 chairlifts, surface lifts, and gondolas before merging with Leitner.

=== Designs of Poma of America ===
- Detachable
  - Terminals
    - Alpha evolution
    - Performant
    - Gondola Tripode
    - Competition
    - Challenger
    - Competition Gondola
    - Omega
  - Grips
    - TB-41
    - Double TB-41
    - TB-50 (Double)
    - Omega
  - Carriers
    - Arceaux
    - Competition
    - Omega
- Fixed Grip
  - Terminals
    - Delta
    - Alpha
  - Carriers
    - Arceaux

== Leitner Lifts before merger ==
Leitner had a limited history in North America prior to its merger with Poma of America. Between 1997 and 2001, it installed 21 lifts in the United States and Canada. Customers included Fernie Alpine Resort, Kimberley Alpine Resort, and Big White in British Columbia; Mount Norquay and Lake Louise in Alberta; Granby Ranch, Colorado; and Jay Peak, Vermont.

=== Designs of Leitner in America ===
- Detachable
  - Terminals
    - Automatic
    - Quintessential
    - Plan de Gralba
  - Grips
    - LA48-95
- Fixed Grip
  - Terminals
    - N/A

== Merger of Leitner and Poma ==
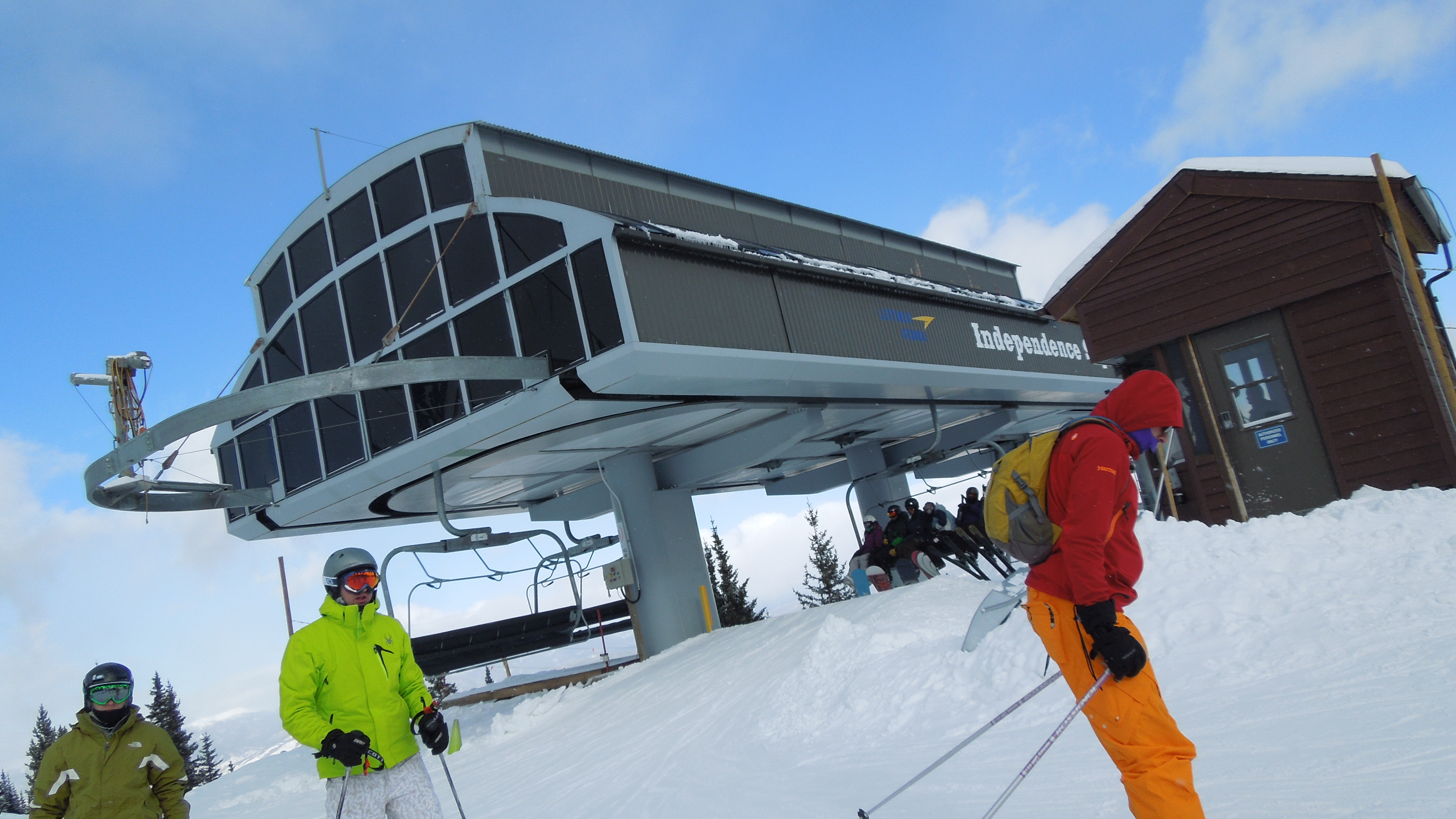
The Independence SuperChair at Breckenridge Ski Resort, a typical high speed six pack

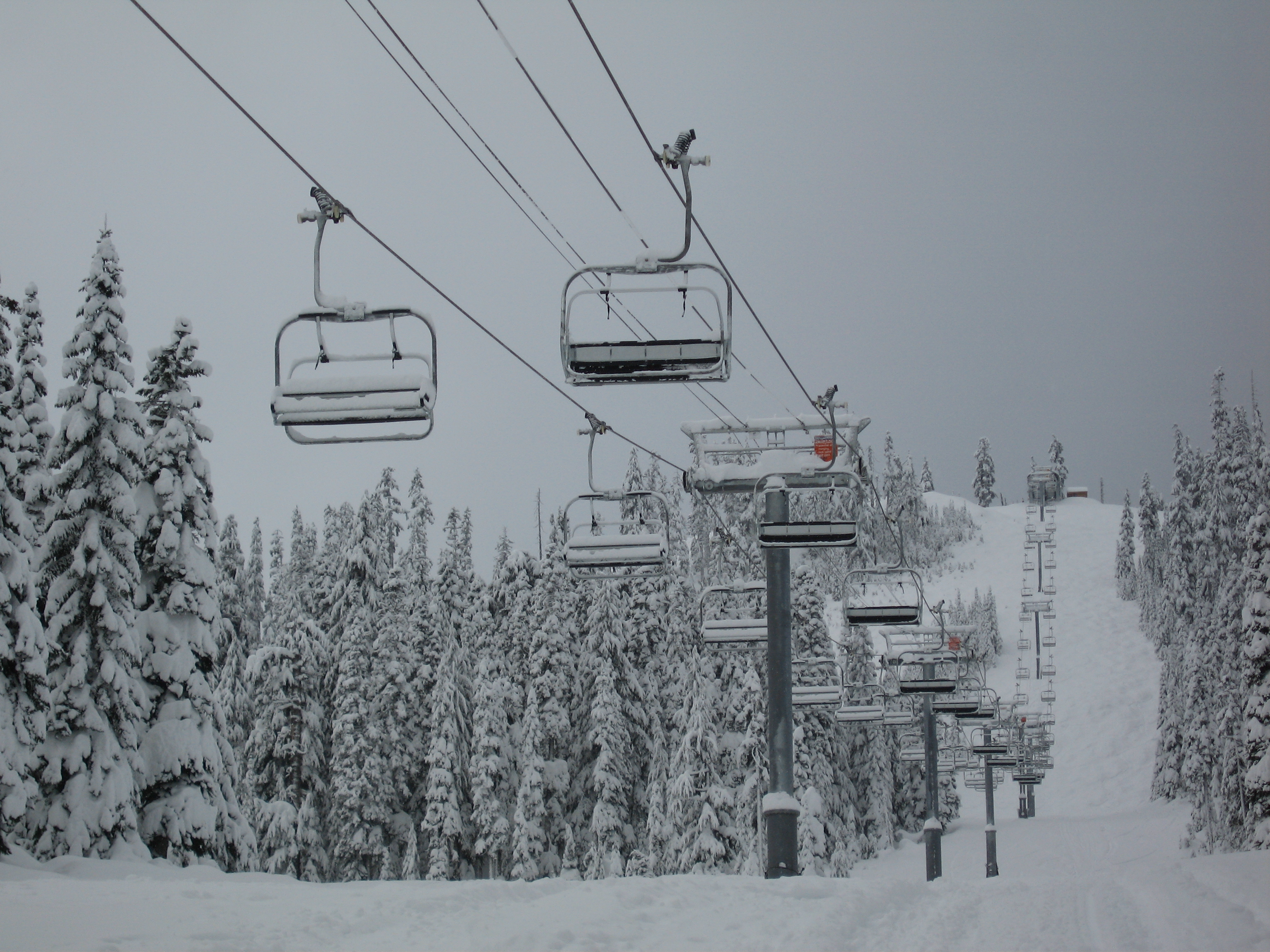
The Silver Fir high speed quad at The Summit at Snoqualmie, Washington

In 2000, the Seeber Group of Italy purchased Pomagalski, S.A. of France. Although the two remained separate in Europe, the North American operations of each were combined. While it was announced as a merger of Leitner Lifts USA/Canada and Poma of America, Leitner's operations were mostly folded into Poma's. The last Leitner designed lifts were installed in 2001, and since 2002, all lifts produced by the company have been of Poma's design.

In 2010, Leitner-Poma adapted the LPA detachable grip, which is cosmetically slightly different from the Omega T-Grip. The terminal design also changed with the introduction of the new grip. The first lift in the United States with the new grip was the High Noon Express at Vail Ski Resort. In 2012, Leitner-Poma adapted a new retro tower design that is a cross of the design of tower heads on Poma chairlifts built in the late 1970s and early 1980s with the design used since 1994.

== After the merger ==
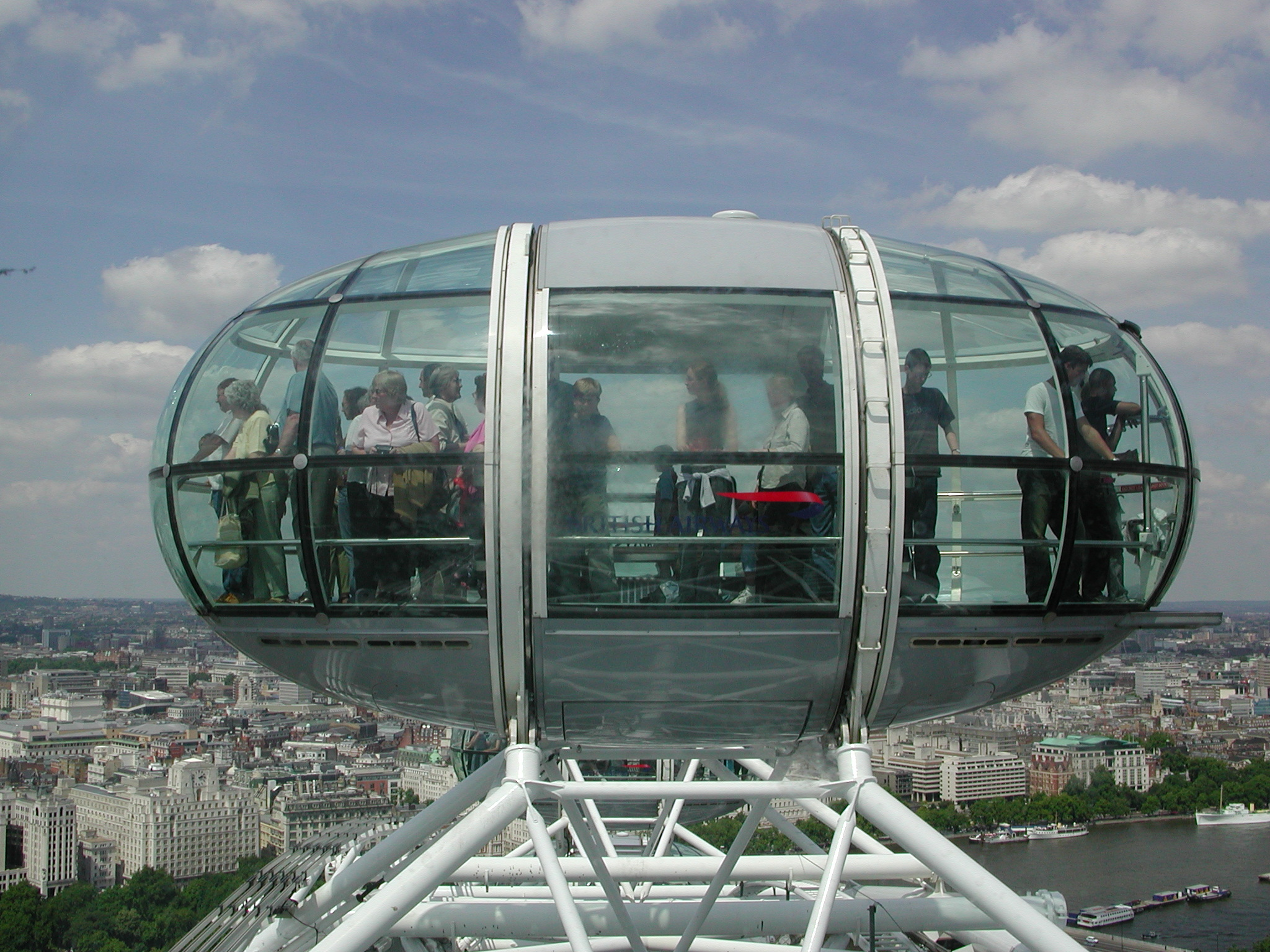
One of the London Eye's 32 passenger capsules

In 2009, Leitner-Poma of America moved into a new headquarters in Grand Junction along with other companies owned by Leitner Technologies, including Leitwind, a manufacturer of wind turbines, and Prinoth, a maker of snow groomers. Colorado Governor Bill Ritter attended the grand opening ceremony, which took place during the 2008 financial crisis at which Leitner-Poma promised to create 100 new jobs.

The company recently won the contract to build the replacement Roosevelt Island Tramway in New York City, and is also the supplier of the passenger capsules for both the London Eye Ferris wheel in England and the High Roller Ferris wheel to be built on the Las Vegas Strip.

As both Poma and as Leitner-Poma, the company has built some of the most notable lifts in America, including, among others, the only double-loading chairlift in North America (Quicksilver Super6) and the highest chairlift in North America, Imperial Express SuperChair (topping at 12,840 feet (3,910 m)), both located at Breckenridge Ski Resort in Colorado.

In 2016 Leitner-Poma had acquired Skytrac, a Utah-based competitor.

=== Designs after the merger ===
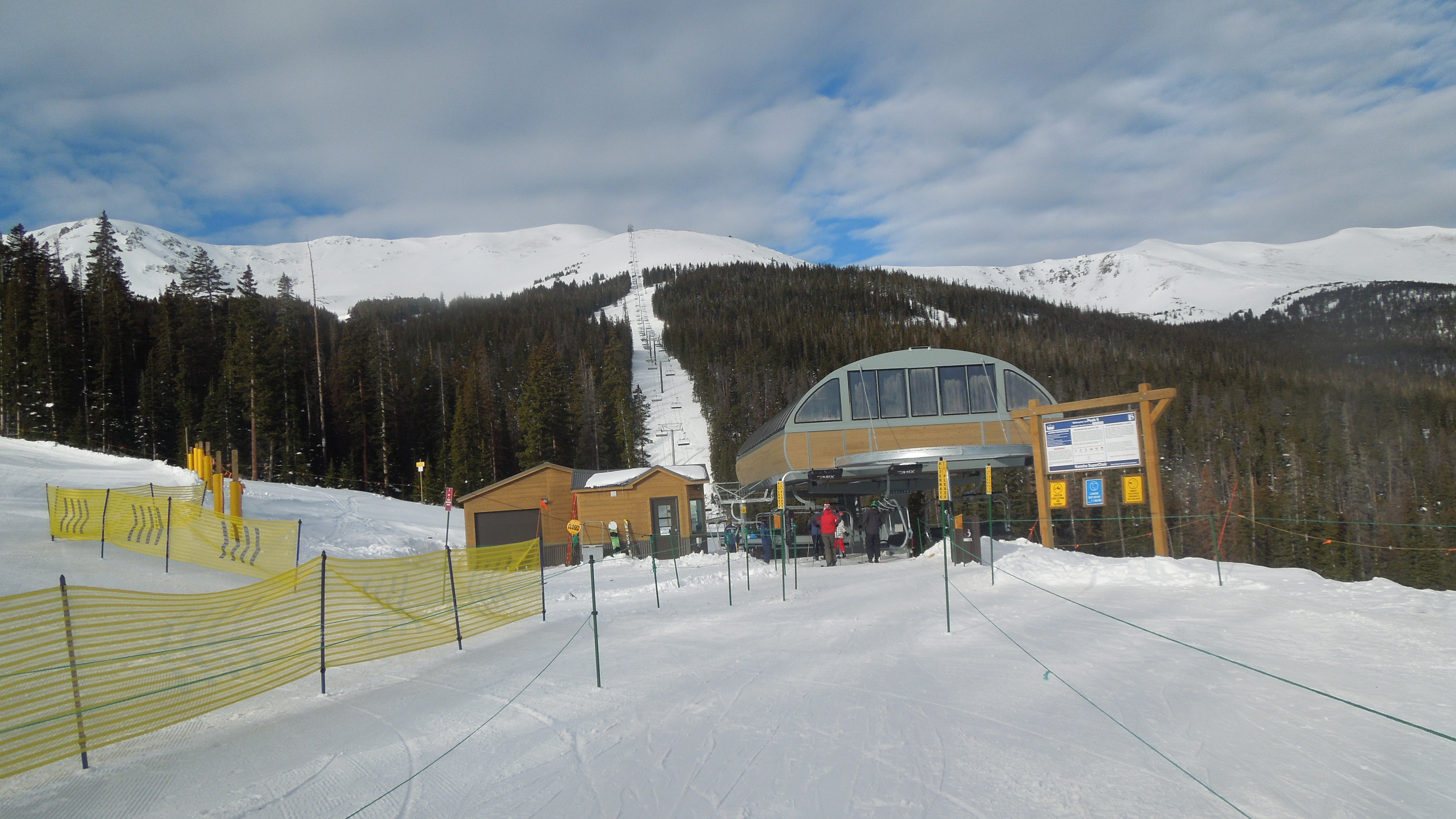
The Kensho SuperChair at Breckenridge Ski Resort is one of a number of new Leitner-Poma lifts with the LPA design

Immediately following the Leitner-Poma merge, there were no noticeable aesthetic changes in the designs of the chairlifts, as all lifts built until 2010 utilized the Omega T-Grip and terminal. The first noticeable changes were when the LPA grip and terminal were introduced in 2010, replacing the Omega grip. Also, a new tower design was introduced in 2012, replacing a design used since 1994.

- Detachable
  - Terminals
    - Omega Terminal (1998–2011)
    - LPA Terminal (2010–current)
  - Grips
    - Omega T-Grip (1998–2011)
    - LPA Grip (2010–current)
  - Carriers
    - Omega Carrier (rarely used as of 2015. examples: Northern Express @ Hunter Mountain (installed in 2018) and Hudson @ Gore (installed in 2024))
    - LPA Carrier
- Fixed Grip
  - Terminals
    - Alpha Terminal (Drive)
    - Z-Type (Return)
    - N/A (Return)
  - Carriers
    - Omega Carrier

== Skytrac ==
Skytrac Lifts, Inc, known as Skytrac, is an American aerial ropeway engineering, manufacturing and installation company located in Salt Lake City, UT. Since its founding in 2010, Skytrac has focused on the North American majority market of new fixed-grip installations. They also provide modification and retrofitting services to the aging chairlift segment of the ski, chairlift transportation and amusement ride industries.

Leitner-Poma purchased Skytrac in April 2016. This acquisition gives Leitner-Poma a stronger presence in the fixed-grip and retrofit market in North America.
