= Bloomington =

Bloomington commonly refers to:

- Bloomington, Illinois, a city in McLean County, United States
- Bloomington, Indiana, a city in Monroe County, United States
- Bloomington, Minnesota, a city in Hennepin County, United States

Bloomington may also refer to:

== Places ==
=== United States ===
- Bloomington, California
- Bloomington, Idaho
- Bloomington, Kansas
- Bloomington, Maryland
- Bloomington, Missouri
- Bloomington, Nebraska
- Bloomington, New York
- Bloomington, Ohio
- Bloomington, Texas
- Bloomington, Utah
- Bloomington (Louisa, Virginia), a historic house
- Bloomington, Wisconsin
- Bloomington (town), Wisconsin
- Bloomington Township, McLean County, Illinois
- Bloomington Township, Indiana
- Bloomington Township, Decatur County, Iowa
- Bloomington Township, Muscatine County, Iowa
- Bloomington Township, Kansas
- Bloomington Township, Buchanan County, Missouri
- New Bloomington, Ohio

=== Canada ===
- Bloomington, Nova Scotia
- Bloomington, Stormont-Dundas-Glengarry, Ontario, in North Stormont
- Bloomington, York Region, Ontario

== Other ==
- Bloomington (album), a 1993 Branford Marsalis live album
- Bloomington (film), a 2010 film

== See also ==
- Bloomfield (disambiguation)
- Bloomington Thunder (disambiguation)
- Bloomington–Normal, a metropolitan area
