= Sheba (disambiguation) =

Sheba is a south Arabian kingdom mentioned in Biblical scriptures and the Qur'an. Sheba may also refer to:

== People ==
- Sheba Chhachhi, Indian artist
- Sheba Deireragea (born 1986), Nauruan weightlifter
- Sheba Hargreaves, American writer
- Sheba Karim, American author

== Religious and historical references ==
- Saba (sura) (Arabic: Sheba), 34th sura of the Qur'an
- Seba (biblical figure)
- Sheba son of Bichri, a biblical character

== Places ==
- 1196 Sheba, an asteroid
- Saba, an island in the Dutch Caribbean

== Arts, entertainment, and media ==
=== Fictional characters ===
- Sheba (Golden Sun character)
- Lieutenant Sheba, a character from Battlestar Galactica

=== Films ===
- Sheba (film), a 1919 silent film
- Come Back, Little Sheba (1952 film)
- Sheba, Baby (1975), blaxploitation film starring Pam Grier and Austin Stoker.

=== Music ===
- "Sheba" (song), a 1980 song by Mike Oldfield

=== Publishing ===
- Sheba Feminist Press, a UK women's liberation movement publishing co-operative (1980–1994)

== Palaces ==
- Queen of Sheba's Palace (disambiguation)

== Other uses ==
- Sheba (cat food), a brand of cat food
- HMS Sheba, a former Royal Navy base in Aden, Yemen
- Sheba Medical Center, a hospital in Ramat Gan, Israel
- Surface Heat Budget of the Arctic Ocean (SHEBA), an acronym for a National Science Foundation-funded research project
- شيبة, sometimes spelled shiba, sheeba or chiba, the Moroccan Arabic word for the plant Artemisia arborescens used in the Maghrebi mint tea

== See also ==
- Chiba (disambiguation)
- Queen of Sheba (disambiguation)
- Shiba (disambiguation)
- Shebaa (disambiguation)
  - Shebaa Farms, a disputed area between Israel, Lebanon, and Syria
- Shiva (disambiguation)
- Shva (ְ), a vowel in the Hebrew language
