= Anne Shannon Monroe =

American writer, lecturer

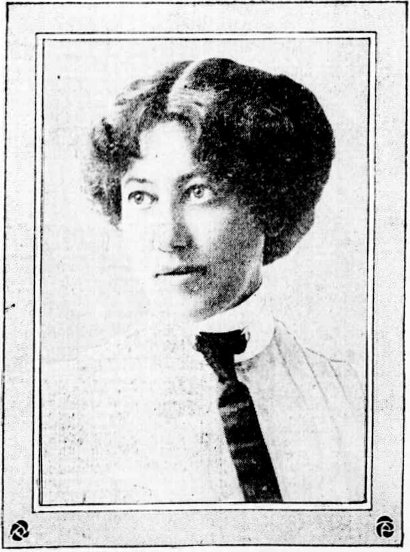
- Born: October 29, 1873; Bloomington, Missouri
- Died: October 18, 1942 (aged 68); Oswego, Oregon
- Occupations: Writer, lecturer
- Notable work: Feelin' Fine

Anne Shannon Monroe (October 29, 1873 – October 18, 1942) was an American author and lecturer.

== Early life ==
Anne Shannon Monroe was born in Bloomington, Missouri, the daughter of William Andrew Monroe (1842-1889), M.D., and great-granddaughter of George Shannon of the Lewis and Clark Expedition. She had four siblings: Louise Harrison Walton (1868-1940), Andrew Monroe (1872-1924), Margaret Monroe (1879-1938), Mary Elizabeth Story (1883-1953).

She moved with the family to Yakima, Washington where her father started a medical practice. After the death of her father, the family moved again to Tacoma, Washington.

== Career ==
Monroe started as a teacher in 1899 in Tacoma, but she soon moved to Chicago, Illinois, to try her hand as a writer. Her first book, Eugene Norton: A Tale of the Sagebrush Land, was published in 1900 by Rand McNally. She worked for six years as editor of Common Sense at the Chicago Daily News. After that she returned to the West Coast and from 1907 to 1911 she managed her own advertising office in Portland, Oregon.

She wrote popular press articles on a wide variety of subjects, including an early portrayal of a (fictional) female business tycoon and a notable 1904 study of Mary MacLane's literary inspiration (which Monroe found in Sei Shonagon's work). Many of her books are based on her childhood experiences growing up in the semi-arid, cold ranch-lands of eastern Washington state.

In 1911 she moved to New York City and contributed to The Saturday Evening Post, Good Housekeeping, Ladies' Home Journal and other magazines. In 1913 she moved back to Oregon where she bought 300-acre homestead for 16 dollars.

Monroe travelled extensively and spoke frequently before women's clubs, chambers of commerce, colleges, schools and churches. She was a member of the Authors' League of America and Pen and Brush, New York. Her most successful book was the 1930 biography of Oregon rancher Bill Hanley, Feelin' Fine, of which Monroe was the ghost-writer.

== Selected works ==
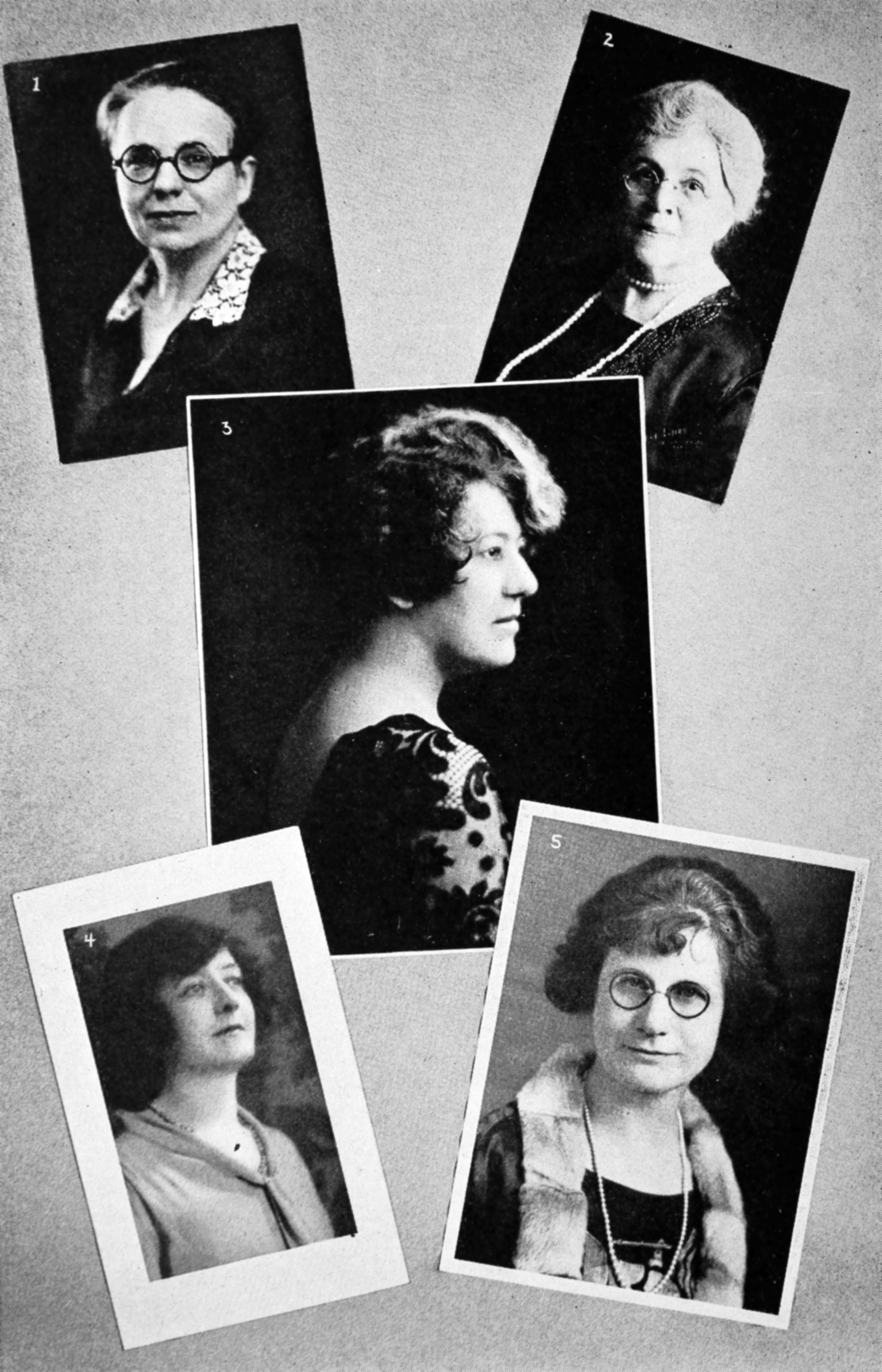
Women of Oregon: 1) Sheba Hargreaves, 2) Eva Emery Dye, 3) Anne Shannon Monroe, 4) Kay Cleaver Strahan, 5) Edith Knight Hill (Marian Miller)

- Eugene Norton: A Tale from the Sagebrush Land (1900)
- Making of a Business Woman (1912)
- Happy Valley - A Story of Oregon (1916)
- Behind the Ranges (Doubleday, 1925)
- Singing in the Rain: Essays for Thoughtful People (1926)
- The world I saw (1928)
- The hearth of happiness (1929)
- Feelin' fine! (1930)
- God lights a candle: it illumines your way to success and happiness (1933)
- Walk With Me, Lad (1934)
- Mansions in the Cascades (1936)
- Sparks from home fires (1940)

== Personal life ==
She lived at 5906 42nd Street, S. E., Portland, Oregon and then at 16600 Bryant Road, Lake Grove, Oregon, for more than 30 years.

She died on October 18, 1942, and is buried at Wilhelm's Portland Memorial Funeral Home, Portland.
