= Cementon =

Cementon may refer to a location in the United States:

- Cementon, New York, a census-designated place
- Cementon, Pennsylvania, a census-designated place
