= Catskill (town), New York =

Town in New York, United States

Catskill, New York
- Town
- Seal

- Location in Greene County and the state of New York.
- Coordinates: 42°13′16″N 73°51′59″W
- Country: United States
- State: New York
- County: Greene

Government
  - Type: Town Council
  - Town Supervisor: Dale Finch
  - Town Council: Members: • Robert C. Antonelli (R); • Patrick McCullogh (D); • Jared Giordiano (R); • Paul Vosburgh (R)

Area
  - Total: 64.17 sq mi (166.19 km^{2})
  - Land: 60.44 sq mi (156.54 km^{2})
  - Water: 3.73 sq mi (9.65 km^{2})

Population (2020)
  - Total: 11,298
  - Density: 186.93/sq mi (72.173/km^{2})
- Time zone: UTC−5 (Eastern (EST))
  - Summer (DST): UTC−4 (EDT)
- ZIP Codes: 12414 (Catskill); 12451 (Leeds); 12463 (Palenville); 12482 (South Cairo); 12413 (Cairo)
- FIPS code: 36-039-13013
- Website: townofcatskillny.gov

Catskill is a town in the southeastern section of Greene County, New York, United States, and is the county seat of Greene County. The population was 11,298 at the 2020 census, the largest town in the county. The western part of the town is in the Catskill Park. The town contains a village, also called Catskill. The village of Catskill has a well-defined Main Street. There is a public boat launch on the Hudson River called Dutchman's Landing.

== History ==
The first settler was Derrick Teunis van Vechten, who built a house there in 1680. The town was established on March 7, 1788, as part of Albany County. When Greene County was formed on March 25, 1800, Catskill became part of the new county. The town was increased by an addition from the town of Woodstock in 1800, but was later decreased upon the formation of the towns of Cairo (1803) and Athens (1815). Catskill is the location of the story "Rip Van Winkle" by Washington Irving.

On July 23, 2003, an F2 tornado ripped across the town. The worst of the damage occurred at the Kiskatom flats. The tornado crossed over New York Route 32 and went past the Friar Tuck Inn, causing two mobile homes to flip over.

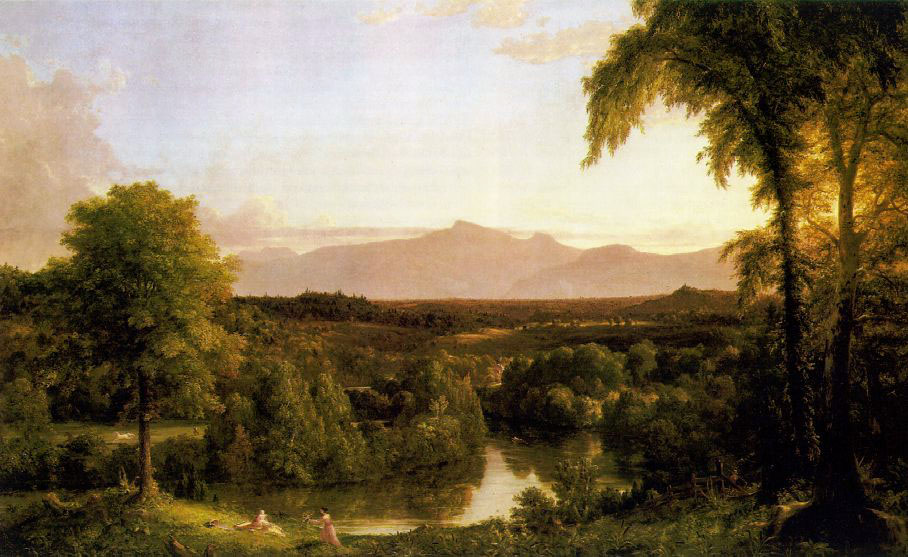
Thomas Cole, View on the Catskill, Early Autumn, 1837

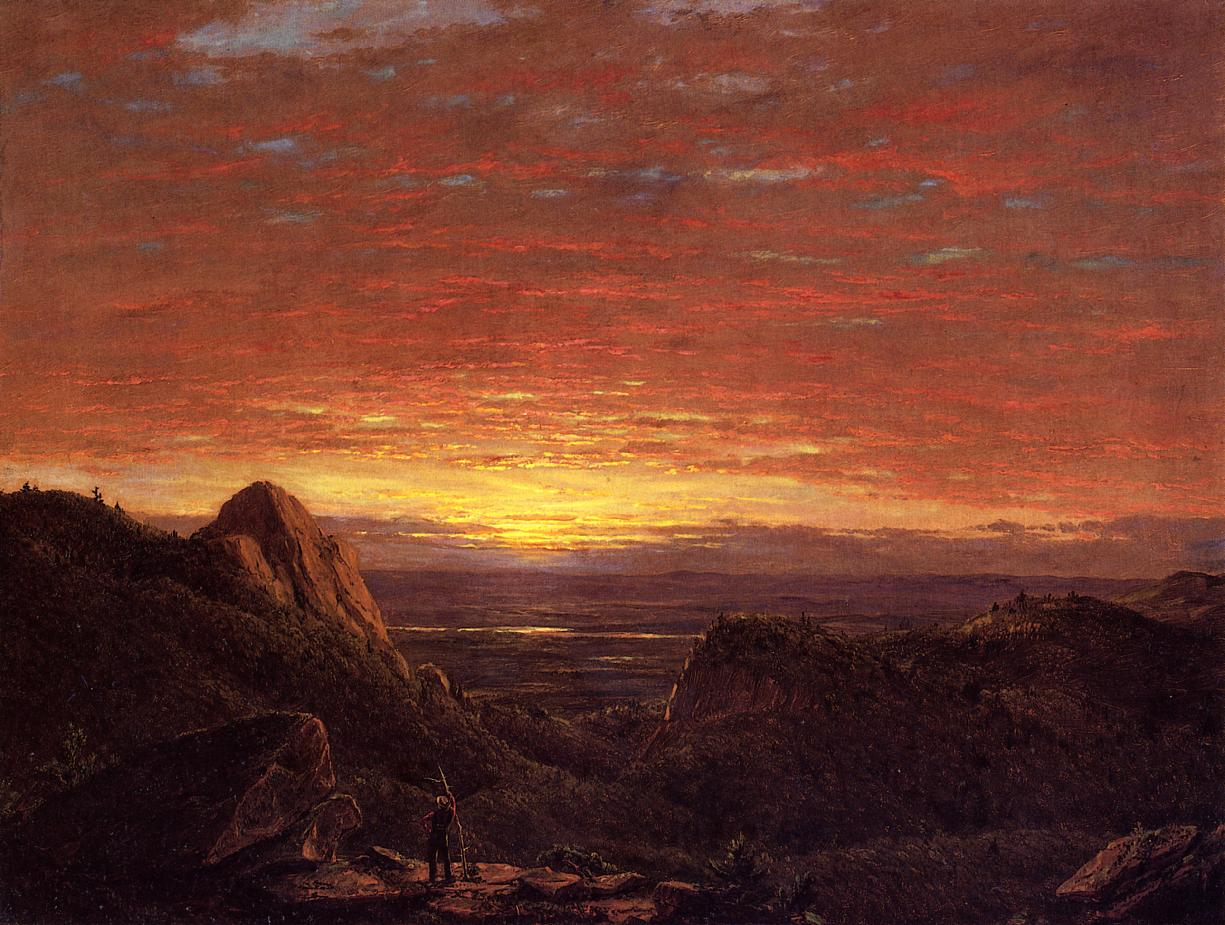
Frederic Edwin Church, Morning, Looking East over the Hudson Valley from Catskill Mountains, 1848

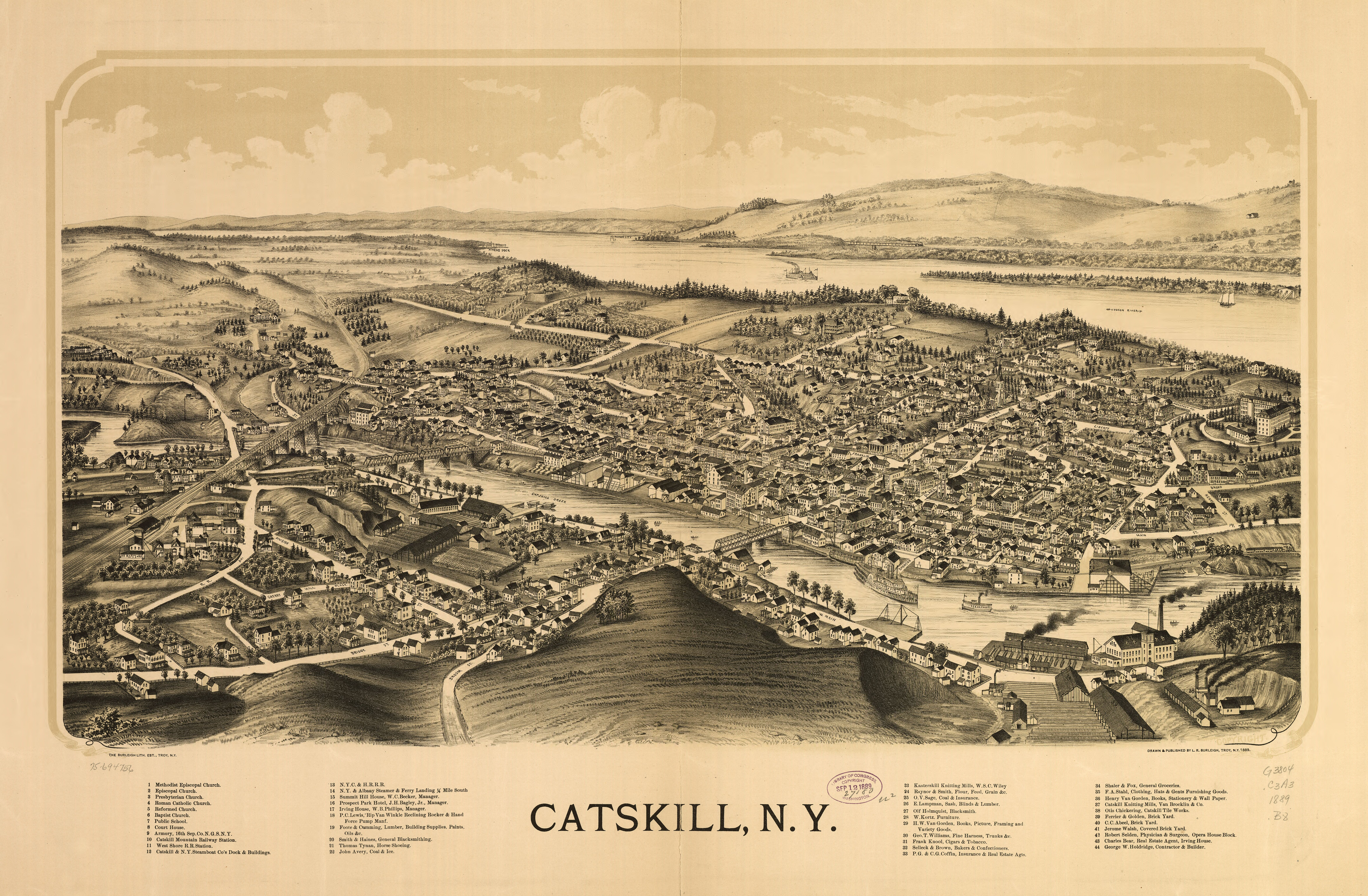
Perspective map of Catskill from 1889 by L. R. Burleigh with list of landmarks

== Geography ==
According to the United States Census Bureau, the town has a total area of 64.2 square miles (166.2 km^{2}), of which 60.5 square miles (156.8 km^{2}) is land and 3.7 square miles (9.5 km^{2}, or 5.69%) is water.

The eastern town line is defined by the Hudson River, forming the border with Columbia County. The southern town line is the border of Ulster County. The Town is bordered by the town of Athens on the north, Cairo to the northwest, Hunter to the west, and Saugerties to the south.

=== Communities and locations in the Town of Catskill ===
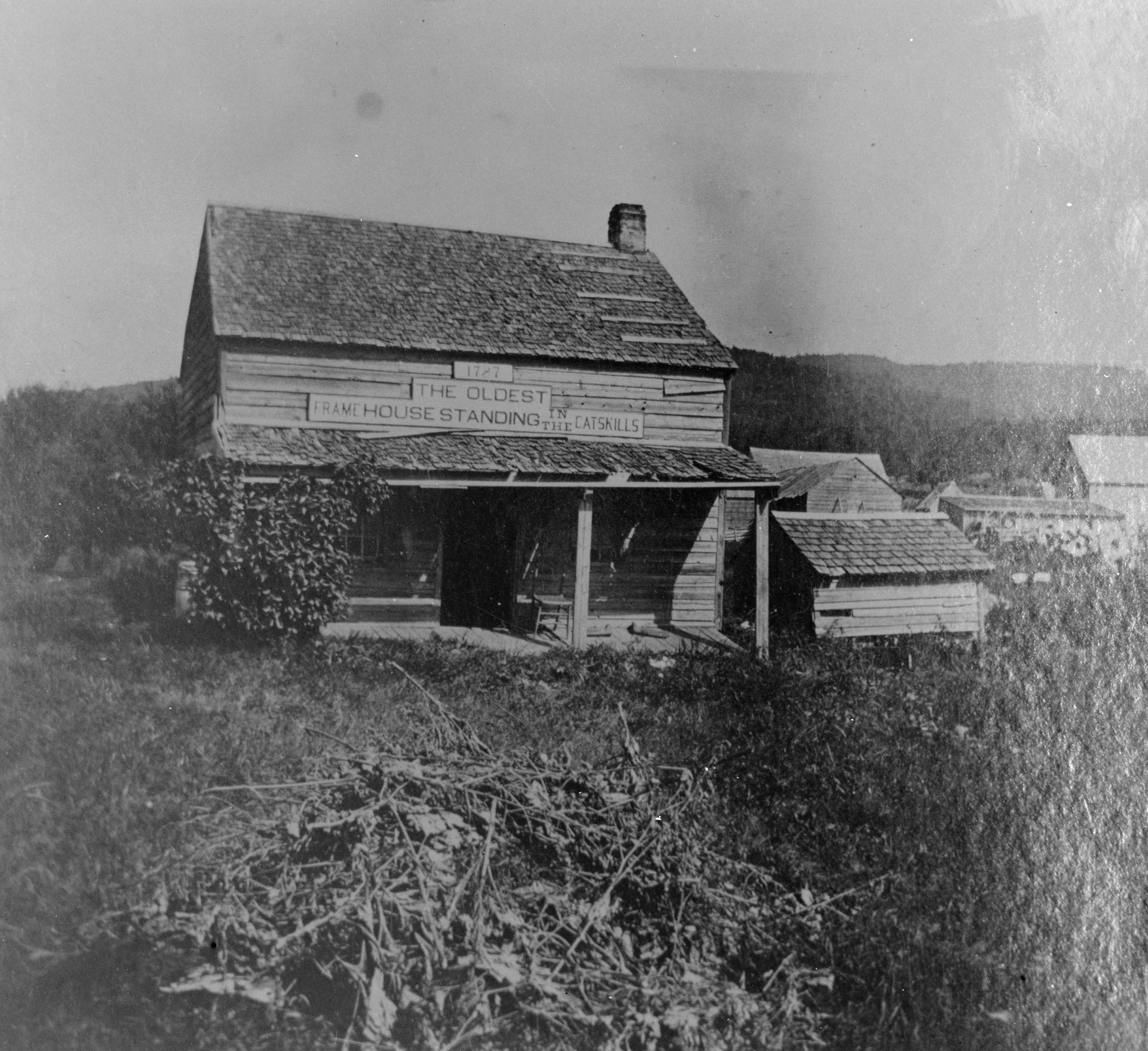
Rip Van Winkle House (built 1787) in Palenville

- Alsen – A hamlet in the southeast part of the town on Route 9W.
- Cairo Junction – A hamlet in the northwest part of the town.
- Catskill – A village that is the primary settlement in the town, located in the northeast on both sides of Catskill Creek.
- Cauterskill – A hamlet west of Catskill village.
- Cementon – A hamlet and census-designated place in the southeast corner of the town

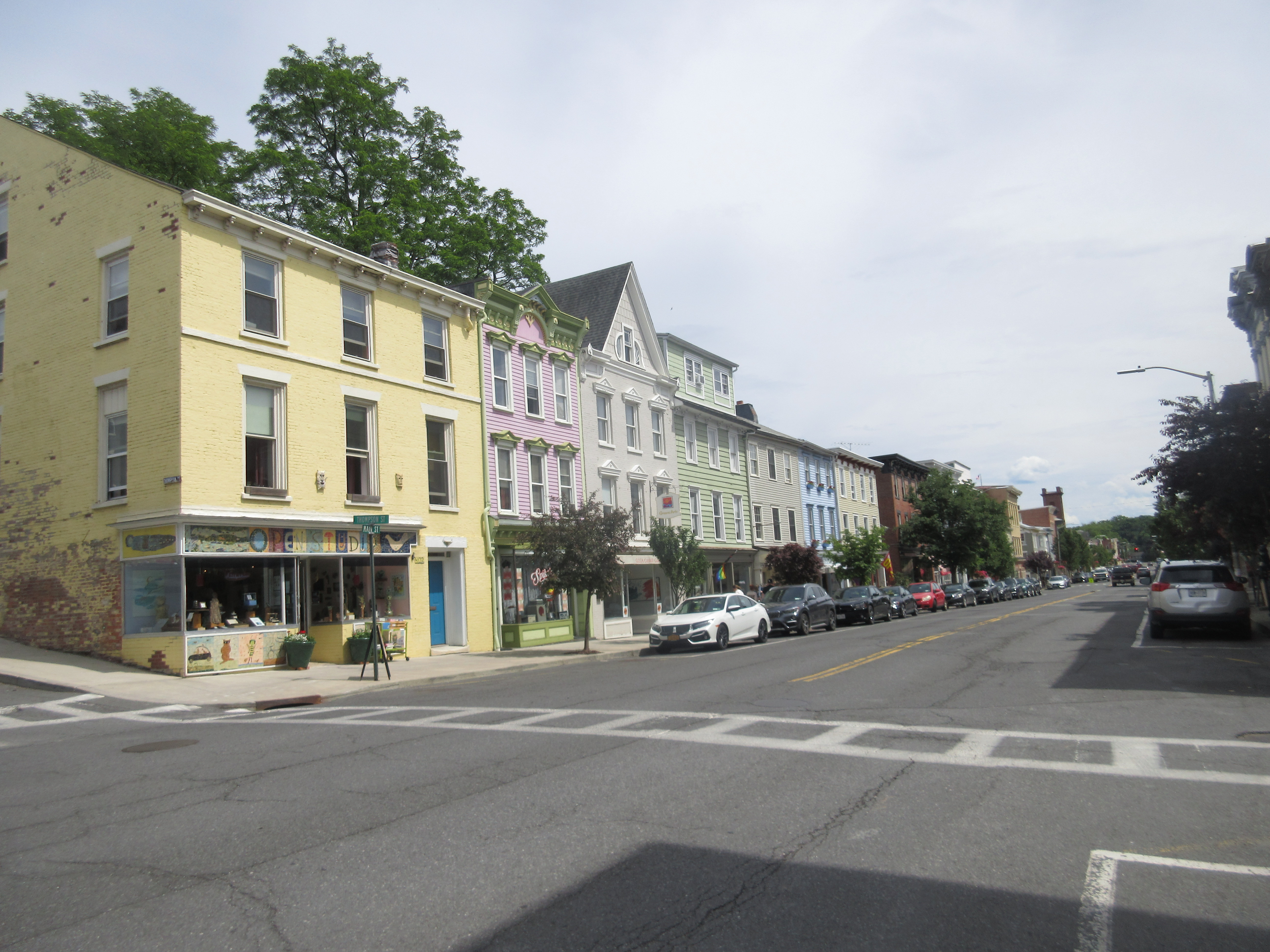
Main Street in the Hamlet of Catskill.

- Hamburg – A hamlet north of Catskill village on the Hudson River.
- High Falls – A hamlet by the south town line.
- Jefferson Heights – A hamlet and census-designated place northwest of Catskill village.
- Kiskatom – A hamlet southwest of Catskill village.
- Lawrenceville – A hamlet in the western part of the town.
- Leeds – A hamlet and census-designated place by the north town line.
- Palenville – A hamlet and census-designated place in the southwest corner of the town.
- Smith's Landing – A hamlet south of Alsen on Route 9W.

== Transportation ==
The New York State Thruway (Interstate 87) and U.S. Route 9W pass north–south through the town. New York State Route 23 passes east–west through the town and heads east across the Hudson River to Columbia County.

Greene County Transit serves the county, with its hub in the village of Catskill.

Until 1958 the New York Central Railroad operated twice daily, in each direction, passenger trains between Albany, New York and Weehawken, New Jersey on the NYC's West Shore Railroad. The rail line continues today as the CSX's River Subdivision, serving freight operations.

== Demographics ==
Historical population
Census	Pop.	Note	%±
2000	11,849		—
2010	11,775		−0.6%
2020	11,298		−4.1%
U.S. Decennial Census

As of the census of 2000, there were 11,849 people, 4,780 households, and 3,035 families residing in the town. The population density was 195.8 inhabitants per square mile (75.6/km^{2}). There were 5,700 housing units at an average density of 94.2 per square mile (36.4/km^{2}). The racial makeup of the town was 89.84% White, 6.03% Black or African American, 0.32% Native American, 0.61% Asian, 0.02% Pacific Islander, 0.86% from other races, and 2.32% from two or more races. Hispanic or Latino of any race were 4.03% of the population.

There were 4,780 households, out of which 28.4% had children under the age of 18 living with them, 45.5% were married couples living together, 13.3% had a female householder with no husband present, and 36.5% were non-families. Of all households, 29.7% were made up of individuals, and 12.1% had someone living alone who was 65 years of age or older. The average household size was 2.38 and the average family size was 2.94.

In the town, the population was spread out, with 23.5% under the age of 18, 7.1% from 18 to 24, 27.3% from 25 to 44, 24.2% from 45 to 64, and 17.9% who were 65 years of age or older. The median age was 40 years. For every 100 females, there were 90.7 males. For every 100 females age 18 and over, there were 88.6 males.

The median income for a household in the town was $33,531, and the median income for a family was $42,807. Males had a median income of $33,832 versus $25,058 for females. The per capita income for the town was $18,563. About 11.2% of families and 14.9% of the population were below the poverty line, including 21.4% of those under age 18 and 9.7% of those age 65 or over.

== Notable people ==
- Charles W. Berry (1871–1941) was a physician, soldier, and New York City Comptroller.
- Jedediah Berry, (b 1977) is an American writer.
- James Bogardus, (1800–1874) was an inventor and architect, the pioneer of American cast-iron architecture
- Mickey Brantley, (b 1961) is a former professional baseball player and hitting coach.
- Kyle A. Carrozza, (b 1979) is an American animator and voice actor
- Robert Charels, (b 1958) is a blues singer.
- Frederic Edwin Church, (1826–1900) was a landscape painter.
- Thomas Cole, (1801–1848) was an English-American landscape painter and founder of the Hudson River School of painting.
- Cus D'Amato, (1908–1985) was an Italian-American boxing manager and trainer
- Edward W. Dwight, (1827–1904) was a farmer and politician.
- John Hill, (1821–1884) was a clerk, bookkeeper, merchant and Republican Party politician
- Tom Judson, (b 1960) is a musical theatre actor and composer, particularly for off-Broadway plays, and a retired pornographic film actor.
- Sheba Karim, author who writes literature and young adult fiction.
- George W. Lay (1798–1860), U.S. congressman
- Sybil Ludington, (1761–1839) Revolutionary War hero
- Hugh Malone, (1944–2001) was an American surveyor and politician. Alaska state legislator, born in Catskill.
- Marc Molinaro (1975), Administrator of the Federal Transit Administration, former U.S. congressman and Dutchess County Executive, New York state assemblyman, Dutchess County legislator, and Mayor of Tivoli
- Charles Palmetier, (1834 - ?) was a businessman and politician.
- Jaap Penraat, (1918–2006) was a Dutch resistance fighter during the Second World War.
- Robert Seaman, (1822–1904) was an American industrialist
- Zachary Cole Smith, (b 1984) is a musician, model and music video director and frontman of indie rock band DIIV
- Bill Stafford, (1938–2001) was a professional baseball player known for his time with New York Yankees
- Jeremy Transue, (b 1983) Alpine skier
- John Thorn (b. 1947), the official historian of Major League Baseball
- Mike Tyson, (b 1966) is a former world professional boxing champion Nicknamed "Iron Mike"
- Abraham Van Vechten, (1762–1837) was a New York State Attorney General.
