= Shaba =

Shaba may refer to:

== Places ==
- Shaba, Kenya
- Shaba National Reserve, a protected area in northern Kenya
- Shaba Province, name of Katanga Province in present Democratic Republic of Congo between 1971 and 1997
- Shabo, Odesa Oblast, town in Ukraine
- Shaba Plateau, a farming and ranching region in the Democratic Republic of the Congo, located in the southeastern Katanga Province
- Shaba, Yongshun (砂坝镇), a town in Yongshun County, Hunan

== Conflicts ==
- Shaba Invasions, two armed conflicts in Shaba Province, Zaire
  - Shaba I, 1977
  - Shaba II, 1978

== People ==
- Abbie Shaba (born 1958), Malawian politician
- Clement Shaba (1926–2008), Zambian Anglican bishop
- McJones Shaba, Malawian politician

== Other uses ==
- Cigaritis shaba, a butterfly of family Lycaenidae
- Iolaus shaba, a butterfly of family Lycaenidae
- Shaba Games, a video game developer based in San Francisco from 1997 to 2009
- Shaba Number, a national standard defined in the framework of the global IBAN

== See also ==
- Saba (disambiguation)
- Shabas (disambiguation)
- Shabba (disambiguation)
- Shebaa (disambiguation), variant spelling
- Sabha (disambiguation)
