= Virginia Bacon =

Virginia Bacon may refer to:

- Virginia Cleaver Bacon (1883–1930), American librarian
- Virginia P. Bacon (1853–1919), American art dealer
