= Queen of Sheba (disambiguation) =

The Queen of Sheba was a monarch of the ancient kingdom of Sheba.

Queen of Sheba may also refer to:

== Arts and entertainment ==
- The Queen of Sheba (1921 film), an American silent film directed by J. Gordon Edwards
- The Queen of Sheba (1952 film), an Italian film directed by Pietro Francisci
- "The Queen of Sheba", a 2006 special of British sitcom The Royle Family
- Queen of Sheba (sculpture), a public artwork by Alexander Archipenko in Milwaukee, Wisconsin, US
- La reine de Saba, an 1862 opera by Charles Gounod
- Die Königin von Saba, an 1875 opera by Karl Goldmark
- The Arrival of the Queen of Sheba, an instrumental sinfonia from Handel's Solomon
- Queen of Sheba (painting), a 1922 painting by Mark Gertler

== Other ==
- Queen of Sheba (restaurant), an Ethiopian restaurant in Portland, Oregon
- Thelymitra variegata, a rare orchid from Western Australia

== See also ==
- Queen of Sheba's Palace (disambiguation)
- Sheba (disambiguation)
- Solomon and Sheba, a 1959 film starring Gina Lollobrigida as the Queen of Sheba
- Solomon & Sheba (1995 film), starring Halle Berry as the Queen of Sheba
