= Bloomington metropolitan area =

The Bloomington metropolitan area may refer to:

- The Bloomington metropolitan area, Illinois, United States
- The Bloomington metropolitan area, Indiana, United States

== See also ==
- Bloomington (disambiguation)
