= Robert Charels =

American musician

Robert Charels (born Robert Charels Smith, October 26, 1958 in Catskill, New York, United States) is an American blues singer in the vein of B.B. King, Duke Robillard, and other artists of the genre. He has recorded three albums under his name: Deception In Your Eyes (1997), Metropolitan Blue (2000, produced by Robillard), and Three Leg Dogs & Old Skool Cats (2007, produced by Michael Hill). In 2001, Charels performed at the Chicago Blues Festival.

In 2005, Charels took part in a jam at the B.B. King's Blues Club in Nashville, Tennessee, as he performed onstage with King, Coco Montoya, Garry Tallent of Bruce Springsteen's E Street Band, and other top musicians.
