= Shebaa (disambiguation) =

Shebaa may refer to:

- Shebaa, Lebanon, a town
- Shebaa Farms, a disputed area of Syria claimed by Lebanon and occupied by Israel

== See also ==
- Shaba (disambiguation)
- Sheba (disambiguation)
