= Sugarbush Resort =

Ski area in Vermont, United States

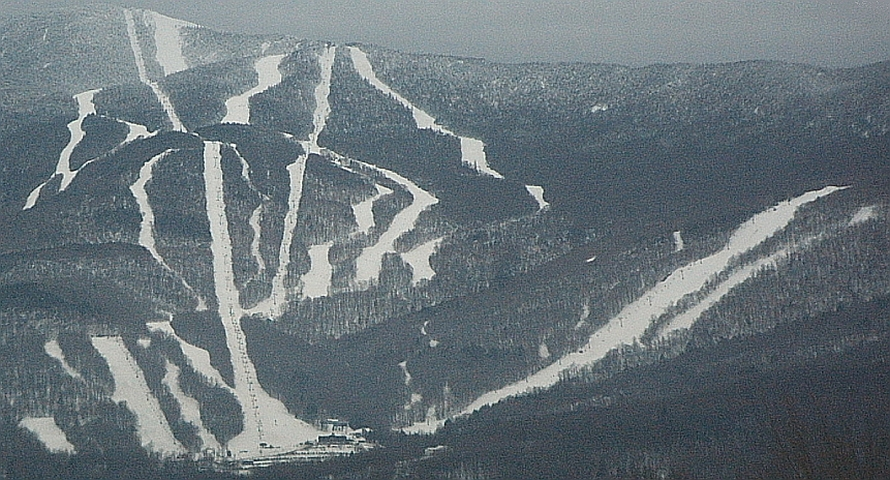
- Sugarbush's Mt. Ellen area in 2007
- Interactive map of Sugarbush Resort
- Location: Warren, Vermont, US (2 miles ESE), Waitsfield (4 miles E)
- Nearest city: Burlington (45 miles NW), Montpelier (26 miles NE)
- Coordinates: 44.135098°N 72.885962°W
- Status: Operating
- Owner: Alterra Mountain Company
- Vertical: 2,600 feet (790 m)
- Top elevation: 4,083 feet (1,244 m)
- Base elevation: 1,483 feet (452 m)
- Skiable area: 484 acres (1.96 km^{2})s (2.34 km²)
- Trails: 111
- Lift system: 16 chairs: 5 high-speed quads, 6 fixed grip quads, 1 triple, 1 double, 3 surface lifts
- Lift capacity: 25,225
- Snowfall: 250 inches (640 cm)
- Website: sugarbush.com

Sugarbush Resort is a ski resort located in the Mad River valley in Warren, Vermont, owned by Alterra Mountain Company. It is one of the largest ski resorts in New England. The resort encompasses more than 4000 acres (16 km²), including 484 trail acres (2.34 km²) skiable, 53 miles (85 km) of trails, and 16 ski lifts. Sugarbush has 111 ski trails, 18 additional marked wooded areas, and substantial off-piste skiing and riding. The summit elevation is 4,083 ft (1,244 m), and it has a vertical drop of 2,600 feet (790 m), the second largest in Vermont after Killington, and the third largest in New England after Killington and Sugarloaf.

== History ==
Sugarbush was opened on December 25, 1958, by Damon and Sara Gadd and Jack Murphy. In 1977, the Gadds sold the resort to Roy Cohen. Cohen purchased the Glen Ellen Ski Area (Mount Ellen) in 1979 and annexed it to Sugarbush. ARA Services purchased the resort in 1983, replacing the original gondola with the Super Bravo and Heaven's Gate triple chair lifts, effectively increasing uphill capacity from 450 skiers per hour to 1800.

Claneil Enterprises bought the resort in 1984 and transformed it into a four-season resort, purchasing adjacent tennis courts, restaurants, condominiums, and a golf course. Claneil improved the chairlift system by installing three new lifts on Mount Ellen. The American Skiing Company purchased Sugarbush in 1995 and installed seven new lifts, increased snowmaking by 300%, and built a sixty-three million gallon reservoir for snowmaking. During this period, Mount Ellen and the main part of Sugarbush were connected by the Slide Brook Express two-way quad chairlift; when it was installed was the world's fastest chairlift, and is still the world's longest detachable chairlift.

When the American Skiing Company bought Sugarbush, the original Green Mountain Express (GMX) chair at Mount Ellen was moved to replace the aging North Ridge Double. Then the GMX was replaced with a new fixed grip quad from Doppelmayer that ran up to the base of Cliffs to encourage use of the new North Ridge Express and the Slide Brook Express. This lift became known as the "Slug" because it was slow and impractical. Summit Ventures replaced this chair with a Poma high speed quad which runs the full length of the original GMX (up to the Glen House), and "the Slug" is now Jay Peak's Metro Quad. Also, the North Lynx Triple was formerly the Sugarbravo triple chair, and was moved to the North Lynx peak to replace a platter lift when the Super Bravo detachable quad was installed. The Castlerock double was also replaced in 2001 with another double following the same chair spacing specs as the original lift.

Summit Ventures NE LLC purchased the resort in October 2001. The majority owner of Summit Ventures was Win Smith who also served as President of Sugarbush Resort. Adam Greshin was the second active investor and is the EVP of Sugarbush Resort. Since 2001, Sugarbush replaced and reconfigured some of the lifts, made further snowmaking improvements such as purchasing new low energy guns, and has completed the $80 million Lincoln Peak Village in 2010, which includes the Claybrook luxury condominium complex, new base lodges (The Gatehouse and The Farmhouse), Rumble's Kitchen, a post-and-beam restaurant, and the Schoolhouse which houses both summer and winter children's programs. The first phase of the Rice Brook slope side residences are scheduled for completion in October 2013.

In 2008, Sugarbush purchased and refurbished a 12-person snowcat to be used for transport to Allyn's Lodge for dining as well as moonlight ski and snowshoe tours. In 2008, Sugarbush celebrated its 50th anniversary in December.

The 2013-2014 season marks Mt. Ellen's 50th (and Sugarbush's 55th) anniversary. The Sunshine Double, installed in 1964, was the last remaining original lift. The base lodge also remains largely unchanged throughout Ellen's history.

In the 2015 offseason, Sugarbush installed a new fixed grip quad to replace the slow and aging Valley House Double. For the 2017-2018 season, Sugarbush replaced its older beginner chairlifts, replacing the Village and Sunshine Double chairlifts with fixed-grip quads, similar to the Valley House Quad.

Alterra Mountain Company purchased Sugarbush in November 2019. In 2020, John Hammond was named President and COO. Since that time the resort has invested tens of millions of dollars in on-mountain improvements, particularly in snowmaking including upgrades to the Summit area at Mt. Ellen, Pushover/Easy Rider area at Lincoln Peak, a new Reverse Traverse trail at Lincoln Peak, and major snowmaking pond upgrades.

== Skiing at Sugarbush ==
Sugarbush has two mountain areas separated by Slide Brook Basin. The south side of Sugarbush, Lincoln Peak, is the resort's main mountain area. Most of the resort real estate is located at or near Lincoln Peak, including Claybrook Hotel, The Lodge at Lincoln Peak, and The Sugarbush Inn. Lincoln Peak has 2,400 vertical feet and a summit elevation of 3,975 feet (1,211.6 m), with 72 of Sugarbush's 111 runs. Also at Lincoln Peak are several other smaller peaks: Gadd Peak, Castlerock Peak, and North Lynx Peak.

=== Castlerock ===
Castlerock Peak is known to for its steep, narrow, winding, New England–style runs. A single double chair brings skiers and riders to this peak and is littered with warnings of "expert only" and "thin coverage." It is also the only peak of Sugarbush that does not use snowmaking, although there are several runs such as Paradise and Domino not in the Castlerock area that also do not incorporate snowmaking. Castlerock is also home to Rumble, arguably the most difficult trail at Sugarbush.

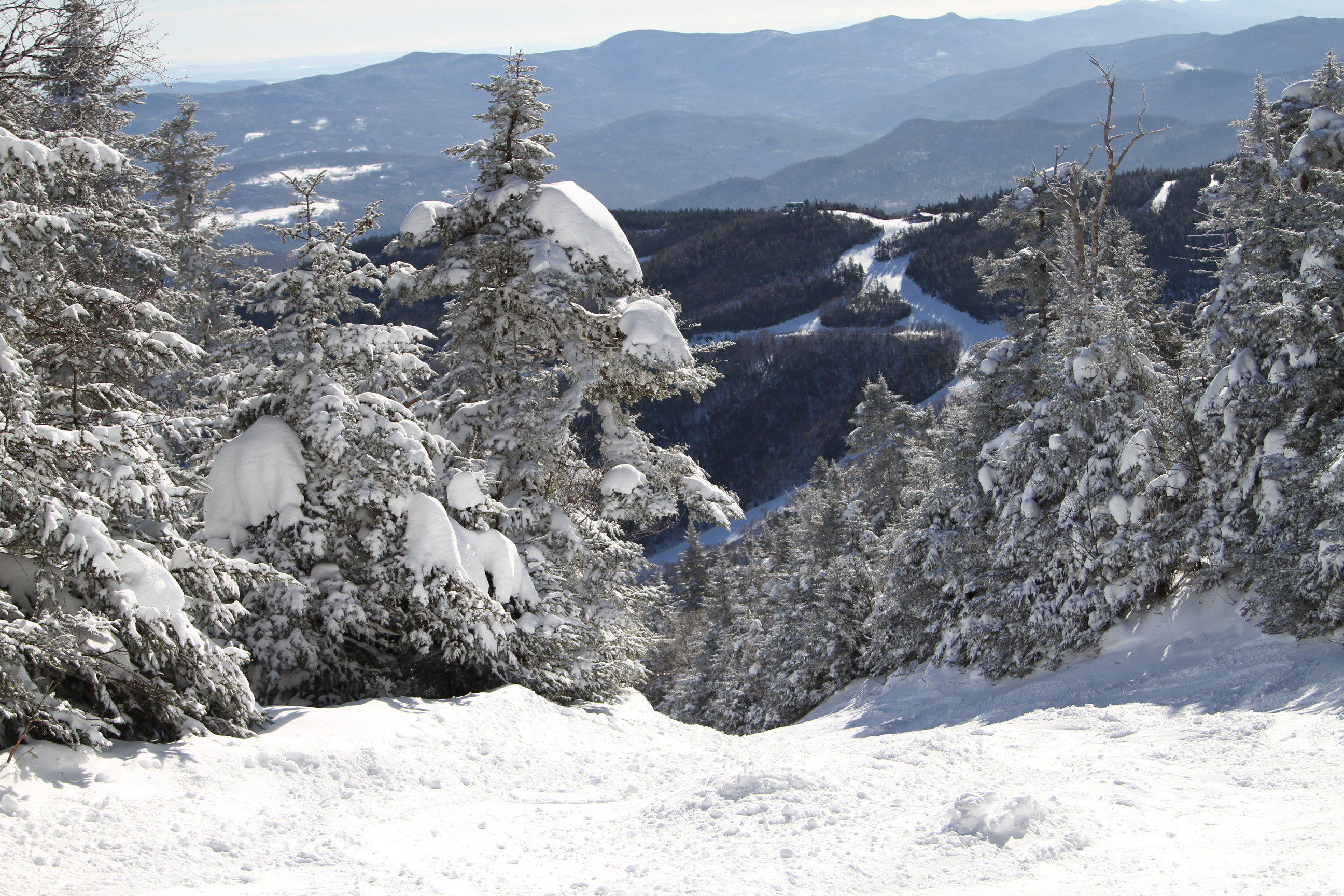
Castlerock in February

=== Slide Brook ===
The area between Lincoln Peak and Mt. Ellen is called the Slide Brook Basin. This wooded wilderness area comprises over 1000 acres (4 km²) and is for expert skiers only. Some of this terrain is very treacherous, and it is not routinely swept by ski patrol. If you follow the Slide Brook it will bring you out to German Flats Road. When the shuttle bus is running it makes a stop at Slide Brook Road (on German Flats) and will drop off at either Lincoln or Ellen base areas. The two areas of Sugarbush, Lincoln Peak and Mt. Ellen are connected by a two mile long chairlift known as the Slide Brook Express Quad. The Quad operates daily when both mountains are open and there is sufficient snowpack. It will not run if the temperature is below five degrees or during strong winds.

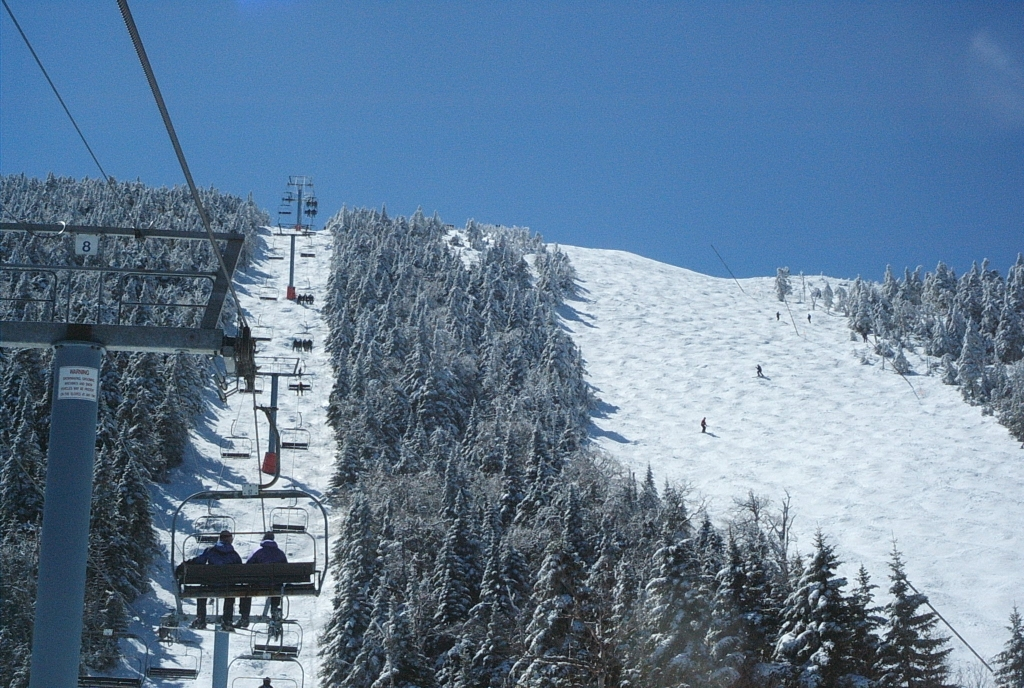
A view of Mt. Ellen's Black Diamond (left) and F.I.S. (right) trails from the Summit Quad. Photo taken during 05/06 season.

=== Mt. Ellen ===
To the north, separate from Lincoln Peak, is Sugarbush's other mountain area called Mt. Ellen. Mt. Ellen's top elevation is 4,083 feet (tied for third highest in the state with Camel's Hump), and it has one of the largest continuous vertical drops in Vermont at 2,600 feet (790 m). Several states and southern Quebec are visible from the summit of Mt. Ellen.

Formerly an independent resort (founded by Walt Elliot in the early 1960s), Mt. Ellen has Sugarbush's steepest run, FIS. Mt. Ellen also has a secondary peak, Inverness Peak, which is home to the Green Mountain Valley School's (GMVS) racing slopes, Inverness, and Brambles.

Mt. Ellen is home to Sugarbush's terrain park. Although some terrain features can be found all over Sugarbush, such as on Slowpoke at Lincoln Peak, the primary terrain parks are on Mt. Ellen's Riemergasse and Sugar Run trails. Sugarbush has chosen not to build a half pipe in recent years, though it has the capability to do so.

Mt. Ellen's terrain includes groomers, terrain parks, and tree skiing, along with mogul terrain.

== Snow at Sugarbush ==
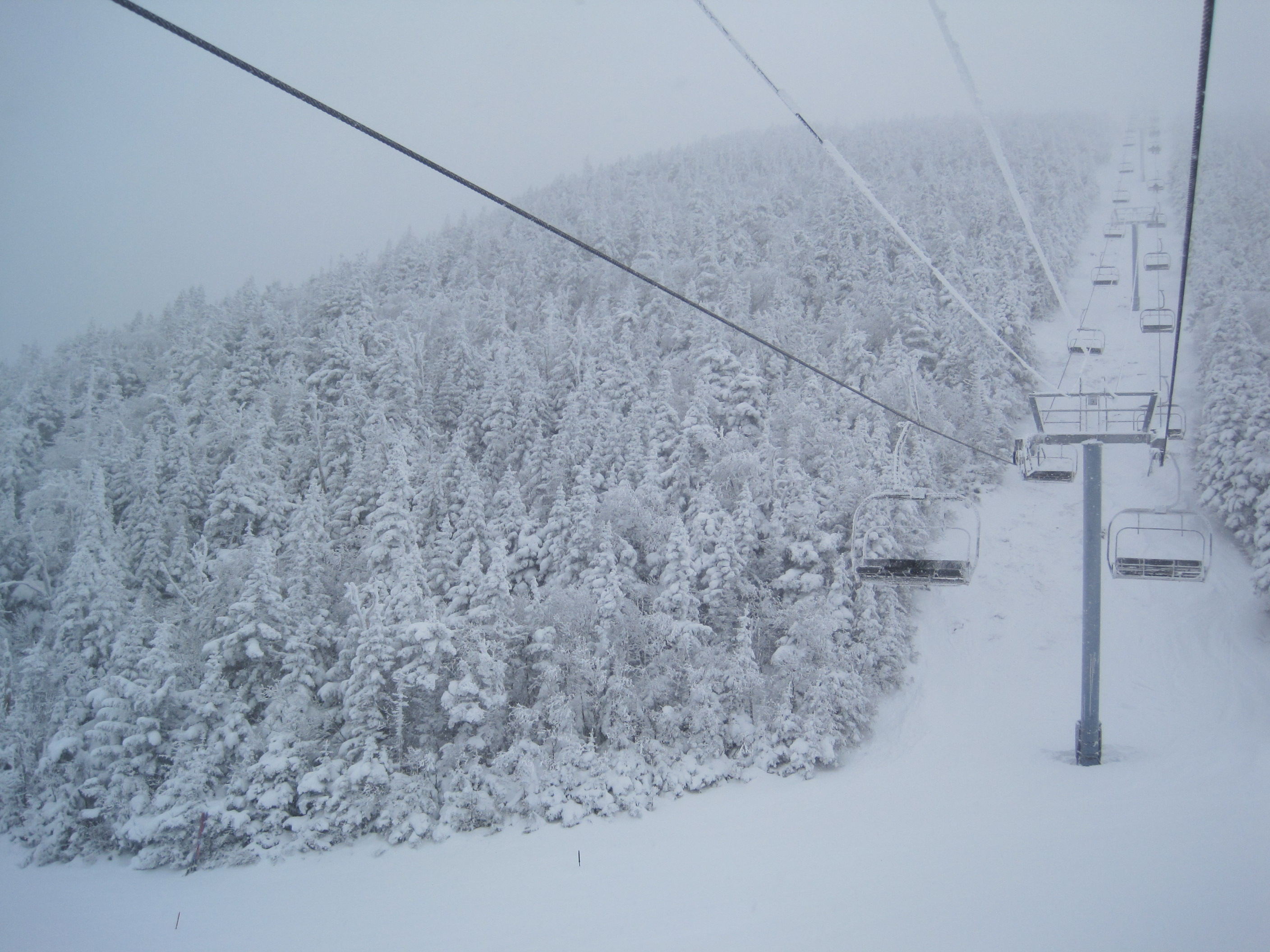
Ascending toward the summit of Mt. Ellen the morning after an 8-inch snowfall. Photo taken Dec 23 2010.

Sugarbush receives an annual average of 262 inches (6.7 m) of snow. Sugarbush has approximately 70% snowmaking coverage, with some areas intentionally devoid of snowmaking systems.

== Mountain statistics ==
=== The Mountains ===
- Mount Ellen: 4,083 ft (1,244 m)
- Lincoln Peak: 3,975 ft (1,212 m)
- Castlerock Peak: 3,812 ft (1,162 m)
- North Lynx Peak: 3,300 ft (1,000 m)
- Gadd Peak: 3,150 ft (960 m)
- Inverness Peak: 2,750 ft (840 m)

=== Statistics ===
- 4,000 acres (16 km^{2}) total
- 508 acres (2.06 km^{2}) skiable
- 53 miles (85 km) of trails
- 11 wooded areas
- 4,083 ft (1,244 m) summit elevation
- 1,483 ft (452 m) base elevation
- 2,600 ft (790 m) vertical drop
- 262 in (670 cm) annual snowfall
- 68% snowmaking coverage

=== Terrain ===
Green Circle	Blue Square	Black Diamond	Total
24 trails, 82 acres (330,000 m^{2})	51 trails, 184 acres (0.7 km^{2})	36 trails, 142 acres (0.6 km^{2})	111 trails, 508 acres (2.1 km^{2})
20%	45%	35%	100%

=== Lifts ===
- In total, there are 16 chairlifts at Sugarbush. There are 7 on Lincoln Peak, and 8 on Mt.Ellen.

==== Lincoln Peak ====
Name	Type	Manufacturer	Built	Length	Vertical	Notes
Super Bravo Express	High Speed Quad	Doppelmayr USA	1995	5689’	1529’	
Gate House Express	High Speed Quad	Doppelmayr USA	1995	3868’	831’	
Village	Fixed grip quad	Doppelmayr USA	2017	1695’	260’	
Valley Quad	Fixed grip quad	Doppelmayr USA	2015	3759’	1242’	Has a loading carpet.
Heaven’s Gate	Fixed grip quad	Doppelmayr USA	2024	3924’	1444’	Only lift to the summit of Lincoln Peak.
North Lynx	Triple	Poma	1995	n/a	n/a	
Castlerock	Double	Poma	2001	4707’	1670’	Has low capacity and slow speed to preserve the area's character.

==== Mt.Ellen ====
Name	Type	Manufacturer	Built	Length	Vertical	Notes
Slide Brook Express	High Speed Quad	Doppelmayr USA	1995	11022’	382’	Longest chairlift in the world, connecting Lincoln Peak and Mt. Ellen.
Green Mountain Express	High Speed Quad	Leitner-Poma	2002	6244'	1495'	
North Ridge Express	High Speed Quad	Poma	1995	5357'	1690'	Originally built in 1990 on Green Mountain's alignment. Relocated to current alignment in 1995.
Summit	Quad	Poma	1990	3501’	1041’	Highest lift at Sugarbush.
Inverness	Quad	Poma	1990’	4411’	1098’	
Sunshine	Quad	Doppelmayr USA	2017	2171'	477’	
KBRA	T-Bar	Leitner-Poma	2020	3966’	1073’	1 of 2 T-Bars used for ski racing and training.
GMVS	T-Bar	Doppelmayr USA	2011	n/a	n/a	Used by Green Mountain Valley School for ski racing and training.

== Off-season at Sugarbush ==
Sugarbush has a health and recreation center, known as the SHARC (pronounced "shark"), with three indoor tennis courts, four outdoor clay courts, two outdoor hard courts, one racquetball court, two squash courts, a weight room, indoor and outdoor pools and hottubs, steam rooms, massage rooms, a rock gym, and a dance/exercise floor.

Sugarbush also has an 18-hole par 71 Robert Trent Jones Sr. golf course, known for its mountainous topography.

Sugarbush is also available for hiking and biking, with mountain terrain for a variety of ability levels. The Bravo lift runs seven days a week from late June through labor day weekend, then on weekends through Columbus Day for lift-accessed Mountain Biking and Disc Golf. Also available in the Summer is an 800-foot (240 m) zip line.

On rare occasions, Sugarbush has hosted "Summerstage" concerts in the offseason. The Vermont band Phish performed at the resort on July 16, 1994, and the complete concert was released on the album Live Phish Volume 2 in 2001. The band performed two more concerts at the venue in July 1995.

Sugarbush has two top-rated disc golf courses. Recently Sugarbush hosted the National Deaf Disc Golf Championship and the New England Championship.

In the Fall, Lincoln Peak offers foliage lift rides on Fridays and weekends through Columbus Day.

The Long Trail, a 272 mi (438 km) hiking trail running the length of Vermont, traverses the summits of both Lincoln Peak and Mount Ellen.
