= Green Mountain Valley School =

Location
- 271 Moulton Road; Waitsfield, Vermont 05673; 44.18562°N 72.850782°W

Information
- Established: 1976
- Headmaster: Tracy Keller
- Grades: 7-PG
- Enrollment: 105
- Website: gmvs.org

Green Mountain Valley School is a college preparatory high school located near Sugarbush Resort in Waitsfield, Vermont. The school was founded in 1973 by Al Hobart, Bill Moore, John Schultz, Ashley Cadwell and Jane Hobart.

== Overview ==
Green Mountain Valley School trains athletes focused on alpine skiing, Nordic skiing and biathlon. The school serves about 130 students in grades 7–12. (The seventh-grade program, called "G7," goes from November to April only, with students expected to attend their home schools in the off-season).

Alpine skiers train on the ski runs Inverness and Brambles in Kelly Brush Race Arena, located at Sugarbush Resort, Mount Ellen. Nordic skiers and biathletes train at multiple Nordic training facilities throughout the area. Many students go on to race for D-I colleges with top tier NCAA ski teams.

== Notable alumni ==
- Sarah Billmeier - Paralympian (1992, 1994, 1998, 2002)
- Emma Gatcliffe - First Trinidadian female skier in Olympic history
- AJ Ginnis - First Greek skier in history to podium in a World Cup alpine race
- AJ Kitt - 4-time Olympian (1988, 1992, 1994, 1998)
- Doug Lewis - 2-time Olympian (1984, 1988)
- Chelsea Marshall - Olympian (2010)
- Jeremy Nobis - Olympian (1994 Winter Olympics)
- Ali Nullmeyer - Olympian (2022 Winter Olympics)
- Daron Rahlves - 4-time Olympian (1998, 2002, 2006, 2010)
- Genevieve Simard - 2-time Olympian (2002, 2006)
- Laura Spector - Olympian (2010)
- Jeremy Transue - U.S. Ski Team Alumni 2002-2009
