= Shabba =

Shabba may refer to:

- Shabba Doo (1955–2020), American actor, break dancer, and choreographer
- Shabba Ranks (born 1966), dancehall rapper
- "Shabba" (song), a 2013 song by A$AP Ferg

== See also ==
- Shaba (disambiguation)
- Shabbat
- Shabbas goy
