= Jefferson-Madison Regional Library =

- Location: Virginia, US
- Established: 1823
- Branches: 8

Access and use
- Population served: 212,841 (2014)

Other information
- Budget: $8,526,519 (2024)
- Director: David Plunkett
- Website: Jefferson-Madison Regional Library

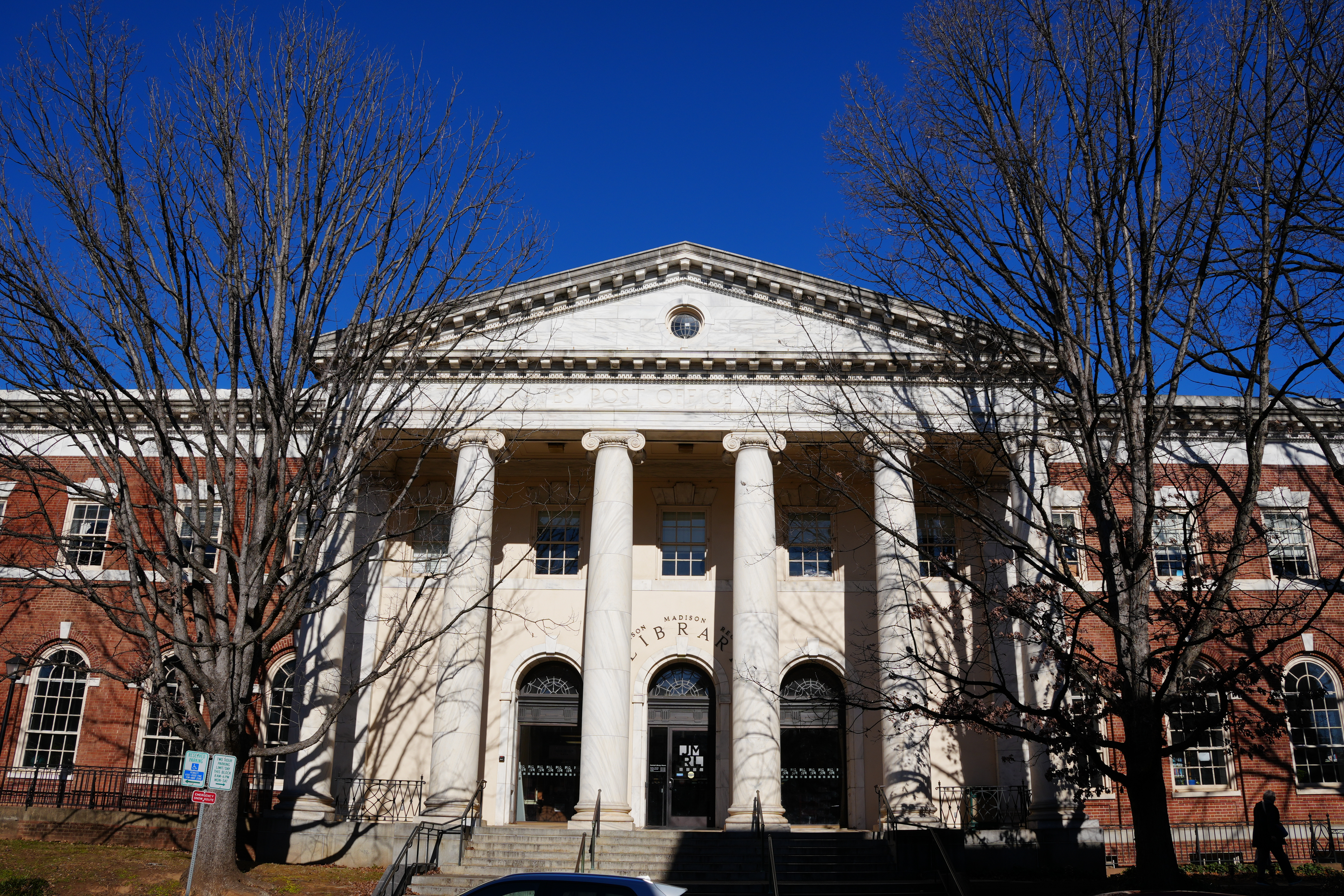
JMRL Central Library branch

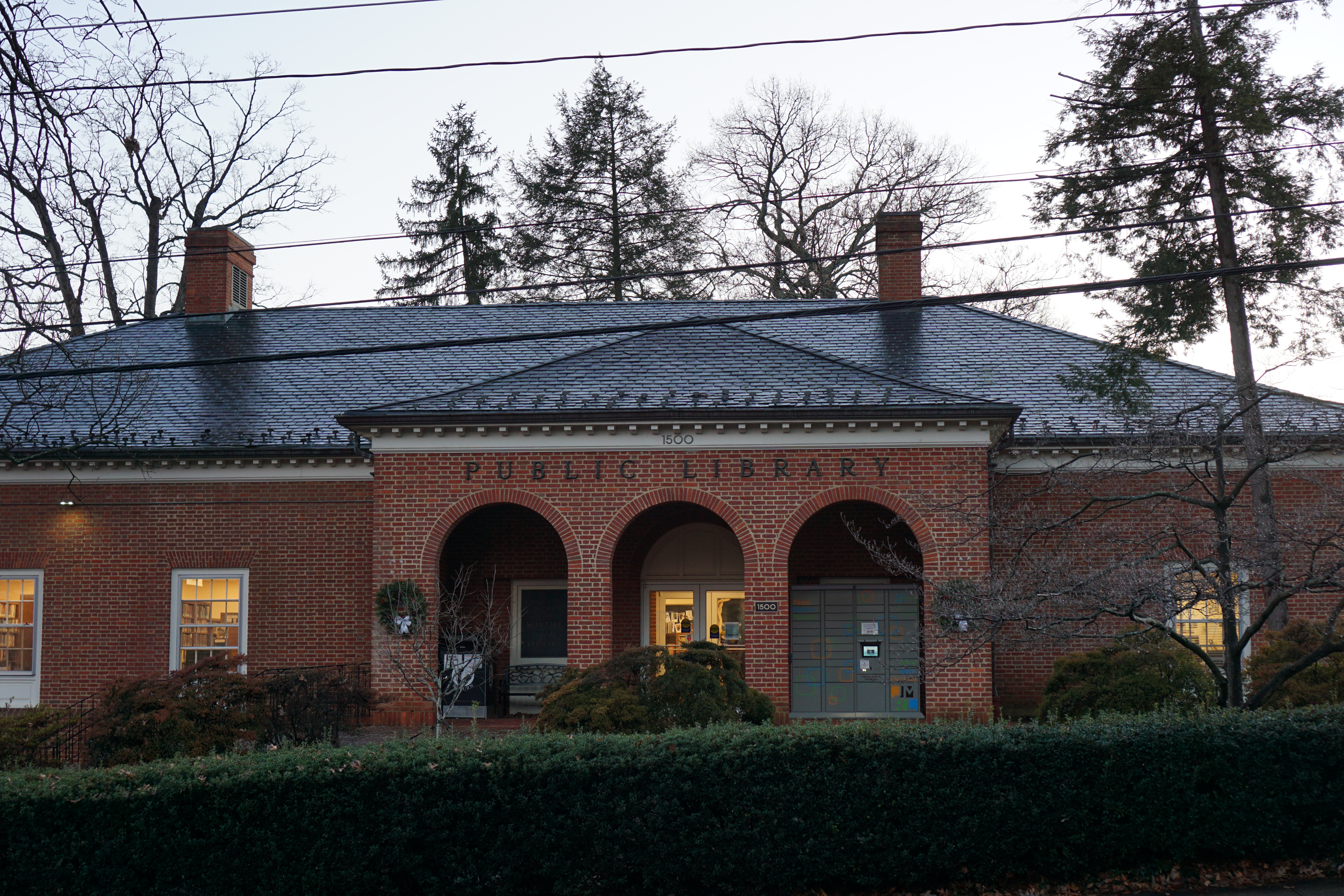
Gordon Avenue branch

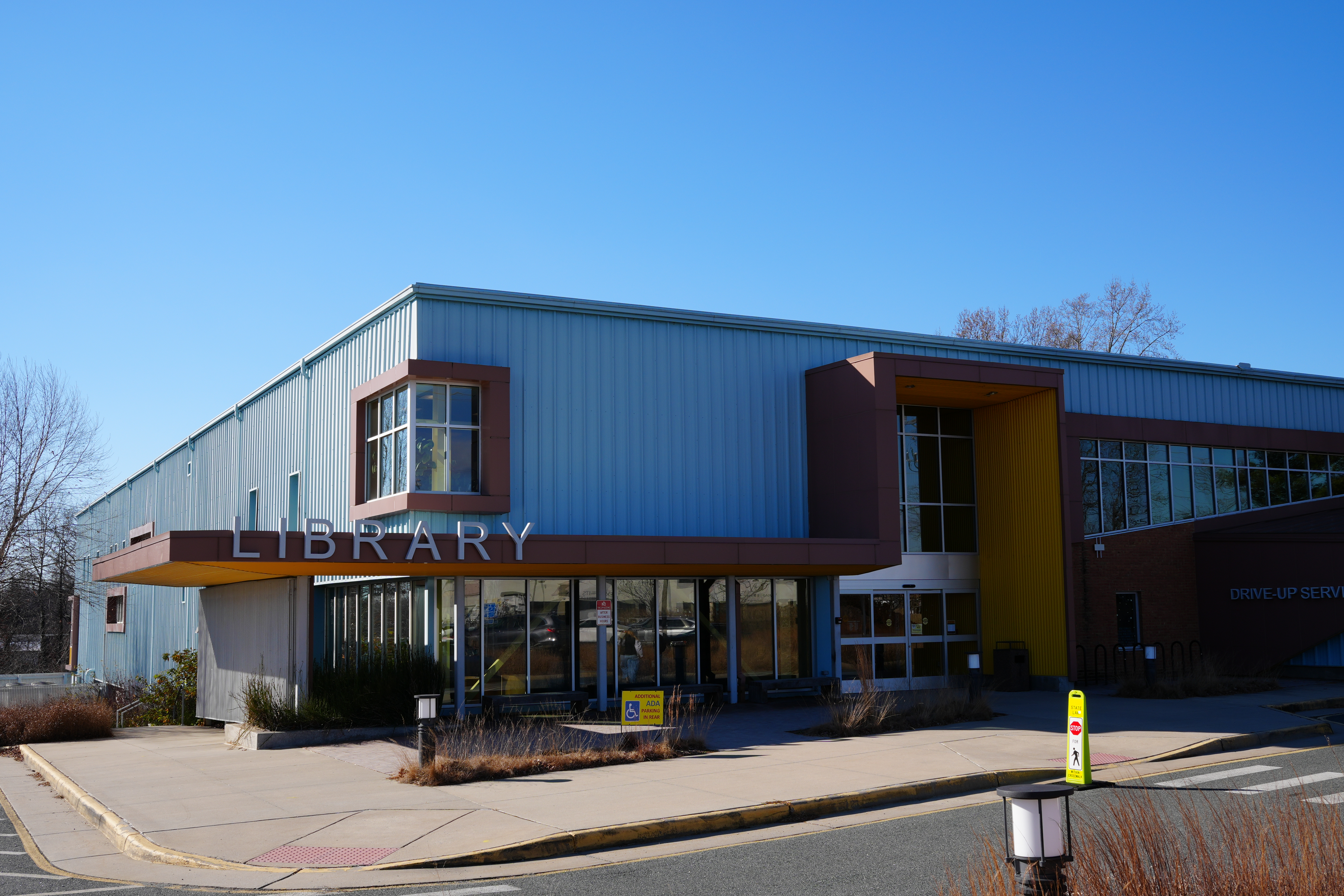
Northside Library branch

The Jefferson-Madison Regional Library system serves Albemarle, Greene, Louisa, and Nelson counties and City of Charlottesville. The library system is within Region 6 of Virginia Library Association (VLA) regions.

== Service area ==
According to the FY 2014 Institute of Museum and Library Services Data Catalog, the Library System has a service area population of 212,841 with 1 central library and 7 branch libraries.

== History ==
The public library service in this area began in 1823. At the time, it was called the Albemarle Library Society. The Albemarle Library remained open until 1834. Paul Goodloe McIntire donated the resources for a new library in 1919. The first public municipal library opened in 1921. The Colored Branch at Jefferson School, the library's first branch library was open in 1934. A few years later, the libraries were integrated in 1948.

The library system formed in 1972 after the Virginia General Assembly started the regional public library systems. The system includes the City of Charlottesville, Albemarle, Greene, Louisa, and Nelson counties.

== Branches ==
- Central Library (Charlottesville)
- Crozet Library (Crozet) established in 1964
- Gordon Avenue (Charlottesville) established in 1966
- Greene County Library (Stanardsville) established in 2003.
- Louisa County Library (Mineral) established in 1999.
- Nelson Memorial Library (Lovingston) established in 1988.
- Northside Library (Charlottesville) established in 1991
- Scottsville Library (Scottsville) established in 1960.
