= Virginia Cleaver Bacon =

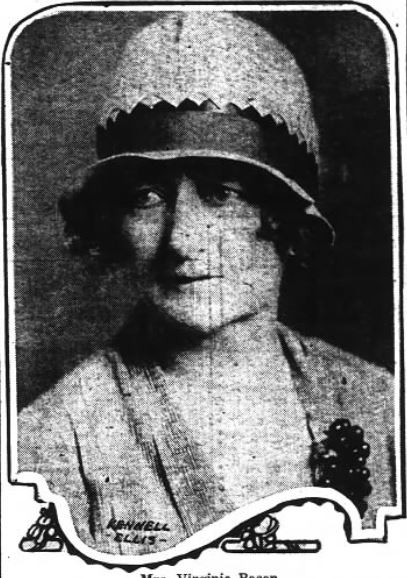
- Born: February 1, 1883; Halsey, Oregon, U.S.
- Died: April 11, 1930 (aged 47); Portland, Oregon, U.S.
- Education: University of Oregon; American University
- Occupation: Librarian

Virginia Cleaver Bacon (February 1, 1883 – April 11, 1930) was the state librarian for Oregon.

== Early life and education ==
Bacon was born on February 1, 1883, in Halsey, Oregon, the daughter of Alonzo and Laura Cleaver. Her sister was the author Kay Cleaver Strahan.

She graduated from Portland High School and obtained an A. B. at University of Oregon in Eugene, Oregon. In 1914, she graduated from the Riverside School of Library Service in California. In 1924, she obtained an A.M. from American University in Washington, D.C.

== Career ==
She was prominent in library work in California, Missouri, and Washington, D.C.

She was advisor in Adult Education at the Portland Public Library and established the first department of its kind on the Pacific Coast and made the work so outstanding that it was quickly adopted elsewhere. She later became Oregon State Librarian in 1929.

In 1905, she was assistant for English Literature at University of Oregon.

In 1909, she was the editor of the Bonville Western Monthly, published in Portland, Oregon.

Between 1913 and 1916, her short fiction was published in numerous magazines, including "In an Oregon Orchard" in Sunset: The Magazine of the Pacific and All of the Far West in 1913, "Trail Song" in Out West, in 1915, and "on Fickle Hill" and "Romany Song" in The Overland Monthly in 1916.

Her short story, "The Path-Treader", was published in Scribner's Magazine in volume 72 in 1922 and was included in the "Best American Short Stories" of 1923.

From 1915 to 1921, she was librarian at Humboldt State Teacher's College of California in Arcata, California. In 1921, she was librarian at Park College in Parkville, Missouri. She was assistant director of the Junior Division at the United States Employment Service in Washington, D.C. In 1925, she became a member of Portland Library staff in Portland, Oregon. She wrote short stories, poems and articles for the most prominent national magazines.

She was the author of Every Day English. In 1925, she co-authored Vocational guidance and junior placement: twelve cities in the United States. In 1928 she published Good English. Good English was a booklet for the Reading with a Purpose series of the American Library Association. Specialists were called on to write the 45 booklets in the series and of that number only two were written by women and only four by librarians.

She was a member of Phi Beta Kappa, the American Association of University Women, the Professional Women's League, the American Library Association, and the American Association for Adult Education.

== Personal life ==
Bacon lived in California and Washington, D.C., and finally moved to 1084 Wilson Street in Portland, Oregon. She married Condon Roy Bean in 1905; the marriage ended in divorce. She married Ralph Bacon in 1910.

She died on April 11, 1930, in Portland; she had been ill for some time prior, and died after her condition worsened.
