= Saba' Palace =

Sheba Palace
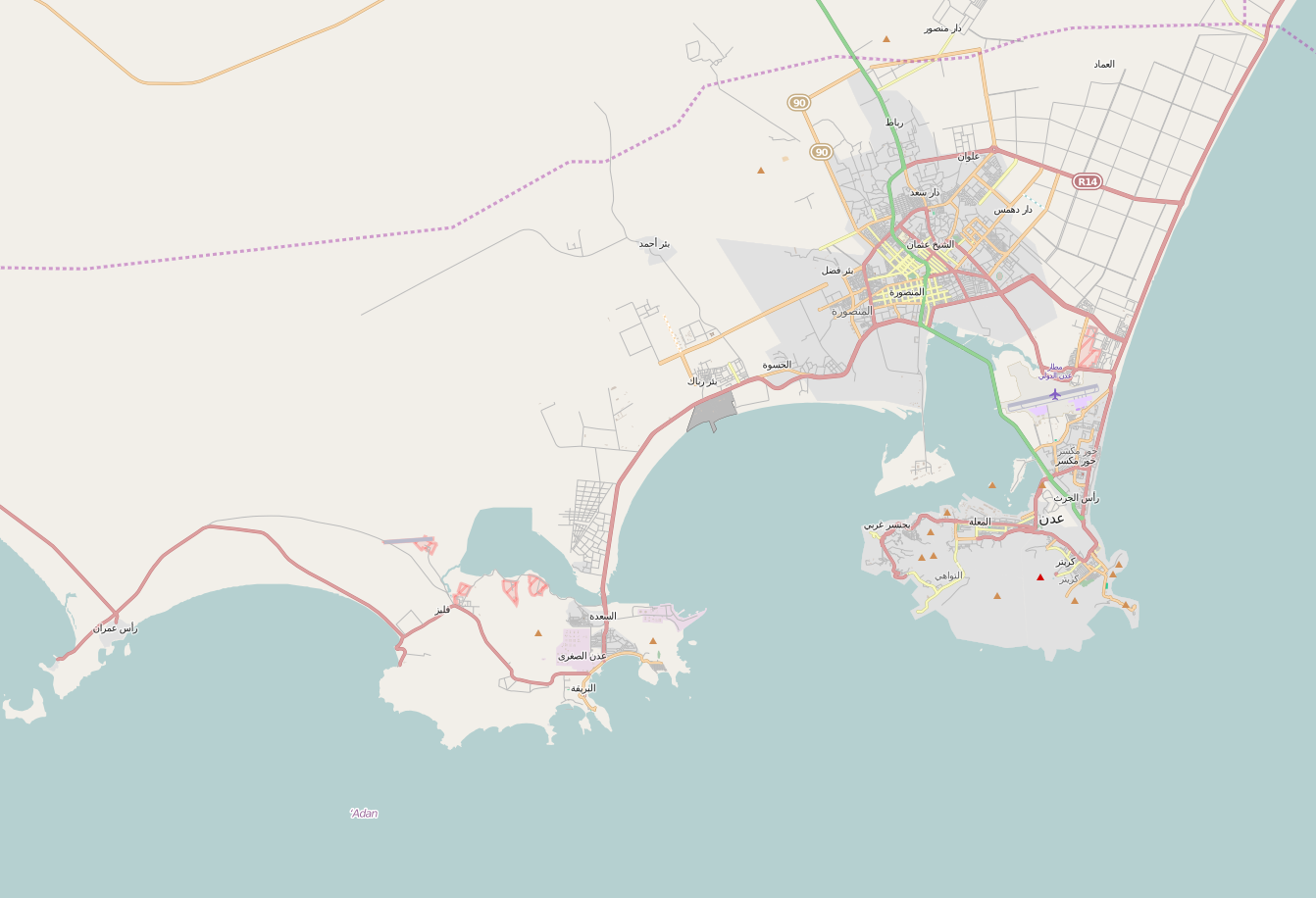
- Location within Aden

General information
- Location: Aden, Yemen
- Coordinates: 12°48′1″N 45°2′22″E

not to be confused with the Queen of Sheba's Palace in Axum or the Queen of Sheba's Palace (Sumharam) near Salalah, Oman.

Saba' Palace is a palace in Aden, Yemen. It overlooks the Arabian Sea.
