= Queen of Sheba's Palace =

The Queen of Sheba's Palace is one of several places popularly held to be the residence of the legendary Queen of Sheba. It may refer to:

- Dungur, archaeological site in Aksum, Ethiopia
- Khor Rori (Sumhuram), archaeological site in Dhofar, Oman
- Saba' Palace, Aden, Yemen
- Shimal Fort in Shimal, Ras Al Khaimah, an 11th century fort known locally as Sheba's Palace.
