= Shabas =

Shabas may refer to one of the following:

- 15427 Shabas, a main-belt asteroid
- An acronym for the Israel Prison Service
- The seventh day of the week or Shabbat in Judaism

== See also ==
- Shaba (disambiguation)
