= Louisa High School =

- U.S. National Register of Historic Places
- Virginia Landmarks Register
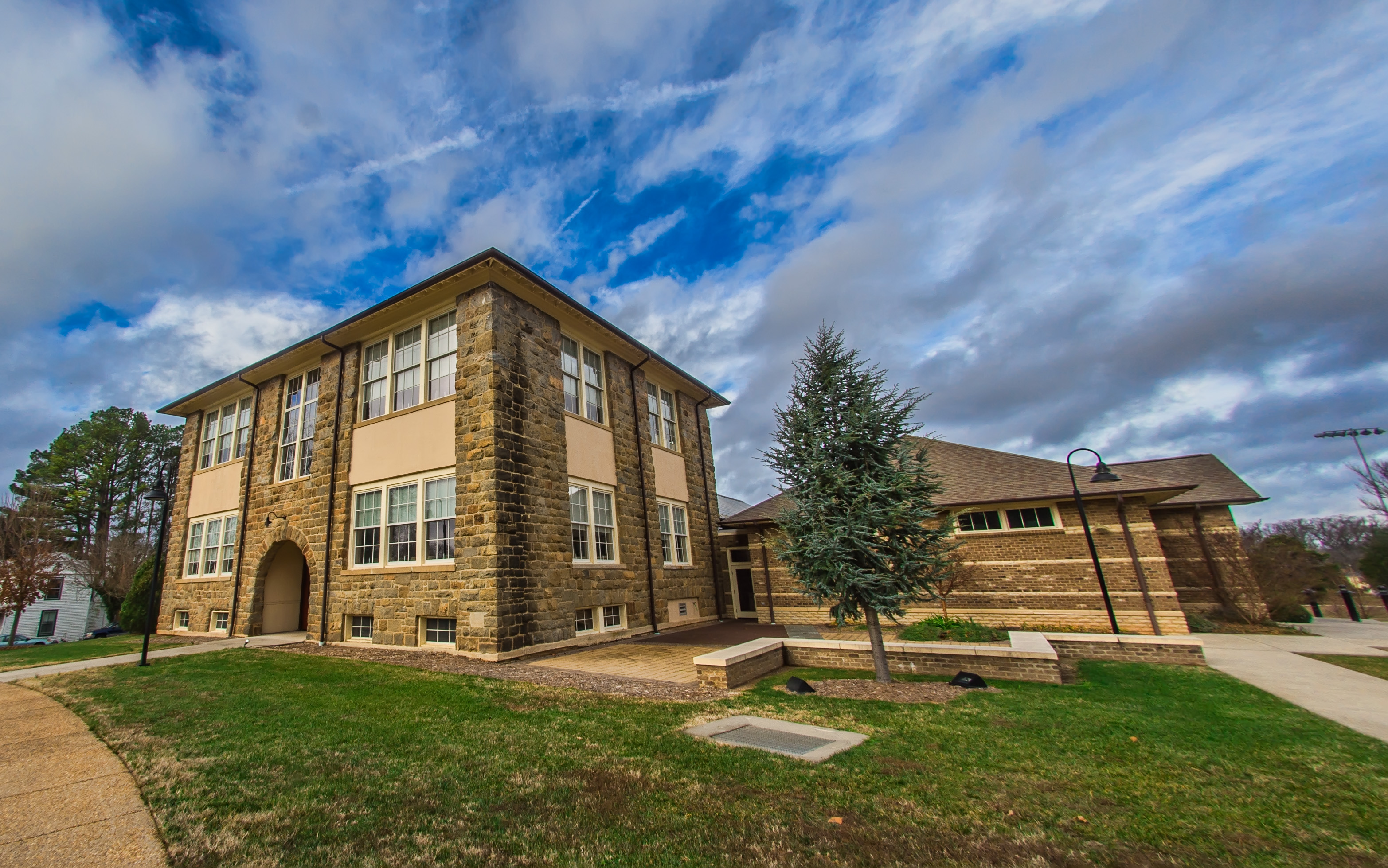

- Location within Virginia Location within the United States
- Location: 212 Fredericksburg Avenue, Louisa, Virginia
- Coordinates: 38°01′30″N 77°59′52″W
- Area: 2 acres (0.81 ha)
- Built: 1907, 1916, 1924
- Built by: Leigh Brothers (1907), Elgin Morris (1924)
- Architect: Robinson, Charles M.
- NRHP reference No.: 11000605
- VLR No.: 254-0004

Significant dates
- Added to NRHP: August 24, 2011
- Designated VLR: June 16, 2011

Louisa High School is a historic high school building located at Louisa, Louisa County, Virginia. It was designed by noted Richmond architect Charles M. Robinson and built in 1907, as a 1 1/2-story, stone building. About 1916, a second story was added along with an auditorium addition to the rear. Early in 1924 a fire gutted the building, leaving only the granite walls. It was rebuilt in its two-story configuration in 1925. The school served as an elementary school after 1940, and closed in 1987. The building was restored starting in 2002, and reopened in 2006 as a town hall, art gallery, and performing arts center.

It was listed on the National Register of Historic Places in 2011.
