= Shaba Number =

Iranian national standard

Sheba (Persian: شناسه حساب بانکی ایران (شبا)) is a national standard defined in the framework of the global IBAN standard with the aim of integrating bank accounts in Iran. Shaba starts with "IR" followed by 24 other digits.

== History ==
Before the International Bank Account Number, there were different national standards for identifying bank accounts, which was confusing for some users. This often resulted in the loss of transaction path information in payments. These account numbers also did not have check digits (structure accuracy control), which increased the possibility of errors in transferring funds.

In 1997, to address these problems, the International Organization for Standardization (ISO) published a new standard called ISO 13616. According to this standard, international account numbers were introduced under the name IBAN, which stands for International Bank Account Number, for international transactions.

The ISO organization improved this standard in 2003 and 2007. In 2007, the ISO 13616 standard was divided into two parts. In the second part (ISO 13616-2:2007), many improvements were made and it became the accepted standard for international money transfers. The official name of this part of the standard is SWIFT, which is currently the most widely used international financial transaction method.

In Iran, since January 1, 2007, the Central Bank of Iran has made the use of Sheba mandatory for foreign exchange transfers. This number is also used in domestic interbank transactions.

This algorithm can also be used to validate the IBAN code of other countries; because, as mentioned, the Sheba code generation algorithm, or in other words, the IBAN code, is international and countries cannot change the algorithm for generating this code.

== Overview ==
Sheba is a national standard defined within the framework of the global IBAN standard with the aim of unifying bank accounts. Banks use different methods to number their customers' accounts, which makes it difficult to transfer money between different banks. A unified format is needed for interbank money transfers. Each bank account has a unique identifier, known in Iran as the "Iranian Bank Account Identifier" or "Sheba" for short. This number in Iran starts with IR and is followed by 24 other digits.

Sheba was defined and explained by the Central Bank of the Islamic Republic of Iran in accordance with the ISO 13616 standard in order to facilitate and standardize interbank and international transactions between banks in the country, and was first implemented and made public on the website of the Central Bank of Iran. This type of account number is used exclusively in all interbank payment systems. Any bank account number can be converted into a Sheba number. Bank systems use Sheba in transfers between Iranian banks Satna and Paya, POS card readers, and Internet portals.
