= Bloomington Thunder =

Bloomington Thunder may refer to:

- Bloomington Thunder (SPHL), a former professional hockey team that competed in the Southern Professional Hockey League, active from 2011 to 2014
- Bloomington Thunder (USHL), a junior hockey team that played in the United States Hockey League
