= Bloomington (Louisa, Virginia) =

Historic house in Virginia, United States

- U.S. National Register of Historic Places
- Virginia Landmarks Register
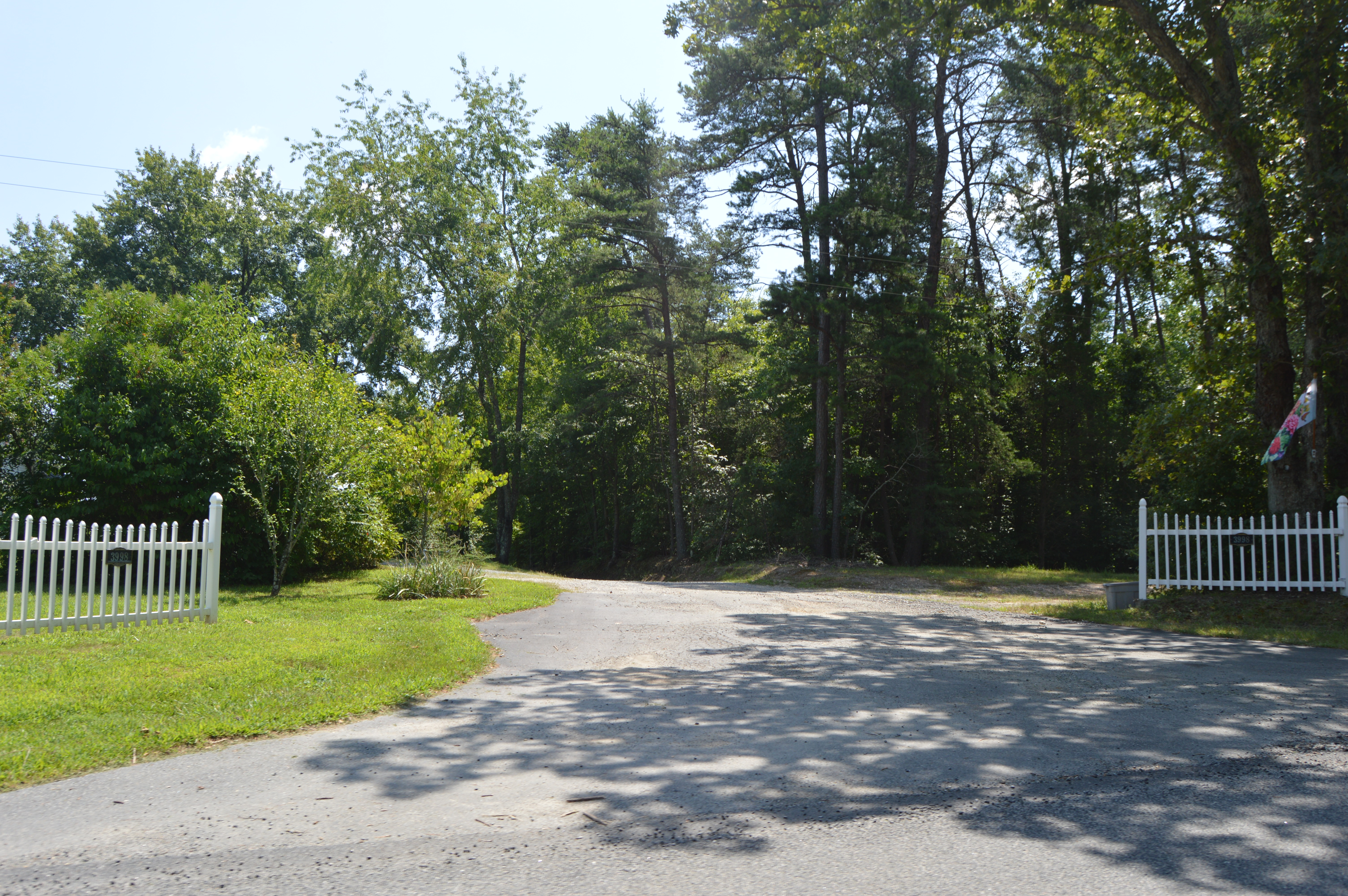
- Property entrance

- Location within Virginia Location within the United States
- Location: Bloomington Ln., Louisa, Virginia
- Coordinates: 37°58′39″N 77°59′33″W
- Area: 7.1 acres (2.9 ha)
- Built: c. 1790, c. 1832, c. 1900
- Architectural style: Colonial
- NRHP reference No.: 04000850
- VLR No.: 054-0006

Significant dates
- Added to NRHP: August 11, 2004
- Designated VLR: June 16, 2004

Bloomington is a historic home located at Louisa, Louisa County, Virginia. The dwelling evolved into its present form from an original two-room, split-log dwelling dating to about 1790. The main block was built about 1832, and is a two-story, three-bay structure with steeply pitched gable roof constructed over a raised brick basement. A one-story, gable-roofed addition was attached to the north wall of the main block about 1900. The house is a rare example of 18th-to-early-19th-century English frame construction which found expression in early Southern Colonial style. Also on the property are a contributing tobacco barn, horse barn, corn crib, and tool shed.

It was listed on the National Register of Historic Places in 2004.
