= Cementon, New York =

- Census-designated place
- Location within New York Location within the United States
- Coordinates: 42°8′9″N 73°55′19″W
- Country: United States
- State: New York
- County: Greene
- Town: Catskill

Area
  - Total: 0.33 sq mi (0.85 km^{2})
  - Land: 0.33 sq mi (0.85 km^{2})
  - Water: 0 sq mi (0.00 km^{2})
- Elevation: 70 ft (21 m)

Population (2020)
  - Total: 164
  - Density: 498.3/sq mi (192.41/km^{2})
- Time zone: UTC-5 (Eastern (EST))
  - Summer (DST): UTC-4 (EDT)
- ZIP Code: 12414 (Catskill)
- Area codes: 518/838
- FIPS code: 36-13299
- GNIS feature ID: 2804325

Cementon is a hamlet and census-designated place (CDP) in the town of Catskill in Greene County, New York, United States. It was first listed as a CDP prior to the 2020 census. As of the 2020 census, Cementon had a population of 164.

The community is in the southeastern corner of Greene County, bordered to the east by the Hudson River and to the south by the town of Saugerties in Ulster County. U.S. Route 9W forms the western edge of the community, leading north 7 miles (11 km) to Catskill village and south 4.5 miles (7.2 km) to Saugerties village.

== Demographics ==
Historical population
Census	Pop.	Note	%±
2020	164		—
U.S. Decennial Census
