= Bloomington, Missouri =

- Unincorporated community
- Location within Missouri Location within the United States
- Coordinates: 39°47′49″N 92°33′37″W
- Country: United States
- State: Missouri
- County: Macon
- Elevation: 823 ft (251 m)
- Time zone: UTC-6 (Central (CST))
  - Summer (DST): UTC-5 (CDT)
- Area code: 660
- GNIS feature ID: 740681

Bloomington is an unincorporated community in Macon County, Missouri, United States. Bloomington is 3.5 miles (5.6 km) north of Bevier.

== History ==
Bloomington was built in 1837, and is the oldest community in Macon County. It was originally called Box Ankle and served as Macon County's seat until 1863. The town was the original county seat of Macon county and a strongly pro-state guard town during the civil war. When the city was occupied by union soldiers they made a deal with the population not to burn the town if they elected union officers in the upcoming city council election. The officers were elected and the union promptly burned the city of Bloomington and moved the county seat to Macon. The town of Bloomington never recovered from this and is now a ghost town.

== Notable residents ==
- Anne Shannon Monroe
