= Bloomington, Wisconsin =

Bloomington
- Village
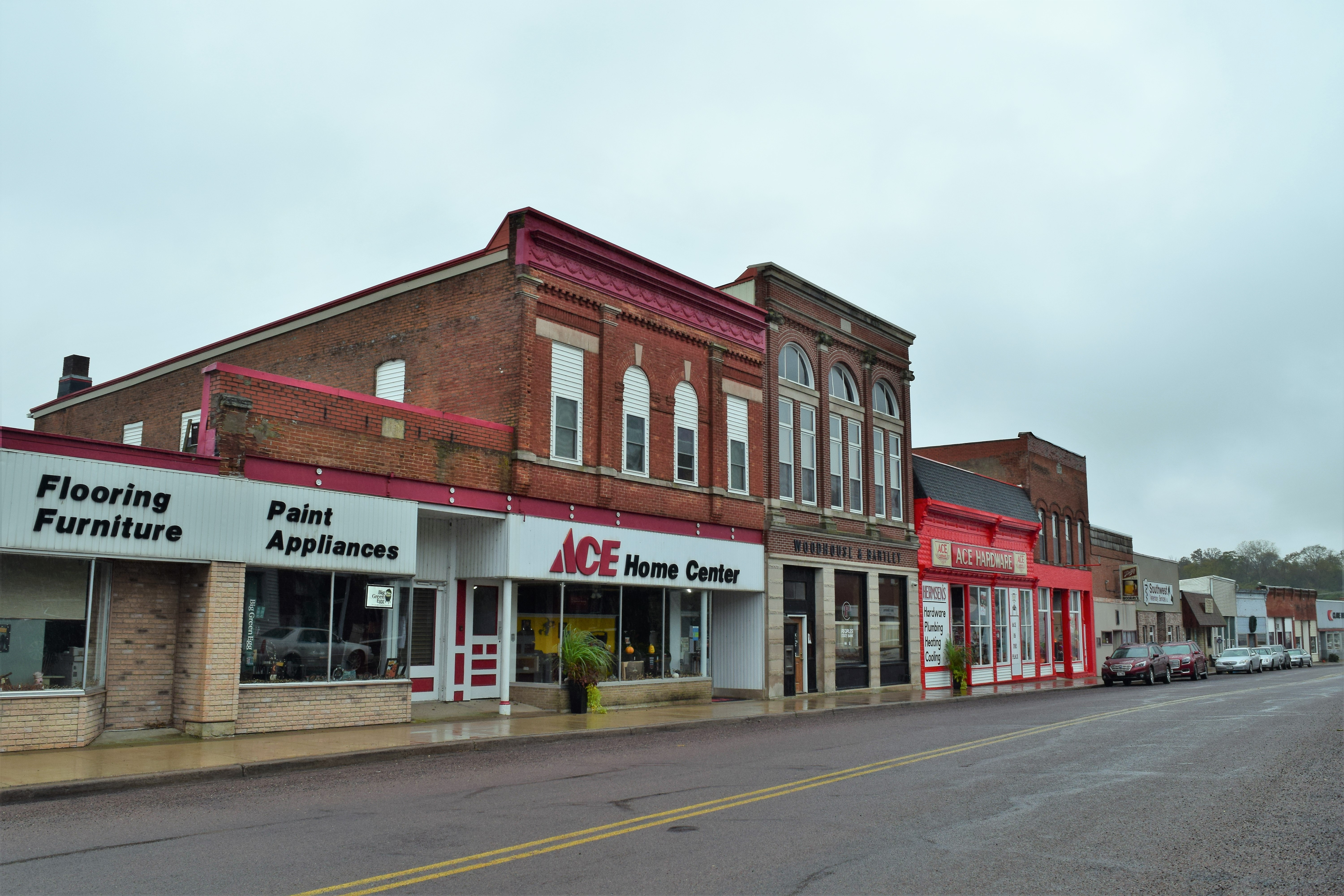
- Downtown Bloomington on WIS 35

- Location of Bloomington in Grant County, Wisconsin.
- Coordinates: 42°53′31.95″N 90°55′38.45″W
- Country: United States
- State: Wisconsin
- County: Grant

Area
  - Total: 1.26 sq mi (3.27 km^{2})
  - Land: 1.26 sq mi (3.27 km^{2})
  - Water: 0 sq mi (0.00 km^{2})
- Elevation: 1,040 ft (317 m)

Population (2020)
  - Total: 741
  - Density: 587/sq mi (227/km^{2})
- Time zone: UTC-6 (Central (CST))
  - Summer (DST): UTC-5 (CDT)
- Area code: 608
- FIPS code: 55-08400
- GNIS feature ID: 1582835
- Website: Village of Bloomington

Bloomington is a village in Grant County, Wisconsin, United States. The population was 741 as of the 2020 census. The village is located within the Town of Bloomington.

== Geography ==
Bloomington is located at 42°53′31.95″N 90°55′38.45″W.

According to the United States Census Bureau, the village has a total area of 1.28 square miles (3.32 km^{2}), all land.

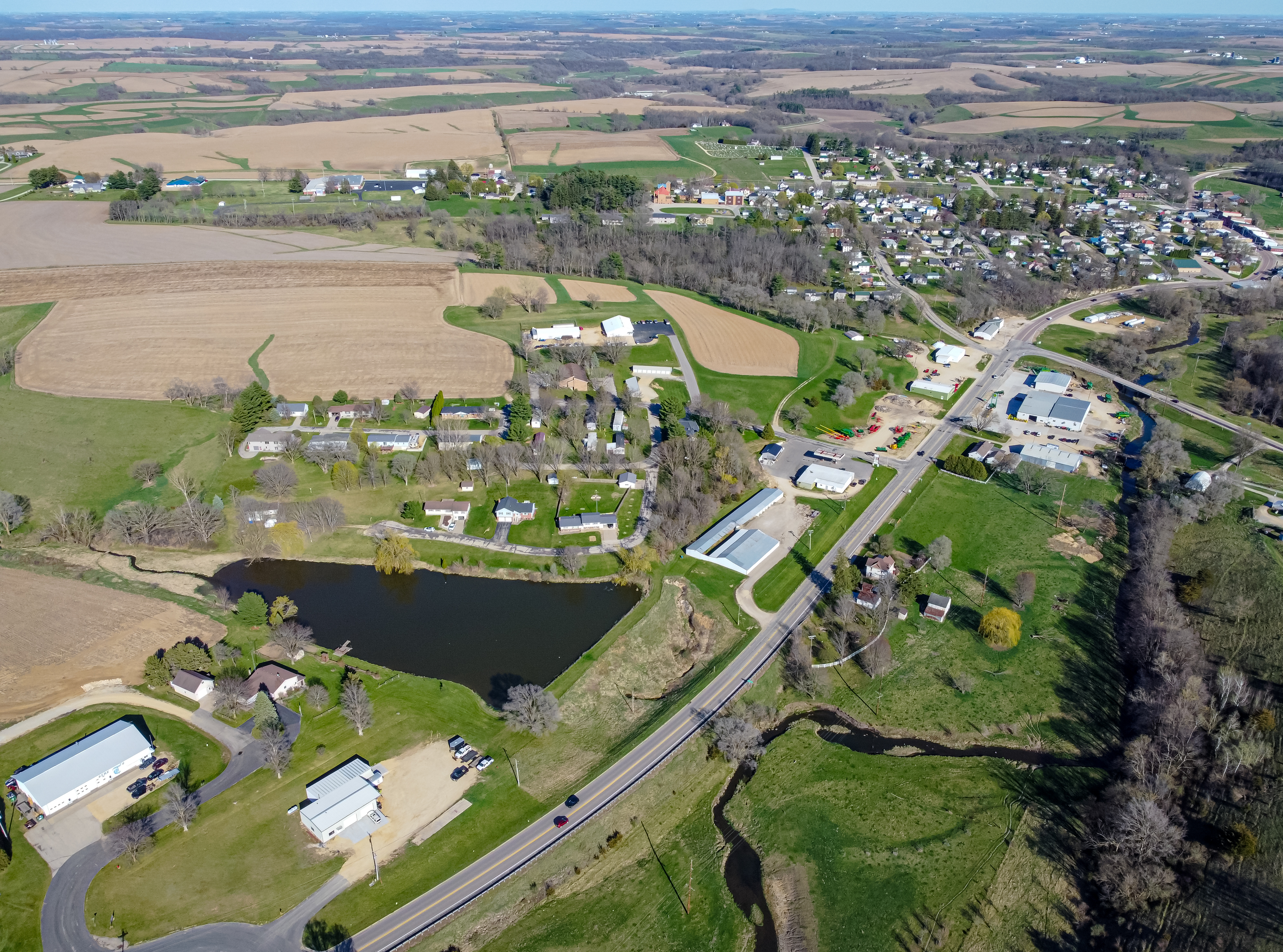
Wis-35 runs through town

== Demographics ==
Historical population
Census	Pop.	Note	%±
1870	365		—
1880	403		10.4%
1890	587		45.7%
1900	611		4.1%
1910	620		1.5%
1920	657		6.0%
1930	591		−10.0%
1940	677		14.6%
1950	631		−6.8%
1960	735		16.5%
1970	719		−2.2%
1980	743		3.3%
1990	776		4.4%
2000	701		−9.7%
2010	735		4.9%
2020	741		0.8%
U.S. Decennial Census

=== 2010 census ===
As of the census of 2010, there were 735 people, 320 households, and 208 families living in the village. The population density was 574.2 inhabitants per square mile (221.7/km^{2}). There were 338 housing units at an average density of 264.1 per square mile (102.0/km^{2}). The racial makeup of the village was 98.2% White, 0.1% African American, 0.1% Native American, 0.3% Asian, 0.3% from other races, and 1.0% from two or more races. Hispanic or Latino of any race were 1.1% of the population.

There were 320 households, of which 29.1% had children under the age of 18 living with them, 53.1% were married couples living together, 7.2% had a female householder with no husband present, 4.7% had a male householder with no wife present, and 35.0% were non-families. 30.9% of all households were made up of individuals, and 17.2% had someone living alone who was 65 years of age or older. The average household size was 2.30 and the average family size was 2.86.

The median age in the village was 40.7 years. 25% of residents were under the age of 18; 6.3% were between the ages of 18 and 24; 23.5% were from 25 to 44; 24% were from 45 to 64; and 21.4% were 65 years of age or older. The gender makeup of the village was 49.4% male and 50.6% female.

=== 2000 census ===
As of the census of 2000, there were 701 people, 308 households, and 198 families living in the village. The population density was 541.2 people per square mile (208.2/km^{2}). There were 329 housing units at an average density of 254.0 per square mile (97.7/km^{2}). The racial makeup of the village was 99.71% White, 0.14% Native American, and 0.14% from two or more races. 0.00% of the population were Hispanic or Latino of any race.

There were 308 households, out of which 25.6% had children under the age of 18 living with them, 55.5% were married couples living together, 4.2% had a female householder with no husband present, and 35.4% were non-families. 31.2% of all households were made up of individuals, and 18.5% had someone living alone who was 65 years of age or older. The average household size was 2.28 and the average family size was 2.84.

In the village, the population was spread out, with 23.4% under the age of 18, 6.8% from 18 to 24, 24.8% from 25 to 44, 23.3% from 45 to 64, and 21.7% who were 65 years of age or older. The median age was 42 years. For every 100 females, there were 94.7 males. For every 100 females age 18 and over, there were 95.3 males.

The median income for a household in the village was $34,750, and the median income for a family was $40,833. Males had a median income of $26,953 versus $17,917 for females. The per capita income for the village was $17,960. About 2.8% of families and 4.6% of the population were below the poverty line, including 2.9% of those under age 18 and 10.2% of those age 65 or over.
