= Jeremy Transue =

American alpine skier (born 1983)

Personal information
- Born: June 1, 1983 (age 43) Catskill, NY, USA
- Height: 5 ft 11 in (180 cm)
- Website: USST Bio

Skiing career
- Sport: Alpine skiing
- Club: Green Mountain Valley School
- Retired: 2009 (age 26)
- Disciplines: Giant Slalom, Super-G, Downhill
- World Cup debut: November 29, 2008

Jeremy Transue (born June 1, 1983) is a former American alpine skier.

Born in Hunter Mountain, New York, Jeremy was introduced to skiing at 18 months. He began racing at the age of 6, where his father, Bruce, was the Operations Manager. For high school, he attended the Green Valley Mountain School in Vermont, where he honed his racing abilities. Later on, he joined the US Ski Team (USST) as a C-Squad member. However, since the C-Squad is age-capped at 24, Jeremy came under pressure to achieve and move up to B-Squad. After winning three late-season FIS races in 2007, including the absolute last of the season by a one-second margin, "Worm," as he is known, came through. A member of the USST B-Squad from 2007 to 2009, he was ranked in the top 100 worldwide in the Super-G and Downhill disciplines. Jeremy was sponsored by the Rossignol ski company. He retired in 2009 after a career-best 34th-place finish on the FIS Alpine Ski World Cup. He coached at Green Mountain Valley School for several years before moving to New York to coach at New York Ski Education Foundation (NYSEF).

== Sources ==
- FIS Bio
- USST Bio
- Stowe Reporter article
- NYSEF Announces Jeremy Transue as Head Women's Alpine Coach
- 32 Random Questions with U.S. Ski Team Member Jeremy Transue
- "Jeremy Transue - News & Info - Alpine Skiing". TNT Sports.
