= Bloomington (town), Wisconsin =

Town in Grant County, Wisconsin

Bloomington, Wisconsin
- Town
- Town of Bloomington
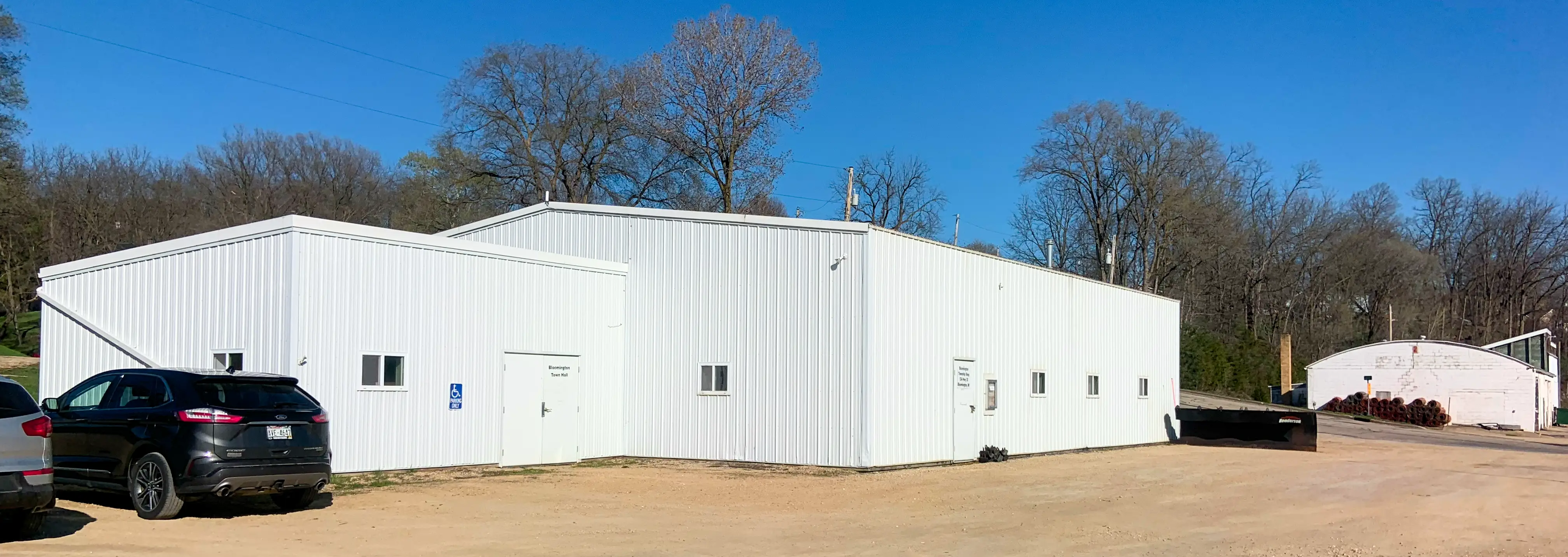
- Bloomington Town Hall

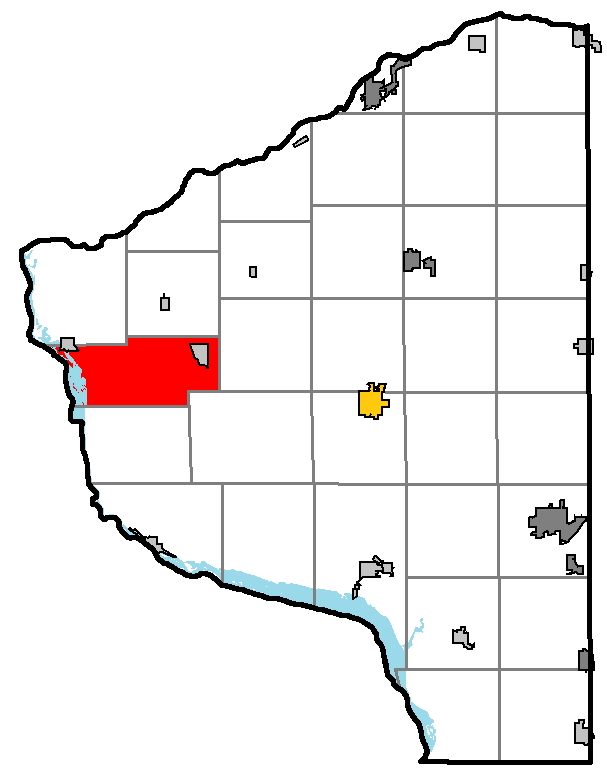
- Location of Bloomington, within Grant County, Wisconsin

- Location of Grant County within Wisconsin
- Coordinates: 42°52′35″N 91°00′20″W
- Country: United States
- State: Wisconsin
- County: Grant

Area
  - Total: 39.99 sq mi (103.6 km^{2})
  - Land: 37.09 sq mi (96.1 km^{2})
  - Water: 2.90 sq mi (7.5 km^{2})

Population (2020)
  - Total: 331
  - Density: 8.92/sq mi (3.45/km^{2})
- Time zone: UTC-6 (Central (CST))
  - Summer (DST): UTC-5 (CDT)
- ZIP Code: 53804
- Area code(s): 608 and 353
- GNIS feature ID: 1582836
- Website: townofbloomington.com

Bloomington is a town in Grant County, Wisconsin, United States. The population was 331 at the 2020 United States census. The Village of Bloomington is located within the town.

== Names ==
The town was first called Blake's Prairie, then later Tafton, before being renamed Bloomington ("blooming town").

== Geography ==
According to the United States Census Bureau, the town has a total area of 39.9 square miles (103.3 km^{2}), of which 36.4 square miles (94.2 km^{2}) is land and 3.5 square miles (9.1 km^{2}; 8.78%) is water.

== Demographics ==
At the 2000 United States census there were 399 people, 130 households, and 99 families living in the town. The population density was 11.0 people per square mile (4.2/km^{2}). There were 147 housing units at an average density of 4.0 per square mile (1.6/km^{2}). The racial makeup of the town was 99.25% White, 0.50% from other races, and 0.25% from two or more races. 0.75% of the population were Hispanic or Latino of any race. Of the 130 households 41.5% had children under the age of 18 living with them, 66.9% were married couples living together, 6.9% had a female householder with no husband present, and 23.1% were non-families. 18.5% of households were one person and 8.5% were one person aged 65 or older. The average household size was 3.07 and the average family size was 3.61.

The age distribution was 35.3% under the age of 18, 7.0% from 18 to 24, 27.8% from 25 to 44, 18.0% from 45 to 64, and 11.8% 65 or older. The median age was 34 years. For every 100 females, there were 103.6 males. For every 100 females age 18 and over, there were 104.8 males.

The median household income was $27,679 and the median family income was $34,286. Males had a median income of $20,938 versus $17,500 for females. The per capita income for the town was $11,622. About 18.1% of families and 20.5% of the population were below the poverty line, including 21.3% of those under age 18 and 39.4% of those age 65 or over.
