= Sheba Karim =

American author

- Born: Catskill, New York
- Occupation: Author
- Writing career
- Genres: Literature, Young adult fiction
- Website: shebakarim.com

Sheba Karim is an American author who writes literature and young adult fiction.

== Early life ==
Sheba Karim was born and raised in Catskill, New York. She graduated from the New York University School of Law and received a M.F.A. from the Iowa Writers' Workshop.

== Career ==
Sheba Karim is the author of Mariam Sharma Hits the Road (HarperCollins June 2018), the first South-Asian American road trip novel, which NPR called "fun, political and the perfect addition to a summer travel bag." Her second novel, That Thing We Call a Heart (HarperCollins May 2017), was named a Best Contemporary Teen Read of 2017 and a Best Teen Read of 2017 with a Touch of Humor by Kirkus Reviews, an Amelia Bloomer Best Feminist Book for Young Readers by the American Library Association, and a Bank Street Best Book of the Year. Her debut novel, Skunk Girl, was one of the first young adult novels to tackle issues of South Asian and Muslim American identity. She has been awarded residences at Hedgebrook, Kimmel Nelson Harding Center for the Arts, Ledig House and Millay Colony for the Arts.

== Bibliography ==
Books

- Mariam Sharma Hits the Road, HarperCollins, June 2018.
- That Thing We Call a Heart, HarperCollins, May 2017.
- Skunk Girl, Farrar, Straus and Giroux BYR, March 2009.
- Editor, Alchemy: The Tranquebar Book of Erotic Short Stories 2, Tranquebar Press, November 2012.
