= Bloomington, Nova Scotia =

Community in Nova Scotia, Canada

Coordinates: 44°52′48.07″N 65°0′8.69″W

Bloomington in Nova Scotia

Bloomington is a community in the Canadian province of Nova Scotia, located in Annapolis County.
