= Bloomington Township, McLean County, Illinois =

Coordinates: 40°25′58″N 88°59′04″W

Bloomington Township
- Township
- Location in McLean County

- McLean County's location in Illinois
- Country: United States
- State: Illinois
- County: McLean
- Established: November 3, 1857

Area
  - Total: 21.24 sq mi (55.0 km^{2})
  - Land: 21.2 sq mi (55 km^{2})
  - Water: 0.04 sq mi (0.10 km^{2}) 0.19%

Population (2010)
  - Estimate (2016): 78,005
  - Density: 134.5/sq mi (51.9/km^{2})
- Time zone: UTC-6 (CST)
  - Summer (DST): UTC-5 (CDT)
- FIPS code: 17-113-06639

Bloomington Township is located in McLean County, Illinois. As of the 2010 census, its population was 2,851 and it contained 1,127 housing units. it is adjacent to the city of Bloomington.

== Geography ==
According to the 2010 census, the township has a total area of 21.24 square miles (55.0 km^{2}), of which 21.2 square miles (55 km^{2}) (or 99.81%) is land and 0.04 square miles (0.10 km^{2}) (or 0.19%) is water.

== Demographics ==
Historical population
Census	Pop.	Note	%±
2016 (est.)	78,005
U.S. Decennial Census
