= Kay Cleaver Strahan =

American writer

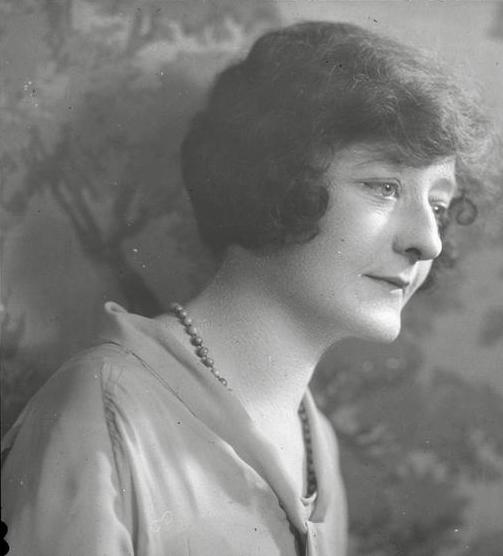
- Kay Cleaver Strahan, 1936
- Born: January 4, 1888; La Grande, Oregon
- Died: August 14, 1941 (aged 53); Portland, Oregon
- Occupation: Author
- Spouse: William Nicholas Strahan
- Writing career
- Genres: Mysteries and detective stories
- Notable works: The Desert Moon Mystery; Footprints
- Notable awards: The Crime Club’s Scotland Yard Prize

Kay Cleaver Strahan (January 4, 1888 – August 14, 1941) was an American writer of short stories and mystery novels. She created the character of the "crime analyst" Lynn McDonald.

== Biography ==
Strahan was born in La Grande, Oregon, on January 4, 1888, the daughter of Dr. Alonzo Cleaver and Laura Bryson.

She moved to Portland, Oregon, in 1895.

Strahan married William Nicholas Strahan.

In 1918 she began writing, contributing short stories to Collier's, The American, Good Housekeeping, Ladies Home Journal, The Delineator, Munsey's, and others.

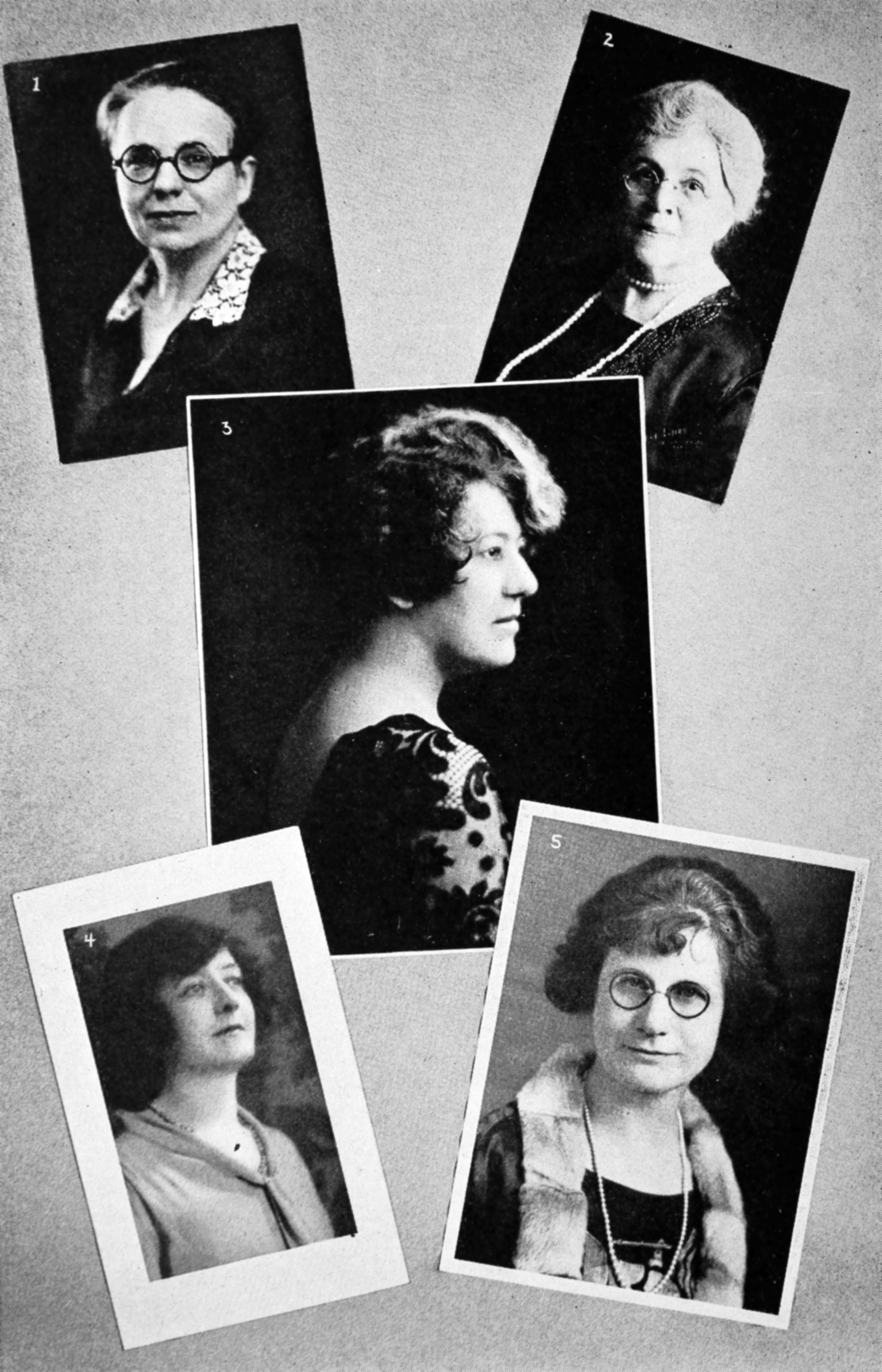
A Few of the Eminent Women of Oregon, Sheba Hargreaves, Eva Emery Dye, Anne Shannon Monroe, Kay Cleaver Strahan, Edith Knight Hill (Marian Miller)

She was also a mystery murder novelist, among her books: Peggy Mary (1915), Something That Begins with "T" (1918), The Desert Moon Mystery (1927), Footprints (1929), Death Traps (1930), Three Kinds of Love (1931), October House (1932), The Meriwether Mystery (1932), The Hobgoblin Murder (1934), The Desert Lake Mystery (1936). She created the character of the "seasoned crime analyst" Lynn McDonald. Her book Footprints won the Scotland Yard Prize for the best Mystery and Detective Story of the Year; the contest was held by The Crime Club and the winner received the prize of $2500 ($46,875 in 2025 dollars). The three Crime Club judges who chose Footprints were Will Cuppy, William Rose Benet and Grant Overton. She used Oregon settings for much of her writing and generally provided a surprise ending. Alice Hamilton wrote in her private letters that she was reading Strahan.

She lived at 1084 Wilson St., Portland, Oregon.

She died on August 14, 1941.
