= Dungur =

7th century CE World Heritage Site in Axum, Ethiopia

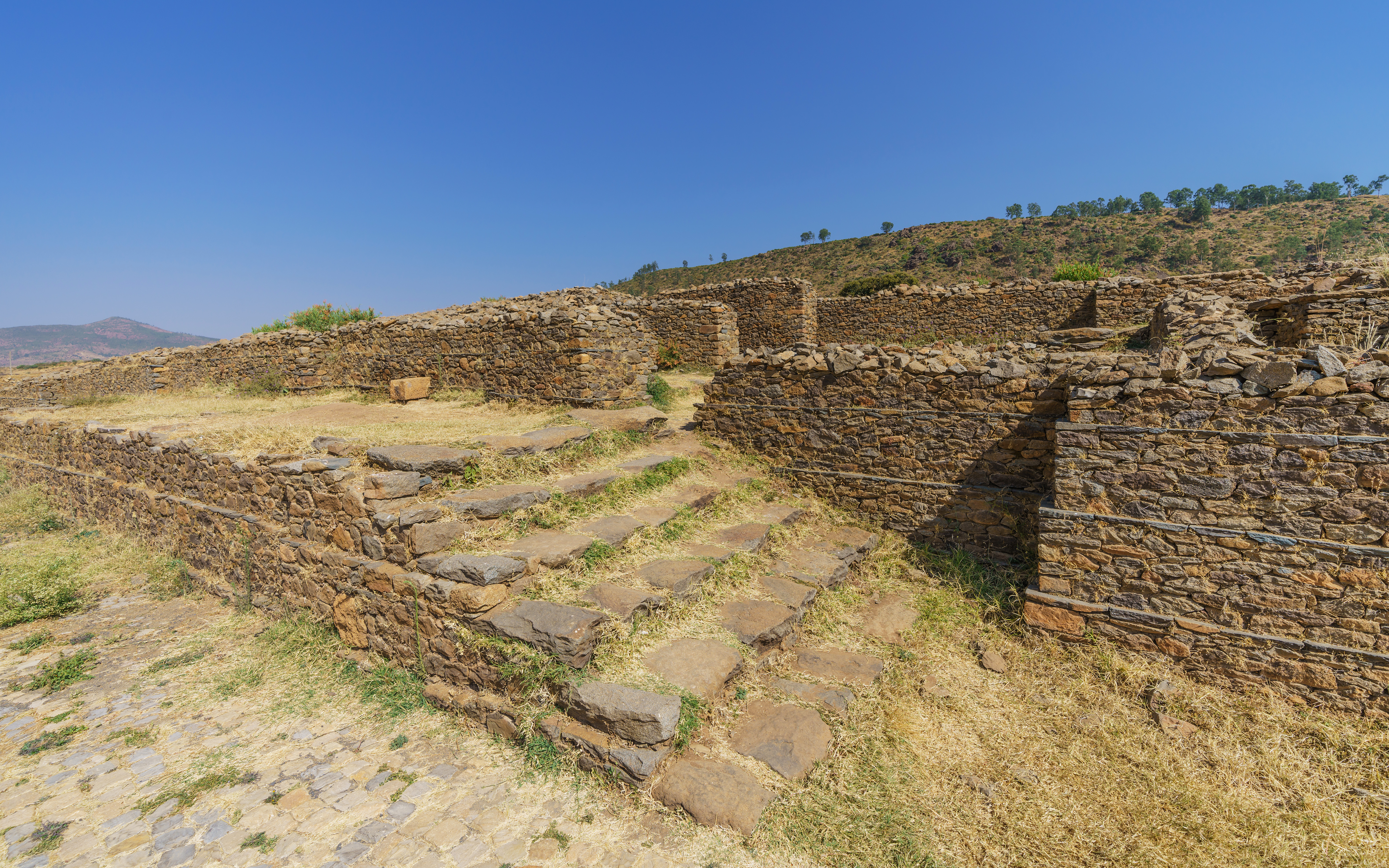

- Location within Ethiopia

General information
- Architectural style: Aksumite
- Location: Axum, Ethiopia
- Coordinates: 14.126839°N 38.706507°E
- Completed: 7th century
- Demolished: Not known

UNESCO World Heritage Site
- Type: Cultural
- Criteria: i, iv
- Designated: 1980 (43rd session)
- Part of: Aksum
- Reference no.: 15

Dungur (or Dungur 'Addi Kilte) is a historic site dated to the 7th century CE, located in the city of Axum in modern Ethiopia. The site comprises the ruins of a large structure built when Axum was the capital of the Kingdom of Aksum. The site is in western Aksum, near a stelae field traditionally associated with queen Gudit. Dungur was declared a World Heritage Site by UNESCO in 1980.

== Description ==
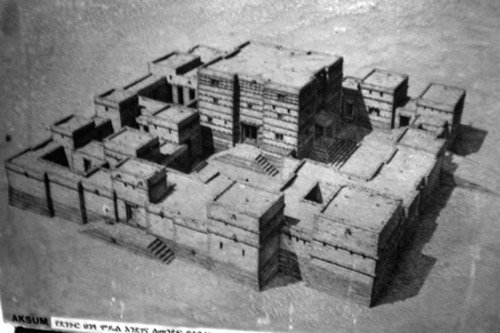
Reconstruction of Dungur

The remains of the Dungur structure and its associated buildings are limited to the lowest levels and the podium, covering about 3,250 square meters. In its heyday, a double staircase led to the entrance of the complex, which opened into one of the courtyards surrounding the central structure.

In the associated buildings a number of stone piers were recovered, "presumably for supporting wooden columns or floors", and brickwork which may be evidence of a hypocaust. However, the purpose of these buildings is unclear. Stuart Munro-Hay notes, "The 'rooms' with stone piers have no doorways, and the piers presumably supported floors, but occasional divisions on the same level do have doorways, implying that not all the lower level was merely a podium for a higher floor level. Possibly some rooms were entered from within by ladders."

== Archaeology ==
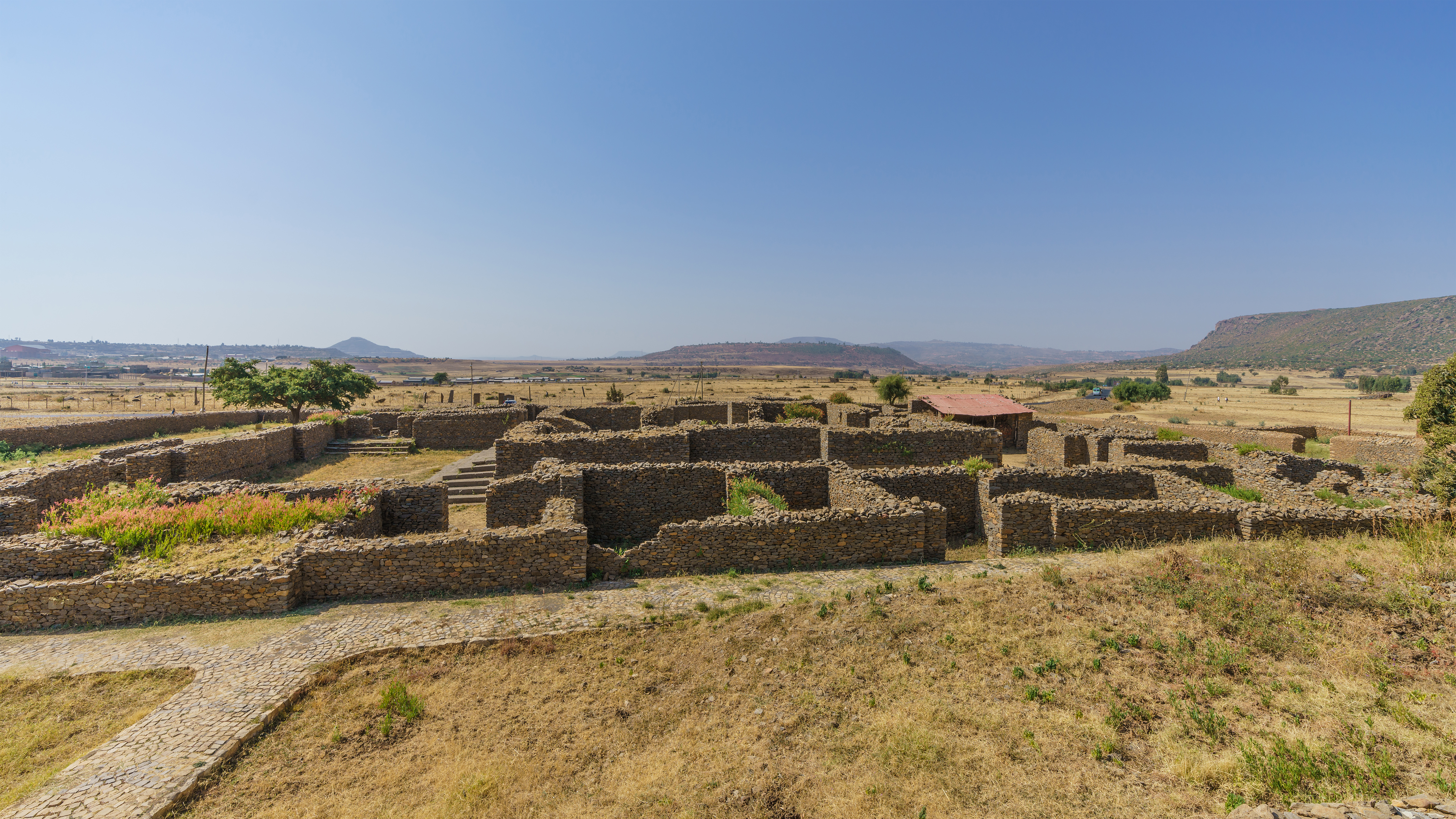
Dungur, with the Gudit stelae field immediately beyond it

S. Puglisi performed the first archaeological excavation in Dungur, excavating a 3 x 5 meter sondage with the intent of revealing its stratification. A later excavation was conducted in 1966–1968 by Francis Anfray, who uncovered a dwelling 250 meters west of Puglisi's trench that he described as a "château" inhabited by one of the city's elite. Based on the evidence from these excavations, Anfray's dwelling was dated to the seventh century; the masonry was similar to the base of St Mary of Zion church (which is part of the original structure that dated from Axumite times), while the floor plan was similar to the layout of the central block of the Ta'akha Maryam palace.
