= Sheba Hargreaves =

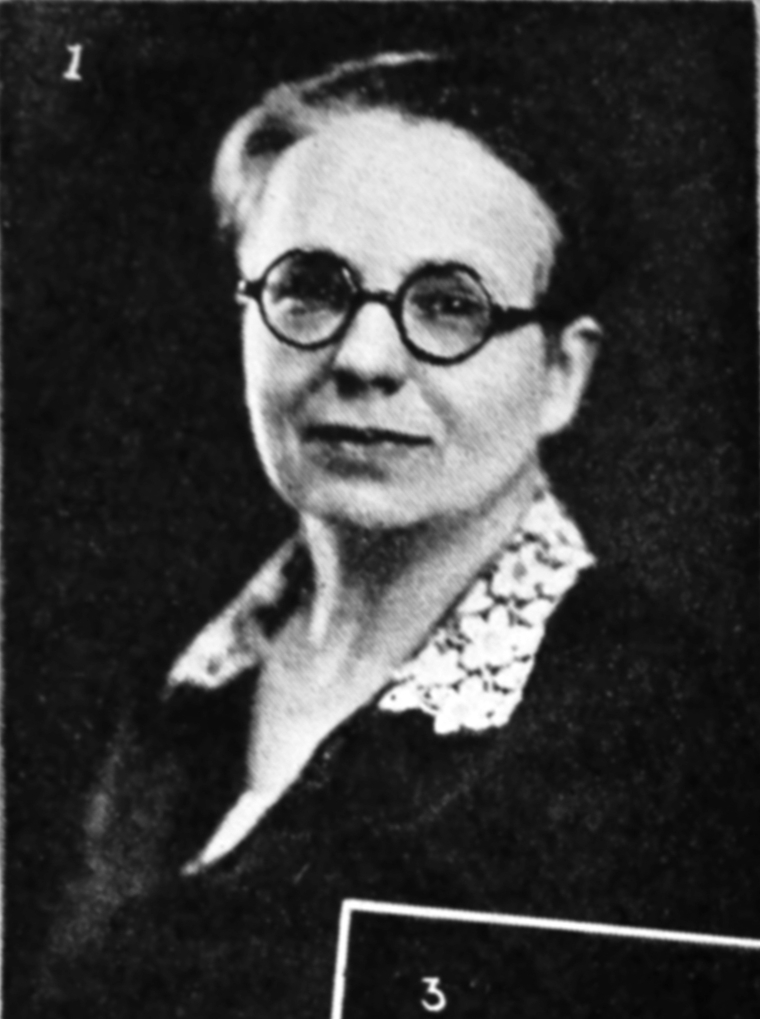
Sheba Hargreaves

Sheba May Childs Hargreaves (November 5, 1882 - 1960) was a writer from Oregon, author of The Cabin at the Trail's End, considered one of the pioneer women of the West.

== Biography ==
Sheba May Childs was born in The Dalles, Oregon, on November 5, 1882, the daughter of Byron Francis and Selena Ann Childs. She was a life-long resident of Oregon and lived at 634 E. 65th St., North, Portland, Oregon.

She graduated from Oregon State Normal School (now Western Oregon University), and was for a time elementary teacher, both in Oregon and California.

She married Fred Hargreaves. Their children were Holden Stephen and Robert Frederic.

As a writer she specialized in the preparation of advertising books and pamphlets. She was the author of De-occultized occultism: showing wherein Western occultism must differ from Eastern occultism : the one founded on activity, the other on passivity (1924), Why mankind is returning to cremation (1924), The Cabin at the Trail's End: Sunrise (1925), a brochure on the hope of immortality, A Story of Oregon (1928), an historical novel, The letters of Roselle Putnam (1928), quaint society letters of Roselle Putnam, among the most interesting material to be found in the archives of the Oregon Historical Society, Ward of the redskins (1929), stories about Native people in the Pacific Northwest, Heroine of the prairies: a romance of the Oregon Trail (1930), The Loop (1931), The Hall of Peace (1934), The Business Side of Writing, Buffalo gals. She was a feature writer for publications such the Oregon Journal and The Oregonian.

She was a member of the Oregon Historical Society.

She died in 1960.

The Sheba May Hargreaves papers, 1928-1935 are hosted at the University of Oregon Libraries, Special Collections and University Archives.
