= Yan Lift =

US-based ski lift manufacturer

Lift Engineering & Mfg. Co.
- Industry: Aerial lift manufacturer
- Founded: 1965; 61 years ago Carson City, Nevada, United States
- Defunct: 1996; 30 years ago
- Fate: Bankrupt
- Headquarters: Carson City, Nevada, United States
- Key people: Jan K. Kunczynski; Les Okreglak
- Products: Ski lifts, Rails (Funicular, Monorail)

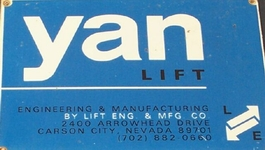
The nameplate found on Lift Engineering's ski lifts.

Yan Lift, incorporated as Lift Engineering & Mfg. Co., was a ski lift manufacturer based in Carson City, Nevada, United States. Founded in 1965 by Polish immigrant and former ski racer Janek Kunczynski, the company became one of the largest ski lift suppliers in North America during the 1970s and 1980s. It built at least 200 fixed-grip chairlifts, 31 high-speed detachable quad chairlifts, and developed the QMC, an early funitel design.

The company came under regulatory scrutiny following a series of equipment failures and fatal chairlift accidents. Following the 1985 accident at Keystone Resort, Yan detachable lifts were widely retrofitted or replaced, and, after further incidents in the 1990s, the company filed for Chapter 11 bankruptcy in 1996. Yan lifts were involved in five deaths and at least 70 injuries, the worst safety record of any ski lift manufacturer operating in North America.

After bankruptcy, the company continued briefly as YanTrak, producing replacement track and cables for the Angels Flight funicular in Los Angeles before ceasing operations in 2001 following the Angels Flight accident. Many of the company's fixed-grip chairlifts remain in service, while only one detachable Yan chairlift remains in operation, at Nazhvan Forest Park in Iran, using POL-X West grips.

== History ==
=== 1965–1985 ===
Lift Engineering was founded by Janek Kunczynski, a Polish immigrant and former ski racer who initially worked at Poma. He left Poma in 1965 and founded the company Lift Engineering to build his own ski lifts. One of his first customers was Squaw Valley. The name "Yan" is the English spelling of his first name, and the brand under which Kunczynski sold his lifts.

The company grew through the 1970s and 1980s. Kunczynski was known for dining with prospective clients (après-ski) instead of just simple negotiating, and would sketch plans out on paper napkins. Another attractive feature to buyers was the price. Kunczynski sold his lifts at prices well below those of larger manufacturers. Kunczynski is also credited with being the first manufacturer of ski lifts to incorporate aesthetics into the design of his equipment, creating sleek designs that were popular with ski resorts.

The company is most noted for designing fixed-grip chairlifts. Kunczynski created a standard system that was intended to be simple to operate and maintain. For example, Yan operator booths contain only two switches: a switch that stops and starts the lift, and one that selects its speed. The main controls were placed in a separate machine room. Lift Engineering was the first company to design and build its own low-voltage DC motor control tailored specifically to the ski lift industry (System 4200 and later Base 10). Yan's tower designs were also overbuilt, meaning that it was possible to turn a triple chair into a fixed quad just by changing the chairs.

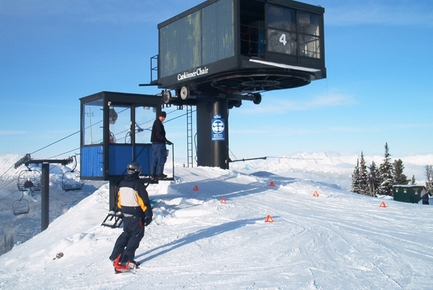
An example of a Yan fixed-grip chairlift; the removed Catskinner triple chair (Ex Lift 4) at Blackcomb, British Columbia

=== 1985–1995 ===
Lift Engineering entered a new market of high-speed detachable chairlifts in the 1980s. Whereas other ski lift firms spent as much as four years developing these lifts, Yan installed its first after only one year of research and development, at June Mountain in California.

By the late 1980s, Lift Engineering was one of the largest suppliers of ski lifts based in North America.

Lift Engineering also was an important player in the funitel market in the late 1980s. The quad mono cable, or QMC, was invented by Kunczynski (US Patent 4,848,241). The lift consisted of four separate loops of cable, strung between the upper and lower stations. Two cables were run in the uphill direction, and two were run in the downhill direction. The cabins would be mounted between the cables. But, because the cables were looped, once the cabins reached the upper station, the cables would loop back downhill not carrying a load. Only one of these lifts was ever built, and first opened to the public in 1988 at June Mountain. The owners allegedly had difficulty getting the cables to run in synchronicity. The lift also developed the same grip problems that occurred on the Yan high-speed quads, and ceased operation in 1996.

== Controversies and accidents ==
Despite questions about safety, Yan managed to sell a total of 31 high-speed quads in the United States and Canada. Many of the lifts have since been retrofitted by companies such as Poma and Doppelmayr. A controversial figure, Yanek Kunczynksi was a Polish immigrant and figurehead of the company. He brought experience from French chair lift making company, Poma to his American company: Lift Engineering. He was known for taking away what he deemed as unnecessary parts and substituting certain equipment for others, examples of this include replacing aluminum towers for steel ones and swapping rubber rings for steel coils. Many blame him for the accidents, though he claims that bad maintenance was the culprits for the lift failures.

Yan high speed lifts were notorious for their grip slippage and sometimes required hours of running in the morning to realign the chairs following slippage over night. This led to nicknames such as "Yankee Slipper" a play on the lifts actual name "Yankee Clipper" now known as the Grand Summit Express at Mount Snow, Vermont.

=== Keystone, Colorado, accident (1985) ===
Potential problems with Yan lifts began to surface as early as December 14, 1985, when the upper bullwheel on the Teller lift at Keystone Ski Resort in Colorado disconnected from the main gearbox shaft. The lift was unique in its design as there was no support underneath the bullwheel. Lift Engineering had explained when the lift first opened the year before that a support beam underneath was not necessary. They claimed the pressure of the system along with the welds would keep the bullwheel in place. Faulty welding would be blamed for the accident. Two people were killed and 47 injured. The Teller lift, and its twin lift, Santiago, were two triple chairlifts constructed in 1984 as part of Keystone's North Peak expansion. Teller was rebuilt by Yan and renamed the Ruby lift, free of charge. Santiago was replaced by a Doppelmayr high speed quad in 1998 and relocated to Big Sky, Montana, while Ruby was replaced by a Poma high speed six pack in 2000.

During the late 1980s, the Colorado Passenger Tramway Safety Board began to question the safety of Yan's lifts. They learned that Kunczynski, in his drive to build affordable ski lifts, regularly sent steel parts to be welded together in ski area parking lots. The Board alleged that Kunczynski's lifts were unsafe. The ski industry blasted the Board and continued to install Yan lifts.

=== Sierra Ski Ranch, (Currently Known As: Sierra-At-Tahoe) California, accident (1993) ===
On April 4, 1993, a 9-year old boy was killed and another child injured when loose bolts and a subsequent deraillment caused two chairs to stack up on Sierra Ski Ranch’s Slingshot lift. The same lift had sent an empty chair to the ground two months prior when a grip failed. Lift Engineering settled a wrongful-death suit after the accident for $1.9 million. Sierra Ski Ranch’s marketing director would later state, “we found they just didn’t withstand the test of time” when the company committed $6 million to replace its three Yan detachables in 1996.

=== Whistler, British Columbia, accident (1995) ===
Yan detachable lifts were subject to a series of accidents, most notably the Quicksilver lift at Whistler Mountain in British Columbia, Canada. The Quicksilver accident killed two and injured eight on December 23, 1995. The accident occurred when the emergency stop was used repeatedly. A chair started sliding downhill and struck the next chair which got stuck on a tower. This continued several times before a total of four chairs fell. The main problems with the Yan high-speed lifts were the chair grips. These were designed so that in order to stay connected to the cable, the chair had to be subject to gravity. The Yan grips, unlike most operating today, did not have high-tension coil springs, but rather rubber "marshmallow" springs that exerted much less force on the cable. The repeated emergency brake application was enough to shake the chairs free of the cable. The majority of government safety inspectors failed to detect these problems.

The Quicksilver chairlift, which served the Whistler Creekside base area, was replaced by the Creekside Gondola in 1997, built by Poma.

== Aftermath ==
Following the accident at Whistler, and reports of grip-slipping at a plethora of other mountains, 15 resorts spent millions of dollars either upgrading, or completely replacing their combined 31 detachable quads in the United States and Canada. June Mountain, the only mountain to use Yan's Type 7 grips in a funitel was forced to shut down the QMC Funitel leaving sole access to the mountain to the J1 lift (A 1960 Riblet double Chair). Doppelmayr, the company that took majority of the replacement contracts was so stretched in resources that 75% of their replacement grips came from Austria instead of their North American manufacturing plant.

POL-X West developed a new version of the YAN-7 detachable grip, the one that was used on the majority of the high-speed lifts, replacing the rubber marshmallow springs with high-tension steel coil springs. The redesign was ordered by a group of British Columbia and Alberta ski resorts that included Silver Star and Lake Louise. This grip also proved unsatisfactory and the lifts were removed from 2002–2004.

Many resorts suffered greatly from the economic burden of having to replace their workhorse lifts, such as contributing one million dollars in retrofit costs to Schweitzer's 1996 bankruptcy, and Sun Valley who had 7 Yan High Speed Quads. In 2019, the second last Yan high speed quad La Roca, located at Espot Esqui in Spain, suffered a catastrophic failure leading to one of the chairs falling off the line. This chairlift had Type 7 grips and the original terminals with replaced chairs. As a result of this, the lift was shut down. On December 6, 2019, Espot opened their new La Roca high-speed quad, built by Leitner. The last Yan detachable lift remaining with Yan grips is at Nazhvan Forest Park, Isfahan, Iran, and uses the POL-X West grips. There are still many fixed grip lifts around the United States and Canada that are made by Yan, with two more in Europe: one in Val D'Isere, France (the Mont Blanc triple) and one in Zakopane, Poland at Polana Szymoszkowa. At one time (c. 1975–1984), Val D'Isere had an entire fleet of Yan chairlifts. All except the Mont Blanc triple were replaced.

== See also ==
- Chairlift
- Gondola lift
- List of aerial lift manufacturers
