= Sylvain Saudan =

Swiss alpine skier (1936–2024)

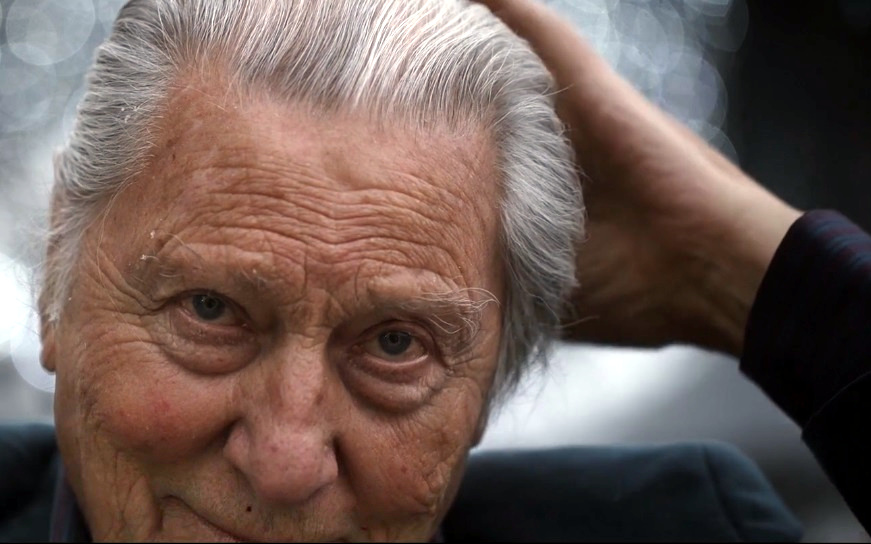
- Saudan in 2021
- Born: 23 September 1936; Lausanne, Switzerland
- Died: 14 July 2024 (aged 87); Les Houches, France
- Occupations: Alpine Skier and Mountaineer
- Known for: Extreme skiing
- Notable work: First ski descent down a 8,000m peak, Gasherbrum I
- Spouse: Marie-José Valençot
- Honours: Saudan Couloir, named after him on Blackcomb Mountain which gives the name to the Saudan Couloir Race Extreme, ski race at Whistler-Blackcomb

Sylvain Saudan (23 September 1936 – 14 July 2024) was a Swiss extreme skier, dubbed "skier of the impossible." He was noted for skiing down large and steep mountains, including those in the Himalayas, North America, Asia, Africa, and Europe. In 1982, he entered the Guinness Book of World Records for descending the highest and steepest slope ever skied.

== Early life and career ==
Saudan was raised near the village of Verbier in Valais, Switzerland, where skiing to school during the winter was the norm. In 1961 at age 25, Saudan qualified as a skiing instructor and high mountain guide.

In the world of high mountain skiing people are usually known for first ascent of high and difficult peaks but he was famous for accumulating 23 first descents, which included 18 of the most known difficult descents. He received great renown in 1967 for his first descent of the Spencer Couloir on the Aiguille du Midi, a route that was considered unskiable. The feat earned him the name "skier of the impossible".

Saudan's crowning achievement came in 1982 when, at age 46, he skied down Pakistan's 26,470-foot (8,070 m)-high Gasherbrum I, or Hidden Peak, in the Himalayas. It was, and possibly still is, the longest 50-degree ski descent ever accomplished and likely the first full descent of an '8,000 meter' mountain. The feat earned him a place in the Guinness Book of World Records for the highest and steepest slope ever skied.

== Technique ==
In order to safely ski these mountains he developed a new technique to "jump turn" on very steep inclines. Normal jump turns would have accelerated the skier and thrown him too far down the mountain so, using long ski poles, Saudan turned by planting a ski pole downhill and, keeping his weight on both skis and leaning back on his heels, he lifted the ski tips up and swivelled them in an arc into the turn. These turns, rhythmically swivelling the skis in arcs left and right, he christened the windscreen wiper turns. His extreme exploits involved considerable preparations, studying the mountain, the snow, and the terrain over an extended period of time.

Saudan practiced for his runs by skiing on rocks as it prepared him for being able to ski on any type of snow conditions.

== Later life and death ==
Saudan was an accomplished guide for heliskiing, one of the first European guides, along with Hans Gmoser, to exploit the Bugaboos in British Columbia in the 1970s, with waist deep powder snow (often 150,000 vertical feet per week or more). He later developed his own line of skis suited for powder skiing. These were relatively short and wide metal skis, designed to be quick turning in powder snow, as well as to be easily loaded outside the helicopters. In 1972, he launched Himalaya Heliski, based in Srinagar offering heliskiing trips in Kashmir region. Over the next decades he would become known as the "father of Heliskiing in Kashmir", recognized for his work to promote skiing in the region. In 2007, aged 71, he survived a helicopter crash in Kashmir.

In 1987, Canada's Whistler Blackomb named the Saudan Couloir after him on Blackomb Peak and launched the Saudan Couloir Ski Race Extreme down the route. Saudan was not consulted for the use of his name, and brought legal charges against Whistler for using it, which lasted decades to conclude. In 2017, Saudan and Vail Resorts ended the long running dispute over the naming rights. Saudan received compensation, the couloir was officially named after him and the ski race returned.

He became a motivational speaker in later life for corporate executives, using his films to demonstrate the "leap in courage it takes to conquer new peaks and new challenges".

Saudan died from a heart attack at home, on 14 July 2024, at the age of 87.

== Timeline of achievements ==
- 1967 – He performed the first descent of the direct 45 degree line of the Couloir Sans Nom on the face of the Rothorn.
- 1967 – He skied the north face of the Piz Corvatsch near St. Moritz, around 1000 meters of vertical at over 45°.
- 1967 – His descent on skis down the 55-degree Couloir Spencer on the Aiguille de Blaitière, Mont Blanc massif.
- 1967 – He skied the Couloir Whymper on the Aiguille Verte.
- 1968 – He climbed then skied back down Couloir Gervasutti on the Mont-Blanc du Tacul fell.
- 1968 – He skied the couloir Marienelli of the Monte Rosa, Pennine Alps.
- 1969 – He skied the North West face of the Aiguille de Bionnassay of the Mont Blanc massif.
- 1970 – He skied the west face of the Eiger, Bernese Alps.
- 1970 – He skied the south face of the Grandes Jorasses.
- 1970 – He skied the couloir of the Tournette on the south west side of Mont-Blanc.
- 1971 – He descended the 50-degree (55 in places), slope of the couloir on the Northeast side of 3419 meter Mount Hood, Oregon, U.S.
- 1972 – He climbed, then at -35 degrees C, descended the south-west face of Denali (Mount McKinley), Alaska Range, highest peak in North America.
- 1972 – He climbed then skied back down Kilimanjaro, the highest mountain in Africa.
- 1976 – He climbed then skied back down 7,135m Nun peak in the Himalayas.
- 1976 – He climbed then skied back down a number of other peaks in Nepal and the Karakoram.
- 1982 – He skied down Pakistan's 26,470-foot (8,070 m)-high Gasherbrum I, or Hidden Peak, in the Himalayas.
- 1986 – On his 50th birthday, he skied down from the 3,776m summit of Mount Fuji, without snow, on scree.

== Quotes ==
- I don't live for the mountain. I couldn't live without her. I live with her. (in Dreyfus, p. 31).
- When you ski down a corridor, you're really edging death with each move that is not perfectly controlled. There's really only one way out: don't fall down. (in Dreyfus, p. 270).
