= Keystone Resort =

Ski area in Colorado, United States

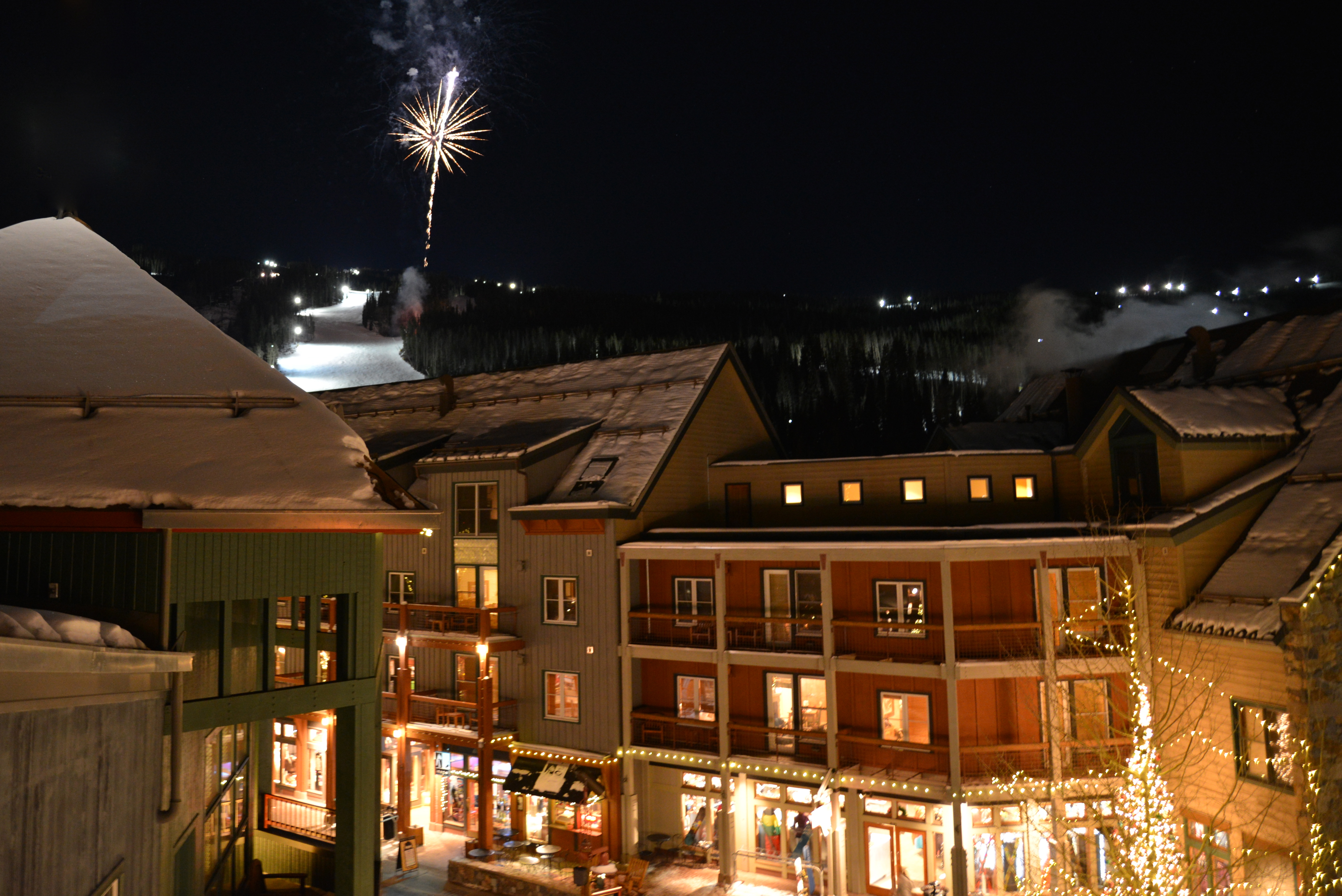
- River Run Village in 2013

- Location in the United States Location in Colorado
- Location: White River National Forest; Summit County, Colorado, United States
- Nearest city: Denver: 70 miles (113 km) via Interstate 70 & U.S. 6
- Coordinates: 39°36′18″N 105°57′15″W
- Status: Operating
- Owner: Vail Resorts
- Vertical: 3,128 feet (953 m)
- Top elevation: 12,408 feet (3,782 m)
- Base elevation: 9,280 feet (2,830 m)
- Skiable area: 3,148 acres (12.7 km^{2})
- Trails: 135 total (19% beginner 32% intermediate 49% advanced)
- Longest run: Schoolmarm – 3.5 miles (5.6 km)
- Lift system: 21 total (2 gondolas, 4 high speed six packs, 3 high speed quads, 1 fixed grip quad, 1 triple chairlift, 2 double chairlifts, and 8 surface lifts)
- Snowfall: 230 inches (19.2 ft; 5.8 m)
- Snowmaking: over 662 acres (2.7 km^{2})
- Night skiing: 15 trails
- Website: keystoneresort.com

Keystone Resort is a ski resort located in Keystone, Colorado, United States. Since 1997, the resort has been owned and operated by Vail Resorts. It consists of three mountains (Dercum Mountain, North Peak, and the Outback) and five Bowls (Independence, Erickson, Bergman, and North and South Bowls). The three mountains are connected by a series of ski lifts and gondolas with access from two base areas (River Run and Mountain House).

== History ==
In the 1940s, Max Dercum left his job as a forestry professor and ski racing coach at Penn State University to work for the Forest Service as a forester and fire spotter in Colorado. He and his wife Edna first lived in Georgetown before settling on a ranch outside the village of Keystone. Max served as a rodeo clown at the Summer Rodeo. Their passion was skiing.

They skied at the Climax Mine, Loveland and Berthoud Passes, Loveland Ski Area, and Steamboat. After a race at Loveland Pass, Max filed mining claims for land around an alpine cirque that he hoped to develop into a ski area. Max served as the head coach of the ski school, and Edna quickly followed as the first female instructor at the school.

Bill Bergman and Max Dercum founded Keystone, which opened 56 years ago in November 1970. Following its fourth season, Keystone was acquired by Ralston Purina in May 1974.

=== 1976 Winter Olympics ===
Independence Mountain was an Olympic finalist and nearly selected for the downhill event of the 1976 Winter Olympics, which were initially awarded to Denver in 1970. Lands owned by the Denver Water Board at the base of Independence Mountain were given consideration by the Forest Service as an alternative second base area. Speculation about conflicts in the Snake River Valley with the lynx reintroduction program stifled further study and land allocation. Prior to the formal expansion of the Keystone ski area onto Independence Mountain, this terrain was under permit by multiple guides and outfitters in the 1970s and 1980s using snowcats and helicopters for alpine skiing.

=== North Peak expansion ===
North Peak opened for skiing in 1984. Two trails, Diamond Back and Mozart, allow access to North Peak from Dercum Mountain. North Peak initially featured seven trails, serviced by two Lift Engineering triple chairlifts. Santiago serviced the North Peak pod, while Teller, now known as Ruby Express, provided egress back to Dercum Mountain. As part of the expansion, a second base area was opened at River Run, with a gondola running all the way to the Summit House. Several trails in the Spring Dipper area, and a new triple chairlift, Erickson, was also introduced.

In 1986, the original River Run Gondola was removed and replaced with a new gondola constructed by Von Roll, reusing the original gondola terminals.

=== 1990s ===
In 1990, Keystone entered the detachable industry as Doppelmayr constructed two high speed quads to replace aging lifts on Dercum Mountain. The Peru Express lift replaced a Heron Poma double, providing access from the Mountain House base area to the Packsaddle Bowl and the west side of the mountain. It was supplemented by the Montezuma Express lift, which replaced a Yan triple chairlift and provided access to all trails on the upper and central part of Dercum Mountain.

In 1991, Keystone opened an expansion into the Outback, located beyond North Peak. Doppelmayr constructed three new lifts to service the expansion. A two-way gondola, known as the Outpost Gondola, was built from the summit of Dercum Mountain over to North Peak. A new high speed quad known as the Outback Express was built to service the Outback trails, and a fixed-grip quad known as the Wayback was built to service two access trails leading to the Outback as well as provide egress from the area.

In 1996, Vail Resorts announced plans to acquire Keystone and Breckenridge's parent company Ralston Resorts Inc. from Ralston Purina. The merger was approved by the U.S. Department of Justice on January 3, 1997.

In 1997, the Erickson triple chairlift on Dercum Mountain was removed and replaced with a new Doppelmayr high speed quad, named the Summit Express, running parallel to the River Run Gondola for its entire length. That same year, a new triple chairlift known as the Ranger was built to open up a learning area at the summit of Dercum Mountain.

In 1998, the Santiago Express was built to replace the Santiago triple chairlift on North Peak.

=== 2000s to 2020s ===
In 2000, the original Ruby (then Teller) lift was removed and replaced with a high speed six pack. The Ruby Express was constructed by Poma and provided faster egress out of North Peak and the Outback.

In 2008, the River Run Gondola, nearing 22 years of continuous service, was retired and replaced with a new gondola. Doppelmayr constructed the replacement River Run Gondola, which had its base area terminal moved from adjacent to the Summit Express to a new location across the river, closer to the main Keystone Village, River Run Village. The new gondola also features a mid-station, allowing guests to upload or download from midway up Dercum Mountain, as well as a new learning area.

In 2014, the Outback Express was given a capacity upgrade to 2,400 pph, using chairs transferred over from the Peru Express and Montezuma Express lifts.

For the 2017 season, Keystone built their second high speed six pack, bringing in Leitner-Poma to replace the Montezuma Express lift. Parts from the old lift were relocated to Beaver Creek Resort and used to construct the Red Buffalo Express.

In 2021, Keystone completed the upgrade of the Peru Express lift, replacing it with a high speed 6-passenger chair. Part of this project also included removing the Argentine Chair, which was an original lift from the resort.

In 2022, Keystone expanded its lift-serviced terrain into the Bergman Bowl, including a new chairlift, new trails, new snowmaking and a ~6000 sq ft expansion of the Outpost Restaurant.

== Statistics ==
=== Elevation ===
- Base: 9,280 feet (2,829 m)
- Summit: 12,408 feet (3,782 m)
- Vertical rise: 3,128 feet (953 m)

=== Trails ===
- Skiable Area: 3,149 acres (12.74 km^{2})
- Trails: 130 total (12% beginner, 39% intermediate, 49% advanced/expert)
  - Bowls: Independence, Bergman, Erickson, North, and South
- Longest Run: Schoolmarm – 3.5 miles (5.6 km)
- Average Annual Snowfall: 230 inches (580 cm)
- Terrain Parks:
  - The A51 Terrain Park, a section of the resort with various features including for trick performance.
  - 51 rails and funboxes.

=== Slope aspects ===
- North: 47%
- East: 13%
- West: 30%
- South: 10%

=== Terrain park ===
Keystone Resort features the "A51 Terrain Park" on Dercum Mountain, which has been noted as one of the more progressive terrain parks in the region.

=== Lifts ===
- Keystone has 13 chairlifts, and 8 surface lifts.

Name	Type	Manufacturer	Built	Vertical (feet)	Length (feet)	Notes
River Run Gondola	Gondola 8	Doppelmayr CTEC	2008	2307	9587	Main lift out of River Run Village to Dercum summit. Has a mid-station for loading and unloading.
Outpost Gondola	Gondola 6	Doppelmayr	1991	1198	7522	Transfer lift that travels between North Peak and Dercum Mountain summits. Riders can load cabins on either side.
Ruby Express	High-Speed Six	Poma	2000	1600	5864	Replaced a Yan triple in 2000, that was previously known as the Teller Lift.
Montezuma Express	High-Speed Six	Leitner-Poma	2017	1667	7031	
Peru Express	High-Speed Six	Leitner-Poma	2021	1558	6332	Upgraded from a high speed quad in 2021.
Bergman Express	High-Speed Six	Leitner-Poma	2023	1078	4722	Named after the Bergman family, that founded Keystone Resort in 1970.
Outback Express	High-Speed Quad	Doppelmayr	1991	1482	5846	
Summit Express	High-Speed Quad	Doppelmayr	1997	2303	9403	Runs parallel to the River Run gondola.
Santiago Express	High-Speed Quad	Doppelmayr	1998	1600	4438	Main lift to the summit of North Peak.
Wayback	Quad	Doppelmayr	1991	1300	3930	
Ranger	Triple	Doppelmayr	1997	193	1022	
A 51	Double	Yan / Riblet / Doppelmayr / Skytrac	1974	953	4190	Dedicated terrain park lift that was shortened in 1976. A 51 has a Skytrac return, Yan towers/drive, Doppelmayr sheaves/lifting frames, and Riblet chairs.
Discovery	Double	Yan	1976	105	685	

- Keystone has 8 surface lifts: Midway Carpets (2), Kokomo Carpet (2), Double Barrel Carpet (2), Triangle Carpet, Ski School Carpet, and the Tubing Hill Carpet.

=== Teller Lift Accident ===
The Teller Lift was a Yan 1000 model triple chair installed in 1984 as part of the North Peak expansion. On December 14, 1985, the upper bullwheel disconnected from the main gearbox shaft, resulting in dozens of lift riders being thrown from their chairs onto the slope below. Two riders were killed and an additional 47 were injured. Faulty welding was blamed for the accident. The lift was rebuilt by Yan as the Ruby Lift, free of charge. Settlements between Yan and injured skiers topped over seven million dollars.

== Activities ==
During the summer, visitors to Keystone resort often participate in hiking, horseback riding, fly-fishing, whitewater rafting, paddle boat and standup paddle board rentals and mountain biking. Additionally, Keystone provides lift access for mountain hiking events and hundreds of miles of single-track mountain biking.

Keystone Resort is also home to two 18-hole championship golf courses, The Ranch and River Run. The Ranch course was designed by Robert Trent Jones Jr. and is situated next to a historic ranching homestead.

In the winter, Keystone offers night skiing, a five-acre resurfaced ice skating lake, sleigh rides, and several fine-dining restaurants.

== Labor Relations ==
=== National Forest System ===
Keystone ski area operates on National Forest System lands under a special use permit from the Forest Service. The 30-year special use permit assigns to the permit holder only a portion of the bundle of rights normally associated with real estate ownership. For the privilege of using federal lands, the ski area pays an annual fee of about one dollar per skier visitor to the U.S. Treasury. Twenty-five percent of those fees are returned to Summit County, Colorado, for roads and schools. The Forest Service approves development plan revisions. The 1984 Land and Resource Management Plan and 2002 Revision, authored by Erik Martin, program manager for ski area administration (1972–2003), WRNF, established the final expanded boundary perimeter for Keystone Resort, including the eventual expansion of developed skiing onto Independence Mountain. The 2002 Forest Plan Revision suggested an aerial transportation corridor and south portal be constructed in the Swan Valley to provide direct access between Keystone ski area and the Town of Breckenridge.

=== Keystone Ski Patrol Union ===
In February 2025, the Keystone Ski Patrol union reached a new agreement with Vail Resorts. The new agreement included wage increases and provisions related to housing assistance and equipment reimbursements.
