= Horstman Glacier =

Glacier in British Columbia, Canada

Coordinates: 50.0947°N 122.8829°W

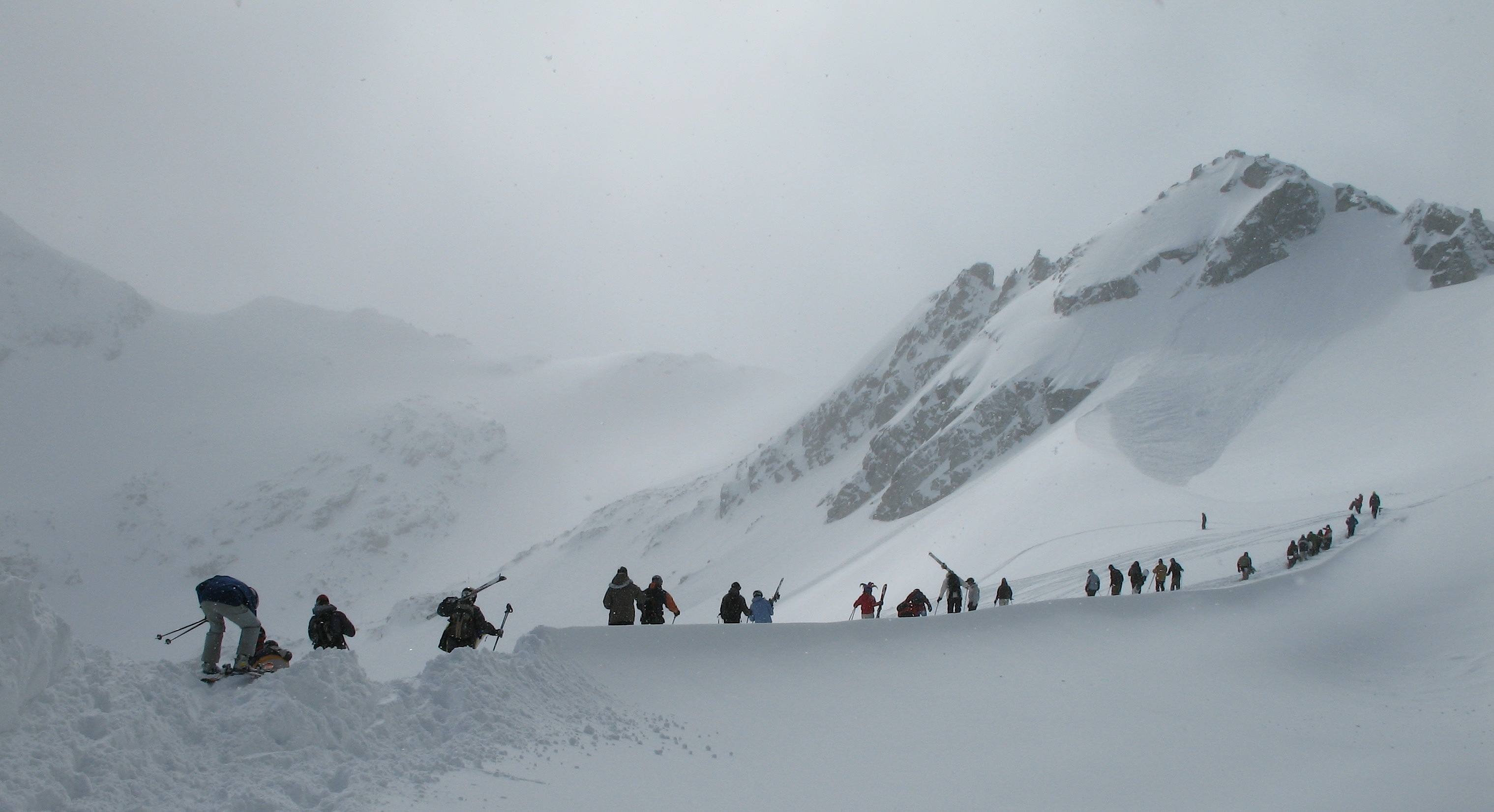
View of the Blackcomb Glacier from the top of Horstman Glacier

The Horstman Glacier is a glacier located on Blackcomb Peak in Garibaldi Provincial Park. During the ski season at Whistler Blackcomb Ski Resort, it is used for skiing and snow riding. It is one of two glaciers in North America used for summer skiing and riding.

== Glacier preservation efforts ==
The Horstman Glacier is the site of a pilot project developing methods to preserve glaciers.

- A blue wooden snow fence has been installed on the ridge above the glacier to trap snow.
- In 2015, four snowmaking machines ("snowguns") began adding more snow to the glacier during the winter.
- A 7.5-megawatt hydroelectric dam, installed in 2010, powers the ski resort and the snowmaking operations.

== Glacier retreat ==
The Horstman glacier has receded substantially, with conditions deteriorating. In 2020 the Horstman T-bar, a ski lift at Whistler Blackcomb operating since 1987, was closed down as the glacier receded.

The retreat of glaciers like the Horstman is mostly attributed to global warming and local changes as a result of rising temperature also furthering the process. Glacier recession is accelerating worldwide.

== See also ==
- Glacial motion – Geological phenomenon
