= Nippon Cable =

Commercial company

Nippon Cable Co., Ltd.
- Native name: 日本ケーブル株式会社
- Type: Private KK
- Industry: Transport equipment
- Founded: Tokyo, Japan (January 4, 1953; 73 years ago)
- Headquarters: 2-11 Kanda Nishiki-cho, Chiyoda-ku, Tokyo, Japan
- Key people: Masayoshi Ohkubo (CEO and President)
- Products: Amusement park rides; Car Parking Systems; Funiculars; Gondola lifts; Incline elevators; Ramp elevators; Ropeways; Ski resorts
- Website: Official website

Nippon Cable Co., Ltd. (日本ケーブル株式会社, Nippon Kēburu Kabushiki-gaisha) is a Japanese corporation headquartered in Chiyoda, Tokyo, and is engaged in the design, production and installation of jig-back and material ropeways, gondola lifts, funiculars, chairlifts, car parking systems, ramp elevators and amusement park rides. The company also owns and operates resorts in Japan and Canada, including a 25% interest in Whistler Blackcomb, the largest ski resort in North America and host of alpine and Nordic skiing events during the 2010 Winter Olympics, and Sun Peaks Resort.

Besides the headquarters in Tokyo, the company has a factory in Narashino, branches in Nagano, Osaka, Sapporo, offices in Fukuoka and service centers in Niigata and Takayama.

The company has been a licensee of Doppelmayr since 1977.

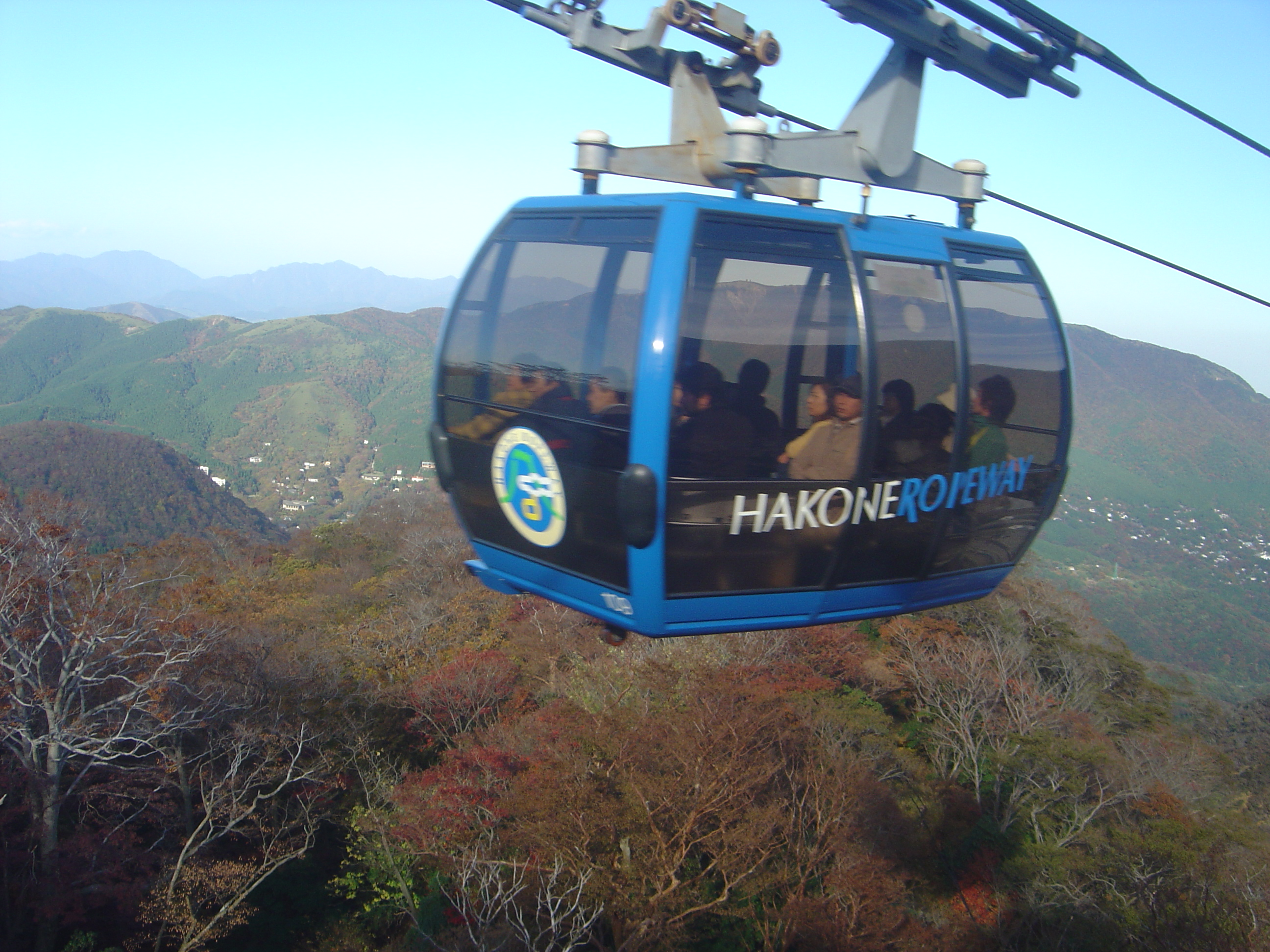
A Nippon Cable-made tramway car part of the Hakone Ropeway
