= Whistler Blackcomb =

Ski resort in British Columbia, Canada

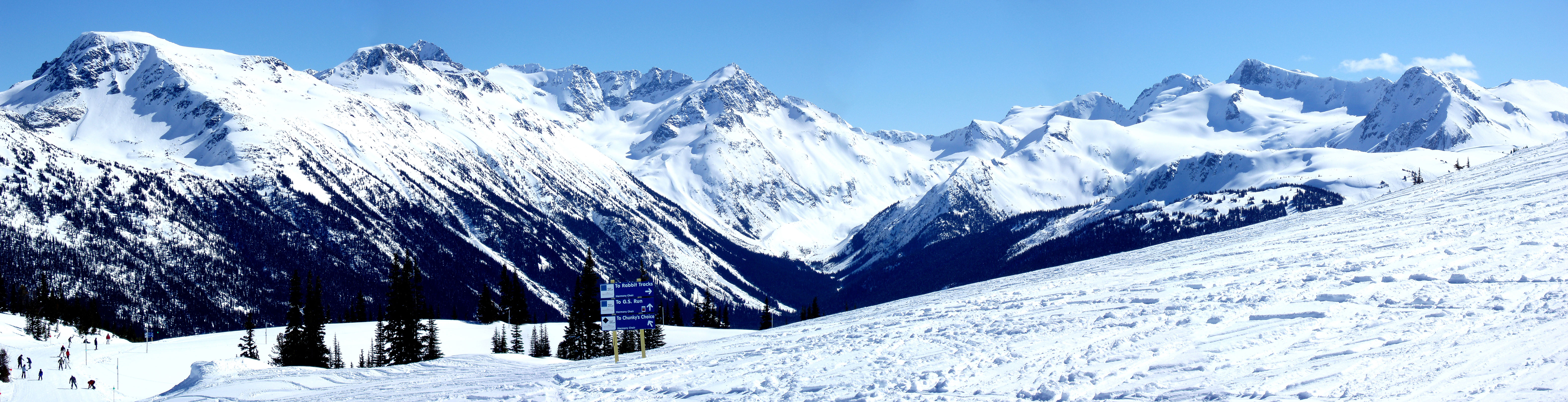
- Panorama of Whistler Blackcomb
- Interactive map of Whistler Blackcomb
- Location: Whistler Mountain and Blackcomb Mountain and Canada
- Nearest city: Vancouver
- Coordinates: 50°06′30″N 122°56′33″W
- Status: Operating
- Owner: Vail Resorts
- Vertical: Whistler: 1,530 m (5,020 ft); Blackcomb: 1,565 m (5,133 ft)
- Top elevation: Whistler: 2,182 m (7,160 ft); Blackcomb: 2,240 m (7,347 ft)
- Base elevation: Creekside: 653 m (2,140 ft); Village: 675 m (2,214 ft)
- Skiable area: 8,171 acres (3,307 ha)
- Trails: 241; 35 – Easiest; 110 – More difficult 35 – Most difficult 20 – Expert
- Longest run: Peak To Creek (Whistler), Green Road (Blackcomb): both are 11 km (6.8 mi)
- Lift system: 34 (Whistler: 19; Blackcomb: 17); 5 gondolas; 1 high-speed eight-pack chairlift; 4 high-speed six-pack chairlifts; 8 high-speed quad chairlifts; 3 triple chairlift; 15 surface lifts
- Lift capacity: 69,939 skiers/hr: Whistler: 36,148; Blackcomb: 33,791
- Snowfall: 11.7 m/year (415 in.)
- Snowmaking: Whistler: 325 acres (131 hectares), 6.8%; Blackcomb: 382 acres (154 hectares), 11.1%
- Website: www.whistlerblackcomb.com

Whistler Blackcomb is a ski resort located in Whistler, British Columbia, Canada. By many measures, it is the largest ski resort in North America and has the greatest uphill lift capacity. It features the Peak 2 Peak Gondola for moving between Whistler and Blackcomb mountains at the top. Attendance at Whistler Blackcomb often surpasses two million visitors a year.

Whistler was originally conceived as part of a bid to win the 1968 Winter Olympics. Although the bid failed, construction started anyway and the resort opened for the first time in January 1966. Blackcomb Mountain, originally a separate entity, opened for business in December 1980. The two resorts underwent a period of intense rivalry through the 1980s and 1990s, with constant upgrades and improvements that were unseen at other resorts. By the mid-1990s, the area was repeatedly named the best resort in many skiing magazines. Intrawest, the BC real estate firm that developed Blackcomb, purchased Whistler in 1997 and fully merged operations in 2003.

Whistler Blackcomb was the centrepiece of a renewed bid on the part of nearby Vancouver for the 2010 Winter Olympics, which they were selected for in July 2003. Whistler Blackcomb hosted the alpine skiing events, including the men's and women's Olympic and Paralympic alpine skiing disciplines of downhill, Super-G, slalom, giant slalom and super combined. In contrast with Cypress Mountain—which hosted the freestyle skiing and all snowboard events, and was plagued with a lack of fresh, natural snow during the Olympics—Whistler Blackcomb had the second-highest snowfall on record with 1,432 cm (over 14 metres) by the end of the 2009-10 season.

Over the next decade, Intrawest expanded by purchasing additional ski resorts across North America, before expanding into golf and other resorts as well. Whistler Village, widely recognized for its livable design, formed the basis of similar Tyrolian-inspired developments at their expanding series of resorts, as well as other resorts that hired Intrawest to build similar developments on their behalf. In 2010, Intrawest sold off much of its 75% interest in Whistler Blackcomb Resort via a public share offering.

In August 2016, the American company Vail Resorts bought Whistler Blackcomb Holdings for $1.39 billion. Nippon Cable's minority interest in Whistler Blackcomb Resort has continued throughout the ownership changes, by way of ownership of a 25% interest of the Whistler and Blackcomb partnerships.

== Description ==
The ski areas at Whistler and Blackcomb are situated on two ridge-lines running roughly northwest to southeast. The two are separated by a deep valley with Fitzsimmons Creek running along the valley floor. The main base area at Whistler Village is located on the northwest end of this valley, where Fitzsimmons Creek flows into the larger Green River, which forms a floodplain running north–south just to the west of the village area. The Sea-to-Sky Highway runs along the Green River valley. The ski runs generally run northwest towards the village area, or into the valley area between the two ridges. A small number of runs are located on the south side of the Whistler ridge, where they run to the Creekside Base area, some distance south of the main Whistler Village.

Whistler Mountain is the basis of the southern of the two ridges, on the right when looking at the Whistler-Blackcomb ski area from Whistler Village. It has a summit elevation of 2,184 meters (7,165 feet). The total vertical drop is 1,530 meters (5,020 feet) and 4,757 acres (1,925 ha) skiable inbound terrain. Whistler is served by a total of 19 lifts; 2 gondolas, 5 high-speed detachable quad chair lifts, 4 high-speed detachable sixpack chair lifts, 2 fixed grip triple chair lifts, 1 T-bar and 7 carpet lifts. It also hosts the drive station for the Peak 2 Peak Gondola, connecting it with Blackcomb mountain to the north. There are 4 on-hill restaurants, as well as a children's ski school. It is served by two base areas: Whistler Creek also known as creekside, the original base on its southwest flank, and Whistler Village on its northwest flank.

Blackcomb Mountain is the northern ridge, on the left when viewed from the village. It has a lift-serviced elevation of 2,240 metres (7,350 feet) at the top of the 7th Heaven chair – Blackcomb Mountain itself is higher at 2,440 meters (8,010 feet), but unlike Whistler, the peak is not lift-served. Blackcomb has a higher skiable vertical, at 1,565 meters (5,135 feet), but less in-bound skiing area at 3,414 acres (1,382 ha). It is served by 15 lifts; 2 gondolas, 6 high-speed quads, 1 fixed-grip triple and 7 surface lifts (1 T-Bar and 5 carpet lifts), as well as the end-station for the Peak 2 Peak. Blackcomb is the location of the world-famous "Couloir Extreme" run, which is one of the top ten steep in-bound runs in the world, according to Skiing Magazine. Originally called the Saudan Couloir by local skiers even before it was part of the ski area, the company eventually had to drop the name when extreme skier Sylvain Saudan complained about the unauthorised use of his name.

The two previously separate ski areas of Whistler and Blackcomb were integrated into one operation in 1997 after Intrawest merged with Whistler Mountain Ski Corporation. Ticketing, pass, and access control systems for the two ski areas were fully integrated in 2003. Together, Whistler and Blackcomb form the largest ski area in North America at 8,171 acres (33 km^{2}). Either mountain alone would be in the top-five in terms of size.

The mountains are accessed via four gondolas and one high-speed eight pack: Blackcomb Excalibur Gondola, Whistler Mountain Village Gondola, and Fitzsimmons Express in the village; the Blackcomb Gondola in Blackcomb Base/Upper Village; and the Whistler Creekside Gondola to the south in the Creekside area. The primary skiing terrain starts about one-third up the mountains. Ski-outs to the valley are usually possible during the months of December through April. The mid- and upper- areas are serviced by 10 high-speed detachable chairs and 5 fixed-grip lifts made by Lift Engineering, Doppelmayr and Poma. Two T-bars service the Horstman Glacier and the Whistler alpine regions and take skiers to the entrance to Blackcomb Glacier. The overall lift capacity, 65,507 skiers per hour, is the greatest in North America.

Before 2008 the only connection between the two mountains was via the village. The opening of the Peak 2 Peak Gondola on 12 December 2008 connected the two mountains at approximately 1,800 m (5,900 ft). The lift has a total length of 4.4 km (2.7 mi) and the longest unsupported span for a lift of its kind in the world at 3.02 km (1.88 mi) while also having the highest ground clearance for a lift of its kind, 436 m (1,430 ft) above the valley floor.

Whistler Village, which is part of the Resort Municipality of Whistler, a geo-political entity not directly associated with the resort company's operation, is situated at the base of the Whistler Mountain Village Gondola and Blackcomb Excalibur Gondola. The village incorporates community services, shops, entertainment venues, restaurants, bars, hotels, condominiums and vacation properties. The village is 675 m (2,215 ft) above sea level, and is located 137 km (85 mi) from Vancouver International Airport.

== History ==
=== Early visitors ===
The valley area between Whistler and Blackcomb was first surveyed and documented in 1858 by Hudson's Bay Company men looking for an alternate route into the Cariboo area further north. Although little-used at the time, the route later became one of the many paths used during the Gold Rush at the turn of the century. Known as the Pemberton Trail, the route followed a path similar to the Sea-to-Sky Highway, leading past the Whistler area to the present-day town of Pemberton. In the 1860s British Naval surveyors named the mountain "London Mountain," but it soon garnered the nickname "Whistler" because of the shrill whistle made by the Western hoary marmots who lived among the rocks. Four lakes paralleled the route of Trail, the highest then being known as Summit Lake. However, there was another Summit Lake in British Columbia, and in 1910 the name was changed to its current form, Alta Lake.

One of the first permanent residents in the Alta Lake area was trapper John Millar, who set up a cabin next to the trail just south of the base of the mountain. During a trip to sell furs in Vancouver in 1911, Millar stopped at the Horseshoe Bar & Grill for dinner. The cook was Alex Philip from Maine, and Millar invited Philip to join him for dinner. Millar was a storyteller, and during the conversations that followed, he invited Philip to visit the Alta area. Alex and his wife Myrtle visited what was then known as Summit Lake several times over the next few years, and in 1913 they purchased 10 acres (40,000 m^{2}) of land on the northwest corner of Alta Lake for $700.

=== Rainbow Lodge and other early resorts ===
By 1914, the Philips' Rainbow Lodge fishing resort was completed with four bedrooms, a large living/dining area and a kitchen. The resort was named for the rainbow trout that were the main attraction of the resort. That same year, the Pacific Great Eastern Railway (PGE) reached the lake from Squamish. Executives of the PGE suggested the Lodge host fishermen from Vancouver, which was now less than two days away (from three or more) via steamship to Squamish and then the PGE to Alta Lake. A standard rate of $2 for a week was applied, and the first group arrived with 25 people. The resort was a hit. Millar left when the railway arrived, looking to get further away from civilization.

Building followed demand, and over time the lodge grew to include an additional 45 buildings (cabins, tennis courts, general store, post office) and could accommodate 100 people. It became the most popular west coast resort for 30 years. The Philips operated the Lodge until 1948 when they sold it to Alec and Audrey Greenwood. The main Lodge burnt down in 1977, but today the area has been preserved as Rainbow Park. The Philips both remained in the valley until their deaths. Alex died in 1968 at age 86, and Myrtle died in 1986 at age 95.

Following the successful launch of Rainbow Lodge, several other tourist resorts set up in the valley. Russell Anderson Jordan opened the Alta Lake Hotel, which burned down in 1930, and replaced it with Jordan's Lodge on nearby Nita Lake. Bert and Agnes Harrop built Harrop's Point in the 1920s. This became the Cypress Lodge in 1945 under its then-owner Dick Fairhurst, who built new cabins and a main lodge in the early 1960s. In 1972 the property was purchased by the Canadian Youth Hostel Association and it remained the Whistler Hostel until it was closed in 2010 when the association (now Hosteling International) opened a new, larger hostel. The original building is still standing today, home to the point artists' centre and the Whistler sailing club. Cecilia and John Mansell moved to Alta Lake in 1945 and built the Hillcrest Lodge near today's Lakeside Park on Alta Lake. They sold it in 1965 to the Mason family and others who operated it as Mount Whistler Lodge for skiers. The main lodge was burnt in a fire practice by the fire department in 1986.

There was some commercial use of the London Mountain area as well. Logging had been carried out for some time, but the arrival of the railway in 1914 made this much more profitable and for several years there were a few sizable mills and lumber operations: The Barrs at Parkhurst Mill on Green Lake (to the north), and the Gebharts with the Rainbow Lumber Company on Alta Lake. The fur trade remained for some time, later supplanted by a mink and marten farm. Jimmy Fitzsimmons ran a prospecting support company, which led to mining surveys up Fitzsimmons Valley. The shafts can still be found on the Singing Pass trail.

=== Olympic dreams ===
In 1960, the Canadian Olympic Association visited the west coast looking for potential sites for a future 1968 Winter Olympics. They initially looked at a site on Diamond Head just north of Squamish, which was already developed to the extent of a single chairlift. However, they concluded that the area simply couldn't be developed properly, "it just wasn't the right terrain for a world-class resort." Franz Wilhelmsen, a local businessman who had married into the Seagram family, had already come to the same conclusions when he had been scouting areas for a new ski resort. He met with the COA and convinced them to look further north in the London Mountain area, "And they were impressed."

Encouraged by their positive reviews, Wilhelmsen organized the Garibaldi Olympic Development Association (GODA) to make a formal bid. At this time there was no road, no electricity, and no piped water or sewer in Alta Lake. Their bid for the Olympics was unsurprisingly rejected, and the Canadian bid was given to Calgary, who came in a close second place to Grenoble. Undaunted, Wilhelmsen decided to press ahead with development of a resort.

In 1962, the Garibaldi Lifts Limited was formed with Franz Wilhelmsen as president. It had two main objectives, to finance and supervise required land/business studies, and to erect and operate ski lifts on London Mountain. The company had little experience in ski operations, so they hired Willy Schaeffler, a well known developer, to help them. Schaeffler proved as enthusiastic about London Mountain as COA and GODA had been. Schaeffler returned and wrote a good feasibility study about the Alta area, which had no mining claims.

From 1962 to 1965, Garibaldi Lifts raised funds and began development of the ski area on the south side of the mountain. The government agreed that they would set aside a 56-acre (230,000 m^{2}) plot at the base of the mountain for Garibaldi Lifts to buy, and agreed to bring the highway to the base of the mountain if they could raise enough money. By 1965, they had reached their goal of raising $800,000 and started planning for development. However, they were not happy with the name, and on August 27, 1965, London Mountain officially became Whistler Mountain.

By 1965, the Provincial Government had completed a narrow gravel road from Vancouver. Electricity arrived the same year with the installation of a substation along the lines from Bridge River. Everything was in place, and the Alta area became a hive of development. GODA made a bid for the 1972 Winter Olympics, but Banff won again and eventually lost to Japan.

=== Whistler opens ===
By the fall of 1965 the ski area featured a four-person gondola to the mountain's mid-station, a double chairlift to the alpine tree line (the Red Chair), and two T-bars, all provided by GMD Mueller. In addition, a day lodge was constructed and six ski runs cut into the hill. Whistler officially opened for skiing for the first time on January 15, 1966. The new mountain won instant acclaim for its vertical drop, good snow conditions, and huge alpine area. The only problem at the time was the road, it was a dirt logging track, which was only plowed on Saturday, to the detriment of Friday travelers.

With real infrastructure in place, in 1968 GODA made another bid for the 1976 Winter Olympics, and this time the joint Vancouver/Garibaldi won the Canadian nomination. However, in 1970 when Montreal won the voting for the 1976 Summer Olympics, Vancouver/Garibaldi was removed from further consideration and the games eventually went to Denver, Colorado. In a stunning turn of events, Denver turned down the games after winning the bidding. The games were then offered to the other North American entry, Vancouver/Garibaldi, but political turmoil due to the recent change in government led to their bid being withdrawn as well, and in desperation the IOC returned the games to Innsbruck for a second time in a row.

The gravel road was paved to Whistler in 1966, and on to Pemberton in 1969. The Blue and Green chairlifts were added in 1970, providing access to additional terrain. In 1972 these were joined by the Olive and Orange chairlifts. A parallel lift to the Green Chair to alleviate crowds came in 1974, and the Little Red Chair came in 1978. The Roundhouse, an on-mountain lodge and restaurant, was completed in 1980. This new lodge provided respite for cold skiers who had survived the long ride up on the Red Chair.

=== Whistler Village ===
In 1974, the provincial New Democratic Party of British Columbia was interested in developing tourism and took a number of steps affecting Whistler. At the time, the Alta Lake area was overdeveloped, so the government instituted a development freeze while they studied the problem. The only solution was to continue development in another location. They quickly decided to focus on the table between Whistler and Blackcomb, about 4 km to the north of the existing facilities on Alta Lake. At that time this was the site of the Alta Lake dump, and the remains of a Volkswagen Van are still buried under the modern village.

In 1975, the Resort Municipality of Whistler (RMOW) was formed, the first Resort Municipality in Canada and also the first place in British Columbia since Canadian prohibition where bars were allowed to be open on Sunday. The act also created the Whistler Village Land Company who would oversee all development of the new Whistler Village. In 1977 the provincial government named Al Raine the Provincial Ski Area Co-ordinator, in charge of expanding BC's skiing capabilities. Raine was previously National Coach for the Canadian Women's Ski Team, and was married to famous Canadian skier Nancy Greene. Raine saw the potential in developing Blackcomb Mountain, then part of the Garibaldi Provincial Park, and joined the Whistler city council. The Blackcomb area was currently zoned for logging, but Raine and Greene successfully lobbied the government to remove the zoning and allow development as a ski area.

In 1977, the Municipality hired Sutcliffe Griggs Moodie Development Consultants to design a layout for Whistler Village's development. However, their design was considered too conventional and allowed too much car traffic. Raine recommended Eldon Beck, who had been the primary designer at Vail, celebrated for its layout. Beck's designs included a pedestrian Main Street Village Stroll and an elevated covered walkway system, limiting all vehicles to the outside of the developed area. To this day the village retains this basic design in spite of dramatic expansions, and has won worldwide acclaim in architecture circles.

In January 1978, 53 acres (210,000 m^{2}) of crown land were given to the Whistler municipality to develop the town centre. The first sod for the village was turned on August 18, 1978, by first Mayor Pat Carleton. By 1979, many amenities were in place, including Municipal Hall, Fire Hall, Health Care Centre, and Elementary School. Phase 1 expansion included 11 parcels in the modern Village Square area, including the Whistler Conference Centre, a variety of hotels, restaurants, grocery store, hardware store, etc. An enormous underground garage was built to support all of the buildings in the area, completed before any construction could start above it. The first hotel, the Blackcomb Lodge, anchors the Village Square area to this day.

=== Blackcomb opens ===
Blackcomb Mountain logo, 1980–1985. The green leaf represents Aspen's ownership. The red and black skis were common to early marketing.

In 1978, a call for bids was issued to develop Blackcomb for skiing. The bidding to develop Blackcomb was contested by two companies, the Aspen Skiing Company, and the newly formed Blackcomb Skiing Enterprises (BSE). Aspen, having recently developed the Fortress Mountain Resort in Alberta, won the contest. A new company, Fortress Mountain Resorts, was formed with a 50–50 partnership between Aspen and the Business Development Bank of Canada. The new competition, paid for partially by tax dollars, was not initially appreciated by Whistler.

Initial development of the mountain included four triple chairlifts (later named Cruiser, Stoker, Catskinner and Fitzsimmons) and one double chairlift, all supplied by Lift Engineering (Yan Lifts). The double chair was installed on the lower Gear Jammer run where the tube park is located today and was used as a beginner chair at a reduced speed. This area was also the first area to get permanent underground snow making pipes supplying snow making guns up the south side of the run. At the time the lifts were referred to only by number.

Blackcomb opened for skiing on December 6, 1980, along with the newly constructed village. To ensure guests could continue to easily access Whistler from the new village, Whistler added three Yan triple chairlifts for the same season; the Village, Olympic, and Black Chairs which met up with the top of the Orange chair at the top of the men's downhill course. Whistler's original base at Alta Lake began to be referred to as Whistler Creek, or Creekside, after the creek that runs through the area.

=== Competition and buildout ===
Throughout the 1980s the two ski areas competed strongly for ticket sales among the village visitors, which led to a rapid buildout of new lifts that opened new areas and improved ride times.

In 1982, "Chair 6" (later rebranded Jersey Cream) opened in the Horstman Creek drainage on Blackcomb. Whistler cut new trails along the northern flank of the mountain. In 1983, Blackcomb acquired a used T-Bar from Fortress Mountain and installed it on a south-facing slope, in full view of Whistler Mountain. This 7th lift was coined the Seventh Heaven T-Bar and gave access to high alpine and glaciated terrain. It also gave Blackcomb the highest lift-serviced vertical drop of any ski area in North America, with the top of the lift at 7,348 feet (2,240 m). Blackcomb promoted themselves as the "Mile High Mountain".

Whistler responded in 1986 with the opening of the Peak Chair to the summit of Whistler Mountain at 7,160 feet (2,180 m), acquiring a Poma triple chairlift from the closed Pikes Peak ski area in Colorado. Although not as high as Seventh Heaven, this lift opened up Whistler Mountain's alpine terrain, and allowed access to the Harmony Bowl area. The new terrain made Whistler the largest alpine ski area in North America.

Skiers could buy a Blackcomb pass, a Whistler pass, or a Dual Mountain pass. Locals loved when tourists would ask "Where is Dual Mountain?"

=== Intrawest buys Blackcomb ===
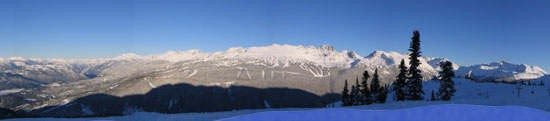
Blackcomb Mountain, as seen looking north from Whistler Mountain. The trails served by Seventh Heaven are seen face-on just right of mid-frame, the upper half of these trails are not obvious in the large "bowl" along the top of the peak. The majority of Blackcomb's trails run down the slope to the left, and are not easily visible in this picture.

In 1986, Blackcomb's assets and real estate rights were bought by fledgling real estate developer Intrawest. Intrawest was an early developer of timeshare listings, and saw the potential in developing the ski resort with condominium assets as a timeshare destination.

Intrawest immediately carried out massive upgrades on Blackcomb. They started by moving the Seventh Heaven T-Bar across the ridge to the Horstman Glacier, still running up to the peak, and supplemented it with the Showcase T-Bar to service Blackcomb Glacier. Doppelmayr replaced Seventh Heaven in its original alignment with a high-speed quad chairlift, and built two additional high-speed quads, Wizard and Solar Coaster, which cut the ride time from the base area to Rendezvous from 45 minutes to 15. The Rendezvous Restaurant was renamed Base 2 and the moniker moved to the restaurant at the top of Solar Coaster and Catskinner.

=== Renewed competition ===
In response to Blackcomb Mountain's construction of three high-speed quads, Whistler Mountain undertook one of the biggest ski-lift construction projects ever realized in Canada at the time, the construction of the Whistler Express Gondola. Carrying passengers 1,157 m (3,796 ft) vertically and 5 km (3.1 mi) horizontally over 63 support towers, the lift opened on November 24, 1988. In 1990 Whistler began upgrading its aging fleet of fixed grip chairlifts with the addition of its first high-speed quad chairlift. The Green Chair Express, which replaced the two Green Chairs, was built by Lift Engineering (Yan), and substantially cut long lift queues in the Green area of the mountain. A year later, Whistler Mountain replaced three double chairlifts and the original Creekside gondola with two high-speed quad chairlifts, the Quicksilver Express and Redline Express lifts, also built by Lift Engineering. In 1994, the Blue Chair was removed and replaced with a Poma high speed quad named the Harmony Express, providing access to Little Whistler Peak.

In 1994, Blackcomb made what would be its last major lift expansion until 2018 with the replacement of the lower mountain triple chairlifts. Stoker was replaced with a high speed quad in a longer alignment known as the Excelerator Express, while Fitzsimmons and Cruiser were replaced with the two-stage Excalibur Gondola, running from Whistler Village to the base of Excelerator with a mid-station near the top of the former Fitzsimmons lift. The second is dubbed by some as the "gondola to nowhere" since it does not connect with any restaurant or access additional terrain. However, in combination with Excelerator, it allowed rapid access to Blackcomb for Whistler Village traffic, who previously had to take three or four chairlifts to Rendezvous (Fitzsimmons, Stoker, Cruiser, and Jersey Cream, with 3 of those being slower chairs; or Fitzsimmons, Wizard and Solar Coaster). Excelerator also opened up a vast area of intermediate-difficulty terrain to the left of Solar Coaster and below Jersey Cream that was previously neglected and under-utilized, because skiers who traveled those slopes frequently had to go all the way to the bottom of the mountain, which was over-skied and icy.

This competition had driven development of the two mountains at a rate no other resorts could come close to matching. In 1992, Snow Country Magazine voted Whistler the Number One Ski Resort in North America. Similar No. 1 rankings quickly followed from other major magazines, and between 1992 and 2000 it won No. 1 ranking from one of the major magazines every year. In 1996, it became the only resort in history to be simultaneously named No. 1 by Snow Country, SKI and Skiing magazines.

=== Intrawest buys Whistler ===
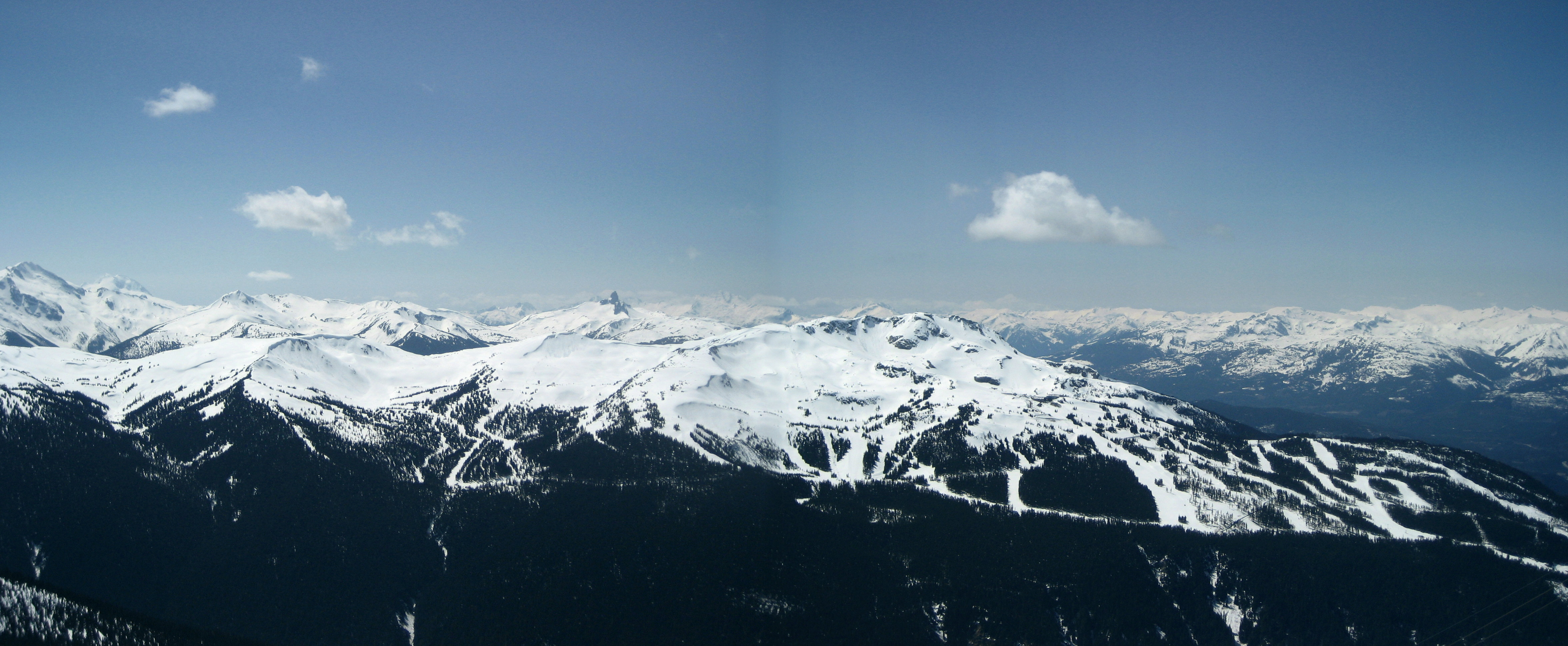
Whistler Mountain, as seen looking south from Blackcomb Mountain. The original Whistler area starts mid-frame and extends down and to the right. Whistler Peak is just to the right of the fold. To the left of the peak is the Harmony Bowl area, Little Whistler Peak, and then the recently opened Symphony Bowl. The Black Tusk can be seen in the distance between Whistler Peak and Little Whistler.

In 1997, the Whistler Mountain Ski Corporation was also bought out by Intrawest.

Like their expansion on Blackcomb, Intrawest immediately started a major build-out on Whistler. Following a deadly accident on Quicksilver in December 1995, all three of Whistler's Yan high speed quads were replaced. A new Creekside Gondola was constructed by Poma for the 1996–97 season to replace Quicksilver. In 1997, Doppelmayr constructed new high speed quads to replace the Redline and Greenline chairs, respectively named the Big Red Express and Emerald Express. These lifts received new terminals and chairs, but reused the predecessor lifts' towers. The original Roundhouse was demolished and a new lodge built in its place. Around this time Intrawest began marketing the two mountains as one large ski area under the name "Whistler-Blackcomb". On April 20, 1999, Whistler Blackcomb became the first North American ski resort to top 2 million skier visits in one season.

1998 saw the replacement of the Peak Chair with a high-speed quad. The original Peak Chair was renamed Franz's Chair and moved parallel to Big Red with a return station approximately halfway up Big Red's lift line. Franz's runs primarily in early and late season, when lower altitudes are not well covered. In 1999, the Black Chair was replaced with a high speed quad, the Garbanzo Express, running on a longer alignment starting next to the Whistler Village Gondola's midstation that eliminated the need for guests skiing this terrain to ride the Olympic Chair. The Fitzsimmons Express was added in 2000, following the line of the long-gone Village Chair and roughly paralleling the lower part of the gondola. The top of Fitzsimmons and the bottom of Garbanzo are co-located in the Village Gondola Olympic station area, providing extra lift capacity from the Whistler Village to the top of the mid-mountain zone in addition to the gondola itself. It was the second lift with the Fitszimmons name, the original lift being a triple chairlift replaced by Stage 1 of the Excalibur Gondola in 1994.

Starting in 2000, Intrawest started redeveloping the Creekside area with new village layout. Throughout, Intrawest also extensively developed the summertime attractions, notably golf and mountain biking. Today, Whistler Blackcomb averages 2 million visitors during the ski season, but another 2.5 during the summer.

Whistler Blackcomb's 2006–07 season saw Doppelmayr construct the Symphony Express, a high speed quad that begins towards the bottom of the Symphony Amphitheater and carries riders to the top of Piccolo. One of the original names suggested for this lift was Piccolo Express.

A more ambitious upgrade was the Peak 2 Peak Gondola, opened to provide a direct connection between the Roundhouse on Whistler and Rendezvous on Blackcomb. Peak-to-Peak opened for the first time on December 12, 2008, but low snowfall meant it was rockbound at the time. The first summer operation day was June 6, 2009.

=== Renewed Olympic bid ===
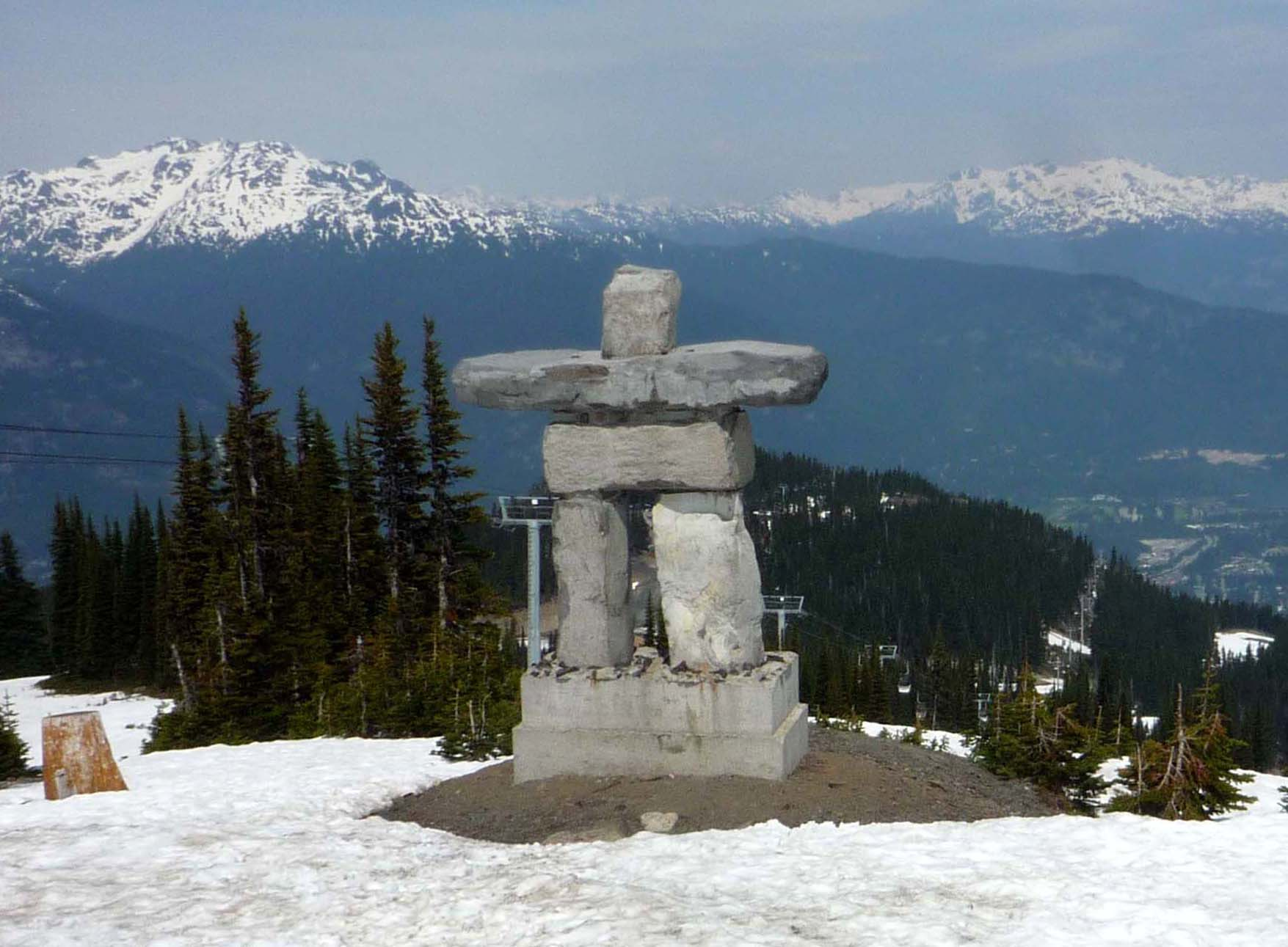
A statue of Ilanaaq, logo of the 2010 Olympics, located at the top of the Whistler Village Gondola on Whistler Mountain

As Whistler Blackcomb continued to win awards – eight consecutive by 2000 – the resort formed the basis of a renewed Olympics bid, this time for the 2010 Winter Olympics. Calgary also bid for the Canadian entry, as their equipment from the 1988 Winter Olympics was already in place and allowed them to offer a low-cost bid, as did Quebec City, which lost the 2002 bid. Calgary was eliminated in close voting on November 21, 1998, and Vancouver-Whistler won the second round of voting on December 3. In IOC voting Pyeongchang, South Korea won the initial round, which eliminated Salzburg, but in the second round on July 2, 2003, they won every one of Salzburg's supporters and bested Pyeongchang 56–53.

=== Reorganization ===
In 2006 Intrawest was purchased by the alternative asset management firm, Fortress Investment Group. Three weeks before the opening of the 2010 Olympics, Fortress failed to make payment on its loan used to buy out Intrawest. This caused its creditors to force Intrawest to divest itself of several of its resort holdings in 2009 and 2010 which included a partial sale of Whistler Blackcomb, in order to reduce its debt load. This was achieved through a public offering of shares of Whistler Blackcomb Holdings Inc on the Toronto Stock Exchange in 2010. The net outcome of the reorganization is that Whistler Blackcomb Holdings is the managing partner and controls 75% of the partnerships which own the assets of Whistler Blackcomb. The remaining 25% of the partnerships are owned by Nippon Cable. Intrawest sold its remaining 24% stake in Whistler Blackcomb to KSL Capital Partners in 2012.

=== 2010 Olympic Games ===
For the 2010 Winter Olympics, Whistler hosted the alpine skiing events. The men's skiing took place on the Dave Murray Downhill course, while women's skiing took place on a new course, which started on Wild Card, cut across Jimmy's Joker to Franz's Run and connected at the bottom of the Dave Murray Downhill. In order to serve the spectators and judges who needed to travel only to the timing area a short distance above the Creekside base, a temporary high-speed quad was built by Doppelmayr, known as the Timing Flats Express, in the Creekside base. This alleviated demand on the Creekside Gondola and other lifts that served the starting areas, much higher up the mountain. After the Olympics, it was dismantled and sold to Sunshine Village, Alberta and replaced the Strawberry chair.

In preparation for the Games, Google Maps launched a Google Maps Street View partnership with Whistler to map out the various Olympic venues and many of the ski runs there. The imagery was taken with cameras mounted on the back of snowmobiles and included panoramas from the Dave Murray Downhill run to the peak of Whistler and to the top of 7th Heaven.

Blackcomb hosted the bobsled, luge and skeleton events at The Whistler Sliding Centre. Whistler Olympic Park hosted Olympic and Paralympic biathlon, cross-country skiing, Nordic combined and ski jumping, some distance to the south of the Creekside area in the Callaghan Valley.

The British Columbia government paid $600 million for major upgrades to the Sea-to-Sky Highway, which carried the majority of visitors to the alpine sites.

Notable accomplishments for Whistler athletes in the 2010 Olympic Games: Ashleigh McIvor won the first gold ever in Ski Cross, an inaugural Olympic event; Maëlle Ricker won gold in Snowboard Cross; Siblings Mike and Britt Janyk competed in alpine skiing events on the mountain they grew up skiing; Ski cross athlete Julia Murray, daughter of Dave Murray, competed in her first of likely many Olympic Games.

=== 2010s ===
Summer 2010 had two lift construction projects at Creekside Base. The Timing Flats Express, used for passenger transport for the games, was removed and rebuilt as the Strawberry Express at Banff Sunshine in Alberta. The second project was the construction of the Kadenwood Gondola, providing access to the Kadenwood Estate Homes from the Creekside base. Built by Doppelmayr-CTEC, it is a pulse gondola with 8 passenger cabins in two groups of 2.

Whistler Blackcomb announced plans on January 18, 2013, regarding plans for two high-speed detachable chairlift installations for the 2013–2014 season. The Harmony Express on Whistler was replaced with a high speed six pack constructed by Doppelmayr, upgrading its capacity from 2,400 to 3,600 persons per hour. The original lift was reinstalled in the Crystal Ridge zone of Blackcomb and renamed the Crystal Ridge Express, replacing the triple chairlift that had previously served this area. While the Crystal Ridge Express ends at the same location as that of the removed triple at Crystal Hut, it starts lower down the mountain on the Blackcomb Glacier Road near the base of Rock n' Roll. The lift line had been cut many years prior in anticipation of construction, and allows for the runs in this area to be lapped without needing to return to Excelerator.

In 2014, new 8 person cabins were bought to upgrade the Whistler Village Gondola, the existing cabins having been in service since 1988. Sigma, a subsidiary of Leitner-Poma who originally installed the lift, were contracted to produce the new cabins.

In May 2015, Whistler Blackcomb announced that both mountains would be declared smoke-free environments, President and CEO Dave Brownlie was quoted as saying "We have made the decision...to preserve the pristine alpine environment our guests come here for,". He continued to highlight a need for a safer workplace for employees and experience for guests, "We also recognize as a leader in the outdoor adventure and wellness industry and as the largest employer in the Whistler community, we have a responsibility to our guests and staff to provide a safe and healthy environment for work and play. We believe implementing this new policy aligns with this goal."

In April 2016, a $345-million three-phase development plan, named 'Renaissance,' was announced by the mountain, described as the "largest and most exciting investment in the Company's history." On-mountain improvements to skiing and snowboard activities included a replacement of the Magic Chair with a new high-speed lift and the addition of night skiing in the same area during phase one. Additionally, during phase two and three, the Franz, Catskinner, and Olympic chairs would be replaced with new high speed lifts, a new gondola would be constructed from Creekside Base on Whistler Mountain, two new chairlifts would be added in Bagel and Khyber Bowls, and two new high speed lifts would replace Wizard and Solar Coaster. The Renaissance developments reflect many of the proposals included in the resort master plan updated at the end of 2013.

Additional projects part of Renaissance include a 163,000-square-foot water park with water slides, a mountain roller coaster, a suspension bridge atop Whistler Mountain's peak, expansion of Whistler Mountain Bike Park, new parking facilities and housing developments, a new 'Blackcomb Grind' hiking trail, and a revitalization of Blackcomb's base. The start of this project will be subject to government approval and the renegotiation of the company's master development agreements and negotiation of a proposed business partnership with local First Nations. Once approval is granted, Phase One projects and expansions will take two years to construct.

On August 8, 2016, it was announced that Whistler Blackcomb Holdings, which owned 75% of the Whistler and Blackcomb partnerships, would be sold to Vail Resorts of Colorado for C$1.4 billion, which also saw the addition of the resort to the Epic Pass.

For 2018, Doppelmayr carried out two major lift projects. On Blackcomb, the aging Wizard and Solar Coaster high speed quads were replaced with a two-stage ten passenger gondola, with a midway turn station near where the previous lifts met. Like the Whistler Village and Excalibur Gondolas, the two segments can be operated as one continuous lift or as two separate lifts. On Whistler, the Emerald Express was replaced with a high speed six pack, and similar to Harmony five years earlier, the original lift was relocated to Blackcomb to replace Catskinner. The Catskinner Express runs on a modified alignment compared to its predecessor, starting below the Magic Castle whereas the triple started at the base of the Nintendo Terrain Park.

=== 2020s ===
Due to the COVID-19 pandemic, Whistler was forced to close for the remainder of the ski season. Vail gave refunds to anyone who booked a trip during the closing time. However, the 2020–21 season was in operation. To comply with provincial safety protocols, masks and social distancing were mandated in crowded spaces to reduce transmission of the disease. Except for a brief closure in March 2021, operations remained like this for the rest of the season. The 2021–22 season saw similar rules in the resort.

In 2020, the Horstman T-bar was closed down and dismantled as the glacier it was built on receded. However, glacier skiing is still an activity during the summer, only in the upper regions with the Showcase T-bar.

For the 2022–23 winter season, as part of Vail's Epic Lift Upgrade project, Doppelmayr replaced the Creekside Gondola and the Big Red Express, upgrading them to a ten-passenger gondola and a high speed six pack chair respectively. The new Creekside Gondola increased its lift capacity by 35% and the new Big Red 6 increased its lift capacity by 30%. In May 2022, the old cabins and chairs of the two lifts were put on sale and were sold for charity. Since the Creekside Gondola is also a mountain biking lift in the summer, during construction, bikers were allowed to bring their bikes in the Whistler Village Gondola cabins and the Garbanzo Express opened earlier. However, due to shipping delays, the Creekside Gondola and Big Red 6 were only completed in December 2022. From the start of the 2022–23 winter season before the opening of the two new lifts, shuttle buses transported guests from the Creekside area to the main village.

The 2023–24 and 2024–25 seasons saw the resort install two high speed chairlifts from Doppelmayr that had originally been manufactured for Park City Mountain Resort, both of which replaced older high speed quads. 2023 saw the replacement of Fitzsimmons with a high speed eight pack, while 2024 saw the replacement of Jersey Cream with a high speed six pack.

On December 10, 2025, Vail Resorts announced that Blackcomb's Showcase T-bar will be replaced by a fixed-grip quad chairlift for the 2026–27 season. The new chairlift, named the Showcase Quad, will open on December 19, 2026.

== Major events ==
- 2010 Winter Olympics
- FIS Freestyle World Ski Championships 2001
- FIS Snowboarding World Championships 2005
- FIS Alpine Ski World Cup – 1975, 1982, 1984, 1986, 1989, 1993, 1994, 1995, 2008
- FIS Freestyle Skiing World Cup – 1982, 1991, 1992, 1993, 1994, 1995, 1996, 1997, 1998, 1999, 2000, 2001, 2002
- 2025 Invictus Games

=== Terrain aspects ===
- North: 55%
- West: 40%
- East: 2%
- South: 3%

== Other facilities ==
=== Whistler Mountain Bike Park ===
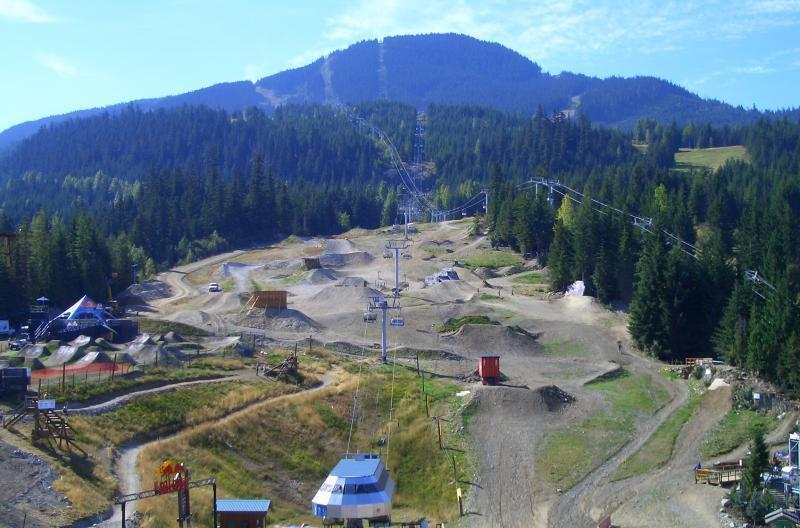
Aerial View of the Whistler Bike Park

The Whistler Mountain Bike Park celebrated its 10th anniversary in 2008. Having consistently grown since its inception, it sees an average of 100,000 bikers each summer.

The Whistler Mountain Bike Park uses the Fitzsimmons 8 and Garbanzo quad lifts, as well as the Whistler Village Gondola and Creekside Gondola to shuttle bikers to around midstation, at 1,200 m (3,900 ft). The park has 47+ trails for all skill levels totaling 250 km + of trails. There are smooth trails with gentle banked corners for beginners, steep twisty trails for intermediates, tight trails with jumps and stunts for advanced riders, and challenging trails with giant jumps, drops, and root-strewn terrain for the experts.

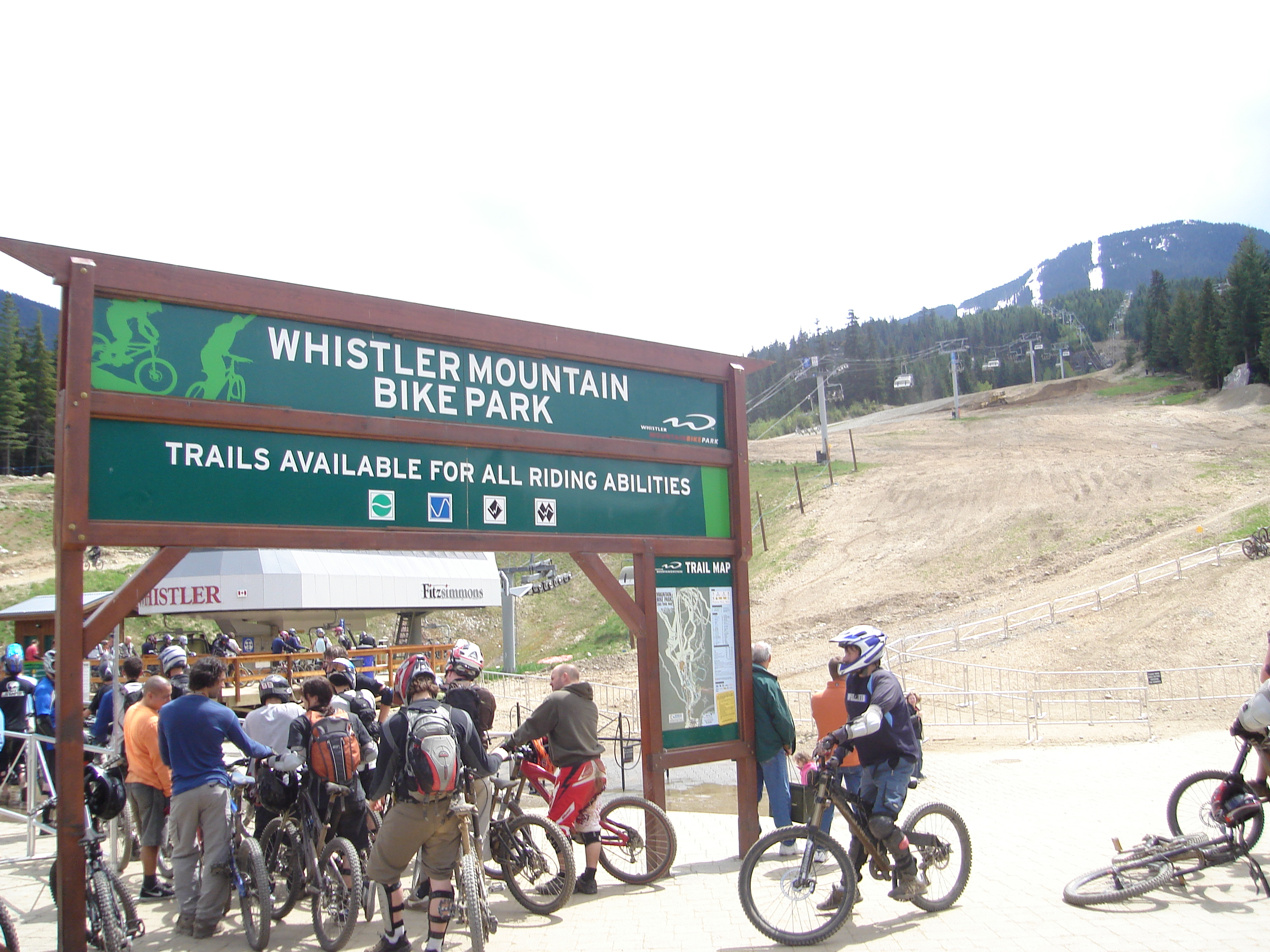
Riders waiting in the Fitzsimmons chairlift line

During the summer, Fitzsimmons 8 and Garbanzo are used for bike hauls, with select chairs having their seats replaced with a bike rack. These racks fit four bikes, three in grooves and one on a hook on the side of the chair. The bikers then get on the next chair which is a normal passenger carrier. The Fitzsimmons chair, the most popular on the mountain, used this system until 2023. The updated Fitz chair opening December 12, 2023 updated the capacity from 2 per chair to five. The updated chair features many seats, and 4 front tire slots on the back, as well as a hook on the side for a fifth bike.

The bike park has three zones: the Fitzsimmons Zone (the lower zone), the Garbanzo Zone (the upper zone) and the Creekside Zone. All riders take either the Village Gondola or Fitzsimmons 8 to the Olympic Station area. Then intermediate and advanced riders can take Garbanzo up further to the Garbanzo zone. Garbanzo riders can then return to midstation or Whistler Village, the base of the bike park. The Creekside Zone can be accessed via the Creekside Gondola or by riding through the Garbanzo Zone. From the top of Garbanzo to the village is an 1,100 m (3,600 ft) vertical descent; eclipsed only by the descent from the top gondola station or the top of the Peak Chair, the highest accessible point on the mountain. "A-Line" is the most well-known track. The Boneyard Slopestyle Course is part of the Fitzsimmons Zone and is located at the very bottom of the bike park, visible from the base of Whistler Mountain. The Boneyard features a collection of high-intermediate and advanced slopestyle features, including drops, dirt jumps, and more.

Each summer since 2004, the park hosts Crankworx, the largest annual freeride mountain biking competition in North America. Another major competition, Harvest Huckfest, was held there each fall from 2002 to 2008.

=== Whistler Blackcomb's Tube Park ===
For the 2005–06 ski season, Blackcomb Mountain opened the Tube Park to allow for recreational tubing at the resort. The tube park is located at Base II alongside the Village Run.

== Incidents ==
=== Quicksilver Express grip failure, December 23, 1995 ===
The lift operator on the Quicksilver lift pressed the button to make a routine stop, to allow a fallen skier to get out of the way of the unloading ramp. Instead, the emergency brake activated, sending shockwaves down the cable. Grips on at least two of the chairs slipped, and caused chairs to slide down the cable and slam into each other. In all, eight were injured, and two were killed, in one of the worst ski lift accidents in North America. The lift's manufacturer, Lift Engineering/Yan, entered bankruptcy after the incident in July 1996. The cause was found to be a design fault in the Yan detachable grip. The Quicksilver lift was removed and replaced by the first Creekside Gondola. The other two Yan high-speed quads on Whistler, Greenline and Redline, were replaced with Doppelmayr high-speed quads the year after that, with all-new terminals, grips and chairs, and renamed as the Emerald Express and Big Red Express respectively.

=== Excalibur Gondola collapse, December 16, 2008 ===
The Excalibur gondola had a major malfunction on December 16, 2008, when the upper portion of one of the lift towers detached and collapsed, causing several of the gondola cabins to drop near to the ground, leaving 53 people trapped on the lower section of the lift line. Firefighters rescued passengers from a cabin dangling over Fitzsimmons Creek, and from another gondola that landed on a bus shelter. The third cabin had crashed into the trees, narrowly missing a condominium. Twelve people suffered minor injuries.

=== Whistler T-Bars summer maintenance incident, August 31, 2009 ===
On August 31, 2009, two lift maintenance employees were injured when the lift began to move, after being given the go-ahead while a maintenance person was safety-harnessed to the tower. The person remained attached to both the tower and the maintenance carrier while the second employee was secured to the carrier. The safety harness ended up pulling so hard on the maintenance carrier that the carrier became detached from the cable and dropped to the rocky ground below, severely injuring the worker in it. The employee hanging from the tower only received bruises.

== Photographs ==
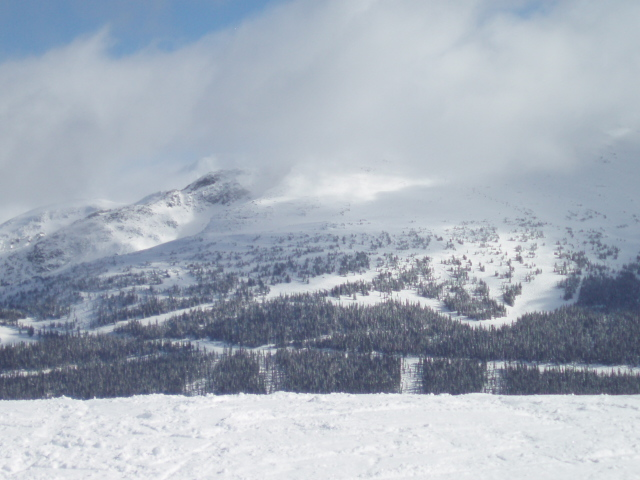
A view of 7th Heaven on Blackcomb Mountain from Whistler Mountain.

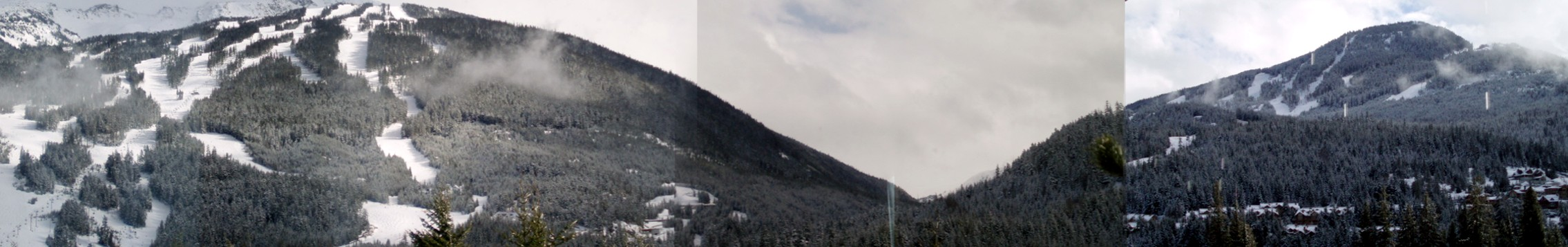
Panorama of the two mountains

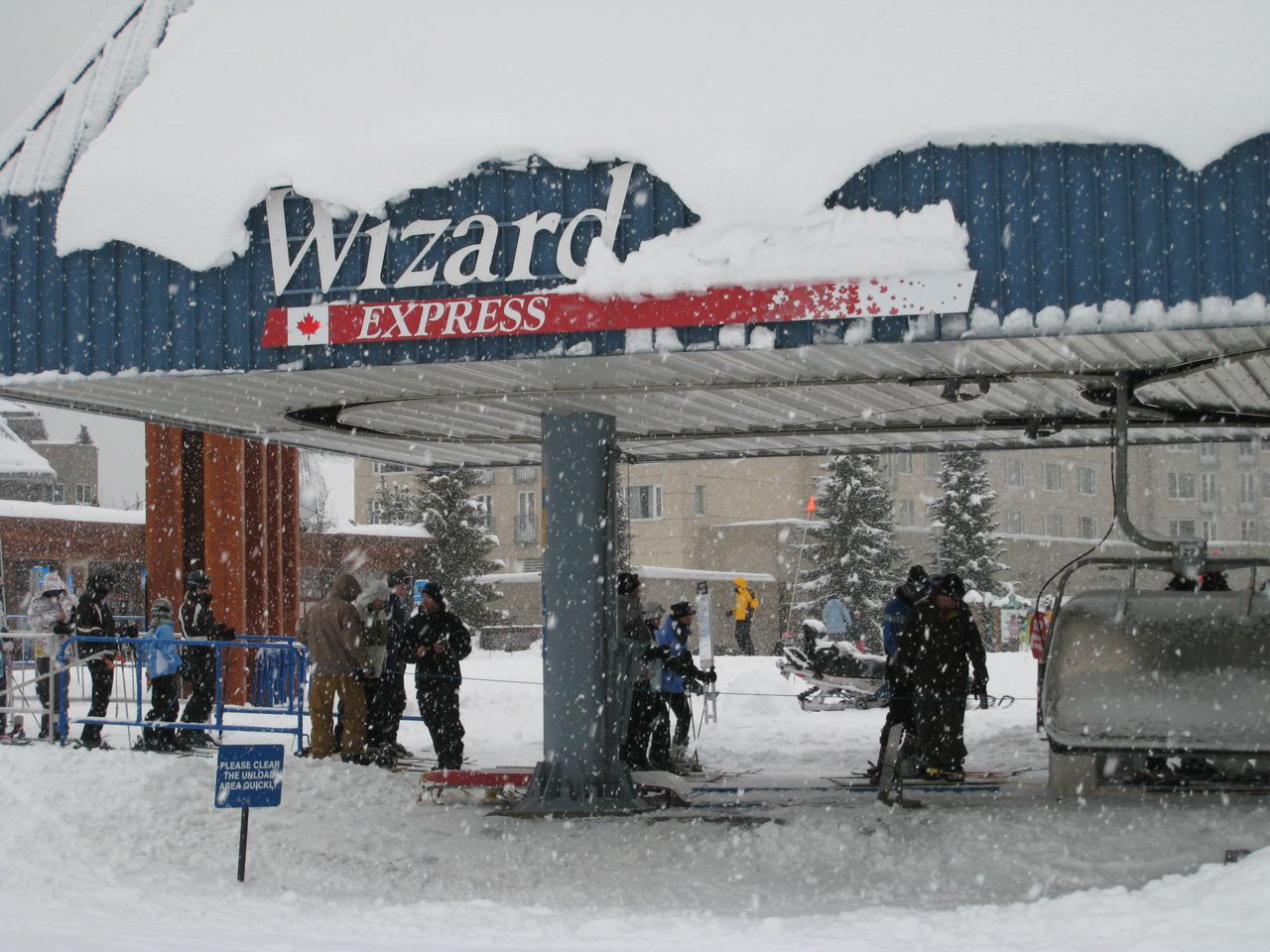
The Wizard Express quad lift at the base of Blackcomb mountain (since removed)

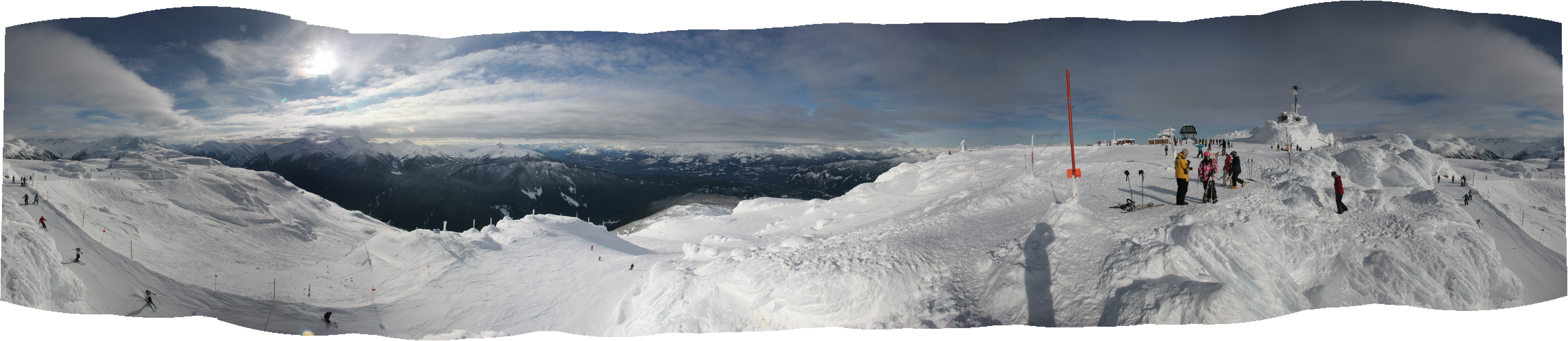
360 degree panorama from the top of Whistler Peak

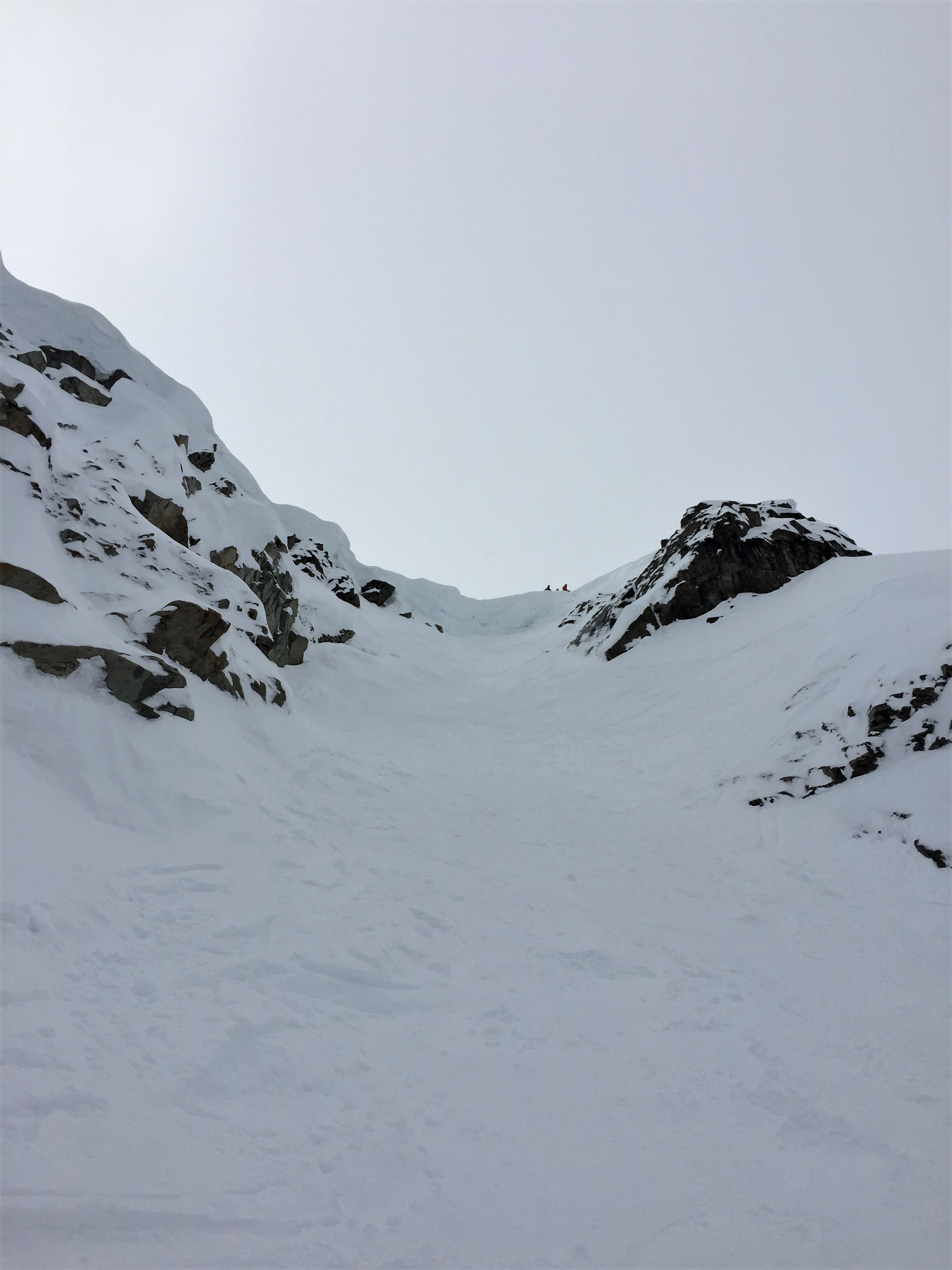
The Couloir Run on Whistler Mountain

== See also ==
- Garibaldi Provincial Park
- Jack Souther
- Little Australia
- Windows Vista
- Windows XP
