= Blackcomb Peak =

Mountain in British Columbia, Canada

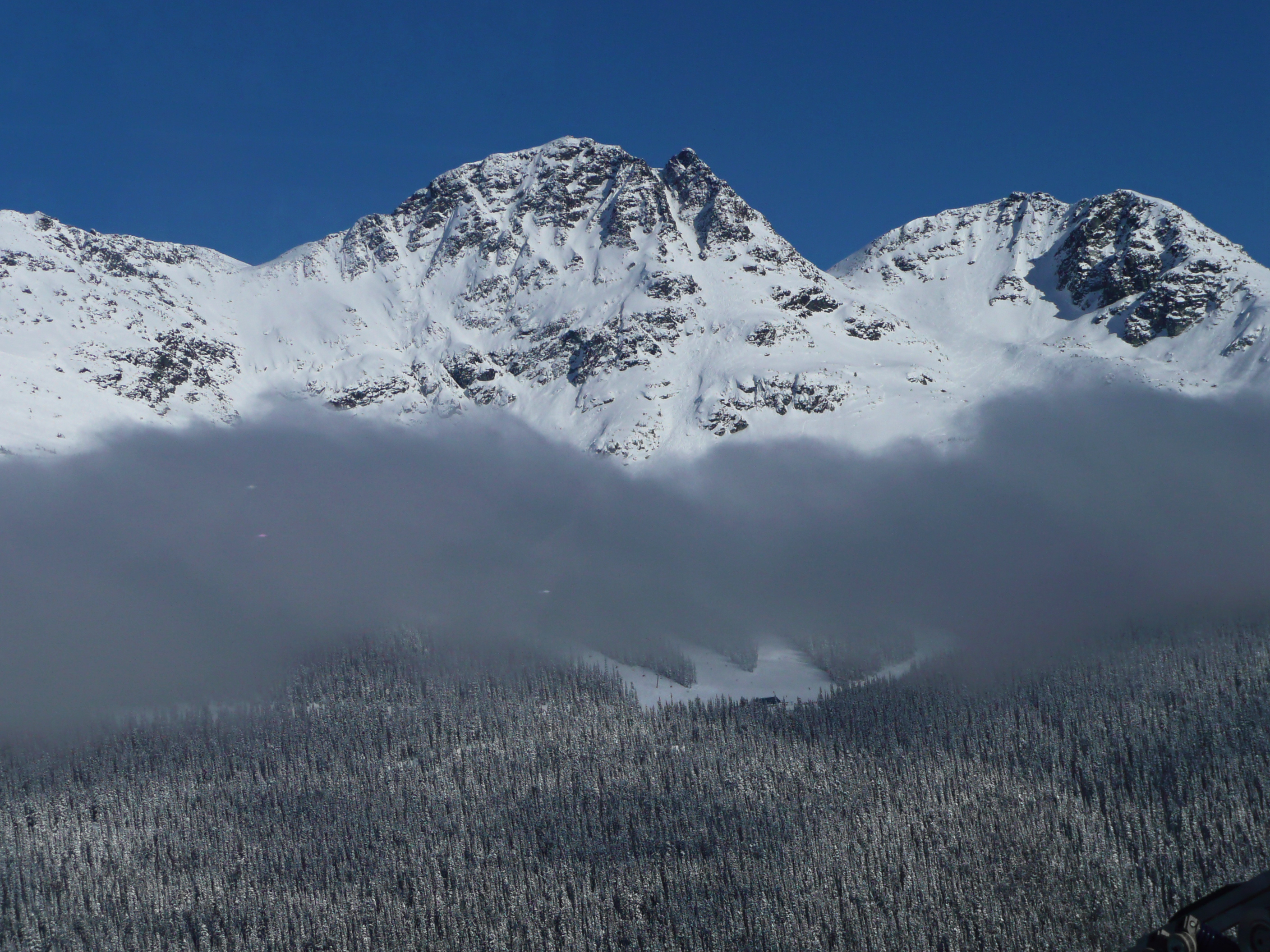

Highest point
- Elevation: 2,436 m (7,992 ft)
- Prominence: 86 m (282 ft)
- Coordinates: 50°04′53″N 122°52′15″W

Geography
- Location within British Columbia Location within Canada
- Interactive map of Blackcomb Peak
- Location: British Columbia, Canada
- District: New Westminster Land District
- Parent range: Fitzsimmons Range
- Topo map: NTC 92J2 Whistler

Climbing
- First ascent: 1923 by Phyllis Munday and Don Munday
- Easiest route: class 3

Blackcomb Peak (Ucwalmícwts: Tsíqten) is a mountain located east of Whistler, British Columbia that forms the boundary between the Whistler Blackcomb ski resort and Garibaldi Provincial Park. Like Whistler Mountain, it is located on the edge of Garibaldi Provincial Park and the ski lifts are often used to access the park, particularly for the Spearhead Traverse.

Several ski runs are established on the mountain, with Whistler Village at the base of the mountain on the side facing Whistler Mountain, and Blackcomb Village below the opposite face. The 2010 Winter Olympics sliding sports including Bobsleigh, Luge and Skeleton took place on its slopes, at the Whistler Sliding Centre located on it.

== Climate ==
Based on the Köppen climate classification, Blackcomb Peak is located in the marine west coast climate zone of western North America. Most weather fronts originate in the Pacific Ocean, and travel east toward the Coast Mountains where they are forced upward by the range (Orographic lift), causing them to drop their moisture in the form of rain or snowfall. As a result, the Coast Mountains experience high precipitation, especially during the winter months in the form of snowfall. Temperatures can drop below −20 °C with wind chill factors below −30 °C. The months July through September offer the most favorable weather for climbing Blackcomb Peak.

== Gallery ==
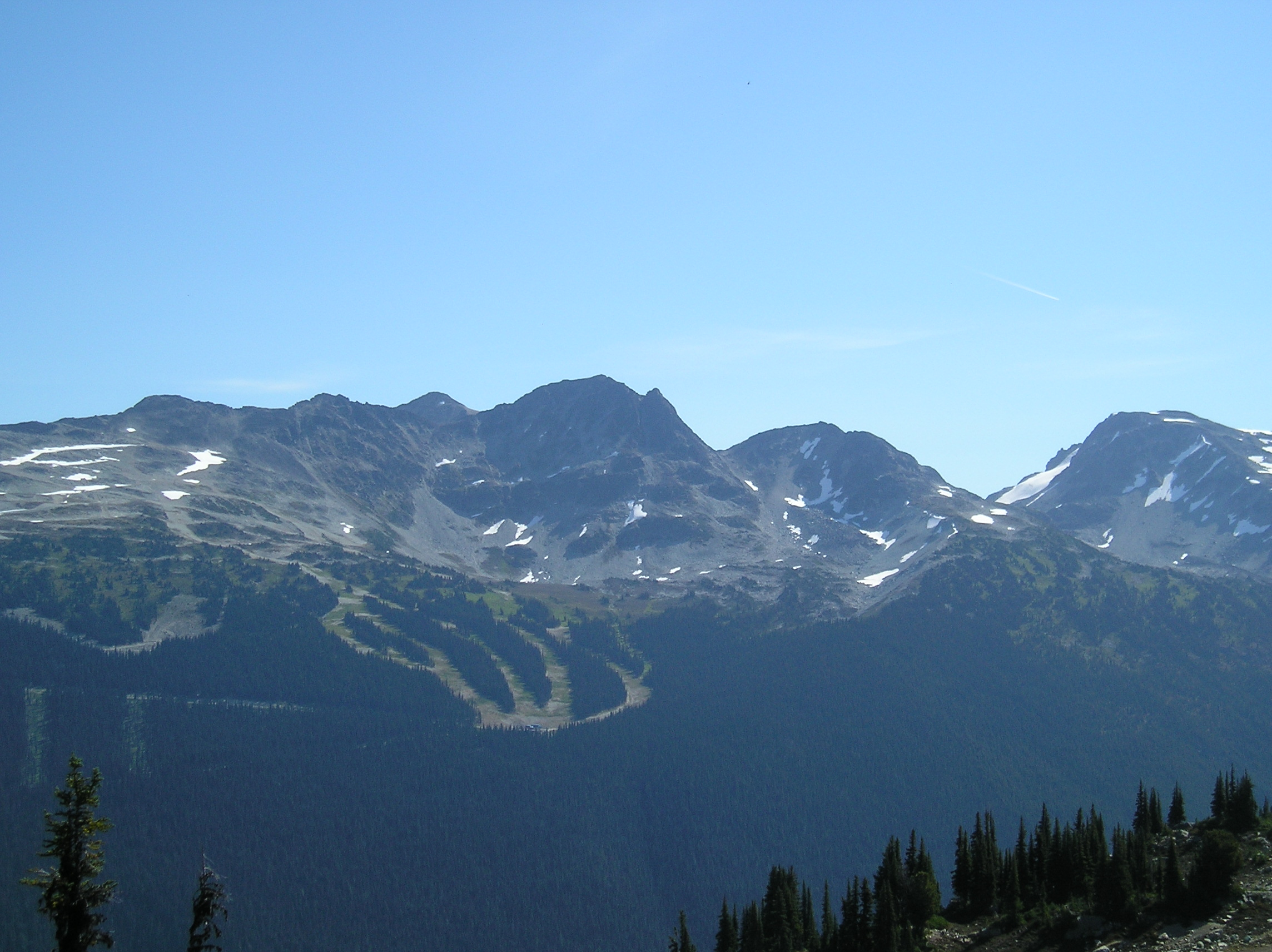
Blackcomb, with the 7th Heaven ski run, after the ski season

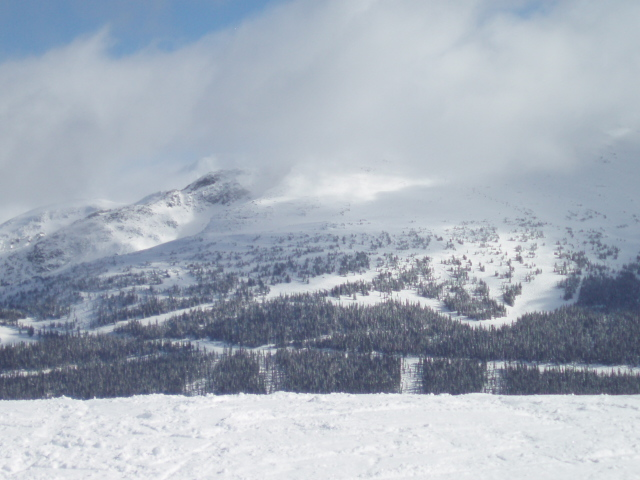
Blackcomb in 2007, ski run featured

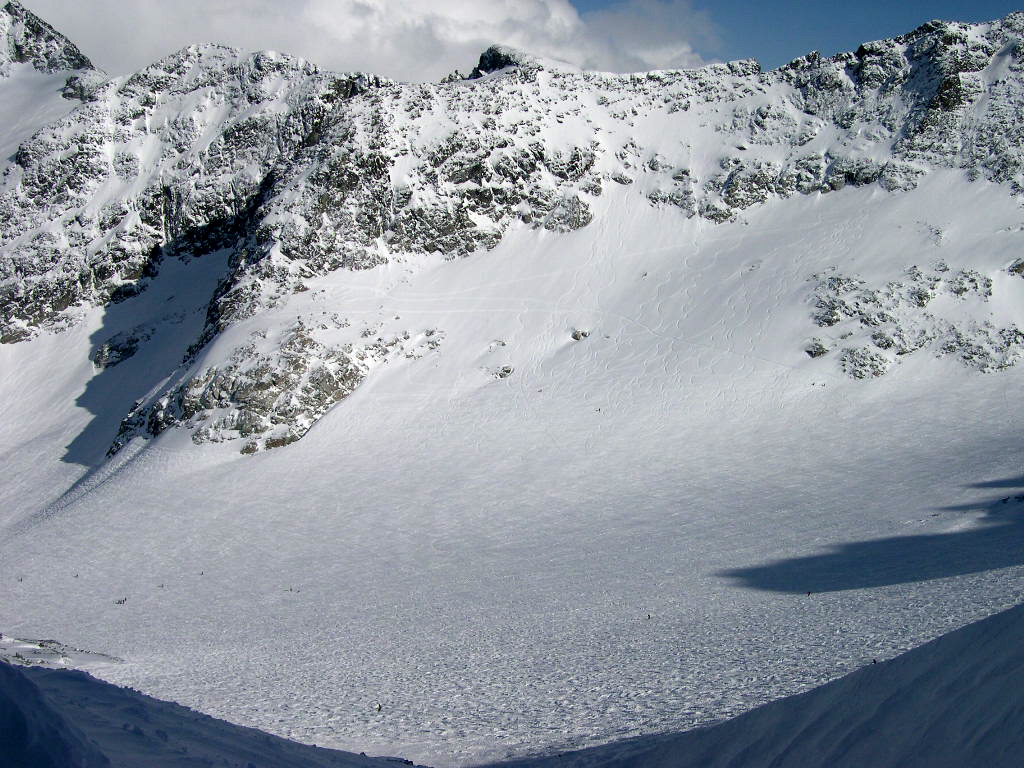
View of Blackcomb Glacier from the "Blowhole" entrance to Blackcomb Glacier Provincial Park. Spearhead Mtn in foreground, Phalanx Mtn on left

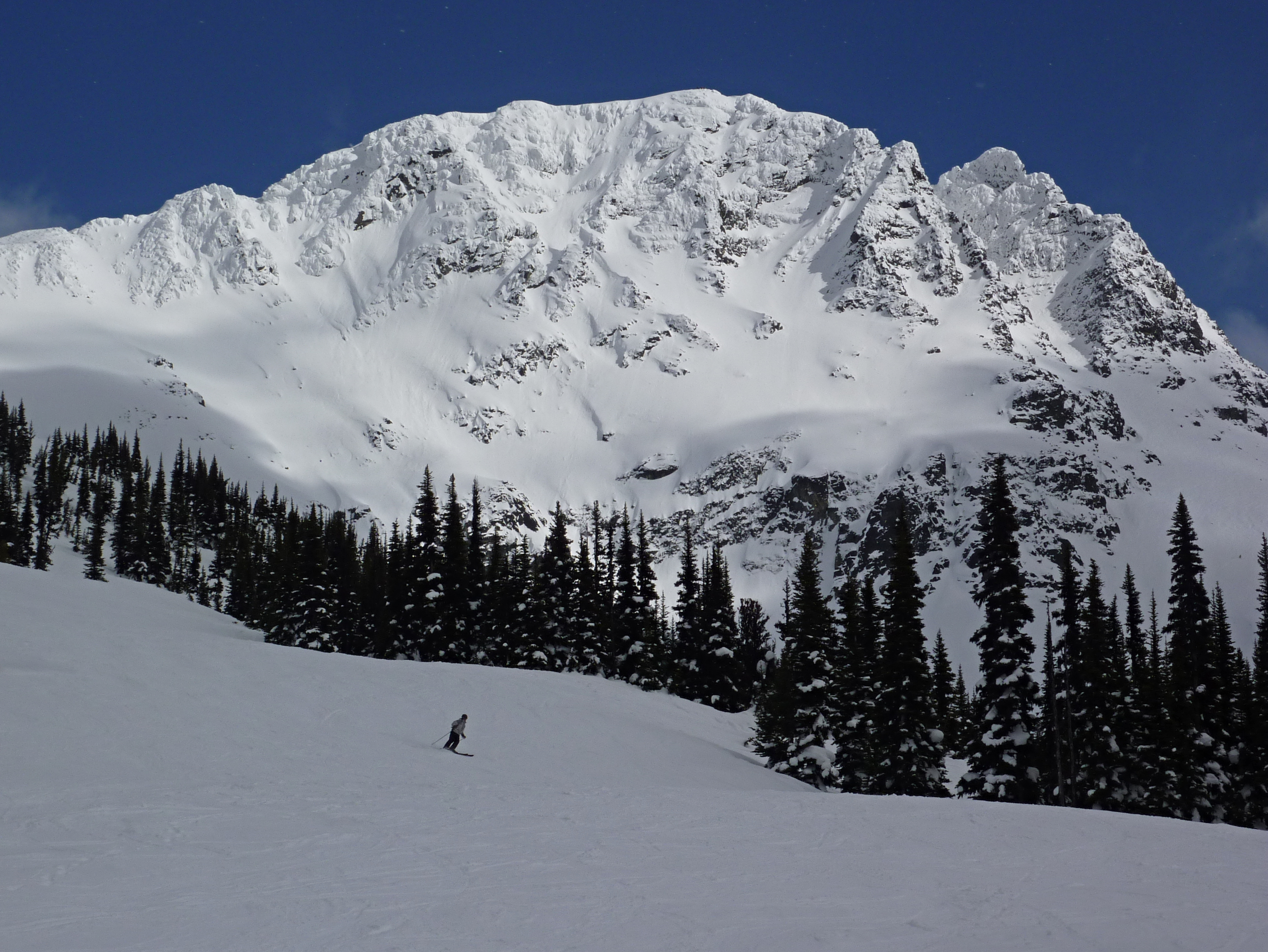
Blackcomb Peak

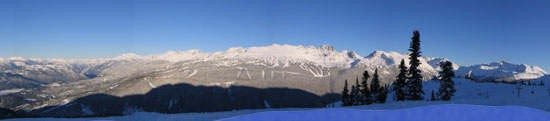
Blackcomb Mountain, as seen looking north from Whistler Mountain. The trails served by Seventh Heaven are seen face-on just right of mid-frame, the upper half of these trails are not obvious in the large "bowl" along the top of the peak. The majority of Blackcomb's trails run down the slope to the left, and are not easily visible in this picture.

== See also ==
- List of mountains of Canada
- Geography of British Columbia
- Geology of British Columbia
