= Bullwheel =

Wheel on which a rope turns

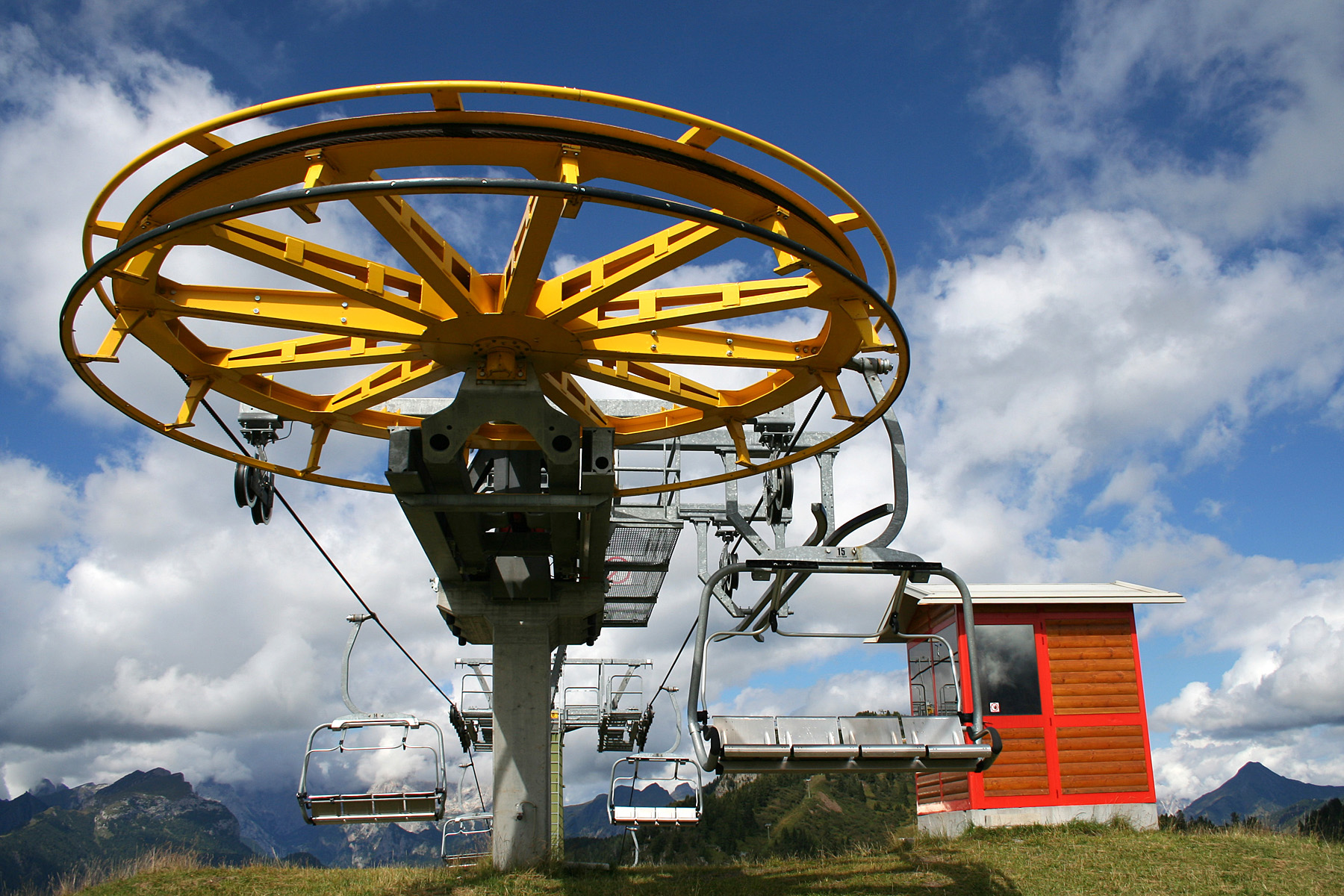
A chairlift's return bullwheel

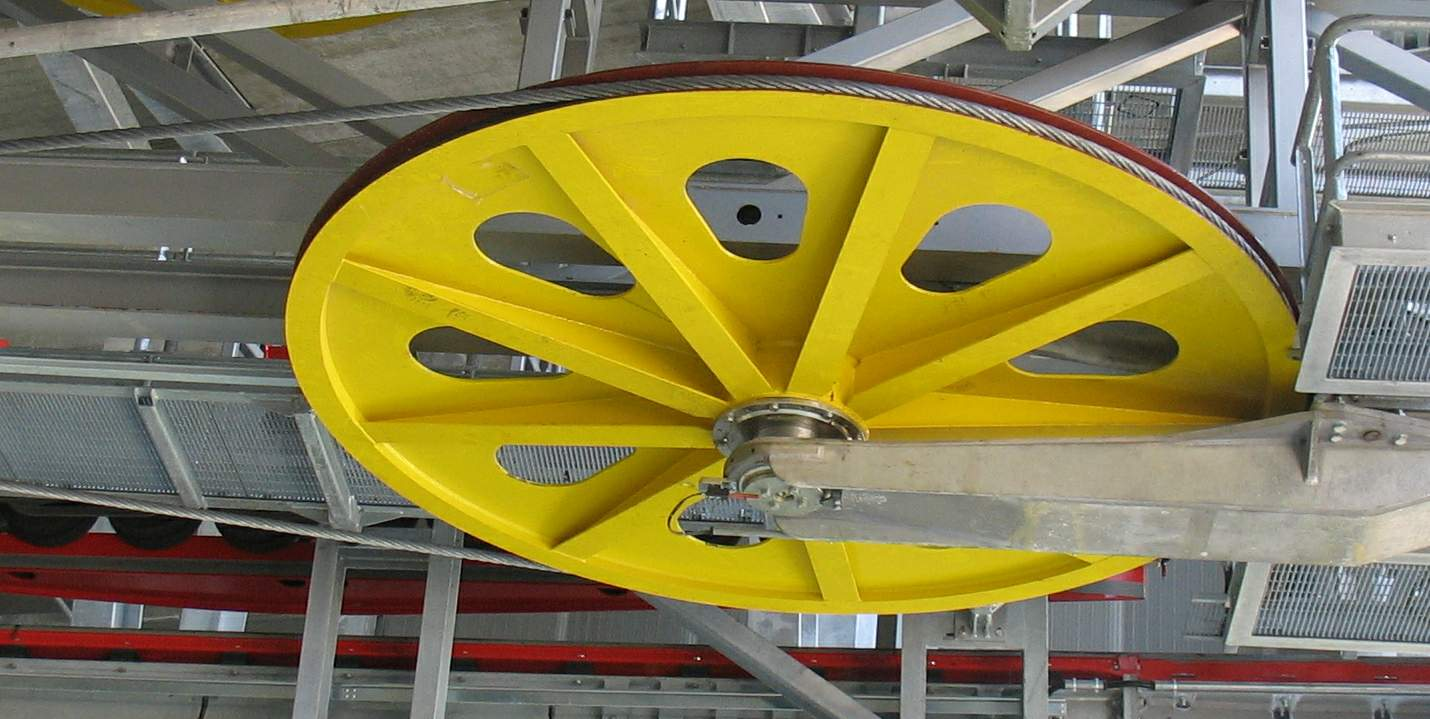
A bullwheel of a tricable gondola lift

A bullwheel or bull wheel is a large wheel on which a rope turns, such as in a chairlift or other ropeway. In this application, the bullwheel that is attached to the prime mover is called the drive bullwheel, and the other is the return bullwheel. One of the bullwheels is usually attached to a cable tensioning system, which is usually either hydraulic or fixed counterweights.

A double-grooved bullwheel may be used by some ropeways, whereby two cables travelling at the same speed, or the same cable twice, loop around the bullwheel.

The bullwheel began use in farm implements with the reaper. The term described the traveling wheel, traction wheel, drive wheel, or harvester wheel. The bullwheel powered all the moving parts of these farm machines including the reciprocating knives, reel, rake, and self binder. The bullwheel's outer surface provided traction against the ground and turned when the draft animals or tractor pulled the implement forward. Cyrus McCormick used the bullwheel to power his 1834 reaper and until the early 1920s when small internal combustion engine gasoline engines like the Cushman Motor began to be favored.
