= Ak-Bulak (ski resort) =

Ski resort in Kazakhstan

Ak-Bulak ski resort
- Interactive map of Ak-Bulak ski resort
- Location: Talgar, Almaty region, Kazakhstan
- Coordinates: 43.27028°N 77.36417°E
- Top elevation: 2,664 m (8,740 ft)
- Base elevation: 1,652 m (5,420 ft)
- Total length: 14 km (8.7 mi)
- Website: https://ak-bulak.kz/

Ak-Bulak ski resort (Russian: Ак-Булак, tr. ak bulak) is located 40 km to the east of Almaty in the foothills of the Trans-Ili Alatau at an altitude of 1600 meters above sea level, behind Talgar. It is an accredited training base for athletes.

== Characteristics ==
The climate is temperate. The average summer temperature is between 15 and 25 Celsius degrees above zero, while in winter it ranges from -2 to -15 degrees below zero.

There are 6 trails of varying difficulty levels, from beginners to freeride enthusiasts. The total length of the slopes is 14 km. The maximum steepness of the slope is 55 degrees. There are 5 cableways: 2 chairlifts, 1 gondola elevator, 1 rope tow elevator and 1 children's elevator. Manufacturers of ski elevators: Doppelmayr (Austria) and Leitner (Italy). The largest elevator length reaches 2351 m. In case of lack of snow on the slopes there is a possibility to use artificial snowing appliance.

== Incidents ==
On February 17, 2022, a skier was struck by an avalanche at the resort. Measures to prevent avalanches were in progress at the time. The skier had crossed the border, which he was not allowed to surpass for safety reasons. After surpassing the border, the skier was caught in an avalanche, but safety specialists reacted immediately and rescued the man within 15 minutes. The skier was not injured.
