= Aerobus =

Cable suspension monorail

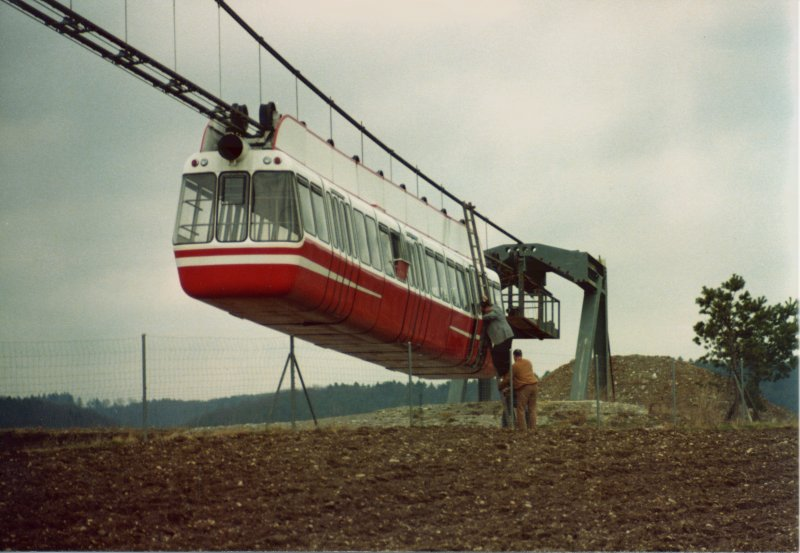
Aerobus test track in Dietlikon, Switzerland in 1974

Aerobus is a self-propelled electrically powered bus-like vehicle riding on a suspended overhead cable. The cable arrangement, similar to a suspension bridge, allows for long spans of up to 600 metres between pylons. The Aerobus system was invented in the late 1960s by Gerhard Mueller of the GMD Mueller aerial lift company in Switzerland. The patents to Aerobus are currently owned by Aerobus International Ltd. of Houston, Texas, United States.

== Installations ==
- 1970 – First test track in Schmerikon (Switzerland)
- 1975 – Test track sold and moved to Mont-Sainte-Anne (Canada) where it stayed in operation until 1992.
- 1974 New test track in Dietlikon (Switzerland).
- 1975 Temporary installation in Mannheim (Germany) with 8 cars and 2.2 million people transported in six months.
- 1992 (not installed) - awarded Phase I planning study funding for Milwaukee County, (Wisconsin) Regional Medical Center.
- 2000 (not installed)– Chinese city of Chongqing awards a contract to Aerobus for a 2.6 km system with three stations that crosses the Yangtze and Jialing rivers in the downtown area, with pylons up to 300 ft high. This was project was apparently cancelled, as the rapidly growing city installed bigger, more costly transit modes instead.
- 2007 (not installed)– Final approval for construction of a 4.2 km-long installation carried by eight pylons in Weihai (China). The system would connect Liugong Island with the mainland city of Weihei, with a large observation-tower station in the center. According to a company spokesman in early 2009 construction was underway on the $100 million Weihai line, with completion originally scheduled for 2011. However the project seems to have been cancelled or stalled as there are no further reports of any progress.
- 2013 (proposal)- Reports indicate that as of August 2013 the company is seeking to sell the system in Quito, Ecuador
- Proposed Malacca Aerorail is supposed to use Aerobus technology
- Proposed Phnom Penh Skytrain is prefer to use Aerobus technology than AGT
