= GMD Müller =

GMD Müller Lifts AG
- Industry: Cable transport
- Founded: 1947; 79 years ago in Dietlikon, Switzerland
- Founder: Gerhard Müller
- Defunct: 1985; 41 years ago
- Successor: Rowema

GMD Müller Lifts AG, known as GMD Müller, was a ropeway manufacturing company based in Dietlikon, Switzerland. GMD stands for Gerhard Müller Dietlikon.

Founded in 1947 by engineer Gerhard Müller, who is credited with the invention of the modern detachable chairlift in the late 1940s, it was one of the most prolific and respected aerial lift manufacturers in skiing history. The company was bought out by the management in 1985 after Müller's death and went out of business in 1992.

== Overview ==
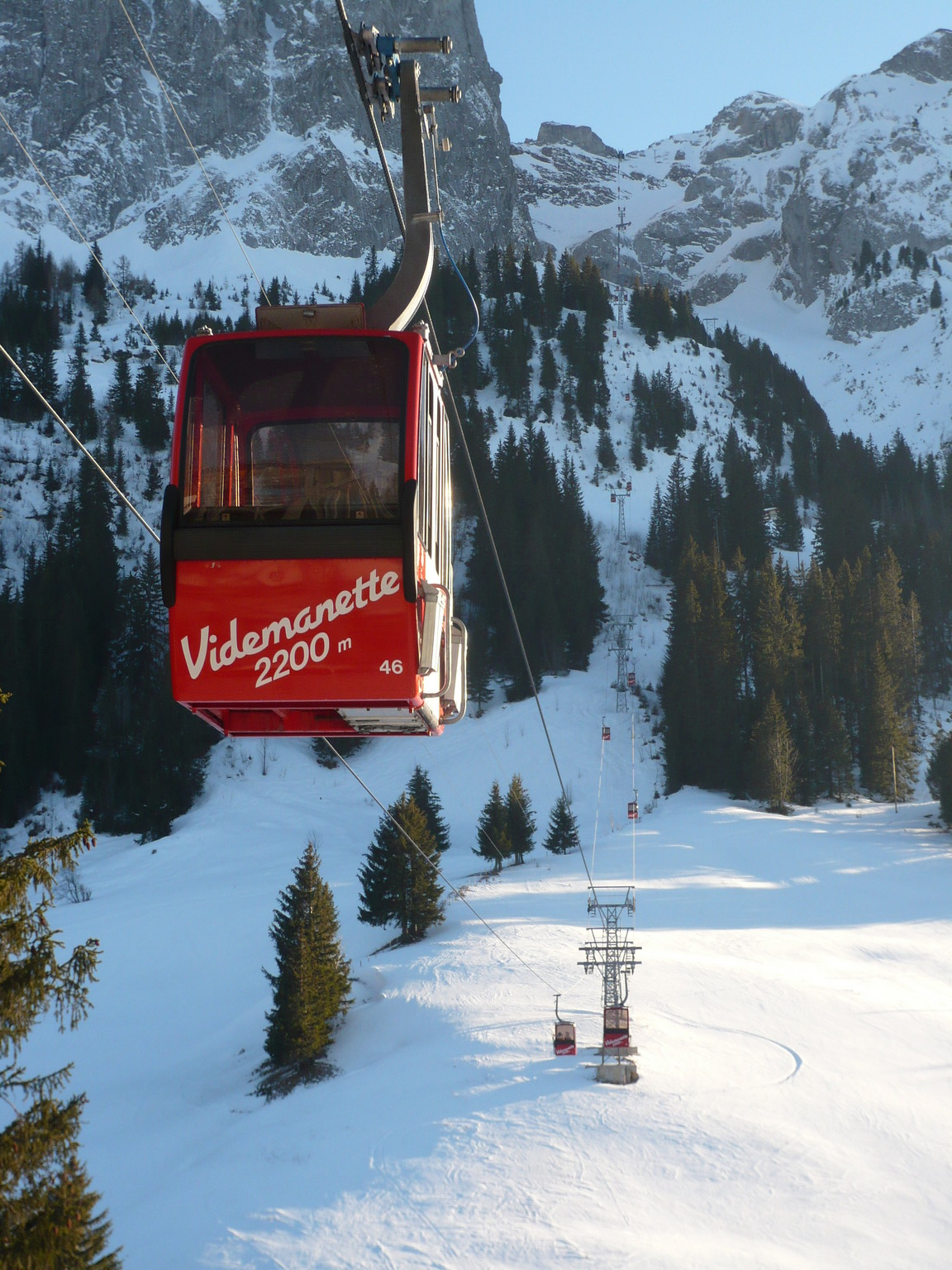
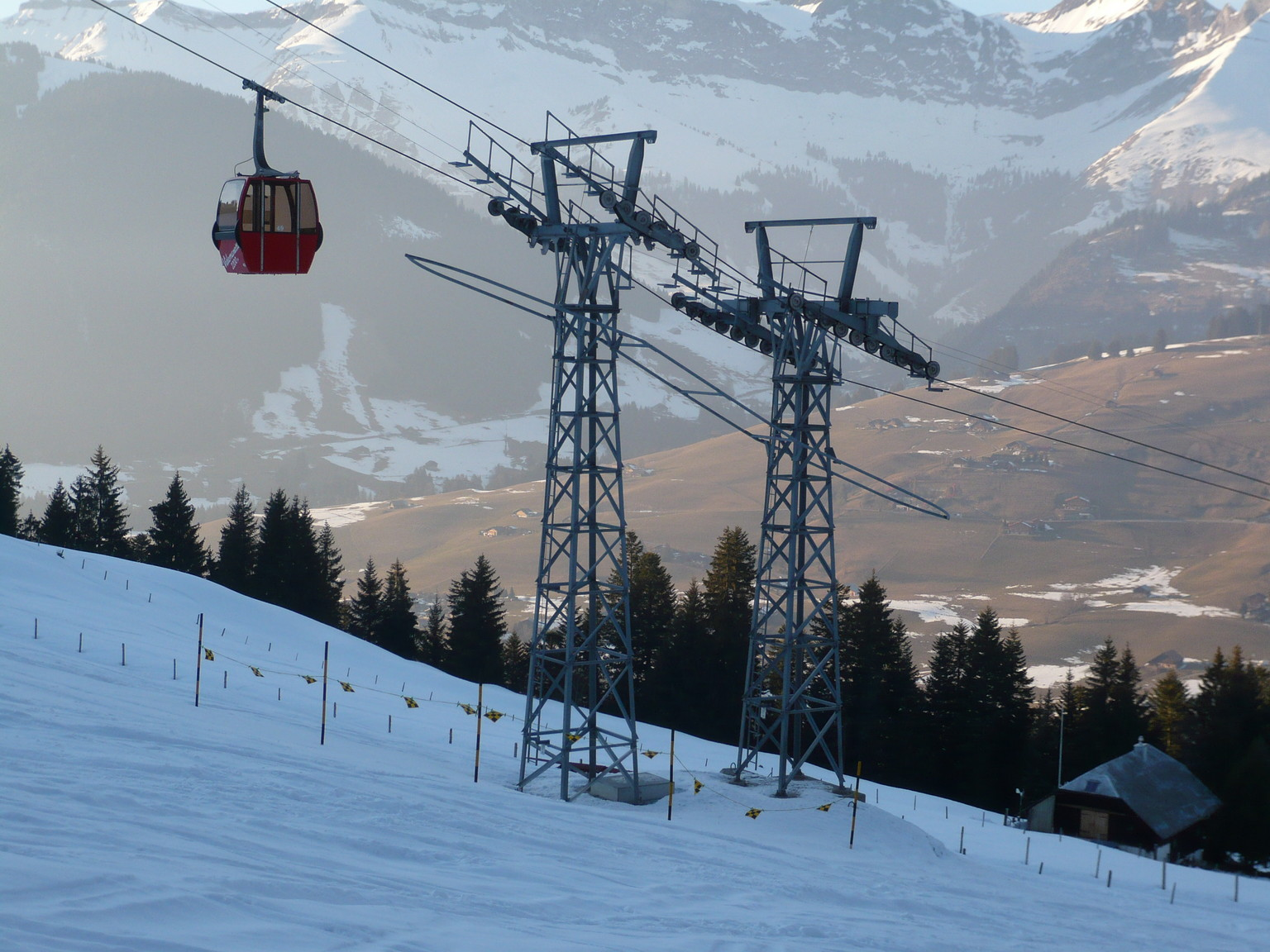
A gondola lift constructed by GMD Müller in 1984, in Rougemont, Switzerland. This gondola lift was dismantled in 2010

In the late 1920s, Gerhard Müller, a mechanical engineering student, was a newcomer to growing sport of skiing. At the time, there were no user-friendly ski lifts in Switzerland.

At a resort hotel outside Zürich, Müller created his first usable ski lift consisting of a 1-inch hemp rope and some old motorcycle parts. Naturally, being a rope tow, guests regularly complained about sore hands and torn clothes resulting from using the lift. The Sami people use reindeer to tow themselves around on skis, but they rest their hands by looping the reins around their hips. Inspired by this practice, Müller solved the problems of his rope tow by creating the first modern T-bar lift.

GMD Müller gave the licence for T-bar lift to polish company Mostostal Zabrze in 1959. Some of this lifts are still exists.

During the 1960s and 1970s GMD Müller installed more than one hundred fixed-grip chairlifts in North America. Many of these lifts are still in service today. In Europe 4-seater gondola lifts with Müller's patented detachable cable grips and T-bars were more popular. Some resorts, such as Whistler, were at the time exclusively equipped with Müller lifts.

GMD Müller is also noted for inventing the Aerobus, a self-propelled bus-like vehicle riding on a suspended overhead cable.

Rowema AG legally succeeded GMD Müller Lifts AG in 1985, and continues to service and supply spare parts to existing GMD Müller systems.

== See also ==
- List of aerial lift manufacturers
