= Arizona Snowbowl =

Ski area in Coconino County, Arizona

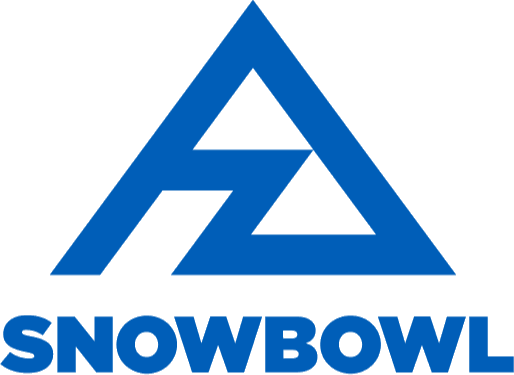

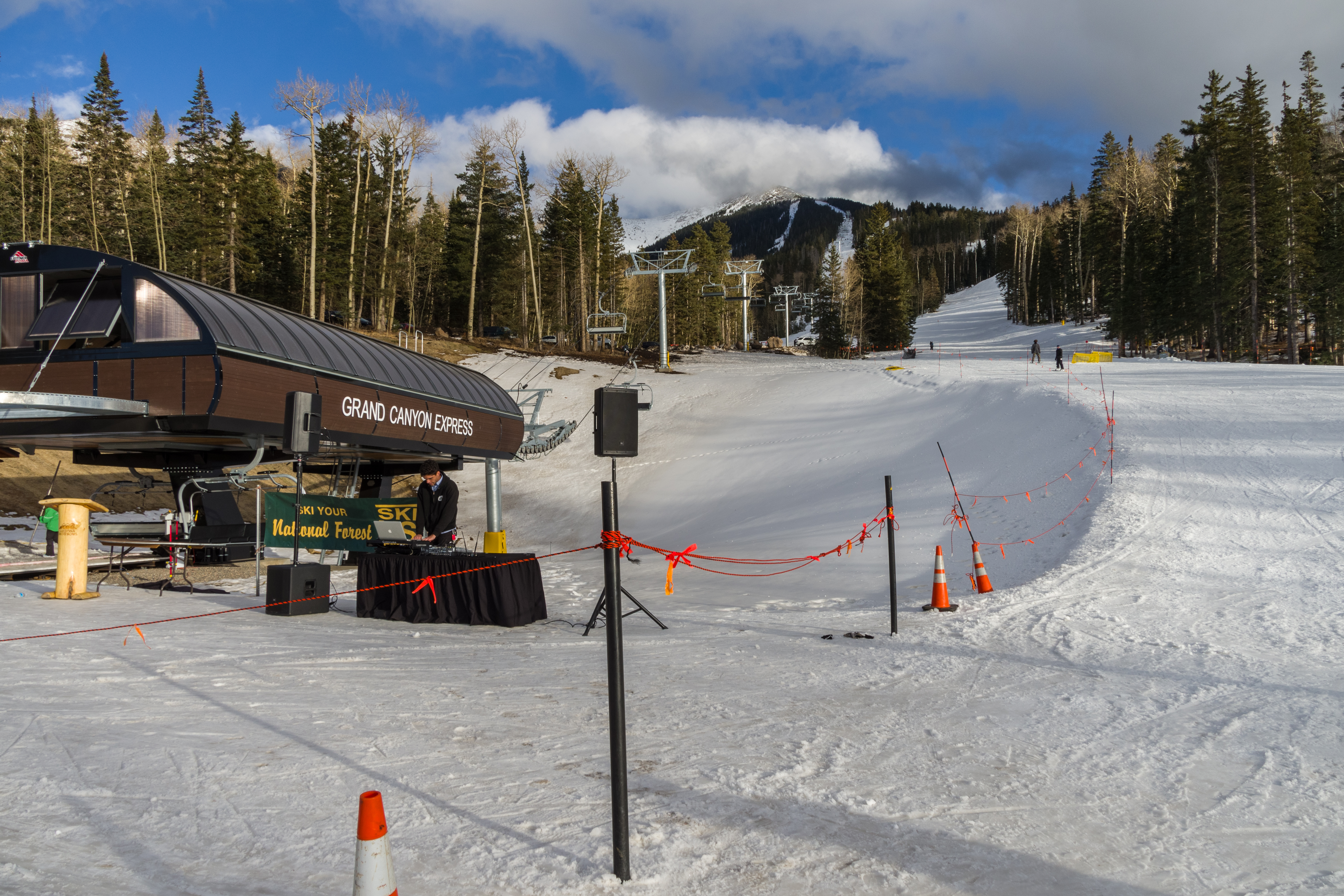
- Arizona Snowbowl in 2016

- Location in Arizona Arizona Snowbowl (the United States)
- Location: Coconino County, Arizona, United States
- Nearest major city: Flagstaff – 15 miles (24 km)
- Coordinates: 35.330°N 111.705°W
- Vertical: 2,300 ft (700 m)
- Top elevation: 11,500 ft (3,505 m)
- Base elevation: 9,200 ft (2,805 m)
- Skiable area: 777 acres (3.14 km^{2})
- Trails: 55 (Including hike-to terrain) – 37% easiest – 42% more difficult – 21% most difficult
- Longest run: 2.0 mi (3.2 km)
- Lift system: 8 total – 6 chairs (1 combination lift (gondola + six-pack), 1 high-speed six-pack, 2 quads, 1 triple, 1 double); 2 surface
- Terrain parks: 3
- Snowfall: 260 in (660 cm) / year
- Website: snowbowl.ski

Arizona Snowbowl is an alpine ski resort in the southwest United States, located on the San Francisco Peaks of northern Arizona, fifteen miles (24 km) north of Flagstaff. The Snowbowl ski area covers approximately one percent of the San Francisco Peaks, and its slopes face west and northwest.

Starting its skiing operations 88 years ago in 1938, the base elevation of Arizona Snowbowl is at 9,200 feet (2,805 m) above sea level, and the resort receives an average annual snowfall of 260 inches (660 cm). The lift-served summit at 11,500 feet (3,505 m) yields a 2,300-foot (700 m) vertical drop, the largest in Arizona, served by two lodges, Hart Prairie Lodge and Agassiz Lodge, and six chairlifts, including one high-speed detachable chairlift and one high-speed gondola/chair hybrid lift.

== History ==
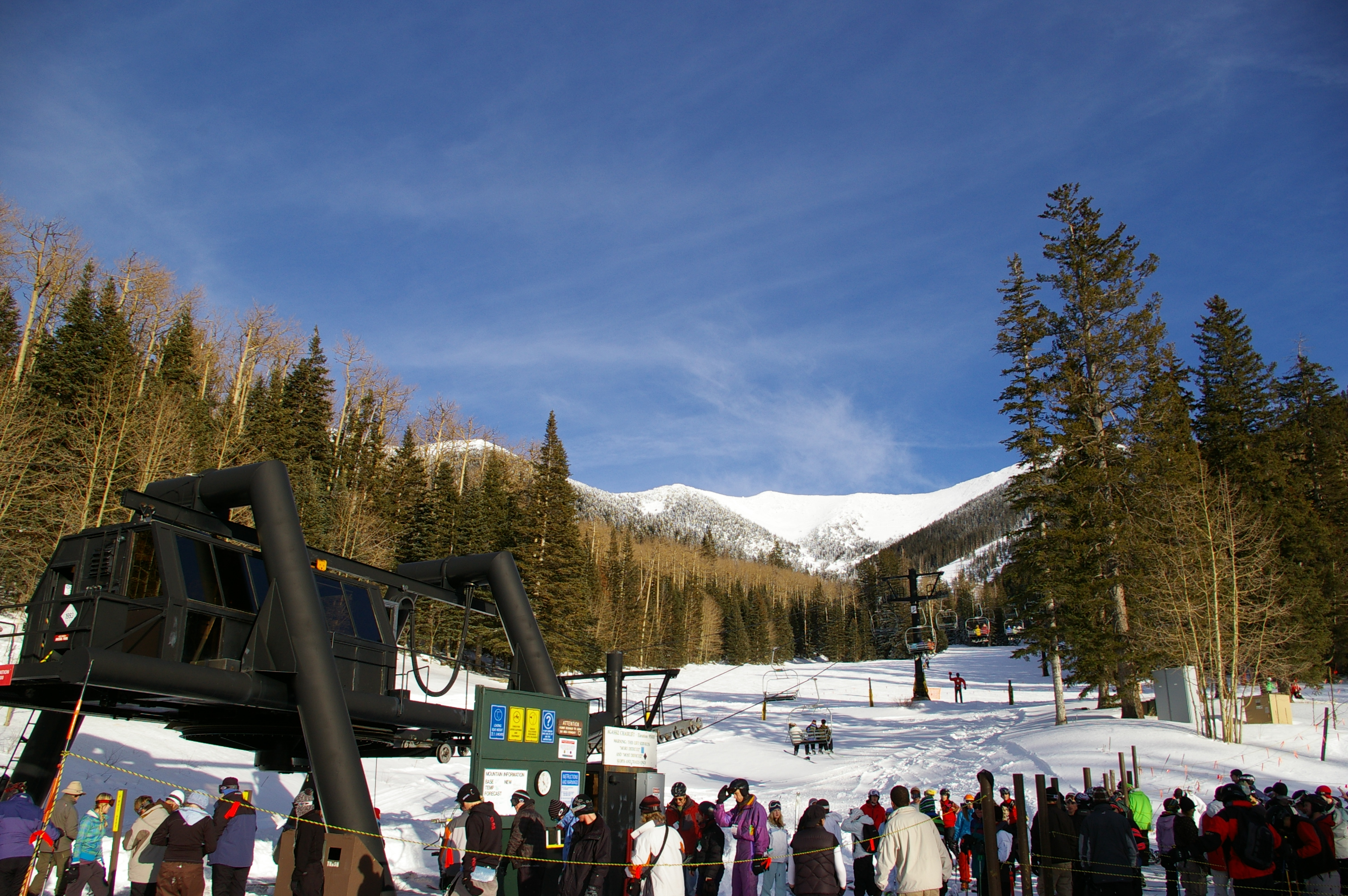
Snowbowl Ski Lift, 2008

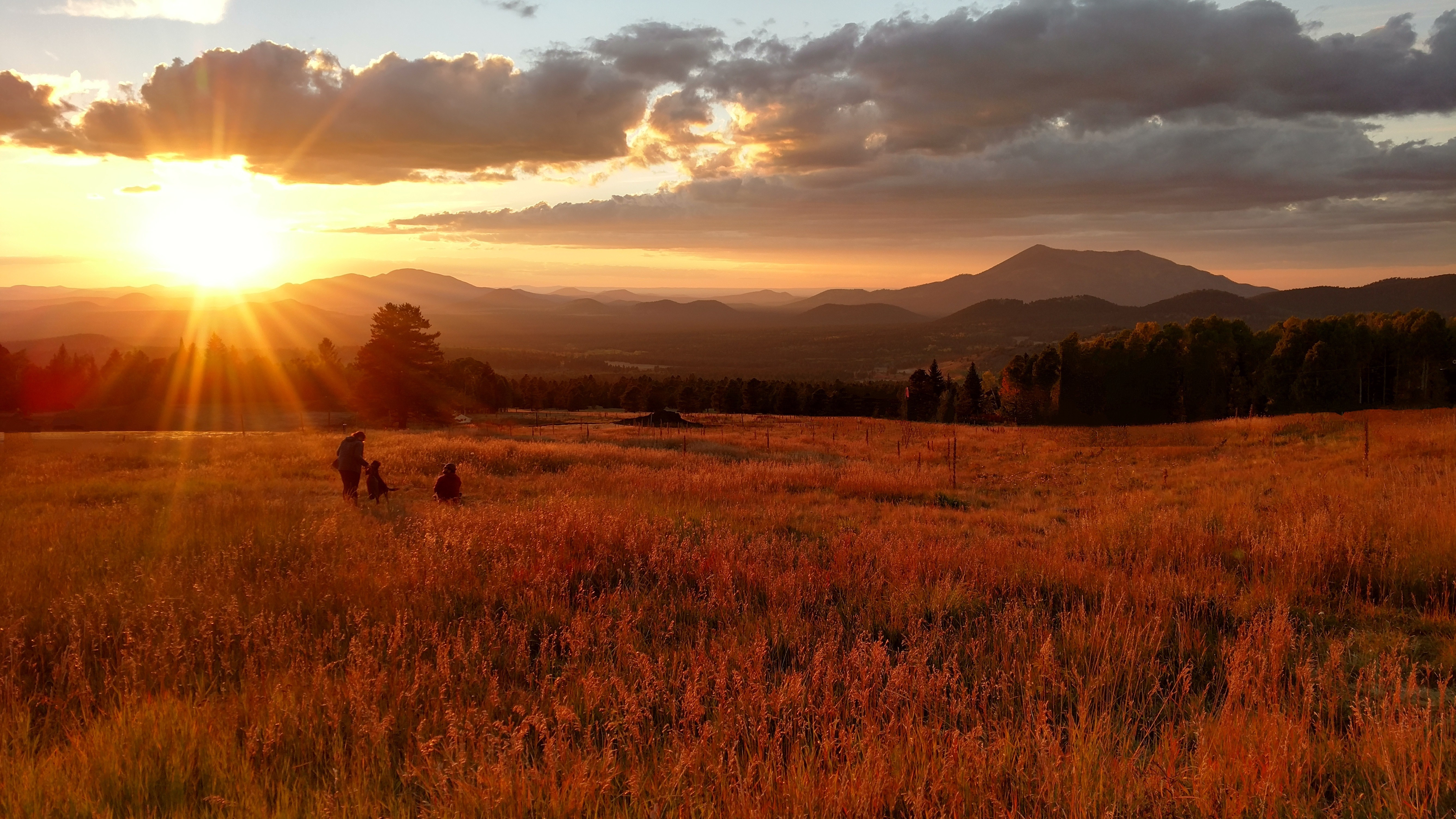
At the Snowbowl ski lift looking downhill (West) at Sunset, Fall 2021

Ole and Pete Solberg began the tradition of skiing in the Flagstaff area in 1915, when they used homemade wooden skis to glide down Mars Hill. In 1938, the US Forest Service permitted the construction of a road and ski lodge on the western slopes of the San Francisco Peaks, in Hart Prairie. The first notable transfer of the special-use permit and purchase of Snowbowl's ski facilities by a private entity was made in 1941 by Al Grasmoen and the Arnal Corporation.

The Arizona Snowbowl operates under a 777-acre (3.14 km^{2}) special use permit issued by the U.S. Forest Service and renewed every 40 years. Full-scale development, with shops, restaurants, and lodges were first proposed in 1969, but the opposition of several tribes and community groups delayed further construction.

Snowbowl resides on the San Francisco Peaks, which are held as sacred to 13 different Native American tribes in the region. These tribes include the Dine (Navajo), Apache, Hualapai, Yavapai, Hopi, and other Native Nations. Native people have used and continue to use The Peaks as a site for ceremonies and religious activities, including those related to the world's water and life cycles. The Hopi claim to have settled on this land dating back to 1150. Ultimately, the tribes lost the case and Snowbowl was allowed to expand. These tribes have lost all five lawsuits they have filed.

In 1979, the Forest Service approved a new lodge, a paved road, expanded parking, four new ski lifts and 50 acres (0.20 km^{2}) of trails to be added to the existing ski area which would grow to 777 acres (3.14 km^{2}). Again, the Native people of the area protested that this invasion harmed sacred areas and imperiled their religious freedom. As the chairman of the Hopi tribe warned, “If the ski resort remains or is expanded, our people will not accept the view that this is the sacred home of the Kachinas. The basis of our existence will become a mere fairy tale.” Despite Hopi and Navajo protests, the Forest Service regional supervisor in 1980 approved the paving of an access road into the ski area.

The Hopi and Navajo filed separate lawsuits to stop the development, while the Forest Service argued that religious rights would be unimpeded, and even facilitated, by the ski lifts—a concept that the tribes rejected. Three years later (the suits having been consolidated into one case, Wilson v. Block), the Hopi and Navajo were unable to convince the District of Columbia Circuit Court that the Peaks were "indispensable" to their religions, and the suit was denied. According to the judge, permitting the Snowbowl expansion may have offended their beliefs, but the Forest Service had met the basic provisions of the American Indian Religious Freedom Act of 1978. In the Wilson v. Block case, the Hopi and Navajo tribes also claimed that the Forest Service was violating the Endangered Species Act, the Wilderness Act, and the National Historic Preservation Act by using waste water on The Peaks.

In July 2008, a panel of the 9th Circuit Court of Appeals ruled in favor of the tribes. However, this decision was reversed by the full court. The court allowed the Snowbowl to use "Class A+ reclaimed water" to produce man-made snow, and to add upgrades of 2 new lifts, 10 more trails, and lodge expansions. The case was appealed to the U.S. Supreme Court on January 5, 2009. The Supreme Court denied the tribes' petition for certiorari, allowing the Snowbowl to continue with their proposed updates to the resort.

Following the onset of the reclaimed sewage water pipeline construction in 2011, Native American and environmental activists have launched ongoing protests against the Snowbowl. The treated sewage water that is being used for snowmaking has endocrine levels that are not determined by testing or regulation, which some people suggest has the potential to impact human health as well as fish and water quality in streams, though no scientific studies have been conducted to verify this. Twenty-five people were arrested between May and August 2011, including author and NPR commentator Mary Sojourner and Klee Benally, Diné singer/guitarist for the rock group Blackfire, who has been arrested twice since protests began.

On August 8, 2014, the city of Flagstaff approved a 20-year deal to sell reclaimed water to Arizona Snowbowl. Despite the adverse ruling allowing Snowbowl to use reclaimed water on the slopes, the Hopi Tribe filed a lawsuit to challenge the city's right to sell reclaimed water to Snowbowl.

Native American tribes and organizations, such as Protect the Peaks, continue to protest. In 2014 and 2015, the Snowbowl opened to protests of upwards of 50 people.

Proponents of this artificial snow say that with climate change, Snowbowl does not have to worry about losing business and helps Flagstaff's overall economy by bringing in tourists.

Also in 2014, Snowbowl was acquired by a group led by James Coleman, who also has ownership stakes in Pajarito and Sipapu in New Mexico. In the summer of 2015, Snowbowl announced $10 million in resort improvements as further development plans, including adding a new high-speed chairlift. To that end, the Grand Canyon Express (high-speed six-person chair) was installed and opened in late 2016. Additionally, in late 2020, the Arizona Snowbowl opened their new hybrid lift, called a Chondola, which is aptly named the Arizona Gondola (hybrid between a high-speed six-person chair and 8-person gondola after every 2 chairs). The new high-speed Arizona Gondola replaced the slow and outdated Agassiz lift. In the summer, the Arizona Gondola is fully flexible, and allows for varying combinations of gondola cabins and chairs.

== Local economy ==
Arizona Snowbowl does not publish their revenue or make it public knowledge, which makes it hard to calculate its impact on the Flagstaff economy. The Snowbowl supports approximately 200 full-time jobs and $12.08 million in economic output for the city of Flagstaff. Artificial snow allows Snowbowl to open earlier in the winter season and stay open later into the spring season.

== See also ==
- Sunrise Park Resort
