= Luzi AG =

Swiss fragrance company

- Type: Family business
- Industry: Chemicals
- Founded: 1926
- Founder: Hermann Luzi
- Headquarters: Dietlikon, Canton of Zurich, Switzerland
- Key people: CEO: Roland Altenburger
- Number of employees: 230
- Website: luzi.com

Luzi AG, headquartered and with production facilities in Dietlikon, Switzerland, is a major manufacturer of fragrances and flavors for perfumery, personal care, household, and industrial products. Luzi AG is one of the top 12 companies in its industry worldwide.

== History ==
The company was founded in 1926 by pharmacist Hermann Luzi. In 1952, the company was taken over by Eduard Altenburger. Since then, the Altenburger family has been running the company.

Luzi AG opened a branch in Malaysia in 2016, complete with its own production facility and development laboratories.

Luzi AG moved into a new building on an 11,000-square-metre site in Dietlikon, Zurich, in 2022.
