= List of aerial lift manufacturers =

This is a list of the current and former aerial lift manufacturers. This list includes surface lift manufacturers.

== Current ==
- Aarconinfra Ropeways & Future Mobility Pvt Ltd, India
- Anzen Sakudo – Japan
- Axet – Sweden
- BMHRI – China
- Borer – Switzerland
- Usha Breco Limited - India, founded in 1969 {http://ushabreco.com}
  - SunKid – Austria
- CCM Finotello – Italy, manufactured ropeways from the 1990s
- Damodar Ropeways & Infra Ltd (DRIL) – India
- Doppelmayr Garaventa Group – Austria, merging of Doppelmayr and Garaventa in 2002 (Note: Doppelmayr Holding SE operates various subsidiaries worldwide under the Doppelmayr and Garaventa brands. Seven of these are responsible for manufacturing parts, namely Doppelmayr Seilbahnen GmbH (Austria), Garaventa AG (Switzerland), Doppelmayr Canada Ltd., Sanhe Doppelmayr Transport Systems Co., Ltd. (China), Doppelmayr France SAS, Doppelmayr Italia Srl, and Doppelmayr USA, Inc. Doppelmayr has manufactured ropeways from 1937; Garaventa was founded in 1928.)
  - CWA Constructions – Switzerland, manufactured ropeway cabins from 1956, acquired by Doppelmayr in 2001 (Note: Company only manufactures cabins.)
  - Liftbyggarna – Sweden, founded in 1952, acquired by Doppelmayr Garaventa Group in 2013
  - Carvatech – Austria (Note: Swoboda Seilbahnbau GmbH ceased manufacturing ropeways, and was renamed Carvatech Karosserie- und Kabinenbau GmbH, known as Carvatech, in 2005.), acquired by Doppelmayr in 2022
- FOD – Serbia
- Gimar Montaz Mautino – France, merging of Gimar and Montaz Mautino in 1989
- Globe – Poland
- Graffer – Italy
- Him Cableways – India, founded in 1992
- Inauen-Schätti – Switzerland
- Hongji – China
- HTI Group – Italy (Note: No ropeways are manufactured under the HTI Group brand, however the company operates several subsidiaries manufacturing ropeways.)
  - Leitner Ropeways – Italy, founded in 1888 (Note: Leitner AG / SpA operates several subsidiaries worldwide manufacturing ropeways under the Leitner Ropeways brand, namely Leitner GmbH (Austria), Leitner France SAS, and Leitech s.r.o. (Slovakia).)
    - Agudio – Italy, founded in 1861
  - Poma – France, founded in 1936, acquired in 2000
    - Leitner-Poma – United States (Note: Leitner-Poma of America, Inc. is registered in the United States, and is operational throughout North America, with a subsidiary in Canada called Leitner-Poma Canada Inc. The company was founded in 1981 as Poma of America.)
      - Skytrac – United States, acquired by Leitner-Poma in 2016
    - Sigma Cabins – France, founded in 1961 (Note: Sigma Cabins is incorporated as Sigma Composite SA.)
    - Skirail – France, founded in 1981, acquired by Poma in 1987
  - Bartholet – Switzerland, manufactured ropeways from 1976, acquired by HTI in 2022 (Note: Bartholet was previously also known as BMF.)
    - Gangloff – Switzerland, founded in 1928, acquired by Bartholet in 2014
- MEB – Italy
- MND Ropeways – France (Note: LST Ropeway Systems was acquired by MND Group (France) in 2012, and was renamed MND Ropeways in September 2020. At the same time, the company merged with the French subsidiary of Bartholet.)
  - LST Ropeway Systems (Loipolder Seilbahn Technik) – Germany, acquired by MND Group in 2011
- M&M Ropeways – India
- Nippon Cable – Japan, founded in 1953
- REAC – Spain, founded in 1961
- Rowema – Switzerland (Note: Rowema AG succeeded GMD Müller Lifts AG in 1985.)
- SKADO – Russia
- SkyTrans – United States
- Steurer – Austria, manufactured ropeways from 1926 (Note: Ludwig Steurer Maschinen und Seilbahnenbau GmbH & Co KG is registered in Austria, and operates a subsidiary in Switzerland called Steurer Seilbahnen AG.)
- STM Sistem Teleferik – Turkey, founded in 1998
- Superior Tramway − United States, founded in 1981
- Sztokfisz - Poland
- Tatralift – Slovakia, founded in 1975 (Note: Tatralift was founded as TPMP Kežmarok, was renamed Tatrapoma in 1995, and became Tatralift in 2010.)
- Tosaku – Japan, founded in 1991 (Note: Tosaku is incorporated as Tokyo Cableway Co., Ltd.)
- TTC – Switzerland
- Vintertec – Finland
- Von Rotz & Wiedemar – Switzerland
- Umel Dalekovodmontaza d.o.o Tuzla -Bosnia and Herzegovina, since 1976, www.udm.ba

== Former ==
- Abig – Germany
- American Steel and Wire – United States
- Applevage – France, manufactured ropeways between the 1930s and 1962
- ATG – Germany
- Australasian Ropeway – Australia, manufactured chairlifts between the 1960s and 1970s
- Badoni – Italy
- Bell – Switzerland, manufactured ropeways between 1877 and 1968
- BM Lifts – Canada
- Breco – United Kingdom
- Cables & Monorail – France
- CECIL – France
- Ceretti & Tanfani – Italy
- Constam – Switzerland, founded in 1929
- Creissels (DCSA) – France
- De Pretis – Austria
- Drago – Italy
- Duport – France
- Funivie d'Italia – Italy
- Giovanola – Switzerland, manufactured ropeways between 1949 and the 1970s
- GMD Müller – Switzerland, founded in 1947, closed in 1985
- Hamilton – New Zealand (Note: The Hamilton Model B was the standard nutcracker tow across New Zealand and Australia in the 1950s and 1960s.)
- Heuss – Germany
- Hopkins – United States, founded in 1962, ropeway division acquired by SkyTrans in 2001
  - Roebling – United States, manufactured ropeways from 1940, acquired by Hopkins in 1965
- Imes – Italy
- Krupp – Germany
- Marchisio – Italy, founded in 1951, acquired by CCM Finotello in 1993 (Note: Marchisio was acquired by Doppelmayr in the 1980s. Doppelmayr sold the subsidiary to CCM Finotello in 1993.)
- McCallum – Australia, manufactured T-bars and chairlifts in the 1960s and 1970s
- Mécalift – France, founded in 1976, closed in 1981
  - Transcâble – France
- Miner-Denver – United States, founded in 1967, closed in 1970
- Mostostal – Poland, manufactured T-bars and chairlifts
- Murray-Latta – Canada
- Nascivera – Italy
- NSD Niederberger – Switzerland, founded in 1881, acquired by Inauen-Schätti in 2007 (Note: The ropeway division of NSD Niederberger was acquired by Inauen-Schätti in 2007, and went into liquidation shortly after.)
- Odermatt – Switzerland
- Pullman-Berry
  - Huntsinger Skilifts
- PWH – Germany
  - Pohlig-Heckel-Bleichert (PHB) – Germany, merging of Pohlig, Heckel, and Bleichert
- Riblet – United States, founded in 1908, closed in 2003
  - Ski Lift International – United States, founded in 1965, acquired by Riblet in 1973
- Ringer – Germany, founded in 1950, closed in 1953
- Sacif – Italy
- Samson – Canada, manufactured ropeways between the 1960s and 1988
- Sakgiproshakht – Soviet Georgia, founded in 1946, closed in 1990 (Note: Sakgiproshakht was founded in Chiatura, and later moved to Tbilisi. The company was in charge of developing and implementing most cable cars built in former Soviet Union Republics.)
  - Geospectrans – Georgia (Note: Geospectrans was a Tbilisi-situated division of Sakgiproshakht, now in charge of repairing and renovating Soviet-time ropeways in Georgia.)
- Skima – Switzerland
- Skyway – Canada, manufactured ropeways during the 1970s
- Stemag – Austria
- Streiff – Switzerland, acquired by Inauen-Schätti
- Swoboda – Austria, ropeway division founded in 1956
- Tbilisi Aircraft Manufacturing – Georgia (Note: Tbilisi Aircraft Manufacturing manufactured cabins for Sakgiproshakht developed ropeways from 1946 to 1990.)
- Teletrasporti – Italy
- Tiegel – United States, founded in 1959, ceased manufacturing ropeways in 1968
- Transporta Chrudim – Czechoslovakia
- Transtélé – France, founded in the 1970s, closed in 1979
- Trojer – Italy
- Vöest Alpine – Austria
- Weber – France
- Wiesner – Czechoslovakia
- Wito – Austria
  - Dolomitenwerk – Austria (Note: Wito was previously known as Dolomitenwerk.)
- Wopfner – Austria, founded in 1952, closed in 1996 (Note: Wopfner declared bankruptcy and ceased manufacturing in 1996. The company was succeeded by Seilbahnsysteme GmbH in 2004, which was renamed Seilbahn-Landschaft-Technik GmbH in 2011. This company licenses design rights to BMF Bartholet, LST Ropeway Systems, and STM Sistem Teleferik.)
- Wullschleger – Switzerland
- Yac – France, manufactured platter lifts
- Yan Lift – United States, founded in 1965, closed in 1996 (Note: Yan Lift was incorporated as Lift Engineering & Mfg. Co.)
- Zemella – Italy

=== Acquired by Doppelmayr/Garaventa Group ===
- CTEC – United States, founded in 1978, merged with Garaventa in 1992 (Note: CTEC merged with the Garaventa's United States subsidiary in 1992 to form Garaventa CTEC, which later merged with the Doppelmayr's United States subsidiary in 2002 to form Doppelmayr CTEC, and became Doppelmayr USA, known simply as Doppelmayr, from 2011.)
  - Partek – United States, founded in 1996, acquired by Doppelmayr CTEC in 2005
    - Borvig – United States, closed in 1993 (Note: The rights to Borvig designs were acquired by Partek.)
  - Thiokol – United States, ropeway division founded in 1971 and closed in 1977 (Note: The rights to Thiokol designs were acquired by CTEC in 1978.)
- Girak – Austria, acquired by Garaventa in 1996 (Note: 50% of Girak was acquired by Garaventa in 1996 and became Girak-Garaventa. The remainder was acquired by Doppelmayr Garaventa Group in 2002 and the Girak name was discontinued.)
- Hölzl – Italy, founded in 1945, acquired by Doppelmayr in 2002 (Note: Agamatic was founded in 1981 as a joint venture between Hölzl and Doppelmayr Lana. In 2002, Agamatic, Hölzl, and Doppelmayr Lana merged to form Doppelmayr Italia.)
  - Agamatic – Italy, founded in 1981, merged with Doppelmayr in 2002
- Küpfer – Switzerland, founded in 1948, merged with Garaventa in 1985 (Note: The company manufactured some ropeways as Garaventa-Küpfer for a few years following the merger.)
- Von Roll – Switzerland, ropeway division acquired by Doppelmayr in 1996
  - Bühler – Switzerland, founded in 1962, acquired by Von Roll in 1975
  - Habegger – Switzerland, manufactured ropeways from 1945, acquired by Von Roll in 1982 (Note: Habegger was founded in 1943. Following financial difficulties in 1980 the company was acquired by the Bernese Cantonal Bank, and the ropeway division was acquired by Von Roll in 1982. The company manufactured some ropeways as Von Roll-Habegger until 1991.)
    - Brändle – Switzerland
      - Sameli-Huber – Switzerland
    - Oehler – Switzerland, ropeway division acquired by Habegger in the 1970s
  - Hall Ski-Lift – United States, founded in 1954, merged with Von Roll in 1982
- WSO Städeli – Switzerland, manufactured ropeways from 1957, acquired by Garaventa in 1991
  - Tebru – Switzerland, acquired by WSO Städeli

=== Acquired by HTI Group ===
- Baco – Switzerland, founded in 1950, acquired by Poma in 1981 (Note: The company manufactured some ropeways as Baco-Poma for a few years following the acquisition. Baco AG ceased manufacturing ropeways, however the company is still active, representing Leitner Ropeways and Poma in Switzerland.)
- Carlevaro & Savio – Italy, acquired by Agudio
- Heron – United States, acquired by Poma (Note: The company manufactured some ropeways as Heron-Poma for a few years following the acquisition.)
- Montagner – France, founded in 1968, acquired by Poma in 1994
- SACMI – France, founded in 1960, acquired by Poma (Note: SACMI ceased manufacturing ropeways, however the company still manufactures components and pre-assembled parts for Poma's ropeways.)
- Waagner-Biro – Austria, ropeway division acquired by Leitner Ropeways in 1999
