= Carlevaro & Savio =

Italian ropeway manufacturer

Carlevaro & Savio was a manufacturer of aerial ropeways originally based in Turin, Italy. The company was well known for their early gondola lifts, having built the world's first detachable gondola lift in Alagna Valsesia, in 1949.

Their design was known for its lattice towers as well as its futuristic gondola cabins. When they went bankrupt, they were bought by Agudio. Carlevaro & Savio built gondolas at Sugarbush, Mt. Snow, Killington, Wildcat, Crested Butte, Beech Mountain, Cherokee and Silver Springs Amusement Park. The early gondola cabins were made of metal, and the later models were fiberglass. These gondola lifts were also sometimes branded as the Telecar. The two-seater Carlevaro-Savio gondola car was nicknamed the "Noon Balloon."

== See also ==
- List of aerial lift manufacturers
