= Melaka Aerorail =

Proposed monorail line in Malacca City, Malaysia

Melaka Aerorail (Note: This monorail project uses the Malay-language spelling of the state's name, as opposed to the more traditional English spelling, "Malacca") is a proposed monorail line to be constructed in Malacca City, in Malaysia. It will be built in two phases: 9.5 km for the first one, and 8.7 km for the second. The cost of construction is expected to be around RM1.8 billion. If successful, it will be the first aerorail network in Malaysia as well as in Asia. The project has been postponed indefinitely, however.

== Stations ==
=== First phase ===
The first phase of the project, which was supposed to commence in 2010, involves a distance of 9.5 km and would cost around RM586 million. It is intended to include ten transit stations: Ayer Keroh Toll Plaza, Malacca Zoo, Melaka International Trade Centre, Malacca City Council Square, Melaka Mall, Malacca General Hospital, Melaka Sentral, Hang Tuah Mall, Stadthuys, Mahkota Medical Centre, and Dataran Pahlawan Melaka Megamall. It will also involve a stopover hotel in each station.

=== Second phase ===
The second phase, involving a distance of 8.7 kilometers, will cost around RM807 million. If successful, it will be extended to Alor Gajah and Jasin District.

== Management ==
Pyramid Express will build, operate, and manage the aerorail system. Technical and project management support will come from Pinggiran Pelangi Sdn Bhd.

== Criticism ==
The Association for the Improvement of Mass-Transit-Klang Valley — TRANSIT has criticised the project and urged the state government to improve its public bus service first. The project has also been criticised by the state's Opposition Members of Legislative Assembly.

== See also ==
- Monorails in Malaysia
- Kuala Lumpur Monorail
- Melaka Monorail
- List of rapid transit systems
- List of monorail systems
