= Hybrid lift =

Type of ski lift

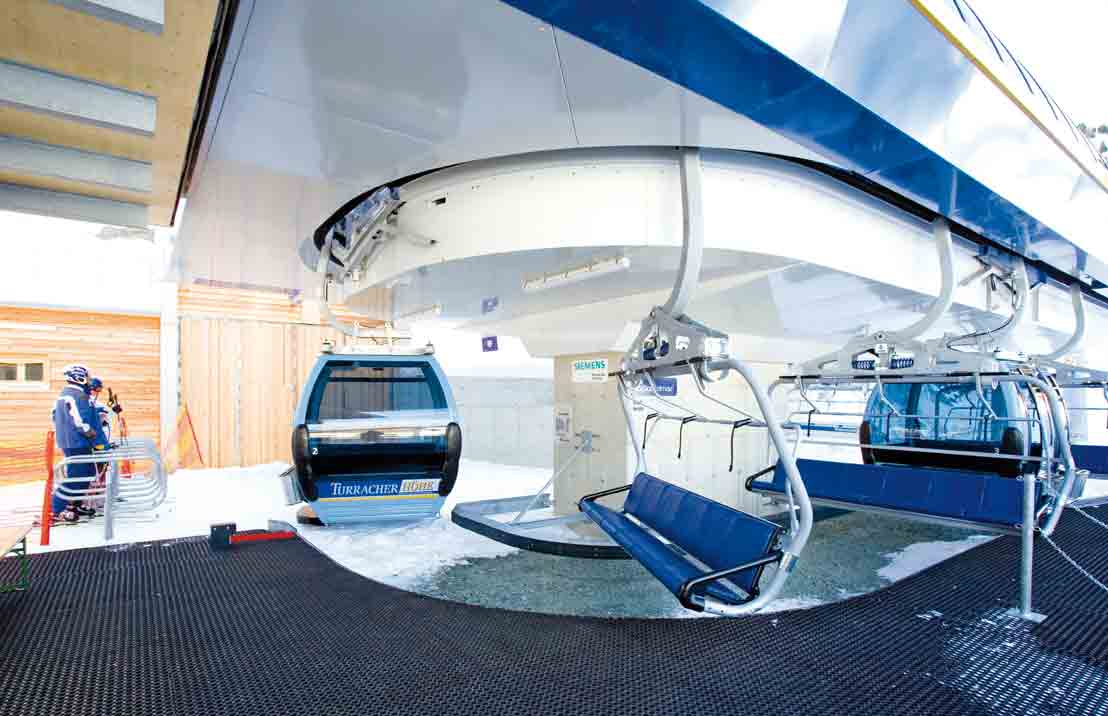
The "Panorama Bahn" hybrid lift in Turracher Höhe, Austria. Chairs load from the station on the left of this image, gondolas along the carpeted area to the right.

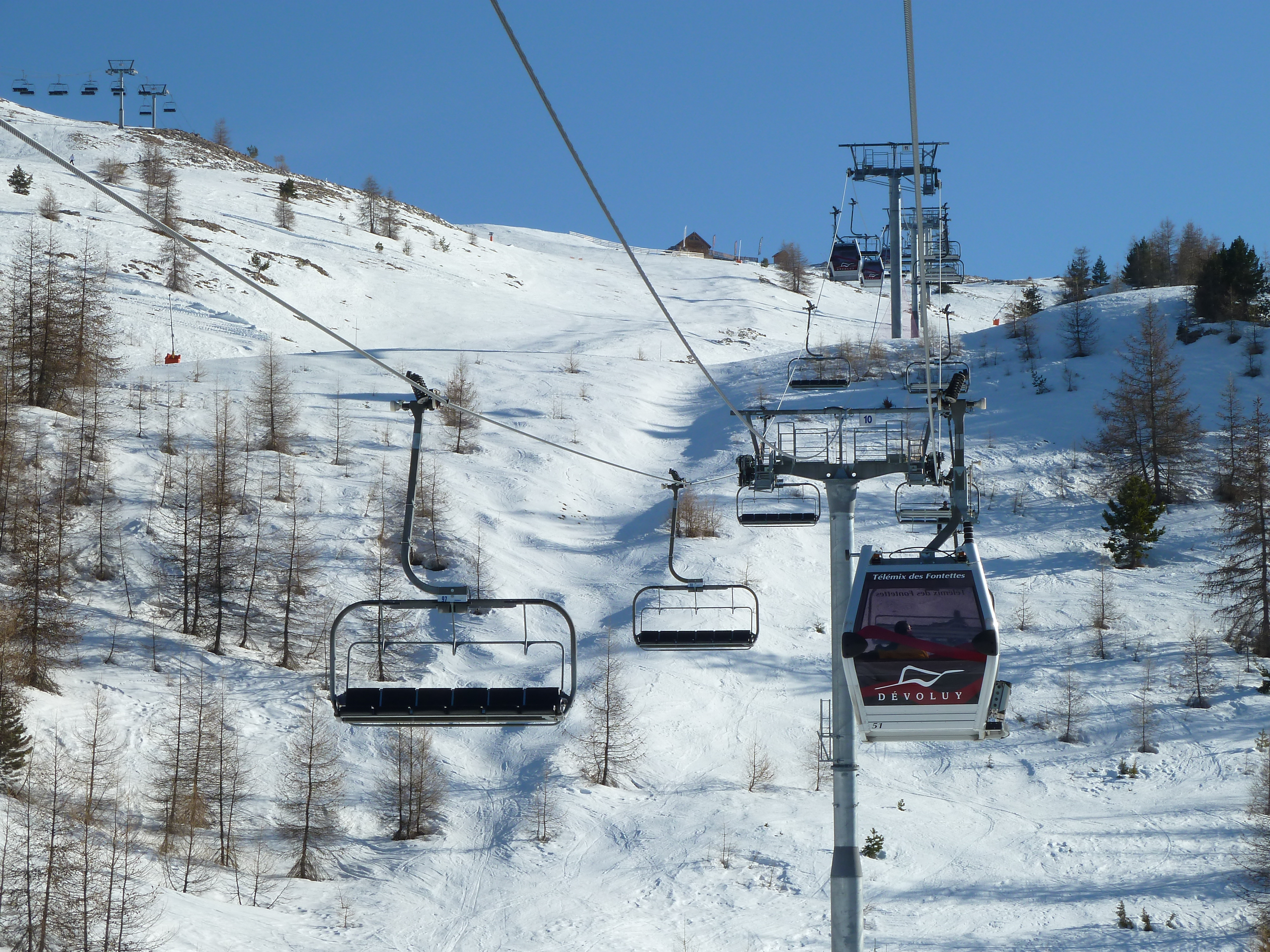
"Les Fontettes" in La Joue du Loup, Dévoluy, France.

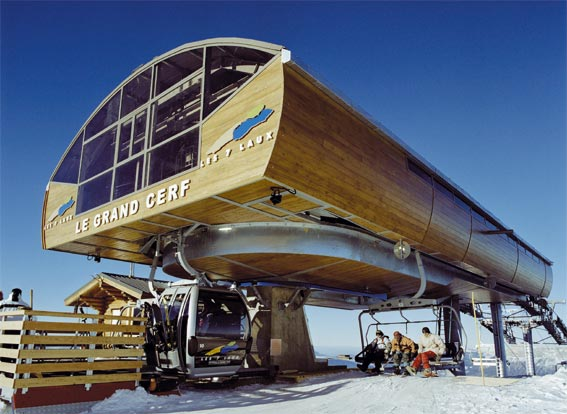
The top of Doppelmayr's "Le Grand Cerf" at Les Sept Laux, outside of Grenoble, France. Chairs exit to the right, gondolas on the left.

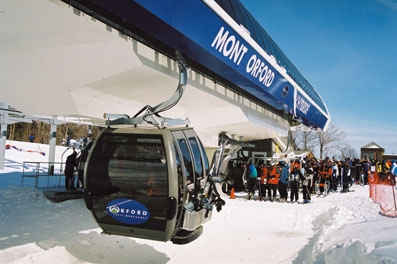
Le Hybrid, Mont Orford, Canada

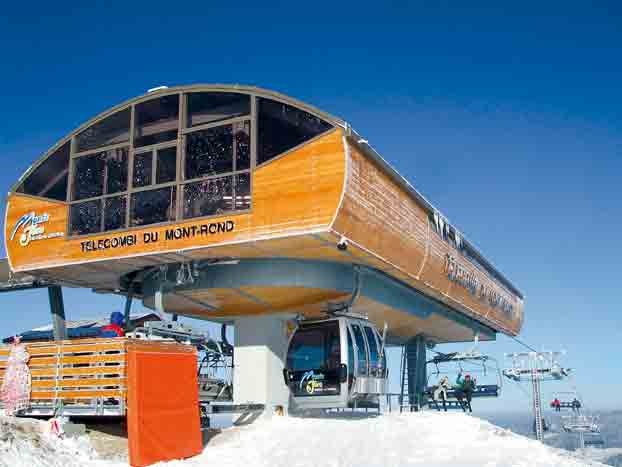
Telecomb Du Mont-Rond, France

A hybrid lift is a type of ski lift that combines the elements of a chairlift and a gondola lift. First introduced by Poma, who refers to them as Telemix, they have since been built by most lift manufacturers who refer to them by a variety of names; Doppelmayr refers to them as a combined lift, Bartholet refers to them with the French name, téléporté mixte, while the more generic terms chondola and telecombi are common in North America.

Both chairs and gondolas have advantages for lift operations. Gondolas offer protection from the elements and are particularly useful in rain or very cold conditions. They can also be used during the summer for walk-on guests, cyclists or wheelchairs, and in the winter for snowshoers. In the winter, gondolas require skiers and snowboarders to remove their equipment and walk into the cabin. Chairs are generally more convenient and easier to board for skiers. Some lifts have so-called 'bubble' chairs, which add a retractable acrylic glass dome to protect passengers from weather.

A hybrid lift allows cabins and chairs to be used on the same lift line, changing the ratio as the rider load, season and weather conditions demand. On most hybrid lifts, during the winter season there are usually more chairs than cabins, for example, the hybrid lift at Sunday River has 60 chairs and 15 cabins, with four chairs between each cabin. During the summer season, many hybrid lifts will operate with fewer chairs, or with gondola cabins only. Year-round versatility is increasingly important as ski resorts add summertime activities, such as downhill cycling and nature hiking trails.

To allow safe loading and unloading, stations have separate areas for the different carrier types. This may resembling a gondola station followed by a chairlift station, or vice versa – the overall length of the boarding area can be reduced by folding the station so that the gondolas are loaded on the "downhill" side of the ends of the lift, and the chairs on the uphill side. In some stations the cabins may use a separate contour.

== Installations around the world ==
=== Australia ===
Australia has two ski lifts that mix gondolas and chairs. Northside Express (formerly named Horse Hill) built in 1986 at Mount Buller in the state of Victoria was the first Doppelmayr hybrid lift in the world. It has 106 chairs and 20 gondolas. The second to be built in Australia was the 1860-metre-long Crackenback (since renamed Kosciusko Express), built in 1990 at Thredbo ski resort in New South Wales. It was also built by Doppelmayr.

=== Europe ===
In Austria, the "Sun Jet" was finished in 2008 on the mountain of Hochwurzen, Schladming. In 2010 the "Kombibahn Penken" in Mayrhofen, Austria was built. This was the first hybrid lift with separated loading areas for chairs and gondolas. The "Weibermahdbahn" in Lech in Vorarlberg was built in 2011 by Doppelmayr for the Ski Arlberg ski resort. It alternates between 8-person chairlifts and 10-person gondolas. In 2013 the "Auenfeldjet", a gondola lift for 10 persons, was linked to it.

In France, Poma has installed at least ten hybrid lifts, and Doppelmayr three. One is the "Mont Rond", which consists of one eight-passenger gondola cabin, and three six-passenger chairs. "Le Grand Cerf" in Les 7 Laux, France consists of a six-passenger chair and an eight-passenger gondola.

In Greece, the Ski Center of "Parnassos" has two hybrid ski lifts which combine eight-seater cabins and six-seater chairs. Aphrodite–Bacchus was built in 2014 and its total length is 2250 m. Hermes–Iniochos was built in 2015 in order to link two resorts together Kellaria and Fterolaka. Its total length is 2010 m.

In Italy, the Telemix "Puflatsch" at the Seiser Alm was built in 2009.

In Norway, the ski mountain Strandafjellet installed a Leitner Telemix lift in the summer of 2010. The lift has 3 six-passenger chairs followed by one eight-passenger gondola. The lift opened on February 12. 2011, and is the biggest chairlift in Scandinavia. The lift is 2100 metres long, has a 618 metres height difference and a capacity of 2400 people per hour per direction.

In Slovakia, a Telemix at the Donovaly ski resort was installed by Poma in 2005. It has 60 chairs and 10 cabins.

Sweden's first hybrid lift was installed in Åre ski resort in Åre, Sweden. The new hybrid lift is named 'VM 8:an' and replaces the former four-passenger chair lift 'Olympialiften'. The lift was installed by Leitner in 2006 and consists of 16 eight-passenger gondola cabins, and 68 eight-passenger chairs.

In Verbier, Switzerland, lift manufacturer Leitner Ropeways installed a hybrid lift, "La Chaux Express", in 2005. The 20 cabins, manufactured by CWA, each hold 8 passengers whilst the 60 chairlifts can each hold up to 6. The result is a maximum capacity of 1950 to 2400 persons per hour. The lift also has multiple stations; the valley station at 2200 m, and the middle at 2484 m which angles the route of the lift, allowing the second lower station at 2260 m. The middle station is most commonly disembarked during the ski season as it lies in the "middle" of the slopes. This provides a connection for skiers not willing to ascend entirely, for instance, to the Col des Gentianes (2950 m).

=== North America ===
The Hybrid (French: l'hybride), at Mont Orford in Quebec, Canada, is a 6-passenger chair/8-seater gondola cabin that replaced a double-chair in 2008. Bromont, 86 kilometers east of Montreal, replaced a 1985-built high speed quadruple by a 6/8 chondola in 2018, making it Canada's second chondola after Orford's Hybrid.

In the United States, a chondola was opened at Sunday River Resort in 2008, combining a high speed six pack with eight passenger gondola cabins, with gondola cabins every four chairs.

Chondolas also exist in the Tahoe Zephyr at Northstar Resort in Lake Tahoe (hybrid between a high-speed six-chair and a high-speed eight-person gondola). Three chondolas operate within Colorado, including the Chondola at Telluride Ski Resort (hybrid between a high-speed quad and a four-person gondola), the Centennial Express at Beaver Creek Resort (high speed six pack, with ten-passenger gondola cabins after every five chairs) and the American Eagle lift at Copper Mountain Resort (high speed six pack, with eight passenger gondola cabins every four chairs). The Arizona Snowbowl in Flagstaff is the most recent US resort to add a Chondola, as it was completed in late 2020 and is aptly named the Arizona Gondola (hybrid between a high-speed six-person chair and 8-person gondola after every 2 chairs). In the summer, the Arizona Gondola is fully flexible, and allows for varying combinations of gondola cabins and chairs.

Also in the United States are several lifts that can be converted as needed into gondola operations, For example, the Big Mountain Express at Whitefish Mountain Resort in Montana is a high speed quad that runs with all chairs in the winter but runs with chairs and cabins during the summer. Wildcat ski area in New Hampshire converts their quad chair to a gondola during the summer months.

== See also ==
- Ski lifts
- List of aerial lift manufacturers
