= Poma =

French company

Pomagalski S.A.
- Industry: Cable-driven lift systems
- Founded: 1936
- Founder: Jean Pomagalski
- Headquarters: Voreppe
- Revenue: €343 million (2016)
- Number of employees: 1100
- Parent: HTI Group
- Subsidiaries: Leitner-Poma
- Website: poma.net/en

Poma, incorporated as Pomagalski S.A., and sometimes referred to as the Poma Group, is a French company which manufactures cable-driven lift systems, including fixed and detachable chairlifts, gondola lifts, funiculars, aerial tramways, people movers, and surface lifts. Poma has installed about 7800 devices for 750 customers worldwide.

Poma's only major competitor is the Doppelmayr Garaventa Group which is based in Austria and Switzerland. Italy's Leitner Ropeways was historically another competitor until 2000 when Poma became part of Seeber Group (now HTI Group). Poma and Leitner remain independent, but formed a strategic partnership which includes the combined purchase of raw materials and the formation of Leitner-Poma as a joint venture in North America.

The majority of Poma's lifts are used in ski areas in Europe, Asia, and North America (as Leitner-Poma), they have also installed installations in amusement parks, scenic locations, and industrial transportation applications.

In some areas Poma lift is used as a generic term for a platter lift, as this was the company's first and most popular product.

== History ==
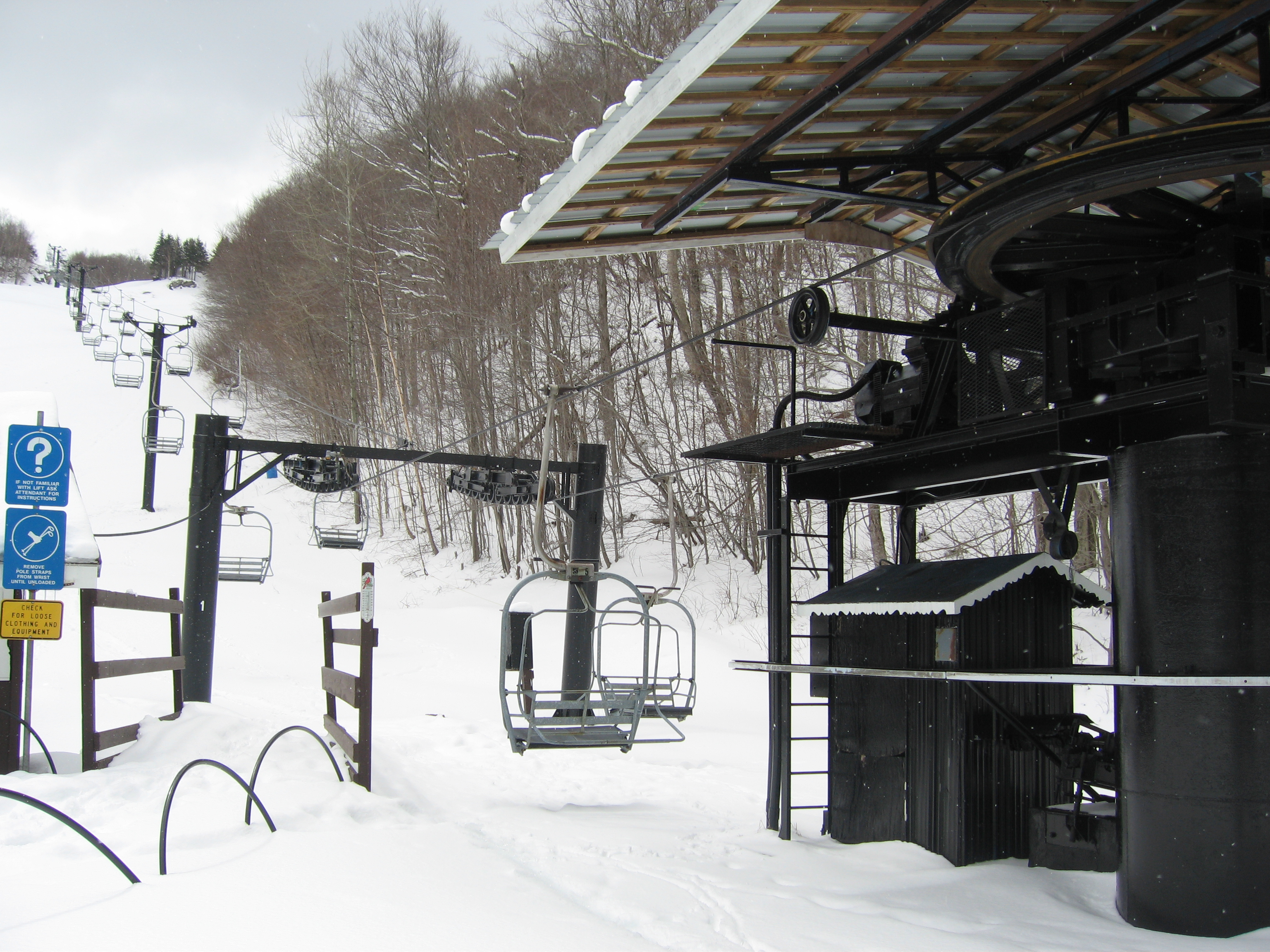
A 1960s Poma double chairlift in Vermont, USA

In 1936, Jean Pomagalski (born 1905, Kraków) installed his first ski lift on the Eclose Trail in l'Alpe d'Huez in France. In 1947, he founded Pomagalski S.A. in Fontaine, France. The first Poma single-seater chairlift was built in 1955 in Chamonix, France, using parts from drag lifts, and the first 2-seater chairlifts were built in 1958 in France and the United States. 1966-67 brought the first detachable gondolas built by Poma. The prototype gondola by Poma was the La Daille gondola at Val D'Isere and installed in 1966 but demolished and replaced in 2018. The corporate headquarters and the production shops are still in Fontaine, but since 1988 most of their management, design engineering, sales and service offices are in Voreppe, France. Poma currently employs approximately 750 people worldwide.

Early Poma chairlifts were installed at Squaw Valley, California for the 1960 Winter Olympics. Poma also supplied lifts for the Olympic Winter Games at Sarajevo, Yugoslavia in 1984, at Albertville, France in 1992, at Lillehammer, Norway in 1994 and has worked on the lifts for the 2014 Games at Sochi, Russia.

== Products ==
=== Circulating ropeways ===
==== Fixed grip chairlifts ====
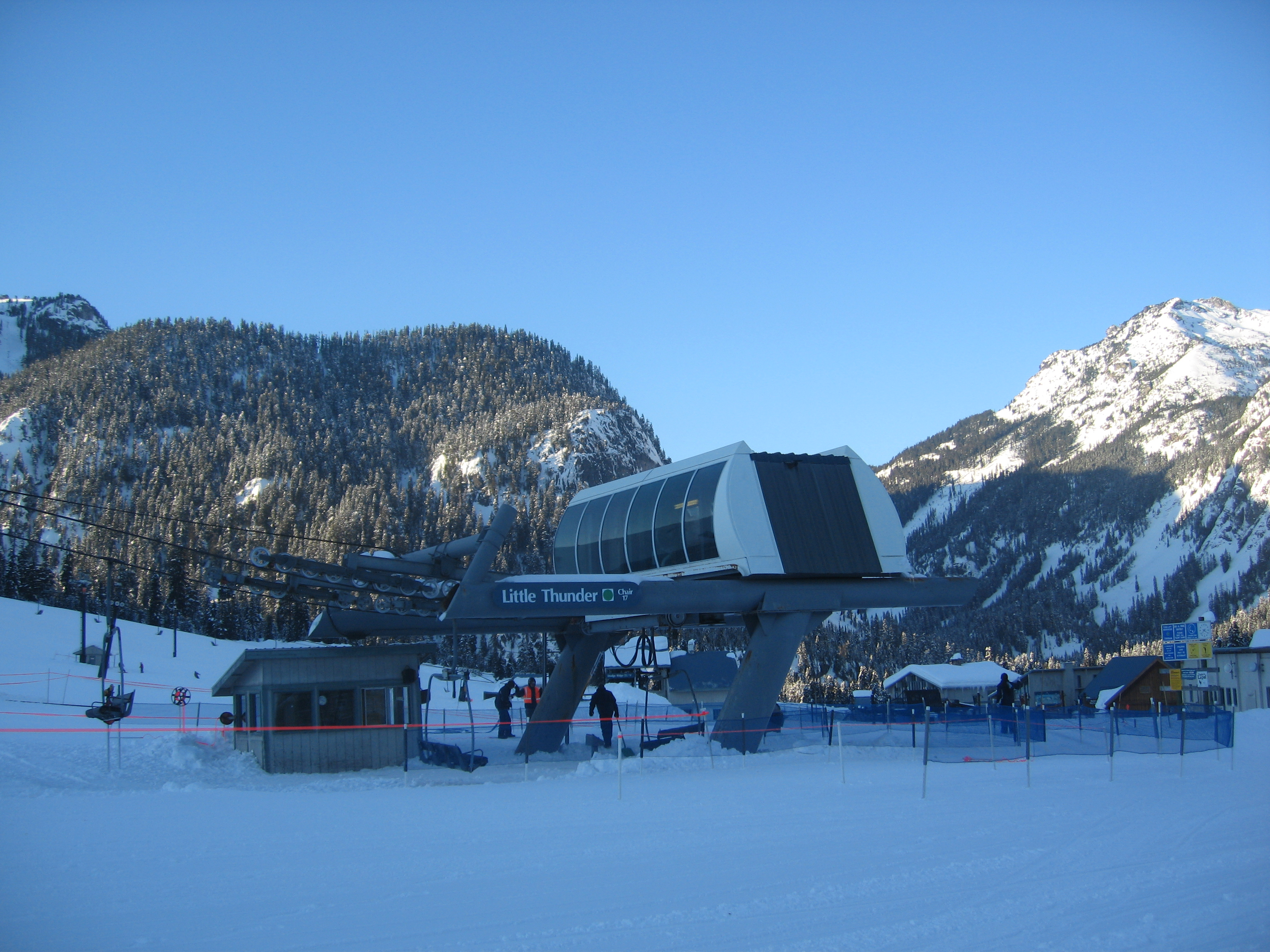
A Poma fixed grip Alpha model chairlift at the Summit at Snoqualmie, Washington, USA

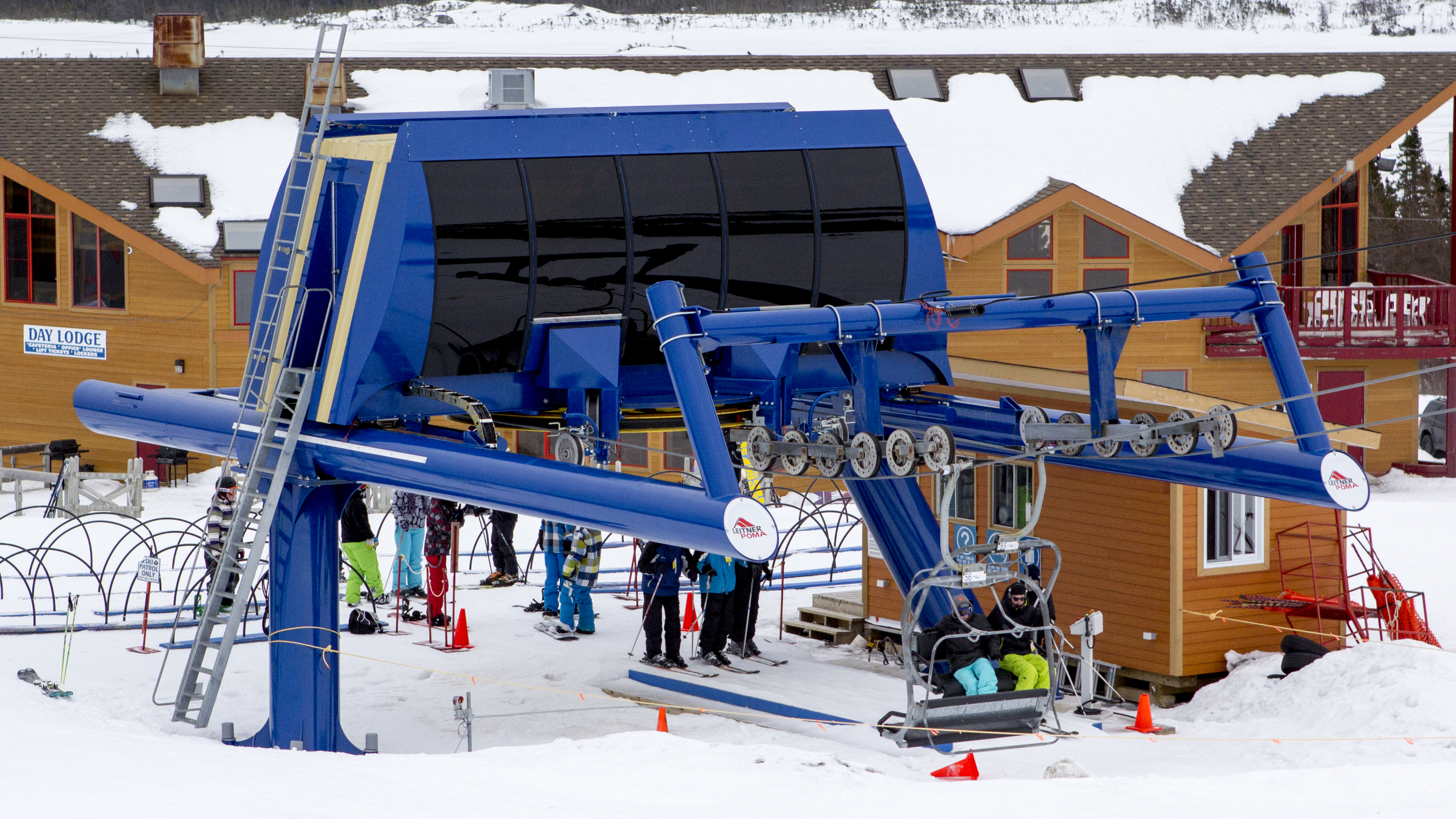
A Poma fixed grip Alpha terminal at White Hills Ski Resort near Clarenville, NL Canada

Poma's fixed grip chairlifts have proven popular throughout the world. Poma's first two-seater fixed grip chairlift was constructed in 1958. Following this, the three-seater chairlift was introduced in 1973. This was followed by four-seater, and more recently six seater fixed grip chairlifts.

The Alpha chairlift terminal was introduced in 1982 and continues to be popular today, however now they are currently only manufactured in North America. Prior to the Alpha terminal, Delta terminals were used. This type of terminal was such a great success that even presently a majority can still be seen operating worldwide. Both the Delta and Alpha chairlift terminals have the capability of being converted into detachable lifts later on, thus increasing the chairlift's capacity without constructing an entirely new installation.

==== Detachable chairlifts ====
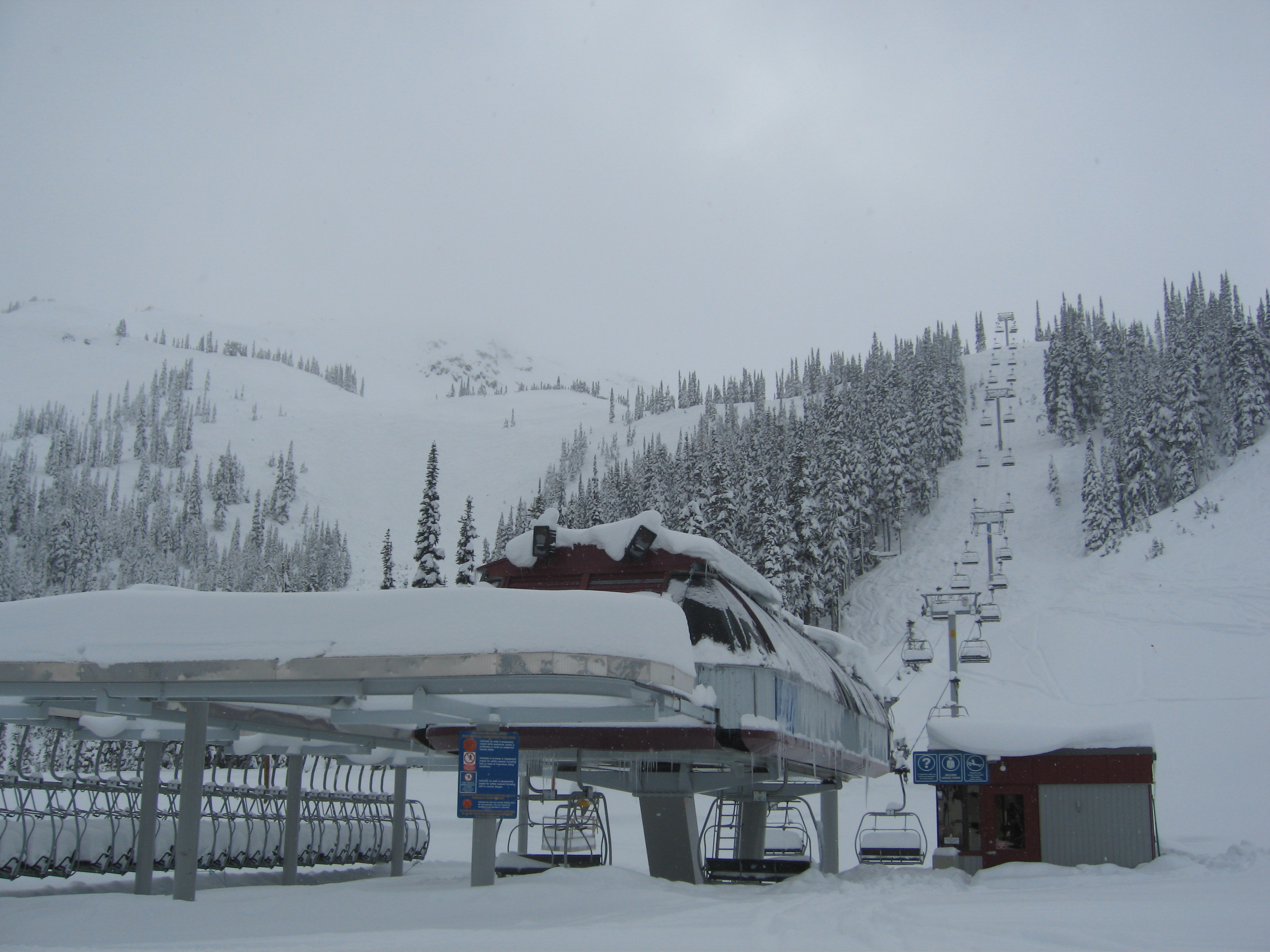
A Challenger model Poma detachable chairlift at Whistler, Canada

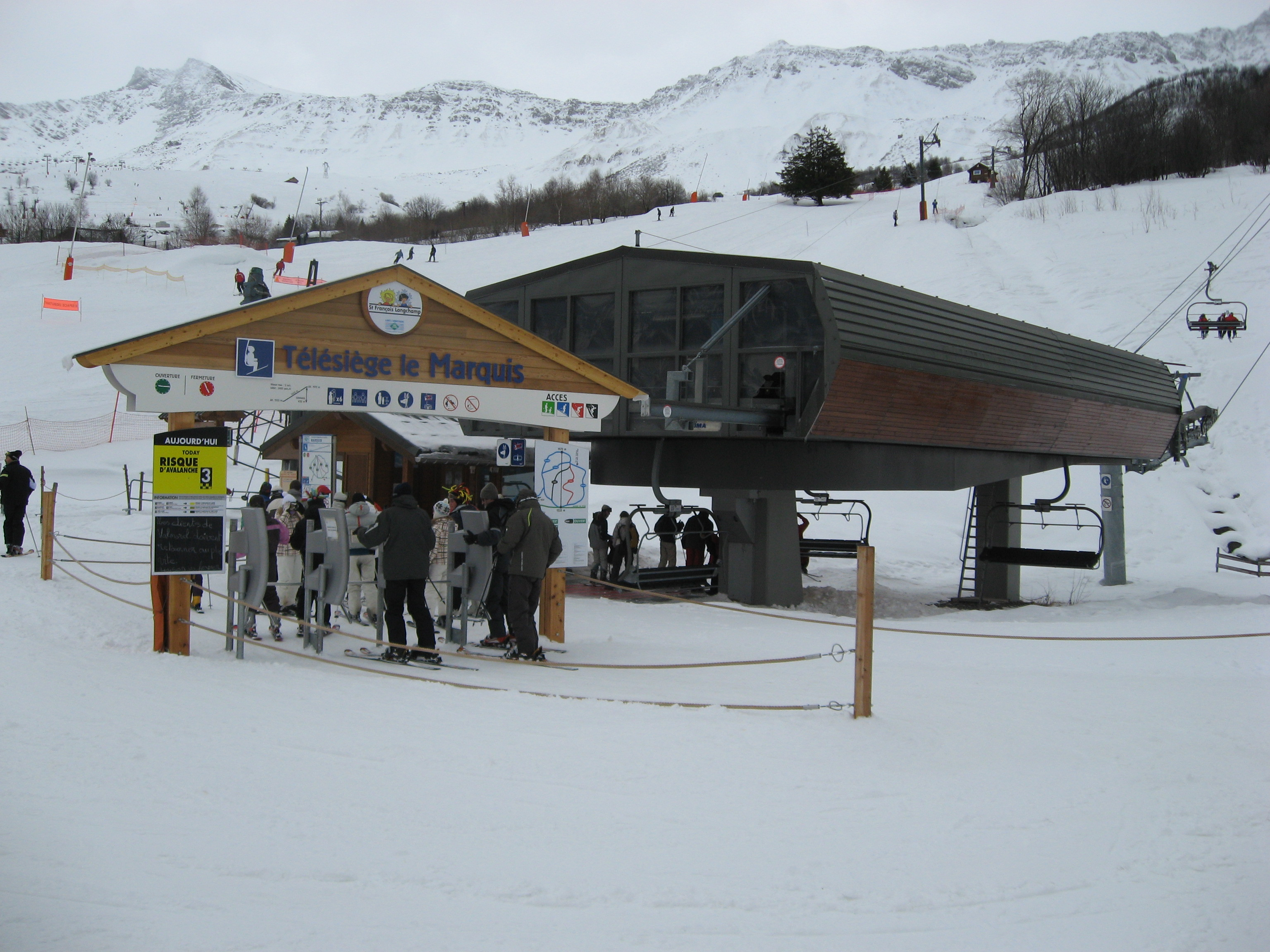
A Satellite six-seater detachable telesiege in Saint-François-Longchamp, France.

Poma introduced detachable chairlifts in 1972 in Pralognan-la-Vanoise (Dou de l'Ecu) and Saint-Lary (Soum de Matte). In 1982, Poma built a detachable chairlifts with an operating speed of 5 m/s - which, at the time, was the fastest in the world. In 1991, Poma unveiled their Omega detachable terminal(first Omega lift was the Loyes chairlift in Val D'Isere) which was more compact than previous terminals. The company built its first six-passenger detachable chairlift in 1993(Le Tour, Avoriaz) and its first eight-passenger lift was constructed in Méribel, France in the year 2000. Also in 2000, the company replaced the Omega line of detachable terminals with the new Satellite model. In addition, In 2005, Poma also have now introduced the Multix terminals in their detachable chairlifts(which are actually Leitner designs, with the only difference being the station's facade and, before the 2020s, the main bull/pulleywheels), while new North American lifts feature the new LPA terminal.

==== Gondola lifts ====
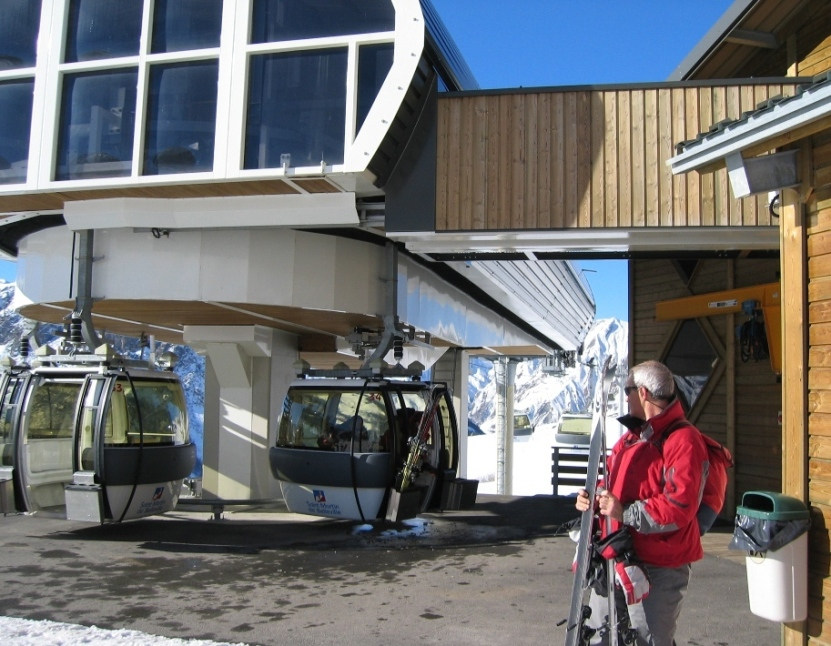
Eight-seater gondola, built in 2001, in Saint-Martin de Belleville, Savoie, France.

Poma built its first detachable gondolas in Val d'Isere and Queenstown (New Zealand) in 1966, and then, its first automatic gondolas in Chalmazel, Les Menuires (France) in 1967. It built the world's first six-passenger monocable gondola in 1973(the Madrid gondola lift and the former Grande Rochette gondola lift in La Plagne were built earlier, but were bicable lifts), also in France in Villard-de-Lans. The world's first ten-passenger gondola was built by the company in 1984(La Patinoire in La Clusaz), followed by the world's first 16-passenger version in 1998 in Les Angles(Les Pelerins), in the French Pyrenees.

==== Funitels ====
The company has built three funitels to date: the Funitel du Grand Fond, a detachable funitel built in 2001, the Funitel du Bouquetin, a fixed grip jig-back funitel built in 2003 (both located at Val Thorens in France) and the more recent Funitel de la Perdrix in Super-Besse, France, which was built in 2008 and is the first Funitel to feature the shared mechanics of Leitner and Poma.

==== Hybrid lifts ====
Telemix is Poma's brand name for a detachable lift that is equipped with both gondola cabins and chairs. The terminal stations are the same as the company's detachable gondolas and chairlifts. These are common in the French resort of Alpe d'Huez.

==== Surface lifts ====
Poma's first model was the Pomalift, a surface lift with a disk that skiers straddle. It has the ability to travel at high speeds because the platters are detachable from the haul rope, and because the perch is telescopic and has a pneumatic system which allows for a smooth and progressive departure. They are still sold today along with T-Bars and fixed grip platters.

=== Reversible aerial tramways ===
Poma has built a number of large aerial tramways. In 2003, Poma built the world's largest reversible ropeway to connect the French resorts of Les Arcs and La Plagne, the Vanoise Express. The double decker tramway can hold up to 200 people at a time in each cabin. In 2010, Poma worked on the replacement of the Roosevelt Island Tramway in New York, using a design based mechanically on the Vanoise Express.

=== Funiculars and people movers ===
Poma has built numerous funiculars which are cable driven railways that can climb steep pitches. Poma also had a partnership with Otis Elevator, known as "Poma-Otis Transportation Systems", to build Automated People Movers.

== Gallery ==
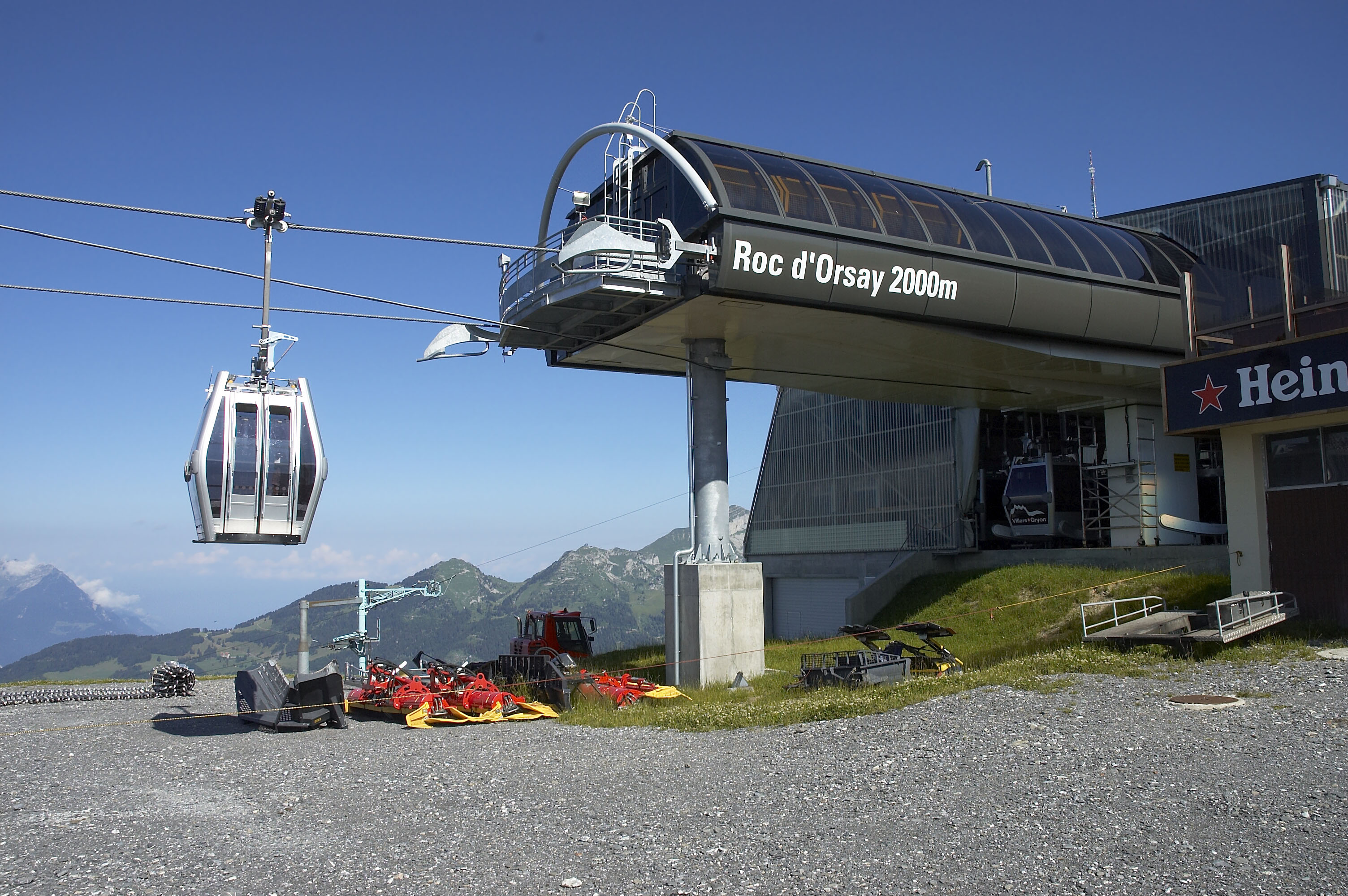
'Roc d'Orsay' 8-seater gondola constructed in 2006, in Villars, Switzerland.

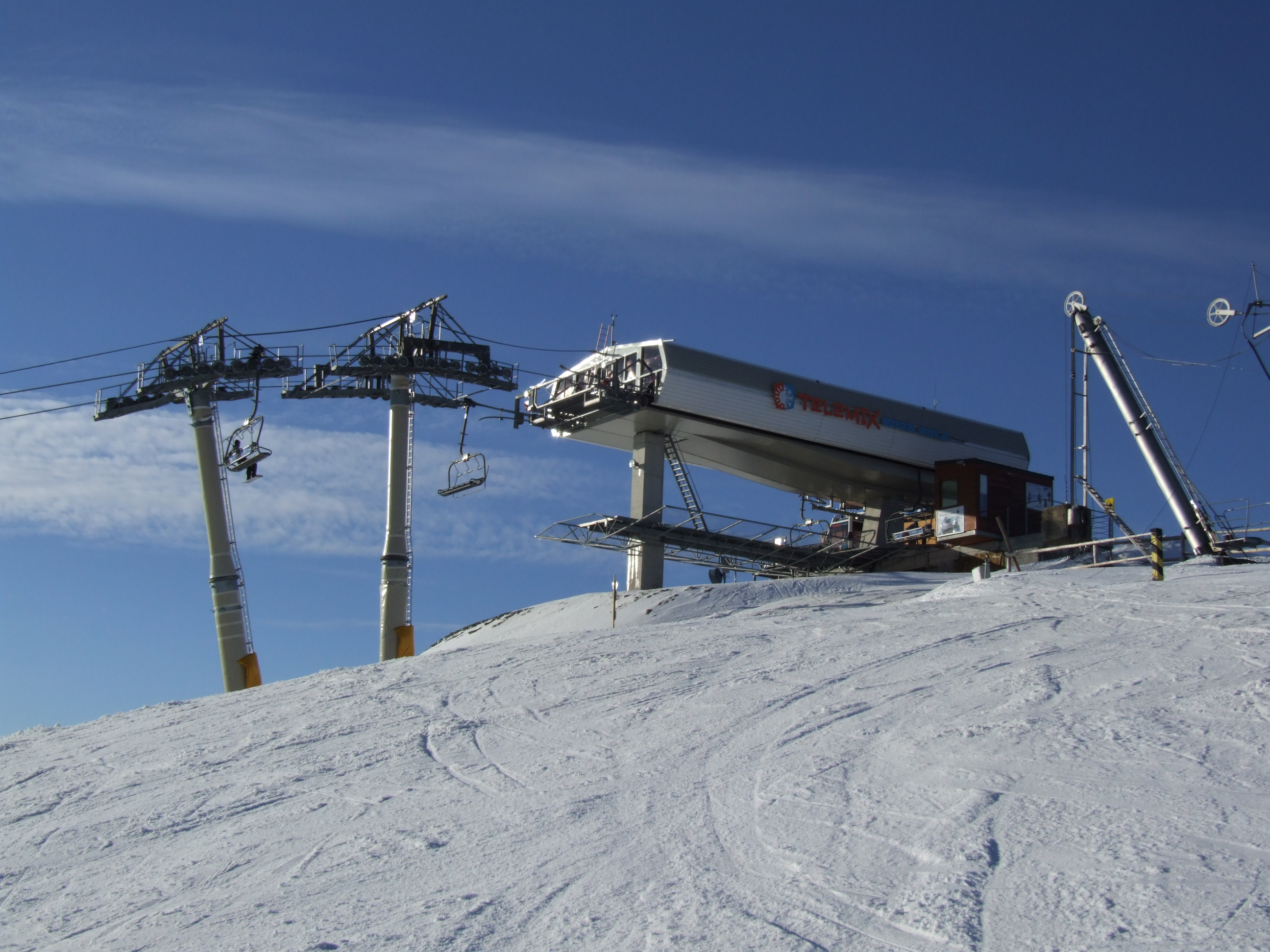
Telemix in Donovaly, Slovakia

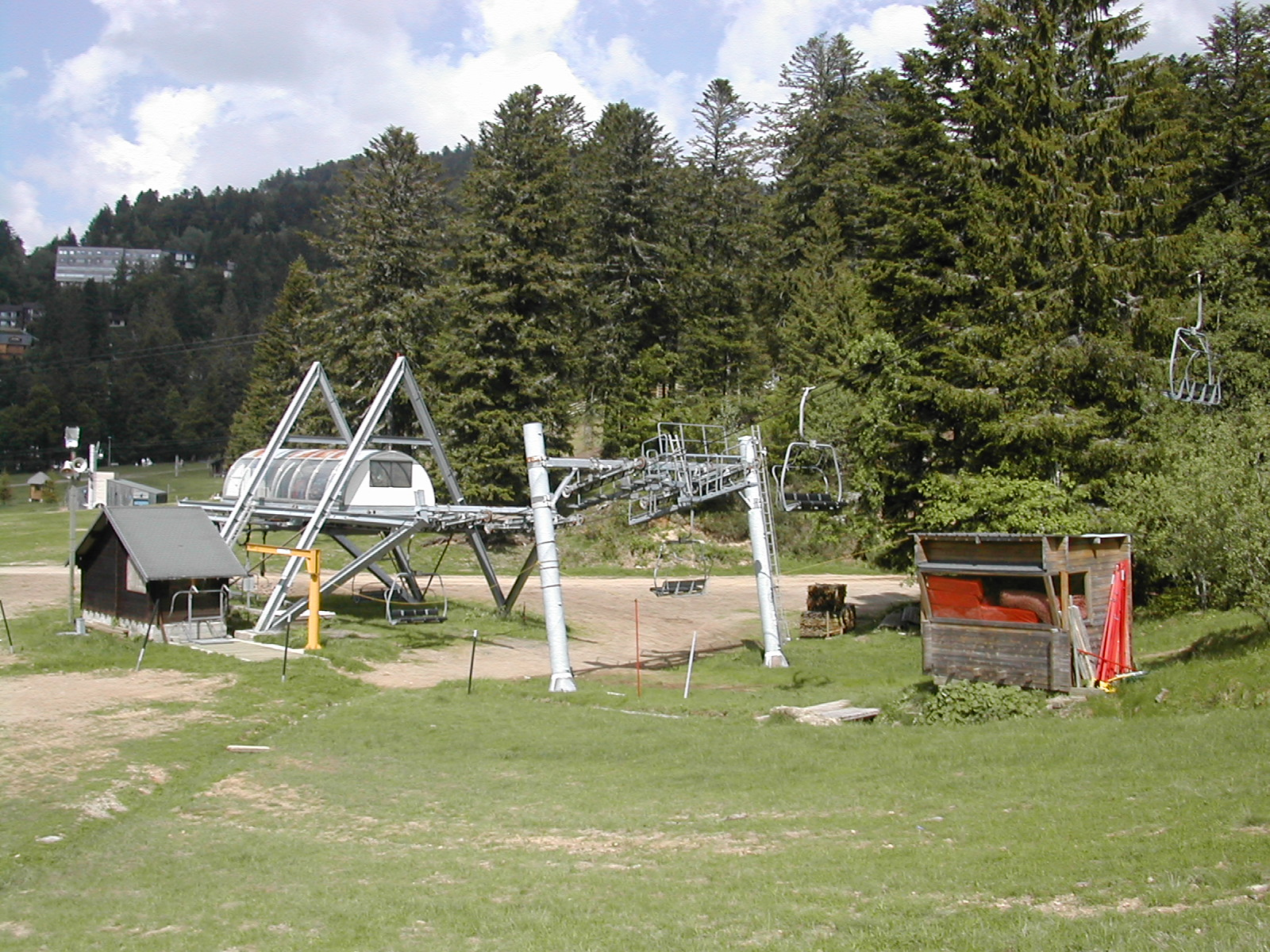
Fixed-grip chairlift, with Delta terminal built in 1986 in Le Lioran, France.

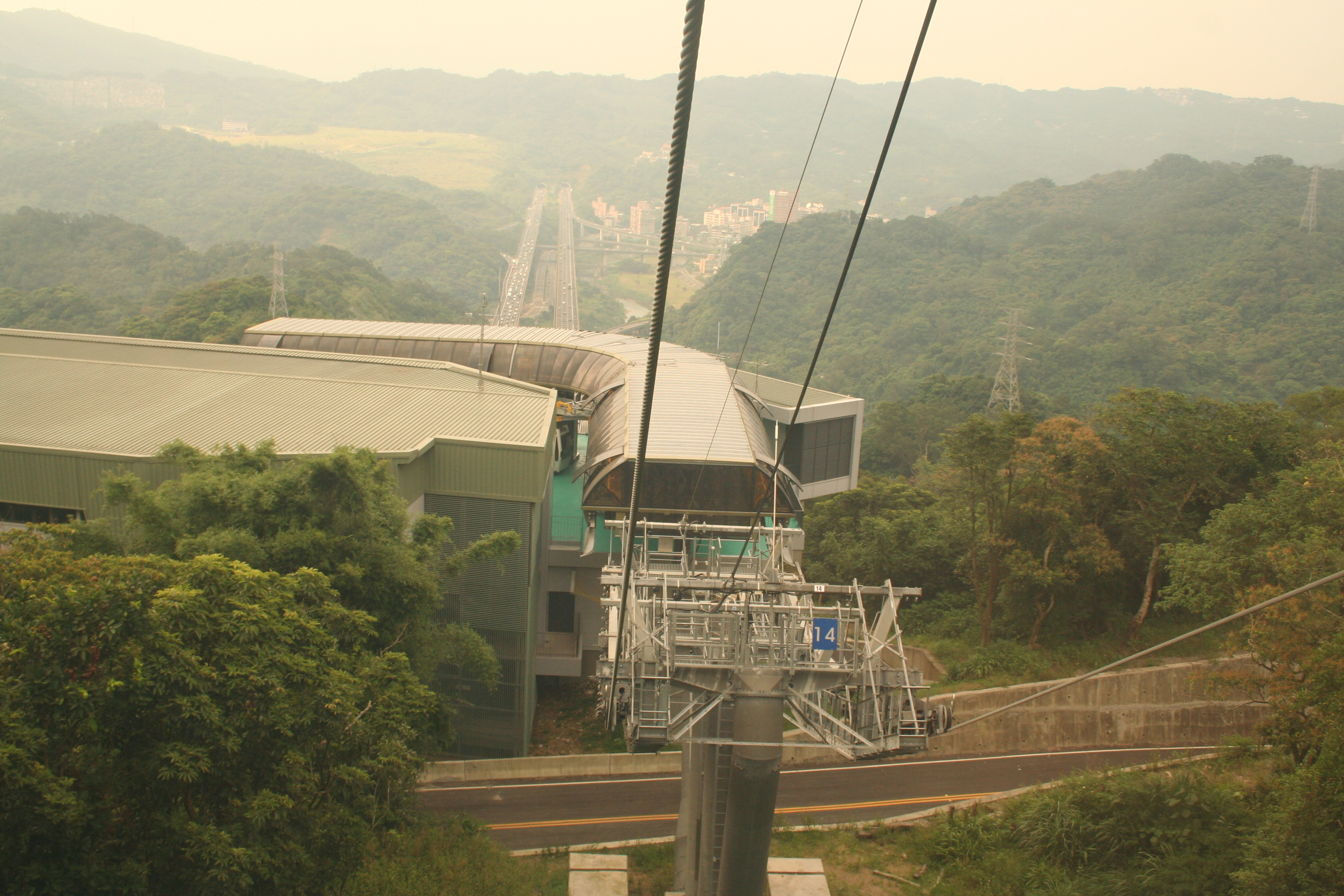
Maokong Gondola - corner two station and National Highway No. 3, in Taiwan.

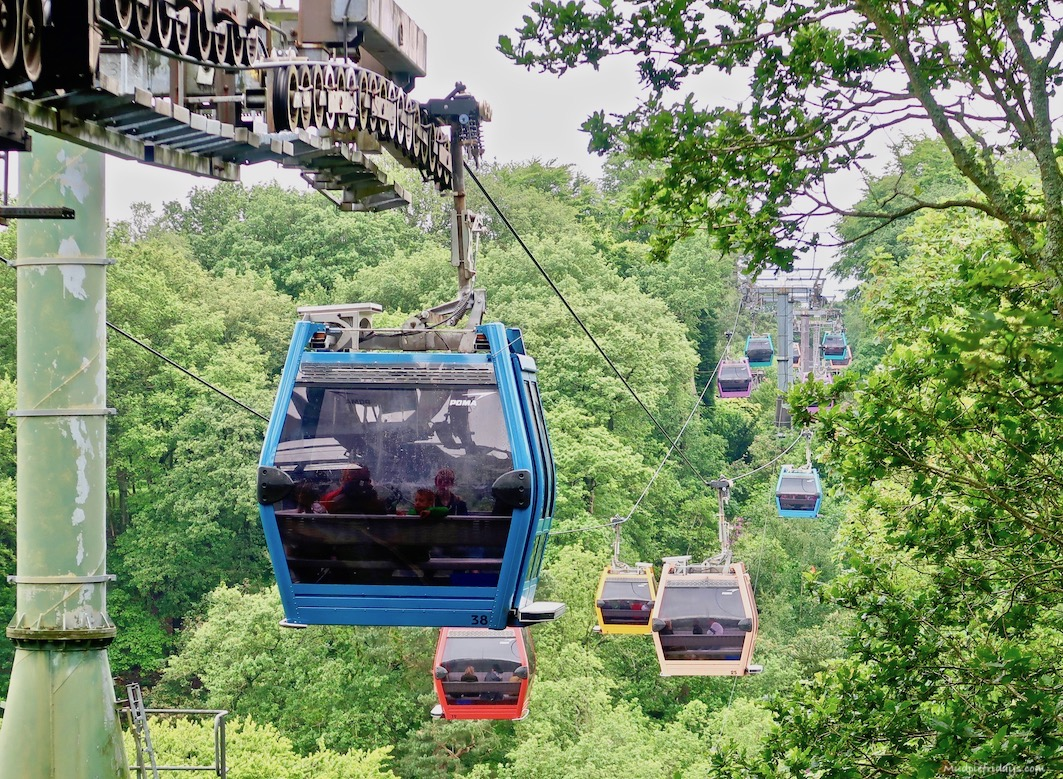
Skyride, a 10 seater detachable gondola lift built in 1987 at Alton Towers, UK.

== Subsidiaries ==
Leitner-Poma
Leitner-Poma of America, Inc. builds lifts in North America, Australia, and New Zealand. Leitner-Poma offers the full line of Poma products and manufactures most of the components at its headquarters in Grand Junction, Colorado.

Poma came to North America in the early 1950s under the name of Pomalift, Inc., installing its first lift in Canada in 1952 and in the US in 1953. Pomalift Inc. changed its name to Poma of America in 1981 with the establishment of its office and factory at Grand Junction, Colorado. Since 1989, all detachable chairs for North America, New Zealand, and Australia have been designed and built in Colorado. In September 2001, the merger of Poma and Leitner's North American operations was announced forming Leitner-Poma of America.

Sigma Cabins
Founded in 1961 and incorporated as Sigma Composite SA, this company is based in Veyrins, Isère, France, and manufactures cabins for HTI Group's ropeways and people movers. The company also produces cabins for other applications such as ferris wheels. Its competitors are Doppelmayr subsidiary CWA; Bartholet subsidiary Gangloff; and Carvatech.

Skirail
Skirail designs and builds inclined lifts, chairlifts, funicular railways and Cyclocables. The company was founded in 1981, and was acquired by Poma in 1987. Despite the takeover, Skirail continued to manufacture their own chairlifts until 2011(their last lift was the Valbelle-Razis chairlift in Risoul, France).

Baco
Baco AG was founded in 1950, and was acquired by Poma in 1981. Baco ceased manufacturing ropeways, however the company is still active, operating for Poma and Leitner Ropeways in Switzerland.

Comag
Comag SAS is based in Bourg-Saint-Maurice, Savoie, France, and operates as Poma's civil engineering and mountain installations company.

SACMI
Société Savoyarde de Construction et de Matériel Industriel, known as SACMI, was founded in 1960, and was later acquired by Poma. The company is located in Gilly-sur-Isère, France, and manufactures mechanically welded components and other pre-assembled parts for Poma's ropeways.

Semer
Semer SA is based in le Fayet, Haute-Savoie, France, it is responsible for the automation and electronics used in Poma Group's products.

There is also a network of overseas subsidiaries such as Leitner Poma Japan and Poma Beijing Ropeways.

In 1975 a License Agreement for production of ropeway systems designed for the passenger transport took place between Pomagalski s. a. and TPMP Kežmarok (then Czechoslovakia, now Slovakia). Based on the License Agreement production of skilifts named "Tatrapoma" has commenced. The agreement ended in 1991, but TPMP Kežmarok continued to manufacture ski lifts ever since (now as Tatralift).

== See also ==
- Ski lifts
- List of aerial lift manufacturers
- Maokong Gondola
- Nizhny Novgorod cable car
