= Leitner Ropeways =

Aerial ropeway manufacturing company based in South Tyrol, Italy

Leitner AG / SpA
- Industry: Ropeways, Cable Cars
- Founded: 1888; 138 years ago
- Founder: Gabriel Leitner
- Headquarters: Sterzing, Italy
- Number of employees: (3849)
- Parent: HTI Group
- Website: leitner.com/en

Leitner Ropeways is an Italian company that manufactures and distributes products and equipment for ropeway systems, snow groomers, urban transportation systems, and wind energy in Italy and internationally. The company was founded in 1888 and was recognized in 2003 to be owned by the Leitner Group, later the HTI Group. The company also provides spare parts, repairs and testing. As of 2018 it had 11 production plants in Italy, France, Austria, Slovenia and North America, 65 subsidiaries and 132 service centres worldwide.

In addition of Leitner, HTI Group also owns Poma (and its North American subsidiary Leitner-Poma), Bartholet, and Agudio. Combined, HTI Group is one of the leading companies in the sector, with the other major entrant being the Doppelmayr/Garaventa Group.

== Products ==
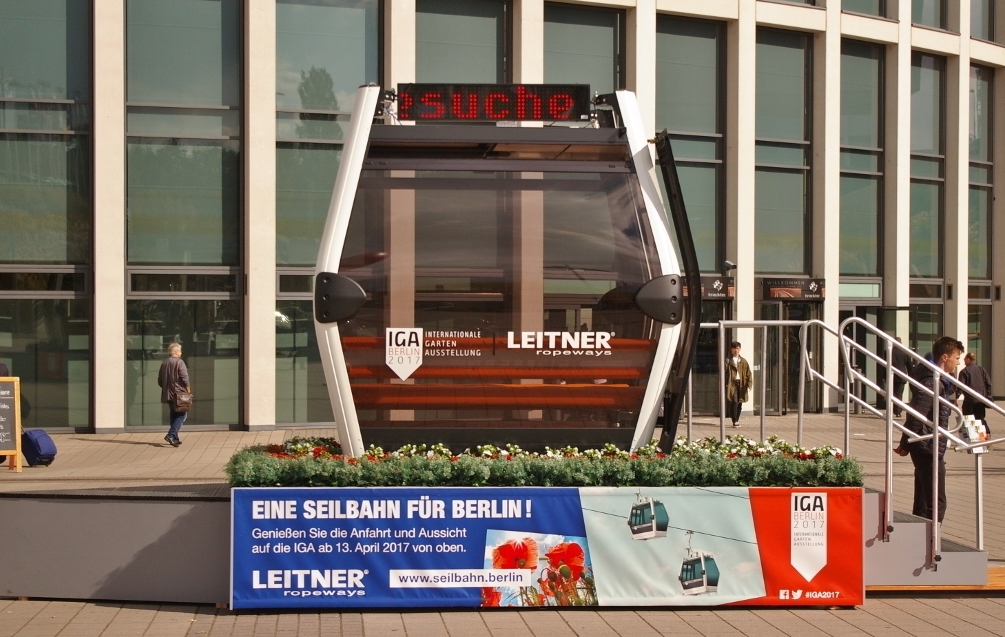
A Leitner ropeways gondola on display at InnoTrans 2016.

Leitner Ropeways manufactures various types of ropeways, such as fixed-grip and detachable chairlifts; monocable, bicable, and tricable gondola lifts; telemix; surface lifts; aerial tramways; funiculars; and inclined elevators.

== History ==
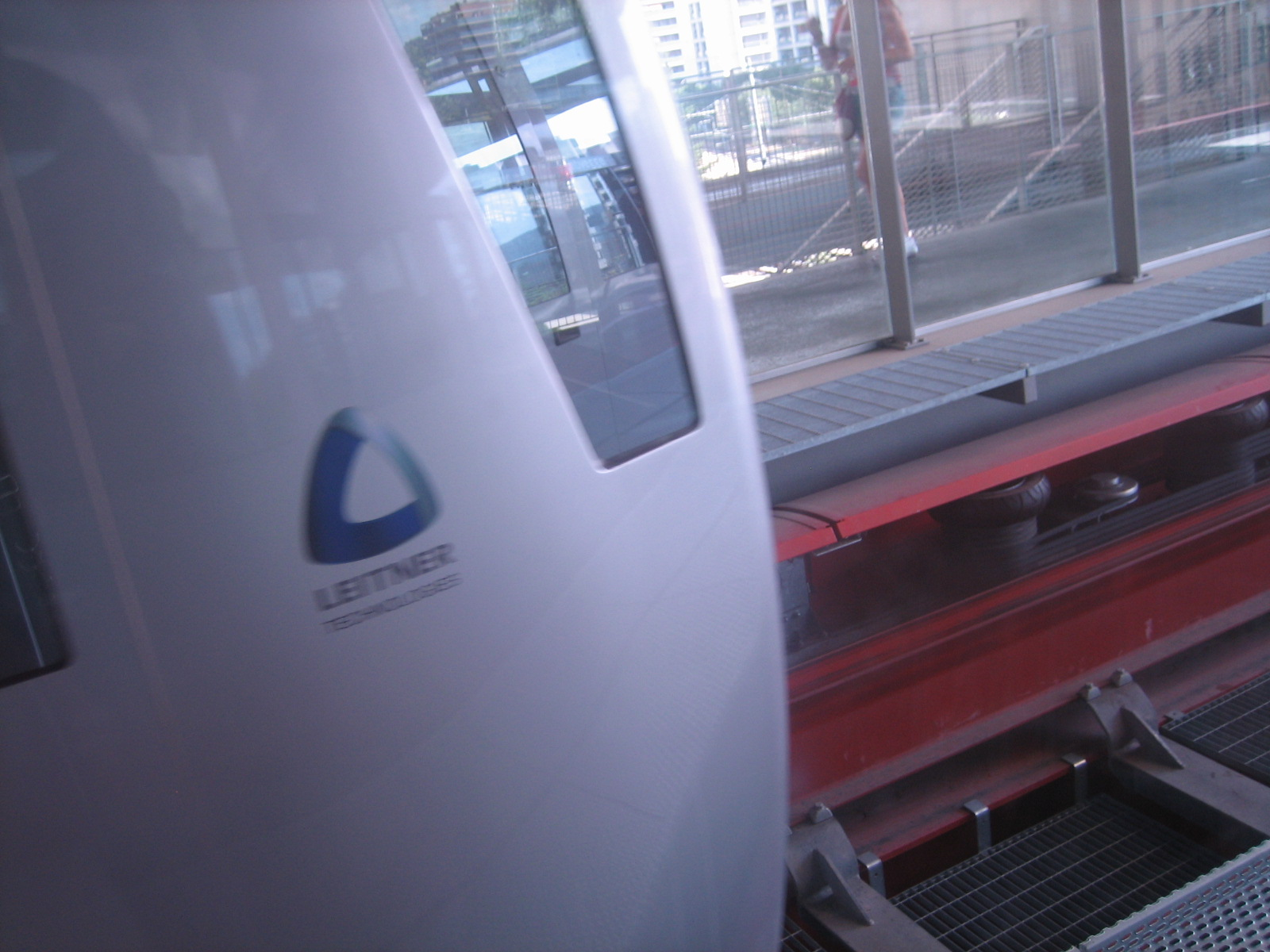
One of the cars of the MiniMetro in Perugia with the Leitner logo

In 1888, Gabriel Leitner established the business, specializing in farm machinery, ropeways for material transportation, waterwheels and sawmills. In 1925, the company grew from a workshop employing 10 employees to a factory to produce agricultural machinery. In 1947, the company build its first chairlift in Corvara, Italy. In 1970, agricultural machinery production ceased and was replaced by snow groomer engineering. In 1980 a production plant was built. In 1983, the company developed a detachable grip for chairlifts and gondola lifts. In 1985, the first detachable gondola lifts were made in Brunico and Valtournenche, Italy. The first 4-seater chair was made in Obereggen, Italy.

In the 1990s, after a period of difficulty that led Michael Seeber to acquire the stake of the two Leitner brothers, nephews of the founder, and to relaunch the company, the first foreign subsidiaries were created.

In 1999, the company acquired the ropeway division of Waagner-Biro.

In 2000 the company took control of the French group Poma (Pomagalski). The technical evolution of cableway systems, with the introduction of detachable grip systems in 1983, opened new possibilities for the development of innovative urban transport systems, such as the Minimetrò of Perugia, an urban cable railway transport system. Also in 2000 its division for snow groomer vehicles merged with the historic Gardena-based company Prinoth, founded by Ernesto Prinoth.

In 2003, a company-wide reorganization resulted in the Leitner Group being formed. In the same year, the Leitwind wind turbine was released. In 2008 the MiniMetro was first built in Perugia, Italy. In 2009, Leitner produced the company's first tricable gondola lift.

On 23 May 2009, the company completed the restoration of, and inaugurated, the Renon cable car.

Since 2011, together with affiliated companies Prinoth and Demaclenko, the Leitner Group has presented itself as the only supplier in the world capable of offering a complete range of winter technologies. In November 2012 Leitner, together with BMW, designed a luxury cabin for the cable car of the Zillertal ski area in Austria. Inside there are leather interiors, cup holders and touch-screen displays.

In 2015 Leitner completed the corporate merger with Agudio, a historic Italian cableway company founded by Tommaso Agudio in 1861. In 2016 leadership passed from Michael to his son Anton, who studied at Bocconi University and had experience in the United States in private equity.

In 2018 the company built around one hundred cableway installations, including the urban cable car in Santo Domingo and the one on the Klein Matterhorn, whose upper station at 4,000 metres is the highest in Europe.

== Sites ==
The company has five sites. The Sterzing site located in Sterzing/Vipiteno, Italy, serves as the headquarters of Leitner AG / SpA. The Sterzing-Unterackern site is also located in Sterzing/Vipiteno, Italy. Leitner GmbH is located at the site in Telfs, Austria. Leitner France SAS is located at the site in Montmélian, France. Leitech s.r.o. is located at the Stará Ľubovňa site in Poprad, Slovakia.
