= Mary Sojourner =

American novelist

Mary Sojourner (born 1940) is an American novelist, NPR commentator, columnist and environmental and social justice activist. She fought for women's mental health rights in Rochester, New York in the 1970s and 1980s, and moved to the Southwest in 1985 where she continued her writing and activism.

== Early life ==
Sojourner grew up in upstate New York. As a child she was an avid reader.

== Writing ==
Sojourner is the author of three novels: Sisters of the Dream, Going Through Ghosts and 29. The latter received a starred review in Booklist. as well as the short story collection Delicate. She has written two memoirs: Solace: Rituals of Loss and Desire and She Bets Her Life;, and a collection of essays, Bonelight: Ruin and Grace in the New Southwest.

She was a Distinguished Writer in Residence for the Virginia Piper Creative Writing program at Arizona State University in 2007 and has served in residencies, including the Bear Lodge Residency at Devil's Tower. She has a monthly writing contest in the Arizona Daily Sun that encourages amateur writers to submit a short piece based on a theme or prompt.

== Radio ==
She has been a national NPR and local NPR commentator since 1999. She reviews Southwestern-themed books for the local NPR station, KNAU.

== Political activism ==
Sojourner has been arrested twice. In the 1980s, she was trying to stop uranium mining in a sacred Havasupai meadow thirteen miles south of the Grand Canyon, and in 2011, she was attempting to stop snow-making with waste water on the San Francisco Peaks (sacred to thirteen Southwestern tribes). Her essay collection, Bonelight, focuses on the environmental and social justice degradation in the New Southwest.

== Personal life ==
She lives in Flagstaff, Arizona.

== Bibliography ==
- Sisters of the Dream: A Novel. Flagstaff, Ariz: Northland Pub, 1989.
- Bonelight: Ruin and Grace in the New Southwest. Reno: University of Nevada Press, 2002
- Solace: Rituals of Loss and Desire. New York: Scribner, 2004
- Delicate: Stories. New York: Scribner, 2004
- Going Through Ghosts: A Novel. Reno: University of Nevada Press, 2010
- She Bets Her Life: A True Story of Gambling Addiction. Berkeley, CA: Seal Press, 2010
- 29. Salt Lake City, Utah : Torrey House Press, 2014
