= Dietlikon =

- Municipality
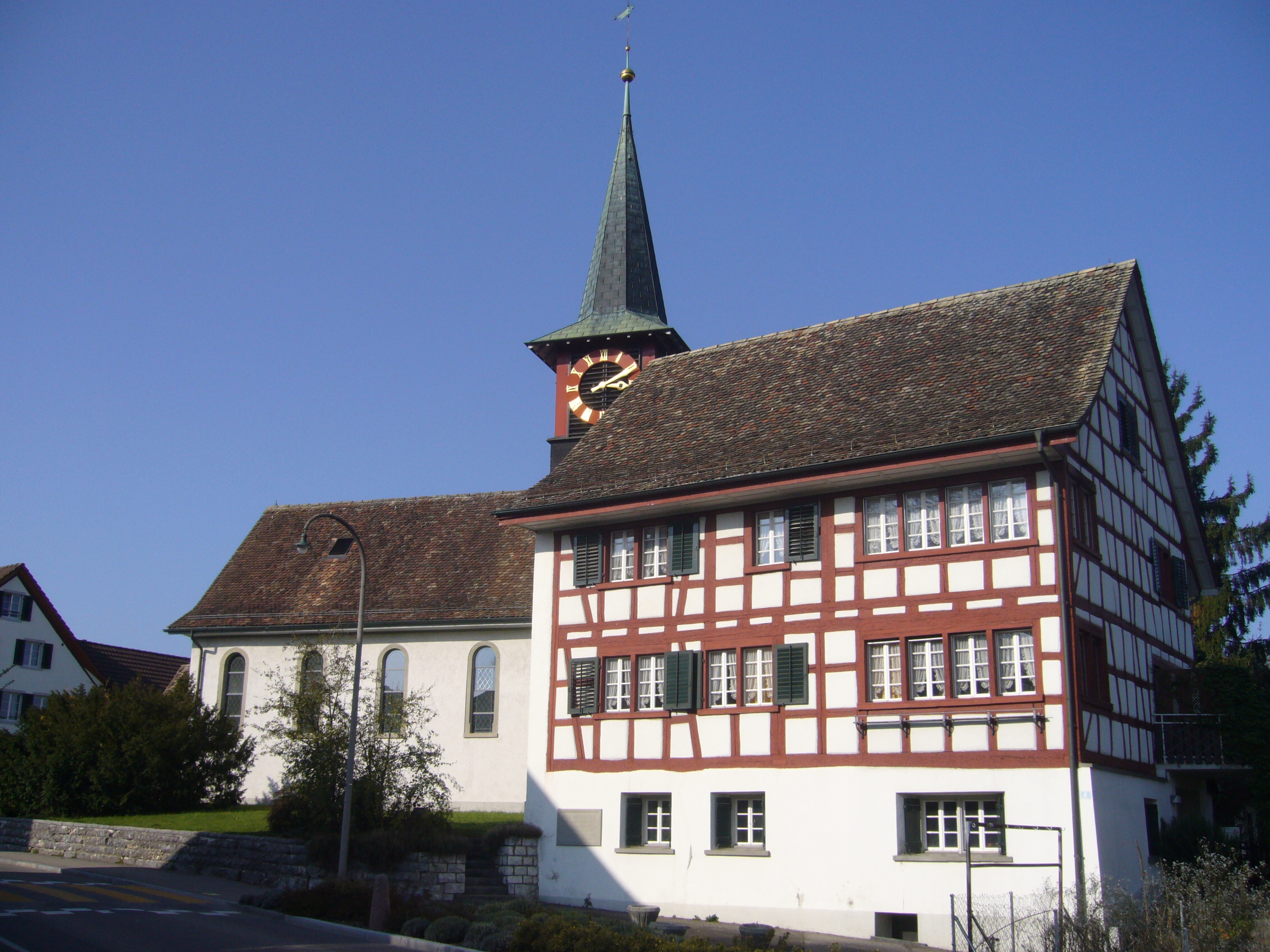

- Flag Coat of arms
- Location of Dietlikon
- Location within Switzerland Location within Canton of Zurich
- Coordinates: 47°25′N 8°37′E
- Country: Switzerland
- Canton: Zurich
- District: Bülach

Area
  - Total: 4.26 km^{2} (1.64 sq mi)
- Elevation: 445 m (1,460 ft)

Population (December 2020)
  - Total: 7,875
  - Density: 1,850/km^{2} (4,790/sq mi)
- Time zone: UTC+01:00 (CET)
  - Summer (DST): UTC+02:00 (CEST)
- Postal code: 8305
- SFOS number: 54
- ISO 3166 code: CH-ZH
- Surrounded by: Bassersdorf, Dübendorf, Kloten, Wallisellen, Wangen-Brüttisellen
- Website: www.dietlikon.ch

Dietlikon is a municipality in the district of Bülach in the canton of Zürich in Switzerland, and belongs to the Glatt Valley (German: Glattal).

== History ==
Aerial view by Walter Mittelholzer (1923)

Dietlikon is first mentioned in 1124 as Dietlinchoven.For a long time, the municipality at the foot of the Hardwald forest led a rather sleepy existence. Dietlikon's foundation can be deduced from its name: Settlements with endings in "-ikon" are of Alemannic origin. The clan leader Dietilo, perhaps also called Dietelo or Dieto ("son of the people"), may have been persuaded to settle in the area of today's old part of the village by the presence of water. The name first appears in 1124 as "Dietlinchoven". Hard work awaited the pioneers. Field names such as Rüti, Rütenen, Brand, Blüttler and Stockwiesen give an idea of how space for meadows and fields was wrested from the forest. Some viticulture was also practiced early on and the rather bitter wine was used together with grain to pay tithes. Dietlikon was owned by the Allerheiligen monastery in Schaffhausen, among others, and the church tax went to Wettingen monastery. Local historiography also mentions Count Adalbert von Mörsburg (around 1100), the Counts of Kyburg and, in connection with the castle and bailiwick of Dübelstein, the Zurich mayor Hans Waldmann.

== Geography ==
Dietlikon has an area of 4.2 km^{2} (1.6 sq mi). Of this area, 23.6% is used for agricultural purposes, while 31.1% is forested. Of the rest of the land, 44.1% is settled (buildings or roads) and the remainder (1.2%) is non-productive (rivers, glaciers or mountains).

The municipality is located on the edge of the middle Glatt Valley.

== Demographics ==
Dietlikon has a population (as of 31 December 2020) of 7,875. As of 2007, 21.8% of the population was made up of foreign nationals. Over the last 10 years the population has grown at a rate of 18%. Most of the population (as of 2000) speaks German (83.7%), with Italian being second most common (5.2%) and Serbo-Croatian being third (2.0%).

In the 2007 election the most popular party was the SVP which received 36.4% of the vote. The next three most popular parties were the SPS (20.8%), the FDP (13.8%) and the CSP (9.7%).

The age distribution of the population (as of 2000) is children and teenagers (0–19 years old) make up 20.5% of the population, while adults (20–64 years old) make up 65.3% and seniors (over 64 years old) make up 14.2%. In Dietlikon about 75.9% of the population (between age 25-64) have completed either non-mandatory upper secondary education or additional higher education (either university or a Fachhochschule).

Dietlikon has an unemployment rate of 3.09%. As of 2005, there were 27 people employed in the primary economic sector and about 8 businesses involved in this sector. 1379 people are employed in the secondary sector and there are 73 businesses in this sector. 4278 people are employed in the tertiary sector, with 303 businesses in this sector. The historical population is given in the following table:

year	population
1467	c. 115
1634	137
1771	482
1880	386
1900	565
1950	1,205
1970	4,381
2000	6,281
2022	7,855

== Transportation ==
Dietlikon railway station is a stop of the Zürich S-Bahn on the lines S3, S8 and S19.
