= Poland at the 1992 Winter Olympics =

- IOC code: POL
- NOC: Polish Olympic Committee
- Website: www.pkol.pl (in Polish)

in Albertville
- Competitors: 53 (41 men, 12 women) in 9 sports
- Flag bearer: Henryk Gruth (ice hockey)
- Medals: Gold 0 Silver 0 Bronze 0 Total 0

Winter Olympics appearances (overview)
- 1924; 1928; 1932; 1936; 1948; 1952; 1956; 1960; 1964; 1968; 1972; 1976; 1980; 1984; 1988; 1992; 1994; 1998; 2002; 2006; 2010; 2014; 2018; 2022; 2026

Poland was represented at the 1992 Winter Olympics in Albertville, France by the Polish Olympic Committee.

In total, 53 athletes including 41 men and 12 women represented Poland in nine different sports including alpine skiing, biathlon, cross-country skiing, figure skating, ice hockey, luge, Nordic combined, ski jumping and speed skating.

== Competitors ==
In total, 53 athletes represented Poland at the 1992 Winter Olympics in Albertville, France across nine different sports.

Sport	Men	Women	Total
Alpine skiing	2	1	3
Biathlon	5	4	9
Cross-country skiing	2	5	7
Figure skating	1	1	2
Ice hockey	23	–	23
Luge	2	0	2
Nordic combined	2	–	2
Ski jumping	1	–	1
Speed skating	3	1	4
Total	41	12	53

== Alpine skiing ==
In total, three Polish athletes participated in the alpine skiing events – Jakub Malczewski, Marcin Szafrański and Ewa Zagata.

Men

Athlete	Event	Race 1	Race 2	Race 3	Total	
Athlete	Event	Time	Time	Time	Time	Rank
Jakub Malczewski	Men's super-G				DNF	–
Jakub Malczewski	Men's giant slalom	1:15.86	1:14.81		2:30.67	52
Jakub Malczewski	Men's slalom	1:00.59	DNF		DNF	–
Marcin Szafrański	Men's super-G				DNF	–
Marcin Szafrański	Men's giant slalom	1:15.06	1:12.34		2:27.40	46
Marcin Szafrański	Men's slalom	DNF	–		DNF	–
Marcin Szafrański	Men's combined	1:50.60	56.55	57.90	133.04	26

Women

Athlete	Event	Race 1	Race 2	Total	
Athlete	Event	Time	Time	Time	Rank
Ewa Zagata	Women's giant slalom	1:14.56	1:14.86	2:29.42	29
Ewa Zagata	Women's slalom	DNF	–	DNF	–

== Biathlon ==
In total, nine Polish athletes participated in the biathlon events – Zbigniew Filip, Zofia Kiełpińska, Dariusz Kozłowski, Krystyna Liberda, Halina Pitoń, Krzysztof Sosna, Agata Suszka, Jan Wojtas abd Jan Ziemianin.

Men

Athlete	Event	Time	Misses	Rank
Zbigniew Filip	Sprint	27:23.7	1	16
Zbigniew Filip	Individual	1'06:40.9	7	72
Dariusz Kozłowski	Individual	1'04:17.2	4	58
Krzysztof Sosna	Sprint	28:37.4	3	46
Krzysztof Sosna	Individual	1'04:24.1	7	60
Jan Wojtas	Sprint	28:56.5	2	56
Jan Ziemianin	Sprint	27:47.2	1	29
Jan Ziemianin	Individual	1'01:44.7	4	32
Dariusz Kozłowski; Jan Ziemianin; Jan Wojtas; Krzysztof Sosna	Team relay	1'27:56.7	0	9

Women

Athlete	Event	Time	Misses	Rank
Zofia Kiełpińska	Sprint	28:39.7	4	50
Zofia Kiełpińska	Individual	1'03:15.1	11	62
Krystyna Liberda	Sprint	29:39.9	7	60
Krystyna Liberda	Individual	1'02:57.2	8	59
Halina Pitoń	Sprint	28:11.7	4	40
Halina Pitoń	Individual	56:07.2	4	20
Agata Suszka	Sprint	28:23.6	3	46
Agata Suszka	Individual	59:30.2	6	46
Agata Suszka; Zofia Kiełpińska; Halina Pitoń	Team relay	1'24:07.5	4	14

== Cross-country skiing ==
In total, seven Polish athletes participated in the cross-country skiing events – Bernadetta Bocek-Piotrowska, Wiesław Cempa, Dorota Kwaśny, Halina Nowak-Guńka, Andrzej Piotrowski, Katarzyna Popieluch and Małgorzata Ruchała.

Men

Athlete	Event	Classical		Freestyle		Final	
Athlete	Event	Time	Rank	Time	Rank	Time	Rank
Wiesław Cempa	10 km classical	—N/a				32:13.9	63
Wiesław Cempa	Pursuit	32:13.9	63	40:16.2	40	1:12:29.2	48
Wiesław Cempa	30 km classical	—N/a				1:32:25.4	52
Wiesław Cempa	50 km freestyle	—N/a				2:15:06.7	32
Andrzej Piotrowski	10 km classical	—N/a				31:56.9	57
Andrzej Piotrowski	Pursuit	31:56.9	57	40:32.9	42	1:12:28.9	47
Andrzej Piotrowski	30 km classical	—N/a				1:34:32.9	61
Andrzej Piotrowski	50 km freestyle	—N/a				2:20:32.9	48

Women

Athlete	Event	Classical		Freestyle		Final	
Athlete	Event	Time	Rank	Time	Rank	Time	Rank
Bernadetta Bocek-Piotrowska	5 km classical	—N/a				15:47.4	36
Bernadetta Bocek-Piotrowska	Pursuit	15:47.4	36	27:41.3	20	43:28.3	27
Bernadetta Bocek-Piotrowska	15 km classical	—N/a				46:18.6	24
Bernadetta Bocek-Piotrowska	30 km freestyle	—N/a				1:31:44.3	23
Dorota Kwaśny	5 km classical	—N/a				15:16.5	24
Dorota Kwaśny	Pursuit	15:16.5	24	27:52.7	22	43:08.7	21
Dorota Kwaśny	15 km classical	—N/a				47:44.4	35
Halina Nowak-Guńka	5 km classical	—N/a				16:56.1	55
Halina Nowak-Guńka	Pursuit	16:56.1	55	28:36.4	35	45:32.4	44
Halina Nowak-Guńka	30 km freestyle	—N/a				1:31:56.2	25
Katarzyna Popieluch	15 km classical	—N/a				48:45.3	38
Katarzyna Popieluch	30 km freestyle	—N/a				DNF	
Małgorzata Ruchała	5 km classical	—N/a				15:57.9	40
Małgorzata Ruchała	Pursuit	15:57.9	40	DNS		DNF	
Małgorzata Ruchała	15 km classical	—N/a				47:36.3	14
Małgorzata Ruchała	30 km freestyle	—N/a				1:31:47.6	24
Małgorzata Ruchała; Dorota Kwaśny; Bernadetta Bocek-Piotrowska; Halina Nowak-Guńka	Team relay	—N/a				1:03:23.0	10

== Figure skating ==
In total, two Polish athletes participated in the figure skating events – Grzegorz Filipowski and Zuzanna Szwed.

Athlete	Event	SP	FS	TFP	Rank
Grzegorz Filipowski	Men's	13	10	13.5	11
Zuzanna Szwed	Ladies	23	19	30.5	19

== Ice hockey ==
In total, 23 Polish athletes participated in the ice hockey events – Janusz Adamiec, Marek Batkiewicz, Krzystof Bujar, Marek Cholewa, Mariusz Czerkawski, Dariusz Garbocz, Henryk Gruth, Kazimierz Jurek, Andrzej Kadziolka, Mariusz Kieca, Waldemar Klisiak, Krzystof Kuzniecow, Dariusz Platek, Mariusz Puzio, Janusz Rajnos, Gabriel Samolej, Jerzy Sobera, Rafal Sroka, Andrzej Swistak, Robert Szopinski, Wojciech Tkacz, Mirosław Tomasik and Slawomir Wieloch.

=== Group A ===
Twelve participating teams were placed in two groups. After playing a round-robin, the top four teams in each group advanced to the medal round while the last two teams competed in the consolation round for the 9th to 12th places.

Team advanced to the Final Round
Team sent to compete in the Consolation round

Team	GP	W	L	T	GF	GA	DIF	PTS
United States	5	4	0	1	18	7	11	9
Sweden	5	3	0	2	22	11	11	8
Finland	5	3	1	1	22	11	11	7
Germany	5	2	3	0	11	12	-1	4
Italy	5	1	4	0	18	24	-6	2
Poland	5	0	5	0	4	30	-26	0

Sweden	7:2	Poland
Finland	9:1	Poland
Italy	7:1	Poland
United States	3:0	Poland
Germany	4:0	Poland

=== Consolation round 9th-12th places ===
Switzerland	7:2	Poland

11th-place match

Poland 11th	4:1	Italy

== Luge ==
In total, two Polish athletes participated in the luge events – Leszek Szarejko and Adrian Przechewka.

Athletes	Event	Run 1		Run 2		Total	
Athletes	Event	Time	Rank	Time	Rank	Time	Rank
Leszek Szarejko; Adrian Przechewka	Doubles	47.127	15	1:07.927	20	1:55.054	20

== Nordic combined ==
In total, two Polish athletes participated in the Nordic combined events – Stefan Habas and Stanisław Ustupski.

Men's individual

Events:

- normal hill ski jumping (Best two out of three jumps.)
- 15 km cross-country skiing (Start delay, based on ski jumping results.)

Athlete	Event	Ski Jumping		Cross-country		Total
Athlete	Event	Points	Rank	Start at	Time	Rank
Stefan Habas	Individual	191.8	33	+4:04.7	50:18.1	25
Stanisław Ustupski	Individual	202.6	18	+2:52.7	46:56.2	8

== Ski jumping ==
In total, one Polish athlete participated in the ski jumping events – Zbigniew Klimowski.

Athlete	Event	Jump 1		Jump 2		Total	
Athlete	Event	Distance	Points	Distance	Points	Points	Rank
Zbigniew Klimowski	Large hill	87.5	55.0	91.0	62.9	117.9	49

== Speed skating ==
In total, four Polish athletes participated in the speed skating events – Paweł Abratkiewicz, Paweł Jaroszek, Jaromir Radke and Ewa Wasilewska.

Men

Athlete	Event	Final	
Athlete	Event	Time	Rank
Paweł Abratkiewicz	500 m	38.74	31
Paweł Abratkiewicz	1000 m	1:17.40	28
Paweł Jaroszek	1000 m	1:17.82	32
Paweł Jaroszek	1500 m	1:57.80	16
Jaromir Radke	5000 m	7:18.40	16
Jaromir Radke	10000 m	14:42.60	14

Women

Athlete	Event	Final	
Athlete	Event	Time	Rank
Ewa Wasilewska	1000 m	1:24.28	18
Ewa Wasilewska	1500 m	2:09.64	14
Ewa Wasilewska	3000 m	4:44.56	24
