= Poland at the 1994 Winter Olympics =

- IOC code: POL
- NOC: Polish Olympic Committee
- Website: www.pkol.pl (in Polish)

in Lillehammer
- Competitors: 28 (15 men, 13 women) in 8 sports
- Flag bearer: Tomasz Sikora (biathlon)
- Medals: Gold 0 Silver 0 Bronze 0 Total 0

Winter Olympics appearances (overview)
- 1924; 1928; 1932; 1936; 1948; 1952; 1956; 1960; 1964; 1968; 1972; 1976; 1980; 1984; 1988; 1992; 1994; 1998; 2002; 2006; 2010; 2014; 2018; 2022; 2026

Poland was represented at the 1994 Winter Olympics in Lillehammer, Norway by the Polish Olympic Committee.

In total, 28 athletes including 15 men and 13 women represented Poland in eight different sports including alpine skiing, biathlon, cross-country skiing, figure skating, luge, Nordic combined, ski jumping and speed skating. No athletes won medals but five top-10 finishes were achieved.

== Competitors ==
In total, 28 athletes represented Poland at the 1998 Winter Olympics in Lillehammer, Norway across eight different sports.

Sport	Men	Women	Total
Alpine skiing	1	0	1
Biathlon	5	5	10
Cross-country skiing	0	5	5
Figure skating	1	2	3
Luge	2	0	2
Nordic combined	1	–	1
Ski jumping	1	–	1
Speed skating	4	1	5
Total	15	13	28

== Alpine skiing ==
One Polish athlete participated in the alpine skiing events – Marcin Szafrański.

Men

Athlete	Event	Race 1	Race 2	Total	
Athlete	Event	Time	Time	Time	Rank
Marcin Szafrański	Downhill			1:52.59	46
Marcin Szafrański	Super-G			1:38.54	42
Marcin Szafrański	Slalom	DNF	–	DNF	–

Men's combined

Athlete	Event	Downhill	Slalom		Total	
Athlete	Event	Time	Time 1	Time 2	Total time	Rank
Marcin Szafrański	Combined	1:43.82	54.95	52.50	3:31.27	27

== Biathlon ==
In total, 10 Polish athletes participated in the biathlon events – Zofia Kiełpińska, Helena Mikołajczyk, Halina Pitoń, Tomasz Sikora, Anna Stera-Kustucz, Agata Suszka, Krzysztof Topór, Jan Wojtas, Jan Ziemianin and Wiesław Ziemianin.

Men

Athlete	Event	Time	Misses	Rank
Tomasz Sikora	Sprint	31:02.6	3	32
Krzysztof Topór	Sprint	32:37.7	3	61
Jan Wojtas	Individual	1:08:10.5	7	67
Jan Ziemianin	Sprint	30:44.2	2	27
Jan Ziemianin	Individual	1:02:00.6	4	39
Wiesław Ziemianin	Individual	1:05:48.8	6	63
Tomasz Sikora; Jan Ziemianin; Wiesław Ziemianin; Jan Wojtas	Team relay	1:33:49.3	0	8

Women

Athlete	Event	Time	Misses	Rank
Zofia Kiełpińska	Sprint	31:11.1	7	68
Helena Mikołajczyk	Individual	59:44.8	7	52
Halina Pitoń	Sprint	29:39.2	4	57
Halina Pitoń	Individual	1:00:18.2	7	57
Anna Stera-Kustucz	Sprint	30:04.5	3	62
Agata Suszka	Individual	59:13.2	4	45
Anna Stera-Kustucz; Helena Mikołajczyk; Agata Suszka; Halina Pitoń	Team relay	1:59:18.1	4	11

== Cross-country skiing ==
Five Polish athletes participated in the cross-country skiing events – Bernadetta Bocek-Piotrowska, Dorota Kwaśny, Michalina Maciuszek, Halina Nowak-Guńka and Małgorzata Ruchała.

Women

Athlete	Event	Classical		Freestyle		Final	
Athlete	Event	Time	Rank	Time	Rank	Time	Rank
Bernadetta Bocek-Piotrowska	5 km classical					15:47.1	31
Bernadetta Bocek-Piotrowska	Pursuit	15:47.1	31	29:11.2	19	44:58.3	22
Bernadetta Bocek-Piotrowska	15 km freestyle					44:12.8	18
Bernadetta Bocek-Piotrowska	30 km classical					1:34:28.6	34
Dorota Kwaśny	5 km classical					16:04.3	38
Dorota Kwaśny	Pursuit	16:04.3	38	29:57.6	26	46:01.9	28
Dorota Kwaśny	15 km freestyle					44:43.1	22
Dorota Kwaśny	30 km classical					DNF	
Michalina Maciuszek	15 km freestyle					46:43.0	40
Michalina Maciuszek	30 km classical					1:33:34.2	31
Halina Nowak-Guńka	5 km classical					16:46.1	58
Halina Nowak-Guńka	15 km freestyle					45:02.2	25
Małgorzata Ruchała	5 km classical					15:07.5	15
Małgorzata Ruchała	Pursuit	15:07.5	15	28:50.7	15	43:58.2	14
Małgorzata Ruchała	30 km classical					1:30:45.8	16
Michalina Maciuszek; Małgorzata Ruchała; Dorota Kwaśny; Bernadetta Bocek-Piotrowska	Team relay					1:01:13.2	8

^{2} Starting delay based on 5 km results.
C = Classical style, F = Freestyle

== Figure skating ==
Three Polish athletes participated in the figure skating events – Agnieszka Domańska, Marcin Głowacki and Anna Rechnio.

Athlete	Event	CD1	CD2	SP/OD	FS/FD	TFP	Rank
Anna Rechnio	Ladies			9	12	16.5	10
Agnieszka Domańska; Marcin Głowacki	Ice dance	18	18	18	17	35.0	17

== Luge ==
Two Polish athletes participated in the luge events – Adrian Przechewka and Leszek Szarejko.

Athletes	Event	Run 1		Run 2		Total	
Athletes	Event	Time	Rank	Time	Rank	Time	Rank
Leszek Szarejko; Adrian Przechewka	Doubles	49.104	14	49.800	18	1:38.904	16

== Nordic combined ==
One Polish athlete participated in the Nordic combined events – Stanisław Ustupski.

Events:

- normal hill ski jumping
- 15 km cross-country skiing (Start delay, based on ski jumping results.)

Athlete	Event	Ski Jumping		Cross-country		Total
Athlete	Event	Points	Rank	Start at	Time	Rank
Stanisław Ustupski	Individual	200.0	19	+5:13.0	46:06.8	21

== Ski jumping ==
One Polish athlete participated in the ski jumping events – Wojciech Skupień.

Athlete	Event	Jump 1		Jump 2		Total	
Athlete	Event	Distance	Points	Distance	Points	Points	Rank
Wojciech Skupień	Men's normal hill	84.5	100.5	86.5	106.0	206.5	29
Wojciech Skupień	Men's large hill	94.5	65.1	100.0	76.5	141.6	31

== Speed skating ==
Five Polish athletes participated in the speed skating events – Paweł Jaroszek, Jaromir Radke, Artur Szafrański and Paweł Zygmunt.

Men

Athlete	Event	Final	
Athlete	Event	Time	Rank
Paweł Jaroszek	1500 m	1:54.49	11
Jaromir Radke	5000 m	6:50.40	7
Jaromir Radke	10000 m	14:03.84	5
Artur Szafrański	1500 m	DNF	
Paweł Zygmunt	1500 m	2:05.21	40
Paweł Zygmunt	5000 m	6:58.91	18

Women

Athlete	Event	Final	
Athlete	Event	Time	Rank
Ewa Wasilewska	1500 m	2:07.44	18
Ewa Wasilewska	3000 m	4:28.86	16
