= Poland at the 1998 Winter Olympics =

- IOC code: POL
- NOC: Polish Olympic Committee
- Website: www.pkol.pl (in Polish)

in Nagano
- Competitors: 39 (24 men, 15 women) in 10 sports
- Flag bearer: Jan Ziemianin (biathlon)
- Medals: Gold 0 Silver 0 Bronze 0 Total 0

Winter Olympics appearances (overview)
- 1924; 1928; 1932; 1936; 1948; 1952; 1956; 1960; 1964; 1968; 1972; 1976; 1980; 1984; 1988; 1992; 1994; 1998; 2002; 2006; 2010; 2014; 2018; 2022; 2026

Poland competed at the 1998 Winter Olympics in Nagano, Japan.

== Competitors ==
The following is the list of number of competitors in the Games.

Sport	Men	Women	Total
Alpine skiing	1	0	1
Biathlon	4	5	9
Bobsleigh	4	–	4
Cross-country skiing	1	5	6
Figure skating	2	3	5
Luge	2	0	2
Short track speed skating	1	0	1
Ski jumping	5	–	5
Snowboarding	1	2	3
Speed skating	3	0	3
Total	24	15	39

== Alpine skiing ==
Men

Athlete	Event	Race 1	Race 2	Total	
Athlete	Event	Time	Time	Time	Rank
Andrzej Bachleda	Downhill			1:53.62	22
Andrzej Bachleda	Giant slalom	1:24.17	1:22.07	2:46.24	24
Andrzej Bachleda	Slalom	57.45	DNF	DNF	

Men's combined

Athlete	Event	Downhill	Slalom		Total	
Athlete	Event	Time	Time 1	Time 2	Total time	Rank
Andrzej Bachleda	Combined	49.02	45.47	1:37.04	3:11.53	5

== Biathlon ==
Men

Athlete	Event	Time	Misses	Rank
Wojciech Kozub	Sprint	29:28.5	3	23
Wojciech Kozub	Individual	1:00:41.1	4	30
Tomasz Sikora	Sprint	29:40.8	1	28
Tomasz Sikora	Individual	1:02:39.9	5	47
Wiesław Ziemianin	Sprint	29:34.4	1	26
Wiesław Ziemianin	Individual	1:02:39.9	4	47
Wiesław Ziemianin; Tomasz Sikora; Jan Ziemianin; Wojciech Kozub	Team relay	1:24:09.8	0	5

Women

Athlete	Event	Time	Misses	Rank
Halina Nowak-Guńka	Sprint	25:39.0	5	42
Halina Pitoń	Individual	1:02:45.0	6	42
Anna Stera-Kustucz	Sprint	23:53.1	2	6
Anna Stera-Kustucz	Individual	57:56.0	2	17
Agata Suszka	Sprint	25:45.1	3	45
Agata Suszka	Individual	1:01:35.4	6	42
Agata Suszka; Halina Pitoń; Iwona Daniluk; Anna Stera-Kustucz	Team relay	1:45:45.5	2	13

== Bobsleigh ==
Sled	Athletes	Event	Run 1		Run 2		Run 3		Total	
Sled	Athletes	Event	Time	Rank	Time	Rank	Time	Rank	Time	Rank
POL-1	Tomasz Żyła; Dawid Kupczyk; Krzysztof Sieńko; Tomasz Gatka	Four-man	54.71	22	54.45	21	54.63	19	2:43.79	22

== Cross-country skiing ==
Men

Athlete	Event	Classical		Freestyle		Final	
Athlete	Event	Time	Rank	Time	Rank	Time	Rank
Janusz Krężelok	10 km classical					32:02.8	76
Janusz Krężelok	Pursuit	32:02.8	76	42:34.5	50	1:14:37.3	53
Janusz Krężelok	50 km freestyle					2:19:04.4	40

Women

Athlete	Event	Classical		Freestyle		Final	
Athlete	Event	Time	Rank	Time	Rank	Time	Rank
Bernadetta Bocek-Piotrowska	5 km classical					19:17.3	39
Bernadetta Bocek-Piotrowska	Pursuit	19:17.3	39	31:10.9	47	50:27.9	43
Bernadetta Bocek-Piotrowska	15 km classical					51:40.7	33
Bernadetta Bocek-Piotrowska	30 km freestyle					1:32:37.6	33
Katarzyna Gębala	15 km classical					19:58.8	60
Katarzyna Gębala	Pursuit	19:58.8	60	32:43.3	61	52:41.3	59
Dorota Kwaśny	5 km classical					20:03.1	61
Dorota Kwaśny	Pursuit	20:03.1	61	31:12.6	48	51:15.6	49
Dorota Kwaśny	15 km classical					53:42.6	50
Dorota Kwaśny	30 km freestyle					DNF	
Małgorzata Ruchała	5 km classical					19:06.4	33
Małgorzata Ruchała	Pursuit	19:06.4	33	30:46.2	41	49:52.2	35
Eliza Surdyka	15 km classical					55:37.5	58
Katarzyna Gębala; Małgorzata Ruchała; Dorota Kwaśny; Bernadetta Bocek-Piotrowska	Team relay					59:56.7	13

^{2} Starting delay based on 5 km results.
C = Classical style, F = Freestyle

== Figure skating ==
Athlete	Event	CD1	CD2	SP/OD	FS/FD	TFP	Rank
Anna Rechnio	Ladies			13	20	26.5	19
Dorota Zagorska; Mariusz Siudek	Pair skating			10	11	16.0	10
Sylwia Nowak; Sebastian Kolasiński	Ice dance	12	12	11	12	23.4	12

== Luge ==
Athletes	Event	Run 1		Run 2		Total	
Athletes	Event	Time	Rank	Time	Rank	Time	Rank
Piotr Orslowski; Robert Mieszała	Doubles	52.062	15	51.445	13	1:43.507	15

== Short track speed skating ==
Men

Athlete	Event	Round one		Quarter finals		Semi finals		Finals	
Athlete	Event	Time	Rank	Time	Rank	Time	Rank	Time	Final rank
Maciej Pryczek	Men's 500 metres	46.652	3	did not advance					
Maciej Pryczek	Men's 1000 metres	1:33.555	4	did not advance					

== Ski jumping ==
Athlete	Event	Jump 1			Jump 2		Total	
Athlete	Event	Distance	Points	Rank	Distance	Points	Points	Rank
Krystian Długopolski	Men's normal hill	61.0	45.0	62	did not advance			
Łukasz Paweł Kruczek	Men's large hill	102.0	81.6	45	did not advance			
Adam Małysz	Men's normal hill	69.5	70.5	51	did not advance			
Adam Małysz	Men's large hill	97.0	71.1	52	did not advance			
Robert Mateja	Men's normal hill	81.5	98.0	21 Q	82.0	99.5	197.5	21
Robert Mateja	Men's large hill	116.5	107.7	19 Q	118.0	111.9	219.6	20
Wojciech Skupień	Men's normal hill	76.0	85.0	32	did not advance			
Wojciech Skupień	Men's large hill	117.0	111.1	12 Q	125.5	126.4	237.5	11
Adam Małysz; Łukasz Paweł Kruczek; Wojciech Skupień; Robert Mateja	Men's large team	95.2; 87.4; 44.5; 99.6	326.7	7	108.5; 78.4; 90.6; 93.7	371.2	684.2	8

== Snowboarding ==
Slalom

Athlete	Event	Race 1	Race 2	Total	
Athlete	Event	Time	Time	Time	Rank
Jagna Marczułajtis	Women's giant slalom	DNF	DNS	DNF	
Małgorzata Rosiak	Women's giant slalom	1:19.41	1:22.16	2:41.57	19
Łukasz Starowicz	Men's giant slalom	1:03.50	1:08.81	2:12.31	19

Halfpipe

Athlete	Event	Qualifying round 1		Qualifying round 2		Final	
Athlete	Event	Points	Rank	Points	Rank	Points	Rank
Łukasz Starowicz	Men's halfpipe	27.2	34	26.5	27	did not advance	

== Speed skating ==
Men

Athlete	Event	Race 1		Race 2		Total	
Athlete	Event	Time	Rank	Time	Rank	Time	Rank
Paweł Abratkiewicz	500 metres	36.76	24	36.51	20	73.27	22
Paweł Abratkiewicz	1000 metres					1:12.80	26
Tomasz Świst	500 metres	36.86	28	36.68	25	73.54	26
Tomasz Świst	1000 metres					1:15.55	41
Paweł Zygmunt	1500 metres					1:53.73	34
Paweł Zygmunt	5000 metres					6:45.59	18
