= Czechoslovakia at the 1992 Winter Olympics =

- IOC code: TCH
- NOC: Czechoslovak Olympic Committee

in Albertville
- Competitors: 74 (55 men, 19 women) in 10 sports
- Flag bearer: Pavel Benc (cross-country skiing)
- Medals Ranked 18th: Gold 0 Silver 0 Bronze 3 Total 3

Winter Olympics appearances (overview)
- 1924; 1928; 1932; 1936; 1948; 1952; 1956; 1960; 1964; 1968; 1972; 1976; 1980; 1984; 1988; 1992

Other related appearances
- Czech Republic (1994–pres.); Slovakia (1994–pres.)

Czechoslovakia, formally the Czech and Slovak Federative Republic, competed at the 1992 Winter Olympics in Albertville, France. The team consisted of 74 athletes, which was the largest number at that time. It was the last time Czechoslovakia participated in the Winter Olympics, because the state split to Czech Republic and Slovakia and both countries entered their independent teams to the 1994 Winter Olympics.

Cross-country skier Pavel Benc was the flag-bearer of the country in the opening ceremony.

== Medalists ==
Medal	Name	Sport	Event	Date
Bronze	Tomáš Goder; František Jež; Jaroslav Sakala; Jiří Parma	Ski jumping	Large hill team	14 February
Bronze	Petr Barna	Figure skating	Men's singles	15 February
Bronze	Czechoslovakia men's national ice hockey team: Patrik Augusta; Petr Bříza; Leo Gudas; Miloslav Hořava; Petr Hrbek; Otakar Janecký; Tomáš Jelínek; Richard Žemlička; Drahomír Kadlec; Kamil Kašťák; Robert Lang; Igor Liba; Ladislav Lubina; František Procházka; Petr Rosol; Bedřich Ščerban; Jiří Šlégr; Richard Šmehlík; Róbert Švehla; Oldřich Svoboda; Radek Ťoupal; Peter Veselovský	Ice hockey	Men's tournament	22 February

== Competitors ==
The following is the list of number of competitors in the Games.

Sport	Men	Women	Total
Alpine skiing	2	2	4
Biathlon	4	6	10
Bobsleigh	6	–	6
Cross-country skiing	6	6	12
Figure skating	3	3	6
Ice hockey	22	–	22
Luge	2	2	4
Nordic combined	4	–	4
Ski jumping	4	–	4
Speed skating	2	0	2
Total	55	19	74

== Alpine skiing ==
Czechoslovakia's participation in the alpine skiing races was done by four skiers, all Slovaks. Lucia Medzihradská was the most successful of them reaching top eight in the women's combined event.

Men

Athlete	Event	Run 1		Run 2		Final/Total		
Athlete	Event	Time	Rank	Time	Rank	Time	Diff	Rank
Marian Bíreš	Downhill	—N/a				1:56.21	+5.84	34
Marian Bíreš	Super-G	—N/a				1:17.47	+4.43	37
Marian Bíreš	Giant slalom	1:10.98	43	1:07.13	31	2:18.11	+11.13	34
Marian Bíreš	Slalom	56.01	31	Did not finish				
Peter Jurko	Super-G	—N/a				1:17.68	+4.64	39
Peter Jurko	Giant slalom	1:10.65	39	1:08.50	38	2:19.15	+12.17	37
Peter Jurko	Slalom	55.95	30	56.85	30	1:52.80	+8.41	25

Men's combined

Athlete	Event	Downhill			Slalom					Total	
Athlete	Event	Time	Points	Rank	Time 1	Time 2	Total	Points	Rank	Points	Rank
Marian Bíreš	Combined	1:49.61	47.30	37	Did not finish						
Peter Jurko	Combined	1:58.27	135.57	52	Did not finish						

Women

Athlete	Event	Run 1		Run 2		Final/Total		
Athlete	Event	Time	Rank	Time	Rank	Time	Diff	Rank
Lucia Medzihradská	Downhill	—N/a				1:54.78	+2.23	16
Lucia Medzihradská	Super-G	—N/a				1:26.76	+5.54	27
Lucia Medzihradská	Giant slalom	1:09.90	27	1:09.37	19	2:19.27	+6.53	20
Lucia Medzihradská	Slalom	50.08	19	46.37	17	1:36.45	+3.77	16
Ľudmila Milanová	Downhill	—N/a				1:57.85	+5.30	24
Ľudmila Milanová	Super-G	—N/a				1:27.61	+6.39	34
Ľudmila Milanová	Giant slalom	Did not finish						
Ľudmila Milanová	Slalom	51.95	30	47.83	23	1:39.78	+7.10	24

Women's combined

Athlete	Event	Downhill			Slalom					Total	
Athlete	Event	Time	Points	Rank	Time 1	Time 2	Total	Points	Rank	Points	Rank
Lucia Medzihradská	Combined	1:27.89	25.55	16	35.52	36.43	1:11.95	21.88	9	47.43	8
Ľudmila Milanová	Combined	1:28.68	35.40	22	36.69	37.57	1:14.26	40.88	12	76.28	15

== Biathlon ==
Jiřina Adamičková was close to winning a medal in the women's sprint, fighting for it after last shooting, but fading fast in the closing uphill section and falling down to fifth place, seven seconds behind bronze-medal Belova of the Unified Team.

Men

Athlete	Event	Final		
Athlete	Event	Time	Misses	Rank
Jiří Holubec	Individual	59:56.2	0	15
Jiří Holubec	Sprint	27:37.8	0	23
Tomáš Kos	Individual	1:00:33.3	2	23
Tomáš Kos	Sprint	27:37.4	1	22
Ivan Masařík	Individual	1:05:24.9	7	66
Ivan Masařík	Sprint	27:16.8	2	12
Martin Rypl	Individual	1:00:39.3	3	25
Martin Rypl	Sprint	28:41.8	1	50
Martin Rypl; Tomáš Kos; Jiří Holubec; Ivan Masařík	Relay	1:27:15.8	1	7

Women

Athlete	Event	Final		
Athlete	Event	Time	Misses	Rank
Jiřina Adamičková	Individual	56:21.8	3	23
Jiřina Adamičková	Sprint	24:57.6	0	5
Gabriela Sůvová	Individual	1:02:22.4	7	56
Gabriela Sůvová	Sprint	26:42.1	2	18
Jana Kulhavá	Individual	59:09.8	6	43
Petra Nosková	Individual	1:02:57:6	7	60
Helena Černohorská	Sprint	30:13.8	3	62
Iveta Knížková	Sprint	28:13.0	8	41
Gabriela Sůvová; Jana Kulhavá; Jiřina Adamičková	Relay	1:23:12.7	3	8

== Bobsleigh ==
After many years, Czechoslovakia entered its Olympic bobsleigh teams again, which recorded average to below-average results, but improved fast to be strong competitors at the 1994 Winter Olympics.

Athlete	Event	Run 1		Run 2		Run 3		Run 4		Total	
Athlete	Event	Time	Rank	Time	Rank	Time	Rank	Time	Rank	Time	Rank
Jiří Džmura; Roman Hrabaň	Two-man	1:01.37	21	1:02.33	28	1:02.25	27	1:02.36	25	4:08.31	25
Petr Ramseidl; Zdeněk Kohout	Two-man	1:02.46	33	1:02.48	30	1:03.10	34	1:02.80	31	4:10.84	31
Jiří Džmura; Pavel Puškár; Karel Dostál; Roman Hrabaň	Four-man	59.30	22	59.66	21	59.92	21	59.67	21	3:58.557	21

== Cross-country skiing ==
The men's 50-kilometer freestyle marathon was the highlight of Czechoslovakia's men. Radim Nyč and Pavel Benc finished in top eight. Václav Korunka missed the top ten, but recorded three top-20 performances. In women's races Alžběta Havrančíková performed great in the second, freestyle-pursuit part of the combination race to move up from 34th to 17th place. Young Kateřina Neumannová took part in her first Olympics. The strong Czech and Slovak team-up of the women's relay fought for medals before losing pace in the last stage run by Iveta Zelingerová.

Men

Athlete	Event	Race	
Athlete	Event	Time	Rank
Pavel Benc	10 km classical	31:13.6	41
Pavel Benc	15 km freestyle pursuit	43:02.0	33
Pavel Benc	50 km freestyle	2:08:13.6	8
Václav Korunka	10 km classical	29:43.4	17
Václav Korunka	15 km freestyle pursuit	41:03.5	14
Václav Korunka	50 km freestyle	2:10:30.7	13
Radim Nyč	10 km classical	30:31.5	33
Radim Nyč	15 km freestyle pursuit	42:16.0	25
Radim Nyč	50 km freestyle	2:07:41.5	6
Martin Petrásek	10 km classical	32:27.4	66
Martin Petrásek	15 km freestyle pursuit	45:57.1	55
Martin Petrásek	30 km classical	1:28:30.8	24
Lubomír Buchta	30 km classical	1:25:40.6	13
Jiří Teplý	30 km classical	1:26:14.4	18
Jiří Teplý	50 km freestyle	2:12:00.2	21
Radim Nyč; Lubomír Buchta; Pavel Benc; Václav Korunka	4×10 km relay	1:44:20.0	7

Women

Athlete	Event	Race	
Athlete	Event	Time	Rank
Lubomíra Balážová	5 km classical	14:54.6	11
Lubomíra Balážová	10 km freestyle pursuit	29:11.0	26
Lubomíra Balážová	15 km classical	45:22.6	13
Alžběta Havrančíková	5 km classical	15:44.6	34
Alžběta Havrančíková	10 km freestyle pursuit	28:39.9	17
Alžběta Havrančíková	30 km freestyle	1:27:54.9	11
Kateřina Neumannová	5 km classical	14:59.1	13
Kateřina Neumannová	10 km freestyle pursuit	28:56.6	22
Kateřina Neumannová	15 km classical	45:28.6	14
Iveta Zelingerová	5 km classical	15:06.4	18
Iveta Zelingerová	10 km freestyle pursuit	29:03.4	24
Iveta Zelingerová	30 km freestyle	1:31:39.1	22
Anna Janoušková	15 km classical	47:29.3	33
Anna Janoušková	30 km freestyle	1:32:43.9	27
Zora Simčáková	15 km classical	45:45.6	18
Zora Simčáková	30 km freestyle	1:33:10.3	30
Lubomíra Balážová; Kateřina Neumannová; Alžběta Havrančíková; Iveta Zelingerová	4×5 km relay	1:01:37.4	6

== Figure skating ==
Reigning European Champion Petr Barna won his only Olympic medal behind Unified Team's Viktor Petrenko and United States' Paul Wylie. During his free program, Barna was the first skater to land the quadruple jump in the Olympic competition. The program was choreographed on the Hamlet soundtrack and was Barna's artistic masterpiece.

Radka Kovaříková and René Novotný teamed up after Novotný's 1988 Winter Olympics medicine problem. They beat Shishkova and Naumov of the Unified Team in the competition, but lost to Isabelle Brasseur and Lloyd Eisler of Canada in a close battle for the bronze medal, feeling a sort of injustice.

Kateřina Mrázová and Martin Šimeček finished 10th in the ice-dancing competition, while Lenka Kulovaná finished 11th. She was fifth in the 1992 European Championships, but lost to two European opponents only in Albertville.

Athlete(s)	Event	CD1	CD2	SP/OD	FS/FD	Total	
Athlete(s)	Event	FP	FP	FP	FP	TFP	Rank
Petr Barna	Men's	—N/a		2 Q	3	4.0	3rd place, bronze medalist(s)
Lenka Kulovaná	Ladies'	—N/a		9 Q	12	16.5	11
Radka Kovaříková & René Novotný	Pairs	—N/a		4	4	6.0	4
Kateřina Mrázová & Martin Šimeček	Ice dancing	12	11	12	10	20.6	10

== Ice hockey ==
In 1991, Czechoslovakia failed to win a medal at the World Championships in Finland. Stanislav Neveselý and Josef Horešovský were sacked and the team was coached by Ivan Hlinka in Albertville. He named ten members of the 1991 World Championships for their Olympic squad. The team entered the group hammering Norway and coming back from 0-2 against France. Robert Lang's two goals helped beat Unified Team, which was the only one loss of the later Olympic champions. Czechoslovakia itself then recorded its first loss against Canada, but confirmed their quarterfinals participation with a win over Switzerland.

Sweden, the reigning World Champions, met Czechoslovakia in the quarterfinals, but was beaten as Kadlec, Janecký and Augusta scored their goals and Czechoslovakia headed to the semifinals against Canada again. The game was more balanced than the group one, but was lost 2-4. The team however had not problems finding motivation to beat United States for the bronze medal. Robert Lang was the top scoring player of the team (13 points).

Team roster

- Goalkeepers: Petr Bříza, Oldřich Svoboda, Jaromír Dragan
- Defenders: Leo Gudas, Miloslav Hořava, Drahomír Kadlec, Bedřich Ščerban, Richard Šmehlík, František Procházka, Róbert Švehla, Jiří Šlégr
- Forwards: Petr Rosol, Robert Lang, Kamil Kašťák, Richard Žemlička, Ladislav Lubina, Radek Ťoupal, Peter Veselovský, Petr Hrbek, Otakar Janecký, Patrik Augusta, Tomáš Jelínek, Igor Liba
- Coaches: Ivan Hlinka, Jaroslav Walter

Team	CAN	Unified Team	TCH	FRA	SUI	NOR
CAN		4-5	5–1	3–2	6–1	10–0
Unified Team	5-4		3–4	8–0	8-1	8-1
TCH	1-5	4–3		6-4	4–2	10-1
FRA	2-3	0–8	4–6		4–3	4–2
SUI	1–6	1–8	2–4	3–4		6–3
NOR	0–10	1–8	1–10	2–4	3–6	

Team	GP	W	L	T	GF	GA	DIF	PTS
Canada	5	4	1	0	28	9	19	8
Unified Team	5	4	1	0	32	10	22	8
Czechoslovakia	5	4	1	0	25	15	10	8
France	5	2	3	0	14	22	-8	4
Switzerland	5	1	4	0	13	25	-12	2
Norway	5	0	5	0	7	38	-31	0

- February 8

Czechoslovakia	10:1	Norway

- February 10

France	4:6	Czechoslovakia

- February 12

Czechoslovakia	4:3	Unified Team

- February 14

Canada	5:1	Czechoslovakia

- February 16

Czechoslovakia	4:2	Switzerland

Medal Round
Quarter-finals

February 18	Czechoslovakia	3:1 (1-1, 0-0, 2-0)	Sweden

Semi-finals

February 21	Canada	4:2 (2-1, 0-1, 2-0)	Czechoslovakia

Bronze Medal Game

February 22	Czechoslovakia	6:1 (2-0, 1-0, 3-1)	United States

== Luge ==
Petr Urban was the leading and most controversial member of the Czechoslovakia's luge team. He recorded two top-20 finishes, but was soon excluded from the team because of his cartoon jokes he published in daily Sport while competing in Albertville.

Athlete(s)	Event	Run 1	Run 2	Run 3	Run 4	Total	
Athlete(s)	Event	Time	Time	Time	Time	Time	Rank
Jan Kohoutek	Men's	46.156	46.261	46.958	47.067	3:06.442	20
Petr Urban	Men's	46.211	46.285	46.961	46.812	3:06.269	19
Mária Jasenčáková	Women's	47.673	47.483	47.694	47.593	3:10.443	20
Petra Matěchová	Women's	47.298	47.323	47.749	47.290	3:09.660	17
Petr Urban; Jan Kohoutek	Doubles	47.005	47.219	—N/a		1:34.274	15

== Nordic combined ==
Athlete	Event	Ski jumping		Cross-country		
Athlete	Event	Points	Rank	Deficit	Time	Rank
Martin Bayer	Individual	188.2	37	+4:28.7	55:11.2 +10:43.1	41
Josef Kovařík	Individual	193.3	30	+3:54.7	48:41.8 +4:13.7	17
Milan Kučera	Individual	205.0	16	+2:36.7	Did not finish	
František Máka	Individual	197.1	27	+3:29.4	48:02.8 +3:34.7	15
František Máka; Milan Kučera; Josef Kovařík	Team	546.7	8	+8:12	1::32:41.2 +8:12	6

== Ski jumping ==
Jiří Parma was Czechoslovakia's flag-bearer at the 1988 Winter Olympics, but recorded his best ever Olympic results in 1992. He led the team in a dramatic competition, where only Czechoslovakia managed to get closer to the uncontested duo of Austria and gold medal winning Finland. He added large hill fifth place and normal hill 10th place.

Athlete	Event	Jump 1		Jump 2			
Athlete	Event	Points	Rank	Points	Rank	Total	Rank
Tomáš Goder	Normal hill	83.9	52	91.4	36	175.3	48
Tomáš Goder	Large hill	90.6	14	74.2	25	164.8	20
František Jež	Normal hill	99.7	19	93.0	33	192.7	23
František Jež	Large hill	91.5	12	79.8	18	171.3	13
Jiří Parma	Normal hill	109.2	5	98.7	18	207.9	10
Jiří Parma	Large hill	101.1	5	96.9	5	198.0	5
Jaroslav Sakala	Normal hill	101.1	17	99.7	16	200.8	15
Jaroslav Sakala	Large hill	85.7	21	45.7	51	131.4	41
Tomáš Goder; František Jež; Jaroslav Sakala; Jiří Parma	Team	325.6	3	294.5	3	620.1	3rd place, bronze medalist(s)

== Speed skating ==
Only two Czechoslovakia's speed skaters took part in the Games, but none of them was able to fight the competition for better than low-place finishes.

Men

Athlete	Event	Final	
Athlete	Event	Time	Rank
Jiří Kyncl	500 m	40.92	39
Jiří Kyncl	5000 m	7:27.78	27
Jiří Kyncl	10000 m	15:03.97	25
Jiří Musil	500 m	42.20	41
Jiří Musil	5000 m	7:29.91	29
Jiří Musil	10000 m	15:14.18	28
