= Päivi Simukka =

Finnish cross-country skier

Personal information
- Nationality: Finland
- Born: 21 January 1966 (age 60) Kerava, Finland

Sport
- Sport: Skiing

World Cup career
- Seasons: 4 – (1987, 1990–1992)
- Indiv. starts: 6
- Indiv. podiums: 0
- Team starts: 1
- Team podiums: 0
- Overall titles: 0

Päivi Simukka (born 21 January 1966) is a Finnish former cross-country skier. She competed in the women's 30 kilometre freestyle event at the 1992 Winter Olympics.

== Cross-country skiing results ==
All results are sourced from the International Ski Federation (FIS).

=== Olympic Games ===
Year	Age	5 km	15 km	Pursuit	30 km	4 × 5 km relay
1992	26	—	—	—	37	—

=== World Cup ===
==== Season standings ====
Season	Age	Overall
1987	21	NC
1990	24	NC
1991	25	NC
1992	26	NC
