= Ina Kümmel =

German cross-country skier (born 1967)

Personal information
- Nationality: Germany
- Born: 30 August 1967 (age 58) East Germany

Sport
- Sport: Skiing

World Cup career
- Seasons: 8 – (1990–1997)
- Indiv. starts: 39
- Indiv. podiums: 0
- Team starts: 6
- Team podiums: 0
- Overall titles: 0 – (24th in 1991)
- Discipline titles: 0

Ina Kümmel (born 30 August 1967) is a former German cross-country skier who competed from 1990 to 1997. She finished eighth in the 4 × 5 km relay at the 1992 Winter Olympics in Albertville.

Kümmel's best finish at the FIS Nordic World Ski Championships was ninth in the 30 km event at Val di Fiemme in 1991. Her best World Cup finish was tenth twice (1990, 1995).

Kümmel's best individual career finish was second twice in lesser events at distances up to 10 km (1993, 1994).

== Cross-country skiing results ==
All results are sourced from the International Ski Federation (FIS).

=== Olympic Games ===
Year	Age	5 km	15 km	Pursuit	30 km	4 × 5 km relay
1992	25	—	—	—	46	8

=== World Championships ===
Year	Age	5 km	10 km	15 km	Pursuit	30 km	4 × 5 km relay
1991	24	—	13	24	—N/a	9	5
1995	28	45	—N/a	24	22	18	5

=== World Cup ===
==== Season standings ====
Season	Age	Overall	Long Distance	Sprint
1990	23	31	—N/a	—N/a
1991	24	24	—N/a	—N/a
1992	25	NC	—N/a	—N/a
1993	26	62	—N/a	—N/a
1994	27	NC	—N/a	—N/a
1995	28	33	—N/a	—N/a
1996	29	NC	—N/a	—N/a
1997	30	NC	NC	—
