= Sue Forbes =

American cross-country skier (born 1961)

Personal information
- Born: July 25, 1961 (age 65) Anchorage, Alaska, United States

Sport
- Sport: Skiing

World Cup career
- Seasons: 1 – (1992)
- Indiv. starts: 1
- Indiv. podiums: 0
- Team starts: 0

Sue Forbes (born July 25, 1961) is an American cross-country skier. She competed in the women's 15 kilometre classical event at the 1992 Winter Olympics.

== Cross-country skiing results ==
All results are sourced from the International Ski Federation (FIS).

=== Olympic Games ===
Year	Age	5 km	15 km	Pursuit	30 km	4 × 5 km relay
1992	30	—	41	—	—	—

=== World Cup ===
==== Season standings ====
Season	Age	Overall
1992	30	NC
