= Laura Bettega =

Italian cross-country skier (born 1968)

Personal information
- Nationality: Italy
- Born: 20 January 1968 (age 58) Feltre, Italy

Sport
- Sport: Skiing

World Cup career
- Seasons: 2 – (1992–1993)
- Indiv. starts: 12
- Indiv. podiums: 0
- Team starts: 1
- Team podiums: 0
- Overall titles: 0
Medal record
Women's cross-country skiing
Representing Italy
Junior World Championships
Bronze medal – third place	1988 Saafelden	4 × 5 km relay

Laura Bettega (born 20 January 1968) is an Italian former cross-country skier. She competed in the women's 30 kilometre freestyle event at the 1992 Winter Olympics.

== Cross-country skiing results ==
All results are sourced from the International Ski Federation (FIS).

=== Olympic Games ===
Year	Age	5 km	15 km	Pursuit	30 km	4 × 5 km relay
1992	24	—	—	—	35	—

=== World Cup ===
==== Season standings ====
Season	Age	Overall
1992	26	NC
1993	27	NC
