= Sirpa Ryhänen =

Finnish cross-country skier

Personal information
- Nationality: Finland
- Born: 27 November 1966 (age 59) Ilomantsi, Finland

Sport
- Sport: Skiing
- Club: Ylikiimingin Nuijamiehet

World Cup career
- Seasons: 5 – (1987, 1991–1994)
- Indiv. starts: 20
- Indiv. podiums: 0
- Team starts: 2
- Team podiums: 1
- Team wins: 0
- Overall titles: 0 – (43rd in 1992)

Sirpa Ryhänen (born 27 November 1966) is a Finnish cross-country skier. She competed in the women's 15 kilometre classical event at the 1992 Winter Olympics.

== Cross-country skiing results ==
All results are sourced from the International Ski Federation (FIS).

=== Olympic Games ===
Year	Age	5 km;	15 km	Pursuit	30 km	4 × 5 km relay
1992	25	—	22	—	36	—

=== World Championships ===
Year	Age	5 km	15 km	Pursuit	30 km	4 × 5 km relay
1993	26	—	—	—	49	—

=== World Cup ===
==== Season standings ====
Season	Age	Overall
1987	20	46
1991	24	NC
1992	25	43
1993	26	51
1994	27	45
