= Karin Säterkvist =

Swedish cross-country skier

Personal information
- Nationality: Sweden
- Born: 9 August 1972 (age 53) Falun, Sweden

Sport
- Sport: Skiing
- Club: Kvarnsvedens IF

World Cup career
- Seasons: 1992, 1994–1999
- Indiv. starts: 17
- Indiv. podiums: 0
- Team starts: 6
- Team podiums: 0
- Overall titles: 0 – (74th in 1997)
- Discipline titles: 0
Medal record
Women's cross-country skiing
Representing Sweden
Junior World Championships
Bronze medal – third place	1992 Vuokatti	5 km classical
Bronze medal – third place	1992 Vuokatti	4 × 5 km relay

Karin Säterkvist (born 9 August 1972) is a Swedish cross-country skier who competed from 1992 to 1999. Competing in two Winter Olympics, she had her best finish of seventh in the 4 × 5 km relay at Albertville in 1992 and her best individual finish of 25th in the 15 km event at Nagano in 1998.

Säterkvist's best finish at the FIS Nordic World Ski Championships was 32nd in the 5 km + 10 km combined pursuit at Trondheim in 1997. Her best World Cup finish was 17th in an individual sprint event in Germany in 1996.

Säterkvist's best individual career finish was third twice at lower level events (1996, 1998).

== Cross-country skiing results ==
All results are sourced from the International Ski Federation (FIS).

=== Olympic Games ===
Year	Age	5 km	15 km	Pursuit	30 km	4 × 5 km relay
1992	19	34	—	30	—	7
1998	25	36	25	28	45	8

=== World Championships ===
Year	Age	5 km	15 km	Pursuit	30 km	4 × 5 km relay
1997	24	52	33	32	—	9

=== World Cup ===
==== Season standings ====
Season	Age	Overall	Long Distance	Sprint
1992	20	NC	—N/a	—N/a
1994	22	NC	—N/a	—N/a
1995	23	NC	—N/a	—N/a
1996	24	NC	—N/a	—N/a
1997	25	74	NC	60
1998	26	NC	NC	—
1999	27	NC	NC	—
