= Ingrid Butts =

American skier (born 1963)

Personal information
- Born: July 30, 1963 (age 62) Denver, Colorado, United States

Sport
- Sport: Skiing
- Club: Crested Butte Nordic Council

World Cup career
- Seasons: 4 – (1989, 1992–1994)
- Indiv. starts: 10
- Indiv. podiums: 0
- Team starts: 2
- Team podiums: 0
- Overall titles: 0

Ingrid Butts (born July 30, 1963) is an American cross-country skier. She competed at the 1992 Winter Olympics and the 1994 Winter Olympics.

== Cross-country skiing results ==
All results are sourced from the International Ski Federation (FIS).

=== Olympic Games ===
| Year | Age | 5 km | 15 km | Pursuit | 30 km | 4 × 5 km relay |
|---|---|---|---|---|---|---|
| 1992 | 28 | 47 | — | 48 | — | 13 |
| 1994 | 30 | 53 | — | 50 | — | — |

=== World Championships ===
| Year | Age | 5 km | 10 km classical | 10 km freestyle | 15 km | 30 km | 4 × 5 km relay |
|---|---|---|---|---|---|---|---|
| 1989 | 25 | —N/a | 44 | 36 | — | 31 | 11 |
| 1991 | 27 | — | —N/a | 30 | 30 | 34 | 12 |

=== World Cup ===
==== Season standings ====
| Season | Age | Overall |
|---|---|---|
| 1989 | 25 | NC |
| 1992 | 28 | NC |
| 1993 | 29 | NC |
| 1994 | 30 | NC |
