= Bettega =

Bettega is an Italian surname. Notable people with the surname include:

- Alessandro Bettega (born 1987), Italian footballer, son of Roberto
- Attilio Bettega (1953–1985), Italian rally driver
- Laura Bettega (born 1968), Italian cross-country skier
- Roberto Bettega (born 1950), Italian footballer
