= Sosna =

Sosna is a surname. Notable people with the surname include:

- Brandon Sosna (c. 1992–1993), American sports administrator and executive
- Jiří Sosna (born 1960), Czech judoka
- Kataržina Sosna (born 1990), Lithuanian racing cyclist
- Krzysztof Sosna (born 1969), Polish triathlete
