= Marie-Pierre Guilbaud =

French cross-country skier (born 1963)

Personal information
- Nationality: France
- Born: 4 May 1963 (age 63) Clermont-Ferrand, France

Sport
- Sport: Skiing

World Cup career
- Seasons: 2 – (1991–1992)
- Indiv. starts: 7
- Indiv. podiums: 0
- Team starts: 0
- Overall titles: 0

Marie-Pierre Guilbaud (born 5 April 1963) is a French cross-country skier. She competed in three events at the 1992 Winter Olympics.

== Cross-country skiing results ==
All results are sourced from the International Ski Federation (FIS).

=== Olympic Games ===
Year	Age	5 km	15 km	Pursuit	30 km	4 × 5 km relay
1992	28	37	—	46	DNF	—

=== World Cup ===
==== Season standings ====
Season	Age	Overall
1991	27	NC
1992	28	NC
