= Honduras at the 1992 Winter Olympics =

- IOC code: HON
- NOC: Honduran Olympic Committee
- Website: cohonduras.com (in Spanish)

in Albertville
- Competitors: 1 (woman) in 1 sport
- Flag bearer: Jenny Palacios-Stillo
- Medals: Gold 0 Silver 0 Bronze 0 Total 0

Winter Olympics appearances (overview)
- 1992; 1994–2022; 2026

Honduras was represented at the 1992 Winter Olympics in Albertville, France by the Honduran Olympic Committee.

In total, one woman represented Honduras in one sport: cross-country skiing.

The Honduran delegation at the 1992 Winter Olympics remains the only one to represent the country at the Winter Olympics. Cross-country skier Jenny Palacios-Stillo is the only Honduran athlete to compete at a Winter Olympics.

== Background ==
Honduras had never competed at a Winter Olympics before.

== Competitors ==
In total, one athlete represented Honduras at the 1992 Winter Olympics in Albertville, France in one sport.

Sport	Men	Women	Total
Cross-country skiing	0	1	1
Total	0	1	1

== Cross-country skiing ==
In total, one Honduran athletes participated in the cross-country skiing events – Jenny Palacios-Stillo in the women's 5 km classical, the women's 10 km freestyle pursuit and the women's 15 km classical.

The cross-country skiing events took place at the Les Saisies ski resort in Savoie, France from 9 to 22 February 1992.

The women's 15 km classical took place on 9 February 1992. Palacios-Stillo completed the course in a time of one hour 10 minutes 9.2 seconds to finish 50th overall.

The women's 5 km classical took place on 13 February 1992. Palacios-Stillo completed the course in a time of 23 minutes 21.5 seconds to finish 62nd overall.

The women's 10 km freestyle pursuit took place on 13 February 1992. Palacios-Stillo completed the course in a time of 48 minutes 49.6 seconds to finish 58th overall.

Women

Event	Athlete	Race	
Event	Athlete	Time	Rank
5 km C	Jenny Palacios-Stillo	23:21.5	62
10 km pursuit^{2} F	Jenny Palacios-Stillo	48:49.6	58
15 km C	Jenny Palacios-Stillo	1'10:09.2	50

^{2} Starting delay based on 5 km results.
C = Classical style, F = Freestyle

== Aftermath ==
Honduras have not competed at a Winter Olympics since 1992.
