= Anna Stera-Kustusz =

Polish biathlete

Anna Maria Stera-Kustucz (also spelled Kustucz, born 14 November 1974 in Duszniki-Zdrój) is a Polish biathlete. Her biggest achievement was taking third place in Biathlon World Championships 1993 in team-contest together with Zofia Kiełpińska, Krystyna Liberda and Helena Mikołajczyk.

== Achievements ==
=== Biathlon at the Winter Olympics ===
Year	Place	IN	SP	PU	MS	RL
1994	Lillehammer		62			11
1998	Nagano	17	6			13
2002	Salt Lake City/Park City	54	43	43		

IN – individual run, SP – sprint, PU – individual pursuit, MS – mass-run, RL – relay run

=== Biathlon World Championships ===
==== Places of World Championships' podium ====
Place	Individual run	Sprint	Individual pursuit	Mass-run	Relay race	Team-run	Total
1.							
2.							
3.	1						1
Top 10	2	3			5	1	11
Points	13	10	8	2	20	1	54
Starts	37	50	19	2	20	1	129
