= Carina Görlin =

Swedish cross-country skier

Personal information
- Nationality: Sweden
- Born: 17 February 1963 (age 63) Borlänge, Sweden

Sport
- Sport: Skiing
- Club: Hudiksvalls IF

World Cup career
- Seasons: 1986, 1989, 1991–1994
- Indiv. starts: 25
- Indiv. podiums: 0
- Team starts: 4
- Team podiums: 1
- Team wins: 1
- Overall titles: 0 – (25th in 1991)

Carina Görlin (born 17 February 1963) is a Swedish former cross-country skier who competed from 1991 to 1994. Competing at the 1992 Winter Olympics in Albertville, she had her best career finish of seventh in the 4 × 5 km relay and her best individual finish of 14th in the 5 km.

Görlin's best finish at the FIS Nordic World Ski Championships was tenth in the 15 km event at Val di Fiemme in 1991. Her best World Cup finish was 12th twice, both in 5 km events in 1991.

Görlin's best finish was ninth on three occasions in 10 km events in Sweden from 1992 to 1994.

In 1993, she won Tjejvasan.

== Cross-country skiing results ==
All results are sourced from the International Ski Federation (FIS).

=== Olympic Games ===
Year	Age	5 km	15 km	Pursuit	30 km	4 × 5 km relay
1992	29	14	23	23	—	7

=== World Championships ===
Year	Age	5 km	10 km classical	10 km freestyle	15 km	Pursuit	30 km	4 × 5 km relay
1989	26	—N/a	29	—	—	—N/a	—	—
1991	28	14	—N/a	—	10	—N/a	—	6
1993	30	17	—N/a	—N/a	12	33	—	6

=== World Cup ===
==== Season standings ====
Season	Age	Overall
1986	23	NC
1989	26	NC
1991	28	25
1992	29	36
1993	30	31
1994	31	NC

==== Team podiums ====
- 1 victory
- 1 podium

No.	Season	Date	Location	Race	Level	Place	Teammates
1	1985–86	13 March 1986	Oslo, Norway	4 × 5 km Relay F	World Cup	1st	Frost / Lamberg-Skog / Dahlman
