= Jane Vincent =

Canadian cross-country skier

Personal information
- Nationality: Canada
- Born: August 23, 1966 (age 59)

Sport
- Sport: Skiing

World Cup career
- Seasons: 3 – (1987, 1991–1992)
- Indiv. starts: 8
- Indiv. podiums: 0
- Team starts: 2
- Team podiums: 0
- Overall titles: 0

Jane Vincent (born 23 August 1966) is a Canadian former cross-country skier who competed in the 1992 Winter Olympics.

== Cross-country skiing results ==
All results are sourced from the International Ski Federation (FIS).

=== Olympic Games ===
Year	Age	5 km	15 km	Pursuit	30 km	4 × 5 km relay
1992	25	53	—	49	40	11

=== World Cup ===
==== Season standings ====
Season	Age	Overall
1987	20	NC
1991	24	NC
1992	25	NC
