= Ruchała =

Ruchała is a surname. Notable people with the surname include:

- Małgorzata Ruchała (born 1961), Polish cross-country skier
- Robert Ruchała (born 1998), Polish mixed martial artist
