= Zora Simčáková =

Slovak cross-country skier (born 1963)

Personal information
- Nationality: Slovakia
- Born: 27 March 1963 (age 63) Liptovský Hrádok, Czechoslovakia

Sport
- Sport: Skiing

World Cup career
- Seasons: 3 – (1989–1990, 1992)
- Indiv. starts: 10
- Indiv. podiums: 0
- Team starts: 1
- Team podiums: 0
- Overall titles: 0 – (33rd in 1990)

Zora Simčáková (born 27 March 1963) is a Slovak cross-country skier. She competed in the women's 15 kilometre classical event at the 1992 Winter Olympics.

== Cross-country skiing results ==
All results are sourced from the International Ski Federation (FIS).

=== Olympic Games ===
Year	Age	5 km	15 km	Pursuit	30 km	4 × 5 km relay
1992	28	—	18	—	30	—

=== World Championships ===
Year	Age	5 km	10 km classical	10 km freestyle	15 km	30 km	4 × 5 km relay
1989	25	—N/a	31	42	29	—	5
1991	27	33	—N/a	24	22	30	—

=== World Cup ===
==== Season standings ====
Season	Age	Overall
1989	25	NC
1990	26	33
1992	28	45
