= Rhonda DeLong =

Canadian cross-country skier

Personal information
- Nationality: Canada
- Born: 8 August 1965 (age 60)

Sport
- Sport: Skiing

World Cup career
- Seasons: 4 – (1992–1995)
- Indiv. starts: 16
- Indiv. podiums: 0
- Team starts: 2
- Team podiums: 0
- Overall titles: 0
- Updated on 25 January 2019

Rhonda DeLong (born 8 August 1965) is a Canadian former cross-country skier who competed in the 1992 Winter Olympics.

== Cross-country skiing results ==
All results are sourced from the International Ski Federation (FIS).

=== Olympic Games ===
Year	Age	5 km	15 km	Pursuit	30 km	4 × 5 km relay
1992	26	41	43	40	—	11

=== World Championships ===
Year	Age	5 km	10 km	15 km	Pursuit	30 km	4 × 5 km relay
1991	25	48	—	—	—N/a	—	—
1993	27	57	—N/a	34	44	—	14
1995	29	—	—N/a	47	—	—	13

=== World Cup ===
==== Season standings ====
Season	Age	Overall
1992	26	NC
1993	27	NC
1994	28	NC
1995	29	NC
