= Biathlon at the 1992 Winter Olympics – Men's individual =

Men's biathlon individual at the XVI Olympic Winter Games
- Venue: Les Saisies
- Dates: February 20, 1992
- Competitors: 94 from 27 nations
- Winning time: 57:34.4

Medalists
1st place, gold medalist(s)		Yevgeny Redkin	Unified Team
2nd place, silver medalist(s)		Mark Kirchner	Germany
3rd place, bronze medalist(s)		Mikael Löfgren	Sweden

The Men's 20 kilometre individual biathlon competition at the 1992 Winter Olympics was held on 20 February, at Les Saisies. Each miss resulted in one minute being added to a competitor's skiing time.

== Results ==
Rank	Name	Country	Ski Time	Penalties	Result	Deficit
1st place, gold medalist(s)	Yevgeny Redkin	Unified Team	57:34.4	0	57:34.4	-
2nd place, silver medalist(s)	Mark Kirchner	Germany	54:40.8	3	57:40.8	+0:06.4
3rd place, bronze medalist(s)	Mikael Löfgren	Sweden	55:59.4	2	57:59.4	+0:25.0
4	Alexandr Popov	Unified Team	56:02.9	2	58:02.9	+0:28.5
5	Harri Eloranta	Finland	57:15.7	1	58:15.7	+0:41.3
6	Vesa Hietalahti	Finland	57:24.6	1	58:24.6	+0:50.2
7	Johann Passler	Italy	54:25.9	4	58:25.9	+0:51.5
8	Frode Løberg	Norway	57:32.4	1	58:32.4	+0:58.0
9	Gisle Fenne	Norway	57:32.9	1	58:32.9	+0:58.5
10	Sergei Tchepikov	Unified Team	55:47.6	3	58:47.6	+1:13.2
11	Valery Kiriyenko	Unified Team	55:12.6	4	59:12.6	+1:38.2
12	Mike Dixon	Great Britain	59:20.2	0	59:20.2	+1:45.8
13	Christian Dumont	France	57:27.0	2	59:27.0	+1:52.6
14	Krasimir Videnov	Bulgaria	58:32.5	1	59:32.5	+1:58.1
15	Jiří Holubec	Czechoslovakia	59:56.2	0	59:56.2	+2:21.8
16	Josh Thompson	United States	58:05.4	2	60:05.4	+2:31.0
17	Andreas Zingerle	Italy	56:05.6	4	60:05.6	+2:31.2
18	Steffen Hoos	Germany	59:17.7	1	60:17.7	+2:43.3
19	Gintaras Jasinskas	Lithuania	59:17.8	1	60:17.8	+2:43.4
20	Glenn Rupertus	Canada	59:18.3	1	60:18.3	+2:43.9
21	Boštjan Lekan	Slovenia	59:26.8	1	60:26.8	+2:52.4
22	Patrice Bailly-Salins	France	56:28.3	4	60:28.3	+2:53.9
23	Tomáš Kos	Czechoslovakia	58:33.3	2	60:33.3	+2:58.9
24	Sašo Grajf	Slovenia	57:39.2	3	60:39.2	+3:04.8
25	Martin Rypl	Czechoslovakia	57:39.3	3	60:39.3	+3:04.9
26	Tony Fiala	Canada	59:39.8	1	60:39.8	+3:05.4
27	Eirik Kvalfoss	Norway	58:52.4	2	60:52.4	+3:18.0
28	Misao Kodate	Japan	58:53.1	2	60:53.1	+3:18.7
29	Jens Steinigen	Germany	58:01.8	3	61:01.8	+3:27.4
30	Alfred Eder	Austria	60:03.0	1	61:03.0	+3:28.6
31	Spas Zlatev	Bulgaria	60:26.2	1	61:26.2	+3:51.8
32	Jan Ziemianin	Poland	57:44.7	4	61:44.7	+4:10.3
33	Janez Ožbolt	Slovenia	60:47.2	1	61:47.2	+4:12.8
34	Hillar Zahkna	Estonia	57:57.4	4	61:57.4	+4:23.0
35	Gundars Upenieks	Latvia	61:01.6	1	62:01.6	+4:27.2
36	Geir Einang	Norway	59:04.8	3	62:04.8	+4:30.4
37	Kalju Ojaste	Estonia	60:05.8	2	62:05.8	+4:31.4
38	Leif Andersson	Sweden	59:09.3	3	62:09.3	+4:34.9
39	Thierry Gerbier	France	60:24.8	2	62:24.8	+4:50.4
40	Wilfried Pallhuber	Italy	56:35.4	6	62:35.4	+5:01.0
41	Bruno Hofstätter	Austria	59:36.1	3	62:36.1	+5:01.7
42	Thanasis Tsakiris	Greece	60:37.2	2	62:37.2	+5:02.8
43	Anders Mannelqvist	Sweden	59:38.6	3	62:38.6	+5:04.2
44	Gottlieb Taschler	Italy	59:41.3	3	62:41.3	+5:06.9
45	Egon Leitner	Austria	58:52.0	4	62:52.0	+5:17.6
46	Steve Cyr	Canada	59:06.9	4	63:06.9	+5:32.5
47	Lionel Laurent	France	59:10.6	4	63:10.6	+5:36.2
48	Urmas Kaldvee	Estonia	59:15.1	4	63:15.1	+5:40.7
49	Franz Schuler	Austria	57:15.9	6	63:15.9	+5:41.5
50	Wang Weiyi	China	60:30.0	3	63:30.0	+5:55.6
51	Curt Schreiner	United States	60:34.2	3	63:34.2	+5:59.8
52	Tang Guoliang	China	62:39.1	1	63:39.1	+6:04.7
53	Frank-Peter Roetsch	Germany	56:44.0	7	63:44.0	+6:09.6
54	Jean-Marc Chabloz	Switzerland	59:45.6	4	63:45.6	+6:11.2
55	Tibor Géczi	Hungary	59:56.3	4	63:56.3	+6:21.9
56	Jure Velepec	Slovenia	62:12.6	2	64:12.6	+6:38.2
57	Kristjan Oja	Estonia	61:15.9	3	64:15.9	+6:41.5
58	Dariusz Kozłowski	Poland	60:17.2	4	64:17.2	+6:42.8
59	Duncan Douglas	United States	58:17.5	6	64:17.5	+6:43.1
60	Krzysztof Sosna	Poland	57:24.1	7	64:24.1	+6:49.7
61	Ilmārs Bricis	Latvia	59:27.3	5	64:27.3	+6:52.9
62	Aivars Bogdanovs	Latvia	60:28.5	4	64:28.5	+6:54.1
63	Atsushi Kazama	Japan	58:32.8	6	64:32.8	+6:58.4
64	Ulf Johansson	Sweden	62:58.2	2	64:58.2	+7:23.8
65	Kenneth Rudd	Great Britain	60:09.1	5	65:09.1	+7:34.7
66	Ivan Masařík	Czechoslovakia	58:24.9	7	65:24.9	+7:50.5
67	Jason Sklenar	Great Britain	61:28.9	4	65:28.9	+7:54.5
68	Khristo Vodenicharov	Bulgaria	61:32.7	4	65:32.7	+7:58.3
69	Oļegs Maļuhins	Latvia	60:10.1	6	66:10.1	+8:35.7
70	Jon Engen	United States	61:18.4	5	66:18.4	+8:44.0
71	Nicolae Şerban	Romania	61:33.3	5	66:33.3	+8:58.9
72	Zbigniew Filip	Poland	59:40.9	7	66:40.9	+9:06.5
73	Boycho Popov	Bulgaria	64:03.7	3	67:03.7	+9:29.3
74	Seppo Suhonen	Finland	59:21.3	8	67:21.3	+9:46.9
75	Tan Hongbin	China	62:24.1	5	67:24.1	+9:49.7
76	Paul Ryan	Great Britain	63:38.8	4	67:38.8	+10:04.4
77	Jean Paquet	Canada	59:36.2	9	68:36.2	+11:01.8
78	János Panyik	Hungary	60:37.7	8	68:37.7	+11:03.3
79	Mladen Grujić	Yugoslavia	62:40.6	6	68:40.6	+11:06.2
80	István Oláh Nelu	Hungary	62:08.6	7	69:08.6	+11:34.2
81	Zoran Ćosić	Yugoslavia	65:12.8	4	69:12.8	+11:38.4
82	Song Wenbin	China	62:39.7	8	70:39.7	+13:05.3
83	László Farkas	Hungary	62:54.3	8	70:54.3	+13:19.9
84	Admir Jamak	Yugoslavia	74:09.6	0	74:09.6	+16:35.2
85	Tomislav Lopatić	Yugoslavia	66:35.8	8	74:35.8	+17:01.4
86	Luis Ríos	Argentina	71:43.8	3	74:43.8	+17:09.4
87	Hong Byung-sik	South Korea	71:06.7	4	75:06.7	+17:32.3
88	Jang Dong-lin	South Korea	70:06.9	7	77:06.9	+19:32.5
89	Han Myung-hee	South Korea	71:28.1	8	79:28.1	+21:53.7
90	Marcelo Vásquez	Argentina	74:02.6	8	82:02.6	+24:28.2
91	Juan Fernández	Argentina	80:27.1	5	85:27.1	+27:52.7
92	Nikos Anastasiadis	Greece	78:45.5	7	85:45.5	+28:11.1
-	Kari Kataja	Finland	-	-	DNF	-
-	Roberto Lucero	Argentina	-	-	DNF	-
