= Ziemianin =

Ziemianin is a Polish surname. Notable people with the surname include:

- Jan Ziemianin (born 1962), Polish biathlete
- Wiesław Ziemianin (born 1970), Polish biathlete
