= Anna Janoušková =

Czech cross-country skier

Personal information
- Nationality: Czech Republic
- Born: 12 July 1965 (age 61)

Sport
- Sport: Skiing

World Cup career
- Seasons: 4 – (1989–1992)
- Indiv. starts: 14
- Indiv. podiums: 0
- Team starts: 1
- Team podiums: 0
- Overall titles: 0 – (24th in 1990)

Anna Janoušková (born 12 July 1965) is a Czech cross-country skier. She competed in the women's 15 kilometre classical event at the 1992 Winter Olympics.

== Personal life ==
Janoušková's daughter, Marianne Fatton, is a ski mountaineer.

== Cross-country skiing results ==
All results are sourced from the International Ski Federation (FIS).

=== Olympic Games ===
Year	Age	5 km	15 km	Pursuit	30 km	4 × 5 km relay
1992	26	—	33	—	27	—

=== World Championships ===
Year	Age	5 km	10 km classical	10 km freestyle	15 km	30 km	4 × 5 km relay
1989	23	—N/a	15	11	—	18	5
1991	25	32	—N/a	11	33	25	8

=== World Cup ===
==== Season standings ====
Season	Age	Overall
1989	23	42
1990	24	24
1991	25	39
1992	26	NC
