= Lucy Steele =

Canadian cross-country skier

Personal information
- Nationality: Canada
- Born: May 12, 1969 (age 57)

Sport
- Sport: Skiing

World Cup career
- Seasons: 5 – (1992–1995, 1997)
- Indiv. starts: 25
- Indiv. podiums: 0
- Team starts: 2
- Team podiums: 0
- Overall titles: 0

Lucy Steele (born 12 May 1969) is a Canadian former cross-country skier who competed in the 1992 Winter Olympics.

== Cross-country skiing results ==
All results are sourced from the International Ski Federation (FIS).

=== Olympic Games ===
Year	Age	5 km	15 km	Pursuit	30 km	4 × 5 km relay
1992	22	46	—	39	33	11

=== World Championships ===
Year	Age	5 km	10 km	15 km	Pursuit	30 km	4 × 5 km relay
1991	21	50	48	—	—N/a	—	—
1993	23	63	—N/a	—	52	38	14
1995	25	52	—N/a	—	47	38	13
1997	27	69	—N/a	55	57	—	—

=== World Cup ===
==== Season standings ====
Season	Age			
Season	Age	Overall	Long Distance	Sprint
1992	22	NC	—N/a	—N/a
1993	23	NC	—N/a	—N/a
1994	24	NC	—N/a	—N/a
1995	25	NC	—N/a	—N/a
1997	27	NC	NC	—
