= Gabriele Hess =

German cross-country skier (born 1971)

Personal information
- Born: 1 April 1971 (age 55) Leipzig, East Germany

Sport
- Sport: Skiing

World Cup career
- Seasons: 4 – (1989–1992)
- Indiv. starts: 19
- Indiv. podiums: 2
- Indiv. wins: 0
- Team starts: 4
- Team podiums: 0
- Overall titles: 0 – (12th in 1991)
Medal record
Women's cross-country skiing
Junior World Championships
Representing East Germany
Gold medal – first place	1988 Saafelden	15 km
Gold medal – first place	1988 Saafelden	3 × 5 km relay
Gold medal – first place	1990 Les Saisies	15 km freestyle
Silver medal – second place	1990 Les Saisies	4 × 5 km relay
Representing Germany
Gold medal – first place	1991 Reit im Winkl	15 km freestyle

Gabriele Hess (born 1 April 1971 in Leipzig, Saxony) is a German former cross-country skier who competed from 1989 to 1993. Competing at the 1992 Winter Olympics, she had her best career finish of eighth in the 4 × 5 km relay and her best individual finish of 14th in the 5 km + 10 km combined pursuit.

Hess' best finish at the FIS Nordic World Ski Championships was sixth in the 10 km event at Val di Fiemme in 1991. Her best World Cup finish was second twice in 30 km events in 1989 and 1990 which were also her best career finishes.

== Cross-country skiing results ==
All results are sourced from the International Ski Federation (FIS).

=== Olympic Games ===
Year	Age	5 km	15 km	Pursuit	30 km	4 × 5 km relay
1992	20	16	—	14	15	8

=== World Championships ===
Year	Age	5 km	10 km classical	10 km freestyle	15 km	30 km	4 × 5 km relay
1989	17	—N/a	—	9	—	—	13
1991	19	29	—N/a	6	—	14	5

=== World Cup ===
==== Season standings ====
Season	Age	Overall
1989	17	20
1990	18	18
1991	19	12
1992	20	28

==== Individual podiums ====
- 2 podiums

No.	Season	Date	Location	Race	Level	Place
1	1988–89	15 January 1989	Klingenthal, East Germany	30 km Individual F	World Cup	2nd
2	1989–90	7 March 1990	Sollefteå, Sweden	30 km Individual F	World Cup	2nd
