= Ann-Marie Karlsson =

Swedish cross-country skier

Personal information
- Nationality: Sweden
- Born: 21 March 1968 (age 58) Sävsjö, Sweden

Sport
- Sport: Skiing

World Cup career
- Seasons: 3 – (1990–1992)
- Indiv. starts: 11
- Indiv. podiums: 0
- Team starts: 1
- Team podiums: 0
- Overall titles: 0 – (32nd in 1992)
Medal record
Women's cross-country skiing
Representing Sweden
Junior World Championships
Silver medal – second place	1988 Saalfelden	5 km

Ann-Marie "Mia" Elizabeth Karlsson (born 21 March 1968) is a former Swedish cross-country skier. She competed at the 1992 Winter Olympics representing Sweden. She is the mother of cross-country skier Frida Karlsson.

== Cross-country skiing results ==
All results are sourced from the International Ski Federation (FIS).

=== Olympic Games ===
Year	Age	5 km	15 km	Pursuit	30 km	3 × 5 km relay
1992	23	33	—	35	38	—

=== World Championships ===
Year	Age	5 km	10 km	15 km	30 km	3 × 5 km relay
1991	22	—	34	—	13	—

=== World Cup ===
==== Season standings ====
Season	Age	Overall
1990	22	NC
1991	23	43
1992	24	32
