= Isabelle Mancini =

French cross-country skier (born 1967)

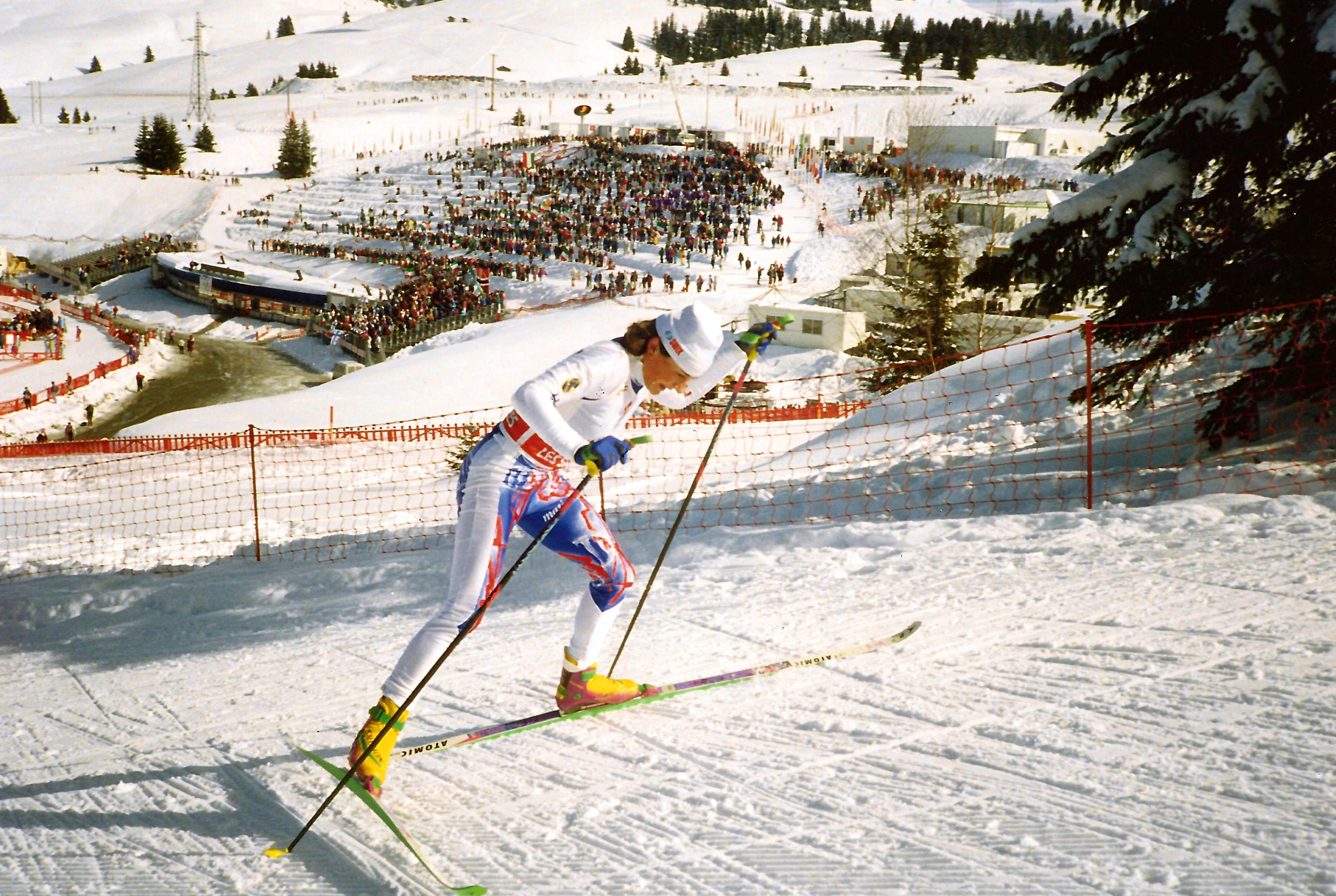

Personal information
- Nationality: France
- Born: 26 July 1967 (age 58) Arbois, France

Sport
- Sport: Skiing

World Cup career
- Seasons: 7 – (1988–1994)
- Indiv. starts: 32
- Indiv. podiums: 0
- Team starts: 3
- Team podiums: 0
- Overall titles: 0 – (13th in 1991)

Isabelle Mancini (born 26 July 1967 in Arbois, Jura) is a French cross-country skier who competed from 1988 to 1994. Competing in two Winter Olympics, she earned her best finishes at Albertville in 1992 with a fifth in the 4 × 5 km relay overall, and ninth in the 5 km + 10 km combined pursuit individually.

Mancini's best finish at the FIS Nordic World Ski Championships was tenth in the 30 km event at Val di Fiemme in 1991. Her best World Cup finish was sixth in a 15 km event in the United States in 1989.

Mancini's lone individual victory was in a 10 km Continental Cup event in France in 1993.

== Cross-country skiing results ==
All results are sourced from the International Ski Federation (FIS).

=== Olympic Games ===
Year	Age	5 km	15 km	Pursuit	30 km	4 × 5 km relay
1992	24	22	—	9	21	5
1994	26	51	39	30	—	—

=== World Championships ===
Year	Age	5 km	10 km classical	10 km freestyle	15 km	Pursuit	30 km	4 × 5 km relay
1989	21	—N/a	37	20	28	—N/a	35	9
1991	23	39	—N/a	33	—	—N/a	10	9
1993	25	28	—N/a	—N/a	—	18	14	9

=== World Cup ===
==== Season standings ====
Season	Age	Overall
1988	20	49
1989	21	NC
1990	22	28
1991	23	13
1992	24	24
1993	25	37
1994	26	71
