= Katarzyna Popieluch =

Polish cross-country skier

Personal information
- Nationality: Poland
- Born: 16 September 1963 (age 62) Nowy Targ, Poland

Sport
- Sport: Skiing
- Club: AZS Zakopane

World Cup career
- Seasons: 2 – (1989, 1992)
- Indiv. starts: 6
- Indiv. podiums: 0
- Team starts: 1
- Team podiums: 0
- Overall titles: 0

Katarzyna Popieluch (born 16 September 1963) is a Polish cross-country skier. She competed in the women's 15 kilometre classical event at the 1992 Winter Olympics.

== Cross-country skiing results ==
All results are sourced from the International Ski Federation (FIS).

=== Olympic Games ===
Year	Age	5 km	15 km	Pursuit	30 km	4 × 5 km relay
1992	28	—	38	—	DNF	—

=== World Championships ===
Year	Age	5 km	10 km classical	10 km freestyle	15 km	30 km	4 × 5 km relay
1989	25	—N/a	38	49	22	34	12
1991	27	23	—N/a	—	41	47	7

=== World Cup ===
==== Season standings ====
Season	Age	Overall
1989	25	NC
1992	28	NC
