= Ustupski =

Ustupski, feminine: Ustupska, is a Polish toponymic surname derived from the place Ustup, in Zakopane. Notable people with the surname include:

- Jerzy Ustupski (1911–2004), Polish rower
- Stanisław Ustupski (born 1966), Polish Nordic combined skier
