= Elvira Knecht =

Swiss cross-country skier

Personal information
- Nationality: Switzerland
- Born: 18 October 1972 (age 53)

Sport
- Sport: Skiing

World Cup career
- Seasons: 3 – (1992–1994)
- Indiv. starts: 14
- Indiv. podiums: 0
- Team starts: 1
- Team podiums: 0
- Overall titles: 0 – (62nd in 1993
Medal record
Women's cross-country skiing
Representing Switzerland
Junior World Championships
| Bronze medal – third place | 1990 Les Saisies | 4 × 5 km relay |

Elvira Knecht (born 18 October 1972) is a Swiss cross-country skier. She competed in four events at the 1992 Winter Olympics.

== Cross-country skiing results ==
All results are sourced from the International Ski Federation (FIS).

=== Olympic Games ===
| Year | Age | 5 km | 15 km | Pursuit | 30 km | 4 × 5 km relay |
|---|---|---|---|---|---|---|
| 1992 | 19 | 44 | — | 36 | 26 | 9 |

=== World Championships ===
| Year | Age | 5 km | 10 km freestyle | 15 km | Pursuit | 30 km | 4 × 5 km relay |
|---|---|---|---|---|---|---|---|
| 1991 | 18 | 47 | 40 | — | —N/a | 35 | 10 |
| 1993 | 20 | 60 | —N/a | — | 41 | 42 | — |

=== World Cup ===
==== Season standings ====
| Season | Age | Overall |
|---|---|---|
| 1991 | 19 | NC |
| 1992 | 20 | 62 |
| 1993 | 21 | NC |
