= 1992 Winter Olympics national flag bearers =

During the Parade of Nations section of the 1992 Winter Olympics opening ceremony, athletes from the participating countries marched into the arena. Each delegation was led by a flag bearer and a sign with the name of the country on it. The Parade of Nations was organized in French, the official language of France. As tradition dictates, Greece led the parade and France was the last to march to the stadium as the host nation.

== List ==
Order	Nation	French	Flag bearer	Sport
1	Greece	Grèce	Thanasis Tsakiris	Biathlon
2	Algeria	Algérie	Nacera Boukamoum	Alpine skiing
3	Germany	Allemagne	Wolfgang Hoppe	Bobsleigh
4	Andorra	Andorre		
5	Netherlands Antilles	Antilles néerlandaises	Dudley den Dulk	Bobsleigh
6	Argentina	Argentine	Carolina Eiras	Alpine skiing
7	Australia	Australie	Danny Kah	Speed skating
8	Austria	Autriche	Anita Wachter	Alpine skiing
9	Belgium	Belgique	Geert Blanchart	Short track speed skating
10	Bermuda	Bermudes	John Hoskins	Official
11	Bolivia	Bolivie	Guillermo Avila	Alpine skiing
12	Brazil	Brésil	Hans Egger	Alpine skiing
13	Bulgaria	Bulgarie	Iva Karagiozova-Shkodreva	Biathlon
14	Canada	Canada	Sylvie Daigle	Short track speed skating
15	Chile	Chili	Paulo Oppliger	Alpine skiing
16	China	République populaire de Chine	Song Chen	Speed skating
17	Cyprus	Chypre	Sokratis Aristodimou	Alpine skiing
18	South Korea	Corée	Lee Yeong-ha	Speed skating
19	Costa Rica	Costa Rica		
20	Croatia	Croatie	Tomislav Čižmešija	Figure skating
21	Denmark	Danemark	Ebbe Hartz	Cross-country skiing
22	Unified Team	Équipe unifiée	Valeriy Medvedtsev	Biathlon
23	Spain	Espagne	Blanca Fernández Ochoa	Alpine skiing
24	Estonia	Estonie	Ants Antson	Official from Estonian Olympic Committee
25	United States	États-Unis d'Amérique	Bill Koch	Cross-country skiing
26	Finland	Finlande	Timo Blomqvist	Ice hockey
27	Great Britain	Grande-Bretagne	Wilf O'Reilly	Short track speed skating
28	Honduras	Honduras	Jenny Palacios-Stillo	Cross-country skiing
29	Hungary	Hongrie	Attila Tóth	Figure skating
30	India	Inde		
31	Ireland	Irlande	Pat McDonagh	Bobsleigh
32	Iceland	Islande	Ásta Halldórsdóttir	Alpine skiing
33	Italy	Italie	Alberto Tomba	Alpine skiing
34	Jamaica	Jamaïque	Dudley Stokes	Bobsleigh
35	Japan	Japon	Tsutomu Kawasaki	Short track speed skating
36	Latvia	Lettonie	Jānis Ķipurs	Bobsleigh
37	Lebanon	Liban		
38	Liechtenstein	Liechtenstein	Birgit Heeb-Batliner	Alpine skiing
39	Lithuania	Lituanie	Gintaras Jasinskas	Biathlon
40	Luxembourg	Luxembourg	Marc Girardelli	Alpine skiing
41	Morocco	Maroc		
42	Mexico	Mexique	Roberto Alvarez	Cross-country skiing
43	Monaco	Monaco	Albert II, Prince of Monaco	Bobsleigh
44	Mongolia	Mongolie	Ziitsagaany Ganbat	Cross-country skiing
45	Norway	Norvège	Eirik Kvalfoss	Biathlon
46	New Zealand	Nouvelle-Zélande	Chris Nicholson	Short track speed skating
47	Netherlands	Pays-Bas	Leo Visser	Speed skating
48	Philippines	Philippines	Michael Teruel	Alpine skiing
49	Poland	Pologne	Henryk Gruth	Ice hockey
50	Puerto Rico	Porto Rico	Jorge Bonnet	Bobsleigh
51	North Korea	République populaire démocratique de Corée		
52	Romania	Roumanie	Ioan Apostol	Luge
53	San Marino	Saint-Marin	Andrea Sammaritani	Cross-country skiing
54	Senegal	Sénégal	Lamine Guèye	Alpine skiing
55	Slovenia	Slovénie	Franci Petek	Ski jumping
56	Sweden	Suède	Tomas Gustafson	Speed skating
57	Switzerland	Suisse	Vreni Schneider	Alpine skiing
58	Swaziland	Swaziland	Keith Fraser	Alpine skiing
59	Chinese Taipei	Chinese Taipei		
60	Czechoslovakia	Tchécoslovaquie	Pavel Benc	Cross-country skiing
61	Turkey	Turquie		
62	Virgin Islands	Îles Vierges	Anne Abernathy	Luge
63	Yugoslavia	Yougoslavie		
64	France	France	Fabrice Guy	Nordic combined
