= Evgeny Redkin =

Russian biathlete (born 1970)

Eugeni Redkine
Medal record

Men's biathlon

Representing the CIS

World Championships
Gold medal – first place	1992 Novosibirsk	Team event

Representing the Unified Team

Olympic Games
Gold medal – first place	1992 Albertville	20 km individual

Eugeni Leonidovitsch Redkine (Russian: Евгений Леонидович Редькин, Belarusian: Яўген Леанідавіч Рэдзькін, romanized: Jauhien Leanidavič Redzkin, born 2 February 1970 in Khanty-Mansiysk), known as Eugeni Redkine (also transliterated Evgeni Redkin or Yevgeny Redkin), is a former Belarusian biathlete. He won a surprising gold medal over 20 kilometres ahead of Mark Kirchner and Mikael Löfgren at the 1992 Winter Olympics.
