= Cross-country skiing at the 1992 Winter Olympics – Women's 10 kilometre freestyle pursuit =

Women's 10 kilometre freestyle pursuit at the XVI Olympic Winter Games
- Venue: Les Saisies
- Dates: 15 February 1992
- Competitors: 58 from 21 nations
- Winning time: 25:53.7

Medalists
1st place, gold medalist(s)		Lyubov Yegorova; Unified Team
2nd place, silver medalist(s)		Stefania Belmondo; Italy
3rd place, bronze medalist(s)		Yelena Välbe; Unified Team

The women's 10 kilometre freestyle pursuit cross-country skiing competition at the 1992 Winter Olympics in Albertville, France, was held on Saturday 15 February at Les Saisies. This was the first time a pursuit race was held in cross-country skiing at the Winter Olympics.

Each skier started based on the results from the 5 km classical event on 13 February, skiing the entire 10 kilometre course after the first-to-finish principle. Marjut Lukkarinen won the 5 km classical race with 0.9 seconds to Lyubov Yegorova of the Unified team. The two skiers started the pursuit simultaneously and Yegorova took over the lead and won over Italian Stefania Belmondo with 24.1 seconds.

== Results ==
Rank	Bib	Name	Country	Start	Time	Deficit
1st place, gold medalist(s)	2	Lyubov Yegorova	Unified Team	0:00	25:53.7	
2nd place, silver medalist(s)	4	Stefania Belmondo	Italy	0:12	26:17.8	+24.1
3rd place, bronze medalist(s)	3	Yelena Välbe	Unified Team	0:08	26:37.7	+44.0
4	1	Marjut Lukkarinen	Finland	0:00	26:52.1	+58.4
5	10	Elin Nilsen	Norway	0:37	27:13.9	+1:20.2
6	9	Marie-Helene Westin	Sweden	0:28	27:14.2	+1:20.5
7	5	Inger Helene Nybråten	Norway	0:19	27:21.1	+1:27.4
8	7	Larisa Lazutina	Unified Team	0:27	27:34.8	+1:41.1
9	22	Isabelle Mancini	France	0:58	27:39.3	+1:45.6
10	12	Manuela Di Centa	Italy	0:41	27:55.7	+2:02.0
11	6	Olga Danilova	Unified Team	0:23	28:10.2	+2:16.5
12	27	Simone Opitz	Germany	1:11	28:17.3	+2:23.6
13	15	Sylvia Honegger	Switzerland	0:49	28:17.7	+2:24.0
14	16	Gabriele Hess	Germany	0:49	28:19.2	+2:25.5
15	8	Solveig Pedersen	Norway	0:28	28:26.6	+2:32.9
16	23	Gabriella Paruzzi	Italy	1:00	28:38.8	+2:45.1
17	34	Alžbeta Havrančíková	Czechoslovakia	1:30	28:39.9	+2:46.2
18	26	Jaana Savolainen	Finland	1:06	28:43.1	+2:49.4
19	30	Fumiko Aoki	Japan	1:19	28:44.4	+2:50.7
20	28	Bice Vanzetta	Italy	1:14	28:48.7	+2:55.0
21	24	Dorota Kwaśny	Poland	1:02	28:54.7	+3:01.0
22	13	Kateřina Neumannová	Czechoslovakia	0:45	28:56.5	+3:02.8
23	14	Carina Görlin	Sweden	0:47	28:57.6	+3:03.9
24	18	Iveta Zelingerová	Czechoslovakia	0:52	29:03.4	+3:09.7
25	17	Heike Wezel	Germany	0:50	29:08.6	+3:14.9
26	11	Lubomíra Balážová	Czechoslovakia	0:40	29:11.0	+3:17.3
27	36	Bernadeta Bocek	Poland	1:33	29:14.3	+3:20.6
28	19	Vida Vencienė	Lithuania	0:54	29:19.1	+3:25.4
29	25	Nancy Fiddler	United States	1:05	29:24.9	+3:31.2
30	35	Karin Säterkvist	Sweden	1:30	29:27.6	+3:33.9
31	49	Sophie Villeneuve	France	2:01	29:28.5	+3:34.8
32	45	Sylvie Giry-Rousset	France	1:52	29:46.3	+3:52.6
33	29	Tuulikki Pyykkönen	Finland	1:17	30:02.5	+4:08.8
34	48	Naomi Hoshikawa	Japan	1:59	30:10.8	+4:17.1
35	33	Ann-Marie Karlsson	Sweden	1:30	30:14.1	+4:20.4
36	44	Elvira Knecht	Switzerland	1:51	30:17.2	+4:23.5
37	20	Brigitte Albrecht	Switzerland	0:55	30:28.8	+4:35.1
38	42	Manuela Oschmann	Germany	1:47	30:52.5	+4:58.8
39	46	Lucy Steele	Canada	1:54	30:57.4	+5:03.7
40	41	Rhonda DeLong	Canada	1:45	31:01.8	+5:08.1
41	52	Leslie Thompson	United States	2:14	31:05.1	+5:11.4
42	32	Barbara Mettler	Switzerland	1:19	31:16.3	+5:22.6
43	43	Miwa Ota	Japan	1:49	31:17.3	+5:23.6
44	55	Halina Nowak-Guńka	Poland	2:42	31:18.4	+5:24.7
45	38	Piret Niglas	Estonia	1:41	31:36.6	+5:42.9
46	37	Marie-Pierre Guilbaud	France	1:39	31:41.3	+5:47.6
47	54	Yumi Inomata	Japan	2:35	31:58.6	+6:04.9
48	47	Ingrid Butts	United States	1:54	31:59.7	+6:06.0
49	53	Jane Vincent	Canada	2:33	32:10.7	+6:17.0
50	50	Reneta Bancheva	Bulgaria	2:02	32:28.3	+6:34.6
51	39	Angela Schmidt-Foster	Canada	1:42	32:30.1	+6:36.4
52	56	Nina Kemppel	United States	2:59	33:56.7	+8:03.0
53	51	Li Gyong-Hui	North Korea	2:12	33:58.8	+8:05.1
54	59	Anna Bozsik	Hungary	4:15	36:39.8	+10:46.1
55	57	Gong Guiping	China	3:34	36:46.2	+10:52.5
56	58	Wang Yan	China	3:43	38:30.3	+12:36.6
57	60	Ines Alder	Argentina	4:17	39:41.4	+13:47.7
58	62	Jenny Palacios-Stillo	Honduras	9:07	48:49.6	+22:55.9
DNS	21	Trude Dybendahl	Norway	0:57	Did not start	
DNS	31	Marja-Liisa Kirvesniemi	Finland	1:20	Did not start	
DNS	40	Małgorzata Ruchała	Poland	1:43	Did not start	
DNS	61	Li Gyong-Ae	North Korea	4:41	Did not start	
