= Andrzej Piotrowski =

Andrzej Piotrowski may refer to:

- Andrzej Piotrowski (skier) (born 1969), Polish cross-country skier
- Andrzej Piotrowski (weightlifter) (born 1958), Polish weightlifter
