= Michalina Maciuszek =

Polish cross-country skier

Personal information
- Nationality: Poland
- Born: 16 September 1963 (age 62) Moszczenica Wyżna, Poland

Sport
- Sport: Skiing

World Cup career
- Seasons: 3 – (1984, 1993–1994)
- Indiv. starts: 7
- Indiv. podiums: 0
- Team starts: 1
- Team podiums: 0
- Overall titles: 0 – (66th in 1984, 1994)

Michalina Stanisława Maciuszek (born 16 September 1963 in Moszczenica Wyżna) is a Polish former cross-country skier who competed from 1983 to 1994. At the 1994 Winter Olympics in Lillehammer, she had her best career finish of eighth in the 4 × 5 km relay and her best individual finish of 31st in the 30 km event.

Maciusek's best World Cup finish was 27th in a 15 km event in Italy in 1993. Her best individual career finish was sixth in 5 km FIS race in Poland in 1994.

== Cross-country skiing results ==
All results are sourced from the International Ski Federation (FIS).

=== Olympic Games ===
Year	Age	5 km	15 km	Pursuit	30 km	4 × 5 km relay
1994	30	—	40	—	31	8

=== World Cup ===
==== Season standings ====
Season	Age	Overall
1984	20	66
1993	29	NC
1994	30	66
