= Sylvie Giry-Rousset =

French cross-country skier (born 1965)

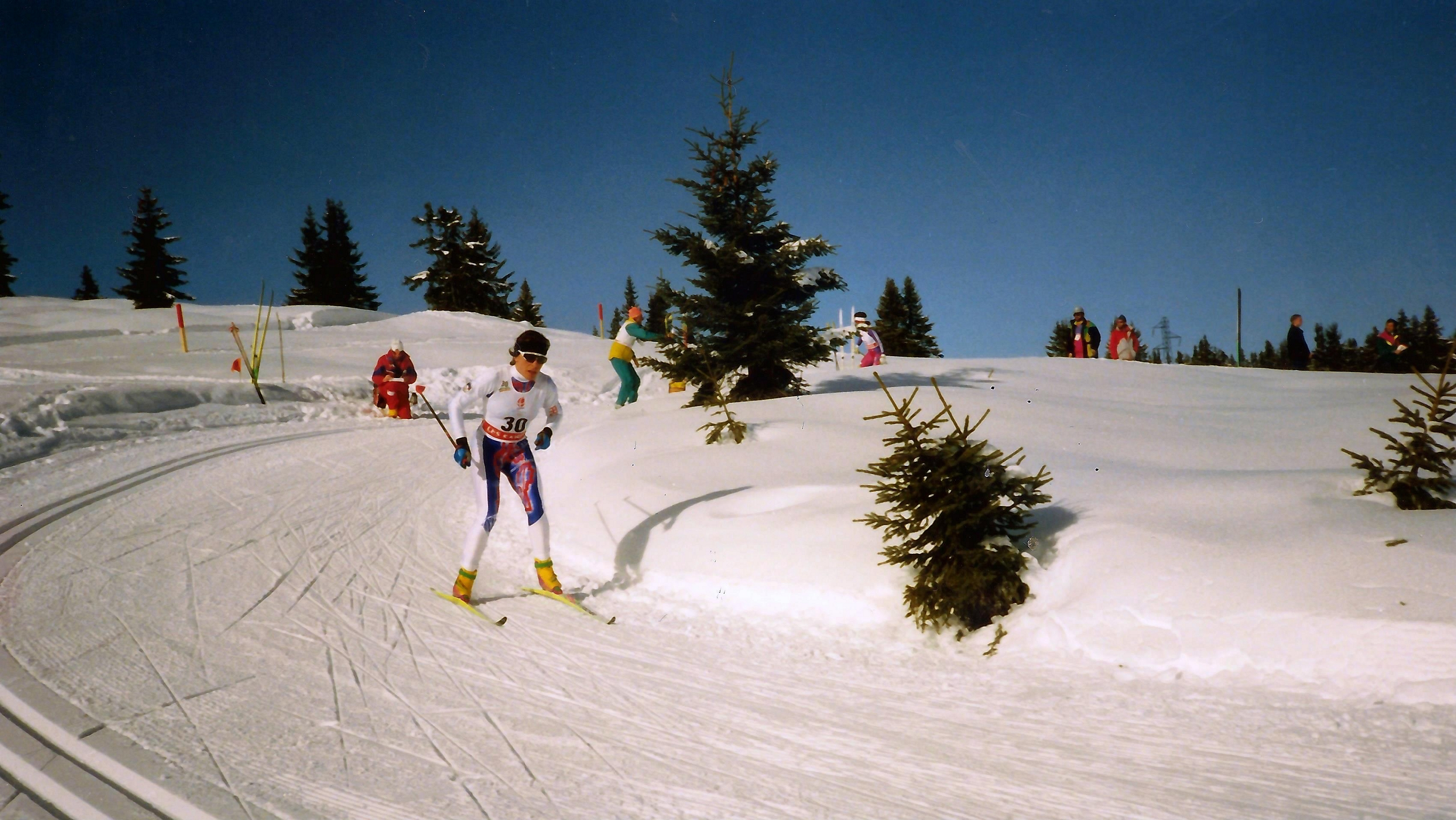

Personal information
- Nationality: France
- Born: 21 July 1965 (age 61) Grenoble, France

Sport
- Sport: Skiing

World Cup career
- Seasons: 4 – (1991–1994)
- Indiv. starts: 29
- Indiv. podiums: 0
- Team starts: 3
- Team podiums: 0
- Overall titles: 0 – (73rd in 1993)

Sylvie Giry-Rousset (born 21 July 1965) is a French cross-country skier who competed at a high level from 1992 to 1994.

Rousset was born in Grenoble, Isère. Competing in two Winter Olympics, she earned her best results at the 1992 Games in Albertville with a fifth in the 4 × 5 km relay and 28th in the 15 km event.

Giry Rousset's best finish at the FIS Nordic World Ski Championships was 37th in the 15 km event at Falun in 1993. Her best World Cup finish as 29th twice in 1992.

== Cross-country skiing results ==
All results are sourced from the International Ski Federation (FIS).

=== Olympic Games ===
Year	Age	5 km	15 km	Pursuit	30 km	4 × 5 km relay
1992	26	45	28	32	39	5
1994	28	—	DNF	—	50	11

=== World Championships ===
Year	Age	5 km	10 km	15 km	Pursuit	30 km	4 × 5 km relay
1991	25	34	27	39	—N/a	37	9
1993	27	49	—N/a	37	42	—	9

=== World Cup ===
==== Season standings ====
Season	Age	Overall
1991	25	NC
1992	26	NC
1993	27	73
1994	28	NC
