= Marcelo Vásquez =

Argentine biathlete (born 1971)

Personal information
- Nationality: Argentine
- Born: 6 August 1971 (age 53)

Sport
- Sport: Biathlon

Marcelo Vásquez (born 6 August 1971) is an Argentine biathlete. He competed in the men's 20 km individual event at the 1992 Winter Olympics.
