= Seppo Suhonen =

Finnish biathlete

Personal information
- Nationality: Finnish
- Born: 26 April 1967 (age 57); Lieksa, Finland

Sport
- Sport: Biathlon

Seppo Suhonen (born 26 April 1967) is a Finnish biathlete. He competed in the men's 20 km individual event at the 1992 Winter Olympics.
