= Heike Wezel =

German cross-country skier (born 1968)

Personal information
- Nationality: Germany
- Born: 19 October 1968 (age 57) Klingenthal, East Germany

Sport
- Sport: Skiing
- Club: SV Klingenthal

World Cup career
- Seasons: 5 – (1990–1994)
- Indiv. starts: 23
- Indiv. podiums: 0
- Team starts: 4
- Team podiums: 0
- Overall titles: 0 – (24th in 1990)
Medal record
Women's cross-country skiing
Representing East Germany
Junior World Championships
Gold medal – first place	1988 Saalfelden	3 × 5 km relay
Silver medal – second place	1987 Asiago	3 × 5 km relay
Silver medal – second place	1988 Saalfelden	15 km freestyle

Heike Wezel (born 19 October 1968) is a former German cross-country skier who competed from 1990 to 1994. Competing at the 1992 Winter Olympics in Albertville, she had her best career finish of eighth in the 4 × 5 km relay and her best individual finish of 17th in the 5 km event.

At the 1993 FIS Nordic World Ski Championships in Falun, her best individual finish was 39th in the 15 km event. Her best World Cup career finish was fourth in a 10 km event in Norway in 1990.

Wezel best individual career finish was second in a 5 km FIS race in Sweden in 1993.

== Cross-country skiing results ==
All results are sourced from the International Ski Federation (FIS).

=== Olympic Games ===
Year	Age	5 km	15 km	Pursuit	30 km	4 × 5 km relay
1992	23	17	19	25	32	8

=== World Championships ===
Year	Age	5 km	10 km	15 km	Pursuit	30 km	4 × 5 km relay
1991	22	36	—	17	—N/a	—	5
1993	24	54	—N/a	39	DNS	43	10

=== World Cup ===
==== Season standings ====
Season	Age	Overall
1990	22	24
1991	23	25
1992	24	NC
1993	25	NC
1994	26	NC
