= Cross-country skiing at the 1992 Winter Olympics – Women's 30 kilometre freestyle =

Women's 30 kilometre freestyle at the XVI Olympic Winter Games
- Venue: Les Saisies
- Dates: 21 February 1992
- Competitors: 57 from 19 nations
- Winning time: 1:22:30.1

Medalists
1st place, gold medalist(s)		Stefania Belmondo; Italy
2nd place, silver medalist(s)		Lyubov Yegorova; Unified Team
3rd place, bronze medalist(s)		Yelena Välbe; Unified Team

The women's 30 kilometre freestyle cross-country skiing competition at the 1992 Winter Olympics in Albertville, France, was held on Friday 21 February at Les Saisies.

== Results ==
The results:

Rank	Bib	Name	Country	Time	Deficit
1st place, gold medalist(s)	50	Stefania Belmondo	Italy	1:22:30.1	–
2nd place, silver medalist(s)	57	Lyubov Yegorova	Unified Team	1:22:52.0	+21.9
3rd place, bronze medalist(s)	33	Yelena Välbe	Unified Team	1:24:13.9	+1:43.8
4	53	Elin Nilsen	Norway	1:26:25.1	+3:55.0
5	24	Larisa Lazutina	Unified Team	1:26:31.8	+4:01.7
6	35	Manuela Di Centa	Italy	1:27:04.4	+4:34.3
7	52	Marie-Helene Westin	Sweden	1:27:16.2	+4:46.1
8	45	Simone Opitz	Germany	1:27:17.4	+4:47.3
9	34	Trude Dybendahl	Norway	1:27:29.8	+4:59.7
10	40	Marjut Lukkarinen	Finland	1:27:30.9	+5:00.8
11	56	Alžběta Havrančíková	Czechoslovakia	1:27:54.9	+5:24.8
12	29	Gabriella Paruzzi	Italy	1:28:18.1	+5:48.0
13	16	Inger Helene Nybråten	Norway	1:28:21.8	+5:51.7
14	15	Inger Lise Hegge	Norway	1:29:31.6	+7:01.5
15	18	Gabriele Hess	Germany	1:29:43.8	+7:13.7
16	42	Vida Vencienė	Lithuania	1:29:45.4	+7:15.3
17	44	Brigitte Albrecht	Switzerland	1:29:54.3	+7:24.2
18	41	Sophie Villeneuve	France	1:30:14.5	+7:44.4
19	54	Sylvia Honegger	Switzerland	1:30:16.6	+7:46.5
20	4	Olga Danilova	Unified Team	1:30:30.7	+8:00.6
21	48	Isabelle Mancini	France	1:31:03.3	+8:33.2
22	17	Iveta Zelingerová	Czechoslovakia	1:31:39.1	+9:09.0
23	51	Bernadeta Bocek	Poland	1:31:44.3	+9:14.2
24	31	Małgorzata Ruchała	Poland	1:31:47.6	+9:17.5
25	19	Halina Nowak-Guńka	Poland	1:31:56.2	+9:26.1
26	2	Elvira Knecht	Switzerland	1:32:35.6	+10:05.5
27	3	Anna Janoušková	Czechoslovakia	1:32:43.9	+10:13.8
28	55	Jaana Savolainen	Finland	1:32:49.4	+10:19.3
29	39	Nancy Fiddler	United States	1:33:02.5	+10:32.4
30	43	Zora Simčáková	Czechoslovakia	1:33:10.3	+10:40.2
31	20	Natascia Leonardi	Switzerland	1:33:21.0	+10:50.9
32	13	Heike Wezel	Germany	1:33:34.2	+11:04.1
33	38	Lucy Steele	Canada	1:33:35.7	+11:05.6
34	32	Magdalena Wallin	Sweden	1:33:46.6	+11:16.5
35	7	Laura Bettega	Italy	1:33:49.3	+11:19.2
36	23	Sirpa Ryhänen	Finland	1:33:55.7	+11:25.6
37	6	Päivi Simukka	Finland	1:34:21.7	+11:51.6
38	21	Ann-Marie Karlsson	Sweden	1:34:45.6	+12:15.5
39	30	Sylvie Giry-Rousset	France	1:35:08.4	+12:38.3
40	47	Jane Vincent	Canada	1:35:10.0	+12:39.9
41	25	Miwa Ota	Japan	1:35:19.4	+12:49.3
42	8	Naomi Hoshikawa	Japan	1:35:29.4	+12:59.3
43	49	Betsy Youngman	United States	1:36:12.1	+13:42.0
44	36	Fumiko Aoki	Japan	1:36:21.9	+13:51.8
46	5	Dorcas Denhartog-Wonsavage	United States	1:36:39.8	+14:09.7
47	46	Ina Kümmel	Germany	1:36:48.2	+14:18.1
47	14	Lis Frost	Sweden	1:37:05.0	+14:34.9
48	37	Piret Niglas	Estonia	1:37:31.8	+15:01.7
49	26	Brenda White	United States	1:37:54.0	+15:23.9
50	11	Ileana Ianoşiu-Hangan	Romania	1:38:06.7	+15:36.6
51	28	Lorna Sasseville	Canada	1:38:27.3	+15:57.2
52	27	Reneta Bancheva	Bulgaria	1:41:44.9	+19:14.8
53	22	Gong Guiping	China	1:43:08.2	+20:38.1
54	12	Wang Yan	China	1:49:08.5	+26:38.4
55	10	Ines Alder	Argentina	1:50:50.6	+28:20.5
	1	Katarzyna Popieluch	Poland	DNF	
	9	Marie-Pierre Guilbaud	France	DNF	
