= Kristjan Oja =

Estonian biathlete (born 1968)

Personal information
- Nationality: Estonian
- Born: 8 August 1968 (age 57) Tallinn, then part of Estonian SSR, Soviet Union

Sport
- Sport: Biathlon

Kristjan Oja (born 8 August 1968) is an Estonian former biathlete. He competed in the men's 20 km individual event at the 1992 Winter Olympics. His daughter is biathlete Regina Ermits.
