= Martin Rypl =

Czech biathlete (born 1967)

Personal information
- Nationality: Czech
- Born: 14 September 1967 (age 57)

Sport
- Sport: Biathlon

Martin Rypl (born 14 September 1967) is a Czech biathlete. He competed in the men's 20 km individual event at the 1992 Winter Olympics.
