= Jakub Malczewski =

Polish alpine skier (born 1974)

Personal information
- Nationality: Polish
- Born: 20 December 1974 (age 50); Zakopane, Poland

Sport
- Sport: Alpine skiing

Jakub Malczewski (born 20 December 1974) is a Polish alpine skier. He competed in three events at the 1992 Winter Olympics.
