= Dariusz Kozłowski =

Polish biathlete (born 1968)

Personal information
- Nationality: Polish
- Born: 24 February 1968 (age 57); Wałbrzych, Poland

Sport
- Sport: Biathlon

Dariusz Kozłowski (born 24 February 1968) is a Polish biathlete. He competed in the men's 20 km individual event at the 1992 Winter Olympics.
