= Brenda White =

American cross-country skier (born 1966)

Personal information
- Born: February 4, 1966 (age 59); Burlington, Vermont, United States

Sport
- Sport: Cross-country skiing

Brenda White (born February 4, 1966) is an American cross-country skier. She competed in the women's 15 kilometre classical event at the 1992 Winter Olympics.
