= Artur Szafrański =

Polish speed skater

Personal information
- Nationality: Polish
- Born: 25 October 1971 (age 53); Elbląg, Poland

Sport
- Sport: Speed skating

Artur Szafrański (born 25 October 1971) is a Polish speed skater. He competed in the men's 1500 metres event at the 1994 Winter Olympics.
