= Gabriela Sůvová =

Czech biathlete (born 1972)

Personal information
- Nationality: Czech
- Born: 8 February 1972 (age 53); Jablonec nad Nisou, Czechoslovakia

Sport
- Sport: Biathlon

Gabriela Sůvová (born 8 February 1972) is a Czech biathlete. She competed at the 1992 Winter Olympics and the 1994 Winter Olympics.
