= Zbigniew Filip =

Polish biathlete (born 1970)

Personal information
- Full name: Zbigniew Wojciech Filip
- Born: 17 February 1970 (age 55); Wałbrzych, Poland
- Height: 183 cm (6 ft 0 in)
- Weight: 71 kg (157 lb)

Sport
- Sport: Biathlon
- Club: Górnik Wałbrzych

Zbigniew Wojciech Filip (born 17 February 1970) is a Polish biathlete. He competed in the men's 20 km individual event at the 1992 Winter Olympics.
