= Tomasz Świst =

Polish speed skater

Personal information
- Nationality: Polish
- Born: 23 December 1974 (age 50); Nowy Targ, Poland

Sport
- Sport: Speed skating

Tomasz Świst (born 23 December 1974) is a Polish speed skater. He was born in Nowy Targ. He competed at the 1998 Winter Olympics in Nagano, and at the 2002 Winter Olympics in Salt Lake City, both times in 500 metres and 1,000 metres.
