= Li Gyong-ae =

North Korean cross-country skier

Personal information
- Born: August 25, 1976 (age 48); North Korea

Li Gyong-ae (born 25 August 1976) is a North Korean cross-country skier who competed in the women's 5 km race at the 1992 Winter Olympics in Albertville, France. She placed 61st overall, finishing the race with a time of 18:54.1. This would be her only Olympic appearance.
