= Adrian Przechewka =

Polish luger (born 1972)

Personal information
- Nationality: Polish
- Born: 30 September 1972 (age 52); Wrocław, Poland

Sport
- Sport: Luge

Adrian Przechewka (born 30 September 1972) is a Polish luger. He competed at the 1992 Winter Olympics and the 1994 Winter Olympics.
