= Jaromir Radke =

Polish speed skater

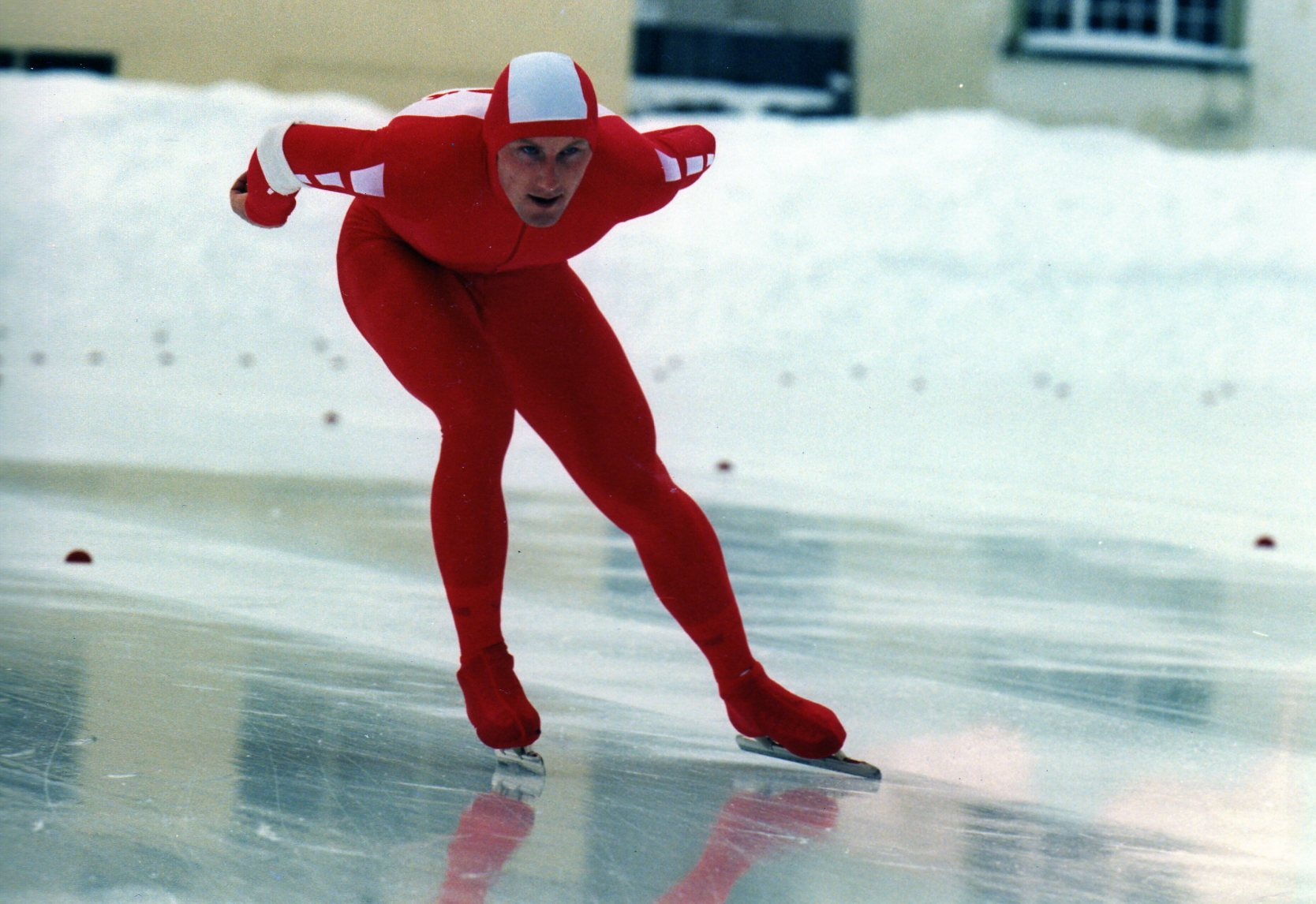

Personal information
- Nationality: Polish
- Born: 28 May 1969 (age 55); Tomaszów Mazowiecki, Poland

Sport
- Sport: Speed skating

Jaromir Radke (born 28 May 1969) is a Polish speed skater. He competed at the 1992 Winter Olympics and the 1994 Winter Olympics.
