= Jenny Palacios-Stillo =

Honduran cross-country skier (born 1960)

Jenny Victoria Palacios-Stillo (born 21 April 1960) is a Honduran cross-country skier. She represented her country at the 1992 Winter Olympics in Albertville, where she competed in three events: the women's 5 kilometre, women's 15 kilometre and the women's 10 kilometre freestyle pursuit. In each case, she was the last competitor to complete the course; however, since Jenny did in fact finish each event, she finished ahead of the skiers who did not, and thus avoided coming in dead last.

As of 2024, Palacios-Stillo is the only Honduran to compete at a Winter Olympics.
