= Krystyna Liberda-Stawarska =

Polish biathlete (born 1968)

Personal information
- Nationality: Polish
- Born: 7 March 1968 (age 57); Niedźwiedź, Poland

Sport
- Sport: Biathlon

Krystyna Liberda-Stawarska (born 7 March 1968) is a Polish biathlete. She competed in two events at the 1992 Winter Olympics.
