= Halina Nowak-Guńka =

Polish skier (born 1970)

Personal information
- Nationality: Poland
- Born: 1 June 1970 (age 56) Rabka-Zdrój, Poland

Sport
- Sport: Skiing

World Cup career
- Seasons: 4 – (1989, 1992–1994)
- Indiv. starts: 10
- Indiv. podiums: 0
- Team starts: 3
- Team podiums: 0
- Overall titles: 0 – (63rd in 1994)

Halina Jolanta Nowak-Guńka (born 1 June 1970) is a Polish biathlete and cross-country skier. She competed in the biathlon at the 1998 Winter Olympics and the cross-country skiing at the 1992 Winter Olympics and the 1994 Winter Olympics.

== Cross-country skiing results ==
All results are sourced from the International Ski Federation (FIS).

=== Olympic Games ===
| Year | Age | 5 km | 15 km | Pursuit | 30 km | 4 × 5 km relay |
|---|---|---|---|---|---|---|
| 1992 | 21 | 55 | — | 44 | 25 | 10 |
| 1994 | 23 | 58 | 25 | DNS | — | — |

=== World Championships ===
| Year | Age | 5 km | 10 km classical | 10 km freestyle | 15 km | Pursuit | 30 km | 4 × 5 km relay |
|---|---|---|---|---|---|---|---|---|
| 1989 | 18 | —N/a | — | 45 | — | —N/a | — | 12 |
| 1991 | 20 | — | —N/a | 46 | — | —N/a | 44 | 7 |
| 1993 | 22 | 50 | —N/a | —N/a | — | 35 | DNF | 11 |

=== World Cup ===
==== Season standings ====
| Season | Age | Overall |
|---|---|---|
| 1989 | 18 | NC |
| 1992 | 21 | NC |
| 1993 | 22 | NC |
| 1994 | 23 | 63 |
