= Cross-country skiing at the 1992 Winter Olympics – Women's 5 kilometre classical =

Cross-country skiing at the Olympics

Women's 5km at the XVI Olympic Winter Games
- Cross-country skiing
- Venue: Les Saisies
- Date: 13 February 1992
- Competitors: 62 from 21 nations
- Winning time: 14:13.8

Medalists
1st place, gold medalist(s)		Marjut Lukkarinen; Finland
2nd place, silver medalist(s)		Lyubov Yegorova; Unified Team
3rd place, bronze medalist(s)		Yelena Välbe; Unified Team

The Women's 5 kilometre cross-country skiing event was part of the cross-country skiing programme at the 1992 Winter Olympics, in Albertville, France. It was the eighth appearance of the event. The competition was held on 13 February 1992, at Les Saisies.

== Results ==
Rank	Bib	Name	Country	Time
1st place, gold medalist(s)	60	Marjut Lukkarinen	Finland	14:13.8
2nd place, silver medalist(s)	62	Lyubov Yegorova	Unified Team	14:14.7
3rd place, bronze medalist(s)	48	Yelena Välbe	Unified Team	14:22.7
4	54	Stefania Belmondo	Italy	14:26.2
5	51	Inger Helene Nybråten	Norway	14:33.3
6	17	Olga Danilova	Unified Team	14:37.2
7	2	Larisa Lazutina	Unified Team	14:41.7
8	8	Solveig Pedersen	Norway	14:42.1
9	53	Marie-Helene Westin	Sweden	14:42.6
10	28	Elin Nilsen	Norway	14:50.8
11	49	Ľubomíra Balážová	Czechoslovakia	14:54.6
12	39	Manuela Di Centa	Italy	14:55.4
13	59	Kateřina Neumannová	Czechoslovakia	14:59.1
14	38	Carina Görlin	Sweden	15:00.8
15	57	Sylvia Honegger	Switzerland	15:03.4
16	10	Gabriele Heß	Germany	15:03.7
17	35	Heike Wezel	Germany	15:04.1
18	30	Iveta Zelingerová-Fortová	Czechoslovakia	15:06.4
19	58	Vida Vencienė	Lithuania	15:08.7
20	40	Brigitte Albrecht	Switzerland	15:09.5
21	47	Trude Dybendahl-Hartz	Norway	15:10.8
22	55	Isabelle Mancini	France	15:12.1
23	16	Gabriella Paruzzi	Italy	15:13.9
24	34	Dorota Kwaśny	Poland	15:16.5
25	52	Nancy Fiddler	United States	15:19.2
26	3	Jaana Savolainen	Finland	15:19.9
27	19	Simone Opitz	Germany	15:24.9
28	23	Bice Vanzetta	Italy	15:28.4
29	22	Tuulikki Pyykkönen	Finland	15:31.1
30	63	Fumiko Aoki	Japan	15:33.0
31	45	Marja-Liisa Kirvesniemi	Finland	15:33.2
32	25	Barbara Mettler	Switzerland	15:33.7
33	32	Ann-Marie Karlsson	Sweden	15:43.8
34	11	Karin Säterkvist	Sweden	15:44.6
	14	Alžbeta Havrančíková	Czechoslovakia	15:44.6
36	33	Bernadetta Bocek-Piotrowska	Poland	15:47.4
37	15	Marie-Pierre Guilbaud	France	15:53.6
38	37	Piret Niglas	Estonia	15:54.9
39	56	Angela Schmidt-Foster	Canada	15:56.0
40	50	Małgorzata Ruchała	Poland	15:57.9
41	46	Rhonda DeLong	Canada	15:59.4
42	61	Manuela Oschmann	Germany	16:01.7
43	36	Miwa Ota	Japan	16:03.1
44	6	Elvira Knecht	Switzerland	16:05.5
45	24	Sylvie Giry-Rousset	France	16:06.6
46	31	Lucy Steele	Canada	16:07.8
47	26	Ingrid Butts	United States	16:07.9
48	29	Naomi Hoshikawa	Japan	16:13.2
49	43	Sophie Villeneuve	France	16:15.0
50	42	Reneta Bancheva	Bulgaria	16:16.0
51	18	Li Gyong-hui	North Korea	16:26.7
52	12	Leslie Thompson	United States	16:27.8
53	5	Jane Vincent	Canada	16:47.6
54	1	Yumi Inomata	Japan	16:49.4
55	9	Halina Nowak-Guńka	Poland	16:56.1
56	41	Nina Kemppel	United States	17:12.9
57	20	Gong Guiping	China	17:48.0
58	13	Wang Yan	China	17:56.8
59	21	Anna Bozsik	Hungary	18:29.0
60	4	Inés Alder	Argentina	18:31.6
61	7	Li Gyong-ae	North Korea	18:54.1
62	44	Jenny Palacios-Stillo	Honduras	23:21.5
