= Leszek Szarejko =

Polish luger (born 1972)

Personal information
- Nationality: Polish
- Born: 30 March 1972 (age 54) Augustów, Poland

Sport
- Sport: Luge

Leszek Szarejko (born 30 March 1972) is a Polish luger. He competed at the 1992 Winter Olympics and the 1994 Winter Olympics.
