= Helena Mikołajczyk =

Polish biathlete (born 1968)

Personal information
- Nationality: Polish
- Born: 22 May 1968 (age 56); Mszana Dolna, Poland

Sport
- Sport: Biathlon

Helena Mikołajczyk (born 22 May 1968) is a Polish biathlete. She competed in two events at the 1994 Winter Olympics.
