= Marcin Szafrański =

Polish alpine skier (born 1971)

Personal information
- Nationality: Polish
- Born: 6 May 1971 (age 54); Bielsko-Biała, Poland

Sport
- Sport: Alpine skiing

Marcin Szafrański (born 6 May 1971) is a Polish alpine skier. He competed at the 1992 Winter Olympics and the 1994 Winter Olympics.
