= Anna Rechnio =

Polish figure skater

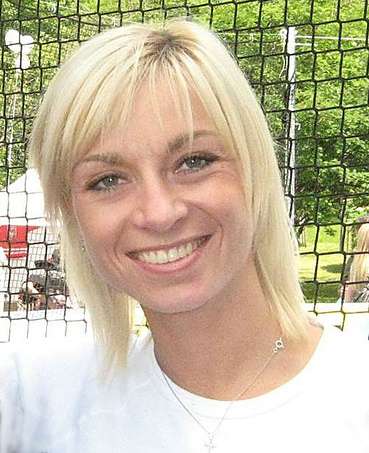
- Rechnio in 2009

Personal information
- Full name: Anna Elżbieta Rechnio
- Other names: Anna Rechnio-Fiedosiejew (married name)
- Born: 11 December 1977 (age 48) Warsaw, Poland
- Height: 1.65 m (5 ft 5 in)

Figure skating career
- Country: Poland
- Retired: 2000

Anna Elżbieta Rechnio (Polish pronunciation: [ˈanna ˈrɛxɲɔ]; born 11 December 1977) is a Polish former competitive figure skater. She is a three-time Polish national champion who competed at two Winter Olympics.

== Personal life ==
Anna Elżbieta Rechnio was born 11 December 1977 in Warsaw.She is married to a former Russian skater; Alexei Fedoseev. They have a daughter; Maria (born 2010).

== Career ==
Rechnio began skating in 1984. Early in her career, she was coached by Barbara Kossowska and Anna Hunkiewicz.

In the 1993–94 season, Rechnio won her first senior national title. In January 1994, she placed 7th at the European Championships in Copenhagen, Denmark. The following month, she competed at her first Winter Olympics. Ranked ninth in the short program and 12th in the free skate, she finished tenth overall in Lillehammer, Norway. Concluding her season, she finished 15th in March at the 1994 World Championships in Chiba, Japan, having ranked 7th in her qualifying group, 9th in the short, and 17th in the free.

Rechnio also won the Polish Figure Skating Championships in 1997 and 1998. She placed 19th at the 1998 Winter Olympics in Nagano, Japan.

Rechnio competed at five World Championships, achieving her highest placement, 5th, in 1998. She also competed at six European Championships — her best placement was 7th in 1994.

In the 1999–2000 season, Rechnio was coached by Miroslawa Brajczewska in Warsaw. After retiring from competition, she began working as a coach.

== Programs ==
Season	Short program	Free skating
1999–2000		Gypsy Flame by Armic

== Results ==
GP: Champions Series / Grand Prix

International
Event	90–91	91–92	92–93	93–94	94–95	95–96	96–97	97–98	98–99	99–00
Olympics				10th				19th		
Worlds				15th	14th			5th	6th	16th
Europeans			15th	7th	9th	12th	13th			13th
GP Skate America									6th	
GP Skate Canada										7th
GP Cup of Russia								5th	6th	
Trophée de France					8th					
Nebelhorn Trophy						9th	14th			
Piruetten				14th			3rd			
Prague Skate			10th							
Schäfer Memorial							2nd			
Skate Israel										3rd
Goodwill Games									8th	
International: Junior
Junior Worlds		17th	6th	7th						
Blue Swords		1st J								
Piruetten	1st J	7th J								
National
Polish Champ.		2nd	2nd	1st	2nd	2nd	1st	1st	2nd	2nd
J: Junior level; WD: Withdrew
