= Paweł Jaroszek =

Polish speed skater (born 1972)

Personal information
- Nationality: Polish
- Born: 7 January 1972 (age 53); Pionki, Poland

Sport
- Sport: Speed skating

Paweł Jaroszek (born 7 January 1972) is a Polish speed skater. He competed at the 1992 Winter Olympics and the 1994 Winter Olympics.
