= Jan Wojtas =

Polish biathlete (born 1966)

Personal information
- Nationality: Polish
- Born: 26 November 1966 (age 58); Kamienna Góra, Poland

Sport
- Sport: Biathlon

Jan Wojtas (born 26 November 1966) is a Polish biathlete. He competed at the 1992 Winter Olympics and the 1994 Winter Olympics.
