= Dorota Kwaśna =

Polish cross-country skier

Personal information
- Nationality: Poland
- Born: 11 September 1972 (age 53) Bielsko-Biała, Poland

Sport
- Sport: Skiing
- Club: BBTS Włókniarz Bielsko-Biała

World Cup career
- Seasons: 10 – (1992–1998, 2000–2002)
- Indiv. starts: 70
- Indiv. podiums: 0
- Team starts: 9
- Team podiums: 0
- Overall titles: 0 – (45th in 1993)
- Discipline titles: 0

Dorota Kwaśna (born 11 September 1972) is a Polish former cross-country skier who competed from 1992 to 2002. Competing in three Winter Olympics, she earned her best career finish of eighth in the 4 × 5 km relay at Lillehammer in 1994 and her best individual finish of 21st in the 5 km + 10 km combined pursuit.

Kwaśna's best finish at the FIS Nordic World Ski Championships was 17th twice (1993: 30 km, 1995: 5 km + 10 km combined pursuit). Her best World Cup finish was 17th in an individual sprint event in Germany in 1996.

Kwaśna's best career finish was third in four FIS races at distances up to 10 km from 1997 to 2001.

== Cross-country skiing results ==
All results are sourced from the International Ski Federation (FIS).

=== Olympic Games ===
Year	Age	5 km	15 km	Pursuit	30 km	4 × 5 km relay
1992	19	24	35	21	—	10
1994	21	38	22	28	DNF	8
1998	25	61	50	49	DNF	13

=== World Championships ===
Year	Age	5 km	10 km	15 km	Pursuit	30 km	Sprint	4 × 5 km relay
1991	18	41	—	35	—N/a	—	—N/a	—
1993	20	39	—N/a	33	27	17	—N/a	11
1995	22	18	—N/a	37	17	28	—N/a	—
1997	24	51	—N/a	27	38	DNF	—N/a	13
2001	28	—N/a	41	33	16	CNX^{[a]}	—	—

a. ^{1} Cancelled due to extremely cold weather.

=== World Cup ===
==== Season standings ====
Season	Age				
Season	Age	Overall	Long Distance	Middle Distance	Sprint
1992	19	NC	—N/a	—N/a	—N/a
1993	20	45	—N/a	—N/a	—N/a
1994	21	51	—N/a	—N/a	—N/a
1995	22	47	—N/a	—N/a	—N/a
1996	23	60	—N/a	—N/a	—N/a
1997	24	64	NC	—N/a	54
1998	25	NC	NC	—N/a	—
2000	27	NC	NC	NC	NC
2001	28	105	—N/a	—N/a	NC
2002	29	NC	—N/a	—N/a	NC
