= Krzysztof Sosna =

Polish biathlete (born 1969)

Personal information
- Nationality: Polish
- Born: 11 October 1969 (age 55); Wodzisław Śląski, Poland

Sport
- Sport: Biathlon

Krzysztof Sosna (born 11 October 1969) is a Polish biathlete. He competed in the men's 20 km individual event at the 1992 Winter Olympics.
