= Paweł Abratkiewicz =

Polish speed skater (born 1970)

Personal information
- Nationality: Polish
- Born: 10 June 1970 (age 54); Opoczno, Poland

Sport
- Sport: Speed skating

Paweł Abratkiewicz (born 10 June 1970) is a Polish speed skater. He was born in Opoczno. He competed at the 1992 Winter Olympics, 1998 Winter Olympics, and 2002 Winter Olympics, in 500 metres and 1,000 metres.
