= Halina Pitoń =

Polish biathlete (born 1972)

Personal information
- Nationality: Polish
- Born: 26 September 1972 (age 52); Kościelisko, Poland

Sport
- Sport: Biathlon

Halina Pitoń (born 26 September 1972) is a Polish biathlete. She competed at the 1992, 1994 and the 1998 Winter Olympics. She is married to Polish Olympic biathlete Wojciech Kozub. She also won gold in the 15km event at the 1995 Biathlon European Championships.
