= Anna Bozsik =

Hungarian biathlete (born 1965)

Personal information
- Nationality: Hungarian
- Born: 31 October 1965 (age 59)

Sport
- Sport: Biathlon

Anna Bozsik (born 31 October 1965) is a Hungarian biathlete. She competed at the 1992, 1994 and the 1998 Winter Olympics. She also competed in three cross-country skiing events at the 1992 Winter Olympics.
