= Agata Suszka =

Polish biathlete (born 1971)

Personal information
- Full name: Agata Katarzyna Suszka
- Nationality: Polish
- Born: 27 September 1971 (age 53); Istebna, Poland

Sport
- Sport: Biathlon

Agata Katarzyna Suszka (born 27 September 1971) is a Polish biathlete. She competed at the 1992, 1994 and the 1998 Winter Olympics.
