= Stanisław Ustupski =

Polish Nordic combined skier

Stanisław Ustupski (born 15 November 1966 in Zakopane) was a Polish Nordic combined skier who competed from 1989 to 1994. He finished eighth in the 15 km individual event at the 1992 Winter Olympics in Albertville. At the 1994 Winter Olympics in Lillehammer he was 21.

Ustupski's only career victory was in a 15 km individual World Cup B event in Poland in 1992.
