= Zofia Kiełpińska =

Polish biathlete (born 1960)

Personal information
- Nationality: Polish
- Born: 15 May 1960 (age 64); Zakopane, Poland

Sport
- Sport: Biathlon

Zofia Kiełpińska (born 15 May 1960 as Topór-Huciańska) is a Polish biathlete. She competed at the 1992 Winter Olympics and the 1994 Winter Olympics. She works in Zakopane Council.
