= Bernadeta Bocek-Piotrowska =

Polish cross-country skier

Personal information
- Nationality: Poland
- Born: 11 March 1970 (age 56) Istebna, Polish People's Republic

Sport
- Sport: Skiing
- Club: BBTS Bielsko-Biała

World Cup career
- Seasons: 1989, 1992–1994, 1996–1998
- Indiv. starts: 41
- Indiv. podiums: 0
- Team starts: 9
- Team podiums: 0
- Overall titles: 0 – (38th in 1993)
- Discipline titles: 0

Bernadeta Maria Bocek-Piotrowska (born 11 March 1970 in Istebna) is a Polish former cross-country skier who competed in the early 1990s. In the Olympics she was competing in 5, 15 and 30 km races, the 5 + 10 km pursuit and the 4 × 5 km relays. She took part in the 1992 Winter Olympics in Albertville with her best result being a 10th rank in women's 4 × 5 km relay. She finished eighth in the 4 × 5 km relay at the 1994 Winter Olympics in Lillehammer. In 1993 she was seventh in the 30 km race during world championships in Falun. In the 1998 Winter Olympics in Nagano the 4 × 5 km relay team became 13th, which was her best result in this games.

== Cross-country skiing results ==
All results are sourced from the International Ski Federation (FIS).

=== Olympic Games ===
| Year | Age | 5 km | 15 km | Pursuit | 30 km | 4 × 5 km relay |
|---|---|---|---|---|---|---|
| 1992 | 21 | 36 | 24 | 27 | 23 | 10 |
| 1994 | 23 | 31 | 18 | 22 | 34 | 8 |
| 1998 | 27 | 39 | 33 | 43 | 33 | 13 |

=== World Championships ===
| Year | Age | 5 km | 10 km classical | 10 km freestyle | 15 km | Pursuit | 30 km | 4 × 5 km relay |
|---|---|---|---|---|---|---|---|---|
| 1989 | 18 | —N/a | — | 38 | — | —N/a | — | 12 |
| 1991 | 20 | 40 | —N/a | 29 | — | —N/a | 29 | 7 |
| 1993 | 22 | 23 | —N/a | —N/a | 31 | 23 | 7 | 11 |
| 1997 | 26 | 49 | —N/a | —N/a | 40 | 35 | 44 | 13 |

=== World Cup ===
==== Season standings ====
| Season | Age | | | |
| Season | Age | Overall | Long Distance | Sprint |
|---|---|---|---|---|
| 1989 | 19 | NC | —N/a | —N/a |
| 1992 | 22 | NC | —N/a | —N/a |
| 1993 | 23 | 38 | —N/a | —N/a |
| 1994 | 24 | 40 | —N/a | —N/a |
| 1996 | 26 | NC | —N/a | —N/a |
| 1997 | 27 | 52 | NC | 40 |
| 1998 | 28 | NC | NC | NC |
