= Naomi Hoshikawa =

Japanese cross-country skier (born 1969)

Personal information
- Nationality: Japanese
- Born: 3 June 1969 (age 55); Yamagata, Japan

Sport
- Sport: Cross-country skiing

Naomi Hoshikawa (星川 直美, Hoshikawa Naomi, born 3 June 1969) is a Japanese cross-country skier. She competed in five events at the 1992 Winter Olympics.

Hoshikawa debuted internationally for the first time at the 1990 Asian Winter Games in Sapporo. There she won the silver medal in the 15 km freestyle and the gold medal in the relay. In 1991, she became the Japanese 30 km champion.
