= Gong Guiping =

Chinese cross-country skier (born 1969)

Personal information
- Nationality: Chinese
- Born: 1 February 1969 (age 56)

Sport
- Sport: Cross-country skiing

Gong Guiping (born 1 February 1969) is a Chinese cross-country skier. She competed in four events at the 1992 Winter Olympics.
