= Reneta Bancheva =

Bulgarian cross-country skier (born 1968)

Personal information
- Nationality: Bulgarian
- Born: 19 September 1968 (age 56)

Sport
- Sport: Cross-country skiing

Reneta Bancheva (Bulgarian: Ренета Банчева; born 19 September 1968) is a Bulgarian cross-country skier. She competed in four events at the 1992 Winter Olympics.
