= Wang Yan (skier) =

Chinese cross-country skier

Wang Yan (Chinese: 王岩; pinyin: Wáng Yán, born 30 August 1974) is a former Chinese cross-country skier who competed in cross-country skiing at the 1992 Winter Olympics. She finished 58th in the 5 km classical race, 47th in the 15 km classical race, 54th in the 30 km freestyle race and 56th in the 10 km freestyle pursuit.
