= Miwa Ota =

Japanese cross-country skier (born 1968)

Personal information
- Nationality: Japanese
- Born: 13 December 1968 (age 56); Niigata, Japan

Sport
- Sport: Cross-country skiing

Miwa Ota (太田 美和, Ōta Miwa, born 13 December 1968) is a Japanese cross-country skier. She competed in five events at the 1992 Winter Olympics.
