= Małgorzata Ruchała =

Polish cross-country skier

Personal information
- Nationality: Poland
- Born: 21 January 1961 (age 65) Limanowa, Poland

Sport
- Sport: Skiing
- Club: WKS Zakopane

World Cup career
- Seasons: 9 – (1989, 1991–1998)
- Indiv. starts: 53
- Indiv. podiums: 0
- Team starts: 7
- Team podiums: 0
- Overall titles: 0 – (33rd in 1994)
- Discipline titles: 0

Małgorzata Jasica-Ruchała (born 21 January 1961 in Limanowa) is a Polish cross-country skier who competed from 1991 to 1998. Competing in three Winter Olympics, she had her best career finish of eighth in the 4 × 5 km relay at Lillehammer in 1994 and her best individual finish of 14th in the 5 km + 10 km combined pursuit at those same games.

Ruchała's best finish at the FIS Nordic World Ski Championships was 14th in the 15 km event at Val di Fiemme in 1991. Her best World cup finish was 12th in a 10 km event in Slovakia in 1993.

Ruchała's best individual career finish was second in three FIS races at distances up to 10 km from 1993 to 1997.

== Cross-country skiing results ==
All results are sourced from the International Ski Federation (FIS).

=== Olympic Games ===
Year	Age	5 km	15 km	Pursuit	30 km	4 × 5 km relay
1992	31	40	34	DNS	24	10
1994	33	15	—	14	16	8
1998	37	33	—	35	—	13

=== World Championships ===
Year	Age	5 km	10 km classical	10 km freestyle	15 km	Pursuit	30 km	4 × 5 km relay
1989	28	—N/a	26	37	27	—N/a	25	12
1991	30	27	—N/a	—	14	—N/a	26	7
1993	32	44	—N/a	—N/a	22	34	23	11
1995	34	26	—N/a	—N/a	—	27	—	—
1997	36	45	—N/a	—N/a	—	48	50	13

=== World Cup ===
==== Season standings ====
Season	Age			
Season	Age	Overall	Long Distance	Sprint
1989	28	NC	—N/a	—N/a
1991	30	45	—N/a	—N/a
1992	31	NC	—N/a	—N/a
1993	32	34	—N/a	—N/a
1994	33	33	—N/a	—N/a
1995	34	40	—N/a	—N/a
1996	35	NC	—N/a	—N/a
1997	36	NC	NC	NC
1998	37	63	NC	59
