= Jan Ziemianin =

Polish biathlete (born 1962)

Personal information
- Nationality: Polish
- Born: 19 May 1962 (age 62); Mszana Dolna, Poland

Sport
- Sport: Biathlon

Jan Ziemianin (born 19 May 1962) is a Polish biathlete. He competed at the 1992 Winter Olympics, the 1994 Winter Olympics and the 1998 Winter Olympics.
