= Cross-country skiing at the 1992 Winter Olympics – Women's 15 kilometre classical =

Women's 15 kilometre classical at the XVI Olympic Winter Games
- Venue: Les Saisies
- Dates: 9 February 1992
- Competitors: 53 from 21 nations
- Winning time: 42:20.8

Medalists
1st place, gold medalist(s)		Lyubov Yegorova; Unified Team
2nd place, silver medalist(s)		Marjut Lukkarinen; Finland
3rd place, bronze medalist(s)		Yelena Välbe; Unified Team

The women's 15 kilometre classical cross-country skiing competition at the 1992 Winter Olympics in Albertville, France, was held on Sunday 9 February at Les Saisies.

== Results ==
The results:

Rank	Bib	Name	Country	Time	Deficit
1st place, gold medalist(s)	16	Lyubov Yegorova	Unified Team	42:20.8	–
2nd place, silver medalist(s)	42	Marjut Lukkarinen	Finland	43:29.9	+1:09.1
3rd place, bronze medalist(s)	34	Yelena Välbe	Unified Team	43:42.3	+1:21.5
4	2	Raisa Smetanina	Unified Team	44:01.5	+1:40.7
5	46	Stefania Belmondo	Italy	44:02.4	+1:41.6
6	54	Marja-Liisa Kirvesniemi	Finland	44:02.7	+1:41.9
7	37	Inger Helene Nybråten	Norway	44:18.6	+1:57.8
8	51	Trude Dybendahl	Norway	44:31.5	+2:10.7
9	27	Gabriella Paruzzi	Italy	44:44.0	+2:23.2
10	28	Marie-Helene Westin	Sweden	45:00.5	+2:39.7
11	39	Vida Vencienė	Lithuania	45:12.9	+2:52.1
12	49	Natalya Martynova	Unified Team	45:16.1	+2:55.3
13	41	Lubomíra Balážová	Czechoslovakia	45:22.6	+3:01.8
14	53	Kateřina Neumannová	Czechoslovakia	45:28.6	+3:07.8
15	31	Manuela Oschmann	Germany	45:28.8	+3:08.0
16	47	Sylvia Honegger	Switzerland	45:33.7	+3:12.9
17	18	Pirkko Määttä	Finland	45:40.5	+3:19.7
18	8	Zora Simčáková	Czechoslovakia	45:45.6	+3:24.8
19	20	Heike Wezel	Germany	45:50.6	+3:29.8
20	26	Solveig Pedersen	Norway	45:51.3	+3:30.5
21	6	Inger Lise Hegge	Norway	46:03.9	+3:43.1
22	4	Sirpa Ryhänen	Finland	46:06.9	+3:46.1
23	35	Carina Görlin	Sweden	46:09.4	+3:48.6
24	23	Bernadeta Bocek	Poland	46:18.6	+3:57.8
25	29	Natascia Leonardi	Switzerland	46:32.7	+4:11.9
26	48	Magdalena Wallin	Sweden	46:40.2	+4:19.4
27	14	Nancy Fiddler	United States	46:42.4	+4:21.6
28	43	Sylvie Giry-Rousset	France	46:48.5	+4:27.7
29	10	Angela Schmidt-Foster	Canada	46:55.0	+4:34.2
30	15	Li Gyong-Hui	North Korea	47:10.5	+4:49.7
31	7	Lis Frost	Sweden	47:18.3	+4:57.5
32	30	Carole Stanisière	France	47:20.1	+4:59.3
33	21	Anna Janoušková	Czechoslovakia	47:29.3	+5:08.5
34	52	Małgorzata Ruchała	Poland	47:36.3	+5:15.5
35	32	Dorota Kwaśny	Poland	47:44.4	+5:23.6
36	44	Brenda White	United States	48:06.0	+5:45.2
37	24	Fumiko Aoki	Japan	48:30.2	+6:09.4
38	12	Katarzyna Popieluch	Poland	48:45.3	+6:24.5
39	45	Piret Niglas	Estonia	48:58.4	+6:37.6
40	33	Lorna Sasseville	Canada	49:18.1	+6:57.3
41	5	Sue Forbes	United States	49:42.7	+7:21.9
42	1	Naomi Hoshikawa	Japan	49:46.2	+7:25.4
43	25	Rhonda DeLong	Canada	49:49.7	+7:28.9
44	50	Dorcas Denhartog-Wonsavage	United States	50:00.5	+7:39.7
45	22	Reneta Bancheva	Bulgaria	50:17.4	+7:56.6
46	11	Gong Guiping	China	50:56.3	+8:35.5
47	19	Wang Yan	China	50:57.3	+8:36.5
48	9	Anna Bozsik	Hungary	53:46.5	+11:25.7
49	13	Ines Alder	Argentina	54:26.9	+12:06.1
50	17	Jenny Palacios-Stillo	Honduras	1:10:09.2	+27:48.4
	40	Miwa Ota	Japan	DNF	
	36	Bice Vanzetta	Italy	DNF	
	3	Silke Schwager	Switzerland	DNF	
	38	Barbara Mettler	Switzerland	DNS	
