= Sweden at the 1994 Winter Olympics =

- IOC code: SWE
- NOC: Swedish Olympic Committee
- Website: www.sok.se (in Swedish and English)

in Lillehammer
- Competitors: 84 (64 men, 20 women) in 10 sports
- Flag bearer: Pernilla Wiberg (alpine skiing)
- Medals Ranked 10th: Gold 2 Silver 1 Bronze 0 Total 3

Winter Olympics appearances (overview)
- 1924; 1928; 1932; 1936; 1948; 1952; 1956; 1960; 1964; 1968; 1972; 1976; 1980; 1984; 1988; 1992; 1994; 1998; 2002; 2006; 2010; 2014; 2018; 2022; 2026

Sweden competed at the 1994 Winter Olympics in Lillehammer, Norway.

== Medalists ==
Medal	Name	Sport	Event	Date
Gold	Pernilla Wiberg	Alpine skiing	Women's combined	21 February
Gold	Sweden men's national ice hockey team: Håkan Algotsson; Jonas Bergqvist; Charles Berglund; Andreas Dackell; Christian Due-Boje; Niklas Eriksson; Peter Forsberg; Roger Hansson; Roger Johansson; Jörgen Jönsson; Kenny Jönsson; Tomas Jonsson; Patrik Juhlin; Patric Kjellberg; Magnus Svensson; Håkan Loob; Mats Näslund; Stefan Örnskog; Leif Rohlin; Daniel Rydmark; Tommy Salo; Fredrik Stillman; Michael Sundlöv	Ice hockey	Men's tournament	27 February
Silver	Marie Lindgren	Freestyle skiing	Women's aerials	24 February

== Competitors ==
The following is the list of number of competitors in the Games.

Sport	Men	Women	Total
Alpine skiing	6	5	11
Biathlon	5	5	10
Bobsleigh	4	–	4
Cross-country skiing	7	6	13
Freestyle skiing	5	3	8
Ice hockey	22	–	22
Luge	5	0	5
Short track speed skating	1	0	1
Ski jumping	5	–	5
Speed skating	4	1	5
Total	64	20	84

== Alpine skiing ==
Men

Athlete	Event	Race 1	Race 2	Total	
Athlete	Event	Time	Time	Time	Rank
Patrik Järbyn	Downhill			1:48.05	34
Fredrik Nyberg	Downhill			1:47.97	32
Fredrik Nyberg	Super-G			1:34.96	25
Tobias Hellman	Super-G			1:34.59	19
Patrik Järbyn	Super-G			1:34.51	18
Patrik Järbyn	Giant Slalom	DNF	–	DNF	–
Tobias Hellman	Giant Slalom	DNF	–	DNF	–
Johan Wallner	Giant Slalom	1:31.57	1:25.89	2:57.46	25
Fredrik Nyberg	Giant Slalom	1:29.96	1:24.98	2:54.94	18
Tobias Hellman	Slalom	DNF	–	DNF	–
Johan Wallner	Slalom	DNF	–	DNF	–
Mats Ericson	Slalom	1:03.25	1:02.24	2:05.49	13
Thomas Fogdö	Slalom	1:02.98	1:00.07	2:03.05	5

Men's combined

Athlete	Downhill	Slalom		Total	
Athlete	Time	Time 1	Time 2	Total time	Rank
Tobias Hellman	1:40.25	52.00	49.49	3:21.74	13
Patrik Järbyn	1:38.44	DSQ	–	DSQ	–
Fredrik Nyberg	1:38.40	52.56	49.34	3:20.30	8

Women

Athlete	Event	Race 1	Race 2	Total	
Athlete	Event	Time	Time	Time	Rank
Erika Hansson	Downhill			1:39.40	34
Pernilla Wiberg	Downhill			1:37.61	9
Erika Hansson	Super-G			1:24.50	27
Pernilla Wiberg	Super-G			1:22.67	4
Erika Hansson	Giant Slalom	DNF	–	DNF	–
Ylva Nowén	Giant Slalom	DNF	–	DNF	–
Kristina Andersson	Giant Slalom	DNF	–	DNF	–
Pernilla Wiberg	Giant Slalom	DNF	–	DNF	–
Erika Hansson	Slalom	DNF	–	DNF	–
Kristina Andersson	Slalom	1:01.46	59.29	2:00.75	19
Titti Rodling	Slalom	1:01.01	58.06	1:59.07	13
Pernilla Wiberg	Slalom	59.05	57.63	1:56.68	4

Women's combined

Athlete	Downhill	Slalom		Total	
Athlete	Time	Time 1	Time 2	Total time	Rank
Erika Hansson	1:29.93	51.12	49.12	3:10.17	11
Pernilla Wiberg	1:28.70	49.35	47.11	3:05.16	1st place, gold medalist(s)

== Biathlon ==
Men

Event	Athlete	Misses ^{1}	Time	Rank
10 km Sprint	Per Brandt	1	31:27.4	38
10 km Sprint	Ulf Johansson	3	30:24.2	20

Event	Athlete	Time	Misses	Adjusted time ^{2}	Rank
20 km	Glenn Olsson	1'00:55.9	7	1'07:55.9	66
20 km	Ulf Johansson	58:14.2	4	1'02:14.2	42
20 km	Per Brandt	58:09.4	3	1'01:09.4	27
20 km	Leif Andersson	1'00:03.7	1	1'01:03.7	25

Men's 4 × 7.5 km relay

Athletes	Race		
Athletes	Misses ^{1}	Time	Rank
Per Brandt; Mikael Löfgren; Leif Andersson; Ulf Johansson	0	1'34:38.8	11

Women

Event	Athlete	Misses ^{1}	Time	Rank
7.5 km Sprint	Christina Eklund	5	31:10.0	67
7.5 km Sprint	Eva-Karin Westin	2	29:50.4	60
7.5 km Sprint	Catarina Eklund	2	29:44.6	59

Event	Athlete	Time	Misses	Adjusted time ^{2}	Rank
15 km	Catarina Eklund	55:38.4	5	1'00:38.4	60
15 km	Christina Eklund	56:25.6	4	1'00:25.6	58
15 km	Maria Schylander	56:14.2	3	59:14.2	46

Women's 4 × 7.5 km relay

Athletes	Race		
Athletes	Misses ^{1}	Time	Rank
Eva-Karin Westin; Catarina Eklund; Maria Schylander; Heléne Dahlberg	0	1'58:07.2	9

^{1} A penalty loop of 150 metres had to be skied per missed target.
^{2} One minute added per missed target.

== Bobsleigh ==
Sled	Athletes	Event	Run 1		Run 2		Run 3		Run 4		Total	
Sled	Athletes	Event	Time	Rank	Time	Rank	Time	Rank	Time	Rank	Time	Rank
SWE-1	Fredrik Gustafsson; Hans Byberg	Two-man	53.40	19	53.69	20	53.60	23	53.84	21	3:34.53	22

Sled	Athletes	Event	Run 1		Run 2		Run 3		Run 4		Total	
Sled	Athletes	Event	Time	Rank	Time	Rank	Time	Rank	Time	Rank	Time	Rank
SWE-1	Fredrik Gustafsson; Jörgen Kruse; Lennart Westermark; Hans Byberg	Four-man	52.53	19	52.49	15	52.58	15	52.72	15	3:30.32	17

== Cross-country skiing ==
Men

Event	Athlete	Race	
Event	Athlete	Time	Rank
10 km C	Niklas Jonsson	26:27.6	30
10 km C	Torgny Mogren	26:21.7	27
10 km C	Christer Majbäck	25:55.2	19
10 km C	Jan Ottosson	25:47.9	14
15 km pursuit^{1} F	Christer Majbäck	40:22.5	23
15 km pursuit^{1} F	Jan Ottosson	39:12.4	15
30 km F	Torgny Mogren	1'18:41.3	24
30 km F	Mathias Fredriksson	1'18:34.5	23
30 km F	Anders Bergström	1'18:22.2	22
30 km F	Henrik Forsberg	1'16:10.8	12
50 km C	Niklas Jonsson	2'17:54.9	27
50 km C	Jan Ottosson	2'13:55.2	18
50 km C	Christer Majbäck	2'10:03.8	6

^{1} Starting delay based on 10 km results.
C = Classical style, F = Freestyle

Men's 4 × 10 km relay

Athletes	Race	
Athletes	Time	Rank
Jan Ottosson; Christer Majbäck; Anders Bergström; Henrik Forsberg	1'45:22.7	6

Women

Event	Athlete	Race	
Event	Athlete	Time	Rank
5 km C	Anna-Lena Fritzon	15:52.9	35
5 km C	Annika Evaldsson	15:35.7	25
5 km C	Anna Frithioff	15:13.3	17
5 km C	Antonina Ordina	14:59.2	10
10 km pursuit^{2} F	Anna Frithioff	32:50.1	37
10 km pursuit^{2} F	Annika Evaldsson	32:03.4	29
10 km pursuit^{2} F	Anna-Lena Fritzon	31:29.5	25
10 km pursuit^{2} F	Antonina Ordina	29:23.5	9
15 km F	Annika Evaldsson	45:25.4	29
15 km F	Anna-Lena Fritzon	44:26.9	19
15 km F	Marie-Helene Östlund	44:03.6	17
15 km F	Antonina Ordina	42:29.1	7
30 km C	Lis Frost	1'33:04.1	28
30 km C	Anna Frithioff	1'29:07.2	13
30 km C	Marie-Helene Östlund	1'28:46.2	12
30 km C	Antonina Ordina	1'28:39.2	11

^{2} Starting delay based on 5 km results.
C = Classical style, F = Freestyle

Women's 4 × 5 km relay

Athletes	Race	
Athletes	Time	Rank
Anna Frithioff; Marie-Helene Östlund; Anna-Lena Fritzon; Antonina Ordina	1'00:05.8	6

== Freestyle skiing ==
Men

Athlete	Event	Qualification			Final		
Athlete	Event	Time	Points	Rank	Time	Points	Rank
Leif Persson	Moguls	24.04	24.40	14 Q	24.21	24.05	12
Fredrik Thulin	Moguls	25.20	24.67	11 Q	25.11	24.50	10
Anders Jonell	Moguls	23.73	24.75	10 Q	24.21	24.50	11
Jörgen Pääjärvi	Moguls	24.95	24.90	9 Q	23.89	25.51	5
Mats Johansson	Aerials		192.57	11 Q		207.52	8

Women

Athlete	Event	Qualification			Final		
Athlete	Event	Time	Points	Rank	Time	Points	Rank
Helena Waller	Moguls	32.24	22.05	17	did not advance		
Liselotte Johansson	Aerials		142.15	14	did not advance		
Marie Lindgren	Aerials		155.70	3 Q		165.88	2nd place, silver medalist(s)

== Ice hockey ==
Summary

Key:

- OT – Overtime
- GWS – Match decided by penalty-shootout

Team	Event	Group stage						Quarterfinal	Semifinal / Pl.	Final / BM / Pl.	
Team	Event	Opposition Score	Opposition Score	Opposition Score	Opposition Score	Opposition Score	Rank	Opposition Score	Opposition Score	Opposition Score	Rank
Sweden men's	Men's tournament	Slovakia; T 4–4	Italy; W 4–1	France; W 7–1	United States; W 6–4	Canada; L 2–3	3 Q	Germany; W 3–0	Russia; W 4–3	Canada; W 3–2 SO	1st place, gold medalist(s)

An exciting Gold medal game saw Sweden force overtime by tying the score with less than two minutes to go. After a scoreless overtime, the winner was determined by a shootout. The first five rounds saw two players for each side make their penalty shots (Nedved and Kariya for Canada and Forsberg and Svennson for Sweden). In the sixth round, both Nedved and Svensson missed their shots. Forsberg then scored on Canadian goaltender Hirsch to start the seventh round. Kariya took Canada's seventh round shot and was stopped by Swedish goaltender Salo—giving the Swedes the gold medal.

In 1995, the Swedish postal service memorialized Forsberg's game winning shootout goal. Because Hirsch would not grant permission for his likeness to be used on the stamp he was 'disguised' by means of changing the color of his sweater and his player number.

=== Group B ===
Twelve participating teams were placed in the two groups. After playing a round-robin, the top four teams in each group advanced to the Medal Round while the last two teams competed in the consolation round for the 9th to 12th places.

Team advanced to the Final Round
Team sent to compete in the consolation round

Team	GP	W	L	T	GF	GA	PTS
Slovakia	5	3	0	2	26	14	8
Canada	5	3	1	1	17	11	7
Sweden	5	3	1	1	23	13	7
United States	5	1	1	3	21	17	5
Italy	5	1	4	0	15	31	2
France	5	0	4	1	11	27	1

Sweden	4:4	Slovakia
Sweden	4:1	Italy
Sweden	7:1	France
Sweden	6:4	United States
Canada	3:2	Sweden

=== Final round ===
Quarter final

Team 1	Score	Team 2
Germany	0–3	Sweden

Semi-final

Team 1	Score	Team 2
Sweden	4–3	Russia

Gold medal match

Team 1	Score	Team 2
Canada	2–3	Sweden (gold)

=== Leading scorers ===
Rk		GP	G	A	Pts
4	Håkan Loob	6	4	3	7
6	Patrik Juhlin	8	7	1	8
11	Peter Forsberg	8	2	6	8

- Team roster

- Håkan Algotsson
- Tommy Salo
- Michael Sundlöv
- Christian Due-Boje
- Roger Johansson
- Tomas Jonsson
- Kenny Jönsson
- Leif Rohlin
- Fredrik Stillman
- Magnus Svensson
- Jonas Bergqvist
- Charles Berglund
- Andreas Dackell
- Niklas Eriksson
- Peter Forsberg
- Roger Hansson
- Patrik Juhlin
- Jörgen Jönsson
- Patric Kjellberg
- Håkan Loob
- Mats Näslund
- Daniel Rydmark
- Stefan Örnskog

- Head coach: Curt Lundmark

== Luge ==
Men

Athlete	Run 1		Run 2		Run 3		Run 4		Total	
Athlete	Time	Rank	Time	Rank	Time	Rank	Time	Rank	Time	Rank
Bengt Walden	51.331	18	51.325	16	51.091	17	51.105	15	3:24.852	17
Anders Söderberg	51.111	16	51.197	15	50.809	12	50.982	12	3:24.099	13
Mikael Holm	50.917	13	51.087	14	50.946	16	51.099	14	3:24.049	12

(Men's) Doubles

Athletes	Run 1		Run 2		Total	
Athletes	Time	Rank	Time	Rank	Time	Rank
Hans Kohala; Carl-Johan Lindqvist	48.970	12	48.268	14	1:38.238	13

== Short track speed skating ==
Men

Athlete	Event	Round one		Quarter finals		Semi finals		Finals	
Athlete	Event	Time	Rank	Time	Rank	Time	Rank	Time	Final rank
Martin Johansson	500 m	44.94	2 Q	44.96	2 Q	46.04	4 QB	45.24	7
Martin Johansson	1000 m	1:32.50	3	did not advance					

== Ski jumping ==
Athlete	Event	Jump 1		Jump 2		Total	
Athlete	Event	Distance	Points	Distance	Points	Points	Rank
Magnus Westman	Normal hill	78.5	88.5	67.5	59.5	148.0	53
Staffan Tällberg	Normal hill	81.0	97.0	82.0	98.5	197.0	34
Fredrik Johansson	Normal hill	86.5	102.0	70.0	71.0	173.0	43
Mikael Martinsson	Normal hill	87.0	108.5	90.0	114.0	222.5	23
Staffan Tällberg	Large hill	88.5	24.8	82.5	36.5	61.3	56
Johan Rasmussen	Large hill	93.0	62.4	87.5	52.5	114.9	41
Mikael Martinsson	Large hill	94.5	65.6	99.0	74.7	140.3	34
Fredrik Johansson	Large hill	95.5	68.4	88.0	54.9	123.3	40

Men's team large hill

Athletes	Result	
Athletes	Points ^{1}	Rank
Mikael Martinsson; Staffan Tällberg; Johan Rasmussen; Fredrik Johansson	653.3	10

^{1} Four teams members performed two jumps each.

== Speed skating ==
Men

Event	Athlete	Race	
Event	Athlete	Time	Rank
500 m	Magnus Enfeldt	38.10	34
500 m	Hans Markström	37.53	25
1000 m	Hans Markström	1:15.50	29
1000 m	Magnus Enfeldt	1:15.18	23
5000 m	Per Bengtsson	6:57.37	14
5000 m	Jonas Schön	6:53.39	12
10,000 m	Per Bengtsson	14:48.00	16
10,000 m	Jonas Schön	14:10.15	8

Women

Event	Athlete	Race	
Event	Athlete	Time	Rank
3000 m	Jasmin Krohn	4:33.34	20
