= Sweden at the 1992 Winter Olympics =

- IOC code: SWE
- NOC: Swedish Olympic Committee
- Website: www.sok.se (in Swedish and English)

in Albertville
- Competitors: 73 (56 men, 17 women) in 9 sports
- Flag bearer: Tomas Gustafson (speed skating)
- Medals Ranked 13th: Gold 1 Silver 0 Bronze 3 Total 4

Winter Olympics appearances (overview)
- 1924; 1928; 1932; 1936; 1948; 1952; 1956; 1960; 1964; 1968; 1972; 1976; 1980; 1984; 1988; 1992; 1994; 1998; 2002; 2006; 2010; 2014; 2018; 2022; 2026

Sweden competed at the 1992 Winter Olympics in Albertville, France.

== Medalists ==
Medal	Name	Sport	Event	Date
Gold	Pernilla Wiberg	Alpine skiing	Women's giant slalom	19 February
Bronze	Christer Majbäck	Cross-country skiing	Men's 10 kilometre classical	13 February
Bronze	Leif Andersson; Ulf Johansson; Mikael Löfgren; Tord Wiksten	Biathlon	Men's relay	16 February
Bronze	Mikael Löfgren	Biathlon	Men's individual	20 February

== Competitors ==
The following is the list of number of competitors in the Games.

Sport	Men	Women	Total
Alpine skiing	5	3	8
Biathlon	5	5	10
Cross-country skiing	6	6	12
Figure skating	0	1	1
Freestyle skiing	3	1	4
Ice hockey	22	–	22
Luge	3	0	3
Ski jumping	5	–	5
Speed skating	7	1	8
Total	56	17	73

== Alpine skiing ==
Men

Athlete	Event	Race 1	Race 2	Total	
Athlete	Event	Time	Time	Time	Rank
Fredrik Nyberg	Super-G			1:14.61	11
Fredrik Nyberg	Giant Slalom	1:06.09	1:02.91	2:09.00	8
Johan Wallner	Giant Slalom	1:05.64	DNF	DNF	–
Johan Wallner	Slalom	55.29	DNF	DNF	–
Mats Ericson	Slalom	53.92	54.09	1:48.01	14
Jonas Nilsson	Slalom	53.58	52.99	1:46.57	8
Thomas Fogdö	Slalom	52.85	52.63	1:45.48	5

Women

Athlete	Event	Race 1	Race 2	Total	
Athlete	Event	Time	Time	Time	Rank
Pernilla Wiberg	Super-G			1:24.58	12
Ylva Nowén	Giant Slalom	1:08.63	DNF	DNF	–
Kristina Andersson	Giant Slalom	1:07.53	1:07.70	2:15.23	10
Pernilla Wiberg	Giant Slalom	1:06.36	1:06.38	2:12.74	1st place, gold medalist(s)
Pernilla Wiberg	Slalom	DNF	–	DNF	–
Ylva Nowén	Slalom	50.92	46.92	1:37.84	21
Kristina Andersson	Slalom	48.76	46.19	1:34.95	11

== Biathlon ==
Men

Event	Athlete	Misses ^{1}	Time	Rank
10 km Sprint	Anders Mannelqvist	3	29:52.0	67
10 km Sprint	Tord Wiksten	1	28:40.5	48
10 km Sprint	Mikael Löfgren	0	27:33.3	20
10 km Sprint	Ulf Johansson	0	27:19.0	14

Event	Athlete	Time	Misses	Adjusted time ^{2}	Rank
20 km	Ulf Johansson	1'02:58.2	2	1'04:58.2	64
20 km	Anders Mannelqvist	59:38.6	3	1'02:38.6	43
20 km	Leif Andersson	59:09.3	3	1'02:09.3	38
20 km	Mikael Löfgren	55:59.4	2	57:59.4	3rd place, bronze medalist(s)

Men's 4 × 7.5 km relay

Athletes	Race		
Athletes	Misses ^{1}	Time	Rank
Ulf Johansson; Leif Andersson; Tord Wiksten; Mikael Löfgren	0	1'25:38.2	3rd place, bronze medalist(s)

Women

Event	Athlete	Misses ^{1}	Time	Rank
7.5 km Sprint	Christina Eklund	4	29:25.9	57
7.5 km Sprint	Anna Hermansson	3	28:20.3	43
7.5 km Sprint	Inger Björkbom	1	27:13.1	26
7.5 km Sprint	Mia Stadig	0	26:15.0	14

Event	Athlete	Time	Misses	Adjusted time ^{2}	Rank
15 km	Anna Hermansson	54:49.0	9	1'03:49.0	64
15 km	Mia Stadig	54:54.5	3	57:54.5	33
15 km	Catarina Eklund	55:31.2	2	57:31.2	29
15 km	Inger Björkbom	52:52.8	1	53:52.8	12

Women's 3 × 7.5 km relay

Athletes	Race		
Athletes	Misses ^{1}	Time	Rank
Christina Eklund; Inger Björkbom; Mia Stadig	0	1'20:56.6	6

^{1} A penalty loop of 150 metres had to be skied per missed target.
^{2} One minute added per missed target.

== Cross-country skiing ==
Men

Event	Athlete	Race	
Event	Athlete	Time	Rank
10 km C	Henrik Forsberg	29:09.0	12
10 km C	Torgny Mogren	28:37.8	9
10 km C	Niklas Jonsson	28:03.1	5
10 km C	Christer Majbäck	27:56.4	3rd place, bronze medalist(s)
15 km pursuit^{1} F	Niklas Jonsson	41:02.1	13
15 km pursuit^{1} F	Henrik Forsberg	40:16.4	9
15 km pursuit^{1} F	Christer Majbäck	39:41.0	6
15 km pursuit^{1} F	Torgny Mogren	39:01.4	5
30 km C	Jan Ottosson	1'25:33.9	11
30 km C	Jyrki Ponsiluoma	1'25:24.4	8
30 km C	Niklas Jonsson	1'25:17.6	7
30 km C	Christer Majbäck	1'24:12.1	6
50 km F	Jan Ottosson	2'18:59.9	44
50 km F	Henrik Forsberg	2'16:22.7	37
50 km F	Christer Majbäck	2'11:13.3	16
50 km F	Torgny Mogren	2'10:29.9	12

^{1} Starting delay based on 10 km results.
C = Classical style, F = Freestyle

Men's 4 × 10 km relay

Athletes	Race	
Athletes	Time	Rank
Jan Ottosson; Christer Majbäck; Henrik Forsberg; Torgny Mogren	1'41:23.1	4

Women

Event	Athlete	Race	
Event	Athlete	Time	Rank
5 km C	Karin Säterkvist	15:44.6	34
5 km C	Ann-Marie Karlsson	15:43.8	33
5 km C	Carina Görlin	15:00.8	14
5 km C	Marie-Helene Westin	14:42.6	9
10 km pursuit^{2} F	Ann-Marie Karlsson	30:14.1	35
10 km pursuit^{2} F	Karin Säterkvist	29:27.6	30
10 km pursuit^{2} F	Carina Görlin	28:57.6	23
10 km pursuit^{2} F	Marie-Helene Westin	27:14.2	6
15 km C	Lis Frost	47:18.3	31
15 km C	Magdalena Wallin	46:40.2	26
15 km C	Carina Görlin	46:09.4	23
15 km C	Marie-Helene Westin	45:00.5	10
30 km F	Lis Frost	1'37:05.0	47
30 km F	Ann-Marie Karlsson	1'34:45.6	38
30 km F	Magdalena Wallin	1'33:46.6	34
30 km F	Marie-Helene Westin	1'27:16.2	7

^{2} Starting delay based on 5 km results.
C = Classical style, F = Freestyle

Women's 4 × 5 km relay

Athletes	Race	
Athletes	Time	Rank
Carina Görlin; Magdalena Wallin; Karin Säterkvist; Marie-Helene Westin	1'01:54.5	7

== Curling ==
Curling was a demonstration sport at the 1992 Winter Olympics.

Sweden
Karlstads CK, Karlstad

Skip: Dan-Ola Eriksson
Third: Sören Grahn
Second: Jonas Sjölander
Lead: Stefan Holmén
Alternate: Håkan Funk

== Figure skating ==
Women

Athlete	SP	FS	TFP	Rank
Helene Persson	24	DNF	DNF	–

== Freestyle skiing ==
Men

Athlete	Event	Qualification			Final		
Athlete	Event	Time	Points	Rank	Time	Points	Rank
Jörgen Pääjärvi	Moguls	31.98	22.98	12 Q	33.02	24.14	6
Björn Åberg	Moguls	33.10	23.10	10 Q	34.73	20.29	16
Leif Persson	Moguls	33.61	23.42	7 Q	33.04	22.99	8

Women

Athlete	Event	Qualification			Final		
Athlete	Event	Time	Points	Rank	Time	Points	Rank
Helena Waller	Moguls	42.53	14.56	20	did not advance		

== Ice hockey ==
Summary

Key:

- OT – Overtime
- GWS – Match decided by penalty-shootout

Team	Event	Group stage						Quarterfinal	Semifinal / Pl.	Final / BM / Pl.	
Team	Event	Opposition Score	Opposition Score	Opposition Score	Opposition Score	Opposition Score	Rank	Opposition Score	Opposition Score	Opposition Score	Rank
Sweden men's	Men's tournament	Poland; W 7–2	Italy; W 7–3	Germany; W 3–1	Finland; T 2–2	United States; T 3–3	2 Q	Czech Republic; L 1–3	Classification semifinal Finland; W 3–2	5th place final Germany; W 4–3	5

=== Group A ===
Twelve participating teams were placed in two groups. After playing a round-robin, the top four teams in each group advanced to the Medal Round while the last two teams competed in the consolation round for the 9th to 12th places.

Team advanced to the Final Round
Team sent to compete in the Consolation round

Team	GP	W	L	T	GF	GA	DIF	PTS
United States	5	4	0	1	18	7	11	9
Sweden	5	3	0	2	22	11	11	8
Finland	5	3	1	1	22	11	11	7
Germany	5	2	3	0	11	12	-1	4
Italy	5	1	4	0	18	24	-6	2
Poland	5	0	5	0	4	30	-26	0

Sweden	7:2	Poland
Sweden	7:3	Italy
Sweden	3:1	Germany
Finland	2:2	Sweden
United States	3:3	Sweden

=== Final round ===
Quarter-finals

Czechoslovakia	3:1	Sweden

Consolation round 5th-8th places

Sweden	3:2	Finland

5th-place match

Sweden 5th	4:3	Germany

- Team roster:

- Roger Nordström
- Tommy Söderström
- Peter Andersson (1962)
- Peter Andersson (1965)
- Kenneth Kennholt
- Petri Liimatainen
- Börje Salming
- Tommy Sjödin
- Fredrik Stillman
- Charles Berglund
- Patrik Carnbäck
- Lars Edström
- Patrik Erickson
- Peter Ottosson
- Bengt-Åke Gustafsson
- Mikael Johansson
- Patric Kjellberg
- Håkan Loob
- Mats Näslund
- Thomas Rundqvist
- Daniel Rydmark
- Jan Viktorsson

- Head coach: Conny Evensson

== Luge ==
Men

Athlete	Run 1		Run 2		Run 3		Run 4		Total	
Athlete	Time	Rank	Time	Rank	Time	Rank	Time	Rank	Time	Rank
Mikael Holm	46.202	18	45.794	11	46.914	19	46.382	13	3:05.292	14

(Men's) Doubles

Athletes	Run 1		Run 2		Total	
Athletes	Time	Rank	Time	Rank	Time	Rank
Hans Kohala; Carl-Johan Lindqvist	46.661	8	46.473	6	1:33.134	6

== Ski jumping ==
Athlete	Event	Jump 1		Jump 2		Total	
Athlete	Event	Distance	Points	Distance	Points	Points	Rank
Jan Boklöv	Normal hill	77.5	84.0	80.0	91.5	175.5	47
Staffan Tällberg	Normal hill	80.0	91.5	80.0	94.5	186.0	35
Magnus Westman	Normal hill	81.5	97.9	79.0	90.9	188.8	28
Mikael Martinsson	Normal hill	82.0	99.2	82.0	100.7	199.9	17
Per-Inge Tällberg	Large hill	91.5	65.1	80.0	41.0	106.1	50
Magnus Westman	Large hill	96.0	70.9	87.5	57.0	127.9	44
Staffan Tällberg	Large hill	101.5	84.6	93.5	69.4	154.0	27
Mikael Martinsson	Large hill	104.0	89.1	98.5	79.4	168.5	16

Men's team large hill

Athletes	Result	
Athletes	Points ^{1}	Rank
Mikael Martinsson; Magnus Westman; Jan Boklöv; Staffan Tällberg	515.1	9

^{1} Four teams members performed two jumps each. The best three were counted.

== Speed skating ==
Men

Event	Athlete	Race	
Event	Athlete	Time	Rank
500 m	Joakim Karlberg	40.71	38
500 m	Bo König	39.06	34
500 m	Hans Markström	38.89	33
500 m	Björn Forslund	38.24	20
1000 m	Bo König	DNF	–
1000 m	Björn Forslund	1:17.71	31
1500 m	Jonas Schön	2:01.53	34
1500 m	Joakim Karlberg	2:00.01	26
1500 m	Bo König	1:58.94	21
5000 m	Per Bengtsson	7:23.03	21
5000 m	Tomas Gustafson	7:15.56	13
5000 m	Jonas Schön	7:12.15	9
10,000 m	Jonas Schön	14:46.20	16
10,000 m	Per Bengtsson	14:35.58	7

Women

Event	Athlete	Race	
Event	Athlete	Time	Rank
1500 m	Jasmin Krohn	2:09.62	13
3000 m	Jasmin Krohn	4:31.98	11
5000 m	Jasmin Krohn	7:50.64	11
