= König =

König (/ˈkeɪnɪɡ/; German: [ˈkøːnɪç]) is the German word for "king". In German and other languages applying the umlaut, the transliterations Koenig and Kœnig, when referring to a surname, also occur. As a surname in English, the use of Koenig is usual, and sometimes also Konig. Notable people with the name include:

== People ==
=== A to F ===
- Adam Koenig (born 1971), American politician
- Adrianus König (1867–1944), Dutch politician
- Aislinn Konig (born 1998), Canadian basketball player
- Alexander Koenig (1858–1940), German naturalist
- Alexander König (born 1966), German skater
- Alfons König (1898–1944), Wehrmacht officer during World War II
- Alfred König (1913–1987), Austrian-Turkish sprinter
- Andrew Koenig (1968–2010), American actor
- Andrew Koenig (politician) (born 1982), American politician in Missouri
- Andrew Koenig (programmer), American computer scientist and author
- Anna Leonore König (1771–1854), Swedish singer
- Arthur König (1856–1901), German physician and researcher into optics
- Bronson Koenig (born 1994), American basketball player
- Charles Konig (1774–1851), German-born British naturalist
- Claës König (1885–1961), Swedish horse rider
- Dave Konig (born 1962), American comedian
- Dénes Kőnig (1884–1944), Hungarian mathematician, son of Gyula
- Dieter König (1931–1991), hydroplane racer, manufacturer of Konig two stroke engines
- Doris König (born 1957), judge, jurisprudent and public law scholar
- Elazar Mordechai Koenig (1945–2018), Israeli Hasidic rabbi
- Ernst König (1908–1986), Wehrmacht officer during World War II
- Erwin König
- Eugen König (1896–1985), Wehrmacht officer during World War II
- Ezra Koenig (born 1984), American musician, Vampire Weekend
- Franz König (1905–2004), Cardinal, Archbishop of Vienna
- Franz König (surgeon) (1832–1910), German surgeon
- Franz Niklaus König (1765–1832), Swiss painter
- Franz Koenigs (1881–1941), German-Dutch banker and art collector
- Fred Koenig (1931–1993), American baseball player and coach
- Friedrich Koenig (1774–1833), German inventor
- Friedrich König (painter) (1857–1941), Austrian artist
- Friedrich Eduard König (1846–1936), German Protestant theologian and Semitic scholar
- Fritz Koenig (1924–2017), German artist and sculptor

=== G to M ===
- Gabriela König (born 1952), German politician
- Gedaliah Aharon Koenig, Israeli Hasidic rabbi
- George Konig (1856–1913), American politician
- Gottfried Michael Koenig (1926–2021), German-Dutch composer
- Gyula Kőnig (1849–1913), Hungarian mathematician
- Hannes Koenig (born 2001), German gymnast
- Harold G. Koenig, American psychiatrist
- Imre König (1899–1992), Hungarian chess master
- Jan Latham-Koenig (born 1953), English conductor
- Jared Koenig (born 1994), American baseball player
- Jörn König (born 1967), German politician
- Johann König (painter) (1586–1642), German painter
- Johann Friedrich König (1619–1664), German Lutheran theologian
- Johann Balthasar König (1691–1758), German composer
- Johann Samuel König (1712–1757), German mathematician
- Johann Gerhard König (1728–1785), German botanist active in India
- Johann König (gymnast) (1932–2020), Austrian gymnast
- Johann König (art dealer) (born 1981), German art dealer
- Johanna König (1921–2009), German actress
- John Koenig (diplomat), American diplomat
- John Koenig, creator of The Dictionary of Obscure Sorrows
- Joseph König (theologian) (1819–1900), German theologian
- Joseph König (chemist) (1843–1930), German chemist
- Juan Ramón Koenig (1623–1709) Peruvian scientist
- Julian Koenig (copywriter) (1921–2014), American advertising executive
- Karl König (1902–1966), Austrian paediatrician
- Kip Koenig, American film and television producer and screenwriter
- Klaus König (1934–2025), German operatic tenor
- Laird Koenig (1927–2023), American author
- Lea Koenig (born 1929), Israeli actor
- Leo von König (1871–1944), German painter
- Leopold König (born 1987), Czech road cyclist
- Lothar Koenigs (born 1965), German conductor
- Mark Koenig (1904–1993), American baseball player
- Marie-Pierre Kœnig (1898–1970), French army officer and politician
- Miroslav König (born 1972), Slovak football player
- Morris Koenig (1883–1939), Hungarian-American lawyer and judge

=== N to Z ===
- Oliver Koenig (born 1981), German athlete
- Ove König (1950–2020), Swedish speed skater
- Paul König (1867–1933), German merchant navy officer
- Paul König (Scouting)
- Peter Konig
- Pia König (born 1993), Austrian tennis player
- Pierre Koenig (1925–2004), American architect
- Ralf König (born 1960), German comic artist
- Regina König, German luger
- René König (1906–1992), German sociologist
- Robbie Koenig (born 1971), South African tennis player and broadcaster
- Robert Koenig (sculptor) (born 1961), British sculptor
- Robert Koenig (filmmaker) (born 1975), American film director, producer, writer and editor
- Robert König (1885–1979), Austrian mathematician
- Ronny König (born 1983), German football player
- Rudolf König (1865–1927), Austrian merchant, astronomer and selenographer
- Rudolph Koenig (1832–1901), German acoustical physicist
- Samuel S. Koenig (1872–1955), Hungarian-American lawyer and politician
- Sarah Koenig (born 1969), American journalist
- Shulamith Koenig (1930–2021), Israeli human rights activist and educator
- Stephanie Koenig, American actress and writer
- Sven Koenig (computer scientist), German-American computer scientist
- Sven Koenig (cricketer) (born 1973), South African cricketer
- Swen König (born 1985), Swiss football player
- Todd Koenig (born 1985), American football player
- Trevor Koenig (born 1974), Canadian ice hockey player
- Vroni König-Salmi (born 1969), Swiss orienteerer
- Walter Koenig (1936–2026), American actor
- Walter Koenig (wrestler) (born 1958), Australian wrestler
- William Edward Koenig (born 1956), American Catholic bishop
- Willy Koenig of Koenig Specials
- Wolf Koenig (1927–2014), German-Canadian film director, producer, animator and cinematographer
- Xavier Koenig (born 1984), Mauritian squash player

=== Fictional people ===
- Tolle Koenig, a fictional character in the anime Gundam SEED
- Eric Koenig, character in the Marvel Comics Universe
- Erwin König (died 1942), apocryphal World War II German sniper
- John Koenig (Space: 1999), a fictional character in the TV series Space: 1999
- Karin Koenig, from the video game Shadow Hearts: Covenant

== See also ==
- King (surname)
