= Fredrik Gustafsson =

Fredrik Gustafsson may refer to:

- Fredrik Gustafsson (academic)
- Fredrik Gustafsson (bobsleigh)
- Fredrik Gustafsson (film historian)

== See also ==
- Fredrik Gustafson, Swedish footballer
