= Freestyle skiing at the 1994 Winter Olympics – Men's moguls =

Men's moguls at the XVII Olympic Winter Games
- Venue: Kanthaugen Freestyle Arena
- Dates: 15–16 February 1994
- Competitors: 29 from 16 nations
- Winning Score: 27.24

Medalists
1st place, gold medalist(s)		Jean-Luc Brassard	Canada
2nd place, silver medalist(s)		Sergey Shupletsov	Russia
3rd place, bronze medalist(s)		Edgar Grospiron	France

The men's moguls event in freestyle skiing at the 1994 Winter Olympics in Lillehammer took place from 15 to 16 February at Kanthaugen Freestyle Arena.

== Results ==
=== Qualification ===
The top 16 advanced to the final.

Rank	Name	Country	Score	Notes
1	Jean-Luc Brassard	Canada	26.78	Q
2	Edgar Grospiron	France	26.65	Q
3	Sergey Shupletsov	Russia	26.64	Q
4	Olivier Cotte	France	26.36	Q
5	Olivier Allamand	France	25.89	Q
6	John Smart	Canada	25.47	Q
7	Adrian Costa	Australia	25.46	Q
8	Hans Engelsen Eide	Norway	25.06	Q
9	Jörgen Pääjärvi	Sweden	24.9	Q
10	Anders Jonell	Sweden	24.75	Q
11	Fredrik Thulin	Sweden	24.67	Q
12	Janne Lahtela	Finland	24.6	Q
13	Troy Benson	United States	24.42	Q
14	Leif Persson	Sweden	24.4	Q
15	Nick Cleaver	Australia	24.34	Q
16	Sean Smith	United States	24.31	Q
17	Jürg Biner	Switzerland	24.3	
18	Craig Rodman	United States	23.98	
19	Trace Worthington	United States	23.79	
20	Juha Holopainen	Finland	23.39	
21	Aleksey Bannikov	Kazakhstan	22.98	
22	Simone Mottini	Italy	22.87	
23	Klaus Weese	Germany	22.67	
24	José Rojas	Spain	22.49	
25	Hugh Hutchison	Great Britain	22.27	
26	Paul Costa	Australia	22.2	
27	Gota Miura	Japan	20.15	
28	Aleksandr Penigin	Belarus	19.41	
29	Walter Osta	Italy	14.13	

=== Final ===
Rank	Name	Country	Score	Notes
1st place, gold medalist(s)	Jean-Luc Brassard	Canada	27.24	
2nd place, silver medalist(s)	Sergey Shupletsov	Russia	26.90	
3rd place, bronze medalist(s)	Edgar Grospiron	France	26.64	
4	Olivier Cotte	France	25.79	
5	Jörgen Pääjärvi	Sweden	25.51	
6	Olivier Allamand	France	25.28	
7	John Smart	Canada	24.96	
8	Troy Benson	United States	24.86	
9	Janne Lahtela	Finland	24.78	
10	Anders Jonell	Sweden	24.50	
10	Fredrik Thulin	Sweden	24.50	
12	Leif Persson	Sweden	24.05	
13	Sean Smith	United States	23.43	
14	Adrian Costa	Australia	23.38	
15	Hans Engelsen Eide	Norway	23.32	
16	Nick Cleaver	Australia	23.02	
