= Friedrich König =

Friedrich König may refer to:

- Friedrich Koenig (1774–1833), German inventor
- Friedrich König (painter) (1857–1941), Austrian artist
- Friedrich Eduard König (1846–1936), German Protestant theologian and Semitic scholar

== See also ==
- König (disambiguation)
