= Aleksandr Penigin =

Belarusian freestyle skier

Personal information
- Nationality: Belarusian
- Born: 2 February 1974 (age 51); Minsk, Belarus

Sport
- Sport: Freestyle skiing

Aleksandr Penigin (born 2 February 1974) is a Belarusian freestyle skier. He competed in the men's moguls event at the 1994 Winter Olympics.
