= Paul Costa (skier) =

Australian freestyle skier (born 1971)

Personal information
- Nationality: Australian
- Born: 4 May 1971 (age 54) Mount Beauty, Victoria, Australia

Sport
- Sport: Freestyle skiing

Paul Costa (born 4 May 1971) is an Australian freestyle skier. He competed in the men's moguls event at the 1994 Winter Olympics.
