= Az-Zawhah =

Az-Zawḥah الزوحة
- Sub-district
- Location in Yemen
- Coordinates: 13°46′02″N 43°51′28″E
- Country: Yemen
- Governorate: Taiz Governorate
- District: Shar'ab as-Salam District

Population (2004)
  - Total: 4,014
- Time zone: UTC+3

Az-Zawḥah (Arabic: الزوحة) is a sub-district located in the Shar'ab as-Salam District, Taiz Governorate, Yemen. Az-Zawḥah had a population of 4,014 at the 2004 census.

== Villages ==
- Al-Najdayn village.
- Al-Maklub village.
- Al-'Aradah village.
- Al-Muqibirah village.
- Al-Najd village.
- Al-Qatieuh village.
- Al-Zilah village.
