= Banī Assela =

Banī ʿAssela العسيلة
- Sub-district
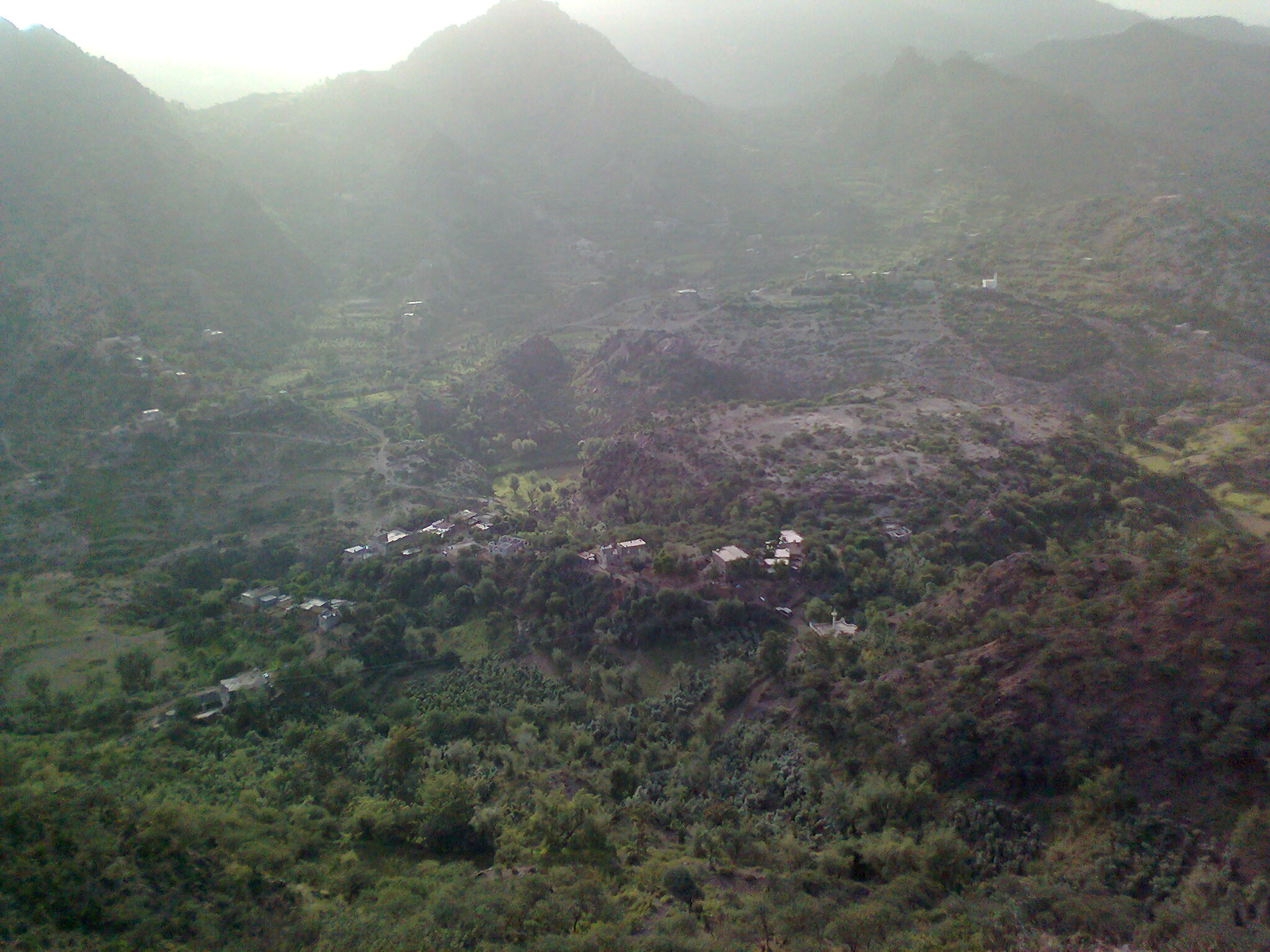
- A view of Shara'b as-Salam from Malat mount shows ‘Unshūq village

- Location in Yemen
- Coordinates: 13°47′08″N 43°52′45″E
- Country: Yemen
- Governorate: Taiz Governorate
- District: Shar'ab as-Salam District

Population (2004)
  - Total: 9,705
- Time zone: UTC+3

Banī ʿAssela (Arabic: العسيلة) is a sub-district in the Shar'ab as-Salam District, Taiz Governorate, Yemen. Banī ʿAssela had a population of 9,705 at the 2004 census.

== Villages ==
- al-Kibash village.
- Dufan village.
- ‘Unshūq village.
- al-Shuraf village.
- Ḥubol village.
