= Bani Bahir =

Banī Baḥir بني بحير
- Sub-district
- Location in Yemen
- Coordinates: 13°44′37″N 43°51′24″E
- Country: Yemen
- Governorate: Taiz Governorate
- District: Shar'ab as-Salam District

Population (2004)
  - Total: 1,030
- Time zone: UTC+3

Banī Baḥir (Arabic: بني بحير), sometimes called Banī Bakhir (Arabic: بني بخير), is a sub-district of the Shar'ab as-Salam District, in Taiz Governorate, Yemen. Banī Baḥir had a population of 1,030 at the 2004 census.

== Villages ==
- al-Masa'ad village.
- al-'Uqab village.
