= Ayfū' Ala' =

Ayfūʿ Alaʾ أيفوع أعلى
- Sub-district
- Location in Yemen
- Coordinates: 13°50′57″N 43°55′12″E
- Country: Yemen
- Governorate: Taiz Governorate
- District: Shar'ab as-Salam District

Population (2004)
  - Total: 9,853
- Time zone: UTC+3

Ayfūʿ Alaʾ (Arabic: أيفوع أعلى, lit. 'Upper Ayfūʿ') is a sub-district in the Shar'ab as-Salam District, Taiz Governorate, Yemen. Ayfūʿ Alaʾ had a population of 9,853 at the 2004 census.

== Villages ==
- Al-Mahjar village.
- Al-haql Al'alaa village.
- Di Malih village.
- Al-Muhabil village.
- Al-Ma'ar village.
- Mushimah village.
- Al-duwaf village.
- Ma'ayin village.
- Dhorab village.
- Al-Kabab village.
