= Banī 'Awn =

Banī ʿAwn بني عون
- Sub-district
- Location in Yemen
- Coordinates: 13°42′39.20″N 43°57′52″E
- Country: Yemen
- Governorate: Taiz Governorate
- District: Shar'ab as-Salam District

Population (2004)
  - Total: 4,175
- Time zone: UTC+3

Banī ʿAwn (Arabic: بني عون) is a sub-district of the Shar'ab as-Salam District, Taiz Governorate, Yemen. At the 2004 census, Banī ʿAwn had a population of 4,175.

== Villages ==
- Al-watia Al-kariba.
- Qa'dar *Al-mathirah.
- Al-hayja village.
- Al-qarf village.
- Al-hajifuh village.
- Al-hawabis village.
- Al-kharayib village.
- kawayakban village.
- Al-karba village.
