= Banī Saba' (Taiz) =

Banī Saba' بني سباء
- Sub-district
- Location in Yemen
- Coordinates: 13°48′43″N 43°51′13″E
- Country: Yemen
- Governorate: Taiz Governorate
- District: Shar'ab as-Salam District

Population (2004)
  - Total: 3,192
- Time zone: UTC+3

Banī Saba' (Arabic: بني سباء) is a sub-district in the Shar'ab as-Salam District, Taiz Governorate, Yemen. Banī Saba' had a population of 3,192 at the 2004 census.

== Villages ==
- Al-lawiah Al-suflaa(lower Al-lawiah) village.
- Al-lawiah Al'ulya(upper Al-lawiah) village.
