= Al-Ashmus =

Ashmus الاشموس
- Sub-district
- Location in Yemen
- Coordinates: 13°47′03″N 43°54′06″E
- Country: Yemen
- Governorate: Taiz Governorate
- District: Shar'ab as-Salam District

Population (2004)
  - Total: 2,814
- Time zone: UTC+3

Al-Ashmus (Arabic: الاشموس) is a sub-district of the Shar'ab as-Salam District, in Taiz Governorate, Yemen. Al-Ashmus had a population of 2,814 at the 2004 census.

== Villages ==
- Al-Ashmus village
