= Sean Smith (skier) =

American freestyle skier

Personal information
- Nationality: American
- Born: April 2, 1971 (age 55) London, Ontario, Canada

Sport
- Sport: Freestyle skiing

Sean Smith (born April 2, 1971) is an American freestyle skier. He competed in the men's moguls event at the 1994 Winter Olympics. He was born in Canada.
