= Anette Fanqvist =

Swedish cross-country skier

Personal information
- Full name: Gudrun Anette Veronika Fanqvist
- Nationality: Sweden
- Born: 16 June 1969 Fränsta, Sweden

Sport
- Sport: Skiing

World Cup career
- Seasons: 7 – (1992, 1994–1999)
- Indiv. starts: 40
- Indiv. podiums: 0
- Team starts: 10
- Team podiums: 2
- Team wins: 0
- Overall titles: 0 – (38th in 1995)
- Discipline titles: 0
Medal record
Women's cross-country skiing
Representing Sweden
World Championships
| Bronze medal – third place | 1995 Thunder Bay | 4 × 5 km relay |
Junior World Championships
| Silver medal – second place | 1989 Vang | 4 × 5 km relay |

Anette Fanqvist (born 16 June 1969) is a Swedish cross-country skier who competed from 1992 to 2002. She won a bronze medal in the 4 × 5 km relay at the 1995 FIS Nordic World Ski Championships in Thunder Bay, and had her best individual finish of 27th in the 15 km event at those same championships.

Fanqvist's best individual finish at the Winter Olympics was 37th in the 30 km event at Nagano in 1998. Her best individual career finish was second twice up to 10 km in Sweden (1995, 1998).

== Cross-country skiing results ==
All results are sourced from the International Ski Federation (FIS).

=== Olympic Games ===
| Year | Age | 5 km | 15 km | Pursuit | 30 km | 4 × 5 km relay |
|---|---|---|---|---|---|---|
| 1998 | 28 | — | DNS | — | 37 | 8 |

=== World Championships ===
- 1 medal – (1 bronze)

| Year | Age | 5 km | 15 km | Pursuit | 30 km | 4 × 5 km relay |
|---|---|---|---|---|---|---|
| 1995 | 25 | — | 27 | — | 29 | Bronze |
| 1999 | 29 | — | DNF | — | 35 | 8 |

=== World Cup ===
==== Season standings ====
| Season | Age | Overall | Long Distance | Sprint |
|---|---|---|---|---|
| 1992 | 23 | NC | —N/a | —N/a |
| 1994 | 25 | NC | —N/a | —N/a |
| 1995 | 26 | 38 | —N/a | —N/a |
| 1996 | 27 | NC | —N/a | —N/a |
| 1997 | 28 | NC | NC | — |
| 1998 | 29 | 56 | NC | 49 |
| 1999 | 30 | NC | NC | — |

==== Team podiums ====
- 2 podiums

| No. | Season | Date | Location | Race | Level | Place | Teammates |
|---|---|---|---|---|---|---|---|
| 1 | 1994–95 | 17 March 1995 | Thunder Bay, Canada | 4 × 5 km Relay C/F | World Championships^{[1]} | 3rd | Frithioff / Westin / Ordina |
| 2 | 1994–95 | 26 March 1995 | Sapporo, Japan | 4 × 5 km Relay C/F | World Cup | 3rd | Frithioff / Westin / Ordina |

Note: ^{1} Until the 1999 World Championships, World Championship races were included in the World Cup scoring system.
