= Al-Qufa'ah =

Al-Qufa'ah القفاعه
- Sub-district
- Location in Yemen
- Coordinates: 13°43′9.59″N 43°56′2.65″E
- Country: Yemen
- Governorate: Taiz Governorate
- District: Shar'ab as-Salam District

Population (2004)
  - Total: 5,969
- Time zone: UTC+3

Al-Qufa'ah (Arabic: القفاعة) is a Yemeni sub-district in the Shar'ab as-Salam District in Taiz Governorate. At the 2004 census, Al-Qufa'ah had a population of 5,969.

== Villages ==
- al-'Sa'adah village.
- al-Aizfar village.
- al-Shajaruh village.
- al-Hamri village.
- al-Mahalu village.
- al-Saqadiu village.
- al-Jibal village.
