= Ash-Shurayf =

Ash-Shurayf الشريف
- Sub-district
- Location in Yemen
- Coordinates: 13°46′04″N 43°50′46″E
- Country: Yemen
- Governorate: Taiz Governorate
- District: Shar'ab as-Salam District

Population (2004)
  - Total: 5,716
- Time zone: UTC+3

Ash-Shurayf (Arabic: الشريف) is a sub-district of the Shar'ab as-Salam District, Taiz Governorate, Yemen. Ash-Shurayf had a population of 5,716 at the 2004 census.

== Villages ==
- 'Adan Atarus village.
- Akmah Hassan village.
- Al-'aqibah village.
- Al-himsi village.
- Al-jabib village.
- Banī Kamal village.
- Ala'iwar village.
- Al-shasirah village.
- Al-maqadimah village.
- Al-daminah village.
- Al-kabsah village.
- Jahranuh village.
- Alziyla village.
- Banī 'Alwaan village.
