= Banī Wahban =

Banī Wahbān بني وهبان
- Sub-district
- Location in Yemen
- Coordinates: 13°47′18″N 43°50′40″E
- Country: Yemen
- Governorate: Taiz Governorate
- District: Shar'ab as-Salam District

Population (2004)
  - Total: 7,133
- Time zone: UTC+3

Banī Wahbān (Arabic: بني وهبان) is a sub-district of the Shar'ab as-Salam District, in Taiz Governorate, Yemen. Banī Wahbān had a population of 7,133 at the 2004 census. It lies in close proximity to the border with Ibb Governorate and contains the Mosque of Muhammad ibn Ziyad and a school.

== Villages ==
- Al-Shal village.
- Al-Sanab village.
- Khasha' village.
- Wadi Hizam village.
- Al-Suhilah village.
- Hijajuh village.
- Al-Wariduh village.
- Qayd village.
- Al-Badirah village.
- Al-Mihdadah village.
- Qardan village.
- Al-Saa'id village.
