= Mordechai Sharabi =

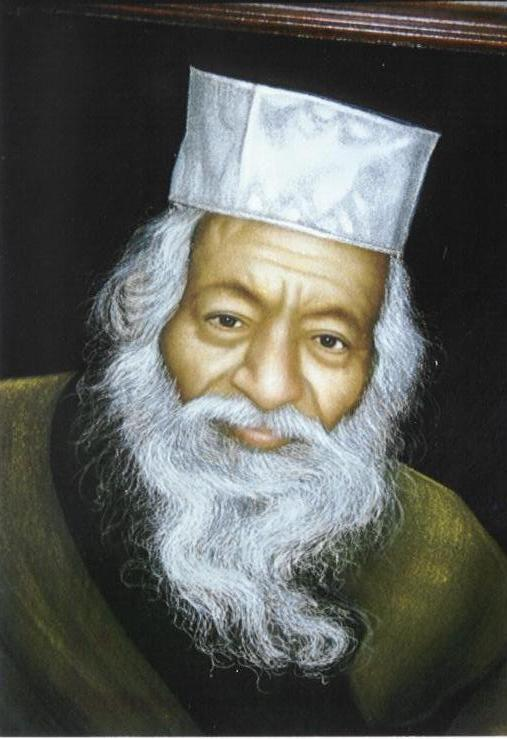
Portrait of Mordechai Sharabi

Mordechai Sharabi (Hebrew: מרדכי שרעבי; 1908, Shara'b As Salam, Yemen – 1984, Jerusalem) was a rabbi and the founder and rosh yeshiva of Yeshivat Nahar Shalom, a yeshiva for the study of the Kabbalah of Shalom Sharabi, in the Jerusalem neighborhood of Mahane Yehuda. A world-renowned kabbalist, he was accepted by the kabbalists of his time, and had the admiration of Rabbi Ovadia Yosef.

A set of three of his books focusing on remedies that built upon Shalom Sharabi's intentions from verses in selected Psalms were published posthumously.

== Notable students ==
Elazar Mordechai Koenig, spiritual leader of the Breslov Hasidim of Safed.

== Burial place ==
He is buried in Har HaMenuchot, also known as Givat Shaul Cemetery.
