= Al-Ahjur =

Al-Ahjur الاحجور
- Sub-district
- Location in Yemen
- Coordinates: 13°45′01″N 43°56′59″E
- Country: Yemen
- Governorate: Taiz Governorate
- District: Shar'ab as-Salam District

Population (2004)
  - Total: 5,856
- Time zone: UTC+3

Al-Ahjur (Arabic: الاحجور) is a sub-district of Shar'ab as-Salam District, in Taiz Governorate, Yemen. Al-Ahjur had a population of 5,856 at the 2004 census.

== Villages ==
- al-Rahbuh village.
- al-Mashaqib village.
- Shajjaf village.
- al-Ribat village.
- Al-Kidah village.
- al-Hida village.
- al-Wadi village.
- al-Dawamiu village.
- al-Wa'shah village.
- al-Qahaf Al-adyabe village.
