= Ayfū' Asfal =

Ayfūʿ Asfal أيفوع أسفل
- Sub-district
- Location in Yemen
- Coordinates: 13°49′51″N 43°54′10″E
- Country: Yemen
- Governorate: Taiz Governorate
- District: Shar'ab as-Salam District

Population (2004)
  - Total: 9,046
- Time zone: UTC+3

Ayfūʿ Asfal (Arabic: أيفوع أسفل, lit. 'Lower Ayfūʿ') is a sub-district in the Shar'ab as-Salam District, Taiz Governorate, Yemen. Ayfūʿ Asfal had a population of 9,046 at the 2004 census.

== Villages ==
- Khabah village.
- Al-qabul village.
- Al-sana'at village.
- Musar'a village.
- Shaqahah village.
- Banī 'Ubayd village.
- Wadi Kahaal village.
- Al-haql al-asfal village.
- Al-riysiu village.
