= At-Tibhah =

At-Tibhah التبهة
- Sub-district
- Location in Yemen
- Country: Yemen
- Governorate: Taiz Governorate
- District: Shar'ab as-Salam District

Population (2004)
  - Total: 3,247
- Time zone: UTC+3

At-Tibhah (Arabic: التبهة) is a sub-district in the Shar'ab as-Salam District, Taiz Governorate, Yemen. At the 2004 census, At-Tibhah had a population of 3,247.

== Villages ==
- al-Mhazalin village.
- al-Madahif village.
- al-Qal'ah village.
- al-Ma'atibah village.
- al-Tibhah village.
