= Bani Sha'b =

Banī Shaʿb بني شعب
- Sub-district
- Location in Yemen
- Coordinates: 13°46′34″N 43°51′55″E
- Country: Yemen
- Governorate: Taiz Governorate
- District: Shar'ab as-Salam District

Population (2004)
  - Total: 3,489
- Time zone: UTC+3

Banī Shaʿb (Arabic: بني شعب) is a sub-district of the Shar'ab as-Salam District, in Taiz Governorate, Yemen. Banī Shaʿb had a population of 3,489 at the 2004 census.
