= Friedrich König (painter) =

Austrian painter, illustrator and designer (1857–1941)

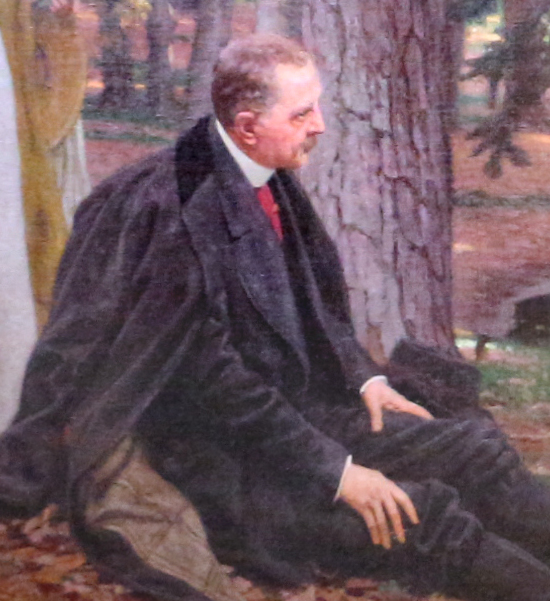
- Friedrich König, painted by Maximilian Lenx, ca. 1910
- Born: 20 December 1857; Vienna
- Died: 11 March 1941 (aged 83); Vienna
- Occupation: Painter, illustrator, graphic artist

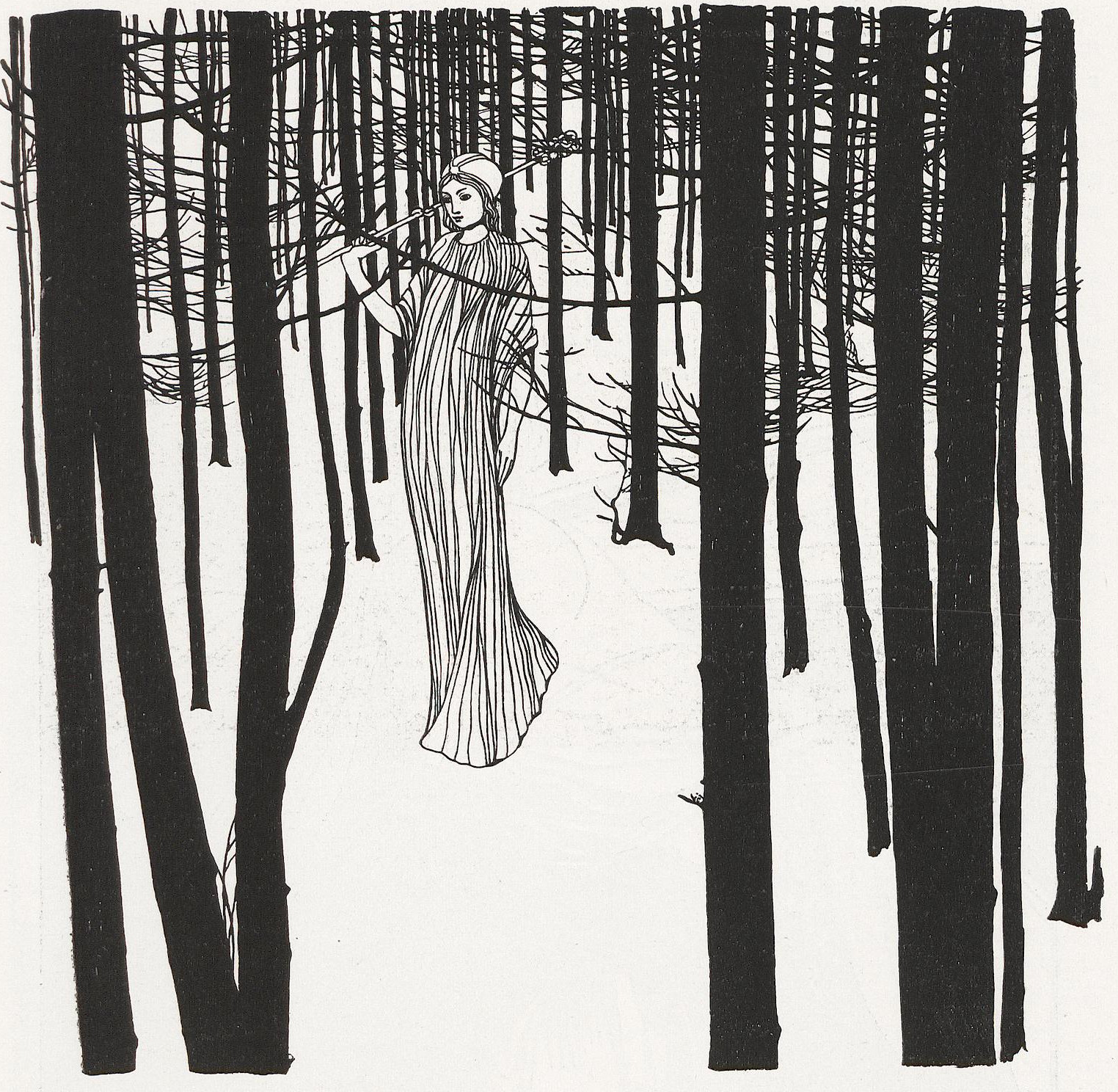
Fairy tale (1900)

Friedrich König (20 December 1857 in Vienna – 11 March 1941 in Vienna) was an Austrian painter, illustrator and designer.

== Life ==
König was the son of a Viennese postman. He spent two years at the Vienna Kunstgewerbeschule, then studied at the Academy of Fine Arts, Vienna between 1878 and 1883 under Christian Griepenkerl, August Eisenmenger and Carl von Blaas before going to study at the Academy of Fine Arts Munich, and then visiting Italy, Germany, Spain and France. When he returned to Vienna, he worked as an illustrator, including contributing to The Austro-Hungarian Monarchy in Word and Picture.

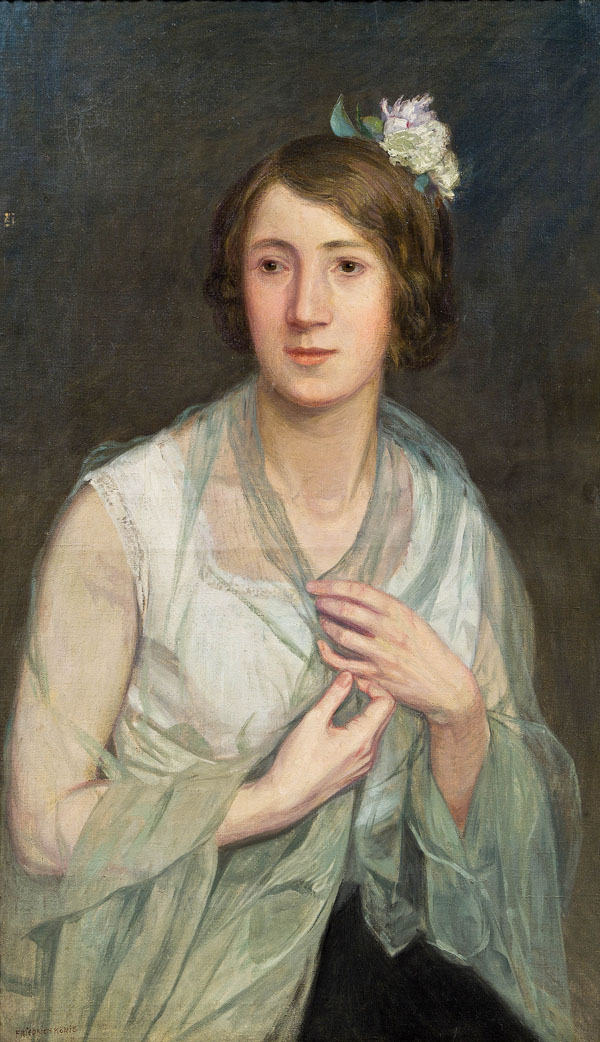
Picture of an elegant woman

In the 1890s, König was involved with the Hagen society, a loose Art Nouveau group that included several artists who would, König included, later found the Vienna Secession in 1897; he remained a Secessionist until his death. In 1900, he served on the group's working committee, and in 1902 he was vice-president. Within the Secession, he was close to Josef Engelhart, Rudolf Bacher and Maximilian Lenz. Ver Sacrum, the official Secession magazine, published many prints of his, and he provided the illustrations for an issue in 1899, and edited the journal for much of that year.

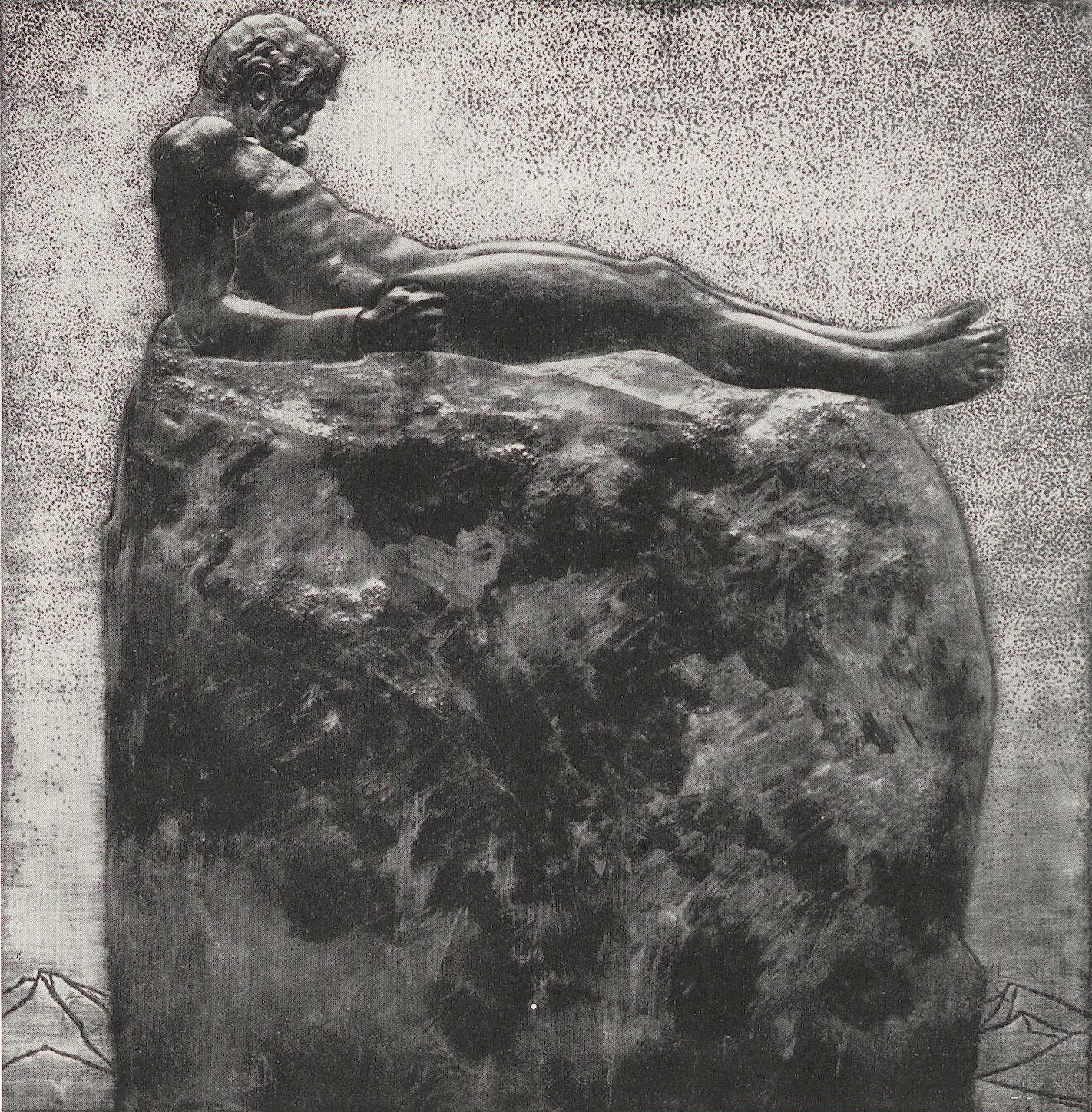
Prometheus (1902). Shown at the 'Beethoven Exhibition'

He exhibited many times with the Secession; for the group's first exhibition, he designed the interior decoration. At the group's winter exhibition in 1898, he was noted for "fine, tinted studies" and watercolours, and at the spring exhibition of 1899 his paintings formed part of an "impressive selection". At the 'Beethoven Exhibition' of 1902, König showed an "adorable" copper plate and a mortar sculpture. In 1929, he was the oldest member of the Secession; he was honoured with an exhibition of his works.

König taught at the Kunstschule für Frauen und Mädchen (Art School for Women and Young Women) between 1902 and 1916, teaching a class on wood engraving. Other teachers at the school included Georg Klimt (brother of Gustav), and fellow Secessionists Hans Tichy and Adolf Böhm. Along with many other prominent Secessionists, he was a friend of Broncia Koller, and frequently visited her and her husband's home. König also encouraged and taught Martha Hofrichter in the art of woodcut printing.

== Style ==
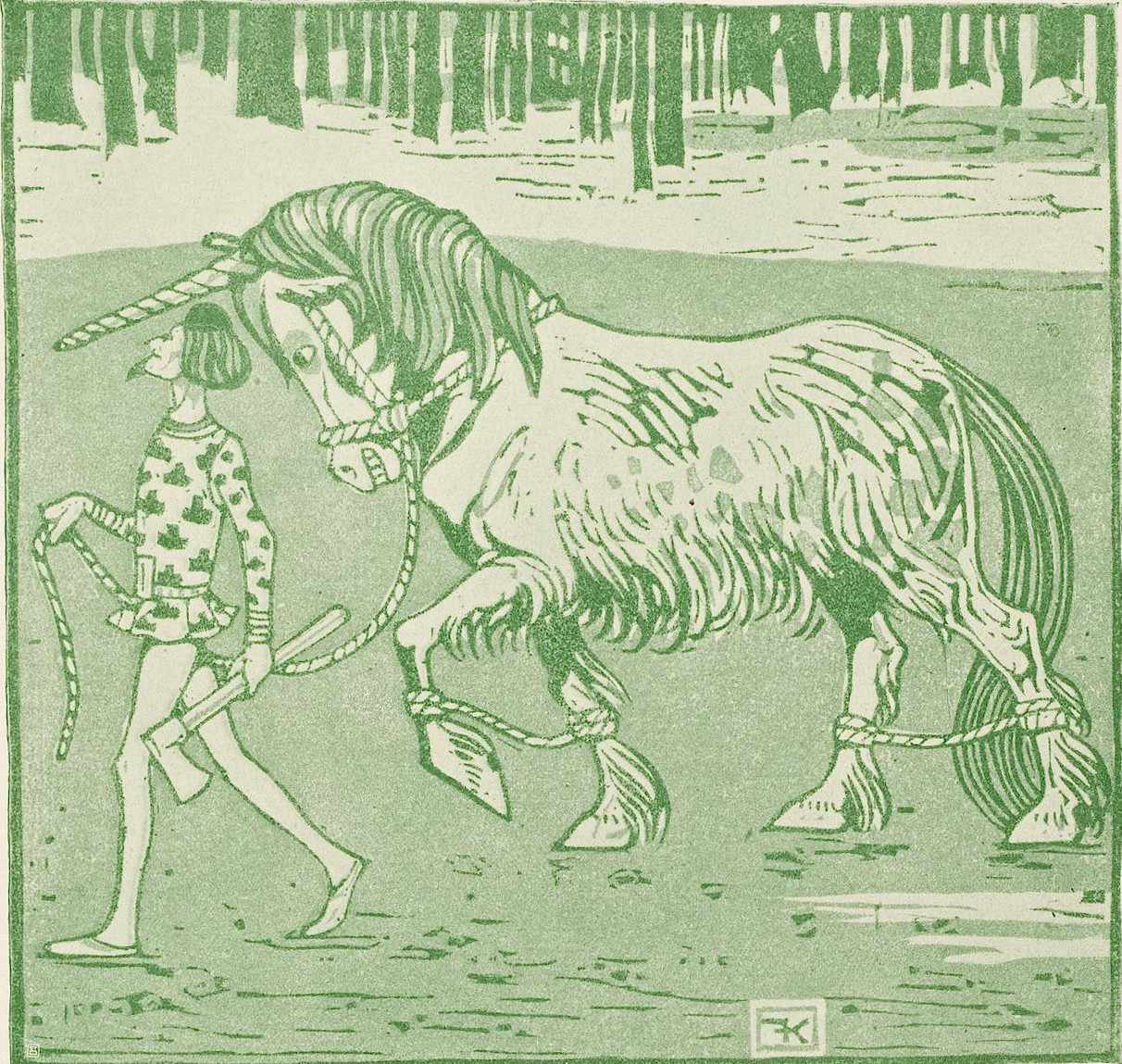
The Brave Little Tailor (1908)

König did much work as a graphic designer; he also embossed and painted in oils. He had particular skill for decorative work and for dealing with large-scale figurative images and landscapes—his paintings were not economic with detail, but beautifully ornamented and softly atmospheric, in contrast to his starker style of woodcuts. His style tended towards Romanticism. In some of his woodcuts for Ver Sacrum, he introduced elements of Japonism.

Engelhart wrote, "Any viewer standing in front of Friedrich König's paintings feels instantly that this is a deeply internal artist, a painter savoring nature with almost feminine tenderness, a poet using pen and brush to narrate his dreams."

== Exhibitions ==
- Tenth Exhibition of the Vienna Secession, 1901, showing Erntezeit and Dorfkirche am Teich
- International Hunting Exhibition, Vienna, 1910.
- International Arts Exhibition, Rome, 1911.

== Selected works ==
- Untitled (seated nude), c. 1902, woodcut on paper, 14.12 x 13.17 cm, Los Angeles County Museum of Art (accession number: 83.1.610l)
- Untitled (flying woman), c.1902, woodcut on paper, 15.08 x 14.12 cm, Los Angeles County Museum of Art (accession number: 81.1.610j)
- Der stille Teich (The still pond), c. 1910, oil on canvas, 68 x 100 cm, Belvedere museum (inventory number: 4787).

== Bibliography ==
- Kuzmany, Karl M (1908). "Jüngere österreische Graphiker. II. Holzschnitt". Die Graphischen Künste (31): 67–88.
- Stieglitz, Olga; Zeillinger, Gerhard; Suete-Willer, Hildegunde (2008). Der Bildhauer Richard Kauffungen (1854-1942): zwischen Ringstrasse, Künstlerhaus und Frauenkunstschule. Peter Lang. ISBN 978-3631522035.
- "König, Friedrich". Die deutschsprachige Presse: Ein biographisch-bibliographisches Handbuch. Walter de Gruyter. 2005. p. 564.
