= Juha Holopainen =

Finnish freestyle skier

Personal information
- Nationality: Finnish
- Born: 4 September 1970 (age 54); Nurmes, Finland

Sport
- Sport: Freestyle skiing

Juha Holopainen (born 4 September 1970) is a Finnish freestyle skier. He competed in the men's moguls event at the 1994 Winter Olympics.
