= Aqyus =

Aqyus الاقيوس
- Sub-district
- Location in Yemen
- Coordinates: 13°46′42″N 43°55′42″E
- Country: Yemen
- Governorate: Taiz Governorate
- District: Shar'ab as-Salam District

Population (2004)
  - Total: 5,476
- Time zone: UTC+3

Aqyus (Arabic: الاقيوس) is a sub-district in the Shar'ab as-Salam District, Taiz Governorate, Yemen. Aqyus had a population of 5,476 at the 2004 census.
