= Al-Akrūf =

Al-Akrūf الأكروف
- Sub-district
- Location in Yemen
- Coordinates: 13°49′10″N 43°52′49″E
- Country: Yemen
- Governorate: Taiz Governorate
- District: Shar'ab as-Salam District

Population (2004)
  - Total: 7,551
- Time zone: UTC+3

Al-Akrūf (Arabic: الأكروف) is a sub-district of the Shar'ab as-Salam District, in Taiz Governorate, Yemen. At the 2004 census, Al-Akrūf had a population of 7,551.

== Villages ==
- Al-zahira village.
- Al-muasis village.
- Wadi Al-hajar village.
- Al-quruduhah village.
- Al-mudawrah village.
