= Shar'ab as-Salam district =

Coordinates: 13.7831°N 43.8858°E

Shara'b as-Salam District مديرية شرعب السلام
- District
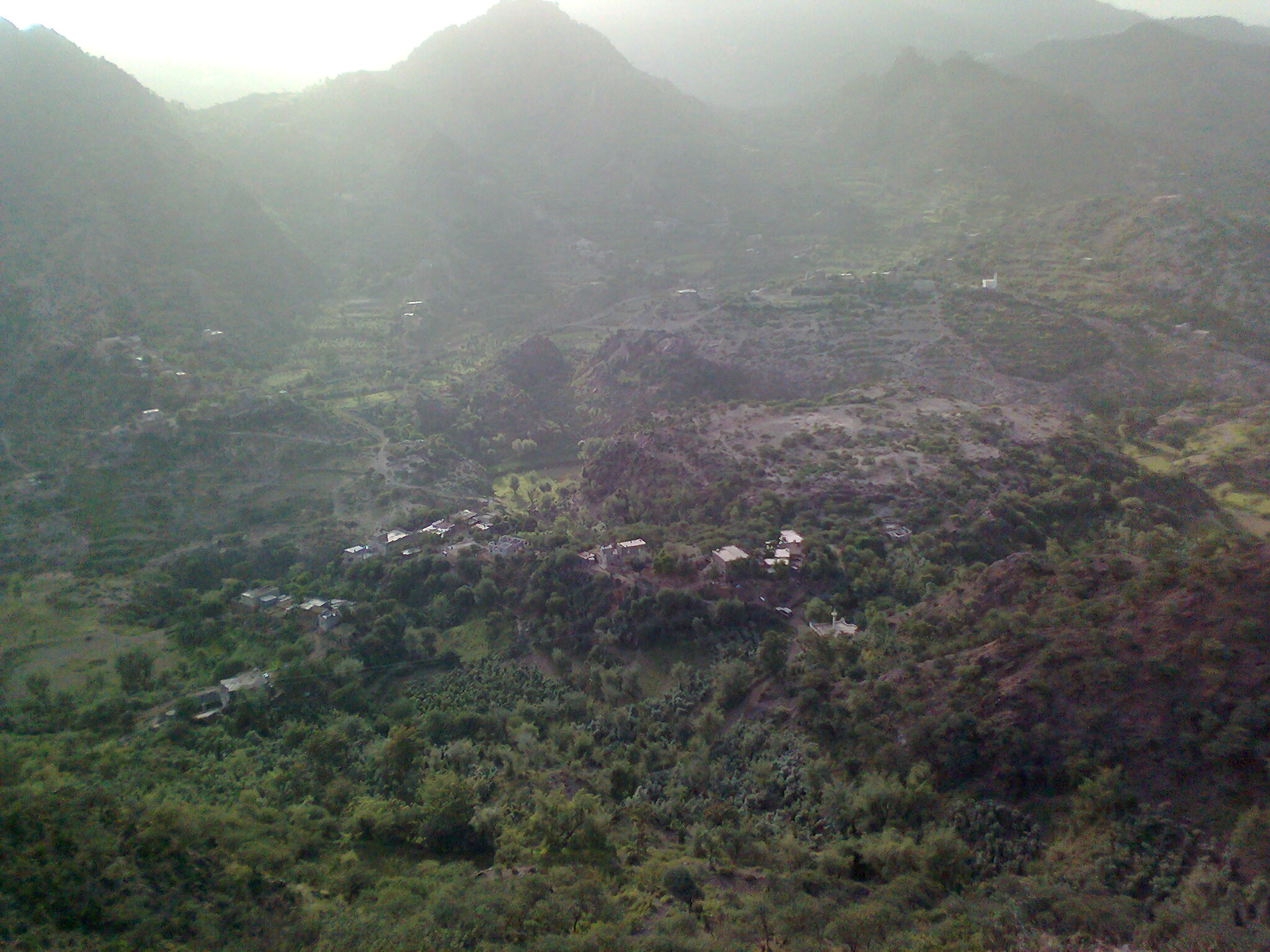
- A view of Shara'b as-Salam from Malat mount shows ‘Unshūq village
- Interactive map of Shara'b as-Salam District
- Country: Yemen
- Governorate: Taiz
- Seat: As-Salam (known as Suq ar Rabu' )

Area
  - Total: 210.1 km^{2} (81.1 sq mi)

Population (2003)
  - Total: 146,650
  - Density: 591.8/km^{2} (1,533/sq mi)
- Time zone: UTC+3 (Yemen Standard Time)

Sharʿab as-Salam District (Arabic: مديرية شرعب السلام) is a district of the Taiz Governorate, Yemen. In 2003, the district had a population of 146,650.

== Etymology ==
Sharʿab as-Salam is part of the Sharʿab Mikhlaf that includes both Shar'ab As Salam and Sharʿab Ar Rawnah. The Mikhlaf was founded by the tribe of Banu Shar‘ab which is a tribe from Himyar. According to al-Hamdani and Nashwan al-Himyari, it is descended from Shar'ab ibn Sahl ibn Zaid ibn ʿAmr ibn Qais ibn Jusham ibn Abd Shams ibn Wail ibn al-Ghwth ibn Katan ibn ʿUrib ibn Zuhir ibn Aiman ibn al-Hamaysaʿ ibn Ḥimyar. According to ibn al-Kalbi and ibn Khaldun, it is Shar'ab ibn Qais ibn Jusham ibn Abd Shams ibn Wail ibn al-Ghwth ibn Katan ibn ʿUrib ibn Zuhir ibn Aiman ibn al-Hamaysaʿ ibn Ḥimyar. According to ibn Sidah the word sharoob (Arabic: شرعوب) means "dates" in classical Arabic and Shar'ab means a tall person with a well shaped body. The Sharabi spears (Arabic: الرماح الشرعبية) and al-Shar'abiah cloaks (Arabic: البردة الشرعبية) are attributed to the tribe of Sharʿab.

== History ==
Sharʿab was one of the most controversial regions in Yemen. The people of Sharʿab were known for being rebellious and troublemakers. Thus, the government treated them poorly and didn't provide them water facilities. It was reported that the Imam of Yemen, Ahmad Hamidaddin once said: "If Sharʿab was in the borders I would have sold it".

The Himyarite prince of the Manakhis was killed in Wadi Nakhlah in Sharʿab region.

After the 26 September Revolution (1962–1970), the new rulers of Yemen decided to divide Sharʿab into two districts so it could be easily controlled. Sharʿab was divided into "East Sharʿab" with As-Salam region as its center, "West Sharʿab" with Ar-Ronah region as its center. The government didn't make any strategic or vital roads in Sharʿab. The government also created a pro-government small division in Sharʿab called al-Mikhlaf (Arabic: المخلاف) that served as a barrier between Sharʿab and the city of Taiz. The government gave people al-Mikhlaf many jobs and weapons.

The division of Sharʿab created political polarization between Sharʿab as-Salam (East Sharʿab) and Sharʿab Ar Rawnah (West Sharʿab). Sharʿab as-Salam became leftist communist while Sharʿab Ar Rawnah supported the al-Islah party in Yemen which is a Yemeni Salafi party. A war later occurred called Harb al-Jabhah between Sharʿab as-Salam on one side and Sharʿab Ar Rawnah with the government on the other. The war was part of NDF Rebellion. Libyan ruler Muammar Gaddafi supported Sharʿab as-Salam and gave them landmines. The mines were planted in many places in Sharʿab. The war ended after 4 years in a victory for the government, which took control of Sharʿab as-Salam. The war of Jabhah weakened the people of Sharʿab.

In the 2011 crisis in Yemen, the people of al-Mikhlaf took over the city of Taiz after fighting that was more deadly than the fighting in the capital. The Sheikh of al-Mikhlaf, Hamoud Saeed al-Mikhlafi, become the leader of Taiz. Most people of the city of Taiz supported and loved al-Mikhlafi leadership. After the crisis ended, Hamoud Saeed al-Mikhlafi gave the leadership of Taiz to the new government but he was still popular among the people of Taiz.

After the Houthis attacked the city of Taiz in 2015, Hamoud Saeed al-Mikhlafi returned and fought in the frontlines against the Houthis. The death toll of Houthis who were killed by al-Mikhlafi forces was higher than those who were killed by the government and Saudi-led coalition airstrikes. According to some witnesses, the Houthis bodies were daily transferred from Taiz to Dhamar and 'Amran. Taiz was the only city in north Yemen that the Houthis were not able to control.

The people of Shurrab fought in the war and mostly fought with al-Mikhlafi against al-Houthi.

Al-Mikhlafi's son and brother were killed in the battles with Al-Houthi Al-Mikhlafi then traveled to Turkey. According to al-Mikhlafi, he left after he realised that the Saudi-led coalition was attacking his troops and not supporting him with weapons. He said that this is mainly because the U.A.E. accuses him of being part of the Muslim Brotherhood movement which he denies.

After al-Mikhlafi left Taiz, a teenage warlord, Ghazwan al-Mikhlafi who is also from the al-Mikhlaf region took control of Taiz city and is also fighting against the al-Qaeda-linked militia in Taiz. However, Ghazwan was not beloved by the people of Taiz city. He is said to be controlling Taiz with fear and his militia are terrorising people. According to the Middle East Eye, Critics of Ghazwan are often frightened of openly confronting him. International and regional NEO refused to discuss his practices with the Middle East Eye. It is often from outside the city of Taiz that he is criticized.

== Location ==
A map shows districts of Taiz

Shar'ab As Salam is located in the north of Taiz government and to north west of Taiz city. It is bordered by Ibb to the north, At Ta'iziyah district and Shar'ab Ar Rawnah district to the south, Mudhaykhirah district and At Ta'iziyah district to the east, Shar'ab Ar Rawnah to the west.

== Sub-districts of Shar'ab As Salam ==
Rural districts in Yemen are divided into 'Uzaal (Sub-districts) while Uzaal are divided into villages. There are eighteen Uzaal in Shar'ab As Salam. In the post-Ottoman Empire administrative divisions, Sharʿab was mostly part of a province called Kaza al-ʿUdayn (Arabic: قضاء العدين) and was part of Ibb region.

- Al-Qufa'ah
- Aqyus
- Al-Ahjur
- At-Tibhah
- Al-Ashmus
- Banī 'Awn
- Ayfū' Ala'
- Al-Amjūd
- Banī Saba'
- Ayfū' Asfal
- Al-Akrūf
- Banī Sha'b
- Banī Assela
- Banī Bahir
- Banī Wahban
- Ash-Shurayf
- 'Izbān
- Az-Zawhah

== Sharʿabi Jews ==
There was a large Jewish community in Sharʿab as-Salam. The community is believed to have existed in Yemen as early as circa 130 CE until its demise around 1940. Sharʿab as-Salam was considered one of the most illustrious places of Jewish settlement in Yemen. Many distinguished Jewish personalities were born there, including the rabbis Shalom Sharabi, Mordechai Sharabi and Shalom Shabazi. It was an important place of Torah learning, and home to many Yeshivot and schools. It had a population of over 10,000 Jews and was a major industrial centre of Yemen, where goldsmiths' work, weaving, commerce, silk trading and shoemaking were the main industries of the day. The Sharabi Jews have a slightly different pronunciation than most other Yemenite Jews.

== Notable people ==
- Abdulmalik Al-Mekhlafi, Yemeni politician who served as Deputy Prime Minister and Foreign Minister of Yemen
- Tawakkol Karman, Nobel Peace Prize laureate
