= Al-Amjūd =

Al-Amjūd الأمجود
- Sub-district
- Location in Yemen
- Coordinates: 13°51′24″N 43°49′56″E
- Country: Yemen
- Governorate: Taiz Governorate
- District: Shar'ab as-Salam District

Population (2004)
  - Total: 18,322
- Time zone: UTC+3

Al-Amjūd (Arabic: الأمجود) is a sub-district located of the Shar'ab as-Salam District, in Taiz Governorate, Yemen. Al-Amjūd had a population of 18,322 at the 2004 census.

== Villages ==
- Wadiha Al-suflaa (lower Wadiha) village.
- Al-jabiruh village.
- Wadiha Al-'ulya (upper Wadiha) village.
- Banī Abdallah al-Suflaa (lower Banī Abdallah) village.
- Al-a'ruq village.
- Al-afrad village.
- Banī Qasim village.
- Al-madaqah village.
- Tabasha' village.
- Banī Salah village.
- Al-sana' village.
- Banī Abdallah Al-'ulya (upper Banī Abdullah) village.
- Nsf Banī Almujidi village.
