= Troy Benson (skier) =

American freestyle skier (born 1970)

Personal information
- Born: June 8, 1970 (age 56) Minneapolis, Minnesota, United States

Sport
- Sport: Freestyle skiing

Troy Benson (born June 8, 1970) is an American freestyle skier. He competed in the men's moguls event at the 1994 Winter Olympics.
