= Gedaliah Aharon Koenig =

Breslover Rabbi

- גדליהו אהרון קניג
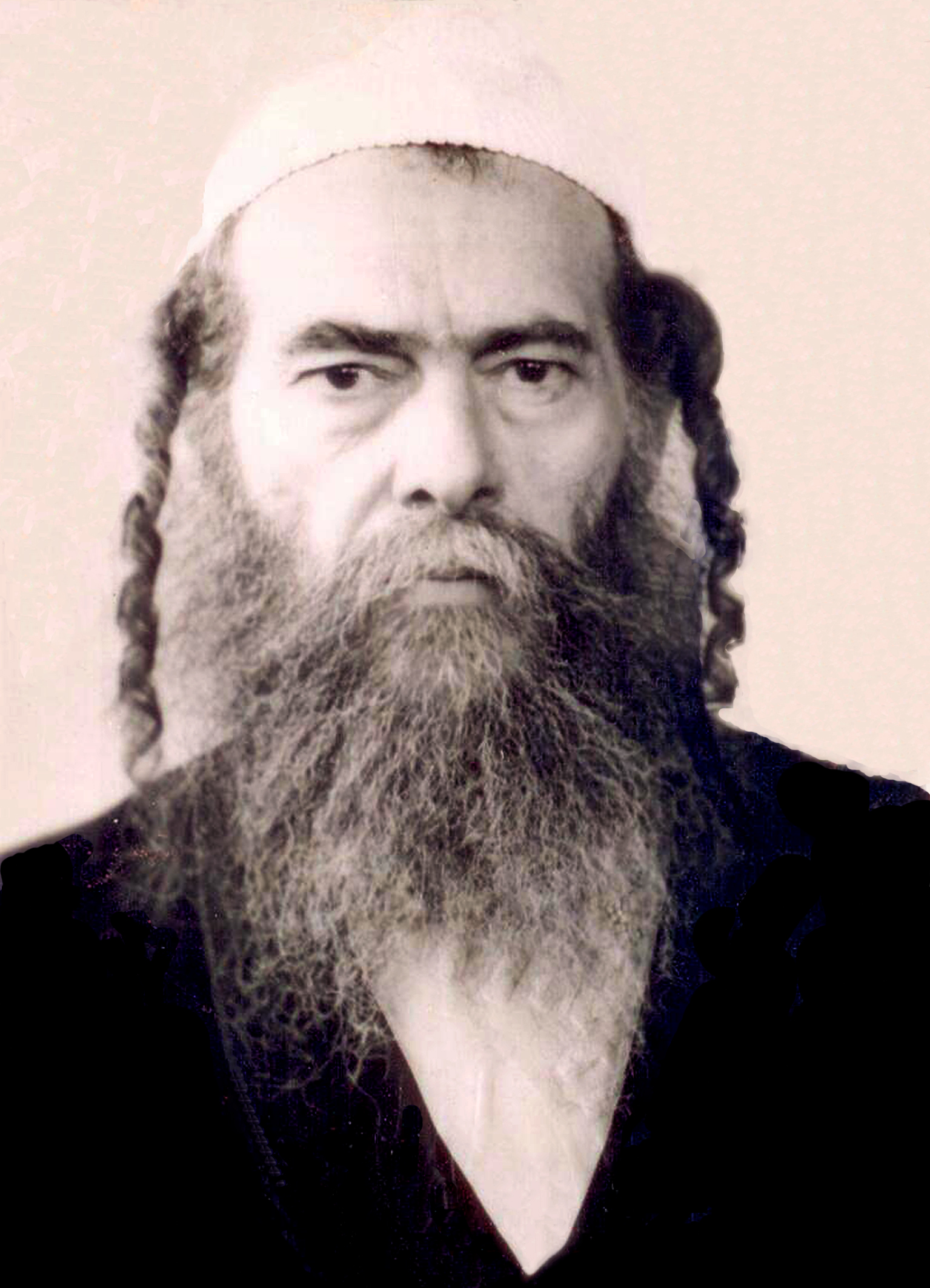
- Koenig c. 1980
- Born: May 5, 1921; Jerusalem, Mandatory Palestine
- Died: July 7, 1980 (aged 58–59); Manchester, England

Gedaliah Aharon Koenig (Hebrew: גדליהו אהרון קניג; 5 May 1921 – 7 July 1980), an Israeli rabbi and Breslover Hasid in Jerusalem, Israel, was the driving force behind the establishment of the Breslov community in Safed, which was led by his son, Rabbi Elazar Mordechai Koenig, and now by another son, Rabbi Ephraim Koenig.

== Biography ==
Born in the Old City of Jerusalem, Koenig became a Chabad Hasid during his teens. He was drawn to Breslov by Rabbi Abraham Sternhartz, a key figure in the chain of transmission of Breslov teachings from the early generations of the movement to the later ones. Sternhartz was the great-grandson of Reb Noson Sternhartz, the leading disciple of Rebbe Nachman of Breslov. Sternhartz immigrated from Uman, Ukraine to Jerusalem in 1936 and taught many students, producing Breslov leaders for coming generations. Koenig became one of Sternhartz's leading disciples.

At age 18, Koenig married Esther Yehudit, the daughter of Rabbi Dovid Moshe Ehrentrau of Jerusalem. His mentor, Abraham Sternhartz, performed the wedding ceremony.

When the Jews of the Old City were expelled by Jordanian forces during the 1948 Arab-Israeli War, Koenig followed Sternhartz to the neighborhood of Katamon. He eventually made his home in Meah Shearim.

It was Sternhartz who entrusted Koenig with the mission of establishing a Breslov community in Safed. Koenig gave his life for this cause, raising funds and working to establish this Torah center, beginning in 1967.

== Scholarship ==
In addition to his work on behalf of the Breslov community in Safed, Koenig was renowned for his encyclopedic knowledge of Breslov teachings and Kabbalah. He wrote Chayei Nefesh, a book explaining the meaning of binding oneself to the tzaddik (in response to the Nefesh HaChaim by Rabbi Chaim Volozhin), which was published during his lifetime, and left many unpublished manuscripts filled with chiddushim (new Torah thoughts) on Likutey Moharan, Rebbe Nachman's major work. His collected letters, entitled Shaarei Tzaddik ("Gates to the Righteous"), were published prior to Rosh Hashanah in 2012 (5773) in two volumes. The following year, another two volumes were published, and today there are a total of ten volumes. Other writings of Rabbi Koenig remain in manuscript.

Koenig's two-room home in Meah Shearim was always open to those seeking advice and counsel. He was known for his ability to connect with any Jew, no matter his age or background.

Koenig died in Manchester, England on 7 July 1980 (23 Tammuz 5740), while fund-raising on behalf of the Breslov community in Safed. (He shares the same yahrtzeit as Rabbi Moses ben Jacob Cordovero of Safed, with whom he felt a lifelong affinity.) His widow, Esther Yehudit, died on Shavuot day, 9 June 2008.
