= Antonina Ordina =

Soviet-Swedish cross-country skier

Personal information
- Nationality: Sweden
- Born: 24 January 1962 (age 64) Naryan-Mar, Russian SSR, Soviet Union

Sport
- Sport: Skiing
- Club: SK Tegsnäspojkarna

World Cup career
- Seasons: 12 – (1985–1989, 1994–1995, 1997–2001)
- Indiv. starts: 74
- Indiv. podiums: 8
- Indiv. wins: 0
- Team starts: 19
- Team podiums: 5
- Team wins: 2
- Overall titles: 0 – (10th in 1999)
- Discipline titles: 0
Medal record
Women's cross-country skiing
World Championships
Representing the Soviet Union
Gold medal – first place	1987 Oberstdorf	4 × 5 km relay
Representing Sweden
Bronze medal – third place	1995 Thunder Bay	30 km freestyle
Bronze medal – third place	1995 Thunder Bay	4 × 5 km relay

Antonina Ordina (Russian: Антонина Ордина, born 24 January 1962) is a Soviet/Swedish former cross-country skier who competed at international level from 1985 to 2002. In the Soviet Union she trained at Dynamo in Kalinin. She won three medals at the FIS Nordic World Ski Championships, with a gold in the 4 × 5 km relay (1987 and bronzes in the 30 km and the 4 × 5 km relay (both 1995).

Ordina's best individual finish at the Winter Olympics was seventh in the 15 km event at Lillehammer in 1994. She also has nineteen victories at various levels in various distances from 1992 to 2002.

She became a Swedish citizen in 1994. She graduated from the Swedish Police Academy in 2007 and works as a police officer in Karlstad, Värmland County.

== Cross-country skiing results ==
All results are sourced from the International Ski Federation (FIS).

=== Olympic Games ===
Year	Age	5 km	15 km	Pursuit	30 km	4 × 5 km relay
1994	32	10	7	9	11	6
1998	36	24	19	19	11	8

=== World Championships ===
- 3 medals – (1 gold, 2 bronze)

Year	Age	5 km	10 km	15 km	Pursuit	20 km	30 km	4 × 5 km relay
1985	23	18	—	—N/a	—N/a	—	—N/a	—
1987	25	23	—	—N/a	—N/a	9	—N/a	Gold
1995	33	10	—N/a	14	6	—N/a	Bronze	Bronze
1997	35	7	—N/a	21	8	—N/a	18	9
1999	37	13	—N/a	9	7	—N/a	DNF	8

=== World Cup ===
==== Season standings ====
Season	Age				
Season	Age	Overall	Long Distance	Middle Distance	Sprint
1985	23	13	—N/a	—N/a	—N/a
1986	24	33	—N/a	—N/a	—N/a
1987	25	11	—N/a	—N/a	—N/a
1988	26	14	—N/a	—N/a	—N/a
1989	27	22	—N/a	—N/a	—N/a
1994	32	14	—N/a	—N/a	—N/a
1995	33	12	—N/a	—N/a	—N/a
1997	35	16	34	—N/a	17
1998	36	16	26	—N/a	13
1999	37	10	16	—N/a	7
2000	38	31	29	23	43
2001	39	85	—N/a	—N/a	—

==== Individual podiums ====
- 8 podiums

No.	Season	Date	Location	Race	Level	Place
1	1984–85	13 December 1984	Val di Sole, Italy	5 km Individual	World Cup	2nd
2	1986–87	28 February 1987	Lahti, Finland	5 km Individual F	World Cup	3rd
3	1987–88	16 December 1987	(Socialist Federal Republic of Yugoslavia) Bohinj, Yugoslavia	10 km Individual F	World Cup	3rd
4	1987–88	9 January 1988	Leningrad, Soviet Union	10 km Individual C	World Cup	3rd
5	1994–95	18 March 1995	Thunder Bay, Canada	30 km Individual F	World Championships^{[1]}	3rd
6	1998–99	12 December 1998	Toblach, Italy	5 km Individual F	World Cup	2nd
7	1998–99	13 December 1998	Toblach, Italy	10 km Individual C	World Cup	3rd
8	1998–99	5 January 1999	Otepää, Estonia	10 km Individual C	World Cup	2nd

==== Team podiums ====
- 2 victories
- 5 podiums

No.	Season	Date	Location	Race	Level	Place	Teammates
1	1986–87	17 February 1987	Oberstdorf, West Germany	4 × 5 km Relay F	World Championships^{[1]}	1st	Gavrylyuk / Lazutina / Reztsova
2	1986–87	1 March 1987	Lahti, Finland	4 × 5 km Relay C/F	World Cup	1st	Lazutina / Välbe / Reztsova
3	1993–94	13 March 1994	Falun, Sweden	4 × 5 km Relay F	World Cup	3rd	Frithioff / Östlund / Frost
4	1994–95	13 March 1994	Thunder Bay, Canada	4 × 5 km Relay C/F	World Championships^{[1]}	3rd	Frithioff / Östlund / Fanqvist
5	1994–95	16 December 2000	Sapporo, Japan	4 × 5 km Relay C/F	World Cup	3rd	Frithioff / Östlund / Fanqvist

Note: ^{1} Until the 1999 World Championships and the 1994 Olympics, World Championship and Olympic races were included in the World Cup scoring system.
