= Tord Wiksten =

Swedish biathlete (born 1971)

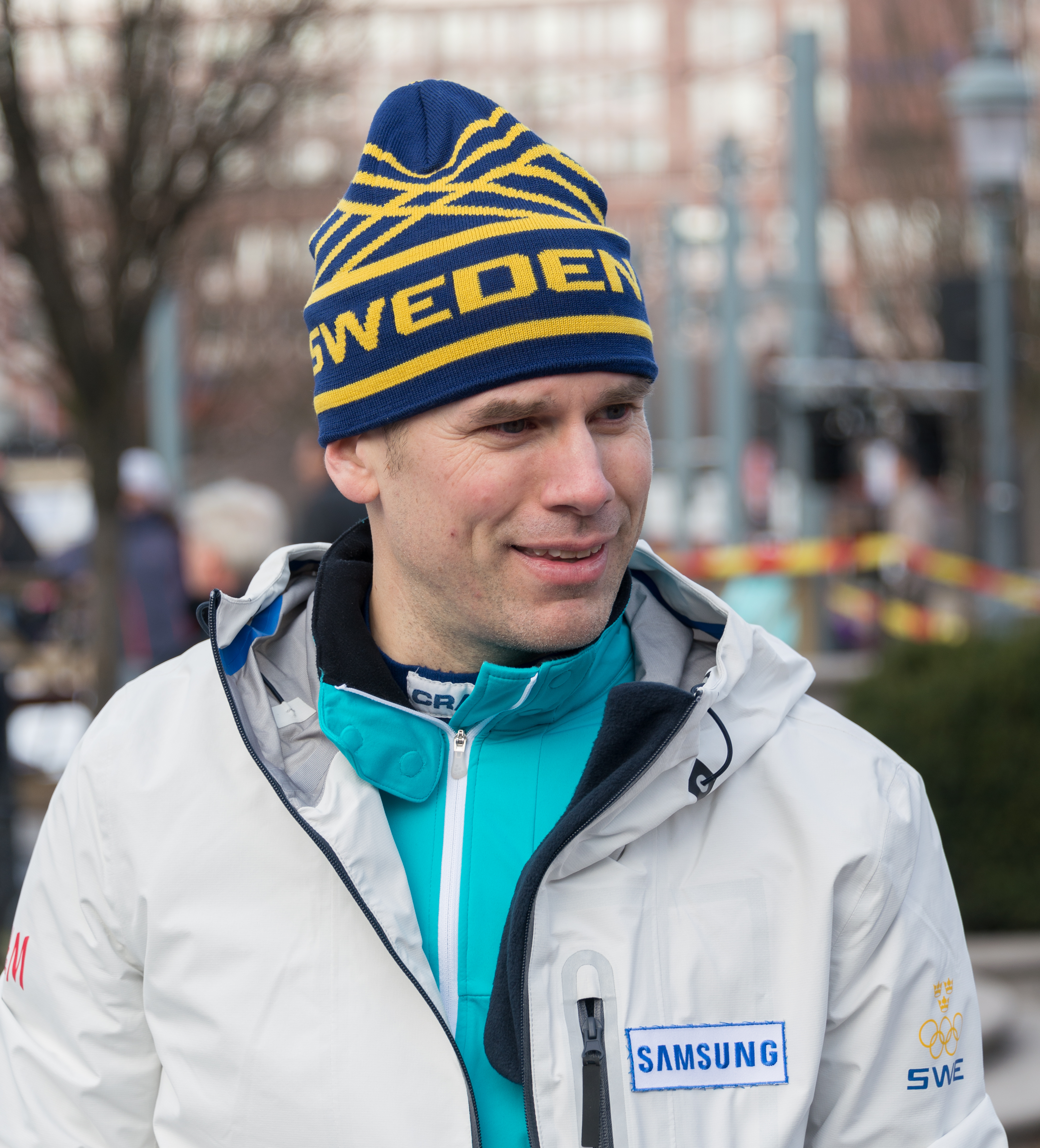

Medal record

Men's biathlon

Representing Sweden

Olympic Games
Bronze medal – third place	1992 Albertville	4 x 7.5 km relay

Tord Wiksten (born 30 June 1971 in Byske) is a former Swedish biathlete. At the 1992 Olympics in Albertville, Wiksten won a bronze medal in the 4 x 7.5 km relay with the Swedish team. His teammates were Mikael Löfgren, Ulf Johansson, and Leif Andersson.
