= Anders Jonell =

Swedish freestyle skier

Personal information
- Nationality: Swedish
- Born: 20 February 1973 (age 52); Skövde, Sweden

Sport
- Sport: Freestyle skiing

Anders Jonell (born 20 February 1973) is a Swedish freestyle skier. He competed in the men's moguls event at the 1994 Winter Olympics.
