= Gabriela König =

German politician (born 1952)

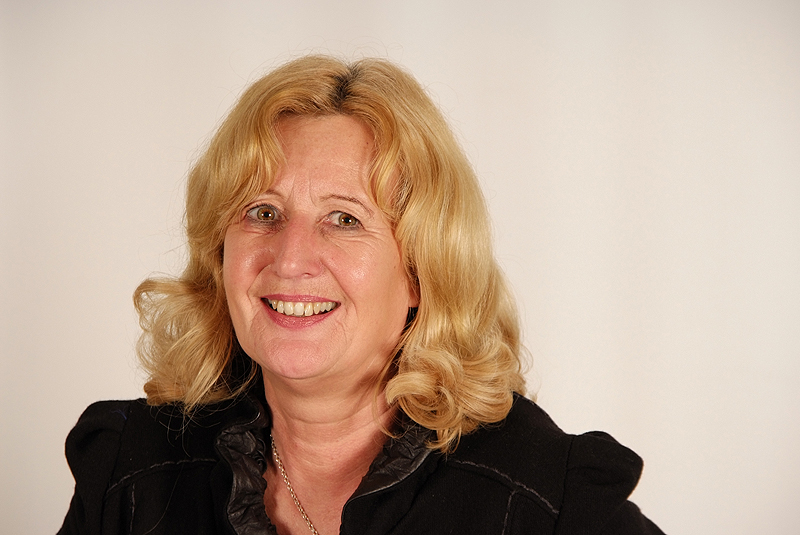
Gabriela König im November 2009

Gabriela König (born 8 October 1952 in Osnabrück) is a German politician for the Free Democratic Party.

She joined the Lower Saxon Landtag in 2005 as a replacement for Carsten Lehmann and has been re-elected on one occasion.
