= Hans Tichy =

Austrian painter (1861–1925)

- Born: July 27, 1861; Brno, Austrian Empire
- Died: October 28, 1925 (aged 64); Vienna, Austria

Hans Tichy (27 July 1861 in Brno – 28 October 1925 in Vienna) was an Austrian artist and a professor at the Academy of Fine Arts, Vienna.

He studied at the Academy of Fine Arts, Vienna from 1880 to 1884, under Christian Griepenkerl and August Eisenmenger. Tichy was also a student of the genre painter August von Pettenkofen.

He was a founding member of the Vienna Secession. He was elected to the presidency of the group in 1902. His painting, At the Fountain of Love, was exhibited with the group; it won him the Reichel Prize from the Academy, and it was bought by the Moderne Galerie (now the Österreichische Galerie Belvedere).

With Richard Kauffungen in 1900, he ran classes for a women's art school on drawing and painting from living models. In 1914, he was made a professor of the Vienna Academy.

== Exhibitions ==
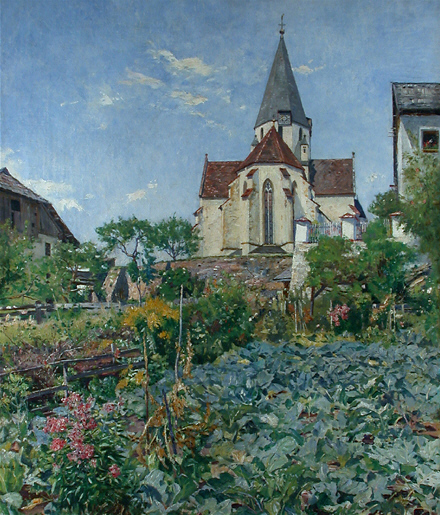
Garden and Church in Murau

- Second Great Berlin Art Exhibition, 1894.
- Fourth Exhibition of the Vienna Secession, 1899.
- Twentieth Exhibition of the Vienna Secession, 1904. Orpheus and Eurydice shown.
- Spring Exhibition of the Vienna Secession, 1906.
- Spring Exhibition of the Vienna Secession, 1908. At the Fountain of Love shown.
- Spring Exhibition of the Vienna Secession, 1910.
- International Art Exhibition, Rome, 1911.
- Winter Exhibition of the Munich Secession, 1912.

== Awards ==
- Reichel Prize, 1908; for the painting At the Fountain of Love.
