= Fredrik Gustafsson (academic) =

Swedish professor of sensor informatics

Fredrik Gustafsson (born 1964, in Krylbo) is a Swedish professor of sensor informatics at Linköping University.

== Background ==
Fredrik Gustafsson was born in Aneby, Sweden. In 1988 he obtained a Master of Science in Electrical Engineering and in 1992 a doctorate degree in automatic control, both at Linköping University. He was appointed professor of communication systems in 1999 and of sensor informatics in 2005 at Linköping University.

Gustafsson’s research interests are in stochastic signal processing, adaptive filtering and change detection, with applications to communication, vehicular, airborne and audio systems.

In 2004, he was awarded the Arnberg prize by the Royal Swedish Academy of Science (KVA), in 2007 he was elected member of the Royal Swedish Academy of Engineering Sciences (IVA) and in 2011 he received an award from SAAB in the name of former CEO, Åke Svensson.

He is an associate editor for EURASIP Journal on Applied Signal Processing and IEEE Transactions on Aerospace and Electronic Systems.
