= Anna Hermansson =

Swedish biathlete (born 1969)

Personal information
- Full name: Anna Maria Hermansson
- Nationality: Swedish
- Born: 18 June 1969 (age 55)

Sport
- Sport: Biathlon

Anna Maria Hermansson (born 18 June 1969) is a Swedish biathlete. She competed in two events at the 1992 Winter Olympics.
