= Anna Frithioff =

Swedish cross-country skier

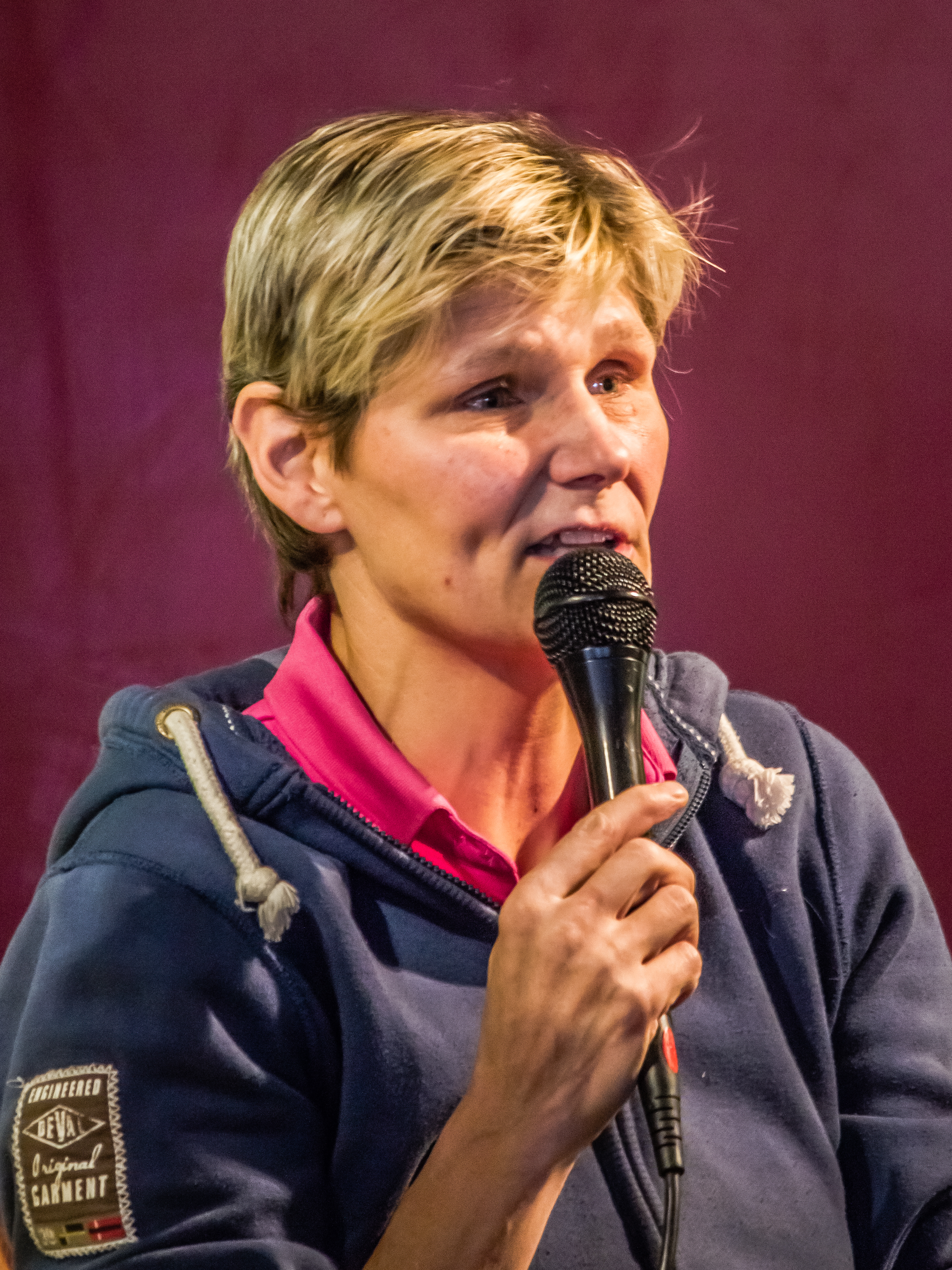
- Anna Frithioff in 2014

Personal information
- Full name: Anna Katarina Elisabet Johansson Frithioff
- Nationality: Sweden
- Born: 4 December 1962 Gränna, Sweden

Sport
- Sport: Skiing
- Club: Kvarnsvedens GoIF SK

World Cup career
- Seasons: 8 – (1992–1999)
- Indiv. starts: 30
- Indiv. podiums: 0
- Team starts: 11
- Team podiums: 3
- Team wins: 0
- Overall titles: 0 – (30th in 1992, 1994)
- Discipline titles: 0
Medal record
Women's cross-country skiing
Representing Sweden
World Championships
Bronze medal – third place	1995 Thunder Bay	4 × 5 km relay

Anna Frithioff (born 4 December 1962) is a Swedish cross-country skier who competed from 1992 to 1999. She won a bronze medal in the 4 × 5 km relay at the 1995 FIS Nordic World Ski Championships in Thunder Bay, and had her best individual finish of ninth in the 5 km event at those same championships.

Frithioff's best individual finish at the Winter Olympics was 13th in the 30 km event at Lillehammer in 1994. She also had two victories at FIS races in Sweden at 5 km (1995, 1998).

In 1991 and 1992, she won Tjejvasan.

== Cross-country skiing results ==
All results are sourced from the International Ski Federation (FIS).

=== Olympic Games ===
Year	Age	5 km	15 km	Pursuit	30 km	4 × 5 km relay
1994	31	17	—	37	13	6

=== World Championships ===
- 1 medal – (1 bronze)

Year	Age	5 km	15 km	Pursuit	30 km	4 × 5 km relay
1993	30	24	—	DNS	—	6
1995	32	9	22	29	—	Bronze
1997	34	13	—	39	19	9
1999	36	24	—	54	DNF	8

=== World Cup ===
==== Season standings ====
Season	Age	Overall	Long Distance	Sprint
1992	30	30	—N/a	—N/a
1993	31	58	—N/a	—N/a
1994	32	30	—N/a	—N/a
1995	33	32	—N/a	—N/a
1996	34	42	—N/a	—N/a
1997	35	45	NC	—
1998	36	59	NC	52
1999	37	54	NC	58

==== Team podiums ====
- 3 podiums

No.	Season	Date	Location	Race	Level	Place	Teammates
1	1993–94	13 March 1994	Falun, Sweden	4 × 5 km Relay F	World Cup	3rd	Westin / Ordina / Frost
2	1994–95	17 March 1995	Thunder Bay, Canada	4 × 5 km Relay C/F	World Championships^{[1]}	3rd	Westin / Ordina / Fanqvist
3	1994–95	26 March 1995	Sapporo, Japan	4 × 5 km Relay C/F	World Cup	3rd	Westin / Ordina / Fanqvist

Note: ^{1} Until the 1999 World Championships, World Championship races were included in the World Cup scoring system.
