= Bo König =

Swedish speed skater

Personal information
- Full name: Nils Bo Anders
- Nationality: Swedish
- Born: 31 May 1965 (age 59); Askersund, Sweden
- Relatives: Ove König (brother)

Sport
- Sport: Speed skating

Nils Bo Anders König (born 31 May 1965) is a Swedish speed skater. He competed in three events at the 1992 Winter Olympics.
