= Mia Stadig =

Swedish biathlete (born 1966)

Personal information
- Full name: Ann-Marie Lillemor "Mia" Stadig
- Nationality: Swedish
- Born: 18 March 1966 (age 59)

Sport
- Sport: Biathlon

Ann-Marie Lillemor "Mia" Stadig (born 18 March 1966) is a Swedish biathlete. She competed in three events at the 1992 Winter Olympics.
