= Elazar Mordechai Koenig =

Israeli rabbi (1945–2018)

- אלעזר מרדכי קעניג
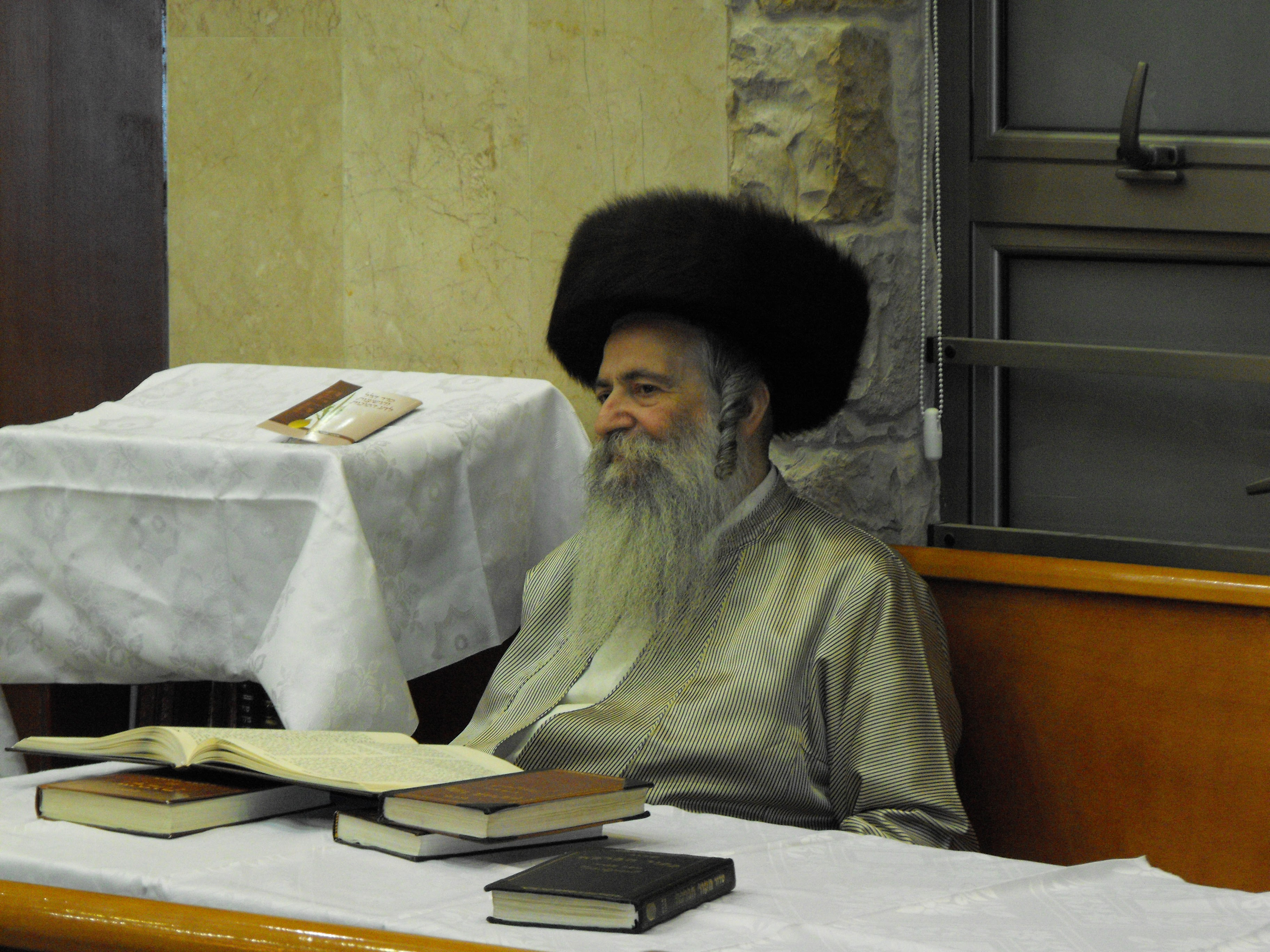
- Born: October 15, 1945; Jerusalem, Israel
- Died: December 31, 2018 (aged 73); Safed, Israel
- Resting place: Safed, Israel
- Organization: Nachal Novea Mekor Chochma
- Title: Rabbi
- Spouse: Chaya (Berger) Koenig
- Children: 7 sons, 6 daughters
- Parent(s): Gedaliah Aharon Koenig, Esther Yehudit Koenig

Elazar Mordechai Koenig (Hebrew: אלעזר מרדכי קניג; October 15, 1945 – December 31, 2018) was an Orthodox Jewish rabbi and the spiritual leader of the Breslov Hasidic community in Safed, Israel.

== Early life ==
Elazar Mordechai Koenig was born in Jerusalem to Rabbi Gedaliah Aharon Koenig and his wife Esther Yehudit Koenig. His father was a leading disciple of Breslov elder Rabbi Abraham Sternhartz, who immigrated to Jerusalem from Uman, Ukraine in 1936.

Koenig was an alumnus of the Mir Yeshiva in Jerusalem. He studied kabbalah with his father as well as with several leading Sephardic masters, including Rabbi Mordechai Sharabi.

== Breslov leader ==
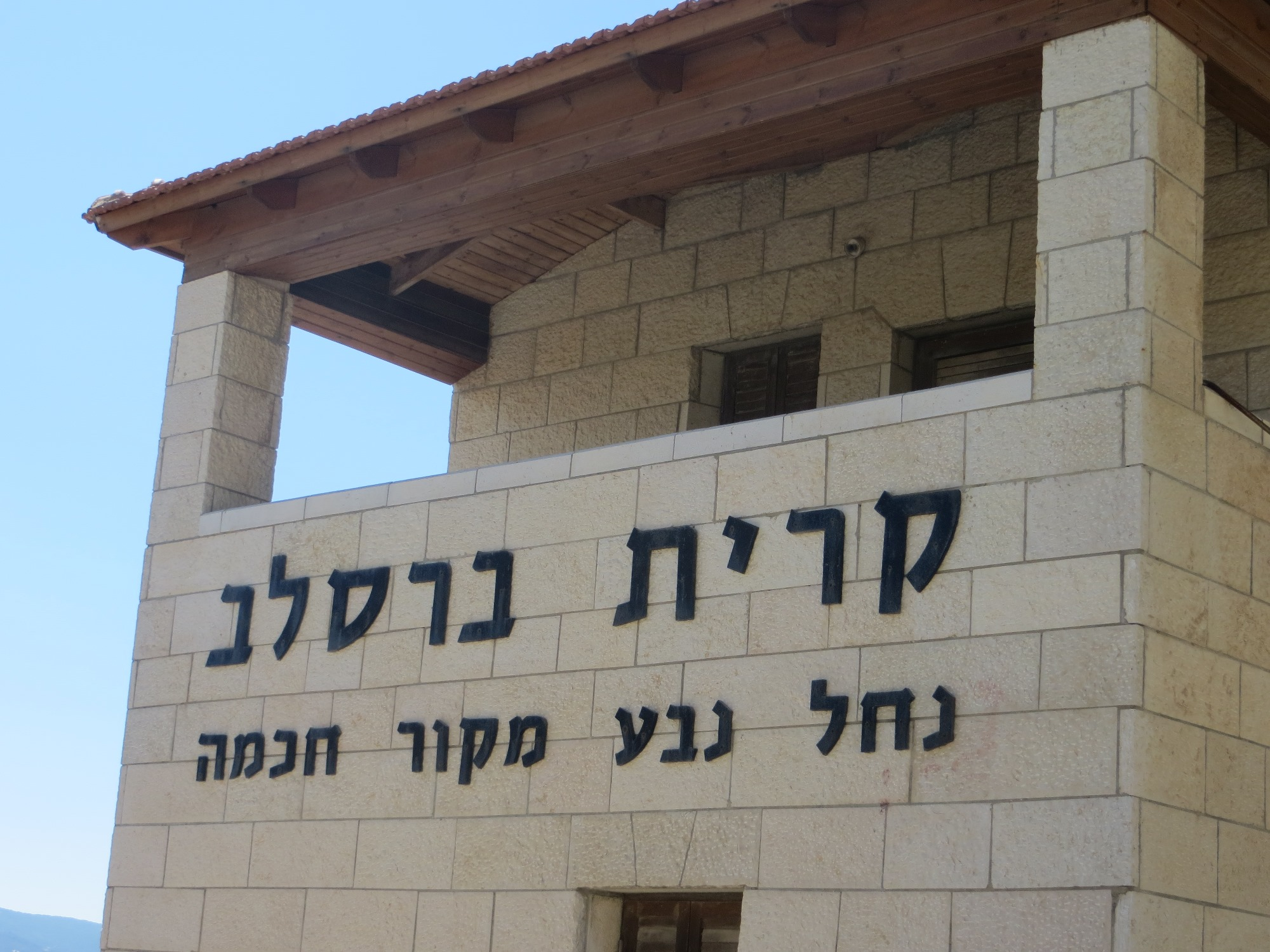
Kiryat Breslov housing complex

In 1967, his father, with the encouragement of Rabbi Sternhartz, founded the Breslov community in Safed and dedicated himself to fundraising for the expansion of this Torah center. Upon his father's unexpected death in 1980, Koenig and his two brothers built up the Breslov Safed complex to include a synagogue, preschool, Talmud Torah, yeshiva ketana, and kollel.

As of 2014, the Safed Breslov community comprised 250 families. Koenig was the leader of this community as well as of its umbrella organization, Nachal Novea Mekor Chochma. The organizations institutions include; Kiryat Breslev (a religious housing complex), a kollel, Yeshiva ketana, Talmud Torah Magen Avot, Ganei and Derech Yehudit Education Center for Girls, a daycare center for working mothers, Lilmod U'lamed Special Education School, the historic Trisk Synagogue in Safed's Old City, and a five-story Torah Center.

After suffering for many years from pulmonary fibrosis of unknown origin, Koenig underwent lung transplant surgery on January 15, 2005, at Manhattan's Columbia-Presbyterian Hospital. Koenig died on December 31, 2018, at the age of 73 following declining health due to cancer.

== Influence beyond Safed ==
In 1997 Koenig founded the Breslov Center for Spirituality and Inner Growth, which organizes classes on the teachings of Rebbe Nachman of Breslov, lectures, musical events, and retreats in the Greater New York area. He also sponsored the annual Breslov Rosh Hashana gathering in Meron for Hasidim unable to travel to Uman.
