= Fredrik Thulin =

Swedish freestyle skier

Personal information
- Nationality: Swedish
- Born: 14 November 1972 (age 52); Åre, Sweden

Sport
- Sport: Freestyle skiing

Fredrik Thulin (born 14 November 1972) is a Swedish freestyle skier. He competed in the men's moguls event at the 1994 Winter Olympics.
