= Adolf Böhm =

Bohemian historian

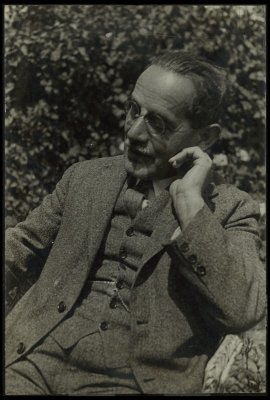
- Adolf Böhm in 1930
- Born: 20 January 1873; Teplitz, Kingdom of Bohemia
- Died: 4 April 1941 (aged 68); Hartheim Euthanasia Centre, Alkoven, Ostmark (Austria)
- Spouse: Olga Lemberger

Adolf Böhm (Yiddish: אַדאָלף בעהם, Hebrew: אדולף ביהם; 20 January 1873 – 4 April 1941) was a Bohemian-born Zionist historian and leader. He was murdered in the Nazi euthanasia programme at the Hartheim Euthanasia Centre in 1941.

== Biography ==
Adolf Böhm was born to an assimilated Jewish family in Teplitz, Bohemia. He moved at a young age with his family to Vienna, where his father established a successful textile factory and put his son to work in the family business. Böhm was an active member of the socialist Austrian Fabian Society, but turned to Zionism in 1905.

Böhm participated in the Conference of Austrian Zionists in Krakow in 1906, and the Zionist Congress in The Hague the following year. Following a visit to Palestine in 1907, Böhm became a leader of the Practical Zionist faction of the Zionist movement, serving as board member of the Zionist General Council, the Israelitische Kultusgemeinde Wien and the Jewish National Fund. Böhm published Die Zionistische Bewegung (1922, enlarged two-volume edition 1935–37), an exhaustive history of the Zionist movement up to 1925, and edited the German monthly Palästina from 1910 until the annexation of Austria into Nazi Germany in 1938.

He was murdered by the Hartheim Euthanasia Centre on 4 April 1941. His wife, Olga Böhm (née Lemberger) was deported to Theresienstadt in 1942 and murdered at the Auschwitz concentration camp in 1944. Their two children escaped to North America and Australia.
