= Juan Ramón Koenig =

Peruvian scientist

Juan Ramón Koenig (1623 Mechelen - 19 July 1709 Lima, Peru) was a Peruvian scientist.

== Biography ==
He was a priest and came to Peru in 1655 in the company of the viceroy, the Count of Alba de Aliste, who appointed him chaplain of the hospital of Espiritu Santo. Koenig taught various branches at the college of San Marcos, especially cosmography. By royal order he visited in 1672 the principal places of Peru to take observations of their latitude and longitude, for which purpose he had to construct for himself several mathematical instruments that were not to be obtained in Peru. In 1677 he was appointed successor of Francisco Lozano in the chair of mathematics and was also appointed royal cosmographer. In 1781 he engraved with his own hands a map of Peru on a silver plate, which was highly praised by the French geographer, Louis Feuillet. When the viceroy, the Duke of La Palata, resolved in 1682 to fortify the city of Lima, Koenig, together with Gen. Venegas Osorio, formed the plan for the fortifications and directed their execution.

== Works ==
Koenig wrote Problema de la duplicación del Cubo (Madrid, 1678), and from 1680 till 1708 published in Lima daily weather observations under the title of Conocimiento de los tiempos. During his last years he had accumulated much material for a geography of Peru, but, unfortunately, after his death a friend burned nearly all his papers to avoid making public his private matters, and thus the manuscript was lost.
