= Alfons König =

Alfon König
- Born: 29 December 1898; Munich, German Empire
- Died: 8 July 1944 (aged 45) near Bobruisk, Soviet Union
- Military career
- Allegiance: German Empire; Weimar Republic; Nazi Germany
- Branch: Army
- Rank: Oberst
- Conflicts: World War I World War II: Operation Bagration †
- Awards: Knight's Cross of the Iron Cross with Oak Leaves and Swords

Alfons König (29 December 1898 – 8 July 1944) was a German officer in the Wehrmacht of Nazi Germany during World War II and a recipient of the Knight's Cross of the Iron Cross with Oak Leaves and Swords. He was killed in action near Bobruisk on 8 July 1944 during the Soviet summer offensive, Operation Bagration.

== Awards ==
- Iron Cross (1939) 2nd Class (12 June 1940) & 1st Class (22 June 1940)
- Knight's Cross of the Iron Cross with Oak Leaves and Swords
  - Knight's Cross on 21 December 1940 as Oberleutnant and chief of the 6./Infanterie-Regiment 199 "List".
  - 194th Oak Leaves on 21 February 1943 as Hauptmann and commander of the III./Grenadier-Regiment 217
  - 70th Swords on 9 June 1944 as Oberstleutnant of the Reserves and commander of Grenadier-Regiment 199 "List"
