= Todd Koenig =

American football player (born 1985)

Profile
- Position: Safety

Personal information
- Born: November 27, 1985 (age 40); Nanty Glo, Pennsylvania
- Listed height: 6 ft 2 in (1.88 m)
- Listed weight: 214 lb (97 kg)

Career information
- High school: Ebensburg (PA) Bishop Carroll
- College: Ohio
- NFL draft: 2008: undrafted

Todd Koenig (born November 27, 1985) is an American former football safety. He was originally signed by the Browns as an undrafted free agent in 2008, but was cut from the roster on May 6. He played college football at Ohio.

== Early life ==
Koenig attended Bishop Carroll High School in Ebensburg, Pennsylvania and helped the Huskies to a state semifinal appearance in his senior year. He was a first-team Associated Press and Pennsylvania Football News all-state selection and was named Defensive Player of the Year by Johnstown's The Tribune-Democrat. Koenig was chosen as an all-star for both defensive back (first team) and running back (second team) by the Altoona Mirror, rushing for 1,722 yards and 26 touchdowns during his senior season. He finished his career with 2,385 yards, 35 touchdowns rushing, 14 catches for 338 yards, four touchdowns receiving, and 242 points (39 touchdowns, four two-point conversions) in addition to 154 tackles (83 solo) and three interceptions from his defensive spot.

HIGH SCHOOL: A first-team Associated Press and Pennsylvania Football News all-state selection as a specialist ... Named Defensive Player of the Year by the Johnstown Tribune-Democrat.... Chosen as an all-star for both defensive back (first team) and running back (second team) by the Altoona Mirror ... Helped the Huskies to the Pennsylvania state semifinals ... Rushed for 1,722 yards and 26 touchdowns during his senior season ... Recorded 83 tackles with an interception and four fumble recoveries ... Was also the team's kicker and punter ... Finished his career with 2,385 yards and 35 touchdowns rushing, 14 catches for 338 yards and four touchdowns and 242 points (39 touchdowns, four two-point conversions) ... Made 154 tackles (83 solo) from his defensive spot ... Added three career interceptions ... Held a 35.73 career punting average ... Two-time Pennsylvania Football News All-Academic Team.

== Collegiate career ==
2007: Played in all 12 games ... Recorded team-leading 96 tackles, 40 of them solo and 56 assisted...Had 4 tackles for loss and 0.5 sacks ... Also led the team in pass break-ups with 10 ... Recorded career highs in both assisted tackles with nine and total tackles with 11 (Sept. 29).

2006: Played in 11 games, starting all 11 ... Missed three games with a high-ankle sprain suffered against Kent State ... Came back to play in the MAC Championship Game ... Recorded 49 tackles, including 25 solo stops ... Ranked second for defensive backs with 4.5 tackles for loss ... Had 1.5 sacks and broke up three passes ... Had a career-best 1.5 tackles for loss against Bowling Green ... Was part of two sacks against Buffalo ... Had eight tackles in the win against Northern Illinois ... Registered eight tackles against Bowling Green ... Made a season-high nine stops against Western Michigan ... Tallied one tackle for loss against in the MAC title game.

2005: Played in all 11 games, starting nine ... Finished the season third on the team with 77 tackles and two interceptions ... Set a career-high in solo tackles with nine against Buffalo ... Led the team against Akron with eight stops ... Had another big game against Virginia Tech with a career-best 10 total tackles ... Intercepted a pass in the end zone against Pittsburgh, his first career interception.

2004: Took off redshirt five games into season when injuries at safety forced him to play in upset win at Kentucky ... Made his first career tackle against the Wildcats ... Also played against Marshall and Kent State.

Playing in all 12 games his senior season, Koenig set a career-high of 11 tackles in a game versus the Kent State Golden Flashes. As a junior, he recorded 49 tackles, including 25 solo stops and ranked second on the team for defensive backs with 4.5 tackles for loss. He also helped lead the Bobcats to a MAC East Division title, a MAC Championship Game appearance, and a 2007 GMAC Bowl appearance. Koenig left his mark on the Ohio program early, played in all 11 games of the 2005 season. During that season, he finished the third on the team with 77 tackles and two interceptions, while setting a season high in solo tackles with nine against Buffalo.
