= Per Brandt =

Swedish biathlete (born 1972)

Personal information
- Nationality: Swedish
- Born: 30 October 1972 (age 52); Vansbro, Sweden

Sport
- Sport: Biathlon

Per Brandt (born 30 October 1972) is a Swedish biathlete. He competed in the men's 20 km individual event at the 1994 Winter Olympics.
