= Hans Byberg =

Swedish bobsledder (born 1965)

Personal information
- Nationality: Swedish
- Born: 8 July 1965 (age 60) Karlskoga, Sweden

Sport
- Sport: Bobsleigh

Hans Byberg (born 8 July 1965) is a Swedish bobsledder. He competed in the two man and the four man events at the 1994 Winter Olympics.
