= Ove König =

Swedish speed skater (1950–2020)

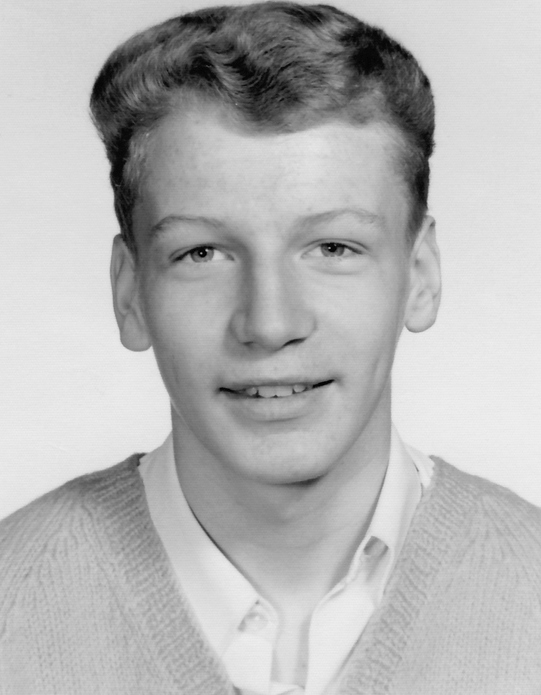

Personal information
- Full name: Nils Ove König
- Nationality: Swedish
- Born: 25 June 1950 Norrköping, Sweden
- Died: 23 July 2020 (aged 70) Alingsås, Sweden
- Relatives: Bo König (brother)

Sport
- Country: Sweden
- Sport: Speed skating
Medal record
Representing Sweden
World Sprint Championships
Silver medal – second place	1971 Inzell	Sprint

Nils Ove König (25 June 1950 – 23 July 2020) was a Swedish speed skater. He won a silver medal at the 1971 World Sprint Championships and finished seventh in the 500 m event at the 1972 Winter Olympics.
