= Inger Björkbom =

Swedish biathlete (born 1961)

Personal information
- Nationality: Swedish
- Born: 6 November 1961 (age 63)

Sport
- Sport: Biathlon

Inger Björkbom (born 6 November 1961) is a Swedish biathlete. She competed in three events at the 1992 Winter Olympics.
