= Christina Eklund =

Swedish biathlete (born 1970)

Personal information
- Nationality: Swedish
- Born: 19 January 1970 (age 56)

Sport
- Sport: Biathlon

Christina Eklund (born 19 January 1970) is a Swedish biathlete. She competed at the 1992 Winter Olympics and the 1994 Winter Olympics alongside her twin sister Catarina Eklund.
