= Leif Andersson (biathlete) =

Swedish biathlete (born 1961)

Personal information
- Born: 26 April 1961 (age 65) Finspång, Sweden

Sport

Leif Andersson (born 26 April 1961) is a Swedish former biathlete. At the 1992 Olympics in Albertville, Andersson won a bronze medal in the 4 x 7.5 km relay along with his teammates Mikael Löfgren, Tord Wiksten, and Ulf Johansson. His best individual Olympic placing was eighth, at the 1984 Olympics in Sarajevo.
