= Jonas Schön =

Swedish speed skater

Rolf Jonas Schön (born April 2, 1969 in Västerås) is a retired male ice speed skater from Sweden, who represented his native country in two consecutive Winter Olympics, starting in 1992 in Albertville, France. He mainly competed in the middle- and the long-distance events.
