= Magnus Westman =

Swedish ski jumper

Personal information
- Nationality: Swedish
- Born: 9 August 1966 (age 58); Örnsköldsvik, Sweden

Sport
- Sport: Ski jumping

Magnus Westman (born 9 August 1966) is a Swedish ski jumper. He competed at the 1992 Winter Olympics and the 1994 Winter Olympics. His daughter Frida competed in ski jumping at the 2022 Winter Olympics.
