= Fredrik Gustafsson (bobsleigh) =

Swedish bobsledder

Personal information
- Nationality: Swedish
- Born: 4 May 1964 (age 60); Örebro, Sweden

Sport
- Sport: Bobsleigh

Fredrik Gustafsson (born 4 May 1964) is a Swedish bobsledder. He competed in the two man and the four man events at the 1994 Winter Olympics.
