= Mikael Löfgren =

Swedish biathlete

Personal information
- Full name: Mikael Löfgren
- Born: 2 September 1969 (age 56) Torsby, Sweden
- Height: 1.83 m (6 ft 0 in)

Sport

Professional information
- Sport: Biathlon
- World Cup debut: 14 March 1987

Olympic Games
- Teams: 4 (1988, 1992, 1994, 1998)
- Medals: 2 (0 gold)

World Championships
- Teams: 7 (1989, 1990, 1991, 1993, 1995, 1996, 1997)
- Medals: 0

World Cup
- Seasons: 12 (1986/87–1997/98)
- Individual victories: 0
- Individual podiums: 5
- Overall titles: 1 (1992–93)
- Discipline titles: 1: 1 Individual (1992–93)
Medal record
Men's biathlon
Representing Sweden
Olympic Games
Bronze medal – third place	1992 Albertville	20 km individual
Bronze medal – third place	1992 Albertville	4 × 7.5 km relay

Mikael Löfgren (born 2 September 1969) is a former Swedish biathlete. He became the Junior World Champion in 1986, aged 17. At the 1992 Olympics in Albertville, France, he won two bronze medals, one in the 4 × 7.5 km relay and one in the 20 km individual. His teammates with the Swedish relay team were Ulf Johansson, Tord Wiksten, and Leif Andersson. The next season, he won the overall Biathlon World Cup.

Löfgren coached Norway's biathlon team from 2008 to 2012.

== Biathlon results ==
All results are sourced from the International Biathlon Union.

=== Olympic Games ===
2 medals (2 bronze)

Event	Individual	Sprint	Relay
(Canada) 1988 Calgary	51st	22nd	7th
(France) 1992 Albertville	Bronze	20th	Bronze
(Norway) 1994 Lillehammer	—	—	11th
(Japan) 1998 Nagano	20th	25th	10th

=== World Championships ===
Event	Individual	Sprint	Pursuit	Team	Relay
(Austria) 1989 Feistritz	16th	42nd	—N/a	5th	8th
(Soviet Union) 1990 Minsk	26th	39th	—N/a	8th	—
(Finland) 1991 Lahti	4th	39th	—N/a	8th	5th
(Bulgaria) 1993 Borovets	12th	14th	—N/a	7th	6th
(Italy) 1995 Antholz-Anterselva	38th	22nd	—N/a	9th	6th
(Germany) 1996 Ruhpolding	53rd	20th	—N/a	—	—
(Slovakia) 1997 Brezno-Osrblie	—	—	—	13th	11th

*During Olympic seasons competitions are only held for those events not included in the Olympic program.
**Pursuit was added as an event in 1997.
