= Ulf Johansson =

Swedish biathlete (born 1967)

Olympic medal record

Men's Biathlon
Bronze medal – third place	1992 Albertville	4 x 7.5 km relay

Ulf Johansson (born 26 May 1967) is a former Swedish biathlete. At the 1992 Olympics in Albertville, Johansson won a bronze medal in the 4 x 7.5 km relay with the Swedish team. His teammates were Mikael Löfgren, Tord Wiksten, and Leif Andersson.

== Biathlon results ==
All results are sourced from the International Biathlon Union.

=== Olympic Games ===
1 medal (1 bronze)

Event	Individual	Sprint	Relay
(France) 1992 Albertville	64th	14th	Bronze
(Norway) 1994 Lillehammer	42nd	20th	11th

=== World Championships ===
Event	Individual	Sprint	Team	Relay
(Austria) 1989 Feistritz	—	—	—	8th
(Soviet Union) 1990 Minsk	—	17th	8th	—
(Bulgaria) 1993 Borovets	77th	27th	—	6th
(Italy) 1995 Antholz-Anterselva	40th	77th	9th	6th

=== Individual victories ===
1 victories (1 In)

Season	Date	Location	Discipline	Level
1992–93; 1 victory (1 In)	21 January 1993	(Italy) Antholz-Anterselva	20 km individual	Biathlon World Cup

*Results are from UIPMB and IBU races which include the Biathlon World Cup, Biathlon World Championships and the Winter Olympic Games.
