= Cross-country skiing at the 1994 Winter Olympics – Women's 10 kilometre freestyle pursuit =

Women's 10 kilometre freestyle pursuit at the XVII Olympic Winter Games
- Venue: Birkebeineren Ski Stadium
- Dates: 17 February 1994
- Competitors: 55 from 17 nations
- Winning time: 27:30.1

Medalists
| 1st place, gold medalist(s) | | Lyubov Yegorova; Russia |
| 2nd place, silver medalist(s) | | Manuela Di Centa; Italy |
| 3rd place, bronze medalist(s) | | Stefania Belmondo; Italy |

The women's 10 kilometre freestyle pursuit cross-country skiing competition at the 1994 Winter Olympics in Lillehammer, Norway, was held on 17 February at Birkebeineren Ski Stadium in Lillehammer.

Each skier started based on the results from the 5 km classical event, skiing the entire 10 kilometre course after the first-to-finish principle. Lyubov Yegorova of Russia started first in the race with a gap of 20 seconds over Manuela Di Centa of Italy. Yegorova held on to her lead and defeated Di Centa by 7.8 seconds; her second consecutive olympic gold medal in the pursuit event.

== Background ==
At the previous Olympics, Lyubov Yegorova (then representing the Unified Team) won the gold medal. The silver medalist, Stefania Belmondo, qualified for the event. The bronze medalist, Yelena Välbe, qualified for the event but was not selected to compete in the 5km race. Yegorova and Välbe were tied for the overall lead in the World Cup standings prior to the Olympics. Belmondo was the 1993 world champion.

== Results ==
| Rank | Bib | Name | Country | Start | Time | Deficit |
|---|---|---|---|---|---|---|
| 1st place, gold medalist(s) | 1 | Lyubov Yegorova | Russia | 0:00 | 27:30.1 | – |
| 2nd place, silver medalist(s) | 2 | Manuela Di Centa | Italy | 0:20 | 27:38.4 | +8.3 |
| 3rd place, bronze medalist(s) | 13 | Stefania Belmondo | Italy | 0:56 | 28:13.1 | +43.0 |
| 4 | 6 | Larisa Lazutina | Russia | 0:36 | 28:28.6 | +58.5 |
| 5 | 11 | Nina Gavrilyuk | Russia | 0:53 | 28:28.9 | +58.8 |
| 6 | 8 | Kateřina Neumannová | Czech Republic | 0:41 | 28:41.8 | +1:11.7 |
| 7 | 7 | Trude Dybendahl | Norway | 0:40 | 28:42.2 | +1:12.1 |
| 8 | 4 | Anita Moen | Norway | 0:31 | 29:13.2 | +1:43.1 |
| 9 | 10 | Antonina Ordina | Sweden | 0:51 | 29:23.5 | +1:53.4 |
| 10 | 23 | Sophie Villeneuve | France | 1:23 | 29:28.8 | +1:58.7 |
| 11 | 20 | Sylvia Honegger | Switzerland | 1:13 | 29:30.9 | +2:00.8 |
| 12 | 12 | Elin Nilsen | Norway | 0:55 | 29:35.4 | +2:05.3 |
| 13 | 3 | Marja-Liisa Kirvesniemi | Finland | 0:28 | 29:49.6 | +2:19.5 |
| 14 | 15 | Małgorzata Ruchała | Poland | 0:59 | 29:49.7 | +2:19.6 |
| 15 | 9 | Pirkko Määttä | Finland | 0:43 | 29:53.1 | +2:23.0 |
| 16 | 26 | Fumiko Aoki | Japan | 1:33 | 30:00.4 | +2:30.3 |
| 17 | 32 | Alžbeta Havrančíková | Slovakia | 1:39 | 30:02.0 | +2:31.9 |
| 18 | 24 | Gabriella Paruzzi | Italy | 1:26 | 30:20.9 | +2:50.8 |
| 19 | 16 | Svetlana Nageykina | Russia | 1:00 | 30:23.7 | +2:53.6 |
| 20 | 29 | Iryna Taranenko | Ukraine | 1:38 | 30:38.2 | +3:08.1 |
| 21 | 14 | Marjut Rolig | Finland | 0:57 | 30:40.2 | +3:10.1 |
| 22 | 31 | Bernadeta Bocek | Poland | 1:39 | 30:50.2 | +3:20.1 |
| 23 | 37 | Barbara Mettler | Switzerland | 1:51 | 31:08.3 | +3:38.2 |
| 24 | 21 | Lubomíra Balážová | Slovakia | 1:15 | 31:20.1 | +3:50.0 |
| 25 | 35 | Anna-Lena Fritzon | Sweden | 1:44 | 31:29.5 | +3:59.4 |
| 26 | 22 | Piret Niglas | Estonia | 1:21 | 31:33.5 | +4:03.4 |
| 27 | 30 | Kristina Šmigun | Estonia | 1:38 | 31:51.4 | +4:21.3 |
| 28 | 38 | Dorota Kwaśny | Poland | 1:56 | 31:53.6 | +4:23.5 |
| 29 | 25 | Annika Evaldsson | Sweden | 1:27 | 32:03.4 | +4:33.3 |
| 30 | 51 | Isabelle Mancini | France | 2:23 | 32:12.8 | +4:42.7 |
| 31 | 28 | Nina Kemppel | United States | 1:36 | 32:13.8 | +4:43.7 |
| 32 | 40 | Leslie Thompson | United States | 2:00 | 32:22.6 | +4:52.5 |
| 33 | 43 | Iveta Zelingerová | Czech Republic | 2:07 | 32:32.2 | +5:02.1 |
| 34 | 19 | Bice Vanzetta | Italy | 1:13 | 32:35.1 | +5:05.0 |
| 35 | 48 | Tatiana Kutlíková | Slovakia | 2:19 | 32:45.0 | +5:14.9 |
| 36 | 50 | Sumiko Yokoyama | Japan | 2:22 | 32:48.0 | +5:17.9 |
| 37 | 17 | Anna Frithioff | Sweden | 1:05 | 32:50.1 | +5:20.0 |
| 38 | 33 | Yelena Antonova | Kazakhstan | 1:41 | 32:53.1 | +5:23.0 |
| 39 | 42 | Silke Schwager | Switzerland | 2:03 | 33:10.1 | +5:40.0 |
| 40 | 46 | Jaroslava Bukvajová | Slovakia | 2:18 | 33:20.3 | +5:50.2 |
| 41 | 54 | Élisabeth Tardy | France | 2:31 | 33:29.9 | +5:59.8 |
| 42 | 27 | Cristel Vahtra | Estonia | 1:34 | 33:32.3 | +6:02.2 |
| 43 | 57 | Irina Nikulchina | Bulgaria | 2:33 | 33:38.6 | +6:08.5 |
| 44 | 47 | Martina Vondrová | Czech Republic | 2:19 | 33:43.9 | +6:13.8 |
| 45 | 36 | Lyudmila Dideleva | Belarus | 1:49 | 33:47.9 | +6:17.8 |
| 46 | 39 | Silja Suija | Estonia | 1:59 | 33:55.3 | +6:25.2 |
| 47 | 41 | Carole Stanisière | France | 2:00 | 34:02.4 | +6:32.3 |
| 48 | 56 | Oksana Kotova | Kazakhstan | 2:32 | 34:03.6 | +6:33.5 |
| 49 | 44 | Yelena Piiraynen | Belarus | 2:17 | 34:06.4 | +6:36.3 |
| 50 | 53 | Ingrid Butts | United States | 2:25 | 34:31.6 | +7:01.5 |
| 51 | 60 | Jasmin Baumann | Switzerland | 2:52 | 35:01.2 | +7:31.1 |
| 52 | 55 | Jana Rázlová | Czech Republic | 2:31 | 35:38.8 | +8:08.7 |
| 53 | 49 | Yelena Chernetsova | Kazakhstan | 2:20 | 35:46.4 | +8:16.3 |
| DNF | 34 | Yelena Sinkevich | Belarus | 1:42 | Did not finish | |
| DNF | 59 | Kerrin Petty | United States | 2:44 | Did not finish | |
| DNS | 5 | Inger Helene Nybråten | Norway | 0:35 | Did not start | |
| DNS | 18 | Tuulikki Pyykkönen | Finland | 1:05 | Did not start | |
| DNS | 45 | Svetlana Kamotskaya | Belarus | 2:17 | Did not start | |
| DNS | 52 | Nataliya Shtaymets | Kazakhstan | 2:25 | Did not start | |
| DNS | 58 | Halina Nowak | Poland | 2:36 | Did not start | |
| DNS | 61 | Ineta Kravale | Latvia | 3:13 | Did not start | |
