= Brigitte Albrecht-Loretan =

Swiss cross-country skier

Personal information
- Nationality: Switzerland
- Born: October 6, 1970 (age 55) Lax, Switzerland

Sport
- Sport: Skiing
- Club: SC Obergoms

World Cup career
- Seasons: 11 – (1992–2002)
- Indiv. starts: 126
- Indiv. podiums: 0
- Team starts: 25
- Team podiums: 2
- Team wins: 1
- Overall titles: 0 – (12th in 1997)
- Discipline titles: 0
Medal record
Women's cross-country skiing
Representing Switzerland
Olympic Games
Bronze medal – third place	2002 Salt Lake City	4 × 5 km relay

Brigitte Albrecht-Loretan (née Albrecht; 6 October 1970) is a retired Swiss cross-country skier who competed from 1992 to 2002. She won a bronze medal in the 4 × 5 km relay at the 2002 Winter Olympics in Salt Lake City and had her best individual finish with a seventh place in the 30 km event at the 1998 Winter Olympics in Nagano.

Albrecht-Loretan's best finish at the FIS Nordic World Ski Championships was an 11th in the 15 km event in 1999. She also has twenty victories at various levels in her career from 1995 to 2002.

== Cross-country skiing results ==
All results are sourced from the International Ski Federation (FIS).

=== Olympic Games ===
- 1 medal – (1 bronze)

Year	Age	5 km	10 km	15 km	Pursuit	30 km	Sprint	4 × 5 km relay
1992	21	20	—N/a	—	37	17	—N/a	9
1994	23	—	—N/a	38	—	37	—N/a	5
1998	27	10	—N/a	—	10	7	—N/a	4
2002	31	—N/a	—	31	29	—	—	Bronze

=== World Championships ===
Year	Age	5 km	10 km	15 km	Pursuit	30 km	Sprint	4 × 5 km relay
1993	22	46	—N/a	25	36	25	—N/a	7
1995	24	46	—N/a	—	25	32	—N/a	7
1997	26	33	—N/a	14	14	26	—N/a	8
1999	28	21	—N/a	11	14	15	—N/a	5
2001	30	—N/a	—	—	41	CNX^{[a]}	—	—

a. ^{1} Cancelled due to extremely cold weather.

=== World Cup ===
==== Season standings ====
Season	Age				
Season	Age	Overall	Long Distance	Middle Distance	Sprint
1992	21	15	—N/a	—N/a	—N/a
1993	22	33	—N/a	—N/a	—N/a
1994	23	46	—N/a	—N/a	—N/a
1995	24	44	—N/a	—N/a	—N/a
1996	25	24	—N/a	—N/a	—N/a
1997	26	12	16	—N/a	12
1998	27	17	18	—N/a	15
1999	28	15	17	—N/a	15
2000	29	40	28	37	56
2001	30	50	—N/a	—N/a	57
2002	31	78	—N/a	—N/a	—

==== Team podiums ====
- 1 victory – (1 TS)
- 2 podiums – (2 TS)

No.	Season	Date	Location	Race	Level	Place	Teammate
1	1997–98	10 March 1998	Falun, Sweden	6 × 1.6 km Team Sprint F	World Cup	1st	Honegger
2	1998–99	8 March 1999	Vantaa, Finland	Team Sprint F	World Cup	3rd	Honegger
