= Cross-country skiing at the 1994 Winter Olympics – Women's 4 × 5 kilometre relay =

Women's 4 × 5 kilometre relay at the XVII Olympic Winter Games
- Pictogram for cross country
- Venue: Birkebeineren Ski Stadium
- Dates: 22 February 1994
- Competitors: 56 (14 teams) from 14 nations
- Winning time: 57:12.5

Medalists
1st place, gold medalist(s)		Yelena Välbe; Larisa Lazutina; Nina Gavrylyuk; Lyubov Yegorova	Russia
2nd place, silver medalist(s)		Trude Dybendahl; Inger Helene Nybråten; Elin Nilsen; Anita Moen	Norway
3rd place, bronze medalist(s)		Bice Vanzetta; Manuela Di Centa; Gabriella Paruzzi; Stefania Belmondo	Italy

The women's 4 × 5 km relay, a cross-country skiing event at the 1994 Winter Olympics, took place on 22 February at Birkebeineren Ski Stadium in Lillehammer, Norway. The race saw Russia beat Norway by 30.1 seconds, with Italy finishing third.

== Results ==
Rank	Bib	Country	Time	Deficit
1st place, gold medalist(s)	1	Russia; Yelena Välbe; Larisa Lazutina; Nina Gavrylyuk; Lyubov Yegorova	57:12.5	–
2nd place, silver medalist(s)	3	Norway; Trude Dybendahl; Inger Helene Nybråten; Elin Nilsen; Anita Moen	57:42.6	+30.1
3rd place, bronze medalist(s)	2	Italy; Bice Vanzetta; Manuela Di Centa; Gabriella Paruzzi; Stefania Belmondo	58:42.6	+1:30.1
4	4	Finland; Pirkko Määttä; Marja-Liisa Kirvesniemi; Merja Lahtinen; Marjut Rolig	59:15.9	+2:03.4
5	6	Switzerland; Sylvia Honegger; Silke Schwager; Barbara Mettler; Brigitte Albrecht	1:00:05.1	+2:52.6
6	5	Sweden; Anna Frithioff; Marie-Helene Östlund; Anna-Lena Fritzon; Antonina Ordina	1:00:05.8	+2:53.3
7	14	Slovakia; Lubomíra Balážová; Jaroslava Bukvajová; Tatiana Kutlíková; Alžbeta Havrančíková	1:01:00.2	+3:47.7
8	9	Poland; Mićhalina Maciuszek; Małgorzata Ruchała; Dorota Kwaśny; Bernadetta Bocek	1:01:13.2	+4:00.7
9	11	Czech Republic; Martina Vondrová; Iveta Zelingerová; Kateřina Neumannová; Lucie Chroustovská	1:02:02.1	+4:49.6
10	7	United States; Laura Wilson; Nina Kemppel; Laura McCabe; Leslie Thompson	1:02:28.4	+4:49.6
11	8	France; Carole Stanisière; Sylvie Giry-Rousset; Sophie Villeneuve; Elisabeth Tardy	1:02:28.6	+5:16.1
12	12	Estonia; Kristina Šmigun; Cristel Vahtra; Silja Suija; Piret Niglas	1:02:32.4	+5:19.9
13	10	Kazakhstan; Nataliya Shtaymets; Yelena Chernetsova; Oksana Kotova; Yelena Volodina	1:03:13.0	+6:00.5
14	13	Belarus; Yelena Piiraynen; Svetlana Kamotskaya; Lyudmila Dideleva; Yelena Sinkevich	1:04:25.18; 26:09.7; 28:17.7; 22:58.8; 25:02.9	+7:13.3
