= Mari Hietala =

Finnish cross-country skier

Personal information
- Nationality: Finland
- Born: 10 November 1969 (age 56) Muonio, Finland

Sport
- Sport: Skiing

World Cup career
- Seasons: 6 – (1990–1991, 1993–1996)
- Indiv. starts: 16
- Indiv. podiums: 0
- Team starts: 1
- Team podiums: 0
- Overall titles: 0 – (48th in 1993)
Medal record
Women's cross-country skiing
Representing Finland
Junior World Championships
Bronze medal – third place	1989 Vang	15 km freestyle

Mari Hietala (born 10 November 1969) is a Finnish cross-country skier. She competed in the women's 15 kilometre freestyle event at the 1994 Winter Olympics.

== Cross-country skiing results ==
All results are sourced from the International Ski Federation (FIS).

=== Olympic Games ===
Year	Age	5 km	15 km	Pursuit	30 km	4 × 5 km relay
1994	24	—	24	—	—	—

=== World Championships ===
Year	Age	5 km	15 km	Pursuit	30 km	4 × 5 km relay
1993	23	—	—	—	35	—

=== World Cup ===
==== Season standings ====
Season	Age	Overall
1990	20	NC
1991	21	NC
1993	23	48
1994	24	60
1995	25	76
1996	26	NC
