= Jasmin Baumann =

Swiss cross-country skier

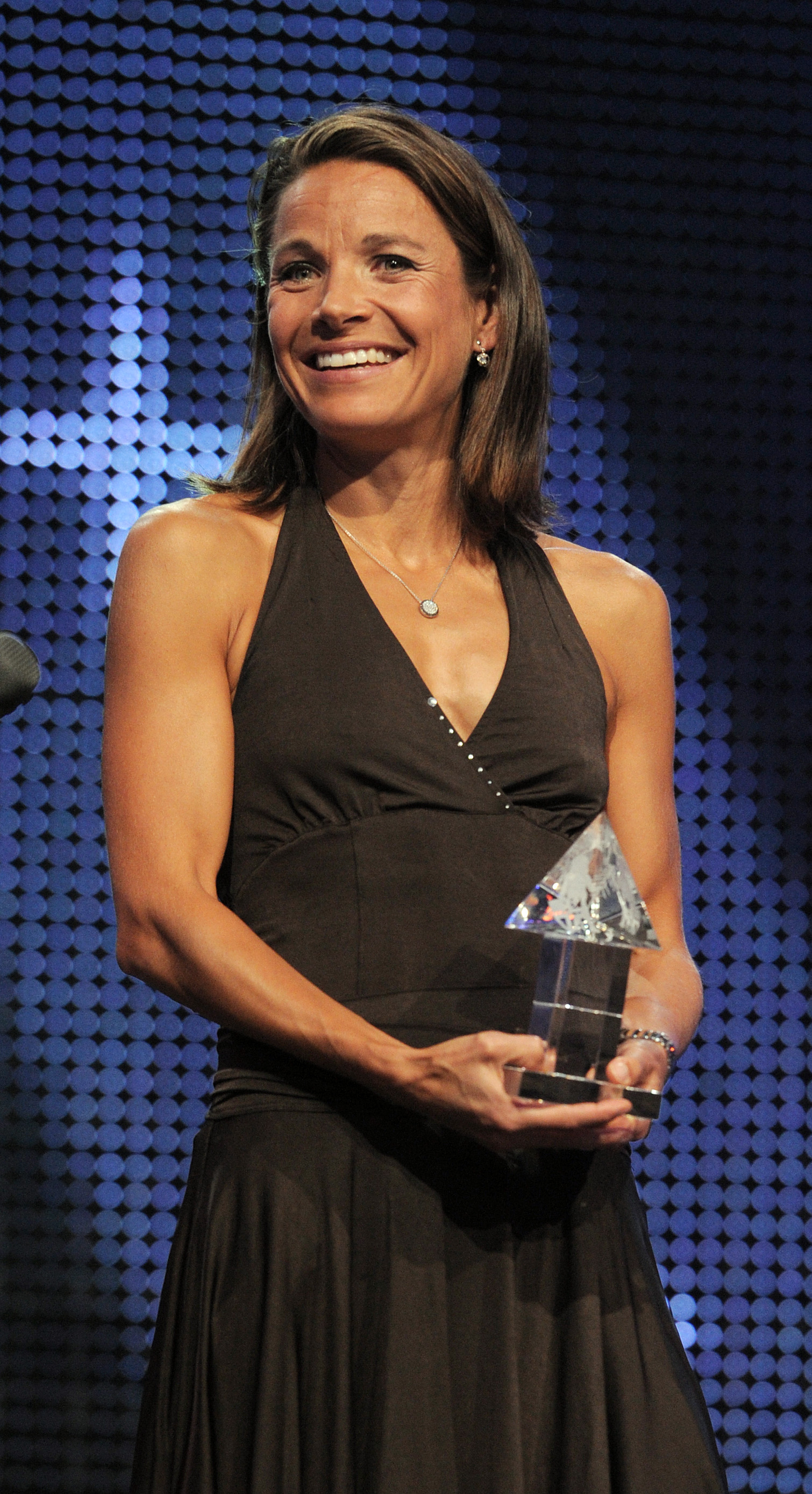

Personal information
- Nationality: Switzerland
- Born: 28 December 1973 (age 52) Davos, Switzerland

Sport
- Sport: Skiing
- Club: SC Davos

World Cup career
- Seasons: 5 – (1993–1996, 1998)
- Indiv. starts: 17
- Indiv. podiums: 0
- Team starts: 3
- Team podiums: 0
- Overall titles: 0 – (73rd in 1995)

Jasmin Nunige (née Baumann; born 28 December 1973) is a Swiss former cross-country skier. She competed in two events at the 1994 Winter Olympics.

== Cross-country skiing results ==
All results are sourced from the International Ski Federation (FIS).

=== Olympic Games ===
Year	Age	5 km	15 km	Pursuit	30 km	4 × 5 km relay
1994	20	60	—	51	—	—

=== World Championships ===
Year	Age	5 km	15 km	Pursuit	30 km	4 × 5 km relay
1995	21	65	—	DNS	39	—

=== World Cup ===
==== Season standings ====
Season	Age			
Season	Age	Overall	Long Distance	Sprint
1993	19	NC	—N/a	—N/a
1994	20	NC	—N/a	—N/a
1995	21	73	—N/a	—N/a
1996	22	NC	—N/a	—N/a
1998	24	NC	NC	—
