= Jana Rázlová =

Czech skier

Personal information
- Nationality: Czech Republic
- Born: 15 November 1974 (age 51) Liberec, Czechoslovakia

Sport
- Sport: Skiing

World Cup career
- Seasons: 3 – (1994–1996)
- Indiv. starts: 6
- Indiv. podiums: 0
- Team starts: 0
- Overall titles: 0
Medal record
Women's cross-country skiing
Representing Czech Republic
Junior World Championships
Gold medal – first place	1994 Breitenwang	4 × 5 km relay

Jana Rázlová (born 15 November 1974) is a Czech cross-country skier. She competed in three events at the 1994 Winter Olympics.

== Cross-country skiing results ==
All results are sourced from the International Ski Federation (FIS).

=== Olympic Games ===
Year	Age	5 km	15 km	Pursuit	30 km	4 × 5 km relay
1994	19	55	—	52	42	—

=== World Cup ===
==== Season standings ====
Season	Age	Overall
1994	19	NC
1995	20	NC
1996	21	NC
