= Annika Evaldsson =

Swedish cross-country skier

Personal information
- Full name: Annika Charlotta Evaldsson
- Nationality: Sweden
- Born: 14 May 1970 Åsarna, Sweden

Sport
- Sport: Skiing
- Club: Brunflo IF

World Cup career
- Seasons: 9 – (1992–2000)
- Indiv. starts: 58
- Indiv. podiums: 0
- Team starts: 15
- Team podiums: 0
- Overall titles: 0 – (29th in 1996)
- Discipline titles: 0
Medal record
Women's cross-country skiing
Representing Sweden
Junior World Championships
Silver medal – second place	1989 Vang	4 × 5 km relay

Annika Evaldsson (born 14 May 1970 in Åsarna, Sweden) is a Swedish cross-country skier who competed from 1992 to 2002. Her best World Cup finish was seventh in a sprint event in Sunne, Sweden on 11 March 1997.

At the 1994 Winter Olympics in Lillehammer, Evaldsson finished 25th in the 5 km and 29th in both the 5 km + 10 km combined pursuit and the 15 km events. Her best finish at the FIS Nordic World Ski Championships was 14th in the 5 km event at Trondheim in 1997.

During Swedish national championships she won the 5 km event in 1996 and 1997 and the sprint event in the year 2000. She was also part of Sollefteå SK's 3 × 5 kilometers relay-winning team in 1994 and 1995. In the year 2000, she won Tjejvasan.

== Cross-country skiing results ==
All results are sourced from the International Ski Federation (FIS).

=== Olympic Games ===
Year	Age	5 km	15 km	Pursuit	30 km	4 × 5 km relay
1994	23	25	29	29	—	—

=== World Championships ===
Year	Age	5 km	15 km	Pursuit	30 km	4 × 5 km relay
1995	24	39	—	DNS	—	—
1997	26	14	—	31	24	9
1999	28	49	46	DNF	—	—

=== World Cup ===
==== Season standings ====
Season	Age				
Season	Age	Overall	Long Distance	Middle Distance	Sprint
1992	21	NC	—N/a	—N/a	—N/a
1993	22	NC	—N/a	—N/a	—N/a
1994	23	48	—N/a	—N/a	—N/a
1995	24	47	—N/a	—N/a	—N/a
1996	25	29	—N/a	—N/a	—N/a
1997	26	34	NC	—N/a	29
1998	27	54	NC	—N/a	47
1999	28	66	48	—N/a	77
2000	29	64	—	NC	45
