= Lucie Chroustovská =

Czech cross-country skier

Personal information
- Nationality: Czech Republic
- Born: 13 January 1972 (age 54) Liberec, Czechoslovakia

Sport
- Sport: Skiing

World Cup career
- Seasons: 3 – (1993–1995)
- Indiv. starts: 15
- Indiv. podiums: 0
- Team starts: 1
- Team podiums: 0
- Overall titles: 0 – (68th in 1993)
Medal record
Women's cross-country skiing
Representing Czechoslovakia
Junior World Championships
Silver medal – second place	1992 Vuokatti	4 × 5 km relay

Lucie Chroustovská (born 13 January 1972) is a Czech cross-country skier. She competed in three events at the 1994 Winter Olympics. Chroustovská participated in the women's 15 kilometre freestyle, the 30 kilometre freestyle and the 4 x 5 kilometre relay. She finished 48th in the 15 km event, 39th in the 30 km event, and helped the Czech Republic to a 9th-place finish in the relay. She was the first woman to represent the Czech Republic at the Olympics.

== Cross-country skiing results ==
All results are sourced from the International Ski Federation (FIS).

=== Olympic Games ===
Year	Age	5 km	15 km	Pursuit	30 km	4 × 5 km relay
1994	22	—	48	—	39	9

=== World Championships ===
Year	Age	5 km	15 km	Pursuit	30 km	4 × 5 km relay
1993	21	—	32	—	48	—

=== World Cup ===
==== Season standings ====
Season	Age	Overall
1993	21	68
1994	22	NC
1995	23	NC
