= Sophie Villeneuve =

French cross-country skier

Personal information
- Nationality: France
- Born: November 6, 1969 (age 56) Mulhouse, France

Sport
- Sport: Skiing

World Cup career
- Seasons: 10 – (1990–1999)
- Indiv. starts: 94
- Indiv. podiums: 0
- Team starts: 18
- Team podiums: 1
- Team wins: 0
- Overall titles: 0 – (14th in 1998)
- Discipline titles: 0

Sophie Villeneuve (born 6 November 1969) is a French cross-country skier who competed from 1991 to 1999. Competing in three Winter Olympics, her best career finish was fifth in the 4 × 5 km relay at Albertville in 1992 while her best individual finish was ninth in the 15 km event at Lillehammer in 1994.

Villeneuve's best finish at the FIS Nordic World Ski Championships was ninth in the 15 km event at Trondheim in 1997. Her best World Cup finish was fourth in an individual sprint event in Italy in 1997.

Villeneuve's lone individual victory was in a 10 km Continental Cup event in Italy in 1992. She also competed in the women's cross-country mountain biking event at the 2000 Summer Olympics.

== Cross-country skiing results ==
All results are sourced from the International Ski Federation (FIS).

=== Olympic Games ===
Year	Age	5 km	15 km	Pursuit	30 km	4 × 5 km relay
1992	22	49	—	31	18	5
1994	24	23	9	10	—	11
1998	28	32	—	27	17	11

=== World Championships ===
Year	Age	5 km	10 km	15 km	Pursuit	30 km	4 × 5 km relay
1991	21	30	32	—	—N/a	18	9
1993	23	38	—N/a	—	20	22	9
1995	25	31	—N/a	—	18	16	9
1997	27	50	—N/a	9	20	35	7
1999	29	10	—N/a	19	10	21	9

=== World Cup ===
==== Season standings ====
Season	Age			
Season	Age	Overall	Long Distance	Sprint
1990	20	NC	—N/a	—N/a
1991	21	46	—N/a	—N/a
1992	22	NC	—N/a	—N/a
1993	23	29	—N/a	—N/a
1994	24	21	—N/a	—N/a
1995	25	36	—N/a	—N/a
1996	26	18	—N/a	—N/a
1997	27	15	18	14
1998	28	14	17	12
1999	29	18	23	22

==== Team podiums ====
- 1 podium – (1 TS)

No.	Season	Date	Location	Race	Level	Place	Teammate
1	1997–98	10 March 1998	Falun, Sweden	6 × 1.6 km Team Sprint F	World Cup	2nd	Laurent Philippot

== See also ==
- List of athletes who competed in both the Summer and Winter Olympic games
