= Cross-country skiing at the 1994 Winter Olympics – Women's 5 kilometre classical =

Cross-country skiing at the Olympics

Women's 5km at the XVII Olympic Winter Games
- Cross-country skiing
- Venue: Birkebeineren Ski Stadium
- Date: 15 February 1994
- Competitors: 62 from 19 nations
- Winning time: 14:08.8

Medalists
1st place, gold medalist(s)		Lyubov Yegorova	Russia
2nd place, silver medalist(s)		Manuela Di Centa	Italy
3rd place, bronze medalist(s)		Marja-Liisa Kirvesniemi	Finland

The Women's 5 kilometre cross-country skiing event was part of the cross-country skiing programme at the 1994 Winter Olympics, in Lillehammer, Norway. It was the ninth appearance of the event. The competition was held on 15 February 1994, at the Birkebeineren Ski Stadium.

== Results ==
Rank	Bib	Name	Country	Time	Deficit
1st place, gold medalist(s)	60	Lyubov Yegorova	Russia	14:08.8	–
2nd place, silver medalist(s)	43	Manuela Di Centa	Italy	14:28.3	+19.5
3rd place, bronze medalist(s)	47	Marja-Liisa Kirvesniemi	Finland	14:36.0	+27.2
4	45	Anita Moen	Norway	14:39.4	+30.6
5	61	Inger Helene Nybråten	Norway	14:43.6	+34.8
6	53	Larisa Lazutina	Russia	14:44.2	+35.4
7	51	Trude Dybendahl	Norway	14:48.1	+39.3
8	50	Kateřina Neumannová	Czech Republic	14:49.6	+40.8
9	49	Pirkko Määttä	Finland	14:51.5	+42.7
10	26	Antonina Ordina	Sweden	14:59.2	+50.4
11	52	Nina Gavrylyuk	Russia	15:01.6	+52.8
12	54	Elin Nilsen	Norway	15:03.1	+54.3
13	55	Stefania Belmondo	Italy	15:04.0	+55.2
14	46	Marjut Rolig	Finland	15:05.1	+56.3
15	24	Małgorzata Ruchała	Poland	15:07.5	+58.7
16	58	Svetlana Nageykina	Russia	15:08.5	+59.7
17	14	Anna Frithioff	Sweden	15:13.3	+1:04.5
18	48	Tuulikki Pyykkönen	Finland	15:13.6	+1:04.8
19	28	Bice Vanzetta	Italy	15:21.3	+1:12.5
20	57	Sylvia Honegger	Switzerland	15:21.7	+1:12.9
21	23	Ľubomíra Balážová	Slovakia	15:23.9	+1:15.1
22	38	Piret Niglas	Estonia	15:29.0	+1:20.2
23	33	Sophie Villeneuve	France	15:31.9	+1:23.1
24	44	Gabriella Paruzzi	Italy	15:34.7	+1:25.9
25	59	Annika Evaldsson	Sweden	15:35.7	+1:26.9
26	40	Fumiko Aoki	Japan	15:41.9	+1:33.1
27	16	Cristel Vahtra	Estonia	15:42.3	+1:33.5
28	34	Nina Kemppel	United States	15:44.8	+1:36.0
29	56	Iryna Taranenko-Terelia	Ukraine	15:46.0	+1:37.2
30	29	Kristina Šmigun	Estonia	15:46.1	+1:37.3
31	30	Bernadeta Bocek	Poland	15:47.1	+1:38.3
32	62	Alžbeta Havrančíková	Slovakia	15:47.2	+1:38.4
33	21	Elena Volodina	Kazakhstan	15:49.7	+1:40.9
34	20	Yelena Sinkevich	Belarus	15:50.2	+1:41.4
35	3	Anna-Lena Fritzon	Sweden	15:52.9	+1:44.1
36	10	Lyudmila Dideleva	Belarus	15:57.7	+1:48.9
37	32	Barbara Mettler	Switzerland	15:59.6	+1:50.8
38	12	Dorota Kwaśny	Poland	16:04.3	+1:55.5
39	11	Silja Suija	Estonia	16:07.8	+1:59.0
40	15	Leslie Thompson	United States	16:08.0	+1:59.2
41	27	Carole Stanisière	France	16:08.7	+1:59.9
42	13	Silke Schwager	Switzerland	16:11.2	+2:02.4
43	39	Iveta Zelingerová	Czech Republic	16:15.6	+2:06.8
44	25	Yelena Piraynen	Belarus	16:25.0	+2:16.2
45	37	Svetlana Kamotskaya	Belarus	16:25.8	+2:17.0
46	19	Jaroslava Bukvajová	Slovakia	16:26.6	+2:17.8
47	17	Martina Vondrová	Czech Republic	16:27.3	+2:18.5
48	4	Tatiana Kutlíková	Slovakia	16:27.7	+2:18.9
49	5	Yelena Chernetsova	Kazakhstan	16:28.8	+2:20.0
50	18	Sumiko Yokoyama	Japan	16:30.5	+2:21.7
51	22	Isabelle Mancini	France	16:31.4	+2:22.6
52	36	Nataliya Shtaymets	Kazakhstan	16:33.4	+2:24.6
53	7	Ingrid Butts	United States	16:33.6	+2:24.8
54	6	Élisabeth Tardy	France	16:39.3	+2:30.5
55	8	Jana Rázlová	Czech Republic	16:39.7	+2:30.9
56	41	Oksana Kotova	Kazakhstan	16:40.7	+2:31.9
57	35	Irina Nikulchina	Bulgaria	16:41.6	+2:32.8
58	9	Halina Nowak-Guńka	Poland	16:46.1	+2:37.3
59	31	Karen Petty	United States	16:52.5	+2:43.7
60	2	Jasmin Baumann	Switzerland	17:00.3	+2:51.5
61	1	Ineta Kravale	Latvia	17:21.5	+3:12.7
	42	Vida Vencienė	Lithuania	DNF	
