= Silke Schwager =

Swiss cross-country skier

Personal information
- Nationality: Switzerland
- Born: 8 April 1969 (age 57) Oberwiesenthal, East Germany

Sport
- Sport: Skiing
- Club: SC am Bachtel; SC Traktor Oberwiesenthal

World Cup career
- Seasons: 6 – (1987–1989, 1992–1994)
- Indiv. starts: 29
- Indiv. podiums: 0
- Team starts: 3
- Team podiums: 0
- Overall titles: 0 – (31st in 1988)
Medal record
Women's cross-country skiing
Representing East Germany
Junior World Championships
Silver medal – second place	1987 Asiago	3 × 5 km relay

Silke Schwager (née Braun, born 8 April 1969 in Oberwiesenthal, East Germany) is a Swiss cross-country skier who competed from 1987 to 1994. She competed for East Germany until 1990, and for Switzerland from 1992. Competing at the 1994 Winter Olympics in Lillehammer, she earned her best career finish of fifth in the 4 × 5 km relay and had her best individual finish of 33rd in the 30 km event.

Schwager finished 38th in the 15 km event at the 1993 FIS Nordic World Ski Championships in Falun. Her best World Cup finish was 25th in a 5 km event in Norway in 1993.

Schwager's best individual career finish was 13th in a 5 km FIS race in Norway in 1992.

== Cross-country skiing results ==
All results are sourced from the International Ski Federation (FIS).

=== Olympic Games ===
Year	Age	5 km	10 km	15 km	Pursuit	20 km	30 km	4 × 5 km relay
1988	18	25	—	—N/a	—N/a	—	—N/a	5
1992	22	—	—N/a	DNF	—	—N/a	—	—
1994	24	42	—N/a	—	39	—N/a	33	5

=== World Championships ===
Year	Age	5 km	10 km classical	10 km freestyle	15 km	Pursuit	30 km	4 × 5 km relay
1989	19	—N/a	24	24	—	—N/a	—	—
1993	23	—	—N/a	—N/a	38	—	—	7

=== World Cup ===
==== Season standings ====
Season	Age	Overall
1987	18	52
1988	19	31
1989	20	47
1992	23	NC
1993	24	NC
1994	25	NC
