= Élisabeth Tardy =

French cross-country skier (born 1972)

Personal information
- Nationality: France
- Born: 2 November 1972 (age 53) Saint-Étienne, France

Sport
- Sport: Skiing

World Cup career
- Seasons: 4 – (1993–1995, 1998)
- Indiv. starts: 9
- Indiv. podiums: 0
- Team starts: 1
- Team podiums: 0
- Overall titles: 0
- Discipline titles: 0

Élisabeth Tardy (born 2 November 1972) is a French cross-country skier. She competed in three events at the 1994 Winter Olympics.

== Cross-country skiing results ==
All results are sourced from the International Ski Federation (FIS).

=== Olympic Games ===
Year	Age	5 km	15 km	Pursuit	30 km	4 × 5 km relay
1994	21	54	—	41	—	11

=== World Cup ===
==== Season standings ====
Season	Age			
Season	Age	Overall	Long Distance	Sprint
1993	20	NC	—N/a	—N/a
1994	21	NC	—N/a	—N/a
1995	22	NC	—N/a	—N/a
1998	25	NC	NC	—
