= Finland at the 1994 Winter Olympics =

- IOC code: FIN
- NOC: Finnish Olympic Committee
- Website: sport.fi/olympiakomitea (in Finnish and Swedish)

in Lillehammer
- Competitors: 61 (47 men, 14 women) in 8 sports
- Flag bearer: Marja-Liisa Kirvesniemi
- Medals Ranked 16th: Gold 0 Silver 1 Bronze 5 Total 6

Winter Olympics appearances (overview)
- 1924; 1928; 1932; 1936; 1948; 1952; 1956; 1960; 1964; 1968; 1972; 1976; 1980; 1984; 1988; 1992; 1994; 1998; 2002; 2006; 2010; 2014; 2018; 2022; 2026

Finland competed at the 1994 Winter Olympics in Lillehammer, Norway.

== Medalists ==
Medal	Name	Sport	Event	Date
Silver	Mika Myllylä	Cross-country skiing	Men's 50 kilometre classical	27 February
Bronze	Mika Myllylä	Cross-country skiing	Men's 30 kilometre freestyle	14 February
Bronze	Marja-Liisa Kirvesniemi	Cross-country skiing	Women's 5 kilometre classical	15 February
Bronze	Jari Isometsä; Harri Kirvesniemi; Mika Myllylä; Jari Räsänen	Cross-country skiing	Men's 4 × 10 kilometre relay	22 February
Bronze	Marja-Liisa Kirvesniemi	Cross-country skiing	Women's 30 kilometre classical	24 February
Bronze	Finland men's national ice hockey team: Mika Alatalo; Raimo Helminen; Erik Hämäläinen; Timo Jutila; Sami Kapanen; Esa Keskinen; Marko Kiprusoff; Petri Varis; Saku Koivu; Pasi Kuivalainen; Janne Laukkanen; Tero Lehterä; Jere Lehtinen; Jarmo Myllys; Mika Nieminen; Hannu Virta; Mikko Mäkelä; Janne Ojanen; Marko Palo; Ville Peltonen; Pasi Sormunen; Mika Strömberg; Jukka Tammi	Ice hockey	Men's tournament	26 February

== Competitors ==
The following is the list of number of competitors in the Games.

Sport	Men	Women	Total
Alpine skiing	2	0	2
Biathlon	4	5	9
Cross-country skiing	7	6	13
Figure skating	1	2	3
Freestyle skiing	2	1	3
Ice hockey	22	–	22
Nordic combined	4	–	4
Ski jumping	5	–	5
Total	47	14	61

== Alpine skiing ==
Men

Athlete	Event	Final				
Athlete	Event	Run 1	Run 2	Run 3	Total	Rank
Janne Leskinen	Downhill				1:47.87	30
Janne Leskinen	Super-G				1:34.09	13
Janne Leskinen	Giant Slalom	1:34.65	DNS		DNF	
Janne Leskinen	Combined	1:38.88	54.47	52.18	3:25.53	22
Mika Marila	Super-G				1:38.14	40
Mika Marila	Giant Slalom	DNF			DNF	
Mika Marila	Slalom	1:02.54	1:02.45		2:04.99	12
Mika Marila	Combined	1:45.01	50.42	50.09	3:25.52	21

== Biathlon ==
Men

Athlete	Event	Final		
Athlete	Event	Time	Pen.	Rank
Harri Eloranta	10 km Sprint	30:02.1	4	15
Harri Eloranta	20 km Individual	1:01:40.9	6	30
Vesa Hietalahti	10 km Sprint	32:06.0	5	52
Vesa Hietalahti	20 km Individual	1:08:49.1	10	68
Erkki Latvala	10 km Sprint	32:08.4	3	54
Timo Seppälä	20 km Individual	1:02:07.0	3	41
Erkki Latvala; Harri Eloranta; Timo Seppälä; Vesa Hietalahti	4 × 7.5 km Relay	1:33:11.9	1	5

Women

Athlete	Event	Final		
Athlete	Event	Time	Pen.	Rank
Pirjo Aalto	7.5 km Sprint	29:59.2	3	61
Katja Holanti	15 km Individual	1:00:13.6	7	56
Mari Lampinen	7.5 km Sprint	27:14.5	2	16
Mari Lampinen	15 km Individual	59:16.9	6	48
Tuija Sikiö	7.5 km Sprint	27:39.1	0	24
Tuija Sikiö	15 km Individual	58:13.1	5	38
Tuija Vuoksiala	7.5 km Sprint	28:23.2	3	36
Tuija Vuoksiala	15 km Individual	1:00:09.3	6	55
Katja Holanti; Tuija Sikiö; Mari Lampinen; Tuija Vuoksiala	4 × 7.5 km Relay	1:58:55.7	4	10

== Cross-country skiing ==
Men

Athlete	Event	Final					
Athlete	Event	Start	Rank	Time	Rank	Total	Rank
Jukka Hartonen	30 km Free					1:16:18.7	13
Karri Hietamäki	50 km Classical					2:20:50.9	40
Jari Isometsä	10 km Classical					26:06.5	23
Jari Isometsä	15 km Free Pursuit					DNS	
Jari Isometsä	30 km Free					1:15:12.5	6
Harri Kirvesniemi	10 km Classical					25:13.2	9
Harri Kirvesniemi	15 km Free Pursuit					DNS	
Harri Kirvesniemi	50 km Classical					2:11:19.3	12
Mika Myllylä	10 km Classical					25:05.3	6
Mika Myllylä	15 km Free Pursuit	+0:45	6	36:50.9	7	+1:47.1	4
Mika Myllylä	30 km Free					1:14.14.5	3rd place, bronze medalist(s)
Mika Myllylä	50 km Classical					2:08:41.9	2nd place, silver medalist(s)
Jari Räsänen	10 km Classical					25:31.5	12
Jari Räsänen	15 km Free Pursuit	+01:11	12	36:32.7	3	+1:54.9	6
Jari Räsänen	30 km Free					1:16:10.7	11
Sami Repo	50 km Classical					2:20:32.8	37
Mika Myllylä; Harri Kirvesniemi; Jari Räsänen; Jari Isometsä	4 × 10 km relay					1:42:15.6	3rd place, bronze medalist(s)

Women

Athlete	Event	Final					
Athlete	Event	Start	Rank	Time	Rank	Total	Rank
Mari Hietala	15 km Free					44:56.8	24
Marja-Liisa Kirvesniemi	5 km Classical					14:30.6	3rd place, bronze medalist(s)
Marja-Liisa Kirvesniemi	10 km Free Pursuit	+00:28	3	29:21.6	21	+2:19.5	13
Marja-Liisa Kirvesniemi	30 km Classical					1:26:13.6	3rd place, bronze medalist(s)
Merja Lahtinen	15 km Free					43:50.7	16
Merja Lahtinen	30 km Classical					1:29:55.1	15
Pirkko Määttä	5 km Classical					14:51.5	9
Pirkko Määttä	10 km Free Pursuit	+00:43	9	29:10.1	18	+2:23.0	15
Pirkko Määttä	30 km Classical					1:29:27.0	14
Tuulikki Pyykkönen	5 km Classical					15:13.6	18
Tuulikki Pyykkönen	10 km Free Pursuit					DNS	
Marjut Rolig	5 km Classical					15:05.1	14
Marjut Rolig	10 km Free Pursuit	+00:57	14	29:43.2	23	+3:10.1	21
Marjut Rolig	30 km Classical					1:27:51.4	8
Pirkko Määttä; Marja-Liisa Kirvesniemi; Merja Lahtinen; Marjut Rolig	4 × 5 km relay					59:15.9	4

== Figure skating ==
Women

Athlete	Final				
Athlete	Short Program	Rank	Free Skating	Total	Rank
Mila Kajas	8.0	16	10.0	18.0	12

Ice Dancing

Athlete	Final								
Athlete	Compulsory Dance 1	Rank	Compulsory Dance 2	Rank	Original Dance	Rank	Free Dance	Total	Rank
Susanna Rahkamo; Petri Kokko	0.8	4	0.8	4	2.4	4	4.0	8.0	4

== Freestyle skiing ==
Men

Athlete	Event	Qualifying		Final	
Athlete	Event	Points	Rank	Points	Rank
Juha Holopainen	Moguls	23.39	20	did not advance	
Janne Lahtela	Moguls	24.60	12	24.78	9

Women

Athlete	Event	Qualifying		Final	
Athlete	Event	Points	Rank	Points	Rank
Minna Karhu	Moguls	23.08	11	23.00	13

== Ice hockey ==
=== Men's competition ===
Roster

- Head Coach: (Sweden) Curt Lindström

Pos.	No.	Name	1993-94 team
G	1	Pasi Kuivalainen	(Finland) KalPa
G	30	Jukka Tammi	(Finland) Tampereen Ilves
G	35	Jarmo Myllys	(Finland) Rauman Lukko
D	2	Marko Kiprusoff	(Finland) TPS
D	4	Erik Hämäläinen	(Finland) Jokerit
D	5	Timo Jutila	(Finland) Tampereen Tappara
D	6	Pasi Sormunen	(Finland) HIFK
D	12	Janne Laukkanen	(Finland) HPK
D	23	Hannu Virta	(Finland) TPS
D	26	Mika Strömberg	(Finland) Jokerit
F	8	Janne Ojanen	(Finland) Tampereen Tappara
F	9	Esa Keskinen	(Finland) TPS
F	11	Saku Koivu	(Finland) TPS
F	13	Marko Palo	(Finland) HPK
F	14	Raimo Helminen	(Sweden) Malmö IF
F	15	Mika Alatalo	(Finland) Rauman Lukko
F	16	Ville Peltonen	(Finland) HIFK
F	20	Jere Lehtinen	(Finland) TPS
F	24	Sami Kapanen	(Finland) KalPa
F	27	Tero Lehterä	(Finland) Kiekko-Espoo
F	28	Petri Varis	(Finland) Jokerit
F	40	Mika Nieminen	(Sweden) Luleå HF
F	42	Mikko Mäkelä	(Sweden) Malmö IF

Results

Pos	Team	Pld	W	D	L	GF	GA	GD	Pts	Qualification
1	Finland	5	5	0	0	25	4	+21	10	Quarterfinals
2	Germany	5	3	0	2	11	14	−3	6 (Note: Germany 2 points, +1 goal difference; Czech Republic 2 points, 0 goal difference; Russia 2 points, –1 goal difference.)	Quarterfinals
3	Czech Republic	5	3	0	2	16	11	+5	6	Quarterfinals
4	Russia	5	3	0	2	20	14	+6	6	Quarterfinals
5	Austria	5	1	0	4	13	28	−15	2	9–12th place semifinals
6	Norway (H)	5	0	0	5	5	19	−14	0	9–12th place semifinals

Source: Olympedia
(H) Hosts
Notes:

Stage	Opponent	Result	Points	Rank
Group Stage	Czech Republic	3-1		
Group Stage	Russia	5-0		
Group Stage	Norway	4-0		
Group Stage	Austria	6-2		
Group Stage	Germany	7-1		
Group Stage		25-4	10	1
Quarterfinal	United States	6-1		
Semifinal	Canada	3-5		
Bronze Medal Match	Russia	4-0		3rd place, bronze medalist(s)

== Nordic combined ==
Athlete	Event	First Round		Second Round			Cross-country				
Athlete	Event	Points	Rank	Points	Total	Rank	Start	Time	Rank	Total	Rank
Hannu Manninen	Individual event	95.5	32	101.5	197.0	23	+05:33	43:08.9	46	48:41.9	38
Jari Mantila	Individual event	104.5	13	109.0	213.5	10	+03:43	41:13.6	31	44:56.6	14
Tapio Nurmela	Individual event	95.5	32	91.5	187.0	34	+06:40	40:19.8	21	46:59.8	25
Topi Sarparanta	Individual event	95.0	35	97.0	192.0	28	+06:06	39:49.7	16	45:55.7	20
Jari Mantila; Tapio Nurmela; Topi Sarparanta	Team event	311.0	6	281.0	592.0	9	+11:47	1:24:32.4	7	1:36:19.4	8

== Ski jumping ==
Athlete	Event	First Round		Final		
Athlete	Event	Points	Rank	Points	Total	Rank
Janne Ahonen	Normal hill	112.5	24	73.5	186.0	37
Janne Ahonen	Large hill	90.3	23	73.1	163.4	25
Ari-Pekka Nikkola	Normal hill	116.0	19	115.0	231.0	16
Ari-Pekka Nikkola	Large hill	92.1	22	78.6	170.7	22
Jani Soininen	Normal hill	126.0	8	132.5	258.5	6
Jani Soininen	Large hill	109.6	11	121.5	231.1	5
Janne Väätäinen	Normal hill	113.0	23	93.0	206.0	30
Raimo Ylipulli	Large hill	103.3	14	79.3	182.6	18
Raimo Ylipulli; Janne Väätäinen; Janne Ahonen; Jani Soininen	Team	443.8	5	445.7	889.5	5
