= Piret Niglas =

Estonian cross-country skier (born 1968)

Personal information
- Nationality: Estonia
- Born: 5 April 1968 (age 58) Kohtla-Järve, then part of Estonian SSR, Soviet Union

Sport
- Sport: Skiing

World Cup career
- Seasons: 9 – (1991–1995, 1998–1999, 2001–2002)
- Indiv. starts: 27
- Indiv. podiums: 0
- Team starts: 3
- Team podiums: 0
- Overall titles: 0 – (40th in 1994)
- Discipline titles: 0

Piret Niglas (born 5 April 1968) is an Estonian cross-country skier. She competed at the 1992, 1994 and the 2002 Winter Olympics.

== Cross-country skiing results ==
All results are sourced from the International Ski Federation (FIS).

=== Olympic Games ===
Year	Age	5 km	10 km	15 km	Pursuit	30 km	Sprint	4 × 5 km relay
1992	23	38	—N/a	39	45	48	—N/a	—
1994	25	22	—N/a	23	26	29	—N/a	12
2002	33	—N/a	51	—	54	—	—	—

=== World Championships ===
Year	Age	5 km	10 km	15 km	Pursuit	30 km	Sprint	4 × 5 km relay
1995	26	—	—N/a	DNF	—	36	—N/a	11
2001	32	—N/a	47	53	44	CNX^{[a]}	—	—

a. ^{1} Cancelled due to extremely cold weather.

=== World Cup ===
==== Season standings ====
Season	Age			
Season	Age	Overall	Long Distance	Sprint
1991	22	NC	—N/a	—N/a
1992	23	NC	—N/a	—N/a
1993	24	NC	—N/a	—N/a
1994	25	40	—N/a	—N/a
1995	26	69	—N/a	—N/a
1998	29	NC	NC	—
1999	30	NC	NC	—
2001	32	NC	—N/a	—
2002	33	NC	—N/a	—
