= Jaroslava Bukvajová =

Slovak cross-country skier (born 1975)

Personal information
- Nationality: Slovakia
- Born: 17 November 1975 (age 50) Banská Bystrica, Czechoslovakia

Sport
- Sport: Skiing

World Cup career
- Seasons: 10 – (1994–2003)
- Indiv. starts: 82
- Indiv. podiums: 0
- Team starts: 9
- Team podiums: 0
- Overall titles: 0 – (28th in 1998)
- Discipline titles: 0
Medal record
Women's cross-country skiing
Representing Slovakia
Winter Universiade
Silver medal – second place	1999 Poprad-Tatry	5 km classical
Bronze medal – third place	1999 Poprad-Tatry	10 km freestyle

Jaroslava Bukvajová (born 17 November 1975 in Banská Bystrica) is a Slovak cross-country skier who competed from 1994 to 2004. Her best World Cup finish was ninth twice, both earned in Austria in 1998.

Bukvajová also competed in three Winter Olympics, earning her best finish of tenth in the 15 km event at Nagano in 1998. Her best finish at the FIS Nordic World Ski Championships was 17th on three occasions (5 km: 1995, 5 km + 10 km combined pursuit and 30 km: both 1999).

== Cross-country skiing results ==
All results are sourced from the International Ski Federation (FIS).

=== Olympic Games ===
Year	Age	5 km	10 km	15 km	Pursuit	30 km	Sprint	4 × 5 km relay
1994	18	46	—N/a	—	40	—	—N/a	7
1998	22	16	—N/a	10	18	15	—N/a	—
2002	26	—N/a	46	—	58	—	—	—

=== World Championships ===
Year	Age	5 km	10 km	15 km	Pursuit	30 km	Sprint	4 × 5 km relay
1995	19	17	—N/a	26	33	—	—N/a	—
1997	21	31	—N/a	—	40	34	—N/a	11
1999	23	31	—N/a	20	17	17	—N/a	—
2001	25	—N/a	39	46	45	CNX (Note: Cancelled due to extremely cold weather.)	—	—

=== World Cup ===
Season standings
Season	Age	Overall	Long Distance	Middle Distance	Sprint
1994	18	NC	—N/a	—N/a	—N/a
1995	19	49	—N/a	—N/a	—N/a
1996	20	40	—N/a	—N/a	—N/a
1997	21	NC	NC	—N/a	—
1998	22	28	27	—N/a	29
1999	23	31	29	—N/a	40
2000	24	79	48	NC	—
2001	25	115	—N/a	—N/a	NC
2002	26	88	—N/a	—N/a	—
2003	27	NC	—N/a	—N/a	—
