= Leslie Thompson (skier) =

American cross-country skier (born 1963)

Personal information
- Nationality: United States
- Born: September 9, 1963 (age 62) Burlington, Vermont, United States

Sport
- Sport: Skiing

World Cup career
- Seasons: 9 – (1985–1986, 1988–1990, 1992–1995)
- Indiv. starts: 39
- Indiv. podiums: 0
- Team starts: 6
- Team podiums: 0
- Overall titles: 0 – (39th in 1993)

Leslie Thompson (born 1963) is a former American cross-country skier who competed from 1985 to 1995. Competing in three Winter Olympics, she earned her best finish of eighth in the 4 × 5 km relay at Calgary in 1988 and her best individual finish of 32nd in the 5 km + 10 km combined pursuit at Lillehammer in 1994.

Thompson's best finish at the FIS Nordic World Ski Championships was 20th twice in the 30 km event (1993, 1995). Her best World cup finish was 17th in a 10 km event in Switzerland in 1993.

Thompson earned seven individual career victories in FIS races at distances between 5 km and 30 km from 1993 to 1995.

== Cross-country skiing results ==
All results are sourced from the International Ski Federation (FIS).

=== Olympic Games ===
Year	Age	5 km	10 km	15 km	Pursuit	20 km	30 km	4 × 5 km relay
1988	24	39	45	—N/a	—N/a	25	—N/a	8
1992	28	52	—N/a	—	41	—N/a	—	13
1994	30	40	—N/a	37	32	—N/a	—	10

=== World Championships ===
Year	Age	5 km	10 km classical	10 km freestyle	15 km	Pursuit	30 km	4 × 5 km relay
1989	25	—N/a	—	43	32	—N/a	36	11
1991	27	44	—N/a	25	—	—N/a	36	12
1993	29	34	—N/a	—N/a	—	25	20	8
1995	31	22	—N/a	—N/a	—	24	20	—

=== World Cup ===
==== Season standings ====
Season	Age	Overall
1985	21	NC
1986	22	NC
1988	24	NC
1989	25	NC
1990	26	NC
1992	28	NC
1993	29	39
1994	30	44
1995	31	46
