= Merja Kuusisto (cross-country skier) =

Finnish cross-country skier

Personal information
- Nationality: Finland
- Born: 30 June 1968 (age 58) Laihia, Finland

Sport
- Sport: Skiing

World Cup career
- Seasons: 9 – (1990–1998)
- Indiv. starts: 41
- Indiv. podiums: 0
- Team starts: 9
- Team podiums: 2
- Team wins: 0
- Overall titles: 0 – (23rd in 1995)

Merja Kuusisto (née Lahtinen; 30 June 1968) is a Finnish former cross-country skier who competed from 1992 to 1998. Competing at the 1994 Winter Olympics in Lillehammer, she had her best finish of fourth in the 4 × 5 km relay and her best individual finish of 15th in the 30 km event.

Kuusisto's best finish at the FIS Nordic World Ski Championships was tenth in the 15 km event at Thunder Bay, Ontario in 1995. Her best world Cup finish was 11th twice, both in Finland (1992, 1995).

Kuusisto's best individual career finish was second twice in 5 km FIS races in Finland (1994, 1997).

== Cross-country skiing results ==
All results are sourced from the International Ski Federation (FIS).

=== Olympic Games ===
Year	Age	5 km	15 km	Pursuit	30 km	4 × 5 km relay
1994	25	—	16	—	15	4

=== World Championships ===
Year	Age	5 km	15 km	Pursuit	30 km	4 × 5 km relay
1993	24	—	—	—	32	—
1995	26	29	10	DNF	—	6

=== World Cup ===
==== Season standings ====
Season	Age			
Season	Age	Overall	Long Distance	Sprint
1990	21	NC	—N/a	—N/a
1991	22	NC	—N/a	—N/a
1992	23	37	—N/a	—N/a
1993	24	51	—N/a	—N/a
1994	25	25	—N/a	—N/a
1995	26	23	—N/a	—N/a
1996	27	36	—N/a	—N/a
1997	28	NC	NC	—
1998	29	NC	NC	—

==== Team podiums ====
- 2 podiums

No.	Season	Date	Location	Race	Level	Place	Teammates
1	1990–91	10 March 1991	Falun, Sweden	4 × 5 km Relay C	World Cup	3rd	Lukkarinen / Savolainen / Kirvesniemi
2	1993–94	4 March 1994	Lahti, Finland	4 × 5 km Relay C	World Cup	3rd	Rolig / Pyykkönen / Kirvesniemi
