= Carole Stanisière =

French cross-country skier (born 1970)

Personal information
- Nationality: France
- Born: 3 June 1970 (age 56) Chamonix, France

Sport
- Sport: Skiing

World Cup career
- Seasons: 4 – (1992–1995)
- Indiv. starts: 22
- Indiv. podiums: 0
- Team starts: 3
- Team podiums: 0
- Overall titles: 0 – (56th in 1994)

Carole Stanisière (born 3 June 1970 in Chamonix, Haute-Savoie) is a French cross-country skier who competed from 1992 to 1998. Competing in two Winter Olympics, she had her best career finish of fifth in the 4 × 5 km relay at Albertville in 1992 and her best individual finish of 24th in the 30 km event at Lillehammer in 1994.

At the FIS Nordic World Ski Championships, Stasinière had her best finish of 29th in the 5 km event at Falun in 1993. Her best World Cup finish was 29th in a 10 km event in Switzerland in 1993.

Stanisière's best individual career finish was third twice in 5 km Continental Cup events in 1995.

== Cross-country skiing results ==
All results are sourced from the International Ski Federation (FIS).

=== Olympic Games ===
Year	Age	5 km	15 km	Pursuit	30 km	4 × 5 km relay
1992	21	—	32	—	—	5
1994	23	41	—	47	24	11

=== World Championships ===
Year	Age	5 km	15 km	Pursuit	30 km	4 × 5 km relay
1993	22	29	36	51	—	9
1995	24	59	42	DNS	—	9

=== World Cup ===
==== Season standings ====
Season	Age	Overall
1992	21	NC
1993	22	57
1994	23	56
1995	24	NC
