= Nina Kemppel =

American cross-country skier (born 1970)

Personal information
- Nationality: United States
- Born: October 14, 1970 (age 55) Boulder, Colorado, United States

Sport
- Sport: Skiing
- Club: APU Ski Team

World Cup career
- Seasons: 12 – (1990, 1992–2002)
- Indiv. starts: 111
- Indiv. podiums: 0
- Team starts: 8
- Team podiums: 0
- Overall titles: 0 – (34th in 1996)
- Discipline titles: 0

Nina Kemppel (born October 14, 1970) is an American cross-country skier who competed from 1992 to 2003. Her best World Cup finish was 14th twice, both earned in 2001.

Kemppel also competed in four Winter Olympics, earning her best finish of 13th in the 4 × 5 km relay at Salt Lake City in 2002. Her best finish at the FIS Nordic World Ski Championships was 22nd in the 5 km + 5 km combined pursuit at Lahti in 2001.

== Cross-country skiing results ==
All results are sourced from the International Ski Federation (FIS).

=== Olympic Games ===
Year	Age	5 km	10 km	15 km	Pursuit	30 km	Sprint	4 × 5 km relay
1992	21	56	—N/a	—	52	—	—N/a	—
1994	23	28	—N/a	42	31	27	—N/a	10
1998	27	67	—N/a	52	DNS	—	—N/a	—
2002	31	—N/a	38	29	30	15	—	13

=== World Championships ===
Year	Age	5 km	10 km	15 km	Pursuit	30 km	Sprint	4 × 5 km relay
1993	22	27	—N/a	55	30	34	—N/a	8
1995	24	32	—N/a	32	42	35	—N/a	10
1997	26	40	—N/a	34	33	27	—N/a	—
1999	28	40	—N/a	58	DNF	34	—N/a	14
2001	30	—N/a	23	35	22	CNX^{[a]}	39	—

a. ^{1} Cancelled due to extremely cold weather.

=== World Cup ===
==== Season standings ====
Season	Age				
Season	Age	Overall	Long Distance	Middle Distance	Sprint
1990	19	NC	—N/a	—N/a	—N/a
1992	21	NC	—N/a	—N/a	—N/a
1993	22	62	—N/a	—N/a	—N/a
1994	23	60	—N/a	—N/a	—N/a
1995	24	49	—N/a	—N/a	—N/a
1996	25	34	—N/a	—N/a	—N/a
1997	26	72	54	—N/a	NC
1998	27	NC	NC	—N/a	—
1999	28	64	44	—N/a	—
2000	29	57	36	NC	47
2001	30	48	—N/a	—N/a	54
2002	31	72	—N/a	—N/a	NC
