= Alžbeta Havrančíková =

Slovak cross-country skier (born 1963)

Personal information
- Nationality: Slovakia
- Born: 27 September 1963 (age 62) Šuňava, Czechoslovakia

Sport
- Sport: Skiing

World Cup career
- Seasons: 1984–2000
- Indiv. starts: 119
- Indiv. podiums: 3
- Indiv. wins: 2
- Team starts: 14
- Team podiums: 0
- Overall titles: 0 – (2nd in 1989)
- Discipline titles: 0

Alžbeta Havrančíková (born 27 September 1963) is a Czechoslovak and Slovak former cross-country skier who competed from 1984 to 2000. Competing in four Winter Olympics, she earned her best finish of sixth in the 4 × 5 km relay at Albertville in 1992 and her best individual finish of eighth in the 15 km event at Lillehammer in 1994.

Havrančíková's best finish at the FIS Nordic World Ski Championships was fourth twice at Lahti in 1989 (10 km, 30 km). She earned two individual World Cup victories (5 km: 1988, 30 km: 1989).

== Cross-country skiing results ==
All results are sourced from the International Ski Federation (FIS).

=== Olympic Games ===
Year	Age	5 km	10 km	15 km	Pursuit	20 km	30 km	4 × 5 km relay
1988	24	29	31	—N/a	—N/a	13	—N/a	7
1992	28	34	—N/a	—	17	—N/a	11	6
1994	30	32	—N/a	8	17	—N/a	32	7
1998	34	58	—N/a	—	40	—N/a	25	—

=== World Championships ===
Year	Age	5 km	10 km classical	10 km freestyle	15 km	Pursuit	20 km	30 km	4 × 5 km relay
1985	21	13	21	—N/a	—N/a	—N/a	16	—N/a	5
1987	23	20	—	—N/a	—N/a	—N/a	—	—N/a	9
1989	25	—N/a	—	4	26	—N/a	—N/a	4	5
1991	27	—	—N/a	17	—	—N/a	—N/a	12	8
1993	29	53	—N/a	—N/a	—	21	—N/a	5	5
1995	31	24	—N/a	—N/a	—	19	—N/a	11	—
1997	33	48	—N/a	—N/a	15	25	—N/a	—	11
1999	35	42	—N/a	—N/a	38	35	—N/a	28	—

=== World Cup ===
Season Standings
Season	Age	Overall	Long Distance	Middle Distance	Sprint
1984	20	32	—N/a	—N/a	—N/a
1985	21	22	—N/a	—N/a	—N/a
1986	22	12	—N/a	—N/a	—N/a
1987	23	34	—N/a	—N/a	—N/a
1988	24	21	—N/a	—N/a	—N/a
1989	25	2nd	—N/a	—N/a	—N/a
1990	26	24	—N/a	—N/a	—N/a
1991	27	21	—N/a	—N/a	—N/a
1992	28	14	—N/a	—N/a	—N/a
1993	29	19	—N/a	—N/a	—N/a
1994	30	22	—N/a	—N/a	—N/a
1995	31	28	—N/a	—N/a	—N/a
1996	32	31	—N/a	—N/a	—N/a
1997	33	36	32	—N/a	35
1998	34	NC	NC	—N/a	NC
1999	35	80	58	—N/a	NC
2000	36	NC	NC	NC	—

==== Individual podiums ====
- 2 victories
- 3 podiums

No.	Season	Date	Location	Race	Level	Place
1	1988–89	10 December 1988	La Féclaz, France	5 km Individual F	World Cup	1st
2	1988–89	14 December 1988	Campra, Switzerland	15 km Individual F	World Cup	2nd
3	1988–89	15 January 1989	Klingenthal, East Germany	30 km Individual F	World Cup	1st
