= Martina Vondrová =

Czech cross-country skier

Personal information
- Nationality: Czech Republic
- Born: 3 July 1972 (age 54) Jablonec nad Nisou, Czechoslovakia

Sport
- Sport: Skiing

World Cup career
- Seasons: 4 – (1993–1996)
- Indiv. starts: 19
- Indiv. podiums: 0
- Team starts: 1
- Team podiums: 0
- Overall titles: 0
Medal record
Women's cross-country skiing
Representing Czechoslovakia
Junior World Championships
Silver medal – second place	1992 Vuokatti	4 × 5 km relay

Martina Vondrová (born 3 July 1972) is a Czech cross-country skier. She competed in five events at the 1994 Winter Olympics.

== Cross-country skiing results ==
All results are sourced from the International Ski Federation (FIS).

=== Olympic Games ===
Year	Age	5 km	15 km	Pursuit	30 km	4 × 5 km relay
1994	21	47	31	44	36	9

=== World Championships ===
Year	Age	5 km	15 km	Pursuit	30 km	4 × 5 km relay
1993	20	—	42	—	44	—

=== World Cup ===
==== Season standings ====
Season	Age	Overall
1993	20	NC
1994	21	NC
1995	22	NC
1996	23	NC
