= Cristel Vahtra =

Estonian cross-country skier (born 1972)

Personal information
- Nationality: Estonia
- Born: 20 March 1972 (age 54) Jõgeva, Estonia

Sport
- Sport: Skiing

World Cup career
- Seasons: 7 – (1994–2000)
- Indiv. starts: 49
- Indiv. podiums: 0
- Team starts: 12
- Team podiums: 0
- Overall titles: 0 – (54th in 1994, 1995)
- Discipline titles: 0

Cristel Vahtra (born 20 March 1972) is an Estonian cross-country skier who competed from 1994 to 2001. Her best World Cup finish was 22nd in a 10 km event in Russia in 1996.

Vahtra also competed in two Winter Olympics, earning her best finish of 27th in the 5 km event at Lillehammer in 1994. Her best finish at the FIS Nordic World Ski Championships was 17th in the 5 km event at Thunder Bay in 1995.

== Cross-country skiing results ==
All results are sourced from the International Ski Federation (FIS).

=== Olympic Games ===
Year	Age	5 km	15 km	Pursuit	30 km	4 × 5 km relay
1994	21	27	45	42	35	12
1998	25	53	46	50	29	—

=== World Championships ===
Year	Age	5 km	15 km	Pursuit	30 km	4 × 5 km relay
1995	22	23	17	DNS	42	11
1997	24	43	—	51	45	—
1999	26	40	25	30	45	10

=== World Cup ===
==== Season standings ====
Season	Age				
Season	Age	Overall	Long Distance	Middle Distance	Sprint
1994	21	66	—N/a	—N/a	—N/a
1995	22	54	—N/a	—N/a	—N/a
1996	23	54	—N/a	—N/a	—N/a
1997	24	77	51	—N/a	—
1998	25	NC	NC	—N/a	—
1999	26	71	53	—N/a	—
2000	27	NC	NC	NC	—
