= 1994 Winter Olympics national flag bearers =

During the Parade of Nations section of the 1994 Winter Olympics opening ceremony, athletes from each country participating in the Olympic games paraded in the arena, preceded by name board bearers with a couple between them, and also the country flag. The flag was borne by a sportsperson from that country chosen either by the National Olympic Committee or by the athletes themselves to represent their country. The Parade of Nations was organized according to the Bokmål Norwegian alphabet. As usual, Greece leads the parade, followed by American Samoa. Due to logistical troubles, Mongolia did not march in the parade, but still competed in the Games. The announcers welcomed the country in their respective national language (Norwegian), English, and lastly French.

== List ==
Below is a list of parading countries and their announced flag bearer, in the same order as the parade. This is sortable by country name, flag bearer's name and flag bearer's sport. Names are given in the form officially designated by the IOC.

Order	Nation	Norsk/Bokmål	Flag bearer	Sport
1	Greece	Hellas	Thomai Lefousi	Alpine skiing
2	American Samoa	Amerikansk Samoa	Faauuga Muagututia	Bobsleigh
3	United States	Amerikas Forente Stater	Cammy Myler	Luge
4	Andorra	Andorra	Vicky Grau	Alpine skiing
5	Argentina	Argentina	María Giro	Biathlon
6	Armenia	Armenia	Arsen Harutyunyan	Alpine skiing
7	Australia	Australia	Kirstie Marshall	Freestyle skiing
8	Belarus	Belarus	Yevgeniy Redkin	Biathlon
9	Belgium	Belgia	Bea Pintens	Short track speed skating
10	Bermuda	Bermuda	John Hoskins	Chef de Mission
11	Bosnia and Herzegovina	Bosnia Hercegovina	Bekim Babić	Cross-country skiing
12	Brazil	Brasil	Lothar Christian Munder	Alpine skiing
13	Bulgaria	Bulgaria	Nadezhda Aleksieva	Biathlon
14	Canada	Canada	Kurt Browning	Figure skating
15	Chile	Chile	Alexis Racloz	Alpine skiing
16	Chinese Taipei	Chinese Taipei	Sun Kuang-Ming	Bobsleigh
17	Denmark	Danmark	Michael Tyllesen	Figure skating
18	Czech Republic	Den Tsjekkiske Republikk	Pavel Benc	Cross-country skiing
19	Estonia	Estland	Allar Levandi	Nordic combined
20	Fiji	Fiji	Rusiate Rogoyawa	Cross-country skiing
21	Finland	Finland	Marja-Liisa Kirvesniemi	Cross-country skiing
22	France	Frankrike	Anne Briand	Biathlon
23	Georgia	Georgia	Zurab Dzhidzhishvili	Alpine skiing
24	Iceland	Island	Ásta Halldórsdóttir	Alpine skiing
25	Israel	Israel	Michael Shmerkin	Figure skating
26	Italy	Italia	Deborah Compagnoni	Alpine skiing
27	Jamaica	Jamaica	Chris Stokes	Bobsleigh
28	Japan	Japan	Reiichi Mikata	Nordic combined
29	Virgin Islands	Jomfruøyene	Kyle Heikkila	Luge
30	Kazakhstan	Kasakhstan	Kayrat Biekenov	Ski jumping
31	China	Kina	Liu Yanfei	Speed skating
32	South Korea	Korea	Lee Joon-Ho	Short track speed skating
33	Croatia	Kroatia	Vedran Pavlek	Alpine skiing
34	Cyprus	Kypros	Karolina Fotiadou	Alpine skiing
35	Kyrgyzstan	Kyrgisistan	Torkel Engennes	Volunteer
36	Latvia	Latvia	Zintis Ekmanis	Bobsleigh
37	Liechtenstein	Liechtenstein	Markus Hasler	Cross-country skiing
38	Lithuania	Litauen	Povilas Vanagas	Figure skating
39	Luxembourg	Luxembourg	Georges Diderich	Chef de Mission
40	Mexico	Mexico	Hubertus von Hohenlohe	Alpine skiing
41	Moldova	Moldova	Vasily Gherghy	Biathlon
42	Monaco	Monaco	Albert II, Prince of Monaco	Bobsleigh
43	Netherlands	Nederland	Christine Aaftink	Speed skating
44	New Zealand	New Zealand	Tony Smith	Short track speed skating
45	Poland	Polen	Tomasz Sikora	Biathlon
46	Portugal	Portugal	João Duarte	Chef de Mission
47	Puerto Rico	Puerto Rico	Liston Bochette	Bobsleigh
48	Romania	Romania	Ioan Apostol	Luge
49	Russia	Russland	Sergei Tchepikov	Biathlon
50	San Marino	San Marino	Dino Crescentini	Bobsleigh
51	Senegal	Senegal	Lamine Guèye	Alpine skiing
52	Slovakia	Slovakia	Peter Šťastný	Ice Hockey
53	Slovenia	Slovenia	Jure Košir	Alpine skiing
54	Spain	Spania	Ainhoa Ibarra	Alpine skiing
55	Great Britain	Storbritannia	Michael Dixon	Biathlon
56	Switzerland	Sveits	Gustav Weder	Bobsleigh
57	Sweden	Sverige	Pernilla Wiberg	Alpine skiing
58	South Africa	Sør-Afrika	Dino Quattrocecere	Figure skating
59	Trinidad and Tobago	Trinidad og Tobago	Gregory Sun	Bobsleigh
60	Turkey	Tyrkia	Mithat Yıldırım	Cross-country skiing
61	Germany	Tyskland	Mark Kirchner	Biathlon
62	Ukraine	Ukraina	Viktor Petrenko	Figure skating
63	Hungary	Ungarn	Attila Bónis	Official
64	Uzbekistan	Usbekistan	Muslyum Settarov	Figure skating
65	Austria	Østerrike	Anita Wachter	Alpine skiing
66	Norway	Norge	Bjørn Dæhlie	Cross-country skiing
