= Ľubomíra Balážová =

Slovak cross-country skier (born 1968)

Personal information
- Nationality: Slovakia
- Born: 13 August 1968 (age 58) Štrba, Czechoslovakia

Sport
- Sport: Skiing

World Cup career
- Seasons: 8 – (1988–1989, 1992–1994, 1996–1998)
- Indiv. starts: 44
- Indiv. podiums: 0
- Team starts: 9
- Team podiums: 0
- Overall titles: 0 – (24th in 1992)
- Discipline titles: 0
Medal record
Women's cross-country skiing
Representing Slovakia
Winter Universiade
Gold medal – first place	1993 Zakopane	10 km classical
Gold medal – first place	1993 Zakopane	10 km freestyle
Gold medal – first place	1993 Zakopane	10 km combined

Ľubomíra Balážová (born 13 August 1968) is a Slovak cross-country skier who competed from 1988 to 1998. Competing in three Winter Olympics, she earned her best overall and individual finishes in Albertville in 1992 with a sixth in the 4 × 5 km relay and 11th in the 5 km event.

Balážová's best finish at the FIS Nordic World Ski Championships was 14th in the 15 km event at Falun in 1993. Her best World cup finish was tenth in a 5 km event in Sweden in 1992.

== Cross-country skiing results ==
All results are sourced from the International Ski Federation (FIS).

=== Olympic Games ===
Year	Age	5 km	10 km	15 km	Pursuit	20 km	30 km	4 × 5 km relay
1988	19	30	27	—N/a	—N/a	33	—N/a	7
1992	23	11	—N/a	13	26	—N/a	—	6
1994	25	21	—N/a	—	24	—N/a	18	7

=== World Championships ===
Year	Age	5 km	10 km classical	10 km freestyle	15 km	Pursuit	30 km	4 × 5 km relay
1989	20	—N/a	39	—	—	—N/a	—	5
1991	22	16	—N/a	—	19	—N/a	—	8
1993	24	32	—N/a	—N/a	14	37	—	5
1997	28	—	—N/a	—N/a	—	—	—	11

=== World Cup ===
Season standings
Season	Age	Overall	Long Distance	Sprint
1988	19	NC	—N/a	—N/a
1989	20	NC	—N/a	—N/a
1992	23	24	—N/a	—N/a
1993	24	35	—N/a	—N/a
1994	25	39	—N/a	—N/a
1996	27	NC	—N/a	—N/a
1997	28	NC	—	NC
1998	29	NC	NC	NC
