= Marjut Rolig =

Finnish cross-country skier

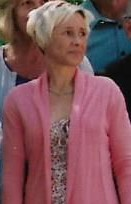
- Rolig in 2016

Personal information
- Full name: Anne Marjut Astrid Rolig
- Nationality: Finland
- Born: 4 February 1966 (age 60) Lohja, Finland

Sport
- Sport: Skiing
- Club: Lohjan Louhi

World Cup career
- Seasons: 6 – (1986–1987, 1990–1994)
- Indiv. starts: 41
- Indiv. podiums: 5
- Indiv. wins: 1
- Team starts: 10
- Team podiums: 3
- Team wins: 0
- Overall titles: 0 – (4th in 1992)
Medal record
Women's cross-country skiing
Representing Finland
Olympic Games
| Gold medal – first place | 1992 Albertville | 5 km classical |
| Silver medal – second place | 1992 Albertville | 15 km classical |
World Championships
| Bronze medal – third place | 1993 Falun | 15 km classical |

Marjut Rolig (née Lukkarinen; born 4 February 1966) is a Finnish former cross-country skier who competed during the early 1990s. She won two medals at the 1992 Winter Olympics in Albertville with a gold in the 5 km and a silver in the 15 km.

Rolig also won a bronze in the 15 km at the 1993 FIS Nordic World Ski Championships as well. She also won an FIS Race at 5 km in Finland in 1993.

== Cross-country skiing results ==
All results are sourced from the International Ski Federation (FIS).

=== Olympic Games ===
- 2 medals – (1 gold, 1 silver)

| Year | Age | 5 km | 15 km | Pursuit | 30 km | 4 × 5 km relay |
|---|---|---|---|---|---|---|
| 1992 | 26 | Gold | Silver | 4 | 10 | 4 |
| 1994 | 28 | 14 | — | 21 | 8 | 4 |

=== World Championships ===
- 1 medal – (1 bronze)

| Year | Age | 5 km | 10 km | 15 km | Pursuit | 30 km | 4 × 5 km relay |
|---|---|---|---|---|---|---|---|
| 1991 | 25 | 6 | 9 | 9 | —N/a | 17 | 4 |
| 1993 | 27 | 7 | —N/a | Bronze | 9 | — | 4 |

=== World Cup ===
==== Season standings ====
| Season | Age | Overall |
|---|---|---|
| 1986 | 20 | NC |
| 1987 | 21 | NC |
| 1990 | 24 | NC |
| 1991 | 25 | 11 |
| 1992 | 26 | 4 |
| 1993 | 27 | 9 |
| 1994 | 28 | 16 |

==== Individual podiums ====
- 1 victory
- 5 podiums

| No. | Season | Date | Location | Race | Level | Place |
|---|---|---|---|---|---|---|
| 1 | 1991–92 | 4 January 1992 | Kavgolovo, Russia | 15 km Individual C | World Cup | 2nd |
| 2 | 1991–92 | 9 February 1992 | Albertville, France | 15 km Individual C | Olympic Games^{[1]} | 2nd |
| 3 | 1991–92 | 13 February 1992 | Albertville, France | 5 km Individual C | Olympic Games^{[1]} | 1st |
| 4 | 1991–92 | 1 March 1992 | Lahti, Finland | 30 km Individual C | World Cup | 3rd |
| 5 | 1992–93 | 19 February 1993 | Falun, Sweden | 15 km Individual C | World Championships^{[1]} | 3rd |

==== Team podiums ====
- 3 podiums

| No. | Season | Date | Location | Race | Level | Place | Teammates |
|---|---|---|---|---|---|---|---|
| 1 | 1990–91 | 10 March 1991 | Falun, Sweden | 4 × 5 km Relay C | World Cup | 3rd | Lahtinen / Savolainen / Kirvesniemi |
| 2 | 1991–92 | 8 March 1992 | Funäsdalen, Sweden | 4 × 5 km Relay C | World Cup | 3rd | Riikola / Savolainen / Kirvesniemi |
| 3 | 1993–94 | 4 March 1994 | Lahti, Finland | 4 × 5 km Relay C | World Cup | 3rd | Pyykkönen / Lahtinen / Kirvesniemi |

Note: ^{1} Until the 1999 World Championships and the 1994 Olympics, World Championship and Olympic races were included in the World Cup scoring system.
