= Sylvia Honegger =

Swiss cross-country skier

Personal information
- Nationality: Switzerland
- Born: 25 April 1968 (age 58) Wald, Switzerland

Sport
- Sport: Skiing
- Club: Skiclub am Bachtel

World Cup career
- Seasons: 10 – (1989–1990, 1992–1999)
- Indiv. podiums: 0
- Team podiums: 2
- Team wins: 1
- Overall titles: 0 – (15th in 1995)
- Discipline titles: 0

Sylvia Honegger (born 25 April 1968) is a Swiss cross-country skier who “competed” from 1990 to 1999. Competing in three Winter Olympics, she had her best career finish of fourth in the 4 × 5 km relay at Nagano in 1998 and her best individual finish of 11th in the 5 km + 10 km combined pursuit event at Lillehammer in 1994.

Honegger's best finish at the FIS Nordic World Ski Championships was 11th in the 15 km event at Falun in 1993. Her best World Cup finish was fifth in a 5 km event in Sweden in 1994.

Honegger earned ten individual victories at lesser events at various distances up to 30 km from 1994 to 1999.

== Cross-country skiing results ==
All results are sourced from the International Ski Federation (FIS).

=== Olympic Games ===
Year	Age	5 km	15 km	Pursuit	30 km	4 × 5 km relay
1992	23	15	16	13	19	9
1994	25	20	21	11	19	5
1998	29	14	22	22	—	4

=== World Championships ===
Year	Age	5 km	10 km classical	10 km freestyle	15 km	Pursuit	30 km	4 × 5 km relay
1989	20	—N/a	46	32	—	—N/a	—	7
1991	22	38	—N/a	35	32	—N/a	—	10
1993	24	25	—N/a	—N/a	11	17	30	7
1995	26	DNF	—N/a	—N/a	21	—	19	7
1997	28	29	—N/a	—N/a	—	13	17	8
1999	30	30	—N/a	—N/a	—	23	DNF	5

=== World Cup ===
==== Season standings ====
Season	Age			
Season	Age	Overall	Long Distance	Sprint
1989	20	NC	—N/a	—N/a
1990	21	33	—N/a	—N/a
1992	23	32	—N/a	—N/a
1993	24	21	—N/a	—N/a
1994	25	23	—N/a	—N/a
1995	26	15	—N/a	—N/a
1996	27	19	—N/a	—N/a
1997	28	26	—	25
1998	29	31	—	22
1999	30	30	56	33

==== Team podiums ====
- 1 victory – (1 TS)
- 2 podiums – (2 TS)

No.	Season	Date	Location	Race	Level	Place	Teammate
1	1997–98	10 March 1998	Falun, Sweden	6 × 1.6 km Team Sprint F	World Cup	1st	Albrecht-Loretan
2	1998–99	8 March 1999	Vantaa, Finland	Team Sprint F	World Cup	3rd	Albrecht-Loretan
