= Iveta Fořtová =

Czech cross-country skier (born 1972)

Personal information
- Nationality: Czech Republic
- Born: Iveta Zelingerová; 21 June 1972 (age 54) Ústí nad Orlicí, Czechoslovakia

Sport
- Sport: Skiing

World Cup career
- Seasons: 7 – (1992–1998)
- Indiv. starts: 52
- Indiv. podiums: 0
- Team starts: 9
- Team podiums: 0
- Overall titles: 0 – (40th in 1992, 1993)
Medal record
Women's cross-country skiing
Representing Czechoslovakia
Junior World Championships
Silver medal – second place	1990 Les Saisies	5 km classical
Silver medal – second place	1992 Vuokatti	4 × 5 km relay
Bronze medal – third place	1989 Vang	4 × 5 km relay
Bronze medal – third place	1992 Vuokatti	15 km freestyle

Iveta Fořtová (née Zelingerová, also known as Fořtová-Zelingerová; born 21 June 1972) is a Czech cross-country skier who competed from 1992 to 1998. Competing in three Winter Olympics, she earned her best finishes at Albertville with sixth overall in the 4 × 5 km relay and 18th individually in the 5 km event.

Fořtová's best finish at the FIS Nordic World Ski Championships was 18th in the 15 km event at Thunder Bay, Canada, in 1995. Her best World Cup finish was 12th in a 30 km event in Italy in 1992.

Fořtová's lone career victory was in a 5 km FIS Race in the Czech Republic in 1997.

== Cross-country skiing results ==
All results are sourced from the International Ski Federation (FIS).

=== Olympic Games ===
Year	Age	5 km	15 km	Pursuit	30 km	4 × 5 km relay
1992	19	18	—	24	22	6
1994	21	43	41	33	DNF	9
1998	25	—	44	—	—	—

=== World Championships ===
Year	Age	5 km	15 km	Pursuit	30 km	4 × 5 km relay
1993	20	40	—	26	29	5
1995	22	40	18	23	30	8
1997	24	23	—	28	23	5

=== World Cup ===
==== Season standings ====
Season	Age	Discipline standings		
Season	Age	Overall	Long Distance	Sprint
1992	19	40	—N/a	—N/a
1993	20	40	—N/a	—N/a
1994	21	42	—N/a	—N/a
1995	22	52	—N/a	—N/a
1996	23	56	—N/a	—N/a
1997	24	58	58	—
1998	25	NC	NC	—
