= Ineta =

Female given name

- Gender: Female
- Name day: 3 June

Origin
- Region of origin: Latvia

Ineta is a Latvian feminine given name. The associated name day is June 3.

== Notable people named Ineta ==
- Ineta Kravale (born 1959), Latvian skier
- Ineta Mackevica (born 1992), Latvian squash player
- Ineta Radēviča (born 1981), Latvian athlete
- Ineta Ziemele (born 1970), Latvian jurist and judge at the Constitutional Court of Latvia

== In fiction ==
- Ineta Shirovs, EastEnders character
