= Tatiana Kutlíková =

Slovak skier (born 1972)

Personal information
- Nationality: Slovakia
- Born: September 27, 1972 (age 53) Ružomberok, Czechoslovakia (present day Slovakia)

Sport
- Sport: Skiing

World Cup career
- Seasons: 4 – (1994–1997)
- Indiv. starts: 28
- Indiv. podiums: 0
- Team starts: 3
- Team podiums: 0
- Overall titles: 0 – (49th in 1996)

Tatiana Kutlíková (born 27 September 1972) is a Slovak former cross-country skier and biathlete. She was born in Ružomberok in Czechoslovakia. She competed in cross-country skiing from 1994 to 1997. Competing at the 1994 Winter Olympics in Lillehammer, Kutlíková finished seventh in the 4 x 5 km relay and 35th in the 5 km + 10 km combined pursuit event, respectively overall and individually. She was the first woman to represent Slovakia at the Olympics.

Kutlíková's best finish at the FIS Nordic World Ski Championships was 23rd in the 30 km event at Thunder Bay, Ontario in 1995. Her best World Cup finish was 17th in a 30 km event in Slovakia in 1996.

Kutlíková's best career finish was ninth twice in an FIS race at the Czech Republic in the same weekend in 1997 (5 km, 10 km).

Ahead of the 1997–98 season, she switched to biathlon. She qualified for the Olympic team, and participated in Nagano as well as in Salt Lake City, after which she retired as an athlete.

== Cross-country skiing results ==
All results are sourced from the International Ski Federation (FIS).

=== Olympic Games ===
Year	Age	5 km	15 km	Pursuit	30 km	4 × 5 km relay
1994	21	48	46	35	43	7

=== World Championships ===
Year	Age	5 km	15 km	Pursuit	30 km	4 × 5 km relay
1995	22	29	36	32	23	—
1997	24	56	41	50	38	11

=== World Cup ===
==== Season standings ====
Season	Age			
Season	Age	Overall	Long Distance	Sprint
1994	21	NC	—N/a	—N/a
1995	22	57	—N/a	—N/a
1996	23	49	—N/a	—N/a
1997	24	NC	NC	—
