= Yelena Chernetsova =

Kazakhstani cross-country skier (born 1971)

Personal information
- Nationality: Kazakhstan
- Born: 21 January 1971 (age 55)

Sport
- Sport: Skiing

World Cup career
- Seasons: 1994, 1996
- Indiv. starts: 5
- Indiv. podiums: 0
- Team starts: 2
- Team podiums: 0
- Overall titles: 0

Yelena Chernetsova (Елена Григорьевна Чернецова, born 21 January 1971) is a Kazakhstani cross-country skier. She competed in five events at the 1994 Winter Olympics. She was the first woman to represent Kazakhstan at the Olympics.

== Cross-country skiing results ==
=== Olympic Games ===
| Year | Age | 5 km | 15 km | Pursuit | 30 km | 4 × 5 km relay |
|---|---|---|---|---|---|---|
| 1994 | 23 | 49 | 53 | 53 | 46 | 13 |

=== World Championships ===
| Year | Age | 5 km | 15 km | Pursuit | 30 km | 4 × 5 km relay |
|---|---|---|---|---|---|---|
| 1993 | 22 | — | — | — | — | 12 |

=== World Cup ===
==== Season standings ====
| Season | Age | Overall |
|---|---|---|
| 1994 | 23 | NC |
| 1996 | 25 | NC |
