= Elena Antonova (skier) =

Kazakhstani cross-country skier (born 1971)

Personal information
- Nationality: Kazakhstan
- Born: 22 April 1971 (age 55) Oral, Kazakh SSR, Soviet Union

Sport
- Sport: Skiing

World Cup career
- Seasons: 1994–1998, 2001–2003, 2005–2006, 2008–2010
- Indiv. starts: 62
- Indiv. podiums: 0
- Team starts: 14
- Team podiums: 0
- Overall titles: 0 – (55th in 1994)
- Discipline titles: 0

Elena Antonova (born 22 April 1971) is a Kazak cross-country skier who has competed since 1994. Competing in five Winter Olympics, she earned her best finish of 11th in the 4 × 5 km relay at Salt Lake City in 2002 while earning her best individual finish of 21st in the 30 km event at Lillehammer eight years earlier.

Antonova's best finish at the FIS Nordic World Ski Championships was fourth in the 4 × 5 km relay at Val di Fiemme in 2003 while her best individual finish was 26th in the individual sprint at Oberstdorf two years later.

Her best World Cup finish was fifth twice, both in the 4 × 5 km relay in 2001, while her best individual finish was 27th in a sprint event in Germany in 2005.

== Cross-country skiing results ==
All results are sourced from the International Ski Federation (FIS).

=== Olympic Games ===
| Year | Age | 5 km | 10 km | 15 km | Pursuit | 30 km | Sprint | 4 × 5 km relay | Team sprint |
|---|---|---|---|---|---|---|---|---|---|
| 1994 | 22 | 33 | —N/a | 47 | 38 | 21 | —N/a | 13 | —N/a |
| 1998 | 26 | — | —N/a | 57 | — | — | —N/a | — | —N/a |
| 2002 | 30 | —N/a | 29 | — | 47 | 32 | — | 11 | —N/a |
| 2006 | 34 | —N/a | 42 | —N/a | — | — | — | — | — |
| 2010 | 38 | —N/a | — | —N/a | — | — | 45 | — | — |

=== World Championships ===
| Year | Age | 5 km | 10 km | 15 km | Pursuit | 30 km | Sprint | 4 × 5 km relay | Team sprint |
|---|---|---|---|---|---|---|---|---|---|
| 1993 | 21 | — | —N/a | — | — | — | —N/a | 12 | —N/a |
| 1995 | 23 | 41 | —N/a | 45 | 53 | — | —N/a | — | —N/a |
| 2001 | 29 | —N/a | 27 | 42 | — | CNX^{[a]} | 46 | — | —N/a |
| 2003 | 31 | —N/a | 36 | 37 | — | — | 40 | 4 | —N/a |
| 2005 | 33 | —N/a | — | —N/a | 43 | — | 26 | 7 | — |
| 2007 | 35 | —N/a | — | —N/a | — | 29 | 42 | 11 | — |
| 2009 | 37 | —N/a | 39 | —N/a | — | — | — | — | — |

a. ^{1} Cancelled due to extremely cold weather.

=== World Cup ===
==== Season standings ====
| Season | Age | Discipline standings | | | | Ski Tour standings | |
| Season | Age | Overall | Distance | Long Distance | Sprint | Tour de Ski | World Cup Final |
|---|---|---|---|---|---|---|---|
| 1994 | 22 | 55 | —N/a | —N/a | —N/a | —N/a | —N/a |
| 1995 | 23 | NC | —N/a | —N/a | —N/a | —N/a | —N/a |
| 1996 | 24 | NC | —N/a | —N/a | —N/a | —N/a | —N/a |
| 1997 | 25 | NC | —N/a | NC | — | —N/a | —N/a |
| 1998 | 26 | NC | —N/a | NC | — | —N/a | —N/a |
| 2001 | 29 | NC | —N/a | —N/a | — | —N/a | —N/a |
| 2002 | 30 | NC | —N/a | —N/a | NC | —N/a | —N/a |
| 2003 | 31 | NC | —N/a | —N/a | — | —N/a | —N/a |
| 2005 | 33 | 94 | NC | —N/a | 68 | —N/a | —N/a |
| 2006 | 34 | NC | NC | —N/a | — | —N/a | —N/a |
| 2008 | 36 | 107 | 72 | —N/a | NC | 43 | — |
| 2009 | 37 | 105 | 78 | —N/a | NC | DNF | — |
| 2010 | 38 | NC | NC | —N/a | NC | — | — |
