= Kazakhstan at the 1994 Winter Olympics =

- IOC code: KAZ
- NOC: National Olympic Committee of the Republic of Kazakhstan
- Website: www.olympic.kz (in Kazakh, Russian, and English)

in Lillehammer
- Competitors: 29 in 8 sports
- Flag bearer: Kayrat Biekenov
- Medals Ranked 12th: Gold 1 Silver 2 Bronze 0 Total 3

Winter Olympics appearances (overview)
- 1994; 1998; 2002; 2006; 2010; 2014; 2018; 2022; 2026

Other related appearances
- Soviet Union (1956–1988); Unified Team (1992)

Kazakhstan competed in the Winter Olympic Games as an independent nation for the first time at the 1994 Winter Olympics in Lillehammer, Norway. Previously, Kazakhstani athletes competed for the Unified Team at the 1992 Winter Olympics.

== Medalists ==
Medal	Name	Sport	Event	Date
Gold	Vladimir Smirnov	Cross-country skiing	Men's 50 kilometre classical	27 February
Silver	Vladimir Smirnov	Cross-country skiing	Men's 10 kilometre classical	17 February
Silver	Vladimir Smirnov	Cross-country skiing	Men's 15 kilometre freestyle pursuit	19 February

== Competitors ==
The following is the list of number of competitors in the Games.

Sport	Men	Women	Total
Alpine skiing	1	1	2
Biathlon	1	1	2
Cross-country skiing	6	4	10
Figure skating	1	1	2
Freestyle skiing	1	0	1
Short track speed skating	0	1	1
Ski jumping	3	–	3
Speed skating	6	2	8
Total	19	10	29

== Alpine skiing ==
Men

Athlete	Event	Final				
Athlete	Event	Run 1	Run 2	Run 3	Total	Rank
Andrey Kolotvin	Super-G				1:50.39	43
Andrey Kolotvin	Combined	1:41.14	58.54	54.91	3:34.59	29

Women

Athlete	Event	Final				
Athlete	Event	Run 1	Run 2	Run 3	Total	Rank
Olga Vedyacheva	Super-G				1:26.66	37
Olga Vedyacheva	Downhill				1:38.58	24
Olga Vedyacheva	Combined	1:29.74	56.89	54.24	3:20.87	19

== Biathlon ==
Men

Athlete	Event	Final		
Athlete	Event	Time	Pen.	Rank
Dmitry Pantov	10 km sprint	31:54.2	5	48
Dmitry Pantov	20 km individual	1:03:29.8	6	51

Women

Athlete	Event	Final		
Athlete	Event	Time	Pen.	Rank
Inna Sheshkil	7.5 km sprint	26:13.9	2	4
Inna Sheshkil	15 km individual	56:16.5	5	29

== Cross-country skiing ==
Men

Athlete	Event	Final					
Athlete	Event	Start	Rank	Time	Rank	Total	Rank
Nikolay Ivanov	10 km classical					25:48.3	16
Nikolay Ivanov	15 km free pursuit	+01:28	16	38:22.5	25	+4:01.7	19
Nikolay Ivanov	30 km free					1:20:53.9	40
Nikolay Ivanov	50 km classical					2:22:59.1	50
Pavel Korolyov	30 km free					1:23:25.3	53
Sergey Margatsky	50 km classical					2:21:57.9	45
Andrey Nevzorov	10 km classical					26:45.9	37
Andrey Nevzorov	15 km free pursuit	+02:25	37	38:47.9	37	+5:24.1	31
Andrey Nevzorov	30 km free					1:21:14.5	42
Pavel Ryabinin	10 km classical					26:41.7	34
Pavel Ryabinin	15 km free pursuit	+2:21	34	38:24.6	27	+4:56.8	26
Pavel Ryabinin	50 km classical					2:18:08.1	29
Vladimir Smirnov	Men's 10 kilometre classical					24:38.3	Silver
Vladimir Smirnov	Men's 15 kilometre freestyle pursuit	+00:18	2	36:00.0	2	+29.2	Silver
Vladimir Smirnov	30 km free					1:16:01.8	10
Vladimir Smirnov	Men's 50 kilometre classical					2:07:20.3	Gold
Nikolay Ivanov; Pavel Korolyov; Andrey Nevzorov; Pavel Ryabinin	4 × 10 km relay					1:47:41.3	9

Women

Athlete	Event	Final					
Athlete	Event	Start	Rank	Time	Rank	Total	Rank
Yelena Chernetsova	5 km classical					16:28.8	49
Yelena Chernetsova	10 km free pursuit	+02:20	49	33:26.4	53	+8:16.3	53
Yelena Chernetsova	15 km free					49:56.7	53
Yelena Chernetsova	30 km classical					1:38:17.0	46
Oksana Kotova	5 km classical					16:40.7	56
Oksana Kotova	10 km free pursuit	+02:32	56	31:31.6	43	+6:33.5	48
Oksana Kotova	15 km free					47:02.1	43
Oksana Kotova	30 km classical					1:38:34.1	47
Nataliya Shtaymets	5 km classical					16:33.4	52
Nataliya Shtaymets	10 km free pursuit						DNF
Yelena Volodina	5 km classical					15:49.7	33
Yelena Volodina	10 km free pursuit	+01:41	33	31:12.1	40	+5:23.0	38
Yelena Volodina	15 km free					47:35.6	47
Yelena Volodina	30 km classical					1:31:43.1	21
Nataliya Shtaymets; Yelena Chernetsova; Oksana Kotova; Yelena Volodina	4 × 5 km relay					1:03:13.0	13

== Figure skating ==
Ice dancing

Athlete	Final								
Athlete	Compulsory dance 1	Rank	Compulsory dance 2	Rank	Original dance	Rank	Free dance	Total	Rank
Elizaveta Stekolnikova; Dmitry Kazarlyga	3.4	17	3.4	17	10.2	17	18.0	35.0	18

== Freestyle skiing ==
Men

Athlete	Event	Qualifying		Final	
Athlete	Event	Points	Rank	Points	Rank
Aleksey Bannikov	Moguls	22.98	21	Did Not Advance	

== Short track speed skating ==
Women

Athlete	Event	Heats		Quarterfinals		Semifinals		Final	
Athlete	Event	Time	Rank	Time	Rank	Time	Rank	Time	Rank
Yelena Sinitsina	500 metres	50.36	3rd	Ranking round					21st
Yelena Sinitsina	1000 metres	-	DQ	Ranking round					DQ

== Ski jumping ==
Athlete	Event	First round		Final		
Athlete	Event	Points	Rank	Points	Total	Rank
Andrey Verveykin	Large hill	72.0	32	62.1	134.1	37
Andrey Verveykin	Normal hill	102.0	37	119.5	221.5	24
Aleksandr Kolmakov	Large hill	52.6	45	44.3	96.9	48
Aleksandr Kolmakov	Normal hill	89.5	48	76.0	165.5	46
Kayrat Biekenov	Large hill	91.0	47	66.5	157.5	49
Kayrat Biekenov	Normal hill	7.3	58	27.9	35.2	58

== Speed skating ==
Men

Athlete	Event	Final	
Athlete	Event	Time	Rank
Radik Bikchentayev	1500 metres	1:56.73	29
Radik Bikchentayev	5000 metres	6:58.17	16
Vladimir Klepenin	500 metres	38.09	33
Vladimir Klepenin	1000 metres	1:15.99	34
Yevgeny Sanarov	5000 metres	6:59.02	19
Yevgeny Sanarov	10000 metres	14:21.12	14
Vadim Sayutin	1500 metres	1:57.03	30
Vadim Sayutin	5000 metres	7:01.93	27
Vadim Shakshakbayev	500 metres	37.07	12
Vadim Shakshakbayev	1000 metres	1:15.06	20
Sergey Tsybenko	1500 metres	1:57.43	33

Women

Athlete	Event	Final	
Athlete	Event	Time	Rank
Lyudmila Prokasheva	3000 metres	4:19.33	4
Lyudmila Prokasheva	5000 metres	7:28.58	6
Kenzhesh Sarsekenova	3000 metres	4:45.56	24
