= Cross-country skiing at the 1994 Winter Olympics – Women's 30 kilometre classical =

Women's 30 kilometre classical at the XVII Olympic Winter Games
- Venue: Birkebeineren Ski Stadium
- Dates: 24 February 1994
- Competitors: 53 from 19 nations
- Winning time: 1:25:41.6

Medalists
1st place, gold medalist(s)		Manuela Di Centa; Italy
2nd place, silver medalist(s)		Marit Wold; Norway
3rd place, bronze medalist(s)		Marja-Liisa Kirvesniemi; Finland

The women's 30 kilometre classical cross-country skiing competition at the 1994 Winter Olympics in Lillehammer, Norway, was held on 24 February at Birkebeineren Ski Stadium.

== Results ==
The results:

Rank	Bib	Name	Country	Time	Deficit
1st place, gold medalist(s)	45	Manuela Di Centa	Italy	1:25:41.6	–
2nd place, silver medalist(s)	47	Marit Wold	Norway	1:25:57.8	+16.2
3rd place, bronze medalist(s)	42	Marja-Liisa Kirvesniemi	Finland	1:26:13.6	+32.0
4	55	Trude Dybendahl	Norway	1:26:52.6	+1:11.0
5	51	Lyubov Yegorova	Russia	1:26:54.8	+1:13.2
6	41	Yelena Välbe	Russia	1:26:57.4	+1:15.8
7	39	Inger Helene Nybråten	Norway	1:27:11.2	+1:29.6
8	43	Marjut Rolig	Finland	1:27:51.4	+2:09.8
9	49	Svetlana Nageykina	Russia	1:27:57.2	+2:15.6
10	54	Anita Moen	Norway	1:28:18.1	+2:36.5
11	31	Antonina Ordina	Sweden	1:28:39.2	+2:57.6
12	40	Marie-Helene Östlund	Sweden	1:28:46.2	+3:04.6
13	6	Anna Frithioff	Sweden	1:29:07.2	+3:25.6
14	46	Pirkko Määttä	Finland	1:29:27.0	+3:45.4
15	25	Merja Kuusisto	Finland	1:29:55.1	+4:13.5
16	38	Małgorzata Ruchała	Poland	1:30:45.8	+5:04.2
17	21	Guidina Dal Sasso	Italy	1:30:47.5	+5:05.9
18	32	Lubomíra Balážová	Slovakia	1:30:58.7	+5:17.1
19	53	Sylvia Honegger	Switzerland	1:31:11.6	+5:30.0
20	50	Iryna Taranenko	Ukraine	1:31:26.5	+5:44.9
21	30	Yelena Volodina	Kazakhstan	1:31:43.1	+6:01.5
22	24	Yelena Sinkevich	Belarus	1:31:47.8	+6:06.2
23	52	Natalya Martynova	Russia	1:31:59.4	+6:17.8
24	33	Carole Stanisière	France	1:32:17.6	+6:36.0
25	22	Vida Vencienė	Lithuania	1:32:18.9	+6:37.3
26	37	Fumiko Aoki	Japan	1:32:22.3	+6:40.7
27	36	Nina Kemppel	United States	1:32:55.3	+7:13.7
28	9	Lis Frost	Sweden	1:33:04.1	+7:22.5
29	29	Piret Niglas	Estonia	1:33:09.3	+7:27.7
30	44	Gabriella Paruzzi	Italy	1:33:28.9	+7:47.3
31	10	Mićhalina Maciuszek	Poland	1:33:34.2	+7:52.6
32	48	Alžbeta Havrančíková	Slovakia	1:33:41.5	+7:59.9
33	2	Silke Schwager	Switzerland	1:34:07.4	+8:25.8
34	27	Bernadeta Bocek	Poland	1:34:28.6	+8:47.0
35	19	Cristel Vahtra	Estonia	1:34:48.6	+9:07.0
36	34	Martina Vondrová	Czech Republic	1:34:50.1	+9:08.5
37	15	Brigitte Albrecht	Switzerland	1:34:55.3	+9:13.7
38	13	Irina Nikulchina	Bulgaria	1:36:06.3	+10:24.7
39	12	Lucie Chroustovská	Czech Republic	1:36:07.8	+10:26.2
40	8	Dorcas Wonsavage	United States	1:36:34.1	+10:52.5
41	28	Barbara Mettler	Switzerland	1:36:40.8	+10:59.2
42	4	Jana Rázlová	Czech Republic	1:36:40.9	+10:59.3
43	16	Tatiana Kutlíková	Slovakia	1:36:41.4	+10:59.8
44	26	Svetlana Kamotskaya	Belarus	1:36:51.0	+11:09.4
46	11	Sumiko Yokoyama	Japan	1:37:14.7	+11:33.1
47	18	Yelena Chernetsova	Kazakhstan	1:38:17.0	+12:35.4
47	7	Oksana Kotova	Kazakhstan	1:38:34.1	+12:52.5
48	14	Ineta Kravale	Latvia	1:38:41.8	+13:00.2
49	35	Laura Wilson	United States	1:38:52.6	+13:11.0
50	17	Sylvie Giry-Rousset	France	1:39:26.3	+13:44.7
51	1	Suzanne King	United States	1:45:27.9	+19:46.3
	3	Dorota Kwaśny	Poland	DNF	
	23	Iveta Zelingerová	Czech Republic	DNF	
	5	Lyudmila Dideleva	Belarus	DNS	
	20	Yelena Piiraynen	Belarus	DNS	
