= Pasi Kuivalainen =

Finnish ice hockey player (born 1972)

Pasi Kuivalainen (born July 15, 1972 in Kuopio, Finland) is a retired professional ice hockey player who played in the SM-liiga. He played for KalPa, Porin Ässät, Ilves, Pelicans and Tappara.

== See also ==
- Ice hockey in Finland
