= Marja-Liisa Kirvesniemi =

Finnish cross-country skier (born 1955)

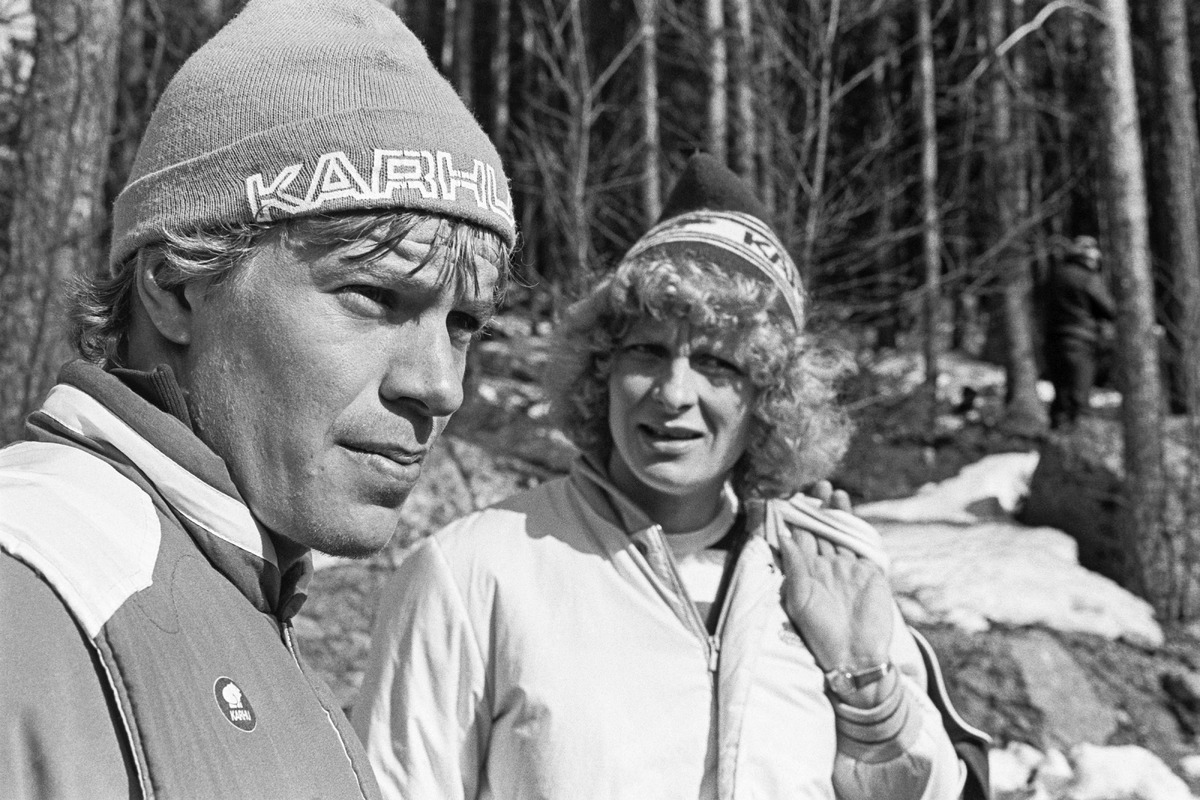

Personal information
- Nationality: Finland
- Born: Marja-Liisa Hämäläinen; 10 September 1955 (age 71) Simpele, South Karelia, Finland
- Spouse: Harri Kirvesniemi (m. 1984; div. 2011)

Sport
- Sport: Skiing
- Club: Simpeleen Urheilijat

World Cup career
- Seasons: 10 – (1982–1985, 1988–1989, 1991–1994)
- Indiv. starts: 64
- Indiv. podiums: 27
- Indiv. wins: 11
- Team starts: 15
- Team podiums: 8
- Team wins: 1
- Overall titles: 2 – (1983, 1984)
Medal record
Women's cross-country skiing
Representing Finland
Olympic Games
Gold medal – first place	1984 Sarajevo	5 km
Gold medal – first place	1984 Sarajevo	10 km
Gold medal – first place	1984 Sarajevo	20 km
Bronze medal – third place	1984 Sarajevo	4 × 5 km relay
Bronze medal – third place	1988 Calgary	4 × 5 km relay
Bronze medal – third place	1994 Lillehammer	5 km classical
Bronze medal – third place	1994 Lillehammer	30 km classical
World Championships
Gold medal – first place	1978 Lahti	4 × 5 km relay
Gold medal – first place	1989 Lahti	10 km classical
Gold medal – first place	1989 Lahti	4 × 5 km relay
Silver medal – second place	1985 Seefeld	5 km
Silver medal – second place	1985 Seefeld	10 km
Silver medal – second place	1989 Lahti	15 km classical
Silver medal – second place	1991 Val di Fiemme	5 km classical
Silver medal – second place	1993 Falun	15 km classical

Marja-Liisa Kirvesniemi (née Hämäläinen; born 10 September 1955) is a Finnish former cross-country skier.

== Career ==
She was the big figure at the 1984 Olympics in Sarajevo, winning all three individual cross-country skiing events (5, 10 and 20 km), and a bronze medal for Finland in the relay. In the process, she became the most successful athlete at the 1984 Winter Olympics. At the 1988 Winter Olympics in Calgary, she won another relay bronze medal, and at the 1994 Winter Olympics in Lillehammer, she won two more bronze medals in the 5 and 30 km.

At the FIS Nordic World Ski Championships, Kirvesniemi won three golds in the 10 km (1989) and 4 × 5 km relay (1978, 1989), and five silvers in the 5 km (1985, 1991), 10 km (1985) and 15 km (1989, 1993). She also won the 20 km double pursuit at the 1989 Holmenkollen ski festival.

Kirvesniemi won the Holmenkollen medal in 1989. Her husband, Harri, would be awarded the Holmenkollen medal in 1998. They were the third husband-and-wife pair that won this prestigious honor. They are the only married couple to have both competed at six Olympics, and are among the only eight Finns to have done so - the others being Janne Ahonen (ski jumping), Raimo Helminen (ice hockey), Teemu Selänne (ice hockey), Kyra Kyrklund (dressage), Juha Hirvi (shooting), and Hannu Manninen (Nordic combined).

== Cross-country skiing results ==
All results are sourced from the International Ski Federation (FIS).

=== Olympic Games ===
- 7 medals – (3 gold, 4 bronze)

Year	Age	5 km	10 km	15 km	Pursuit	20 km	30 km	4 × 5 km relay
1976	20	—	22	—N/a	—N/a	—N/a	—N/a	—
1980	24	19	18	—N/a	—N/a	—N/a	—N/a	5
1984	28	Gold	Gold	—N/a	—N/a	Gold	—N/a	Bronze
1988	32	5	9	—N/a	—N/a	11	—N/a	Bronze
1992	36	31	—N/a	6	DNS	—N/a	—	4
1994	38	Bronze	—N/a	—	13	—N/a	Bronze	4

=== World Championships ===
- 8 medals – (3 gold, 5 silver)

Year	Age	5 km	10 km classical	10 km freestyle	15 km	Pursuit	20 km	30 km	4 × 5 km relay
1978	22	—	23	—N/a	—N/a	—N/a	16	—N/a	Gold
1982	26	17	11	—N/a	—N/a	—N/a	17	—N/a	4
1985	29	Silver	Silver	—N/a	—N/a	—N/a	12	—N/a	4
1989	33	—N/a	Gold	—	Silver	—N/a	—N/a	8	Gold
1991	35	Silver	—N/a	—	12	—N/a	—N/a	—	4
1993	37	14	—N/a	—N/a	Silver	DNS	—N/a	—	4

=== World Cup ===
==== Season titles ====
- 2 titles – (2 overall)

Season
Season	Discipline
1983	Overall
1984	Overall

==== Season standings ====
Season	Age	Overall
1982	26	18
1983	27	1st place, gold medalist(s)
1984	28	1st place, gold medalist(s)
1985	29	10
1988	32	3rd place, bronze medalist(s)
1989	33	6
1991	35	17
1992	36	10
1993	37	8
1994	38	10

==== Individual podiums ====
- 11 victories
- 27 podiums

No.	Season	Date	Location	Race	Level	Place
1	1982–83	12 December 1982	Val di Sole, Italy	5 km Individual	World Cup	2nd
2	1982–83	25 February 1983	Falun, Sweden	10 km Individual	World Cup	2nd
3	1982–83	5 March 1983	Lahti, Finland	5 km Individual	World Cup	1st
4	1982–83	12 March 1983	Oslo, Norway	20 km Individual	World Cup	2nd
5	1982–83	20 March 1983	Anchorage, United States	10 km Individual	World Cup	1st
6	1982–83	27 March 1983	Labrador City, Canada	10 km Individual	World Cup	1st
7	1983–84	17 December 1983	Autrans, France	10 km Individual	World Cup	1st
8	1983–84	9 February 1984	(Socialist Federal Republic of Yugoslavia) Sarajevo, Yugoslavia	10 km Individual	Olympic Games^{[1]}	1st
9	1983–84	12 February 1984	(Socialist Federal Republic of Yugoslavia) Sarajevo, Yugoslavia	5 km Individual	Olympic Games^{[1]}	1st
10	1983–84	18 February 1984	(Socialist Federal Republic of Yugoslavia) Sarajevo, Yugoslavia	20 km Individual	Olympic Games^{[1]}	1st
11	1983–84	25 February 1984	Falun, Sweden	10 km Individual	World Cup	3rd
12	1983–84	8 March 1984	Oslo, Norway	20 km Individual	World Cup	2nd
13	1984–85	19 February 1985	Seefeld, Austria	10 km Individual	World Championships^{[1]}	2nd
14	1984–85	21 February 1985	Seefeld, Austria	5 km Individual	World Championships^{[1]}	2nd
15	1987–88	19 December 1987	Reit im Winkl, West Germany	5 km Individual F	World Cup	1st
16	1987–88	17 March 1988	Oslo, Norway	30 km Individual C	World Cup	2nd
17	1988–89	17 February 1989	Lahti, Finland	10 km Individual C	World Championships^{[1]}	1st
18	1988–89	21 February 1989	Lahti, Finland	15 km Individual C	World Championships^{[1]}	2nd
19	1988–89	4 March 1989	Oslo, Norway	20 km Individual C	World Cup	1st
20	1990–91	12 February 1991	Val di Fiemme, Italy	5 km Individual C	World Championships^{[1]}	2nd
21	1991–92	4 January 1992	Kavgolovo, Russia	15 km Individual C	World Cup	3rd
22	1991–92	7 March 1992	Funäsdalen, Sweden	5 km Individual C	World Cup	1st
23	1992–93	9 January 1993	Ulrichen, Switzerland	10 km Individual C	World Cup	2nd
24	1992–93	19 February 1993	Falun, Sweden	15 km Individual C	World Championships^{[1]}	2nd
25	1993–94	8 January 1994	Kavgolovo, Russia	10 km Individual C	World Cup	2nd
26	1993–94	15 February 1994	Lillehammer, Norway	5 km Individual C	Olympic Games^{[1]}	3rd
27	1993–94	24 February 1994	Lillehammer, Norway	30 km Individual C	Olympic Games^{[1]}	3rd

==== Team podiums ====
- 1 victory
- 8 podiums

No.	Season	Date	Location	Race	Level	Place	Teammates
1	1983–84	15 February 1984	(Socialist Federal Republic of Yugoslavia) Sarajevo, Yugoslavia	4 × 5 km Relay	Olympic Games^{[1]}	3rd	Määttä / Hyytiäinen / Matikainen
2	1983–84	26 February 1984	Falun, Sweden	4 × 5 km Relay	World Cup	2nd	Hyytiäinen / Määttä / Savolainen
3	1984–85	10 March 1985	Falun, Sweden	4 × 5 km Relay	World Cup	3rd	Määttä / Hyytiäinen / Matikainen
4	1987–88	21 February 1988	Calgary, Canada	4 × 5 km Relay F	Olympic Games^{[1]}	3rd	Määttä / Matikainen / Savolainen
5	1987–88	13 March 1988	Falun, Sweden	4 × 5 km Relay C	World Cup	2nd	Matikainen / Hyytiäinen / Määttä
6	1988–89	23 February 1989	Lahti, Finland	4 × 5 km Relay C/F	World Championships^{[1]}	1st	Määttä / Savolainen / Matikainen
7	1990–91	10 March 1991	Falun, Sweden	4 × 5 km Relay C	World Cup	3rd	Lukkarinen / Lahtinen / Savolainen
8	1991–92	8 March 1992	Funäsdalen, Sweden	4 × 5 km Relay C	World Cup	3rd	Riikola / Lukkarinen / Savolainen
9	1993–94	4 March 1994	Lahti, Finland	4 × 5 km Relay C	World Cup	3rd	Rolig / Pyykkönen / Lahtinen

Note: ^{1} Until the 1999 World Championships and the 1994 Olympics, World Championship and Olympic races were included in the World Cup scoring system.

== See also ==
- List of athletes with the most appearances at Olympic Games
