= Slovakia at the 1994 Winter Olympics =

- IOC code: SVK
- NOC: Slovak Olympic and Sports Committee
- Website: www.olympic.sk (in Slovak)

in Lillehammer
- Competitors: 42 (34 men, 8 women) in 7 sports
- Flag bearer: Peter Šťastný (ice hockey)
- Medals: Gold 0 Silver 0 Bronze 0 Total 0

Winter Olympics appearances (overview)
- 1994; 1998; 2002; 2006; 2010; 2014; 2018; 2022; 2026

Other related appearances
- Czechoslovakia (1924–1992)

Slovakia competed at the 1994 Winter Olympics in Lillehammer, Norway. It was the first Winter Games since the dissolution of Czechoslovakia, and so the Czech Republic and Slovakia competed as independent teams.

== Competitors ==
The following is the list of number of competitors in the Games.

Sport	Men	Women	Total
Alpine skiing	0	1	1
Biathlon	4	2	6
Cross-country skiing	1	4	5
Ice hockey	23	–	23
Luge	1	1	2
Nordic combined	3	–	3
Ski jumping	2	–	2
Total	34	8	42

== Alpine skiing ==
Women

Athlete	Event	Race 1	Race 2	Total	
Athlete	Event	Time	Time	Time	Rank
Lucia Medzihradská	Downhill			1:39.22	32
Lucia Medzihradská	Super-G			1:25.57	33
Lucia Medzihradská	Slalom	1:02.67	58.88	2:01.55	20

Women's combined

Athlete	Downhill	Slalom		Total	
Athlete	Time	Time 1	Time 2	Total time	Rank
Lucia Medzihradská	1:30.70	52.90	48.77	3:12.37	13

== Biathlon ==
Men

Event	Athlete	Misses ^{1}	Time	Rank
10 km Sprint	Daniel Krčmář	4	32:24.1	57
10 km Sprint	Pavel Kotraba	4	32:04.0	51

Event	Athlete	Time	Misses	Adjusted time ^{2}	Rank
20 km	Pavel Sládek	1'00:51.7	3	1'03:51.7	56
20 km	Lukáš Krejči	58:28.0	5	1'03:28.0	50

Men's 4 × 7.5 km relay

Athletes	Race		
Athletes	Misses ^{1}	Time	Rank
Pavel Sládek; Pavel Kotraba; Daniel Krčmář; Lukáš Krejči	3	1'40:00.3	18

Women

Event	Athlete	Misses ^{1}	Time	Rank
7.5 km Sprint	Martina Jašicová-Schwarzbacherová-Halinárová	2	27:11.6	15
7.5 km Sprint	Soňa Mihoková	2	27:03.8	12

Event	Athlete	Time	Misses	Adjusted time ^{2}	Rank
15 km	Soňa Mihoková	51:46.5	7	58:46.5	40
15 km	Martina Jašicová-Schwarzbacherová-Halinárová	51:56.4	2	53:56.4	6

^{1} A penalty loop of 150 metres had to be skied per missed target.
^{2} One minute added per missed target.

== Cross-country skiing ==
Men

Event	Athlete	Race	
Event	Athlete	Time	Rank
10 km C	Ivan Bátory	26:58.7	43
15 km pursuit^{1} F	Ivan Bátory	41:14.3	34

^{1} Starting delay based on 10 km results.
C = Classical style, F = Freestyle

Women

Event	Athlete	Race	
Event	Athlete	Time	Rank
5 km C	Tatiana Kutlíková	16:27.7	48
5 km C	Jaroslava Bukvajová	16:26.6	46
5 km C	Alžbeta Havrančíková	15:47.2	32
5 km C	Lubomíra Balážová	15:23.9	21
10 km pursuit^{2} F	Jaroslava Bukvajová	33:20.3	40
10 km pursuit^{2} F	Tatiana Kutlíková	32:45.0	35
10 km pursuit^{2} F	Lubomíra Balážová	31:20.1	24
10 km pursuit^{2} F	Alžbeta Havrančíková	30:02.0	17
15 km F	Tatiana Kutlíková	47:34.9	46
15 km F	Alžbeta Havrančíková	42:34.4	8
30 km C	Tatiana Kutlíková	1'36:41.4	43
30 km C	Alžbeta Havrančíková	1'33:41.5	32
30 km C	Lubomíra Balážová	1'30:58.7	18

^{2} Starting delay based on 5 km results.
C = Classical style, F = Freestyle

Women's 4 × 5 km relay

Athletes	Race	
Athletes	Time	Rank
Lubomíra Balážová; Jaroslava Bukvajová; Tatiana Kutlíková; Alžbeta Havrančíková	1'01:00.2	7

== Ice hockey ==
=== Group B ===
Twelve participating teams were placed in the two groups. After playing a round-robin, the top four teams in each group advanced to the Medal Round while the last two teams competed in the consolation round for the 9th to 12th places.

Team advanced to the Final Round
Team sent to compete in the Consolation round

Team	GP	W	L	T	GF	GA	PTS
Slovakia	5	3	0	2	26	14	8
Canada	5	3	1	1	17	11	7
Sweden	5	3	1	1	23	13	7
United States	5	1	1	3	21	17	5
Italy	5	1	4	0	15	31	2
France	5	0	4	1	11	27	1

13 February	Sweden	4:4	Slovakia
15 February	United States	3:3	Slovakia
17 February	Slovakia	10:4	Italy
19 February	Slovakia	3:1	Canada
21 February	Slovakia	6:2	France

=== Final Round ===
Quarter final - 23 February

Team 1	Score	Team 2
Slovakia	2–3 (OT)	Russia

Consolation round - 24 February

Team 1	Score	Team 2
Slovakia	6–5 (OT)	Germany

5th place match - 26 February

Team 1	Score	Team 2
Czech Republic	7–1	Slovakia

=== Leading scorers ===
Rk		GP	G	A	Pts
1	Žigmund Pálffy	8	3	7	10
2	Miroslav Šatan	8	9	0	9
3	Peter Šťastný	8	5	4	9

- Team roster:
  - Eduard Hartmann
  - Jaromír Dragan
  - Miroslav Michalek
  - Jerguš Bača
  - Marián Smerčiak
  - Miroslav Marcinko
  - Ľubomír Sekeráš
  - Vladimír Búřil
  - Stanislav Medřik
  - Ján Varholík
  - Róbert Švehla
  - Vlastimil Plavucha
  - Oto Haščák
  - Dušan Pohorelec
  - René Pucher
  - Miroslav Šatan
  - Branislav Jánoš
  - Roman Kontšek
  - Peter Šťastný
  - Ľubomír Kolník
  - Jozef Daňo
  - Róbert Petrovický
  - Žigmund Pálffy
- Head coach: Július Šupler

== Luge ==
Men

Athlete	Run 1		Run 2		Run 3		Run 4		Total	
Athlete	Time	Rank	Time	Rank	Time	Rank	Time	Rank	Time	Rank
Jozef Škvarek	51.775	23	51.835	23	51.300	19	51.612	19	3:26.522	19

Women

Athlete	Run 1		Run 2		Run 3		Run 4		Total	
Athlete	Time	Rank	Time	Rank	Time	Rank	Time	Rank	Time	Rank
Mária Jasenčáková	49.411	13	50.351	20	49.276	3	49.418	7	3:18.456	15

== Nordic combined ==
Men's individual

Events:

- normal hill ski jumping
- 15 km cross-country skiing (Start delay, based on ski jumping results.)

Athlete	Event	Ski Jumping		Cross-country time	Total rank
Athlete	Event	Points	Rank	Cross-country time	Total rank
Jozef Bachleda	Individual	140.5	52	53:44.4	51
Martin Bayer	Individual	142.5	51	56:19.9	52
Michal Giacko	Individual	184.0	36	47:02.5	26

== Ski jumping ==
Athlete	Event	Jump 1		Jump 2		Total	
Athlete	Event	Distance	Points	Distance	Points	Points	Rank
Miroslav Slušný	Normal hill	80.5	92.0	66.5	60.0	152.0	51
Martin Švagerko	Normal hill	81.5	97.5	90.0	115.5	213.0	25
Miroslav Slušný	Large hill	94.5	65.6	82.0	41.1	106.7	45
Martin Švagerko	Large hill	98.0	74.4	100.0	78.5	152.9	28

== Sources ==
- Official Olympic Reports
- Olympic Winter Games 1994, full results by sports-reference.com
