= Cross-country skiing at the 1994 Winter Olympics – Women's 15 kilometre freestyle =

Women's 15 kilometre freestyle at the XVII Olympic Winter Games
- Venue: Birkebeineren Ski Stadium
- Dates: 13 February 1994
- Competitors: 54 from 19 nations
- Winning time: 39:44.5

Medalists
| 1st place, gold medalist(s) | | Manuela Di Centa; Italy |
| 2nd place, silver medalist(s) | | Lyubov Yegorova; Russia |
| 3rd place, bronze medalist(s) | | Nina Gavrylyuk; Russia |

The women's 15 kilometre freestyle cross-country skiing competition at the 1994 Winter Olympics in Lillehammer, Norway, was held on 13 February at Birkebeineren Ski Stadium.

== Results ==
The results:

| Rank | Bib | Name | Country | Time | Deficit |
|---|---|---|---|---|---|
| 1st place, gold medalist(s) | 44 | Manuela Di Centa | Italy | 39:44.5 | – |
| 2nd place, silver medalist(s) | 47 | Lyubov Yegorova | Russia | 41:03.0 | +1:18.5 |
| 3rd place, bronze medalist(s) | 45 | Nina Gavrylyuk | Russia | 41:10.4 | +1:25.9 |
| 4 | 43 | Stefania Belmondo | Italy | 41:33.6 | +1:49.1 |
| 5 | 52 | Larisa Lazutina | Russia | 41:57.6 | +2:13.1 |
| 6 | 46 | Yelena Välbe | Russia | 42:26.6 | +2:42.1 |
| 7 | 36 | Antonina Ordina | Sweden | 42:29.1 | +2:44.6 |
| 8 | 50 | Alžbeta Havrančíková | Slovakia | 42:34.4 | +2:49.9 |
| 9 | 34 | Sophie Villeneuve | France | 42:41.3 | +2:56.8 |
| 10 | 42 | Anita Moen | Norway | 42:42.9 | +2:58.4 |
| 11 | 24 | Fumiko Aoki | Japan | 43:01.4 | +3:16.9 |
| 12 | 49 | Gabriella Paruzzi | Italy | 43:05.1 | +3:20.6 |
| 13 | 40 | Elin Nilsen | Norway | 43:19.8 | +3:35.3 |
| 14 | 41 | Marit Wold | Norway | 43:25.1 | +3:40.6 |
| 14 | 54 | Kateřina Neumannová | Czech Republic | 43:25.1 | +3:40.6 |
| 16 | 39 | Merja Kuusisto | Finland | 43:50.7 | +4:06.2 |
| 17 | 48 | Marie-Helene Östlund | Sweden | 44:03.6 | +4:19.1 |
| 18 | 35 | Bernadeta Bocek | Poland | 44:12.8 | +4:28.3 |
| 19 | 17 | Anna-Lena Fritzon | Sweden | 44:26.9 | +4:42.4 |
| 20 | 21 | Bente Martinsen | Norway | 44:35.0 | +4:50.5 |
| 21 | 51 | Sylvia Honegger | Switzerland | 44:41.9 | +4:57.4 |
| 22 | 11 | Dorota Kwaśny | Poland | 44:43.1 | +4:58.6 |
| 23 | 38 | Piret Niglas | Estonia | 44:48.3 | +5:03.8 |
| 24 | 20 | Mari Hietala | Finland | 44:56.8 | +5:12.3 |
| 25 | 27 | Halina Nowak-Guńka | Poland | 45:02.2 | +5:17.7 |
| 26 | 23 | Sabina Valbusa | Italy | 45:03.9 | +5:19.4 |
| 27 | 53 | Iryna Taranenko | Ukraine | 45:19.1 | +5:34.6 |
| 28 | 29 | Kristina Šmigun | Estonia | 45:21.1 | +5:36.6 |
| 29 | 4 | Annika Evaldsson | Sweden | 45:25.4 | +5:40.9 |
| 30 | 26 | Barbara Mettler | Switzerland | 45:26.9 | +5:42.4 |
| 31 | 15 | Martina Vondrová | Czech Republic | 45:29.1 | +5:44.6 |
| 32 | 32 | Vida Vencienė | Lithuania | 45:41.2 | +5:56.7 |
| 33 | 22 | Yelena Sinkevich | Belarus | 45:45.4 | +6:00.9 |
| 34 | 31 | Laura McCabe | United States | 45:51.1 | +6:06.6 |
| 35 | 14 | Laura Wilson | United States | 45:59.9 | +6:15.4 |
| 36 | 13 | Sumiko Yokoyama | Japan | 46:00.4 | +6:15.9 |
| 37 | 25 | Leslie Thompson | United States | 46:10.3 | +6:25.8 |
| 38 | 12 | Brigitte Albrecht | Switzerland | 46:11.9 | +6:27.4 |
| 39 | 16 | Isabelle Mancini | France | 46:16.2 | +6:31.7 |
| 40 | 8 | Mićhalina Maciuszek | Poland | 46:43.0 | +6:58.5 |
| 41 | 30 | Iveta Zelingerová | Czech Republic | 46:56.3 | +7:11.8 |
| 42 | 3 | Nina Kemppel | United States | 46:56.8 | +7:12.3 |
| 43 | 37 | Oksana Kotova | Kazakhstan | 47:02.1 | +7:17.6 |
| 44 | 33 | Irina Nikulchina | Bulgaria | 47:03.5 | +7:19.0 |
| 45 | 19 | Cristel Vahtra | Estonia | 47:04.1 | +7:19.6 |
| 46 | 28 | Tatiana Kutlíková | Slovakia | 47:34.9 | +7:50.4 |
| 47 | 18 | Yelena Volodina | Kazakhstan | 47:35.6 | +7:51.1 |
| 48 | 1 | Lucie Chroustovská | Czech Republic | 47:37.8 | +7:53.3 |
| 49 | 9 | Silja Suija | Estonia | 47:47.5 | +8:03.0 |
| 50 | 10 | Svetlana Kamotskaya | Belarus | 47:56.5 | +8:12.0 |
| 51 | 6 | Yelena Piiraynen | Belarus | 48:45.3 | +9:00.8 |
| 52 | 7 | Ineta Kravale | Latvia | 49:37.7 | +9:53.2 |
| 53 | 5 | Yelena Chernetsova | Kazakhstan | 49:56.7 | +10:12.2 |
| | 2 | Sylvie Giry-Rousset | France | DNF | |
