= Cross-country skiing at the 1992 Winter Olympics – Women's 4 × 5 kilometre relay =

Women's 4 × 5 kilometre relay at the XVI Olympic Winter Games
- Pictogram for cross country
- Venue: Les Saisies
- Dates: 18 February 1992
- Competitors: 52 (13 teams) from 13 nations
- Winning time: 59:34.8

Medalists
1st place, gold medalist(s)		Yelena Välbe; Raisa Smetanina; Larisa Lazutina; Lyubov Yegorova	Unified Team
2nd place, silver medalist(s)		Solveig Pedersen; Inger Helene Nybråten; Trude Dybendahl; Elin Nilsen	Norway
3rd place, bronze medalist(s)		Bice Vanzetta; Manuela Di Centa; Gabriella Paruzzi; Stefania Belmondo	Italy

The women's 4 × 5 km relay cross-country skiing competition at the 1992 Winter Olympics in Albertville, France, took place on 18 February at Les Saisies. The race saw the Unified Team beat Norway by 21.6 seconds, with Italy finishing third.

== Results ==
Rank	Bib	Country	Time	Deficit
1st place, gold medalist(s)	1	Unified Team; Yelena Välbe; Raisa Smetanina; Larisa Lazutina; Lyubov Yegorova	59:34.8	–
2nd place, silver medalist(s)	3	Norway; Solveig Pedersen; Inger Helene Nybråten; Trude Dybendahl; Elin Nilsen	59:56.4	+21.6
3rd place, bronze medalist(s)	2	Italy; Bice Vanzetta; Manuela Di Centa; Gabriella Paruzzi; Stefania Belmondo	1:00:25.9	+0:51.1
4	4	Finland; Marja-Liisa Kirvesniemi; Pirkko Määttä; Jaana Savolainen; Marjut Lukkarinen	1:00:52.9	+1:18.1
5	9	France; Carole Stanisière; Sylvie Giry-Rousset; Sophie Villeneuve; Isabelle Mancini	1:01:30.7	+1:55.9
6	8	Czechoslovakia; Lubomíra Balážová; Kateřina Neumannová; Alžbeta Havrančíková; Iveta Zelingerová	1:01:37.4	+2:02.6
7	6	Sweden; Magdalena Wallin; Carina Görlin; Karin Säterkvist; Marie-Helene Westin	1:01:54.5	+2:19.7
8	5	Germany; Heike Wezel; Gabriele Heß; Simone Opitz; Ina Kümmel	1:02:22.6	+2:47.8
9	10	Switzerland; Sylvia Honegger; Brigitte Albrecht; Natascia Leonardi; Elvira Knecht	1:02:54.1	+3:19.3
10	7	Poland; Małgorzata Ruchała; Dorota Kwaśny; Bernadetta Bocek; Halina Nowak-Guńka	1:03:23.0	+3:48.2
11	11	Canada; Angela Schmidt-Foster; Rhonda Delong; Jane Vincent; Lucy Steele-Masson	1:03:38.5	+4:03.7
12	13	Japan; Miwa Ota; Fumiko Aoki; Naomi Hoshikawa; Yumi Inomata	1:04:09.3	+4:34.5
13	12	United States; Nancy Fiddler; Ingrid Butts; Leslie Thompson; Betsy Youngman	1:04:48.5	+5:13.7
