= Cross-country skiing at the 1998 Winter Olympics – Women's 15 kilometre classical =

Women's 15 kilometre classical at the XVIII Olympic Winter Games
- Venue: Snow Harp
- Dates: 8 February 1998
- Competitors: 65 from 24 nations
- Winning time: 46:55.4

Medalists
1st place, gold medalist(s)		Olga Danilova	Russia
2nd place, silver medalist(s)		Larisa Lazutina	Russia
3rd place, bronze medalist(s)		Anita Moen-Guidon	Norway

The women's 15 kilometre classical cross-country skiing competition at the 1998 Winter Olympics in Nagano, Japan, was held on 8 February at Snow Harp.

Each skier started at half a minute intervals, skiing the entire 15 kilometre course. The defending Olympic champion was the Italian Manuela Di Centa, who won in Lillehammer, then in freestyle technique.

== Results ==
Rank	Bib	Name	Country	Time	Deficit
1st place, gold medalist(s)	29	Olga Danilova	Russia	46:55.4	
2nd place, silver medalist(s)	20	Larisa Lazutina	Russia	47:01.0	+5.6
3rd place, bronze medalist(s)	31	Anita Moen-Guidon	Norway	47:52.6	+57.2
4	23	Iryna Terelya	Ukraine	48:10.2	+1:14.8
5	33	Marit Mikkelsplass	Norway	48:12.5	+1:17.1
6	16	Bente Martinsen	Norway	48:19.0	+1:23.6
6	21	Trude Dybendahl Hartz	Norway	48:19.0	+1:23.6
8	26	Stefania Belmondo	Italy	48:57.7	+2:02.3
9	19	Kateřina Neumannová	Czech Republic	49:01.9	+2:06.5
10	50	Jaroslava Bukvajová	Slovakia	49:02.0	+2:06.6
11	17	Valentyna Shevchenko	Ukraine	49:12.9	+2:17.5
12	39	Tuulikki Pyykkönen	Finland	49:13.5	+2:18.1
13	53	Katrin Šmigun	Estonia	49:18.9	+2:23.5
14	34	Gabriella Paruzzi	Italy	49:20.7	+2:25.3
15	44	Yelena Sinkevitch	Belarus	49:20.8	+2:25.4
16	27	Svetlana Nageykina	Russia	49:22.5	+2:27.1
17	18	Yelena Välbe	Russia	49:25.9	+2:30.5
18	22	Satu Salonen	Finland	49:27.6	+2:32.2
19	25	Antonina Ordina	Sweden	50:12.6	+3:17.2
20	4	Svetlana Deshevykh	Kazakhstan	50:28.0	+3:32.6
21	49	Constanze Blum	Germany	50:30.3	+3:34.9
22	30	Sylvia Honegger	Switzerland	50:31.9	+3:36.5
23	9	Maryna Pestryakova	Ukraine	50:45.6	+3:50.2
24	10	Sumiko Yokoyama	Japan	50:55.3	+3:59.9
25	2	Karin Säterkvist	Sweden	51:02.6	+4:07.2
26	24	Renate Roider	Austria	51:07.0	+4:11.6
27	67	Antonella Confortola	Italy	51:07.6	+4:12.2
28	1	Sigrid Wille	Germany	51:19.3	+4:23.9
29	7	Jana Šaldová	Czech Republic	51:33.8	+4:38.4
30	56	Karin Moroder	Italy	51:36.1	+4:40.7
31	64	Milla Jauho	Finland	51:38.6	+4:43.2
32	15	Oxana Yatskaya	Kazakhstan	51:39.7	+4:44.3
33	5	Bernadeta Piatrowska	Poland	51:40.7	+4:45.3
34	45	Kumiko Yokoyama	Japan	51:48.7	+4:53.3
35	38	Elin Ek	Sweden	51:51.0	+4:55.6
36	66	Manuela Henkel	Germany	51:53.4	+4:58.0
37	55	Fumiko Aoki	Japan	51:53.7	+4:58.3
38	40	Anke Reschwamm Schulze	Germany	51:54.0	+4:58.6
39	48	Svetlana Kamotskaya	Belarus	51:59.0	+5:03.6
40	6	Õnne Kurg	Estonia	52:08.3	+5:12.9
41	8	Kati Sundqvist	Finland	52:14.1	+5:18.7
42	11	Yekaterina Antonyuk	Belarus	52:24.5	+5:29.1
43	68	Irina Skripnik	Belarus	52:26.2	+5:30.8
44	57	Iveta Zelingerová	Czech Republic	52:26.3	+5:30.9
45	37	Annick Vaxelaire-Pierrel	France	52:30.1	+5:34.7
46	62	Cristel Vahtra	Estonia	52:32.7	+5:37.3
47	14	Kerrin Petty	United States	52:45.3	+5:49.9
48	35	Suzanne King	United States	52:58.9	+6:03.5
49	47	Svetlana Shishkina	Kazakhstan	53:13.7	+6:18.3
50	52	Dorota Kwasna	Poland	53:42.6	+6:47.2
51	43	Luan Zhengrong	China	53:48.4	+6:53.0
52	12	Nina Kemppel	United States	53:57.2	+7:01.8
53	58	Laura Wilson	United States	54:10.4	+7:15.0
54	69	Emiko Sato	Japan	54:11.1	+7:15.7
55	13	Guo Dongling	China	54:50.6	+7:55.2
56	42	Monica Lăzăruț	Romania	55:18.2	+8:22.8
57	61	Elena Antonova	Kazakhstan	55:34.0	+8:38.6
58	60	Eliza Surdyka	Poland	55:37.5	+8:42.1
59	3	Milaine Theriault	Canada	55:38.2	+8:42.8
60	28	Beckie Scott	Canada	55:43.7	+8:48.3
61	65	Inara Rudko	Latvia	56:07.8	+9:12.4
62	59	Marie-Odile Raymond	Canada	56:53.3	+9:57.9
63	54	Irina Nikulchina	Bulgaria	57:07.2	+10:11.8
64	51	Kazimiera Strolienė	Lithuania	59:48.3	+12:52.9
	46	Elena Gayasova	Ukraine	Disqualified	
	32	Maria Theurl	Austria	Did not start	
	36	Natascia Leonardi	Switzerland	Did not start	
	41	Jaime Fortier	Canada	Did not start	
	63	Anette Fanqvist	Sweden	Did not start	
