= Lyudmila Dideleva =

Belarusian cross-country skier (born 1976)

Personal information
- Nationality: Belarusian
- Born: 23 December 1976 (age 48); Vitebsk, Byelorussian SSR, Soviet Union

Sport
- Sport: Cross-country skiing

Lyudmila Dideleva (born 23 December 1976) is a Belarusian cross-country skier. She competed in three events at the 1994 Winter Olympics.
