= Nataliya Shtaymets =

Kazakhstani cross-country skier (born 1963)

Personal information
- Nationality: Kazakhstani
- Born: 5 November 1963 (age 62)

Sport
- Sport: Cross-country skiing

Nataliya Shtaymets (Наталья Викторовна Штаймец, born 5 November 1963) is a Kazakhstani cross-country skier. She competed in two events at the 1994 Winter Olympics.
