= Yelena Piraynen =

Belarusian cross-country skier (born 1969)

Personal information
- Nationality: Belarusian
- Born: 15 March 1969 (age 56); Minsk, Byelorussian SSR, Soviet Union

Sport
- Sport: Cross-country skiing

Yelena Piraynen (born 15 March 1969) is a Belarusian cross-country skier. She competed in four events at the 1994 Winter Olympics. She was the first woman to represent Belarus at the Olympics.
