= Ineta Kravale =

Latvian cross-country skier (born 1959)

Personal information
- Nationality: Latvian
- Born: 20 April 1959 (age 67) Pļaviņas, Soviet Union
- Height: 165 cm (5 ft 5 in)
- Weight: 56 kg (123 lb)

Sport
- Sport: Cross-country skiing

Achievements and titles
- Olympic finals: 1994 Winter Olympics

Ineta Kravale (born 20 April 1959) is a Latvian cross-country skier. She competed in three events at the 1994 Winter Olympics.
