= Oksana Kotova =

Kazakhstani cross-country skier (born 1974)

Personal information
- Nationality: Kazakhstani
- Born: 21 December 1974 (age 51)

Sport
- Sport: Cross-country skiing

Oksana Kotova (Оксана Борисовна Котова, born 21 December 1974) is a Kazakhstani cross-country skier. She competed in five events at the 1994 Winter Olympics.
