= Cross-country skiing at the 1994 Winter Olympics =

Cross-country skiing at the XVII Olympic Winter Games
- Venue: Birkebeineren Ski Stadium
- Dates: 13–27 February
- No. of events: 10
- Competitors: 197 (117 men, 80 women) from 35 nations

The 1994 Winter Olympic Games cross-country skiing results.

== Medal summary ==
=== Medal table ===
Rank	Nation	Gold	Silver	Bronze	Total
1	Norway	3	4	1	8
2	Italy	3	2	4	9
3	Russia	3	1	1	5
4	Kazakhstan	1	2	0	3
5	Finland	0	1	4	5
Totals (5 entries)		10	10	10	30

=== Men's events ===
Event	Gold		Silver		Bronze	
10 km classical	Bjørn Dæhlie; Norway	24:20.1	Vladimir Smirnov; Kazakhstan	24:38.3	Marco Albarello; Italy	24:42.4
15 km freestyle pursuit	Bjørn Dæhlie; Norway	1:00:08.8	Vladimir Smirnov; Kazakhstan	1:00:38.0	Silvio Fauner; Italy	1:01:48.6
30 km freestyle	Thomas Alsgaard; Norway	1:12:26.4	Bjørn Dæhlie; Norway	1:13:13.6	Mika Myllylä; Finland	1:14:14.5
50 km classical	Vladimir Smirnov; Kazakhstan	2:07:20.3	Mika Myllylä; Finland	2:08:41.9	Sture Sivertsen; Norway	2:08:49.0
4 × 10 km relay	Italy; Maurilio de Zolt; Marco Albarello; Giorgio Vanzetta; Silvio Fauner	1:41:15.0	Norway; Sture Sivertsen; Vegard Ulvang; Thomas Alsgaard; Bjørn Dæhlie	1:41:15.4	Finland; Mika Myllylä; Harri Kirvesniemi; Jari Räsänen; Jari Isometsä	1:42:15.6

The winning Italian team was among the last carriers of the Olympic torch in the stadium during the 2006 Winter Olympics opening ceremony in Turin, Italy.

=== Women's events ===
Event	Gold		Silver		Bronze	
5 km classical	Lyubov Yegorova; Russia	14:08.8	Manuela Di Centa; Italy	14:28.3	Marja-Liisa Kirvesniemi; Finland	14:36.0
10 km freestyle pursuit	Lyubov Yegorova; Russia	41:38.1	Manuela Di Centa; Italy	41:46.4	Stefania Belmondo; Italy	42:21.1
15 km freestyle	Manuela Di Centa; Italy	39:44.5	Lyubov Yegorova; Russia	41:03.0	Nina Gavrylyuk; Russia	41:10.4
30 km classical	Manuela Di Centa; Italy	1:25:41.6	Marit Wold; Norway	1:25:57.8	Marja-Liisa Kirvesniemi; Finland	1:26:13.6
4 × 5 km relay	Russia; Yelena Välbe; Larisa Lazutina; Nina Gavrylyuk; Lyubov Yegorova	57:12.5	Norway; Trude Dybendahl; Inger Helene Nybråten; Elin Nilsen; Anita Moen	57:42.6	Italy; Bice Vanzetta; Manuela Di Centa; Gabriella Paruzzi; Stefania Belmondo	58:42.6

=== Participating NOCs ===
Thirty-five nations sent ski runners to compete in the events.

- Australia
- Austria
- Belarus
- Bosnia and Herzegovina
- Bulgaria
- Canada
- Croatia
- Czech Republic
- Denmark
- Estonia
- Fiji
- Finland
- France
- Germany
- Great Britain
- Greece
- Iceland
- Italy
- Japan
- Kazakhstan
- Latvia
- Liechtenstein
- Lithuania
- Norway
- Poland
- Romania
- Russia
- Slovakia
- South Korea
- Spain
- Switzerland
- Sweden
- Turkey
- Ukraine
- United States

== See also ==
- Cross-country skiing at the 1994 Winter Paralympics
