= Bobsleigh at the 1992 Winter Olympics – Four-man =

Four-man at the XVI Olympic Winter Games
- Venue: La Plagne
- Dates: February 21 — 22, 1992
- Competitors: 124 from 20 nations
- Winning time: 3:53.90

Medalists
1st place, gold medalist(s)		Austria; Ingo Appelt, Harald Winkler, Gerhard Haidacher, Thomas Schroll
2nd place, silver medalist(s)		Germany; Wolfgang Hoppe, Bogdan Musioł, Axel Kühn, René Hannemann
3rd place, bronze medalist(s)		Switzerland; Gustav Weder, Donat Acklin, Lorenz Schindelholz, Curdin Morell

The Four-man bobsleigh competition at the 1992 Winter Olympics in Albertville was held on 21 and 22 February, at La Plagne.

== Results ==
Rank	Country	Athletes	Run 1	Run 2	Run 3	Run 4	Total
1st place, gold medalist(s)	Austria (AUT-1)	Ingo Appelt; Harald Winkler; Gerhard Haidacher; Thomas Schroll	57.74	58.85	58.52	58.79	3:53.90
2nd place, silver medalist(s)	Germany (GER-1)	Wolfgang Hoppe; Bogdan Musioł; Axel Kühn; René Hannemann	58.00	58.52	58.68	58.72	3:53.92
3rd place, bronze medalist(s)	Switzerland (SUI-1)	Gustav Weder; Donat Acklin; Lorenz Schindelholz; Curdin Morell	57.97	58.78	58.59	58.79	3:54.13
4	Canada (CAN-1)	Chris Lori; Ken LeBlanc; Cal Langford; Dave MacEachern	58.00	58.71	58.66	58.87	3:54.24
5	Switzerland (SUI-2)	Christian Meili; Bruno Gerber; Christian Reich; Gerold Löffler	58.15	58.75	58.59	58.89	3:54.38
6	Germany (GER-2)	Harald Czudaj; Tino Bonk; Axel Jang; Alexander Szelig	58.54	58.55	58.62	58.71	3:54.42
7	Great Britain (GBR-1)	Mark Tout; George Farrell; Paul Field; Lenny Paul	58.49	58.87	58.73	58.80	3:54.89
8	France (FRA-1)	Christophe Flacher; Claude Dasse; Thierry Tribondeau; Gabriel Fourmigué	58.45	58.79	58.78	58.89	3:54.91
9	United States (USA-1)	Randy Will; Joe Sawyer; Karlos Kirby; Chris Coleman	58.57	58.71	58.75	58.89	3:54.92
10	Austria (AUT-2)	Gerhard Rainer; Thomas Bachler; Carsten Nentwig; Martin Schützenauer	58.27	58.85	59.08	58.81	3:55.01
11	United States (USA-2)	Chuck Leonowicz; Bob Weissenfels; Bryan Leturgez; Jeff Woodard	58.74	58.99	58.56	58.94	3:55.23
12	Italy (ITA-1)	Pasquale Gesuito; Antonio Tartaglia; Paolo Canedi; Stefano Ticci	58.78	58.83	59.12	59.15	3:55.88
13	Great Britain (GBR-2)	Nick Phipps; Edd Horler; Colin Rattigan; David Armstrong	58.86	58.83	59.29	58.93	3:55.91
14	Latvia (LAT-1)	Sandis Prūsis; Juris Tone; Ivars Bērzups; Adris Plūksna	59.05	59.07	58.72	59.08	3:55.92
15	Italy (ITA-2)	Günther Huber; Marco Andreatta; Thomas Rottensteiner; Marcantonio Stiffi	58.76	59.11	58.97	59.14	3:55.98
16	Latvia (LAT-2)	Zintis Ekmanis; Aldis Intlers; Boriss Artemjevs; Otomārs Rihters	59.02	58.99	59.35	59.36	3:56.72
17	Japan	Toshio Wakita; Ryoji Yamazaki; Fuminori Tsushima; Naomi Takewaki	59.23	59.30	59.33	59.38	3:57.24
18	France (FRA-2)	Bruno Mingeon; Stéphane Poirot; Didier Stil; Dominique Klinnik	59.03	59.33	59.52	59.53	3:57.41
19	Unified Team (EUN-1)	Oleg Sukhoruchenko; Oleksandr Bortiuk; Vladimir Lyubovitsky; Andrey Gorokhov	59.05	60.05	58.94	59.39	3:57.43
20	Romania	Paul Neagu; Laszlo Hodos; Laurențiu Budur; Costel Petrariu	59.04	59.52	59.50	59.38	3:57.44
21	Czechoslovakia	Jiří Dzmura; Pavel Puškár; Karel Dostál; Roman Hrabaň	59.30	59.66	59.92	59.67	3:58.55
22	Bulgaria	Tsvetozar Viktorov; Dimitar Dimitrov; Yordan Ivanov; Valentin Atanasov	60.05	60.28	60.09	60.17	4:00.59
23	Unified Team (EUN-2)	Vladimir Yefimov; Oleg Petrov; Sergey Kruglov; Aleksandr Pashkov	59.80	60.19	60.34	60.26	4:00.59
24	Yugoslavia	Zdravko Stojnić; Dragiša Jovanović; Miro Pandurević; Ognjen Sokolović	60.16	60.28	60.59	60.27	4:01.30
25	Jamaica	Dudley Stokes; Ricky McIntosh; Michael White; Chris Stokes	60.12	60.48	60.38	60.39	4:01.37
26	Chinese Taipei	Chen Chin-san; Chen Chin-sen; Hsu Kuo-jung; Chang Min-jung	60.31	60.45	60.52	60.66	4:01.94
27	Monaco	Albert, Prince Grimaldi; Gilbert Bessi; Michel Vatrican; David Tomatis	60.49	60.66	60.74	60.74	4:02.63
28	Mexico	Luis Adrián Tamés; Ricardo Rodríguez; Francisco Negrete; Carlos Casar	60.97	61.36	61.30	61.51	4:05.14
29	Virgin Islands (ISV-2)	Sven Petersen; Michael Juhlin; James Withey; Paul Zar	62.45	62.52	62.73	62.65	4:10.35
-	Canada (CAN-2)	Dennis Marineau; Chris Farstad; Jack Pyc; Sheridon Baptiste	58.61	59.00	DQ	-	-
-	Virgin Islands (ISV-1)	Daniel Burgner; Ernest Mathias; David Entwistle; Bill Neill	60.92	61.08	DNS	-	-
