= Bulgaria at the 1992 Winter Olympics =

- IOC code: BUL
- NOC: Bulgarian Olympic Committee
- Website: www.bgolympic.org (in Bulgarian and English)

in Albertville
- Competitors: 30 in 7 sports
- Flag bearer: Iva Karagiozova-Shkodreva
- Medals: Gold 0 Silver 0 Bronze 0 Total 0

Winter Olympics appearances (overview)
- 1936; 1948; 1952; 1956; 1960; 1964; 1968; 1972; 1976; 1980; 1984; 1988; 1992; 1994; 1998; 2002; 2006; 2010; 2014; 2018; 2022; 2026

Bulgaria competed at the 1992 Winter Olympics in Albertville, France.

== Competitors ==
The following is the list of number of competitors in the Games.

Sport	Men	Women	Total
Alpine skiing	3	0	3
Biathlon	5	5	10
Bobsleigh	5	–	5
Cross-country skiing	5	1	6
Figure skating	0	1	1
Luge	2	1	3
Ski jumping	3	–	3
Total	22	8	30

== Alpine skiing ==
Men

Athlete	Event	Race 1	Race 2	Total	
Athlete	Event	Time	Time	Time	Rank
Petar Dichev	Downhill			2:01.21	37
Lyubomir Popov	Super-G			DSQ	–
Borislav Dimitrachkov	Super-G			1:20.67	52
Petar Dichev	Super-G			1:18.87	45
Borislav Dimitrachkov	Giant Slalom	1:12.08	1:09.57	2:21.65	41
Lyubomir Popov	Giant Slalom	1:10.72	1:07.29	2:18.01	33
Petar Dichev	Giant Slalom	1:09.85	1:06.53	2:16.38	30
Lyubomir Popov	Slalom	DNF	–	DNF	–
Borislav Dimitrachkov	Slalom	57.48	57.67	1:55.15	33
Petar Dichev	Slalom	56.21	56.70	1:52.91	26

Men's combined

Athlete	Downhill	Slalom		Total	
Athlete	Time	Time 1	Time 2	Points	Rank
Petar Dichev	1:53.52	50.80	52.80	101.59	22
Lyubomir Popov	1:52.74	48.72	DNF	DNF	–

== Biathlon ==
Men

Event	Athlete	Misses ^{1}	Time	Rank
10 km Sprint	Spas Gulev	2	30:16.6	74
10 km Sprint	Boycho Popov	1	29:44.6	65
10 km Sprint	Spas Zlatev	1	28:45.9	54
10 km Sprint	Krasimir Videnov	1	28:04.0	35

Event	Athlete	Time	Misses	Adjusted time ^{2}	Rank
20 km	Boycho Popov	1'04:03.7	3	1'07:03.7	73
20 km	Khristo Vodenicharov	1'01:32.7	4	1'05:32.7	68
20 km	Spas Zlatev	1'00:26.2	1	1'01:26.2	31
20 km	Krasimir Videnov	58:32.5	1	59:32.5	14

Men's 4 x 7.5 km relay

Athletes	Race		
Athletes	Misses ^{1}	Time	Rank
Krasimir Videnov; Khristo Vodenicharov; Spas Gulev; Spas Zlatev	0	1'31:49.6	14

Women

Event	Athlete	Misses ^{1}	Time	Rank
7.5 km Sprint	Iva Karagiozova-Shkodreva	5	27:42.6	33
7.5 km Sprint	Vera Vucheva	1	27:01.0	23
7.5 km Sprint	Silvana Blagoeva	2	25:33.5	8
7.5 km Sprint	Nadezhda Aleksieva	0	24:55.8	4

Event	Athlete	Time	Misses	Adjusted time ^{2}	Rank
15 km	Silvana Blagoeva	51:42.3	5	56:42.3	25
15 km	Iva Karagiozova-Shkodreva	51:22.4	4	55:22.4	17
15 km	Mariya Manolova	52:10.6	3	55:10.6	16
15 km	Nadezhda Aleksieva	51:30.2	1	52:30.2	5

Women's 3 x 7.5 km relay

Athletes	Race		
Athletes	Misses ^{1}	Time	Rank
Silvana Blagoeva; Nadezhda Aleksieva; Iva Karagiozova-Shkodreva	0	1'18:54.8	4

^{1} A penalty loop of 150 metres had to be skied per missed target.
^{2} One minute added per missed target.

== Bobsleigh ==
Sled	Athletes	Event	Run 1		Run 2		Run 3		Run 4		Total	
Sled	Athletes	Event	Time	Rank	Time	Rank	Time	Rank	Time	Rank	Time	Rank
BUL-1	Tsvetozar Viktorov; Valentin Atanasov	Two-man	1:02.35	31	1:02.11	25	1:02.20	25	1:02.11	21	4:08.77	28
BUL-2	Nikolay Dimitrov; Dimitar Dimitrov	Two-man	1:02.89	36	1:03.59	39	1:03.86	41	1:03.43	38	4:13.62	39

Sled	Athletes	Event	Run 1		Run 2		Run 3		Run 4		Total	
Sled	Athletes	Event	Time	Rank	Time	Rank	Time	Rank	Time	Rank	Time	Rank
BUL-1	Tsvetozar Viktorov; Dimitar Dimitrov; Yordan Ivanov; Valentin Atanasov	Four-man	1:00.05	24	1:00.28	24	1:00.09	22	1:00.17	22	4:00.59	22

== Cross-country skiing ==
Men

Event	Athlete	Race	
Event	Athlete	Time	Rank
10 km C	Petar Zografov	35:42.2	86
10 km C	Iskren Plankov	32:49.2	70
10 km C	Ivan Smilenov	31:54.7	55
10 km C	Slavcho Batinkov	31:47.4	53
15 km pursuit^{1} F	Petar Zografov	50:15.6	71
15 km pursuit^{1} F	Slavcho Batinkov	46:41.6	63
30 km C	Iskren Plankov	1'36:58.2	67
30 km C	Slavcho Batinkov	1'34:39.2	63
30 km C	Ivan Smilenov	1'32:25.5	53
50 km F	Spas Zlatev	2'28:07.1	59
50 km F	Petar Zografov	2'22:20.8	50

^{1} Starting delay based on 10 km results.
C = Classical style, F = Freestyle

Men's 4 × 10 km relay

Athletes	Race	
Athletes	Time	Rank
Ivan Smilenov; Iskren Plankov; Petar Zografov; Slavcho Batinkov	1'51:28.0	13

Women

Event	Athlete	Race	
Event	Athlete	Time	Rank
5 km C	Reneta Bancheva	16:16.0	50
10 km pursuit^{2} F	Reneta Bancheva	32:28.3	50
15 km C	Reneta Bancheva	50:17.4	45
30 km F	Reneta Bancheva	1'41:44.9	52

^{2} Starting delay based on 5 km results.
C = Classical style, F = Freestyle

== Figure skating ==
Women

Athlete	SP	FS	TFP	Rank
Viktoria Dimitrova	18	17	26.0	17

== Luge ==
(Men's) Doubles

Athletes	Run 1		Run 2		Total	
Athletes	Time	Rank	Time	Rank	Time	Rank
Ilko Karacholov; Ivan Karacholov	47.538	17	47.514	17	1:35.052	17

Women

Athlete	Run 1		Run 2		Run 3		Run 4		Total	
Athlete	Time	Rank	Time	Rank	Time	Rank	Time	Rank	Time	Rank
Albena Zdravkova	48.961	23	48.880	24	49.127	24	49.271	24	3:16.239	24

== Ski jumping ==
Athlete	Event	Jump 1		Jump 2		Total	
Athlete	Event	Distance	Points	Distance	Points	Points	Rank
Zakhari Sotirov	Normal hill	74.0	78.9	75.5	78.3	157.2	56
Vladimir Breychev	Normal hill	78.5	87.6	77.5	85.0	172.6	50
Emil Zografski	Normal hill	80.5	95.3	77.5	88.0	183.3	40
Emil Zografski	Large hill	77.5	35.0	83.5	47.4	82.4	56
Zakhari Sotirov	Large hill	80.0	38.0	87.0	54.3	92.3	55
Vladimir Breychev	Large hill	91.0	61.4	93.5	64.9	126.3	46
