= Bobsleigh at the 1992 Winter Olympics – Two-man =

Two-man at the XVI Olympic Winter Games
- Venue: La Plagne
- Dates: February 15 — 16, 1992
- Competitors: 92 from 25 nations
- Winning time: 4:03.26

Medalists
1st place, gold medalist(s)		Switzerland; Gustav Weder, Donat Acklin
2nd place, silver medalist(s)		Germany; Rudi Lochner, Markus Zimmermann
3rd place, bronze medalist(s)		Germany; Christoph Langen, Günther Eger

The Two-man bobsleigh competition at the 1992 Winter Olympics in Albertville was held on 15 and 16 February, at La Plagne.

== Results ==
Rank	Country	Athletes	Run 1	Run 2	Run 3	Run 4	Total
1st place, gold medalist(s)	Switzerland (SUI-1)	Gustav Weder; Donat Acklin	60.49	60.97	60.84	60.96	4:03.26
2nd place, silver medalist(s)	Germany (GER-1)	Rudi Lochner; Markus Zimmermann	60.69	61.00	60.90	60.96	4:03.55
3rd place, bronze medalist(s)	Germany (GER-2)	Christoph Langen; Günther Eger	60.33	61.06	61.14	61.10	4:03.63
4	Austria (AUT-2)	Ingo Appelt; Thomas Schroll	60.46	60.87	61.09	61.25	4:03.67
5	Italy (ITA-1)	Günther Huber; Stefano Ticci	60.36	60.87	61.08	61.41	4:03.72
6	Great Britain (GBR-1)	Mark Tout; Lenny Paul	60.10	61.10	61.44	61.23	4:03.87
7	United States (USA-1)	Brian Shimer; Herschel Walker	60.34	61.27	61.22	61.12	4:03.95
8	Austria (AUT-1)	Gerhard Rainer; Thomas Bachler	60.33	61.20	61.18	61.29	4:04.00
9	Canada (CAN-2)	Dennis Marineau; Chris Farstad	60.19	61.36	61.18	61.35	4:04.08
10	Switzerland (SUI-2)	Christian Meili; Christian Reich	60.23	61.31	61.44	61.38	4:04.36
11	Canada (CAN-1)	Greg Haydenluck; Dave MacEachern	60.69	61.09	61.57	61.49	4:04.84
12	Italy (ITA-2)	Pasquale Gesuito; Antonio Tartaglia	61.02	61.07	61.52	61.33	4:04.94
13	Great Britain (GBR-2)	Nick Phipps; George Farrell	60.49	61.43	61.69	61.78	4:05.39
14	France (FRA-1)	Christophe Flacher; Claude Dasse	61.13	61.52	61.47	61.44	4:05.56
15	Latvia (LAT-2)	Sandis Prūsis; Adris Plūksna	60.92	61.40	61.56	61.74	4:05.62
16	Latvia (LAT-1)	Zintis Ekmanis; Aldis Intlers	60.94	61.57	61.88	61.94	4:06.33
17	France (FRA-2)	Gabriel Fourmigué; Philippe Tanchon	61.19	61.72	61.77	61.70	4:06.38
18	Romania (ROU-1)	Csaba Nagy Lakatos; Laurențiu Budur	61.34	61.58	62.06	61.70	4:06.68
19	Japan (JPN-2)	Toshio Wakita; Ryoji Yamazaki	61.22	61.65	62.03	61.96	4:06.86
20	Unified Team (EUN-1)	Vladimir Yefimov; Aleksey Golovin	61.17	61.85	62.03	62.25	4:07.30
21	Japan (JPN-1)	Naomi Takewaki; Fuminori Tsushima	61.74	61.99	61.77	61.95	4:07.45
22	Romania (ROU-2)	Paul Neagu; Costel Petrariu	61.44	61.81	62.19	62.40	4:07.84
23	Monaco (MON-1)	Gilbert Bessi; Michel Vatrican	61.55	62.09	62.08	62.41	4:08.13
24	United States (USA-2)	Brian Richardson; Greg Harrell	61.56	62.15	62.26	62.20	4:08.17
25	Czechoslovakia (TCH-1)	Jiří Dzmura; Roman Hrabaň	61.37	62.33	62.25	62.36	4:08.31
26	Unified Team (EUN-2)	Oleg Sukhoruchenko; Andrey Gorokhov	61.77	62.06	62.19	62.31	4:08.33
27	Norway	Erik Gogstad; Atle Norstad	61.64	62.24	62.24	62.36	4:08.48
28	Bulgaria (BUL-1)	Tsvetozar Viktorov; Valentin Atanasov	62.35	62.11	62.20	62.11	4:08.77
29	Yugoslavia (YUG-1)	Borislav Vujadinović; Miro Pandurević	62.22	62.43	62.73	62.73	4:10.11
30	Australia	Glenn Turner; Paul Narracott	62.17	62.61	62.81	62.66	4:10.25
31	Czechoslovakia (TCH-2)	Petr Ramseidl; Zdeněk Kohout	62.46	62.48	63.10	62.80	4:10.84
32	Ireland (IRL-1)	Pat McDonagh; Terry McHugh	62.39	63.03	62.44	63.07	4:10.93
33	Chinese Taipei	Chen Chin-san; Chang Min-jung	62.27	62.83	62.91	62.96	4:10.97
34	Yugoslavia (YUG-2)	Dragiša Jovanović; Ognjen Sokolović	62.67	62.97	62.94	62.81	4:11.39
35	Jamaica (JAM-2)	Devon Harris; Ricky McIntosh	62.57	62.88	63.13	63.10	4:11.68
36	Jamaica (JAM-1)	Dudley Stokes; Chris Stokes	62.93	63.30	63.38	63.15	4:12.76
37	Netherlands Antilles	Bart Carpentier Alting; Dudley den Dulk	62.97	63.26	63.40	63.46	4:13.09
38	Ireland (IRL-2)	Gerry Macken; Malachy Sheridan	63.19	63.42	63.45	63.42	4:13.48
39	Bulgaria (BUL-2)	Nikolay Dimitrov; Dimitar Dimitrov	62.89	63.59	63.71	63.43	4:13.62
40	Puerto Rico (PUR-1)	Liston Bochette; Douglas Rosado	63.09	63.64	63.86	63.48	4:14.07
41	Mexico (MEX-1)	Roberto Tamés; Miguel Elizondo	63.46	63.88	63.42	63.46	4:14.22
42	Mexico (MEX-2)	Jorge Tamés; Carlos Casar	63.42	63.77	63.66	63.78	4:14.63
43	Monaco (MON-2)	Albert, Prince Grimaldi; Pascal Camia	63.57	63.88	63.93	64.04	4:15.42
44	Virgin Islands (ISV-1)	Sven Petersen; Bill Neill	63.95	64.21	64.32	64.12	4:16.60
45	Virgin Islands (ISV-2)	Daniel Burgner; David Entwistle	64.21	64.10	64.12	64.29	4:16.72
46	Puerto Rico (PUR-2)	John Amabile; Jorge Bonnet	63.51	89.57	64.51	64.02	4:41.61
