= Biathlon at the 1992 Winter Olympics – Women's sprint =

Women's biathlon sprint at the XVI Olympic Winter Games
- Venue: Les Saisies
- Dates: February 11, 1992
- Competitors: 69 from 20 nations
- Winning time: 24:29.2

Medalists
1st place, gold medalist(s)		Anfisa Reztsova	Unified Team
2nd place, silver medalist(s)		Antje Misersky	Germany
3rd place, bronze medalist(s)		Yelena Belova	Unified Team

The Women's 7.5 kilometre sprint biathlon competition at the 1992 Winter Olympics was held on 11 February, at Les Saisies. Competitors raced over two 2.5 kilometre loops and one 3.0 kilometre loop of the skiing course, shooting two times, once prone and once standing. Each miss was penalized by requiring the competitor to race over a 150-metre penalty loop.

== Results ==
Rank	Bib	Name	Country	Time	Penalties (P+S)	Deficit
1st place, gold medalist(s)	36	Anfisa Reztsova	Unified Team	24:29.2	3 (0+3)	–
2nd place, silver medalist(s)	31	Antje Misersky	Germany	24:45.1	2 (0+2)	+15.9
3rd place, bronze medalist(s)	6	Yelena Belova	Unified Team	24:50.8	2 (2+0)	+21.6
4	46	Nadezhda Aleksieva	Bulgaria	24:55.8	0 (0+0)	+26.6
5	35	Jiřina Adamičková	Czechoslovakia	24:57.6	0 (0+0)	+28.4
6	53	Petra Schaaf	Germany	25:10.4	1 (0+1)	+41.2
7	50	Anne Briand	France	25:29.8	2 (0+2)	+1:00.6
8	4	Silvana Blagoeva	Bulgaria	25:33.5	2 (1+1)	+1:04.3
9	9	Delphyne Heymann-Burlet	France	25:50.5	4 (2+2)	+1:21.3
10	5	Inga Kesper	Germany	25:57.3	2 (2+0)	+1:28.1
11	55	Uschi Disl	Germany	25:58.9	2 (1+1)	+1:29.7
12	51	Myriam Bédard	Canada	26:04.6	1 (0+1)	+1:35.4
13	61	Svetlana Pechorskaya	Unified Team	26:09.7	0 (0+0)	+1:40.5
14	32	Mia Stadig	Sweden	26:15.0	0 (0+0)	+1:45.8
15	56	Elin Kristiansen	Norway	26:23.3	1 (0+1)	+1:54.1
16	52	Nathalie Santer	Italy	26:28.7	3 (1+2)	+1:59.5
17	17	Corinne Niogret	France	26:32.3	3 (1+2)	+2:03.1
18	63	Gabriela Suvová	Czechoslovakia	26:42.1	2 (0+2)	+2:12.9
19	15	Signe Trosten	Norway	26:43.3	2 (0+2)	+2:14.1
20	20	Yelena Golovina	Unified Team	26:50.3	1 (0+1)	+2:21.1
21	69	Joan Smith	United States	26:54.5	0 (0+0)	+2:25.3
22	44	Yoshiko Honda-Mikami	Japan	26:57.3	2 (0+2)	+2:28.1
23	67	Vera Vucheva	Bulgaria	27:01.0	1 (0+1)	+2:31.8
24	65	Véronique Claudel	France	27:04.5	4 (1+3)	+2:35.3
25	14	Mary Ostergren	United States	27:05.7	2 (0+2)	+2:36.5
26	42	Inger Björkbom	Sweden	27:13.1	1 (1+0)	+2:43.9
27	49	Kazimiera Strolienė	Lithuania	27:16.7	4 (3+1)	+2:47.5
28	7	Terhi Markkanen	Finland	27:20.7	2 (0+2)	+2:51.5
29	37	Song Aiqin	China	27:21.2	3 (1+2)	+2:52.0
30	48	Jelena Poljakova-Všivtseva	Estonia	27:22.8	1 (0+1)	+2:53.6
31	27	Grete Ingeborg Nykkelmo	Norway	27:24.2	5 (1+4)	+2:55.0
32	38	Anne Elvebakk	Norway	27:34.2	3 (1+2)	+3:05.0
33	33	Iva Karagiozova-Shkodreva	Bulgaria	27:42.6	5 (2+3)	+3:13.4
34	43	Mari Lampinen	Finland	27:46.1	3 (2+1)	+3:16.9
35	2	Wang Jinfen	China	27:53.2	2 (0+2)	+3:24.0
36	22	María Giro	Argentina	27:53.5	0 (0+0)	+3:24.3
37	62	Monika Schwingshackl	Italy	27:56.1	2 (0+2)	+3:26.9
38	24	Adina Țuțulan-Șotropa	Romania	27:57.0	3 (2+1)	+3:27.8
39	40	Kerryn Pethybridge-Rim	Australia	27:58.7	2 (1+1)	+3:29.5
40	41	Halina Pitoń	Poland	28:11.7	4 (2+2)	+3:42.5
41	1	Iveta Knížková	Czechoslovakia	28:13.0	8 (3+5)	+3:43.8
42	18	Krista Lepik	Estonia	28:18.6	4 (2+2)	+3:49.4
43	8	Anna Hermansson	Sweden	28:20.3	3 (0+3)	+3:51.1
44	25	Nancy Bell-Johnstone	United States	28:20.6	3 (1+2)	+3:51.4
45	23	Tuija Sikiö	Finland	28:21.4	2 (1+1)	+3:52.2
46	34	Agata Suszka	Poland	28:23.6	3 (0+3)	+3:54.4
47	59	Lise Meloche	Canada	28:24.7	2 (0+2)	+3:55.5
48	60	Ileana Ianoşiu-Hangan	Romania	28:32.1	5 (3+2)	+4:02.9
49	12	Erica Carrara	Italy	28:38.5	4 (1+3)	+4:09.3
50	21	Jane Isakson	Canada	28:39.7	1 (1+0)	+4:10.5
50	58	Zofia Kiełpińska	Poland	28:39.7	4 (2+2)	+4:10.5
52	57	Wang Jinping	China	28:42.4	1 (0+1)	+4:13.2
53	68	Johanna Saarinen	Finland	28:48.6	4 (2+2)	+4:19.4
54	26	Sandra Paintin	Australia	28:50.0	2 (1+1)	+4:20.8
55	3	Mihaela Cârstoi	Romania	29:10.5	3 (3+0)	+4:41.3
56	29	Siegrid Pallhuber	Italy	29:23.1	5 (3+2)	+4:53.9
57	64	Christina Eklund	Sweden	29:25.9	4 (2+2)	+4:56.7
58	54	Eveli Peterson	Estonia	29:31.4	5 (1+4)	+5:02.2
59	10	Yvonne Visser	Canada	29:35.9	4 (1+3)	+5:06.7
60	11	Krystyna Liberda	Poland	29:39.9	7 (5+2)	+5:10.7
61	30	Brigitta Bereczki	Hungary	29:42.6	6 (3+3)	+5:13.4
62	28	Helena Černohorská	Czechoslovakia	30:13.8	3 (1+2)	+5:44.6
63	39	Monica Jauca	Romania	31:13.7	5 (0+5)	+6:44.5
64	47	Joan Guetschow	United States	31:30.6	3 (1+2)	+7:01.4
65	13	Kathalin Czifra	Hungary	32:04.4	3 (2+1)	+7:35.2
66	45	Beatrix Holéczy	Hungary	32:44.5	2 (1+1)	+8:15.3
67	66	Anna Bozsik	Hungary	33:44.8	4 (3+1)	+9:15.6
68	16	Fabiana Lovece	Argentina	39:07.0	9 (4+5)	+14:37.8
-	19	Liu Guilan	China	DNF	-	-
