= Romania at the 1992 Winter Olympics =

- IOC code: ROU (ROM used at these Games)
- NOC: Romanian Olympic and Sports Committee
- Website: www.cosr.ro (in Romanian, English, and French)

in Albertville
- Competitors: 23 (14 men, 9 women) in 8 sports
- Flag bearer: Ioan Apostol (luge)
- Medals: Gold 0 Silver 0 Bronze 0 Total 0

Winter Olympics appearances (overview)
- 1928; 1932; 1936; 1948; 1952; 1956; 1960; 1964; 1968; 1972; 1976; 1980; 1984; 1988; 1992; 1994; 1998; 2002; 2006; 2010; 2014; 2018; 2022; 2026

Romania was represented at the 1992 Winter Olympics in Albertville, France by the Romanian Olympic and Sports Committee.

In total, 23 athletes including 14 men and nine women represented Romania in eight different sports including alpine skiing, biathlon, bobsleigh, cross-country skiing, figure skating, luge, ski jumping and speed skating.

== Competitors ==
In total, 23 athletes represented Romania at the 1992 Winter Olympics in Albertville, France across eight different sports.

Sport	Men	Women	Total
Alpine skiing	2	1	3
Biathlon	1	5	6
Bobsleigh	5	–	5
Cross-country skiing	1	1	2
Figure skating	1	0	1
Luge	2	1	3
Ski jumping	1	–	1
Speed skating	1	2	3
Total	14	9	23

== Alpine skiing ==
In total, three Romanian athletes participated in the alpine skiing events – Mihaela Fera, Emilian Focşeneanu and Aurel Foiciuc.

Men

Athlete	Event	Race 1	Race 2	Total	
Athlete	Event	Time	Time	Time	Rank
Aurel Foiciuc	Downhill			2:09.94	44
Emilian Focşeneanu	Downhill			2:08.81	42
Emilian Focşeneanu	Super-G			DNF	–
Aurel Fiociuc	Super-G			1:24.62	68
Aurel Foiciuc	Giant Slalom	1:16.03	1:14.79	2:30.82	53
Emilian Focşeneanu	Giant Slalom	1:15.48	1:13.52	2:29.00	48
Emilian Focşeneanu	Slalom	DNF	–	DNF	–
Aurel Foiciuc	Slalom	1:02.57	1:01.77	2:04.34	41

Men's combined

Athlete	Downhill	Slalom		Total	
Athlete	Time	Time 1	Time 2	Points	Rank
Emilian Focşeneanu	1:59.94	58.16	1:00.04	249.41	35
Aurel Foiciuc	1:57.91	DSQ	–	DSQ	–

Women

Athlete	Event	Race 1	Race 2	Total	
Athlete	Event	Time	Time	Time	Rank
Mihaela Fera	Downhill			2:01.27	28
Mihaela Fera	Super-G			1:31.78	38
Mihaela Fera	Giant Slalom	1:13.91	1:14.67	2:28.58	28
Mihaela Fera	Slalom	54.15	50.70	1:44.85	29

Women's combined

Athlete	Downhill	Slalom		Total	
Athlete	Time	Time 1	Time 2	Points	Rank
Mihaela Fera	1:31.74	38.00	DNF	DNF	–

== Biathlon ==
In total, six Romanian athletes participated in the biathlon events – Mihaela Cârstoi, Daniela Gârbacea, Ileana Ianoşiu-Hangan, Monica Jauca, Nicolae Şerban and Adina Țuțulan-Șotropa.

Men

Event	Athlete	Misses ^{1}	Time	Rank
10 km Sprint	Nicolae Şerban	4	31:29.6	81

Event	Athlete	Time	Misses	Adjusted time ^{2}	Rank
20 km	Nicolae Şerban	1'01:33.3	5	1'06:33.3	71

Women

Event	Athlete	Misses ^{1}	Time	Rank
7.5 km Sprint	Monica Jauca	5	31:13.7	63
7.5 km Sprint	Mihaela Cârstoi	3	29:10.5	55
7.5 km Sprint	Ileana Ianoşiu-Hangan	5	28:32.1	48
7.5 km Sprint	Adina Țuțulan-Șotropa	3	27:57.0	38

Event	Athlete	Time	Misses	Adjusted time ^{2}	Rank
15 km	Daniela Gârbacea	DSQ	–	DSQ	–
15 km	Mihaela Cârstoi	52:29.2	8	1'00:29.2	51
15 km	Monica Jauca	54:44.2	5	59:44.2	48
15 km	Adina Țuțulan-Șotropa	51:58.6	7	58:58.6	41

Women's 3 × 7.5 km relay

Athletes	Race		
Athletes	Misses ^{1}	Time	Rank
Adina Țuțulan-Șotropa; Mihaela Cârstoi; Ileana Ianoşiu-Hangan	0	1'23:39.6	10

^{1} A penalty loop of 150 metres had to be skied per missed target.
^{2} One minute added per missed target.

== Bobsleigh ==
In total, five Romanian athletes participated in the bobsleigh events – Laurențiu Budur, László Hodos, Csaba Nagy Lakatos, Paul Neagu and Costel Petrariu.

Sled	Athletes	Event	Run 1		Run 2		Run 3		Run 4		Total	
Sled	Athletes	Event	Time	Rank	Time	Rank	Time	Rank	Time	Rank	Time	Rank
ROU-1	Csaba Nagy Lakatos; Laurențiu Budur	Two-man	1:01.34	20	1:01.58	17	1:02.06	21	1:01.70	14	4:06.68	18
ROU-2	Paul Neagu; Costel Petrariu	Two-man	1:01.44	22	1:01.81	20	1:02.19	23	1:02.40	27	4:07.84	22

Sled	Athletes	Event	Run 1		Run 2		Run 3		Run 4		Total	
Sled	Athletes	Event	Time	Rank	Time	Rank	Time	Rank	Time	Rank	Time	Rank
ROU-1	Paul Neagu; László Hodos; Laurențiu Budur; Costel Petrariu	Four-man	59.04	18	59.52	20	59.50	19	59.38	17	3:57.44	20

== Cross-country skiing ==
In total, two Romanian athletes participated in the cross-country skiing events – Ileana Ianoşiu-Hangan and Viorel Şotropa.

Men

Event	Athlete	Race	
Event	Athlete	Time	Rank
10 km C	Viorel Şotropa	32:57.5	72
15 km pursuit^{1} F	Viorel Şotropa	45:56.4	54
30 km C	Viorel Şotropa	1'30:10.5	35
50 km F	Viorel Şotropa	2'16:03.5	36

^{1} Starting delay based on 10 km results.
C = Classical style, F = Freestyle

Women

Event	Athlete	Race	
Event	Athlete	Time	Rank
30 km F	Ileana Ianoşiu-Hangan	1'38:06.7	50

C = Classical style, F = Freestyle

== Figure skating ==
In total, one Romanian athlete participated in the figure skating events – Marius Negrea.

Men

Athlete	SP	FS	TFP	Rank
Marius Negrea	27	DNF	DNF	–

== Luge ==
In total, three Romanian athletes participated in the luge events – Ioan Apostol, Liviu Cepoi and Corina Drăgan-Terecoasa.

Men

Athlete	Run 1		Run 2		Run 3		Run 4		Total	
Athlete	Time	Rank	Time	Rank	Time	Rank	Time	Rank	Time	Rank
Ioan Apostol	46.728	25	46.913	25	47.516	26	47.626	26	3:08.783	26

(Men's) Doubles

Athletes	Run 1		Run 2		Total	
Athletes	Time	Rank	Time	Rank	Time	Rank
Ioan Apostol; Liviu Cepoi	46.315	4	46.334	4	1:32.649	4

Women

Athlete	Run 1		Run 2		Run 3		Run 4		Total	
Athlete	Time	Rank	Time	Rank	Time	Rank	Time	Rank	Time	Rank
Corina Drăgan-Terecoasa	48.386	22	48.315	23	48.358	22	48.067	22	3:13.126	22

== Ski jumping ==
In total, one Romanian athlete participated in the ski jumping events – Virgil Neagoe.

Athlete	Event	Jump 1		Jump 2		Total	
Athlete	Event	Distance	Points	Distance	Points	Points	Rank
Virgil Neagoe	Normal hill	73.5	72.6	72.0	71.2	143.8	57
Virgil Neagoe	Large hill	76.0	29.4	78.0	34.7	64.1	58

== Speed skating ==
In total, three Romanian athletes participated in the speed skating events – Zsolt Baló, Mihaela Dascălu and Cerasela Hordobețiu.

Men

Event	Athlete	Race	
Event	Athlete	Time	Rank
500 m	Zsolt Baló	39.70	36
1000 m	Zsolt Baló	1:18.12	36
1500 m	Zsolt Baló	2:01.33	33
5000 m	Zsolt Baló	7:32.89	33

Women

Event	Athlete	Race	
Event	Athlete	Time	Rank
500 m	Cerasela Hordobețiu	42.68	30
500 m	Mihaela Dascălu	41.90	21
1000 m	Cerasela Hordobețiu	DNF	–
1000 m	Mihaela Dascălu	1:22.85	6
1500 m	Cerasela Hordobețiu	2:14.69	28
1500 m	Mihaela Dascălu	2:09.87	17
3000 m	Mihaela Dascălu	4:38.39	19
3000 m	Cerasela Hordobețiu	4:38.08	18
5000 m	Cerasela Hordobețiu	8:07.16	19
5000 m	Mihaela Dascălu	7:54.03	13
