= Biathlon at the 1992 Winter Olympics – Women's individual =

Women's biathlon individual at the XVI Olympic Winter Games
- Pictogram for biathlon
- Venue: Les Saisies
- Dates: 19 February 1992
- Competitors: 68 from 20 nations
- Winning time: 51:47.2

Medalists
1st place, gold medalist(s)		Antje Misersky	Germany
2nd place, silver medalist(s)		Svetlana Pechorskaya	Unified Team
3rd place, bronze medalist(s)		Myriam Bédard	Canada

The Women's 15 kilometre individual biathlon competition at the 1992 Winter Olympics was held on 19 February, at Les Saisies. Each miss resulted in one minute being added to a competitor's skiing time.

== Results ==
These are the results of the event:

Rank	Bib	Name	Country	Ski Time	Penalties (P+S+P+S)	Result	Deficit
1st place, gold medalist(s)	16	Antje Misersky	Germany	50:47.2	1 (0+0+0+1)	51:47.2	–
2nd place, silver medalist(s)	67	Svetlana Pechorskaya	Unified Team	50:58.5	1 (0+1+0+0)	51:58.5	+11.3
3rd place, bronze medalist(s)	32	Myriam Bédard	Canada	50:15.0	2 (0+1+1+0)	52:15.0	+27.8
4	20	Véronique Claudel	France	50:21.2	2 (0+1+0+1)	52:21.2	+34.0
5	53	Nadezhda Aleksieva	Bulgaria	51:30.2	1 (0+0+0+1)	52:30.2	+43.0
6	61	Delphyne Burlet	France	50:00.8	3 (1+0+0+2)	53:00.8	+1:13.6
7	2	Corinne Niogret	France	51:06.6	2 (1+0+0+1)	53:06.6	+1:19.4
8	52	Nathalie Santer	Italy	50:10.3	3 (1+1+0+1)	53:10.3	+1:23.1
9	66	Elin Kristiansen	Norway	51:19.6	2 (1+0+1+0)	53:19.6	+1:32.4
10	1	Signe Trosten	Norway	51:24.5	2 (0+1+0+1)	53:24.5	+1:37.3
11	6	Krista Lepik	Estonia	52:51.4	1 (0+1+0+0)	53:51.4	+2:04.2
12	35	Inger Björkbom	Sweden	52:52.8	1 (0+0+0+1)	53:52.8	+2:05.6
13	19	Petra Schaaf	Germany	50:56.3	3 (1+0+1+1)	53:56.3	+2:09.1
14	58	Tuija Sikiö	Finland	53:03.0	1 (0+0+0+1)	54:03.0	+2:15.8
15	62	Inga Kesper	Germany	51:42.3	3 (1+2+0+0)	54:42.3	+2:55.1
16	54	Mariya Manolova	Bulgaria	52:10.6	3 (0+0+1+2)	55:10.6	+3:23.4
17	28	Iva Schkodreva	Bulgaria	51:22.4	4 (1+0+1+2)	55:22.4	+3:35.2
18	27	Grete Ingeborg Nykkelmo	Norway	50:59.4	5 (0+2+1+2)	55:59.4	+4:12.2
19	47	Anne Briand	France	49:05.1	7 (2+2+0+3)	56:05.1	+4:17.9
20	21	Halina Pitoń	Poland	52:07.2	4 (2+1+1+0)	56:07.2	+4:20.0
21	13	Svetlana Paramygina	Unified Team	52:15.2	4 (1+2+0+1)	56:15.2	+4:28.0
22	51	Yelena Golovina	Unified Team	54:17.9	2 (1+1+0+0)	56:17.9	+4:30.7
23	48	Jiřina Adamičková	Czechoslovakia	53:21.8	3 (1+1+0+1)	56:21.8	+4:34.6
24	49	Uschi Disl	Germany	50:40.2	6 (1+3+2+0)	56:40.2	+4:53.0
25	15	Silvana Blagoeva	Bulgaria	51:42.3	5 (0+2+2+1)	56:42.3	+4:55.1
26	23	Anfisa Reztsova	Unified Team	47:52.6	9 (0+3+2+4)	56:52.6	+5:05.4
27	41	Åse Idland	Norway	53:05.0	4 (1+1+1+1)	57:05.0	+5:17.8
28	42	Kazimiera Strolienė	Lithuania	51:20.0	6 (3+1+1+1)	57:20.0	+5:32.8
29	11	Catarina Eklund	Sweden	55:31.2	2 (1+0+0+1)	57:31.2	+5:44.0
30	37	Song Aiqin	China	52:31.3	5 (2+1+1+1)	57:31.3	+5:44.1
31	8	Mari Lampinen	Finland	51:44.8	6 (1+2+1+2)	57:44.8	+5:57.6
32	45	Kerryn Pethybridge-Rim	Australia	55:49.7	2 (0+0+1+1)	57:49.7	+6:02.5
33	30	Mia Stadig	Sweden	54:54.5	3 (1+0+0+2)	57:54.5	+6:07.3
34	34	Nancy Bell-Johnstone	United States	52:55.2	5 (0+2+0+3)	57:55.2	+6:08.0
35	39	Yoshiko Honda-Mikami	Japan	54:55.8	3 (1+1+0+1)	57:55.8	+6:08.6
36	50	Eveli Peterson	Estonia	53:03.1	5 (1+1+1+2)	58:03.1	+6:15.9
37	22	Terhi Markkanen	Finland	54:08.9	4 (1+2+0+1)	58:08.9	+6:21.7
38	12	Siegrid Pallhuber	Italy	54:27.3	4 (1+1+1+1)	58:27.3	+6:40.1
39	31	Jelena Poljakova-Všivtseva	Estonia	53:30.1	5 (1+1+3+0)	58:30.1	+6:42.9
40	29	Sandra Paintin	Australia	55:55.3	3 (2+0+0+1)	58:55.3	+7:08.1
41	40	Adina Țuțulan-Șotropa	Romania	51:58.6	7 (4+2+1+0)	58:58.6	+7:11.4
42	5	Patrice Anderson	United States	56:59.6	2 (1+1+0+0)	58:59.6	+7:12.4
43	33	Jana Kulhavá	Czechoslovakia	53:09.8	6 (0+2+1+3)	59:09.8	+7:22.6
44	17	Brigitta Bereczki	Hungary	54:18.2	5 (0+1+1+3)	59:18.2	+7:31.0
45	46	Johanna Saarinen	Finland	56:27.0	3 (0+3+0+0)	59:27.0	+7:39.8
46	38	Agata Suszka	Poland	53:30.2	6 (0+2+1+3)	59:30.2	+7:43.0
47	63	Beth Coats	United States	57:36.1	2 (0+0+1+1)	59:36.1	+7:48.9
48	68	Monica Jauca	Romania	54:44.2	5 (2+1+0+2)	59:44.2	+7:57.0
49	14	Liu Guilan	China	54:55.4	5 (2+1+0+2)	59:55.4	+8:08.2
50	55	Lise Meloche	Canada	55:10.4	5 (1+3+0+1)	1:00:10.4	+8:23.2
51	25	Mihaela Cârstoi	Romania	52:29.2	8 (1+3+1+3)	1:00:29.2	+8:42.0
52	36	Yvonne Visser	Canada	55:38.2	5 (1+0+2+2)	1:00:38.2	+8:51.0
53	56	Erica Carrara	Italy	56:58.8	4 (0+2+1+1)	1:00:58.8	+9:11.6
54	7	Jane Isakson	Canada	57:06.5	4 (2+0+1+1)	1:01:06.5	+9:19.3
55	43	Joan Smith	United States	56:15.2	5 (1+2+0+2)	1:01:15.2	+9:28.0
56	60	Gabriela Suvová	Czechoslovakia	55:22.4	7 (0+1+3+3)	1:02:22.4	+10:35.2
57	24	Monika Schwingshackl	Italy	54:39.5	8 (1+4+0+3)	1:02:39.5	+10:52.3
58	44	Beatrix Holéczy	Hungary	58:56.4	4 (0+2+0+2)	1:02:56.4	+11:09.2
59	3	Krystyna Liberda	Poland	54:57.2	8 (3+3+1+1)	1:02:57.2	+11:10.0
60	10	Petra Nosková	Czechoslovakia	55:57.6	7 (0+1+2+4)	1:02:57.6	+11:10.4
61	64	Wang Jinping	China	56:01.1	7 (1+2+2+2)	1:03:01.1	+11:13.9
62	57	Zofia Kiełpińska	Poland	52:15.1	11 (4+4+1+2)	1:03:15.1	+11:27.9
63	26	María Giro	Argentina	57:18.0	6 (0+3+0+3)	1:03:18.0	+11:30.8
64	59	Anna Hermansson	Sweden	54:49.0	9 (1+2+4+2)	1:03:49.0	+12:01.8
65	18	Wang Jinfen	China	53:53.0	10 (3+2+2+3)	1:03:53.0	+12:05.8
66	65	Anna Bozsik	Hungary	55:47.0	10 (2+3+2+3)	1:05:47.0	+13:59.8
-	9	Kathalin Czifra	Hungary	DNF	-	DNF	-
-	4	Daniela Gârbacea	Romania	DQ	-	DQ	-
