= Romania at the 1994 Winter Olympics =

- IOC code: ROU (ROM used at these Games)
- NOC: Romanian Olympic and Sports Committee
- Website: www.cosr.ro (in Romanian, English, and French)

in Lillehammer
- Competitors: 23 (13 men, 10 women) in 7 sports
- Flag bearer: Ioan Apostol (luge)
- Medals: Gold 0 Silver 0 Bronze 0 Total 0

Winter Olympics appearances (overview)
- 1928; 1932; 1936; 1948; 1952; 1956; 1960; 1964; 1968; 1972; 1976; 1980; 1984; 1988; 1992; 1994; 1998; 2002; 2006; 2010; 2014; 2018; 2022; 2026

Romania competed at the 1994 Winter Olympics in Lillehammer, Norway.

== Competitors ==
The following is the list of number of competitors in the Games.

Sport	Men	Women	Total
Alpine skiing	0	2	2
Biathlon	1	4	5
Bobsleigh	4	–	4
Cross-country skiing	2	0	2
Figure skating	2	0	2
Luge	2	2	4
Speed skating	2	2	4
Total	13	10	23

== Alpine skiing ==
Women

Athlete	Event	Race 1	Race 2	Total	
Athlete	Event	Time	Time	Time	Rank
Maria Zaruc	Downhill			1:45.73	40
Mihaela Fera	Downhill			1:41.07	36
Mihaela Fera	Super-G			1:28.47	39

Women's combined

Athlete	Downhill	Slalom		Total	
Athlete	Time	Time 1	Time 2	Total time	Rank
Maria Zaruc	DNF	–	DNF	DNF	–
Mihaela Fera	1:31.69	59.19	55.22	3:26.10	20

== Biathlon ==
Men

Event	Athlete	Misses ^{1}	Time	Rank
10 km Sprint	Gheorghe Vasile	2	31:05.3	34

Event	Athlete	Time	Misses	Adjusted time ^{2}	Rank
20 km	Gheorghe Vasile	58:33.7	2	1'00:33.7	21

Women

Event	Athlete	Misses ^{1}	Time	Rank
7.5 km Sprint	Adina Țuțulan-Șotropa	3	29:34.8	55
7.5 km Sprint	Ileana Ianoşiu-Hangan	2	28:37.1	43

Event	Athlete	Time	Misses	Adjusted time ^{2}	Rank
15 km	Mihaela Cârstoi	54:15.0	7	1'01:15.0	63
15 km	Adina Țuțulan-Șotropa	54:27.4	1	55:27.4	18

Women's 4 × 7.5 km relay

Athletes	Race		
Athletes	Misses ^{1}	Time	Rank
Adina Țuțulan-Șotropa; Mihaela Cârstoi; Ana Roman; Ileana Ianoşiu-Hangan	4	2'02:36.8	16

^{1} A penalty loop of 150 metres had to be skied per missed target.
^{2} One minute added per missed target.

== Bobsleigh ==
Sled	Athletes	Event	Run 1		Run 2		Run 3		Run 4		Total	
Sled	Athletes	Event	Time	Rank	Time	Rank	Time	Rank	Time	Rank	Time	Rank
ROU-1	Florian Enache; Mihai Dumitrașcu	Two-man	54.35	32	54.38	31	54.47	31	54.85	34	3:38.05	30

Sled	Athletes	Event	Run 1		Run 2		Run 3		Run 4		Total	
Sled	Athletes	Event	Time	Rank	Time	Rank	Time	Rank	Time	Rank	Time	Rank
ROU-1	Florian Enache; Marian Chițescu; Iulian Păcioianu; Mihai Dumitrașcu	Four-man	52.92	24	53.02	24	53.19	23	53.05	21	3:32.18	23

== Cross-country skiing ==
Men

Event	Athlete	Race	
Event	Athlete	Time	Rank
10 km C	Zsolt Antal	29:13.3	80
10 km C	Elemer-György Tanko	28:30.5	73
15 km pursuit^{1} F	Zsolt Antal	44:44.2	62
15 km pursuit^{1} F	Elemer-György Tanko	44:27.1	59
30 km F	Zsolt Antal	1'23:49.7	54
30 km F	Elemer-György Tanko	1'23:22.6	52
50 km C	Elemer-György Tanko	DNF	–

^{1} Starting delay based on 10 km results.
C = Classical style, F = Freestyle

== Figure skating ==
Men

Athlete	SP	FS	TFP	Rank
Marius Negrea	19	19	28.5	19
Cornel Gheorghe	16	14	22.0	14

== Luge ==
(Men's) Doubles

Athletes	Run 1		Run 2		Total	
Athletes	Time	Rank	Time	Rank	Time	Rank
Ioan Apostol; Liviu Cepoi	48.647	6	48.676	5	1:37.323	6

Women

Athlete	Run 1		Run 2		Run 3		Run 4		Total	
Athlete	Time	Rank	Time	Rank	Time	Rank	Time	Rank	Time	Rank
Sorina Grigore	51.324	23	50.800	22	50.572	23	50.508	22	3:23.204	22
Adriana Turea	50.324	20	50.588	21	50.393	22	50.556	23	3:21.861	21

== Speed skating ==
Men

Event	Athlete	Race	
Event	Athlete	Time	Rank
500 m	Zsolt Baló	38.56	38
1000 m	Zsolt Baló	1:16.16	36
1500 m	Dezideriu Horvath	1:57.07	31
1500 m	Zsolt Baló	1:56.44	26
5000 m	Dezideriu Horvath	6:59.04	20

Women

Event	Athlete	Race	
Event	Athlete	Time	Rank
500 m	Cerasela Hordobețiu	42.15	29
500 m	Mihaela Dascălu	41.13	23
1000 m	Cerasela Hordobețiu	1:23.19	28
1000 m	Mihaela Dascălu	1:21.94	17
1500 m	Cerasela Hordobețiu	2:08.50	23
1500 m	Mihaela Dascălu	2:04.02	8
3000 m	Cerasela Hordobețiu	4:29.31	17
3000 m	Mihaela Dascălu	4:22.42	8
5000 m	Cerasela Hordobețiu	7:41.65	14

== Sources ==
- Official Olympic Reports
- Olympic Winter Games 1994, full results by sports-reference.com
