= Bulgaria at the 1994 Winter Olympics =

- IOC code: BUL
- NOC: Bulgarian Olympic Committee
- Website: www.bgolympic.org (in Bulgarian and English)

in Lillehammer
- Competitors: 17 (10 men and 7 women) in 7 sports
- Flag bearer: Nadezhda Aleksieva
- Medals: Gold 0 Silver 0 Bronze 0 Total 0

Winter Olympics appearances (overview)
- 1936; 1948; 1952; 1956; 1960; 1964; 1968; 1972; 1976; 1980; 1984; 1988; 1992; 1994; 1998; 2002; 2006; 2010; 2014; 2018; 2022; 2026; 2030

Bulgaria competed at the 1994 Winter Olympics in Lillehammer, Norway.

== Competitors ==
The following is the list of number of competitors in the Games.

Sport	Men	Women	Total
Alpine skiing	2	0	2
Biathlon	1	4	5
Bobsleigh	2	–	2
Cross-country skiing	3	1	4
Figure skating	0	1	1
Luge	2	0	2
Short track speed skating	0	1	1
Total	10	7	17

== Alpine skiing ==
Men

Athlete	Event	Final				
Athlete	Event	Run 1	Run 2	Run 3	Total	Rank
Petar Dichev	Downhill				1:51.07	44
Petar Dichev	Slalom	DNF			DNF	
Petar Dichev	Combined	1:42.41	54.97	51.23	3:28.61	26
Lyubomir Popov	Super-G				1:37.01	35
Lyubomir Popov	Giant Slalom	DNF			DNF	
Lyubomir Popov	Slalom	DNF			DNF	
Lyubomir Popov	Combined	1:42.41	52.40	50.23	3:25.04	19

== Biathlon ==
Men

Athlete	Event	Final		
Athlete	Event	Time	Pen.	Rank
Krasimir Videnov	10 km Sprint	30:59.3	1	31
Krasimir Videnov	20 km Individual	1:05:21.4	6	60

Women

Athlete	Event	Final		
Athlete	Event	Time	Pen.	Rank
Nadezhda Aleksieva	15 km Individual	59:15.0	3	47
Ekaterina Dafovska	7.5 km Sprint	27:54.4	1	29
Iva Karagiozova	7.5 km Sprint	27:00.6	0	11
Iva Karagiozova	15 km Individual	58:48.2	4	41
Mariya Manolova	7.5 km Sprint	29:26.7	2	52
Mariya Manolova	15 km Individual	55:58.2	2	22
Mariya Manolova; Nadezhda Aleksieva; Ekaterina Dafovska; Iva Karagiozova	4 × 7.5 km Relay	2:00:16.2	3	13

== Bobsleigh ==
Athlete	Event	Final					
Athlete	Event	Run 1	Run 2	Run 3	Run 4	Total	Rank
Tsvetozar Viktorov; Valentin Atanasov	Two-man bob	53.79	53.85	54.20	53.97	3:35.81	25

== Cross-country skiing ==
Men

Athlete	Event	Final					
Athlete	Event	Start	Rank	Time	Rank	Total	Rank
Slavcho Batinkov	10 km Classical					28:02.2	69
Slavcho Batinkov	15 km Free Pursuit	+03:42	69	40:45.5	59	+8:38.7	60
Slavcho Batinkov	30 km Free					1:24:19.4	58
Iskren Plankov	10 km Classical					28:39.0	74
Iskren Plankov	15 km Free Pursuit	+04:19	74	42:13.5	68	+10:43.7	67
Petar Zografov	10 km Classical					29:49.4	81
Petar Zografov	15 km Free Pursuit	+05:29	81	41:53.2	66	+11:33.4	70
Petar Zografov	30 km Free					1:27:18.6	64

Women

Athlete	Event	Final					
Athlete	Event	Start	Rank	Time	Rank	Total	Rank
Irina Nikulchina	5 km Classical					16:41.6	57
Irina Nikulchina	10 km Free Pursuit	+02:33	57	31:05.6	38	+6:08.5	43
Irina Nikulchina	15 km Free					47:03.5	44
Irina Nikulchina	30 km Classical					1:36:06.3	38

== Figure skating ==
Women

Athlete	Final				
Athlete	Short Program	Rank	Free Skating	Total	Rank
Tsvetelina Abrasheva	11.0	22	24.0	35.0	24

== Luge ==
Men

Athlete	Event	Final					
Athlete	Event	Run 1	Run 2	Run 3	Run 4	Total	Rank
Ilko Karacholov; Ivan Karacholov	Doubles	50.936	50.827			1:41.763	19

== Short track speed skating ==
Women

Athlete	Event	Heats		Quarterfinals		Semifinals		Final	
Athlete	Event	Time	Rank	Time	Rank	Time	Rank	Time	Rank
Evgenia Radanova	500 metres	50.67	3rd	Ranking Round					23rd
Evgenia Radanova	1000 metres	1:45.67	3rd	Ranking Round					21st

== Sources ==
- Official Olympic Reports
