= Austria at the 1992 Winter Olympics =

- IOC code: AUT
- NOC: Austrian Olympic Committee
- Website: www.olympia.at (in German)

in Albertville
- Competitors: 58 (45 men, 13 women) in 9 sports
- Flag bearer: Anita Wachter (alpine skiing)
- Medals Ranked 4th: Gold 6 Silver 7 Bronze 8 Total 21

Winter Olympics appearances (overview)
- 1924; 1928; 1932; 1936; 1948; 1952; 1956; 1960; 1964; 1968; 1972; 1976; 1980; 1984; 1988; 1992; 1994; 1998; 2002; 2006; 2010; 2014; 2018; 2022; 2026

Austria competed at the 1992 Winter Olympics in Albertville, France.

== Competitors ==
The following is the list of number of competitors in the Games.

Sport	Men	Women	Total
Alpine skiing	11	9	20
Biathlon	5	0	5
Bobsleigh	8	–	8
Cross-country skiing	6	0	6
Figure skating	1	0	1
Luge	4	3	7
Nordic combined	4	–	4
Ski jumping	4	–	4
Speed skating	2	1	3
Total	45	13	58

== Medalists ==
Medal	Name	Sport	Event	Date
Gold	Patrick Ortlieb	Alpine skiing	Men's downhill	9 February
Gold	Ernst Vettori	Ski jumping	Normal hill individual	9 February
Gold	Doris Neuner	Luge	Women's singles	12 February
Gold	Petra Kronberger	Alpine skiing	Women's combined	13 February
Gold	Petra Kronberger	Alpine skiing	Women's slalom	20 February
Gold	Ingo Appelt; Harald Winkler; Gerhard Haidacher; Thomas Schroll	Bobsleigh	Four-man	22 February
Silver	Martin Höllwarth	Ski jumping	Normal hill individual	9 February
Silver	Markus Prock	Luge	Men's singles	10 February
Silver	Angelika Neuner	Luge	Women's singles	12 February
Silver	Anita Wachter	Alpine skiing	Women's combined	13 February
Silver	Heinz Kuttin; Ernst Vettori; Martin Höllwarth; Andreas Felder	Ski jumping	Large hill team	14 February
Silver	Martin Höllwarth	Ski jumping	Large hill individual	16 February
Silver	Anita Wachter	Alpine skiing	Women's giant slalom	19 February
Bronze	Günther Mader	Alpine skiing	Men's downhill	9 February
Bronze	Emese Hunyady	Speed skating	Women's 3000 metres	9 February
Bronze	Markus Schmidt	Luge	Men's singles	10 February
Bronze	Klaus Sulzenbacher	Nordic combined	Individual	12 February
Bronze	Veronika Stallmaier	Alpine skiing	Women's downhill	15 February
Bronze	Heinz Kuttin	Ski jumping	Large hill individual	16 February
Bronze	Klaus Ofner; Stefan Kreiner; Klaus Sulzenbacher	Nordic combined	Team	17 February
Bronze	Michael Tritscher	Alpine skiing	Men's slalom	22 February

== Alpine skiing ==
Men

Athlete	Event	Race 1	Race 2	Total	
Athlete	Event	Time	Time	Time	Rank
Leonhard Stock	Downhill			DNF	–
Helmut Höflehner	Downhill			1:53.10	17
Günther Mader	Downhill			1:50.47	3rd place, bronze medalist(s)
Patrick Ortlieb	Downhill			1:50.37	1st place, gold medalist(s)
Hubert Strolz	Super-G			1:16.36	24
Patrick Ortlieb	Super-G			1:15.66	18
Rainer Salzgeber	Super-G			1:15.31	15
Günther Mader	Super-G			1:14.08	7
Hubert Strolz	Giant Slalom	1:06.75	1:02.70	2:09.45	9
Christian Mayer	Giant Slalom	1:06.23	1:03.83	2:10.06	12
Rainer Salzgeber	Giant Slalom	1:05.72	1:03.11	2:08.83	7
Günther Mader	Giant Slalom	1:05.42	1:03.38	2:08.80	6
Bernhard Gstrein	Slalom	54.12	54.14	1:48.26	15
Hubert Strolz	Slalom	54.06	53.73	1:47.79	13
Thomas Stangassinger	Slalom	53.51	53.14	1:46.65	9
Michael Tritscher	Slalom	52.50	52.35	1:44.85	3rd place, bronze medalist(s)

Men's combined

Athlete	Downhill	Slalom		Total	
Athlete	Time	Time 1	Time 2	Points	Rank
Günther Mader	DNF	–	–	DNF	–
Rainer Salzgeber	1:47.59	DNF	–	DNF	–
Stephan Eberharter	1:46.85	DNF	–	DNF	–
Hubert Strolz	1:46.54	48.08	DSQ	DSQ	–

Women

Athlete	Event	Race 1	Race 2	Total	
Athlete	Event	Time	Time	Time	Rank
Barbara Sadleder	Downhill			1:53.81	7
Petra Kronberger	Downhill			1:52.73	5
Veronika Wallinger-Stallmaier	Downhill			1:52.64	3rd place, bronze medalist(s)
Barbara Sadleder	Super-G			1:24.91	15
Anita Wachter	Super-G			1:24.20	9
Ulrike Maier	Super-G			1:23.35	5
Petra Kronberger	Super-G			1:23.20	4
Petra Kronberger	Giant Slalom	DNF	–	DNF	–
Sylvia Eder	Giant Slalom	1:07.20	1:07.85	2:15.05	9
Anita Wachter	Giant Slalom	1:06.43	1:07.20	2:13.71	2nd place, silver medalist(s)
Ulrike Maier	Giant Slalom	1:06.16	1:07.61	2:13.77	4
Monika Maierhofer	Slalom	49.46	DNF	DNF	–
Karin Buder	Slalom	49.10	44.58	1:33.68	5
Claudia Strobl	Slalom	49.08	DNF	DNF	–
Petra Kronberger	Slalom	48.28	44.40	1:32.68	1st place, gold medalist(s)

Women's combined

Athlete	Downhill	Slalom		Total	
Athlete	Time	Time 1	Time 2	Points	Rank
Ulrike Maier	1:28.51	34.37	DNF	DNF	–
Anita Wachter	1:27.25	34.79	34.72	19.39	2nd place, silver medalist(s)
Petra Kronberger	1:25.84	35.36	34.24	2.55	1st place, gold medalist(s)

== Biathlon ==
Men

Event	Athlete	Misses ^{1}	Time	Rank
10 km Sprint	Alfred Eder	2	28:44.8	53
10 km Sprint	Franz Schuler	1	27:34.3	21
10 km Sprint	Egon Leitner	2	27:31.8	19
10 km Sprint	Ludwig Gredler	2	27:14.8	11

Event	Athlete	Time	Misses	Adjusted time ^{2}	Rank
20 km	Franz Schuler	57:15.9	6	1'03:15.9	49
20 km	Egon Leitner	58:52.0	4	1'02:52.0	45
20 km	Bruno Hofstätter	59:36.1	3	1'02:36.1	41
20 km	Alfred Eder	1'00:03.0	1	1'01:03.0	30

Men's 4 x 7.5 km relay

Athletes	Race		
Athletes	Misses ^{1}	Time	Rank
Bruno Hofstätter; Egon Leitner; Ludwig Gredler; Franz Schuler	2	1'30:40.7	12

^{1} A penalty loop of 150 metres had to be skied per missed target.
^{2} One minute added per missed target.

== Bobsleigh ==
Sled	Athletes	Event	Run 1		Run 2		Run 3		Run 4		Total	
Sled	Athletes	Event	Time	Rank	Time	Rank	Time	Rank	Time	Rank	Time	Rank
AUT-1	Gerhard Rainer; Thomas Bachler	Two-man	1:00.33	4	1:01.20	9	1:01.18	6	1:01.29	7	4:04.00	8
AUT-2	Ingo Appelt; Thomas Schroll	Two-man	1:00.46	8	1:00.87	1	1:01.09	4	1:01.25	6	4:03.67	4

Sled	Athletes	Event	Run 1		Run 2		Run 3		Run 4		Total	
Sled	Athletes	Event	Time	Rank	Time	Rank	Time	Rank	Time	Rank	Time	Rank
AUT-1	Ingo Appelt; Harald Winkler; Gerhard Haidacher; Thomas Schroll	Four-man	57.74	1	58.85	10	58.52	1	58.79	3	3:53.90	1st place, gold medalist(s)
AUT-2	Gerhard Rainer; Thomas Bachler; Carsten Nentwig; Martin Schützenauer	Four-man	58.27	6	58.85	10	59.08	14	58.81	6	3:55.01	10

== Cross-country skiing ==
Men

Event	Athlete	Race	
Event	Athlete	Time	Rank
10 km C	Andreas Ringhofer	30:42.5	35
10 km C	Markus Gandler	30:35.9	34
10 km C	Alexander Marent	29:49.9	19
10 km C	Alois Stadlober	28:27.5	8
15 km pursuit^{1} F	Markus Gandler	42:31.8	28
15 km pursuit^{1} F	Alexander Marent	42:20.2	27
15 km pursuit^{1} F	Andreas Ringhofer	42:13.9	24
15 km pursuit^{1} F	Alois Stadlober	40:21.6	10
30 km C	Martin Standmann	1'30:27.7	39
30 km C	Alois Schwarz	1'29:01.6	29
30 km C	Alexander Marent	1'27:34.4	22
30 km C	Alois Stadlober	1'26:22.7	19
50 km F	Alexander Marent	DNF	–
50 km F	Martin Standmann	2'24:19.6	52
50 km F	Andreas Ringhofer	2'18:00.4	42
50 km F	Markus Gandler	2'17:21.8	41

^{1} Starting delay based on 10 km results.
C = Classical style, F = Freestyle

Men's 4 × 10 km relay

Athletes	Race	
Athletes	Time	Rank
Alois Schwarz; Alois Stadlober; Alexander Marent; Andreas Ringhofer	1'45:56.6	9

== Figure skating ==
Men

Athlete	SP	FS	TFP	Rank
Ralph Burghart	20	18	28.0	18

== Luge ==
Men

Athlete	Run 1		Run 2		Run 3		Run 4		Total	
Athlete	Time	Rank	Time	Rank	Time	Rank	Time	Rank	Time	Rank
Robert Manzenreiter	45.573	7	45.550	7	46.222	5	45.922	3	3:03.267	6
Markus Prock	45.356	3	45.330	2	46.075	3	45.908	2	3:02.669	2nd place, silver medalist(s)
Markus Schmidt	45.243	2	45.416	5	46.254	7	46.029	6	3:02.942	3rd place, bronze medalist(s)

(Men's) Doubles

Athletes	Run 1		Run 2		Total	
Athletes	Time	Rank	Time	Rank	Time	Rank
Gerhard Gleirscher; Markus Schmidt	46.514	6	46.743	8	1:33.257	7

Women

Athlete	Run 1		Run 2		Run 3		Run 4		Total	
Athlete	Time	Rank	Time	Rank	Time	Rank	Time	Rank	Time	Rank
Andrea Tagwerker	46.853	3	46.928	4	47.250	10	46.987	7	3:08.018	7
Angelika Neuner	46.805	2	46.724	1	46.577	1	46.663	2	3:06.769	2nd place, silver medalist(s)
Doris Neuner	46.590	1	46.764	2	46.637	3	46.705	3	3:06.696	1st place, gold medalist(s)

== Nordic combined ==
Men's individual

Events:

- normal hill ski jumping (Best two out of three jumps.)
- 15 km cross-country skiing (Start delay, based on ski jumping results.)

Athlete	Event	Ski Jumping		Cross-country		Total
Athlete	Event	Points	Rank	Start at	Time	Rank
Günther Csar	Individual	193.3	30	+3:54.7	51:28.7	32
Stefan Kreiner	Individual	214.8	7	+1:31.4	48:41.8	18
Klaus Sulzenbacher	Individual	221.6	4	+46.0	45:34.4	3rd place, bronze medalist(s)
Klaus Ofner	Individual	228.5	1	+0.0	45:57.9	5

Men's Team

Three participants per team.

Events:

- normal hill ski jumping (Best two out of three jumps per team member were counted.)
- 10 km cross-country skiing (Start delay, based on ski jumping results.)

Athletes	Ski jumping		Cross-country		Total
Athletes	Points	Rank	Start at	Time	Rank
Klaus Ofner; Stefan Kreiner; Klaus Sulzenbacher	615.6	2	+2:27.0	1'25:16.6	3rd place, bronze medalist(s)

== Ski jumping ==
Athlete	Event	Jump 1		Jump 2		Total	
Athlete	Event	Distance	Points	Distance	Points	Points	Rank
Heinz Kuttin	Normal hill	85.5	106.3	86.0	108.1	214.4	4
Andreas Felder	Normal hill	87.0	110.2	83.0	103.3	213.5	6
Ernst Vettori	Normal hill	88.0	111.8	87.5	111.0	222.8	1st place, gold medalist(s)
Martin Höllwarth	Normal hill	90.5	116.8	83.0	101.3	218.1	2nd place, silver medalist(s)
Ernst Vettori	Large hill	101.5	81.6	104.5	89.3	170.9	15
Andreas Felder	Large hill	105.0	89.5	103.5	87.4	176.9	9
Heinz Kuttin	Large hill	117.5	112.5	112.0	102.3	214.8	3rd place, bronze medalist(s)
Martin Höllwarth	Large hill	120.5	116.7	116.5	110.6	227.3	2nd place, silver medalist(s)

Men's team large hill

Athletes	Result	
Athletes	Points ^{1}	Rank
Martin Höllwarth; Heinz Kuttin; Andreas Felder; Ernst Vettori	642.9	2nd place, silver medalist(s)

^{1} Four teams members performed two jumps each. The best three were counted.

== Speed skating ==
Men

Event	Athlete	Race	
Event	Athlete	Time	Rank
500 m	Roland Brunner	42.18	40
1000 m	Michael Hadschieff	1:17.17	24
1000 m	Roland Brunner	1:16.76	22
1500 m	Roland Brunner	1:59.60	24
1500 m	Michael Hadschieff	1:57.43	14
5000 m	Michael Hadschieff	7:12.97	10
10,000 m	Michael Hadschieff	14:28.80	6

Women

Event	Athlete	Race	
Event	Athlete	Time	Rank
1000 m	Emese Nemeth-Hunyady	1:23.40	10
1500 m	Emese Nemeth-Hunyady	2:08.29	7
3000 m	Emese Nemeth-Hunyady	4:24.64	3rd place, bronze medalist(s)
5000 m	Emese Nemeth-Hunyady	7:56.48	15
