= Luge at the 1992 Winter Olympics – Women's singles =

International sporting competition

Women's singles at the XVI Olympic Winter Games
- Venue: La Plagne
- Dates: 11–12 February 1992
- Competitors: 24 from 12 nations
- Winning time: 3:06.049

Medalists
1st place, gold medalist(s)		Doris Neuner	Austria
2nd place, silver medalist(s)		Angelika Neuner	Austria
3rd place, bronze medalist(s)		Susi Erdmann	Germany

The Women's singles luge competition at the 1992 Winter Olympics in Albertville was held on 11 and 12 February, at La Plagne.

The final results saw the third ever occurrence of female siblings on the same individual's event Olympic podium, with Austrian sisters Angelika Neuner (gold) and Doris Neuner (silver) repeating the achievement of sisters Marielle Goitschel and Christine Goitschel in both the Innsbruck 1964 slalom and 1964 giant slalom.

== Results ==
Rank	Athlete	Country	Run 1	Run 2	Run 3	Run 4	Total
1st place, gold medalist(s)	Doris Neuner	Austria	46.590	46.764	46.637	46.705	3:06.696
2nd place, silver medalist(s)	Angelika Neuner	Austria	46.805	46.724	46.577	46.663	3:06.769
3rd place, bronze medalist(s)	Susi Erdmann	Germany	47.020	46.866	46.627	46.602	3:07.115
4	Gerda Weissensteiner	Italy	46.954	46.988	46.894	46.837	3:07.673
5	Cammy Myler	United States	46.974	47.049	46.962	46.988	3:07.973
6	Gabi Kohlisch	Germany	47.206	47.072	46.911	46.791	3:07.980
7	Andrea Tagwerker	Austria	46.853	46.928	47.250	46.987	3:08.018
8	Nataliya Yakushenko	Unified Team	47.097	47.215	47.178	46.893	3:08.383
9	Erica Terwillegar	United States	47.094	47.124	47.210	47.119	3:08.547
10	Irina Gubkina	Unified Team	47.175	47.273	47.264	47.034	3:08.746
11	Anna Orlova	Latvia	47.263	47.293	47.161	47.081	3:08.798
12	Nadezhda Danilina	Unified Team	47.324	47.215	47.264	47.025	3:08.828
13	Sylke Otto	Germany	47.089	47.460	47.394	47.056	3:08.999
14	Evija Šulce	Latvia	47.386	47.326	47.388	47.107	3:09.207
15	Iluta Gaile	Latvia	47.412	47.192	47.377	47.314	3:09.295
16	Kathy Salmon	Canada	47.522	47.395	47.358	47.246	3:09.521
17	Petra Matechová	Czechoslovakia	47.298	47.323	47.749	47.290	3:09.660
18	Bonny Warner	United States	47.493	47.385	47.513	47.366	3:09.757
19	Natalie Obkircher	Italy	47.432	47.423	47.556	47.490	3:09.901
20	Mária Jasenčáková	Czechoslovakia	47.673	47.483	47.694	47.593	3:10.443
21	Diane Ogle	Australia	47.573	47.682	47.680	47.530	3:10.465
22	Corina Drăgan-Terecoasa	Romania	48.386	48.315	48.358	48.067	3:13.126
23	Anne Abernathy	Virgin Islands	49.201	48.220	48.609	48.312	3:14.342
24	Albena Zdravkova	Bulgaria	48.961	48.880	49.127	49.271	3:16.239
