= Virgin Islands at the 1992 Winter Olympics =

- Flag of the United States Virgin Islands
- IOC code: ISV
- NOC: Virgin Islands Olympic Committee
- Website: www.virginislandsolympics.com

in Albertville
- Competitors: 12 (10 men, 2 women) in 3 sports
- Flag bearer: Anne Abernathy (luge)
- Medals: Gold 0 Silver 0 Bronze 0 Total 0

Winter Olympics appearances (overview)
- 1988; 1992; 1994; 1998; 2002; 2006; 2010; 2014; 2018; 2022; 2026

The United States Virgin Islands competed at the 1992 Winter Olympics in Albertville, France.

== Competitors ==
The following is the list of number of competitors in the Games.

Sport	Men	Women	Total
Alpine skiing	1	1	2
Bobsleigh	8	–	8
Luge	1	1	2
Total	10	2	12

== Alpine skiing ==
Men

Athlete	Event	Race 1	Race 2	Total	
Athlete	Event	Time	Time	Time	Rank
John Campbell	Super-G			1:26.83	74
John Campbell	Giant Slalom	1:20.68	1:19.35	2:40.03	62
John Campbell	Slalom	DNF	–	DNF	–

Women

Athlete	Event	Race 1	Race 2	Total	
Athlete	Event	Time	Time	Time	Rank
Seba Johnson	Giant Slalom	1:23.21	1:27.46	2:50.67	37
Seba Johnson	Slalom	1:08.65	1:01.11	2:09.76	37

== Bobsleigh ==
Sled	Athletes	Event	Run 1		Run 2		Run 3		Run 4		Total	
Sled	Athletes	Event	Time	Rank	Time	Rank	Time	Rank	Time	Rank	Time	Rank
ISV-1	Sven Petersen; Bill Neill	Two-man	1:03.95	45	1:04.21	45	1:04.32	45	1:04.12	45	4:16.60	44
ISV-2	Daniel Burgner; David Entwistle	Two-man	1:04.21	46	1:04.10	44	1:04.12	44	1:04.29	46	4:16.72	45

Sled	Athletes	Event	Run 1		Run 2		Run 3		Run 4		Total	
Sled	Athletes	Event	Time	Rank	Time	Rank	Time	Rank	Time	Rank	Time	Rank
ISV-1	Daniel Burgner; Ernest Mathias; David Entwistle; Bill Neill	Four-man	1:00.92	29	1:01.08	29	DNF	–	–	–	DNF	–
ISV-2	Sven Petersen; Michael Juhlin; James Withey; Paul Zar	Four-man	1:02.45	31	1:02.52	31	1:02.73	29	1:02.65	29	4:10.35	29

== Luge ==
Men

Athlete	Run 1		Run 2		Run 3		Run 4		Total	
Athlete	Time	Rank	Time	Rank	Time	Rank	Time	Rank	Time	Rank
Kyle Heikkila	46.866	27	47.170	28	48.463	32	48.636	31	3:11.135	29

Women

Athlete	Run 1		Run 2		Run 3		Run 4		Total	
Athlete	Time	Rank	Time	Rank	Time	Rank	Time	Rank	Time	Rank
Anne Abernathy	49:201	24	48.220	22	48.609	23	48.312	23	3:14.342	23
