= Italy at the 1992 Winter Olympics =

- IOC code: ITA
- NOC: Italian National Olympic Committee
- Website: www.coni.it (in Italian)

in Albertville
- Competitors: 107 (79 men, 28 women) in 11 sports
- Flag bearer: Alberto Tomba (alpine skiing)
- Medals Ranked 6th: Gold 4 Silver 6 Bronze 4 Total 14

Winter Olympics appearances (overview)
- 1924; 1928; 1932; 1936; 1948; 1952; 1956; 1960; 1964; 1968; 1972; 1976; 1980; 1984; 1988; 1992; 1994; 1998; 2002; 2006; 2010; 2014; 2018; 2022; 2026

Italy competed at the 1992 Winter Olympics in Albertville, France.

== Medalists ==
Medal	Name	Sport	Event	Date
Gold	Josef Polig	Alpine skiing	Men's combined	11 February
Gold	Deborah Compagnoni	Alpine skiing	Women's super-G	18 February
Gold	Alberto Tomba	Alpine skiing	Men's giant slalom	18 February
Gold	Stefania Belmondo	Cross-country skiing	Women's 30 kilometre freestyle	21 February
Silver	Gianfranco Martin	Alpine skiing	Men's combined	11 February
Silver	Marco Albarello	Cross-country skiing	Men's 10 kilometre classical	13 February
Silver	Stefania Belmondo	Cross-country skiing	Women's 10 kilometre freestyle pursuit	15 February
Silver	Giuseppe Puliè; Marco Albarello; Giorgio Vanzetta; Silvio Fauner	Cross-country skiing	Men's 4 × 10 kilometre relay	18 February
Silver	Maurilio De Zolt	Cross-country skiing	Men's 50 kilometre freestyle	22 February
Silver	Alberto Tomba	Alpine skiing	Men's slalom	22 February
Bronze	Hansjörg Raffl; Norbert Huber	Luge	Doubles	14 February
Bronze	Giorgio Vanzetta	Cross-country skiing	Men's 15 kilometre freestyle pursuit	15 February
Bronze	Bice Vanzetta; Manuela Di Centa; Gabriella Paruzzi; Stefania Belmondo	Cross-country skiing	Women's 4 × 5 kilometre relay	17 February
Bronze	Giorgio Vanzetta	Cross-country skiing	Men's 50 kilometre freestyle	22 February

== Competitors ==
The following is the list of number of competitors in the Games.

Sport	Men	Women	Total
Alpine skiing	12	6	18
Biathlon	6	4	10
Bobsleigh	8	–	8
Cross-country skiing	8	5	13
Figure skating	4	3	7
Freestyle skiing	4	2	6
Ice hockey	22	–	22
Luge	6	2	8
Short track speed skating	4	4	8
Ski jumping	3	–	3
Speed skating	2	2	4
Total	79	28	107

== Alpine skiing ==
Men

Athlete	Event	Race 1	Race 2	Total	
Athlete	Event	Time	Time	Time	Rank
Danilo Sbardellotto	Downhill			DNF	–
Gianfranco Martin	Downhill			1:52.48	14
Kristian Ghedina	Downhill			1:52.28	11
Franco Colturi	Downhill			1:52.07	10
Patrick Holzer	Super-G			DNF	–
Alberto Senigagliesi	Super-G			1:15.70	19
Gianfranco Martin	Super-G			1:14.81	12
Josef Polig	Super-G			1:13.88	5
Patrick Holzer	Giant Slalom	DNF	–	DNF	–
Sergio Bergamelli	Giant Slalom	1:06.95	1:04.80	2:11.75	17
Josef Polig	Giant Slalom	1:06.17	1:03.28	2:09.45	9
Alberto Tomba	Giant Slalom	1:04.57	1:02.41	2:06.98	1st place, gold medalist(s)
Konrad Kurt Ladstaetter	Slalom	54.68	55.19	1:49.87	21
Fabio De Crignis	Slalom	53.31	DSQ	DSQ	–
Carlo Gerosa	Slalom	53.18	53.92	1:47.10	11
Alberto Tomba	Slalom	53.01	51.66	1:44.67	2nd place, silver medalist(s)

Men's combined

Athlete	Downhill	Slalom		Total	
Athlete	Time	Time 1	Time 2	Points	Rank
Kristian Ghedina	1:46.65	52.43	52.48	38.96	6
Josef Polig	1:45.78	51.27	50.89	14.58	1st place, gold medalist(s)
Franco Colturi	1:45.59	1:09.46	1:01.78	176.69	31
Gianfranco Martin	1:45.48	50.16	52.60	14.90	2nd place, silver medalist(s)

Women

Athlete	Event	Race 1	Race 2	Total	
Athlete	Event	Time	Time	Time	Rank
Morena Gallizio	Super-G			1:26.19	23
Barbara Merlin	Super-G			1:25.13	16
Bibiana Perez	Super-G			1:24.69	13
Deborah Compagnoni	Super-G			1:21.22	1st place, gold medalist(s)
Bibiana Perez	Giant Slalom	DNF	–	DNF	–
Deborah Compagnoni	Giant Slalom	DNF	–	DNF	–
Lara Magoni	Giant Slalom	1:09.13	DNF	DNF	–
Barbara Merlin	Giant Slalom	1:08.47	1:08.85	2:17.32	16
Astrid Plank	Slalom	DNF	–	DNF	–
Bibiana Perez	Slalom	DNF	–	DNF	–
Lara Magoni	Slalom	49.73	45.27	1:35.00	12

Women's combined

Athlete	Downhill	Slalom		Total	
Athlete	Time	Time 1	Time 2	Points	Rank
Morena Gallizio	1:29.84	36.94	37.62	93.21	16

== Biathlon ==
Men

Event	Athlete	Misses ^{1}	Time	Rank
10 km Sprint	Pieralberto Carrara	3	28:30.1	41
10 km Sprint	Hubert Leitgeb	2	27:40.3	26
10 km Sprint	Johann Passler	3	27:20.4	15
10 km Sprint	Andreas Zingerle	1	26:38.6	7

Event	Athlete	Time	Misses	Adjusted time ^{2}	Rank
20 km	Gottlieb Taschler	59:41.3	3	1'02:41.3	44
20 km	Wilfried Pallhuber	56:35.4	6	1'02:35.4	40
20 km	Andreas Zingerle	56:05.6	4	1'00:05.6	17
20 km	Johann Passler	54:25.9	4	58:25.9	7

Men's 4 x 7.5 km relay

Athletes	Race		
Athletes	Misses ^{1}	Time	Rank
Hubert Leitgeb; Johann Passler; Pieralberto Carrara; Andreas Zingerle	2	1'26:18.1	4

Women

Event	Athlete	Misses ^{1}	Time	Rank
7.5 km Sprint	Siegrid Pallhuber	5	29:23.1	56
7.5 km Sprint	Erica Carrara	4	28:38.5	49
7.5 km Sprint	Monika Schwingshackl	2	27:56.1	37
7.5 km Sprint	Nathalie Santer	3	26:28.7	16

Event	Athlete	Time	Misses	Adjusted time ^{2}	Rank
15 km	Monika Schwingshackl	54:39.5	8	1'02:39.5	57
15 km	Erica Carrara	56:58.8	4	1'00:58.8	53
15 km	Siegrid Pallhuber	54:27.3	4	58:27.3	38
15 km	Nathalie Santer	50:10.3	3	53:10.3	8

Women's 3 x 7.5 km relay

Athletes	Race		
Athletes	Misses ^{1}	Time	Rank
Erica Carrara; Monika Schwingshackl; Nathalie Santer	2	1'24:00.8	13

^{1} A penalty loop of 150 metres had to be skied per missed target.
^{2} One minute added per missed target.

== Bobsleigh ==
Sled	Athletes	Event	Run 1		Run 2		Run 3		Run 4		Total	
Sled	Athletes	Event	Time	Rank	Time	Rank	Time	Rank	Time	Rank	Time	Rank
ITA-1	Günther Huber; Stefano Ticci	Two-man	1:00.36	7	1:00.87	1	1:01.08	3	1:01.41	11	4:03.72	5
ITA-2	Pasquale Gesuito; Antonio Tartaglia	Two-man	1:01.02	15	1:01.07	6	1:01.52	12	1:01.33	8	4:04.94	12

Sled	Athletes	Event	Run 1		Run 2		Run 3		Run 4		Total	
Sled	Athletes	Event	Time	Rank	Time	Rank	Time	Rank	Time	Rank	Time	Rank
ITA-1	Pasquale Gesuito; Antonio Tartaglia; Paolo Canedi; Stefano Ticci	Four-man	58.78	14	58.83	8	59.12	15	59.15	15	3:55.88	12
ITA-2	Günther Huber; Marco Andreatta; Thomas Rottensteiner; Marcantonio Stiffi	Four-man	58.76	13	59.11	17	58.97	13	59.14	14	3:55.98	15

== Cross-country skiing ==
Men

Event	Athlete	Race	
Event	Athlete	Time	Rank
10 km C	Maurilio De Zolt	32:00.1	58
10 km C	Silvio Fauner	28:53.8	10
10 km C	Giorgio Vanzetta	28:26.9	7
10 km C	Marco Albarello	27:55.2	2nd place, silver medalist(s)
15 km pursuit^{1} F	Maurilio De Zolt	DNF	–
15 km pursuit^{1} F	Silvio Fauner	39:58.9	7
15 km pursuit^{1} F	Marco Albarello	38:57.3	4
15 km pursuit^{1} F	Giorgio Vanzetta	38:56.2	3rd place, bronze medalist(s)
30 km C	Gianfranco Polvara	1'26:26.2	20
30 km C	Fulvio Valbusa	1'26:07.1	17
30 km C	Giuseppe Puliè	1'26:02.4	16
30 km C	Marco Albarello	1'23:55.7	4
50 km F	Alfred Runggaldier	2'10:03.1	11
50 km F	Gianfranco Polvara	2'09:27.8	10
50 km F	Giorgio Vanzetta	2'06:42.1	3rd place, bronze medalist(s)
50 km F	Maurilio De Zolt	2'04:39.1	2nd place, silver medalist(s)

^{1} Starting delay based on 10 km results.
C = Classical style, F = Freestyle

Men's 4 × 10 km relay

Athletes	Race	
Athletes	Time	Rank
Giuseppe Puliè; Marco Albarello; Giorgio Vanzetta; Silvio Fauner	1'40:52.7	2nd place, silver medalist(s)

Women

Event	Athlete	Race	
Event	Athlete	Time	Rank
5 km C	Bice Vanzetta	15:28.4	28
5 km C	Gabriella Paruzzi	15:13.9	23
5 km C	Manuela Di Centa	14:55.4	12
5 km C	Stefania Belmondo	14:26.2	4
10 km pursuit^{2} F	Bice Vanzetta	28:48.7	20
10 km pursuit^{2} F	Gabriella Paruzzi	28:38.8	16
10 km pursuit^{2} F	Manuela Di Centa	27:55.7	10
10 km pursuit^{2} F	Stefania Belmondo	26:17.8	2nd place, silver medalist(s)
15 km C	Bice Vanzetta	DNF	–
15 km C	Gabriella Paruzzi	44:44.0	9
15 km C	Stefania Belmondo	44:02.4	5
30 km F	Laura Bettega	1'33:49.3	35
30 km F	Gabriella Paruzzi	1'28:18.1	12
30 km F	Manuela Di Centa	1'27:04.4	6
30 km F	Stefania Belmondo	1'22:30.1	1st place, gold medalist(s)

^{2} Starting delay based on 5 km results.
C = Classical style, F = Freestyle

Women's 4 × 5 km relay

Athletes	Race	
Athletes	Time	Rank
Bice Vanzetta; Manuela Di Centa; Gabriella Paruzzi; Stefania Belmondo	1'00:25.9	3rd place, bronze medalist(s)

== Figure skating ==
Men

Athlete	SP	FS	TFP	Rank
Gilberto Viadana	19	DNF	DNF	–

Pairs

Athletes	SP	FS	TFP	Rank
Anna Tabacchi; Massimo Salvade	15	15	22.5	15

Ice Dancing

Athletes	CD1	CD2	OD	FD	TFP	Rank
Anna Croci; Luca Mantovani	13	13	13	12	25.0	13
Stefania Calegari; Pasquale Camerlengo	5	5	5	5	10.0	5

== Freestyle skiing ==
Men

Athlete	Event	Qualification			Final		
Athlete	Event	Time	Points	Rank	Time	Points	Rank
Giorgio Zini	Moguls	43.96	9.47	43	did not advance		
Paolo Silvestri	Moguls	39.69	15.44	38	did not advance		
Walter Osta	Moguls	40.02	15.81	37	did not advance		
Simone Mottini	Moguls	34.20	19.92	24	did not advance		

Women

Athlete	Event	Qualification			Final		
Athlete	Event	Time	Points	Rank	Time	Points	Rank
Petra Moroder	Moguls	44.83	18.69	11	did not advance		
Silvia Marciandi	Moguls	42.51	21.72	7 Q	40.96	19.66	7

== Ice hockey ==
=== Group A ===
Twelve participating teams were placed in two groups. After playing a round robin, the top four teams in each group advanced to the medal round while the last two teams competed in the consolation round for the 9th to 12th places.

Team advanced to the Final round
Team sent to compete in the Consolation round

Team	GP	W	L	T	GF	GA	DIF	PTS
United States	5	4	0	1	18	7	11	9
Sweden	5	3	0	2	22	11	11	8
Finland	5	3	1	1	22	11	11	7
Germany	5	2	3	0	11	12	-1	4
Italy	5	1	4	0	18	24	-6	2
Poland	5	0	5	0	4	30	-26	0

United States	6:3	Italy
Sweden	7:3	Italy
Italy	7:1	Poland
Germany	5:2	Italy
Finland	5:3	Italy

=== Consolation round 9th-12th places ===
Norway	5:3	Italy

11th-place match

Poland	4:1	Italy 12th

Contestants

- David Delfino
- Michael Zanier
- Jim Camazzola
- Bob Manno
- Anthony Circelli
- Michael de Angelis
- William Stewart
- Giovanni Marchetti
- Georg Comploi
- Robert Oberrauch
- Giuseppe Foglietta
- Santino Pellegrino
- Rick Morocco
- Martino Soracreppa
- Ivano Zanatta
- John Vecchiarelli
- Emilio Iovio
- Robert Ginnetti
- Marco Scapinello
- Lucio Topatigh
- Frank Nigro
- Bruno Zarrillo

- Head coach: Gene Ubriaco

== Luge ==
Men

Athlete	Run 1		Run 2		Run 3		Run 4		Total	
Athlete	Time	Rank	Time	Rank	Time	Rank	Time	Rank	Time	Rank
Oswald Haselrieder	45.698	10	45.319	1	46.252	6	46.007	5	3:03.276	7
Gerhard Plankensteiner	45.676	9	45.752	10	46.313	11	46.167	11	3:03.908	11
Norbert Huber	45.506	5	45.400	4	46.105	4	45.962	4	3:02.973	4

(Men's) Doubles

Athletes	Run 1		Run 2		Total	
Athletes	Time	Rank	Time	Rank	Time	Rank
Hansjörg Raffl; Norbert Huber	46.114	2	46.184	3	1:32.298	3rd place, bronze medalist(s)
Kurt Brugger; Wilfried Huber	46.447	5	46.363	5	1:32.810	5

Women

Athlete	Run 1		Run 2		Run 3		Run 4		Total	
Athlete	Time	Rank	Time	Rank	Time	Rank	Time	Rank	Time	Rank
Natalie Obkircher	47.432	17	47.423	18	47.556	18	47.490	19	3:09.901	19
Gerda Weissensteiner	46.954	4	46.988	5	46.894	4	46.837	5	3:07.673	4

== Short track speed skating ==
Men

Athlete	Event	Round one		Quarter finals		Semi finals		Finals	
Athlete	Event	Time	Rank	Time	Rank	Time	Rank	Time	Final rank
Hugo Herrnhof	1000 m	1:33.35	2 Q	1:34.85	3	did not advance			
Orazio Fagone	1000 m	1:34.91	4	did not advance					
Orazio Fagone; Hugo Herrnhof; Roberto Peretti; Mirko Vuillermin	5000 m relay			7:28.32	2 Q	7:32.80	4 QB	7:32.80	8

Women

Athlete	Event	Round one		Quarter finals		Semi finals		Finals	
Athlete	Event	Time	Rank	Time	Rank	Time	Rank	Time	Final rank
Cristina Sciolla	500 m	52.53	3	did not advance					
Marinella Canclini	500 m	47.00	1 Q	1:27.18	4	did not advance			
Marinella Canclini; Maria Rosa Candido; Ketty La Torre; Cristina Sciolla	3000 m relay					4:47.31	4	did not advance	

== Ski jumping ==
Athlete	Event	Jump 1		Jump 2		Total	
Athlete	Event	Distance	Points	Distance	Points	Points	Rank
Ivo Pertile	Normal hill	76.0	84.6	76.0	85.1	169.7	52
Roberto Cecon	Normal hill	80.5	94.3	79.5	91.2	185.5	37
Ivan Lunardi	Normal hill	86.0	104.1	78.5	89.1	193.2	22
Roberto Cecon	Large hill	95.0	68.0	98.5	73.9	141.9	32
Ivo Pertile	Large hill	95.5	71.2	90.0	62.0	133.2	38
Ivan Lunardi	Large hill	110.5	99.2	102.5	86.0	185.2	7

Men's team large hill

Athletes	Result	
Athletes	Points ^{1}	Rank
Roberto Cecon; Ivo Pertile; Ivan Lunardi	472.2	13

^{1} Three (for most countries four) teams members performed two jumps each. The best three were counted.

== Speed skating ==
Men

Event	Athlete	Race	
Event	Athlete	Time	Rank
1500 m	Alessandro De Taddei	2:00.86	30
1500 m	Roberto Sighel	1:57.32	11
5000 m	Roberto Sighel	7:16.55	14
10,000 m	Roberto Sighel	14:38.23	9

Women

Event	Athlete	Race	
Event	Athlete	Time	Rank
1500 m	Elena Belci	2:10.75	19
3000 m	Elke Felicetti	4:44.14	23
3000 m	Elena Belci	4:34.28	14
5000 m	Elke Felicetti	8:08.44	20
5000 m	Elena Belci	7:50.42	10
