= Focșeneanu =

Focșeneanu is a Romanian surname. It is a toponymic surname, derived from Focșani. Notable people with the surname include:

- Dumitru Focșeneanu (1935–2019), Romanian bobsledder
- Emilian Focșeneanu (born 1966), Romanian alpine skier
