= Yordan Ivanov =

Yordan Ivanov may refer to:

- Yordan Ivanov (bobsleigh) (born 1966), Bulgarian Olympic bobsledder
- Yordan Ivanov (equestrian) (born 1932), Bulgarian Olympic equestrian
- Yordan Ivanov (literary historian) (1872–1947), Bulgarian scholar
