= Colturi =

Colturi is an Italian surname. Notable people with the surname include:

- Franco Colturi (born 1970), Italian alpine skier
- Katia Colturi (born 1971), Italian short track speed skater
- Lara Colturi (born 2006), Italian-born Albanian alpine skier
- Luigi Colturi (1967–2010), Italian alpine skier
