= Glenn Turner (disambiguation) =

Glenn Turner (born 1947) is a New Zealand cricketer.

Glenn Turner may also refer to:

- Glenn Turner (field hockey) (born 1984), Australian field hockey player
- Glenn Turner (bobsleigh) (born 1964), Australian Olympic bobsledder
- Glenn P. Turner (1889–1975), Wisconsin politician
- Glenn W. Turner, American multi-level marketing salesman
- Maurice Glenn Turner (died 1995), victim of murderer Lynn Turner
