= Juhlin =

Juhlin is a Swedish surname. Notable people with the surname include:

- Michael Juhlin (born 1945), American Virgin Islander bobsledder
- Patrik Juhlin (born 1970), Swedish ice hockey player
- Richard Juhlin (born 1962), Swedish journalist

== See also ==
- Julin (surname)
