= Nikolay Dimitrov =

Nikolay Dimitrov may refer to:

- Nikolay Dimitrov (bobsleigh) (born 1963), Bulgarian Olympic bobsledder
- Nikolay Dimitrov (footballer, born 1970), Bulgarian former footballer
- Nikolay Dimitrov (footballer, born 1987), Bulgarian football winger
- Nikolay Dimitrov (footballer, born 1990), Bulgarian football defender
- Nikolay Dimitrov (wrestler), Bulgarian wrestler
