= Pashkov =

Pashokov (feminine: Pashkova) is a surname. Notable people with the surname include:

- Aleksandr Pashkov (born 1953), Russian bobsledder
- Alexander Pashkov (born 1944), Soviet Hockey League player
- Eugeniya Pashkova (born 1989), Russian tennis player
- Georgy Pashkov (1886–1925), Russian artist
- Nadezhda Pashkova (born 1962), Russian cyclist
- Oleksii Pashkov (born 1981), Ukrainian track and field athlete
- Vladimir Pashkov (born 1961), Russian politician

== See also ==
- Pashkov House, a mansion in Moscow, Russia
