= Dimitar Dimitrov =

Dimitar Dimitrov may refer to:

- Dimitar Dimitrov (bobsleigh) (born 1966), Bulgarian Olympic bobsledder
- Dimitar Dimitrov (football manager) (born 1959), Bulgarian football manager
- Dimitar Dimitrov (writer) (born 1937), former Macedonian Minister of Culture
- Dimitar Dimitrov (volleyball) (born 1952), Bulgarian former volleyball player
- Dimitar Dimitrov (footballer, born 1949), Bulgarian footballer
- Dimitar Dimitrov (footballer, born 1990), Bulgarian footballer
- Dimitar Dimitrov (gymnast) (born 1978), Bulgarian artistic gymnast
- Dimitar Dimitrov (basketball), Bulgarian basketball player
- Dimitar Dimitrov (zoologist), zoologist interested in spiders
- Dimitar Dimitrov (sambist), international medalist in sambo
