= Greg Harrell =

American bobsledder (born 1961)

Personal information
- Born: April 22, 1961 (age 65) Harrellsville, North Carolina, U.S.

Sport
- Sport: Bobsleigh

Greg Harrell (born April 22, 1961) is an American bobsledder. He competed in the two-man event at the 1992 Winter Olympics. He played college football for the Maryland Terrapins.

== Biography ==
Harrell attended Ahoskie High School in Hertford County, North Carolina, and later received All-American honors as a wide receiver.

Harrell played American football as a tight end for the University of Maryland, and was part of the developmental squads with the San Diego Chargers and the Los Angeles Raiders. He also played in the NFL Europe league for the London Monarchs. While playing for the San Diego Chargers, Harrell suffered a knee injury that kept him out of the game for three seasons.

In 1988, Harrell began to train for the bobsleigh team to represent the United States at the Winter Olympics. During this spell, he also played four seasons for the Los Angeles Raiders. In 1991, he was part of the bobsleigh team that won silver and bronze at the World Bobsled Championships.

In 1992, Harrell made the selection for the US Olympic bobsleigh team. He was initially not selected for the team, but won a court case and got picked for the Olympics.

Following his sporting career, Harrell became a motivational speaker and worked as a mortgage broker.
