= Stéphane Poirot =

French bobsledder

Personal information
- Nationality: French
- Born: 21 January 1970 (age 56) Cornimont, France

Sport
- Sport: Bobsleigh

Stéphane Poirot (French: [stefan pwaʁo]; born 21 January 1970) is a French bobsledder. He competed in the four man event at the 1992 Winter Olympics.
