= Harald Winkler =

Austrian bobsledder

Medal record

Bobsleigh

Olympic Games
Gold medal – first place	1992 Albertville	Four-man

World Championships
Silver medal – second place	1993 Igls	Four-man
Bronze medal – third place	1990 St. Moritz	Four-man

Harald Winkler (born 17 December 1962) is an Austrian bobsledder who competed in the late 1980s and early 1990s. He won a gold medal in the four-man event with teammates Ingo Appelt, Gerhard Haidacher and Thomas Schroll at the 1992 Winter Olympics in Albertville.

Winkler also won two medals in the four-man event at the FIBT World Championships with a silver in 1993 and a bronze in 1990.
