= Vladimir Lyubovitsky =

Russian bobsledder

Personal information
- Nationality: Russian
- Born: 4 January 1964 (age 61); Kungur, Russia

Sport
- Sport: Bobsleigh

Vladimir Lyubovitsky (born 4 January 1964) is a Russian bobsledder. He competed in the four man event at the 1992 Winter Olympics, representing the Unified Team.
