= Ricardo Rodríguez (bobsleigh) =

Mexican bobsledder (born 1967)

Personal information
- Nationality: Mexican
- Born: 21 October 1967 (age 57)

Sport
- Sport: Bobsleigh

Ricardo Rodríguez (born 21 October 1967) is a Mexican bobsledder. He competed in the four man event at the 1992 Winter Olympics.
