= Didier Stil =

French bobsledder

Personal information
- Nationality: French
- Born: 13 August 1964 (age 60); Sainte-Adresse, France

Sport
- Sport: Bobsleigh

Didier Stil (born 13 August 1964) is a French bobsledder. He competed in the four man event at the 1992 Winter Olympics.
