= Francisco Negrete =

Mexican bobsledder (born 1966)

Personal information
- Nationality: Mexican
- Born: 21 October 1966 (age 58)

Sport
- Sport: Bobsleigh

Francisco Negrete (born 21 October 1966) is a Mexican bobsledder. He competed in the four man event at the 1992 Winter Olympics.
