= Fabiana Lovece =

Argentine biathlete (born 1972)

Personal information
- Nationality: Argentine
- Born: 17 July 1972 (age 52)

Sport
- Sport: Biathlon

Fabiana Lovece (born 17 July 1972) is an Argentine biathlete. She competed in the women's sprint event at the 1992 Winter Olympics.
