= Diane Ogle =

Australian luger

Personal information
- Born: 29 December 1965 (age 60) St Ives, Australia

Sport
- Country: Australia
- Sport: Luge

Diane Ogle (born 29 December 1965) is an Australian former singles luge competitor who competed at two World Championships and the 1992 Winter Olympic Games.

Ogle competed in the singles luge event at the 1990 World Championships held in Calgary, Canada and finished in 24th place. The following year in Winterberg, Germany she finished in 18th place in World Championships.

She was the first Australian to compete in luge at an Olympic Games when she competed at Albertville, France in 1992. She completed four runs and finished in 21st place.
