= Günther Eger =

German bobsledder (born 1964)

Olympic medal record

Men's Bobsleigh

Representing Germany
Bronze medal – third place	1992 Albertville	Two-man

Günther Eger (born 7 September 1964 in Tegernsee) is a German bobsledder who competed in the early 1990s. He won the bronze medal in the two-man event at the 1992 Winter Olympics in Albertville, France.
