= Axel Kühn =

German bobsledder (born 1967)

Medal record

Men's Bobsleigh

Representing Germany

Olympic Games
Silver medal – second place	1992 Albertville	Four-man

World Championships
Gold medal – first place	1991 Altenberg	Four-man

Axel Kühn (born 22 June 1967 in Erfurt) is a German bobsledder who competed in the early 1990s. He won a silver medal in the four-man event at the 1992 Winter Olympics in Albertville.

Kühn also won a gold medal in the four-man event at the 1991 FIBT World Championships in Altenberg.
