= Brian Richardson (bobsleigh) =

American bobsledder (born 1955)

Brian Edward Richardson
Personal information
- Born: June 7, 1955 (age 71) San Jose, California, U.S.
- Died: September 7, 2022 Los Gatos, California

Sport
- Sport: Bobsleigh

Brian Richardson (born June 7, 1955) was an American bobsledder. He competed in the two man event at the 1992 Winter Olympics.
