= Hsu Kuo-jung =

Taiwanese bobsledder (born 1970)

Personal information
- Nationality: Taiwanese
- Born: 23 January 1970 (age 55)

Sport
- Sport: Bobsleigh

Hsu Kuo-jung (born 23 January 1970) is a Taiwanese bobsledder. He competed in the four man event at the 1992 Winter Olympics.
