= Dominique Klinnik =

French bobsledder

Personal information
- Nationality: French
- Born: 11 February 1965 (age 60)

Sport
- Sport: Bobsleigh

Dominique Klinnik (born 11 February 1965) is a French bobsledder. He competed in the four man event at the 1992 Winter Olympics.
