= Rudolf Lochner =

German bobsledder (born 1953)

Medal record

Men's Bobsleigh

Representing Germany

Olympic Games
Silver medal – second place	1992 Albertville	Two-man

World Championships
Gold medal – first place	1991 Altenberg	Two-man

World Cup Championships
Bronze medal – third place	1991-92	Two-man

Rudolf "Rudi" Lochner (born 29 March 1953 in Berchtesgaden) is a German bobsledder who competed in the early 1990s. He won the silver medal in the two-man event at the 1992 Winter Olympics in Albertville.

Lochner also won a gold medal in the two-man event at the 1991 FIBT World Championships in Altenberg. He also finished third in the Bobsleigh World Cup two-man championships in 1991-2. German bobsledder Johannes Lochner is his nephew.
