= Edd Horler =

British bobsledder

Personal information
- Nationality: British
- Born: 13 February 1963 (age 62); Reading, England

Sport
- Sport: Bobsleigh

Edd Horler (born 13 February 1963) is a British bobsledder. He competed in the four man event at the 1992 Winter Olympics.
