= Chuck Leonowicz =

American bobsledder

Personal information
- Born: January 16, 1958 Schenectady, New York, United States
- Died: September 9, 2000 (aged 42) Saratoga, New York, United States

Sport
- Sport: Bobsleigh

Chuck Leonowicz (January 16, 1958 – September 9, 2000) was an American bobsledder. He competed in the four man event at the 1992 Winter Olympics.
