= Gerhard Haidacher =

Austrian bobsledder (born 1963)

Medal record

Bobsleigh

Olympic Games
Gold medal – first place	1992 Albertville	Four-man

World Championships
Silver medal – second place	1993 Igls	Four-man

Gerhard Haidacher (born 29 April 1963) is an Austrian bobsledder who competed in the late 1980s and early 1990s. He won a gold medal in the four-man event with teammates Ingo Appelt, Harald Winkler and Thomas Schroll at the 1992 Winter Olympics in Albertville.

Haidacher also earned a silver medal in the four-man event at the 1993 FIBT World Championships in Igls.
