= Helena Černohorská =

Czech biathlete (born 1970)

Personal information
- Nationality: Czech
- Born: 18 January 1970 (age 55)

Sport
- Sport: Biathlon

Helena Černohorská (born 18 January 1970) is a Czech biathlete. She competed in the women's sprint event at the 1992 Winter Olympics.
