= Petra Matechová =

Czech luger (born 1971)

Personal information
- Nationality: Czech
- Born: 8 December 1971 (age 53)

Sport
- Sport: Luge

Petra Matechová (born 8 December 1971) is a Czech luger. She competed in the women's singles event at the 1992 Winter Olympics.
