= Felicetti =

Felicetti is an Italian surname. Notable people with the surname include:

- Dino Felicetti (born 1970), Italian-Canadian ice hockey player
- Elke Felicetti (born 1970), Italian speed skater
- Luca Felicetti (born 1981), Italian ice hockey player
