= Aleksey Golovin (bobsleigh) =

Russian bobsledder

Personal information
- Full name: Aleksey Anatolyevich Golovin
- Nationality: Russian
- Born: 6 November 1962 (age 62); Oryol, Russia
- Height: 190 cm (6 ft 3 in)
- Weight: 110 kg (243 lb)

Sport
- Sport: Bobsleigh

Aleksey Anatolyevich Golovin (Алексей Анатольевич Головин, born 6 November 1962) is a Russian bobsledder. He competed at the two-man event at the 1992 Winter Olympics.
