= Patrice Anderson =

American biathlete (born 1959)

Personal information
- Full name: Patrice Marie Anderson
- Nationality: American
- Born: November 22, 1959 (age 65); Duluth, Minnesota, United States

Sport
- Sport: Biathlon

Patrice Marie Anderson (born November 22, 1959) is an American biathlete. She competed in the women's individual event at the 1992 Winter Olympics.
