= Spas Zlatev =

Bulgarian biathlete (born 1964)

Personal information
- Nationality: Bulgarian
- Born: 14 May 1964 (age 60); Samokov, Bulgaria

Sport
- Sport: Biathlon

Spas Zlatev (born 14 May 1964) is a Bulgarian biathlete and cross-country skier. He competed at the 1984 Winter Olympics and the 1992 Winter Olympics.

== Biography ==
Zlatev was born on 14 May 1964 in Samokov, Sofia Oblast.

== Career ==
He competed in the 10 and 20 km biathlon events at the 1984 Winter Olympics. He also competed in the 1992 Winter Olympics biathlon, where he competed in the 10 km, 20 km, 4 × 7.5 km relay, and the 50 km cross-country skiing event.

=== 1984 Winter Olympics ===
Biathlon:

10 km: 28th out of 64 participants
20 km: 37th out of 63 participants

=== 1992 Winter Olympics ===
Biathlon:

10 km: 54th out of 94 participants
20 km: 14th out of 94 participants
4 × 7.5 km relay: 14th of 21 relays

Cross-country skiing:

50 km: 59th out of 73 participants

In 1984, Zlatev won one first and one third place in the Biathlon World Cup for Youth in Pontresina, Switzerland. In 1989, he won fourth place in the Biathlon World Cup in Obertilliach, Austria.
