= James Withey =

United States Virgin Islands bobsledder

Personal information
- Nationality: American Virgin Islander
- Born: April 17, 1947 (age 77)

Sport
- Sport: Bobsleigh

James Withey (born April 17, 1947) is a bobsledder who represented the United States Virgin Islands. He competed in the four man event at the 1992 Winter Olympics.
