= Daniel Burgner =

US Virgin Islands bobsledder (born 1954)

Personal information
- Nationality: American Virgin Islander
- Born: December 10, 1954 (age 70)

Sport
- Sport: Bobsleigh

Daniel Burgner (born December 10, 1954) is a bobsledder who represented the United States Virgin Islands. He competed in the two man and four man events at the 1992 Winter Olympics.
