= Laurențiu Budur =

Romanian bobsledder

Personal information
- Nationality: Romanian
- Born: 12 February 1963 (age 62)

Sport
- Sport: Bobsleigh

Laurențiu Budur (born 12 February 1963) is a Romanian bobsledder. He competed in the two man and the four man events at the 1992 Winter Olympics.
