= Bill Neill (bobsleigh) =

United States Virgin Islands bobsledder

Personal information
- Nationality: American Virgin Islander
- Born: January 22, 1965 (age 60)

Sport
- Sport: Bobsleigh

Bill Neill (born January 22, 1965) is a bobsledder who represented the United States Virgin Islands. He competed in the two man and four man events at the 1992 Winter Olympics.
