= Joe Sawyer (bobsleigh) =

American bobsledder

Personal information
- Born: April 11, 1966 (age 60) Denver, Colorado, United States

Sport
- Sport: Bobsleigh

Joe Sawyer (born April 11, 1966) is an American bobsledder. He competed at the 1992 Winter Olympics and the 1994 Winter Olympics.
