= Sven Petersen =

United States Virgin Islands bobsledder

Personal information
- Nationality: American Virgin Islander
- Born: September 12, 1954 (age 70)

Sport
- Sport: Bobsleigh

Sven Petersen (born September 12, 1954) is a bobsledder who represented the United States Virgin Islands. He competed in the two man and four man events at the 1992 Winter Olympics.
