= Albena Zdravkova =

Bulgarian luger

Personal information
- Nationality: Bulgarian
- Born: 22 September 1969 (age 55)

Sport
- Sport: Luge

Albena Zdravkova (Bulgarian: Албена Здравкова; born 22 September 1969) is a Bulgarian luger. She competed in the women's singles event at the 1992 Winter Olympics.
