= Daniela Gârbacea =

Romanian biathlete (born 1974)

Personal information
- Nationality: Romanian
- Born: 14 January 1974 (age 51)

Sport
- Sport: Biathlon

Daniela Gârbacea (born 14 January 1974) is a Romanian biathlete. She competed in the women's individual event at the 1992 Winter Olympics.
