= Nicolae Șerban =

Romanian biathlete (born 1967)

Personal information
- Nationality: Romanian
- Born: 2 July 1967 (age 57)

Sport
- Sport: Biathlon

Nicolae Șerban (born 2 July 1967) is a Romanian biathlete. He competed in the men's 20 km individual event at the 1992 Winter Olympics.
