= Gheorghe Vasile =

Romanian biathlete (born 1967)

Personal information
- Nationality: Romanian
- Born: 9 September 1967 (age 57); Valea Doftanei, Romania

Sport
- Sport: Biathlon

Gheorghe Vasile (born 9 September 1967) is a Romanian biathlete. He competed in the men's 20 km individual event at the 1994 Winter Olympics.
