= Aleksandr Pashkov =

Russian bobsledder

Personal information
- Nationality: Russian
- Born: 27 August 1953 (age 71); Saint Petersburg, Russia

Sport
- Sport: Bobsleigh

Aleksandr Pashkov (born 27 August 1953) is a Russian bobsledder. He competed in the four man event at the 1992 Winter Olympics, representing the Unified Team.
