= Thomas Schroll =

Austrian bobsledder

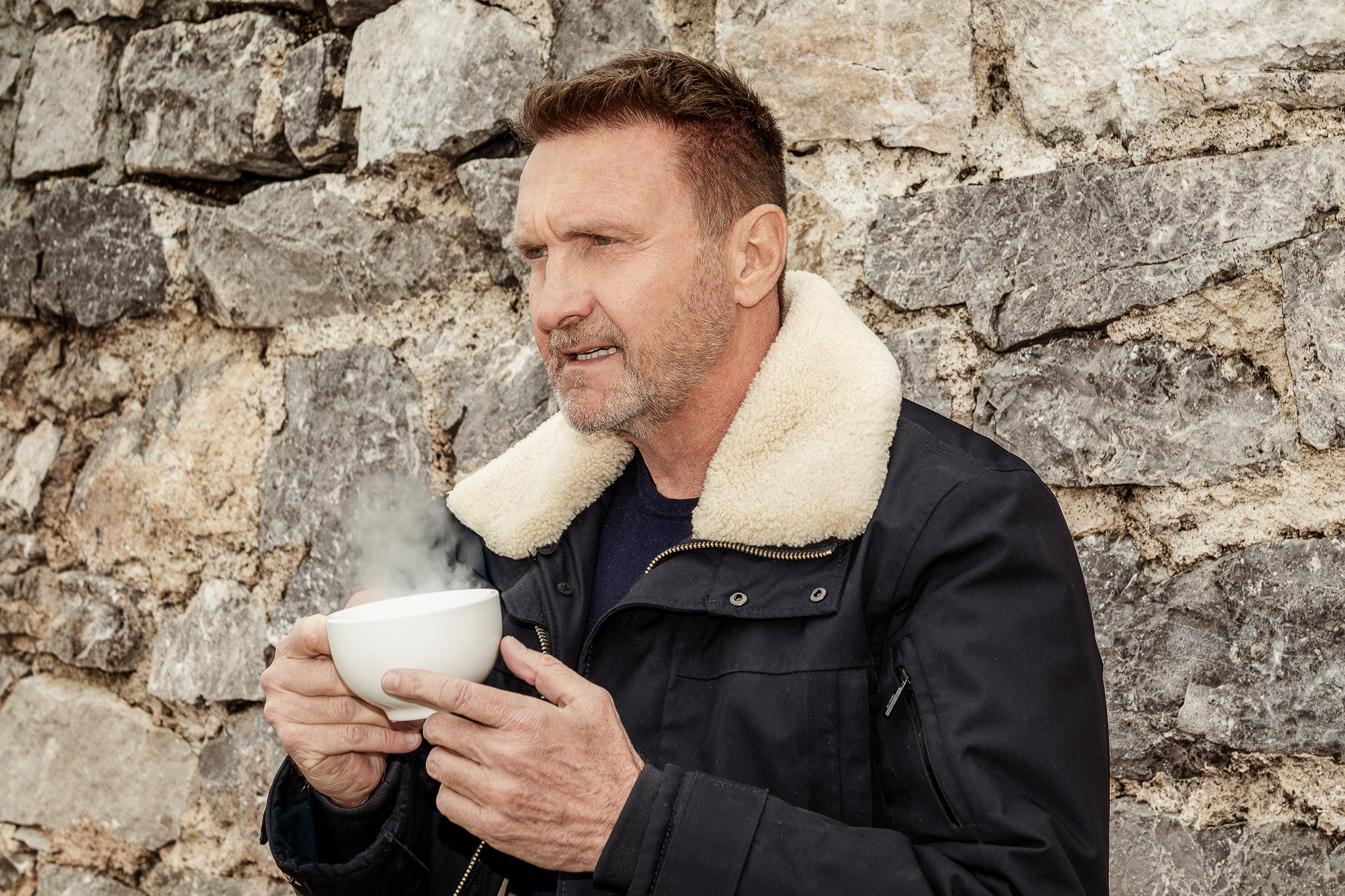

Personal information
- Nationality: Austrian
- Born: 26 November 1965 (age 60) Hall in Tirol, Austria

Sport
- Country: Austria
- Sport: Bobsleigh
- Event: Four-man
- Club: Bob-Club Igls
Medal record
Men's bobsleigh
Representing Austria
Olympic Games
Gold medal – first place	1992 Albertville	Four-man
World Championships
Silver medal – second place	1995 Winterberg	Four-man
European Championships
Gold medal – first place	1990 Igls	Four-man
Bronze medal – third place	1989 Winterberg	Four-man

Thomas Schroll (born 26 November 1965) is an Austrian former bobsledder who competed from the late 1980s to the mid-1990s. He won a gold medal in the four-man event at the 1992 Winter Olympics in Albertville. Since 2006, he has been managing director of the Nordkette Cable Car in Innsbruck.

== Sporting career ==
Schroll was a member of the Bob-Club Igls in Innsbruck. Throughout his career, he competed as a push athlete in Austrian crews piloted by Peter Kienast, Ingo Appelt, and Hubert Schösser.

He won his first international medal at the 1989 European Championships in Winterberg, where he took third place in the four-man event together with Peter Kienast, Franz Siegl, and Kurt Teigl, behind the Austrian sled driven by Ingo Appelt and the East German sled driven by Harald Czudaj. The 1990 European Championships were held on the track at Igls and produced an Austrian one-two: Kienast, Johann Lindner, Martin Riedl and Schroll finished ahead of Appelt, Gerhard Redl, Jürgen Mandl, and Harald Winkler.

At the 1992 Winter Olympics in Albertville, Schroll was part of Ingo Appelt's crew. He and Appelt placed fourth in the two-man event; in the four-man event, Appelt, Harald Winkler, Gerhard Haidacher and Schroll won the gold medal two hundredths of a second ahead of the German sled driven by Wolfgang Hoppe. As of 2026, it remains the only Olympic gold medal won by Austrian bobsledders.

Two years later, Schroll competed with Hubert Schösser in the two-man event at the 1994 Winter Olympics in Lillehammer and finished fifth. In 1995, Schösser, Gerhard Redl, Schroll and Martin Schützenauer took second place in the four-man event at the World Championships, behind Wolfgang Hoppe's sled.

== Later career ==
From the mid-1990s, Schroll worked for a time as a fitness coach, including for the Innsbruck ice hockey club HC Tiroler Wasserkraft Innsbruck.

Since the early 2000s, Schroll has worked as a managing director in the cable car and aerial lift sector. In 2006, he moved from the Schlick cable car company to the Nordkette Cable Car (Nordkettenbahn) in Innsbruck and has been its managing director ever since. Since its introduction in 2008, he has also chaired the Freizeitticket Tirol initiative, an annual season pass for sports and cultural activities for residents of Tyrol.

== Personal life ==
In 1992, the municipal hall of Neumarkt in der Steiermark, where Schroll spent part of his childhood and youth, was renamed Thomas-Schroll-Halle.

Schroll is married.
