= Vera Vucheva =

Bulgarian biathlete (born 1973)

Personal information
- Nationality: Bulgarian
- Born: 22 January 1973 (age 52)

Sport
- Sport: Biathlon

Vera Vucheva (Bulgarian: Вера Вучева, born 22 January 1973) is a Bulgarian biathlete. She competed in the women's sprint event at the 1992 Winter Olympics.
