= Laszlo Hodos =

Romanian bobsledder

Personal information
- Nationality: Romanian
- Born: 6 June 1966 (age 58); Târgu Mureș, Romania

Sport
- Sport: Bobsleigh

Laszlo Hodos (born 6 June 1966) is a Romanian bobsledder. He competed in the four man event at the 1992 Winter Olympics.
