= Spas Gulev =

Bulgarian biathlete (born 1971)

Personal information
- Nationality: Bulgarian
- Born: 20 September 1971 (age 53)

Sport
- Sport: Biathlon

Spas Gulev (Bulgarian: Спас Гулев, born 20 September 1971) is a Bulgarian biathlete. He competed in the men's sprint event at the 1992 Winter Olympics.
