= Ernest Matthias =

Personal information
- Nationality: American Virgin Islander
- Born: August 17, 1963 (age 63)

Sport
- Sport: Bobsleigh

Ernest Matthias (born August 17, 1963) is a bobsledder who represented the United States Virgin Islands.He competed in the four man event at the 1992 Winter Olympics. Matthias later worked as a dive instructor and as deputy fire chief.
