= Marco Andreatta =

Italian bobsledder (born 1962)

Personal information
- Nationality: Italian
- Born: 9 January 1962 (age 63); Bressanone, Italy

Sport
- Sport: Bobsleigh

Marco Andreatta (born 9 January 1962) is an Italian bobsledder. He competed in the four man event at the 1992 Winter Olympics.
