= Borislav Dimitrachkov =

Bulgarian alpine skier (born 1968)

Personal information
- Nationality: Bulgarian
- Born: 1 June 1968 (age 58) Borovets, Bulgaria

Sport
- Sport: Alpine skiing

Borislav Dimitrachkov (Bulgarian: Борислав Димитрачков, born 1 June 1968) is a Bulgarian alpine skier. He competed at the 1988 Winter Olympics and the 1992 Winter Olympics.
