= Glenn Turner (bobsleigh) =

Australian bobsledder

Personal information
- Nationality: Australian
- Born: 5 January 1964 (age 61); Caringbah, New South Wales, Australia

Sport
- Sport: Bobsleigh

Glenn Turner (born 5 January 1964) is an Australian bobsledder. He competed in the two man event at the 1992 Winter Olympics.
