= Randy Will =

American bobsledder

Randy Will (born August 24, 1964) is an American former bobsledder who competed in the 1992 and 1994 and 1988 Winter Olympics.

== Biography ==
Randy Will was born in New York in 1964. At Maine-Endwell High School, he was involved in the sport of Track and Field. During his Junior and Senior years he attended Green Mountain Valley School in Vermont which is a ski school for excelled skiers. While ski racing in 1983, he had severe knee injury, which in turn ruined his ski racing career. Randy then became a bobsledder. While in the sport of bobsled, he achieved six national championships, 1985 rookie of the year, four world track records and three U.S. Olympic team births. He competed in the Calgary Olympics (1988), Albertville Olympics (1992), and Lillehammer Olympics (1994). He retired from the sport in 1994 and began coaching the national Bobsled team. He was a Cross Country and Track and Field coach for Maine-Endwell High School from 1988 to 1994. In 1996, he was named in USOC Developmental Coach of the Year in bobsledding. In 2002, he coached Jim Shea Jr. in the sport of skeleton which led to a gold medal.
