= Martin Standmann =

Austrian cross-country skier

Personal information
- Nationality: Austrian
- Born: 18 June 1968 (age 56)

Sport
- Sport: Cross-country skiing

Martin Standmann (born 18 June 1968) is an Austrian cross-country skier. He competed in the men's 30 kilometre classical event at the 1992 Winter Olympics.
