= Aurel Foiciuc =

Romanian alpine skier (born 1967)

Personal information
- Nationality: Romanian
- Born: 12 July 1967 (age 57)

Sport
- Sport: Alpine skiing

Aurel Foiciuc (born 12 July 1967) is a Romanian alpine skier. He competed in five events at the 1992 Winter Olympics.
