= Boycho Popov =

Bulgarian biathlete (born 1970)

Personal information
- Nationality: Bulgarian
- Born: 13 August 1970 (age 54)

Sport
- Sport: Biathlon

Boycho Popov (Bulgarian: Бойчо Попов; born 13 August 1970) is a Bulgarian biathlete. He competed in the men's 20 km individual event at the 1992 Winter Olympics.
