= Elemer-György Tanko =

Romanian cross-country skier (born 1968)

Personal information
- Nationality: Romanian
- Born: 11 October 1968 (age 56); Gheorgheni, Romania

Sport
- Sport: Cross-country skiing

Elemer-György Tanko (born 11 October 1968) is a Romanian cross-country skier. He competed in the men's 10 kilometre classical event at the 1994 Winter Olympics.
