= Petar Dichev =

Bulgarian alpine skier (born 1969)

Personal information
- Nationality: Bulgarian
- Born: 16 June 1969 (age 57) Smolyan, Bulgaria

Sport
- Sport: Alpine skiing

Petar Dichev (Bulgarian: Петър Дичев, born 16 June 1969) is a Bulgarian alpine skier. He competed at the 1992, 1994 and the 1998 Winter Olympics.
