= Franco Colturi =

Italian alpine skier (born 1970)

Franco Colturi (born 26 January 1970) is an Italian former alpine skier who competed in the 1992 Winter Olympics.}
