= Ivan Karacholov =

Bulgarian luger (born 1968)

Personal information
- Nationality: Bulgarian
- Born: 17 February 1968 (age 57); Topolovgrad, Bulgaria

Sport
- Sport: Luge

Ivan Karacholov (Bulgarian: Иван Карачолов) (born 17 February 1968) is a Bulgarian former luger. He competed at the 1992 Winter Olympics and the 1994 Winter Olympics.
