= Cerasela Hordobețiu =

Romanian speed skater

Personal information
- Nationality: Romanian
- Born: 11 October 1968 (age 56); Sibiu, Romania

Sport
- Sport: Speed skating

Cerasela Simona Hordobețiu (born 11 October 1968) is a Romanian speed skater. She competed at the 1992 Winter Olympics and the 1994 Winter Olympics.

Hordobețiu made her debut at international championships in the 1987 World Junior Championships, where she finished seventeenth. The following year she finished eighth, but was later disqualified for doping use along with her teammate Mihaela Dascălu, making it impossible for her to make the 1988 Winter Olympics at Calgary.
