= Paolo Canedi =

Italian bobsledder (born 1965)

Personal information
- Nationality: Italian
- Born: 27 November 1965 (age 59); Milan, Italy

Sport
- Sport: Bobsleigh

Paolo Canedi (born 27 November 1965) is an Italian bobsledder. He competed at the 1992 Winter Olympics and the 1994 Winter Olympics.
