= Ioan Apostol =

Romanian luger (born 1959)

Ioan Apostol (born 14 January 1959) is a Romanian luger who competed in four Winter Olympics. He was born in Valea Doftanei, Prahova County.

He earned his best finish of fourth in the men's doubles event at Albertville in 1992. Since 2002, Apostol has been the director of development for small nations for the International Luge Federation (FIL).
