= Ilko Karacholov =

Bulgarian luger (born 1969)

Personal information
- Nationality: Bulgarian
- Born: 25 February 1969 (age 56) Topolovgrad, Bulgaria

Sport
- Sport: Luge

Ilko Karacholov (Bulgarian: Илко Карачолов) (born 25 February 1969) is a Bulgarian former luger. He competed at the 1992 Winter Olympics and the 1994 Winter Olympics.
