= Corina Drăgan-Terecoasa =

Romanian luger (born 1971)

Personal information
- Nationality: Romanian
- Born: 15 September 1971 (age 53); Comarnic, Romania

Sport
- Sport: Luge

Corina Drăgan-Terecoasa (born 15 December 1971) is a Romanian luger. She competed at the 1992 Winter Olympics and the 1998 Winter Olympics.
