= Iskren Plankov =

Bulgarian cross-country skier (born 1969)

Personal information
- Nationality: Bulgarian
- Born: 28 November 1969 (age 55); Pashovo, Bulgaria

Sport
- Sport: Cross-country skiing

Iskren Plankov (born 28 November 1969) is a Bulgarian cross-country skier. He competed at the 1992 Winter Olympics and the 1994 Winter Olympics.
