= Michael Juhlin =

United States Virgin Islands bobsledder

Personal information
- Nationality: American Virgin Islander
- Born: October 19, 1945 (age 79)

Sport
- Sport: Bobsleigh

Michael Juhlin (born October 19, 1945) is a bobsledder who represented the United States Virgin Islands. He competed in the four man event at the 1992 Winter Olympics.
