= Nikolay Dimitrov (bobsleigh) =

Bulgarian bobsledder (born 1963)

Personal information
- Full name: Nikolay Dimitrov
- Nationality: Bulgarian
- Born: 18 August 1963 (age 62) Pleven, Bulgaria

Sport
- Sport: Bobsleigh

Nikolay Dimitrov (Bulgarian: Николай Димитров, born 18 August 1963) is a Bulgarian bobsledder. He competed in the two man event at the 1992 Winter Olympics.
