= Zsolt Baló =

Romanian speed skater

Personal information
- Nationality: Romanian
- Born: 21 October 1971 (age 53); Miercurea Ciuc, Romania

Sport
- Sport: Speed skating

Zsolt Baló (born October 21, 1971) is a Romanian speed skater. He competed for Romania at the 1992 Winter Olympics and the 1994 Winter Olympics. He later represented Hungary at the 1998 Winter Olympics and the 2002 Winter Olympics.
