= Krasimir Videnov =

Bulgarian biathlete (born 1968)

Personal information
- Nationality: Bulgarian
- Born: 15 June 1968 (age 56); Samokov, Bulgaria

Sport
- Sport: Biathlon

Krasimir Videnov (born 15 June 1968) is a Bulgarian biathlete. He competed at the 1988 Winter Olympics, the 1992 Winter Olympics and the 1994 Winter Olympics.
