= Carsten Nentwig =

Austrian bobsledder (born 1966)

Carsten Nentwig (born 31 August 1966 in Düsseldorf, West Germany) is an Austrian bobsledder who competed in the 1990s. Competing in two Winter Olympics, he earned his best finish of sixth in the four-man event at Lillehammer in 1994.
