= Slavcho Batinkov =

Bulgarian skier

- Occupation: Cross-Country Skier

Slavcho Batinkov (Bulgarian: Славчо Батинков) is a former Olympic cross-country skier for the Bulgarian Olympic team. He competed for Bulgaria in cross-country skiing in every Winter Olympics from 1992 through 2002, though he never finished higher than 13th place in any event.
