= Yordan Ivanov (bobsleigh) =

Bulgarian bobsledder

Personal information
- Nationality: Bulgarian
- Born: 16 August 1966 (age 58)

Sport
- Sport: Bobsleigh

Yordan Ivanov (Bulgarian: Йордан Иванов, born 16 August 1966) is a Bulgarian bobsledder. He competed in the four man event at the 1992 Winter Olympics.
