= Constantin-Liviu Cepoi =

Romanian luger (born 1969)

Constantin-Liviu Cepoi (born 25 April 1969) is a Romanian-Moldovan luger who competed from the early 1990s to the early 2000s.

He was born in Broşteni, Drăguşeni, Suceava County.

Competing in four Winter Olympics, he earned his best finish of fourth in the men's doubles event at Albertville in 1992 for Romania and 38th in the men's singles event at Salt Lake City in 2002 for Moldova.

Cepoi was appointed Vice President of Sport for Romania on 11 December 2006.
