= Petar Zografov =

Bulgarian cross-country skier (born 1964)

Personal information
- Nationality: Bulgarian
- Born: 11 July 1964 (age 60); Sofia, Bulgaria

Sport
- Sport: Cross-country skiing

Petar Zografov (born 11 July 1964) is a Bulgarian cross-country skier. He competed at the 1992 Winter Olympics and the 1994 Winter Olympics.
