= Marcantonio Stiffi =

Italian bobsledder (born 1967)

Personal information
- Nationality: Italian
- Born: 26 January 1967 (age 58); Lecce, Italy

Sport
- Sport: Bobsleigh

Marcantonio Stiffi (born 26 January 1967) is an Italian bobsledder. He competed at the 1992 Winter Olympics and the 1994 Winter Olympics.
