= Dimitar Dimitrov (bobsleigh) =

Bulgarian bobsledder (born 1966)

Personal information
- Nationality: Bulgarian
- Born: 27 January 1966 (age 59)

Sport
- Sport: Bobsleigh

Dimitar Dimitrov (Bulgarian: Димитър Димитров, born 27 January 1966) is a Bulgarian bobsledder. He competed in the two man and the four man events at the 1992 Winter Olympics.
