= Emilian Focșeneanu =

Romanian alpine skier (born 1966)

Personal information
- Born: 18 January 1966 (age 60)

Sport
- Sport: Alpine skiing

Emilian Focșeneanu (born 18 January 1966) is a retired Romanian alpine skier. He competed in all five alpine skiing events at the 1992 Winter Olympics with the best result of 23rd place in the combined.
