= Siegrid Pallhuber =

Italian biathlete (born 1970)

Personal information
- Nationality: Italian
- Born: 1 May 1970 (age 54)

Sport
- Sport: Biathlon

Siegrid Pallhuber (born 1 May 1970) is an Italian biathlete. She competed at the 1992 Winter Olympics and the 2002 Winter Olympics.
