= Monica Jauca =

Romanian biathlete (born 1968)

Personal information
- Nationality: Romanian
- Born: 3 September 1968 (age 56)

Sport
- Sport: Biathlon

Monica Jauca (born 3 September 1968) is a Romanian biathlete. She competed two events at the 1992 Winter Olympics.
