= Pasquale Gesuito =

Italian bobsledder (born 1959)

Personal information
- Nationality: Italian
- Born: 13 August 1959 (age 65); Bari, Italy

Sport
- Sport: Bobsleigh

Pasquale Gesuito (born 13 August 1959) is an Italian bobsledder. He competed at the 1984, 1988, 1992, and 1994 Winter Olympics.
