= Thomas Bachler =

Austrian bobsledder

Thomas Bachler (born 3 June 1965 in Schwaz) is an Austrian bobsledder who competed during the 1990s. Competing in three Winter Olympics, he earned his best finish of sixth in the four-man event at Lillehammer in 1994.
