= Erica Carrara =

Italian biathlete (born 1972)

Personal information
- Nationality: Italian
- Born: 29 February 1972 (age 53)

Sport
- Sport: Biathlon

Erica Carrara (born 29 February 1972) is an Italian biathlete. She competed in three events at the 1992 Winter Olympics.
