= David Entwistle =

United States Virgin Islands bobsledder

Personal information
- Nationality: American Virgin Islander
- Born: March 27, 1964 (age 60)

Sport
- Sport: Bobsleigh

David Entwistle (born March 27, 1964) is a bobsledder who represented the United States Virgin Islands. He competed at the 1992 Winter Olympics and the 1994 Winter Olympics.
