= Ileana Ianoșiu-Hangan =

Romanian biathlete (born 1969)

Personal information
- Nationality: Romanian
- Born: 23 January 1969 (age 56)

Sport
- Sport: Biathlon

Ileana Ianoșiu-Hangan (born 23 January 1969) is a Romanian biathlete. She competed at the 1992 Winter Olympics and the 1994 Winter Olympics. She also competed in cross-country skiing at the 1988 Winter Olympics and the 1992 Winter Olympics.
