= Gerhard Rainer =

Austrian bobsledder (born 1961)

Gerhard Rainer (born 19 January 1961 in Innsbruck) is an Austrian bobsledder who competed in the early 1990s. He earned his best finish of eighth in the two-man event at the 1992 Winter Olympics in Albertville.

The following year, Rainer finished sixth in the four-man event at the FIBT World Championships in Igls.

He tested positive for anabolic steroids prior to the start of the 1994 Winter Olympics and was kicked off the Austrian bobsleigh team as a result. Rainer served a two-year suspension.
