= Silvana Blagoeva =

Bulgarian biathlete (born 1972)

Personal information
- Nationality: Bulgarian
- Born: 14 July 1972 (age 52)

Sport
- Sport: Biathlon

Silvana Blagoeva (Bulgarian: Силвана Благоева; born 14 July 1972) is a Bulgarian biathlete. She competed in three events at the 1992 Winter Olympics.
