= Paul Neagu (bobsleigh) =

Romanian bobsledder

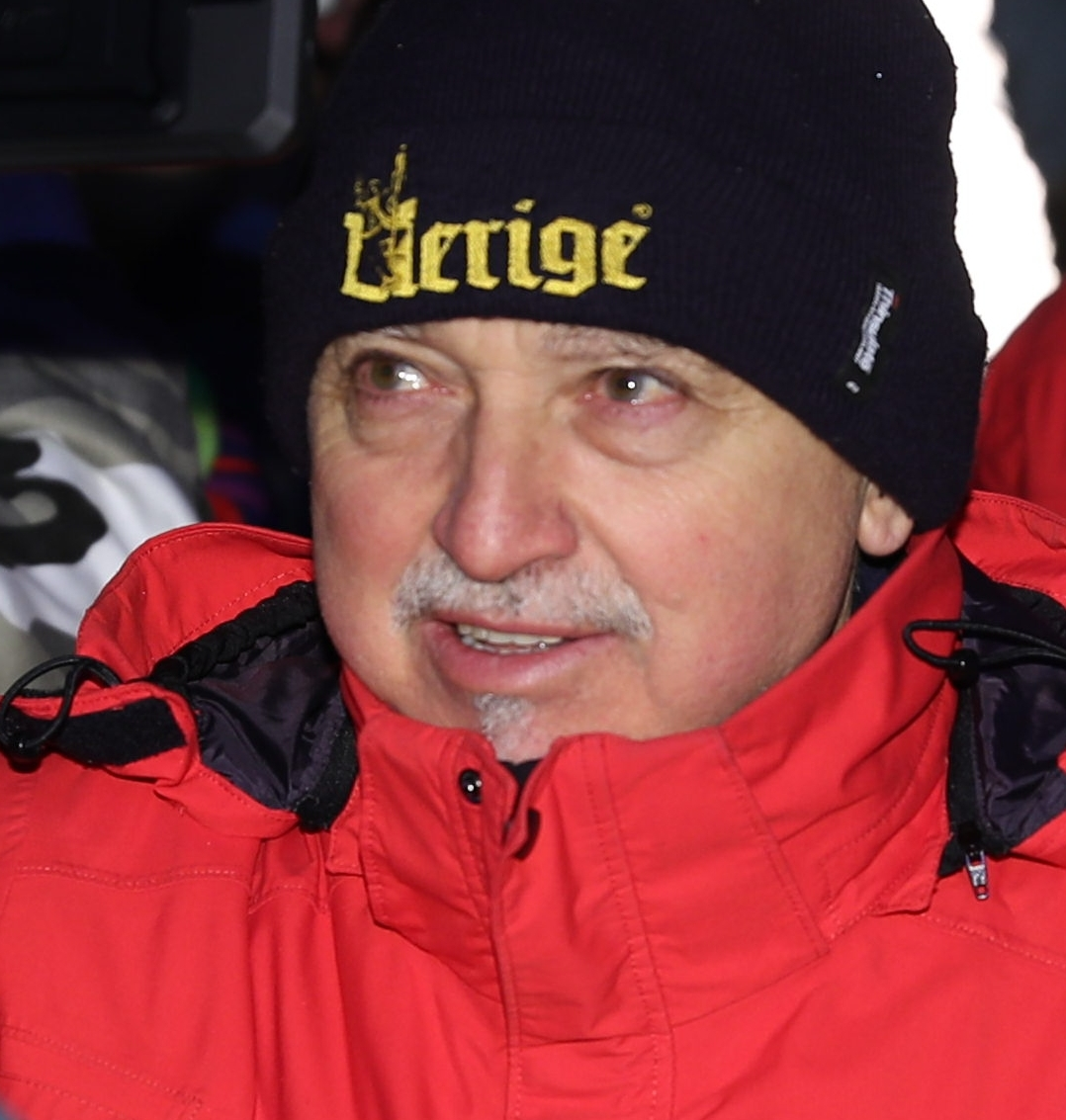

Personal information
- Nationality: Romanian
- Born: 6 June 1954 (age 70); Constanța, Romania

Sport
- Sport: Bobsleigh

Paul Neagu (born 6 June 1954) is a Romanian bobsledder. He competed at the 1976, 1992 and the 1998 Winter Olympics.
