= Nadezhda Aleksieva =

Bulgarian biathlete (born 1969)

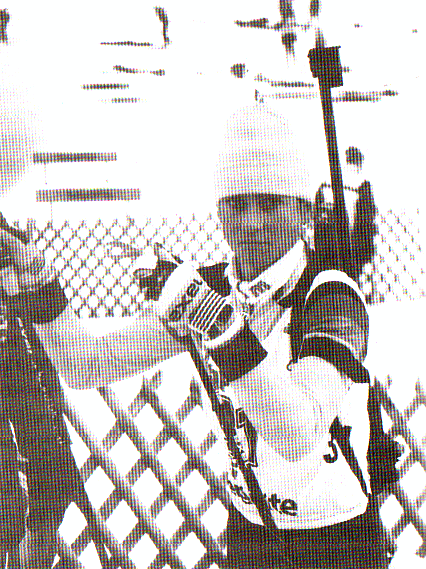

Personal information
- Nationality: Bulgarian
- Born: 14 August 1969 (age 55); Dimitrovgrad, Bulgaria

Sport
- Sport: Biathlon

Nadezhda Aleksieva (Bulgarian: Надежда Алексиева, born 14 August 1969) is a Bulgarian biathlete. She competed at the 1992 Winter Olympics and the 1994 Winter Olympics.
