= Adina Țuțulan-Șotropa =

Romanian biathlete (born 1969)

Personal information
- Nationality: Romanian
- Born: 19 August 1969 (age 55)

Sport
- Sport: Biathlon

Adina Țuțulan-Șotropa (born 19 August 1969) is a Romanian biathlete. She competed at the 1992 Winter Olympics and the 1994 Winter Olympics. She also competed in three cross-country skiing events at the 1988 Winter Olympics.
