= Tsvetozar Viktorov =

Bulgarian bobsledder

Personal information
- Nationality: Bulgarian
- Born: 11 February 1963 (age 62); Kovachevtsi, Bulgaria

Sport
- Sport: Bobsleigh

Tsvetozar Viktorov (Bulgarian: Цветозар Викторов, born 11 February 1963) is a Bulgarian bobsledder. He competed at the 1988, 1992 and the 1994 Winter Olympics.
