= Mihaela Cârstoi =

Romanian skier (born 1970)

Personal information
- Nationality: Romanian
- Born: 24 February 1970 (age 55)

Sport
- Sport: Biathlon

Mihaela Cârstoi (born 24 February 1970) is a Romanian biathlete. She competed at the 1992 Winter Olympics and the 1994 Winter Olympics. She also competed in three cross-country skiing events at the 1988 Winter Olympics.
