= Ingo Appelt =

Austrian bobsledder (born 1961)

Medal record

Men's Bobsleigh

Representing Austria

Olympic Games
Gold medal – first place	1992 Albertville	Four-man

World Championships
Bronze medal – third place	1990 St. Moritz	Four-man

Ingo Appelt (born 11 December 1961 in Innsbruck) is an Austrian bobsledder who competed from the late 1980s to early 1992.

He was Bobsleigh World Cup combined men's champion in 1987–8, and four-man champion in 1987-8 and 1988–9. Competing in two Winter Olympics, Appelt won the gold medal in the four-man event at Albertville in 1992. He also won a bronze medal in the four-man event at the 1990 FIBT World Championships in St. Moritz. Appelt retired from bobsledding at the 1992 games.

Appelt became a Member of Tyrolean Parliament for the Freedom Party of Austria, but meanwhile he works again as a jeweller and jewellery designer in Fulpmes.
