= Cross-country skiing at the 1992 Winter Olympics – Men's 15 kilometre freestyle pursuit =

Men's 15 kilometre freestyle pursuit at the XVI Olympic Winter Games
- Venue: Les Saisies
- Dates: 15 February 1992
- Competitors: 102 from 25 nations
- Winning time: 38:01.9

Medalists
1st place, gold medalist(s)		Bjørn Dæhlie; Norway
2nd place, silver medalist(s)		Vegard Ulvang; Norway
3rd place, bronze medalist(s)		Giorgio Vanzetta; Italy

The men's 15 kilometre freestyle pursuit cross-country skiing competition at the 1992 Winter Olympics in Albertville, France, was held on Saturday 15 February at Les Saisies. This was the first time a pursuit race was held in cross-country skiing at the Winter Olympics.

Each skier started based on the results from the 10 km classical event on 13 February, skiing the entire 15 kilometre course after the first-to-finish principle. Vegard Ulvang won the 10 km classical race with 19.2 seconds to Marco Albarello of Italy. Fourth-placed in the 10 km, Bjørn Dæhlie of Norway took over the lead and won over Ulvang with 53.4 seconds.

== Results ==
Rank	Bib	Name	Country	Start	Time	Deficit
1st place, gold medalist(s)	4	Bjørn Dæhlie	Norway	0:25	38:01.9	
2nd place, silver medalist(s)	1	Vegard Ulvang	Norway	0:00	38:55.3	+53.4
3rd place, bronze medalist(s)	7	Giorgio Vanzetta	Italy	0:50	38:56.2	+54.3
4	2	Marco Albarello	Italy	0:19	38:57.3	+55.4
5	9	Torgny Mogren	Sweden	1:01	39:01.4	+59.5
6	3	Christer Majbäck	Sweden	0:20	39:41.0	+1:39.1
7	10	Silvio Fauner	Italy	1:17	39:58.9	+1:57.0
8	13	Vladimir Smirnov	Unified Team	1:37	39:59.8	+1:57.9
9	12	Henrik Forsberg	Sweden	1:33	40:16.4	+2:14.5
10	8	Alois Stadlober	Austria	0:51	40:21.6	+2:19.7
11	6	Harri Kirvesniemi	Finland	0:47	40:34.4	+2:32.5
12	16	Jari Isometsä	Finland	1:58	40:50.0	+2:48.1
13	5	Niklas Jonsson	Sweden	0:27	41:02.1	+3:00.2
14	17	Václav Korunka	Czechoslovakia	2:07	41:03.5	+3:01.6
15	11	Mikhail Botvinov	Unified Team	1:19	41:07.1	+3:05.2
16	31	Johann Mühlegg	Germany	2:53	41:11.8	+3:09.9
17	30	Andrey Kirillov	Unified Team	2:51	41:14.9	+3:13.0
18	22	Elmo Kassin	Estonia	2:16	41:16.1	+3:14.2
19	15	Jari Räsänen	Finland	1:49	41:29.9	+3:28.0
20	14	Mika Myllylä	Finland	1:41	41:33.1	+3:31.2
21	29	Torald Rein	Germany	2:49	41:48.1	+3:46.2
22	36	Patrick Rémy	France	3:09	42:08.5	+4:06.6
23	32	Janko Neuber	Germany	2:53	42:10.4	+4:08.5
24	35	Andreas Ringhofer	Austria	3:06	42:13.9	+4:12.0
25	33	Radim Nyč	Czechoslovakia	2:55	42:16.0	+4:14.1
26	18	John Aalberg	United States	2:11	42:19.2	+4:17.3
27	19	Alexander Marent	Austria	2:13	42:20.2	+4:18.3
28	34	Markus Gandler	Austria	2:59	42:31.8	+4:29.9
29	27	Hiroyuki Imai	Japan	2:41	42:32.8	+4:30.9
30	51	Philippe Sanchez	France	4:06	42:34.3	+4:32.4
31	49	André Jungen	Switzerland	4:05	42:56.3	+4:54.4
32	23	John Bauer	United States	2:22	43:01.7	+4:59.8
33	41	Pavel Benc	Czechoslovakia	3:37	43:02.0	+5:00.1
34	44	Giachem Guidon	Switzerland	3:47	43:06.1	+5:04.2
35	46	Kazunari Sasaki	Japan	3:55	43:08.6	+5:06.7
36	45	Markus Hasler	Liechtenstein	3:51	43:10.6	+5:08.7
37	39	Juan Jesús Gutiérrez	Spain	3:26	43:17.5	+5:15.6
38	43	Stéphane Azambre	France	3:46	43:26.9	+5:25.0
39	37	Anthony Evans	Australia	3:18	43:29.2	+5:27.3
40	25	Dany Bouchard	Canada	2:27	43:31.1	+5:29.2
41	28	Urmas Välbe	Estonia	2:44	43:38.4	+5:36.5
42	21	Andrus Veerpalu	Estonia	2:15	43:41.7	+5:39.8
43	62	German Karachevsky	Unified Team	4:36	44:09.5	+6:07.6
44	50	Hans Diethelm	Switzerland	4:05	44:16.4	+6:14.5
45	42	Yves Bilodeau	Canada	3:43	44:22.4	+6:20.5
46	26	Benjamin Husaby	United States	2:30	44:41.1	+6:39.2
47	57	Andrzej Piotrowski	Poland	4:20	44:52.9	+6:51.0
48	63	Wiesław Cempa	Poland	4:37	44:53.2	+6:51.3
49	60	John Farra	United States	4:30	44:54.3	+6:52.4
50	54	Ričardas Panavas	Lithuania	4:12	44:54.5	+6:52.6
51	40	Park Byung-chul	South Korea	3:34	45:20.4	+7:18.5
52	52	Al Pilcher	Canada	4:08	45:44.6	+7:42.7
53	48	Ebbe Hartz	Denmark	3:58	45:47.6	+7:45.7
54	72	Viorel Şotropa	Romania	5:21	45:56.4	+7:54.5
55	66	Martin Petrásek	Czechoslovakia	4:51	45:57.1	+7:55.2
56	64	Wayne Dustin	Canada	4:40	46:04.6	+8:02.7
57	61	David Belam	Great Britain	4:32	46:11.0	+8:09.1
58	56	Carles Vicente	Spain	4:20	46:11.4	+8:09.5
59	69	Michael Binzer	Denmark	5:09	46:12.2	+8:10.3
60	67	Taivo Kuus	Estonia	4:52	46:18.6	+8:16.7
61	68	Jordi Ribó	Spain	4:57	46:27.7	+8:25.8
62	71	Jožko Kavalar	Slovenia	5:13	46:36.9	+8:35.0
63	53	Slavcho Batinkov	Bulgaria	4:11	46:41.6	+8:39.7
64	47	John Read	Great Britain	3:56	46:52.4	+8:50.5
65	73	Paul Gray	Australia	5:36	47:08.9	+9:07.0
66	59	Rögnvaldur Ingþórsson	Iceland	4:28	47:48.8	+9:46.9
67	74	Robert Kerštajn	Slovenia	6:01	48:05.3	+10:03.4
68	79	Cédric Vallet	France	6:59	48:10.2	+10:08.3
69	75	Siniša Vukonić	Croatia	6:25	48:45.5	+10:43.6
70	76	Antonio Cascos	Spain	6:42	49:00.8	+10:58.9
71	86	Petar Zografov	Bulgaria	8:06	50:15.6	+12:13.7
72	80	Wu Jintao	China	7:09	51:30.6	+13:28.7
73	89	Son Chol-u	North Korea	8:32	52:35.5	+14:33.6
74	90	Mark Croasdale	Great Britain	8:37	52:36.8	+14:34.9
75	87	Aleksandar Milenković	Yugoslavia	8:11	52:38.8	+14:36.9
76	78	Chang Song-rok	North Korea	6:58	52:43.4	+14:41.5
77	82	Gongoryn Myeryei	Mongolia	7:29	53:11.9	+15:10.0
78	88	Jānis Hermanis	Latvia	8:13	53:12.9	+15:11.0
79	77	An Jin-soo	South Korea	6:50	53:14.2	+15:12.3
80	81	Haukur Eiríksson	Iceland	7:16	53:40.3	+15:38.4
81	85	Kim Kwang-rae	South Korea	7:50	53:51.4	+15:49.5
82	99	Nikos Anastassiadis	Greece	9:50	54:36.2	+16:34.3
83	96	Fikret Ören	Turkey	9:27	54:40.1	+16:38.2
84	83	Ziitsagaany Ganbat	Mongolia	7:34	54:48.4	+16:46.5
85	100	István Oláh Nelu	Hungary	10:01	54:49.2	+16:47.3
86	95	Wi Jae-wook	South Korea	9:17	55:39.1	+17:37.2
87	92	Luis Argel	Argentina	8:57	55:56.0	+17:54.1
88	91	Timoleon Tsourekas	Greece	8:50	56:04.6	+18:02.7
89	101	Bekim Babić	Yugoslavia	10:19	56:34.8	+18:32.9
90	103	Celal Şener	Turkey	10:49	57:47.5	+19:45.6
91	98	Dimitris Tsourekas	Greece	9:39	58:23.9	+20:22.0
92	97	Guillermo Alder	Argentina	9:35	58:33.2	+20:31.3
93	104	Sébastian Menci	Argentina	12:24	1:04:24.0	+26:22.1
94	105	Roberto Alvárez	Mexico	12:52	1:07:38.2	+29:36.3
95	106	Diego Prado	Argentina	14:10	1:09:05.2	+31:03.3
96	107	Mustapha Tourki	Morocco	18:39	1:21:33.1	+43:31.2
97	109	Andrea Sammaritani	San Marino	20:01	1:22:39.4	+44:37.5
98	108	Mohamed Oubahim	Morocco	19:56	1:35:32.2	+57:30.3
99	110	Faissal Cherradi	Morocco	43:31	2:27:37.8	+1:49:35.9
DNF	58	Maurilio De Zolt	Italy	4:24	Did not finish	
DNF	65	Glen Scott	Great Britain	4:44	Did not finish	
DNF	94	Momo Skokić	Yugoslavia	9:12	Did not finish	
DNS	20	Terje Langli	Norway	2:15	Did not start	
DNS	24	Jochen Behle	Germany	2:22	Did not start	
DNS	38	Kristen Skjeldal	Norway	3:26	Did not start	
DNS	55	Ivan Smilenov	Bulgaria	4:18	Did not start	
DNS	70	Iskren Plankov	Bulgaria	5:13	Did not start	
DNS	84	Giannis Mitroulas	Greece	7:49	Did not start	
DNS	93	Mithat Yildrim	Turkey	9:00	Did not start	
DNS	102	Abdullah Yilmaz	Turkey	10:46	Did not start	
