= Cross-country skiing at the 1992 Winter Olympics – Men's 30 kilometre classical =

Men's 30 kilometre classical at the XVI Olympic Winter Games
- Venue: Les Saisies
- Dates: 10 February 1992
- Competitors: 87 from 34 nations
- Winning time: 1:22:27.8

Medalists
1st place, gold medalist(s)		Vegard Ulvang; Norway
2nd place, silver medalist(s)		Bjørn Dæhlie; Norway
3rd place, bronze medalist(s)		Terje Langli; Norway

The men's 30 kilometre classical cross-country skiing competition at the 1992 Winter Olympics in Albertville, France, was held on Monday 10 February in Les Saisies.

Each skier started at half a minute intervals, skiing the entire 30 kilometre course. The Swede Gunde Svan was the 1991 World champion and Alexey Prokurorov of the Soviet Union was the defending Olympic champion from 1988 Olympics in Calgary, Canada. Svan retired in 1991 and did not participate in this event.

== Results ==
Rank	Bib	Name	Country	Time	Deficit
1st place, gold medalist(s)	35	Vegard Ulvang	Norway	1:22:27.8	–
2nd place, silver medalist(s)	63	Bjørn Dæhlie	Norway	1:23:14.0	+46.2
3rd place, bronze medalist(s)	85	Terje Langli	Norway	1:23:42.5	+1:14.7
4	38	Marco Albarello	Italy	1:23:55.7	+1:27.9
5	16	Erling Jevne	Norway	1:24:07.7	+1:39.9
6	84	Christer Majbäck	Sweden	1:24:12.1	+1:44.3
7	65	Niklas Jonsson	Sweden	1:25:17.6	+2:49.8
8	4	Jyrki Ponsiluoma	Sweden	1:25:24.4	+2:56.6
9	83	Vladimir Smirnov	Unified Team	1:25:27.6	+2:59.8
10	77	Harri Kirvesniemi	Finland	1:25:28.5	+3:00.7
11	53	Jan Ottosson	Sweden	1:25:33.9	+3:06.1
12	42	Mikhail Botvinov	Unified Team	1:25:36.9	+3:09.1
13	87	Lubomír Buchta	Czechoslovakia	1:25:40.6	+3:12.8
14	13	Aleksandr Golubyov	Unified Team	1:25:56.1	+3:28.3
15	86	Jochen Behle	Germany	1:25:59.8	+3:32.0
16	81	Giuseppe Pulie	Italy	1:26:02.4	+3:34.6
17	3	Fulvio Valbusa	Italy	1:26:07.1	+3:39.3
18	52	Jiří Teplý	Czechoslovakia	1:26:14.4	+3:46.6
19	45	Alois Stadlober	Austria	1:26:22.7	+3:54.9
20	69	Gianfranco Polvara	Italy	1:27:26.2	+3:58.4
21	76	Alexey Prokurorov	Unified Team	1:27:20.5	+4:52.7
22	1	Alexander Marent	Austria	1:27:34.4	+5:06.6
23	64	Patrick Rémy	France	1:27:54.0	+5:26.2
24	62	Martin Petrásek	Czechoslovakia	1:28:30.8	+6:03.0
25	66	Giachem Guidon	Switzerland	1:28:44.5	+6:16.7
26	50	Mika Kuusisto	Finland	1:28:45.6	+6:17.8
27	9	Luke Bodensteiner	United States	1:28:45.7	+6:17.9
28	55	Holger Bauroth	Germany	1:28:58.1	+6:30.3
29	59	Alois Schwarz	Austria	1:29:01.6	+6:33.8
30	37	Torald Rein	Germany	1:29:08.5	+6:40.7
31	30	Jaanus Teppan	Estonia	1:29:30.9	+7:03.1
32	57	Hiroyuki Imai	Japan	1:29:35.6	+7:07.8
33	71	Urmas Välbe	Estonia	1:29:44.3	+7:16.5
34	74	Mika Myllylä	Finland	1:30:08.8	+7:41.0
35	19	Viorel Şotropa	Romania	1:30:10.5	+7:42.7
36	26	Hans Diethelm	Switzerland	1:30:13.2	+7:45.4
37	36	Guy Balland	France	1:30:19.6	+7:51.8
38	22	Seppo Rantanen	Finland	1:30:25.6	+7:57.8
39	82	Martin Standmann	Austria	1:30:27.7	+7:59.9
40	41	Kazunari Sasaki	Japan	1:30:35.9	+8:08.1
41	58	Ricardas Panavas	Lithuania	1:30:38.0	+8:10.2
42	75	Bill Koch	United States	1:30:41.6	+8:13.8
43	61	Markus Hasler	Liechtenstein	1:31:03.3	+8:35.5
44	5	Andrus Veerpalu	Estonia	1:31:06.1	+8:38.3
45	89	Al Pilcher	Canada	1:31:49.3	+9:21.5
46	28	Jordi Ribó	Spain	1:31:52.4	+9:24.6
47	20	Janko Neuber	Germany	1:31:57.8	+9:30.0
48	54	Wayne Dustin	Canada	1:31:58.2	+9:30.4
49	80	John Callahan	United States	1:32:07.9	+9:40.1
50	10	Robert Kerštajn	Slovenia	1:32:17.6	+9:49.8
51	46	Pete Vordenberg	United States	1:32:24.7	+9:56.9
52	29	Wiesław Cempa	Poland	1:32:25.4	+9:57.6
53	60	Ivan Smilenov	Bulgaria	1:32:25.5	+9:57.7
54	48	Anthony Evans	Australia	1:32:29.9	+10:02.1
55	72	Park Byung-chul	South Korea	1:33:01.8	+10:34.0
56	79	David Belam	Great Britain	1:33:15.6	+10:47.8
57	68	Carles Vicente	Spain	1:33:33.3	+11:05.5
58	44	Ebbe Hartz	Denmark	1:33:46.4	+11:18.6
59	17	Yves Bilodeau	Canada	1:34:18.3	+11:50.5
60	27	Alain Masson	Canada	1:34:22.0	+11:54.2
61	73	Andrzej Piotrowski	Poland	1:34:32.9	+12:05.1
62	56	John Read	Great Britain	1:34:37.5	+12:09.7
63	12	Slavcho Batinkov	Bulgaria	1:34:39.2	+12:11.4
64	23	Michael Binzer	Denmark	1:35:00.1	+12:32.3
65	40	Jožko Kavalar	Slovenia	1:35:16.3	+12:48.5
66	7	Glen Scott	Great Britain	1:36:06.0	+13:38.2
67	25	Iskren Plankov	Bulgaria	1:36:58.2	+14:30.4
68	43	Wu Jintao	China	1:38:54.5	+16:26.7
69	49	Rögnvaldur Ingþórsson	Iceland	1:39:23.9	+16:56.1
70	47	An Jin-soo	South Korea	1:40:24.7	+17:56.9
71	88	Kim Kwang-rae	South Korea	1:41:34.4	+19:06.6
72	31	Chang Song-Rok	North Korea	1:42:23.4	+19:55.6
73	8	Gongoryn Myeryei	Mongolia	1:42:33.1	+20:05.3
74	67	Giannis Mitroulas	Greece	1:42:50.5	+20:22.7
75	14	Son Chol-U	North Korea	1:43:14.9	+20:47.1
76	11	Dimitris Tsourekas	Greece	1:43:41.9	+21:14.1
77	2	Jānis Hermanis	Latvia	1:44:43.2	+22:15.4
78	32	Ziitsagaany Ganbat	Mongolia	1:44:45.6	+22:17.8
79	21	Guillermo Alder	Argentina	1:47:07.4	+24:39.6
80	70	Aleksandar Milenković	Yugoslavia	1:57:57.4	+35:29.6
81	15	Roberto Alvárez	Mexico	2:01:28.1	+39:00.3
82	33	Bekim Babić	Yugoslavia	2:06:09.4	+43:41.6
	6	Nikos Anastassiadis	Greece	DNF	
	18	Haukur Eiríksson	Iceland	DNF	
	24	Wi Jae-wook	South Korea	DNF	
	34	Luis Argel Mancilla	Argentina	DNF	
	78	Momo Skokić	Yugoslavia	DNF	
	—	Mark Croasdale	Great Britain	DNS	
	—	Timoleon Tsourekas	Greece	DNS	
