= Cross-country skiing at the 1992 Winter Olympics – Men's 50 kilometre freestyle =

Men's 50 kilometre freestyle at the XVI Olympic Winter Games
- Venue: Les Saisies
- Dates: 22 February 1992
- Competitors: 74 from 29 nations
- Winning time: 2:03:41.5

Medalists
1st place, gold medalist(s)		Bjørn Dæhlie; Norway
2nd place, silver medalist(s)		Maurilio De Zolt; Italy
3rd place, bronze medalist(s)		Giorgio Vanzetta; Italy

The men's 50 kilometre freestyle cross-country skiing competition at the 1992 Winter Olympics in Albertville, France, was held on 22 February in Les Saisies.

Each skier started at half a minute intervals, skiing the entire 50 kilometre course. The Swede Torgny Mogren was the 1991 World champion and Gunde Svan was the defending Olympic champion from 1988 Olympics in Calgary, Canada. Svan retired in 1991 and did not participate in this event.

== Results ==
Rank	Bib	Name	Country	Time	Deficit
1st place, gold medalist(s)	79	Bjørn Dæhlie	Norway	2:03:41.5	–
2nd place, silver medalist(s)	66	Maurilio De Zolt	Italy	2:04:39.1	+57.6
3rd place, bronze medalist(s)	58	Giorgio Vanzetta	Italy	2:06:42.1	+3:00.6
4	16	Alexey Prokourorov	Unified Team	2:07:06.1	+3:24.6
5	73	Hervé Balland	France	2:07:17.7	+3:36.2
6	15	Radim Nyč	Czechoslovakia	2:07:41.5	+4:00.0
7	64	Johann Mühlegg	Germany	2:07:45.2	+4:03.7
8	48	Pavel Benc	Czechoslovakia	2:08:13.6	+4:26.3
9	62	Vegard Ulvang	Norway	2:08:21.5	+4:40.0
10	32	Gianfranco Polvara	Italy	2:09:27.8	+5:34.7
11	14	Alfredo Runggaldier	Italy	2:09:27.8	+6:21.6
12	76	Torgny Mogren	Sweden	2:10:29.9	+6:48.4
13	77	Václav Korunka	Czechoslovakia	2:10:30.7	+6:49.2
14	49	Guy Balland	France	2:10:40.8	+6:59.3
15	72	Giachem Guidon	Switzerland	2:10:55.0	+7:13.5
16	27	Christer Majbäck	Sweden	2:11:13.3	+7:31.8
17	23	Alexander Golubyov	Unified Team	2:11:20.1	+7:38.6
18	2	Terje Langli	Norway	2:11:32.0	+7:50.5
19	75	Juan Jesús Gutiérrez	Spain	2:11:42.1	+8:00.6
20	26	Kristen Skjeldal	Norway	2:11:44.5	+8:03.0
21	19	Jiří Teplý	Czechoslovakia	2:12:00.2	+8:18.7
22	59	Jari Isometsä	Finland	2:12:03.5	+8:22.0
23	18	Mika Kuusisto	Finland	2:13:09.3	+9:27.8
24	46	Jose Kavalar	Slovenia	2:13:17.9	+9:36.4
25	47	Hiroyuki Imai	Japan	2:13:33.0	+9:51.5
26	5	Stéphane Azambre	France	2:13:49.8	+10:08.3
26	43	Holger Bauroth	Germany	2:13:49.8	+10:08.3
28	57	Mikhail Botvinov	Unified Team	2:14:20.8	+10:39.3
29	33	Janko Neuber	Germany	2:14:37.1	+10:55.6
30	21	Hans Diethelm	Switzerland	2:14:41.6	+11:00.1
31	24	Jari Räsänen	Finland	2:14:53.6	+11:12.1
32	51	Wiesław Cempa	Poland	2:15:06.7	+11:25.2
33	45	John Aalberg	United States	2:15:33.5	+11:52.0
34	52	Anthony Evans	Australia	2:15:46.9	+12:05.4
35	63	Vladimir Smirnov	Unified Team	2:15:48.5	+12:07.0
36	12	Viorel Sotropa	Romania	2:16:03.5	+12:22.0
37	17	Henrik Forsberg	Sweden	2:16:22.7	+12:41.2
38	42	Jordi Ribo	Spain	2:16:58.8	+13:17.3
39	44	Jaanus Teppan	Estonia	2:17:15.1	+13:33.6
40	78	Kazunari Sasaki	Japan	2:17:20.1	+13:38.6
41	61	Markus Gandler	Austria	2:17:21.8	+13:40.3
42	3	Andreas Ringhofer	Austria	2:18:00.4	+14:18.9
43	36	Luke Bodensteiner	United States	2:18:42.4	+15:00.9
44	50	Jan Ottosson	Sweden	2:18:59.9	+15:18.4
45	68	Elmo Kassin	Estonia	2:19:29.3	+15:47.8
46	71	Wayne Dustin	Canada	2:20:24.6	+16:43.1
47	54	Andre Jungen	Switzerland	2:20:32.1	+16:50.6
48	28	Andrzej Piotrowski	Poland	2:20:32.9	+16:51.4
49	55	Ebbe Hartz	Denmark	2:21:23.1	+17:41.6
50	22	Petar Zografov	Bulgaria	2:22:20.8	+18:39.3
51	56	Antonio Cascos	Spain	2:22:59.0	+19:17.5
52	67	Martin Standmann	Austria	2:24:19.6	+20:38.1
53	4	David Belam	Great Britain	2:24:54.3	+21:12.8
54	37	Rögnvaldur Ingþórsson	Iceland	2:25:16.9	+21:35.4
55	25	Paul Gray	Australia	2:25:29.0	+21:47.5
56	69	Jim Curran	United States	2:26:17.0	+22:35.5
57	7	Pete Vordenberg	United States	2:26:25.8	+22:44.3
58	34	Robert Kerštajn	Slovenia	2:26:26.3	+22:44.8
59	11	Spas Zlatev	Bulgaria	2:28:07.1	+24:25.6
60	35	Siniša Vukonić	Croatia	2:28:19.4	+24:37.9
61	60	Darren Derochie	Canada	2:29:42.0	+26:00.5
62	10	Jintao Wu	China	2:29:59.7	+26:18.2
63	53	Glen Scott	Great Britain	2:31:40.6	+27:59.1
64	9	Gongoryn Merei	Mongolia	2:32:27.2	+28:45.7
65	1	Aleksandar Milenković	Yugoslavia	2:34:31.1	+30:49.6
66	4	Jānis Hermanis	Latvia	2:37:24.3	+33:42.8
67	13	Roberto Alvárez	Mexico	3:09:04.7	+1:05:23.2
	30	Mark Croasdale	Great Britain	DNF	
	70	Jukka Hartonen	Finland	DNF	
	41	Taivo Kuus	Estonia	DNF	
	31	Alexander Marent	Austria	DNF	
	38	Alain Masson	Canada	DNF	
	40	Momo Skokić	Yugoslavia	DNF	
		Guillermo Alder	Argentina	DNS	
	—	Michael Binzer	Denmark	DNS	
	—	Zidtsagaany Ganbat	Mongolia	DNS	
	—	Luis Argel Mancilla	Argentina	DNS	
	—	John Read	Great Britain	DNS	
	—	Patrick Rémy	France	DNS	
