= Cross-country skiing at the 1992 Winter Olympics – Men's 10 kilometre classical =

Men's 10 kilometre classical at the XVI Olympic Winter Games
- Venue: Les Saisies
- Dates: 13 February 1992
- Competitors: 110 from 39 nations
- Winning time: 27:36.0

Medalists
1st place, gold medalist(s)		Vegard Ulvang	Norway
2nd place, silver medalist(s)		Marco Albarello	Italy
3rd place, bronze medalist(s)		Christer Majbäck	Sweden

The men's 10 kilometre classical cross-country skiing competition at the 1992 Winter Olympics in Albertville, France, was held on Thursday 13 February at Les Saisies. Each skier started at half a minute intervals, skiing the entire 10 kilometre course. The Norwegian Terje Langli was the 1991 World champion. Men's 10 kilometre classical was not a part of the 1988 Winter Olympics in Calgary, Canada.

== Results ==
Rank	Bib	Name	Country	Time	Deficit
1st place, gold medalist(s)	105	Vegard Ulvang	Norway	27:36.0	—
2nd place, silver medalist(s)	93	Marco Albarello	Italy	27:55.2	+19.2
3rd place, bronze medalist(s)	88	Christer Majbäck	Sweden	27:56.4	+20.4
4	73	Bjørn Dæhlie	Norway	28:01.6	+25.6
5	31	Niklas Jonsson	Sweden	28:03.1	+27.1
6	102	Harri Kirvesniemi	Finland	28:23.3	+47.3
7	25	Giorgio Vanzetta	Italy	28:26.9	+50.9
8	84	Alois Stadlober	Austria	28:27.5	+51.5
9	103	Torgny Mogren	Sweden	28:37.8	+1:01.8
10	76	Silvio Fauner	Italy	28:53.8	+1:17.8
11	97	Mikhail Botvinov	Unified Team	28:55.8	+1:19.8
12	22	Henrik Forsberg	Sweden	29:09.0	+1:33.0
13	83	Vladimir Smirnov	Unified Team	29:13.1	+1:37.1
14	18	Mika Myllylä	Finland	29:17.0	+1:41.0
15	80	Jari Räsänen	Finland	29:25.2	+1:49.2
16	35	Jari Isometsä	Finland	29:34.4	+1:58.4
17	77	Václav Korunka	Czechoslovakia	29:43.4	+2:07.4
18	86	John Aalberg	United States	29:47.6	+2:11.6
19	91	Alexander Marent	Austria	29:49.9	+2:13.9
20	30	Terje Langli	Norway	29:51.0	+2:15.0
21	39	Andrus Veerpalu	Estonia	29:51.5	+2:15.5
22	94	Elmo Kassin	Estonia	29:52.0	+2:16.0
23	90	John Bauer	United States	29:58.0	+2:22.0
24	61	Jochen Behle	Germany	29:58.2	+2:22.2
25	58	Dany Bouchard	Canada	30:03.8	+2:27.8
26	59	Benjamin Husaby	United States	30:06.0	+2:30.0
27	33	Hiroyuki Imai	Japan	30:17.3	+2:41.3
28	68	Urmas Välbe	Estonia	30:20.1	+2:44.1
29	17	Torald Rein	Germany	30:25.1	+2:49.1
30	28	Andrey Kirillov	Unified Team	30:27.4	+2:51.4
31	43	Johann Mühlegg	Germany	30:29.4	+2:53.4
32	104	Janko Neuber	Germany	30:29.8	+2:53.8
33	108	Radim Nyč	Czechoslovakia	30:31.5	+2:55.5
34	29	Markus Gandler	Austria	30:35.9	+2:59.9
35	23	Andreas Ringhofer	Austria	30:42.5	+3:06.5
36	99	Patrick Rémy	France	30:45.1	+3:09.1
37	79	Anthony Evans	Australia	30:54.2	+3:18.2
38	3	Kristen Skjeldal	Norway	31:02.0	+3:26.0
39	92	Juan Jesús Gutiérrez	Spain	31:02.6	+3:26.6
40	63	Park Byung-chul	South Korea	31:10.0	+3:34.0
41	36	Pavel Benc	Czechoslovakia	31:13.6	+3:37.6
42	98	Yves Bilodeau	Canada	31:19.5	+3:43.5
43	51	Stéphane Azambre	France	31:22.2	+3:46.2
44	100	Giachem Guidon	Switzerland	31:23.9	+3:47.9
45	75	Markus Hasler	Liechtenstein	31:27.0	+3:51.0
46	69	Kazunari Sasaki	Japan	31:31.4	+3:55.4
47	107	John Read	Great Britain	31:32.7	+3:56.7
48	64	Ebbe Hartz	Denmark	31:34.5	+3:58.5
49	72	André Jungen	Switzerland	31:41.2	+4:05.2
50	87	Hans Diethelm	Switzerland	31:41.8	+4:05.8
51	78	Philippe Sanchez	France	31:42.3	+4:06.3
52	95	Al Pilcher	Canada	31:44.8	+4:08.8
53	71	Slavcho Batinkov	Bulgaria	31:47.4	+4:11.4
54	70	Ričardas Panavas	Lithuania	31:48.9	+4:12.9
55	66	Ivan Smilenov	Bulgaria	31:54.7	+4:18.7
56	95	Carles Vicente	Spain	31:56.2	+4:20.2
57	46	Andrzej Piotrowski	Poland	31:56.9	+4:20.9
58	40	Maurilio De Zolt	Italy	32:00.1	+4:24.1
59	62	Rögnvaldur Ingþórsson	Iceland	32:04.6	+4:28.6
60	2	John Farra	United States	32:06.0	+4:30.0
61	55	David Belam	Great Britain	32:08.9	+4:32.9
62	10	German Karachevsky	Unified Team	32:13.6	+4:37.6
63	89	Wiesław Cempa	Poland	32:13.9	+4:37.9
64	14	Wayne Dustin	Canada	32:16.9	+4:40.9
65	67	Glenn Scott	Great Britain	32:20.8	+4:44.8
66	26	Martin Petrásek	Czechoslovakia	32:27.4	+4:51.4
67	5	Taivo Kuus	Estonia	32:28.0	+4:52.0
68	38	Jordi Ribó	Spain	32:33.9	+4:57.9
69	56	Michael Binzer	Denmark	32:45.9	+5:09.9
70	32	Iskren Plankov	Bulgaria	32:49.2	+5:13.2
71	85	Jožko Kavalar	Slovenia	32:49.6	+5:13.6
72	34	Viorel Şotropa	Romania	32:57.5	+5:21.5
73	57	Paul Gray	Australia	33:12.2	+5:36.2
74	27	Robert Kerštajn	Slovenia	33:37.5	+6:01.5
75	37	Siniša Vukonić	Croatia	34:01.1	+6:25.1
76	11	Antonio Cascos	Spain	34:18.5	+6:42.5
77	52	An Jin-soo	South Korea	34:26.4	+6:50.4
78	42	Chang Song-rok	North Korea	34:34.9	+6:58.9
79	21	Cédric Vallet	France	34:35.1	+6:59.1
80	45	Wu Jintao	China	34:45.9	+7:09.9
81	53	Haukur Eiríksson	Iceland	34:52.6	+7:16.6
82	60	Gongoryn Myeryei	Mongolia	35:05.9	+7:29.9
83	16	Ziitsagaany Ganbat	Mongolia	35:10.3	+7:34.3
84	65	Ioannis Mitroulas	Greece	35:25.4	+7:49.4
85	15	Kim Kwang-rae	South Korea	35:26.8	+7:50.8
86	20	Petar Zografov	Bulgaria	35:42.2	+8:06.2
87	74	Aleksandar Milenković	Yugoslavia	35:47.0	+8:11.0
88	8	Jānis Hermanis	Latvia	35:49.8	+8:13.8
89	1	Son Chol-u	North Korea	36:08.6	+8:32.6
90	4	Mark Croasdale	Great Britain	36:13.0	+8:37.0
91	44	Timoleon Tsourekas	Greece	36:26.9	+8:50.9
92	96	Luis Argel	Argentina	36:33.6	+8:57.6
93	54	Mithat Yildrim	Turkey	36:36.8	+9:00.8
94	24	Momo Skokić	Yugoslavia	36:48.4	+9:12.4
95	106	Wi Jae-wook	South Korea	36:53.7	+9:17.7
96	109	Fikret Ören	Turkey	37:03.7	+9:27.7
97	81	Guillermo Alder	Argentina	37:11.8	+9:35.8
98	12	Dimitris Tsourekas	Greece	37:15.6	+9:39.6
99	101	Nikos Anastassiadis	Greece	37:26.5	+9:50.5
100	6	István Oláh Nelu	Hungary	37:37.7	+10:01.7
101	50	Bekim Babić	Yugoslavia	37:55.9	+10:19.9
102	7	Abdullah Yılmaz	Turkey	38:22.1	+10:46.1
103	110	Celal Şener	Turkey	38:25.4	+10:49.4
104	48	Sébastian Menci	Argentina	40:00.2	+12:24.2
105	41	Roberto Alvárez	Mexico	40:28.5	+12:52.5
106	9	Diego Prado	Argentina	41:46.2	+14:10.2
107	82	Mustapha Tourki	Morocco	46:15.1	+18:39.1
108	13	Mohamed Oubahim	Morocco	47:32.6	+19:56.6
109	19	Andrea Sammaritani	San Marino	47:37.8	+20:01.8
110	47	Faissal Cherradi	Morocco	1:11:07.4	+43:31.4
