= Cross-country skiing at the 1992 Winter Olympics – Men's 4 × 10 kilometre relay =

Men's 4 × 10 kilometre relay at the XVI Olympic Winter Games
- Pictogram for cross country
- Venue: Les Saisies
- Dates: 18 February 1992
- Competitors: 64 (16 teams) from 16 nations
- Winning time: 1:39:26.0

Medalists
| 1st place, gold medalist(s) | | Terje Langli; Vegard Ulvang; Kristen Skjeldal; Bjørn Dæhlie; Norway |
| 2nd place, silver medalist(s) | | Giuseppe Pulie; Marco Albarello; Giorgio Vanzetta; Silvio Fauner; Italy |
| 3rd place, bronze medalist(s) | | Mika Kuusisto; Harri Kirvesniemi; Jari Räsänen; Jari Isometsä; Finland |

The men's 4 × 10 km relay cross-country skiing competition at the 1992 Winter Olympics in Albertville, France, took place on 18 February at Les Saisies. The race saw Norway beat Italy by 1 minute 26.7 seconds, with Finland finishing third.

== Results ==
| Rank | Bib | Country | Time | Deficit |
|---|---|---|---|---|
| 1st place, gold medalist(s) | 1 | Norway; Terje Langli; Vegard Ulvang; Kristen Skjeldal; Bjørn Dæhlie | 1:39:26.0 | – |
| 2nd place, silver medalist(s) | 4 | Italy; Giuseppe Pulie; Marco Albarello; Giorgio Vanzetta; Silvio Fauner | 1:40:52.7 | +1:26.7 |
| 3rd place, bronze medalist(s) | 3 | Finland; Mika Kuusisto; Harri Kirvesniemi; Jari Räsänen; Jari Isometsä | 1:41:22.9 | +1:56.9 |
| 4 | 2 | Sweden; Jan Ottosson; Christer Majbäck; Henrik Forsberg; Torgny Mogren | 1:41:23.1 | +1:57.1 |
| 5 | 5 | Unified Team; Andrey Kirillov; Vladimir Smirnov; Mikhail Botvinov; Alexey Prokurorov | 1:43:03.6 | +3:37.6 |
| 6 | 9 | Germany; Holger Bauroth; Jochen Behle; Torald Rein; Johann Mühlegg | 1:43:41.7 | +4:15.7 |
| 7 | 7 | Czechoslovakia; Radim Nyč; Lubomír Buchta; Pavel Benc; Václav Korunka | 1:44:20.0 | +4:54.0 |
| 8 | 8 | France; Patrick Rémy; Philippe Sanchez; Stéphane Azambre; Hervé Balland | 1:44:51.1 | +5:25.1 |
| 9 | 6 | Austria; Alois Schwarz; Alois Stadlober; Alexander Marent; Andreas Ringhofer | 1:45:56.6 | +6:30.6 |
| 10 | 16 | Estonia; Andrus Veerpalu; Jaanus Teppan; Elmo Kassin; Urmas Välbe | 1:46:33.3 | +7:07.3 |
| 11 | 10 | Canada; Dany Bouchard; Wayne Dustin; Yves Bilodeau; Darren Derochie | 1:47:52.0 | +8:26.0 |
| 12 | 11 | United States; John Aalberg; Benjamin Husaby; John Bauer; Luke Bodensteiner | 1:48:15.8 | +8:49.8 |
| 13 | 13 | Bulgaria; Ivan Smilenov; Iskren Plankov; Petar Zografov; Slavcho Batinkov | 1:51:28.0 | +12:02.0 |
| 14 | 12 | Spain; Jordi Ribó; Carles Vicente; Antonio Cascos; Juan Jesús Gutiérrez | 1:52:05.3 | +12:39.3 |
| 15 | 14 | South Korea; Park Byung-chul; An Jin-soo; Wi Jae-wook; Kim Kwang-rae | 2:01:01.4 | +21:35.4 |
| 16 | 13 | Greece; Dimitris Tsourekas; Timoleon Tsourekas; Nikos Anastassiadis; Athanasios Tsakiris | 2:05:46.4 | +26:20.4 |
