= Slovenia at the 1992 Winter Olympics =

- IOC code: SLO
- NOC: Olympic Committee of Slovenia
- Website: www.olympic.si (in Slovene and English)

in Albertville
- Competitors: 27 (20 men, 7 women) in 6 sports
- Flag bearer: Franci Petek (ski jumping)
- Medals: Gold 0 Silver 0 Bronze 0 Total 0

Winter Olympics appearances (overview)
- 1992; 1994; 1998; 2002; 2006; 2010; 2014; 2018; 2022; 2026

Other related appearances
- Yugoslavia (1924–1988)

Slovenia participated at the 1992 Winter Olympics in Albertville, France, held between 8 and 23 February 1992. The country's participation in the Games marked its first appearance at the Winter Olympics after its independence from Yugoslavia.

The Slovenian team consisted of 27 athletes who competed across six sports. Franci Petek served as the country's flag-bearer during the opening ceremony. Slovenia did not win any medals in the Games.

== Background ==
Slovenian athletes competed as a part of Yugoslavia till 1988. The National Olympic Committee of Slovenia was founded on 15 October 1991. The Olympic Committee of Slovenia was provisionally granted approval by the International Olympic Committee (IOC) on 17 January 1992 and was fully recognized on 5 February 1992. The 1992 Winter Olympics marked Slovenia's first participation in the Winter Olympics.

The 1992 Winter Olympics were held in Albertville, France between 8 and 23 February 1992. The Slovenian team consisted of 27 athletes who competed across six sports. Franci Petek served as the country's flag-bearer during the opening ceremony. Slovenia did not win any medals in the Games.

== Competitors ==
The Slovenian team consisted of 27 athletes including seven women who competed across six sports.

Sport	Men	Women	Total
Alpine skiing	5	6	11
Biathlon	5	0	5
Cross-country skiing	2	0	2
Figure skating	1	1	2
Freestyle skiing	2	0	2
Ski jumping	5	0	5
Total	20	7	27

== Alpine skiing ==
Alpine skiing competitions for men were held at Val d’Isère and Les Menuires while the women's competitions were held at Méribel. Eleven athletes including six women participated across the eight events in alpine skiing. In the men's individual events, only Gregor Grilc in giant slalom, and Andrej Miklavc and Jure Košir in the slalom events recorded top 20 finishes. In the women's events, Urška Hrovat was ranked 10th in the slalom event, while Nataša Bokal and Katjuša Pušnik finished in the giant slalom and slalom top 20 in the events respectively.

Men

Athlete	Event	Race 1	Race 2	Total	
Athlete	Event	Time	Time	Time	Rank
Gregor Grilc	Super-G	—N/a		1:15.71	20
Jure Košir	Super-G	—N/a		1:16.56	29
Mitja Kunc	Super-G	—N/a		1:16.49	27
Andrej Miklavc	Giant slalom	1:07.91	1:05.04	2:12.95	24
Gregor Grilc	Giant slalom	1:06.80	1:04.70	2:11.50	16
Jure Košir	Giant slalom	1:07.41	1:04.82	2:12.23	22
Mitja Kunc	Giant slalom	1:07.48	1:05.40	2:12.88	23
Andrej Miklavc	Slalom	55.02	54.45	1:49.47	17
Gregor Grilc	Slalom	54.73	55.22	1:49.95	22
Jure Košir	Slalom	54.88	54.61	1:49.49	19
Klemen Bergant	Slalom	56.27	56.25	1:52.52	24

Athlete	Event	Downhill	Slalom		Total	
Athlete	Event	Time	Time 1	Time 2	Points	Rank
Jure Košir	Combined	1:49.60	51.32	51.95	59.78	13

Women

Athlete	Event	Race 1	Race 2	Total	
Athlete	Event	Time	Time	Time	Rank
Barbara Brlec	Super-G	—N/a		DNF	–
Nataša Bokal	Super-G	—N/a		1:27.42	32
Špela Pretnar	Super-G	—N/a		DNF	–
Urška Hrovat	Super-G	—N/a		DNF	–
Barbara Brlec	Giant slalom	1:09.50	DNF	DNF	–
Katjuša Pušnik	Giant slalom	1:08.99	DNF	DNF	–
Nataša Bokal	Giant slalom	1:07.20	1:08.44	2:15.64	13
Špela Pretnar	Giant slalom	DNF	–	DNF	–
Katjuša Pušnik	Slalom	50.06	46.39	1:36.45	16
Nataša Bokal	Slalom	48.62	DNF	DNF	–
Urška Hrovat	Slalom	49.04	45.46	1:34.50	10
Veronika Šarec	Slalom	DNF	–	DNF	–

Athlete	Event	Downhill	Slalom		Total	
Athlete	Event	Time	Time 1	Time 2	Points	Rank
Nataša Bokal	Combined	1:29.02	35.05	34.60	42.60	7

== Biathlon ==
Biathlon competitions were held at Les Saisies between 9 and 11 February. Five Slovenian athletes participated across the five events in biathlon. The biathlon events consisted of a skiing a specific course multiple times depending on the length of the competition, with intermediate shooting at various positions. For every shot missed, a penalty of one minute is applied in individual events, and the participant is required to ski through a penalty loop in sprint events. Sašo Grajf and Boštjan Lekan registered the best finish amongst the Slovenians in the men's sprint and individual events respectively.

Athlete	Event	Time	Misses ^{1}	Adjusted Time ^{2}	Rank
Boštjan Lekan	Men's 10 km sprint	28:42.4	1	—N/a	51
Janez Ožbolt	Men's 10 km sprint	28:31.1	0	—N/a	43
Sašo Grajf	Men's 10 km sprint	27:58.8	0	—N/a	33
Uroš Velepec	Men's 10 km sprint	29:54.3	2	—N/a	68
Boštjan Lekan	Men's 20 km	59:26.8	1	1'00:26.8	21
Janez Ožbolt	Men's 20 km	1'00:47.2	1	1'01:47.2	33
Jure Velepec	Men's 20 km	1'02:12.6	2	1'04:12.6	56
Sašo Grajf	Men's 20 km	57:39.2	3	1'00:39.2	24
Boštjan Lekan; Janez Ožbolt; Jure Velepec; Uroš Velepec	Men's relay	1'39:03.2	6	—N/a	20

^{1} A penalty loop of 150 metres had to be skied per missed target.
^{2} One minute added per missed target.

== Cross-country skiing ==
Cross-country skiing events were held between 9 and 22 February at Les Saisies. Jožko Kavalar and Robert Kerštajn represented the nation, and competed in four events. Kavalar achieved a best place finish of 24th in the Men's 50 km freestyle event.

Event	Athlete	Race	
Event	Athlete	Time	Rank
Jožko Kavalar	Men's 10 km classical	32:49.6	71
Robert Kerštajn	Men's 10 km classical	33:37.5	74
Jožko Kavalar	Men's 15 km freestyle pursuit^{1}	46:36.9	62
Robert Kerštajn	Men's 15 km freestyle pursuit^{1}	48:05.3	67
Jožko Kavalar	Men's 30 km classical	1'35:16.3	65
Robert Kerštajn	Men's 30 km classical	1'32:17.6	50
Jožko Kavalar	Men's 50 km freestyle	2'13:17.9	24
Robert Kerštajn	Men's 50 km freestyle	2'26:26.3	58

^{1} Starting delay based on 10 km results.

== Figure skating ==
Figure skating events were held at La halle de glace Olympique. Luka Klasinc and Mojca Kopač participated in the men's singles and women's singles categories. Both of them were eliminated in the first round and did not advance to the free skate round.

Athlete	Event	Short program	Free skating	Final
Luka Klasinc	Men's singles	26	Did not advance	
Mojca Kopač	Ladies' singles	26	Did not advance	

== Freestyle skiing ==
Freestyle skiing events were held between 9 and 16 February. Aleksander Peternel and Marko Jemec represented Slovenia, and both of them did not advance to the finals.

Athlete	Event	Qualification			Final		
Athlete	Event	Time	Points	Rank	Time	Points	Rank
Aleksander Peternel	Men's moguls	38.25	18.70	28	Did not advance		
Marko Jemec	Men's moguls	36.78	16.92	35	Did not advance		

== Ski jumping ==
Ski jumping competitions were held at Stade de Saut in Courcheval. Five Slovenian athletes participated across the three events in Ski jumping. Flag-bearer Franci Petek recorded the only top ten result in the individual events. In the team event, where each of the four member team did two jumps, the Slovenian team finished sixth with a combined tally of 543.3 points.

Athlete	Event	Jump 1		Jump 2		Total	
Athlete	Event	Distance	Points	Distance	Points	Points	Rank
Franci Petek	Normal hill	79.5	93.7	83.0	99.8	193.5	21
Matjaž Zupan	Normal hill	82.5	97.5	83.0	99.8	197.3	18
Primož Kopač	Normal hill	82.0	98.2	79.0	91.4	189.6	26
Samo Gostiša	Normal hill	84.0	101.4	84.0	100.4	201.8	12
Damjan Fras	Large hill	101.5	79.6	84.0	50.6	130.2	42
Franci Petek	Large hill	107.0	94.8	99.5	82.3	177.1	8
Matjaž Zupan	Large hill	101.5	81.6	96.0	72.4	154.0	27
Samo Gostiša	Large hill	97.5	72.5	103.5	86.4	158.9	22
Franci Petek; Matjaž Zupan; Primož Kopač; Samo Gostiša	Large hill team^{1}	—N/a				543.3	6

^{1} Four teams members performed two jumps each. The best three were counted.

== See also ==
- Croatia at the 1992 Winter Olympics
- Yugoslavia at the 1992 Winter Olympics
