= Biathlon at the 1992 Winter Olympics – Men's sprint =

Men's biathlon sprint at the XVI Olympic Winter Games
- Pictogram for biathlon
- Venue: Les Saisies
- Dates: February 12, 1992
- Competitors: 94 from 27 nations
- Winning time: 26:02.3

Medalists
1st place, gold medalist(s)		Mark Kirchner	Germany
2nd place, silver medalist(s)		Ricco Groß	Germany
3rd place, bronze medalist(s)		Harri Eloranta	Finland

The Men's 10 kilometre sprint biathlon competition at the 1992 Winter Olympics was held on 12 February, at Les Saisies. Competitors raced over three loops of the skiing course, shooting two times, once prone and once standing. Each miss was penalized by requiring the competitor to race over a 150-metre penalty loop.

== Results ==
Rank	Bib	Name	Country	Time	Penalties (P+S)	Deficit
1st place, gold medalist(s)	68	Mark Kirchner	Germany	26:02.3	0 (0+0)	–
2nd place, silver medalist(s)	19	Ricco Groß	Germany	26:18.0	1 (0+1)	+0:15.7
3rd place, bronze medalist(s)	5	Harri Eloranta	Finland	26:26.6	0 (0+0)	+0:24.3
4	48	Sergei Tchepikov	Unified Team	26:27.5	0 (0+0)	+0:25.2
5	14	Valery Kiriyenko	Unified Team	26:31.8	3 (1+2)	+0:29.5
6	82	Jens Steinigen	Germany	26:34.8	0 (0+0)	+0:32.5
7	50	Andreas Zingerle	Italy	26:38.6	1 (0+1)	+0:36.3
8	11	Steve Cyr	Canada	26:46.4	0 (0+0)	+0:44.1
9	34	Frank-Peter Roetsch	Germany	26:54.1	2 (0+2)	+0:51.8
10	10	Hervé Flandin	France	26:56.6	1 (0+1)	+0:54.3
11	80	Ludwig Gredler	Austria	27:14.8	2 (2+0)	+1:12.5
12	15	Ivan Masařík	Czechoslovakia	27:16.8	2 (0+2)	+1:14.5
13	56	Oļegs Maļuhins	Latvia	27:17.7	0 (0+0)	+1:15.4
14	9	Ulf Johansson	Sweden	27:19.0	0 (0+0)	+1:16.7
15	79	Johann Passler	Italy	27:20.4	3 (1+2)	+1:18.1
16	1	Zbigniew Filip	Poland	27:23.7	1 (0+1)	+1:21.4
17	26	Vesa Hietalahti	Finland	27:25.1	2 (1+1)	+1:22.8
18	88	Alexandr Popov	Unified Team	27:31.3	1 (1+0)	+1:29.0
19	13	Egon Leitner	Austria	27:31.8	2 (1+1)	+1:29.5
20	58	Mikael Löfgren	Sweden	27:33.3	0 (0+0)	+1:31.0
21	52	Franz Schuler	Austria	27:34.3	1 (0+1)	+1:32.0
22	46	Tomáš Kos	Czechoslovakia	27:37.4	1 (0+1)	+1:35.1
23	51	Jiří Holubec	Czechoslovakia	27:37.8	0 (0+0)	+1:35.5
24	4	Sylfest Glimsdal	Norway	27:38.9	4 (2+2)	+1:36.6
25	31	Valeriy Medvedtsev	Unified Team	27:39.5	2 (1+1)	+1:37.2
26	3	Hubert Leitgeb	Italy	27:40.3	2 (1+1)	+1:38.0
27	7	Hillar Zahkna	Estonia	27:46.5	2 (1+1)	+1:44.2
27	54	Kari Kataja	Finland	27:46.5	1 (0+1)	+1:44.2
29	32	Jan Ziemianin	Poland	27:47.2	1 (0+1)	+1:44.9
30	92	Patrice Bailly-Salins	France	27:49.7	3 (0+3)	+1:47.4
31	62	Urmas Kaldvee	Estonia	27:52.9	1 (1+0)	+1:50.6
32	71	Josh Thompson	United States	27:53.2	1 (0+1)	+1:50.9
33	35	Sašo Grajf	Slovenia	27:58.8	0 (0+0)	+1:56.5
34	37	Jon Åge Tyldum	Norway	28:01.4	0 (0+0)	+1:59.1
35	25	Krasimir Videnov	Bulgaria	28:04.0	1 (0+1)	+2:01.7
36	40	Misao Kodate	Japan	28:07.0	3 (2+1)	+2:04.7
37	28	Curt Schreiner	United States	28:08.4	0 (0+0)	+2:06.1
38	24	Tibor Géczi	Hungary	28:15.5	1 (0+1)	+2:13.2
39	41	Ilmārs Bricis	Latvia	28:23.3	1 (0+1)	+2:21.0
40	6	Aivars Bogdanovs	Latvia	28:24.2	1 (0+1)	+2:21.9
41	39	Pieralberto Carrara	Italy	28:30.1	3 (2+1)	+2:27.8
42	45	Christian Dumont	France	28:30.7	4 (3+1)	+2:28.4
43	86	Janez Ožbolt	Slovenia	28:31.1	0 (0+0)	+2:28.8
44	77	Gundars Upenieks	Latvia	28:32.7	1 (0+1)	+2:30.4
45	61	Xavier Blond	France	28:32.8	3 (1+2)	+2:30.5
46	74	Krzysztof Sosna	Poland	28:37.4	3 (0+3)	+2:35.1
47	65	Eirik Kvalfoss	Norway	28:38.2	2 (0+2)	+2:35.9
48	29	Tord Wiksten	Sweden	28:40.5	1 (1+0)	+2:38.2
49	20	Erich Wilbrecht	United States	28:41.1	2 (1+1)	+2:38.8
50	94	Martin Rypl	Czechoslovakia	28:41.8	1 (1+0)	+2:39.5
51	8	Boštjan Lekan	Slovenia	28:42.4	1 (0+1)	+2:40.1
52	64	Glenn Rupertus	Canada	28:43.3	3 (1+2)	+2:41.0
53	33	Alfred Eder	Austria	28:44.8	2 (0+2)	+2:42.5
54	67	Spas Zlatev	Bulgaria	28:45.9	1 (0+1)	+2:43.6
55	90	Duncan Douglas	United States	28:49.2	2 (0+2)	+2:46.9
56	63	Jan Wojtas	Poland	28:56.5	2 (0+2)	+2:54.2
57	81	Jaakko Niemi	Finland	29:04.0	2 (0+2)	+3:01.7
58	21	Kenneth Rudd	Great Britain	29:11.1	1 (0+1)	+3:08.8
59	85	Kalju Ojaste	Estonia	29:13.2	1 (0+1)	+3:10.9
60	57	Mike Dixon	Great Britain	29:19.4	2 (2+0)	+3:17.1
61	44	Aivo Udras	Estonia	29:28.4	2 (1+1)	+3:26.1
62	30	Tony Fiala	Canada	29:35.0	2 (1+1)	+3:32.7
63	22	Song Wenbin	China	29:39.3	1 (0+1)	+3:37.0
64	42	Gintaras Jasinskas	Lithuania	29:44.3	2 (0+2)	+3:42.0
65	17	Boycho Popov	Bulgaria	29:44.6	1 (0+1)	+3:42.3
66	83	Geir Einang	Norway	29:45.0	2 (1+1)	+3:42.7
67	89	Anders Mannelqvist	Sweden	29:52.0	3 (2+1)	+3:49.7
68	59	Uroš Velepec	Slovenia	29:54.3	2 (1+1)	+3:52.0
69	12	Gábor Mayer	Hungary	29:55.6	0 (0+0)	+3:53.3
70	36	Tan Hongbin	China	29:55.9	2 (0+2)	+3:53.6
71	76	Wang Weiyi	China	30:06.0	1 (0+1)	+4:03.7
72	27	Ian Woods	Great Britain	30:11.8	5 (1+4)	+4:09.5
73	66	János Panyik	Hungary	30:13.0	3 (1+2)	+4:10.7
74	73	Spas Gulev	Bulgaria	30:16.6	2 (0+2)	+4:14.3
75	53	Tang Guoliang	China	30:22.6	1 (1+0)	+4:20.3
76	47	Mladen Grujić	Yugoslavia	30:27.6	3 (2+1)	+4:25.3
77	60	Jean-Marc Chabloz	Switzerland	30:32.9	3 (2+1)	+4:30.6
78	72	Atsushi Kazama	Japan	30:34.7	6 (3+3)	+4:32.4
79	49	Thanasis Tsakiris	Greece	30:39.3	3 (1+2)	+4:37.0
80	78	Jason Sklenar	Great Britain	30:52.8	2 (0+2)	+4:50.5
81	18	Nicolae Şerban	Romania	31:29.6	4 (3+1)	+5:27.3
82	91	László Farkas	Hungary	31:43.6	2 (1+1)	+5:41.3
83	84	Tom Hansen	Canada	32:03.1	2 (1+1)	+6:00.8
84	16	Hong Byung-Sik	South Korea	32:59.2	3 (1+2)	+6:56.9
85	93	Admir Jamak	Yugoslavia	33:08.8	2 (0+2)	+7:06.5
86	69	Zoran Ćosić	Yugoslavia	33:14.6	2 (0+2)	+7:12.3
87	23	Tomislav Lopatić	Yugoslavia	34:30.1	3 (0+3)	+8:27.8
88	75	Jang Dong-lin	South Korea	34:44.2	4 (2+2)	+8:41.9
89	43	Kim Woon-ki	South Korea	35:05.8	2 (0+2)	+9:03.5
90	55	Han Myung-Hee	South Korea	35:48.9	5 (2+3)	+9:46.6
91	38	Luis Ríos	Argentina	36:07.5	3 (1+2)	+10:05.2
92	2	Alejandro Guerra	Argentina	40:16.8	2 (2+0)	+14:14.5
93	70	Juan Fernández	Argentina	40:32.0	2 (1+1)	+14:29.7
94	87	Roberto Lucero	Argentina	41:38.5	8 (4+4)	+15:36.2
