= Argentina at the 1992 Winter Olympics =

- IOC code: ARG
- NOC: Argentine Olympic Committee
- Website: www.coarg.org.ar (in Spanish)

in Albertville
- Competitors: 20 (15 men and 5 women) in 5 sports
- Medals: Gold 0 Silver 0 Bronze 0 Total 0

Winter Olympics appearances (overview)
- 1928; 1932–1936; 1948; 1952; 1956; 1960; 1964; 1968; 1972; 1976; 1980; 1984; 1988; 1992; 1994; 1998; 2002; 2006; 2010; 2014; 2018; 2022; 2026

Argentina competed at the 1992 Winter Olympics in Albertville, France.

== Competitors ==
The following is the list of number of competitors in the Games.

Sport	Men	Women	Total
Alpine skiing	4	2	6
Biathlon	5	2	7
Cross-country skiing	4	1	5
Freestyle skiing	1	0	1
Luge	1	0	1
Total	15	5	20

== Alpine skiing ==
Men

Athlete	Event	Race 1	Race 2	Total	
Athlete	Event	Time	Time	Time	Rank
Carlos Espiasse	Super-G			1:22.68	62
Gáston Begue	Super-G			1:22.52	61
Agustín Neiman	Super-G			1:22.47	60
Federico van Ditmar	Super-G			1:19.07	46
Federico van Ditmar	Giant Slalom	DNF	–	DNF	–
Gáston Begue	Giant Slalom	1:17.22	1:13.94	2:31.16	54
Carlos Espiasse	Giant Slalom	1:16.77	DNF	DNF	–
Agustín Neiman	Giant Slalom	1:16.44	1:11.87	2:28.31	47
Gáston Begue	Slalom	DNF	–	DNF	–
Federico van Ditmar	Slalom	1:00.62	1:00.87	2:01.49	39

Women

Athlete	Event	Race 1	Race 2	Total	
Athlete	Event	Time	Time	Time	Rank
Carolina Eiras	Downhill			2:02.81	29
Astrid Steverlynck	Super-G			1:33.48	40
Carolina Eiras	Super-G			1:32.33	39
Astrid Steverlynck	Giant Slalom	1:15.01	1:16.15	2:31.16	32
Carolina Eiras	Giant Slalom	1:12.55	1:13.36	2:25.91	27
Carolina Eiras	Slalom	DNF	–	DNF	–
Astrid Steverlynck	Slalom	54.83	50.70	1:45.53	30

Women's combined

Athlete	Downhill	Slalom		Total	
Athlete	Time	Time 1	Time 2	Points	Rank
Carolina Eiras	1:34.00	38.93	40.48	184.96	21
Astrid Steverlynck	1:31.71	38.56	DNF	DNF	–

== Biathlon ==
Men

Event	Athlete	Misses ^{1}	Time	Rank
10 km Sprint	Roberto Lucero	8	41:38.5	94
10 km Sprint	Juan Fernández	2	40:32.0	93
10 km Sprint	Alejandro Guerra	2	40:16.8	92
10 km Sprint	Luis Ríos	3	36:07.5	91

Event	Athlete	Time	Misses	Adjusted time ^{2}	Rank
20 km	Roberto Lucero	DNF	–	DNF	–
20 km	Juan Fernández	1'20:27.1	5	1'25:27.1	91
20 km	Marcelo Vásquez	1'14:02.6	8	1'22:02.6	90
20 km	Luis Ríos	1'11:43.8	3	1'14:43.8	86

Women

Event	Athlete	Misses ^{1}	Time	Rank
7.5 km Sprint	Fabiana Lovece	9	39:07.0	68
7.5 km Sprint	María Giro	0	27:53.5	36

Event	Athlete	Time	Misses	Adjusted time ^{2}	Rank
15 km	María Giro	57:18.0	6	1'03:18.0	63

^{1} A penalty loop of 150 metres had to be skied per missed target.
^{2} One minute added per missed target.

== Cross-country skiing ==
Men

Event	Athlete	Race	
Event	Athlete	Time	Rank
10 km C	Diego Prado	41:46.2	106
10 km C	Sébastian Menci	40:00.2	104
10 km C	Guillermo Alder	37:11.8	97
10 km C	Luis Argel	36:33.6	92
15 km pursuit^{1} F	Diego Prado	1'09:05.2	95
15 km pursuit^{1} F	Sébastian Menci	1'04:24.0	93
15 km pursuit^{1} F	Guillermo Alder	58:33.2	92
15 km pursuit^{1} F	Luis Argel	55:56.0	87
30 km C	Luis Argel	DNF	–
30 km C	Guillermo Alder	1'47:07.4	79

^{1} Starting delay based on 10 km results.
C = Classical style, F = Freestyle

Women

Event	Athlete	Race	
Event	Athlete	Time	Rank
5 km C	Inés Alder	18:31.6	60
10 km pursuit^{2} F	Inés Alder	39:41.4	57
15 km C	Inés Alder	54:26.9	49
30 km F	Inés Alder	1'50:50.6	55

^{2} Starting delay based on 5 km results.
C = Classical style, F = Freestyle

== Freestyle skiing ==
Men

Athlete	Event	Qualification			Final		
Athlete	Event	Time	Points	Rank	Time	Points	Rank
Ignacio Bustamante	Moguls	37.33	18.18	30	did not advance		

== Luge ==
Men

Athlete	Run 1		Run 2		Run 3		Run 4		Total	
Athlete	Time	Rank	Time	Rank	Time	Rank	Time	Rank	Time	Rank
Rubén González	47.301	28	47.238	29	48.086	30	49.152	33	3:11.777	31
