= Seppo Rantanen =

Finnish cross-country skier

Personal information
- Nationality: Finland
- Born: 2 September 1963 (age 62) Lappeenranta, Finland

Sport
- Sport: Skiing

World Cup career
- Seasons: 1986–1987, 1989–1992
- Indiv. starts: 11
- Indiv. podiums: 0
- Team starts: 1
- Team podiums: 0
- Overall titles: 0 – (30th in 1990)

Seppo Rantanen (born 2 September 1963) is a Finnish cross-country skier. He competed in the men's 30 kilometre classical event at the 1992 Winter Olympics.

== Cross-country skiing results ==
All results are sourced from the International Ski Federation (FIS).

=== Olympic Games ===
Year	Age	10 km	Pursuit	30 km	50 km	4 × 10 km relay
1992	28	—	—	38	—	—

=== World Championships ===
Year	Age	10 km	15 km classical	15 km freestyle	30 km	50 km	4 × 10 km relay
1989	25	—N/a	21	—	—	—	—
1991	27	25	—N/a	—	22	30	—

=== World Cup ===
==== Season standings ====
Season	Age	Overall
1986	22	NC
1987	23	NC
1989	25	NC
1990	26	30
1991	27	NC
1992	28	NC
