= Andrus Veerpalu =

Estonian cross-country skier

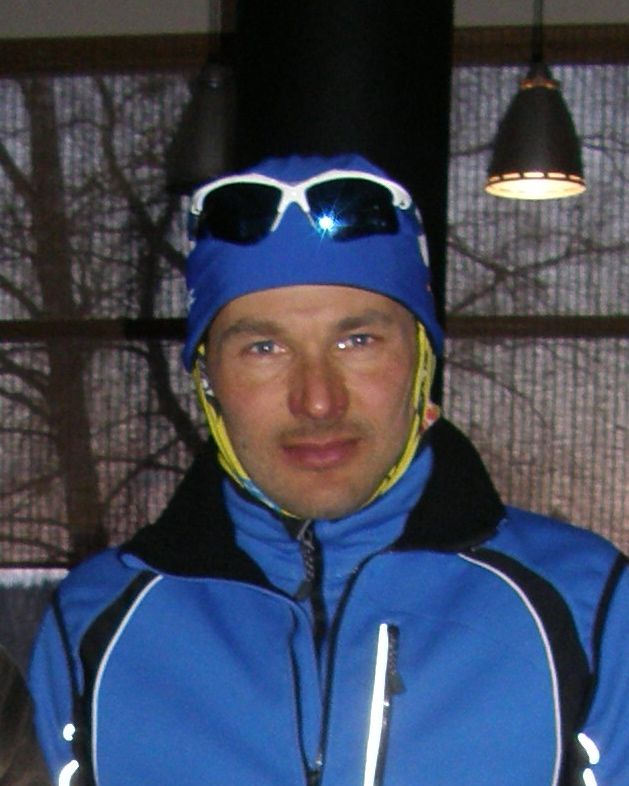
- Andrus Veerpalu in 2013

Personal information
- Nationality: Estonia
- Born: 8 February 1971 (age 55) Pärnu, then part of Estonian SSR, Soviet Union
- Height: 1.82 m (5 ft 11 1/2 in)

Sport
- Sport: Skiing
- Club: Jõulu

World Cup career
- Seasons: 19 – (1992–2006, 2008–2011)
- Indiv. starts: 141
- Indiv. podiums: 11
- Indiv. wins: 6
- Team starts: 28
- Team podiums: 0
- Overall titles: 0 – (7th in 2003, 2004)
- Discipline titles: 0
Medal record
Men's cross-country skiing
Representing Estonia
Olympic Games
Gold medal – first place	2002 Salt Lake City	15 km classical
Gold medal – first place	2006 Turin	15 km classical
Silver medal – second place	2002 Salt Lake City	50 km classical
World Championships
Gold medal – first place	2001 Lahti	30 km classical
Gold medal – first place	2009 Liberec	15 km classical
Silver medal – second place	1999 Ramsau	50 km classical

Andrus Veerpalu (born 8 February 1971) is a retired Estonian cross-country skier. He is Estonia's most successful Winter Olympian, having won the gold medal in men's 15 km classical in 2002 and 2006, and silver in men's 50 km classical in 2002.

== Career ==
On 17 February 2006 Veerpalu won his second Winter Olympics gold medal (in 15 km cross country skiing; his previous gold medal is from the Salt Lake City games), becoming the fourth Estonian to have won two Olympic gold medals (Kristjan Palusalu, Erika Salumäe and Kristina Šmigun-Vähi are the first three). He is the most successful Olympic athlete from Estonia with three medals. (Kristina Šmigun-Vähi tied that record at the 2010 Vancouver Winter Olympics)

Veerpalu has also found success at the FIS Nordic World Ski Championships, winning a gold at 15 km in 2009 at Liberec, 30 km in 2001 at Lahti and a silver at 50 km in 1999 at Ramsau. He has also won the 50 km event at the Holmenkollen ski festival in 2003 and 2005. Veerpalu also competed in the men's 50 km, Mass Start Classic at the 2010 Winter Olympics, finishing at the 6th place.

Veerpalu became the oldest world champion in history with his victory at Liberec 2009 on the 15 km classical event. He was then 38 years old. He is also the oldest Olympic champion in individual distance.

Veerpalu earned the Holmenkollen medal in 2005, the first Estonian to do so.

Veerpalu is the fourth athlete to compete in cross-country skiing at six Winter Olympics, after Marja-Liisa Kirvesniemi, Harri Kirvesniemi, and Jochen Behle. (Kateřina Neumannová is also a cross-country skier who competed at six Olympics, but one of her appearances was in cycling.)

On 23 February 2011, Veerpalu announced that he will end his professional sportsman career due to a chronic knee injury.

=== Doping case acquittal ===
Several months after Veerpalu's retirement it was announced that he had tested positive for HGH (growth hormone), however he had pleaded innocent in HGH treatment. Estonian biochemistry doctors explained that the verdict was untimely and that there was no reliable method to distinguish artificial HGH from natural background hormone. Veerpalu appealed the test result to the FIS. The FIS antidoping commission found Veerpalu guilty and extended his ban to three years, due to Veerpalu's team's lack of co-operation with FIS. A group of top Estonian biochemists investigated the matter and insist Veerpalu was a false positive. The Court of Arbitration for Sport acquitted Veerpalu, lifted his doping ban and ordered the FIS to pay a part of Veerpalu's court costs on 25 March 2013.
The court stated "that there are many factors in this case which tend to indicate that the Athlete did in fact himself administer exogenous hGH" but found that the decision limit, the threshold for considering the result an adverse analytical finding, was not sufficiently reliable to uphold the doping conviction. Krista Fischer, a senior researcher for the Estonian Genome Center, questioned what these unexplained factors hinted at by CAS could be: "So what were these factors? Right now the only numbers that seem to hint at doping are the same four numbers that have been ruled invalid."

== Cross-country skiing results ==
All results are sourced from the International Ski Federation (FIS).

=== Olympic Games ===
- 3 medals – (2 gold, 1 silver)

Year	Age	10 km	15 km	Pursuit	30 km	50 km	Sprint	4 × 10 km relay	Team sprint
1992	21	21	—N/a	42	44	—	—N/a	10	—N/a
1994	23	36	—N/a	55	—	26	—N/a	—	—N/a
1998	27	8	—N/a	DNS	19	—	—N/a	10	—N/a
2002	31	—N/a	Gold	—	—	Silver	—	9	—N/a
2006	35	—N/a	Gold	—	—N/a	—	—	8	—
2010	39	—N/a	—	—	—N/a	6	—	—	—

=== World Championships ===
- 3 medals – (2 gold, 1 silver)

Year	Age	10 km	15 km	Pursuit	30 km	50 km	Sprint	4 × 10 km relay	Team sprint
1993	22	49	—N/a	57	31	—	—N/a	15	—N/a
1995	24	72	—N/a	DNS	30	DNF	—N/a	11	—N/a
1997	26	32	—N/a	DNF	—	39	—N/a	11	—N/a
1999	28	14	—N/a	DNF	—	Silver	—N/a	10	—N/a
2001	30	—N/a	5	—	Gold	—	—	7	—N/a
2003	32	—N/a	8	DNF	4	—	—	8	—N/a
2005	34	—N/a	—	19	—N/a	4	—	9	—
2009	38	—N/a	Gold	19	—N/a	—	—	8	8

=== World Cup ===
==== Season standings ====
Season	Age	Discipline standings					Ski Tour standings		
Season	Age	Overall	Distance	Long Distance	Middle Distance	Sprint	Nordic Opening	Tour de Ski	World Cup Final
1992	21	NC	—N/a	—N/a	—N/a	—N/a	—N/a	—N/a	—N/a
1993	22	NC	—N/a	—N/a	—N/a	—N/a	—N/a	—N/a	—N/a
1994	23	78	—N/a	—N/a	—N/a	—N/a	—N/a	—N/a	—N/a
1995	24	73	—N/a	—N/a	—N/a	—N/a	—N/a	—N/a	—N/a
1996	25	NC	—N/a	—N/a	—N/a	—N/a	—N/a	—N/a	—N/a
1997	26	74	—N/a	60	—N/a	59	—N/a	—N/a	—N/a
1998	27	26	—N/a	24	—N/a	28	—N/a	—N/a	—N/a
1999	28	22	—N/a	12	—N/a	43	—N/a	—N/a	—N/a
2000	29	43	—N/a	23	51	36	—N/a	—N/a	—N/a
2001	30	42	—N/a	—N/a	—N/a	—	—N/a	—N/a	—N/a
2002	31	19	—N/a	—N/a	—N/a	NC	—N/a	—N/a	—N/a
2003	32	7	—N/a	—N/a	—N/a	—	—N/a	—N/a	—N/a
2004	33	7	6	—N/a	—N/a	23	—N/a	—N/a	—N/a
2005	34	13	10	—N/a	—N/a	58	—N/a	—N/a	—N/a
2006	35	—	—	—N/a	—N/a	—	—N/a	—N/a	—N/a
2008	37	50	34	—N/a	—N/a	77	—N/a	—	22
2009	38	27	20	—N/a	—N/a	77	—N/a	19	—
2010	39	41	20	—N/a	—N/a	108	—N/a	—	DNF
2011	40	86	50	—N/a	—N/a	NC	DNF	—	—

==== Individual podiums ====
- 6 victories – (6 WC)
- 11 podiums – (11 WC)

No.	Season	Date	Location	Race	Level	Place
1	1998–99	28 February 1999	Ramsau, Austria	50 km Individual C	World Championships^{[1]}	2nd
2	2002–03	12 January 2003	Otepää, Estonia	30 km Mass Start C	World Cup	3rd
3	2002–03	15 February 2003	Asiago, Italy	10 km Individual C	World Cup	1st
4	2002–03	8 March 2003	Oslo, Norway	50 km Individual C	World Cup	1st
5	2003–04	13 December 2003	Davos, Switzerland	15 km Individual C	World Cup	1st
6	2003–04	16 December 2003	Val di Fiemme, Italy	1.2 km Sprint C	World Cup	3rd
7	2003–04	17 January 2004	Nové Město, Czech Republic	15 km Individual C	World Cup	1st
8	2003–04	7 March 2004	Lahti, Finland	15 km Individual C	World Cup	3rd
9	2004–05	8 January 2005	Otepää, Estonia	15 km Individual C	World Cup	1st
10	2004–05	12 March 2005	Oslo, Norway	50 km Individual C	World Cup	1st
11	2009–10	16 January 2010	Otepää, Estonia	15 km Individual C	World Cup	2nd

Note: ^{1} Until the 1999 World Championships, World Championship races were included in the World Cup scoring system.

== Personal life ==
He is married to Angela Veerpalu and they have five children.

== See also ==
- List of athletes with the most appearances at Olympic Games

Awards
Preceded by Erki Nool	Estonian Male Athlete of the Year; 1999	Succeeded by Erki Nool
Preceded by Erki Nool	Estonian Male Athlete of the Year; 2001–2002	Succeeded by Andrus Värnik
Preceded by Andrus Värnik	Estonian Male Athlete of the Year; 2006	Succeeded by Gerd Kanter
Preceded by Gerd Kanter	Estonian Male Athlete of the Year; 2009	Succeeded by Nikolai Novosjolov
