= Spain at the 1992 Winter Olympics =

- IOC code: ESP
- NOC: Spanish Olympic Committee
- Website: www.coe.es (in Spanish)

in Albertville
- Competitors: 17 (13 men, 4 women) in 4 sports
- Flag bearer: Blanca Fernández Ochoa (alpine skiing)
- Medals: Gold 0 Silver 0 Bronze 1 Total 1

Winter Olympics appearances (overview)
- 1936; 1948; 1952; 1956; 1960; 1964; 1968; 1972; 1976; 1980; 1984; 1988; 1992; 1994; 1998; 2002; 2006; 2010; 2014; 2018; 2022; 2026

Spain competed at the 1992 Winter Olympics in Albertville, France.

== Medalists ==
Medal	Name	Sport	Event	Date
Bronze	Blanca Fernández Ochoa	Alpine skiing	Women's slalom	20 February

== Competitors ==
The following is the list of number of competitors in the Games.

Sport	Men	Women	Total
Alpine skiing	6	4	10
Cross-country skiing	4	0	4
Freestyle skiing	2	0	2
Luge	1	0	1
Total	13	4	17

== Alpine skiing ==
Men

Athlete	Event	Race 1	Race 2	Total	
Athlete	Event	Time	Time	Time	Rank
Ricardo Campo	Downhill			1:54.89	30
Xavier Ubeira	Super-G			DSQ	–
Vicente Tomas	Super-G			1:17.54	38
Jorge Pujol	Super-G			1:17.15	35
Ricardo Campo	Super-G			1:17.11	34
Ricardo Campo	Giant Slalom	1:10.15	1:07.62	2:17.77	32
Xavier Ubeira	Giant Slalom	1:09.75	1:07.31	2:17.06	31
Jorge Pujol	Giant Slalom	1:09.20	DNF	DNF	–
Vicente Tomas	Giant Slalom	1:09.15	1:06.40	2:15.55	27
Ovidio García	Slalom	DNF	–	DNF	–
Ricardo Campo	Slalom	56.99	57.53	1:54.52	31
Jorge Pujol	Slalom	56.73	56.28	1:53.01	28
Abraham Fernández	Slalom	56.64	56.33	1:52.97	27

Men's combined

Athlete	Downhill	Slalom		Total	
Athlete	Time	Time 1	Time 2	Points	Rank
Abraham Fernández	DNF	–	–	DNF	–
Jorge Pujol	1:50.64	50.40	53.17	72.07	17
Ricardo Campo	1:49.20	55.64	56.30	104.61	23

Women

Athlete	Event	Race 1	Race 2	Total	
Athlete	Event	Time	Time	Time	Rank
Emma Bosch	Super-G			1:28.45	35
Ainhoa Ibarra	Super-G			1:26.96	29
Emma Bosch	Giant Slalom	1:11.78	1:11.04	2:22.82	24
Ainhoa Ibarra	Giant Slalom	1:11.16	1:11.66	2:22.82	24
Silvia del Rincon	Giant Slalom	1:11.10	1:12.10	2:23.20	26
Blanca Fernández Ochoa	Giant Slalom	1:08.09	1:07.32	2:15.41	12
Ainhoa Ibarra	Slalom	51.35	49.84	1:41.19	26
Silvia del Rincon	Slalom	51.02	48.20	1:39.22	23
Blanca Fernández Ochoa	Slalom	48.25	45.10	1:33.35	3rd place, bronze medalist(s)

== Cross-country skiing ==
Men

Event	Athlete	Race	
Event	Athlete	Time	Rank
10 km C	Antonio Cascos	34:18.5	76
10 km C	Jordi Ribó	32:33.9	68
10 km C	Carlos Vicente	31:56.2	56
10 km C	Juan Jesús Gutiérrez	31:02.6	39
15 km pursuit^{1} F	Antonio Cascos	49:00.8	70
15 km pursuit^{1} F	Jordi Ribó	46:27.7	61
15 km pursuit^{1} F	Carlos Vicente	46:11.4	58
15 km pursuit^{1} F	Juan Jesús Gutiérrez	43:17.5	37
30 km C	Carlos Vicente	1'33:33.34	57
30 km C	Jordi Ribó	1'31:52.4	46
50 km F	Antonio Cascos	2'22:59.0	51
50 km F	Jordi Ribó	2'16:58.81	38
50 km F	Juan Jesús Gutiérrez	2'11:42.1	19

^{1} Starting delay based on 10 km results.
C = Classical style, F = Freestyle

Men's 4 × 10 km relay

Athletes	Race	
Athletes	Time	Rank
Jordi Ribó; Carlos Vicente; Antonio Cascos; Juan Jesús Gutiérrez	1'52:05.3	14

== Freestyle skiing ==
Men

Athlete	Event	Qualification			Final		
Athlete	Event	Time	Points	Rank	Time	Points	Rank
José Rojas	Moguls	58.47	4.15	45	did not advance		
Rafael Herrero	Moguls	36.74	18.13	31	did not advance		

== Luge ==
Men

Athlete	Run 1		Run 2		Run 3		Run 4		Total	
Athlete	Time	Rank	Time	Rank	Time	Rank	Time	Rank	Time	Rank
Pablo García	46.521	23	46.818	24	47.256	23	47.715	28	3:08.310	25
