= Norway at the 1992 Winter Olympics =

- IOC code: NOR
- NOC: Norwegian Olympic Committee

in Albertville, France 8–23 February
- Competitors: 80 (61 men, 19 women) in 11 sports
- Flag bearer: Eirik Kvalfoss (Biathlon)
- Medals Ranked 3rd: Gold 9 Silver 6 Bronze 5 Total 20

Winter Olympics appearances (overview)
- 1924; 1928; 1932; 1936; 1948; 1952; 1956; 1960; 1964; 1968; 1972; 1976; 1980; 1984; 1988; 1992; 1994; 1998; 2002; 2006; 2010; 2014; 2018; 2022; 2026

Norway competed at the 1992 Winter Olympics in Albertville, France.

As Lillehammer would be hosting the following Winter Olympics, a Norwegian segment was performed at the closing ceremony.

== Medalists ==
Medal	Name	Sport	Event	Date
Gold	Vegard Ulvang	Cross-country skiing	Men's 30 kilometre classical	10 February
Gold	Vegard Ulvang	Cross-country skiing	Men's 10 kilometre classical	13 February
Gold	Geir Karlstad	Speed skating	Men's 5000 metres	13 February
Gold	Bjørn Dæhlie	Cross-country skiing	Men's 15 kilometre freestyle pursuit	15 February
Gold	Kjetil André Aamodt	Alpine skiing	Men's super-G	16 February
Gold	Johann Olav Koss	Speed skating	Men's 1500 metres	16 February
Gold	Terje Langli; Vegard Ulvang; Kristen Skjeldal; Bjørn Dæhlie	Cross-country skiing	Men's 4 × 10 kilometre relay	18 February
Gold	Bjørn Dæhlie	Cross-country skiing	Men's 50 kilometre freestyle	22 February
Gold	Finn Christian Jagge	Alpine skiing	Men's slalom	22 February
Silver	Bjørn Dæhlie	Cross-country skiing	Men's 30 kilometre classical	10 February
Silver	Vegard Ulvang	Cross-country skiing	Men's 15 kilometre freestyle pursuit	15 February
Silver	Ådne Søndrål	Speed skating	Men's 1500 metres	16 February
Silver	Trude Dybendahl; Inger Helene Nybråten; Solveig Pedersen; Elin Nilsen	Cross-country skiing	Women's 4 × 5 kilometre relay	17 February
Silver	Knut Tore Apeland; Trond Einar Elden; Fred Børre Lundberg	Nordic combined	Team	17 February
Silver	Johann Olav Koss	Speed skating	Men's 10,000 metres	20 February
Bronze	Terje Langli	Cross-country skiing	Men's 30 kilometre classical	10 February
Bronze	Stine Lise Hattestad	Freestyle skiing	Women's moguls	13 February
Bronze	Jan Einar Thorsen	Alpine skiing	Men's super-G	16 February
Bronze	Kjetil André Aamodt	Alpine skiing	Men's giant slalom	18 February
Bronze	Geir Karlstad	Speed skating	Men's 10,000 metres	20 February

== Competitors ==
The following is the list of number of competitors in the Games.

Sport	Men	Women	Total
Alpine skiing	8	3	11
Biathlon	6	6	12
Bobsleigh	2	–	2
Cross-country skiing	5	5	10
Freestyle skiing	0	2	2
Ice hockey	23	–	23
Luge	2	0	2
Nordic combined	4	–	4
Short track speed skating	1	0	1
Ski jumping	4	–	4
Speed skating	6	3	9
Total	61	19	80

== Alpine skiing ==
Men

Athlete	Event	Race 1	Race 2	Total	
Athlete	Event	Time	Time	Time	Rank
Tom Stiansen	Downhill			1:55.62	32
Kjetil André Aamodt	Downhill			1:54.24	26
Lasse Arnesen	Downhill			1:51.63	8
Jan Einar Thorsen	Downhill			1:50.79	5
Tom Stiansen	Super-G			1:14.51	8
Ole Kristian Furuseth	Super-G			1:13.87	4
Jan Einar Thorsen	Super-G			1:13.83	3rd place, bronze medalist(s)
Kjetil André Aamodt	Super-G			1:13.04	1st place, gold medalist(s)
Didrik Marksten	Giant Slalom	DNF	–	DNF	–
Lasse Kjus	Giant Slalom	DNF	–	DNF	–
Ole Kristian Furuseth	Giant Slalom	1:05.63	1:02.53	2:08.16	5
Kjetil André Aamodt	Giant Slalom	1:04.81	1:03.01	2:07.82	3rd place, bronze medalist(s)
Didrik Marksten	Slalom	DNF	–	DNF	–
Kjetil André Aamodt	Slalom	54.42	DNF	DNF	–
Ole Kristian Furuseth	Slalom	53.14	DNF	DNF	–
Finn Christian Jagge	Slalom	51.43	52.96	1:44.39	1st place, gold medalist(s)

Men's combined

Athlete	Downhill	Slalom		Total	
Athlete	Time	Time 1	Time 2	Points	Rank
Tom Stiansen	DNF	–	–	DNF	–
Ole Kristian Furuseth	1:48.94	50.59	50.45	40.47	7
Lasse Arnesen	1:46.81	53.33	53.59	51.93	10
Jan Einar Thorsen	1:44.97	54.59	55.80	52.75	11

Women

Athlete	Event	Race 1	Race 2	Total	
Athlete	Event	Time	Time	Time	Rank
Astrid Lødemel	Downhill			1:54.76	15
Astrid Lødemel	Super-G			DNF	–
Merete Fjeldavlie	Super-G			DNF	–
Anne Berge	Super-G			1:25.65	21
Astrid Lødemel	Giant Slalom	DNF	–	DNF	–
Anne Berge	Giant Slalom	1:09.90	1:09.61	2:19.51	21
Merete Fjeldavlie	Giant Slalom	1:08.66	1:08.57	2:17.23	15
Merete Fjeldavlie	Slalom	51.65	47.02	1:38.67	22
Anne Berge	Slalom	49.39	44.83	1:34.22	8

Women's combined

Athlete	Downhill	Slalom		Total	
Athlete	Time	Time 1	Time 2	Points	Rank
Anne Berge	1:28.67	34.93	34.36	35.28	5
Merete Fjeldavlie	1:28.26	35.52	DSQ	DSQ	–
Astrid Lødemel	1:26.95	37.29	55.96	210.94	22

== Biathlon ==
Men

Event	Athlete	Misses ^{1}	Time	Rank
10 km Sprint	Geir Einang	2	29:45.0	66
10 km Sprint	Eirik Kvalfoss	2	28:38.2	47
10 km Sprint	Jon Åge Tyldum	0	28:01.4	34
10 km Sprint	Sylfest Glimsdal	4	27:38.9	24

Event	Athlete	Time	Misses	Adjusted time ^{2}	Rank
20 km	Geir Einang	59:04.8	3	1'02:04.8	36
20 km	Eirik Kvalfoss	58:52.4	2	1'00:52.4	27
20 km	Gisle Fenne	57:32.9	1	58:32.9	9
20 km	Frode Løberg	57:32.4	1	58:32.4	8

Men's 4 × 7.5 km relay

Athletes	Race		
Athletes	Misses ^{1}	Time	Rank
Geir Einang; Frode Løberg; Gisle Fenne; Eirik Kvalfoss	1	1'26:32.4	5

Women

Event	Athlete	Misses ^{1}	Time	Rank
7.5 km Sprint	Anne Elvebakk	3	27:34.2	32
7.5 km Sprint	Grete Ingeborg Nykkelmo	5	27:24.2	31
7.5 km Sprint	Signe Trosten	2	26:43.3	19
7.5 km Sprint	Elin Kristiansen	1	26:23.3	15

Event	Athlete	Time	Misses	Adjusted time ^{2}	Rank
15 km	Åse Idland	53:05.0	4	57:05.0	27
15 km	Grete Ingeborg Nykkelmo	50:59.4	5	55:59.4	18
15 km	Signe Trosten	51:24.5	2	53:24.5	10
15 km	Elin Kristiansen	51:19.6	2	53:19.6	9

Women's 3 × 7.5 km relay

Athletes	Race		
Athletes	Misses ^{1}	Time	Rank
Signe Trosten; Hildegunn Fossen; Elin Kristiansen	1	1'21:20.0	7

^{1} A penalty loop of 150 metres had to be skied per missed target.
^{2} One minute added per missed target.

== Bobsleigh ==
Sled	Athletes	Event	Run 1		Run 2		Run 3		Run 4		Total	
Sled	Athletes	Event	Time	Rank	Time	Rank	Time	Rank	Time	Rank	Time	Rank
NOR-1	Erik Gogstad; Atle Norstad	Two-man	1:01.64	25	1:02.24	27	1:02.24	26	1:02.36	25	4:08.48	27

== Cross-country skiing ==
Men

Event	Athlete	Race	
Event	Athlete	Time	Rank
10 km C	Kristen Skjeldal	31:02.0	38
10 km C	Terje Langli	29:51.0	20
10 km C	Bjørn Dæhlie	28:01.6	4
10 km C	Vegard Ulvang	27:36.0	1st place, gold medalist(s)
15 km pursuit^{1} F	Vegard Ulvang	38:55.3	2nd place, silver medalist(s)
15 km pursuit^{1} F	Bjørn Dæhlie	38:01.9	1st place, gold medalist(s)
30 km C	Erling Jevne	1'24:07.7	5
30 km C	Terje Langli	1'23:42.5	3rd place, bronze medalist(s)
30 km C	Bjørn Dæhlie	1'23:14.0	2nd place, silver medalist(s)
30 km C	Vegard Ulvang	1'22:27.8	1st place, gold medalist(s)
50 km F	Kristen Skjeldal	2'11:44.5	20
50 km F	Terje Langli	2'11:32.0	18
50 km F	Vegard Ulvang	2'08:21.5	9
50 km F	Bjørn Dæhlie	2'03:41.5	1st place, gold medalist(s)

^{1} Starting delay based on 10 km results.
C = Classical style, F = Freestyle

Men's 4 × 10 km relay

Athletes	Race	
Athletes	Time	Rank
Terje Langli; Vegard Ulvang; Kristen Skjeldal; Bjørn Dæhlie	1'39:26.0	1st place, gold medalist(s)

Women

Event	Athlete	Race	
Event	Athlete	Time	Rank
5 km C	Trude Dybendahl	15:10.8	21
5 km C	Elin Nilsen	14:50.8	10
5 km C	Solveig Pedersen	14:42.1	8
5 km C	Inger Helene Nybråten	14:33.3	5
10 km pursuit^{2} F	Solveig Pedersen	28:26.6	15
10 km pursuit^{2} F	Inger Helene Nybråten	27:21.1	7
10 km pursuit^{2} F	Elin Nilsen	26:36.9	5
15 km C	Inger Lise Hegge	46:03.9	21
15 km C	Solveig Pedersen	45:51.3	20
15 km C	Trude Dybendahl	44:31.5	8
15 km C	Inger Helene Nybråten	44:18.6	7
30 km F	Inger Lise Hegge	1'29:31.6	14
30 km F	Inger Helene Nybråten	1'28:21.8	13
30 km F	Trude Dybendahl	1'27:29.8	9
30 km F	Elin Nilsen	1'26:25.1	4

^{2} Starting delay based on 5 km results.
C = Classical style, F = Freestyle

Women's 4 × 5 km relay

Athletes	Race	
Athletes	Time	Rank
Solveig Pedersen; Inger Helene Nybråten; Trude Dybendahl; Elin Nilsen	59:56.4	2nd place, silver medalist(s)

== Curling ==
Curling was a demonstration sport at the 1992 Winter Olympics.

Norway
Risenga CK, Oslo

Skip: Tormod Andreassen
Third: Stig-Arne Gunnestad
Second: Flemming Davanger
Lead: Kjell Berg
Alternate: Pål Trulsen

== Figure skating ==
Men

Athlete	SP	FS	TFP	Rank
Jan Erik Digermes	DNF	–	DNF	–

== Freestyle skiing ==
Women

Athlete	Event	Qualification			Final		
Athlete	Event	Time	Points	Rank	Time	Points	Rank
Kari Traa	Moguls	45.25	17.30	14	did not advance		
Stine Lise Hattestad	Moguls	39.62	23.11	3 Q	40.26	23.04	3rd place, bronze medalist(s)

== Ice hockey ==
=== Group B ===
Twelve participating teams were placed in two groups. After playing a round-robin, the top four teams in each group advanced to the Medal Round while the last two teams competed in the consolation round for the 9th to 12th places.

Team advanced to the Final Round
Team sent to compete in the consolation round

Team	GP	W	L	T	GF	GA	DIF	PTS
Canada	5	4	1	0	28	9	19	8
Unified Team	5	4	1	0	32	10	22	8
Czechoslovakia	5	4	1	0	25	15	10	8
France	5	2	3	0	14	22	-8	4
Switzerland	5	1	4	0	13	25	-12	2
Norway	5	0	5	0	7	38	-31	0

Czechoslovakia	10:1	Norway
Unified Team	8:1	Norway
Canada	10:0	Norway
Switzerland	6:3	Norway
France	4:2	Norway

=== Consolation round 9th-12th places ===
Norway	5:3	Italy

9th place match

Norway 9th	5:2	Switzerland

Contestants

- Steve Allman
- Jim Marthinsen
- Robert Schistad
- Petter Salsten
- Kim Søgaard
- Geir Hoff
- Tommy Jakobsen
- Jon-Magne Karlstad
- Jan-Roar Fagerli
- Morgan Andersen
- Rune Gulliksen
- Martin Friis
- Petter Thoresen
- Marius Rath
- Tom Johansen
- Ørjan Løvdal
- Øystein Olsen
- Arne Billkvam
- Erik Kristiansen
- Jarle Friis
- Carl Gunnar Gundersen
- Ole Eskild Dahlstrøm
- Eirik Paulsen

- Head coach: Bengt Ohlson

== Luge ==
(Men's) Doubles

Athletes	Run 1		Run 2		Total	
Athletes	Time	Rank	Time	Rank	Time	Rank
Harald Rolfsen; Snorre Pedersen	47.610	18	47.368	16	1:34.978	16

== Nordic combined ==
Men's individual

Events:

- normal hill ski jumping (Best two out of three jumps.)
- 15 km cross-country skiing (Start delay, based on ski jumping results.)

Athlete	Event	Ski Jumping		Cross-country		Total
Athlete	Event	Points	Rank	Start at	Time	Rank
Bård Jørgen Elden	Individual	167.7	45	+6:45.4	49:17.5	21
Trond Einar Elden	Individual	181.9	39	+5:10.7	47:11.9	9
Knut Tore Apeland	Individual	190.7	35	+4:12.0	47:23.9	10
Fred Børre Lundberg	Individual	211.9	9	+1:50.7	45:54.8	4

Men's Team

Three participants per team.

Events:

- normal hill ski jumping (Best two out of three jumps per team member were counted.)
- 10 km cross-country skiing (Start delay, based on ski jumping results.)

Athletes	Ski jumping		Cross-country		Total
Athletes	Points	Rank	Start at	Time	Rank
Knut Tore Apeland; Fred Børre Lundberg; Trond Einar Elden	569.9	6	+6:16.0	1'25:02.9	2nd place, silver medalist(s)

== Short track speed skating ==
Men

Athlete	Event	Round one		Quarter finals		Semi finals		Finals	
Athlete	Event	Time	Rank	Time	Rank	Time	Rank	Time	Final rank
Gisle Elvebakken	1000 m	1:41.50	3	did not advance					

== Ski jumping ==
Athlete	Event	Jump 1		Jump 2		Total	
Athlete	Event	Distance	Points	Distance	Points	Points	Rank
Espen Bredesen	Normal hill	73.5	73.1	65.0	54.0	127.1	58
Magne Johansen	Normal hill	77.0	86.7	78.5	87.6	174.3	49
Øyvind Berg	Normal hill	78.5	90.1	81.5	95.9	186.0	35
Lasse Ottesen	Normal hill	86.5	107.4	72.5	72.0	179.4	45
Espen Bredesen	Large hill	83.5	45.4	75.5	28.7	74.1	57
Lasse Ottesen	Large hill	92.0	60.3	92.5	66.5	126.8	45
Øyvind Berg	Large hill	96.5	73.6	92.5	67.0	140.6	34
Magne Johansen	Large hill	100.0	79.5	104.5	86.8	166.3	18

Men's team large hill

Athletes	Result	
Athletes	Points ^{1}	Rank
Espen Bredesen; Magne Johansen; Rune Olijnyk; Lasse Ottesen	538.0	7

^{1} Four teams members performed two jumps each. The best three were counted.

== Speed skating ==
Men

Event	Athlete	Race	
Event	Athlete	Time	Rank
1000 m	Ådne Søndrål	1:17.56	29
1500 m	Steinar Johansen	2:00.79	29
1500 m	Geir Karlstad	1:56.98	8
1500 m	Ådne Søndrål	1:54.85	2nd place, silver medalist(s)
1500 m	Johann Olav Koss	1:54.81	1st place, gold medalist(s)
5000 m	Atle Vårvik	7:28.28	28
5000 m	Johann Olav Koss	7:11.32	7
5000 m	Geir Karlstad	6:59.97	1st place, gold medalist(s)
10,000 m	Steinar Johansen	14:36.09	8
10,000 m	Geir Karlstad	14:18.13	3rd place, bronze medalist(s)
10,000 m	Johann Olav Koss	14:14.58	2nd place, silver medalist(s)

Women

Event	Athlete	Race	
Event	Athlete	Time	Rank
500 m	Edel Therese Høiseth	41.89	20
1000 m	Else Ragni Yttredal	1:24.54	21
1000 m	Edel Therese Høiseth	1:23.85	13
1500 m	Edel Therese Høiseth	2:14.93	30
1500 m	Else Ragni Yttredal	2:09.38	12
3000 m	Anette Tønsberg	4:38.66	20
3000 m	Else Ragni Yttredal	4:36.98	16
5000 m	Else Ragni Yttredal	8:09.69	22
5000 m	Anette Tønsberg	8:09.68	21
