= Torald Rein =

German cross-country skier (born 1968)

Personal information
- Nationality: Germany
- Born: 22 October 1968 (age 57) Wernigerode, East Germany

Sport
- Sport: Skiing
- Club: SC Monte Kaolino Hirschau

World Cup career
- Seasons: 11 – (1989–1990, 1992–2000)
- Indiv. starts: 52
- Indiv. podiums: 0
- Team starts: 11
- Team podiums: 0
- Overall titles: 0 – (91st in 1995, 1998)
- Discipline titles: 0

Torald Rein (born 22 October 1968) is a German, former cross-country skier who competed from 1992 to 2001. His best finish at the Winter Olympics was fourth in the 4 x 10 km relay at Lillehammer in 1994 while his best individual finish was 21st in the 10 km + 15 km combined pursuit at Albertville in 1992.

Rein's best finish at the FIS Nordic World Ski Championships was 32nd in the 10 km + 15 km combined pursuit at Falun in 1993. His best World Cup finish was 25th in a 30 km event in Canada in 1991.

Rein's only individual victory was in a 15 km Continental Cup event in Germany in 1997.

== Cross-country skiing results ==
All results are sourced from the International Ski Federation (FIS).

=== Olympic Games ===
Year	Age	10 km	Pursuit	30 km	50 km	4 × 10 km relay
1992	23	29	21	30	—	6
1994	25	32	38	—	DNS	4
1998	29	—	—	57	—	—

=== World Championships ===
Year	Age	10 km	15 km classical	15 km freestyle	Pursuit	30 km	50 km	4 × 10 km relay
1989	20	—N/a	24	33	—N/a	—	35	6
1993	24	38	—N/a	—N/a	32	—	DNF	5
1995	26	—	—N/a	—N/a	—	50	—	—
1999	30	—	—N/a	—N/a	—	—	40	—

=== World Cup ===
==== Season standings ====
Season	Age				
Season	Age	Overall	Long Distance	Middle Distance	Sprint
1989	20	NC	—N/a	—N/a	—N/a
1990	21	NC	—N/a	—N/a	—N/a
1992	23	NC	—N/a	—N/a	—N/a
1993	24	NC	—N/a	—N/a	—N/a
1994	25	NC	—N/a	—N/a	—N/a
1995	26	91	—N/a	—N/a	—N/a
1996	27	NC	—N/a	—N/a	—N/a
1997	28	NC	NC	—N/a	NC
1998	29	91	NC	—N/a	71
1999	30	NC	NC	—N/a	—
2000	31	NC	—	—	NC
