= Velepec =

Velepec is a surname. Notable people with the surname include:

- Jure Velepec (born 1965), Slovenian biathlete
- Uroš Velepec (born 1967), Slovenian biathlete
