= Greece at the 1992 Winter Olympics =

- IOC code: GRE
- NOC: Committee of the Olympic Games

in Albertville France
- Competitors: 8 (7 men, 1 woman) in 3 sports
- Flag bearer: Thanasis Tsakiris
- Medals: Gold 0 Silver 0 Bronze 0 Total 0

Winter Olympics appearances (overview)
- 1936; 1948; 1952; 1956; 1960; 1964; 1968; 1972; 1976; 1980; 1984; 1988; 1992; 1994; 1998; 2002; 2006; 2010; 2014; 2018; 2022; 2026

Greece competed at the 1992 Winter Olympics in Albertville, France.

== Competitors ==
The following is the list of number of competitors in the Games.

Sport	Men	Women	Total
Alpine skiing	2	1	3
Biathlon	2	0	2
Cross-country skiing	4	0	4
Total	7	1	8

== Alpine skiing ==
Men

Athlete	Event	Race 1	Race 2	Total	
Athlete	Event	Time	Time	Time	Rank
Ioannis Kapraras	Super-G			1:26.47	73
Thomas Lefousi	Super-G			1:25.01	71
Ioannis Kapraras	Giant Slalom	DNF	–	DNF	–
Thomas Lefousi	Giant Slalom	1:17.22	DNF	DNF	–
Ioannis Kapraras	Slalom	DNF	–	DNF	–
Thomas Lefousi	Slalom	DNF	–	DNF	–

Women

Athlete	Event	Race 1	Race 2	Total	
Athlete	Event	Time	Time	Time	Rank
Thomai Lefousi	Super-G			1:37.61	42
Thomai Lefousi	Giant Slalom	DNF	–	DNF	–
Thomai Lefousi	Slalom	57.16	DNF	DNF	–

== Biathlon ==
Men

Event	Athlete	Misses ^{1}	Time	Rank
10 km Sprint	Thanasis Tsakiris	3	30:39.3	79

Event	Athlete	Time	Misses	Adjusted time ^{2}	Rank
20 km	Nikos Anastasiadis	1'18:45.5	7	1'25:45.5	92
20 km	Thanasis Tsakiris	1'00:37.2	2	1'02:37.2	42

^{1} A penalty loop of 150 metres had to be skied per missed target.
^{2} One minute added per missed target.

== Cross-country skiing ==
Men

Event	Athlete	Race	
Event	Athlete	Time	Rank
10 km C	Nikos Anastasiadis	37:26.5	99
10 km C	Dimitrios Tsourekas	37:15.6	98
10 km C	Timoleon Tsourekas	36:26.9	91
10 km C	Ioannis Mitroulas	35:25.4	84
15 km pursuit^{1} F	Dimitrios Tsourekas	58:23.9	91
15 km pursuit^{1} F	Timoleon Tsourekas	56:04.6	88
15 km pursuit^{1} F	Nikos Anastasiadis	54:36.2	82
30 km C	Nikos Anastasiadis	DNF	–
30 km C	Dimitrios Tsourekas	1'43:41.9	76
30 km C	Ioannis Mitroulas	1'42:50.5	74

^{1} Starting delay based on 10 km results.
C = Classical style, F = Freestyle

Men's 4 × 10 km relay

Athletes	Race	
Athletes	Time	Rank
Dimitrios Tsourekas; Timoleon Tsourekas; Nikos Anastasiadis; Thanasis Tsakiris	2'05:46.4	16
