= Pušnik =

Pušnik is a Slovenian language surname. People with the name include:

- Katjuša Pušnik (born 1969), Slovenian former alpine skier
- Marijan Pušnik (born 1960), Slovenian football manager
- Rolando Pušnik (born 1961), Slovenian former handball player
