= Harri Eloranta =

Finnish biathlete

Medal record

Men's biathlon

Representing Finland

Olympic Games
| Bronze medal – third place | 1992 Albertville | 10 km Sprint |

Harri Henrik Eloranta (born 4 December 1963 in Köyliö) is a Finnish former biathlete, who won the bronze medal in the 10 km sprint at the 1992 Olympics in Albertville, France.
