= John Farra =

American cross-country skier

Personal information
- Born: September 10, 1970 (age 55) Saratoga Springs, New York, United States

Sport
- Sport: Cross-country skiing

John Farra (born September 10, 1970) is an American former cross-country skier. He competed in the men's 10 kilometre classical event at the 1992 Winter Olympics. Following the Olympics, Farra worked in several roles as a high performance director, including for the U.S. Ski and Snowboard Association.

== Biography ==
Farra was born in Saratoga Springs, New York in 1970, and began skiing when he was two years old. Farra attended the University of Utah, and would later go on to coach the university's cross-country ski team. He also attended the National Sports Academy in Lake Placid.

In 1990, Farra joined the US Ski Team ahead of the 1992 Winter Olympics. At the 1992 Winter Olympics, Farra finished in 60th place in the men's 10 kilometre classical event, and in 49th place in the men's 15 kilometre freestyle pursuit event.

In 2008, Farra became the Nordic Director of the U.S. Ski and Snowboard Association. He went on to become the High Performance Director of the U.S. Paralympics Nordic ski programme. In 2018, Farra was also named as the High Performance General Manager of USA Triathlon.
