= Krista Fischer =

Estonian biostatistician (born 1970)

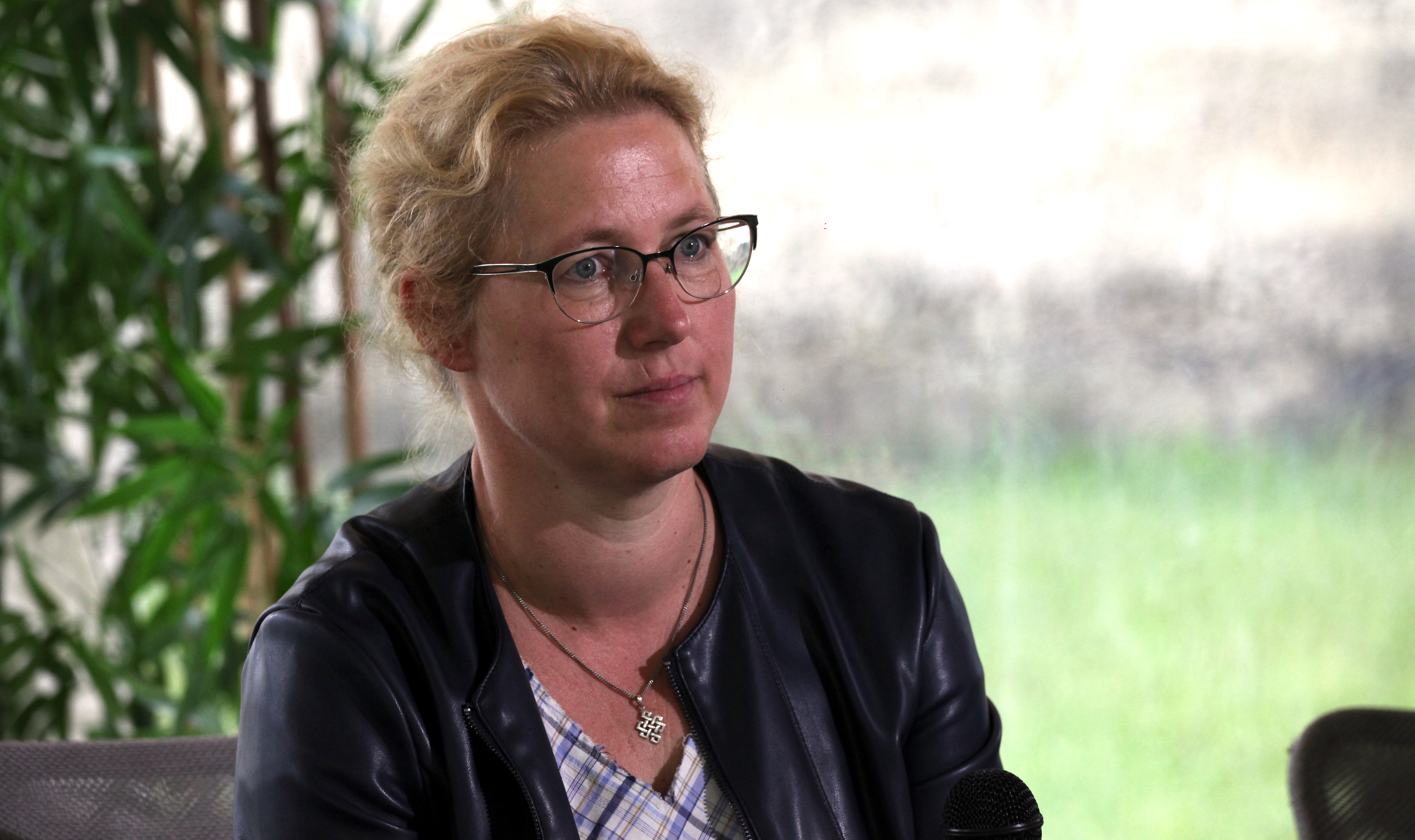
- Fischer in 2021
- Born: 5 August 1970 (age 56)
- Education: University of Tartu; Limburg University
- Occupation: Biostatistician

Krista Fischer (born 5 August 1970) is an Estonian biostatistician whose research concerns body mass, genetic variability, and their association with diseases. She is a professor of mathematical statistics in the Institute of Mathematics and Statistics at the University of Tartu, where she is also an associate professor in the Institute of Genomics.

== Education and career ==
Fischer was an undergraduate at the University of Tartu, specializing in mathematics and statistics, from 1988 to 1992. After earning a master's degree in mathematical statistics at Limburg University in Belgium in 1994, she returned to Tartu for doctoral study, completing her Ph.D. in 1999.

She was a postdoctoral researcher at Ghent University in Belgium, and became an associate professor of public health at the University of Tartu in 2001, becoming a senior lecturer there in 2006. She worked as a senior researcher at the Estonian Genome Center at the University of Tartu from 2010 to 2018, when she became a professor of mathematical statistics. In 2021 she added a second affiliation with the Institute of Genomics.

== Recognition ==
In 2020, Fischer was elected to the Estonian Academy of Sciences.
