= Inés Alder =

Argentine cross-country skier (born 1970)

Personal information
- Born: 30 April 1970 (age 54); Bariloche, Argentina

Sport
- Sport: Cross-country skiing

Inés Alder dal Farra (born 30 April 1970) is an Argentine former cross-country skier. She competed in four events at the 1992 Winter Olympics. She is the mother of Franco and Marco Dal Farra. She is the sister of Guillermo Alder.
