= Erich Wilbrecht =

American biathlete (born 1961)

Personal information
- Born: November 12, 1961 (age 64) Marion, Illinois, United States

Sport
- Sport: Biathlon

Erich Wilbrecht (born November 12, 1961) is an American former biathlete. He competed in the men's sprint event at the 1992 Winter Olympics. Following his sporting career, Wilbrecht worked for Sotheby's International Realty.
