= Thomai Lefousi =

Greek alpine skier (born 1971)

Personal information
- Born: 14 March 1971 (age 55)

Sport
- Country: Greece
- Sport: Alpine Skiing
- Club: Alpin de Naoussa

Thomai Lefousi (born 14 March 1971) is a former Greek female alpine skier. She competed in the 1988, 1992 and 1994 Winter Olympics. She is also the elder sister of fellow Greek alpine skier, Thomas Lefousi.
