= German Karachevsky =

Russian cross-country skier

Personal information
- Nationality: Russian
- Born: 17 July 1968 (age 56)

Sport
- Sport: Cross-country skiing

German Karachevsky (born 17 July 1968) is a Russian cross-country skier. He competed in the men's 10 kilometre classical event at the 1992 Winter Olympics.
