= Gregor Grilc =

Slovenian alpine skier (born 1970)

Gregor Grilc (born 13 February 1970 in Šenčur) is a Slovenian former alpine skier who competed in the 1992 Winter Olympics and 1994 Winter Olympics.His best result in the Alpine skiing World Cup are 6th and 8th place, both in slalom. At the 1988 FIS Junior World Ski Championships, he won a gold medal in giant slalom.
