= Thomas Lefousi =

Greek alpine skier (born 1972)

Personal information
- Born: 5 May 1972 (age 54)

Sport
- Country: Greece
- Sport: Alpine Skiing
- Club: Alpin de Naoussa

Timolean "Thomas" Lefousi (born 5 May 1972) is a Greek male alpine skier. He competed at the 1992 Winter Olympics. He is also the younger brother of fellow Greek alpine skier, Thomai Lefousi.
