= Ricardo Campo =

Spanish alpine skier (born 1969)

Ricardo Campo (born 4 March 1969) is a Spanish former alpine skier who competed in the 1992 Winter Olympics.
