= Gáston Begue =

Argentine alpine skier (born 1972)

Personal information
- Born: 3 September 1972 (age 52); Ushuaia, Argentina

Sport
- Sport: Alpine skiing

Gáston Begue (born 3 September 1972) is an Argentine alpine skier. He competed at the 1992 Winter Olympics and the 1994 Winter Olympics.
