= Federico van Ditmar =

Argentine alpine skier (born 1969)

Personal information
- Born: 16 December 1969 (age 56) San Carlos de Bariloche, Argentina

Sport
- Sport: Alpine skiing

Federico van Ditmar (born 16 December 1969) is an Argentine alpine skier. He competed at the 1988, 1992 and the 1994 Winter Olympics.
