= Alejandro Guerra (biathlete) =

Argentine biathlete (born 1965)

Personal information
- Nationality: Argentine
- Born: 28 September 1965 (age 59)

Sport
- Sport: Biathlon

Alejandro Guerra (born 28 September 1965) is an Argentine biathlete. He competed in the men's sprint event at the 1992 Winter Olympics.
