= Erik Gogstad =

Norwegian bobsledder (born 1963)

Personal information
- Born: 7 May 1963 (age 63) Sandefjord, Norway

Sport
- Sport: Bobsleigh

Erik Christian Gogstad (born 7 May 1963) is a Norwegian bobsledder. He was born in Sandefjord, and represented the club Viking Bobklubb. He competed at the 1992 Winter Olympics in Albertville, in men's two together with Atle Norstad.
