= Atle Norstad =

Norwegian bobsledder

Personal information
- Born: 22 April 1961 (age 63); Sarpsborg, Norway

Sport
- Sport: Bobsleigh

Atle Norstad (born 22 April 1961) is a Norwegian bobsledder. He was born in Sarpsborg. He competed at the 1992 Winter Olympics in Albertville, in men's two together with Erik Gogstad.
