= Mustapha Tourki =

Moroccan cross-country skier (born 1966)

Personal information
- Nationality: Moroccan
- Born: 1 January 1966 (age 59)

Sport
- Sport: Cross-country skiing

Mustapha Tourki (born 1 January 1966) is a Moroccan cross-country skier. He competed in the men's 10 kilometre classical event at the 1992 Winter Olympics.
