= Anne Berge =

Norwegian alpine skier (born 1966)

Personal information
- Born: 31 January 1966 (age 59); Sandvika, Norway

Sport
- Sport: Alpine skiing

Anne Ragna Berge (born 31 January 1966) is a Norwegian alpine skier. She was born in Sandvika, and represented the club Stabæk IF. She competed at the 1992 Winter Olympics in Albertville. She won national titles in giant slalom in 1983 and 1994, and in alpine combined in 1989. Her 1994 title also earned her the Kongepokal trophy.
