= Agustín Neiman =

Argentine alpine skier (born 1972)

Personal information
- Born: 6 January 1972 (age 53); San Martín de los Andes, Argentina

Sport
- Sport: Alpine skiing

Agustín Neiman (born 6 January 1972) is an Argentine alpine skier. He competed in two events at the 1992 Winter Olympics.
