= Magne Johansen =

Norwegian ski jumper

Medal record

Men's ski jumping

Representing Norway

World Championships
Silver medal – second place	1989 Lahti	Team large hill

Magne Johansen (born 18 January 1965) is a Norwegian ski jumper who competed from 1987 to 1993. He won a silver medal in the team large hill event at the 1989 FIS Nordic World Ski Championships.

Johansen's best individual finish at the Winter Olympics was 18th in the individual normal hill at Albertville in 1992. He finished 13th in the 1992 Ski-flying World Championships. Johansen's best individual career finish was fourth in the normal hill in 1992 in St. Moritz. He competed for Byåsen I.L. in Trondheim.
