= Abraham Fernández =

Spanish alpine skier (born 1967)

Abraham Fernández Martínez (Note: In this Spanish name, the first or paternal surname is Fernández and the second or maternal family name is Martínez.) (born 1 June 1967 in Madrid) is a Spanish former alpine skier who competed in the 1992 Winter Olympics.
