= Tom Hansen (biathlete) =

Canadian biathlete

Tom Hansen (born 23 September 1968) is a Canadian former biathlete who competed in the 1992 Winter Olympics.

Hansen was born in Santa Barbara, California, United States.
