= Aleksander Peternel =

Slovenian freestyle skier (born 1964)

Personal information
- Nationality: Slovenian
- Born: 20 October 1964 (age 60); Kranjska Gora, Yugoslavia

Sport
- Sport: Freestyle skiing

Aleksander Peternel (born 20 October 1964) is a Slovenian freestyle skier. He competed in the men's moguls event at the 1992 Winter Olympics.
