= Emma Bosch =

Spanish alpine skier (1971–1994)

Emma Bosch Castell (Sabadell, 22 February 1971 – Sabadell, 26 March 1994) was a Spanish former alpine skier who competed in the 1992 Winter Olympics. She retired from alpine skiing in February 1994 due to a knee injury sustained two years before. On 26 March 1994 in the morning, Bosch had an epileptic seizure at her home in Sabadell, which resulted in a head injury of which she died the same day.
