= Mohamed Oubahim =

Moroccan cross-country skier (born 1959)

Personal information
- Nationality: Moroccan
- Born: 1 January 1959 (age 66)

Sport
- Sport: Cross-country skiing

Mohamed Oubahim (born 1 January 1959) is a Moroccan cross-country skier. He competed in the men's 10 kilometre classical event at the 1992 Winter Olympics.
