= Jorge Pujol =

Spanish alpine skier (born 1967)

Jorge Pujol (born 28 September 1967) is a Spanish former alpine skier who competed in the 1988 Winter Olympics and in the 1992 Winter Olympics.
