= Carlos Espiasse =

Argentine alpine skier (born 1972)

Personal information
- Born: 29 October 1972 (age 52); San Martín de los Andes, Argentina

Sport
- Sport: Alpine skiing

Carlos Espiasse (born 29 October 1972) is an Argentine alpine skier. He competed in two events at the 1992 Winter Olympics.
