= Marko Jemec =

Slovenian freestyle skier (born 1963)

Personal information
- Nationality: Slovenian
- Born: 3 August 1963 (age 61); Ljubljana, Yugoslavia

Sport
- Sport: Freestyle skiing

Marko Jemec (born 3 August 1963) is a Slovenian freestyle skier. He competed in the men's moguls event at the 1992 Winter Olympics.
