= Luka Klasinc =

Slovenian figure skater (born 2010)

Personal information
- Nationality: Slovenian
- Born: 7 March 1973 (age 53) Ljubljana, Yugoslavia

Sport
- Sport: Figure skating

Luka Klasinc (born 7 March 1973) is a Slovenian figure skater. He competed in the men's singles event at the 1992 Winter Olympics, finishing in 26th place.

In 2021, Klasinc was charged with bank fraud and identity theft after attempting to defraud the U.S. Small Business Administration of over $1.5 million.
