= Viorel Șotropa =

Romanian cross-country skier (1968–1993)

Personal information
- Nationality: Romanian
- Born: 5 March 1968 Siret, Romania
- Died: 1993

Sport
- Sport: Cross-country skiing

Viorel Șotropa (5 March 1968 – 1993) was a Romanian cross-country skier. He competed in the men's 10 kilometre classical event at the 1992 Winter Olympics.
