= Carlos Vicente (skier) =

Spanish cross-country skier (born 1971)

Personal information
- Nationality: Spanish
- Born: 18 November 1971 (age 54)

Sport
- Sport: Cross-country skiing

Carlos Vicente (born 18 November 1971) is a Spanish cross-country skier. He competed at the 1992 Winter Olympics and the 1994 Winter Olympics.

== Career ==
Vicente first appeared internationally in the 1990/91 season. At the 1991 Junior World Ski Championships in Reit im Winkl, he finished 25th over 10 km classical, 19th over 30 km freestyle and 15th in the relay. At the 1991 Nordic World Ski Championships in Val di Fiemme, he finished 64th over 15 km freestyle, 58th over 10 km classical and 14th in the relay.

At the 1992 Winter Olympics in Albertville, he placed 58th in the pursuit, 57th over 30 km classical and 56th over 10 km classical. He also finished 14th in the relay together with Jordi Ribó, Antonio Cascos and Juan Jesús Gutiérrez. The following year, at the 1993 Nordic World Ski Championships in Falun, he placed 55th over 30 km classical.

At the 1994 Winter Olympics in Lillehammer, he finished 44th over 10 km classical, 42nd over 50 km classical and 32nd in the pursuit.
