= Jure Velepec =

Slovenian biathlete (born 1965)

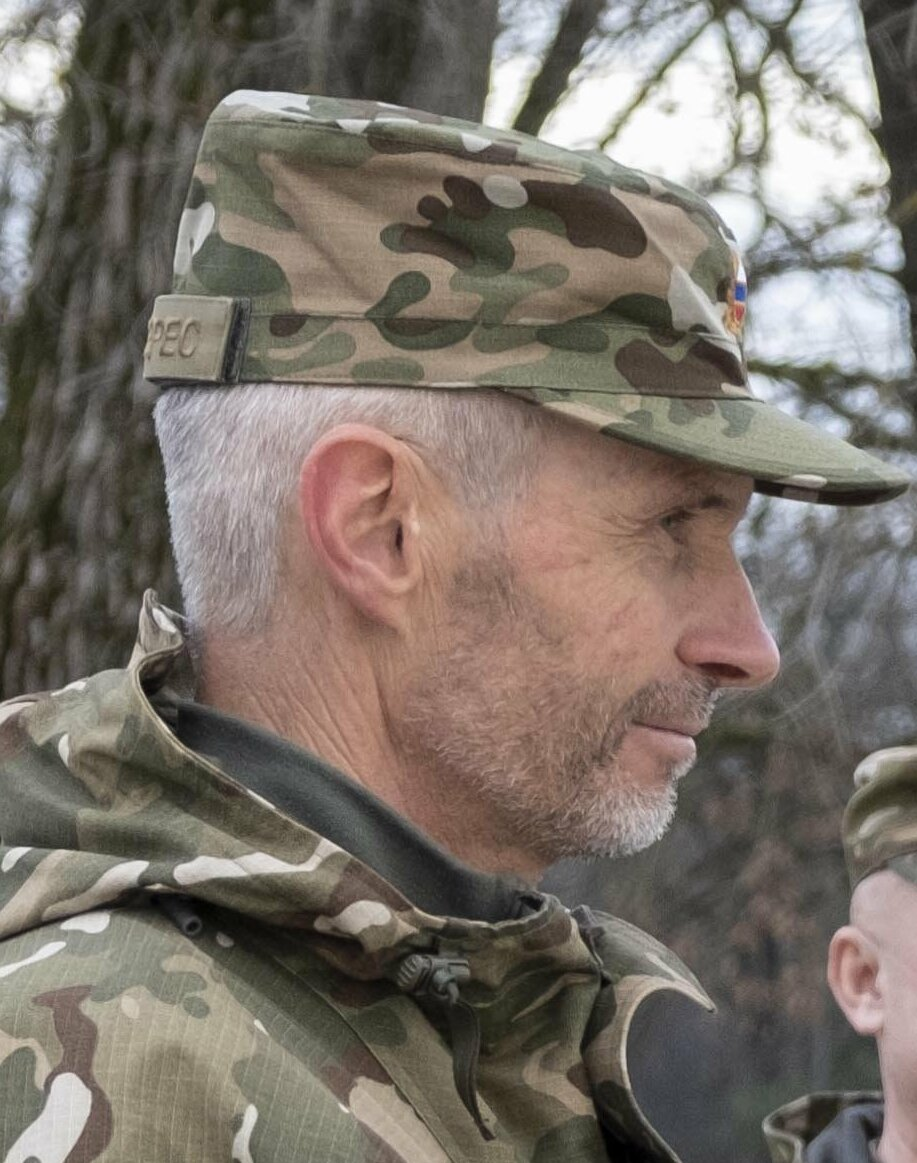

Personal information
- Nationality: Slovenian
- Born: 10 June 1965 (age 59); Ljubljana, Yugoslavia

Sport
- Sport: Biathlon

Jure Velepec (born 10 June 1965) is a Slovenian biathlete. He competed at the 1984, 1988, 1992 and the 1994 Winter Olympics.
