= Jiří Teplý =

Jiří Teplý (born 2 December 1962 in Nové Město na Moravě) was a Czech cross-country skier who competed from 1991 to 1995. Competing in two Winter Olympics, he earned his best career and individual finishes of eighth in the 4 × 10 km relay and 17th in the 30 km event, respectively, both at Lillehammer in 1994.

Teplý's best finish at the FIS Nordic World Ski Championships was 13th in the 50 km event at Val di Fiemme in 1991. His best World Cup finish was 11th in a 10 km event in Austria in 1992.

Teplý earned two individual career FIS Race wins (1993, 1994).
