= Juan Fernández (biathlete) =

Argentine biathlete (born 1963)

Personal information
- Nationality: Argentine
- Born: 17 September 1963 (age 61)

Sport
- Sport: Biathlon

Juan Fernández (born 17 September 1963) is an Argentine biathlete. He competed in the men's 20 km individual event at the 1992 Winter Olympics.
