= Son Chol-u =

North Korean cross-country skier

Personal information
- Nationality: North Korean
- Born: 3 March 1973 (age 52)

Sport
- Sport: Cross-country skiing

Son Chol-u (born 3 March 1973,Korean: 손철우) is a North Korean cross-country skier. He competed in the men's 10 kilometre classical event at the 1992 Winter Olympics.
