= Chang Song-rok =

North Korean cross-country skier (born 1969)

Personal information
- Full name: 장성록
- Nationality: North Korean
- Born: 7 January 1969 (age 56)

Sport
- Sport: Cross-country skiing

Chang Song-rok (born 7 January 1969) is a North Korean cross-country skier. He competed in the men's 10 kilometre classical event at the 1992 Winter Olympics.
