= Haukur Eiríksson =

Icelandic cross-country skier (born 1964)

Personal information
- Nationality: Icelandic
- Born: 10 March 1964 (age 61)

Sport
- Sport: Cross-country skiing

Haukur Eiríksson (born 10 March 1964) is an Icelandic cross-country skier. He competed in the men's 10 kilometre classical event at the 1992 Winter Olympics.
