= Sébastian Menci =

Argentine cross-country skier (born 1975)

Personal information
- Nationality: Argentine
- Born: 4 April 1975 (age 49)

Sport
- Sport: Cross-country skiing

Sébastian Menci (born 4 April 1975) is an Argentine cross-country skier. He competed in the men's 10 kilometre classical event at the 1992 Winter Olympics.
