= Boštjan Lekan =

Slovenian biathlete (born 1966)

Personal information
- Nationality: Slovenian
- Born: 20 January 1966 (age 59); Domžale, Yugoslavia

Sport
- Sport: Biathlon

Boštjan Lekan (born 20 January 1966) is a Slovenian biathlete. He competed at the 1992 Winter Olympics and the 1994 Winter Olympics.
