= Roberto Lucero =

Argentine biathlete (born 1966)

Personal information
- Nationality: Argentine
- Born: 24 November 1966 (age 58)

Sport
- Sport: Biathlon

Roberto Lucero (born 24 November 1966) is an Argentine biathlete. He competed in the men's 20 km individual event at the 1992 Winter Olympics.
