= Estonian Genome Project =

Institution and population-based biological database located in Estonia

Estonian Genome Center
- Founded: 2000
- Headquarters: Riia 23B, Tartu, Estonia
- Key people: Andres Metspalu (Director)
- Website: www.geenivaramu.ee

The Estonian Genome Project is a population-based biological database and biobank which was established in 2000 to improve public health in Estonia. It contains health records and biological specimens from a large percentage of the Estonian population.

== History ==
In June 2000 the Estonian Genome Foundation introduced the Estonian government to the Estonian Genome Project, and lobbied for legislative changes and government support to make the project possible. The project organizers invited input broadly from many sectors in planning to establish the EGF. The project was also presented as a cultural investment towards strengthening national identity by contributing to global research. At the time, many research teams were organizing similar projects, but this project was projected to be the world's largest.

An early goal of the project was to collect biological specimens and health data from 70% of Estonia's population of 1.4 million within its first 10 years. By 2004, the EGF had collected data from 10,000 people but faced fiscal reorganization as they and their primary financier, EGeen, dissolved their partnership. As of February 2014 the project had collected genes, questionnaire data on health (e.g. diet, lifestyle and clinical diagnoses) and GP standard health examinations from 52,000 adult gene donors and the aim had been adjusted downwards to collect genealogical, genome and health data from 5% of the population. The Estonian Genome Centre is based at the University of Tartu.
