= Gongoryn Myeryei =

Mongolian cross-country skier (born 1967)

Personal information
- Nationality: Mongolian
- Born: 31 July 1967 (age 57)

Sport
- Sport: Cross-country skiing

Gongoryn Myeryei (born 31 July 1967) is a Mongolian cross-country skier. He competed in the men's 10 kilometre classical event at the 1992 Winter Olympics.
