= Urmas Välbe =

Estonian cross-country skier (born 1966)

Urmas Välbe (born 8 November 1966 in Antsla) is a former Estonian cross-country skier. He currently works in a service team of the Estonian national cross-country skiing team.

Urmas Välbe was married to Russian cross-country skier Yelena Välbe. He remarried and got a daughter, Vibeke Marie Välbe, who competes in biathlon.

== Achievements ==
Year	Tournament	Venue	Sport	Event	Rank	Time
Representing Estonia
1992	Olympic Games	Albertville, France	Cross-country skiing	Men's 10 kilometres	28	30:20.1
1992	Olympic Games	Albertville, France	Cross-country skiing	Men's 30 kilometres	33	1-29:44.3
1992	Olympic Games	Albertville, France	Cross-country skiing	Men's 10/15 kilometres Pursuit	41	43:38.4
1992	Olympic Games	Albertville, France	Cross-country skiing	Men's 4×10 kilometres Relay	10	27:26.0
1994	Olympic Games	Lillehammer, Norway	Cross-country skiing	Men's 10 kilometres	42	26:58.4
1994	Olympic Games	Lillehammer, Norway	Cross-country skiing	Men's 30 kilometres	41	1-21:02.5
1994	Olympic Games	Lillehammer, Norway	Cross-country skiing	Men's 10/15 kilometres Pursuit	DNF	—
