= Taivo Kuus =

Estonian cross-country skier (born 1969)

Personal information
- Nationality: Estonian
- Born: 6 June 1969 (age 55); Otepää, Estonia

Sport
- Sport: Cross-country skiing

Taivo Kuus (born 6 June 1969) is an Estonian cross-country skier. He competed at the 1992 Winter Olympics and the 1994 Winter Olympics.
