= Ioannis Mitroulas =

Greek cross-country skier (born 1974)

Personal information
- Nationality: Greek
- Born: 19 March 1974 (age 51); Veria, Greece

Sport
- Sport: Cross-country skiing

Ioannis Mitroulas (born 19 March 1974) is a Greek cross-country skier. He competed in the men's 10 kilometre classical event at the 1992 Winter Olympics.
