= Andrzej Piotrowski (skier) =

Polish cross-country skier

Personal information
- Nationality: Polish
- Born: 12 August 1969 (age 55); Białystok, Poland

Sport
- Sport: Cross-country skiing

Andrzej Piotrowski (born 12 August 1969) is a Polish cross-country skier. He competed in the men's 10 kilometre classical event at the 1992 Winter Olympics.
