= Wiesław Cempa =

Polish cross-country skier

Personal information
- Nationality: Polish
- Born: 1 July 1970 (age 54); Nowy Sącz, Poland

Sport
- Sport: Cross-country skiing

Wiesław Cempa (born 1 July 1970) is a Polish cross-country skier. He competed in the men's 10 kilometre classical event at the 1992 Winter Olympics.
