= Kim Kwang-rae =

South Korean cross-country skier

Personal information
- Nationality: South Korean
- Born: 2 December 1973 (age 51)

Sport
- Sport: Cross-country skiing

Kim Kwang-rae (born 2 December 1973) is a South Korean cross-country skier. He competed in the men's 10 kilometre classical event at the 1992 Winter Olympics.
