= Momo Skokić =

Yugoslav cross-country skier (born 1968)

Personal information
- Nationality: Yugoslav
- Born: 1 July 1968 (age 58)

Sport
- Sport: Cross-country skiing

Children's. = Tijana, Savo i Sara

Momo Skokić (born 1 July 1968) is a Yugoslav cross-country skier. He competed in the men's 10 kilometre classical event at the 1992 Winter Olympics.
