= Al Pilcher =

Canadian cross-country skier

Al Pilcher (born 18 September 1969 in Orangeville, Ontario) is a Canadian former cross-country skier who competed in the 1988 Winter Olympics and in the 1992 Winter Olympics.
