= Uroš Velepec =

Slovenian biathlete (born 1967)

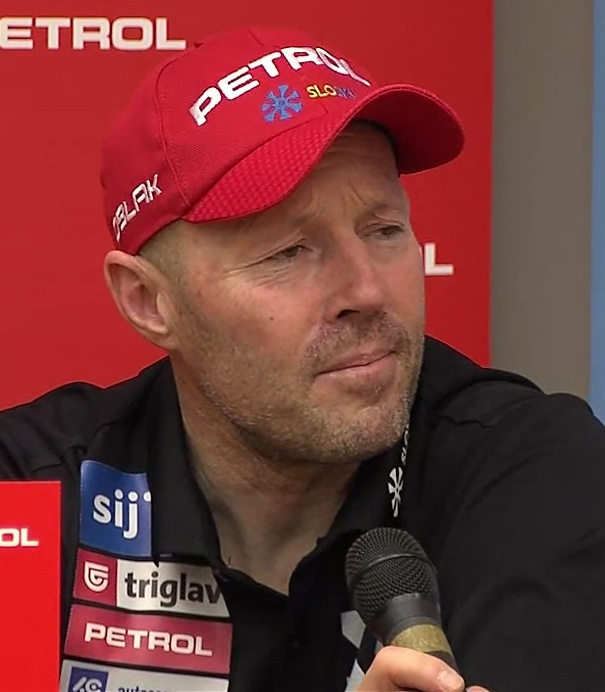
- Uroš Velepec in 2015

Personal information
- Nationality: Slovenian
- Born: 17 May 1967 (age 58) Dolsko, Yugoslavia

Sport
- Sport: Biathlon

Uroš Velepec (born 17 May 1967) is a Slovenian biathlete. He competed at the 1992 Winter Olympics and the 1994 Winter Olympics.
