= John Read (skier) =

British cross-country skier (born 1961)

Personal information
- Nationality: British
- Born: 2 October 1961 (age 63); Wincanton, England

Sport
- Sport: Cross-country skiing

John Read (born 2 October 1961) is a British cross-country skier. He competed in the men's 10 kilometre classical event at the 1992 Winter Olympics.
