= Janko Neuber =

German cross-country skier (born 1971)

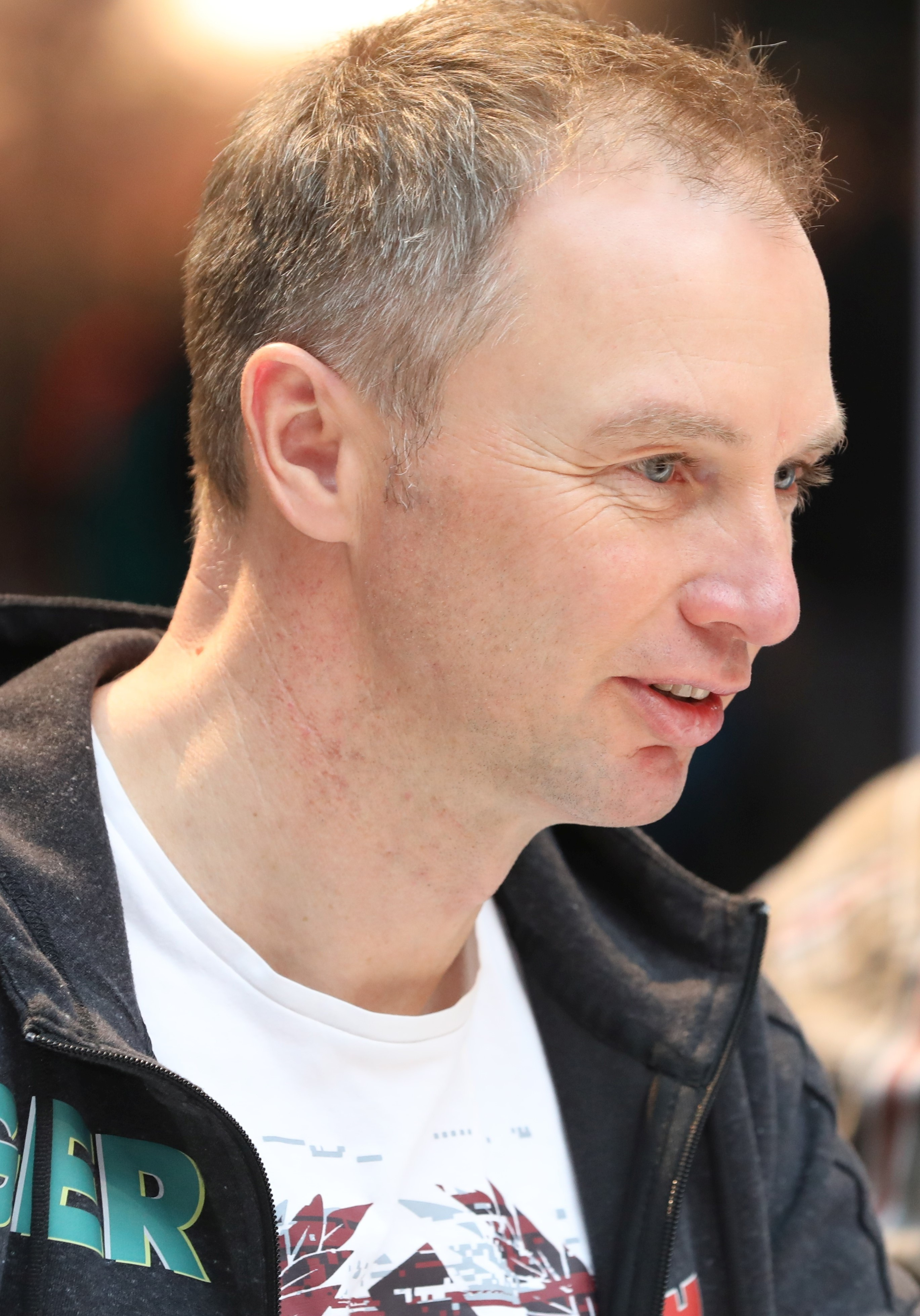
- Janko Neuber in 2018

Personal information
- Nationality: German
- Born: 25 June 1971 (age 53); Marienberg, East Germany

Sport
- Sport: Cross-country skiing

Janko Neuber (born 25 June 1971) is a German former cross-country skier. He competed at the 1992 Winter Olympics and the 1994 Winter Olympics.
