= Robert Kerštajn =

Slovenian cross-country skier

Personal information
- Nationality: Slovenian
- Born: 5 September 1967 (age 59) Kranjska Gora, Yugoslavia

Sport
- Sport: Cross-country skiing

Robert Kerštajn (born 5 September 1967) is a Slovenian cross-country skier. He competed in the men's 10 kilometre classical event at the 1992 Winter Olympics.
