= Jožko Kavalar =

Slovenian cross-country skier

Personal information
- Nationality: Slovenian
- Born: 9 May 1968 (age 56); Rateče, Yugoslavia

Sport
- Sport: Cross-country skiing

Jožko Kavalar (born 9 May 1968) is a Slovenian cross-country skier. He competed in the men's 10 kilometre classical event at the 1992 Winter Olympics.
