= Anthony Evans (skier) =

Australian cross-country skier (born 1969)

Personal information
- Born: 27 May 1969 (age 57) Orbost, Australia
- Height: 1.74 m (5 ft 9 in)
- Weight: 69 kg (152 lb)

Sport
- Sport: Cross-country skiing
- Club: Cooma Ski Club

Anthony Evans (born 27 May 1969) is a former Australian cross-country skier, who represented Australia at three Olympics from the 1992 Winter Olympics to the 1998 Winter Olympics.

At the 1992 Olympics, Evans competed in the 30 km classic, 15 km free pursuit and 10 km classic pursuit. He came 54th, 39th and 37th out of 82, 99 and 110 entrants. In 1994, he competed in the 50 km, 15 km free pursuit and 10 km classic. He came 47th, 57th and 51st out of 61, 74 and 88 entries. In 1994, he competed in the 50 km free pursuit, 30 km classic, 15 km free pursuit and 10 km classic. He came 48th, 51st, 55th and 66th out of 75, 72, 74 and 97 entries. His efforts in 1992 made him the first and only Australian to place in the top half.

In 2001, he married Carla Zijlstra, an Olympic speed skater from the Netherlands. They live in Jindabyne and have two daughters.
