= Timoleon Tsourekas =

Greek cross-country skier and coach

Personal information
- Nationality: Greek
- Born: 30 May 1970 (age 54); Metsovo, Greece

Sport
- Sport: Cross-country skiing

Timoleon Tsourekas (born 30 May 1970; Greek: Τιμολέων Τσουρέκας) is a Greek cross-country skier and coach affiliated to the Hellenic Winter Sports Federation.

== Biography ==
Timoleon Tsourekas was born on 30 May 1970 in Metsovo, Greece. He competed in the men's 10 kilometre classical event at the 1992 Winter Olympics. He is Technical Advisor of the Hellenic Winter Sports Federation. Tsourekas has been involved in the participation of Greece in every Olympics since 2002, either as Federal Coach or as Technical Advisor of the Greek mission.

Tsourekas was one of the two coaches of the Greek mission for the 2010 Winter Olympics in Vancouver, Canada. He was among the three coaches of the Greek mission for the 2014 Winter Olympics in Sochi, Russia. He was the coach for cross-country skiing of the Greek mission for the 2018 Winter Olympics in Pyeongchang, South Korea. Tsourekas was the main responsible for a series of reforms within competitive Greek skiing that helped Greece send a large number of athletes to the 2020 Winter Youth Olympics in Lausanne, Switzerland. He was one of the two cross-country skiing coaches of the Greek mission for the 2022 Winter Olympics in Beijing, China.

Apart from the Olympics, Tsourekas was also one of the three technicians of the Greek mission for the section of the 2015–16 FIS Cross-Country World Cup held at Falun, Sweden.
