= Yves Bilodeau =

Canadian cross-country skier

Yves Bilodeau (born 7 February 1962) is a Canadian former cross-country skier who competed at the 1988 Winter Olympics, the 1992 Winter Olympics and the 1998 Winter Olympics.
