= Ahn Jin-soo =

South Korean cross-country skier (born 1973)

Personal information
- Nationality: South Korea
- Born: 27 June 1973 (age 51); Kosung, South Korea
- Height: 1.78 m (5 ft 10 in)
- Weight: 70 kg (150 lb)

Sport
- Sport: Cross-country skiing

Ahn Jin-soo (born 27 June 1973) is a South Korean cross-country skier. He competed in the 1992, 1994, and 1998 Winter Olympics.
