= Rögnvaldur Ingþórsson =

Icelandic cross-country skier (born 1968)

Personal information
- Nationality: Icelandic
- Born: 20 May 1968 (age 56)

Sport
- Sport: Cross-country skiing

Rögnvaldur Ingþórsson (born 20 May 1968) is an Icelandic cross-country skier. He competed at the 1992 Winter Olympics and the 1994 Winter Olympics.
