= Michael Binzer =

Danish cross-country skier (born 1969)

Personal information
- Nationality: Danish
- Born: 3 January 1969 (age 56); Holbæk, Denmark

Sport
- Sport: Cross-country skiing

Michael Binzer (born 3 January 1969) is a Danish cross-country skier. He competed at the 1992 Winter Olympics, the 1994 Winter Olympics and the 1998 Winter Olympics.
