= Guillermo Alder =

Argentine cross-country skier (born 1971)

Personal information
- Born: 16 September 1971 (age 53); San Carlos de Bariloche, Argentina

Sport
- Sport: Cross-country skiing

Guillermo Alder (born 16 September 1971) is an Argentine cross-country skier. He competed in the men's 10 kilometre classical event at the 1992 Winter Olympics. He is brother of Inés Alder.
