= Ebbe Hartz =

Danish cross-country skier (born 1966)

Personal information
- Nationality: Danish
- Born: 11 March 1966 (age 59); Aarhus, Denmark

Sport
- Sport: Cross-country skiing

Ebbe Hartz (born 11 March 1966) is a Danish cross-country skier. He competed at the 1992 Winter Olympics and the 1994 Winter Olympics.
