= Ivan Smilenov =

Bulgarian cross-country skier (born 1966)

Personal information
- Nationality: Bulgarian
- Born: 4 April 1966 (age 58)

Sport
- Sport: Cross-country skiing

Ivan Smilenov (Bulgarian: Иван Смиленов; born 4 April 1966) is a Bulgarian cross-country skier. He competed at the 1988 Winter Olympics and the 1992 Winter Olympics.
