= Antonio Cascos =

Spanish cross-country skier (born 1963)

Personal information
- Nationality: Spanish
- Born: 21 December 1963 (age 61)

Sport
- Sport: Cross-country skiing

Antonio Cascos (born 21 December 1963) is a Spanish cross-country skier. He competed in the men's 10 kilometre classical event at the 1992 Winter Olympics.
