= Nikos Anastasiadis (skier) =

Greek skier (born 1966)

Personal information
- Nationality: Greek
- Born: 16 July 1966 (age 58); Naousa, Greece

Sport
- Sport: Biathlon, cross-country skiing

Nikos Anastasiadis (born 16 July 1966) is a Greek skier. He competed at the 1988 Winter Olympics, the 1992 Winter Olympics and the 1994 Winter Olympics.
