= Luis Argel =

Argentine skier (born 1959)

Personal information
- Nationality: Argentine
- Born: 1 February 1959 (age 66)

Sport
- Sport: Biathlon, cross-country skiing

Luis Argel (born 1 September 1959) is an Argentine skier. He competed at the 1988 Winter Olympics and the 1992 Winter Olympics.
