= Cross-country skiing at the 1992 Winter Olympics =

Cross-country skiing at the XVI Olympic Winter Games
- Venue: Les Saisies
- Date: 9–22 February
- No. of events: 10
- Competitors: 223 (139 men, 84 women) from 40 nations

The 1992 Winter Olympic games cross-country skiing results. The cross-country skiing competitions were held at Les Saisies, about 40 km from the host city Albertville.

== Evolution of the Olympic program ==
The combined pursuit (first classical, then freestyle, medals were awarded from both the classical part and the overall pursuit) was added in substitution of the men's 15 km and women's 10 km. Women's 30 km replaced the 20 km event. Also, women's 15 km was held for the first time.

== Medal summary ==
=== Medal table ===
Rank	Nation	Gold	Silver	Bronze	Total
1	Norway	5	3	1	9
2	Unified Team	3	2	4	9
3	Italy	1	4	3	8
4	Finland	1	1	1	3
5	Sweden	0	0	1	1
Totals (5 entries)		10	10	10	30

=== Participant NOCs ===
Forty nations sent ski runners to compete in the events.

- Argentina
- Australia
- Austria
- Bulgaria
- Canada
- China
- Croatia
- Czechoslovakia
- Denmark
- Estonia
- Finland
- France
- Germany
- Great Britain
- Greece
- Honduras
- Hungary
- Iceland
- Italy
- Japan
- Latvia
- Liechtenstein
- Lithuania
- Mexico
- Mongolia
- Morocco
- North Korea
- Norway
- Poland
- Romania
- San Marino
- Slovenia
- South Korea
- Spain
- Sweden
- Switzerland
- Turkey
- Unified Team
- United States
- Yugoslavia

=== Men's events ===
Event	Gold		Silver		Bronze	
10 km classical	Vegard Ulvang; Norway	27:36.0	Marco Albarello; Italy	27:55.2	Christer Majbäck; Sweden	27:56.4
15 km freestyle pursuit	Bjørn Dæhlie; Norway	1:05:37.9	Vegard Ulvang; Norway	1:06:31.3	Giorgio Vanzetta; Italy	1:06:32.3
30 km classical	Vegard Ulvang; Norway	1:22:27.8	Bjørn Dæhlie; Norway	1:23:14.0	Terje Langli; Norway	1:23:42.5
50 km freestyle	Bjørn Dæhlie; Norway	2:03:41.5	Maurilio De Zolt; Italy	2:04:39.1	Giorgio Vanzetta; Italy	2:06:42.1
4 × 10 km relay	Norway; Terje Langli; Vegard Ulvang; Kristen Skjeldal; Bjørn Dæhlie	1:39:26.0	Italy; Giuseppe Pulie; Marco Albarello; Giorgio Vanzetta; Silvio Fauner	1:40:52.7	Finland; Mika Kuusisto; Harri Kirvesniemi; Jari Räsänen; Jari Isometsä	1:41:22.9

=== Women's events ===
Event	Gold		Silver		Bronze	
5 km classical	Marjut Lukkarinen; Finland	14:13.8	Lyubov Yegorova; Unified Team	14:14.7	Yelena Välbe; Unified Team	14:22.7
10 km freestyle pursuit	Lyubov Yegorova; Unified Team	40:08.4	Stefania Belmondo; Italy	40:44.0	Yelena Välbe; Unified Team	40:52.7
15 km classical	Lyubov Yegorova; Unified Team	42:20.8	Marjut Lukkarinen; Finland	43:29.9	Yelena Välbe; Unified Team	43:42.3
30 km freestyle	Stefania Belmondo; Italy	1:22:30.1	Lyubov Yegorova; Unified Team	1:22:52.0	Yelena Välbe; Unified Team	1:24:13.9
4 × 5 km relay	Unified Team; Yelena Välbe; Raisa Smetanina; Larisa Lazutina; Lyubov Yegorova	59:34.8	Norway; Solveig Pedersen; Inger Helene Nybråten; Trude Dybendahl; Elin Nilsen	59:56.4	Italy; Bice Vanzetta; Manuela Di Centa; Gabriella Paruzzi; Stefania Belmondo	1:00:25.9

== See also ==
- Cross-country skiing at the 1992 Winter Paralympics
