= Wayne Dustin =

Canadian cross-country skier

Wayne Dustin (born 18 September 1965) is a Canadian former cross-country skier who competed in the 1988 Winter Olympics and in the 1992 Winter Olympics.
