= Juan Jesús Gutiérrez Cuevas =

Spanish cross-country skier (born 1969)

Juan Jesús Gutiérrez
Personal information
- Full name: Juan Jesús Gutiérrez Cuevas
- Born: 26 June 1969 (age 55); Reinosa, Cantabria, Spain
- Height: 176 cm (5 ft 9 in)
- Weight: 68 kg (150 lb)

Sport
- Country: Spain
- Sport: cross-country skiing

Juan Jesús Gutiérrez Cuevas (born 26 June 1969 in Reinosa, Cantabria) is a Spanish cross-country skier who competed from 1991 to 2006. His best World Cup finish was third at a marathon event in France in 2000.

Gutiérrez also competed in five Winter Olympics, earning his best finish of 17th in the 30 km event at Salt Lake City in 2002. His best finish at the FIS Nordic World Ski Championships was sixth in the 50 km event at Thunder Bay in 1995.
