= Jordi Ribó =

Spanish cross-country skier (born 1967)

Personal information
- Nationality: Spanish
- Born: 5 May 1967 (age 57); Seo de Urgel, Spain

Sport
- Sport: Cross-country skiing

Jordi Ribó (born 5 May 1967) is a Spanish cross-country skier. He competed at the 1988, 1992, 1994 and the 1998 Winter Olympics.
