= Alpine skiing at the 1992 Winter Olympics – Women's slalom =

Women's slalom at the XVI Olympic Winter Games
- Alpine skiing
- Venue: Meribel
- Date: February 20, 1992
- Competitors: 63 from 44 nations
- Winning time: 1:44.39

Medalists
1st place, gold medalist(s)		Petra Kronberger	Austria
2nd place, silver medalist(s)		Annelise Coberger	New Zealand
3rd place, bronze medalist(s)		Blanca Fernández Ochoa	Spain

The Women's slalom competition of the Albertville 1992 Olympics was held at Meribel.

The defending world champion was Vreni Schneider of Switzerland, who was also leader of the 1992 World Cup, while Petra Kronberger was the defending World Cup slalom champion.

== Results ==
Rank	Name	Country	Run 1	Run 2	Total	Difference
1st place, gold medalist(s)	Petra Kronberger	Austria	0:48.28	0:44.40	1:32.68	-
2nd place, silver medalist(s)	Annelise Coberger	New Zealand	0:49.02	0:44.08	1:33.10	+0.42
3rd place, bronze medalist(s)	Blanca Fernández Ochoa	Spain	0:48.25	0:45.10	1:33.35	+0.67
4	Julie Parisien	United States	0:48.22	0:45.18	1:33.40	+0.72
5	Karin Buder	Austria	0:49.10	0:44.58	1:33.68	+1.00
6	Patricia Chauvet	France	0:48.98	0:44.74	1:33.72	+1.04
7	Vreni Schneider	Switzerland	0:48.66	0:45.30	1:33.96	+1.28
8	Anne Berge	Norway	0:49.39	0:44.83	1:34.22	+1.54
9	Katrin Neuenschwander	Switzerland	0:49.20	0:45.08	1:34.28	+1.60
10	Urška Hrovat	Slovenia	0:49.04	0:45.46	1:34.50	+1.82
11	Kristina Andersson	Sweden	0:48.76	0:46.19	1:34.95	+2.27
12	Lara Magoni	Italy	0:49.73	0:45.27	1:35.00	+2.32
13	Christine von Grünigen	Switzerland	0:49.84	0:45.89	1:35.73	+3.05
14	Christelle Guignard	France	0:50.20	0:46.11	1:36.31	+3.63
15	Martina Ertl	Germany	0:50.29	0:46.12	1:36.41	+3.73
16	Katjuša Pušnik	Slovenia	0:50.06	0:46.39	1:36.45	+3.77
16	Lucia Medzihradská	Czechoslovakia	0:50.08	0:46.37	1:36.45	+3.77
18	Monique Pelletier	United States	0:50.38	0:46.25	1:36.63	+3.95
19	Emma Carrick-Anderson	Great Britain	0:50.91	0:46.67	1:37.58	+4.90
20	Heidi Voelker	United States	0:50.92	0:46.77	1:37.69	+5.01
21	Ylva Nowén	Sweden	0:50.92	0:46.92	1:37.84	+5.16
22	Merete Fjeldavlie	Norway	0:51.65	0:47.02	1:38.67	+5.99
23	Silvia del Rincón	Spain	0:51.02	0:48.20	1:39.22	+6.54
24	Ľudmila Milanová	Czechoslovakia	0:51.95	0:47.83	1:39.78	+7.10
25	Annie Laurendeau	Canada	0:52.01	0:48.02	1:40.03	+7.35
26	Ainhoa Ibarra	Spain	0:51.35	0:49.84	1:41.19	+8.51
27	Ásta Halldórsdóttir	Iceland	0:53.56	0:49.18	1:42.74	+10.06
28	Tine Kongsholm	Denmark	0:56.01	0:48.02	1:44.03	+11.35
29	Mihaela Fera	Romania	0:54.15	0:50.70	1:44.85	+12.17
30	Astrid Steverlynck	Argentina	0:54.83	0:50.70	1:45.53	+12.85
31	Marina Vidović	Yugoslavia	0:57.99	0:53.47	1:51.46	+18.78
32	Vera Gönczi	Hungary	0:59.97	0:55.36	1:55.33	+22.65
33	Liu Yali	China	1:03.44	0:58.00	2:01.44	+28.76
34	Vesna Dunimagloska	Yugoslavia	1:04.26	0:59.52	2:03.78	+31.10
35	Karolina Fotiadou	Cyprus	1:06.13	0:58.06	2:04.19	+31.51
36	Chus Cortina	Mexico	1:08.52	0:58.61	2:07.13	+34.45
37	Seba Johnson	Virgin Islands	1:08.65	1:01.11	2:09.76	+37.08
38	Choi Mi-ok	North Korea	1:09.00	1:02.05	2:11.05	+38.37
39	Li Xueqin	China	1:10.00	1:02.55	2:12.55	+39.87
40	Sammantha Teuscher	Mexico	1:11.04	1:03.83	2:14.87	+42.19
41	Nawal Slaoui	Morocco	1:08.85	1:08.22	2:17.07	+44.39
42	Verónica Ampudia	Mexico	1:16.45	1:08.40	2:24.85	+52.17
-	Nataša Bokal	Slovenia	0:48.62	DNF	-	-
-	Claudia Strobl	Austria	0:49.08	DNF	-	-
-	Monika Maierhofer	Austria	0:49.46	DNF	-	-
-	Annick Bonzon	Switzerland	0:49.94	DNF	-	-
-	Claire de Pourtales	Great Britain	0:50.60	DNF	-	-
-	Valerie Scott	Great Britain	0:53.15	DNF	-	-
-	Thomai Lefousi	Greece	0:57.16	DNF	-	-
-	Veronika Šarec	Slovenia	DNF	-	-	-
-	Florence Masnada	France	DNF	-	-	-
-	Pernilla Wiberg	Sweden	DNF	-	-	-
-	Eva Twardokens	United States	DNF	-	-	-
-	Bibiana Perez	Italy	DNF	-	-	-
-	Astrid Plank	Italy	DNF	-	-	-
-	Béatrice Filliol	France	DNF	-	-	-
-	Sachiko Yamamoto	Japan	DNF	-	-	-
-	Zali Steggall	Australia	DNF	-	-	-
-	Vicky Grau	Andorra	DNF	-	-	-
-	Ewa Zagata	Poland	DNF	-	-	-
-	Carolina Eiras	Argentina	DNF	-	-	-
-	Annamária Bónis	Hungary	DNF	-	-	-
-	Ghalia Sebti	Morocco	DNF	-	-	-
