= Alpine skiing at the 1992 Winter Olympics – Men's super-G =

Men's super-G at the XVI Olympic Winter Games
- Alpine skiing
- Venue: Val-d'Isère
- Date: 16 February 1992
- Competitors: 118 from 43 nations
- Winning time: 1:13.04

Medalists
1st place, gold medalist(s)		Kjetil André Aamodt	Norway
2nd place, silver medalist(s)		Marc Girardelli	Luxembourg
3rd place, bronze medalist(s)		Jan Einar Thorsen	Norway

Men's Super-G
- Location: Val d'Isère; Face de Bellevarde
- Vertical: 535 m (1,755 ft)
- Top elevation: 2,371 m (7,779 ft)
- Base elevation: 1,836 m (6,024 ft)

The men's super-G competition of the Albertville 1992 Olympics was held at Val-d'Isère on Sunday, 16 February.

The defending world champion was Stephan Eberharter of Austria, while Switzerland's Franz Heinzer was the defending World Cup super-G champion, and his countryman Paul Accola was leading the current season.

Norway captured three of the top four spots: Kjetil André Aamodt was the champion, Jan Einar Thorsen was the bronze medalist, and Ole Kristian Furuseth was fourth. Marc Girardelli of Luxembourg took the silver; Tom Stiansen, the fourth, and final, entrant of Norway, was eighth. Accola was tenth, Heinzer did not finish, and Eberharter was not selected for the Austrian Olympic team.

The Face de Bellevarde course started at an elevation of 2,371 m (7,779 ft) above sea level, with a vertical drop of 535 m (1,755 ft), and a course length of 1.650 km (1.03 mi). Aamodt's winning time was 73.04 seconds, yielding an average course speed of 81.325 km/h (50.5 mph), with an average vertical descent rate of 7.325 m/s (24.0 ft/s).

Aamodt became the first Scandinavian to win an Olympic alpine speed event. The medals were the first for Norway in alpine skiing in forty years, since Stein Eriksen won gold and silver on home country snow in 1952. Girardelli's silver was Luxembourg's first-ever Winter Olympic medal, and the country's first Olympic medal since Josy Barthel won gold in 1500 metres at the 1952 Summer Olympics.

== Results ==
The race was started at 11:30 local time (UTC +1). At the starting gate, the skies were clear, the temperature was −4.0 °C (25 °F), and the snow condition was hard; the temperature at the finish was at −3.0 °C (27 °F).

Rank	Bib	Name	Country	Time	Difference
1st place, gold medalist(s)	3	Kjetil André Aamodt	Norway	1:13.04	—
2nd place, silver medalist(s)	4	Marc Girardelli	Luxembourg	1:13.77	+0.73
3rd place, bronze medalist(s)	12	Jan Einar Thorsen	Norway	1:13.83	+0.79
4	7	Ole Kristian Furuseth	Norway	1:13.87	+0.83
5	16	Josef Polig	Italy	1:13.88	+0.84
6	2	Marco Hangl	Switzerland	1:13.90	+0.86
7	6	Günther Mader	Austria	1:14.08	+1.04
8	17	Tom Stiansen	Norway	1:14.51	+1.47
9	1	Markus Wasmeier	Germany	1:14.58	+1.54
10	5	Paul Accola	Switzerland	1:14.60	+1.56
11	26	Fredrik Nyberg	Sweden	1:14.61	+1.57
12	29	Gianfranco Martin	Italy	1:14.81	+1.77
13	23	Jeff Olson	United States	1:15.06	+2.02
14	10	Urs Kälin	Switzerland	1:15.22	+2.18
15	19	Rainer Salzgeber	Austria	1:15.31	+2.27
16	9	Luc Alphand	France	1:15.39	+2.35
17	27	Kyle Rasmussen	United States	1:15.58	+2.54
18	21	Patrick Ortlieb	Austria	1:15.66	+2.62
19	15	Alberto Senigagliesi	Italy	1:15.70	+2.66
20	41	Gregor Grilc	Slovenia	1:15.71	+2.67
21	11	Hansjörg Tauscher	Germany	1:15.98	+2.94
22	24	Konstantin Chistyakov	Unified Team	1:16.14	+3.10
23	28	A. J. Kitt	United States	1:16.31	+3.27
24	20	Hubert Strolz	Austria	1:16.36	+3.32
24	18	Jean-Luc Crétier	France	1:16.36	+3.32
26	34	Günther Marxer	Liechtenstein	1:16.48	+3.44
27	33	Mitja Kunc	Slovenia	1:16.49	+3.45
28	25	Tommy Moe	United States	1:16.54	+3.50
29	32	Jure Košir	Slovenia	1:16.56	+3.52
30	30	Steven Lee	Australia	1:16.58	+3.54
31	31	Berni Huber	Germany	1:16.78	+3.74
32	35	Paulo Oppliger	Chile	1:16.81	+3.77
33	83	Kiminobu Kimura	Japan	1:17.06	+4.02
34	46	Ricardo Campo	Spain	1:17.11	+4.07
35	60	Jorge Pujol	Spain	1:17.15	+4.11
36	42	Marco Büchel	Liechtenstein	1:17.25	+4.21
37	48	Marián Bíreš	Czechoslovakia	1:17.47	+4.43
38	45	Vicente Tomas	Spain	1:17.54	+4.50
39	52	Peter Jurko	Czechoslovakia	1:17.68	+4.64
40	37	Boris Duncan	Great Britain	1:17.76	+4.72
41	54	Takuya Ishioka	Japan	1:17.81	+4.77
42	40	Simon Wi Rutene	New Zealand	1:17.86	+4.82
43	58	Kristinn Björnsson	Iceland	1:17.89	+4.85
44	50	Gavin Forsyth	Great Britain	1:17.91	+4.87
45	56	Petar Dichev	Bulgaria	1:18.87	+5.83
46	62	Federico Van Ditmar	Argentina	1:19.07	+6.03
47	61	Ramon Rossell	Andorra	1:19.10	+6.06
48	63	Willy Raine	Canada	1:19.12	+6.08
49	53	Aleksey Maslov	Unified Team	1:19.71	+6.67
50	43	Martin Bell	Great Britain	1:19.74	+6.70
51	73	Örnólfur Valdimarsson	Iceland	1:20.64	+7.60
52	78	Borislav Dimitrachkov	Bulgaria	1:20.67	+7.63
53	44	Graham Bell	Great Britain	1:20.87	+7.83
54	68	Hur Seung-wook	South Korea	1:20.96	+7.92
55	77	Lothar Christian Munder	Brazil	1:21.07	+8.03
56	69	Attila Bónis	Hungary	1:21.10	+8.06
57	71	Pierre Kőszáli	Hungary	1:21.45	+8.41
58	80	Elias Majdalani	Lebanon	1:22.13	+9.09
59	64	Mauricio Rotella	Chile	1:22.30	+9.26
60	79	Agustín Neiman	Argentina	1:22.47	+9.43
61	74	Gáston Begue	Argentina	1:22.52	+9.48
62	72	Carlos Espiasse	Argentina	1:22.68	+9.64
63	110	Choi Yong-hee	South Korea	1:22.75	+9.71
64	66	Alexis Racloz	Chile	1:23.26	+10.22
65	81	Péter Kristály	Hungary	1:23.47	+10.43
66	75	Nicola Ercolani	San Marino	1:23.72	+10.68
67	112	Enis Bećirbegović	Yugoslavia	1:24.15	+11.11
68	89	Aurel Foiciuc	Romania	1:24.62	+11.58
69	76	Edin Terzić	Yugoslavia	1:24.70	+11.66
70	82	Hubertus von Hohenlohe	Mexico	1:24.79	+11.75
71	85	Thomas Lefousi	Greece	1:25.01	+11.97
72	99	Zoran Perušina	Yugoslavia	1:25.23	+12.19
73	92	Ioannis Kapraras	Greece	1:26.47	+13.43
74	86	John Campbell	Virgin Islands	1:26.83	+13.79
75	97	Sérgio Schuler	Brazil	1:27.41	+14.37
76	96	Marcelo Apovian	Brazil	1:27.87	+14.83
77	113	Taner Üstündağ	Turkey	1:28.24	+15.20
78	90	Lamine Guèye	Senegal	1:29.18	+16.14
79	100	Keith Fraser	Swaziland	1:29.39	+16.35
80	98	Sokratis Aristodimou	Cyprus	1:30.13	+17.09
81	101	Alekhis Fotiadis	Cyprus	1:30.31	+17.27
82	102	Yakup Kadri Birinci	Turkey	1:30.40	+17.36
83	114	Mourad Guerri	Algeria	1:32.76	+19.72
84	108	Andreas Vasili	Cyprus	1:32.78	+19.74
85	104	Íñigo Domenech	Mexico	1:35.29	+22.25
86	93	Hans Egger	Brazil	1:35.88	+22.84
87	118	Eduardo Ampudia	Mexico	1:36.86	+23.82
88	115	Cevdet Can	Turkey	1:37.97	+24.93
89	116	Brahim Ait Sibrahim	Morocco	1:38.60	+25.56
90	109	Kamel Guerri	Algeria	1:38.94	+25.90
91	111	El-Hassan Mahta	Morocco	1:41.06	+28.02
92	119	Brahim Id Abdellah	Morocco	1:49.65	+36.61
93	107	Brahim Izdag	Morocco	2:08.31	+55.27
-	8	Franz Heinzer	Switzerland	DNF	-
-	13	Franck Piccard	France	DNF	-
-	14	Patrick Holzer	Italy	DNF	-
-	22	Armand Schiele	France	DNF	-
-	36	Rob Crossan	Canada	DNF	-
-	38	Achim Vogt	Liechtenstein	DNF	-
-	39	Daniel Vogt	Liechtenstein	DNF	-
-	49	Tsuyoshi Tomii	Japan	DNF	-
-	51	Vitaly Andreyev	Unified Team	DNF	-
-	65	Vedran Pavlek	Croatia	DNF	-
-	70	Marcin Szafrański	Poland	DNF	-
-	84	Alphonse Gomis	Senegal	DNF	-
-	87	Carlos Mier y Terán	Mexico	DNF	-
-	88	Emilian Focşeneanu	Romania	DNF	-
-	94	Jason Gasperoni	San Marino	DNF	-
-	95	Balázs Tornay	Hungary	DNF	-
-	103	Tang Wei-Tsu	Chinese Taipei	DNF	-
-	105	Ahmet Demir	Turkey	DNF	-
-	106	Igor Latinović	Yugoslavia	DNF	-
-	117	Jakub Malczewski	Poland	DNF	-
-	47	Xavier Ubeira	Spain	DQ	-
-	55	Gerard Escoda	Andorra	DQ	-
-	57	Nahum Orobitg	Andorra	DQ	-
-	59	Lyubomir Popov	Bulgaria	DQ	-
-	67	Victor Gómez	Andorra	DQ	-
-	91	Stergios Pappos	Greece	DNS	-
