= Alpine skiing at the 1992 Winter Olympics – Women's giant slalom =

Women's giant slalom at the XVI Olympic Winter Games
- Alpine skiing
- Venue: Meribel
- Date: February 19, 1992
- Competitors: 69 from 32 nations
- Winning time: 2:12.74

Medalists
1st place, gold medalist(s)		Pernilla Wiberg	Sweden
2nd place, silver medalist(s)		Anita Wachter	Austria
2nd place, silver medalist(s)		Diann Roffe	United States

The Women's giant slalom competition of the Albertville 1992 Olympics was held at Meribel.

The defending world champion was Pernilla Wiberg of Sweden, while Switzerland's Vreni Schneider was the defending World Cup giant slalom champion and France's Carole Merle led the 1992 World Cup.

== Results ==
Rank	Name	Country	Run 1	Run 2	Total	Difference
1st place, gold medalist(s)	Pernilla Wiberg	Sweden	1:06.36	1:06.38	2:12.74	-
2nd place, silver medalist(s)	Anita Wachter	Austria	1:06.43	1:07.28	2:13.71	+0.97
2nd place, silver medalist(s)	Diann Roffe	United States	1:07.21	1:06.50	2:13.71	+0.97
4	Ulrike Maier	Austria	1:06.16	1:07.61	2:13.77	+1.03
5	Julie Parisien	United States	1:06.90	1:07.20	2:14.10	+1.36
6	Carole Merle	France	1:06.67	1:07.57	2:14.24	+1.50
7	Eva Twardokens	United States	1:07.03	1:07.44	2:14.47	+1.73
8	Katja Seizinger	Germany	1:07.40	1:07.56	2:14.96	+2.22
9	Sylvia Eder	Austria	1:07.20	1:07.85	2:15.05	+2.31
10	Kristina Andersson	Sweden	1:07.53	1:07.70	2:15.23	+2.49
11	Christina Meier-Höck	Germany	1:08.07	1:07.26	2:15.33	+2.59
12	Blanca Fernández Ochoa	Spain	1:08.09	1:07.32	2:15.41	+2.67
13	Nataša Bokal	Slovenia	1:07.20	1:08.44	2:15.64	+2.90
14	Traudl Hächer-Gavet	Germany	1:07.26	1:08.87	2:16.13	+3.39
15	Merete Fjeldavlie	Norway	1:08.66	1:08.57	2:17.23	+4.49
16	Barbara Merlin	Italy	1:08.47	1:08.85	2:17.32	+4.58
17	Corinne Rey-Bellet	Switzerland	1:08.89	1:08.70	2:17.59	+4.85
18	Zoë Haas	Switzerland	1:07.77	1:10.12	2:17.89	+5.15
19	Sophie Lefranc	France	1:09.54	1:09.13	2:18.67	+5.93
20	Lucia Medzihradská	Czechoslovakia	1:09.90	1:09.37	2:19.27	+6.53
21	Anne Berge	Norway	1:09.90	1:09.61	2:19.51	+6.77
22	Emma Carrick-Anderson	Great Britain	1:10.97	1:10.79	2:21.76	+9.02
23	Zali Steggall	Australia	1:10.54	1:11.66	2:22.20	+9.46
24	Ainhoa Ibarra	Spain	1:11.16	1:11.66	2:22.82	+10.08
24	Emma Bosch	Spain	1:11.78	1:11.04	2:22.82	+10.08
26	Silvia del Rincon	Spain	1:11.10	1:12.10	2:23.20	+10.46
27	Carolina Eiras	Argentina	1:12.55	1:13.36	2:25.91	+13.17
28	Mihaela Fera	Romania	1:13.91	1:14.67	2:28.58	+15.84
29	Ewa Zagata	Poland	1:14.56	1:14.86	2:29.42	+16.68
30	Ásta Halldórsdóttir	Iceland	1:14.55	1:15.84	2:30.39	+17.65
31	Tine Kongsholm	Denmark	1:13.82	1:17.18	2:31.00	+18.26
32	Astrid Steverlynck	Argentina	1:15.01	1:16.15	2:31.16	+18.42
33	Marina Vidović	Yugoslavia	1:16.72	1:16.46	2:33.18	+20.44
34	Annamária Bónis	Hungary	1:17.37	1:19.63	2:37.00	+24.26
35	Li Xueqin	China	1:19.88	1:25.91	2:45.79	+33.05
36	Chus Cortina	Mexico	1:23.68	1:23.36	2:47.04	+34.30
37	Seba Johnson	Virgin Islands	1:23.21	1:27.46	2:50.67	+37.93
38	Liu Yali	China	1:25.91	1:25.21	2:51.12	+38.38
39	Karolina Fotiadou	Cyprus	1:28.66	1:28.48	2:57.14	+44.40
40	Evelyn Schuler	Brazil	1:26.62	1:31.70	2:58.32	+45.58
41	Sammantha Teuscher	Mexico	1:30.18	1:32.50	3:02.68	+49.94
42	Nacera Boukamoum	Algeria	1:32.66	1:31.80	3:04.46	+51.72
43	Ghalia Sebti	Morocco	1:31.53	1:36.13	3:07.66	+54.92
44	Veronica Ampudia	Mexico	1:38.05	1:37.20	3:15.25	+62.51
-	Christelle Guignard	France	1:08.08	DNF	-	-
-	Ylva Nowén	Sweden	1:08.63	DNF	-	-
-	Michaela Gerg-Leitner	Germany	1:08.69	DNF	-	-
-	Katjuša Pušnik	Slovenia	1:08.99	DNF	-	-
-	Lara Magoni	Italy	1:09.13	DNF	-	-
-	Barbara Brlec	Slovenia	1:09.50	DNF	-	-
-	Edie Thys	United States	1:09.59	DNF	-	-
-	Emi Kawabata	Japan	1:10.44	DQ	-	-
-	Vera Gönczi	Hungary	1:18.75	DNF	-	-
-	Vesna Dunimagloska	Yugoslavia	1:24.02	DQ	-	-
-	Petra Kronberger	Austria	DNF	-	-	-
-	Vreni Schneider	Switzerland	DNF	-	-	-
-	Deborah Compagnoni	Italy	DNF	-	-	-
-	Bibiana Perez	Italy	DNF	-	-	-
-	Astrid Lødemel	Norway	DNF	-	-	-
-	Birgit Heeb-Batliner	Liechtenstein	DNF	-	-	-
-	Ľudmila Milanová	Czechoslovakia	DNF	-	-	-
-	Vicky Grau	Andorra	DNF	-	-	-
-	Debbie Pratt	Great Britain	DNF	-	-	-
-	Thomai Lefousi	Greece	DNF	-	-	-
-	Choi Mi-Ok	North Korea	DNF	-	-	-
-	Nawal Slaoui	Morocco	DNF	-	-	-
-	Heidi Zurbriggen	Switzerland	DQ	-	-	-
-	Cathy Chedal	France	DQ	-	-	-
-	Špela Pretnar	Slovenia	DQ	-	-	-
