= Great Britain at the 1992 Winter Olympics =

- Flag of the United Kingdom
- IOC code: GBR
- NOC: British Olympic Association

in Albertville
- Competitors: 49 (39 men, 10 women) in 9 sports
- Flag bearers: Wilf O'Reilly (opening); Mark Tout (closing)
- Medals Ranked 21st: Gold 0 Silver 0 Bronze 0 Total 0

Winter Olympics appearances (overview)
- 1924; 1928; 1932; 1936; 1948; 1952; 1956; 1960; 1964; 1968; 1972; 1976; 1980; 1984; 1988; 1992; 1994; 1998; 2002; 2006; 2010; 2014; 2018; 2022; 2026

The United Kingdom of Great Britain and Northern Ireland competed as Great Britain at the 1992 Winter Olympics in Albertville, France.

== Competitors ==
The following is the list of number of competitors in the Games.

Sport	Men	Women	Total
Alpine skiing	8	4	12
Biathlon	5	0	5
Bobsleigh	8	–	8
Cross-country skiing	4	0	4
Figure skating	3	4	7
Freestyle skiing	4	1	5
Luge	2	0	2
Short track speed skating	4	1	5
Speed skating	1	0	1
Total	39	10	49

== Alpine skiing ==
Men

Athlete	Event	Race 1	Race 2	Total	
Athlete	Event	Time	Time	Time	Rank
Graham Bell	Downhill			1:55.82	33
Ronald Duncan	Downhill			1:54.95	31
Martin Bell	Downhill			1:54.83	29
Graham Bell	Super-G			1:20.87	53
Martin Bell	Super-G			1:19.74	50
Gavin Forsyth	Super-G			1:17.91	44
Ronald Duncan	Super-G			1:17.76	40
Sean Langmuir	Giant Slalom	1:13.72	DNF	DNF	–
Gavin Forsyth	Giant Slalom	1:13.51	1:10.72	2:24.23	43
Bill Gaylord	Giant Slalom	1:12.04	1:08.62	2:20.66	40
Christopher Blagden	Slalom	DNF	–	DNF	–
Stephen Edwards	Slalom	DNF	–	DNF	–
Bill Gaylord	Slalom	58.88	DNF	DNF	–
Sean Langmuir	Slalom	58.04	57.69	1:55.73	34

Men's combined

Athlete	Downhill	Slalom		Total	
Athlete	Time	Time 1	Time 2	Points	Rank
Ronald Duncan	DNF	–	–	DNF	–
Sean Langmuir	1:54.61	53.55	55.30	142.32	28
Graham Bell	1:48.08	59.59	59.59	134.03	27
Martin Bell	1:47.48	57.24	1:00.86	121.83	25

Women

Athlete	Event	Race 1	Race 2	Total	
Athlete	Event	Time	Time	Time	Rank
Debbie Pratt	Super-G			DNF	–
Valerie Scott	Super-G			1:29.74	36
Debbie Pratt	Giant Slalom	DNF	–	DNF	–
Emma Carrick-Anderson	Giant Slalom	1:10.97	1:10.79	2:21.76	22
Valerie Scott	Slalom	53.15	DNF	DNF	–
Emma Carrick-Anderson	Slalom	50.91	46.67	1:37.58	19
Claire de Pourtales	Slalom	50.60	DNF	DNF	–

Women's combined

Athlete	Downhill	Slalom		Total	
Athlete	Time	Time 1	Time 2	Points	Rank
Valerie Scott	1:34.57	36.73	DNF	DNF	–
Emma Carrick-Anderson	1:32.79	36.00	35.84	107.61	17
Claire de Pourtales	1:32.52	DNF	–	DNF	–

== Biathlon ==
Men

Event	Athlete	Misses ^{1}	Time	Rank
10 km Sprint	Jason Sklenar	2	30:52.8	80
10 km Sprint	Ian Woods	5	30:11.8	72
10 km Sprint	Mike Dixon	2	29:19.4	60
10 km Sprint	Kenneth Rudd	1	29:11.1	58

Event	Athlete	Time	Misses	Adjusted time ^{2}	Rank
20 km	Paul Ryan	1'03:38.8	4	1'07:38.8	76
20 km	Jason Sklenar	1'01:28.9	4	1'05:28.9	67
20 km	Kenneth Rudd	1'00:09.1	5	1'05:09.1	65
20 km	Mike Dixon	59:20.2	0	59:20.2	12

Men's 4 x 7.5 km relay

Athletes	Race		
Athletes	Misses ^{1}	Time	Rank
Mike Dixon; Paul Ryan; Kenneth Rudd; Ian Woods	2	1'34:10.5	18

^{1} A penalty loop of 150 metres had to be skied per missed target.
^{2} One minute added per missed target.

== Bobsleigh ==
Sled	Athletes	Event	Run 1		Run 2		Run 3		Run 4		Total	
Sled	Athletes	Event	Time	Rank	Time	Rank	Time	Rank	Time	Rank	Time	Rank
GBR-1	Mark Tout; Lenny Paul	Two-man	1:00.10	1	1:01.10	8	1:01.44	9	1:01.23	5	4:03.87	6
GBR-2	Nick Phipps; George Farrell	Two-man	1:00.49	9	1:01.43	14	1:01.69	15	1:01.78	17	4:05.39	13

Sled	Athletes	Event	Run 1		Run 2		Run 3		Run 4		Total	
Sled	Athletes	Event	Time	Rank	Time	Rank	Time	Rank	Time	Rank	Time	Rank
GBR-1	Mark Tout; George Farrell; Paul Field; Lenny Paul	Four-man	58.49	8	58.87	12	58.73	9	58.80	5	3:54.89	7
GBR-2	Nick Phipps; Edd Horler; Colin Rattigan; David Armstrong	Four-man	58.86	15	58.83	8	59.29	16	58.93	11	3:55.91	13

== Cross-country skiing ==
Men

Event	Athlete	Race	
Event	Athlete	Time	Rank
10 km C	Mark Croasdale	36:13.0	90
10 km C	Glenn Scott	32:20.8	65
10 km C	Dave Belam	32:08.9	61
10 km C	John Read	31:32.7	47
15 km pursuit^{1} F	Glenn Scott	DNF	–
15 km pursuit^{1} F	Mark Croasdale	52:36.8	74
15 km pursuit^{1} F	John Read	46:52.4	64
15 km pursuit^{1} F	Dave Belam	46:11.0	57
30 km C	Glenn Scott	1'36:06.0	66
30 km C	John Read	1'34:37.5	62
30 km C	Dave Belam	1'33:15.6	56
50 km F	Mark Croasdale	DNF	–
50 km F	Glenn Scott	2'31:40.6	63
50 km F	Dave Belam	2'24:54.3	53

^{1} Starting delay based on 10 km results.
C = Classical style, F = Freestyle

== Curling ==
Curling was a demonstration sport at the 1992 Winter Olympics.

Great Britain
Castle Kennedy CC, Stranraer

Skip: Hammy McMillan
Third: Norman Brown
Second: Gordon Muirhead
Lead: Roger McIntyre
Alternate: Robert Kelly

== Figure skating ==
Men

Athlete	SP	FS	TFP	Rank
Steven Cousins	12	12	18.0	12

Women

Athlete	SP	FS	TFP	Rank
Suzanne Otterson	20	22	32.0	22
Joanne Conway	17	18	26.5	18

Pairs

Athletes	SP	FS	TFP	Rank
Kathryn Pritchard; Jason Briggs	17	17	25.5	17

Ice Dancing

Athletes	CD1	CD2	OD	FD	TFP	Rank
Melanie Bruce; Andrew Place	16	16	16	17	33.0	17

== Freestyle skiing ==
Men

Athlete	Event	Qualification			Final		
Athlete	Event	Time	Points	Rank	Time	Points	Rank
Simon Baynes	Moguls	42.41	7.86	44	did not advance		
Michael Liebreich	Moguls	35.32	17.84	32	did not advance		
Neil Munro	Moguls	37.78	19.82	26	did not advance		
Hugh Hutchison	Moguls	38.32	19.84	25	did not advance		

Women

Athlete	Event	Qualification			Final		
Athlete	Event	Time	Points	Rank	Time	Points	Rank
Jilly Curry	Moguls	44.97	16.86	15	did not advance		

== Luge ==
Men

Athlete	Run 1		Run 2		Run 3		Run 4		Total	
Athlete	Time	Rank	Time	Rank	Time	Rank	Time	Rank	Time	Rank
Ian Whitehead	46.814	26	47.121	27	47.613	27	47.356	25	3:08.904	27
Nick Ovett	46.517	22	46.456	22	47.256	24	47.173	23	3:07.403	23

== Short track speed skating ==
Men

Athlete	Event	Round one		Quarter-finals		Semi-finals		Finals	
Athlete	Event	Time	Rank	Time	Rank	Time	Rank	Time	Final rank
Nicky Gooch	1000 m	2:24.43	4	did not advance					
Matt Jasper	1000 m	1:36.82	1 Q	1:34.69	3	did not advance			
Wilf O'Reilly	1000 m	1:37.79	1 Q	1:33.62	1 Q	2:05.04	4 QB	1:36.24	5
Nicky Gooch; Stuart Horsepool; Matt Jasper; Wilf O'Reilly	5000 m relay			7:27.87	1 Q	7:29.40	3 QB	7:29.46	6

Women

Athlete	Event	Round one		Quarter-finals		Semi-finals		Finals	
Athlete	Event	Time	Rank	Time	Rank	Time	Rank	Time	Final rank
Debbie Palmer	500 m	52.24	4	did not advance					

== Speed skating ==
Men

Event	Athlete	Race	
Event	Athlete	Time	Rank
1000 m	Craig McNicoll	1:17.95	33
1500 m	Craig McNicoll	2:02.06	37
