= Yugoslavia at the 1992 Winter Olympics =

- Flag of SFR Yugoslavia
- IOC code: YUG
- NOC: Yugoslav Olympic Committee

in Albertville
- Competitors: 25 (22 men, 3 women) in 6 sports
- Medals: Gold 0 Silver 0 Bronze 0 Total 0

Winter Olympics appearances (overview)
- 1924; 1928; 1932; 1936; 1948; 1952; 1956; 1960; 1964; 1968; 1972; 1976; 1980; 1984; 1988; 1992; 1994; 1998; 2002

Other related appearances
- Croatia (1992–pres.); Slovenia (1992–pres.); Bosnia and Herzegovina (1994–pres.); North Macedonia (1998–pres.); Serbia and Montenegro (1998–2006); Montenegro (2010–pres.); Serbia (2010–pres.); Kosovo (2018–pres.)

Yugoslavia was represented at the 1992 Winter Olympics in Albertville, France by the Yugoslav Olympic Committee.

In total, 25 athletes including 22 men and three women represented Yugoslavia in six different sports including alpine skiing, biathlon, bobsleigh, cross-country skiing, luge and speed skating.

This was the last time that the Socialist Federal Republic of Yugoslavia would compete at the Winter Olympics following the breakup of Yugoslavia. As Croatia and Slovenia had already become independent and competed with separate teams for the first time in Albertville, the Yugoslav team consisted of athletes from three constituent republics that were still formally part of Yugoslavia (Bosnia and Herzegovina, Montenegro, and Serbia) as well as from Macedonia.

== Competitors ==
In total, 25 athletes represented Yugoslavia at the 1992 Winter Olympics in Albertville, France across six different sports.

Sport	Men	Women	Total
Alpine skiing	6	3	9
Biathlon	4	0	4
Bobsleigh	5	–	5
Cross-country skiing	3	0	3
Luge	2	0	2
Speed skating	2	0	2
Total	22	3	25

== Alpine skiing ==
In total, nine Yugoslav athletes participated in the alpine skiing events – Enis Bećirbegović, Arijana Boras, Vesna Dunimagloska, Rejmon Horo, Slađan Ilić, Igor Latinović, Zoran Perušina, Edin Terzić and Marina Vidović.

Men

Athlete	Event	Race 1	Race 2	Total	
Athlete	Event	Time	Time	Time	Rank
Igor Latinović	Super-G			DNF	–
Zoran Perušina	Super-G			1:25.23	72
Edin Terzić	Super-G			1:24.70	69
Enis Bećirbegović	Super-G			1:24.15	67
Igor Latinović	Giant Slalom	DSQ	–	DSQ	–
Enis Bećirbegović	Giant Slalom	DNF	–	DNF	–
Rejmon Horo	Giant Slalom	DNF	–	DNF	–
Zoran Perušina	Giant Slalom	1:18.95	1:17.07	2:36.02	58
Enis Bećirbegović	Slalom	DNF	–	DNF	–
Rejmon Horo	Slalom	DNF	–	DNF	–
Slađan Ilić	Slalom	1:11.48	1:08.59	2:20.07	46
Zoran Perušina	Slalom	1:01.43	1:03.11	2:04.54	42

Men's combined

Athlete	Downhill	Slalom		Total	
Athlete	Time	Time 1	Time 2	Points	Rank
Zoran Perušina	2:14.19	DNF	–	DNF	–
Edin Terzić	1:59.90	DNF	–	DNF	–
Igor Latinović	1:58.57	DNF	–	DNF	–

Women

Athlete	Event	Race 1	Race 2	Total	
Athlete	Event	Time	Time	Time	Rank
Marina Vidović	Super-G			1:34.35	41
Vesna Dunimagloska	Giant Slalom	1:24.02	DSQ	DSQ	–
Marina Vidović	Giant Slalom	1:16.72	1:16.46	2:33.18	33
Vesna Dunimagloska	Slalom	1:04.26	59.52	2:03.78	34
Marina Vidović	Slalom	57.99	53.47	1:51.46	31

Women's combined

Athlete	Downhill	Slalom		Total	
Athlete	Time	Time 1	Time 2	Points	Rank
Arijana Boras	DNF	–	–	DNF	–
Marina Vidović	1:35.82	DNF	–	DNF	–

== Biathlon ==
In total, four Yugoslav athletes participated in the biathlon events – Zoran Ćosić, Mladen Grujić, Admir Jamak and Tomislav Lopatić.

Men

Event	Athlete	Misses ^{1}	Time	Rank
10 km Sprint	Tomislav Lopatić	3	34:30.1	87
10 km Sprint	Zoran Ćosić	2	33:14.6	86
10 km Sprint	Admir Jamak	2	33:08.8	85
10 km Sprint	Mladen Grujić	3	30:27.6	76

Event	Athlete	Time	Misses	Adjusted time ^{2}	Rank
20 km	Tomislav Lopatić	1'06:35.8	8	1'14:35.8	85
20 km	Admir Jamak	1'14:09.6	0	1'14:09.6	84
20 km	Zoran Ćosić	1'05:12.8	4	1'09:12.8	81
20 km	Mladen Grujić	1'02:40.6	6	1'08:40.6	79

Men's 4 × 7.5 km relay

Athletes	Race		
Athletes	Misses ^{1}	Time	Rank
Mladen Grujić; Tomislav Lopatić; Zoran Ćosić; Admir Jamak	0	1'38:40.2	19

^{1}A penalty loop of 150 metres had to be skied per missed target.
^{2}One minute added per missed target.

== Bobsleigh ==
In total, five Yugoslav athletes participated in the bobsleigh events – Miro Pandurević, Dragiša Jovanović, Ognjen Sokolović, Zdravko Stojnić and Borislav Vujadinović.

Sled	Athletes	Event	Run 1		Run 2		Run 3		Run 4		Total	
Sled	Athletes	Event	Time	Rank	Time	Rank	Time	Rank	Time	Rank	Time	Rank
YUG-1	Borislav Vujadinović; Miro Pandurević	Two-man	1:02.22	29	1:02.43	29	1:02.73	30	1:02.73	30	4:10.11	29
YUG-2	Dragiša Jovanović; Ognjen Sokolović	Two-man	1:02.67	35	1:02.97	34	1:02.94	33	1:02.81	32	4:11.39	34

Sled	Athletes	Event	Run 1		Run 2		Run 3		Run 4		Total	
Sled	Athletes	Event	Time	Rank	Time	Rank	Time	Rank	Time	Rank	Time	Rank
YUG-1	Zdravko Stojnić; Dragiša Jovanović; Miro Pandurević; Ognjen Sokolović	Four-man	1:00.16	26	1:00.28	24	1:00.59	26	1:00.27	24	4:01.30	24

== Cross-country skiing ==
In total, three Yugoslav athletes participated in the cross-country skiing events – Bekim Babić, Aleksandar Milenković and Momo Skokić.

Men

Event	Athlete	Race	
Event	Athlete	Time	Rank
10 km C	Bekim Babić	37:55.9	101
10 km C	Momo Skokić	36:48.4	94
10 km C	Aleksandar Milenković	35:47.0	87
15 km pursuit^{1} F	Momo Skokić	DNF	–
15 km pursuit^{1} F	Bekim Babić	56:34.8	89
15 km pursuit^{1} F	Aleksandar Milenković	52:38.8	75
30 km C	Momo Skokić	DNF	–
30 km C	Bekim Babić	2'06:09.4	82
30 km C	Aleksandar Milenković	1'57:57.4	80
50 km F	Momo Skokić	DNF	–
50 km F	Aleksandar Milenković	2'34:31.1	65

^{1} Starting delay based on 10 km results.
C = Classical style, F = Freestyle

== Luge ==
In total, two Yugoslav athletes participated in the luge events – Ismar Biogradlić and Igor Špirić.

Men

Athlete	Run 1		Run 2		Run 3		Run 4		Total	
Athlete	Time	Rank	Time	Rank	Time	Rank	Time	Rank	Time	Rank
Ismar Biogradlić	48.997	34	48.570	34	49.783	34	49.305	34	3:16.655	34
Igor Špirić	48.261	33	47.947	33	48.707	33	48.508	30	3:13.423	33

== Speed skating ==
In total, two Yugoslav athletes participated in the speed skating events – Bajro Čenanović and Slavenko Likić.

Men

Event	Athlete	Race	
Event	Athlete	Time	Rank
500 m	Slavenko Likić	43.81	43
500 m	Bajro Čenanović	43.09	42
1000 m	Slavenko Likić	1:28.57	43
1500 m	Bajro Čenanović	2:12.09	45
5000 m	Bajro Čenanović	8:20.30	36

== See also ==
- Croatia at the 1992 Winter Olympics
- Slovenia at the 1992 Winter Olympics
