= Biathlon at the 1992 Winter Olympics – Men's relay =

Men's biathlon relay at the XVI Olympic Winter Games
- Pictogram for biathlon
- Venue: Les Saisies
- Dates: 16 February 1992
- Competitors: 84 from 21 nations
- Winning time: 1:24:43.5

Medalists
1st place, gold medalist(s)		Germany; Ricco Groß; Jens Steinigen; Mark Kirchner; Fritz Fischer
2nd place, silver medalist(s)		Unified Team; Valeriy Medvedtsev; Alexandr Popov; Valery Kiriyenko; Sergei Tchepikov
3rd place, bronze medalist(s)		Sweden; Ulf Johansson; Leif Andersson; Tord Wiksten; Mikael Löfgren

The Men's 4 × 7.5 kilometre biathlon relay competition at the 1992 Winter Olympics was held on 16 February at Les Saisies. Each national team consisted of four members, with each skiing 7.5 kilometres and shooting twice, once prone and once standing.

At each shooting station, a competitor has eight shots to hit five targets; however, only five bullets are loaded in a magazine at one - if additional shots are required, the spare bullets must be loaded one at a time. If after the eight shots are taken, there are still targets not yet hit, the competitor must ski a 150-metre penalty loop.

== Results ==
Rank	Bib	Team	Penalties	Result	Deficit
1st place, gold medalist(s)	8	Germany; Ricco Groß; Jens Steinigen; Mark Kirchner; Fritz Fischer	0 0; 0 0; 0 0; 0 0; 0 0	1:24:43.5; 22:37.4; 21:00.9; 20:17.5; 20:47.7	
2nd place, silver medalist(s)	1	Unified Team; Valeriy Medvedtsev; Alexandr Popov; Valery Kiriyenko; Sergei Tchepikov	0 0; 0 0; 0 0; 0 0; 0 0	1:25:06.3; 21:56.3; 21:01.2; 21:11.7; 20:57.1	+22.8
3rd place, bronze medalist(s)	4	Sweden; Ulf Johansson; Leif Andersson; Tord Wiksten; Mikael Löfgren	0 0; 0 0; 0 0; 0 0; 0 0	1:25:38.2; 21:53.3; 21:03.1; 22:05.5; 20:36.3	+54.7
4	3	Italy; Hubert Leitgeb; Johann Passler; Pieralberto Carrara; Andreas Zingerle	0 2; 0 0; 0 2; 0 0; 0 0	1:26:18.1; 22:01.6; 21:37.8; 21:24.6 <21:14.1	+1:34.6
5	2	Norway; Geir Einang; Frode Løberg; Gisle Fenne; Eirik Kvalfoss	0 1; 0 0; 0 0; 0 0; 0 1	1:26:32.4; 22:07.5; 21:01.6; 21:00.5; 22:22.8	+1:48.9
6	7	France; Xavier Blond; Thierry Gerbier; Christian Dumont; Hervé Flandin	0 0; 0 0; 0 0; 0 0; 0 0	1:27:13.3; 23:07.6; 21:26.4; 21:41.1; 20:58.2	+2:29.8
7	15	Czechoslovakia; Martin Rypl; Tomáš Kos; Jiří Holubec; Ivan Masařík	0 1; 0 0; 0 0; 0 1; 0 0	1:27:15.7; 22:00.5; 21:10.2; 22:22.6; 21:42.4	+2:32.2
8	5	Finland; Vesa Hietalahti; Jaakko Niemi; Harri Eloranta; Kari Kataja	0 1; 0 0; 0 1; 0 0; 0 0	1:27:39.5; 21:36.9; 23:17.1; 21:24.9; 21:20.6	+2:56.0
9	6	Poland; Dariusz Kozłowski; Jan Ziemianin; Jan Wojtas; Krzysztof Sosna	0 0; 0 0; 0 0; 0 0; 0 0	1:27:56.7; 22:45.6; 21:21.0; 22:11.2; 21:38.9	+3:13.2
10	10	Canada; Glenn Rupertus; Jean Paquet; Tony Fiala; Steve Cyr	0 0; 0 0; 0 0; 0 0; 0 0	1:29:37.3; 21:58.8; 22:49.7; 22:00.0; 22:48.8	+4:53.8
11	13	Estonia; Hillar Zahkna; Aivo Udras; Kalju Ojaste; Urmas Kaldvee	0 0; 0 0; 0 0; 0 0; 0 0	1:29:46.1; 22:34.3; 22:02.0; 22:26.6; 22:43.2	+5:02.6
12	12	Austria; Bruno Hofstätter; Egon Leitner; Ludwig Gredler; Franz Schuler	0 2; 0 0; 0 1; 0 0; 0 1	1:30:40.7; 22:22.8; 23:46.9; 21:37.9; 22:53.1	+5:57.2
13	20	United States; Jon Engen; Duncan Douglas; Josh Thompson; Curt Schreiner	0 1; 0 0; 0 1; 0 0; 0 0	1:30:44.0; 22:55.1; 23:21.2; 22:12.0; 22:15.7	+6:00.5
14	11	Bulgaria; Krasimir Videnov; Khristo Vodenicharov; Spas Gulev; Spas Zlatev	0 0; 0 0; 0 0; 0 0; 0 0	1:31:49.6; 21:57.1; 23:53.5; 22:58.8; 23:00.2	+7:06.1
15	16	Hungary; János Panyik; László Farkas; Gábor Mayer; Tibor Géczi	0 2; 0 0; 0 2; 0 0; 0 0	1:32:50.7; 21:57.8; 23:51.1; 24:35.3; 22:26.5	+8:07.2
16	9	Latvia; Oļegs Maļuhins; Aivars Bogdanovs; Ilmārs Bricis; Gundars Upenieks	0 3; 0 2; 0 0; 0 1; 0 0	1:33:31.1; 24:47.4; 22:29.4; 23:46.7; 22:27.6	+8:47.6
17	17	China; Tan Hongbin; Tang Guoliang; Wang Weiyi; Song Wenbin	0 1; 0 0; 0 0; 0 0; 0 1	1:33:52.4; 23:39.2; 23:42.9; 22:11.0; 24:19.3	+9:08.9
18	19	Great Britain; Mike Dixon; Paul Ryan; Kenneth Rudd; Ian Woods	2 0; 2 0; 0 0; 0 0; 0 0	1:34:10.5; 24:16.8; 23:53.8; 24:03.9; 25:42.8	+9:27.0
19	18	Yugoslavia; Mladen Grujić; Tomislav Lopatić; Zoran Ćosić; Admir Jamak	0 0; 0 0; 0 0; 0 0; 0 0	1:38:40.2; 23:30.2; 25:23.3; 24:03.9; 25:42.8	+13:56.7
20	21	Slovenia; Uroš Velepec; Sašo Grajf; Jure Velepec; Janez Ožbolt	6 0; 5 0; 1 0; 0 0; 0 0	1:39:03.2; 32:15.5; 22:26.9; 22:05.2; 22:15.6	+14:19.7
21	14	South Korea; Kim Woon-ki; Hong Byung-sik; Jang Dong-lin; Han Myung-hee	1 0; 0 0; 0 0; 1 0; 0 0	1:47:24.4; 27:16.6; 25:26.3; 27:44.9; 26:56.6	+22:40.9
