= Great Britain at the 1994 Winter Olympics =

- Flag of the United Kingdom
- IOC code: GBR
- NOC: British Olympic Association

in Lillehammer
- Competitors: 32 in 8 sports
- Flag bearers: Michael Dixon (opening); Nicky Gooch (closing)
- Medals Ranked 21st: Gold 0 Silver 0 Bronze 2 Total 2

Winter Olympics appearances (overview)
- 1924; 1928; 1932; 1936; 1948; 1952; 1956; 1960; 1964; 1968; 1972; 1976; 1980; 1984; 1988; 1992; 1994; 1998; 2002; 2006; 2010; 2014; 2018; 2022; 2026

The United Kingdom of Great Britain and Northern Ireland competed as Great Britain at the 1994 Winter Olympics in Lillehammer, Norway.

== Medallists ==
| Medal | Name | Sport | Event | Date |
|---|---|---|---|---|
| Bronze | Jayne Torvill; Christopher Dean | Figure skating | Ice dance | 21 February |
| Bronze | Nicky Gooch | Short track speed skating | Men's 500 metres | 26 February |

== Competitors ==
The following is the list of number of competitors in the Games.

| Sport | Men | Women | Total |
|---|---|---|---|
| Alpine skiing | 4 | 2 | 6 |
| Biathlon | 4 | 0 | 4 |
| Bobsleigh | 8 | – | 8 |
| Cross-country skiing | 1 | 0 | 1 |
| Figure skating | 3 | 3 | 6 |
| Freestyle skiing | 2 | 1 | 3 |
| Luge | 1 | 0 | 1 |
| Short track speed skating | 2 | 1 | 3 |
| Total | 25 | 7 | 32 |

== Alpine skiing ==
Men

| Athlete | Event | Final | | | | |
| Athlete | Event | Run 1 | Run 2 | Run 3 | Total | Rank |
|---|---|---|---|---|---|---|
| Graham Bell | Downhill | | | | 1:47.39 | 26 |
| Graham Bell | Super-G | | | | DNF | |
| Graham Bell | Combined | 1:38.94 | DNS | | DNF | |
| Martin Bell | Downhill | | | | 1:47.49 | 28 |
| Bill Gaylord | Giant Slalom | 1:33.58 | DQ | | DQ | |
| Bill Gaylord | Slalom | DNF | | | DNF | |
| Bill Gaylord | Combined | DNF | | | DNF | |
| Spencer Pession | Super-G | | | | DNF | |
| Spencer Pession | Giant Slalom | 1:33.94 | 1:28.68 | | 3:02.62 | 31 |

Women

| Athlete | Event | Final | | | | |
| Athlete | Event | Run 1 | Run 2 | Run 3 | Total | Rank |
|---|---|---|---|---|---|---|
| Emma Carrick-Anderson | Giant Slalom | DNF | | | DNF | |
| Emma Carrick-Anderson | Slalom | DNF | | | DNF | |
| Claire de Pourtales | Slalom | DNF | | | DNF | |

== Biathlon ==
Men

| Athlete | Event | Final | | |
| Athlete | Event | Time | Pen. | Rank |
|---|---|---|---|---|
| Mike Dixon | 20 km Individual | 1:03:44.0 | 1 | 54 |
| Kenneth Rudd | 10 km Sprint | 34:19.7 | 4 | 67 |
| Ian Woods | 10 km Sprint | 31:58.3 | 2 | 49 |
| Ian Woods | 20 km Individual | 1:03:44.0 | 3 | 54 |
| Mike Dixon; Ian Woods; Mark Gee; Kenneth Rudd | 4 × 7.5 km relay | 1:39:16.0 | 0 | 17 |

== Bobsleigh ==
| Athlete | Event | Final | | | | | |
| Athlete | Event | Run 1 | Run 2 | Run 3 | Run 4 | Total | Rank |
|---|---|---|---|---|---|---|---|
| Sean Olsson; Paul Field | Two-man | 52.86 | 53.30 | 53.21 | 53.46 | 3:32.83 | 10 |
| Mark Tout; Lenny Paul | Two-man | 52.77 | 53.15 | 52.99 | 53.24 | 3:32.15 | 6 |
| Sean Olsson; John Herbert; Dean Ward; Paul Field | Four-man | 52.23 | 52.45 | 52.26 | 52.47 | 3:29.41 | 8 |
| Mark Tout; George Farrell; Jason Wing; Lennox Paul | Four-man | 52.03 | 52.24 | 52.14 | 52.46 | 3:28.87 | 5 |

== Cross-country skiing ==
Men

| Athlete | Event | Final | | | | | |
| Athlete | Event | Start | Rank | Time | Rank | Total | Rank |
|---|---|---|---|---|---|---|---|
| Dave Belam | 10 km Classical | | | | | 28:00.2 | 68 |
| Dave Belam | 15 km Free Pursuit | +03:40 | 68 | 41:17.8 | 64 | +9:09.0 | 63 |
| Dave Belam | 30 km Free | | | | | 1:24:28.2 | 60 |

== Figure skating ==
Men

| Athlete | Final | | | | |
| Athlete | Short Program | Rank | Free Skating | Total | Rank |
|---|---|---|---|---|---|
| Steven Cousins | 3.5 | 7 | 9.0 | 12.5 | 9 |

Women

| Athlete | Final | | | | |
| Athlete | Short Program | Rank | Free Skating | Total | Rank |
|---|---|---|---|---|---|
| Charlene von Saher | 6.5 | 1 | 16.0 | 22.5 | 15 |

Pairs

| Athlete | Final | | | | |
| Athlete | Short Program | Rank | Free Skating | Total | Rank |
|---|---|---|---|---|---|
| Jacqueline Soames; John Jenkins | 8.0 | 16 | 15.0 | 23.0 | 15 |

Ice Dancing

| Athlete | Final | | | | | | | | |
| Athlete | Compulsory Dance 1 | Rank | Compulsory Dance 2 | Rank | Original Dance | Rank | Free Dance | Total | Rank |
|---|---|---|---|---|---|---|---|---|---|
| Jayne Torvill; Christopher Dean | 0.6 | 3 | 0.6 | 3 | 0.6 | 1 | 3.0 | 4.8 | 3rd place, bronze medalist(s) |

== Freestyle skiing ==
Men

| Athlete | Event | Qualifying | | Final | |
| Athlete | Event | Points | Rank | Points | Rank |
|---|---|---|---|---|---|
| Richard Cobbing | Aerials | 208.54 | 5 Q | 196.58 | 10 |
| Hugh Hutchison | Moguls | 22.27 | 25 | Did Not Advance | |

Women

| Athlete | Event | Qualifying | | Final | |
| Athlete | Event | Points | Rank | Points | Rank |
|---|---|---|---|---|---|
| Jilly Curry | Aerials | 74.21 | 21 | Did Not Advance | |

== Luge ==
Men

| Athlete | Event | Final | | | | | |
| Athlete | Event | Run 1 | Run 2 | Run 3 | Run 4 | Total | Rank |
|---|---|---|---|---|---|---|---|
| Paul Hix | Singles | 52.410 | 52.398 | 52.073 | 52.234 | 3:29.115 | 26 |

== Short track speed skating ==
Men

| Athlete | Event | Heats | | Quarter-finals | | Semi-finals | | Final | |
| Athlete | Event | Time | Rank | Time | Rank | Time | Rank | Time | Rank |
|---|---|---|---|---|---|---|---|---|---|
| Nicky Gooch | 500 metres | 44.03 | 1st | 44.25 | 2nd | 44.40 | 2nd | 43.68 | 3rd place, bronze medalist(s) |
| Nicky Gooch | 1000 metres | 1:32.05 | 2nd | 1:32.00 | 2nd | 1:31.77 | 2nd | DQ | |
| Wilf O'Reilly | 500 metres | 46.41 | 4th | Ranking Round | | | | | 27th |
| Wilf O'Reilly | 1000 metres | 1:33.57 | 3rd | Ranking Round | | | | | 22nd |

Women

| Athlete | Event | Heats | | Quarter-finals | | Semi-finals | | Final | |
| Athlete | Event | Time | Rank | Time | Rank | Time | Rank | Time | Rank |
|---|---|---|---|---|---|---|---|---|---|
| Debbie Palmer | 500 metres | 47.93 | 4th | Ranking Round | | | | | 25th |
| Debbie Palmer | 1000 metres | 1:44.72 | 3rd | Ranking Round | | | | | 20th |
