= Morocco at the 1992 Winter Olympics =

- IOC code: MAR
- NOC: Moroccan Olympic Committee
- Website: www.cnom.org.ma (in French)

in Albertville
- Competitors: 12 in 2 sports
- Medals: Gold 0 Silver 0 Bronze 0 Total 0

Winter Olympics appearances (overview)
- 1968; 1972–1980; 1984; 1988; 1992; 1994–2006; 2010; 2014; 2018; 2022; 2026

Morocco was represented at the 1992 Winter Olympics in Albertville, France by the Moroccan Olympic Committee.

In total, 12 athletes including 10 men and two women represented Morocco in two different sports including alpine skiing and cross-country skiing.

== Competitors ==
In total, 12 athletes represented Morocco at the 1992 Winter Olympics in Albertville, France across two different sports.

Sport	Men	Women	Total
Alpine skiing	7	2	9
Cross-country skiing	3	0	3
Total	10	2	12

== Alpine skiing ==
In total, nine Moroccan athletes participated in the alpine skiing events – Brahim Ait Sibrahim, Noureddine Bouchaal, Hicham Diddou, Brahim Id Abdellah, Brahim Izdag, El-Hassan Mahta, Mustapha Naitlhou, Ghalia Sebti and Nawal Slaoui.

The men's super-G took place on 16 February 1992. Ait Sibrahim completed the course in a time of one minute 38.6 seconds to finish 89th overall. Mahta completed the course in a time of one minute 41.06 seconds to finish 91st overall. Id Abdellah completed the course in a time of one minute 49.65 seconds to finish 92nd overall. Izdag completed the course in a time of two minutes 8.31 seconds to finish 93rd overall.

The men's giant slalom took place on 18 February 1992. Ait Sibrahim completed his first run in a time of one minute 26.81 seconds and his second run in a time of one minute 27.41 seconds. His combined time of two minutes 54.22 seconds saw him finish 78th overall. Naitlhou completed his first run in a time of one minute 38.11 seconds and his second run in a time of one minute 39.21 seconds. His combined time of three minutes 17.32 seconds saw him finish 84th overall. Bouchaal completed his first run in a time of one minute 38.4 seconds and his second run in a time of one minute 43.9 seconds. His combined time of three minutes 22.2 seconds saw him finish 86th overall. Mahta was disqualified following his first run.

The men's slalom took place on 22 February 1992. Ait Sibrahim completed his first run in a time of one minute 15.13 seconds and his second run in a time of one minute 14.87 seconds. His combined time of two minutes 30 seconds saw him finish 52nd overall. Mahta completed his first run in a time of one minute 29.74 seconds and his second run in a time of one minute 27.72 seconds. His combined time of two minutes 57.46 seconds saw him finish 60th overall. Diddou completed his first run in a time of one minute 25.01 seconds. He did not finish his second run. Izdag did not finish his first run.

Men

Athlete	Event	Run 1 (DH)		Run 2 (Sl)		Run 3 (Sl)		Final/Total		
Athlete	Event	Time	Rank	Time	Rank	Time	Rank	Time	Diff	Rank
Brahim Ait Sibrahim	Super-G	—N/a						1:38.60	+25.56	89
Brahim Ait Sibrahim	Giant slalom	1:26.81	93	1:27.41	78	—N/a		2:54.22	+47.24	78
Brahim Ait Sibrahim	Slalom	1:15.13	67	1:14.87	54	—N/a		2:30.00	+45.61	52
Brahim Id Abdellah	Super-G	—N/a						1:49.65	+36.61	92
Brahim Izdag	Super-G	—N/a						2:08.31	+55.27	93
Brahim Izdag	Slalom	did not finish				—N/a		did not finish		
El-Hassan Mahta	Super-G	—N/a						1:41.06	+28.02	91
El-Hassan Mahta	Giant slalom	Disqualified				—N/a		Disqualified		
El-Hassan Mahta	Slalom	1:29.74	74	1:27.72	60	—N/a		2:57.46	+73.07	60
Noureddine Bouchaal	Giant slalom	1:38.40	106	1:43.90	85	—N/a		3:22.30	+75.32	86
Mustapha Naitlhou	Giant slalom	1:38.11	105	1:39.21	84	—N/a		3:17.32	+70.34	84
Hicham Diddou	Slalom	1:25.01	71	did not advance		—N/a		did not advance		

The women's super-G took place on 18 February 1992. Slaoui was disqualified.

The women's giant slalom took place on 19 February 1992. Sebti completed her first run in a time of one minute 31.53 seconds and her second run in a time of one minute 36.13 seconds. Her combined time of three minutes 7.66 seconds saw her finish 43rd overall. Slaoui did not finish.

The women's slalom took place on 20 February 1992. Slaoui completed her first run in a time of one minute 8.85 seconds and her second run in a time of one minute 8.22 seconds. Her combined time of two minutes 17.07 seconds saw her finish 41st overall. Sebti did not finish.

Women

Athlete	Event	Run 1 (DH)		Run 2 (Sl)		Run 3 (Sl)		Final/Total		
Athlete	Event	Time	Rank	Time	Rank	Time	Rank	Time	Diff	Rank
Nawal Slaoui	Super-G	—N/a						Disqualified		
Nawal Slaoui	Giant slalom	did not finish				—N/a		did not finish		
Nawal Slaoui	Slalom	1:08.85	45	1:08.22	41	—N/a		2:17.07	+44.39	41
Ghalia Sebti	Giant slalom	1:31.53	52	1:36.13	43	—N/a		3:07.66	+54.92	43
Ghalia Sebti	Slalom	did not finish				—N/a		did not finish		

== Cross-country skiing ==
In total, three Moroccan athletes participated in the cross-country skiing events – Faissal Cherradi, Mohamed Oubahim and Mustapha Tourki in the men's 10 km classical and the men's 15 km freestyle pursuit.

The men's 10 km classical took place on 13 February 1992. Tourki completed the course in a time of 46 minutes 15.1 seconds to finish 107th overall. Oubahim completed the course in a time of 47 minutes 32.6 seconds to finish 108th overall. Cherradi completed the course in a time of one hour 11 minutes 7.4 seconds to finish 110th overall.

The men's 15 km freestyle pursuit took place on 13 February 1992. Tourki completed the course in a time of one hour 21 minutes 33.1 seconds to finish 96th overall. Oubahim completed the course in a time of one hour 35 minutes 32.2 seconds to finish 98th overall. Cherradi completed the course in a time of two hours 27 minutes 37.8 seconds to finish 99th overall.

Men

Athlete	Event	Race	
Athlete	Event	Time	Rank
Faissal Cherradi	10 km classical	1:11:07.4	110
Faissal Cherradi	15 km freestyle pursuit	2:27:37.8	99
Mohamed Oubahim	10 km classical	47:32.6	108
Mohamed Oubahim	15 km freestyle pursuit	2:03:08.2	98
Mustapha Tourki	10 km classical	46:15.1	107
Mustapha Tourki	15 km freestyle pursuit	1:49:09.1	96
