= Canada at the 1992 Winter Olympics =

- IOC code: CAN
- NOC: Canadian Olympic Committee
- Website: www.olympic.ca (in English and French)

in Albertville, France 9 February 1992 – 23 February 1992
- Competitors: 108 (79 men, 29 women) in 11 sports
- Flag bearer: Sylvie Daigle (short track speed skating)
- Medals Ranked 9th: Gold 2 Silver 3 Bronze 2 Total 7

Winter Olympics appearances (overview)
- 1924; 1928; 1932; 1936; 1948; 1952; 1956; 1960; 1964; 1968; 1972; 1976; 1980; 1984; 1988; 1992; 1994; 1998; 2002; 2006; 2010; 2014; 2018; 2022; 2026

Canada competed at the 1992 Winter Olympics in Albertville, France.

== Medalists ==
Medal	Name	Sport	Event	Date
Gold	Kerrin Lee-Gartner	Alpine skiing	Women's downhill	15 February
Gold	Angela Cutrone; Sylvie Daigle; Nathalie Lambert; Annie Perreault	Short track speed skating	Women's 3000 metre relay	20 February
Silver	Frédéric Blackburn	Short track speed skating	Men's 1000 metres	20 February
Silver	Frédéric Blackburn; Laurent Daignault; Michel Daignault; Sylvain Gagnon	Short track speed skating	Men's 5000 metre relay	22 February
Silver	Canada men's national ice hockey team: Dave Archibald; Todd Brost; Sean Burke; Kevin Dahl; Curtis Giles; Dave Hannan; Gordon Hynes; Brian Tutt; Fabian Joseph; Joe Juneau; Trevor Kidd; Patrick Lebeau; Chris Lindberg; Eric Lindros; Kent Manderville; Jason Woolley; Adrien Plavsic; Dan Ratushny; Sam Saint-Laurent; Brad Schlegel; Wally Schreiber; Randy Smith; Dave Tippett	Ice hockey	Men's tournament	23 February
Bronze	Isabelle Brasseur; Lloyd Eisler	Figure skating	Pairs	11 February
Bronze	Myriam Bedard	Biathlon	Women's individual	19 February

== Competitors ==
The following is the list of number of competitors in the Games.

Sport	Men	Women	Total
Alpine skiing	7	3	10
Biathlon	5	4	9
Bobsleigh	9	–	9
Cross-country skiing	6	5	11
Figure skating	7	6	13
Freestyle skiing	4	3	7
Ice hockey	22	–	22
Luge	5	1	6
Short track speed skating	5	4	9
Ski jumping	3	–	3
Speed skating	6	3	9
Total	79	29	108

== Alpine skiing ==
Men

Athlete	Event	Race 1	Race 2	Total	
Athlete	Event	Time	Time	Time	Rank
Cary Mullen	Downhill			DSQ	–
Roman Torn	Downhill			DNF	–
Brian Stemmle	Downhill			1:53.77	23
Felix Belczyk	Downhill			1:53.37	18
Rob Crossan	Super-G			DNF	–
Willy Raine	Super-G			1:19.12	48
Willy Raine	Giant Slalom	1:11.30	1:08.76	2:20.06	39
Rob Crossan	Giant Slalom	1:10.69	1:07.88	2:18.57	35
Willy Raine	Slalom	56.80	56.52	1:53.32	29
Brad King	Slalom	56.42	DNF	DNF	–
Rob Crossan	Slalom	55.21	54.65	1:49.86	20

Men's combined

Athlete	Downhill	Slalom		Total	
Athlete	Time	Time 1	Time 2	Points	Rank
Rob Crossan	1:48.33	50.77	54.35	57.27	12
Felix Belczyk	1:47.75	DNF	–	DNF	–
Cary Mullen	1:47.47	52.65	54.93	62.37	14

Women

Athlete	Event	Race 1	Race 2	Total	
Athlete	Event	Time	Time	Time	Rank
Michelle McKendry-Ruthven	Downhill			1:55.61	20
Kerrin Lee-Gartner	Downhill			1:52.55	1st place, gold medalist(s)
Michelle McKendry-Ruthven	Super-G			1:25.43	20
Kerrin Lee-Gartner	Super-G			1:23.76	6
Annie Laurendeau	Slalom	52.01	48.02	1:40.03	25

Women's combined

Athlete	Downhill	Slalom		Total	
Athlete	Time	Time 1	Time 2	Points	Rank
Michelle McKendry-Ruthven	1:27.32	35.67	36.12	39.02	6
Kerrin Lee-Gartner	1:26.49	DSQ	–	DSQ	–

== Biathlon ==
Men

Event	Athlete	Misses ^{1}	Time	Rank
10 km Sprint	Tom Hansen	2	32:03.1	83
10 km Sprint	Tony Fiala	2	29:35.0	62
10 km Sprint	Glenn Rupertus	3	28:43.3	52
10 km Sprint	Steve Cyr	0	26:46.4	8

Event	Athlete	Time	Misses	Adjusted time ^{2}	Rank
20 km	Jean Paquet	59:36.2	9	1'08:36.2	77
20 km	Steve Cyr	59:06.9	4	1'03:06.9	46
20 km	Tony Fiala	59:39.8	1	1'00:39.8	26
20 km	Glenn Rupertus	59:18.3	1	1'00:18.3	20

Men's 4 x 7.5 km relay

Athletes	Race		
Athletes	Misses ^{1}	Time	Rank
Glenn Rupertus; Jean Paquet; Tony Fiala; Steve Cyr	0	1'29:73.3	10

Women

Event	Athlete	Misses ^{1}	Time	Rank
7.5 km Sprint	Yvonne Visser	4	29:35.9	59
7.5 km Sprint	Jane Isakson	1	28:39.7	50
7.5 km Sprint	Lise Meloche	2	28:24.7	47
7.5 km Sprint	Myriam Bédard	1	26:04.6	12

Event	Athlete	Time	Misses	Adjusted time ^{2}	Rank
15 km	Jane Isakson	57:06.5	4	1'01:06.5	54
15 km	Yvonne Visser	55:38.2	5	1'00:38.2	52
15 km	Lise Meloche	55:10.4	5	1'00:10.4	50
15 km	Myriam Bédard	50:15.0	2	52:15.0	3rd place, bronze medalist(s)

Women's 3 x 7.5 km relay

Athletes	Race		
Athletes	Misses ^{1}	Time	Rank
Lise Meloche; Myriam Bédard; Jane Isakson	2	1'23:49.1	11

^{1} A penalty loop of 150 metres had to be skied per missed target.
^{2} One minute added per missed target.

== Bobsleigh ==
Sled	Athletes	Event	Run 1		Run 2		Run 3		Run 4		Total	
Sled	Athletes	Event	Time	Rank	Time	Rank	Time	Rank	Time	Rank	Time	Rank
CAN-1	Greg Haydenluck; Dave MacEachern	Two-man	1:00.69	11	1:01.09	7	1:01.57	14	1:01.49	13	4:04.84	11
CAN-2	Dennis Marineau; Chris Farstad	Two-man	1:00.19	2	1:01.36	12	1:01.18	6	1:01.35	9	4:04.08	9

Sled	Athletes	Event	Run 1		Run 2		Run 3		Run 4		Total	
Sled	Athletes	Event	Time	Rank	Time	Rank	Time	Rank	Time	Rank	Time	Rank
CAN-1	Chris Lori; Ken LeBlanc; Cal Langford; Dave MacEachern	Four-man	58.00	3	58.71	3	58.66	6	58.87	7	3:54.24	4
CAN-2	Dennis Marineau; Chris Farstad; Jack Pyc; Sheridon Baptiste	Four-man	58.61	11	59.00	15	DSQ	–	–	–	DSQ	–

== Cross-country skiing ==
Men

Event	Athlete	Race	
Event	Athlete	Time	Rank
10 km C	Wayne Dustin	32:16.9	64
10 km C	Al Pilcher	31:44.8	52
10 km C	Yves Bilodeau	31:19.5	42
10 km C	Dany Bouchard	30:03.8	25
15 km pursuit^{1} F	Wayne Dustin	46:04.6	56
15 km pursuit^{1} F	Al Pilcher	45:44.6	52
15 km pursuit^{1} F	Yves Bilodeau	44:22.4	45
15 km pursuit^{1} F	Dany Bouchard	43:31.1	40
30 km C	Alain Masson	1'34:22.0	60
30 km C	Yves Bilodeau	1'34:18.3	59
30 km C	Wayne Dustin	1'31:58.2	48
30 km C	Al Pilcher	1'31:49.3	45
50 km F	Alain Masson	DNF	–
50 km F	Darren Derochie	2'29:42.0	61
50 km F	Wayne Dustin	2'20:24.6	46

^{1} Starting delay based on 10 km results.
C = Classical style, F = Freestyle

Men's 4 × 10 km relay

Athletes	Race	
Athletes	Time	Rank
Dany Bouchard; Wayne Dustin; Yves Bilodeau; Darren Derochie	1'47:52.0	11

Women

Event	Athlete	Race	
Event	Athlete	Time	Rank
5 km C	Jane Vincent	16:47.6	53
5 km C	Lucy Steele	16:07.8	46
5 km C	Rhonda DeLong	15:59.4	41
5 km C	Angela Schmidt-Foster	15:56.0	39
10 km pursuit^{2} F	Angela Schmidt-Foster	32:30.1	51
10 km pursuit^{2} F	Jane Vincent	32:10.7	49
10 km pursuit^{2} F	Rhonda DeLong	31:01.8	40
10 km pursuit^{2} F	Lucy Steele	30:57.4	39
15 km C	Rhonda DeLong	49:49.7	43
15 km C	Lorna Sasseville	49:18.1	40
15 km C	Angela Schmidt-Foster	46:55.0	29
30 km F	Lorna Sasseville	1'38:27.3	51
30 km F	Jane Vincent	1'35:10.0	40
30 km F	Lucy Steele	1'33:35.7	33

^{2} Starting delay based on 5 km results.
C = Classical style, F = Freestyle

Women's 4 × 5 km relay

Athletes	Race	
Athletes	Time	Rank
Angela Schmidt-Foster; Rhonda DeLong; Jane Vincent; Lucy Steele	1'03:38.5	11

== Curling ==
Curling was a demonstration sport at the 1992 Winter Olympics.

Canada
Avonair CC, Edmonton

Skip: Kevin Martin
Third: Kevin Park
Second: Dan Petryk
Lead: Don Bartlett
Alternate: Jules Owchar

== Figure skating ==
Men

Athlete	SP	FS	TFP	Rank
Michael Slipchuk	8	9	13.0	9
Elvis Stojko	6	7	10.0	7
Kurt Browning	4	6	8.0	6

Women

Athlete	SP	FS	TFP	Rank
Josée Chouinard	10	11	16.0	9
Karen Preston	12	8	14.0	8

Pairs

Athletes	SP	FS	TFP	Rank
Sherry Ball; Kris Wirtz	11	12	17.5	12
Christine Hough; Doug Ladret	9	10	14.5	9
Isabelle Brasseur; Lloyd Eisler	3	3	4.5	3rd place, bronze medalist(s)

Ice Dancing

Athletes	CD1	CD2	OD	FD	TFP	Rank
Jacqueline Petr; Mark Janoschak	11	12	12	13	24.8	12

== Freestyle skiing ==
Men

Athlete	Event	Qualification			Final		
Athlete	Event	Time	Points	Rank	Time	Points	Rank
Christian Marcoux	Moguls	33.31	19.70	27	did not advance		
Lane Barrett	Moguls	33.97	21.13	22	did not advance		
John Smart	Moguls	32.37	23.48	6 Q	35.55	24.15	5
Jean-Luc Brassard	Moguls	35.17	23.93	3 Q	35.50	23.71	7

Women

Athlete	Event	Qualification			Final		
Athlete	Event	Time	Points	Rank	Time	Points	Rank
Anna Kindy	Moguls	46.95	14.75	18	did not advance		
LeeLee Morrison-Henry	Moguls	42.76	16.46	17	did not advance		
Bronwen Thomas	Moguls	44.84	16.73	16	did not advance		

== Ice hockey ==
=== Group B ===
Twelve participating teams were placed in two groups. After playing a round-robin, the top four teams in each group advanced to the Medal Round while the last two teams competed in the consolation round for the 9th to 12th places.

Team advanced to the Final Round
Team sent to compete in the Consolation round

Team	GP	W	L	T	GF	GA	DIF	PTS
Canada	5	4	1	0	28	9	19	8
Unified Team	5	4	1	0	32	10	22	8
Czechoslovakia	5	4	1	0	25	15	10	8
France	5	2	3	0	14	22	-8	4
Switzerland	5	1	4	0	13	25	-12	2
Norway	5	0	5	0	7	38	-31	0

France	2:3	Canada
Canada	6:1	Switzerland
Canada	10:0	Norway
Canada	5:1	Czechoslovakia
Unified Team	5:4	Canada

=== Final round ===
Quarter-finals

Canada	4:3	Germany

Semi-finals

Canada	4:2	Czechoslovakia

Final

Unified Team	3:1	Canada (silver)

=== Leading scorers ===
Rk	Team	GP	G	A	Pts
1st	Joe Juneau	8	6	9	15
4th	Eric Lindros	8	5	6	11

- Team Roster
- Sean Burke
- Trevor Kidd
- Sam St. Laurent
- Kevin Dahl
- Curt Giles
- Gord Hynes
- Brian Tutt
- Dave Hannan
- Dave Archibald
- Adrien Plavsic
- Eric Lindros
- Chris Lindberg
- Todd Brost
- Joé Juneau
- Randy Smith
- Jason Woolley
- Dan Ratushny
- Fabian Joseph
- Kent Manderville
- Brad Schlegel (c)
- Patrick Lebeau
- Wally Schreiber
- Dave Tippett
- Head coach: Dave King

== Luge ==
Men

Athlete	Run 1		Run 2		Run 3		Run 4		Total	
Athlete	Time	Rank	Time	Rank	Time	Rank	Time	Rank	Time	Rank
Christi-Adrian Sudu	46.669	24	46.576	23	47.328	25	47.225	24	3:07.798	24
Harington Telford	45.924	14	46.426	21	46.829	17	47.016	21	3:06.195	18

(Men's) Doubles

Athletes	Run 1		Run 2		Total	
Athletes	Time	Rank	Time	Rank	Time	Rank
Christi-Adrian Sudu; Dan Doll	47.178	16	46.923	10	1:34.101	13
Bob Gasper; André Benoit	46.873	11	47.229	15	1:34.102	14

Women

Athlete	Run 1		Run 2		Run 3		Run 4		Total	
Athlete	Time	Rank	Time	Rank	Time	Rank	Time	Rank	Time	Rank
Kathy Salmon	47.522	19	47.395	17	47.358	13	47.246	15	3:09.521	16

== Short track speed skating ==
Men

Athlete	Event	Round one		Quarter finals		Semi finals		Finals	
Athlete	Event	Time	Rank	Time	Rank	Time	Rank	Time	Final rank
Michel Daignault	1000 m	1:33.21	1 Q	1:33.66	2 Q	1:32.10	3 QB	1:37.10	8
Frédéric Blackburn	1000 m	1:38.67	1 Q	1:33.71	2 Q	1:32.23	2 QA	1:31.11	2nd place, silver medalist(s)
Mark Lackie	1000 m	1:39.19	1 Q	1:34.68	1 Q	1:32.30	2 QB	1:36.28	7
Mark Lackie; Frédéric Blackburn; Michel Daignault; Laurent Daignault; Sylvain Gagnon	5000 m relay			7:15.25	3 q	7:24.69	2 QA	7:14.06	2nd place, silver medalist(s)

Women

Athlete	Event	Round one		Quarter finals		Semi finals		Finals	
Athlete	Event	Time	Rank	Time	Rank	Time	Rank	Time	Final rank
Sylvie Daigle	500 m	48.50	3	did not advance					
Annie Perreault	500 m	48.41	2 Q	DSQ	–	did not advance			
Nathalie Lambert	500 m	48.41	2 Q	51.04	2 Q	1:01.90	3 QB	48.50	6
Angela Cutrone; Sylvie Daigle; Nathalie Lambert; Annie Perreault	3000 m relay					4:42.10	1 Q	4:36.62	1st place, gold medalist(s)

== Ski jumping ==
Athlete	Event	Jump 1		Jump 2		Total	
Athlete	Event	Distance	Points	Distance	Points	Points	Rank
Kirk Allen	Normal hill	74.0	79.4	76.0	82.6	162.0	55
Horst Bulau	Normal hill	80.5	91.3	78.5	90.1	181.4	42
Ron Richards	Normal hill	79.0	91.9	77.0	84.2	176.1	46
Kirk Allen	Large hill	88.0	56.7	79.0	37.1	93.8	53
Horst Bulau	Large hill	87.0	56.8	78.5	40.9	97.7	52
Ron Richards	Large hill	94.5	69.8	88.5	58.9	128.7	43

Men's team large hill

Athletes	Result	
Athletes	Points ^{1}	Rank
Ron Richards; Horst Bulau; Kirk Allen	341.0	14

^{1} Three (for most countries four) teams members performed two jumps each. The best three were counted.

== Speed skating ==
Men

Event	Athlete	Race	
Event	Athlete	Time	Rank
500 m	Sean Ireland	38.70	30
500 m	Kevin Scott	38.02	17
500 m	Guy Thibault	37.89	16
500 m	Robert Dubreuil	37.86	14
1000 m	Pat Kelly	1:36.62	45
1000 m	Sean Ireland	1:17.03	23
1000 m	Kevin Scott	1:16.47	16
1000 m	Guy Thibault	1:15.36	7
1500 m	Pat Kelly	DNF	–
1500 m	Kevin Scott	2:03.18	40
1500 m	Neal Marshall	2:01.62	36
1500 m	Guy Thibault	1:58.87	20
5000 m	Neal Marshall	7:27.64	26
10,000 m	Neal Marshall	15:07.03	26

Women

Event	Athlete	Race	
Event	Athlete	Time	Rank
500 m	Shelley Rhead-Skarvan	41.86	18
500 m	Catriona Le May Doan	41.59	14
500 m	Susan Auch	40.83	6
1000 m	Catriona Le May Doan	1:25.91	31
1000 m	Shelley Rhead-Skarvan	1:25.04	25
1000 m	Susan Auch	1:24.27	17
