= North Korea at the 1992 Winter Olympics =

- IOC code: PRK
- NOC: Olympic Committee of the Democratic People's Republic of Korea

in Albertville
- Competitors: 20 (9 men, 11 women) in 5 sports
- Medals Ranked 19th: Gold 0 Silver 0 Bronze 1 Total 1

Winter Olympics appearances (overview)
- 1964; 1968; 1972; 1976–1980; 1984; 1988; 1992; 1994; 1998; 2002; 2006; 2010; 2014; 2018; 2022–2026

Other related appearances
- Korea (2018)

North Korea was represented at the 1992 Winter Olympics in Albertville, France by the Olympic Committee of the Democratic People's Republic of Korea.

In total, 20 athletes including nine men and 11 women represented North Korea in five different sports including alpine skiing, cross-country skiing, figure skating, short track speed skating and speed skating.

North Korea won one medal at the games after Hwang Ok-sil won bronze in the short track speed skating women's 500 m.

== Competitors ==
In total, 20 athletes represented North Korea at the 1992 Winter Olympics in Albertville, France across five different sports.

Sport	Men	Women	Total
Alpine skiing	1	1	2
Cross-country skiing	2	2	4
Figure skating	3	3	6
Short track speed skating	1	2	3
Speed skating	2	3	5
Total	9	11	20

== Medalists ==
North Korea won one medal at the games after Hwang Ok-sil claimed bronze in the short track speed skating women's 500 m.

Medal	Name	Sport	Event	Date
Bronze	Hwang Ok-sil	Short track speed skating	Women's 500 m	20 February

== Alpine skiing ==
In total, two North Korean athletes participated in the alpine skiing events – Kim Chol-ryong in the men's giant slalom and Choi Mi-ok in the women's giant slalom and the women's slalom.

Men

Athlete	Event	Race 1	Race 2	Total	
Athlete	Event	Time	Time	Time	Rank
Kim Chol-ryong	Giant Slalom	1:23.24	1:22.02	2:45.26	67

Women

Athlete	Event	Race 1	Race 2	Total	
Athlete	Event	Time	Time	Time	Rank
Choi Mi-ok	Giant Slalom	DNF	–	DNF	–
Choi Mi-ok	Slalom	1:09.00	1:02.05	2:11.05	38

== Cross-country skiing ==
In total, four North Korean athletes participated in the cross-country skiing events – Son Chol-U and Chang Song-Rok in the men's 10 km classical, the men's 15 km freestyle pursuit and the men's 30 km classical, Li Gyong-Hui in the women's 5 km classical, the women's 10 km freestyle pursuit and the women's 15 km classical and Li Gyong-Ae in the women's 5 km classical.

Men

Event	Athlete	Race	
Event	Athlete	Time	Rank
10 km C	Son Chol-U	36:08.6	89
10 km C	Chang Song-Rok	34:34.9	78
15 km pursuit^{1} F	Chang Song-Rok	52:43.4	76
15 km pursuit^{1} F	Son Chol-U	52:35.5	73
30 km C	Son Chol-U	1'43:14.9	75
30 km C	Chang Song-Rok	1'42:23.4	72

^{1} Starting delay based on 10 km results.
C = Classical style, F = Freestyle

Women

Event	Athlete	Race	
Event	Athlete	Time	Rank
5 km C	Li Gyong-Ae	18:54.1	61
5 km C	Li Gyong-Hui	16:26.7	51
10 km pursuit^{2} F	Li Gyong-Hui	33:58.8	53
15 km C	Li Gyong-Hui	47:10.5	30

^{2} Starting delay based on 5 km results.
C = Classical style, F = Freestyle

== Figure skating ==
In total, six North Korean athletes participated in the figure events – Su-Min Li in the men's singles, Gyong-Ok Li in the women's singles, Ok Ran Ko and Gwang Ho Kim in the pairs and Gwang Ho Ryu and Un Sil Pak in the ice dance.

Men

Athlete	SP	FS	TFP	Rank
Su-Min Li	28	DNF	DNF	–

Women

Athlete	SP	FS	TFP	Rank
Gyong-Ok Li	27	DNF	DNF	–

Pairs

Athletes	SP	FS	TFP	Rank
Ok Ran Ko; Gwang Ho Kim	18	18	27.0	18

Ice Dancing

Athletes	CD1	CD2	OD	FD	TFP	Rank
Gwang Ho Ryu; Un Sil Pak	19	19	19	19	38.0	19

== Short track speed skating ==
In total, three North Korean athletes participated in the Short track speed skating events – Li Won-Ho, Hwang Ok-Sil and Kim Chun-Hwa.

Men

Athlete	Event	Round one		Quarter finals		Semi finals		Finals	
Athlete	Event	Time	Rank	Time	Rank	Time	Rank	Time	Final rank
Li Won-Ho	1000 m	DSQ	–	did not advance					

Women

Athlete	Event	Round one		Quarter finals		Semi finals		Finals	
Athlete	Event	Time	Rank	Time	Rank	Time	Rank	Time	Final rank
Hwang Ok-Sil	500 m	48.70	1 Q	47.95	2 Q	47.74	1 QA	47.23	3rd place, bronze medalist(s)
Kim Chun-Hwa	500 m	49.10	3	did not advance					

== Speed skating ==
In total, five North Korean athletes participated in the speed skating events – Choi In-Chol, Li Yong-Chol, Kim Chun-Wol, Chong Chang-Suk and Song Hwa-Son.

Men

Event	Athlete	Race	
Event	Athlete	Time	Rank
500 m	Choi In-Chol	39.59	35
500 m	Li Yong-Chol	38.38	24
1000 m	Li Yong-Chol	1:18.17	37
1000 m	Choi In-Chol	1:16.50	18
1500 m	Choi In-Chol	2:00.36	27

Women

Event	Athlete	Race	
Event	Athlete	Time	Rank
500 m	Kim Chun-Wol	42.47	28
500 m	Chong Chang-Suk	42.45	27
500 m	Song Hwa-Son	42.23	25
1000 m	Kim Chun-Wol	1:26.49	33
1000 m	Song Hwa-Son	1:25.80	30
1000 m	Chong Chang-Suk	1:25.10	26
1500 m	Song Hwa-Son	2:15.87	31
1500 m	Kim Chun-Wol	2:14.87	29
1500 m	Chong Chang-Suk	2:11.06	22
