= Figure skating at the 1992 Winter Olympics =

Figure skating at the XVI Olympic Winter Games
- Type: Olympic Games
- Venue: La halle de glace Olympique

Champions
- Men's singles: Viktor Petrenko (EUN)
- Ladies' singles: (United States) Kristi Yamaguchi
- Pairs: Natalia Mishkutenok / Artur Dmitriev (EUN)
- Ice dance: Marina Klimova / Sergei Ponomarenko (EUN)
- Previous: 1988 Winter Olympics
- Next: 1994 Winter Olympics

The figure skating events at the 1992 Winter Olympic Games were held at the Halle Olympique located next to the Théâtre des Cérémonies, two kilometers southwest of downtown Albertville.

At the 1992 Winter Olympics, the short program was called the original program. The 1992 Winter Olympics was also the first time that the men's and ladies' events did not include a compulsory figures competition.

== Medal table ==
| Rank | Nation | Gold | Silver | Bronze | Total |
|---|---|---|---|---|---|
| 1 | Unified Team | 3 | 1 | 1 | 5 |
| 2 | United States | 1 | 1 | 1 | 3 |
| 3 | France | 0 | 1 | 0 | 1 |
| 3 | Japan | 0 | 1 | 0 | 1 |
| 5 | Canada | 0 | 0 | 1 | 1 |
| 5 | Czechoslovakia | 0 | 0 | 1 | 1 |
| Totals (6 entries) | | 4 | 4 | 4 | 12 |

== Results ==
=== Men's singles ===
13, 15 February 1992

| Rank | Name | Nation | SP | FS | TFP |
|---|---|---|---|---|---|
| 1 | Viktor Petrenko | Unified Team | 1 | 1 | 1.5 |
| 2 | Paul Wylie | United States | 3 | 2 | 3.5 |
| 3 | Petr Barna | Czechoslovakia | 2 | 3 | 4.0 |
| 4 | Christopher Bowman | United States | 7 | 4 | 7.5 |
| 5 | Alexei Urmanov | Unified Team | 5 | 5 | 7.5 |
| 6 | Kurt Browning | Canada | 4 | 6 | 8.0 |
| 7 | Elvis Stojko | Canada | 6 | 7 | 10.0 |
| 8 | Viacheslav Zagorodniuk | Unified Team | 10 | 8 | 13.0 |
| 9 | Michael Slipchuk | Canada | 8 | 9 | 13.0 |
| 10 | Todd Eldredge | United States | 9 | 11 | 15.5 |
| 11 | Grzegorz Filipowski | Poland | 13 | 10 | 16.5 |
| 12 | Steven Cousins | Great Britain | 12 | 12 | 18.0 |
| 13 | Masakazu Kagiyama | Japan | 11 | 15 | 20.5 |
| 14 | Nicolas Pétorin | France | 14 | 14 | 21.0 |
| 15 | Éric Millot | France | 17 | 13 | 21.5 |
| 16 | Cameron Medhurst | Australia | 16 | 16 | 24.0 |
| 17 | David Liu | Chinese Taipei | 15 | 19 | 26.5 |
| 18 | Ralph Burghart | Austria | 20 | 18 | 28.0 |
| 19 | Oula Jääskeläinen | Finland | 23 | 17 | 28.5 |
| 20 | Konstantin Kostin | Latvia | 18 | 22 | 31.0 |
| 21 | Jung Sung-Il | South Korea | 21 | 21 | 31.5 |
| 22 | Henrik Walentin | Denmark | 24 | 20 | 32.0 |
| 23 | Mitsuhiro Murata | Japan | 22 | 23 | 34.0 |
| WD | Gilberto Viadana | Italy | 19 | | |
Free skate not reached
| 25 | Zhang Shubin | China | 25 | | |
| 26 | Luka Klasinc | Slovenia | 26 | | |
| 27 | Marius Negrea | Romania | 27 | | |
| 28 | Li Su-min | North Korea | 28 | | |
| 29 | Tomislav Čižmešija | Croatia | 29 | | |
| 30 | Riccardo Olavarrieta | Mexico | 30 | | |
| WD | Jan Erik Digernes | Norway | | | |

=== Women's singles ===
19, 21 February 1992

| Rank | Name | Nation | SP | FS | TFP |
|---|---|---|---|---|---|
| 1 | Kristi Yamaguchi | United States | 1 | 1 | 1.5 |
| 2 | Midori Ito | Japan | 4 | 2 | 4.0 |
| 3 | Nancy Kerrigan | United States | 2 | 3 | 4.0 |
| 4 | Tonya Harding | United States | 6 | 4 | 7.0 |
| 5 | Surya Bonaly | France | 3 | 6 | 7.5 |
| 6 | Chen Lu | China | 11 | 5 | 10.5 |
| 7 | Yuka Sato | Japan | 7 | 7 | 10.5 |
| 8 | Karen Preston | Canada | 12 | 8 | 14.0 |
| 9 | Josée Chouinard | Canada | 10 | 11 | 16.0 |
| 10 | Marina Kielmann | Germany | 15 | 9 | 16.5 |
| 11 | Lenka Kulovaná | Czechoslovakia | 9 | 12 | 16.5 |
| 12 | Laëtitia Hubert | France | 5 | 15 | 17.5 |
| 13 | Patricia Neske | Germany | 16 | 10 | 18.0 |
| 14 | Julia Vorobieva | Unified Team | 14 | 13 | 20.0 |
| 15 | Anisette Torp-Lind | Denmark | 8 | 16 | 20.0 |
| 16 | Tatiana Rachkova | Unified Team | 13 | 14 | 20.5 |
| 17 | Viktoria Dimitrova | Bulgaria | 18 | 17 | 26.0 |
| 18 | Joanne Conway | Great Britain | 17 | 18 | 26.5 |
| 19 | Zuzanna Szwed | Poland | 23 | 19 | 30.5 |
| 20 | Alma Lepina | Latvia | 22 | 20 | 31.5 |
| 21 | Olga Vassiljeva | Estonia | 21 | 21 | 31.5 |
| 22 | Suzanne Otterson | Great Britain | 20 | 22 | 32.0 |
| 23 | Krisztina Czakó | Hungary | 19 | 23 | 32.5 |
| WD | Hélène Persson | Sweden | 24 | | |
Free skate not reached
| 25 | Željka Čižmešija | Croatia | 25 | | |
| 26 | Mojca Kopač | Slovenia | 26 | | |
| 27 | Li Gyong-ok | North Korea | 27 | | |
| 28 | Lee Eun-hee | South Korea | 28 | | |
| 29 | Mayda Navarro | Mexico | 29 | | |

=== Pairs ===
9, 11 February 1992

| Rank | Name | Nation | SP | FS | TFP |
|---|---|---|---|---|---|
| 1 | Natalia Mishkutenok / Artur Dmitriev | Unified Team | 1 | 1 | 1.5 |
| 2 | Elena Bechke / Denis Petrov | Unified Team | 2 | 2 | 3.0 |
| 3 | Isabelle Brasseur / Lloyd Eisler | Canada | 3 | 3 | 4.5 |
| 4 | Radka Kovaříková / René Novotný | Czechoslovakia | 4 | 4 | 6.0 |
| 5 | Evgenia Shishkova / Vadim Naumov | Unified Team | 5 | 5 | 7.5 |
| 6 | Natasha Kuchiki / Todd Sand | United States | 6 | 6 | 9.0 |
| 7 | Peggy Schwarz / Alexander König | Germany | 8 | 7 | 11.0 |
| 8 | Mandy Wötzel / Axel Rauschenbach | Germany | 10 | 8 | 13.0 |
| 9 | Christine Hough / Doug Ladret | Canada | 9 | 10 | 14.5 |
| 10 | Calla Urbanski / Rocky Marval | United States | 7 | 11 | 14.5 |
| 11 | Jenni Meno / Scott Wendland | United States | 12 | 9 | 15.0 |
| 12 | Sherry Ball / Kris Wirtz | Canada | 11 | 12 | 17.5 |
| 13 | Danielle Carr / Stephen Carr | Australia | 13 | 13 | 19.5 |
| 14 | Rena Inoue / Tomoaki Koyama | Japan | 14 | 14 | 21.0 |
| 15 | Anna Tabacchi / Massimo Salvadè | Italy | 15 | 15 | 22.5 |
| 16 | Line Haddad / Sylvain Privé | France | 16 | 16 | 24.0 |
| 17 | Kathryn Pritchard / Jason Briggs | Great Britain | 17 | 17 | 25.5 |
| 18 | Ko Ok-ran / Kim Gwang-ho | North Korea | 18 | 18 | 27.0 |

=== Ice dance ===
14, 16, 17 February 1992

During a practice session on 10 February, Jacqueline Petr's right skate hit her left calf, requiring 22 stitches.

| Rank | Name | Nation | CD1 | CD2 | OD | FD | TFP |
|---|---|---|---|---|---|---|---|
| 1 | Marina Klimova / Sergei Ponomarenko | Unified Team | 1 | 1 | 1 | 1 | 2.0 |
| 2 | Isabelle Duchesnay / Paul Duchesnay | France | 3 | 3 | 2 | 2 | 4.4 |
| 3 | Maya Usova / Alexander Zhulin | Unified Team | 2 | 2 | 3 | 3 | 5.6 |
| 4 | Oksana Grishuk / Evgeni Platov | Unified Team | 4 | 4 | 4 | 4 | 8.0 |
| 5 | Stefania Calegari / Pasquale Camerlengo | Italy | 5 | 5 | 5 | 5 | 10.0 |
| 6 | Susanna Rahkamo / Petri Kokko | Finland | 7 | 7 | 6 | 6 | 12.4 |
| 7 | Klára Engi / Attila Tóth | Hungary | 6 | 6 | 7 | 7 | 13.6 |
| 8 | Dominique Yvon / Frédéric Palluel | France | 8 | 8 | 9 | 8 | 16.6 |
| 9 | Sophie Moniotte / Pascal Lavanchy | France | 9 | 9 | 8 | 9 | 17.4 |
| 10 | Kateřina Mrázová / Martin Šimeček | Czechoslovakia | 12 | 11 | 10 | 10 | 20.6 |
| 11 | April Sargent-Thomas / Russ Witherby | United States | 10 | 10 | 11 | 11 | 21.6 |
| 12 | Jacqueline Petr / Mark Janoschak | Canada | 11 | 12 | 12 | 13 | 24.8 |
| 13 | Anna Croci / Luca Mantovani | Italy | 13 | 13 | 13 | 12 | 25.0 |
| 14 | Regina Woodward / Csaba Szentpétery | Hungary | 15 | 15 | 15 | 14 | 29.0 |
| 15 | Rachel Mayer / Peter Breen | United States | 14 | 14 | 14 | 15 | 29.0 |
| 16 | Margarita Drobiazko / Povilas Vanagas | Lithuania | 17 | 17 | 17 | 16 | 33.0 |
| 17 | Melanie Bruce / Andrew Place | Great Britain | 16 | 16 | 16 | 17 | 33.0 |
| 18 | Han Bing / Yang Hui | China | 18 | 18 | 18 | 18 | 36.0 |
| 19 | Ryu Gwang-ho / Pak Un-sil | North Korea | 19 | 19 | 19 | 19 | 38.0 |
