= Mexico at the 1992 Winter Olympics =

- IOC code: MEX
- NOC: Mexican Olympic Committee
- Website: www.soycom.org (in Spanish)

in Albertville
- Competitors: 20 (16 men, 4 women) in 4 sports
- Flag bearer: Roberto Alvárez (cross-country skiing)
- Medals: Gold 0 Silver 0 Bronze 0 Total 0

Winter Olympics appearances (overview)
- 1928; 1932–1980; 1984; 1988; 1992; 1994; 1998; 2002; 2006; 2010; 2014; 2018; 2022; 2026

Mexico competed at the 1992 Winter Olympics in Albertville, France.

== Competitors ==
The following is the list of number of competitors in the Games.

Sport	Men	Women	Total
Alpine skiing	7	3	10
Bobsleigh	7	–	7
Cross-country skiing	1	0	1
Figure skating	1	1	2
Total	16	4	20

== Alpine skiing ==
Men

Athlete	Event	Race 1	Race 2	Total	
Athlete	Event	Time	Time	Time	Rank
Hubertus von Fürstenberg-von Hohenlohe	Downhill			2:02.98	38
Carlos Mier y Terán	Super-G			DNF	–
Eduardo Ampudia	Super-G			1:36.86	87
Íñigo Domenech	Super-G			1:35.29	85
Hubertus von Fürstenberg-von Hohenlohe	Super-G			1:24.79	70
Jorge Eduardo Ballesteros	Giant Slalom	DNF	–	DNF	–
German Sánchez Pardo	Giant Slalom	1:27.29	1:29.42	2:56.71	79
Eduardo Ampudia	Giant Slalom	1:23.07	1:24.53	2:47.60	72
Carlos Mier y Terán	Giant Slalom	1:22.24	1:22.49	2:44.73	65
German Sánchez Pardo	Slalom	DNF	–	DNF	–
Juan-Carlos Elizondo	Slalom	1:27.91	1:13.88	2:41.79	54
Carlos Mier y Terán	Slalom	1:04.50	DNF	DNF	–
Jorge Eduardo Ballesteros	Slalom	1:03.85	DNF	DNF	–

Men's combined

Athlete	Downhill	Slalom		Total	
Athlete	Time	Time 1	Time 2	Points	Rank
Hubertus von Fürstenberg-von Hohenlohe	1:55.95	1:03.45	1:03.68	259.10	36

Women

Athlete	Event	Race 1	Race 2	Total	
Athlete	Event	Time	Time	Time	Rank
Veronica Ampudia	Giant Slalom	1:38.05	1:37.20	3:15.25	44
Sammantha Teuscher	Giant Slalom	1:30.18	1:32.50	3:02.68	41
Chus Cortina	Giant Slalom	1:23.68	1:23.36	2:47.04	36
Veronica Ampudia	Slalom	1:16.45	1:08.40	2:24.85	42
Sammantha Teuscher	Slalom	1:11.04	1:03.83	2:14.87	40
Chus Cortina	Slalom	1:08.52	58.61	2:07.13	36

== Bobsleigh ==
Sled	Athletes	Event	Run 1		Run 2		Run 3		Run 4		Total	
Sled	Athletes	Event	Time	Rank	Time	Rank	Time	Rank	Time	Rank	Time	Rank
MEX-1	Roberto Tamés; Miquel Elizondo	Two-man	1:03.46	42	1:03.88	42	1:03.42	38	1:03.46	39	4:14.22	41
MEX-2	Jorge Tamés; Carlos Casar	Two-man	1:03.42	41	1:03.77	41	1:03.66	40	1:03.78	42	4:14.63	42

Sled	Athletes	Event	Run 1		Run 2		Run 3		Run 4		Total	
Sled	Athletes	Event	Time	Rank	Time	Rank	Time	Rank	Time	Rank	Time	Rank
MEX-1	Luis Adrián Tamés; Ricardo Rodríguez; Francisco Negrete; Carlos Casar	Four-man	1:00.97	30	1:01.36	30	1:01.30	28	1:01.51	28	4:05.14	28

== Cross-country skiing ==
Men

Event	Athlete	Race	
Event	Athlete	Time	Rank
10 km C	Roberto Alvárez	40:28.5	105
15 km pursuit^{1} F	Roberto Alvárez	1'07:38.2	94
30 km C	Roberto Alvárez	2'01:28.1	81
50 km F	Roberto Alvárez	3'09:04.7	67

^{1} Starting delay based on 10 km results.
C = Classical style, F = Freestyle

== Figure skating ==
Men

Athlete	SP	FS	TFP	Rank
Ricardo Olavarrieta	30	Did not advance		30

Women

Athlete	SP	FS	TFP	Rank
Mayda Navarro	29	Did not advance		29
