= Valerie Scott =

Valerie Scott may refer to:

- Valerie Scott (tennis) (1918–2001), British tennis player
- Valerie Scott (alpine skier) (born 1967), British skier
- Valerie Scott (born 1958), Canadian sex worker and applicant in Canada (Attorney General) v. Bedford
- Valerie Scott, a fictional character in Land of the Giants
