= George Farrell =

George Farrell may refer to:

- George Farrell (bobsleigh) (born 1964), British bobsledder
- George Farrell (politician) (1895–1966), member of the Queensland Legislative Assembly
