= Paul Field (bobsledder) =

English bobsledder (born 1967)

Paul Field (born 24 June 1967) is an English bobsledder who competed in the 1992 and 1994 Winter Olympics. In 1992, he came seventh in the Men's Four along with teammates Mark Tout, George Farrell and Lenox Paul. In 1994, he came joint tenth. He is also well known as the 1994 UK Gladiators men's champion, as well as the runner-up in the first International Gladiators competition behind America's Wesley Two Scoops Berry, albeit in controversial circumstances following a severe albeit unintentional tackle by American gladiator Hawk, during the Powerball event in the Grand Final. Because of his successful achievements and all-round good sportsmanship, he is still highly regarded amongst fans of the series, and is known as one of the greatest contenders in the history of Gladiators as a global franchise, especially during its mid 1990s heyday.

Paul Field grew up in Hemel Hempstead where he competed for Dacorum Athletics Club. In the 1980s, he was the third ranked British decathlete behind Daley Thompson.
