= Mark Janoschak =

Canadian ice dancer

Personal information
- Born: December 2, 1968 (age 57) Bramalea, Chinguacousy Township, Ontario

Figure skating career
- Country: Canada
- Skating club: Upper Canada-NY SC; Chinguacousy SC

Mark Janoschak (born December 2, 1968, in Bramalea, a community in Chinguacousy Township) is a Canadian ice dancer. With partner Jacqueline Petr, he is the 1992 Canadian national champion. They represented Canada at the 1992 Winter Olympics, where they placed 12th.

== Career ==
A few months after he and Jacqueline Petr teamed up, they placed 7th at the 1987 World Junior Championships.

Two years later, Petr and Janoschak placed 6th at the Canadian Championships. The following year, they won the bronze medal. In 1991, they won the silver medal and qualified for the 1991 World Championships, where they placed 10th.

In 1992, Petr and Janoschak won their national title and were selected for the 1992 Winter Olympics. During a practice session on February 10, Petr's right skate hit her left calf, requiring 22 stitches. They finished 12th at the Olympics. At the 1992 World Championships, they placed 12th.

Petr and Janoschak retired from competitive skating and skated professionally in shows. Janoschak also skated competitively with Sandra Ross under the direction of Roy Bradshaw.

== Results ==
(with Jacqueline Petr)

International
Event	86–87	87–88	88–89	89–90	90–91	91–92	92–93
Winter Olympics						12th	
World Championships					10th	12th	
Skate America						5th	
Skate Canada				3rd	1st		
Internat. de Paris					4th		
Internat. St. Gervais			1st				
Nations Cup							5th
Nebelhorn Trophy			3rd				
Prize of Moscow News			6th				
International: Junior
World Junior Champ.	7th						
National
Canadian Champ.	2nd J	1st J	6th	3rd	2nd	1st	3rd
J = Junior level
