= Jacqueline Petr =

Canadian retired ice dancer

Personal information
- Full name: Jacqueline Petr
- Born: October 9, 1970 (age 55) Winnipeg, Manitoba, Canada

Figure skating career
- Country: Canada
- Skating club: Century Figure Skating Club; Winnipeg WC

Jacqueline Petr (born October 9, 1970 in Winnipeg, Manitoba) is a Canadian retired ice dancer. With partner Mark Janoschak, she is the 1992 Canadian national champion. They represented Canada at the 1992 Winter Olympics, where they placed 12th.

== Career ==
A few months after she and Mark Janoschak teamed up, they placed 7th at the 1987 World Junior Championships.

Two years later, Petr and Janoschak placed 6th at the Canadian Championships. The following year, they won the bronze medal. In 1991, they won the silver medal and qualified for the 1991 World Championships, where they placed 10th.

In 1992, Petr and Janoschak won their national title and were selected for the 1992 Winter Olympics. During a practice session on February 10, Petr's right skate hit her left calf, requiring 22 stitches. They finished 12th at the Olympics. At the 1992 World Championships, they placed 12th.

Petr and Janoschak retired from competitive skating and skated professionally in shows.

She later coached and was married to Joseph Mero until an affair with a student led to her being banned by the USFSA.

== Results ==
(with Mark Janoschak)

International
Event	86–87	87–88	88–89	89–90	90–91	91–92	92–93
Winter Olympics						12th	
World Championships					10th	12th	
Skate America						5th	
Skate Canada				3rd	1st		
Internat. de Paris					4th	5th	
Internat. St. Gervais			1st				
Nations Cup							5th
Nebelhorn Trophy			3rd				
Prize of Moscow News			6th				
International: Junior
World Junior Champ.	7th						
National
Canadian Champ.	2nd J	1st J	6th	3rd	2nd	1st	3rd
J = Junior level
