= Jim Curran (skier) =

American cross-country skier (born 1958)

Personal information
- Born: August 16, 1958 (age 67) Stamford, Vermont, United States

Sport
- Sport: Cross-country skiing

Jim Curran (born August 16, 1958) is an American cross-country skier. He competed in the men's 50 kilometre freestyle event at the 1992 Winter Olympics.
