= Merete Fjeldavlie =

Norwegian alpine skier (born 1968)

Merete Fjeldavlie (born 13 August 1968) is a retired Norwegian alpine skier.

She was born in Oslo, but grew up in Rjukan and represented the sports club Rjukan IF.

Fjeldavlie made her debut in the FIS Alpine Ski World Cup in January 1990 in Santa Caterina, where she finished as high as 10th in the giant slalom. She followed up with an 11th place in Meribel in January 1991. In the 1991–92 FIS Alpine Ski World Cup, she started with 9th, 11th and 16th places in three races in Santa Caterina, followed by her first podium, a 3rd place in Morzine in January 1992. She then won her first World Cup race in March 1992 in Vail, and also finished second in her last race of the season in Crans Montana. In total, she finished second in the 1992 Alpine Skiing World Cup super-G category.

The 1992–93 FIS Alpine Ski World Cup started with a 6th place in Park City and 11th in Steamboat Springs, and she also managed a 6th place in Haus im Ennstal, but the season also contained several sub-30th place results.

Fjeldavlie competed in three Alpine World Ski Championships, finishing 14th in the super-G in 1991, 27th in the super-G in 1996, and 21st in the super-G as well as 9th in the downhill in 2001. She finished 15th in the giant slalom and 22nd in the slalom at the 1992 Winter Olympics.

Her best World Cup outing in the years after 1992 was a 12th place in the February 1996 Val d'Isere super-G. In December 1999 Fjeldavlie returned to form, recording a 6th place in the downhill and 4th in the super-G, both in St. Moritz. In 2001 she managed a 7th place in the Garmisch-Partenkirchen super-G, but had her last race on 22 December.
