= Reece Bell =

British-American alpine skier

Personal information
- Born: 27 August 2001 (age 25)

Skiing career
- Country: United Kingdom
- Sport: Alpine skiing
- Disciplines: Slalom
- World Cup debut: 29 December 2021 (age 20)

World Championships
- Teams: 2 – (2023, 2025)

World Cup
- Seasons: 3 – (2022, 2023, 2025)

Reece Bell (born 27 August 2001) is an alpine ski racer who competes in the slalom. She finished inside the Top 20 at the 2025 World Championships. Raised in the United States, she competes for Great Britain.

== Early life ==
Bell is the daughter of ski racer Martin Bell. She grew up in Vail, Colorado, where she began skiing at the age of three. She began competing at the age of seven after her family had moved to Big Sky, Montana. She won the British under-12 championships in 2013 and the British under-16 championships in 2017.

Bell studied at the University of Denver, graduating with a degree in ecology.

== Career ==
In her early career, Bell podiumed in National Junior Race and North American-level events, as well as at the National Championships. However she also suffered two ACL injuries. She competed at the 2023 Alpine Ski World Championships.

In 2025, Bell competed in the slalom at the World Championships. Prior to this she had been competing at the Europa Cup and was being mentored by Dave Ryding. She finished the first run in 27th after being the fortieth rider to attempt the course, and climbed again on the second run to finish in 20th position.
