= Dany Bouchard =

Canadian cross-country skier

Dany Bouchard (born 19 September 1967) is a Canadian former cross-country skier who competed in the 1992 Winter Olympics and in the 1994 Winter Olympics.
