= Noureddine Bouchaal =

Moroccan alpine skier (born 1970)

Personal information
- Nationality: Moroccan
- Born: 24 October 1970 (age 54)

Sport
- Sport: Alpine skiing

Nourddine Bouchaal (born 24 October1970) is a Moroccan alpine skier. He competed in the men's giant slalom at the 1992 Winter Olympics.
