= Dennis Marineau =

Canadian bobsledder

Personal information
- Born: 19 December 1962 (age 62); Calgary, Alberta, Canada

Sport
- Sport: Bobsleigh

Dennis Marineau (born 19 December 1962) is a Canadian bobsledder. He competed in the two man and the four man events at the 1992 Winter Olympics.
