= Mark Lackie =

Short track speed skater

Medal record

Men's short track speed skating

Representing Canada

Olympic Games
Silver medal – second place	1992 Albertville	5000 m relay

World Championships
Gold medal – first place	1989 Solihull	500m
Silver medal – second place	1989 Solihull	5000m Relay
Silver medal – second place	1990 Amsterdam	5000m Relay
Bronze medal – third place	1989 Solihull	Overall
Bronze medal – third place	1989 Solihull	1500 m
Bronze medal – third place	1989 Solihull	1000 m
Bronze medal – third place	1991 Sydney	500 m

World Team Championships
Bronze medal – third place	1991 Seoul	Team

Mark Andrew Lackie (born March 23, 1967, in Saint John, New Brunswick) is a Canadian short track speed skater who competed in the 1992 Winter Olympics.

In 1992 he was a member of the Canadian relay team which won the silver medal in the 5000 metre relay competition. In the 1000 m event he finished seventh.
