= Miro Pandurević =

Yugoslav bobsledder

Personal information
- Nationality: Yugoslav
- Born: 26 June 1964 (age 60)

Sport
- Sport: Bobsleigh

Miro Pandurević (born 26 June 1964) is a Yugoslav bobsledder. He competedat the 1988 Winter Olympics and the 1992 Winter Olympics.
