= Slađan Ilić =

Yugoslav alpine skier (born 1969)

Personal information
- Nationality: Yugoslav
- Born: 4 January 1969 (age 56)

Sport
- Sport: Alpine skiing

Slađan Ilić (born 4 January 1969) is a Yugoslav alpine skier. He competed in the men's slalom at the 1992 Winter Olympics.
