= Ognjen Sokolović =

Bosnian bobsledder

Personal information
- Nationality: Bosnian
- Born: 12 June 1963 (age 61); Sarajevo, Yugoslavia

Sport
- Sport: Bobsleigh

Ognjen Sokolović (born 12 June 1963) is a Bosnian bobsledder. He competed at the 1984 Winter Olympics and the 1992 Winter Olympics, representing Yugoslavia, and at the 1998 Winter Olympics, representing Bosnia and Herzegovina.
