= Hicham Diddou =

Moroccan alpine skier (born 1974)

Personal information
- Nationality: Moroccan
- Born: 3 March 1974 (age 51)

Sport
- Sport: Alpine skiing

Hicham Diddou (born 3 March 1974) is a Moroccan alpine skier. He competed in the men's slalom at the 1992 Winter Olympics.
