= Mustapha Naitlhou =

Moroccan alpine skier (born 1968)

Personal information
- Nationality: Moroccan
- Born: 19 August 1968 (age 56)

Sport
- Sport: Alpine skiing

Mustapha Naitlhou (born 19 August 1968) is a Moroccan alpine skier. He competed in the men's giant slalom at the 1992 Winter Olympics.
