= Choi In-chol =

North Korean speed skater (born 1974)

Personal information
- Nationality: North Korean
- Born: 19 January 1974 (age 51)

Sport
- Sport: Speed skating

Choi In-chol (born 19 January 1974) is a North Korean speed skater. He competed in three events at the 1992 Winter Olympics.
