= Kim Chol-ryong =

North Korean alpine skier (born 1972)

Personal information
- Nationality: North Korean
- Born: 18 August 1972 (age 52)

Sport
- Sport: Alpine skiing

Kim Chol-ryong (born 18 August 1972) is a North Korean alpine skier. He competed in the men's giant slalom at the 1992 Winter Olympics.
