= Íñigo Domenech =

Mexican alpine skier (born 1973)

Personal information
- Nationality: Mexican
- Born: 14 February 1973 (age 52)

Sport
- Sport: Alpine skiing

Íñigo Domenech (born 14 February 1973) is a Mexican alpine skier. He competed in the men's super-G at the 1992 Winter Olympics.
