= Glenn Scott (skier) =

British cross-country skier (born 1966)

Personal information
- Nationality: British
- Born: 29 October 1966 (age 58); Luton, England

Sport
- Sport: Cross-country skiing

Glenn Scott (born 29 October 1966) is a British cross-country skier. He competed in the men's 10 kilometre classical event at the 1992 Winter Olympics.
