= Jorge Eduardo Ballesteros =

Mexican alpine skier (born 1976)

Personal information
- Born: 10 March 1976 (age 49); Mexico City, Mexico

Sport
- Sport: Alpine skiing

Jorge Eduardo Ballesteros (born 10 March 1976) is a Mexican alpine skier. He competed in two events at the 1992 Winter Olympics.
