= Borislav Vujadinović =

Bosnian bobsledder

Personal information
- Nationality: Bosnian
- Born: 9 September 1959 (age 65); Nevesinje, Yugoslavia

Sport
- Sport: Bobsleigh

Borislav Vujadinović (born 9 September 1959) is a Bosnian bobsledder. He competed at the 1984, 1988 and the 1992 Winter Olympics, representing Yugoslavia.

== Career results ==
=== Olympic Games ===
Event	Two-man	Four-man
Representing Yugoslavia
(Socialist Federal Republic of Yugoslavia) 1984 Sarajevo	-	23rd
(Canada) 1988 Calgary	28th	-
(France) 1992 Albertville	29th	-
