= Christi-Adrian Sudu =

Canadian luger (born 1968)

Personal information
- Nationality: Canadian
- Born: 29 May 1968 (age 56); Fălticeni, Romania

Sport
- Sport: Luge

Christi-Adrian Sudu (born 29 May 1968) is a Canadian luger. He competed in the men's singles and doubles events at the 1992 Winter Olympics.
