= Brahim Id Abdellah =

Moroccan alpine skier (born 1967)

Personal information
- Nationality: Moroccan
- Born: 11 March 1967 (age 58)

Sport
- Sport: Alpine skiing

Brahim Id Abdellah (born 11 March 1967) is a Moroccan alpine skier. He competed in the men's super-G at the 1992 Winter Olympics.
