= Bajro Čenanović =

Bosnia and Herzegovina speed skater

Bajro Ćenanović
Personal information
- Nationality: Bosnia and Herzegovina
- Born: 2 September 1968 (age 56); Sarajevo, Yugoslavia

Sport
- Sport: Speed skating

Bajro Ćenanović (born 2 September 1968) was a Bosnian speed skater. He competed for Yugoslavia in three events at the 1992 Winter Olympics.
