= Yvonne Visser =

Canadian biathlete (born 1965)

Yvonne Visser (born 9 July 1965) is a Canadian former biathlete who competed in the 1992 Winter Olympics. Visser came from Millarville, Alberta, and was sponsored by Calgary merchants.

At the Winter Olympics in 1992, Visser finished 59th in a field of 69 on the Les Saisies biathlon course for the 7.5 kilometre sprint. In the World Cup Biathlon in March 1993 in Lillehammer, Norway, Visser came in 64th in a field of 69.
