= Guy Thibault (speed skater) =

Canadian speed skater

Personal information
- Born: 30 June 1964 (age 62) Quebec City, Quebec, Canada

Sport
- Sport: Speed skating

Guy Thibault (born 30 June 1964) is a Canadian speed skater. He competed at the 1988 Winter Olympics and the 1992 Winter Olympics.
