= Rejmon Horo =

Yugoslav alpine skier (born 1970)

Personal information
- Nationality: Yugoslav
- Born: 19 July 1970 (age 54)

Sport
- Sport: Alpine skiing

Rejmon Horo (born 19 July 1970) is a Yugoslav alpine skier. He competed in two events at the 1992 Winter Olympics.
