= Igor Špirić =

Bosnian luger (born 1971)

Personal information
- Nationality: Bosnian
- Born: 22 June 1971 (age 53); Sarajevo

Sport
- Country: Yugoslavia
- Sport: Luge

Igor Špirić (born 22 June 1971) is a Bosnian luger. He competed for Yugoslavia in the men's singles event at the 1992 Winter Olympics.
