= Dragiša Jovanović =

Yugoslav bobsledder

Personal information
- Nationality: Yugoslav
- Born: 23 October 1965 (age 59)

Sport
- Sport: Bobsleigh

Dragiša Jovanović (born 23 October 1965) is a Yugoslav bobsledder. He competed in the two man and the four man events at the 1992 Winter Olympics.
