= Sean Langmuir =

British alpine skier (born 1967)

Sean Langmuir (born 9 November 1967 in Grantown-on-Spey) is a British former alpine skier who competed in the 1992 Winter Olympics.
