= Ronald Duncan (alpine skier) =

British alpine skier (born 1962)

Ronald 'Boris' Duncan CPhys (born 4 September 1962) is a former British alpine skier who competed on the annual FIS Alpine Ski World Cup circuit from 1981-1993, at four FIS Alpine World Ski Championships and at the 1988 Winter Olympics in Calgary and the 1992 Winter Olympics in Albertville. He set up @UK PLC in 1999.

== Early life and education ==
Ronald Duncan was born in Broughty Ferry, Dundee, Scotland. He was educated at Strathallan School in Perthshire and Magdalene College, Cambridge, where he studied physics and graduated with a degree in natural sciences in 1985. Duncan attended Magdalene College at the same time as the Scottish international rugby players Gavin Hastings and Rob Wainwright.

== Sporting career ==
In 1980 and 1983, Duncan was the British men's downhill champion. He was also the men's super-G champion in 1991 and men's combined champion in 1983 and 1991. Duncan's best finish on the world cup circuit was in the downhill on 15 March 1990, when he finished in 13th place at Åre in Sweden.

At the 1988 Winter Olympics, Duncan finished 37th in the men's downhill and 'did not finish' the men's combined. In the 1992 Winter Olympics he finished 31st in the men's downhill, 40th in the men's super-G and 'did not finish' the men's combined.

From 2002 to 2004 Duncan was the chairman of the British Ski and Snowboard Federation, trading as Snowsport GB, the governing body for skiing and snowboarding in Great Britain.

== Business career ==
Duncan is the co-founder and chairman of @UK PLC. Previously, he ran a computer software consultancy. In 2014 and 2015 he was shortlisted for Entrepreneur of the Year, at the Grant Thornton Quoted Company Awards.

== See also ==
- 1992 Alpine Skiing World Cup – Men's downhill
