= Jane Isakson =

Canadian biathlete (born 1965)

Jane Isakson (born 15 October 1965) is a Canadian former biathlete who competed in the 1992 Winter Olympics and in the 1994 Winter Olympics.
