= Ewa Zagata =

Polish alpine skier (born 1970)

Personal information
- Nationality: Polish
- Born: 17 May 1970 (age 54); Zakopane, Poland

Sport
- Sport: Alpine skiing

Ewa Zagata (born 17 May 1970) is a Polish alpine skier. She competed in two events at the 1992 Winter Olympics.
