= Rob Crossan =

Canadian alpine skier (born 1968)

Rob Crossan (born 13 March 1968 in Barrie, Ontario) is a Canadian former alpine skier who competed in the 1992 Winter Olympics and 1994 Winter Olympics.
