= Brahim Izdag =

Moroccan alpine skier (born 1966)

Personal information
- Nationality: Moroccan
- Born: 2 May 1966 (age 60)

Sport
- Sport: Alpine skiing

Brahim Izdag (born 2 May 1966) is a Moroccan alpine skier. He competed in two events at the 1992 Winter Olympics.
