= Igor Latinović =

Yugoslav alpine skier (born 1971)

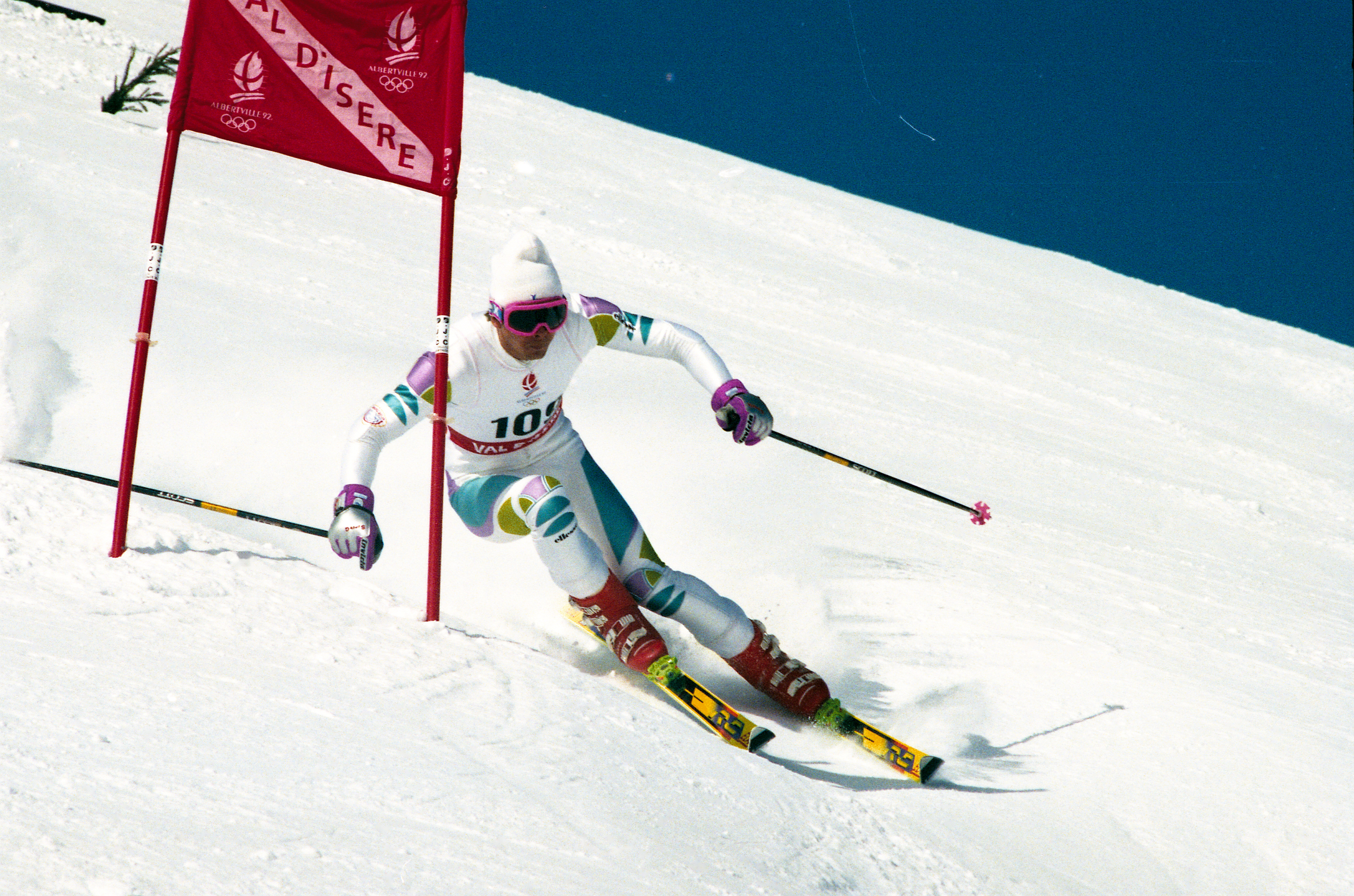

Personal information
- Nationality: Yugoslav
- Born: 6 August 1971 (age 53)

Sport
- Sport: Alpine skiing

Igor Latinović (born 6 August 1971) is a Yugoslav alpine skier. He competed in three events at the 1992 Winter Olympics.
