= Debbie Pratt =

British alpine skier (born 1969)

Debbie Pratt (born 18 February 1969) is a British former alpine skier who competed in the 1992 Winter Olympics.
