= Carlos Mier y Terán =

Mexican alpine skier (born 1973)

Personal information
- Nationality: Mexican
- Born: 31 October 1973 (age 51); London, England

Sport
- Sport: Alpine skiing

Carlos Mier y Terán (born 31 October 1973) is a Mexican alpine skier. He competed in three events at the 1992 Winter Olympics.
