= Pak Un-sil =

North Korean ice dancer

Personal information
- Nationality: North Korean
- Born: 21 July 1972 (age 52)

Sport
- Sport: Figure skating

Pak Un-sil (born 21 July 1972) is a North Korean ice dancer. He competed in the ice dance event at the 1992 Winter Olympics.
