= Mladen Grujić (biathlete) =

Yugoslav biathlete (born 1969)

Personal information
- Nationality: Yugoslav
- Born: 21 March 1969 (age 56)

Sport
- Sport: Biathlon

Mladen Grujić (born 21 March 1969) is a Yugoslav biathlete. He competed in the men's 20 km individual event at the 1992 Winter Olympics.
