= Tony Fiala =

Canadian biathlete

Tony Fiala (born 2 February 1966) is a Canadian former biathlete who competed in the 1992 Winter Olympics held in Albertville.
