= Debbie Palmer (speed skater) =

British speed skater

Personal information
- Full name: Deborah Samantha Palmer
- Nationality: British
- Born: 17 November 1975 (age 50) Swindon, England

Sport
- Sport: Short track speed skating

Deborah Samantha "Debbie" Palmer (born 17 November 1975) is a British former short track speed skater, who is now a lecturer and researcher. She competed at the 1992 Winter Olympics and the 1994 Winter Olympics. Palmer was ten times British Champion (1991 to 2000), and twelve times European Championship medalist including 1995 European champion (3000m). She was a World Cup 1500m silver medalist and finished 4th in the 1500m, and ranked 5th overall, at the 1996 World Championships in The Hague, Netherlands.

== Biography ==
Palmer competed in short track speed skating from 1990 to 2002. She took part at the 1992 Winter Olympics and the 1994 Winter Olympics, and was named as a reserve for the 1998 Winter Olympics in Nagano. Palmer retired from speed skating in 2002.

In 2006, Palmer returned to ice hockey, after retiring from the sport six years earlier. Palmer had previously played for the Swindon Top Cats, and returned to Great Britain's national ice hockey team. She previously was forced to retire from ice hockey after suffering a prolapsed disc in her back.

In 2009, she gained a PhD in injury epidemiology, working in the field of sports injuries and epidemiology for more than twelve years. Palmer travelled to the 2016 Summer Olympics in Brazil, working with the International Olympic Committee (IOC) to look after the wellbeing of athletes. In 2021, Palmer also worked with the Enduro World Series to look at injuries sustained by mountain bikers.
