= Silvia del Rincón =

Spanish alpine skier (born 1971)

Silvia del Rincon (born 3 April 1971) is a Spanish former alpine skier who competed in the 1992 Winter Olympics.
