= Gavin Forsyth =

British alpine skier (born 1969)

Gavin Forsyth (born 4 July 1969 in Manchester) is a British former alpine skier who competed in the 1992 Winter Olympics. He is the owner/operator of Clear Dental in British Columbia, Canada.
