= Zoran Ćosić =

Bosnian biathlete (born 1963)

Personal information
- Nationality: Bosnian
- Born: 3 December 1963 (age 61); Pale, SFR Yugoslavia

Sport
- Sport: Biathlon

Zoran Ćosić (born 3 December 1963) is a Bosnian biathlete. He competed at the 1984 Winter Olympics and the 1992 Winter Olympics.
