= Steve Cyr =

Canadian biathlete

Steve Cyr (born 20 May 1967) is a Canadian former biathlete who competed in the 1992 Winter Olympics, in the 1994 Winter Olympics, and in the 1998 Winter Olympics.
