= El-Hassan Mahta =

Moroccan alpine skier (born 1965)

Personal information
- Nationality: Moroccan
- Born: 2 October 1965 (age 59)

Sport
- Sport: Alpine skiing

El-Hassan Mahta (born 2 October 1965) is a Moroccan alpine skier. He competed in three events at the 1992 Winter Olympics.
