= Kim Gwang-ho =

North Korean figure skater (born 1973)

Personal information
- Nationality: North Korean
- Born: 7 August 1973 (age 52)

Sport
- Sport: Figure skating

Kim Gwang-ho (born 7 August 1973) is a North Korean figure skater. He competed in the pairs event at the 1992 Winter Olympics.
