= Brahim Ait Sibrahim =

Moroccan alpine skier (born 1967)

Personal information
- Nationality: Moroccan
- Born: 1 January 1967 (age 58)

Sport
- Sport: Alpine skiing

Brahim Ait Sibrahim (born 1 January 1967) is a Moroccan alpine skier. He competed at the 1984 Winter Olympics and the 1992 Winter Olympics.
