= Eduardo Ampudia =

Mexican alpine skier (born 1971)

Personal information
- Nationality: Mexican
- Born: 8 September 1971 (age 53)

Sport
- Sport: Alpine skiing

Eduardo Ampudia (born 8 September 1971) is a Mexican alpine skier. He competed in two events at the 1992 Winter Olympics.
