= Jean Paquet =

Canadian biathlete (born 1964)

Jean Paquet (born 12 October 1964) is a Canadian former biathlete who competed in the 1992 Winter Olympics.
