= Tine Kongsholm =

Danish alpine skier (born 1969)

Personal information
- Nationality: Danish
- Born: 9 December 1969 (age 56) Roskilde, Denmark

Sport
- Sport: Alpine skiing

Tine Kongsholm (born 9 December 1969) is a Danish alpine skier. She competed in two events at the 1992 Winter Olympics.
