= Li Su-min =

North Korean figure skater

Personal information
- Nationality: North Korean
- Born: 1 August 1974 (age 50)

Sport
- Sport: Figure skating

Li Su-min (born 1 August 1974) is a North Korean figure skater. He competed in the men's singles event at the 1992 Winter Olympics.
