= Tomislav Lopatić =

Bosnia and Herzegovina biathlete (born 1963)

Personal information
- Nationality: Bosnia and Herzegovina
- Born: 6 March 1963 (age 62); Jelovci, Yugoslavia

Sport
- Sport: Biathlon

Tomislav Lopatić (born 6 March 1963) is a Bosnia and Herzegovina biathlete. He competed at the 1984 Winter Olympics and the 1992 Winter Olympics. Together with biathletes Marjan Vidmar, Jure Velepec, Zoran Ćosić, Andrej Lanišek and Franjo Jakovec, he represented Yugoslavia at the 1984 Winter Olympic Games in Sarajevo. He competed in the sprint discipline, where he took 57th place.

At his second appearance at the 1992 Winter Olympics in Albertville, he competed in all three events: the 20 km individual race, the 10 km sprint race, and the relay race. After his active career, he became the trainer of the biathlon national team of Bosnia and Herzegovina. Although unprofessionally trained and with the lack of professional development necessary for the top results of his student Aleksandra Vasiljević, as well as the former Vedrana Vučićević, they achieve extraordinary results with their personal talent and amateur efforts. Aleksandra VasiljevićVedrana Vučićević.
