= Paul Ryan (biathlete) =

British biathlete (born 1970)

Personal information
- Nationality: British
- Born: 17 February 1970 (age 55); Netheravon, England

Sport
- Sport: Biathlon

Paul Ryan (born 17 February 1970) is a British biathlete. He competed in the men's 20 km individual event at the 1992 Winter Olympics.
