= Ko Ok-ran =

North Korean figure skater (born 1975)

Personal information
- Nationality: North Korean
- Born: 8 April 1975 (age 50)

Sport
- Sport: Figure skating

Ko Ok-ran (Korean: 고옥란, born 8 April 1975) is a North Korean figure skater. She competed in the pairs event at the 1992 Winter Olympics.
