= David Belam =

British cross-country skier (1968–2021)

Personal information
- Nationality: British
- Born: 7 January 1968 Hanover, Germany
- Died: 20 November 2021 (aged 53)

Sport
- Sport: Cross-country skiing

David Belam (7 January 1968 – 20 November 2021) was a British cross-country skier. He competed at the 1992 Winter Olympics and the 1994 Winter Olympics.
