= Wilf O'Reilly =

British speed skater

Wilf O'Reilly MBE
Personal information
- Full name: Wilfred John O'Reilly
- Born: 22 August 1964 (age 62) Birmingham, Warwickshire, England
Medal record
Men's short-track speed skating
Representing Great Britain
Olympic Games (Demonstration)
| Gold medal – first place | 1988 Calgary | 500 m |
| Gold medal – first place | 1988 Calgary | 1000 m |
World Championships
| Gold medal – first place | 1991 Sydney | Overall |
| Gold medal – first place | 1991 Sydney | 500 m |
| Gold medal – first place | 1991 Sydney | 1000 m |
| Silver medal – second place | 1989 Solihull | 1000m |
| Silver medal – second place | 1990 Amsterdam | Overall |
| Silver medal – second place | 1991 Sydney | 500m |
| Silver medal – second place | 1992 Denver | 500m |
| Bronze medal – third place | 1991 Sydney | 3000 m |
| Bronze medal – third place | 1991 Sydney | 5000 m relay |

Wilfred John O'Reilly MBE (born 22 August 1964 in Birmingham, Warwickshire - now West Midlands, England) is a British former short track speed skater. He won two gold medals at the 1988 Winter Olympics when short track speed skating was held as a demonstration sport. He was also the 1991 Overall World Champion. He is now coach of the Netherlands short track team.

== Speed skating career ==
O'Reilly won two gold medals in the 500 metres and 1000 metres at the 1988 Winter Olympics in Calgary, but was denied full Olympic acclamation because short track speed skating was just a demonstration event that year. O'Reilly won the overall World Championship title in Sydney in 1991.

O'Reilly had a disastrous 1994 Olympics in Lillehammer where he crashed out of both the 500 metres and 1000 metres, protesting about being forced to race with a damaged blade.

He was honoured by TeamGB by being given the flag bearer role at the 1994 Olympics Closing Ceremony.

== Commentating ==
O'Reilly commentated alongside Hugh Porter for BBC Sport on Speed skating at the Winter Olympics in both 2010 in Vancouver and 2014 in Sochi, and partnered Simon Brotherton in 2018 in PyeongChang, 2022 in Beijing and 2026 in Milan.

== Honours ==
O'Reilly was appointed Member of the Order of the British Empire (MBE) in the 1997 Birthday Honours for services to Short Track Speed Skating. He is currently a member of the ISU Short Track Speed Skating World Cup Management Commission.

== Personal life ==
O'Reilly was born in England to an African-American father and an Irish mother.
