= Edin Terzić (alpine skier) =

Yugoslav alpine skier (born 1969)

Personal information
- Nationality: Yugoslav
- Born: 25 April 1969 (age 55)

Sport
- Sport: Alpine skiing

Edin Terzić (born 25 April 1969) is a Yugoslav alpine skier. He competed in two events at the 1992 Winter Olympics.
