= Admir Jamak =

Yugoslav biathlete (born 1970)

Personal information
- Nationality: Yugoslav
- Born: 2 October 1970 (age 54)

Sport
- Sport: Biathlon

Admir Jamak (born 2 October 1970) is a Yugoslav biathlete. He competed in the men's 20 km individual event at the 1992 Winter Olympics.
