= Hugh Hutchison =

British freestyle skier

Personal information
- Born: 17 November 1964 (age 60); Dunfermline, Scotland

Sport
- Sport: Freestyle skiing

Hugh Hutchison (born 17 November 1964) is a British freestyle skier. He competed at the 1992 Winter Olympics and the 1994 Winter Olympics.
