= Zoran Perušina =

Yugoslav alpine skier (born 1970)

Personal information
- Nationality: Yugoslav
- Born: 13 April 1970 (age 54)

Sport
- Sport: Alpine skiing

Zoran Perušina (born 13 April 1970) is a Yugoslav alpine skier. He competed in four events at the 1992 Winter Olympics.
