= Willy Raine =

Canadian alpine skier (born 1970)

Willy Raine (born 5 January 1970 in Whistler, British Columbia) is a retired Canadian alpine skier who competed in the 1992 Winter Olympics. He is a retired technical ski coach for Alpine Canada.

Raine is the son of Nancy Greene and Al Raine.
