= Li Gyong-ok =

North Korean figure skater

Personal information
- Nationality: North Korean
- Born: 15 August 1975 (age 51)

Sport
- Sport: Figure skating

Li Gyong-ok (Korean: 리경옥, born 15 August 1975) is a North Korean figure skater. She competed in the ladies' singles event at the 1992 Winter Olympics, where she placed 27th and did not advance to the free skate.
