= Choi Mi-ok =

North Korean alpine skier (born 1971)

Personal information
- Born: November 13, 1971 (age 53)

Sport
- Country: North Korea
- Sport: alpine skiing

Choi Mi-ok (born 13 October 1971) is a former North Korean female alpine skier. She represented North Korea at the 1992 Winter Olympics, competing in the alpine skiing event.
