= Ryu Gwang-ho =

North Korean ice dancer

Personal information
- Nationality: North Korean
- Born: 21 July 1970 (age 54)

Sport
- Sport: Figure skating

Ryu Gwang-ho (born 21 July 1970) is a North Korean ice dancer. She competed in the ice dance event at the 1992 Winter Olympics.
