= Ghalia Sebti =

Moroccan skier (born 1968)

Personal information
- Nationality: Moroccan
- Born: 19 July 1968 (age 56)

Sport
- Sport: Alpine skiing

Ghalia Sebti (born 19 July 1968) is a Moroccan alpine skier. She competed in two events at the 1992 Winter Olympics.
