= Chus Cortina =

Mexican alpine skier (born 1974)

Personal information
- Nationality: Mexican
- Born: 14 October 1974 (age 50)

Sport
- Sport: Alpine skiing

Chus Cortina (born 14 October 1974) is a Mexican alpine skier. She competed in two events at the 1992 Winter Olympics.
