= Sammantha Teuscher =

Mexican alpine skier (born 1972)

Personal information
- Nationality: Mexican
- Born: 7 July 1972 (age 52)

Sport
- Sport: Alpine skiing

Sammantha Teuscher (born 7 July 1972) is a Mexican alpine skier. She competed in two events at the 1992 Winter Olympics.
