= Valerie Scott (alpine skier) =

British alpine skier (born 1967)

Valerie Scott (born 21 April 1967 in Edinburgh) is a British former alpine skier who competed in the 1992 Winter Olympics.
