= Martin Bell (skier) =

British alpine skier (born 1964)

Martin Bell (born 6 December 1964, RAF Akrotiri, Cyprus) is a British former World Cup alpine ski racer.

Bell was educated at George Watson's College in Edinburgh and the Stams Schigymnasium in Austria. He competed in four Winter Olympics from 1984 to 1994, placing eighth in the downhill at the 1988 Games in Calgary, Canada – the best result for a male skier from the UK in Olympic history.

He also competed at five World Championships from 1985 to 1993. Martin Bell and his brother, Graham Bell were the two most successful British skiers in the 1980s and 1990s.

As of 2017, Bell lives near Vail, Colorado, US. He is married to Laura Bell and has two daughters, Reece (also a ski racer) and Imogen (British archer).
