= Claire de Pourtales =

British alpine skier (born 1969)

Claire de Pourtales (born 20 April 1969, in Paris) is a British former alpine skier who competed in the 1992 Winter Olympics (Alpine Skiing, Slalom, and Combined) and in the 1994 Winter Olympics (Alpine skiing and Slalom). She now lives in Exeter.
