= Kenneth Rudd =

British biathlete (born 1968)

Personal information
- Nationality: British
- Born: 16 May 1968 (age 56); Westow, England

Sport
- Sport: Biathlon

Kenneth Rudd (born 16 May 1968) is a British biathlete. He competed at the 1992 Winter Olympics and the 1994 Winter Olympics.
