= Marina Vidović =

Yugoslav alpine skier (born 1973)

Personal information
- Nationality: Yugoslav
- Born: 13 September 1973 (age 53)

Sport
- Sport: Alpine skiing

Marina Vidović (born 13 September 1973) is a Yugoslav former alpine skier. She competed in four events at the 1992 Winter Olympics.
