= Mark Tout =

English bobsledder

Mark Tout (born 24 January 1961) is an English bobsledder who competed from the mid-1980s to the mid-1990s. Born in Hitchin, Hertfordshire, he attended Cambridgeshire High School for Boys from 1972 to 1977. Competing in four Winter Olympics, he earned his best finish of fifth in the four-man event at Lillehammer in 1994.

His best finish in the Bobsleigh World cup was second in the four-man event in 1994–5.

Tout later received a lifetime ban for testing positive for stanozolol in 1997, but was reinstated in 2001 after his lifetime ban was turned into a four-year ban.
