= Vesna Dunimagloska =

Yugoslav alpine skier (born 1976)

Personal information
- Nationality: Yugoslav
- Born: 4 June 1976 (age 50) Bitola, SR Macedonia, SFR Yugoslavia

Sport
- Sport: Alpine skiing

Vesna Dunimagloska (born 4 June 1976) is a Macedonian alpine skier. She competed for Yugoslavia in two events at the 1992 Winter Olympics.
