= Verónica Ampudia =

Mexican alpine skier (born 1973)

Verónica Ampudia Niño de Rivera (born 31 July 1973) is a Mexican alpine skier who participated in the 1992 Winter Olympics in Albertville, France.
