= Nawal Slaoui =

Moroccan alpine skier (born 1966)

Personal information
- Nationality: Moroccan
- Born: 16 February 1966 (age 59)

Sport
- Sport: Alpine skiing

Nawal Slaoui (born 16 February 1966) is a Moroccan alpine skier. She competed in three events at the 1992 Winter Olympics.
