= Lenox Paul =

British bobsledder

Lenox "Lenny" Paul (born 25 May 1958) is a British bobsledder who competed from the mid-1980s to the mid-1990s. Competing in four Winter Olympics, he earned his best finish of fifth in the four-man event at Lillehammer in 1994. He also served in the British armed forces. He then mentored young people in Ipswich, Suffolk, England at Copleston High School.
