= George Farrell (bobsleigh) =

British bobsledder

Personal information
- Born: 14 August 1964 (age 61) St Albans, Hertfordshire, Great Britain

George Farrell (born 14 August 1964 in St Albans) is a British bobsledder who competed in the early 1990s. Competing in two Winter Olympics, he earned his best finish of fifth in the four-man event at Lillehammer in 1994.
