= Emma Carrick-Anderson =

British alpine skier (born 1975)

- Born: 17 June 1975; Stirling, Scotland
- Known for: British alpine skier
- Spouse: Phil Smith
- Children: 3

Emma Carrick-Anderson (born 17 June 1975) is a Scottish former alpine skier who competed for Great Britain at the Winter Olympic Games in 1992, 1994, 1998 and 2002.

== Skiing career ==
Originally from Dunblane, Carrick-Anderson began skiing at the age of two and was racing by the age of six; she spent four years attending the Austrian Ski School in Schladming. In 1992, she was named as the Scottish Skier of the Year.

Carrick-Anderson made her debut at the 1992 Winter Olympics at the age of sixteen. She competed in four Olympics, six World Championships, and numerous World Cups.

Olympic Games	Event	Finishing Position
Albertville 1992	Women's Combined	17
Albertville 1992	Women's Slalom	19
Albertville 1992	Women's Giant Slalom	22
Lillehammer 1994	Women's Slalom	DNF
Lillehammer 1994	Women's Giant Slalom	DNF
Nagano 1998	Women's Slalom	DNF
Salt Lake City 2002	Women's Slalom	19

== Post-Skiing ==
She announced her retirement in 2003, stating that while she remained motivated she was "fed up with living out of a suitcase." She had also found it difficult to adapt to the new skis that came into use for competition.

Following her retirement, she relocated to the French Alps to work as a ski instructor, and has done commentary work for Eurosport and the BBC.

Carrick-Anderson now focuses her time on coaching her three boys – Zak, Freddy and Luca – who are all competing on the Europa Cup circuit. "When they were young, skiing was fun. I think a lot of kids get pushed into ski racing too early."

== Personal life ==
Her elder brother Crawford was also a skier, but achieved success as a mountain bike racer.

Carrick-Anderson married Phil Smith, a fellow skier, in 2004. The couple have three sons, all of whom have followed in their parents' footsteps as keen competitive skiers.
