= United States at the 1994 Winter Olympics =

- Flag of the United States
- IOC code: USA
- NOC: United States Olympic Committee

in Lillehammer
- Competitors: 147 (95 men, 52 women) in 6 sports
- Flag bearer: Cammy Myler (luge)
- Medals Ranked 5th: Gold 6 Silver 5 Bronze 2 Total 13

Winter Olympics appearances (overview)
- 1924; 1928; 1932; 1936; 1948; 1952; 1956; 1960; 1964; 1968; 1972; 1976; 1980; 1984; 1988; 1992; 1994; 1998; 2002; 2006; 2010; 2014; 2018; 2022; 2026

The United States competed at the 1994 Winter Olympics in Lillehammer, Norway.

== Medalists ==
The following U.S. competitors won medals at the games. In the by discipline sections below, medalists' names are bolded.

Medal	Name	Sport	Event	Date
Gold	Tommy Moe	Alpine skiing	Men's downhill	February 13
Gold	Diann Roffe	Alpine skiing	Women's super-G	February 15
Gold	Dan Jansen	Speed skating	Men's 1000 meters	February 18
Gold	Bonnie Blair	Speed skating	Women's 500 meters	February 19
Gold	Bonnie Blair	Speed skating	Women's 1000 meters	February 23
Gold	Cathy Turner	Short track speed skating	Women's 500 meters	February 24
Silver	Picabo Street	Alpine skiing	Women's downhill	February 15
Silver	Elizabeth McIntyre	Freestyle skiing	Women's moguls	February 16
Silver	Tommy Moe	Alpine skiing	Men's super-G	February 17
Silver	Nancy Kerrigan	Figure skating	Women's singles	February 25
Silver	Randy Bartz; John Coyle; Eric Flaim; Andrew Gabel	Short track speed skating	Men's 5000 meter relay	February 26
Bronze	Amy Peterson	Short track speed skating	Women's 500 meters	February 24
Bronze	Karen Cashman; Amy Peterson; Cathy Turner; Nikki Ziegelmeyer	Short track speed skating	Women's 3000 meter relay	February 24

Medals by sport
Sport	1st place, gold medalist(s)	2nd place, silver medalist(s)	3rd place, bronze medalist(s)	Total
Speed skating	3	0	0	**3**
Alpine skiing	2	2	0	**4**
Short track speed skating	1	1	2	**4**
Figure skating	0	1	0	**1**
Freestyle skiing	0	1	0	**1**
Total	6	5	2	13

Medals by gender
Gender	1st place, gold medalist(s)	2nd place, silver medalist(s)	3rd place, bronze medalist(s)	Total	Percentage
Female	4	3	2	**9**	69.2%
Male	2	2	0	**4**	30.8%
Total	6	5	2	13	100%

Multiple medalists
Name	Sport	1st place, gold medalist(s)	2nd place, silver medalist(s)	3rd place, bronze medalist(s)	Total
Bonnie Blair	Speed skating	2	0	0	**2**
Tommy Moe	Alpine skiing	1	1	0	**2**
Cathy Turner	Short track speed skating	1	0	1	**2**
Amy Peterson	Short track speed skating	0	0	2	**2**

== Competitors ==
The following is the list of number of competitors in the Games.

Sport	Men	Women	Total
Alpine skiing	10	12	22
Biathlon	4	5	9
Bobsleigh	10	–	10
Cross-country skiing	8	8	16
Figure skating	6	6	12
Freestyle skiing	6	6	12
Ice hockey	22	–	22
Luge	7	3	10
Nordic combined	4	–	4
Short track speed skating	4	4	8
Ski jumping	6	–	6
Speed skating	8	8	16
Total	95	52	147

== Alpine skiing ==
Men

Athlete	Event	Run 1		Run 2		Run 3		Total	
Athlete	Event	Time	Rank	Time	Rank	Time	Rank	Time	Rank
A J Kitt	Downhill	—N/a						1:46.82	17
Tommy Moe	Downhill	—N/a						1:45.75	1st place, gold medalist(s)
Kyle Rasmussen	Downhill	—N/a						1:46.35	11
Craig Thrasher	Downhill	—N/a						1:48.91	38
Chad Fleischer	Combined	1:40.17	28	DNF					
Tommy Moe	Combined	1:37.14	3	52.93	17	49.34	9	3:19.41	5
Kyle Rasmussen	Combined	1:36.96	2	1:08.24	37	52.34	27	3:37.54	31
Craig Thrasher	Combined	1:40.36	31	DNF					
Chad Fleischer	Super-G	—N/a						DNF	
A J Kitt	Super-G	—N/a						DSQ	
Tommy Moe	Super-G	—N/a						1:32.61	2nd place, silver medalist(s)
Kyle Rasmussen	Super-G	—N/a						DSQ	
Jeremy Nobis	Giant slalom	1:29.02	6	1:24.58	14	—N/a		2:53.60	9
Harper Phillips	Giant slalom	1:30.31	21	DNF		—N/a		DNF	
Casey Puckett	Giant slalom	DNF				—N/a		DNF	
Erik Schlopy	Giant slalom	1:42.26	44	1:27.74	31	—N/a		3:10.00	34
Matt Grosjean	Slalom	48.32	3	DNF		—N/a		DNF	
Jeremy Nobis	Slalom	1:04.86	25	DNF		—N/a		DNF	
Casey Puckett	Slalom	1:02.97	14	1:00.50	5	—N/a		2:03.47	7
Erik Schlopy	Slalom	DNF				—N/a		DNF	

Women

Athlete	Event	Run 1		Run 2		Run 3		Total	
Athlete	Event	Time	Rank	Time	Rank	Time	Rank	Time	Rank
Megan Gerety	Downhill	—N/a						1:38.24	20
Hilary Lindh	Downhill	—N/a						1:37.44	7
Krista Schmidinger	Downhill	—N/a						1:38.76	27
Picabo Street	Downhill	—N/a						1:36.59	2nd place, silver medalist(s)
Julie Parisien	Combined	DSQ							
Monique Pelletier	Combined	1:30.36	24	1:19.01	27	49.42	15	3:38.79	24
Picabo Street	Combined	1:28.19	2	52.59	13	49.37	14	3:10.15	10
Megan Gerety	Super-G	—N/a						DNF	
Hilary Lindh	Super-G	—N/a						1:23.38	13
Shannon Nobis	Super-G	—N/a						1:23.02	10
Diann Roffe	Super-G	—N/a						1:22.15	1st place, gold medalist(s)
Diann Roffe	Giant slalom	1:23.99	27	DNF		—N/a		DNF	
Anne-Lise Parisien	Giant slalom	1:23.55	24	1:12.89	9	—N/a		2:36.44	13
Eva Twardokens	Giant slalom	1:22.12	12	1:12.29	7	—N/a		2:34.41	6
Heidi Voelker	Giant slalom	1:23.08	18	DNF		—N/a		DNF	
Julie Parisien	Slalom	1:01.61	21	DSQ		—N/a		DSQ	
Monique Pelletier	Slalom	1:01.87	24	DSQ		—N/a		DSQ	
Carrie Sheinberg	Slalom	1:01.63	22	58.53	16	—N/a		2:00.16	18
Eva Twardokens	Slalom	1:01.47	19	DNF		—N/a		DNF	

== Biathlon ==
Men

Athlete	Event	Time	Misses	Rank
Jon Engen	Individual	1:06:39.7	4 (2+2+0+0)	64
Curt Schreiner	Individual	1:07:41.6	6 (1+1+2+2)	65
Duncan Douglas	Sprint	33:29.2	3 (1+2)	65
Dave Jareckie	Sprint	33:15.6	4 (2+2)	64
Duncan Douglas; Jon Engen; Dave Jareckie; Curt Schreiner	Relay	1:35:43.7	0 (0+0)	14

Women

Athlete	Event	Time	Misses	Rank
Beth Coats	Individual	57:20.0	4 (1+1+1+1)	33
Joan Guetschow	Individual	55:19.4	1 (0+0+0+1)	17
Joan Smith	Individual	54:46.7	3 (0+1+1+1)	14
Laura Tavares	Individual	57:04.3	4 (1+1+1+1)	32
Beth Coats	Sprint	29:24.3	3 (3+0)	51
Joan Guetschow	Sprint	29:26.7	4 (1+3)	52
Mary Ostergren	Sprint	30:35.6	4 (3+1)	64
Joan Smith	Sprint	27:39.1	2 (0+2)	24
Beth Coats; Joan Guetschow; Joan Smith; Laura Tavares	Relay	1:57:35.9	3 (0+3)	8

== Bobsleigh ==
Athlete	Event	Run 1		Run 2		Run 3		Run 4		Total	
Athlete	Event	Time	Rank	Time	Rank	Time	Rank	Time	Rank	Time	Rank
Jim Herberich; Chip Minton	Two-man	53.04	15	53.58	17	53.29	15	53.50	13	3:33.41	14
Brian Shimer; Randy Jones	Two-man	52.99	12	53.37	11	52.86	5	53.63	17	3:32.85	13
Randy Will; Jeff Woodard; Joe Sawyer; Chris Coleman	Four-man	52.03	8	52.42	12	52.77	19	52.75	17	3:29.97	15
Brian Shimer; Bryan Leturgez; Karlos Kirby; Randy Jones	Four-man	52.25	13	52.29	9	DNF					

== Cross-country skiing ==
Men

Athlete	Event	Time	Rank
John Aalberg	10 km classical	27:02.3	45
Luke Bodensteiner	10 km classical	27:22.3	58
Todd Boonstra	10 km classical	26:56.3	41
Ben Husaby	10 km classical	27:11.3	52
John Aalberg	15 km freestyle pursuit	1:05:33.4	33
Luke Bodensteiner	15 km freestyle pursuit	1:06:53.0	45
Todd Boonstra	15 km freestyle pursuit	1:06:07.1	41
Ben Husaby	15 km freestyle pursuit	1:06:35.9	43
John Aalberg	30 km freestyle	1:21:45.1	43
Luke Bodensteiner	30 km freestyle	1:20:13.0	36
Marcus Nash	30 km freestyle	1:27:18.7	65
Carl Swenson	30 km freestyle	1:22:08.6	45
Todd Boonstra	50 km classical	2:20:41.0	39
Ben Husaby	50 km classical	2:23:37.3	53
Pete Vordenberg	50 km classical	2:22:53.1	49
Justin Wadsworth	50 km classical	2:19:49.1	35
John Aalberg; Luke Bodensteiner; Todd Boonstra; Ben Husaby	4x10 km relay	1:49:40.5	13

Women

Athlete	Event	Time	Rank
Ingrid Butts	5 km classical	16:33.6	53
Nina Kemppel	5 km classical	15:44.8	28
Karen Petty	5 km classical	16:52.5	59
Leslie Thompson	5 km classical	16:08.0	40
Ingrid Butts	10 km freestyle pursuit	48:39.6	50
Nina Kemppel	10 km freestyle pursuit	46:21.8	31
Karen Petty	10 km freestyle pursuit	DNF	
Leslie Thompson	10 km freestyle pursuit	46:30.6	32
Nina Kemppel	15 km freestyle	46:56.8	42
Laura McCabe	15 km freestyle	45:51.1	34
Leslie Thompson	15 km freestyle	46:10.3	37
Laura Wilson	15 km freestyle	45:59.9	35
Nina Kemppel	30 km classical	1:32:55.3	27
Suzanne King	30 km classical	1:45:27.9	51
Laura Wilson	30 km classical	1:38:52.6	49
Dorcas Wonsavage	30 km classical	1:36:34.1	40
Nina Kemppel; Laura McCabe; Leslie Thompson; Laura Wilson	4x5 km relay	1:02:28.4	10

== Figure skating ==
Individual

Athlete	Event	SP	FS	Total	
Athlete	Event	Rank	Rank	TFP	Rank
Brian Boitano	Men's singles	8 Q	6	10.0	6
Scott Davis	Men's singles	4 Q	8	10.0	8
Tonya Harding	Ladies' singles	10 Q	7	12.0	8
Nancy Kerrigan	Ladies' singles	1 Q	2	2.5	2nd place, silver medalist(s)

Mixed

Athlete	Event	CD1	CD2	SP / OD	FS / FD	Total	
Athlete	Event	Rank	Rank	Rank	Rank	TFP	Rank
Karen Courtland; Todd Reynolds	Pairs	—N/a		13	14	20.5	14
Kyoko Ina; Jason Dungjen	Pairs	—N/a		15	7	14.5	9
Jenni Meno; Todd Sand	Pairs	—N/a		6	5	8.0	5
Elizabeth Punsalan; Jerod Swallow	Ice dancing	14	14	14	15	15.0	15

== Freestyle skiing ==
Aerials
Men

Athlete	Event	Qualification				Final			
Athlete	Event	Jump 1	Jump 2	Total	Rank	Jump 1	Jump 2	Total	Rank
Eric Bergoust	Aerials	93.89	96.59	190.48	12 Q	98.12	112.36	210.48	7
Kris Feddersen	Aerials	104.50	94.77	199.27	9 Q	91.58	103.68	195.26	11
Trace Worthington	Aerials	117.03	104.08	221.11	4 Q	102.57	115.62	218.19	5

Women

Athlete	Event	Qualification				Final			
Athlete	Event	Jump 1	Jump 2	Total	Rank	Jump 1	Jump 2	Total	Rank
Tracy Evans	Aerials	76.86	71.05	147.91	8 Q	76.70	63.07	139.77	7
Kristean Porter	Aerials	66.26	24.88	91.14	20	Did not advance			
Nikki Stone	Aerials	79.60	64.26	143.86	13	Did not advance			

Moguls
Men

Athlete	Event	Qualifying		Final	
Athlete	Event	Points	Rank	Points	Rank
Troy Benson	Moguls	24.42	13 Q	24.86	8
Craig Rodman	Moguls	23.98	18	Did not advance	
Sean Smith	Moguls	24.31	16 Q	23.43	13
Trace Worthington	Moguls	23.79	19	Did not advance	

Women

Athlete	Event	Qualifying		Final	
Athlete	Event	Points	Rank	Points	Rank
Ann Battelle	Moguls	23.63	8 Q	23.71	8
Liz McIntyre	Moguls	25.23	1 Q	25.89	2nd place, silver medalist(s)
Donna Weinbrecht	Moguls	23.96	6 Q	24.38	7

== Ice hockey ==
Summary

Team	Event	Preliminary round						Quarterfinal	Semifinal / PS	Final / BM / PF	
Team	Event	Opposition Score	Opposition Score	Opposition Score	Opposition Score	Opposition Score	Rank	Opposition Score	Opposition Score	Opposition Score	Rank
United States men's	Men's tournament	France; T 4–4	Slovakia; T 3–3	Canada; T 3–3	Sweden; L 4–6	Italy; W 7–1	4 Q	Finland; L 1–6	5-8th place semifinal Czech Republic; L 3–5	7th place final Germany; L 3–4	8

Roster

- Mike Dunham
- Garth Snow
- Ted Crowley
- Brett Hauer
- Chris Imes
- Peter Laviolette (captain)
- Todd Marchant
- Matt Martin
- Travis Richards
- Barry Richter
- Mark Beaufait
- Jim Campbell
- Peter Ciavaglia
- Ted Drury
- Peter Ferraro
- Darby Hendrickson
- Craig Johnson
- Jeff Lazaro
- John Lilley
- David Roberts
- Brian Rolston
- David Sacco
- Head coach: Tim Taylor

Group play

Pos	Team	Pld	W	D	L	GF	GA	GD	Pts	Qualification
1	Slovakia	5	3	2	0	26	14	+12	8	Quarterfinals
2	Canada	5	3	1	1	17	11	+6	7 (Note: Sweden 2–3 Canada)	Quarterfinals
3	Sweden	5	3	1	1	23	13	+10	7	Quarterfinals
4	United States	5	1	3	1	21	17	+4	5	Quarterfinals
5	Italy	5	1	0	4	15	31	−16	2	9–12th place semifinals
6	France	5	0	1	4	11	27	−16	1	9–12th place semifinals

Notes:

13 February 1994; 20:00	France	4–4 (1–2, 1–0, 2–2)	United States	Håkons Hall, Lillehammer; Attendance: 8,145

Petri Ylönen
Goalies
Mike Dunham
Referee:
(Finland) Mika Lepaus
Linesmen:
(Canada) Lonnie Cameron
(Canada) Pierre Tremblay

	0–1	05:04 − Lilley (Beaufait)
Saunier − 15:16	1–1
	1–2	17:43 − Ferraro (Johnson)
Pajonkowski − 38:10	2–2
Agnel − 42:36	3–2
Maia (Poudrier, Laporte) (SH) − 47:48	4–2
	4–3	51:23 − Laviolette
	4–4	53:58 − Rolston (Ciavaglia)

16 min
Penalties
6 min
14
Shots
32

15 February 1994; 17:30	United States	3–3 (1–1, 0–1, 2–1)	Slovakia	Gjøvik Olympic Cavern Hall, Gjøvik; Attendance: 5,200

Garth Snow
Goalies
Eduard Hartmann
Referee:
(Russia) Valery Bokarev
Linesmen:
(Sweden) Stephan Eriksson
(Sweden) Johan Norrman

Lazaro (Crowley) − 10:23	1–0
	1–1	13:55 − Kolník (Haščák)
	1–2	39:24 − Šťastný (Pálffy)
	1–3	46:58 − Švehla (PP)
Ciavaglia (Beaufait, Sacco) (PP) − 54:23	2–3
Lilley − 55:59	3–3

22 min
Penalties
35 min
18
Shots
33

17 February 1994; 20:00	Canada	3–3 (1–0, 1–2, 1–1)	United States	Håkons Hall, Lillehammer; Attendance: 9,245

Corey Hirsch
Goalies
Garth Snow
Referee:
(Sweden) Börje Johansson
Linesmen:
(Sweden) Stephan Eriksson
(Sweden) Johan Norrman

Norris (Savage, Warriner) − 04:46	1–0
	1–1	21:06 − Rolston (Sacco, Roberts)
	1–2	29:43 − Rolston (Beaufait, Roberts) (PP2)
Nedvěd (PS) − 32.09	2–2
Norris − 41:16	3–2
	3–3	59:32 − Marchant (Roberts) (PP)

14 min
Penalties

32
Shots
29

19 February 1994; 20:00	United States	4–6 (1–2, 0–2, 3–2)	Sweden	Håkons Hall, Lillehammer; Attendance: 9,245

Mike Dunham
Goalies
Tommy Salo
Referee:
(Czech Republic) Petr Bolina
Linesmen:
(Canada) Lonnie Cameron
(Canada) Pierre Tremblay

	0–1	10:38 − Juhlin (Näslund)
Lilley (Lazaro) − 10:38	1–1
	1–2	16:05 − Juhlin (Svensson, Berglund)
	1–3	32:51 − Juhlin (Näslund, Rohlin) (PP)
	1–4	35:21 − Hansson
Ferraro (Johnson, Crowley) − 43:25	2–4
Rolston (Drury, Ciavaglia) − 45:29	3–4
	3–5	49:25 − Johansson (Juhlin) (PP)
Rolston (Roberts, Sacco) (PP) − 50:51	4–5
	4–6	59:01 − Loob

16 min
Penalties
10 min
25
Shots
37

21 February 1994; 20:00	United States	7–1 (5–1, 1–0, 1–0)	Italy	Håkons Hall, Lillehammer; Attendance: 9,243

Garth Snow
Goalies
David Delfino
Bruno Campese
Referee:
(Canada) Kevin Muench
Linesmen:
(Norway) Erik Larssen
(Norway) John Svarstad

Ciavaglia (Martin) − 01:50	1–0
Ferraro (Martin) − 03:59	2–0
Sacco (Ciavaglia) (PP) − 08:58	3–0
Roberts (Lilley) − 13:03	4–0
Ferraro (Johnson, Marchant) − 14:31	5–0
	5–1	16:30 − Iovio (Figliuzzi)
Rolston (Drury, Richter) − 36:47	6–1
Rolston (Ciavaglia) − 59:29	7–1

8 min
Penalties
16 min
47
Shots
16

Quarterfinal

23 February; 16:30	Finland	6–1 (2–0, 2–1, 2–0)	United States	Lillehammer, Håkons Hall; Attendance: 9,046

Jarmo Myllys
Goalies
Garth Snow
Referee:
(Canada) Kevin Muench
Linesmen:
(Germany) Wilhelm Schimm
(Czech Republic) Václav Český

Koivu (PP) – 12:51	1–0
Nieminen (Keskinen) (SH) – 16:08	2–0
	2–1	20:54 – Sacco (Lazaro) (SH)
Nieminen – 24:05	3–1
Virta (Kiprusoff, Keskinen) (PP) – 26:21	4–1
Kiprusoff (Koivu) (PP) – 46:59	5–1
Ojanen (Jutila, Kiprusoff) (PP) – 55:11	6–1

18 min
Penalties
22 min
36
Shots
28

5-8th place semifinal

24 February; 19:30	Czech Republic	5–3 (3–2, 1–0, 1–1)	United States	Gjøvik, Fjellhallen; Attendance: 5,078

Petr Bříza
Goalies
Mike Dunham
Referee:
(Norway) Tor Hansen
Linesmen:
(Russia) Sergey Feofanov
(Germany) Wilhelm Schimm

	0–1	02:50 – Ferraro (Sacco, Johnson)
	0–2	04:08 – Lazaro (Beaufait)
Kučera (Doležal) – 14:37	1–2
Geffert (Žemlička, Hrbek) – 16:14	2–2
Hrbek (Geffert, Žemlička) (PP) – 18:43	3–2
Doležal (Vopat, Janecký) – 35:25	4–2
Geffert (Žemlička, Hrbek) – 44:42	5–2
	5–3	59:32 – Beaufait

16 min
Penalties
20 min
35
Shots
28

Seventh place game

26 February; 16:30	Germany	4–3 (1–1, 1–1, 2–1)	United States	Håkons Hall, Lillehammer; Attendance: 9,045

Josef Heiß
Goalies
Garth Snow
Referee:
(Canada) Kevin Muench
Linesmen:
(Russia) Sergey Feofanov
(Canada) Lonnie Cameron

Stefan (Brandl, Meyer) (PP) – 11:03	1–0
	1–1	17:44 – Sacco (Richter)
	1–2	26:27 – Drury (Roberts, Sacco) (PP)
Mayr (Handrick) – 29:34	2–2
Hilger (Ustorf, Mayr) – 49:57	3–2
Hegen – 52:20	4–2
	4–3	52:35 – Ferraro (Richter)

2 min
Penalties
10 min
26
Shots
29

== Luge ==
Men

Athlete(s)	Event	Run 1		Run 2		Run 3		Run 4		Total	
Athlete(s)	Event	Time	Rank	Time	Rank	Time	Rank	Time	Rank	Time	Rank
Duncan Kennedy	Singles	50.587	6	50.633	4	DNF					
Robert Pipkins	Singles	51.248	17	51.332	17	50.885	15	51.115	16	3:24.580	16
Wendel Suckow	Singles	50.698	10	50.819	7	50.359	5	50.548	4	3:22.424	5
Jonathan Edwards; Mark Grimmette	Doubles	48.617	5	48.672	4	—N/a				1:37.289	4
Gordy Sheer; Chris Thorpe	Doubles	48.571	4	48.725	6	—N/a				1:37.296	5

Women

Athlete	Event	Run 1		Run 2		Run 3		Run 4		Total	
Athlete	Event	Time	Rank	Time	Rank	Time	Rank	Time	Rank	Time	Rank
Bethany Calcaterra	Singles	49.733	14	49.542	12	49.304	7	49.426	9	3:18.005	12
Cammy Myler	Singles	49.201	8	49.763	15	49.324	10	49.546	14	3:17.834	11
Erin Warren	Singles	DNF									

== Nordic combined ==
Athlete	Event	Ski jumping		Cross-country		Total	
Athlete	Event	Points	Rank	Time	Rank	Time	Rank
Ryan Heckman	Individual	191.5	30	41:05.07	29	47:15.7	29
Dave Jarrett	Individual	195.0	34	39:34.4	12	47:30.4	35
Todd Lodwick	Individual	232.0	5	42:41.2	43	44:21.2	13
Tim Tetreault	Individual	186.5	35	40:34.0	24	47:17.0	41
Ryan Heckman; Dave Jarrett; Todd Lodwick	Team	602.0	7	1:25:10.4	8	1:36:07.4	7

== Short track speed skating ==
Men

Athlete	Event	Heat		Quarterfinal		Semifinal		Final	
Athlete	Event	Time	Rank	Time	Rank	Time	Rank	Time	Rank
John Coyle	500m	45.42	3	Did not advance					19
Eric Flaim	500m	44.71	4	Did not advance					25
Andy Gabel	500m	44.31	2 Q	48.91	3	Did not advance			14
John Coyle	1000m	1:32.92	3	Did not advance					19
Eric Flaim	1000m	1:33.71	2 Q	1:29.70	3	Did not advance			10
Andy Gabel	1000m	1:32.32	1 Q	1:33.59	3	Did not advance			9
Randy Bartz; John Coyle; Eric Flaim; Andy Gabel	5000m relay	—N/a				7:18.58	3 Q	7:13.37	2nd place, silver medalist(s)

Women

Athlete	Event	Heat		Quarterfinal		Semifinal		Final	
Athlete	Event	Time	Rank	Time	Rank	Time	Rank	Time	Rank
Amy Peterson	500m	47.02	1 Q	46.59	1 Q	46.28	2 Q	46.76	3rd place, bronze medalist(s)
Cathy Turner	500m	46.22 OR	1 Q	47.24	2 Q	47.54	1 Q	45.98	1st place, gold medalist(s)
Amy Peterson	1000m	1:45.38	2 Q	1:39.51	3	Did not advance			13
Cathy Turner	1000m	1:47.03	2 Q	1:38.98	2 Q	DSQ		Did not advance	8
Karen Cashman; Amy Peterson; Cathy Turner; Nikki Ziegelmeyer	3000m relay	—N/a				4:35.52	3 Q	4:39.34	3rd place, bronze medalist(s)

Shana Sundstrom was an alternate of the American short track relay team.

== Ski jumping ==
Athlete	Event	Jump 1		Jump 2		Total	
Athlete	Event	Points	Rank	Points	Rank	Total	Rank
Jim Holland	Normal hill	85.0	52	73.0	45	158.0	48
Bob Holme	Normal hill	97.0	41	98.0	31	195.0	35
Ted Langlois	Normal hill	108.5	31	88.5	37	197.0	33
Randy Weber	Normal hill	86.5	51	84.0	40	170.5	44
Jim Holland	Large hill	42.1	49	60.8	40	102.9	46
Bob Holme	Large hill	47.3	47	37.7	53	85.0	50
Ted Langlois	Large hill	71.6	34	63.6	35	135.2	35
Randy Weber	Large hill	30.7	51	39.0	52	69.7	53
Greg Boester; Ted Langlois; Kurt Stein; Randy Weber	Team	235.2	11	269.8	11	505.0	11

== Speed skating ==
Men

Athlete	Event	Time	Rank
Dave Besteman	500 m	37.68	27
Dave Cruikshank	500 m	37.37	19
Dan Jansen	500 m	36.68	8
Nate Mills	500 m	37.41	20
Dave Besteman	1000 m	1:15.62	30
Brendan Eppert	1000 m	1:16.07	35
Dan Jansen	1000 m	1:12.43 WR	1st place, gold medalist(s)
Nate Mills	1000 m	1:15.11	21
K. C. Boutiette	1500 m	2:00.59	39
Nate Mills	1500 m	1:58.43	37
Dave Tamburrino	1500 m	1:55.78	22
Brian Wanek	1500 m	1:57.09	32
Brian Wanek	5000 m	7:05.95	30

Women

Athlete	Event	Time	Rank
Bonnie Blair	500 m	39.25	1st place, gold medalist(s)
Peggy Clasen	500 m	41.13	23
Michelle Kline	500 m	DSQ	
Kristen Talbot	500 m	41.05	20
Chantal Bailey	1000 m	1:23.52	31
Bonnie Blair	1000 m	1:18.74	1st place, gold medalist(s)
Michelle Kline	1000 m	1:22.44	24
Chris Witty	1000 m	1:22.42	23
Chantal Bailey	1500 m	2:09.68	27
Bonnie Blair	1500 m	2:03.44	4
Michelle Kline	1500 m	2:08.02	20
Angela Zuckerman	1500 m	2:08.43	21
Chantal Bailey	3000 m	4:34.64	22
Chris Scheels	3000 m	4:34.14	21
Angela Zuckerman	3000 m	4:33.08	19

== See also ==
- United States at the 1994 Winter Paralympics
