= Cross-country skiing at the 1994 Winter Olympics – Men's 15 kilometre freestyle pursuit =

Men's 15 kilometre freestyle pursuit at the XVII Olympic Winter Games
- Venue: Birkebeineren Ski Stadium
- Dates: 19 February 1994
- Competitors: 88 from 32 nations
- Winning time: 35:48.8

Medalists
| 1st place, gold medalist(s) | | Bjørn Dæhlie; Norway |
| 2nd place, silver medalist(s) | | Vladimir Smirnov; Kazakhstan |
| 3rd place, bronze medalist(s) | | Silvio Fauner; Italy |

The men's 15 kilometre freestyle pursuit cross-country skiing competition at the 1994 Winter Olympics in Lillehammer, Norway, was held on 19 February at Birkebeineren Ski Stadium in Lillehammer.

Each skier started based on the results from the 10 km classical event, skiing the entire 15 kilometre course after the first-to-finish principle. Bjørn Dæhlie of Norway started first in the race with a gap of 18 seconds to Vladimir Smirnov of Kazakhstan. Dæhlie extended his lead and won over Smirnov with 29.2 seconds; his second consecutive olympic gold medal in the pursuit event.

== Background ==
At the previous Olympics, Bjørn Dæhlie won the gold medal. The silver medalist, Vegard Ulvang, and the bronze medalist, Giorgio Vanzetta both qualified for the event. Dæhlie was the 1993 world champion.

== Results ==
| Rank | Bib | Name | Country | Start | Time | Deficit |
|---|---|---|---|---|---|---|
| 1st place, gold medalist(s) | 1 | Bjørn Dæhlie | Norway | 0:00 | 35:48.8 | |
| 2nd place, silver medalist(s) | 2 | Vladimir Smirnov | Kazakhstan | 0:18 | 36:18.0 | +29.2 |
| 3rd place, bronze medalist(s) | 8 | Silvio Fauner | Italy | 0:48 | 37:28.6 | +1:39.8 |
| 4 | 6 | Mika Myllylä | Finland | 0:45 | 37:35.9 | +1:47.1 |
| 5 | 4 | Mikhail Botvinov | Russia | 0:38 | 37:37.8 | +1:49.0 |
| 6 | 12 | Jari Räsänen | Finland | 1:11 | 37:43.7 | +1:54.9 |
| 7 | 5 | Sture Sivertsen | Norway | 0:39 | 37:49.7 | +2:00.9 |
| 8 | 17 | Johann Mühlegg | Germany | 1:30 | 38:11.2 | +2:22.4 |
| 9 | 15 | Giorgio Vanzetta | Italy | 1:28 | 38:11.6 | +2:22.8 |
| 10 | 3 | Marco Albarello | Italy | 0:22 | 38:14.1 | +2:25.3 |
| 11 | 10 | Alois Stadlober | Austria | 1:05 | 38:37.1 | +2:48.3 |
| 12 | 20 | Alexey Prokourorov | Russia | 1:35 | 38:47.8 | +2:59.0 |
| 13 | 21 | Jeremias Wigger | Switzerland | 1:35 | 38:47.9 | +2:59.1 |
| 14 | 11 | Jochen Behle | Germany | 1:09 | 39:12.1 | +3:23.3 |
| 15 | 14 | Jan Ottosson | Sweden | 1:27 | 39:12.4 | +3:23.6 |
| 16 | 13 | Andrey Kirillov | Russia | 1:21 | 39:39.7 | +3:50.9 |
| 17 | 18 | Vladimir Legotine | Russia | 1:32 | 39:40.1 | +3:51.3 |
| 18 | 25 | Kazunari Sasaki | Japan | 1:52 | 39:40.5 | +3:51.7 |
| 19 | 16 | Nikolay Ivanov | Kazakhstan | 1:28 | 39:50.5 | +4:01.7 |
| 20 | 22 | Patrick Rémy | France | 1:37 | 40:00.5 | +4:11.7 |
| 21 | 53 | Viatscheslav Plaksunov | Belarus | 2:52 | 40:15.2 | +4:26.4 |
| 22 | 29 | Fulvio Valbusa | Italy | 2:06 | 40:16.3 | +4:27.5 |
| 23 | 19 | Christer Majbäck | Sweden | 1:35 | 40:22.5 | +4:33.7 |
| 24 | 26 | Luboš Buchta | Czech Republic | 1:57 | 40:34.0 | +4:45.2 |
| 25 | 33 | Elmo Kassin | Estonia | 2:20 | 40:34.9 | +4:46.1 |
| 26 | 34 | Pavel Ryabinin | Kazakhstan | 2:21 | 40:45.6 | +4:56.8 |
| 27 | 31 | Mitsuo Horigome | Japan | 2:16 | 40:47.0 | +4:58.2 |
| 28 | 47 | Juan Jesús Gutiérrez | Spain | 2:46 | 41:00.0 | +5:11.2 |
| 29 | 39 | Philippe Sanchez | France | 2:27 | 41:11.8 | +5:23.0 |
| 30 | 46 | Hans Diethelm | Switzerland | 2:43 | 41:12.4 | +5:23.6 |
| 31 | 37 | Andrey Nevzorov | Kazakhstan | 2:25 | 41:12.9 | +5:24.1 |
| 32 | 44 | Carles Vicente | Spain | 2:41 | 41:13.3 | +5:24.5 |
| 33 | 45 | John Aalberg | United States | 2:42 | 41:13.4 | +5:24.6 |
| 34 | 43 | Ivan Bátory | Slovakia | 2:38 | 41:14.3 | +5:25.5 |
| 35 | 61 | Janko Neuber | Germany | 3:07 | 41:19.6 | +5:30.8 |
| 36 | 65 | Pavel Benc | Czech Republic | 3:18 | 41:24.1 | +5:35.3 |
| 37 | 59 | Václav Korunka | Czech Republic | 3:02 | 41:42.0 | +5:53.2 |
| 38 | 32 | Torald Rein | Germany | 2:18 | 41:42.3 | +5:53.5 |
| 39 | 55 | Markus Hasler | Liechtenstein | 2:57 | 41:45.4 | +5:56.6 |
| 40 | 35 | Jaak Mae | Estonia | 2:22 | 41:46.0 | +5:57.2 |
| 41 | 41 | Todd Boonstra | United States | 2:36 | 41:47.1 | +5:58.3 |
| 42 | 40 | Hiroyuki Imai | Japan | 2:28 | 41:59.8 | +6:11.0 |
| 43 | 52 | Benjamin Husaby | United States | 2:51 | 42:15.9 | +6:27.1 |
| 44 | 56 | Siniša Vukonić | Croatia | 2:57 | 42:25.3 | +6:36.5 |
| 45 | 58 | Luke Bodensteiner | United States | 3:02 | 42:33.0 | +6:44.2 |
| 46 | 62 | Igor Obukhov | Belarus | 3:09 | 42:33.5 | +6:44.7 |
| 47 | 57 | Jordi Ribo | Spain | 3:01 | 42:47.6 | +6:58.8 |
| 48 | 38 | Ricardas Panavas | Lithuania | 2:26 | 42:52.5 | +7:03.7 |
| 49 | 50 | Daníel Jakobsson | Iceland | 2:49 | 42:57.0 | +7:08.2 |
| 50 | 66 | Michael Binzer | Denmark | 3:23 | 42:57.1 | +7:08.3 |
| 51 | 70 | Sergei Dolidovich | Belarus | 3:42 | 43:10.5 | +7:21.7 |
| 52 | 49 | Dany Bouchard | Canada | 2:49 | 43:13.2 | +7:24.4 |
| 53 | 63 | Cédric Vallet | France | 3:10 | 43:24.5 | +7:35.7 |
| 54 | 72 | Masaaki Kozu | Japan | 4:00 | 43:30.1 | +7:41.3 |
| 55 | 36 | Andrus Veerpalu | Estonia | 2:25 | 43:56.1 | +8:07.3 |
| 56 | 60 | Wilhelm Aschwanden | Switzerland | 3:07 | 43:57.4 | +8:08.6 |
| 57 | 51 | Anthony Evans | Australia | 2:49 | 44:02.9 | +8:14.1 |
| 58 | 71 | Martin Petrásek | Czech Republic | 3:50 | 44:03.8 | +8:15.0 |
| 59 | 73 | Elemer Tanko | Romania | 4:10 | 44:27.1 | +8:38.3 |
| 60 | 69 | Slavtscho Batinkov | Bulgaria | 3:42 | 44:27.5 | +8:38.7 |
| 61 | 64 | Ebbe Hartz | Denmark | 3:16 | 44:32.8 | +8:44.0 |
| 62 | 80 | Zsolt Antal | Romania | 4:53 | 44:44.2 | +8:55.4 |
| 63 | 68 | David Belam | Great Britain | 3:40 | 44:57.8 | +9:09.0 |
| 64 | 76 | Stephan Kunz | Liechtenstein | 4:24 | 44:59.6 | +9:10.8 |
| 65 | 77 | Byung-Chul Park | South Korea | 4:27 | 45:36.3 | +9:47.5 |
| 66 | 67 | Mark Gray | Australia | 3:34 | 45:41.1 | +9:52.3 |
| 67 | 74 | Iskren Plankov | Bulgaria | 4:19 | 46:32.5 | +10:43.7 |
| 68 | 75 | Jin-Soo Ahn | South Korea | 4:22 | 46:56.1 | +11:07.3 |
| 69 | 78 | Rögnvaldur Ingþórsson | Iceland | 4:31 | 46:56.2 | +11:07.4 |
| 70 | 81 | Petar Zografov | Bulgaria | 5:29 | 47:22.2 | +11:33.4 |
| 71 | 79 | Antonio Rački | Croatia | 4:38 | 48:18.8 | +12:30.0 |
| 72 | 85 | Jānis Hermanis | Croatia | 6:37 | 50:57.5 | +15:08.7 |
| 73 | 86 | Nikos Anastassiadis | Greece | 6:40 | 51:23.9 | +15:35.1 |
| 74 | 84 | Bekim Babic | Bosnia and Herzegovina | 6:24 | 53:23.6 | +17:34.8 |
| DNF | 42 | Urmas Välbe | Estonia | 2:38 | Did not finish | |
| DNF | 82 | Nikos Kalofyris | Greece | 5:57 | Did not finish | |
| DNS | 7 | Vegard Ulvang | Norway | 0:48 | Did not start | |
| DNS | 9 | Harri Kirvesniemi | Finland | 0:53 | Did not start | |
| DNS | 23 | Jari Isometsä | Finland | 1:46 | Did not start | |
| DNS | 24 | Thomas Alsgaard | Norway | 1:47 | Did not start | |
| DNS | 27 | Torgny Mogren | Sweden | 2:01 | Did not start | |
| DNS | 28 | Viktor Kamotski | Belarus | 2:02 | Did not start | |
| DNS | 30 | Niklas Jonsson | Sweden | 2:07 | Did not start | |
| DNS | 48 | Giachem Guidon | Switzerland | 2:49 | Did not start | |
| DNS | 54 | Stéphane Azambre | France | 2:54 | Did not start | |
| DNS | 83 | Christos Titas | Greece | 6:17 | Did not start | |
| DNS | 87 | Mithat Yildrim | Turkey | 8:14 | Did not start | |
| DNS | 88 | Rusiate Rogoyawa | Fiji | 14:10 | Did not start | |
