= Cross-country skiing at the 1994 Winter Olympics – Men's 30 kilometre freestyle =

Men's 30 kilometre freestyle at the XVII Olympic Winter Games
- Venue: Birkebeineren Ski Stadium
- Dates: 14 February 1994
- Competitors: 74 from 28 nations
- Winning time: 1:12:26.4

Medalists
1st place, gold medalist(s)		Thomas Alsgaard; Norway
2nd place, silver medalist(s)		Bjørn Dæhlie; Norway
3rd place, bronze medalist(s)		Mika Myllylä; Finland

The men's 30 kilometre freestyle cross-country skiing competition at the 1994 Winter Olympics in Lillehammer, Norway, was held on 14 February at Birkebeineren Ski Stadium.

== Results ==
The results:

Rank	Bib	Name	Country	Time	Deficit
1st place, gold medalist(s)	69	Thomas Alsgaard	Norway	1:12:26.4	–
2nd place, silver medalist(s)	60	Bjørn Dæhlie	Norway	1:13:13.6	+47.2
3rd place, bronze medalist(s)	65	Mika Myllylä	Finland	1:14:14.5	+1:48.1
4	64	Mikhail Botvinov	Russia	1:14:43.3	+2:16.9
5	63	Maurilio De Zolt	Italy	1:14:55.5	+2:29.1
6	74	Jari Isometsä	Finland	1:15:12.5	+2:46.1
7	70	Silvio Fauner	Italy	1:15:27.7	+3:01.3
8	59	Egil Kristiansen	Norway	1:15:37.7	+3:11.3
9	73	Johann Mühlegg	Germany	1:15:42.8	+3:16.4
10	62	Vladimir Smirnov	Kazakhstan	1:16:01.8	+3:35.4
11	75	Jari Räsänen	Finland	1:16:10.7	+3:44.3
12	44	Henrik Forsberg	Sweden	1:16:10.8	+3:44.4
13	37	Jukka Hartonen	Finland	1:16:18.7	+3:52.3
14	68	Giorgio Vanzetta	Italy	1:16:35.2	+4:08.8
15	38	Gennadiy Lazutin	Russia	1:16:45.9	+4:19.5
16	32	Elmo Kassin	Estonia	1:17:37.7	+5:11.3
17	31	Jiří Teplý	Czech Republic	1:17:37.8	+5:11.4
18	13	Kristen Skjeldal	Norway	1:17:48.3	+5:21.9
19	43	Mitsuo Horigome	Japan	1:17:49.4	+5:23.0
20	29	Hiroyuki Imai	Japan	1:18:03.7	+5:37.3
21	49	Markus Hasler	Liechtenstein	1:18:18.7	+5:52.3
22	15	Anders Bergström	Sweden	1:18:22.2	+5:55.8
23	2	Mathias Fredriksson	Sweden	1:18:34.5	+6:08.1
24	71	Torgny Mogren	Sweden	1:18:41.3	+6:14.9
25	48	Pavel Benc	Czech Republic	1:18:49.5	+6:23.1
26	72	Igor Badamshin	Russia	1:18:49.9	+6:23.5
27	47	Viatscheslav Plaksunov	Belarus	1:18:57.7	+6:31.3
28	66	Alexey Prokourorov	Russia	1:19:15.3	+6:48.9
29	27	Jordi Ribo	Spain	1:19:33.8	+7:07.4
30	52	Juan Jesús Gutiérrez	Spain	1:19:47.3	+7:20.9
31	55	Viktor Kamotski	Belarus	1:19:47.7	+7:21.3
32	46	Cédric Vallet	France	1:19:49.7	+7:23.3
33	25	Janko Nauber	Germany	1:19:57.5	+7:31.1
34	23	Ondrej Valenta	Czech Republic	1:20:04.1	+7:37.7
35	34	Peter Schlickenrieder	Germany	1:20:08.8	+7:42.4
36	36	Luke Bodensteiner	United States	1:20:13.0	+7:46.6
37	22	Sergei Dolidovich	Belarus	1:20:36.5	+8:10.1
38	35	Daníel Jakobsson	Iceland	1:20:43.5	+8:17.1
39	42	Kazunari Sasaki	Japan	1:20:52.1	+8:25.7
40	9	Nikolay Ivanov	Kazakhstan	1:20:53.9	+8:27.5
41	58	Urmas Välbe	Estonia	1:21:02.5	+8:36.1
42	21	Andrey Nevzorov	Kazakhstan	1:21:14.5	+8:48.1
43	33	John Aalberg	United States	1:21:45.1	+9:18.7
44	57	Siniša Vukonić	Croatia	1:21:57.2	+9:30.8
45	19	Carl Swenson	United States	1:22:08.6	+9:42.2
46	40	Giachem Guidon	Switzerland	1:22:21.0	+9:54.6
47	30	Michael Binzer	Denmark	1:22:23.1	+9:56.7
48	4	Kazutoshi Nagahama	Japan	1:22:24.9	+9:58.5
49	17	Jürg Capol	Switzerland	1:22:59.9	+10:33.5
50	50	Dany Bouchard	Canada	1:23:06.9	+10:40.5
51	16	Jin-Soo Ahn	South Korea	1:23:21.4	+10:55.0
52	39	Elemer Tanko	Romania	1:23:22.6	+10:56.2
53	54	Pavel Korolev	Kazakhstan	1:23:25.3	+10:58.9
54	12	Zsolt Antal	Romania	1:23:49.7	+11:23.3
55	24	Stephan Kunz	Liechtenstein	1:24:00.0	+11:33.6
56	41	Byung-Chul Park	South Korea	1:24:16.0	+11:49.6
57	3	Vasili Gorbatchev	Belarus	1:24:17.9	+11:51.5
58	45	Slavtscho Batinkov	Bulgaria	1:24:19.4	+11:53.0
59	26	Jaak Mae	Estonia	1:24:24.1	+11:57.7
60	28	David Belam	Great Britain	1:24:28.2	+12:01.8
61	53	Mark Gray	Australia	1:24:49.9	+12:23.5
62	20	Antonio Rački	Croatia	1:25:42.4	+13:16.0
63	1	Taivo Kuus	Estonia	1:25:52.3	+13:25.9
64	10	Petar Zografov	Bulgaria	1:27:18.6	+14:52.2
65	6	Marcus Nash	United States	1:27:18.7	+14:52.3
66	18	Ebbe Hartz	Denmark	1:27:43.2	+15:16.8
67	14	Rögnvaldur Ingþórsson	Iceland	1:27:45.8	+15:19.4
68	11	Nikos Anastassiadis	Greece	1:30:54.7	+18:28.3
69	7	Jānis Hermanis	Latvia	1:34:10.5	+21:44.1
70	56	Nikos Kalofyris	Greece	1:36:30.5	+24:04.1
71	8	Christos Titas	Greece	1:36:41.5	+24:15.1
	51	Ricardas Panavas	Lithuania	DNF	
	61	Hervé Balland	France	DNF	
	67	Gianfranco Polvara	Italy	DSQ	
	5	Martin Petrásek	Czech Republic	DNS	
