= Cross-country skiing at the 1994 Winter Olympics – Men's 10 kilometre classical =

Men's 10 kilometre classical at the XVII Olympic Winter Games
- Venue: Birkebeineren Ski Stadium
- Dates: 17 February 1994
- Competitors: 88 from 33 nations
- Winning time: 24:20.1

Medalists
1st place, gold medalist(s)		Bjørn Dæhlie; Norway
2nd place, silver medalist(s)		Vladimir Smirnov; Kazakhstan
3rd place, bronze medalist(s)		Marco Albarello; Italy

The men's 10 kilometre classical cross-country skiing competition at the 1994 Winter Olympics in Lillehammer, Norway, was held on 17 February at Birkebeineren Ski Stadium in Lillehammer.

Each skier started at half-minute intervals, skiing the entire 10-kilometre course. The Norwegian Sture Sivertsen was the 1993 World champion. Men's 10 kilometre classical was not a part of the 1988 Winter Olympics in Calgary, Canada.

== Results ==
Rank	Bib	Name	Country	Time	Deficit
1st place, gold medalist(s)	71	Bjørn Dæhlie	Norway	24:20.1	—
2nd place, silver medalist(s)	86	Vladimir Smirnov	Kazakhstan	24:38.3	+18.2
3rd place, bronze medalist(s)	78	Marco Albarello	Italy	24:42.3	+22.2
4	74	Mikhail Botvinov	Russia	24:58.9	+38.8
5	68	Sture Sivertsen	Norway	24:59.7	+39.6
6	69	Mika Myllylä	Finland	25:05.3	+45.2
7	87	Vegard Ulvang	Norway	25:08.0	+47.9
8	67	Silvio Fauner	Italy	25:08.1	+48.0
9	88	Harri Kirvesniemi	Finland	25:13.2	+53.1
10	48	Alois Stadlober	Austria	25:25.4	+1:05.3
11	73	Jochen Behle	Germany	25:29.4	+1:09.3
12	76	Jari Räsänen	Finland	25:31.5	+1:11.4
13	80	Andrey Kirillov	Russia	25:41.2	+1:21.1
14	72	Jan Ottosson	Sweden	25:47.9	+1:27.8
15	82	Giorgio Vanzetta	Italy	25:48.1	+1:28.0
16	29	Nikolai Ivanov	Kazakhstan	25:48.3	+1:28.2
17	84	Johann Mühlegg	Germany	25:50.6	+1:30.5
18	64	Vladimir Legotine	Russia	25:52.6	+1:32.5
19	47	Christer Majbäck	Sweden	25:55.2	+1:35.1
20	79	Alexey Prokurorov	Russia	25:55.3	+1:35.2
21	55	Jeremias Wigger	Switzerland	25:55.4	+1:35.3
22	40	Patrick Rémy	France	25:57.6	+1:37.5
23	70	Jari Isometsä	Finland	26:06.5	+1:46.4
24	81	Thomas Alsgaard	Norway	26:07.0	+1:46.9
25	15	Kazunari Sasaki	Japan	26:12.1	+1:52.0
26	62	Luboš Buchta	Czech Republic	26:17.6	+1:57.5
27	83	Torgny Mogren	Sweden	26:21.7	+2:01.6
28	53	Viktor Kamotski	Belarus	26:22.6	+2:02.5
29	77	Fulvio Valbusa	Italy	26:26.2	+2:06.1
30	85	Niklas Jonsson	Sweden	26:27.6	+2:07.5
31	46	Mitsuo Horigome	Japan	26:36.2	+2:16.1
32	42	Torald Rein	Germany	26:38.7	+2:18.6
33	60	Elmo Kassin	Estonia	26:40.9	+2:20.8
34	58	Pavel Ryabinin	Kazakhstan	26:41.7	+2:21.6
35	3	Jaak Mae	Estonia	26:42.7	+2:22.6
36	22	Andrus Veerpalu	Estonia	26:45.8	+2:25.7
37	8	Andrey Nevzorov	Kazakhstan	26:45.9	+2:25.8
38	38	Ričardas Panavas	Lithuania	26:46.1	+2:26.0
39	24	Philippe Sanchez	France	26:47.8	+2:27.7
40	51	Hiroyuki Imai	Japan	26:48.8	+2:28.7
41	14	Todd Boonstra	United States	26:56.3	+2:36.2
42	54	Urmas Välbe	Estonia	26:58.4	+2:38.3
43	52	Ivan Bátory	Slovakia	26:58.7	+2:38.6
44	6	Carlos Vicente	Spain	27:01.4	+2:41.3
45	4	John Aalberg	United States	27:02.3	+2:42.2
46	33	Hans Diethelm	Switzerland	27:03.1	+2:43.0
47	63	Juan Gutiérrez	Spain	27:06.0	+2:45.9
48	61	Giachem Guidon	Switzerland	27:09.1	+2:49.0
49	36	Dany Bouchard	Canada	27:09.5	+2:49.4
50	56	Daníel Jakobsson	Iceland	27:09.7	+2:49.6
51	41	Anthony Evans	Australia	27:09.9	+2:49.8
52	65	Benjamin Husaby	United States	27:11.3	+2:51.2
53	59	Vyacheslav Plaksunov	Belarus	27:12.1	+2:52.0
54	50	Stéphane Azambre	France	27:14.6	+2:54.5
55	43	Markus Hasler	Liechtenstein	27:17.1	+2:57.0
56	45	Siniša Vukonić	Croatia	27:17.5	+2:57.4
57	23	Jordi Ribó	Spain	27:21.2	+3:01.1
58	49	Luke Bodensteiner	United States	27:22.3	+3:02.2
59	75	Václav Korunka	Czech Republic	27:22.8	+3:02.7
60	2	Wilhelm Aschwanden	Switzerland	27:27.2	+3:07.1
61	13	Janko Neuber	Germany	27:27.4	+3:07.3
62	1	Igor Obukhov	Belarus	27:29.2	+3:09.1
63	9	Cédric Vallet	France	27:30.0	+3:09.9
64	37	Ebbe Hartz	Denmark	27:36.0	+3:15.9
65	27	Pavel Benc	Czech Republic	27:38.6	+3:18.5
66	18	Michael Binzer	Denmark	27:43.5	+3:23.4
67	17	Mark Gray	Australia	27:54.0	+3:33.9
68	16	David Belam	Great Britain	28:00.2	+3:40.1
69	57	Slavcho Batinkov	Bulgaria	28:02.2	+3:42.1
70	31	Sergei Dolidovich	Belarus	28:02.8	+3:42.7
71	5	Martin Petrásek	Czech Republic	28:10.0	+3:49.9
72	10	Masaaki Kozu	Japan	28:20.2	+4:00.1
73	39	Elemer-Gyorgy Tanko	Romania	28:30.5	+4:10.4
74	35	Iskren Plankov	Bulgaria	28:39.0	+4:18.9
75	12	Ahn Jin-soo	South Korea	28:42.9	+4:22.8
76	32	Stephan Kunz	Liechtenstein	28:44.8	+4:24.7
77	66	Park Byung-chul	South Korea	28:47.3	+4:27.2
78	21	Rögnvaldur Ingþórsson	Iceland	28:51.2	+4:31.1
79	30	Antonio Rački	Croatia	28:58.6	+4:38.5
80	25	Zsolt Antal	Romania	29:13.3	+4:53.2
81	7	Petar Zografov	Bulgaria	29:49.4	+5:29.3
82	11	Níkos Kalofiris	Greece	30:17.0	+5:56.9
83	34	Christos Títas	Greece	30:37.0	+6:16.9
84	28	Bekim Babić	Bosnia and Herzegovina	30:44.3	+6:24.2
85	20	Jānis Hermanis	Latvia	30:57.3	+6:37.2
86	44	Nikos Anastassiadis	Greece	31:00.3	+6:40.2
87	26	Mithat Yıldırım	Turkey	32:34.8	+8:14.7
88	19	Rusiate Rogoyawa	Fiji	38:30.7	+14:10.6
