= Luge at the 1994 Winter Olympics – Women's singles =

Women's singles at the XVII Olympic Winter Games
- Venue: Lillehammer Olympic Bobsleigh and Luge Track
- Dates: 15–16 February 1994
- Competitors: 25 from 14 nations
- Winning time: 3:15.517

Medalists
1st place, gold medalist(s)		Gerda Weissensteiner	Italy
2nd place, silver medalist(s)		Susi Erdmann	Germany
3rd place, bronze medalist(s)		Andrea Tagwerker	Austria

The Women's singles luge competition at the 1994 Winter Olympics in Lillehammer was held on 15 and 16 February, at Lillehammer Olympic Bobsleigh and Luge Track.

Weissensteiner, the defending world champion, had the fastest times in each of the four runs to win the gold medal. Less than three weeks later, the medal was stolen while she was at her brother's funeral when her home in Bolzano was burgled. The Olympic Organizing Committee of Lillehammer gave her a replacement.

== Results ==
Rank	Bib	Athlete	Country	Run 1	Run 2	Run 3	Run 4	Total
1st place, gold medalist(s)	1	Gerda Weissensteiner	Italy	48.740	48.890	48.950	48.937	3:15.517
2nd place, silver medalist(s)	12	Susi Erdmann	Germany	48.989	48.893	49.340	49.054	3:16.276
3rd place, bronze medalist(s)	4	Andrea Tagwerker	Austria	48.961	49.157	49.277	49.257	3:16.652
4	3	Angelika Neuner	Austria	49.055	49.152	49.315	49.379	3:16.901
5	8	Natalie Obkircher	Italy	49.046	49.252	49.181	49.458	3:16.937
6	6	Gabi Kohlisch	Germany	48.988	49.323	49.301	49.585	3:17.197
7	5	Irina Gubkina	Russia	49.167	49.231	49.376	49.424	3:17.198
8	11	Nataliya Yakushenko	Ukraine	49.233	49.304	49.413	49.428	3:17.378
9	2	Anna Orlova	Latvia	49.301	49.526	49.297	49.363	3:17.487
10	20	Doris Neuner	Austria	49.331	49.717	49.319	49.459	3:17.826
11	7	Cammy Myler	United States	49.201	49.763	49.324	49.546	3:17.834
12	17	Bethany Calcaterra-McMahon	United States	49.733	49.542	49.304	49.426	3:18.005
13	13	Pia Wedege	Norway	49.367	49.490	49.720	49.470	3:18.047
14	19	Jana Bode	Germany	50.099	49.296	49.467	49.239	3:18.101
15	21	Mária Jasenčáková	Slovakia	49.411	50.351	49.276	49.418	3:18.456
16	14	Evija Šulce	Latvia	49.795	49.819	49.625	49.718	3:18.957
17	10	Iluta Gaile	Latvia	49.973	49.736	49.636	49.704	3:19.049
18	23	Olga Novikova	Russia	49.860	50.044	49.842	50.231	3:19.977
19	15	Helen Novikov	Estonia	50.160	50.172	49.808	50.193	3:20.333
20	16	Anne Abernathy	Virgin Islands	50.698	50.190	49.776	50.167	3:20.831
21	24	Adriana Turea	Romania	50.324	50.588	50.393	50.556	3:21.861
22	25	Sorina Grigore	Romania	51.324	50.800	50.572	50.508	3:23.204
23	18	Verona Marjanović	Bosnia and Herzegovina	50.586	51.707	51.365	51.121	3:24.779
24	22	Greta Sebald	Greece	1:43.585	50.824	49.777	49.955	4:14.141
-	9	Erin Warren	United States	DNF	-	-	-	-
