= Lost Valley Ski Area =

Ski area in Auburn, Maine

- Interactive map of Lost Valley Ski Area
- Location: 200 Lost Valley Rd. Auburn, Maine, U.S.
- Nearest city: Auburn: 3 miles (5 km)
- Coordinates: 44.136°N 70.281°W
- Status: Active
- Opened: 1981/12/08
- Vertical: 240 ft (73 m)
- Top elevation: 480 ft (146 m)
- Base elevation: 240 ft (73 m)
- Skiable area: 45 acres (18 ha)
- Trails: 31 (Including glades): 22% beginner; 38% intermediate; 28% advanced; 12% expert
- Longest run: 2,500 ft (760 m)
- Lift system: 3 double chairlifts and 1 ground lift carpet.
- Terrain parks: 3
- Snowfall: 67 inches (170 cm) to 71 inches (180 cm)
- Snowmaking: 100%, 45 acres (18 ha)
- Night skiing: Mon-Fri
- Website: https://www.lostvalleyski.com/

Lost Valley is a ski area located in Auburn, Maine, offering east-facing slopes with 22 trails and 9 gladed areas. The mountain is serviced by four lifts: three double chairlifts and a ground lift carpet for the ski and snowboard learning center.

In addition to its alpine offerings, Lost Valley is home to the Auburn Nordic Ski Association (ANSA), which operates Nordic skiing and snowshoeing trails. The area also includes two crossings of the PRST snowmobile club multi-use trail—one crossing the Pond Loop and the other crossing Perkins Ridge Road near the former Ricker Hill Farm just down the road from Wallingford's Fruit House.

The resort features a full brewpub with a bar, indoor and outdoor seating, a grab-and-go food counter, a ticket counter, a retail shop, ski and snowboard rentals, a ski and snowboard school, and a ski patrol hut near the parking lot. Coin-operated and seasonally available lockers are also provided.

== Statistics ==
- Facts
  - Year opened: 1961
  - Number of lifts: 4
  - Double chairs: 3
  - Ground lift carpet: 1
- Elevation
  - Vertical drop: 240 ft (73 m)
  - Longest run: 2,500 ft (760 m)
  - Skiable area: 45 acres (18 ha)
  - Snowmaking: 45 acres (18 ha)
- Types of downhill runs
  - Beginner: 22%
  - Intermediate: 38%
  - Advanced: 28%
  - Expert: 12%
  - Terrain Parks: 3
- Types of Nordic trails
  - 8km made of up 10 Nordic Skiing trails of various difficulties.
- Types of Snowshoeing trails
  - 20 Snowshoeing trails of various difficulties.

== Terrain ==
Most of Lost Valley's trails are rated easiest and intermediate, with a limited amount of advanced and expert terrain. Family regrouping is simple as all trails come together a short distance from each other.

== Area Lodging ==
Hilton Garden Inn - Auburn

+/- 10 minutes from Lost Valley. Room options including overlooking the Androscoggin River and Great Falls and the hotel is located in Auburn’s Downtown, near restaurants and brewpubs. It features a restaurant with breakfast, an indoor pool and other amenities.

Hampton Inn - Lewiston

+/- 12 minutes from Lost Valley. The Hampton Inn in Lewiston, which also overlooks the Androscoggin River and Great Falls, is close to nearby restaurants, brewpubs and some of the region's fine dining.

Marriot Residence Inn - Auburn

+/- 8 minutes from Lost Valley. Located near Walmart, the Marriott is the closest hotel to the mountain and has an indoor pool and proximity to shopping and dining.

== Summer use ==
In the summer months, Lost Valley changes from a ski resort into an outdoor recreational facility featuring brewpub, nanobrewery, mountain biking, horseshoes, cross country running, corn hole, and concerts.

- Julie Parisien, silver medalist in slalom at 1993 World Championships, three-time Olympian (1992, 1994, 1998).
- Rob Parisien, 1992 Olympian, slalom (20th).
- Anne-Lise Parisien, 1994 Olympian, giant slalom (13th).
- Karl Anderson, 1976 and 1980 Olympian, Alpine skiing.
- John Bower, 1964 and 1968 Olympian, Nordic skiing.
- Peter Davis, 1980 Olympics assistant coach, Nordic skiing.
- Bob Harkins, 1988 Olympics alpine operations manager, Alpine skiing.
- Robert Kendall, 1972 Olympian, Nordic combined.
