= Julie Parisien =

American alpine skier

Personal information
- Full name: Julie Madelein Josephine Parisien
- Nationality: American
- Born: August 2, 1971 (age 55) Montreal, Quebec, Canada
- Height: 5 ft 8 in (173 cm)

Skiing career
- Sport: Alpine skiing
- Club: Lost Valley Race Club
- Retired: March 1994 (age 22); October 1998 (age 27)
- Disciplines: Slalom, giant slalom, combined, Super G, Downhill
- World Cup debut: December 1990 (age 19)

Olympics
- Teams: 3 – (1992, 1994, 1998)
- Medals: 0

World Championships
- Teams: 1 – (1993)
- Medals: 1 (0 gold)

World Cup
- Seasons: 4 – (1991–1994)
- Wins: 3 – (2 SL, 1 GS)
- Podiums: 4 – (3 SL, 1 GS)
- Overall titles: 0 – (15th in 1992)
- Discipline titles: 0 – (7th in SL, 1993)
Medal record
Women's alpine skiing
Representing the United States
World Championships
Silver medal – second place	1993 Morioka	Slalom
Junior World Championships
Bronze medal – third place	1989 Alyeska	Super-G
Winter Pan American Games
Bronze medal – third place	1990 Las Leñas	Super-G

Julie Madelein Josephine Parisien (born August 2, 1971) is a former World Cup alpine ski racer from the United States. She specialized in the technical events of slalom and giant slalom. Parisien was the silver medalist in the slalom at the World Championships in 1993 and competed in three Olympics.

Born in Montreal, Quebec, Canada, Parisien's mother was born in Australia and her father, an orthopedic surgeon, in Canada. The family moved from Quebec to Maine when Julie was less than a year old. She and her three siblings were raised just outside Auburn, about a mile (1.6 km) from the Lost Valley Ski Area. On skis at age two, she followed her two older brothers and attended the Burke Mountain Academy in northeastern Vermont. Her siblings Rob (b.1970) and Anne-Lise (b.1972) also competed at the Olympics in alpine skiing. The eldest brother, Jean Paul (1968–92), captained the Williams College ski team and coached at Burke Mountain Academy. He was killed in a hit-and-run highway accident in December 1992, forced off the road by a drunk driver.

Parisien had won her third World Cup race in late November 1992 at Park City, and in the first two slalom events in January 1993 she placed fourth and sixth. She then won the silver medal in the slalom at the World Championships in Japan. But the loss of her brother affected her and she struggled in the 1994 season. After a disappointing 1994 Winter Olympics, Parisien left the U.S. Ski Team and competed on the women's pro tour in North America. She was rookie of the year in 1995 and finished second in the standings. Parisien dominated the pro tour next two years, then qualified for the 1998 Olympics, and finished 13th in the slalom at Nagano. At her first Olympics in 1992 in France, she held a slim lead after the first run in the slalom but finished fourth, missing a medal by 0.05 seconds.

After summer glacier training with the U.S. Ski Team in Europe, Parisien decided it was time to retire from competition in the fall of 1998. She was inducted into the Maine Sports Hall of Fame in 2001 and the National Ski Hall of Fame in 2006.

After finishing her career in competitive skiing, Parisien completed her degree in nursing. She graduated from the University of Southern Maine in 2003. As of 2023, Parisien resides in Kalispell, Montana where she works in gastroenterology.

== World Cup results ==
=== Season standings ===
Season	Age	Overall	Slalom	Giant Slalom	Super G	Downhill	Combined
1991	19	39	34	10	—	—	—
1992	20	15	8	16	23	—	—
1993	21	27	7	33	35	52	—
1994	22	72	26	—	—	—	—
1995	23	retired, did not compete					
1996	24	retired, did not compete					
1997	25	retired, did not compete					
1998	26	3 events, no World points (top 30)					

=== Race podiums ===
- 3 wins - (2 SL, 1 GS)
- 4 podiums - (3 SL, 1 GS); 15 top tens (9 SL, 6 GS, 1 SG)

Season	Date	Location	Discipline	Place
1991	22 Mar 1991	(United States) Waterville Valley, USA	Giant slalom	1st
1992	14 Jan 1992	Hinterstoder, Austria	Slalom	3rd
1992	2 Mar 1992	Sundsvall, Sweden	Slalom	1st
1993	29 Nov 1992	(United States) Park City, USA	Slalom	1st

== World Championship results ==
Year	Age	Slalom	Giant Slalom	Super G	Downhill	Combined
1993	21	2	17	25	—	—

== Olympic results ==
Year	Age	Slalom	Giant Slalom	Super G	Downhill	Combined
1992	20	4	5	DSQ	—	—
1994	22	DSQ2	—	—	—	DSQ DH
1998	26	13	28	—	—	—
