= Slive =

Slive is a surname. Notable people with the surname include:

- Michael Slive (1940–2018), American attorney and college sports executive
- Seymour Slive (1920–2014), American art historian
