= Greg Sankey =

College sports administrator

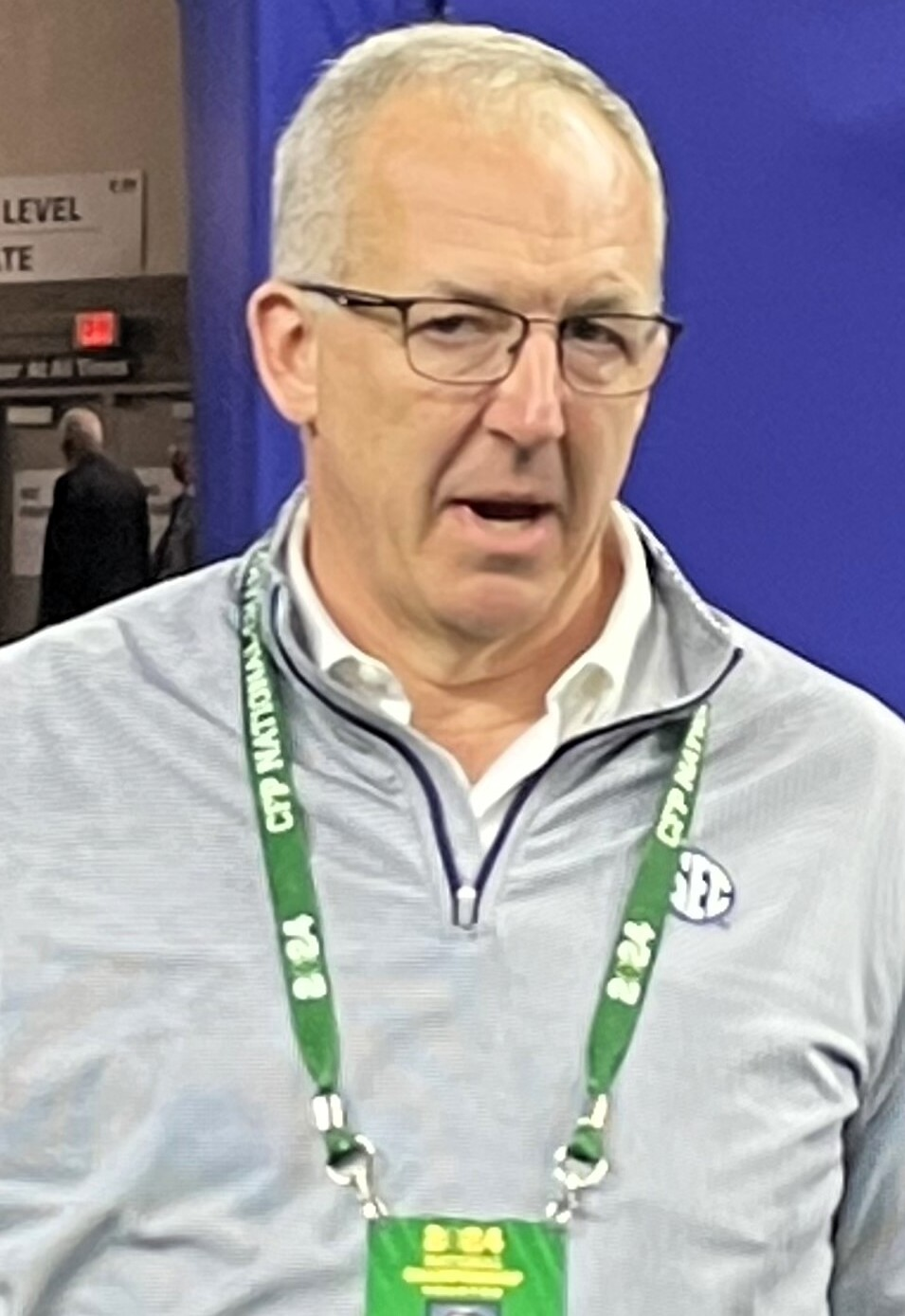
- Sankey at the 2024 College Football Playoff National Championship
- Born: August 3, 1964 (age 62); Auburn, New York, U.S.
- Education: Cayuga Community College; State University of New York at Cortland (BS); Syracuse University (M.Ed.)
- Occupation: Commissioner
- Years active: 2015–present
- Employer: Southeastern Conference

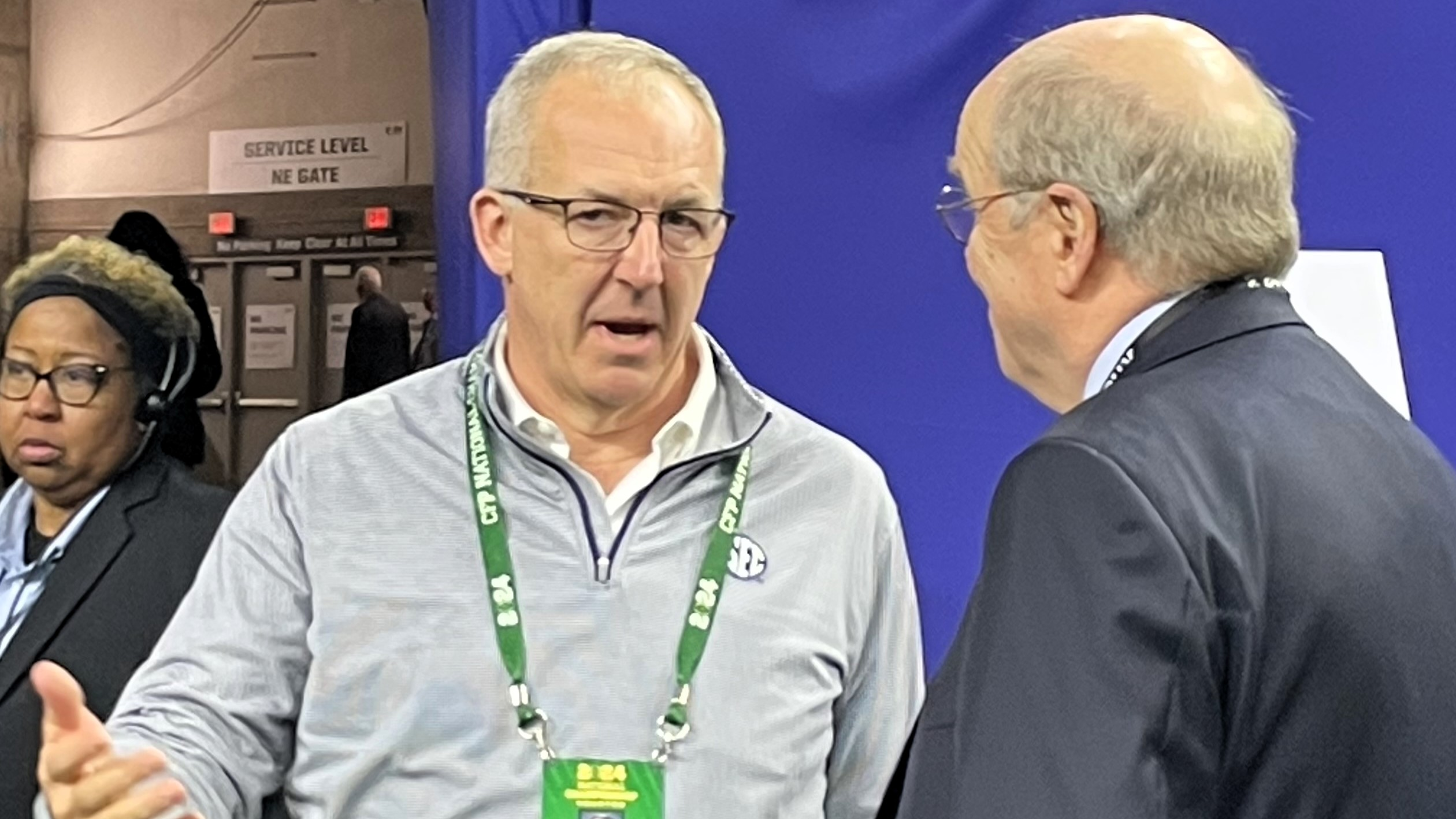
Sankey talking with Bill Hancock, Executive Director of the College Football Playoff, on the sideline of the CFP title game.

Greg Sankey (born August 3, 1964) is an American athletics administrator who has served as the commissioner of the Southeastern Conference (SEC) since 2015. He was previously employed by the SEC for 13 years in various capacities under commissioner Mike Slive. Prior to that, he was the commissioner of the Southland Conference. Sankey's high profile role has led media outlets to dub him "the most powerful man in college athletics".

== Early life and education ==
Sankey was born and raised in Auburn, New York.

Sankey started college as an engineering major and baseball player at LeTourneau College in Longview, Texas but soon returned to New York. He earned his associate's degree from Cayuga Community College and an undergraduate degree in education from the State University of New York at Cortland in 1987. While working as the director of intramural sports at Utica College, he earned his master's degree in education from Syracuse University's School of Education in 1993.

== Career ==
Sankey began his career as the director of intramural sports at Utica College. After completing a one-year internship in the athletic department of Northwestern State University in Natchitoches, Louisiana, Sankey was hired as the compliance director there. He also coached the university’s golf teams for two years and worked there until 1992.

Sankey joined the Southland Conference in 1992, continuing work on compliance issues, ultimately becoming commissioner in 1996.

In 2002, when the SEC was having compliance issues, then-commissioner Mike Slive hired Sankey as an associate commissioner. When Slive retired in 2015, Sankey was named the league's eighth commissioner. During his tenure as commissioner, the SEC has expanded, adding Texas and Oklahoma to the conference in July 2021.

Sankey is co-chair of the NCAA transformation committee. Sankey in March 2024 raised controversy by suggesting the NCAA men's basketball postseason tournament get rid of automatic berths, thus limiting tournament appearance and financial windfall opportunities for smaller programs and conferences.

In January 2025, Sankey proposed making changes to the format of the College Football Playoff in the 2025 season.

== Personal life ==
Sankey married his wife Cathy in November 1988 in New York. They reside in Birmingham, Alabama, and have two adult daughters, one of whom went to an SEC school at Mississippi State University. Sankey is an avid marathoner and has run 41 marathons. He is a Christian.
