= Fiji at the 2002 Winter Olympics =

- IOC code: FIJ
- NOC: Fiji Association of Sports and National Olympic Committee
- Website: www.fasanoc.org.fj

in Salt Lake City
- Competitors: 1 in 1 sport
- Flag bearer: Laurence Thoms
- Medals: Gold 0 Silver 0 Bronze 0 Total 0

Winter Olympics appearances (overview)
- 1988; 1992; 1994; 1998; 2002; 2006–2022; 2026

Fiji sent a delegation to compete at the 2002 Winter Olympics, in Salt Lake City, Utah, United States from February 8–24, 2002. This was the nation's third appearance at a Winter Olympic Games. The delegation consisted of a single athlete, alpine skier Laurence Thoms. He competed in both the slalom, where he failed to complete his first run, and in the giant slalom, in which he finished 55th out of the 57 skiers who completed both of their runs. Thoms gained media attention for representing a tropical nation at the Winter Olympics.

== Background ==
Fiji first entered the Olympic competition at the 1956 Summer Olympics in Melbourne, Australia. The nation did not enter a Winter Olympic Games until Calgary in 1988. Fiji also participated in the 1994 Winter Olympics, making the Salt Lake City Games the nation's third Winter Olympics appearance. The 2002 Fijian delegation consisted of a single alpine skier, Laurence Thoms. He was also the Fijian flagbearer for both the opening and closing ceremonies. As of June 2018, this was the most recent time Fiji has participated in a Winter Games.

At a New Year's Eve party in 1998, a group of Fijians had discussed how it would be nice to have a Fijian skier in the Olympics. After the party, they placed a newspaper advertisement asking young Fijians to apply to a ski team to which Thoms responded. Thoms qualified under the FIS's small-country rules, and he attracted media attention for being a competitor from a tropical nation at the Winter Olympics. Toni Hauswirth, a Swiss businessman who retired to Fiji, fully funded the project to get a skier to Salt Lake City.

== Alpine skiing ==
Fiji qualified one athlete for alpine skiing. Laurence Thoms was 21 at the time of the Salt Lake City Olympics. Thoms's first ever race was in January 2000, two years before the Salt Lake City games. He competed in both the slalom and giant slalom. The giant slalom was held on February 21 at Deer Valley while the slalom was held on February 23 at the Park City Mountain Resort.

Thoms failed to complete the slalom, but completed the giant slalom and finished in 55th place overall with a combined time of 2:41.98. He placed at 68th and 55th in the 1st and 2nd runs, respectively. Thoms's performance in the giant slalom still stands as the best Fijian performance at any Winter Olympics.

=== Men ===
Athlete	Event	Run 1		Run 2		Final/total		
Athlete	Event	Time	Rank	Time	Rank	Time	Diff	Rank
Laurence Thoms	Giant slalom	1:22.01	68	1:19.97	55	2:41.98	+18.70	55
Laurence Thoms	Slalom	Did not finish				Did not finish		
