= Todd Boonstra =

American cross-country skier (born 1961)

Personal information
- Nationality: United States
- Born: May 29, 1961 (age 65) Minneapolis, Minnesota United States

Sport
- Sport: Skiing

World Cup career
- Seasons: 8 – (1984, 1988–1990, 1992–1995)
- Indiv. starts: 28
- Indiv. podiums: 0
- Team starts: 3
- Team podiums: 0
- Overall titles: 0 – (51st in 1990)

Todd Boonstra (born May 29, 1961) is a former American cross-country skier. He competed in the Olympics in 1984, 1988, 1994. Boonstra is a 1984 graduate of the University of Vermont, where he competed for the Vermont Catamounts team. He is also a marathon runner, and in 2003 became the oldest champion of the Mount Marathon Race at 41. Boonstra graduated from Burnsville High School in Burnsville, Minnesota in 1980. He currently resides in Alaska, living in Ninilchik in the summers and Galena in the winter, where he is a teacher and ski coach.

== Cross-country skiing results ==
All results are sourced from the International Ski Federation (FIS).

=== Olympic Games ===
Year	Age	10 km	15 km	Pursuit	30 km	50 km	4 × 10 km relay
1984	22	—N/a	54	—N/a	—	—	—
1988	26	—N/a	53	—N/a	—	—	13
1994	32	41	—N/a	41	—	39	13

=== World Championships ===
Year	Age	10 km	15 km classical	15 km freestyle	Pursuit	30 km	50 km	4 × 10 km relay
1987	25	—N/a	—	—N/a	—N/a	—	—	14
1989	27	—N/a	41	—	—N/a	38	31	13
1991	29	64	—N/a	63	—N/a	33	50	—
1993	31	40	—N/a	—N/a	36	43	—	12
1995	33	36	—N/a	—N/a	20	56	25	14

=== World Cup ===
==== Season standings ====
Season	Age	Overall
1984	22	62
1988	26	NC
1989	27	NC
1990	28	51
1992	30	NC
1993	31	NC
1994	32	74
1995	33	62
