= Olga Novikova =

Olga Novikova may refer to:

- Olga Novikova (orienteer)
- Olga Novikova (footballer) (born 1977)
- Olga Novikova (luger) (born 1973)
