= Turea (surname) =

Turea is a surname of Eastern European origin. Notable people with the surname include:

- Adriana Turea (born 1975), Romanian luger
- Andrei Turea (born 1998), Romanian luger
