= Ondřej Valenta =

Czech cross-country skier

Personal information
- Nationality: Czech
- Born: 27 January 1973 (age 52); Ústí nad Orlicí, Czechoslovakia

Sport
- Sport: Cross-country skiing

Ondřej Valenta (born 27 January 1973) is a Czech cross-country skier. He competed in the men's 30 kilometre freestyle event at the 1994 Winter Olympics.
