= Fiji at the 1994 Winter Olympics =

- IOC code: FIJ
- NOC: Fiji Association of Sports and National Olympic Committee
- Website: www.fasanoc.org.fj

in Lillehammer
- Competitors: 1 (man) in 1 sport
- Flag bearer: Rusiate Rogoyawa
- Medals: Gold 0 Silver 0 Bronze 0 Total 0

Winter Olympics appearances (overview)
- 1988; 1992; 1994; 1998; 2002; 2006–2026

Fiji sent a delegation to compete at the 1994 Winter Olympics in Lillehammer, Norway from 12–27 February 1994. This was Fiji's second time appearing at a Winter Olympic Games after their debut in the 1988 Winter Olympics. The country's sole representative was Rusiate Rogoyawa, in cross-country skiing. In the 10 kilometer classical he finished in 88th place.

== Background ==
The Fiji Association of Sports and National Olympic Committee was recognized by the International Olympic Committee on 31 December 1954. They made their first Olympic appearance at the 1956 Summer Olympics, and with two exceptions, have appeared at every Summer Olympic Games since; they missed the 1964 edition, and boycotted the 1980 Games. Fiji had appeared at the Winter Olympics only once before, in the 1988 Winter Olympics. The country's sole representative to Lillehammer was Rusiate Rogoyawa, a cross-country skier. He was the flag bearer for the opening ceremony.

== Competitors ==
The following is the list of number of competitors in the Games.

Sport	Men	Women	Total
Cross-country skiing	1	0	1
Total	1	0	1

== Cross-country skiing ==
Rusiate Rogoyawa was 32 years old at the time of the Lillehammer Olympics, and was living in Norway. He had previously represented Fiji at the 1988 Winter Olympics. On 17 February he competed in the 10 kilometer classical, finishing in a time of 38 minutes and 30.7 seconds, which put him 88th and last among the finishers of the race. The gold medal was won by Bjørn Dæhlie of Norway in a time of 24 minutes and 20.1 seconds.

Athlete	Event	Final	
Athlete	Event	Total	Rank
Rusiate Rogoyawa	10 km classical	38:30.7	88
