= Vasily Gorbachyov =

Belarusian cross-country skier (born 1965)

Personal information
- Nationality: Belarusian
- Born: 9 February 1965 (age 61) Vitebsk, Byelorussian SSR, Soviet Union

Sport
- Sport: Cross-country skiing

Vasily Gorbachyov, also transcribed as Vasily Gorbachov and Vasili Gorbatchev, (Belarusian: Васіль Фёдаравіч Горбачёу, romanized: Vasil' Fyodaravich Gorbachyou, Russian: Василий Фёдорович Горбачёв, romanized: Vasily Fyodorovich Gorbachev; born 9 February 1965 in Vitebsk) is a former Belarusian cross-country skier. He competed in the men's 30 kilometre freestyle event at the 1994 Winter Olympics.
