= Fiji at the 1988 Winter Olympics =

- IOC code: FIJ
- NOC: Fiji Association of Sports and National Olympic Committee
- Website: www.fasanoc.org.fj

in Calgary
- Competitors: 1 in 1 sport
- Flag bearer: Rusiate Rogoyawa
- Medals: Gold 0 Silver 0 Bronze 0 Total 0

Winter Olympics appearances (overview)
- 1988; 1992; 1994; 1998; 2002; 2006–2026

Fiji sent a delegation to compete in the 1988 Winter Olympics in Calgary, Alberta, Canada from 13–28 February 1988. This was their debut appearance at a Winter Olympic Games. The sole athlete sent by Fiji to Calgary was Rusiate Rogoyawa, in cross-country skiing. In the 15 kilometre classical race, he finished in 83rd place.

== Background ==
The Fiji Association of Sports and National Olympic Committee was recognised by the International Olympic Committee on 31 December 1954. They made their first Olympic appearance at the 1956 Summer Olympics, and with two exceptions, have participated at every Summer Olympic Games since; they missed the 1964 edition, and boycotted the 1980 Games. They were making their debut Winter Olympics appearance in Calgary. The only athlete sent by Fiji to Calgary was Rusiate Rogoyawa, a cross-country skier. He was the flag bearer for the opening ceremony.

== Competitors ==
The following is the list of number of competitors in the Games.

Sport	Men	Women	Total
Cross-country skiing	1	0	1
Total	1	0	1

== Cross-country skiing ==
Rusiate Rogoyawa was 26 years old at the time of the Calgary Olympics. A Fijian native, he learned to ski while studying engineering in Norway. On 19 February, he skied in the 15 kilometre classical event, and finished with a time of 1 hour, 1 minute and 26.3 seconds. This put him in 83rd place out of 85 athletes who finished the race, and 20 minutes behind the gold medal time set by Mikhail Devyatyarov of the Soviet Union.

Event	Athlete	Race	
Event	Athlete	Time	Rank
15 km classical	Rusiate Rogoyawa	1'01:26.3	83

== See also ==
- Fiji at the 1988 Summer Olympics
