= Pavel Korolyov =

Kazakhstani cross-country skier (born 1968)

Personal information
- Nationality: Kazakhstani
- Born: 21 March 1968 (age 58)

Sport
- Sport: Cross-country skiing

Pavel Korolyov (Павел Владимирович Королев, born 21 March 1968) is a Kazakhstani cross-country skier. He competed in the men's 30 kilometre freestyle event at the 1994 Winter Olympics.
