= Sorina Grigore =

Romanian luger

Personal information
- Nationality: Romanian
- Born: 5 December 1973 (age 51); Bucharest, Romania

Sport
- Sport: Luge

Sorina Grigore (born 5 December 1973) is a Romanian luger. She competed in the women's singles event at the 1994 Winter Olympics.
