= Greta Sebald =

Greek luger

Personal information
- Nationality: Greek
- Born: 18 November 1965 (age 59)

Sport
- Sport: Luge

Greta Sebald (born 18 November 1965) is a Greek luger. She competed in the women's singles event at the 1994 Winter Olympics.
