= Dave Jareckie =

American biathlete (born 1967)

Personal information
- Nationality: American
- Born: July 25, 1967 (age 57); Mexico City, Mexico

Sport
- Sport: Biathlon

Dave Jareckie (born July 25, 1967) is an American biathlete. He competed in the men's sprint event at the 1994 Winter Olympics.
