= Chantal Bailey =

American speed skater

Personal information
- Born: May 28, 1965 (age 61) Champaign, Illinois
- Website: www.bemidjispeedskating.org

Sport
- Country: United States
- Sport: Speed skating
- Turned pro: 1990
- Retired: 1998

Chantal Bailey (-Cermak, née Dunn) (born May 28, 1965) was a member of the 1994 US Olympic Team for speed skating. Currently she is coach for the Bemidji, Minnesota Pioneer Speedskating Club .

== Biography ==
Chantal was born May 28, 1965 and grew up in Champaign, Illinois, the same hometown of her 1994 Olympic teammate Bonnie Blair, who wrote in Chantal's freshman yearbook, "I really think you should be a speed skater." As a child and a teenager Chantal was a figure skater before turning over to speed skating. At the age of 14 she was diagnosed as bulimic. After graduating from Champaign Centennial High School, she moved to the Boulder, Colorado area to get a degree in sports medicine technology. While waiting tables, she wanted to exercise, so she purchased a $6 pair of speedskates from a Boulder garage sale and begun speedskating. In 1990 she made the US National Speedskating Team and four years later made the US Olympic Team.

== Speedskating ==
Chantal began speedskating in 1986 and in 1990 made the US National team. She was crowned the 1992-93 all-around U.S. women’s speed skating champion and 1994 national champion in the 3,000-meter race. She made the 1994 Olympic team and won the 1995 age-class national championships for speedskating. Chantal retired from competitive speedskating in 1998.

=== Personal records ===
Distance	Result	Location	Date
500 m	41.02	Unknown	1998
1,000 m	1:20.90	Unknown	1998
1,500 m	2:06.19	Unknown	1998
3,000 m	4:30.84	Unknown	1993
5,000 m	7:49.74	Unknown	1993

=== Olympic Results ===
Distance	Result	Location	Date
1,000 m	1:23.52	Vikingskipet	February 23, 1994
1,500 m	2:09.68	Vikingskipet	February 21, 1994
3,000 m	4:34.64	Vikingskipet	February 17, 1994

== Pioneer Speeedskating Club of Bemidji ==
In the winter of 2005-2006 Chantal started the Pioneer Skating Club in Bemidji, Minnesota. Her club has hosted to the 2008, 2009, and 2010 National Long Track Marathon.
