= Laurence Thoms =

Fijian alpine skier (born 1980)

Personal information
- Birth name: Laurence Thoms
- Born: March 26, 1980 (age 45); Suva, Dominion of Fiji
- Height: 5 ft 10 in (178 cm)

Sport
- Country: Fiji
- Sport: Alpine skiing

Laurence Thoms (born March 26, 1980) is a Fijian alpine skier who was born in Suva. He represented Fiji at the 2002 Winter Olympics in Salt Lake City, and attracted media attention as a competitor from a tropical nation at the Winter Olympics.

Thoms was Fiji's flag-bearer during the Opening Ceremony, being his country's representative, and was the first Pacific Islander to qualify through FIS regulations for the Winter Games He competed in the Slalom and Giant Slalom events. He failed to complete his first run in the Slalom event after 'clipping' a gate, but completed the Giant Slalom and finished fifty-fifth with a time of 2:41.98. Spectators reportedly cheered as they admired the 'Fiji's ice man' competitive speed in the events, and "went crazy when he crossed the finish line". One newspaper described Thoms' participation as exemplifying "the true spirit of the Games".

Before taking part in the Olympics, Thoms had worked as a white water rafting guide and ski instructor in New Zealand. His participation in the Olympics was funded by a retired Swiss businessman, Toni Hauswirth, living in Fiji, who had founded the Fiji Alpine Ski Association. Hauswirth had taken an advertisement in a Fijian newspaper in 1999 with an offer of all-expenses paid trip to the Olympics.

== See also ==
- Rusiate Rogoyawa, the only other Winter Olympian from Fiji
