= Alpha Theta =

Gender inclusive fraternity at Dartmouth College

- ΑΘ
- Founded: 1920; 106 years ago Dartmouth College
- Type: Social
- Affiliation: Independent
- Status: Active
- Scope: Local
- Pillars: Unity, Loyalty, Scholarship, Integrity, and Siblinghood
- Colors: Red and White
- Chapters: 1
- Headquarters: 33 N. Main Street; Hanover, New Hampshire 03755; United States; 43.70710°N 72.28884°W
- Website: atheta.host.dartmouth.edu

Alpha Theta (ΑΘ) is a gender-inclusive fraternity at Dartmouth College in Hanover, New Hampshire, United States. It was established as a local fraternity in 1920 and was a chapter of Theta Chi from 1928 to 1952. It is a non-profit corporation.

== History ==
=== Iota Sigma Upsilon ===
Seven students at Dartmouth College formed a local fraternity named Iota Sigma Upsilon on March 3, 1920. Its founders were Robert L. Farwell, James W. Frost, Howard A. Hitchcock, Robert L. Loeb, Robert J. Minor, Burdette E. Weymouth, and Ralph K. Whitney. Loeb was its first president.

=== Theta Chi ===
In 1921, Iota Sigma Upsilon received a charter as the Alpha Theta chapter of Theta Chi. John Sloan Dickey, later president of the college, joined the fraternity in 1928 and was elected house president only two weeks later, while still a pledge.

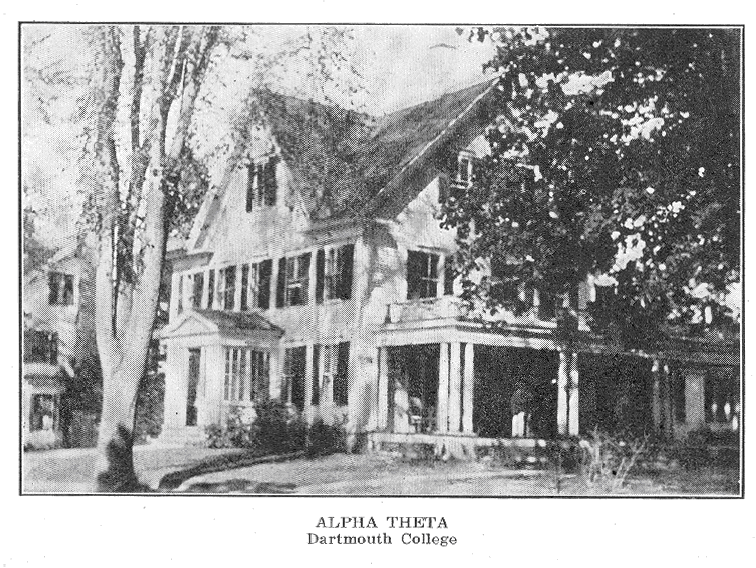
Alpha Theta's original building

Alpha Theta chapter was one of the first collegiate fraternities in the United States to break from its national organization over civil rights issues, and the first at the Greek-dominated Dartmouth College. In 1951, while Dickey served as president of the college, the student body passed a resolution calling on all fraternities to eliminate racial discrimination from their constitutions. The Theta Chi national constitution contained a clause limiting membership in the fraternity to "Caucasians" only.

On April 24, 1952, the members of the Dartmouth chapter voted unanimously to stop recognizing the racial clause in Theta Chi's constitution. After learning that the Dartmouth delegation to Theta Chi's national convention later that year planned to raise questions about the clause, the Alpha Theta chapter was derecognized by the national organization on July 25, 1952.

=== Alpha Theta ===
The Alpha Theta chapter reincorporated as a local fraternity and adopted the name Alpha Theta.

Alpha Theta was one of the first all-male fraternities to admit female members. In 1972, Dartmouth admitted the first class of female students and officially became a coeducational institution. Alpha Theta also voted to become coeducational. After a few years, most of the women in the fraternity had become inactive, and the house voted to become male-only again on November 10, 1976. The house returned to a coeducational membership policy in 1980.

== Symbols ==
The fraternity's colors are red and white. Alpha Theta ideals or pillars are Unity, Loyalty, Scholarship, Integrity, and Siblinghood.

== Chapter house ==
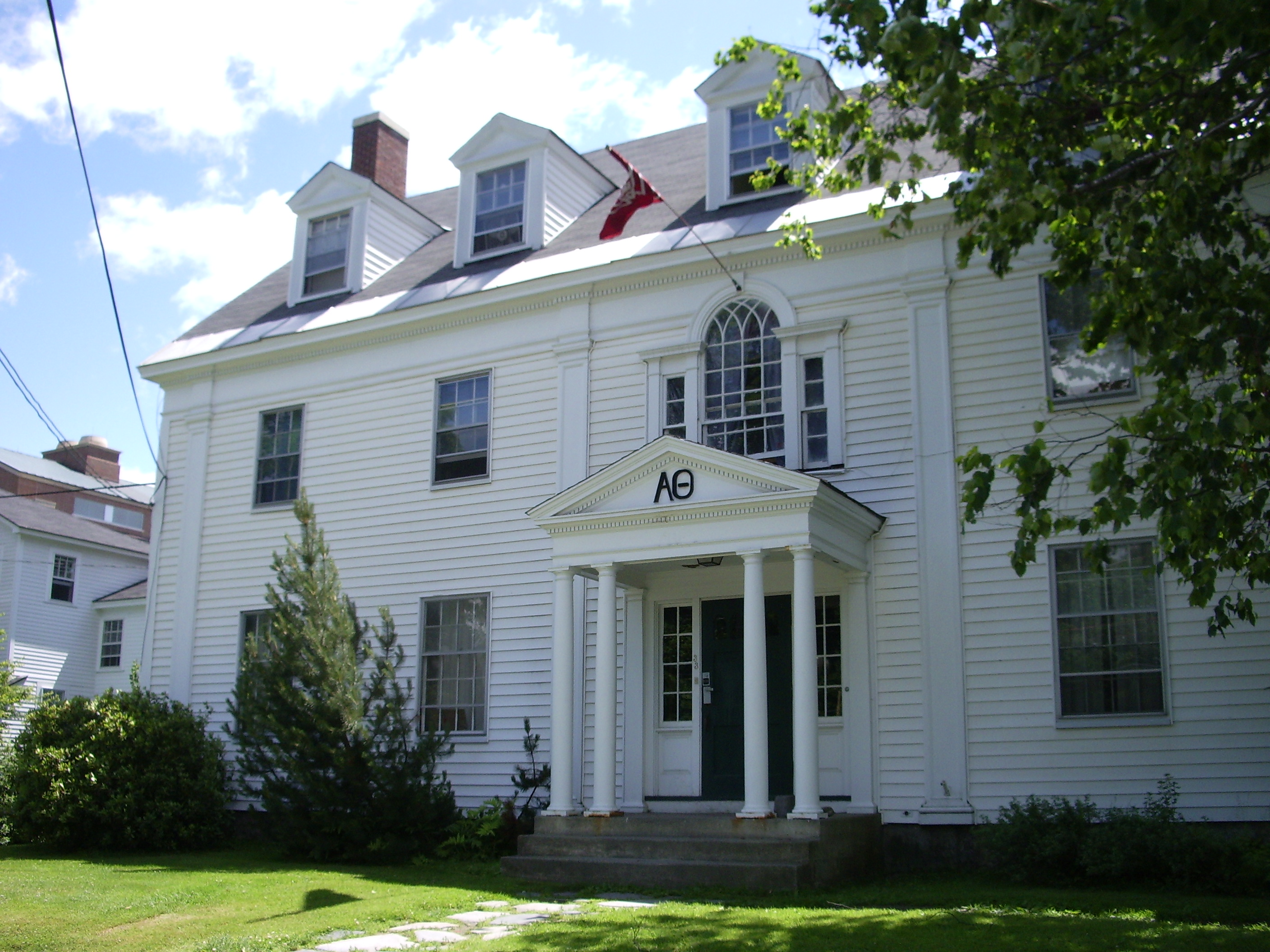
Alpha Theta chapter house, 2007

The current building and property, called Appalachia, is owned by the Alpha Theta House Corporation, a New Hampshire nonprofit corporation.

The original physical plant used by Theta Chi fraternity was built in 1852 and was used as a candy shop by confectioner E. K. Smith. Of Smith's confectionery operation, only the building housing his candy factory to the north of Alpha Theta still survives (now the Native Americans at Dartmouth house). Subsequent owners used the candy shop as a dwelling, and Theta Chi fraternity eventually bought it from J. V. Hazen in 1921.

After the tragic fire of 1934, membership suffered, and it was decided to build a new chapter house. The former house was demolished, and the current building was constructed in 1940. The only part of the original building that remains is part of the basement that leads to the back stair and contains the laundry room, called Appalachia.

Appalachia gets its name from its proximity to the Appalachian Trail. Hikers from the trail used to be able to stop in the house, an activity that is no longer possible. House tradition still has it that ghosts walk this part of Alpha Theta, and in 2007, a ghost-hunter attempted to gain access to this part of the house. Believing it would be disrespectful to the spirits, Alpha Theta refused access, though they did allow a student to take a look.

In 2008, the Alpha Theta House Corporation did an extensive two-year renovation of the house to improve the safety features of the building and the quality of life for members.

== Notable members ==
- John Sloan Dickey – class of 1929, president of Dartmouth College from 1945 to 1970
- Owen Chamberlain – class of 1941, Nobel Prize winners (Physics 1959), participated in the Manhattan Project
- Ira Michael Heyman – class of 1951, chancellor of University of California-Berkeley, 1980–1990
- Mark Mitchell – class of 1956, architect and member of the Vermont House of Representatives from 2006 to 2011
- Cameron Myler – class of 1992, member of four US Olympic luge teams, seven-time US national champion, and winner of eleven World Cup medals.

== Scandals and misconduct ==
=== Coal furnace accident ===
Nine brothers of Alpha Theta chapter of Theta Chi died in a tragic accident on the morning of Sunday, February 25, 1934, when the metal chimney of the building's old coal furnace blew out in the night and the residence filled with poisonous carbon monoxide gas. The bodies were not discovered until the afternoon of the same day, when M. B. Little, a janitor, entered the chapter house and found the students dead in their beds. A pet collie was also found dead in one of the bedrooms. This is still the most fatal accident ever to occur at Dartmouth College.

At the time, the chapter had 35 to 40 members, and seventeen lived in the chapter house. Eight residents escaped death because they had left campus for the weekend. The deceased were Americo S. De Masi (vice president), William F. Fullerton, John J. Griffin, Alfred H. Moldenke, Edward F. Moldenke (president), Wilmot H. Schooley, William M. Smith Jr., Harold D. Watson, and Edward N. Wentworth Jr.

Following the tragedy, people asked if the members would move out of the house, but faculty advisor Professor William H. Woods said, "Of course they will move back, we have men with blood in them." The surviving members met at the Hanover Inn shortly after the disaster. John Trickey Jr., past president of the chapter and a student at the Tuck School of Business, was elected to replace Moldenke. The surviving members moved back into the house after the furnace that caused the accident was replaced. However, the fraternity's membership declined after 1934. The chapter house was razed in 1940, and a new building, the current chapter house, opened in 1941.

=== Embezzlement ===
In February 2011, the Alpha Theta House Corporation filed suit against a former treasurer, Bruce McAllister, alleging that he stole hundreds of thousands of dollars from the fraternity. McAllister was also sued by the Meccawe Club, a private fishing club in Vermont, and became the target of a federal investigation later that year. In November 2011 McAllister, a former financial auditor at Dartmouth College, was indicted for wire fraud following an investigation by the United States Secret Service. McAllister was sentenced on November 26, 2012, in United States District Court in Burlington, Vermont, to eighteen months of imprisonment following his guilty plea to wire fraud. U.S. District Judge William K. Sessions III also ordered that McAllister serve three years of supervised release after he completes his prison term and pay slightly more than $800,000 in restitution to Alpha Theta and the Meccawe Club. McAllister was ordered to surrender to the Bureau of Prisons on January 8, 2013, to begin serving his sentence. McAllister's sentence was reduced due to a medical condition, which included bladder cancer, chronic obstructive pulmonary disease, and kidney blockage. The court recommended that McAllister be confined at the Bureau of Prison's medical facility in Massachusetts.

== See also ==
- Dartmouth College Greek organizations
- List of social fraternities
