= Beth Coats =

American biathlete

Personal information
- Full name: Beth Jan Coats
- Nationality: American
- Born: July 20, 1966 (age 58); Albuquerque, New Mexico, United States

Sport
- Sport: Biathlon

Beth Jan Coats (born July 20, 1966) is an American former biathlete and cyclist. She competed at the 1992 Winter Olympics and the 1994 Winter Olympics. Coats was born in Albuquerque, New Mexico and graduated from Eldorado High School. She later suffered severe injuries in a climbing accident.

== Biography ==
In the 1980s, Coats went on a skiing trip in New Mexico, which resulted in her enrolling at Western State College and joining the cross-country ski team. After learning how to use a .22 caliber rifle, Coats moved on to biathlon. In 1993, Coats joined the National Guard, helping her to qualify to the United States Olympic team.

Coats competed at two Winter Olympics, and in seven World Championships in biathlon. Coats also competed professionally in mountain biking, ranking tenth in the world as a professional, finishing second overall in the US national championships in 1997, and later became a mountain climber. However, while climbing in Eldorado Canyon State Park in 1998, Coats suffered a spinal cord injury during a fall, leaving her paralyzed from the waist down. Despite suffering a spinal injury, Coats went on to climb El Capitan in Yosemite National Park.
