= Laura Tavares =

American biathlete (born 1965)

Personal information
- Born: December 12, 1965 (age 59); Newark, New York, United States

Sport
- Sport: Biathlon

Laura Tavares (born December 12, 1965) is an American biathlete. She competed in two events at the 1994 Winter Olympics.
