= John Lilley (ice hockey) =

American ice hockey player (born 1972)

- Born: August 3, 1972 (age 53) Wakefield, Massachusetts, U.S.
- Height: 5 ft 9 in (175 cm)
- Weight: 175 lb (79 kg; 12 st 7 lb)
- Position: Right wing
- Shot: Right
- Played for: Mighty Ducks of Anaheim
- National team: United States
- NHL draft: 140th overall, 1990; Winnipeg Jets
- Playing career: 1993–2002

John E. Lilley (born August 3, 1972) is an American retired professional ice hockey player.

== Early life and education ==
Lilley was born in Wakefield, Massachusetts. After graduating from Cushing Academy, where he set a new scoring record, he played college hockey for Boston University.

== Career ==
Drafted 140th overall by the Winnipeg Jets in the 1990 NHL entry draft, Lilley went on to play 23 games in the National Hockey League for the Mighty Ducks of Anaheim, scoring three goals and eight assists for 11 points and collecting 13 penalty minutes. He spent 3 seasons in Germany's Deutsche Eishockey Liga playing for Düsseldorfer EG, the Kassel Huskies and the Schwenninger Wild Wings. Lilley was on the American national team at the 1994 Winter Olympics in Lillehammer, Norway and played in the 1994 World Championship. He ended his career with the Long Beach Ice Dogs. In August 2021, he was announced as the Director of Player Personnel & Director of Amateur Scouting for the New York Rangers.

== Career statistics ==
=== Regular season and playoffs ===
			Regular season					Playoffs
Season	Team	League	GP	G	A	Pts	PIM	GP	G	A	Pts	PIM
1989–90	Cushing Academy	HS-Prep	20	22	30	52	—	—	—	—	—	—
1990–91	Cushing Academy	HS-Prep	25	29	42	71	—	—	—	—	—	—
1991–92	Boston University	HE	23	9	9	18	43	—	—	—	—	—
1992–93	Boston University	HE	4	0	1	1	13	—	—	—	—	—
1992–93	Seattle Thunderbirds	WHL	45	22	28	50	55	5	1	3	4	9
1993–94	United States	Intl	58	27	23	50	117	—	—	—	—	—
1993–94	Mighty Ducks of Anaheim	NHL	13	1	6	7	8	—	—	—	—	—
1993–94	San Diego Gulls	IHL	2	2	1	3	0	—	—	—	—	—
1994–95	San Diego Gulls	IHL	45	9	15	24	71	2	0	0	0	2
1994–95	Mighty Ducks of Anaheim	NHL	9	2	2	4	5	—	—	—	—	—
1995–96	Mighty Ducks of Anaheim	NHL	1	0	0	0	0	—	—	—	—	—
1995–96	Baltimore Bandits	AHL	12	2	4	6	34	—	—	—	—	—
1995–96	Los Angeles Ice Dogs	IHL	64	12	20	32	112	—	—	—	—	—
1996–97	Rochester Americans	AHL	1	0	2	2	15	—	—	—	—	—
1996–97	Providence Bruins	AHL	63	12	23	35	130	10	3	0	3	24
1996–97	Detroit Vipers	IHL	1	0	0	0	2	—	—	—	—	—
1997–98	Düsseldorfer EG	DEL	44	9	14	23	120	3	0	0	0	4
1998–99	Kassel Huskies	DEL	18	1	3	4	22	—	—	—	—	—
1998–99	Schwenninger Wild Wings	DEL	8	2	1	3	16	—	—	—	—	—
1999–2000	Schwenninger Wild Wings	DEL	48	8	6	14	172	11	0	8	8	10
2000–01	Long Beach Ice Dogs	WCHL	62	28	32	60	149	8	0	4	4	43
2001–02	Long Beach Ice Dogs	WCHL	51	14	25	39	163	5	2	0	2	6
NHL totals			23	3	8	11	13	—	—	—	—	—
IHL totals			112	23	36	59	185	2	0	0	0	2
DEL totals			118	20	24	44	330	14	0	8	8	14

=== International ===
Year	Team	Event	GP	G	A	Pts	PIM
1992	United States	WJC	7	3	4	7	10
1994	United States	OG	8	3	1	4	16
1994	United States	WC	8	1	0	1	29
1999	United States	WC Q	3	0	0	0	27
Junior totals			7	3	4	7	10
Senior totals			19	4	1	5	72

== Awards and honors ==
Award	Year
All-Hockey East Rookie Team	1991–92
