= Adriana Turea =

Romanian luger

Personal information
- Nationality: Romanian
- Born: 20 April 1975 (age 49); Sinaia, Romania

Sport
- Sport: Luge

Adriana Turea (born 20 April 1975) is a Romanian luger. She competed in the women's singles event at the 1994 Winter Olympics.
