= Cikobia-i-Lau =

Island of Fiji

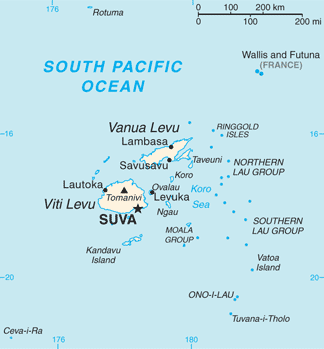

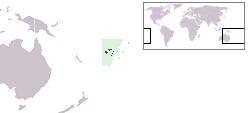

- Location within Fiji

Geography
- Location: South Pacific Ocean
- Coordinates: 17°17′S 178°47′W
- Archipelago: Lau Islands

Administration
- Fiji
- Division: Eastern Division
- Province: Lau Province
- Tikina: Mualevu

Cikobia-i-Lau, (Note: The island is distinct from Cikobia-i-Ra or "Leeward Cikobia", which is the northern most of the Fijian islands.) or Cirikalia, is an island in the Lau Islands in the north-east of Fiji. The island has historically been called Thikombia, Thimkombia-i-Lau or Farewell Island.

== Environment ==
In the Quaternary period, Cikobia-i-Lau was one of the most seismically active islands in Fiji. In 1976 white-tailed tropic birds were using the islands cliffs as nest sites. The island is forested, has one village, as well as some caves, cliffs and gardens.

In 2016 Cyclone Winston damaged the island and its infrastructure, and repairs supported by the Fijian and New Zealand governments began in March.

== Society ==
In 1982 Cikobiai-Lau's islanders rescued a Californian family who had spent 25 days adrift before being stranded on a sand bar close to the island.

== Notable people ==
In 2016 the head man was Ledua Sele.

== Gallery ==
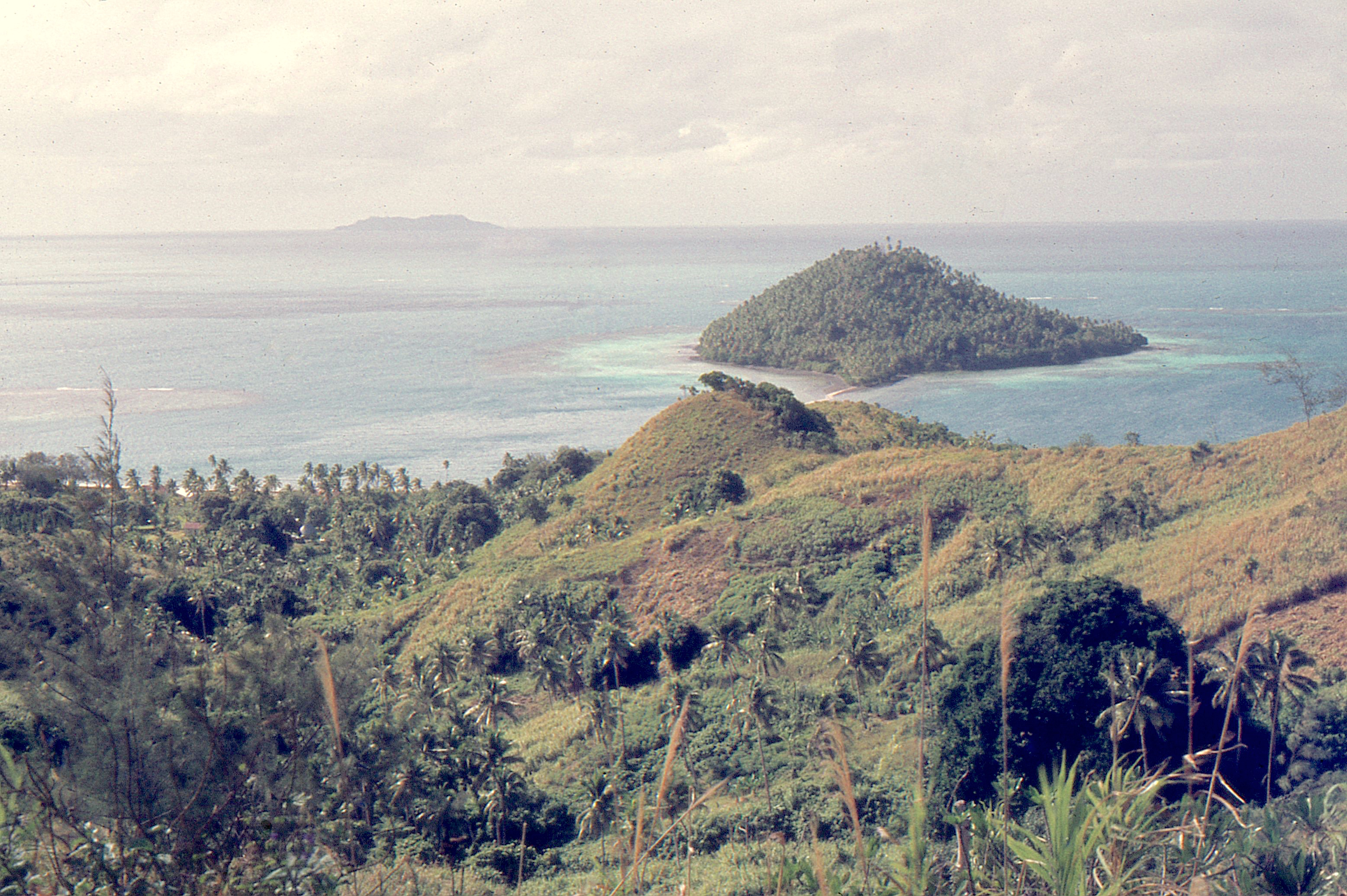
Patchwork of vegetation in foreground, looking past Yanuyanu Island across the huge lagoon towards Cikobia-i-Lau in the distance

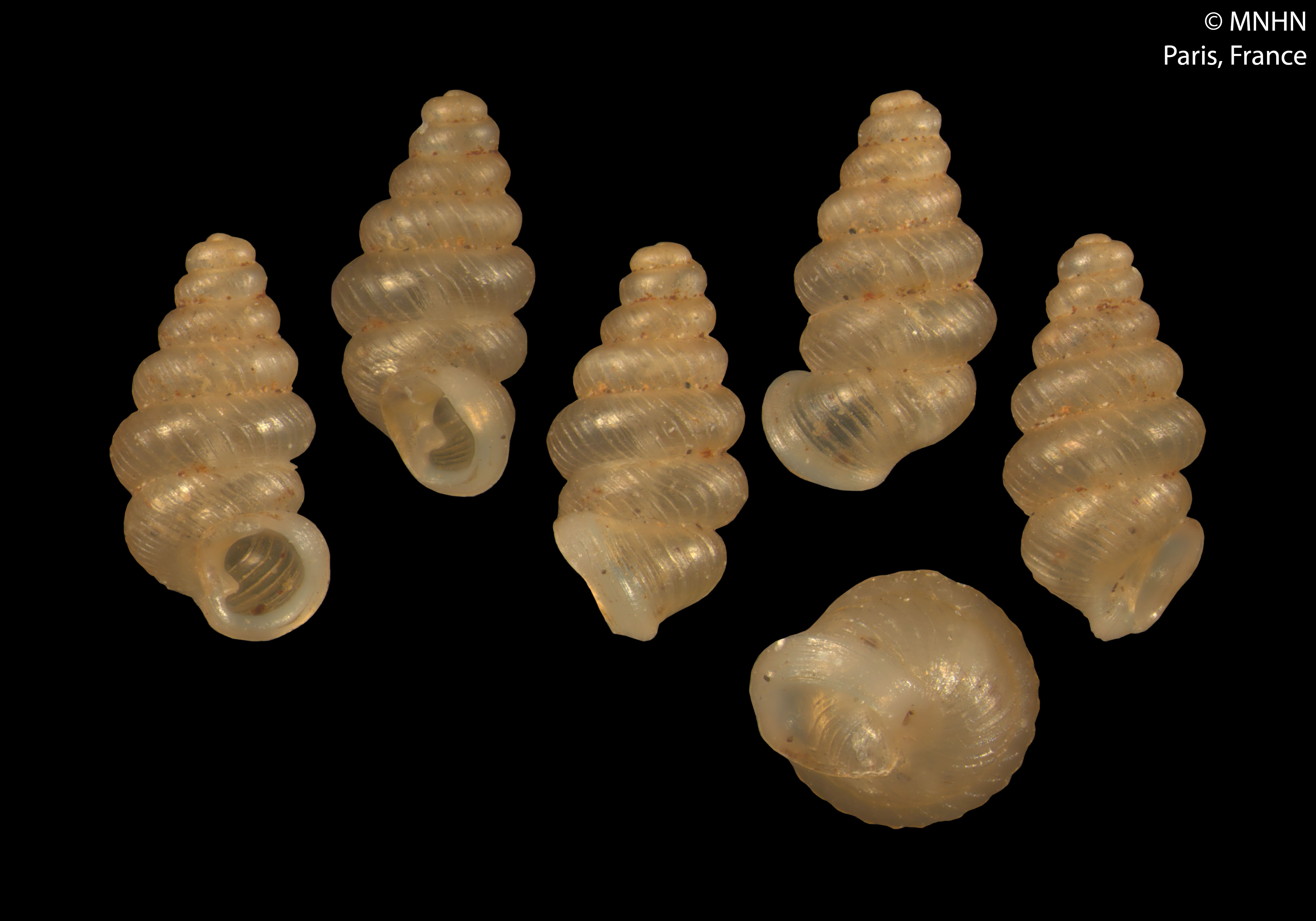
Holotype specimens of Moussonia bronieae, snails endemic to the island.

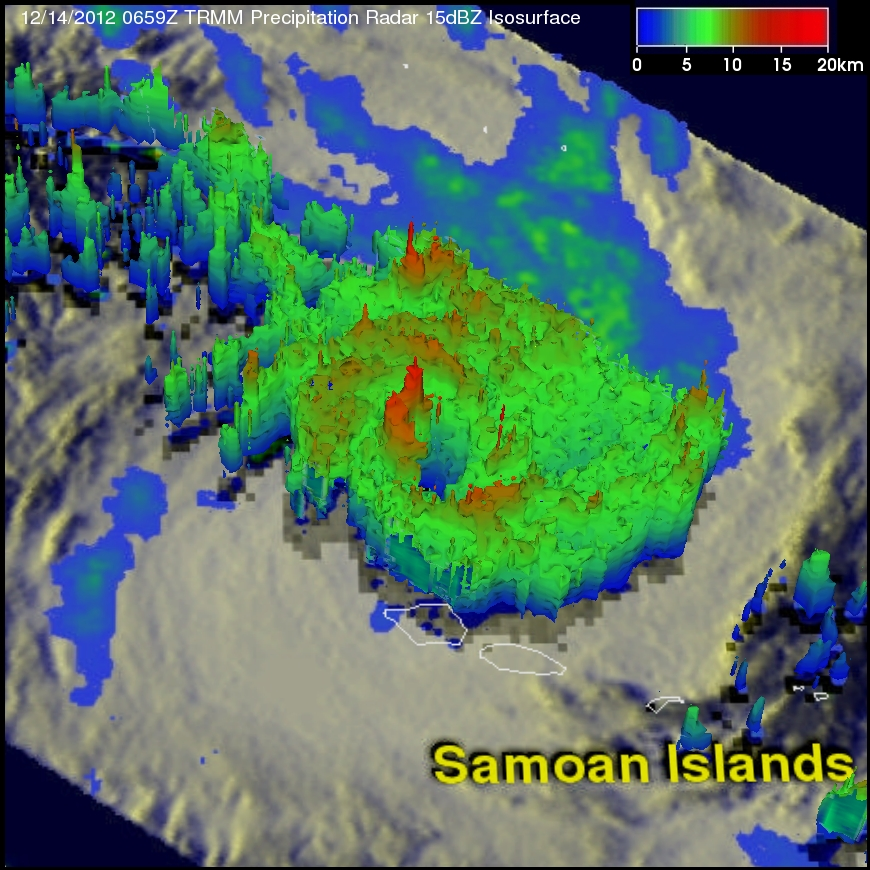
Cyclone over Cikobia-i-Lau, 2012
