= Rusiate Rogoyawa =

Fijian cross-country skier (born 1961)

Personal information
- Full name: Rusiate Rogoyawa
- National team: Fiji
- Born: 16 May 1961 (age 64); Cikobia-i-Lau, Fiji

Sport
- Sport: Cross-country skiing

Rusiate Rogoyawa (born 16 May 1961) is a Fijian cross-country skier. Born in Cikobia-i-Lau, he moved to Norway in 1982 to study electric engineering. His participation at the 1988 Winter Olympics, where he became the first athlete for Fiji at a Winter Olympics, was eventually funded by the International Olympic Committee. He competed in the men's 15 kilometre classical and placed 83rd out of the 85 athletes that competed. In the next years, he also took up boxing and rugby, before competing again at the 1994 Winter Olympics. In the men's 10 kilometre classical, he placed last.

== Biography ==
Rusiate Rogoyawa was born on 16 May 1961 in Cikobia-i-Lau, Fiji. His mother is Rusiate Nayatevakalaion. Rogoyawa stated that his first name meant "Richard the Lion-hearted" while his last name meant "well-known". He left his hometown in 1982 (Note: Several sources describe Rogoyawa abroad in 1982, but The Baltimore Sun gives 1983 instead.) to study electrical engineering in Oslo, Norway. There, he saw snow for the first time. While he was in Norway, he married a Norwegian woman.

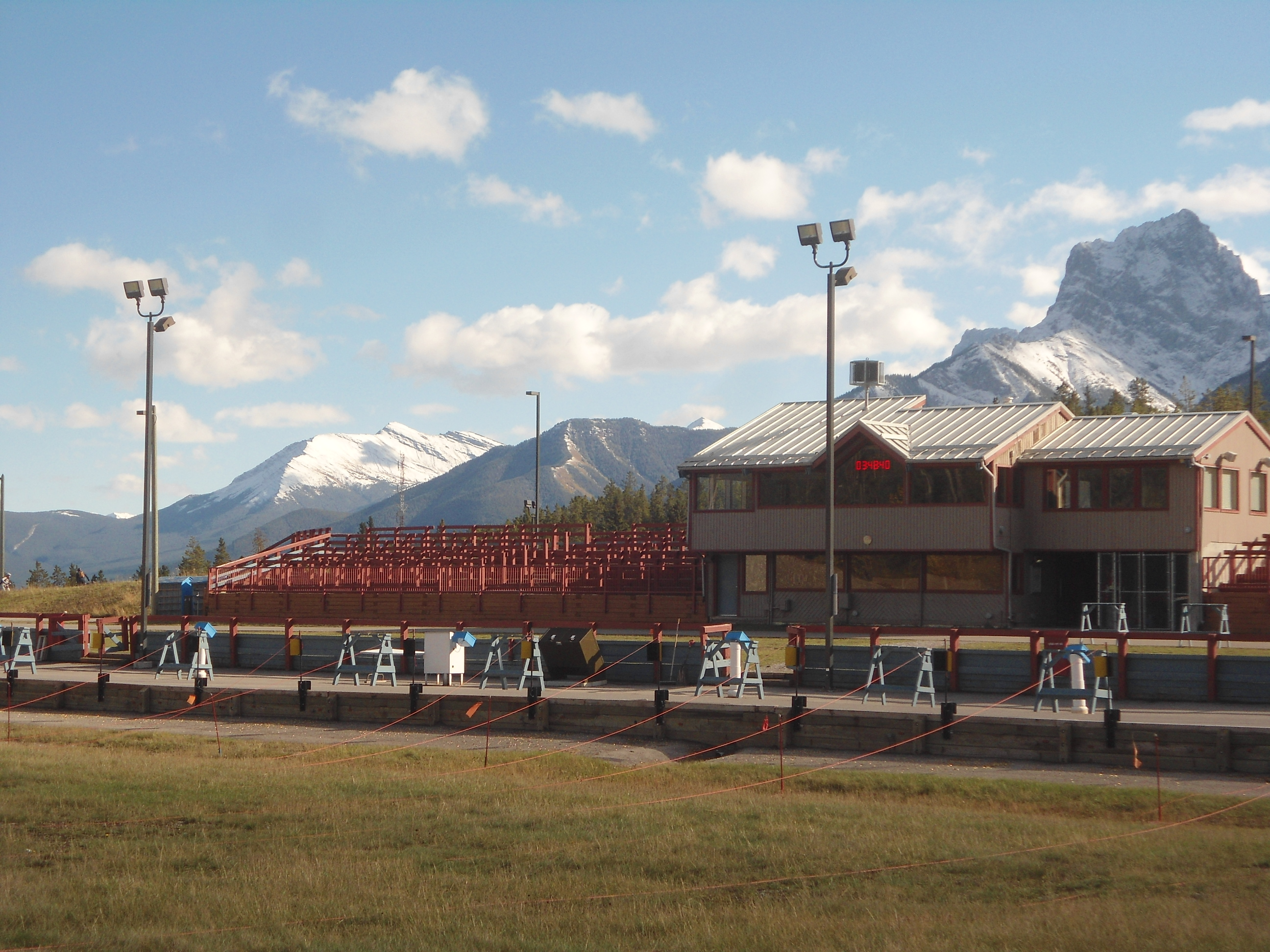
The competition venue for Rogoyawa's event at the 1988 Winter Games.

While studying, he started skiing and enjoyed the sport. He was coached by Torbjørn Kulstad. In 1987, he contacted sports officials back in Fiji in hope of representing the nation at an edition of the Winter Olympics. In September of the same year, the International Olympic Committee responded that they would fund his stint for the Winter Games as part of a programme for first-time competing nations. Rogoyawa represented Fiji at the 1988 Winter Olympics in Calgary, Canada. There, he was the first athlete for Fiji at a Winter Games, and thus the flag bearer for the opening ceremony. He competed in the men's 15 kilometre classical on 19 February against 89 other athletes. Going into the event, he stated that his goal was to not place last. He had placed 83rd after he had broken one of his skis early into the event.

Rogoyawa had planned to compete at the 1992 Winter Olympics, although he was not successful. He instead competed at the 1994 Winter Olympics in Lillehammer, Norway. Before the games, he had gained 9 kilograms (20 lb) of bodyweight and switched to the sports of boxing and rugby. He started cross-country skiing in September 1993 for his stint at the games. He was again designated as the flag bearer for the 1994 Winter Olympics opening ceremony. He competed in the men's 10 kilometre classical on 17 February against 87 other athletes. He had placed last with a time of 38:30.7. Upon completing the event, Rogoyawa had stated that he felt "heavy", though remained positive as he further stated that he wanted to show that Fijians can ski as well.

== See also ==
- Laurence Thoms, the only other Winter Olympian from Fiji
