= Bethany Calcaterra-McMahon =

American luger

Personal information
- Born: June 1, 1974 (age 50); Hartford, Connecticut, United States

Sport
- Sport: Luge

Bethany Calcaterra-McMahon (born June 1, 1974) is an American former luger. She competed at the 1994 Winter Olympics and the 1998 Winter Olympics. Despite success at a junior and senior level, Calcaterra-McMahon is chiefly remembered for being in an on-track accident when she was 19, involving a coach from the German team.

== Biography ==
Calcaterra-McMahon was born in Hartford, Connecticut in 1974. She won two medals at the Junior World Luge Championships, with a bronze in 1992 and a silver in 1994. As a junior, she won four national titles from 1989 to 1993, before winning the senior championship in 1995.

In 1994, during a training run in Winterberg, Germany, Calcaterra-McMahon was involved in an accident on the luge track. German coach Josef Lenz had gone onto the track to clean a section. However, Lenz, who he was deaf in one ear, did not hear a warning about a sled being on the track. Calcaterra-McMahon, who was on the sled heading down the track, hit Lenz while travelling at more than 70 mph. Lenz's suffered injuries that resulted in one of his legs being amputated below the knee. The two met up after the accident, prior to the 1994 Winter Olympics, with no apparent ill-feelings between them, and Lenz asking if they could go dancing one day.

At the 1994 Winter Olympics in Lillehammer, Calcaterra-McMahon competed in the women's singles event, finishing in twelfth place. Four years later, at the 1998 Winter Olympics in Nagano, she competed in the same event, this time finishing in eighth place. Calcaterra-McMahon retired after the 1998 Winter Olympics, due to a recurring shoulder injury.
