= Michael Slive =

American college athletic director, college athletic conference commissioner, attorney

- Slive in 2008
- Born: July 26, 1940; Utica, New York, U.S.
- Died: May 16, 2018 (aged 77); Birmingham, Alabama, U.S.
- Education: B.A., Dartmouth College, 1962; J.D., Virginia, 1965; LL.M., Georgetown, 1966
- Occupation: Commissioner
- Years active: 2002–2015
- Employer: Southeastern Conference

Michael Lawrence Slive (July 26, 1940 – May 16, 2018) was an American attorney and college sports executive. Slive was the commissioner of the Southeastern Conference (SEC), a college athletics association, from 2002 until 2015.

== Early life and education ==
Slive was born on July 26, 1940 in Utica, New York. His father Sol Slive owned a meat market and hoped for Mike to become a doctor. Slive was the quarterback of Utica Free Academy's high school football team, and became the first person in his family to attend college, when he enrolled in Dartmouth College as a premed and played college football. However, he soon switched from football to lacrosse, and from medicine to law. While at Dartmouth, he was president of Alpha Theta fraternity. He worked as a unionized meat cutter to pay for his tuition.

He graduated from Dartmouth College with a Bachelor of Arts degree in 1962. He earned a J.D. from the University of Virginia School of Law in 1965 and an LL.M. from the Georgetown University Law Center in 1966.

== Career ==
Slive began his career in 1969 as assistant director of athletics at Dartmouth College. Slive became the seventh commissioner of the SEC on July 1, 2002. He was the first commissioner of Conference USA from 1995 to 2002, and the first commissioner of the Great Midwest Conference upon its founding in 1991.

Early in his life, he practiced law in New Hampshire, serving as judge of the Hanover District Court from 1972 to 1977, and was a partner in a Chicago law firm. He was assistant director of athletics at Dartmouth College, assistant executive director of the Pacific-10 Conference, and director of athletics at Cornell University from 1981 to 1983. In 1990, he became senior partner and founder of the Mike Slive-Mike Glazier Sports Group, a legal practice specializing in representing colleges and universities in athletics-related matters.

As part of his role as the SEC Commissioner, he served as the coordinator of the Bowl Championship Series for the 2006 and 2007 regular seasons. He was a member of the NCAA Division I Men's Basketball Committee through September 2009 and served as the chairman of the committee for the 2008–09 academic year. He retired as commissioner effective July 31, 2015.

He chaired the NCAA Infractions Appeals Committee and the National Letter of Intent Steering Committee.

In 2009, Slive was inducted into the Greater Utica Sports Hall of Fame.

== Death ==
In his later years, Slive was diagnosed with prostate cancer. Before his death, he co-founded the Mike Slive Foundation for Prostate Cancer Research. He died on May 16, 2018, age 77, in Birmingham, Alabama. He is survived by his wife of 49 years, Liz, and their daughter, Anna.
