= Igor Obukhov (skier) =

Belarusian cross-country skier (born 1969)

Personal information
- Nationality: Belarusian
- Born: 4 April 1969 (age 55); Kirov, Russian SFSR, Soviet Union

Sport
- Sport: Cross-country skiing

Igor Obukhov (born 4 April 1969) is a Belarusian cross-country skier. He competed in the men's 10 kilometre classical event at the 1994 Winter Olympics.
