= Nathaniel Mills =

American speed skater (born 1970)

Personal information
- Full name: Nathaniel Lincoln Mills
- Nationality: American
- Born: February 15, 1970 (age 56) Chicago, Illinois, United States

Sport
- Sport: Speed skating

Nathaniel Lincoln Mills (born February 15, 1970) is an American speed skater. He was a three-time Olympian, competing at the 1992 Winter Olympics, 1994 Winter Olympics and, after a three-year retirement, 1998 Winter Olympics, when he was captain of the U.S. Olympic speedskating team. He also competed at the 1991 World Winter Universiade where he won a bronze in the 1,000 m; at the 1989 and 1991 World Championships, placing second in the 500 in 1991.

Mills transitioned into coaching following his competitive skating career. In the late 1990s, he helped coach the Canadian national team in Calgary. In 2002, Mills co-founded DC-ICE, a program that introduces youth in Washington, D.C. to skating sports. The program introduced two future Olympians, Maame Biney and Conor McDermott-Mostowy, to the sport. Mills has worked with other Olympians including Shani Davis.

Mills' is the brother of Olympic gymnast Phoebe Mills and Junior World Figure Skating Champion Jessica Mills. He also trained as a lawyer and actor.
