= Joan Guetschow =

American biathlete (born 1966)

Joan Guetschow (born September 6, 1966) is an American Olympic biathlete. She competed at the Olympic Games in 1992 in Albertville, France, and 1994 in Lillehammer, Norway. She finished 17th in Lillehammer in the 15 km distance event, hitting 19/20 targets. She also competed for her country in the World Championships in Lahti in 1991 and Borovetz in 1993. She was the overall winner of the first-ever Olympic Trials for the U.S. Women's Olympic Biathlon Team in 1992. In 1994 she also won Olympic Trials.

== High school ==
Guetschow attended Hopkins High School in Minnesota, where she earned an All-American Honorable Mention for swimming.

== Professional career ==
In triathlon she participated 1986 in Finland Championships Games and became second, right after Marjo Matikainen, Olympic gold medalist in cross-country skiing. In 1988, she placed first in the 10 km skate National Collegiate Ski Association Cross Country Ski Championships.

After competing, Guetschow was a U.S. National Development Coach for U.S. Biathlon from 1995 to 1999. In 1996 she received the U.S. Olympic Committee's, "Developmental Coach of the Year" award for biathlon. She also served as an athlete representative on the Board of Trustees Executive Committee for the 2002 Olympic and Paralympic Games in Salt Lake City, Utah.

== Personal life ==
Guetschow was one of the earliest female Olympic athletes to come out as a lesbian. She stated in an interview about lesbian athletes that her teammates were extremely supportive. She told an interviewer that "there were members of management that didn't go out of their way to make me their poster biathlete." She also was quoted as saying that her team, at the time, spent a lot of time in Europe, and that Europeans seemed to be less invasive, and couldn't care less about her sexuality.

Guetschow is married to Tricia Stumpf, World Championship Medalist in Skeleton. She has a twin brother, Dave Guetschow, who played professional soccer for the Portland Firebirds and was the goalkeeper for the United States national bandy team. Dave and Joan are dual U.S.-Canadian citizens since their mother, Janet Wallis Guetschow, was born and grew up in Winnipeg, Manitoba, Canada.
