= Olga Novikova (luger) =

Russian luger (born 1973)

Personal information
- Nationality: Russian
- Born: 23 January 1973 (age 52)

Sport
- Sport: Luge

Olga Novikova (born 23 January 1973) is a Russian luger. She competed in the women's singles event at the 1994 Winter Olympics.
