= Greece at the 1994 Winter Olympics =

- IOC code: GRE
- NOC: Committee of the Olympic Games
- Website: www.hoc.gr (in Greek and English)

in Lillehammer Norway
- Competitors: 9 in 5 sports
- Flag bearer: Thomai Lefousi
- Medals: Gold 0 Silver 0 Bronze 0 Total 0

Winter Olympics appearances (overview)
- 1936; 1948; 1952; 1956; 1960; 1964; 1968; 1972; 1976; 1980; 1984; 1988; 1992; 1994; 1998; 2002; 2006; 2010; 2014; 2018; 2022; 2026

Greece competed at the 1994 Winter Olympics in Lillehammer, Norway.

== Competitors ==
The following is the list of number of competitors in the Games.

Sport	Men	Women	Total
Alpine skiing	0	1	1
Biathlon	1	0	1
Bobsleigh	2	–	2
Cross-country skiing	3	0	3
Luge	1	1	2
Total	7	2	9

== Alpine skiing ==
Women

Athlete	Event	Final				
Athlete	Event	Run 1	Run 2	Run 3	Total	Rank
Thomai Lefousi	Slalom	1:12.16	DNF		DNF	

== Biathlon ==
Men

Athlete	Event	Final		
Athlete	Event	Time	Pen.	Rank
Athanassios Tsakiris	10 km Sprint	32:21.5	3	56
Athanassios Tsakiris	20 km Individual	1:01:51.7	1	37

== Bobsleigh ==
Athlete	Event	Final					
Athlete	Event	Run 1	Run 2	Run 3	Run 4	Total	Rank
Greg Sebald; Christopoulos Marinos	Two-man	54.83	54.83	55.03	54.71	3:39.40	34

== Cross-country skiing ==
Men

Athlete	Event	Final					
Athlete	Event	Start	Rank	Time	Rank	Total	Rank
Nikos Anastasiadis	10 km Classical					31:00.3	86
Nikos Anastasiadis	15 km Free Pursuit	+06:40	86	44:43.9	73	+15:35.1	73
Nikos Anastasiadis	30 km Free					1:30:54.7	68
Nikos Kalofiris	10 km Classical					30:17.0	82
Nikos Kalofiris	15 km Free Pursuit	+05:57	82	DNF		DNF	
Nikos Kalofiris	30 km Free					1:36:30.5	70
Christos Titas	10 km Classical					30:37.0	83
Christos Titas	30 km Free					1:36:41.5	71

== Luge ==
Men

Athlete	Event	Final					
Athlete	Event	Run 1	Run 2	Run 3	Run 4	Total	Rank
Spyros Pinas	Singles	51.996	52.170	51.782	51.864	3:27.812	24

Women

Athlete	Event	Final					
Athlete	Event	Run 1	Run 2	Run 3	Run 4	Total	Rank
Greta Sebald	Singles	1:43.585	50.824	49.777	49.955	4:14.141	24
