= Cammy Myler =

American luger

Personal information
- Born: December 7, 1968 (age 57) Plattsburgh, New York, United States

Sport
- Sport: Luge

Cameron "Cammy" Myler (born December 7, 1968) is an American luge athlete who was a member of the U.S. National Luge Team from 1985 to 1998 and competed on four Winter Olympics teams.

Cameron is also a photographer with works on display with the Art of the Olympians. She is a professor at NYU.

== Early life ==
She was introduced to luge when her parents volunteered during the 1980 Winter Olympics in Lake Placid, New York. Myler's uncle, Michael Luce, competed for the United States in bobsled at the 1968 Winter Olympics in Grenoble, finishing 11th in the two-man and 15th in the four-man events.

Cameron attended Dartmouth College, where she was a member of Alpha Theta. She graduated cum laude in 1995 with a degree in geography.

== Career ==
After retiring from luge after the 1998 Olympics in Nagano, Cameron attended Boston College Law School and received her J.D. in 2001. She practiced law at Milbank, Tweed, Hadley & McCloy in the Intellectual Property/Litigation Group for two years, and then to Frankfurt Kurnit Klein & Selz, an entertainment and media law firm in New York City. She has written and spoken on various issues relating to sports and intellectual property law.

== Olympic participation ==
=== Athletic ===
Myler competed on 4 U.S. Olympic Teams: 1988 (Calgary, Canada), 1992 (Albertville, France) 1994 (Lillehammer, Norway) and 1998 (Nagano, Japan).

She earned her best finish of fifth in the women's singles event in Albertville at the 1992 Olympics and was elected by her teammates to carry the American flag during the opening ceremony of the 1994 Winter Olympics in Lillehammer.

Myler won the first of her seven U.S. National Championships in 1985 at the age of 16.

Her best overall Luge World Cup seasonal finish was second in women's singles in 1991–92.

She won the U.S. National Championships seven times and was voted Female Athlete of the Year 9 times.

=== Professional ===
Cameron became a clinical assistant professor at New York University's Tisch Institute for Global Sport. Her teaching and research interests focus on Olympic and international sports. Myler teaches sports law, legal issues, intellectual property & licensing, organizations in sports, and oversees the undergraduate internship class. In 2016, Myler created the women in sports initiative, which provides students with an opportunity to meet with and learn from successful professionals in the sports industry.

She has been involved with Olympic sport both in the United States and internationally, and within the United States Olympic Committee is a member of the board of directors, the Athletes' Advisory Council, the legislation committee, the athlete support committee, and the Governance and Ethics Task Force. In 2003, she testified before the House Subcommittee on Commerce, Trade, and Consumer Protection regarding proposed reform to the governance structure of the US Olympic Committee. She is chair of the audit & ethics committee of USA Luge. She is an athlete ambassador for Kids Play International and an ambassador for Athlete Ally.

Olympic Games
Preceded by Francie Larrieu Smith	Flagbearer for the United States; Lillehammer 1994	Succeeded by Bruce Baumgartner
