= Erin Warren =

American luger

Personal information
- Born: December 31, 1971 (age 53); Winchester, Massachusetts, United States

Sport
- Sport: Luge

Erin Warren (born December 31, 1971) is an American luger. She competed at the 1994 Winter Olympics and the 1998 Winter Olympics.
