= Mark Gray (skier) =

Australian cross-country skier (born 1967)

Personal information
- Nationality: Australian
- Born: 12 November 1967 (age 57); Melbourne, Australia

Sport
- Sport: Cross-country skiing

Mark Gray (born 12 November 1967) is an Australian cross-country skier. He competed in the men's 10 kilometre classical event at the 1994 Winter Olympics.
