= Viktor Kamotsky =

Belarusian cross-country skier (born 1963)

Personal information
- Nationality: Belarusian
- Born: 20 April 1963 (age 61); Minsk, Byelorussian SSR, Soviet Union

Sport
- Sport: Cross-country skiing

Viktor Kamotsky (Belarusian: Віктар Барысавіч Камоцкі, romanized: Viktar Barysavich Kamotski, Russian: Виктор Борисович Камоцкий, romanized: Viktor Borisovich Kamotsky; born 20 April 1963 in Minsk) is a former Belarusian cross-country skier. He competed in the men's 10 kilometre classical event at the 1994 Winter Olympics.
