= Rob Parisien =

American alpine skier (born 1970)

Rob Parisien (born 19 March 1970) is an American former alpine skier who competed in the 1992 Winter Olympics.

After leaving the sport of ski racing following the 1992 Winter Olympics, he received a degree in philosophy from the University of Colorado in 1995. He then graduated with honors from Dartmouth Medical School in 1999 and completed the Harvard Combined Orthopedic Residency program in 2004.

He is now an orthopaedic trauma surgeon practicing in Manchester, New Hampshire.
