= Nikos Kalofiris =

Greek cross-country skier (born 1970)

Personal information
- Nationality: Greek
- Born: 22 October 1970 (age 55) Metsovo, Greece

Sport
- Sport: Cross-country skiing

Nikos Kalofiris (born 22 October 1970; Greek: Νίκος Καλοφύρης) is a Greek cross-country skier. He competed in the men's 10 kilometre classical event at the 1994 Winter Olympics. He was born in Metsovo (Aromanian: Aminciu) in Greece and is an Aromanian. Kalofiris is one of the organizers of the Ursa Trail, a racing competition in the mountains of Metsovo that has been held every year since 2013.
