= Daníel Jakobsson =

Icelandic cross-country skier (born 1973)

Personal information
- Born: 17 August 1973 (age 52) Reykjavík, Iceland
- Height: 177 cm (5 ft 10 in)
- Weight: 187 kg (412 lb)

Sport
- Sport: Cross-country skiing

Daníel Jakobsson (born August 17, 1973) is an Icelandic former cross-country skier and politician. He competed at the 1994 Winter Olympics in 15–50 km events and placed 44–65. During his career, he won several Icelandic championships in cross-country skiing.

After his skiing career he served as the mayor of Ísafjörður from 2010 to 2014.

== Early life ==
Daníel was born in Reykjavík, Iceland, to Jakob Hjálmarsson, the future priest of the Reykjavík Cathedral, and Auður Daníelsdóttir. He lived in Seyðisfjörður for his first four years before moving with his family to Ísafjörður where his father became a priest. In Ísafjörður he came across cross-country skiing.
