= Benjamin Husaby =

American cross-country skier (born 1965)

Personal information
- Born: December 26, 1965 (age 60) Eden Prairie, Minnesota, United States

Sport
- Sport: Cross-country skiing

Benjamin Husaby (born December 26, 1965) is an American cross-country skier. He competed at the 1992 Winter Olympics and the 1994 Winter Olympics.
