= Anne-Lise Parisien =

American alpine skier (born 1972)

Anne-Lise Parisien (born October 22, 1972, in Lewiston, Maine) is a former American alpine skier who competed in the 1994 Winter Olympics, finishing 13th in the women's giant slalom.
