= Christos Titas =

Greek cross-country skier (born 1968)

Personal information
- Nationality: Greek
- Born: 21 November 1968 (age 56); Florina, Greece

Sport
- Sport: Cross-country skiing

Christos Titas (born 21 November 1968) is a Greek cross-country skier. He competed at the 1988 Winter Olympics and the 1994 Winter Olympics.
