= Luke Bodensteiner =

American cross-country skier (born 1970)

Personal information
- Nationality: American
- Born: September 29, 1970 (age 55) Iowa City, Iowa, United States

Sport
- Sport: Cross-country skiing

Luke Bodensteiner (born September 29, 1970) is an American cross-country skier. He competed at the 1992 Winter Olympics and the 1994 Winter Olympics.
