= John Aalberg (skier) =

Norwegian-born American skier (born 1960)

Personal information
- Nationality: American
- Born: 14 October 1960 (age 64); Ørland Municipality, Norway
- Height: 1.83 m (6 ft 0 in)
- Weight: 72 kg (159 lb)

Sport
- Sport: Skiing
- Event: Cross-country

John Aalberg (born 14 October 1960) is a Norwegian-born American skier. He competed in cross-country skiing events at the 1992 and 1994 Winter Olympics.
