= Alpine skiing at the 1992 Winter Olympics – Men's slalom =

Men's slalom at the XVI Olympic Winter Games
- Alpine skiing
- Venue: Les Ménuires
- Date: February 22, 1992
- Competitors: 119 from 44 nations
- Winning time: 1:44.39

Medalists
1st place, gold medalist(s)		Finn Christian Jagge	Norway
2nd place, silver medalist(s)		Alberto Tomba	Italy
3rd place, bronze medalist(s)		Michael Tritscher	Austria

The Men's slalom competition of the Albertville 1992 Olympics was held at Les Ménuires.

The defending world champion was Marc Girardelli of Luxembourg, who was also the defending World Cup slalom champion, while Alberto Tomba was the leader of the 1992 World Cup.

== Results ==
Rank	Name	Country	Run 1	Run 2	Total	Difference
1st place, gold medalist(s)	Finn Christian Jagge	Norway	0:51.43	0:52.96	1:44.39	-
2nd place, silver medalist(s)	Alberto Tomba	Italy	0:53.01	0:51.66	1:44.67	+0.28
3rd place, bronze medalist(s)	Michael Tritscher	Austria	0:52.50	0:52.35	1:44.85	+0.46
4	Patrick Staub	Switzerland	0:52.56	0:52.88	1:45.44	+1.05
5	Thomas Fogdö	Sweden	0:52.85	0:52.63	1:45.48	+1.09
6	Paul Accola	Switzerland	0:52.64	0:52.98	1:45.62	+1.23
7	Michael von Grünigen	Switzerland	0:53.62	0:52.80	1:46.42	+2.03
8	Jonas Nilsson	Sweden	0:53.58	0:52.99	1:46.57	+2.18
9	Thomas Stangassinger	Austria	0:53.51	0:53.14	1:46.65	+2.26
10	Matt Grosjean	United States	0:53.79	0:53.15	1:46.94	+2.55
11	Carlo Gerosa	Italy	0:53.18	0:53.92	1:47.10	+2.71
12	François Simond	France	0:53.88	0:53.61	1:47.49	+3.10
13	Hubert Strolz	Austria	0:54.06	0:53.73	1:47.79	+3.40
14	Mats Ericson	Sweden	0:53.92	0:54.09	1:48.01	+3.62
15	Bernhard Gstrein	Austria	0:54.12	0:54.14	1:48.26	+3.87
16	Peter Roth	Germany	0:54.07	0:54.68	1:48.75	+4.36
17	Andrej Miklavc	Slovenia	0:55.02	0:54.45	1:49.47	+5.08
18	Tetsuya Okabe	Japan	0:54.99	0:54.49	1:49.48	+5.09
19	Jure Košir	Slovenia	0:54.88	0:54.61	1:49.49	+5.10
20	Rob Crossan	Canada	0:55.21	0:54.65	1:49.86	+5.47
21	Konrad Kurt Ladstaetter	Italy	0:54.68	0:55.19	1:49.87	+5.48
22	Gregor Grilc	Slovenia	0:54.73	0:55.22	1:49.95	+5.56
23	Kyle Wieche	United States	0:55.42	0:55.70	1:51.12	+6.73
24	Klemen Bergant	Slovenia	0:56.27	0:56.25	1:52.52	+8.13
25	Peter Jurko	Czechoslovakia	0:55.95	0:56.85	1:52.80	+8.41
26	Petar Dichev	Bulgaria	0:56.21	0:56.70	1:52.91	+8.52
27	Abraham Fernández	Spain	0:56.64	0:56.33	1:52.97	+8.58
28	Jorge Pujol	Spain	0:56.73	0:56.28	1:53.01	+8.62
29	Willy Raine	Canada	0:56.80	0:56.52	1:53.32	+8.93
30	Stéphane Exartier	France	0:58.31	0:55.59	1:53.90	+9.51
31	Ricardo Campo	Spain	0:56.99	0:57.53	1:54.52	+10.13
32	Gerard Escoda	Andorra	0:57.35	0:57.60	1:54.95	+10.56
33	Borislav Dimitrachkov	Bulgaria	0:57.48	0:57.67	1:55.15	+10.76
34	Sean Langmuir	Great Britain	0:58.04	0:57.69	1:55.73	+11.34
35	Örnólfur Valdimarsson	Iceland	0:58.12	0:58.36	1:56.48	+12.09
36	Vedran Pavlek	Croatia	0:58.75	0:58.53	1:57.28	+12.89
37	Attila Bónis	Hungary	0:59.54	0:59.48	1:59.02	+14.63
38	Balázs Tornay	Hungary	0:59.39	1:01.13	2:00.52	+16.13
39	Federico Van Ditmar	Argentina	1:00.62	1:00.87	2:01.49	+17.10
40	Choi Yong-Hee	South Korea	1:00.76	1:02.29	2:03.05	+18.66
41	Aurel Foiciuc	Romania	1:02.57	1:01.77	2:04.34	+19.95
42	Zoran Perušina	Yugoslavia	1:01.43	1:03.11	2:04.54	+20.15
43	Péter Kristály	Hungary	1:03.17	1:04.89	2:08.06	+23.67
44	Alekhis Fotiadis	Cyprus	1:07.10	1:07.66	2:14.76	+30.37
45	Taner Üstündağ	Turkey	1:09.13	1:08.65	2:17.78	+33.39
46	Slałan Ilić	Yugoslavia	1:11.48	1:08.59	2:20.07	+35.68
47	Sokratis Aristodimou	Cyprus	1:12.68	1:11.21	2:23.89	+39.50
48	Hans Egger	Brazil	1:11.95	1:12.56	2:24.51	+40.12
49	Michael Teruel	Philippines	1:13.95	1:13.54	2:27.49	+43.10
50	Guillermo Avila	Bolivia	1:13.94	1:14.31	2:28.25	+43.86
51	Cevdet Can	Turkey	1:15.21	1:13.24	2:28.45	+44.06
52	Brahim Ait Sibrahim	Morocco	1:15.13	1:14.87	2:30.00	+45.61
53	Jean Khalil	Lebanon	1:17.07	1:16.06	2:33.13	+48.74
54	Juan-Carlos Elizondo	Mexico	1:27.91	1:13.88	2:41.79	+57.40
55	Andreas Vasili	Cyprus	1:11.97	1:34.70	2:46.67	+62.28
56	Daniel Stahle	Bolivia	1:23.45	1:24.97	2:48.42	+64.03
57	Manuel Aramayo	Bolivia	1:27.27	1:25.29	2:52.56	+68.17
58	Nanak Chand	India	1:30.02	1:23.89	2:53.91	+69.52
59	José-Manuel Bejarano	Bolivia	1:30.13	1:24.55	2:54.68	+70.29
60	El-Hassan Mahta	Morocco	1:29.74	1:27.72	2:57.46	+73.07
61	Lal Chuni	India	1:33.80	1:29.25	3:03.05	+78.66
62	Dany Abounaoum	Lebanon	1:31.08	1:32.68	3:03.76	+79.37
63	Robert Scott Detlof	Brazil	2:06.00	1:12.58	3:18.58	+94.19
64	Julián Muñoz	Costa Rica	1:53.09	1:51.02	3:44.11	+119.72
65	Alejandro Preinfalk	Costa Rica	2:09.83	2:19.30	4:29.13	+164.74
-	Ole Kristian Furuseth	Norway	0:53.14	DNF	-	-
-	Armin Bittner	Germany	0:53.19	DNF	-	-
-	Fabio De Crignis	Italy	0:53.31	DQ	-	-
-	Kjetil André Aamodt	Norway	0:54.42	DNF	-	-
-	Alain Feutrier	France	0:54.50	DNF	-	-
-	Johan Wallner	Sweden	0:55.29	DNF	-	-
-	Marián Bíreš	Czechoslovakia	0:56.01	DNF	-	-
-	Brad King	Canada	0:56.42	DNF	-	-
-	Bill Gaylord	Great Britain	0:58.88	DNF	-	-
-	Jakub Malczewski	Poland	1:00.59	DNF	-	-
-	Pierre Kőszáli	Hungary	1:00.66	DNF	-	-
-	Hur Seung-Wook	South Korea	1:01.19	DNF	-	-
-	Jorge Eduardo Ballesteros	Mexico	1:03.85	DNF	-	-
-	Carlos Mier y Terán	Mexico	1:04.50	DNF	-	-
-	Lamine Guèye	Senegal	1:10.90	DNF	-	-
-	Hicham Diddou	Morocco	1:25.01	DNF	-	-
-	Patrice Bianchi	France	DNF	-	-	-
-	Steve Locher	Switzerland	DNF	-	-	-
-	Joe Levins	United States	DNF	-	-	-
-	Didrik Marksten	Norway	DNF	-	-	-
-	Kiminobu Kimura	Japan	DNF	-	-	-
-	Takuya Ishioka	Japan	DNF	-	-	-
-	Casey Puckett	United States	DNF	-	-	-
-	Lyubomir Popov	Bulgaria	DNF	-	-	-
-	Ovidio García	Spain	DNF	-	-	-
-	Simon Wi Rutene	New Zealand	DNF	-	-	-
-	Kristinn Björnsson	Iceland	DNF	-	-	-
-	Nahum Orobitg	Andorra	DNF	-	-	-
-	Stephen Edwards	Great Britain	DNF	-	-	-
-	Christopher Blagden	Great Britain	DNF	-	-	-
-	Marcin Szafrański	Poland	DNF	-	-	-
-	Ramon Rossell	Andorra	DNF	-	-	-
-	Nils Gelbjerg-Hansen	Denmark	DNF	-	-	-
-	Emilian Focşeneanu	Romania	DNF	-	-	-
-	Gáston Begue	Argentina	DNF	-	-	-
-	Thomas Lefousi	Greece	DNF	-	-	-
-	Nicola Ercolani	San Marino	DNF	-	-	-
-	John Campbell	Virgin Islands	DNF	-	-	-
-	Ioannis Kapraras	Greece	DNF	-	-	-
-	Keith Fraser	Swaziland	DNF	-	-	-
-	Jason Gasperoni	San Marino	DNF	-	-	-
-	Rejmon Horo	Yugoslavia	DNF	-	-	-
-	Ahmet Demir	Turkey	DNF	-	-	-
-	Sérgio Schuler	Brazil	DNF	-	-	-
-	German Sánchez	Mexico	DNF	-	-	-
-	Marcelo Apovian	Brazil	DNF	-	-	-
-	Chen Tong-Jong	Chinese Taipei	DNF	-	-	-
-	Raymond Keyrouz	Lebanon	DNF	-	-	-
-	Enis Bećirbegović	Yugoslavia	DNF	-	-	-
-	Mourad Guerri	Algeria	DNF	-	-	-
-	Brahim Izdag	Morocco	DNF	-	-	-
-	Allaoua Latef	Algeria	DNF	-	-	-
-	Alphonse Gomis	Senegal	DNF	-	-	-
