= Hungary at the 1992 Winter Olympics =

- IOC code: HUN
- NOC: Hungarian Olympic Committee
- Website: www.olimpia.hu (in Hungarian and English)

in Albertville
- Competitors: 24 (13 men and 11 women) in 6 sports
- Flag bearer: Attila Tóth (figure skating)
- Medals: Gold 0 Silver 0 Bronze 0 Total 0

Winter Olympics appearances (overview)
- 1924; 1928; 1932; 1936; 1948; 1952; 1956; 1960; 1964; 1968; 1972; 1976; 1980; 1984; 1988; 1992; 1994; 1998; 2002; 2006; 2010; 2014; 2018; 2022; 2026

Hungary competed at the 1992 Winter Olympics in Albertville, France.

== Competitors ==
The following is the list of number of competitors in the Games.

Sport	Men	Women	Total
Alpine skiing	4	2	6
Biathlon	5	4	9
Cross-country skiing	1	1	2
Figure skating	2	3	5
Short track speed skating	1	1	2
Speed skating	1	1	2
Total	13	11	24

== Alpine skiing ==
Men

Athlete	Event	Race 1	Race 2	Total	
Athlete	Event	Time	Time	Time	Rank
Péter Kristály	Downhill			2:09.88	43
Balázs Tornay	Super-G			DNF	–
Péter Kristály	Super-G			1:23.47	65
Pierre Kőszáli	Super-G			1:21.45	57
Attila Bónis	Super-G			1:21.10	56
Péter Kristály	Giant Slalom	1:18.34	1:16.04	2:34.38	56
Balázs Tornay	Giant Slalom	1:16.71	1:13.00	2:29.71	50
Attila Bónis	Giant Slalom	1:13.98	DNF	DNF	–
Pierre Kőszáli	Giant Slalom	1:12.73	1:10.63	2:23.36	42
Péter Kristály	Slalom	1:03.17	1:04.89	2:08.06	43
Pierre Kőszáli	Slalom	1:00.66	DNF	DNF	–
Attila Bónis	Slalom	59.54	59.48	1:59.02	37
Balázs Tornay	Slalom	59.39	1:01.13	2:00.52	38

Men's combined

Athlete	Downhill	Slalom		Total	
Athlete	Time	Time 1	Time 2	Points	Rank
Péter Kristály	2:00.42	58.52	1:01.61	265.18	37
Pierre Kőszáli	1:56.25	55.79	1:05.03	226.57	33

Women

Athlete	Event	Race 1	Race 2	Total	
Athlete	Event	Time	Time	Time	Rank
Vera Gönczi	Super-G			1:37.90	44
Annamária Bónis	Super-G			1:37.68	43
Vera Gönczi	Giant Slalom	1:18.75	DNF	DNF	–
Annamária Bónis	Giant Slalom	1:17.37	1:19.63	2:37.00	34
Annamária Bónis	Slalom	DNF	–	DNF	–
Vera Gönczi	Slalom	59.97	55.36	1:55.33	32

== Biathlon ==
Men

Event	Athlete	Misses ^{1}	Time	Rank
10 km Sprint	László Farkas	2	31:43.6	82
10 km Sprint	János Panyik	3	30:13.0	73
10 km Sprint	Gábor Mayer	0	29:55.6	69
10 km Sprint	Tibor Géczi	1	28:15.5	38

Event	Athlete	Time	Misses	Adjusted time ^{2}	Rank
20 km	László Farkas	1'02:54.3	8	1'10:54.3	83
20 km	István Oláh Nelu	1'02:08.6	7	1'09:08.6	80
20 km	János Panyik	1'00:37.7	8	1'08:37.7	78
20 km	Tibor Géczi	59:56.3	4	1'03:56.3	55

Men's 4 x 7.5 km relay

Athletes	Race		
Athletes	Misses ^{1}	Time	Rank
János Panyik; László Farkas; Gábor Mayer; Tibor Géczi	2	1'32:50.7	15

Women

Event	Athlete	Misses ^{1}	Time	Rank
7.5 km Sprint	Anna Bozsik	4	33:44.8	67
7.5 km Sprint	Beatrix Holéczy	2	32:44.5	66
7.5 km Sprint	Kathalin Czifra	3	32:04.4	65
7.5 km Sprint	Brigitta Bereczki	6	29:42.6	61

Event	Athlete	Time	Misses	Adjusted time ^{2}	Rank
15 km	Kathalin Czifra	DNF	–	DNF	–
15 km	Anna Bozsik	55:47.0	10	1'05:47.0	66
15 km	Beatrix Holéczy	58:56.4	4	1'02:56.4	59
15 km	Brigitta Bereczki	54:18.2	5	59:18.2	44

Women's 3 x 7.5 km relay

Athletes	Race		
Athletes	Misses ^{1}	Time	Rank
Brigitta Bereczki; Kathalin Czifra; Beatrix Holéczy	3	1'31:31.1	16

^{1} A penalty loop of 150 metres had to be skied per missed target.
^{2} One minute added per missed target.

== Cross-country skiing ==
Men

Event	Athlete	Race	
Event	Athlete	Time	Rank
10 km C	István Oláh Nelu	37:37.7	100
15 km pursuit^{1} F	István Oláh Nelu	54:49.2	85

^{1} Starting delay based on 10 km results.
C = Classical style, F = Freestyle

Women

Event	Athlete	Race	
Event	Athlete	Time	Rank
5 km C	Anna Bozsik	18:29.0	59
10 km pursuit^{2} F	Anna Bozsik	36:39.8	54
15 km C	Anna Bozsik	53:46.5	48

^{2} Starting delay based on 5 km results.
C = Classical style, F = Freestyle

== Figure skating ==
Women

Athlete	SP	FS	TFP	Rank
Krisztina Czakó	19	23	32.5	23

Ice Dancing

Athletes	CD1	CD2	OD	FD	TFP	Rank
Regina Woodward; Csaba Szentpetery	13	15	15	14	29.0	14
Klára Engi; Attila Tóth	6	6	7	7	13.6	7

== Short track speed skating ==
Men

Athlete	Event	Round one		Quarter finals		Semi finals		Finals	
Athlete	Event	Time	Rank	Time	Rank	Time	Rank	Time	Final rank
Tibor Kun Bálint	1000 m	1:36.86	4	did not advance					

Women

Athlete	Event	Round one		Quarter finals		Semi finals		Finals	
Athlete	Event	Time	Rank	Time	Rank	Time	Rank	Time	Final rank
Tamara Kaszala	500 m	52.38	4	did not advance					

== Speed skating ==
Men

Event	Athlete	Race	
Event	Athlete	Time	Rank
500 m	Csaba Madarász	40.41	37
1000 m	Csaba Madarász	1:20.58	41
1500 m	Csaba Madarász	2:05.00	42

Women

Event	Athlete	Race	
Event	Athlete	Time	Rank
500 m	Krisztina Egyed	43.39	32
1000 m	Krisztina Egyed	1:27.81	34
1500 m	Krisztina Egyed	2:21.11	32
