= La face de Bellevarde =

Ski course in Val-d'Isère, France

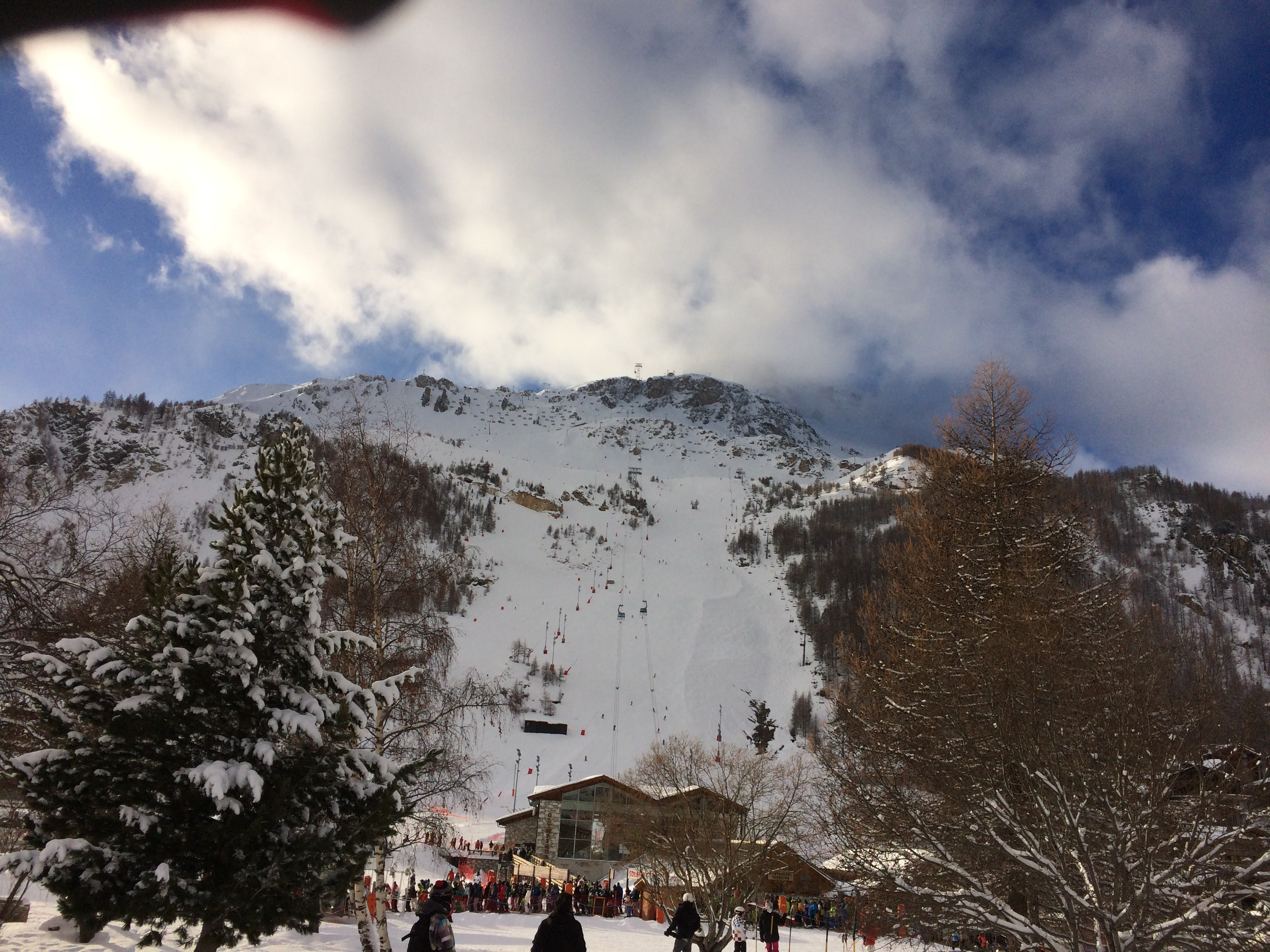
- Interactive map of La face de Bellevarde
- Location within France Location within Alps Location within Europe
- 45°26′47″N 6°58′21″E
- Location: Val-d'Isère, Savoie, France
- Mountain: Rocher de Bellevarde
- Opened: 1992; 34 years ago
- Architect: Bernhard Russi (SUI)
- Level: Expert
- Competition: Critérium of the First Snow

Downhill
- Start: 2,807 m (9,209 ft) (AA)
- Finish: 1,848 m (6,063 ft)
- Vertical drop: 959 m (3,146 ft)
- Length: 2.998 km (1.863 mi)
- Max incline: 35.4° degrees (71%)
- Avg incline: 17.8° degrees (32.1%)
- Min incline: 2.8° degrees (5%)

Giant slalom
- Start: 2,300 m (7,546 ft) (AA)
- Finish: 1,850 m (6,070 ft)
- Vertical drop: 450 m (1,476 ft)
- Max incline: 32.6° degrees (64%)
- Avg incline: 24.7° degrees (46%)
- Min incline: 13.5° degrees (24%)

La face de Bellevarde is a World Cup downhill ski course in France, on Rocher de Bellevarde mountain in Val-d'Isère, Savoie; it debuted at the 1992 Winter Olympics with the men's downhill.

It is only about two kilometres (1.2 mi) kilometres up the road from "Piste Oreiller-Killy" in La Daille, another legendary course with a lengthier World Cup tradition.

With 24.7 degrees (46%) incline, not counting the full dowhnill course, it is by far the world's steepest giant slalom and course in general in average gradient, with no flat sections, only steepness the whole time.

This competition is known as the Critérium of the First Snow (Critérium de la première neige).

== History ==
The course was developed for the 1992 Winter Olympics, designed by Swiss Olympic downhill champion Bernhard Russi, a respected constructor of downhill slopes around the world. The official opening was planned for late 1991 with two World Cup events, but the course was not yet finished. Both were moved to the nearby Oreiller-Killy course, and held on 7–8 December.

The Bellevarde course was officially opened two months later at the Olympics with the men's downhill competition; later events on the slope included combined, super-G, and giant slalom.

Near the end of 1992, the World Cup circuit premiered on this course with Super-G and slalom events on 6–7 December; the downhill was cancelled due to poor weather conditions. In February 2008, World Cup races returned after an absence of more than fifteen years; it became a regular host on the men's calendar, rarely exchanged with Oreiller-Killy.

A year later in February 2009, Val d'Isere hosted its first World Championships. All of the men's events and the women's technical events (GS, SL) were held on the Bellevarde slope; the team event was cancelled.

=== Course sections from GS start ===
- Passage de la Rute
- Le Rocher
- Slalom Start
- Le Mur
- Le Stade Olympique
- La Flamme

== Olympics ==
=== Men's events ===
Event	Type	Date	Gold	Silver	Bronze
1992	DH	9 February 1992	(Austria) Patrick Ortlieb	(France) Franck Piccard	(Austria) Günther Mader
1992	KB	10–11 February 1992	(Italy) Josef Polig	(Italy) Gianfranco Martin	(Switzerland) Steve Locher
1992	SG	16 February 1992	(Norway) Kjetil André Aamodt	(Luxembourg) Marc Girardelli	(Norway) Jan Einar Thorsen
1992	GS	18 February 1992	(Italy) Alberto Tomba	(Luxembourg) Marc Girardelli	(Norway) Kjetil André Aamodt

The slalom was held at Les Menuires on 22 February.

== World Championships ==
=== Men's events ===
Event	Type	Date	Gold	Silver	Bronze
2009	SG	4 February 2009	(Switzerland) Didier Cuche	(Italy) Peter Fill	(Norway) Aksel Lund Svindal
2009	DH	7 February 2009	(Canada) John Kucera	(Switzerland) Didier Cuche	(Switzerland) Carlo Janka
2009	SC	9 February 2009	(Norway) Aksel Lund Svindal	(France) Julien Lizeroux	(Croatia) Natko Zrnčić-Dim
2009	GS	13 February 2009	(Switzerland) Carlo Janka	(Austria) Benjamin Raich	(United States) Ted Ligety
2009	SL	15 February 2009	(Austria) Manfred Pranger	(France) Julien Lizeroux	(Canada) Michael Janyk

=== Women's events ===
Event	Type	Date	Gold	Silver	Bronze
2009	GS	12 February 2009	(Germany) Kathrin Hölzl	(Slovenia) Tina Maze	(Finland) Tanja Poutiainen
2009	SL	15 February 2009	(Germany) Maria Riesch	(Czech Republic) Šárka Záhrobská	(Finland) Tanja Poutiainen

The downhill, super-G, and combined events were held at Piste Rhône-Alpes.

=== Team event ===
Poor weather conditions.

Event	Type	Date	Gold	Silver	Bronze
2009	PG	11 February 2009	cancelled due to heavy snowfall over the night		

== World Cup ==
It is part of traditional annual "Critérium of the First Snow" (Critérium de la première neige) competition.

Bernhard Russi (SUI)	Marcel Hirscher (AUT)
300x	300x
The course constructor	won record 5 giant slaloms and 2 slaloms

=== Men ===
No.	Type	Season	Date	Winner	Second	Third
	DH	1991/92	7 December 1991	course was not yet ready for scheduled premiere; replaced on nearby Oreiller-Killy course		
	SG	1991/92	8 December 1991	course was not yet ready for scheduled premiere; replaced on nearby Oreiller-Killy course		
	DH	1992/93	4 December 1992	downhill cancelled due to poor weather conditions		
762	SG	1992/93	5 December 1992	(Norway) Jan Einar Thorsen	(Switzerland) Franz Heinzer	(Italy) Luigi Colturi
763	SL	1992/93	6 December 1992	(Sweden) Thomas Fogdö	(Austria) Thomas Sykora	(Austria) Hubert Strolz
	DH	2007/08	2 February 2008	replaced in Kvitfjell on 29 February 2008		
1325	SC	2007/08	3 February 2008	(United States) Bode Miller	(Croatia) Ivica Kostelić	(Croatia) Natko Zrnčić-Dim
1345	SC	2008/09	12 December 2008	(Austria) Benjamin Raich	(France) Jean-Baptiste Grange	(Austria) Marcel Hirscher
1346	GS	2008/09	13 December 2008	(Switzerland) Carlo Janka	(Italy) Massimiliano Blardone	(France) Gauthier de Tessières
	SL	2008/09	14 December 2008	strong winds; replaced in Alta Badia on 22 December 2008		
1381	SC	2009/10	11 December 2009	(Austria) Benjamin Raich	(Austria) Marcel Hirscher	(Italy) Manfred Mölgg (Austria) Romed Baumann
1382	SG	2009/10	12 December 2009	(Austria) Michael Walchhofer	(United States) Ted Ligety	(Italy) Werner Heel
1383	GS	2009/10	13 December 2009	(Austria) Marcel Hirscher	(Italy) Massimiliano Blardone	(Austria) Benjamin Raich
1413	GS	2010/11	11 December 2010	(United States) Ted Ligety	(Norway) Aksel Lund Svindal	(Italy) Massimiliano Blardone
1414	SL	2010/11	12 December 2010	(Austria) Marcel Hirscher	(Austria) Benjamin Raich	(France) Steve Missillier
	GS	2011/12	10 December 2011	lack of snow; replaced in Beaver Creek on 6 December 2011		
	SL	2011/12	11 December 2011	lack of snow; replaced in Beaver Creek on 8 December 2011		
1495	SL	2012/13	8 December 2012	(France) Alexis Pinturault	(Germany) Felix Neureuther	(Austria) Marcel Hirscher
1496	GS	2012/13	9 December 2012	(Austria) Marcel Hirscher	(Germany) Stefan Luitz	(United States) Ted Ligety
1529	GS	2013/14	14 December 2013	(Austria) Marcel Hirscher	(France) Thomas Fanara	(Germany) Stefan Luitz
1530	SL	2013/14	15 December 2013	(Austria) Mario Matt	(Sweden) Mattias Hargin	(Italy) Patrick Thaler
	GS	2014/15	13 December 2014	lack of snow; replaced in Åre on 12 December 2014		
	SL	2014/15	14 December 2014	lack of snow; replaced in Åre on 14 December 2014		
1599	GS	2015/16	12 December 2015	(Austria) Marcel Hirscher	(Germany) Felix Neureuther	(France) Victor Muffat-Jeandet
1600	SL	2015/16	13 December 2015	(Norway) Henrik Kristoffersen	(Austria) Marcel Hirscher	(Germany) Felix Neureuther
1642	GS	2016/17	10 December 2016	(France) Alexis Pinturault	(Austria) Marcel Hirscher	(Norway) Henrik Kristoffersen
1643	SL	2016/17	11 December 2016	(Norway) Henrik Kristoffersen	(Austria) Marcel Hirscher	(Russia) Aleksandr Khoroshilov
1679	GS	2017/18	9 December 2017	(France) Alexis Pinturault	(Germany) Stefan Luitz	(Austria) Marcel Hirscher
1680	SL	2017/18	10 December 2017	(Austria) Marcel Hirscher	(Norway) Henrik Kristoffersen	(Sweden) André Myhrer
1715	GS	2018/19	8 December 2018	(Austria) Marcel Hirscher	(Norway) Henrik Kristoffersen	(Sweden) Matts Olsson
	SL	2018/19	9 December 2018	heavy snowfall and wind; replaced in Saalbach-Hinterglemm on 20 December 2018		
	GS	2019/20	14 December 2019	moved on 15th due to weather, then finally cancelled; replaced in Hinterstoder on 1 March 2020		
1754	SL	2019/20	15 December 2019	(France) Alexis Pinturault	(Sweden) André Myhrer	(Italy) Stefano Gross
1824	GS	2021/22	11 December 2021	(Switzerland) Marco Odermatt	(France) Alexis Pinturault	(Austria) Manuel Feller
1825	SL	2021/22	12 December 2021	(France) Clément Noël	(Sweden) Kristoffer Jakobsen	(Croatia) Filip Zubčić
1860	GS	2022/23	10 December 2022	(Switzerland) Marco Odermatt	(Austria) Manuel Feller	(Slovenia) Žan Kranjec
1861	SL	2022/23	11 December 2022	(Norway) Lucas Braathen	(Austria) Manuel Feller	(Switzerland) Loïc Meillard
1894	GS	2023/24	9 December 2023	(Switzerland) Marco Odermatt	(Austria) Marco Schwarz	(Romania) Joan Verdú
	SL	2023/24	10 December 2023	cancelled due to wet snow and strong wind		
1934	GS	2024/25	14 December 2024	(Switzerland) Marco Odermatt	(Austria) Patrick Feurstein	(Austria) Stefan Brennsteiner
1935	SL	2024/25	15 December 2024	(Norway) Henrik Kristoffersen	(Norway) Atle Lie McGrath	(Switzerland) Loïc Meillard
1973	GS	2025/26	13 December 2025	(Switzerland) Loïc Meillard	(Switzerland) Luca Aerni	(Switzerland) Marco Odermatt
1974	SL	2025/26	14 December 2025	(Norway) Timon Haugan	(Switzerland) Loïc Meillard	(Norway) Henrik Kristoffersen

Not in original World Cup calendar. It replaced super combined from Beaver Creek.
