= Alpine skiing at the 1992 Winter Olympics – Men's downhill =

Men's downhill at the XVI Olympic Winter Games
- Alpine skiing
- Venue: La face de Bellevarde; Val-d'Isère, France
- Date: 9 February 1992
- Competitors: 55 from 24 nations
- Winning time: 1:50.37

Medalists
1st place, gold medalist(s)		Patrick Ortlieb	Austria
2nd place, silver medalist(s)		Franck Piccard	France
3rd place, bronze medalist(s)		Günther Mader	Austria

Men's Downhill
- Location: La face de Bellevarde; Val d'Isère, France
- Vertical: 973 m (3,192 ft)
- Top elevation: 2,809 m (9,216 ft)
- Base elevation: 1,836 m (6,024 ft)
- Longest run: 3.048 km (1.894 mi)

The Men's Downhill competition of the Albertville 1992 Olympics was held at Val d'Isère on Sunday, 9 February.

The defending world champion was Franz Heinzer of Switzerland, who was also the defending World Cup downhill champion and led the current season. Defending Olympic champion Pirmin Zurbriggen of Switzerland had retired from competition two years earlier; this was the fourth consecutive Olympics without the defending champion in the field.

The race was run on a new course on La face de Bellevarde, designed by 1972 champion Bernhard Russi. Austria's Patrick Ortlieb, who had yet to win a World Cup event, won the gold medal; Franck Piccard of France was only 0.05 seconds back to take the silver, and the bronze medalist was Günther Mader of Austria. Ortlieb was first racer on the course, and he became the fifth Austrian to win the event, in its twelfth edition. Heinzer was sixth, more than a second back.

The course started at an elevation of 2,809 m (9,216 ft) above sea level with a vertical drop of 973 m (3,192 ft) and a course length of 3.048 km (1.89 mi). Ortlieb's winning time of 110.37 seconds yielded an average course speed of 99.418 km/h (61.8 mph), with an average vertical descent rate of 8.816 m/s (28.9 ft/s).

== Results ==
The race was started at 12:15 local time, (UTC +1). At the starting gate, the skies were clear, the temperature was 5.0 °C (41 °F), and the snow condition was hard; the temperature at the finish was lower, at 3.0 °C (37 °F).

Rank	Bib	Name	Country	Time	Difference
1st place, gold medalist(s)	1	Patrick Ortlieb	Austria	1:50.37	—
2nd place, silver medalist(s)	23	Franck Piccard	France	1:50.42	+0.05
3rd place, bronze medalist(s)	14	Günther Mader	Austria	1:50.47	+0.10
4	2	Markus Wasmeier	Germany	1:50.62	+0.25
5	6	Jan Einar Thorsen	Norway	1:50.79	+0.42
6	12	Franz Heinzer	Switzerland	1:51.39	+1.02
7	3	Hansjörg Tauscher	Germany	1:51.49	+1.12
8	5	Lasse Arnesen	Norway	1:51.63	+1.26
9	15	A J Kitt	United States	1:51.98	+1.61
10	22	Franco Colturi	Italy	1:52.07	+1.70
11	13	Kristian Ghedina	Italy	1:52.28	+1.91
12	16	Luc Alphand	France	1:52.34	+1.97
13	4	Daniel Mahrer	Switzerland	1:52.39	+2.02
14	30	Gianfranco Martin	Italy	1:52.48	+2.11
15	7	Xavier Gigandet	Switzerland	1:52.50	+2.13
16	28	Kyle Rasmussen	United States	1:52.71	+2.34
17	10	Helmut Höflehner	Austria	1:53.10	+2.73
18	26	Felix Belczyk	Canada	1:53.37	+3.00
19	11	Berni Huber	Germany	1:53.38	+3.01
20	21	Tommy Moe	United States	1:53.40	+3.03
21	34	Vitaly Andreyev	Unified Team	1:53.52	+3.15
22	33	Aleksey Maslov	Unified Team	1:53.68	+3.31
23	8	Brian Stemmle	Canada	1:53.77	+3.40
24	32	Konstantin Chistyakov	Unified Team	1:53.93	+3.56
25	39	Tsuyoshi Tomii	Japan	1:54.23	+3.86
26	37	Kjetil André Aamodt	Norway	1:54.24	+3.87
27	25	Denis Rey	France	1:54.28	+3.91
28	24	Reggie Crist	United States	1:54.54	+4.17
29	38	Martin Bell	Great Britain	1:54.83	+4.46
30	45	Ricardo Campo	Spain	1:54.89	+4.52
31	19	Boris Duncan	Great Britain	1:54.95	+4.58
32	40	Tom Stiansen	Norway	1:55.62	+5.25
33	35	Graham Bell	Great Britain	1:55.82	+5.45
34	41	Marián Bíreš	Czechoslovakia	1:56.21	+5.84
35	42	Paulo Oppliger	Chile	1:56.30	+5.93
36	36	Steven Lee	Australia	1:58.55	+8.18
37	50	Petar Dichev	Bulgaria	2:01.21	+10.84
38	48	Hubertus von Hohenlohe	Mexico	2:02.98	+12.61
39	54	Choi Yong-hee	South Korea	2:04.85	+14.48
40	47	Alexis Racloz	Chile	2:05.61	+15.24
41	46	Lothar Christian Munder	Brazil	2:07.34	+16.97
42	55	Emilian Focşeneanu	Romania	2:08.81	+18.44
43	51	Péter Kristály	Hungary	2:09.88	+19.51
44	56	Aurel Foiciuc	Romania	2:09.94	+19.57
45	52	Lamine Guèye	Senegal	2:12.84	+22.47
-	9	Leonhard Stock	Austria	DNF	-
-	17	Danilo Sbardellotto	Italy	DNF	-
-	18	Marc Girardelli	Luxembourg	DNF	-
-	20	Adrien Duvillard	France	DNF	-
-	27	Paul Accola	Switzerland	DNF	-
-	31	Roman Torn	Canada	DNF	-
-	43	Markus Foser	Liechtenstein	DNF	-
-	44	Nils Linneberg	Chile	DNF	-
-	53	Alphonse Gomis	Senegal	DNF	-
-	29	Cary Mullen	Canada	DQ	-
-	49	Pierre Kőszáli	Hungary	DNS	-
