= Alpine skiing at the 1992 Winter Olympics – Men's combined =

Men's combined at the XVI Olympic Winter Games
- Alpine skiing
- Venue: Val d'Isère
- Date: February 10–11, 1992
- Competitors: 66 from 27 nations
- Winning time: 14.58

Medalists
1st place, gold medalist(s)		Josef Polig	Italy
2nd place, silver medalist(s)		Gianfranco Martin	Italy
3rd place, bronze medalist(s)		Steve Locher	Switzerland

The Men's combined competition of the Albertville 1992 Olympics was held at Val d'Isère.

Luxembourg's Marc Girardelli was the defending World Cup combined champion.

== Results ==
Rank	Name	Country	Downhill		Slalom				Total
Rank	Name	Country	Time	Points	Run 1	Run 2	Total	Points	Total
1st place, gold medalist(s)	Josef Polig	Italy	1:45.78	8.26	51.27	50.89	1:42.16	6.32	14.58
2nd place, silver medalist(s)	Gianfranco Martin	Italy	1:45.48	5.20	50.16	52.60	1:42.76	9.70	14.90
3rd place, bronze medalist(s)	Steve Locher	Switzerland	1:46.53	15.90	49.90	51.54	1:41.44	2.26	18.16
4	Jean-Luc Crétier	France	1:46.25	13.05	49.67	52.42	1:42.09	5.92	18.97
5	Markus Wasmeier	Germany	1:45.91	9.58	52.29	52.86	1:45.15	23.19	32.77
6	Kristian Ghedina	Italy	1:46.65	17.12	52.43	52.48	1:44.91	21.83	38.95
7	Ole Kristian Furuseth	Norway	1:48.94	40.47	50.59	50.45	1:41.04	0.00	40.47
8	Xavier Gigandet	Switzerland	1:45.61	6.52	53.35	53.84	1:47.19	34.69	41.21
9	Takuya Ishioka	Japan	1:49.29	44.04	49.48	52.94	1:42.42	7.79	51.83
10	Lasse Arnesen	Norway	1:46.81	18.76	53.33	53.59	1:46.92	33.17	51.93
11	Jan Einar Thorsen	Norway	1:44.97	0.00	54.59	55.80	1:50.39	52.75	52.75
12	Rob Crossan	Canada	1:48.33	34.25	50.77	54.35	1:45.12	23.02	57.27
13	Jure Košir	Slovenia	1:49.60	47.20	51.32	51.95	1:43.27	12.58	59.78
14	Cary Mullen	Canada	1:47.47	25.48	52.65	54.93	1:47.58	36.89	62.37
15	Kiminobu Kimura	Japan	1:50.98	61.26	49.47	52.08	1:41.55	2.88	64.14
16	Kyle Rasmussen	United States	1:46.30	13.56	55.01	55.45	1:50.46	53.14	66.70
17	Jorge Pujol	Spain	1:50.64	57.80	50.40	53.17	1:43.57	14.27	72.07
18	Tommy Moe	United States	1:47.19	22.63	55.03	56.56	1:51.59	59.52	82.15
19	Steven Lee	Australia	1:46.64	17.02	55.76	57.34	1:53.10	68.03	85.05
20	Vitaly Andreyev	Unified Team	1:46.01	10.60	55.80	58.44	1:54.24	74.47	85.07
21	Paul Accola	Switzerland	1:45.73	7.75	56.08	59.71	1:55.79	83.21	90.96
22	Petar Dichev	Bulgaria	1:53.52	87.15	50.80	52.80	1:43.60	14.44	101.59
23	Ricardo Campo	Spain	1:49.20	43.12	55.64	56.30	1:51.94	61.49	104.61
24	Daniel Vogt	Liechtenstein	1:48.97	40.77	55.95	57.88	1:53.83	72.15	112.92
25	Martin Bell	Great Britain	1:47.48	25.59	57.24	60.86	1:58.10	96.24	121.83
26	Marcin Szafrański	Poland	1:50.60	57.39	56.55	57.90	1:54.45	75.65	133.04
27	Graham Bell	Great Britain	1:48.08	31.70	59.59	59.59	1:59.18	102.33	134.03
28	Sean Langmuir	Great Britain	1:54.61	98.26	53.55	55.30	1:48.85	44.06	142.32
29	Markus Foser	Liechtenstein	1:49.12	42.30	59.08	60.50	1:59.58	104.59	146.89
30	Achim Vogt	Liechtenstein	1:47.09	21.61	65.98	61.88	2:07.86	151.30	172.91
31	Franco Colturi	Italy	1:45.59	6.32	69.46	61.78	2:11.24	170.37	176.69
32	Choi Yong-Hee	South Korea	1:55.68	109.17	62.06	58.91	2:00.97	112.43	221.60
33	Pierre Kőszáli	Hungary	1:56.25	114.98	55.79	65.03	2:00.82	111.59	226.57
34	Alexis Racloz	Chile	1:54.02	92.25	63.49	62.91	2:06.40	143.06	235.31
35	Emilian Focşeneanu	Romania	1:59.94	152.60	58.16	60.04	1:58.20	96.81	249.41
36	Hubertus von Fürstenberg-von Hohenlohe	Mexico	1:55.95	111.92	63.45	63.68	2:07.13	147.18	259.10
37	Péter Kristály	Hungary	2:00.42	157.49	58.52	61.61	2:00.13	107.69	265.18
-	A J Kitt	United States	1:46.29	13.46	DNS	DNS	DNS	-	-
-	Hubert Strolz	Austria	1:46.54	16.00	48.08	DQ	DQ	-	-
-	William Besse	Switzerland	1:46.66	17.23	DNF	DNF	DNF	-	-
-	Stephan Eberharter	Austria	1:46.85	19.16	DNF	DNF	DNF	-	-
-	Rainer Salzgeber	Austria	1:47.59	26.71	DNF	DNF	DNF	-	-
-	Paulo Oppliger	Chile	1:47.74	28.24	DQ	DQ	DQ	-	-
-	Felix Belczyk	Canada	1:47.75	28.34	DNF	DNF	DNF	-	-
-	Konstantin Chistyakov	Unified Team	1:47.95	30.38	DNF	DNF	DNF	-	-
-	Jeff Olson	United States	1:48.29	33.84	DNF	DNF	DNF	-	-
-	Aleksey Maslov	Unified Team	1:48.53	36.29	DNS	DNS	DNS	-	-
-	Marián Bíreš	Czechoslovakia	1:49.61	47.30	DNF	DNF	DNF	-	-
-	Lyubomir Popov	Bulgaria	1:52.74	79.20	48.72	DNF	DNF	-	-
-	Mauricio Rotella	Chile	1:54.88	101.02	DNF	DNF	DNF	-	-
-	Hur Seung-Wook	South Korea	1:55.27	104.99	DNF	DNF	DNF	-	-
-	Lothar Christian Munder	Brazil	1:57.01	122.73	67.26	DNF	DNF	-	-
-	Aurel Foiciuc	Romania	1:57.91	131.90	DQ	DQ	DQ	-	-
-	Peter Jurko	Czechoslovakia	1:58.27	135.57	DNF	DNF	DNF	-	-
-	Igor Latinović	Yugoslavia	1:58.57	138.63	DNF	DNF	DNF	-	-
-	Edin Terzić	Yugoslavia	1:59.90	152.19	DNF	DNF	DNF	-	-
-	Alphonse Gomis	Senegal	2:00.56	158.92	DNF	DNF	DNF	-	-
-	Lamine Guèye	Senegal	2:02.38	177.47	DNS	DNS	DNS	-	-
-	Zoran Perušina	Yugoslavia	2:14.19	297.85	DNF	DNF	DNF	-	-
-	Marc Girardelli	Luxembourg	DNF	-	-	-	-	-	-
-	Günther Mader	Austria	DNF	-	-	-	-	-	-
-	Boris Duncan	Great Britain	DNF	-	-	-	-	-	-
-	Tom Stiansen	Norway	DNF	-	-	-	-	-	-
-	Abraham Fernández	Spain	DNF	-	-	-	-	-	-
-	Denis Rey	France	DQ	-	-	-	-	-	-
-	Adrien Duvillard	France	DQ	-	-	-	-	-	-
