= Senegal at the 1994 Winter Olympics =

- IOC code: SEN
- NOC: Comité National Olympique et Sportif Sénégalais

in Lillehammer
- Competitors: 1 in 1 sport
- Flag bearer: Lamine Guèye
- Medals: Gold 0 Silver 0 Bronze 0 Total 0

Winter Olympics appearances (overview)
- 1984; 1988; 1992; 1994; 1998–2002; 2006; 2010; 2014–2022; 2026

Senegal competed at the 1994 Winter Olympics in Lillehammer, Norway. The country's appearance marked the third time it had competed at a Winter Olympics, and the last of three appearances at Winter Games by alpine skier Lamine Guèye. The delegation consisted solely of Guèye, who did not win any medals.

== Background ==
Senegal participated in three Winter Olympics between its debut at the 1984 Winter Olympics in Sarajevo, Yugoslavia, and the 1994 Winter Olympics in Lillehammer, Norway. No Senegalese athlete had ever won a medal at a Winter Games. In their first appearance, the country was represented by a single alpine skier, Lamine Guèye, while in 1992, fellow skier Alphonse Gomis also competed in addition to Guèye.

As in 1984, Senegal sent Guèye as their sole athlete at the 1994 Lillehammer Games. However, this was not intended as they had wished to send a second skier but following changes to the qualification standards by the International Olympic Committee, they were unable to do so. These changes also meant that Guèye was limited to a single event, the downhill.

== Competitors ==
The following is the list of number of competitors in the Games.

Sport	Men	Women	Total
Alpine skiing	1	0	1
Total	1	0	1

== Alpine skiing ==
Competing in the men's downhill, the sole Senegalese athlete, Lamine Guèye's event started on 13 February at the ski resort at Kvitfjell in Ringebu Municipality. The gold medal was won by American Tommy Moe with a time of 1.45:75; less than a second separated the top 15 competitors. Guèye was one of four skiers who failed to finish the course, alongside Cary Mullen of Canada, Franz Heinzer of Switzerland and Connor O'Brien of Estonia. Following the Games, Guèye became a spokesman against the qualification standards imposed on the Games, with his book Skieur Senegalais Cherche Esprit Olympique (Senegalese Skier Seeks Olympic Spirit).

Skiing events

Athlete	Event	Final		
Athlete	Event	Run 1	Total	Rank
Lamine Guèye	Men's downhill	Did not finish		
