= 1993 Alpine Skiing World Cup – Men's combined =

1993 Men's combined World Cup
Previous: 1992	Next: 1994

Men's combined World Cup 1992/1993

== Final point standings ==
In men's combined World Cup 1992/93 all three results count. Marc Girardelli won his third Combined World Cup by winning all three competitions.

Place	Name	Country	Total points	14 (Germany)	19 (Austria)	23 (Switzerland)
1	Marc Girardelli	Luxembourg	300	100	100	100
2	Günther Mader	Austria	200	60	80	60
3	Kjetil André Aamodt	Norway	160	80	-	80
4	Steve Locher	Switzerland	131	36	45	50
5	Hubert Strolz	Austria	105	45	60	-
6	Patrick Ortlieb	Austria	90	18	40	32
7	Adrien Duvillard	France	82	32	50	-
	Rainer Salzgeber	Austria	82	26	20	36
9	Lasse Kjus	Norway	70	50	-	20
10	Stephan Eberharter	Austria	69	29	-	40
11	Gianfranco Martin	Italy	57	15	24	18
12	Lasse Arnesen	Norway	56	20	36	-
13	Markus Wasmeier	Germany	55	-	26	29
14	Bruno Kernen	Switzerland	45	-	-	45
15	A. J. Kitt	United States	44	-	18	26
16	Dietmar Thöni	Austria	40	40	-	-
17	Cary Mullen	Canada	39	-	15	24
18	William Besse	Switzerland	32	-	32	-
19	Asgeir Linberg	Norway	30	14	16	-
20	Kristian Ghedina	Italy	29	-	29	-
21	Martin Fiala	Germany	24	24	-	-
	Kyle Rasmussen	United States	24	13	11	-
23	Luc Alphand	France	22	22	-	-
	Josef Polig	Italy	22	-	22	-
	Hannes Trinkl	Austria	22	-	-	22
26	Lionel Finance	France	16	16	-	-
	Patrik Järbyn	Sweden	16	-	-	16
28	Tommy Moe	United States	14	-	14	-
29	Daniel Caduff	Switzerland	13	-	13	-
30	Alberto Senigagliesi	Italy	12	12	-	-
	Tom Stiansen	Norway	12	-	12	-
32	Attila Bónis	Hungary	11	11	-	-
33	Marcin Szafrański	Poland	10	-	10	-
34	Szymon Kraciuk	Poland	9	-	9	-

Note:

In all races not all points were awarded (not enough finishers).

Alpine Skiing World Cup
Men

Overall | Downhill | Super G | Giant slalom | Slalom | Combined

1993
