= Senegal at the 1992 Winter Olympics =

- IOC code: SEN
- NOC: Comité National Olympique et Sportif Sénégalais

in Albertville
- Competitors: 2 in 1 sport
- Flag bearer: Lamine Guèye
- Medals: Gold 0 Silver 0 Bronze 0 Total 0

Winter Olympics appearances (overview)
- 1984; 1988; 1992; 1994; 1998–2002; 2006; 2010; 2014–2026

Senegal competed at the 1992 Winter Olympics in Albertville, France. The country returned after missing the 1988 games and marked the second time it had competed at a Winter Olympics. This was the first time the country has entered more than a single athlete, with skiers Lamine Guèye and Alphonse Gomis both taking part. The lack of support staff meant that Guèye sought medical assistance from another team. Neither competitors won a medal, and Gomis was noted by the media for the number of falls he had on the slopes.

== Background ==
Senegal made their Winter Olympic debut at the 1984 Winter Games in Sarajevo, Yugoslavia. This followed a campaign by alpine skier Lamine Guèye, who as a teenager, had also founded the country's ski federation. At those Games, Guèye had become the first black African to compete at the Winter Olympics. Following the Sarajevo Games, Guèye retired temporarily from competing professionally and instead took up employment as a model and an actor, in addition to earning a living in the finance sector.

Upon viewing the performance of the Jamaican bobsleigh team at the 1988 Winter Olympics in Calgary, Alberta, Canada, Guèye decided to return to the Olympics once again. He maintained that he had a hard time explaining the sport to his fellow countrymen, saying "I have to tell the people what snow is, what skis are, I have to tell them what big mountains are. They don't have any reference on these things." Joining Guèye at the 1992 Winter Olympics in Albertville, France, and becoming the second Senegalese athlete to compete at a Winter Games, was ski instructor Alphonse Gomis, who resides in Tignes, near Albertville. As at the 1984 Winter Games, Guèye was Senegal's flagbearer during the Parade of Nations in the opening ceremony. No support staff were sent with the skiers, so that when Guèye injured his back, a doctor from the American team treated him.

== Competitors ==
The following is the list of number of competitors in the Games.

Sport	Men	Women	Total
Alpine skiing	2	0	2
Total	2	0	2

== Alpine skiing ==
Both the members of the Senegalese team at the 1992 Winter Olympics, Lamine Guèye and Alphonse Gomis, took part in the same skiing events; the men's downhill, super-G, giant slalom, slalom and the combined competition.

The first event to take place was the downhill, on 9 February. This consisted of a single run each; Guèye finished in last position with a time of 2:12.84, over 22 seconds behind Patrick Ortlieb of Austria who took the gold medal. Gomis was one of nine skiers who failed to complete their run, the first of several incomplete runs by the ski instructor during the course of the Games. This would later be referred to by The Washington Post as a "world-class agony-of-defeat spill". His performances were referenced by The Record as "Gomis was the one you may have seen on the highlights, doing unplanned cartwheels, nosedives, and slides down the hill".

Over the next two days, the combined event took place. Neither skier from Senegal finished their runs. The Super-G competition took place on 16 February, with an improved standing for Guèye, who finished 78th out of the 93 skiers who completed the course with a time of 1:29.18. Gomis did not finish.

The giant slalom was next, on 18 February, and was the only event in which both skiers completed the course. Guèye recorded a time of 2:44.98 in 66th place, while Gomis completed the run in 74th place with a time of 2:48.08. Both were some distance behind the winner, Alberto Tomba of Italy who had a time of 2:06.98. The duo's final event was the slalom, on 22 February. Both were among the 52 skiers who failed to complete their runs in the competition.

The 1992 Winter Olympics were the last Winter Games to be run before the introduction of more strenuous qualification standards. This meant that at the 1994 Winter Olympics, Senegal was unable to field a second skier, and Guèye would be limited to competing in a single event.

Key

- N/A = Round not applicable for the event

Skiing events

Athlete	Event	Run 1 (DH)		Run 2 (Sl)		Run 3 (Sl)		Final/Total		
Athlete	Event	Time	Rank	Time	Rank	Time	Rank	Time	Diff	Rank
Alphonse Gomis	Downhill	—N/a						Did not finish		
Alphonse Gomis	Super-G	—N/a						Did not finish		
Alphonse Gomis	Giant slalom	1:24.29	89	1:23.79	74	—N/a		2:48.08	+41.10	74
Alphonse Gomis	Slalom	Did not finish				—N/a		Did not finish		
Alphonse Gomis	Combined	2:00.56	57	Did not finish						
Lamine Guèye	Downhill	—N/a						2:12.84	+22.47	45
Lamine Guèye	Super-G	—N/a						1:29.18	+16.14	78
Lamine Guèye	Giant slalom	1:21.60	77	1:23.38	71	—N/a		2:44.98	+38.00	66
Lamine Guèye	Slalom	1:10.90	60	Did not finish		—N/a		Did not finish		
Lamine Guèye	Combined	2:00.38	58	Did not finish						
