= Senegal at the 2010 Winter Olympics =

- IOC code: SEN
- NOC: Comité National Olympique et Sportif Sénégalais

in Vancouver
- Competitors: 1 in 1 sport
- Flag bearer: Leyti Seck
- Medals: Gold 0 Silver 0 Bronze 0 Total 0

Winter Olympics appearances (overview)
- 1984; 1988; 1992; 1994; 1998–2002; 2006; 2010; 2014–2022; 2026

Senegal participated at the 2010 Winter Olympics in Vancouver, British Columbia, Canada. The country's participation at the Games marked its fifth at the Winter Olympic Games. As in 2006 Olympics, Senegal's sole athlete was Leyti Seck, an alpine skier. He was also the nation's flag bearer in the Parade of Nations. Seck did not win any medals, although he finished ahead of fellow African Samir Azzimani of Morocco in the giant slalom.

== Background ==
Senegal participated in five Winter Olympics between its debut at the 1984 Winter Olympics in Sarajevo, Yugoslavia, and the 2010 Winter Olympics in Vancouver, British Columbia, Canada. No Senegalese athlete had ever won a medal at a Winter Games. In two out of the three initial appearances, the country was represented by a single alpine skier, Lamine Guèye, with the exception of 1992 when Alphonse Gomis also competed. In 2006, fellow skier Leyti Seck was the national team's sole athlete.

Seck, a German-born athlete of dual Austrian/Senegalese nationality, finished in 55th place in the super-G at the 2006 Games, but not finishing in the Men's slalom or giant slalom. For the 2010 Games, he was once again named as his nation's flag bearer in the Parade of Nations during the opening ceremony.

== Alpine skiing ==
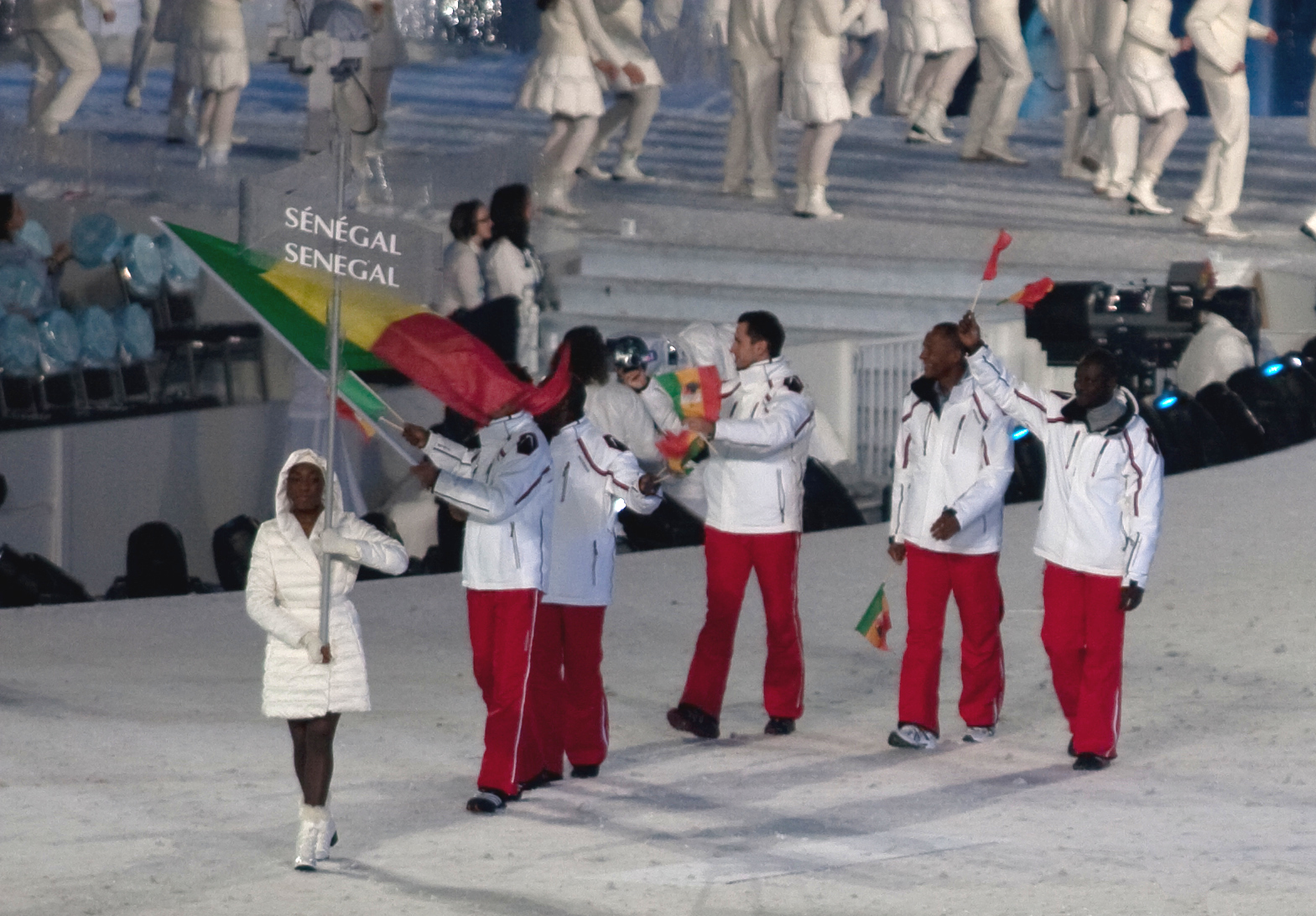
The Senegal team entering the stadium during the Parade of Nations

The sole Senegalese athlete at the Games, Leyti Seck, competed in both the men's giant slalom and men's slalom. He was one of three African skiers at the Vancouver Olympics, alongside Kwame Nkrumah-Acheampong from Ghana and Samir Azzimani of Morocco.

Seck failed to complete his first run of the slalom, and so did not take part in a second run. For the giant slalom, he recorded times of 1:32.32 and 1:33.82, finishing some 28.31 combined seconds behind the gold medalist, Carlo Janka of Switzerland, but one place ahead of Azzimani. Speaking after he completed his run, Seck said "I'm happy that I finished".

Key

- DNF = Did not finish

Skiing events

Athlete	Event	Run 1	Run 2	Total	Rank
Leyti Seck	Men's slalom	DNF	did not advance		
Leyti Seck	Men's giant slalom	1:32.32	1:33.82	3:06.14	73
