= Senegal at the 2006 Winter Olympics =

- IOC code: SEN
- NOC: Comité National Olympique et Sportif Sénégalais

in Turin
- Competitors: 1 (1 man) in 1 sport
- Flag bearers: Leyti Seck (opening); Lamine Guèye (closing)
- Medals: Gold 0 Silver 0 Bronze 0 Total 0

Winter Olympics appearances (overview)
- 1984; 1988; 1992; 1994; 1998–2002; 2006; 2010; 2014–2022; 2026

Senegal competed at the 2006 Winter Olympics in Turin, Italy. This marked the fourth appearance by the nation at a Winter Olympics, and the first time it had not been represented at one by alpine skier Lamine Guèye. Instead, Leyti Seck was chosen as the country's sole representative. He did not win any medals, but would return to represent his country again at the 2010 Winter Olympics.

== Background ==
Senegal participated in four Winter Olympics between its debut at the 1984 Winter Olympics in Sarajevo, Yugoslavia, and the 2006 Winter Olympics in Turin, Italy. No Senegalese athlete had ever won a medal at a Winter Games. In two out of the three initial appearances, the country was represented by a single alpine skier, Lamine Guèye, with the exception of 1992 when Alphonse Gomis also competed.

Following a break of two Games, Senegal once again sent an athlete to the Winter Olympics in 2006. This was the first time Senegal had fielded a Winter Games team which did not feature Guèye. Instead, alpine skier Leyti Seck was chosen as the country's sole representative, who had been competing professionally since 2002. He had been brought to the attention of Guèye, who was the head of the Senegalese Ski Federation. Seck was chosen as the flagbearer for the Parade of Nations in the opening ceremony, while Guèye returned as flagbearer for the closing ceremony.

== Alpine skiing ==
The sole Senegalese athlete at the Games, Leyti Seck, competed in the men's super-G, giant slalom and slalom. In the super-G on 18 February, Seck finished in 55th place out of the 56 skiers who completed the run with a time of 1:42.87, ahead of Erjon Tola of Albania at the 2006 Winter Olympics. However, he failed to complete his remaining two events, becoming one of the 40 skiers who did not finish the giant slalom on 20 February, and one of the 44 who did not finish the slalom on 25 February. Seck would go on to compete once again for Senegal at the 2010 Winter Olympics.

Key

- N/A = Round not applicable for the event

Skiing events

Athlete	Event	Final				
Athlete	Event	Run 1	Run 2	Run 3	Total	Rank
Leyti Seck	Men's super-G	n/a			1:42.87	55
Leyti Seck	Men's giant slalom	did not finish				
Leyti Seck	Men's slalom	did not finish				
