= Czifra =

Czifra is a Hungarian surname. Notable people with the surname include:

- Bettina Lili Czifra (born 2007), Hungarian artistic gymnast
- Kathalin Czifra (born 1972), Hungarian biathlete
