= Fabrice Pannekoucke =

French politician (born 1975)

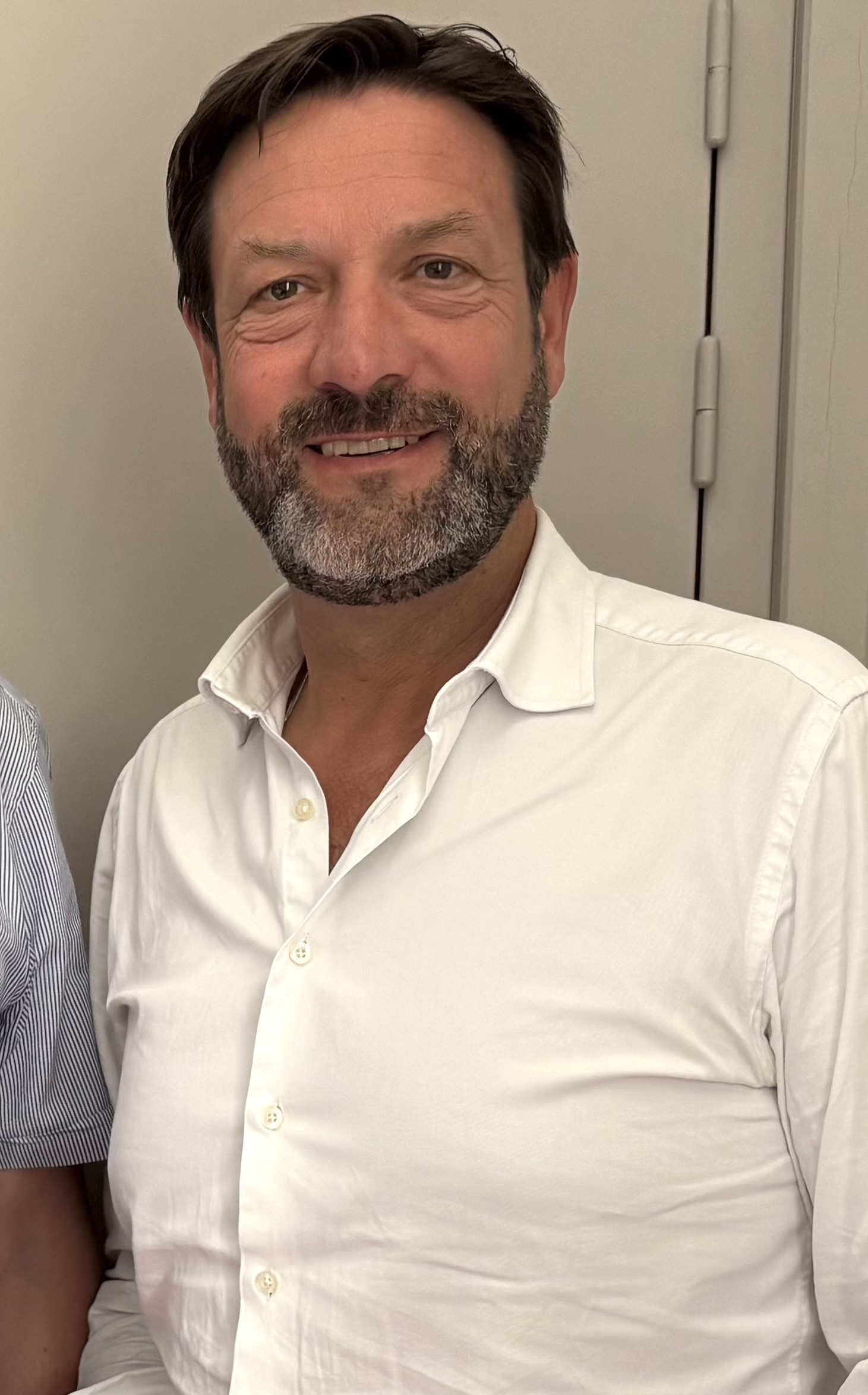
- Pannekoucke in 2025

President of the Regional Council of Auvergne-Rhône-Alpes
- Incumbent
- Assumed office 5 September 2024
- Preceded by: Laurent Wauquiez

Member of the Regional Council of Auvergne-Rhône-Alpes
- Incumbent
- Assumed office 4 January 2016

Mayor of Moûtiers
- In office 3 April 2014 – 18 September 2024
- Preceded by: Philippe Nivelle
- Succeeded by: Chantal Martin

Mayor of Saint-Jean-de-Belleville
- In office 18 March 2001 – 3 April 2014
- Preceded by: Antoine Roux-Vollon
- Succeeded by: Donatienne Thomas

Personal details
- Born: 14 May 1975 (age 50) Malo-les-Bains, France
- Party: Rally for the Republic (until 2002); Union for a Popular Movement (2002–2015); The Republicans (2015–present)

Fabrice Pannekoucke (French pronunciation: [fabʁis pan(ə)kuk]; born 14 May 1975) is a French politician who has served as President of the Regional Council of Auvergne-Rhône-Alpes since 2024. A member of The Republicans (LR), he previously served as Mayor of Saint-Jean-de-Belleville from 2001 to 2014 and as Mayor of Moûtiers from 2014 to 2024.

At the 2026 Winter Olympics closing ceremony, he and Renaud Muselier received the Olympic flag, marking the handover to the next Winter Games host country.
