= Senegal at the 1984 Winter Olympics =

- IOC code: SEN
- NOC: Comité National Olympique et Sportif Sénégalais

in Sarajevo
- Competitors: 1 (man) in 1 sport
- Flag bearer: Lamine Guèye
- Medals: Gold 0 Silver 0 Bronze 0 Total 0

Winter Olympics appearances (overview)
- 1984; 1988; 1992; 1994; 1998–2002; 2006; 2010; 2014–2026

Senegal competed in the 1984 Winter Olympics in Sarajevo, Yugoslavia. The country's participation at the Games marked its Winter Olympics debut, although it had competed in the Summer Olympics since 1964. The delegation consisted of a single alpine skier, Lamine Guèye, who did not win any medals. This was the first time a black African competed at the Winter Olympics, and Guèye would later return to the Winter Games twice more in 1992 and 1994.

== Background ==
Senegal first competed in the Summer Olympics at the 1964 Games in Tokyo, Japan. They participated on five occasions prior to the 1984 Winter Olympics, where they made their Winter Games debut in Sarajevo, Yugoslavia. They sent a single alpine skier, Lamine Guèye. Several other countries made their Winter Olympic debut in 1984; Puerto Rico, Monaco, the United States Virgin Islands and fellow African nation Egypt.

Guèye had arranged for the creation of the Senegalese Ski Federation in 1979, and had initially expected to be unable to compete at the 1984 Olympics due to the qualification requirements and as he was recovering from an injury, but was informed by the International Olympic Committee several months prior that he would be allowed to represent Senegal. Guèye was the first black African to compete at the Winter Games; South Africa became the first African nation to compete at a Winter Games, in 1960, but with an all-white team under apartheid.

== Alpine skiing ==
The sole Senegalese athlete at the Games, Lamine Guèye, competed in the men's downhill and giant slalom. He compared arriving at the athletes village to being a "kid in Disneyland", and said that he was welcomed by everyone at the Games. He entered the stadium during the Parade of Nations in the opening ceremony as the Senegalese flag bearer sandwiched between the United States and the Soviet Union, the two largest delegations.

In the downhill, Guèye finished his run with a time of 1:59.64, in 45th place. He registered times of 1:42.63 and 1:46.04 in the giant slalom, finishing in 57th place. He later said that "We have no word for downhill in Senegalese because we have no mountains. I was so afraid I almost threw up. I have fully tested the safety measures and can tell you that they work."

Following the Games, Guèye felt that his Olympic career was over and did not compete at the 1988 Winter Games. He was inspired watching the Jamaican bobsled team on television, and returned to the Winter Olympics for both the 1992 and 1994 Games. He later became a spokesman against the qualification standards imposed on the Games, with his book Skieur Senegalais Cherche Esprit Olympique (Senegalese Skier Seeks Olympic Spirit).

Key

- N/A = Round not applicable for the event

Skiing events

| Athlete | Event | Race 1 | | Race 2 | | Total | |
| Athlete | Event | Time | Rank | Time | Rank | Time | Rank |
|---|---|---|---|---|---|---|---|
| Lamine Guèye | Downhill | 1:59.64 | 51 | N/A | | 1:59.64 | 51 |
| Lamine Guèye | Giant slalom | 1:42.63 | 60 | 1:46.04 | 57 | 3:28.67 | 57 |
