= Leyti Seck =

Senegalese alpine skier

Personal information
- Nationality: Senegal
- Born: 21 January 1981 (age 45) Munich, West Germany

Sport
- Sport: Skiing

Achievements and titles
- Personal best: Slalom: 1:21.53
- Updated on 16 October 2016

Leyti Alexander Seck (born 21 January 1981) is a Senegalese alpine skier. He holds dual Austrian/Senegalese nationality. He competed on the international skiing circuit after turning professional in 2002, and competed for Senegal at both the 2006 and 2010 Winter Olympics.

== Early life ==
Leyti Seck was born on 21 January 1981. His mother was Austrian, while his father was from Senegal. He was adopted as a child, and grew up in Strobl am Wolfgangsee, 30 miles (48 km) east of Salzburg. Seck has dual Senegalese and Austrian nationality.

He was introduced to skiing at the age of seven and turned professional in 2002. Seck had been inspired by a Kuwaiti competitor at the skiing World Championships. He was brought to the attention of Lamine Guèye, who skied for Senegal at the 1994 Winter Olympics, and had since founded his nation's ski federation. Seck was initially banned by the International Ski Federation for wearing an anti-racism logo on his ski helmet, but successfully fought the ban.

== Biography ==
Seck competed in the 2003 Alpine Skiing World Cup, where he finished 61st in the giant slalom, with a time of 3:09.35. This placed him ahead of reigning Olympic gold medallist Jean-Pierre Vidal, and brought him to the attention of the Austrian skiing team, with whom he began to train. Christian Mayer said of Seck, "He has amazing talent, I was really surprised at his performance."

In the 2004 Cup, he failed to finish the slalom; he did not qualify for the 2005 Cup. Seck took part in the 2005 Alpine skiing world championships, failing to complete the slalom, and finished 54th in the giant slalom with a time of 133.56. In the 2006 Alpine Skiing World Cup, Seck took part in the slalom, which he again failed to complete.

Seck was Senegal's only representative at the 2006 Winter Olympics in Turin, Italy. He finished 55th in the Men's super-G, with a time of 1:42.87, but failed to finish the slalom and giant slalom events. His best result to date came at the Mitterfirmiansreut in Germany in 2006, where he finished fifth in the slalom with a time of 1:21.53.

He was scheduled to compete at the 2007 Alpine skiing world championships, but Senegal withdrew, reportedly with Seck's consent, in protest against new qualification rules imposed by the International Ski Federation to scale down the number of competitors. Seck competed in the 2007 Alpine Skiing World Cup but failed to complete. Seck competed once again for Senegal at the 2010 Winter Olympics, in Vancouver, Canada. He did not finish in the men's slalom, and placed 73rd overall in the giant slalom.

== See also ==
- Philip Boit
- Isaac Menyoli

Olympic Games
Preceded by Malick Fall	Flagbearer for Senegal; 2006 Turin	Succeeded by Bineta Diedhiou
Preceded by Bineta Diedhiou	Flagbearer for Senegal; 2010 Vancouver	Succeeded by Ndiss Kaba Badji
