= Saint-Martin-de-Belleville =

- Part of Les Belleville
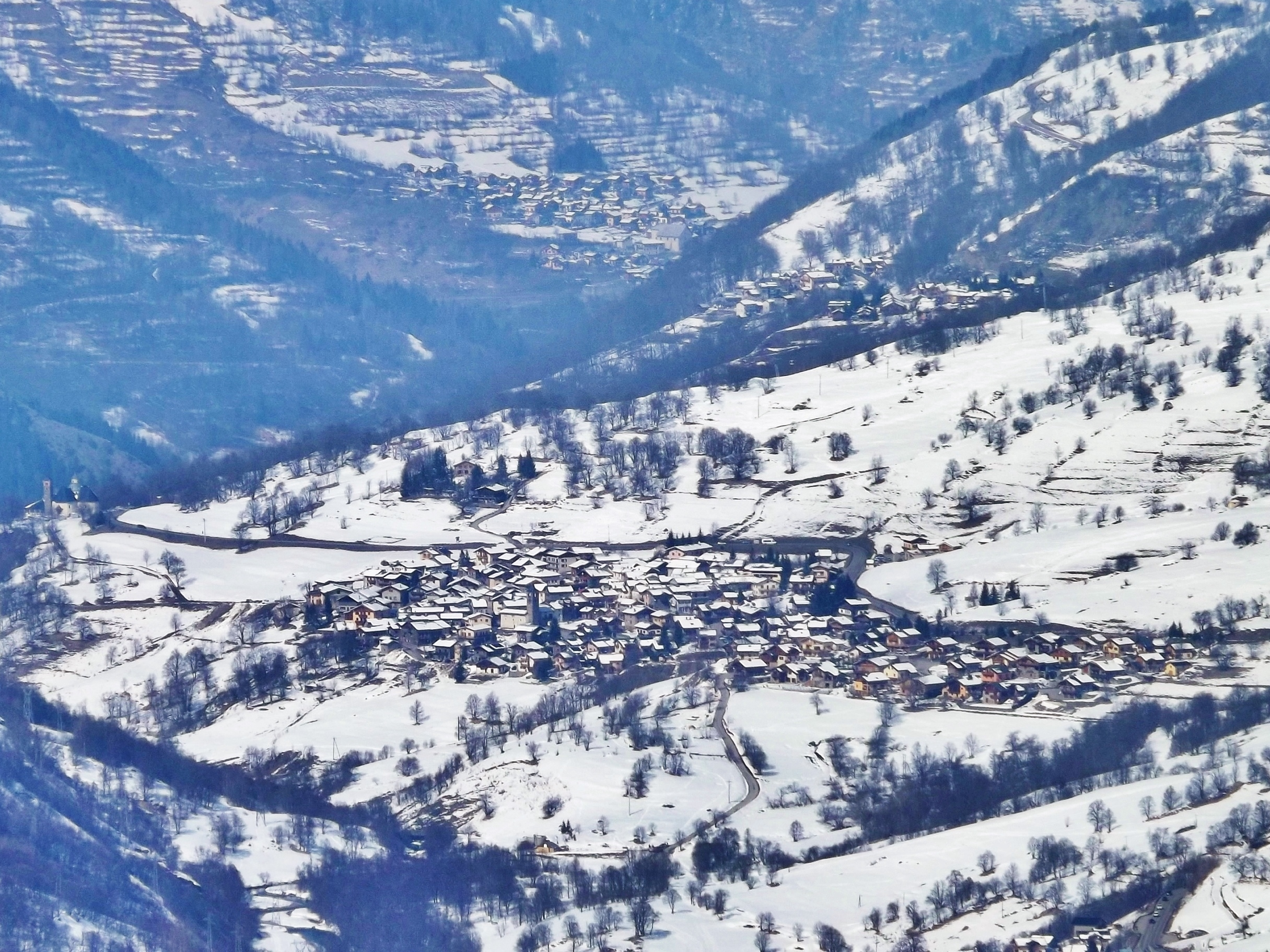
- Panorama from Val Thorens of the village, with Notre-Dame-de-la-Vie sanctuary visible on the left

- Coat of arms
- Location of Saint-Martin-de-Belleville
- Location within France Location within Auvergne-Rhône-Alpes
- Coordinates: 45°22′52″N 6°30′19″E
- Country: France
- Region: Auvergne-Rhône-Alpes
- Department: Savoie
- Arrondissement: Albertville
- Canton: Moûtiers
- Commune: Les Belleville
- Area^{1}: 161.79 km^{2} (62.47 sq mi)
- Elevation: 1,400 m (4,600 ft)
- Highest elevation: 3,564 m (11,693 ft)
- Lowest elevation: 640 m (2,100 ft)
- Population (2022): 2,613
  - Density: 16.15/km^{2} (41.83/sq mi)
- Time zone: UTC+01:00 (CET)
  - Summer (DST): UTC+02:00 (CEST)
- Postal code: 73440
- ^{1} French Land Register data, which excludes lakes, ponds, glaciers > 1 km^{2} (0.386 sq mi or 247 acres) and river estuaries.

Saint-Martin-de-Belleville (French pronunciation: [sɛ̃ maʁtɛ̃ d(ə) bɛlvil]) is a former commune in the Savoie department in the Auvergne-Rhône-Alpes region in Southeastern France. On 1 January 2016, it was merged into the new commune of Les Belleville.

Saint-Martin-de-Belleville is home to one of the best restaurants in the French Alps, the 2 Michelin starred La Bouitte.

== Ski ==
The Saint-Martin-de-Belleville ski area is part of the Three Valleys ski area that includes the resorts of Les Menuires, Val Thorens, Meribel, Courchevel and La Tania. In total the area has 600 km of posted runs and 200 ski lifts.

== Summer ==
Saint-Martin has also in the past few years increased its publicity of the area for summer visitors. All of the winter brochures now include a section on the summer season that runs most years from 30 June until 1 September. The 3 Valleys links are open on a Tuesday and a Thursday for mountain biking and walking.

== Transportation ==
If travelling there the nearest airports (closest first) are:

- Annecy
- Chambéry
- Grenoble
- Geneva
- Lyon

== Notable residents ==
- Vincent Jay - Olympic Biathlete who won Gold and Bronze at Vancouver 2010

== See also ==
- Communes of the Savoie department
