= Nils Gelbjerg-Hansen =

Danish alpine skier (born 1968)

Personal information
- Nationality: Danish
- Born: 7 October 1968 (age 56); Copenhagen, Denmark

Sport
- Sport: Alpine skiing

Nils Gelbjerg-Hansen (born 7 October 1968) is a Danish alpine skier. He competed in two events at the 1992 Winter Olympics.
