= Robert Scott Detlof =

Brazilian alpine skier (born 1961)

Personal information
- Nationality: Brazilian
- Born: 6 May 1961 (age 63)

Sport
- Sport: Alpine skiing

Robert Scott Detlof (born 6 May 1961) is a Brazilian alpine skier. He competed in the men's slalom at the 1992 Winter Olympics.
