= Allaoua Latef =

Algerian alpine skier (born 1971)

Personal information
- Nationality: Algerian
- Born: 17 December 1971 (age 53)

Sport
- Sport: Alpine skiing

Allaoua Latef (born 17 December 1971) is an Algerian alpine skier. He competed in the men's slalom at the 1992 Winter Olympics.
