= Bineta Diédhiou =

Senegalese taekwondo practitioner

Medal record

Representing Senegal

Women's taekwondo

World Championships
Bronze medal – third place	2005 Madrid	Featherweight

Bineta Diedhiou (born 8 January 1986) is a Senegalese Taekwondo athlete. She won the bronze medal in featherweight (- 59 kg) at the 2005 World Taekwondo Championships in Madrid. Diedhiou carried Senegal's flag at the 2008 Summer Olympics Opening Ceremony.

Olympic Games
Preceded by Leyti Seck	Flagbearer for Senegal; 2008 Beijing	Succeeded by Leyti Seck
