= Annamária Bónis =

Hungarian alpine skier (born 1974)

Personal information
- Nationality: Hungarian
- Born: 5 February 1974 (age 51); Miercurea Ciuc, Romania

Sport
- Sport: Alpine skiing

Annamária Bónis (born 5 February 1974) is a Hungarian alpine skier. She competed in three events at the 1992 Winter Olympics. At the Albertville Games, she competed in three alpine skiing events - she placed 43rd in the supergiant, placed 34th in the giant slalom, and did not finish the slalom and was not classified.
