= Villarlurin =

Villarlurin Vlolèrin (Arpitan)
- Part of Les Belleville
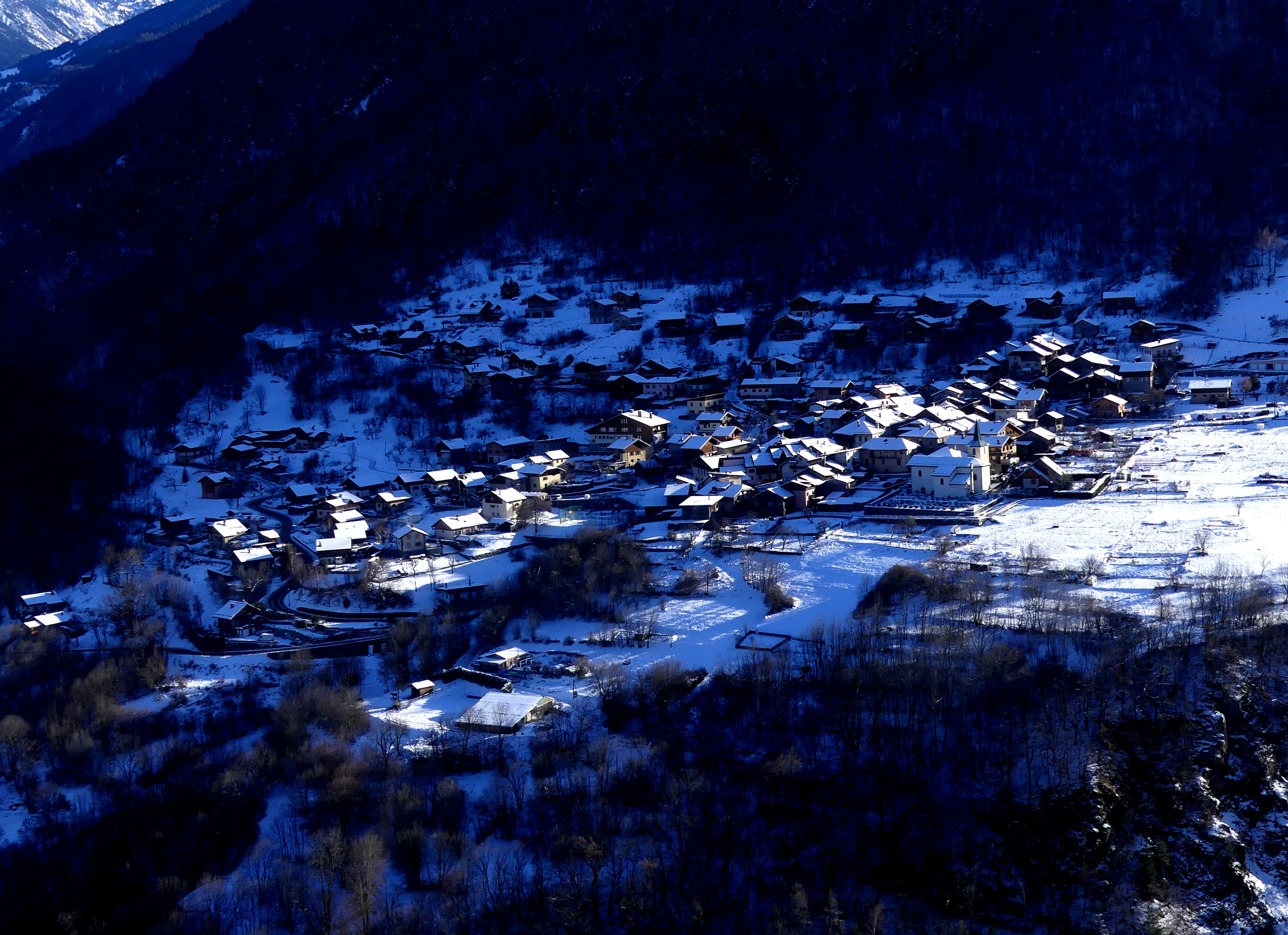
- Location of Villarlurin
- Location within France Location within Auvergne-Rhône-Alpes
- Coordinates: 45°27′45″N 6°31′41″E
- Country: France
- Region: Auvergne-Rhône-Alpes
- Department: Savoie
- Arrondissement: Albertville
- Canton: Moûtiers
- Commune: Les Belleville
- Area^{1}: 5.45 km^{2} (2.10 sq mi)
- Highest elevation: 1,564 m (5,131 ft)
- Lowest elevation: 509 m (1,670 ft)
- Population (2022): 314
  - Density: 57.6/km^{2} (149/sq mi)
- Time zone: UTC+01:00 (CET)
  - Summer (DST): UTC+02:00 (CEST)
- Postal code: 73600
- Website: www.villarlurin.fr
- ^{1} French Land Register data, which excludes lakes, ponds, glaciers > 1 km^{2} (0.386 sq mi or 247 acres) and river estuaries.

Villarlurin (French pronunciation: [vilaʁlyʁɛ̃]; Arpitan: Vlolèrin) is a former commune in the Savoie department in the Auvergne-Rhône-Alpes region in Southeastern France. On 1 January 2016, it was merged into the new commune of Les Belleville.

Lying within the commune lays Saint Roch church, built between the years of 1870 - 1871. Later being dedicated to Saint Rochafter 1874.

== See also ==
- Communes of the Savoie department
