= Vera Gönczi =

Hungarian alpine skier (born 1969)

Personal information
- Nationality: Hungarian
- Born: 18 October 1969 (age 55); Budapest, Hungary

Sport
- Sport: Alpine skiing

Vera Gönczi (born 18 October 1969) is a Hungarian alpine skier. She competed in three events at the 1992 Winter Olympics.
