= Juan-Carlos Elizondo =

Mexican alpine skier (born 1975)

Personal information
- Nationality: Mexican
- Born: 2 October 1975 (age 49)

Sport
- Sport: Alpine skiing

Juan-Carlos Elizondo (born 2 October 1975) is a Mexican alpine skier. He competed in the men's slalom at the 1992 Winter Olympics.
