= Les Menuires =

Ski resort in France

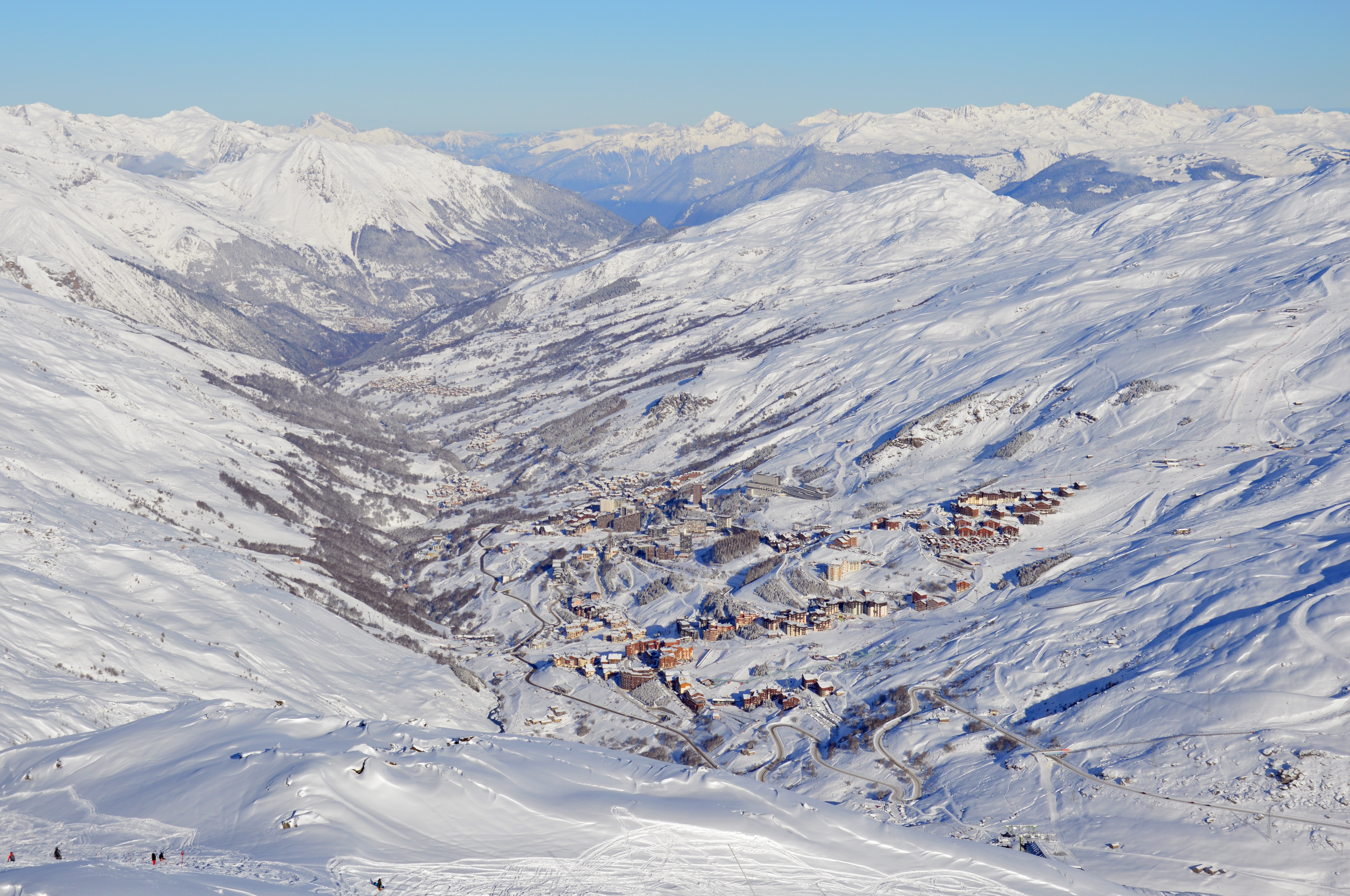
- Overview of Les Menuires

- Location within Alps
- Location: Les Belleville, Savoie, France
- Nearest city: Chambéry
- Coordinates: 45°19′28″N 6°32′15″E
- Top elevation: 2,850 m (9,350 ft)
- Base elevation: 1,450 m (4,760 ft)
- Trails: 76 (12 green, 34 blue, 24 red & 6 black)
- Lift system: 33 (Capacity 55,939ph)
- Website: lesmenuires.com

Les Menuires (French pronunciation: [le mənɥiʁ]) is a ski resort in the Belleville valley of Les Trois Vallées between Saint-Martin-de-Belleville and Val Thorens. Owned and operated by Compagnie des Alpes, it is in the Savoie département of France.

The resort has 48 restaurants, 39 ski lifts and 62 trails. The resort has advanced ski slopes and beginner slopes. The resort also hosted the men's slalom alpine skiing event at the 1992 Winter Olympics. Its slopes are connected to more than 600 km of slopes in Les Trois Vallées, making it a part of the largest skiable area in the world. The resort has not only skiing facilities, but also offers a range of other activities.

The resort was founded in 1964 and has an altitude range of 1,850 m (6,070 ft).

One of the highest ski runs is on the Pointe de la Masse.

== History ==
During the 1950s, Service of the Study and Development of Mountain Tourism (SEATM) was created by the local authorities to create the ski resort of Courchevel. Due to its great success, in the 1960s the mayor of Saint-Martin-de-Belleville decided to follow suit and create a society with the plan to create 100 000 beds divided between the two main resorts of Les Menuires and Val Thorens, plus five satellite resorts.

In 1964, the first three drag lifts were installed. In 1967, the first accommodation residences in the Croisette area were opened, as well as the second stage of the La Masse cable car. In 1969, the tourist office was created together with Les Menuires’ first hotel, and the west side of the mountain was equipped with ski lifts. 1973 saw the first stage of the impressive 3 Valleys ski area, with the Allamands drag lift linking Les Menuires to Méribel, at the same time that the nearby resort of Val Thorens was starting to be developed.

Up to the early 1980s, there was an intense period of development in Les Menuires and Val Thorens. The initial plans were changed along the way with the main objectives being controlled development and preservation of the environment. The number of beds was scaled down to 26 000 in Les Menuires and 20 000 for Val Thorens. The idea of satellite resorts was scrapped and instead the traditional village of Saint-Martin-de-Belleville was created with 1 200 beds. In the end 47 000 beds were created instead of the initially planned 100 000.

The main resort is centered on La Croisette. All of the restaurants, shops, bars, and the hotel Le Pelvoux are linked by an internal gallery. These front onto the piste, and the ski lifts that link the 3 Valleys network.
