= István Oláh Nelu =

Hungarian biathlete (born 1972)

Personal information
- Nationality: Hungarian
- Born: 25 January 1972 (age 53); Miercurea Ciuc, Romania

Sport
- Sport: Biathlon, cross-country skiing

István Oláh Nelu (born 25 January 1972) is a Hungarian biathlete. He competed in the men's 20 km individual event at the 1992 Winter Olympics.
