= László Farkas (biathlete) =

Hungarian biathlete (born 1960)

Personal information
- Nationality: Hungarian
- Born: 2 September 1960 (age 64); Gyöngyös, Hungary

Sport
- Sport: Biathlon

László Farkas (born 2 September 1960) is a Hungarian biathlete. He competed in the men's 20 km individual event at the 1992 Winter Olympics.
