= Balázs Tornay =

Hungarian alpine skier (born 1969)

Personal information
- Nationality: Hungarian
- Born: 31 May 1969 (age 55); Budapest, Hungary

Sport
- Sport: Alpine skiing

Balázs Tornay (born 31 May 1969) is a Hungarian alpine skier. He competed in three events at the 1992 Winter Olympics.
