= Saint-Jean-de-Belleville =

Saint-Jean-de-Belleville Sin Dzan (Savoyard)
- Part of Les Belleville
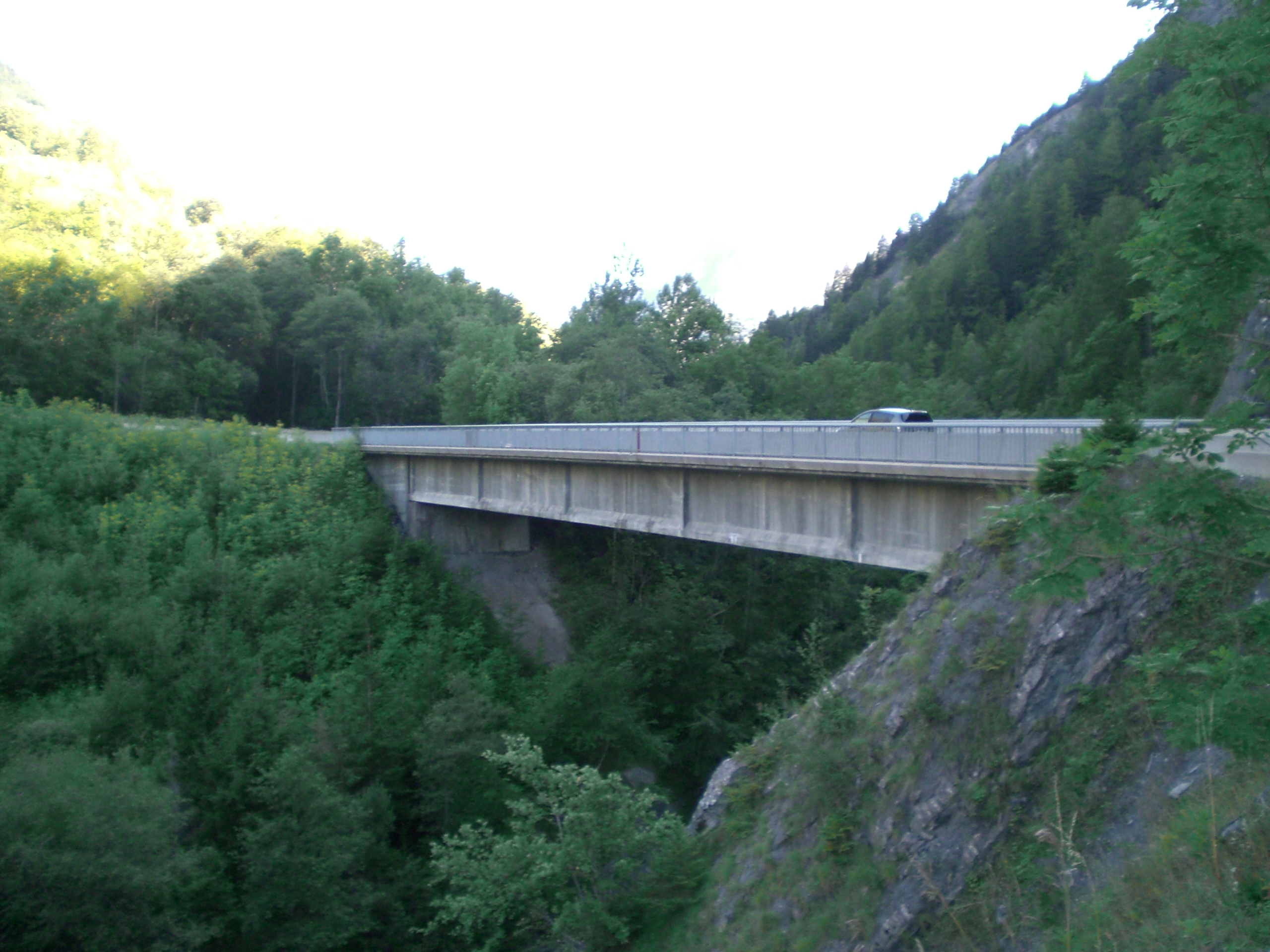
- The bridge into Saint-Jean-de-Belleville
- Location of Saint-Jean-de-Belleville
- Location within France Location within Auvergne-Rhône-Alpes
- Coordinates: 45°25′40″N 6°29′09″E
- Country: France
- Region: Auvergne-Rhône-Alpes
- Department: Savoie
- Arrondissement: Albertville
- Canton: Moûtiers
- Commune: Les Belleville
- Area^{1}: 59.6 km^{2} (23.0 sq mi)
- Highest elevation: 2,822 m (9,259 ft)
- Lowest elevation: 668 m (2,192 ft)
- Population (2022): 561
  - Density: 9.41/km^{2} (24.4/sq mi)
- Time zone: UTC+01:00 (CET)
  - Summer (DST): UTC+02:00 (CEST)
- Postal code: 73440
- ^{1} French Land Register data, which excludes lakes, ponds, glaciers > 1 km^{2} (0.386 sq mi or 247 acres) and river estuaries.

Saint-Jean-de-Belleville (French pronunciation: [sɛ̃ ʒɑ̃ d(ə) bɛlvil]; Savoyard: Sin Dzan) is a former commune in the Savoie department in the Auvergne-Rhône-Alpes region in Southeastern France. On 1 January 2019, it was merged into the commune Les Belleville.

== See also ==
- Communes of the Savoie department
