= János Panyik =

Hungarian biathlete (born 1970)

Personal information
- Nationality: Hungarian
- Born: 25 October 1970 (age 55) Gyöngyös, Hungary

Sport

Professional information
- Club: Gyöngyösi Honvéd Zalka SE

János Panyik (born 25 October 1970) is a retired Hungarian biathlete. He competes in the Biathlon World Cup, and represents Hungary at the three Winter Olympic. His best result vas 10th place at the 1997 World Championships. This is the best Hungarian result ever in biathlon.

== Biathlon results ==
All results are sourced from the International Biathlon Union.

=== Olympic Games ===
Event	Individual	Sprint	Relay
Representing Hungary
(France) 1992 Albertville	78th	73rd	15th
(Norway) 1994 Lillehammer	31st	33rd	—
(Japan) 1998 Nagano	—	63rd	—

=== World Championships ===
Event	Individual	Sprint	Pursuit	Mass start	Team	Relay
Representing Hungary
(Soviet Union) 1990 Minsk	71st	—	—N/a	—N/a	—	—
(Finland) 1991 Lahti	63rd	61st	—N/a	—N/a	—	—
(Bulgaria) 1993 Borovets	81st	83rd	—N/a	—N/a	22nd	22nd
(Italy) 1995 Antholz-Anterselva	42nd	53rd	—N/a	—N/a	20th	22nd
(Germany) 1996 Ruhpolding	64th	70th	—N/a	—N/a	—	22nd
(Slovakia) 1997 Brezno-Osrblie	10th	66th	—	—N/a	21st	—
(Finland) 1999 Kontiolahti	72nd	—	—	—	—N/a	—

*During Olympic seasons competitions are only held for those events not included in the Olympic program.
**Team was removed as an event in 1998, and pursuit was added in 1997 with mass start being added in 1999.
***In 1990 due to unconducive weather conditions during the season it was only possible to hold the individual competitions in Minsk. The sprints, the women's relay and team events were held in Oslo and the men's relay was finally held in Kontiolahti.
***In 1999 due to the cold, the individual and the mass start events were moved to Oslo, Norway.
