= Patrick Ortlieb =

Austrian skier (born 1967)

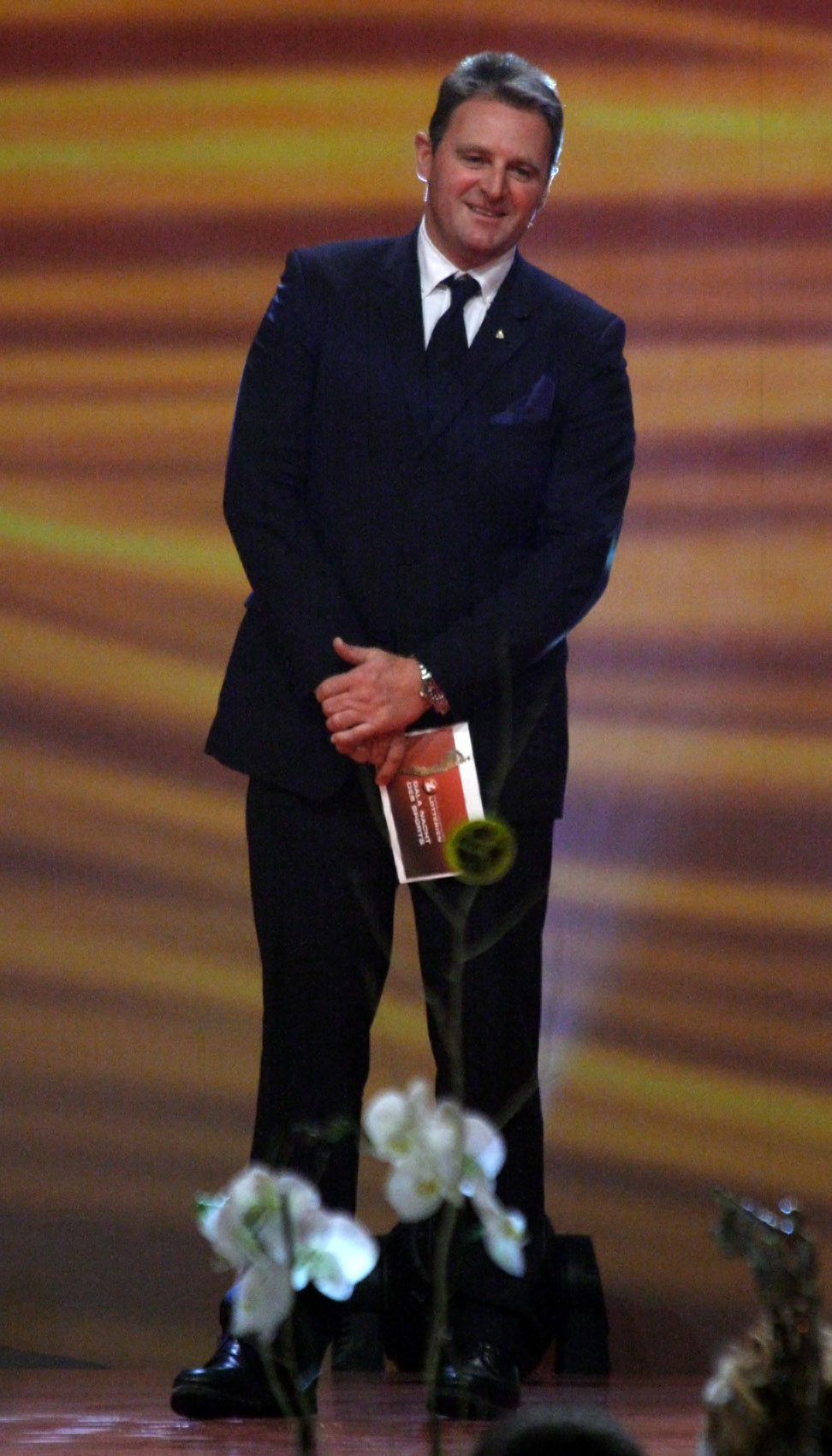
- Ortlieb in 2010

Personal information
- Born: 20 May 1967 (age 59) Bregenz, Vorarlberg, Austria
- Height: 6 ft 2 in (188 cm)

Skiing career
- Sport: Alpine skiing
- Retired: January 1999 (age 31)
- Disciplines: Downhill, Super-G, Combined
- World Cup debut: 9 December 1988 (age 21)

Olympics
- Teams: 2 – (1992, 1994)
- Medals: 1 (1 gold)

World Championships
- Teams: 4 – (1991, 1993, 1996, 1997)
- Medals: 1 (1 gold)

World Cup
- Seasons: 11 – (1989–99)
- Wins: 4 – (3 DH, 1 SG)
- Podiums: 20 – (18 DH, 2 SG)
- Overall titles: 0 – (7th in 1993)
- Discipline titles: 0 – (3rd in DH, 1994–96)
Medal record
Men's alpine skiing
Representing Austria
Olympic Games
Gold medal – first place	1992 Albertville	Downhill
World Championships
Gold medal – first place	1996 Sierra Nevada	Downhill

Patrick Ortlieb (born 20 May 1967) is a former World Cup alpine ski racer and Olympic gold medalist from Austria. A specialist in the speed events, he was also a world champion in the downhill event.

Born in Bregenz in Vorarlberg, Ortlieb started skiing early at the age of three. He won the downhill event at the 1992 Winter Olympics in France, gathered twenty World Cup podiums (sixty top tens), and was World Champion in 1996 in downhill. At the 1994 Winter Olympics in Lillehammer, he finished fourth in the downhill at Kvitfjell. A month earlier, he won the famed downhill on the Hahnenkamm in Kitzbühel, Austria.

Five years later in January 1999, Ortlieb's racing career ended at age 31 after a serious crash during a practice run on the same slope at Kitzbühel. He suffered a compound fracture of the right femur and a badly dislocated and slightly fractured right hip after losing control and crashing into the safety nets at the Hausbergkante (mountain house corner). Later in the year, he was elected to the National Council of Austria for the Freedom Party of Austria, where he stayed for three years.

Ortlieb currently runs a four-star hotel, named Hotel Montana, in Lech am Arlberg in Vorarlberg.

Ortlieb is the father of fellow alpine skier Nina Ortlieb.

== World Cup results ==
=== Race podiums ===
- 4 wins – (3 DH, 1 SG)
- 20 podiums – (18 DH, 2 SG)

Season	Date	Location	Discipline	Place
1989	10 Dec 1988	Val Gardena, Italy	Downhill	2nd
1991	16 Mar 1991	Lake Louise, Canada	Downhill	3rd
1992	11 Jan 1992	Garmisch, Germany	Downhill	2nd
1992	18 Jan 1992	Kitzbühel, Austria	Downhill	3rd
1992	14 Mar 1992	Aspen, USA	Downhill	3rd
1993	11 Dec 1992	Val Gardena, Italy	Downhill	3rd
1993	23 Jan 1993	Veysonnaz, Switzerland	Downhill	2nd
1993	28 Feb 1993	Whistler, Canada	Super-G	3rd
1994	18 Dec 1993	Val Gardena, Italy	Downhill	1st
1994	15 Jan 1994	Kitzbühel, Austria	Downhill	1st
1994	15 Mar 1994	Vail, USA	Downhill	3rd
1995	11 Dec 1994	Tignes, France	Super-G	1st
1995	17 Dec 1994	Val d'Isère, France	Downhill	2nd
1995	13 Jan 1995	Kitzbühel, Austria	Downhill	2nd
1995	25 Feb 1995	Whistler, Canada	Downhill	3rd
1995	11 Mar 1995	Kvitfjell, Norway	Downhill	3rd
1996	1 Dec 1995	Vail, USA	Downhill	3rd
1996	16 Dec 1995	Val Gardena, Italy	Downhill	1st
1996	20 Jan 1996	Veysonnaz, Switzerland	Downhill	2nd
1997	15 Dec 1996	Val d'Isère, France	Downhill	3rd

=== Season standings ===
Season	Age	Overall	Slalom	Giant Slalom	Super-G	Downhill	Combined
1989	21	30	–	–	–	12	—
1990	22	43	–	–	–	17	14
1991	23	23	–	–	26	6	—
1992	24	10	–	–	18	4	18
1993	25	7	–	–	7	7	6
1994	26	12	–	–	21	3	—
1995	27	11	–	–	9	3	—
1996	28	20	–	–	27	3	—
1997	29	33	–	–	16	14	—
1998	30	62	–	–	32	27	—
1999	31	82	–	–	–	35	—

== World Championship results ==
Year	Age	Slalom	Giant slalom	Super-G	Downhill	Combined
1991	23	—	—	—	7	—
1993	25	—	—	cancelled	8	—
1996	28	—	—	—	1	—
1997	29	—	—	—	8	—

- The Super-G in 1993 was cancelled after multiple weather delays.

== Olympic results ==
Year	Age	Slalom	Giant slalom	Super-G	Downhill	Combined
1992	24	—	—	18	1	—
1994	26	—	—	—	4	—
