= Brigitta Bereczki =

Hungarian biathlete (born 1966)

Personal information
- Nationality: Hungarian
- Born: 7 December 1966 (age 58)

Sport
- Sport: Biathlon

Brigitta Bereczki (born 7 December 1966) is a Hungarian biathlete. She competed at the 1992 Winter Olympics and the 1994 Winter Olympics.
