= Stephen Edwards (alpine skier) =

British alpine skier (born 1969)

Personal information
- Born: 24 May 1969 (age 57) Chelsea, London
- Height: 170 cm (5 ft 7 in)
- Weight: 69 kg (152 lb)

Sport
- Sport: Alpine skiing

Stephen Edwards (born 24 May 1969) is a British former alpine skier. He competed in the slalom at the 1992 Winter Olympics, but did not finish.
