= Christopher Blagden =

British alpine skier (born 1971)

Christopher Blagden (born 26 September 1971) is a British former alpine skier who competed in the 1992 Winter Olympics.
