= Brad King (alpine skier) =

Canadian alpine skier (born 1966)

Brad King (born 4 February 1966) is a Canadian former alpine skier who competed in the 1992 Winter Olympics.
