= Tibor Géczi =

Hungarian biathlete (born 1965)

Personal information
- Nationality: Hungarian
- Born: 12 June 1965 (age 59); Pásztó, Hungary

Sport
- Sport: Biathlon

Tibor Géczi (born 12 June 1965) is a Hungarian biathlete. He competed in the men's 20 km individual event at the 1992 Winter Olympics.
