= Les Belleville =

- Commune
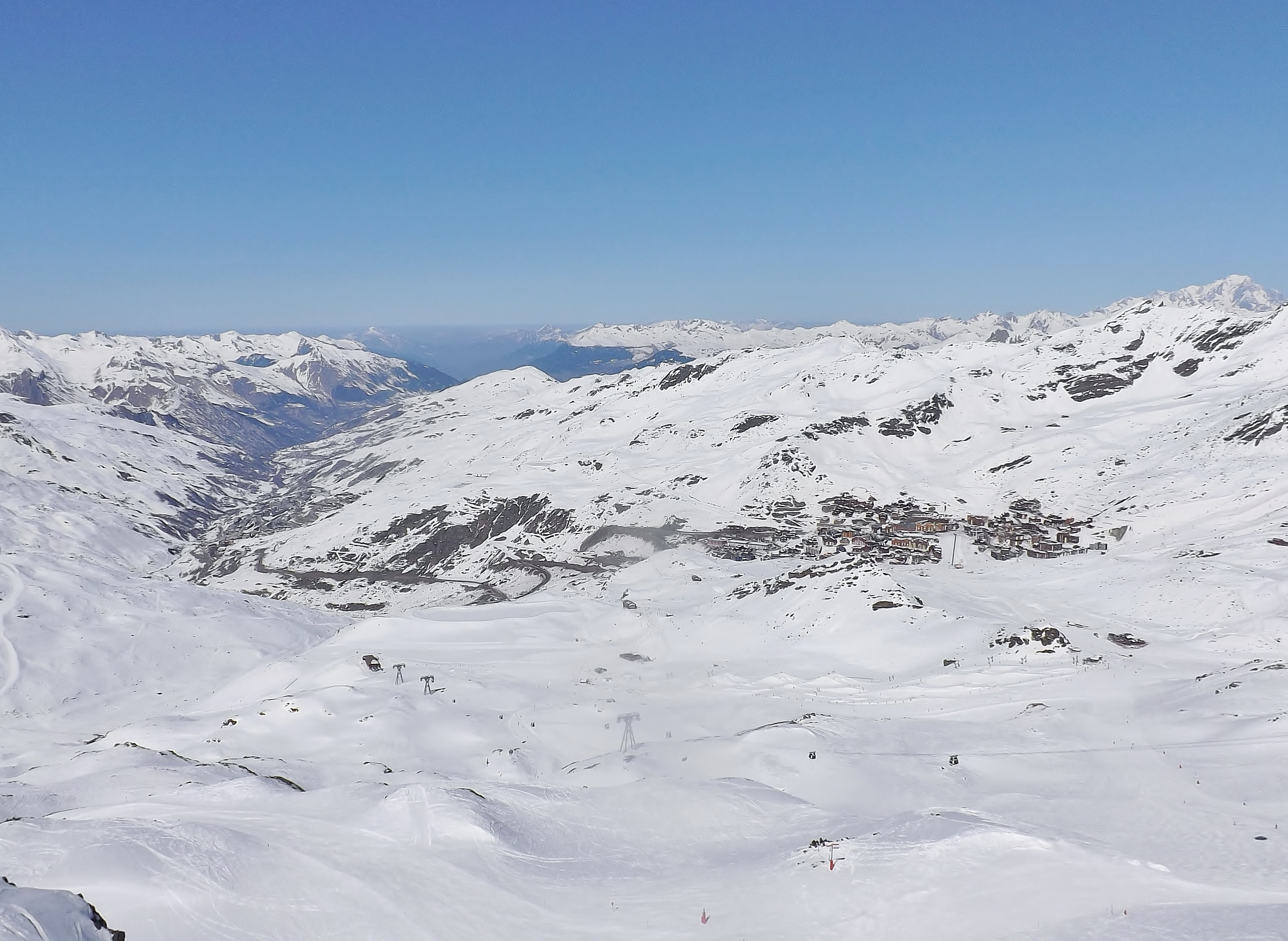
- The Belleville valley
- Location of Les Belleville
- Location within France Location within Auvergne-Rhône-Alpes
- Coordinates: 45°22′48″N 6°30′19″E
- Country: France
- Region: Auvergne-Rhône-Alpes
- Department: Savoie
- Arrondissement: Albertville
- Canton: Moûtiers

Government
  - Mayor (2020–2026): Claude Jay
- Area^{1}: 226.84 km^{2} (87.58 sq mi)
- Highest elevation: 3,564 m (11,693 ft)
- Lowest elevation: 509 m (1,670 ft)
- Population (2023): 3,498
  - Density: 15.42/km^{2} (39.94/sq mi)
- Time zone: UTC+01:00 (CET)
  - Summer (DST): UTC+02:00 (CEST)
- INSEE/Postal code: 73257 /73440, 73600
- ^{1} French Land Register data, which excludes lakes, ponds, glaciers > 1 km^{2} (0.386 sq mi or 247 acres) and river estuaries.

Les Belleville (French pronunciation: [le bɛlvil]) is a commune in the Savoie department of southeastern France. The municipality was established on 1 January 2016 by the merger of the former communes of Saint-Martin-de-Belleville and Villarlurin. On 1 January 2019, the former commune Saint-Jean-de-Belleville was merged into Les Belleville.

== Geography ==
=== Climate ===
Les Belleville has a humid continental climate (Köppen climate classification Dfb). The average annual temperature in Les Belleville is 6.5 °C (43.7 °F). The average annual rainfall is 926.3 mm (36.47 in) with December as the wettest month. The temperatures are highest on average in July, at around 15.1 °C (59.2 °F), and lowest in January, at around −1.3 °C (29.7 °F). The highest temperature ever recorded in Les Belleville was 32.3 °C (90.1 °F) on 7 July 2015; the coldest temperature ever recorded was −24.0 °C (−11.2 °F) on 12 January 1987.

Climate data for Les Belleville (Saint-Martin-de-Belleville, altitude 1443m, 1991–2020 normals, extremes 1983–present)
Month	Jan	Feb	Mar	Apr	May	Jun	Jul	Aug	Sep	Oct	Nov	Dec	Year
Record high °C (°F)	14.9 (58.8)	19.0 (66.2)	20.0 (68.0)	22.4 (72.3)	27.5 (81.5)	32.3 (90.1)	32.3 (90.1)	31.4 (88.5)	26.9 (80.4)	25.4 (77.7)	20.2 (68.4)	15.6 (60.1)	32.3 (90.1)
Mean daily maximum °C (°F)	3.3 (37.9)	4.0 (39.2)	7.3 (45.1)	10.5 (50.9)	14.6 (58.3)	18.7 (65.7)	21.1 (70.0)	20.6 (69.1)	16.3 (61.3)	12.4 (54.3)	6.9 (44.4)	3.8 (38.8)	11.6 (52.9)
Daily mean °C (°F)	−1.3 (29.7)	−1.0 (30.2)	2.2 (36.0)	5.3 (41.5)	9.3 (48.7)	13.0 (55.4)	15.1 (59.2)	14.9 (58.8)	11.1 (52.0)	7.5 (45.5)	2.5 (36.5)	−0.5 (31.1)	6.5 (43.7)
Mean daily minimum °C (°F)	−5.9 (21.4)	−5.9 (21.4)	−2.8 (27.0)	0.2 (32.4)	3.9 (39.0)	7.2 (45.0)	9.1 (48.4)	9.1 (48.4)	5.8 (42.4)	2.6 (36.7)	−1.9 (28.6)	−4.9 (23.2)	1.4 (34.5)
Record low °C (°F)	−24.0 (−11.2)	−23.4 (−10.1)	−19.1 (−2.4)	−12.5 (9.5)	−7.0 (19.4)	−5.6 (21.9)	0.5 (32.9)	−0.3 (31.5)	−4.3 (24.3)	−10.4 (13.3)	−18.6 (−1.5)	−19.4 (−2.9)	−24.0 (−11.2)
Average precipitation mm (inches)	77.9 (3.07)	61.7 (2.43)	59.5 (2.34)	57.8 (2.28)	87.4 (3.44)	84.2 (3.31)	84.6 (3.33)	88.2 (3.47)	71.6 (2.82)	77.1 (3.04)	78.2 (3.08)	98.1 (3.86)	926.3 (36.47)
Average precipitation days (≥ 1.0 mm)	8.7	7.7	8.2	8.9	11.6	10.7	9.8	9.7	8.5	9.4	9.4	10.7	113.3
Source: Météo-France

== Population ==
The population data below refer to the commune in its geography as of January 2025.

Historical population
Year	Pop.	±% p.a.
1968	1,995	—
1975	2,432	+2.87%
1982	2,481	+0.29%
1990	3,036	+2.56%
1999	3,248	+0.75%
2007	3,658	+1.50%
2012	3,499	−0.88%
2017	3,494	−0.03%
2023	3,498	+0.02%
Source: INSEE

== See also ==
- Communes of the Savoie department
