= Kathalin Czifra =

Hungarian biathlete (born 1972)

Personal information
- Nationality: Hungarian
- Born: 29 December 1972 (age 52)

Sport
- Sport: Biathlon

Kathalin Czifra (born 29 December 1972) is a Hungarian biathlete. She competed in three events at the 1992 Winter Olympics.
