= Choi Yong-hee =

South Korean alpine skier (born 1971)

Personal information
- Nationality: South Korean
- Born: 25 June 1971 (age 53)

Sport
- Sport: Alpine skiing

Choi Yong-hee (born 25 June 1971) is a South Korean alpine skier. He competed in five events at the 1992 Winter Olympics.
