= Péter Kristály =

Hungarian alpine skier (born 1967)

Personal information
- Nationality: Hungarian
- Born: 15 October 1964 (age 60); Miercurea Ciuc, Romania

Sport
- Sport: Alpine skiing

Péter Kristály (born 15 October 1967) is a Hungarian alpine skier. He competed in five events at the 1992 Winter Olympics.
