= Gianfranco Martin =

Italian alpine skier (born 1970)

Personal information
- Born: 15 February 1970 (age 56) Genoa, Italy

Skiing career
- Sport: Alpine skiing

Olympics
- Medals: 1 (0 gold)
Medal record
Olympic Games
Silver medal – second place	1992 Albertville	Combined

Gianfranco Martin (born 15 February 1970) is an Italian alpine skier who competed in the 1992 Winter Olympics and in the 1994 Winter Olympics. He now runs a hotel designed for disabled athletes and founded a fitness association based in Sestriere, Italy, to help disabled children succeed in snow sports.

== Biography ==
He was born in Genoa. In 1992 he won the silver medal in the Alpine combined event. In the super-G competition he finished twelfth and in the downhill contest he finished 14th. Two years later he finished 15th in the Alpine combined event and 29th in the giant slalom competition.

== See also ==
- Italy national alpine ski team at the Olympics
