= Pierre Kőszáli =

Hungarian alpine skier (born 1971)

Personal information
- Nationality: Hungarian
- Born: 11 January 1971 (age 54); Lausanne, Switzerland

Sport
- Sport: Alpine skiing

Pierre Kőszáli (born 11 January 1971) is a Hungarian alpine skier. He competed in four events at the 1992 Winter Olympics.
