= Cary Mullen =

Canadian alpine skier (born 1969)

Cary Mullen (born 2 October 1969) is a Canadian former alpine skier who competed in the 1992 Winter Olympics and 1994 Winter Olympics.
