= Lamine Guèye (skier) =

Senegalese alpine skier

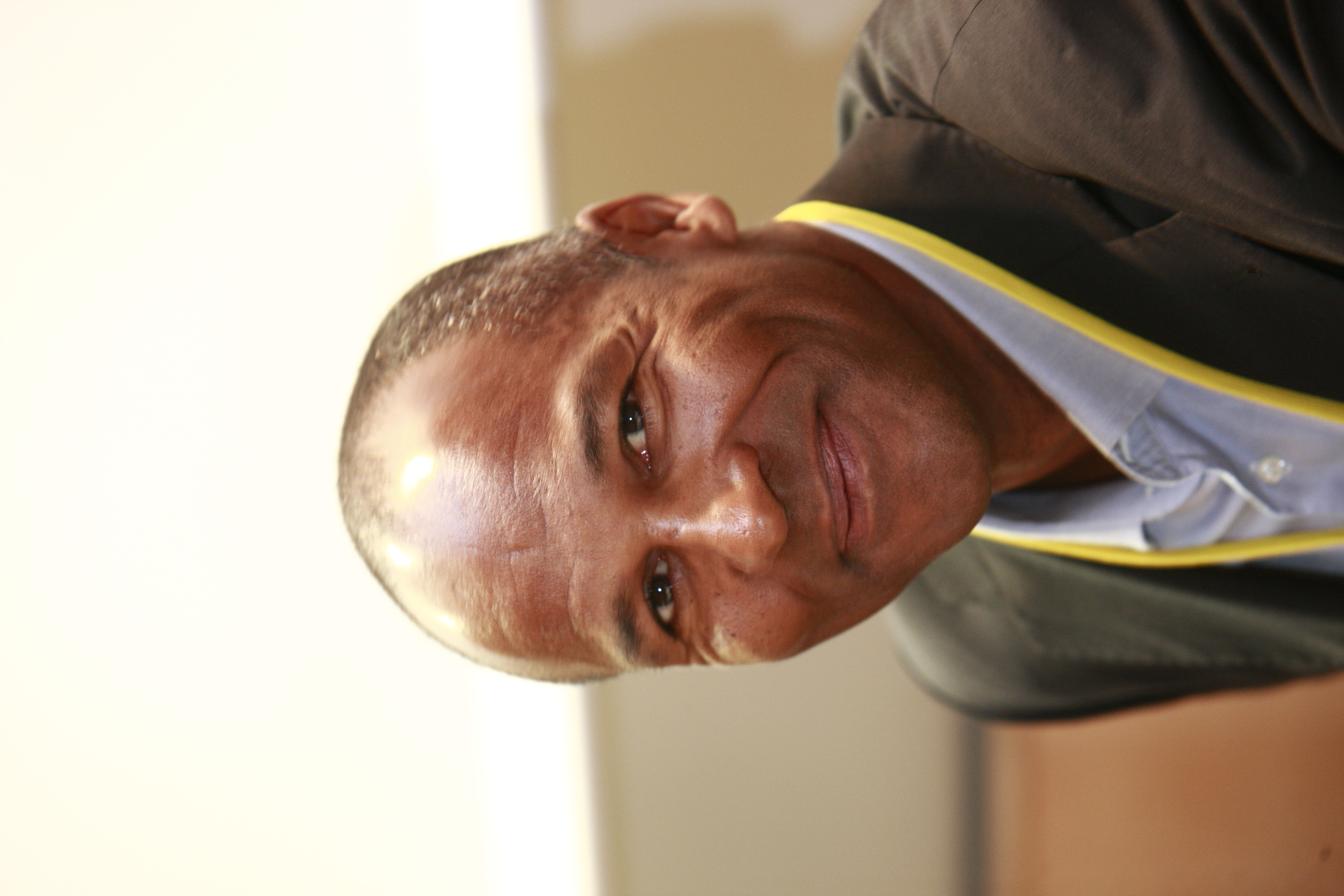
- Born: 18 July 1960 (age 64); Dakar, Senegal
- Height: 192 cm (6.30 ft)

Lamine Guèye (born 18 July 1960) is a Senegalese skier, and the current president of the Senegalese Ski Federation, which he founded in 1979. He competed at three Winter Olympic Games for Senegal, in 1984, 1992 and 1994.

== Early life ==
Born in Dakar, Senegal, on 18 July 1960, Lamine Guèye was sent to live in Switzerland in 1968 following the death of his grandfather and namesake, Lamine Guèye, who was leader of the Senegalese Party of Socialist Action and the National Assembly. The young Guèye had expected to see snow immediately, and was surprised how green his new surroundings were. It was not until Christmas that year that Guèye saw snow for the first time.

By the age of 17, Guèye already had an interest in skiing, but was playing hockey at the time. He approached the International Ski Federation with the aim of creating the Senegalese Ski Federation, although they initially thought that he was joking. Over the course of the following year, Guèye wrote the statutes of his new Federation in three different languages and presented them to Léopold Sédar Senghor, President of Senegal, who received them warmly. He watched the 1980 Winter Olympics on television, and is further inspired by Austrian skier Franz Klammer. Although Guèye continued to pursue the work of the Senegalese Ski Federation, he expected to be passed over for the 1984 Winter Olympics, but was informed by the International Olympic Committee that he would be allowed to compete for Senegal.

== Olympics ==
Guèye participated in the 1984 Winter Games in Sarajevo, later recalling that as the sole representative of Senegal, he was sandwiched between the teams from the United States and the Soviet Union - the two largest contingents of athletes. In competing, he became the first Black African to compete at a Winter Games. He competed in two events, the men's downhill and the Super-G, finishing 51st and 57th respectively.

He temporarily retired from skiing following the Games, and undertook modelling and acting jobs, but mainly working in financial and import/export jobs. Guèye watched the performance of the Jamaican bobsled team at the 1988 Winter Olympics on television, which inspired him to return to the Games. At the 1992 Winter Olympics, he participated in five skiing events, placing 45th in the downhill, 66th in the giant slalom and 78th in the Super-G. He did not finish in the slalom and the combined.

Following changes to the qualification criteria for the 1994 Winter Olympics, Guèye was permitted to participate as Senegal's sole representative as he was ranked within the top 1500 skiers in the world. He participated in the men's downhill, but did not finish and therefore did not receive an overall ranking.

== Later life ==
Guèye has been a prominent figure in drawing attention to what he considers to be discriminatory qualification rules for the Winter Olympics, and has written to the International Olympic Committee requesting that all countries be granted the right to participate in the Winter Games, as was the case up to 1992 (included), and as is still the case for the Summer Olympics. In 2001, he published the letter he had sent to Jacques Rogge, stating "Up until the 1992 Olympic Games, included, every country could send four athletes per event to alpine skiing, and we were able to believe that we were equal. Those were the last true Winter Olympic Games." Because of those changes, African participants in the Winter Games decreased from 19 competitors in 1992 to three in 1994. Guèye wrote the book Skieur sénégalais cherche esprit olympique.

== See also ==
- Tofiri Kibuuka, the first African to compete at the Winter Paralympic Games, eight years before Guèye first competed at the Olympics
