= Alphonse Gomis =

Senegalese alpine skier (born 1965)

Personal information
- Nationality: Senegalese
- Born: 14 October 1965 (age 61)

Sport
- Sport: Alpine skiing

Alphonse Gomis (born 14 October 1965) is a Senegalese alpine skier. He competed in five events at the 1992 Winter Olympics.
