= Alpine skiing at the 1992 Winter Olympics =

Alpine skiing at the XVI Olympic Winter Games
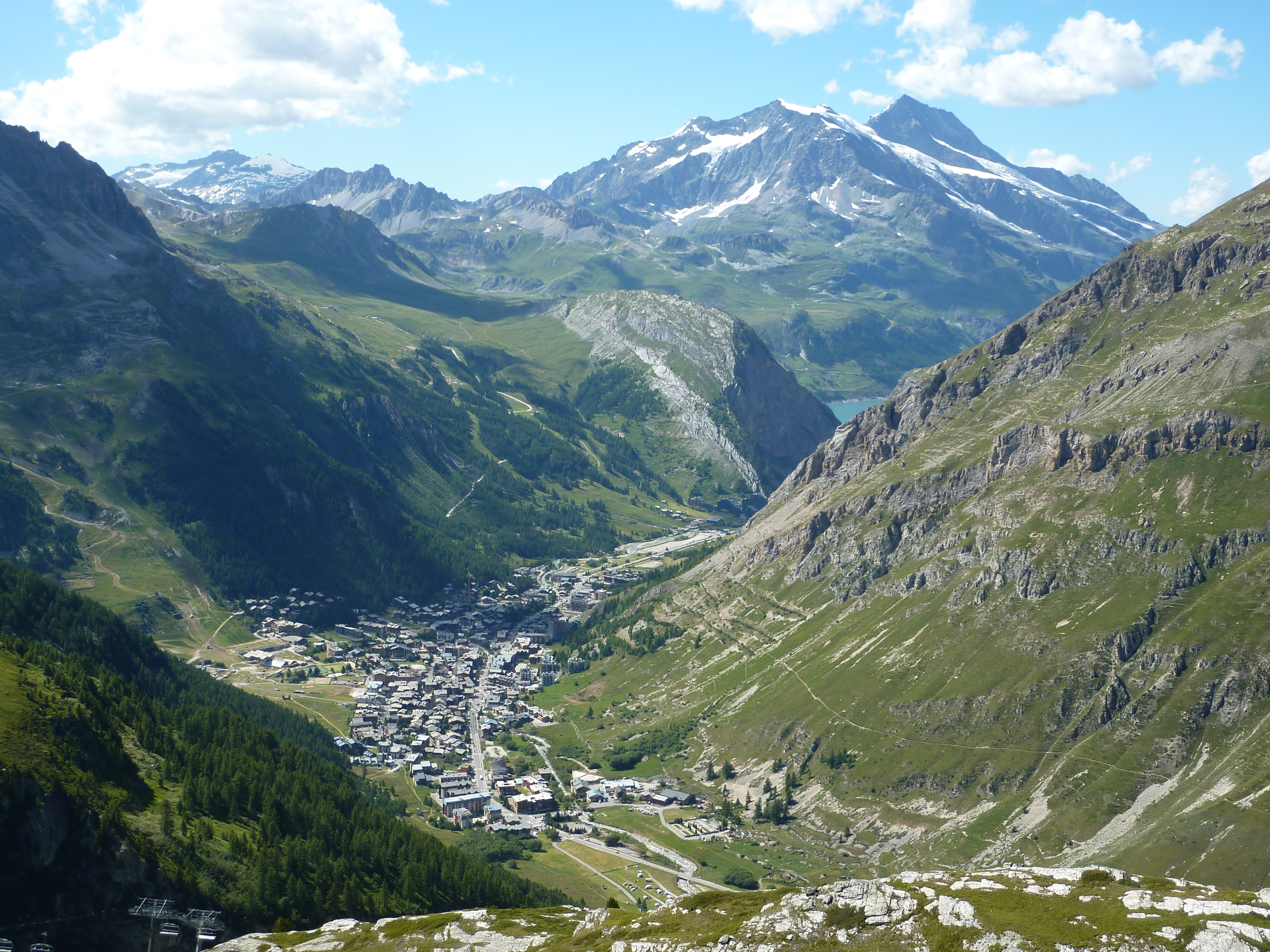
- Val-d'Isère
- Venue: Val-d'Isère, Les Menuires (men's slalom), Méribel (women's races), Savoie, France
- Dates: 9–22 February 1992
- No. of events: 10
- Competitors: 321 from 50 nations

Alpine skiing at the 1992 Winter Olympics at Albertville, France, consisted of ten alpine skiing events, held 9–22 February. The men's races were held at Val d’Isère, except for the slalom, which was at Les Menuires. All five women's events were conducted at Méribel.

== Medal summary ==
Twelve nations won medals in Alpine skiing, with Austria leading the medal table with eight (3 gold, 2 silver, and 3 bronze). Petra Kronberger of Austria led the individual medal table with two gold medals, while Alberto Tomba of Italy was the most successful male skier with two medals, one gold and one silver.

Marc Girardelli's two silver medals were the first won for Luxembourg in the Winter Olympics, and made him its most successful Olympic athlete to date. Annelise Coberger's silver medal in the women's slalom was New Zealand's first, and until 2014, only Winter Olympic medal. It was also the first ever medal for a competitor from the Southern Hemisphere. Norway's four medals were its first in alpine skiing in 40 years, since 1952 in Oslo.

=== Medal table ===
Rank	Nation	Gold	Silver	Bronze	Total
1	Austria	3	2	3	8
2	Italy	3	2	0	5
3	Norway	2	0	2	4
4	Canada	1	0	0	1
4	Sweden	1	0	0	1
6	France	0	2	1	3
7	Luxembourg	0	2	0	2
7	United States	0	2	0	2
9	New Zealand	0	1	0	1
10	Germany	0	0	1	1
10	Spain	0	0	1	1
10	Switzerland	0	0	1	1
Totals (12 entries)		10	11	9	30

=== Men's events ===
Event	Gold		Silver		Bronze	
Downhill	Patrick Ortlieb; Austria	1:50.37	Franck Piccard; France	1:50.42	Günther Mader; Austria	1:50.47
Super-G	Kjetil André Aamodt; Norway	1:13.04	Marc Girardelli; Luxembourg	1:13.77	Jan Einar Thorsen; Norway	1:13.83
Giant slalom	Alberto Tomba; Italy	2:06.98	Marc Girardelli; Luxembourg	2:07.30	Kjetil André Aamodt; Norway	2:07.82
Slalom	Finn Christian Jagge; Norway	1:44.39	Alberto Tomba; Italy	1:44.67	Michael Tritscher; Austria	1:44.85
Combined	Josef Polig; Italy	14.58	Gianfranco Martin; Italy	14.90	Steve Locher; Switzerland	18.16

=== Women's events ===
Event	Gold		Silver		Bronze	
Downhill	Kerrin Lee-Gartner; Canada	1:52.55	Hilary Lindh; United States	1:52.61	Veronika Wallinger; Austria	1:52.64
Super-G	Deborah Compagnoni; Italy	1:21.22	Carole Merle; France	1:22.63	Katja Seizinger; Germany	1:23.19
Giant slalom	Pernilla Wiberg; Sweden	2:12.74	Anita Wachter; Austria; Diann Roffe; United States	2:13.71	Not awarded	
Slalom	Petra Kronberger; Austria	1:32.68	Annelise Coberger; New Zealand	1:33.10	Blanca Fernández Ochoa; Spain	1:33.35
Combined	Petra Kronberger; Austria	2.55	Anita Wachter; Austria	19.39	Florence Masnada; France	21.38

== Course information ==
Date	Race	Start Elevation	Finish Elevation	Vertical Drop	Course Length	Average Gradient
Sun 9-Feb	Downhill – men	2,809 m (9,216 ft)	1,836 m (6,024 ft)	973 m (3,192 ft)	3.048 km (1.894 mi)	31.9%
Sat 15-Feb	Downhill – women	2,260 m (7,415 ft)	1,432 m (4,698 ft)	828 m (2,717 ft)	2.770 km (1.721 mi)	29.9%
Mon 10-Feb	Downhill - (K) – men	2,680 m (8,793 ft)	1,836 m (6,024 ft)	844 m (2,769 ft)	2.638 km (1.639 mi)	32.0%
Wed 12-Feb	Downhill - (K) – women	2,080 m (6,824 ft)	1,432 m (4,698 ft)	648 m (2,126 ft)	2.200 km (1.367 mi)	29.5%
Sun 16-Feb	Super-G – men	2,371 m (7,779 ft)	1,836 m (6,024 ft)	535 m (1,755 ft)	1.650 km (1.025 mi)	32.4%
Tue 18-Feb	Super-G – women	1,930 m (6,332 ft)	1,432 m (4,698 ft)	498 m (1,634 ft)	1.510 km (0.938 mi)	33.0%
Tue 18-Feb	Giant slalom – men	2,220 m (7,283 ft)	1,836 m (6,024 ft)	384 m (1,260 ft)	1.135 km (0.705 mi)	33.8%
Wed 19-Feb	Giant slalom – women	1,830 m (6,004 ft)	1,432 m (4,698 ft)	398 m (1,306 ft)	1.320 km (0.820 mi)	30.2%
Sat 22-Feb	Slalom – men	2,070 m (6,791 ft)	1,850 m (6,070 ft)	220 m (722 ft)	0.626 km (0.389 mi)	35.1%
Thu 20-Feb	Slalom – women	1,622 m (5,322 ft)	1,432 m (4,698 ft)	190 m (623 ft)	0.480 km (0.298 mi)	39.6%
Tue 11-Feb	Slalom – (K) – men	2,040 m (6,693 ft)	1,836 m (6,024 ft)	204 m (669 ft)		
Thu 13-Feb	Slalom – (K) – women	1,572 m (5,157 ft)	1,432 m (4,698 ft)	140 m (459 ft)	0.350 km (0.217 mi)	40.0%

== Participating nations ==
Fifty nations sent alpine skiers to compete in the events in Albertville. Algeria, Brazil, Croatia, Denmark, North Korea, Slovenia, Swaziland and the Unified Team (athletes from the former Soviet Union) made their Olympic alpine skiing debuts. Germany competed as one team for the first time since 1964. Below is a list of the competing nations; in parentheses are the number of national competitors.

- Algeria (4)
- Andorra (5)
- Argentina (6)
- Australia (2)
- Austria (20)
- Bolivia (5)
- Brazil (7)
- Bulgaria (3)
- Canada (10)
- Chile (5)
- China (2)
- Costa Rica (4)
- Croatia (1)
- Czechoslovakia (4)
- Cyprus (5)
- Denmark (2)
- France (19)
- Germany (14)
- Great Britain (12)
- Greece (3)
- Hungary (6)
- Iceland (3)
- India (2)
- Italy (18)
- Japan (6)
- North Korea (2)
- South Korea (2)
- Lebanon (4)
- Liechtenstein (6)
- Luxembourg (1)
- Mexico (10)
- Morocco (9)
- New Zealand (2)
- Norway (11)
- Philippines (1)
- Poland (3)
- Romania (3)
- San Marino (2)
- Senegal (2)
- Slovenia (11)
- Spain (10)
- Swaziland (1)
- Sweden (8)
- Switzerland (21)
- Chinese Taipei (3)
- Turkey (4)
- Unified Team (7)
- United States (20)
- Virgin Islands (2)
- Yugoslavia (9)
