= Ice hockey at the 1992 Winter Olympics =

1992 Winter Olympics Ice Hockey
Tournament details
- Host country: France
- Venue: Méribel Ice Palace
- Dates: 9–23 February
- Teams: 12

Final positions
- Champions: Unified Team (1st title)
- Runners-up: Canada
- Third place: Czechoslovakia
- Fourth place: United States

Tournament statistics
- Games played: 46
- Goals scored: 316 (6.87 per game)
- Scoring leader: (Canada) Joe Juneau (15 points)

The men's ice hockey tournament at the 1992 Winter Olympics in Albertville, France, was the 17th Olympic Championship. All the games were played at the Méribel Ice Palace in Méribel, about 45 km from host city Albertville. The competition, held from 9 to 23 February, was won by the Unified Team in its only appearance. The team was composed of some newly emerged nations from the former Soviet Union, which had dissolved just weeks before the Games began. Canada won the silver medal, its first hockey medal since 1968 and 11th Olympic ice hockey medal overall.

== Medalists ==
Gold	Silver	Bronze
Unified Team Sergei Bautin; Igor Boldin; Nikolai Borschevsky; Vyacheslav Butsayev; Vyacheslav Bykov; Evgeni Davydov; Alexei Zhitnik; Darius Kasparaitis; Nikolai Khabibulin; Yuri Khmylev; Andrei Khomutov; Andrei Kovalenko; Alexei Kovalev; Igor Kravchuk; Vladimir Malakhov; Dmitri Mironov; Sergei Petrenko; Vitali Prokhorov; Mikhail Shtalenkov; Andrei Trefilov; Dmitri Yushkevich; Alexei Zhamnov; Sergei Zubov	Canada Dave Archibald; Todd Brost; Sean Burke; Kevin Dahl; Curt Giles; David Hannan; Gordon Hynes; Fabian Joseph; Joe Juneau; Trevor Kidd; Patrick Lebeau; Chris Lindberg; Eric Lindros; Kent Manderville; Adrien Plavsic; Dan Ratushny; Sam Saint-Laurent; Brad Schlegel; Wallace Schreiber; Randy Smith; David Tippett; Brian Tutt; Jason Woolley	Czechoslovakia Patrik Augusta; Petr Bříza; Jaromír Dragan; Leo Gudas; Miloslav Hořava; Petr Hrbek; Otakar Janecký; Tomáš Jelínek; Drahomír Kadlec; Kamil Kašťák; Robert Lang; Igor Liba; Ladislav Lubina; František Procházka; Petr Rosol; Bedřich Ščerban; Jiří Šlégr; Richard Šmehlík; Róbert Švehla; Oldřich Svoboda; Radek Ťoupal; Peter Veselovský; Richard Žemlička

== Qualification ==
The Olympic tournament was to be contested by twelve nations. The top eleven nations from the 1991 World Championships (eight from pool A, top three from pool B) qualified directly, while the twelfth ranked nation had to play off against the winner of that year's pool C.

14 April 1991	Denmark	4–6 (0–5, 2–1, 2–0)	Poland	Copenhagen

16 April 1991	Poland	9–5 (4–2, 2–2, 3–1)	Denmark	Oświęcim

Poland qualified to final tournament

== First round ==
Twelve participating teams were placed in two groups. After playing a round-robin, the top four teams in each group advanced to the Medal Round while the last two teams competed in the consolation round for the 9th to 12th places.

=== Group A ===
Pos	Team	Pld	W	D	L	GF	GA	GD	Pts	Qualification
1	United States	5	4	1	0	18	7	+11	9	Quarterfinals
2	Sweden	5	3	2	0	22	11	+11	8	Quarterfinals
3	Finland	5	3	1	1	22	11	+11	7	Quarterfinals
4	Germany	5	2	0	3	11	12	−1	4	Quarterfinals
5	Italy	5	1	0	4	18	24	−6	2	consolation round
6	Poland	5	0	0	5	4	30	−26	0	consolation round

Source: Olympedia

All times are local (UTC+1).

9 February 1992; 13:00	Sweden	7–2 (2–1, 3–0, 2–1)	Poland	Méribel Ice Palace, Méribel; Attendance: 1,978

Tommy Söderström
Goalies
Gabriel Samolej
Referee:
(Switzerland) Christian Frey
Linesmen:
(Italy) Thomas Gasser
(Unified Team at the Olympics) Shamil Sharikov

L. Edström – 1:41	1–0
P. Erickson (P. Kjellberg) – 7:40	2–0
	2–1	19:12 — J. Hajnos (K. Bujar)
H. Loob (T. Rundqvist) – 20:18	3—1
C. Berglund (B. Salming) — 38:06	4—1
H. Loob (T. Rundqvist, P. Andersson) — 20:18	5—1
	5—2	44:42 — W. Klisiak (M. Tomasis, J. Hajnos)
T. Sjödin (M. Johansson) — 45:50	6—2
L. Edström (P. Carnbäck) — 52:28	7–2

6 min
Penalties
4 min
42
Shots
9

9 February 1992; 16:30	Finland	5–1 (1–0, 2–0, 2–1)	Germany	Méribel Ice Palace, Méribel; Attendance: 4,410

Markus Ketterer
Goalies
Karl Friesen
Referee:
(United States) Donald Adam
Linesmen:
(France) Jean-Christophe Benoist
(Norway) Erik Larssen

M. Nieminen (H. Järvenpää) — 3:08	1–0
H. Järvenpää (A. Ruotanen) — 33:50	2–0
H. Järvenpää (M. Nieminen, T. Selänne) — 36:43	3—0
	3—1	44:19 — A. Brockmann (M. Heidt) (PP)
T. Selänne (H. Järvenpää) — 45:47	4—1
T. Selänne (H. Järvenpää, M. Nieminen) — 51:43	5—1

14 min
Penalties
22 min
33
Shots
16

9 February 1992; 20:15	United States	6–3 (2–1, 0–2, 4–0)	Italy	Méribel Ice Palace, Méribel; Attendance: 5,445

Ray LeBlanc
Goalies
David Delfino
Referee:
(Finland) Seppo Makela
Linesmen:
(France) Jean-Phillippe Ollier
(Germany) Richard Schutz

M. Mantha (S. Heinze, C. J. Young) — 2:31	1–0
J. Johansson (T. Drury, K. Tkachuk) — 7:18	2–0
	2—1	18:12 — B. Zarrillo (B. Stewart) (PP)
	2—2	38:45 — J. Foglietta (M. De Angelis, T. Circelli)
	2—3
C. Donatelli (T. Sweeney) — 41:41	3—3
S. Heinze (T. Donato) — 47:02	4—3
T. Sweeney — 48:37	5—3
C. J. Young (T. Sweeney) (PP) — 53:41	6—3

12 min
Penalties
16 min
37
Shots
23

11 February 1992; 13:00	Finland	9–1 (4–0, 1–0, 4–1)	Poland	Méribel Ice Palace, Méribel; Attendance: 2,953

Jukka Tammi
Goalies
Marek Batkiewicz
Referee:
(Germany) Bernhard Schneider
Linesmen:
(Czechoslovakia) Miloš Benek
(France) Jean-Phillippe Ollier

T. Jutila (S. Saarinen, M. Mäkelä) (PP) — 2:41	1–0
R. Helminen (P. Skriko, M. Mäkelä) (PP) — 15:20	2–0
R. Summanen (J. Lindroos, P. Tuomisto) — 17:28	3—0
M. Mäkelä (J. Laukkanen, T. Jutila) — 18:36	4—0
H. Järvenpää (V. Sirén, M. Nieminen) — 37:32	5—0
M. Mäkelä (M. Nieminen, H. Järvenpää) (PP) — 45:32	6—0
	6—1	54:46 — M. Puzio (A. Świstak, R. Sroka)
T. Selänne (H. Järvenpää, M. Nieminen) (PP) — 56:09	7—1
P. Tuomisto (J. Lindroos) — 56:57	8—1
T. Selänne (A. Ruotanen, M. Nieminen) — 59:19	9—1

12 min
Penalties
16 min
28
Shots
16

11 February 1992; 16:30	United States	2–0 (0–0, 1–0, 1–0)	Germany	Méribel Ice Palace, Méribel; Attendance: 6,063

Ray LeBlanc	Goalies	Helmut de Raaf	Referee: (Unified Team at the Olympics) Nikolay Morozov; Linesmen: (Finland) Janne Rautavuori (Sweden) Johan Enestedt
M. McInnis (M. Mantha) (PP) — 25:25 / 1–0; T. Donato (PP) — 51:58 / 2–0			Referee: (Unified Team at the Olympics) Nikolay Morozov; Linesmen: (Finland) Janne Rautavuori (Sweden) Johan Enestedt
12 min	Penalties	10 min	Referee: (Unified Team at the Olympics) Nikolay Morozov; Linesmen: (Finland) Janne Rautavuori (Sweden) Johan Enestedt
27	Shots	46	Referee: (Unified Team at the Olympics) Nikolay Morozov; Linesmen: (Finland) Janne Rautavuori (Sweden) Johan Enestedt

11 February 1992; 20:15	Sweden	7–3 (2–0, 4–1, 1–2)	Italy	Méribel Ice Palace, Méribel; Attendance: 3,215

Tommy Söderström
Goalies
Michael Zanier
Referee:
(Czechoslovakia) Jiří Lipa
Linesmen:
(France) Jean-Christophe Benoist
(Canada) Jim Carmen

H. Loob (B. Salming, T. Rundqvist) — 3:38	1–0
T. Sjödin (J. Viktorsson) — 6:10	2–0
L. Edström (B.-A. Gustafsson, P. Ottosson) — 21:14	3—0
P. Kjellberg (P. Andersson, H. Loob) — 29:11	4—0
	4—1	35:13 — E. Iovio
B. Salming (P. Erickson, M. Näslund) (PP) — 37:06	5—1
B. Salming (P. Ottosson) (PP) — 38:27	6—1
D. Rydmark (M. Näslund) — 44:08	7—1
	7—2	48:34 — B. Ginnetti (B. Manno, J. Camazzola) (PP)
	7—3	59:19 — R. Morocco (F. Nigro, I. Zanatta)

8 min
Penalties
12 min
45
Shots
13

13 February 1992; 13:00	Italy	7–1 (5–1, 1–0, 1–0)	Poland	Méribel Ice Palace, Méribel; Attendance: 2,390

David Delfino
Goalies
Gabriel Samolej
Marek Batkiewicz
Referee:
(Sweden) Sven-Erik Sold
Linesmen:
(United States) John Malinovski
(Norway) Erik Larssen

B. Zarrillo (R. Oberrauch, B. Stewart) — 3:05	1–0
E. Iovio (F. Nigro) — 4:09	2–0
J. Foglietta (S. Pellegrino) (PP) — 11:43	3—0
L. Topatigh — 15:42	4—0
	4—1	16:00 — R. Szopiński (W. Tkacz)
S. Pellegrino (I. Zanatta) — 16:31	5—1
B. Zarrillo (L. Topatigh, T. Circelli) — 24:09	6—1
B. Ginnetti (B. Zarrillo)	7—1

16 min
Penalties
6 min
29
Shots
33

11 February 1992; 16:30	United States	4–1 (1–0, 1–1, 2–0)	Finland	Méribel Ice Palace, Méribel; Attendance: 6,100

Ray LeBlanc
Goalies
Markus Ketterer
Referee:
(Switzerland) Christian Frey
Linesmen:
(Canada) Jim Carmen
(Unified Team at the Olympics) Shamil Sharikov

C. J. Young (J. Sacco) — 18:44	1–0
	1—1	29:42 — M. Mäkelä (P. Skriko)
T. Sweeney (C. J. Young, C. Donatelli) — 33:55	2—1
S. Hill (C. J. Young) (PP) — 49:52	3—1
C. J. Young (SH) — 53:08	4—1

6 min
Penalties
6 min
25
Shots
30

13 February 1992; 20:15	Sweden	3–1 (3–1, 0–0, 0–0)	Germany	Méribel Ice Palace, Méribel; Attendance: 5,528

Roger Nordström
Goalies
Josef Heiß
Referee:
(Canada) Georg McCorry
Linesmen:
(Czechoslovakia) Miloš Benek
(France) Jean-Christophe Benoist

B. Salming (M. Näslund) — 4:04	1–0
	1—1	6:22 — M. Rumrich (R. Amann, G. Holzmann) (PP)
M. Johansson (J. Viktorsson, C. Berglund — 18:14	2—1
P. Erickson (M. Näslund) — 18:59	3—1

6 min
Penalties
6 min
24
Shots
15

15 February 1992; 13:00	Italy	2–5 (0–2, 2–0, 0–3)	Germany	Méribel Ice Palace, Méribel; Attendance: 5,343

David Delfino
Michael Zanier
Goalies
Helmut de Raaf
Referee:
(Unified Team at the Olympics) Nikolay Morozov
Linesmen:
(Canada) Jim Carmen
(France) Jean-Phillippe Ollier

	0–1	2:23 — M. Rumrich (G. Holzmann)
	0—2	10:16 — M. Rumrich
R. Morocco (J. Camazzola) — 30:04	1—2
S. Pellegrino — 33:11	2—2
	2—3	49:50 — R. Fischer (G. Truntschka)
	2—4	58:05 — M. Rumrich
	2—5	59:54 — P. Draisaitl (D. Hegen) (EN, SH)

18 min
Penalties
8 min
28
Shots
39

15 February 1992; 16:30	Sweden	2–2 (1–0, 0–1, 1–1)	Finland	Méribel Ice Palace, Méribel; Attendance: 6,100

Tommy Söderström
Goalies
Jukka Tammi
Referee:
(United States) Donald Adam
Linesmen:
(United States) John Malinovski
(Unified Team at the Olympics) Shamil Sharikov

M. Näslund (D. Rydmark) — 3:32	1–0
	1—1	21:34 — M. Nieminen (T. Selänne, P. Skriko)
	1—2	42:27 — P. Skriko (M. Mäkelä, R. Helminen)
T. Rundqvist (H. Loob) — 55:38	2—2

10 min
Penalties
10 min
37
Shots
18

15 February 1992; 20:15	United States	3–0 (0–0, 2–0, 1–0)	Poland	Méribel Ice Palace, Méribel; Attendance: 6,100

Ray LeBlanc
Goalies
Mariusz Kieca
Marek Batkiewicz
Referee:
(France) Eric Malletroit
Linesmen:
(Czechoslovakia) Miloš Benek
(France) Jean-Christophe Benoist

S. McEachern (S. Young, J. Sacco) — 34:37	1–0
T. Sweeney (S. Lachance) — 37:39	2—0
M. McInnis (S. Heinze) — 53:07	3—0

8 min
Penalties
6 min
37
Shots
24

17 February 1992; 13:00	Germany	4–0 (1–0, 1–0, 2–0)	Poland	Méribel Ice Palace, Méribel; Attendance: 6,100

Helmut de Raaf
Goalies
Mariusz Kieca
Referee:
(Sweden) Sven-Erik Sold
Linesmen:
(Norway) Erik Larssen
(Italy) Thomas Gasser

D. Hegen (G. Truntschka, A. Brockmann) — 4:04	1–0
E. Köpf, Jr. (G. Truntschka) — 27:31	2—0
E. Köpf, Jr. (R. Fischer, T. Brandl) (PP) — 49:55	3—0
A. Brockmann (D. Hegen, J. Mayr) — 51:44	4—0

8 min
Penalties
14 min
27
Shots
21

17 February 1992; 16:30	Finland	5–3 (3–0, 0–1, 2–2)	Italy	Méribel Ice Palace, Méribel; Attendance: 6,100

Markus Ketterer
Goalies
Michael Zanier
Referee:
(Unified Team at the Olympics) Nikolay Morozov
Linesmen:
(Unified Team at the Olympics) Shamil Sharikov
(Sweden) Johan Enestedt

T. Selänne (P. Skriko) — 3:57	1–0
H. Järvenpää (T. Jutila, R. Helminen) (PP) — 14:25	2—0
P. Tuomisto (K. Eloranta, J. Lindroos) — 15:24	3—0
	3—1	28:58 — E. Iovio (R. Morocco, B. Zarrillo) (PP)
T. Jutila (T. Selänne) (PP) — 40:24	4—1
	4—2	42:21 — J. Foglietta (J. Vecchiarelli, R. Oberrauch
R. Summanen — 54:24	5—2
	5—3	54:24 — J. Foglietta (J. Vecchiarelli)

20 min
Penalties
30 min
28
Shots
39

17 February 1992; 20:15	Sweden	3–3 (0–1, 0–1, 3–1)	United States	Méribel Ice Palace, Méribel; Attendance: 6,100

Roger Nordström
Goalies
Ray LeBlanc
Referee:
(Finland) Seppo Makela
Linesmen:
(Germany) Richard Schutz
(Canada) Jim Carmen

	0—1	46:21 — T. Sjödin (H. Loob)
	0—2	53:25 — H. Loob (T. Rundqvist)
	0—3	59:39 — M. Johansson
C. Donatelli (T. Sweeney) — 0:36	1—3
T. Donato (T. Sweeney) — 27:18	2—3
M. McInnis (T. Donato) — 42:42	3—3

31 min
Penalties
16 min
48
Shots
19

=== Group B ===
Pos	Team	Pld	W	D	L	GF	GA	GD	Pts	Qualification
1	Canada	5	4	0	1	28	9	+19	8 (Note: Canada 2 Pts, +3GD; United Team 2 Pts 0GD; Czechoslovakia 2 Pts, –3GD)	Quarterfinals
2	Unified Team	5	4	0	1	32	10	+22	8	Quarterfinals
3	Czechoslovakia	5	4	0	1	25	15	+10	8	Quarterfinals
4	France (H)	5	2	0	3	14	22	−8	4	Quarterfinals
5	Switzerland	5	1	0	4	13	25	−12	2	consolation round
6	Norway	5	0	0	5	7	38	−31	0	consolation round

Source: HockeyCanada.ca, Olympedia
(H) Hosts
Notes:

All times are local (UTC+1).

8 February 1992; 13:00	Canada	3–2 (1–1, 2–0, 0–1)	France	Méribel Ice Palace, Méribel; Attendance: 5,100

Sean Burke
Goalies
Petri Ylönen
Referee:
(Unified Team at the Olympics) Nikolay Morozov
Linesmen:
(Czechoslovakia) Miloš Benek
(Sweden) Johan Enestedt

J. Juneau (T. Brost) — 7:05	1–0
	1—1	17:11 — S. Barin (P. Dunn, B. Laporte)
D. Archibald (PP) — 20:50	2—1
K. Manderville (A. Plavsic, P. Lebeau) — 22:41	3—1
	3—2	40:59 — S. Barin (P. Almasy)

18 min
Penalties
14 min
19
Shots
29

8 February 1992; 16:30	Czechoslovakia	10–1 (4–0, 5–1, 1–0)	Norway	Méribel Ice Palace, Méribel; Attendance: 3,245

Petr Bříza
Goalies
Steve Allman
Jim Marthinsen
Referee:
(Canada) Georg McCorry
Linesmen:
(Canada) Jim Carmen
(Finland) Janne Rautavuori

O. Janecký (L. Lubina) — 4:25	1–0
R. Žemlička (P. Hrbek) — 7:14	2—0
T. Jelínek (L. Lubina) — 7:59	3—0
L. Lubina (O. Janecký, T. Jelínek) (PP) — 16:21	4—0
	4—1	24:44 — T. Johansen (Ø. Løvdal)
P. Rosol (K. Kašťák) — 28:50	5—1
R. Švehla (I. Liba, P. Augusta) — 31:40	6—1
P. Rosol (K. Kašťák, R. Lang) — 33:14	7—1
R. Ťoupal (R. Žemlička, P. Hrbek) — 34:02	8—1
P. Rosol (R. Lang) — 37:04	9—1
J. Šlégr (R. Lang) — 42:33	10—1

14 min
Penalties
8 min
38
Shots
14

8 February 1992; 20:15	Unified Team	8–1 (3–0, 3–0, 2–1)	Switzerland	Méribel Ice Palace, Méribel; Attendance: 3,925

Mikhail Shtalenkov
Andrey Trefilov
Goalies
Reto Pavoni
Referee:
(Sweden) Sven-Erik Sold
Linesmen:
(United States) John Malinovski
(Germany) Richard Schutz

I. Boldin (PP) — 5:53	1–0
V. Prokhorov — 12:16	2—0
V. Malakhov (PP) — 18:17	3—0
S. Petrenko — 27:19	4—0
N. Borshchevsky — 34:37	5—0
Y. Khmylyov (PP) — 38:11	6—0
A. Khomutov — 44:35	7—0
V. Bykov (A. Khomutov, Y. Khmylyov) (PP) — 47:52	8—0
	8—1	52:19 — S. Balmer (P. Howald)

12 min
Penalties
16 min
40
Shots
19

10 February 1992; 13:00	Unified Team	8–1 (3–0, 2–0, 3–1)	Norway	Méribel Ice Palace, Méribel; Attendance: 6,100

Mikhail Shtalenkov
Andrey Trefilov
Goalies
Jim Marthinsen
Referee:
(Czechoslovakia) Jiří Lipa
Linesmen:
(Italy) Thomas Gasser
(Germany) Richard Schutz

D. Mironov — 3:50	1–0
A. Khomutov (Y. Khmylyov, V. Bykov) — 6:56	2—0
N. Borshchevsky — 12:28	3—0
Y. Khmylyov (V. Bykov, A. Khomutov) (PP) — 27:32	4—0
V. Malakhov (A. Khomutov) (PP) — 32:13	5—0
A. Khomutov (I. Kravchuk) — 44:27	6—0
N. Borshchevsky (I. Boldin) — 52:01	7—0
Y. Davydov — 55:58	8—0
	8—1	59:54 — P. Thoresen (G. Hoff)

10 min
Penalties
16 min
55
Shots
11

10 February 1992; 16:30	Czechoslovakia	6–4 (0–2, 4–1, 2–1)	France	Méribel Ice Palace, Méribel; Attendance: 6,100

Petr Bříza
Goalies
Petri Ylönen
Referee:
(Sweden) Sven-Erik Sold
Linesmen:
(United States) John Malinovski
(Unified Team at the Olympics) Shamil Sharikov

	0—1	5:00 — A. Briand (B. Laporte) (PP)
	0—2	5:36 — A. Richer (SH)
P. Hrbek (B. Ščerban, R. Šmehlík) (PP) — 23:27	1—2
M. Hořava (K. Kašťák) — 32:40	2—2
O. Janecký (D. Kadlec) — 34:41	3—2
I. Liba (P. Augusta) — 35:21	4—2
	4—3	39:58 — P. Almasy (C. Ville, S. Barin)
O. Janecký — 43:44	5—3
P. Rosol (R. Lang) — 45:29	6—3
	6—4	47:36 — P. Almasy (PP)

18 min
Penalties
18 min
20
Shots
34

10 February 1992; 20:15	Canada	6–1 (1–0, 4–0, 1–1)	Switzerland	Méribel Ice Palace, Méribel; Attendance: 5,342

Sean Burke
Goalies
Renato Tosio
Referee:
(United States) Donald Adam
Linesmen:
(Norway) Erik Larssen
(Finland) Janne Rautavuori

E. Lindros (J. Juneau) (PP) — 3:18	1–0
J. Juneau (R. Smith, J. Woolley) — 24:06	2—0
E. Lindros (G. Hynes, D. Hannan) — 25:47	3—0
W. Schreiber (E. Lindros, P. Lebeau) — 27:44	4—0
J. Juneau (C. Lindberg, R. Smith) — 35:43	5—0
	5—1	40:47 — J. Eberle (T. Vrabec, F. Lüthi)
G. Hynes (R. Smith, E. Lindros) — 58:19	6—1

20 min
Penalties
20 min
37
Shots
20

12 February 1992; 13:00	Canada	10–0 (3–0, 3–0, 4–0)	Norway	Méribel Ice Palace, Méribel; Attendance: 5,116

Trevor Kidd
Goalies
Rob Schistad
Referee:
(Germany) Bernhard Schneider
Linesmen:
(Italy) Thomas Gasser
(United States) John Malinovski

D. Archibald (D. Hannan, A. Plavsic) — 1:57	1–0
D. Archibald (E. Lindros, D. Hannan) — 6:35	2—0
W. Schreiber (K. Manderville, E. Lindros) — 19:41	3—0
R. Smith (C. Lindberg, B. Schlegel) — 20:24	4—0
P. Lebeau (R. Smith, J. Juneau) (PP) — 30:02	5—0
K. Dahl (J. Juneau) — 33:39	6—0
F. Joseph (W. Schreiber, J. Juneau) — 46:25	7—0
E. Lindros (P. Lebeau, C. Lindberg) — 48:37	8—0
G. Hynes (T. Brost) — 50:26	9—0
G. Hynes (J. Juneau, R. Smith) — 59:50	10—0

14 min
Penalties
8 min
37
Shots
19

12 February 1992; 16:30	Switzerland	3–4 (2–1, 1–2, 0–1)	France	Méribel Ice Palace, Méribel; Attendance: 6,102

Renato Tosio
Goalies
Petri Ylönen
Referee:
(Finland) Seppo Makela
Linesmen:
(Finland) Janne Rautavuori
(Germany) Richard Schutz

S. Balmer (J. Eberle) (PP) — 12:26	1–0
M. Rottaris (K. Fair) — 13:28	2—0
	2—1	18:29 — C. Ville (P. Bozon, A. Richer) (PP)
	2—2	27:37 — P. Almasy (C. Ville)
	2—3	32:52 — P. Bozon (C. Ville, A. Richer) (PP)
T. Vrabec (K. Fair) (PP) — 38:14	3—3
	3—4	56:42 — S. Barin

14 min
Penalties
12 min
24
Shots
31

12 February 1992; 20:15	Unified Team	3–4 (1–2, 1–0, 1–2)	Czechoslovakia	Méribel Ice Palace, Méribel; Attendance: 6,100

Mikhail Shtalenkov
Goalies
Petr Bříza
Referee:
(Canada) Georg McCorry
Linesmen:
(France) Jean-Phillippe Ollier
(Sweden) Johan Enestedt

I. Kravchuk (I. Boldin, N. Borshchevsky) (PP) — 13:46	1–0
	1—1	15:25 — R. Lang (L. Gudas, D. Kadlec) (PP)
	1—2	17:51 — P. Augusta (L. Lubina)
D. Yushkevich (S. Petrenko) (PP) — 30:37	2—2
	2—3	45:48 — R. Lang (P. Rosol, K. Kašťák) (PP)
N. Borshchevsky (I. Boldin) (PP) — 51:48	3—3
	3—4	56:42 — P. Rosol (R. Lang)

8 min
Penalties
24 min
27
Shots
32

14 February 1992; 13:00	Unified Team	8–0 (2–0, 4–0, 2–0)	France	Méribel Ice Palace, Méribel; Attendance: 6,100

Mikhail Shtalenkov
Andrey Trefilov
Goalies
Jean-Marc Djian
Referee:
(Czechoslovakia) Jiří Lipa
Linesmen:
(Italy) Thomas Gasser
(Norway) Erik Larssen

V. Prokhorov (I. Boldin) (PP) — 5:42	1–0
N. Borshchevsky (I. Boldin) — 8:47	2—0
A. Khomutov (Y. Khmylyov) — 21:20	3—0
A. Khomutov (V. Bykov, Y. Davydov) (PP) — 24:46	4—0
D. Mironov (D. Kasparaitis, A. Kovalyov) — 35:28	5—0
Y. Davydov (V. Bykov, A. Khomutov) — 37:36	6—0
A. Zhitnik (A. Zhamnov) — 43:30	7—0
A. Kovalenko (Y. Khmylyov) (SH) — 49:11	8—0

6 min
Penalties
6 min
51
Shots
11

14 February 1992; 16:30	Switzerland	6–3 (0–1, 1–1, 5–1)	Norway	Méribel Ice Palace, Méribel; Attendance: 4,972

Renato Tosio
Goalies
Jim Marthinsen
Referee:
(Unified Team at the Olympics) Nikolay Morozov
Linesmen:
(France) Jean-Phillippe Ollier
(Sweden) Johan Enestedt

	0–1	10:06 — C. Gundersen (G. Hoff)
	0—2	22:15 – T. Johansen (J-M. Karlstad)
P. Howald (PP) — 26:54	1—2
K. Fair (A. Beutler, P. Howald) — 45:33	2—2
J. Eberle — 45:53	3—2
	3—3	46:20 — E. Paulsen (J. Friis)
G. Montandon — 47:38	4—3
K. Fair — 51:21	5—3
P. Howald — 55:07	6—3

12 min
Penalties
10 min
40
Shots
22

14 February 1992; 20:15	Canada	5–1 (1–0, 2–1, 2–0)	Czechoslovakia	Méribel Ice Palace, Méribel; Attendance: 6,100

Sean Burke
Goalies
Petr Bříza
Referee:
(Finland) Seppo Makela
Linesmen:
(Finland) Janne Rautavuori
(Germany) Richard Schutz

J. Juneau (E. Lindros, R. Smith) (PP) — 3:33	1—0
D. Archibald (J. Juneau, E. Lindros) (PP) — 30:12	2—0
J. Juneau (G. Hynes) — 36:46	3—0
	3—1	39:37 — K. Kašťák (R. Lang) (PP)
D. Hannan (D. Tippett, K. Manderville) — 41:35	4—1
D. Archibald (J. Woolley) (PP) — 55:23	5—1

26 min
Penalties
8 min
31
Shots
34

16 February 1992; 13:00	Norway	2–4 (0–1, 0–0, 2–3)	France	Méribel Ice Palace, Méribel; Attendance: 6,100

Rob Schistad
Goalies
Petri Ylönen
Referee:
(Czechoslovakia) Jiří Lipa
Linesmen:
(Czechoslovakia) Miloš Benek
(Finland) Janne Rautavuori

	0—1	1:40 — P. Dunn (B. Saunier, B. Laporte)
	0—2	44:14 — P. Bozon (P. Almasy, S. Poudrier) (PP)
G. Hoff (P. Salsten) (PP) — 45:32	1—2
	1—3	49:39 — P. Dunn (S. Barin, B. Laporte)
M. Rath — 54:22	2—3
	2—4	59:46 — P. Bozon (EN)

14 min
Penalties
16 min
22
Shots
28

16 February 1992; 16:30	Czechoslovakia	4–2 (1–1, 1–1, 2–0)	Switzerland	Méribel Ice Palace, Méribel; Attendance: 6,100

Oldřich Svoboda
Goalies
Renato Tosio
Referee:
(Canada) Georg McCorry
Linesmen:
(France) Jean-Christophe Benoist
(Unified Team at the Olympics) Shamil Sharikov

	0—1	7:58 — P. Howald (G. Montandon, K. Fair)
P. Rosol (R. Lang) — 13:52	1—1
	1—2	26:08 — M. Celio (A. Rötheli)
R. Lang (J. Šlégr) — 38:58	2—2
P. Veselovský (R. Švehla, I. Liba) — 55:43	3—2
L. Lubina (O. Janecký, T. Jelínek) — 57:18	4—2

6 min
Penalties
12 min
37
Shots
27

16 February 1992; 20:15	Canada	4–5 (2–3, 0–1, 2–1)	Unified Team	Méribel Ice Palace, Méribel; Attendance: 6,100

Sean Burke
Goalies
Mikhail Shtalenkov
Referee:
(United States) Donald Adam
Linesmen:
(United States) John Malinovski
(Sweden) Johan Enestedt

	0—1	8:05 — D. Mironov (V. Bykov, I. Kravchuk) (PP)
D. Archibald (G. Hynes) — 11:03	1—1
E. Lindros — 13:22	2—1
	2—2	14:35 — N. Borshchevsky (V. Prokhorov)
	2—3	15:20 — S. Petrenko (A. Zhamnov, D. Mironov)
	2—4	34:33 — I. Kravchuk (V. Butsayev, Y. Khmylyov)
D. Tippett (D. Hannan) — 43:39	3—4
D. Hannan (T. Brost, D. Tippett) — 48:50	4—4
	4—5	52:44 — I. Kravchuk (Y. Khmylyov)

12 min
Penalties
8 min
19
Shots
52

== Consolation round ==
=== Bracket ===
9–12th-place semifinals
18 February
Italy	3
Norway	5
19 February
Switzerland	7
Poland	2

9th-place game
21 February
Norway	5
Switzerland	2
11th-place game
20 February
Italy	1
Poland	4

=== 9–12th-place semifinals ===
18 February 1992; 13:00	Italy	3–5 (1–1, 1–2, 1–2)	Norway	Méribel Ice Palace, Méribel; Attendance: 2,023

David Delfino
Goalies
Jim Marthinsen
Referee:
(Switzerland) Christian Frey
Linesmen:
(Czechoslovakia) Miloš Benek
(France) Jean-Christophe Benoist

L. Topatigh (B. Zarrillo, B. Manno) (PP) — 9:09	1–0
	1—1	13:20 — M. Rath
J. Foglietta (J. Vecchiarelli) — 21:33	2—1
	2—2	29:01 — M. Rath
	2—3	29:27 — O.-E. Dahlstrøm (M. Rath)
J. Vecchiarelli (J. Foglietta) — 54:33	3—3
	3—4	59:11 — O.-E. Dahlstrøm (P. Salsten) (PP)
	3—5	59:54 — G. Hoff (O.-E. Dahlstrøm) (EN)

22 min
Penalties
12 min
40
Shots
23

19 February 1992; 13:00	Switzerland	7–2 (1–0, 2–2, 4–0)	Poland	Méribel Ice Palace, Méribel; Attendance: 5,022

Renato Tosio
Goalies
Mariusz Kieca
Referee:
(Czechoslovakia) Jiří Lipa
Linesmen:
(France) Jean-Phillippe Ollier
(Italy) Thomas Gasser

P. Jaks (G. Montandon, P. Howald) — 10:40	1–0
F. Lüthi — 22:43	2—0
P. Brasey (F. Lüthi, S. Bertaggia) — 23:21	3—0
	3—1	28:52 — J. Hajnos (M. Tomasik, H. Gruth)
	3—2	39:20 — K. Jurek (M. Tomasik, M. Cholewa) (PP)
S. Leuenberger (J. Eberle, T. Vrabec) — 43:26	4—2
M. Rottaris (M. Brodmann, K. Fair) — 47:08	5—2
S. Balmer (M. Brodmann, M. Rottaris) (PP) — 54:09	6–2
M. Brodmann (K. Fair) — 57:42	7—2

14 min
Penalties
14 min
40
Shots
36

=== 11th-place game ===
20 February 1992; 13:00	Italy	1–4 (0–3, 1–0, 0—1)	Poland	Méribel Ice Palace, Méribel; Attendance: 2,144

David Delfino
Goalies
Marek Batkiewicz
Referee:
(Germany) Bernhard Schneider
Linesmen:
(Canada) Jim Carmen
(Norway) Erik Larssen

	0–1	4:59 — J. Adamiec (R. Szopiński, H. Gruth)
	0—2	7:07 — M. Tomasik (K. Jurek)
	0—3	8:33 — M. Puzio (H. Gruth, M. Czerkawski)
J. Foglietta (E. Iovio, B. Stewart) (SH) — 32:19	1—3
	1—4	45:31 — J. Adamiec (M. Cholewa, D. Garbocz) (PP)

12 min
Penalties
6 min
28
Shots
24

=== 9th-place game ===
21 February 1992; 13:00	Norway	5–2 (2–0, 0–1, 3–1)	Switzerland	Méribel Ice Palace, Méribel; Attendance: 3,271

Jim Marthinsen
Goalies
Renato Tosio
Referee:
(France) Eric Malletroit
Linesmen:
(Czechoslovakia) Miloš Benek
(France) Jean-Christophe Benoist

M. Rath (T. Jakobsen) — 3:59	1–0
P. Salsten (P. Thoresen) — 9:52	2—0
	2—1	37:34 — M. Brodmann (S. Bertaggia)
E. Paulsen (A. Billkvam) — 42:18	3—1
E. Kristiansen (E. Paulsen) — 42:40	4—1
	4—2	43:07 — P. Howald
O.-E. Dahlstrøm (SH) — 49:56	5—2

10 min
Penalties
10 min
25
Shots
28

== Final round ==
=== Bracket ===
Gold medal game, starting line-ups

Quarterfinals
February 18
Canada (GWS)	4
Germany	3
February 19
Sweden	1
Czechoslovakia	3
February 19
Unified Team	6
Finland	1
February 18
France	1
United States	4

Semifinals
February 21
Canada	4
Czechoslovakia	2
February 21
Unified Team	5
United States	2

Gold-medal game
February 23
Canada	1
Unified Team	3
Bronze-medal game
February 22
Czechoslovakia	6
United States	1

5–8th-place semifinals
February 20
Sweden	3
Finland	2
February 20
Germany	5
France	4

Fifth-place game
February 22
Sweden	4
Germany	3
Seventh-place game
February 22
Finland	4
France	1

=== Quarter-finals ===
18 February 1992; 17:00	Canada	4–3 (GWS) (1–2, 1–0, 1–1, 0–0) (SO: 1–0)	Germany	Méribel Ice Palace, Méribel; Attendance: 6,100

Sean Burke
Goalies
Helmut de Raaf
Referee:
(Finland) Seppo Makela
Linesmen:
(United States) John Malinovski
(Italy) Thomas Gasser

J. Juneau (C. Lindberg, J. Woolley) (PP) — 9:38	1—0
	1—1	12:40 — J. Rumrich (G. Holzmann)
	1–2	16:34 — D. Hegen (A. Brockmann, G. Truntschka)
B. Schlegel (W. Schreiber, D. Archibald) — 20:28	2—2
K. Dahl (J. Juneau, R. Smith) — 53:54	3—2
	3—3	57:38 — E. Kopf Jr. (R. Fischer)

E. Lindros (miss)
D. Archibald (miss)
J. Woolley
W. Schreiber
J. Juneau (miss)
E. Lindros
Shootout
(miss) P. Draisaitl
(miss) D. Hegen
(miss) G. Truntschka
M. Rumrich
A. Brockmann
(miss) P. Draisaitl
0 min
Penalties
6 min
45
Shots
30

18 February 1992; 21:00	France	1–4 (1–0, 0–3, 0–1)	United States	Méribel Ice Palace, Méribel; Attendance: 6,100

Petri Ylönen
Goalies
Ray LeBlanc
Referee:
(Canada) Georg McCorry
Linesmen:
(Germany) Richard Schutz
(Norway) Erik Larssen

S. Barin — 11:01	1—0
	1—1	25:43 — K. Tkachuk (PP)
	1—2	28:13 — T. Donato (M. McInnis)
	1—3	31:29 — T. Donato (M. McInnis, S. Heinze)
	1—4	46:29 — M. McInnis (T. Donato)

8 min
Penalties
20 min
36
Shots
15

19 February 1992; 17:00	Unified Team	6–1 (2–1, 2–0, 2–0)	Finland	Méribel Ice Palace, Méribel; Attendance: 6,100

Mikhail Shtalenkov
Andrey Trefilov
Goalies
Jukka Tammi
Referee:
(United States) Donald Adam
Linesmen:
(United States) John Malinovski
(Sweden) Johan Enestedt

N. Borshchevsky (I. Boldin, V. Prokhorov) — 5:42	1—0
	1-1	8:25 — P. Tuomisto (K. Eloranta, J. Lindroos)
A. Khomutov (V. Bykov, Y. Davydov) (PP) — 17:36	2—1
Y. Khmylyov - 34:50	3—1
V. Malakhov (V. Prokhorov, S. Zubov) — 37:12	4—1
V. Bykov (A. Khomutov, D. Kasparaitis) — 47:21	5—1
S. Petrenko (A. Zhamnov, A. Kovalev) — 58:35	6—1

10 min
Penalties
18 min
36
Shots
31

19 February 1992; 21:00	Sweden	1–3 (1–1, 0–0, 0–2)	Czechoslovakia	Méribel Ice Palace, Méribel; Attendance: 6,100

Tommy Söderström
Goalies
Petr Bříza
Referee:
(Canada) Georg McCorry
Linesmen:
(Unified Team at the Olympics) Shamil Sharikov
(Canada) Jim Carmen

M. Johansson (K. Kennholt) — 5:00	1—0
	1—1	18:46 — D. Kadlec (P. Rosol)
	1—2	53:05 — O. Janecký (P. Bříza)
	1—3	57:43 — P. Augusta (P. Hrbek)

6 min
Penalties
8 min
30
Shots
22

=== 5–8th-place semifinals ===
20 February 1992; 17:00	Germany	5–4 (1–0, 3–3, 1–1)	France	Méribel Ice Palace, Méribel; Attendance: 6,100

Josef Heiß
Goalies
Petri Ylönen
Referee:
(Switzerland) Christian Frey
Linesmen:
(Sweden) Johan Enestedt
(Italy) Thomas Gasser

G. Truntschka (T. Brandl) — 7:19	1—0
G. Truntschka (D. Hegen) — 27:36	2—0
	2—1	29:59 — B. Laporte (P. Dunn, A. Briand)
	2—2	31:35 — C. Ville (P. Almasy)
D. Hegen (G. Truntschka) (PP) — 32:52	3—2
G. Holzmann (A. Niederberger) (PP) — 33:35	4—2
	4—3	38:25 — C. Ville (D. Perez)
D. Hegen — 40:38	5—3
	5—4	55:52 — C. Ville (P. Bozon, S. Poudrier) (PP)

10 min
Penalties
10 min
25
Shots
31

20 February 1992; 21:00	Sweden	3–2 (2–0, 1–1, 0–1)	Finland	Méribel Ice Palace, Méribel; Attendance: 5,200

Roger Nordström
Goalies
Jukka Tammi
Referee:
(Unified Team at the Olympics) Nikolay Morozov
Linesmen:
(United States) John Malinovski
(Unified Team at the Olympics) Shamil Sharikov

L. Edström (P. Andersson) — 8:14	1—0
B. Salming (P. Kjellberg) (PP) — 15:23	2—0
T. Rundqvist (P. Kjellberg) (PP) — 25:04	3—0
	3—1	39:57 — M. Nieminen (PP)
	3—2	55:41 — T. Selänne

12 min
Penalties
8 min
24
Shots
25

=== Semi-finals ===
21 February 1992; 17:00	Unified Team	5–2 (2–1, 0–1, 3–0)	United States	Méribel Ice Palace, Méribel; Attendance: 6,100

Mikhail Shtalenkov
Goalies
Ray LeBlanc
Referee:
(Sweden) Sven-Erik Sold
Linesmen:
(Canada) Jim Carmen
(Sweden) Johan Enestedt

A. Kovalev (D. Yushkevich) — 11:08	1—0
	1—1	12:09 — S. Hill
V. Bykov (S. Petrenko, D. Yushkevich) — 15:36	2—1
	2—2	38:28 — M. McInnis
A. Khomutov (PP) — 50:55	3—2
Y. Khmylyov (V. Bykov, A. Khomutov) — 54:08	4—2
Y. Davydov (A. Kovalenko) (PP) — 57:09	5—2

6 min
Penalties
16 min
55
Shots
18

21 February 1992; 21:00	Canada	4–2 (2–1, 0–1, 2–0)	Czechoslovakia	Méribel Ice Palace, Méribel; Attendance: 6,100

Sean Burke
Goalies
Petr Bříza
Referee:
(United States) Donald Adam
Linesmen:
(Finland) Janne Rautavuori
(Unified Team at the Olympics) Shamil Sharikov

D. Hannan — 1:58	1—0
D. Archibald (J. Woolley, B. Schlegel) — 10:43	2—0
	2—1	19:52 — R. Švehla (R. Žemlička)
	2—2	23:22 — P. Augusta (R. Žemlička, P. Hrbek)
C. Giles (F. Joseph, J. Juneau) — 43:59	3—2
F. Joseph (T. Brost, D. Hannan) — 57:48	4—2

10 min
Penalties
6 min
31
Shots
33

=== Seventh-place game ===
22 February 1992; 13:00	Finland	4–1 (0–0, 2–0, 2–1)	France	Méribel Ice Palace, Méribel; Attendance: 5,150

Jukka Tammi
Goalies
Petri Ylönen
Referee:
(Czechoslovakia) Jiří Lipa
Linesmen:
(United States) John Malinovski
(Germany) Richard Schutz

T. Selänne (H. Järvenpää) (PP) — 24:28	1—0
M. Nieminen (V. Sirén, T. Selänne) — 30:37	2—0
H. Järvenpää (PP) — 46:26	3—0
K. Säilynoja (T. Blomqvist) — 51:17	4—0
	4—1	57:30 — P. Dunn (S. Botteri)

12 min
Penalties
12 min
32
Shots
19

=== Fifth-place game ===
22 February 1992; 17:00	Sweden	4–3 (0–2, 1–0, 3–1)	Germany	Méribel Ice Palace, Méribel; Attendance: 5,017

Tommy Söderström
Goalies
Josef Heiß
Referee:
(United States) Donald Adam
Linesmen:
(Unified Team at the Olympics) Shamil Sharikov
(Canada) Jim Carmen

	0—1	12:09 — A. Brockmann (E. Köpf Jr.)
	0—2	18:27 — G. Holzmann (J. Rumrich, R. Fischer)
P. Andersson (M. Näslund, T. Rundqvist) — 12:09	1—2
T. Sjödin (P. Erickson, B. Salming) (PP) — 43:28	2—2
	2—3	46:50 — P. Draisaitl (U. Hiemer)
T. Rundqvist (H. Loob, T. Söderström) — 49:19	3—3
P. Carnbäck (T. Sjödin) — 49:59	4—3

2 min
Penalties
4 min
24
Shots
18

=== Bronze-medal game ===
22 February 1992; 21:00	Czechoslovakia	6–1 (2–0, 1–0, 3–1)	United States	Méribel Ice Palace, Méribel; Attendance: 6,100

Petr Bříza
Goalies
Ray LeBlanc
Scott Gordon
Referee:
(Canada) Georg McCorry
Linesmen:
(Finland) Janne Rautavuori
(Sweden) Johan Enestedt

F. Procházka (D. Kadlec, R. Lang) — 16:12	1—0
T. Jelínek (L. Lubina, O. Janecký) — 17:23	2—0
K. Kašťák (D. Kadlec) — 25:51	3—0
T. Jelínek (R. Žemlička, L. Gudas) — 42:38	4—0
R. Lang (K. Kašťák) — 43:42	5—0
	5—1	46:55 — T. Drury (D. Emma)
R. Lang (F. Procházka) — 55:59	6—1

6 min
Penalties
8 min
47
Shots
29

=== Gold-medal game ===
23 February 1992; 14:15	Canada	1–3 (0–0, 0–0, 1–3)	Unified Team	Méribel Ice Palace, Méribel; Attendance: 6,100

Sean Burke
Goalies
Mikhail Shtalenkov
Referee:
(Sweden) Sven-Erik Sold
Linesmen:
(Finland) Janne Rautavuori
(Sweden) Johan Enestedt

	0–1	41:01 — V. Butsayev (Y. Davydov)
	0–2	55:54 — I. Boldin (N. Borshchevsky, V. Prokhorov)
C. Lindberg (J. Juneau, J. Woolley) — 57:20	1–2
	1–3	58:51 — V. Bykov (A. Khomutov)

14 min
Penalties
12 min
22
Shots
37

== Statistics ==
=== Average age ===
Team Germany was the oldest team in the tournament, averaging 28 years and 6 months. Team USA was the youngest team in the tournament, averaging 24 years. Gold medalists Unified Team averaged 24 years and 2 months. Tournament average was 26 years and 4 months.

=== Leading scorers ===
Rk	Name	GP	G	A	Pts
1	(Canada) Joe Juneau	8	6	9	15
2	Andrei Khomutov	8	7	7	14
3	(Czechoslovakia) Robert Lang	8	5	8	13
4	(Finland) Teemu Selänne	8	7	4	11
5	(Canada) Eric Lindros	8	5	6	11
5	(Finland) Hannu Järvenpää	8	5	6	11
7	Vyacheslav Bykov	8	4	7	11
8	Yuri Khmylev	8	4	6	10
8	(Finland) Mika Nieminen	8	4	6	10
10	Nikolai Borschevskiy	8	7	2	9

== Final rankings ==
1. Unified Team
2. Canada
3. Czechoslovakia
4. United States
5. Sweden
6. Germany
7. Finland
8. France
9. Norway
10. Switzerland
11. Poland
12. Italy

== Unified Team medal controversy ==
Russian goaltender Nikolai Khabibulin was the third on the depth chart and never played when the Unified Team won gold in Albertville, France. Instead of giving the gold to someone who did not play, coach Viktor Tikhonov decided to keep it for himself. Only players are given Olympic medals; coaches and management are not. The replacement medal was given to Khabibulin by the International Olympic Committee in a private medal ceremony during the 2002 Winter Olympics in Salt Lake City.
