= Bertaggia =

Bertaggia is a surname. Notable people with this surname include

- Alessio Bertaggia (born 1993), Swiss professional ice hockey player
- Enrico Bertaggia (born 1964), Italian former racing driver
- Sandro Bertaggia (born 1964), former professional ice hockey player
