= Kieca =

Kieca is a surname. Notable people with the surname include:

- Mariusz Kieca (born 1969), Polish ice hockey player
- Michał Kieca (born 1999), Polish professional footballer
