= Robert Ginnetti =

Italian ice hockey player

- Born: July 31, 1965 (age 60) Vancouver, British Columbia, Canada
- Height: 5 ft 10 in (178 cm)
- Weight: 172 lb (78 kg; 12 st 4 lb)
- Position: Center
- Shot: Right
- Played for: GIJS Groningen; HC Alleghe; HC Fiemme Cavalese; HC Milano Saima; Devils Milano; EC Bad Tölz; GEC Nordhorn; ERC Ingolstadt
- National team: Italy
- NHL draft: Undrafted
- Playing career: 1985–1999

Robert Anthony Ginnetti (born 31 July 1965) is a Canadian-born Italian ice hockey player. He competed in the men's tournament at the 1992 Winter Olympics.

== Career statistics ==
| | | | Regular season | | | | | Playoffs |
| Season | Team | League | GP | G | A | Pts | PIM | GP | G | A | Pts | PIM |
|---|---|---|---|---|---|---|---|---|---|---|---|---|
| 1981–82 | Vancouver Bluehawks | BCJHL | 37 | 15 | 34 | 49 | 59 | — | — | — | — | — |
| 1982–83 | Burnaby Bluehawks | BCJHL | 47 | 25 | 50 | 75 | 176 | — | — | — | — | — |
| 1983–84 | New Westminster Bruins | WHL | 21 | 4 | 13 | 17 | 11 | — | — | — | — | — |
| 1983–84 | Seattle Breakers | WHL | 29 | 0 | 6 | 6 | 22 | — | — | — | — | — |
| 1984–85 | Burnaby Bluehawks | BCJHL | 51 | 42 | 111 | 153 | 142 | — | — | — | — | — |
| 1985–86 | GIJS Groningen | Netherlands | 40 | 51 | 50 | 101 | — | — | — | — | — | — |
| 1986–87 | GIJS Groningen | Netherlands | 10 | 12 | 9 | 21 | 8 | 2 | 0 | 0 | 0 | — |
| 1988–89 | HC Alleghe | Italy | 34 | 25 | 42 | 67 | 30 | — | — | — | — | — |
| 1989–90 | HC Fiemme Cavalese | Italy | 42 | 47 | 94 | 141 | 12 | — | — | — | — | — |
| 1990–91 | HC Alleghe | Italy | 35 | 31 | 65 | 96 | 11 | 10 | 3 | 19 | 22 | 2 |
| 1991–92 | HC Alleghe | Italy | 17 | 10 | 26 | 36 | 6 | 9 | 5 | 7 | 12 | 2 |
| 1991–92 | HC Alleghe | Alpenliga | 18 | 16 | 26 | 42 | 12 | — | — | — | — | — |
| 1992–93 | HC Fiemme Cavalese | Italy | 15 | 7 | 18 | 25 | 10 | — | — | — | — | — |
| 1992–93 | HC Fiemme Cavalese | Alpenliga | 30 | 10 | 32 | 42 | 31 | — | — | — | — | — |
| 1993–94 | HC Milano Saima | Italy | 22 | 11 | 30 | 41 | 16 | — | — | — | — | — |
| 1993–94 | HC Milano Saima | Alpenliga | 28 | 22 | 25 | 47 | 36 | — | — | — | — | — |
| 1994–95 | Devils Milano | Italy | 27 | 16 | 35 | 51 | 24 | 2 | 1 | 3 | 4 | 0 |
| 1994–95 | Devils Milano | Alpenliga | 13 | 9 | 21 | 30 | 18 | — | — | — | — | — |
| 1996–97 | EC Bad Tölz | Germany2 | 54 | 26 | 58 | 84 | 84 | — | — | — | — | — |
| 1997–98 | GEC Nordhorn | Germany2 | 55 | 39 | 82 | 121 | 75 | — | — | — | — | — |
| 1998–99 | ERC Ingolstadt | Germany2 | 40 | 14 | 14 | 28 | 26 | — | — | — | — | — |
| Italy totals | | | 192 | 147 | 310 | 457 | 109 | 21 | 9 | 29 | 38 | 4 |
