= Vecchiarelli =

Vecchiarelli is a surname. Notable people with the surname include:

- Carlo Vecchiarelli (1884–1948), Italian general
- John Vecchiarelli (born 1964), Italian ice hockey player
