= Viktorsson =

Viktorsson is a surname. Notable people with the surname include:

- Jan Viktorsson (born 1967), Swedish ice hockey player
- Stina Viktorsson (born 1985), Swedish curler
