= Tomasik =

Tomasik is a Polish surname. Notable people with the name include:

- Brian Tomasik, American researcher and ethicist
- Henryk Tomasik (b. 1946), Polish bishop
- Mirosław Tomasik (b. 1965) Polish ice hockey player
- Piotr Tomasik (b. 1987), Polish footballer

== See also ==
- Tomášik, Czech surname
