= Alfred Lüthi =

Alfred Lüthi may refer to:

- Alfred Lüthi (ice hockey)
- Alfred Lüthi (footballer)
