= Ernst Köpf (ice hockey, born 1968) =

German ice hockey player

- Born: 24 June 1968 (age 57) Augsburg, West Germany
- Height: 5 ft 10 in (178 cm)
- Weight: 181 lb (82 kg; 12 st 13 lb)
- Position: Left wing
- Shot: Left
- Played for: Augsburger EV; Kölner EC; EV Füssen; Düsseldorfer EG; SC Bietigheim-Bissingen
- National team: Germany
- Playing career: 1985–1999

Ernst Köpf Jr. (born 24 June 1968) is a German ice hockey player. He competed in the men's tournament at the 1992 Winter Olympics.

His father Ernst Köpf Sr. won a bronze medal in ice hockey at the 1976 Winter Olympics.

== Career statistics ==
			Regular season					Playoffs
Season	Team	League	GP	G	A	Pts	PIM	GP	G	A	Pts	PIM
1985–86	Augsburger EV	Germany2	5	2	0	2	0	—	—	—	—	—
1986–87	Augsburger EV	Germany2	35	26	28	54	14	12	13	6	19	4
1987–88	Kölner EC	Germany	35	2	3	5	0	11	0	0	0	2
1988–89	Kölner EC	Germany	30	8	7	15	10	9	1	5	6	0
1989–90	Kölner EC	Germany	36	13	17	30	22	8	0	3	3	4
1990–91	Kölner EC	Germany	35	16	12	28	34	13	1	3	4	9
1991–92	EV Füssen	Germany2	1	1	1	2	0	—	—	—	—	—
1991–92	Kölner EC	Germany	43	19	28	47	35	4	1	1	2	2
1992–93	Düsseldorfer EG	Germany	30	16	12	28	14	11	5	7	12	4
1993–94	Düsseldorfer EG	Germany	30	11	23	34	8	12	4	2	6	6
1994–95	Düsseldorfer EG	DEL	10	2	8	10	0	10	1	4	5	2
1995–96	Düsseldorfer EG	DEL	35	3	11	14	16	10	4	1	5	8
1996–97	Düsseldorfer EG	DEL	43	6	11	17	14	4	0	2	2	8
1997–98	SC Bietigheim-Bissingen	Germany2	39	20	35	55	40	—	—	—	—	—
1998–99	Düsseldorfer EG	Germany2	32	13	15	28	16	—	—	—	—	—
DEL totals			88	11	30	41	30	24	5	7	12	18
Germany totals			239	85	102	187	123	68	12	21	33	27
Germany2 totals			112	62	79	141	70	12	13	6	19	4
