= Mariusz Puzio =

Polish ice hockey player

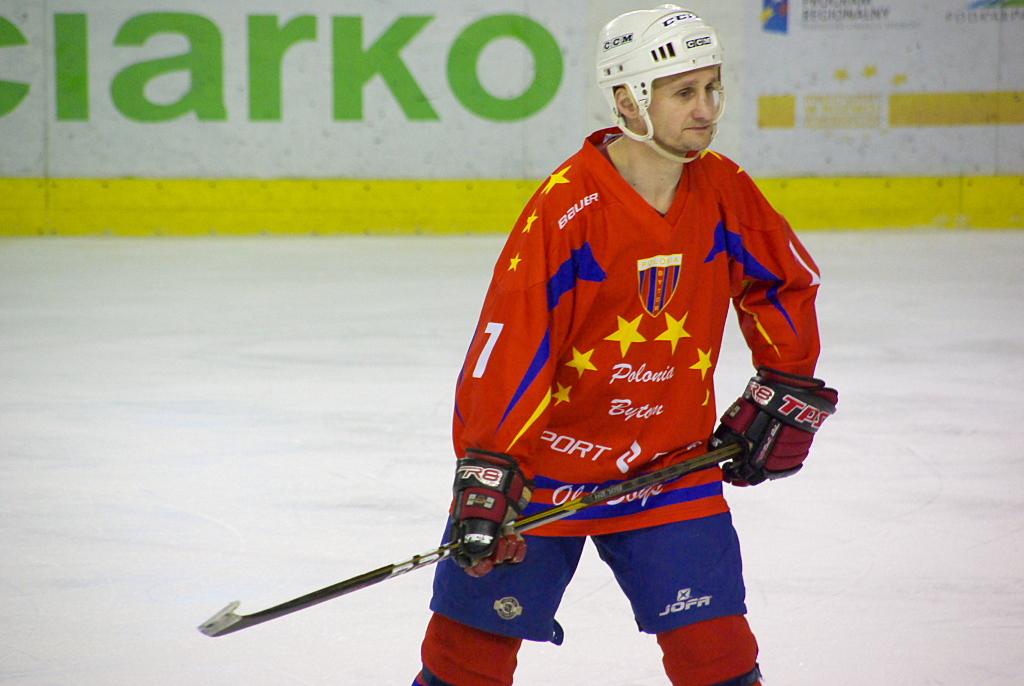
- Puzio in 2012
- Born: 12 March 1966 (age 59); Mysłowice, Poland
- Height: 5 ft 9 in (175 cm)
- Weight: 159 lb (72 kg; 11 st 5 lb)
- Position: Forward
- Shot: Left
- Played for: Polonia Bytom; TKH Toruń; Unia Oświęcim; Zagłębie Sosnowiec
- National team: Poland
- Playing career: 1984–2009

Mariusz Zdzisław Puzio (born 12 March 1966) is a Polish former ice hockey player. He played for Polonia Bytom, TKH Toruń, Unia Oświęcim, and Zagłębie Sosnowiec during his career. He also played for the Polish national team at the 1992 Winter Olympics, and multiple World Championships. In 1992 Puzio led the Polish league in scoring. He holds the record for most games played in Poland, with 758.
