= Mario Rottaris =

Swiss ice hockey player

- Born: February 8, 1968 (age 57); Trub, Switzerland
- Height: 6 ft 2 in (188 cm)
- Weight: 190 lb (86 kg; 13 st 8 lb)
- Position: Centre
- Shot: Left
- Played for: HC Fribourg-Gottéron
- National team: Switzerland
- Playing career: 1985–2003

Mario Rottaris (born February 8, 1968) is a former Swiss professional ice hockey centre who played for HC Fribourg-Gottéron in Switzerland's Nationalliga A.

Rottaris has participated as a member of the Swiss national team in numerous international tournaments, including the 1992 Winter Olympics.

== Career statistics ==
			Regular season					Playoffs
Season	Team	League	GP	G	A	Pts	PIM	GP	G	A	Pts	PIM
1987–88	HC Fribourg-Gottéron	NLA	22	3	0	3	2	—	—	—	—	—
1988–89	HC Fribourg-Gottéron	NLA	34	10	4	14	14	2	2	0	2	2
1989–90	HC Fribourg-Gottéron	NLA	35	9	11	20	10	3	0	0	0	2
1990–91	HC Fribourg-Gottéron	NLA	22	7	5	12	10	8	3	2	5	6
1991–92	HC Fribourg-Gottéron	NLA	25	5	12	17	14	14	5	3	8	10
1992–93	HC Fribourg-Gottéron	NLA	34	4	13	17	26	11	1	3	4	17
1993–94	HC Fribourg-Gottéron	NLA	36	12	13	25	12	11	3	4	7	4
1994–95	HC Fribourg-Gottéron	NLA	35	11	13	24	22	8	2	2	4	4
1995–96	HC Fribourg-Gottéron	NLA	35	13	11	24	20	4	0	6	6	13
1996–97	HC Fribourg-Gottéron	NLA	46	14	14	28	38	3	1	0	1	0
1997–98	HC Fribourg-Gottéron	NLA	40	19	17	36	26	12	5	4	9	8
1998–99	HC Fribourg-Gottéron	NLA	44	9	19	28	42	4	2	6	8	2
1999–00	HC Fribourg-Gottéron	NLA	45	12	22	34	26	3	1	0	1	2
2000–01	HC Fribourg-Gottéron	NLA	44	12	20	32	44	5	0	1	1	2
2001–02	HC Fribourg-Gottéron	NLA	44	13	15	28	18	5	3	1	4	8
2002–03	HC Fribourg-Gottéron	NLA	42	10	10	20	24	—	—	—	—	—
NLA totals			583	163	199	362	348	93	28	32	60	80
