= Patrice Brasey =

Swiss ice hockey player

- Born: January 28, 1964 (age 61); Fribourg, Switzerland
- Height: 6 ft 2 in (188 cm)
- Weight: 190 lb (86 kg; 13 st 8 lb)
- Position: Defenceman
- Shot: Left
- Played for: HC Fribourg-Gottéron; HC Lugano; ZSC Lions; Genève-Servette HC
- National team: Switzerland
- Playing career: 1984–2012

Patrice Brasey (born January 28, 1964, in Fribourg, Switzerland) is a former Swiss ice hockey player. He played in the National League A for HC Fribourg-Gottéron, HC Lugano, ZSC Lions and Genève-Servette HC. He also played for the Switzerland men's national ice hockey team at the 1988 and 1992 Olympics, as well as the 1987 World Ice Hockey Championships.
