= Gord Hynes =

Canadian ice hockey player

- Born: July 22, 1966 (age 59) Montreal, Quebec, Canada
- Height: 6 ft 1 in (185 cm)
- Weight: 170 lb (77 kg; 12 st 2 lb)
- Position: Defence
- Shot: Left
- Played for: Boston Bruins; Philadelphia Flyers
- National team: Canada
- NHL draft: 115th overall, 1985; Boston Bruins
- Playing career: 1986–2002

Gordon Ross Hynes (born July 22, 1966) is a Canadian former professional ice hockey defenceman who played two seasons in the National Hockey League (NHL) with the Boston Bruins and Philadelphia Flyers. Hynes was a member of the Canadian 1992 Winter Olympics ice hockey team, winning a silver medal.

== Career statistics ==
=== Regular season and playoffs ===
			Regular season					Playoffs
Season	Team	League	GP	G	A	Pts	PIM	GP	G	A	Pts	PIM
1983–84	Medicine Hat Tigers	WHL	72	5	14	19	39	14	0	0	0	0
1984–85	Medicine Hat Tigers	WHL	70	18	45	63	61	10	6	9	15	17
1985–86	Medicine Hat Tigers	WHL	58	22	39	61	45	25	8	15	23	32
1986–87	Moncton Golden Flames	AHL	69	2	19	21	21	4	0	0	0	2
1987–88	Maine Mariners	AHL	69	5	30	35	65	7	1	3	4	4
1988–89	Canada	Intl	61	8	38	46	44	—	—	—	—	—
1989–90	Canada	Intl	11	3	1	4	4	—	—	—	—	—
1989–90	HC Varese	ITA	29	13	36	49	16	6	3	3	6	0
1990–91	Canada	Intl	57	12	30	42	62	—	—	—	—	—
1991–92	Canada	Intl	48	12	22	34	50	—	—	—	—	—
1991–92	Boston Bruins	NHL	15	0	5	5	6	12	1	2	3	6
1992–93	Philadelphia Flyers	NHL	37	3	4	7	16	—	—	—	—	—
1992–93	Hershey Bears	AHL	9	1	3	4	4	—	—	—	—	—
1993–94	Cincinnati Cyclones	IHL	80	15	43	58	50	11	2	6	8	24
1994–95	Detroit Vipers	IHL	62	4	35	39	32	—	—	—	—	—
1995–96	SERC Wild Wings	DEL	49	9	32	41	61	4	0	2	2	10
1996–97	SERC Wild Wings	DEL	47	15	41	56	82	—	—	—	—	—
1997–98	Adler Mannheim	DEL	40	5	24	29	95	10	3	4	7	22
1998–99	Adler Mannheim	DEL	52	15	28	43	86	12	1	8	9	14
1999–2000	Adler Mannheim	DEL	50	11	26	37	66	5	1	1	2	4
2000–01	Adler Mannheim	DEL	60	6	21	27	55	12	0	2	2	18
2001–02	Berlin Capitals	DEL	57	5	15	20	76	—	—	—	—	—
AHL totals			147	8	52	60	90	11	1	3	4	6
Intl totals			177	35	91	126	160	—	—	—	—	—
DEL totals			355	66	187	253	521	43	5	17	22	68

=== International ===
Year	Team	Event	GP	G	A	Pts	PIM
1992	Canada	OG	8	3	3	6	6
