= Joe Foglietta =

Italian ice hockey player

Personal information
- Nationality: Italian
- Born: 8 March 1966 (age 59); Montreal, Quebec, Canada

Sport
- Sport: Ice hockey

Joe Foglietta (born 8 March 1966) is an Italian ice hockey player. He competed in the men's tournament at the 1992 Winter Olympics.
