= Radek Ťoupal =

- Born: 16 August 1966 (age 60) Písek, Czechoslovakia
- Height: 5 ft 11 in (180 cm)
- Weight: 194 lb (88 kg; 13 st 12 lb)
- Position: Centre
- Shot: Right
- Played for: Motor České Budějovice; HK Dukla Trenčín; HPK; Star Bulls Rosenheim; EC Kapfenberg
- National team: Czechoslovakia and Czech Republic
- NHL draft: 126th overall, 1987; Edmonton Oilers
- Playing career: 1982–2001

Olympic medal record

Men's Ice hockey
Bronze medal – third place	1992 Albertville	Ice hockey

Radek Ťoupal (born 16 August 1966) is a Czech former ice hockey player. His debut in Czechoslovak ice hockey league came in season 1982–83, playing for HC České Budějovice, when he was only 16. During an army duty spent two years playing for Slovak club HC Dukla Trenčín. He played on 1992 Bronze Medal winning Olympic ice hockey team for Czechoslovakia and also on Bronze Medal winning 1993 World Championships. Drafted 6th round draft choice of the Edmonton Oilers in 1987. Radek earned a university degree and is qualified to be a teacher. Ťoupal left professional ice hockey in 2001.

== Career statistics ==
=== Regular season and playoffs ===
			Regular season					Playoffs
Season	Team	League	GP	G	A	Pts	PIM	GP	G	A	Pts	PIM
1982–83	TJ Motor České Budějovice	TCH	3	1	0	1	0	—	—	—	—	—
1983–84	TJ Motor České Budějovice	TCH	6	0	2	2	0	—	—	—	—	—
1984–85	TJ Motor České Budějovice	TCH	40	8	10	18	16	—	—	—	—	—
1986–87	TJ Motor České Budějovice	TCH	35	16	14	30	20	—	—	—	—	—
1987–88	TJ Motor České Budějovice	TCH	31	16	17	33	—	—	—	—	—	—
1988–89	TJ Motor České Budějovice	TCH	44	29	29	58	10	—	—	—	—	—
1989–90	TJ Motor České Budějovice	TCH	47	23	27	50	—	—	—	—	—	—
1990–91	ASVŠ Dukla Trenčín	TCH	56	22	60	82	32	—	—	—	—	—
1991–92	HPK	Liiga	44	17	29	46	10	—	—	—	—	—
1992–93	HPK	Liiga	46	16	37	53	14	12	4	5	9	2
1993–94	HC České Budějovice	ELH	44	21	20	41	34	3	1	1	2	0
1994–95	Star Bulls Rosenheim	DEL	20	6	14	20	10	—	—	—	—	—
1994–95	HC České Budějovice	ELH	22	10	15	25	14	9	5	6	11	4
1995–96	HC České Budějovice	ELH	40	13	30	43	32	10	3	7	10	4
1996–97	HC České Budějovice	ELH	52	18	36	54	40	5	1	5	6	27
1997–98	HC České Budějovice	ELH	50	17	41	58	34	—	—	—	—	—
1998–99	HC České Budějovice	ELH	50	12	36	48	24	3	1	0	1	4
1999–2000	HC České Budějovice	ELH	48	10	21	31	16	3	0	1	1	0
2000–01	EC Kapfenberg	AUT	42	24	25	49	64	—	—	—	—	—
TCH totals			262	115	159	274	78	—	—	—	—	—
ELH totals			306	101	199	300	194	33	11	20	31	39

=== International ===
Year	Team	Event	GP	G	A	Pts	PIM
1984	Czechoslovakia	EJC	—	—	—	—	—
1986	Czechoslovakia	WJC	7	5	7	12	44
1991	Czechoslovakia	WC	10	1	1	2	0
1992	Czechoslovakia	OG	8	1	0	1	6
1993	Czech Republic	WC	8	2	5	7	4
1994	Czech Republic	OG	6	1	0	1	4
Senior totals			32	5	6	11	14
