= Todd Brost =

Canadian ice hockey player and coach

- Born: September 23, 1967 (age 59) Calgary, Alberta, Canada
- Height: 5 ft 8 in (173 cm)
- Weight: 179 lb (81 kg; 12 st 11 lb)
- Position: Centre
- Shot: Right
- Played for: Flint Generals; Salt Lake Golden Eagles; Huntington Blizzard
- National team: Canada
- Playing career: 1989–1995
Medal record
Men's Ice hockey
Silver medal – second place	1992 Albertville	Ice hockey

Todd Brost (born September 23, 1967) is a former Canadian ice hockey player and head coach.

As a player, he won a silver medal playing with Team Canada at the 1992 Winter Olympics.

Brost has been a head coach in the WPHL with the El Paso Buzzards (1996–2000), and in the UHL with the Elmira Jackals (2000–05). He won the WPHL's Coach of the Year award for the 1996–97 season.

== Awards and honours ==
Award	Year
All-CCHA Second Team	1988-89

== Career statistics ==
=== Regular season and playoffs ===
			Regular season					Playoffs
Season	Team	League	GP	G	A	Pts	PIM	GP	G	A	Pts	PIM
1983–84	Penticton Knights	BCHL	42	16	18	34	92	—	—	—	—	—
1985–86	University of Michigan	CCHA	38	9	26	35	30	—	—	—	—	—
1986–87	University of Michigan	CCHA	40	16	31	47	43	—	—	—	—	—
1987–88	University of Michigan	CCHA	36	18	23	41	27	—	—	—	—	—
1988–89	University of Michigan	CCHA	40	20	30	50	43	—	—	—	—	—
1988–89	Canada	Intl	5	0	3	3	0	—	—	—	—	—
1989–90	Canada	Intl	73	20	31	51	28	—	—	—	—	—
1990–91	Canada	Intl	56	12	21	33	40	—	—	—	—	—
1991–92	Canada	Intl	62	10	16	26	42	—	—	—	—	—
1991–92	EV Zug	NDA	—	—	—	—	—	1	0	0	0	2
1992–93	Salt Lake Golden Eagles	IHL	82	5	17	22	42	—	—	—	—	—
1993–94	Canada	Intl	50	4	20	24	22	—	—	—	—	—
1994–95	Huntington Blizzard	ECHL	68	14	26	40	108	4	1	3	4	2
Intl totals			246	46	91	137	132	—	—	—	—	—

=== International ===
Year	Team	Event	GP	G	A	Pts	PIM
1992	Canada	OG	8	0	4	4	4
