= Patrick Dunn (ice hockey) =

French ice hockey player

Personal information
- Nationality: French
- Born: 15 March 1963 (age 62) Trois-Rivières, Quebec, Canada

Sport
- Sport: Ice hockey

Patrick Dunn (born 15 March 1963) is a French ice hockey player. He competed in the men's tournament at the 1992 Winter Olympics.
