= Roger Nordström =

Swedish ice hockey player

- Born: 27 April 1966 (age 60) Malmö, Sweden
- Height: 5 ft 9 in (175 cm)
- Weight: 176 lb (80 kg; 12 st 8 lb)
- Position: Goaltender
- Caught: Left
- Elitserien DEL team: Malmö Redhawks; Krefeld Pinguine
- National team: Sweden
- Playing career: 1990–2003

Roger Ola Nordström (born 27 April 1966 in Malmö, Sweden) is a Swedish former ice hockey goaltender. Playing most seasons for Malmö Redhawks, he then played for German Krefeld Pinguine between 1998-2003.

During the 1992 Olympic tournament he was appointed for the Swedish national team.

== Trophies and awards ==
=== Club teams ===
- 1985: Promotion to Division 1 with Malmö IF
- 1990: Promotion to Elitserien with Malmö IF
- 1992: Swedish national champion with Malmö IF
- 1992: IIHF European Cup winner with Malmö IF
- 1994: Swedish national champion with Malmö IF
- 1994: Swedish All Star Team
- 2003: German national champion with Krefeld Pinguine

=== National teams ===
- 1994: World championship bronze medal in Italy with Sweden
- 1995: World championship silver medal in Sweden with Sweden
