= Andreas Beutler =

Swiss ice hockey player

- Born: January 26, 1963 (age 62)
- Height: 6 ft 3 in (191 cm)
- Weight: 205 lb (93 kg; 14 st 9 lb)
- Position: Defence
- Shot: Left
- Played for: SC Bern (NLA); EHC Basel NLB); SCL Tigers (NLB)
- National team: Switzerland
- Playing career: 1985–1998

Andreas Beutler (born January 26, 1963) is a retired professional ice hockey defender. He spent the majority of his career with SC Bern in the National League A and won three NLA championships with the team in 1989, 1991 and 1992. After retiring he became a coach and has coached several teams in the Swiss lower leagues.

== Achievements ==
- 1989 - NLA Champion with SC Bern
- 1991 - NLA Champion with SC Bern
- 1992 - NLA Champion with SC Bern

== International play ==
Andreas Beutler participated in the following tournaments for the Swiss national team:

- 1 A-World Championships: 1991
- 1 Olympic Games: 1992 in Albertville
