= Gil Montandon =

Swiss ice hockey player and analyst

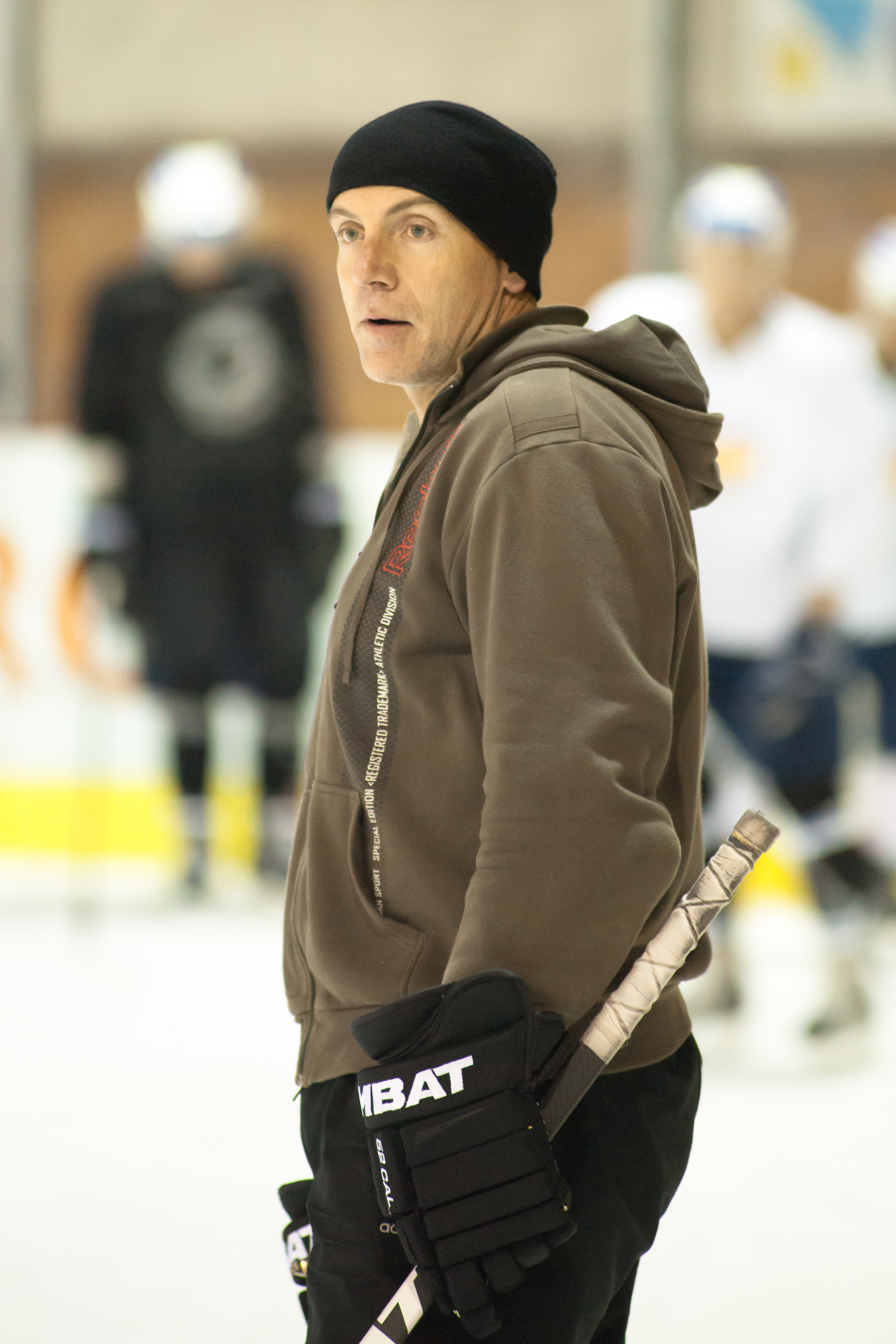
- Born: April 28, 1965 (age 60) Neuchâtel, SUI
- Height: 6 ft 1 in (185 cm)
- Weight: 199 lb (90 kg; 14 st 3 lb)
- Position: Centre
- Shot: Right
- Played for: SC Bern; HC Fribourg-Gottéron
- National team: Switzerland
- Playing career: 1984–2009

Gil Montandon (born April 28, 1965 in Neuchâtel, Switzerland) is a Swiss former professional ice hockey centre. He played in the National League (NL) for HC Fribourg-Gottéron and SC Bern.

Montandon used to work as a hockey analyst for the Francophone Swiss television station, RTS. He also briefly worked as a hockey expert for MySports, the official broadcaster of the Swiss National League. He was also a regular guest on hockey talk show, Les Puckalistes, on the Francophone Swiss television station, La Télé.

== Playing career ==
Montandon made his professional debut during the 1984-85 National League season, playing for HC Fribourg-Gottéron. He went on to play 5 seasons with the team before joining SC Bern in the summer of 1989. He played 11 seasons with Bern, winning 3 Swiss championships. In the summer of 2000, Montandon returned to his former team, HC Fribourg-Gottéron, to play 9 more seasons in the National League. He eventually retired from professional hockey at age 43. He played a total of 1,069 games in the National League, tallying 416 goals and 444 assists.

== Achievements ==
- 1991 - NL Champion with SC Bern
- 1992 - NL Champion with SC Bern
- 1997 - NL Champion with SC Bern

He is the first player to have played 1000 games in the Swiss National League.

== International play ==
Gil Montandon played a total of 156 games for the Swiss national team.

He participated in the following tournaments:

- 3 A-World Championships: 1991, 1992, 1993
- 3 B-World Championships: 1989, 1990, 1994
- 2 Olympic Games: 1988 in Calgary and 1992 in Albertville

== Coaching career ==
Prior to the 2011-12 MySports League season, Montandon was named head coach of HC Université Neuchâtel. He stayed at the helm of the team for 4 seasons before being named general manager of Swiss League (SL) team, EHC Visp at the beginning of the 2015/16 SL season. He was then named head coach of the team ad interim, before being replaced by Scott Beattie on December 28, 2015.

== Personal life ==
Montandon is the father of Arnaud and Maxime Montandon who both play for HC Sierre of the Swiss League (SL), as a center and a defenseman respectively.
