= Keith Fair =

Swiss ice hockey player

- Born: January 8, 1968 (age 57); Castlegar, British Columbia, Canada
- Height: 5 ft 11 in (180 cm)
- Weight: 187 lb (85 kg; 13 st 5 lb)
- Position: Left wing
- Shot: Left
- Played for: NLA; HC Ambrì-Piotta; HC Lugano; NLB; EHC Chur
- National team: Switzerland
- Playing career: 1986–2005

Keith Fair (born January 8, 1968) is a Canadian-born Swiss former professional ice hockey left winger.

Born in Castlegar, British Columbia, Fair played his entire professional career in Switzerland, playing in the National League A for HC Ambrì-Piotta and HC Lugano and in the National League B for EHC Chur.

Fair has participated as a member of the Swiss national team at the 1992 Winter Olympics and the 1992 IIHF World Championships.

== Career statistics ==
			Regular season					Playoffs
Season	Team	League	GP	G	A	Pts	PIM	GP	G	A	Pts	PIM
1984–85	Langley Eagles	BCJHL	46	8	21	29	58	—	—	—	—	—
1985–86	Langley Eagles	BCJHL	16	5	8	13	35	—	—	—	—	—
1985–86	Sidney Capitals	BCJHL	25	8	11	19	65	—	—	—	—	—
1986–87	HC Ambrì-Piotta	NLA	33	3	5	8	22	5	0	0	0	6
1987–88	HC Ambrì-Piotta	NLA	2	0	1	1	0	—	—	—	—	—
1987–88	Richmond Sockeyes	BCJHL	38	20	27	47	137	—	—	—	—	—
1988–89	HC Ambrì-Piotta	NLA	36	5	4	9	23	6	1	0	1	4
1989–90	HC Ambrì-Piotta	NLA	36	20	16	36	58	2	0	0	0	14
1990–91	HC Ambrì-Piotta	NLA	33	6	10	16	56	5	3	1	4	6
1991–92	HC Ambrì-Piotta	NLA	36	18	19	37	34	10	7	3	10	14
1992–93	HC Ambrì-Piotta	NLA	28	8	15	23	42	9	3	0	3	20
1993–94	HC Ambrì-Piotta	NLA	36	8	18	26	26	5	2	0	2	6
1994–95	HC Ambrì-Piotta	NLA	36	10	18	28	34	3	1	1	2	6
1995–96	HC Lugano	NLA	36	10	28	38	30	4	1	2	3	2
1996–97	HC Lugano	NLA	46	10	12	22	79	8	1	1	2	4
1997–98	HC Lugano	NLA	40	5	8	13	30	7	2	1	3	6
1998–99	HC Lugano	NLA	45	5	14	19	20	16	1	2	3	12
1999–00	HC Lugano	NLA	45	9	12	21	28	14	3	4	7	0
2000–01	HC Lugano	NLA	44	5	14	19	38	18	0	1	1	14
2001–02	HC Lugano	NLA	17	2	7	9	22	13	1	1	2	6
2002–03	HC Lugano	NLA	40	1	11	12	28	16	1	3	4	10
2003–04	HC Lugano	NLA	43	3	2	5	32	16	1	2	3	6
2004–05	HC Lugano	NLA	33	1	3	4	26	5	0	0	0	6
2004–05	EHC Chur	NLB	1	0	0	0	0	—	—	—	—	—
NLA totals			664	129	217	346	628	162	28	22	50	142
