= Santino Pellegrino =

Italian ice hockey player

Personal information
- Nationality: Italian
- Born: 9 February 1965 (age 60); Montreal, Quebec, Canada

Sport
- Sport: Ice hockey

Santino Pellegrino (born 9 February 1965) is an Italian ice hockey player. He competed in the men's tournament at the 1992 Winter Olympics.
