= Patrik Erickson =

Swedish ice hockey player

- Born: March 13, 1969 (age 57) Sweden
- Height: 1.75 m (5 ft 9 in)
- Weight: 80 kg (176 lb; 12 st 8 lb)
- Position: Centre
- Shot: Right
- Played for: Brynäs IF; AIK; Djurgårdens IF
- National team: Sweden
- NHL draft: 37th overall, 1987; Winnipeg Jets
- Playing career: 1986–2000

Patrik Dag Erickson (born March 13, 1969) is a Swedish former ice hockey player. He was selected by the Winnipeg Jets in the 2nd round (37th overall) of the 1987 NHL entry draft.

Erickson played with Team Sweden at the 1992 Winter Olympics.

== Career statistics ==
=== Regular season and playoffs ===
			Regular season					Playoffs
Season	Team	League	GP	G	A	Pts	PIM	GP	G	A	Pts	PIM
1985–86	Brynäs IF	SWE U20
1986–87	Brynäs IF	SEL	25	10	5	15	8	—	—	—	—	—
1987–88	Brynäs IF	SEL	35	14	9	23	6	—	—	—	—	—
1988–89	Brynäs IF	SEL	33	6	10	16	14	5	1	2	3	4
1989–90	Brynäs IF	SEL	40	14	17	31	18	5	3	2	5	4
1990–91	Brynäs IF	SEL	33	9	14	23	36	2	1	1	2	4
1991–92	AIK	SEL	37	7	19	26	34	3	1	0	1	0
1992–93	AIK	SEL	22	7	7	14	14	—	—	—	—	—
1992–93	AIK	Allsv	16	4	9	13	6	—	—	—	—	—
1993–94	Djurgårdens IF	SEL	29	2	6	8	8	6	1	2	3	0
1994–95	Djurgårdens IF	SEL	40	10	14	24	18	3	0	1	1	8
1995–96	Djurgårdens IF	SEL	39	14	15	29	10	4	1	1	2	0
1996–97	Djurgårdens IF	SEL	50	18	19	37	26	4	2	0	2	4
1997–98	Djurgårdens IF	SEL	46	14	11	25	37	14	5	1	6	6
1998–99	Djurgårdens IF	SEL	48	8	11	19	18	4	1	0	1	6
1999–00	Hammarby IF	Allsv	34	11	31	42	20	2	0	1	1	0
SEL totals			477	133	157	290	247	50	16	10	26	36

=== International ===
Year	Team	Event	GP	G	A	Pts	PIM
1987	Sweden	EJC	7	5	4	9	6
1988	Sweden	WJC	7	3	2	5	8
1989	Sweden	WJC	7	4	6	10	6
1990	Sweden	WC	9	3	0	3	2
1991	Sweden	WC	9	0	1	1	4
1992	Sweden	OG	8	2	2	4	2
Junior totals			21	12	12	24	20
Senior totals			26	5	3	8	8
