= Oldřich Svoboda =

Czechoslovak ice hockey player

Olympic medal record

Men's Ice hockey
Bronze medal – third place	1992 Albertville	Ice hockey

Oldřich Svoboda (born 28 January 1967 in Hradec Králové) played goalie on the 1992 Bronze medal winning Olympic ice hockey team for Czechoslovakia.
