= Alleghe Hockey =

- City: Alleghe, Italy
- League: Italian Hockey League
- Founded: 1933; 93 years ago
- Home arena: Palaghiaccio Alvise De Toni
- Colours: Red and white
- Head coach: Alessandro Fontana
- Website: www.alleghehockey.com

Alleghe Hockey is a professional ice hockey team in Alleghe, Italy. The team plays in the country's second-tier Italian Hockey League and plays at Stadio Alvise De Toni in Alleghe.

The team was the surprise winner of the 1992-93 Alpenliga.

Current coach of the Vegas Golden Knights NHL team Bruce Cassidy was an important player for Alleghe Hockey, also a member of the roster in the 1992-93 Alpenliga win.

They were also formerly coached by former NHL player Steve McKenna.

== Notable players ==
- Rick Morocco
- Bruce Cassidy
- Mario Chitaroni
- David Delfino
- Constant Priondolo
- Nikolai Zherdev
- Steve McKenna

== Women's teams ==
Alleghe Hockey women's team won the Italian Hockey League Women league in season 2018-2019.
