= Jari Lindroos =

Finnish ice hockey player

Jari Juhani Lindroos (born 31 January 1961 in Pieksämäki, Finland) is a Finnish former professional ice hockey player who played in the SM-liiga. He played for JYP, Jokerit and Kärpät and competed with the Finland national ice hockey team at the 1992 Winter Olympics. He was inducted into the Finnish Hockey Hall of Fame in 2005.

== Career statistics ==
=== Regular season and playoffs ===
			Regular season					Playoffs
Season	Team	League	GP	G	A	Pts	PIM	GP	G	A	Pts	PIM
1981–82	Jokerit	SM-l	34	4	2	6	14	—	—	—	—	—
1982–83	Jokerit	SM-l	34	13	13	26	8	8	2	2	4	8
1983–84	Jokerit	SM-l	35	20	25	45	30	—	—	—	—	—
1984–85	Jokerit	SM-l	36	14	36	50	36	—	—	—	—	—
1985–86	Jokerit	SM-l	36	18	30	48	30	—	—	—	—	—
1986–87	Jokerit	SM-l	40	9	27	36	30	—	—	—	—	—
1987–88	Kärpät	SM-l	44	18	35	53	48	—	—	—	—	—
1988–89	Kärpät	SM-l	28	8	14	22	14	—	—	—	—	—
1989–90	JYP	SM-l	44	18	41	59	38	3	1	0	1	0
1990–91	JYP	SM-l	44	26	36	62	30	7	4	6	10	6
1991–92	JYP	SM-l	44	18	49	67	32	10	5	5	10	2
1992–93	JYP	SM-l	48	20	34	54	22	10	2	5	7	8
1993–94	JYP	SM-l	48	13	30	43	54	4	1	1	2	2
1994–95	JYP	SM-l	49	15	24	39	85	4	2	0	2	8
1995–96	Jokerit	SM-l	37	11	19	30	16	11	4	5	9	8
1996–97	Jokerit	SM-l	46	5	17	22	24	9	2	2	4	2
SM-l totals			647	230	432	662	511	66	23	26	49	48

=== International ===
Year	Team	Event	GP	G	A	Pts	PIM
1992	Finland	OG	8	0	4	4	6
Senior totals			8	0	4	4	6
