= Peter Ottosson =

Swedish ice hockey player

Personal information
- Nationality: Swedish
- Born: 4 September 1965 (age 60) Mariestad, Sweden

Sport
- Sport: Ice hockey

Peter Ottosson (born 4 September 1965) is a Swedish ice hockey player. He competed in the men's tournament at the 1992 Winter Olympics.

== Career statistics ==
=== Regular season and playoffs ===
			Regular season					Playoffs
Season	Team	League	GP	G	A	Pts	PIM	GP	G	A	Pts	PIM
1981–82	Mariestad BoIS	SWE.3	3	1	1	2
1982–83	Mariestad BoIS	SWE.2	27	12	4	16	8	—	—	—	—	—
1983–84	Mariestad BoIS	SWE.2	29	16	14	30	6	—	—	—	—	—
1984–85	Mariestad BoIS	SWE.2	30	14	18	32	16	—	—	—	—	—
1985–86	Mariestad BoIS	SWE.2	31	24	25	49	10	—	—	—	—	—
1986–87	IF Troja/Ljungby	SWE.2	32	25	20	45	14	—	—	—	—	—
1987–88	IF Troja/Ljungby	SWE.2	32	24	21	45	12	—	—	—	—	—
1988–89	Färjestad BK	SEL	39	6	21	27	20	2	0	0	0	0
1989–90	Färjestad BK	SEL	38	10	13	23	10	9	0	0	0	0
1990–91	Färjestad BK	SEL	37	14	10	24	14	8	5	0	5	2
1991–92	Färjestad BK	SEL	40	18	25	43	16	—	—	—	—	—
1992–93	Färjestad BK	SEL	37	16	20	36	12	3	0	0	0	2
1993–94	Färjestad BK	SEL	22	4	8	12	10	—	—	—	—	—
1993–94	Färjestad BK	Allsv	18	7	7	14	14	3	1	1	1	2
1994–95	Färjestad BK	SEL	35	7	4	11	12	3	0	1	1	2
1995–96	Färjestad BK	SEL	31	11	9	20	14	8	1	1	2	4
1996–97	Färjestad BK	SEL	50	19	20	39	20	14	5	6	11	14
1997–98	EHC Kloten	NDA	40	19	15	34	45	7	2	2	4	4
1998–99	Star Bulls Rosenheim GmbH	DEL	48	6	17	23	22	—	—	—	—	—
1999–2000	Star Bulls Rosenheim GmbH	DEL	55	5	18	23	8	—	—	—	—	—
2000–01	HV71	SEL	45	16	11	27	20	—	—	—	—	—
2001–02	HV71	SEL	37	5	8	13	20	8	2	3	5	2
2002–03	Forshaga IF	SWE.4	25	33	39	72	24	—	—	—	—	—
2005–06	Forshaga IF	SWE.4		0	4	4	0	—	—	—	—	—
SWE.2 totals			181	115	102	217	66	—	—	—	—	—
SEL totals			411	126	149	275	168	55	13	11	24	16

=== International ===
Year	Team	Event	GP	G	A	Pts	PIM
1992	Sweden	OG	6	0	2	2	2
1992	Sweden	WC	8	0	2	2	2
Senior totals			14	0	4	4	4

"Peter Ottosson". Elite Prospects.
