= Fabian Joseph =

Canadian ice hockey player

- Born: December 5, 1965 (age 60) Sydney, Nova Scotia, Canada
- Height: 5 ft 9 in (175 cm)
- Weight: 165 lb (75 kg; 11 st 11 lb)
- Position: Centre
- Shot: Left
- Played for: AHL; Nova Scotia Oilers; Cape Breton Oilers; ITA; Bruneck-Brunico; NLA; EHC Chur; IHL; Milwaukee Admirals
- National team: Canada
- NHL draft: 109th overall, 1984; Toronto Maple Leafs
- Playing career: 1985–1996

Olympic medal record

Men's Ice hockey
Silver medal – second place	1992 Albertville	Team
Silver medal – second place	1994 Lillehammer	Team

Fabian Gerard Joseph (born December 5, 1965) is a Canadian former professional ice hockey centre. He is most prominent for his role with the Canadian national ice hockey team in the late 1980s and early 1990s. He is a winner of two Winter Olympic silver medals. He was Captain of Team Canada at the Lillehammer Olympic games in 1994. After playing hockey, Joseph continued his career, notably coaching the men's ice hockey team at Dalhousie University.

== Ice hockey career ==
Joseph had moderate success in the amateur leagues by scoring 127 points for the Victoria Cougars of the WHL in 1984. Subsequently, Joseph was selected by the Toronto Maple Leafs 109th overall in the 1984 NHL entry draft. In 1985, he joined the Canadian national team. Joseph never actually played in the NHL. After his time on the national team, Joseph joined the Nova Scotia/Cape Breton Oilers (an affiliate with the Edmonton Oilers) in 1988. Joseph was captain of the team for the 1989 and 1990 AHL seasons. He also scored 30 goals or more in each of his three seasons with the team (31 in 1988, 32 in 1989 and 33 in 1990). Subsequently, in 1991–92, he returned to the Canadian National Team and won two Winter Olympic Silver medals (1992 and 1994) as well as being team captain. In all, Joseph had 163 points in 282 games while playing with the Canadian National team. Joseph also spent time playing in the Swiss and Italian Hockey leagues before ending his playing career with the Milwaukee Admirals of the International Hockey League in 1996.

== Post-playing career and coaching ==
Joseph's coaching career began with the Milwaukee Admirals of the IHL (Now part of the AHL) between 1996 and 1998. He then worked as an assistant coach for the Halifax Mooseheads (2000 Memorial Cup participants) and was head coach and director of hockey operations for the Dalhousie Tigers, a Canadian university Men's Hockey team for 7 seasons. He became assistant coach of the Moncton Wildcats in the Quebec Major Junior Hockey League in the 2008–2009 season until 2011–12. He became head coach in the 2012–2013 season until 2014–2015. He then became the head coach of the Woodstock Slammers of the MJAHL in the 2015–2016 season

In 2002, Joseph was inducted into the Nova Scotia Sport Hall of Fame. He is also a member of the Cape Breton Sport Hall of Fame.

== Career statistics ==
=== Regular season and playoffs ===
			Regular season					Playoffs
Season	Team	League	GP	G	A	Pts	PIM	GP	G	A	Pts	PIM
1982–83	Victoria Cougars	WHL	69	42	48	90	50	12	4	7	11	9
1983–84	Victoria Cougars	WHL	72	52	75	127	27	—	—	—	—	—
1984–85	Toronto Marlboros	OHL	60	32	43	75	16	5	2	4	6	14
1985–86	Canada	Intl	71	26	18	44	51	—	—	—	—	—
1986–87	Canada	Intl	74	15	30	45	26	—	—	—	—	—
1987–88	Nova Scotia Oilers	AHL	77	31	39	70	20	5	0	3	3	8
1988–89	Cape Breton Oilers	AHL	70	32	34	66	30	—	—	—	—	—
1989–90	Cape Breton Oilers	AHL	77	33	53	86	46	6	0	3	3	4
1990–91	EV MAK Bruneck	ITA	36	30	54	84	10	—	—	—	—	—
1991–92	EHC Chur	NDA	3	4	1	5	4	—	—	—	—	—
1991–92	Canada	Intl	62	17	25	42	25	—	—	—	—	—
1992–93	EHC Chur	NDA	20	10	13	23	10	—	—	—	—	—
1992–93	Canada	Intl	12	4	6	10	4	—	—	—	—	—
1993–94	Canada	Intl	63	5	17	22	33	—	—	—	—	—
1993–94	Milwaukee Admirals	IHL	18	3	6	9	4	4	0	0	0	0
1994–95	Milwaukee Admirals	IHL	78	7	27	34	32	14	3	4	7	6
1995–96	Milwaukee Admirals	IHL	65	10	10	20	36	5	0	1	1	0
AHL totals			224	96	126	222	96	11	0	6	6	12
Intl totals			282	67	96	163	139	—	—	—	—	—
IHL totals			161	20	43	63	72	23	3	5	8	6

=== International ===
Year	Team	Event	GP	G	A	Pts	PIM
1992	Canada	OG	8	2	1	3	2
1994	Canada	OG	8	0	2	2	2
Senior totals			16	2	3	5	4
