= Ivano Zanatta =

Italian ice hockey player

Personal information
- Nationality: Italian
- Born: 3 August 1960 (age 64); Toronto, Ontario, Canada

Sport
- Sport: Ice hockey

Ivano Zanatta (born 3 August 1960) is an Italian ice hockey coach and former player. He competed in the men's tournament at the 1992 Winter Olympics. He currently serves as the head coach to HC Kunlun Red Star of the Kontinental Hockey League (KHL) and also the Chinese national team.
