= Patrik Augusta =

Czechoslovak ice hockey player

- Born: November 13, 1969 (age 56) Jihlava, Czechoslovakia
- Height: 5 ft 9 in (175 cm)
- Weight: 169 lb (77 kg; 12 st 1 lb)
- Position: Left wing
- Shot: Left
- Played for: HC Dukla Jihlava; St. John's Maple Leafs; Toronto Maple Leafs; Washington Capitals; Long Beach Ice Dogs; SERC Wild Wings; Krefeld Pinguine; Hannover Scorpions
- National team: Czechoslovakia
- NHL draft: 149th overall, 1992; Toronto Maple Leafs
- Playing career: 1988–2006

Medal record

Representing Czechoslovakia

Men's ice hockey

World Championships
Bronze medal – third place	1992 Czechoslovakia	

Olympic Games
Bronze medal – third place	1992 Albertville	

Patrik Augusta (born November 13, 1969) is a Czech former professional ice hockey winger. He played 4 games in the National Hockey League with the Toronto Maple Leafs and Washington Capitals between 1994 and 1998. The rest of his career, which lasted from 1988 to 2006, was primarily spent in the minor leagues and later in the German Deutsche Eishockey Liga. Internationally Augusta played for the Czechoslovak national team at the 1992 Winter Olympics and 1992 World Championship, winning a bronze medal in each tournament. After retiring from play Augusta turned to coaching, working for teams in the Czech Republic.

== Playing career ==
Augusta was drafted 149th overall by the Toronto Maple Leafs in the 1992 NHL entry draft and played two games for the Leafs and two games for the Washington Capitals. He played in the IHL with the Long Beach Ice Dogs and then the Deutsche Eishockey Liga in which he played for the Schwenningen Wild Wings, Krefeld Penguins, and the Hannover Scorpions. After the 2005–06 season, he announced his retirement. After working for 2 years as a European scout for the Phoenix Coyotes, he worked as a sporting manager for team Dukla Jihlava. In 2009 he started his coaching career as an assistant coach for Dukla Jihlava.

Augusta played on the bronze medal winning ice hockey team for Czechoslovakia at the 1992 Winter Olympics. He also played on the bronze medal team at the 1992 World Championships in Prague. He was on the 1991 Czechoslovakia Elite League-winning team Dukla Jihlava, and the 2003 Deutsche Eishockey Liga-winning team Krefeld Pinguine.

== Post-playing career ==
In 2012, August became a head coach at the Dukla Jihlava Ice Hockey Academy, coaching the U16, U18 and U20 teams. He also worked as assistant coach with the U16, U17, and U18 Czech National Team at the U18 World Championship in Grand Forks, North Dakota.

His father Josef Augusta, who won a silver medal for Czechoslovakia at the 1976 Winter Olympics and was a three-time gold medal winner as a Coach for the Czech Republic at the World Championships in 1999, 2000, and 2001, died on February 16, 2017.

== Career statistics ==
=== Regular season and playoffs ===
			Regular season					Playoffs
Season	Team	League	GP	G	A	Pts	PIM	GP	G	A	Pts	PIM
1988–89	ASD Dukla Jihlava	CSSR	15	3	1	4	4	—	—	—	—	—
1989–90	ASD Dukla Jihlava	CSSR	53	15	13	28	—	—	—	—	—	—
1990–91	ASD Dukla Jihlava	CSSR	51	20	23	43	18	—	—	—	—	—
1991–92	ASD Dukla Jihlava	CSSR	42	16	15	31	—	—	—	—	—	—
1992–93	St. John's Maple Leafs	AHL	75	32	45	77	74	8	3	3	6	23
1993–94	Toronto Maple Leafs	NHL	2	0	0	0	0	—	—	—	—	—
1993–94	St. John's Maple Leafs	AHL	77	53	43	96	105	11	4	8	12	4
1994–95	St. John's Maple Leafs	AHL	71	37	32	69	98	4	2	0	2	7
1995–96	Los Angeles Ice Dogs	IHL	79	34	51	85	83	—	—	—	—	—
1996–97	Long Beach Ice Dogs	IHL	82	45	42	87	96	18	4	4	8	33
1997–98	Long Beach Ice Dogs	IHL	82	41	40	81	84	17	11	7	18	20
1998–99	Washington Capitals	NHL	2	0	0	0	0	—	—	—	—	—
1998–99	Long Beach Ice Dogs	IHL	68	24	35	59	125	8	4	6	10	4
1999–00	SERC Wild Wings	DEL	34	14	15	29	52	—	—	—	—	—
2000–01	SERC Wild Wings	DEL	56	25	25	50	44	—	—	—	—	—
2001–02	Krefeld Pinguine	DEL	60	15	40	55	54	3	0	0	0	2
2002–03	Krefeld Pinguine	DEL	51	15	19	34	48	14	5	13	18	18
2003–04	Hannover Scorpions	DEL	51	20	18	38	66	—	—	—	—	—
2004–05	Hannover Scorpions	DEL	51	17	29	46	67	—	—	—	—	—
2005–06	Hannover Scorpions	DEL	22	8	7	15	18	10	1	2	3	10
CSSR totals			161	54	52	106	—	—	—	—	—	—
DEL totals			325	114	153	267	349	27	6	15	21	30
NHL totals			4	0	0	0	0	—	—	—	—	—

=== International ===
Year	Team	Event	GP	G	A	Pts	PIM
1992	Czechoslovakia	OLY	8	3	2	5	0
1992	Czechoslovakia	WC	5	2	2	4	4
Senior totals			13	5	4	9	4
