= Rick Morocco =

Canadian-Italian ice hockey executive and player

- Born: February 14, 1963 (age 62); Niagara Falls, Ontario, Canada
- Height: 5 ft 10 in (178 cm)
- Weight: 185 lb (84 kg; 13 st 3 lb)
- Position: Left wing
- Shot: Left
- Played for: Alleghe Hockey; HC Merano; HC Devils Milano
- National team: Italy
- Playing career: 1987–1993

Rick Morocco (born February 14, 1963) is a Canadian-Italian ice hockey executive, and former professional player. A native of Niagara Falls, Ontario, he played junior ice hockey in Ontario, before winning a national university championship with the York Lions. During six seasons of professional hockey in Italy, he also played for the Italy men's national team at the World Championships and Winter Olympics. After his playing career, he served as an executive for Ontario University Athletics, the Professional Hockey Players' Association, the Canadian Junior Hockey League, and the Ontario Junior Hockey League. He was inducted into the Niagara Falls Sports Wall of Fame in 2005.

== Early life ==
Rick Morocco was born on February 14, 1963, in Niagara Falls, Ontario. He played ice hockey as a youth, and won an Ontario Minor Hockey Association championship in 1973.

== Playing career ==
Morocco played hockey as a left winger, and was a left-handed shooter. He was listed as 5 feet 10 inches (1.78 m) and 185 pounds (84 kg). He began playing junior ice hockey in the 1978–79 season with the Fort Erie Meteors at age 15. His team won the Niagara District Junior B Hockey League championship, and he won the league's rookie of the year award.

During the 1979–80 season, Morocco played for the Aurora Tigers in the Ontario Provincial Junior A Hockey League, and scored 24 goals and 26 assists in 38 games. After the season, he was offered a hockey scholarship to Boston University, and was selected fourteenth overall in the Ontario Hockey League (OHL) draft. During three seasons in the OHL, he played for the Kitchener Rangers, Sault Ste. Marie Greyhounds, Niagara Falls Flyers, and North Bay Centennials.

Attending York University, Morocco played three hockey seasons for the York Lions from 1984 to 1987. With the Lions, he won three Ontario University Athletics titles, and the CIAU University Cup as national champion in 1985.

Morocco played six seasons of professional hockey in the Italian Hockey League first division from 1987 to 1993, which included tenures with Alleghe Hockey, HC Merano, and HC Devils Milano. He also played for the Italy men's national team at the Ice Hockey World Championships and the 1992 Winter Olympics.

Morocco was inducted into the Niagara Falls Sports Wall of Fame in 2005.

== Executive career ==
After his playing career, Morocco served as executive director of the Ontario University Athletics, director of player relations of the Professional Hockey Players' Association, and managing director of the Niagara Falls International Marathon. He was named the first executive director of the Canadian Junior Hockey League in February 2014. He served in the role until September 2016, when succeeded by Brent Ladds. Morocco later served as the director of business development and events for the Ontario Junior Hockey League as of 2020.
