= Janusz Hajnos =

Polish ice hockey player (1968–2019)

- Born: August 27, 1968; Nowy Targ, Poland
- Died: August 29, 2019 (aged 51); Nowy Targ, Poland
- Height: 5 ft 10 in (178 cm)
- Weight: 207 lb (94 kg; 14 st 11 lb)
- Position: Right wing
- Shot: Left
- Played for: Podhale Nowy Targ; GKS Katowice; KTH Krynica
- National team: Poland
- Playing career: 1987–2007

Janusz Mariusz Hajnos (27 August 1968 – 29 August 2019) was a Polish ice hockey player. He played for Podhale Nowy Targ, GKS Katowice, and KTH Krynica during his career. He also played for the Polish national team at the 1992 Winter Olympics. He led the Polish Ekstraklasa in goal scoring during the 1991–92 season.

Hajnos died on 29 August 2019 in Nowy Targ, two days after his 51st birthday.
