= Ron Fischer =

Canadian-born German ice hockey player

- Born: April 12, 1959 (age 65); Merritt, British Columbia, Canada
- Height: 6 ft 2 in (188 cm)
- Weight: 195 lb (88 kg; 13 st 13 lb)
- Position: Defence
- Shot: Right
- Played for: Buffalo Sabres; SC Riessersee; SB Rosenheim/Starbulls Rosenheim
- National team: West Germany and Germany
- NHL draft: Undrafted
- Playing career: 1980–1996

Ronald Alexander Fischer (born April 12, 1959) is a Canadian-born German former professional ice hockey defenceman. He played eighteen games in the National Hockey League with the Buffalo Sabres between the 1981–82 and 1982–83 seasons, recording seven assists. The rest of his career, which lasted from 1981 to 1996, was mainly spent playing in Germany for Star Bulls Rosenheim. Internationally Fischer played for both the West German and German national teams at multiple tournaments, including the 1988 and 1992 Winter Olympics.

Fischer was born in Merritt, British Columbia.

== Career statistics ==
=== Regular season and playoffs ===
			Regular season					Playoffs
Season	Team	League	GP	G	A	Pts	PIM	GP	G	A	Pts	PIM
1978–79	Sherwood Park Crusaders	AJHL	—	—	—	—	—	—	—	—	—	—
1978–79	Edmonton Oil Kings	WHL	1	0	0	0	0	8	1	2	3	6
1979–80	University of Calgary	CIAU	33	4	12	16	54	—	—	—	—	—
1980–81	University of Calgary	CIAU	29	7	24	31	63	—	—	—	—	—
1980–81	Rochester Americans	AHL	4	0	0	0	0	—	—	—	—	—
1981–82	Buffalo Sabres	NHL	15	0	7	7	6	—	—	—	—	—
1981–82	Rochester Americans	AHL	61	6	20	26	122	9	1	2	3	22
1982–83	Buffalo Sabres	NHL	3	0	0	0	0	—	—	—	—	—
1982–83	Rochester Americans	AHL	40	2	19	21	56	—	—	—	—	—
1983–84	Rochester Americans	AHL	80	10	32	42	94	15	4	3	7	19
1984–85	SC Riessersee	GER	34	9	15	24	50	—	—	—	—	—
1985–86	SC Riessersee	GER	54	40	52	92	72	—	—	—	—	—
1986–87	SB Rosenheim	GER	41	5	45	50	56	—	—	—	—	—
1987–88	SB Rosenheim	GER	33	12	16	28	72	14	7	9	16	17
1988–89	SB Rosenheim	GER	33	11	32	43	28	11	5	12	17	13
1989–90	SB Rosenheim	GER	36	16	20	36	20	11	3	4	7	14
1990–91	SB Rosenheim	GER	31	5	16	21	31	11	1	8	9	8
1991–92	SB Rosenheim	GER	41	4	30	34	52	10	2	7	9	10
1992–93	SB Rosenheim	GER-2	50	9	51	60	53	—	—	—	—	—
1993–94	SB Rosenheim	GER	43	10	25	35	25	—	—	—	—	—
1994–95	Starbulls Rosenheim	DEL	29	1	13	14	20	7	3	5	8	20
1995–96	Starbulls Rosenheim	DEL	50	4	38	42	46	4	0	1	1	4
GER/DEL totals			425	117	302	419	472	92	32	78	110	124
NHL totals			18	0	7	7	6	—	—	—	—	—

=== International ===
Year	Team	Event	GP	G	A	Pts	PIM
1988	West Germany	OLY	8	1	1	2	6
1989	West Germany	WC	10	2	1	3	6
1992	Germany	OLY	8	1	3	4	4
1992	Germany	WC	6	1	2	3	4
Senior totals			34	5	7	12	20
