= Manuele Celio =

Swiss ice hockey player and coach

- Born: June 9, 1966 (age 58); Faido, Switzerland
- Height: 5 ft 10 in (178 cm)
- Weight: 181 lb (82 kg; 12 st 13 lb)
- Position: Left wing
- Shot: Left
- Played for: NLA; HC Ambri-Piotta; Kloten Flyers
- National team: Switzerland
- NHL draft: Undrafted
- Playing career: 1982–2003

Manuele Celio (born June 9, 1966) is a Swiss former professional ice hockey player. He is currently the head coach of the Switzerland men's national junior ice hockey team at the 2012 World Junior Ice Hockey Championships.

Celio competed with the Switzerland men's national ice hockey team at both the 1988 and 1992 Winter Olympic Games, and also at the 1987, 1991, 1992, and 1993 Men's World Ice Hockey Championships.
