= Samuel Balmer =

Swiss ice hockey player

- Born: May 1, 1968 (age 56); Unterseen, SUI
- Height: 5 ft 9 in (175 cm)
- Weight: 179 lb (81 kg; 12 st 11 lb)
- Position: Defence
- Shot: Left
- Played for: SCL Tigers; HC Fribourg-Gottéron; HC Lugano; HC Davos; Kloten Flyers; EHC Basel
- National team: Switzerland
- Playing career: 1986–2005

Samuel Balmer (born May 1, 1968) is a former Swiss professional ice hockey defenceman who last played for EHC Basel in Switzerland's National League A.

Balmer has participated as a member of the Swiss national team in numerous international tournaments, including the 1992 Winter Olympics.
