= Benoit Laporte =

Canadian-French ice hockey player and coach

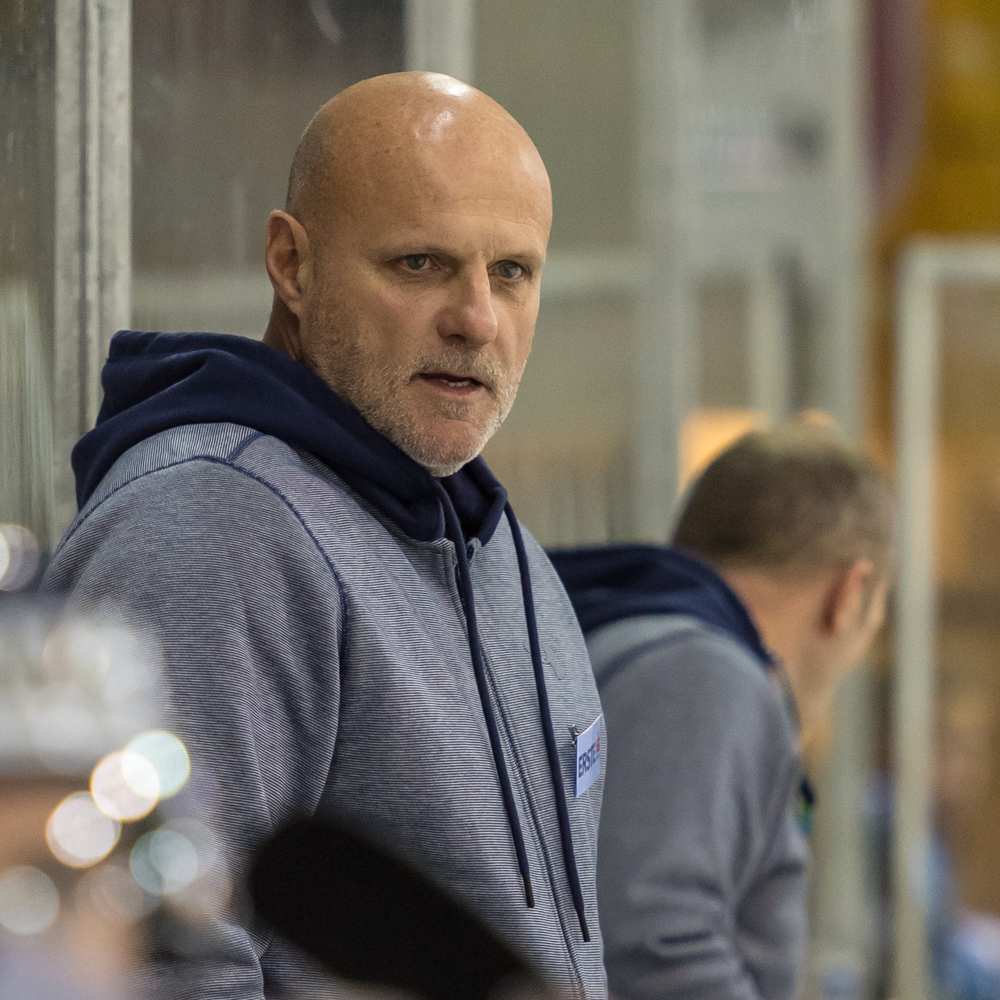
Benoit Laporte 2016

Benoit Laporte (born June 14, 1960) is a Canadian-French professional ice hockey coach and a former professional ice hockey player. He last served as head coach of the 3L de Rivière-du-Loup.

== Playing career ==
Born in Montreal, Quebec, Laporte played junior in the Quebec Major Junior Hockey League. Laporte played professionally in the AHL, EHL, CHL, UHL and ACHL in the early and mid 1980s. In 1987, he signed with the Diables Rouges de Briançon in France. He left the club after two years, but stayed in the country, joining the Dragons de Rouen, where he would spend the remainder of his playing career. He left Rouen as the club's all-time leader in points. Laporte announced his retirement in 1997.

== National team ==
After receiving a French passport, Laporte represented the French national team internationally. He played in the 1992 and 1994 Olympic Games and in five World Championships. He won a total of 138 caps for the French national team during his career.

== Coaching career ==
In his last season with the Dragons de Rouen (1996–97), Laporte served as a player-coach. After he put an end to his playing career in 1997, he took over Lausanne HC, a member of the Swiss second-tier NLB, as head coach and spent three years at the helm.

In 2000, he embarked on a three-year stint with Hockey Club Asiago of the Italian elite league Serie A, guiding the team to the Italian championship his first year, to the playoff semifinals his second and a runner-up finish his third year. He left Asiago in 2003 to sign with the Augsburger Panther of the German top-flight Deutsche Eishockey Liga (DEL). He remained in that position until the end of the 2004-05 campaign, in which he had guided the team to a DEL playoff appearance.

Laporte was named head coach at fellow DEL side Nürnberg Ice Tigers for the 2006-07 season. In his first season behind the Nürnberg bench, Laporte led the team to a third-place finish in the DEL regular season and to the playoff finals where the Ice Tigers were swept (0-3) by Adler Mannheim. In 2007-08, the Ice Tigers won the DEL regular season championship, Laporte was named DEL Coach of the Year. The Ice Tigers fell short in the playoff quarterfinals against Düsseldorfer EG that year.

In April 2008, Laporte was hired as head coach by Swiss NLA side EHC Basel to guide the team through the play-out round, but did not manage to save the team from relegation to the NLB.

He signed with another German first-division team, ERC Ingolstadt, for the 2008-09 season, but was released in late November 2008 after a 1-5 loss to Köln. In 2009, Laporte put pen to paper on a two-year deal with HC Ambrì-Piotta of the Swiss NLA. He was sacked in October 2010. Two months later, Laporte assumed head-coaching duties with the Hamburg Freezers of the German top-flight Deutsche Eishockey Liga (DEL). Under Laporte's guidance, the Freezers qualified for the DEL playoffs three straight seasons. In 2013-14, he coached the Hamburg team to winning the DEL regular season championship and guided the Freezers to the playoff semifinals. He was released in September 2014 after the Freezers had lost the opening four games of the 2014-15 DEL season and also remained winless in five straight games of the Champions Hockey League.

Laporte signed with the Schlittschuh Club Langnau Tigers of the Swiss elite league NLA for the 2015-16 season. After a run of three straight losses and only one win out of the last seven games, Laporte was sacked on March 14, 2016. In August 2016, Laporte was named head coach of Alba Volán Székesfehérvár. The Hungarian side is a member of the Austrian Hockey League. He was relieved of his duties in November 2017 due to a series of bad results.

Starting in October 2019, Laporte served as head coach of the 3L de Rivière-du-Loup in the Ligue Nord-Américaine de Hockey and stayed on the job until the end of the 2019-20 campaign.
