= Andrzej Świstak =

Polish ice hockey player and coach

- Born: June 2, 1963 (age 62) Nowy Targ, Poland
- Height: 5 ft 8 in (173 cm)
- Weight: 165 lb (75 kg; 11 st 11 lb)
- Position: Forward
- Played for: Podhale Nowy Targ; Les Orques d'Anglet; Rapaces de Gap; Girondins de Bordeaux; Flammes Bleues de Reims; Aquitains de Bordeaux; Dogues de Bordeaux; Bélougas de Toulouse; Lions de Lyon; HC Havre
- National team: Poland
- Playing career: 1980–2004

Andrzej Świstak (born 2 June 1963) is a Polish former ice hockey player and coach. He played for Podhale Nowy Targ, Les Orques d'Anglet, Rapaces de Gap, Girondins de Bordeaux, Flammes Bleues de Reims, Aquitains de Bordeaux, Dogues de Bordeaux, Bélougas de Toulouse, Lions de Lyon, and HC Havre during his career. Świstak also played for the Polish national team at the 1992 Winter Olympics and 1992 World Championship. At the 1983 World Junior Pool B Championship in Anglet, France, Świstak defected and remained in France. After his playing career he turned to coaching.
