= Mirosław Tomasik =

Polish ice hockey player

- Born: 26 May 1965 (age 59); Skawina, Poland
- Height: 5 ft 9 in (175 cm)
- Weight: 176 lb (80 kg; 12 st 8 lb)
- Position: Centre
- Played for: Podhale Nowy Targ; Kristianstads IK; Unia Oświęcim
- National team: Poland
- Playing career: 1987–2000

Mirosław Tomasz Tomasik (born 26 May 1965) is a Polish former ice hockey player. He played for Podhale Nowy Targ, Kristianstads IK, and Unia Oświęcim during his career. He also played for the Polish national team at the 1992 Winter Olympics and multiple World Championships.
