= Lars Edström =

Swedish actor

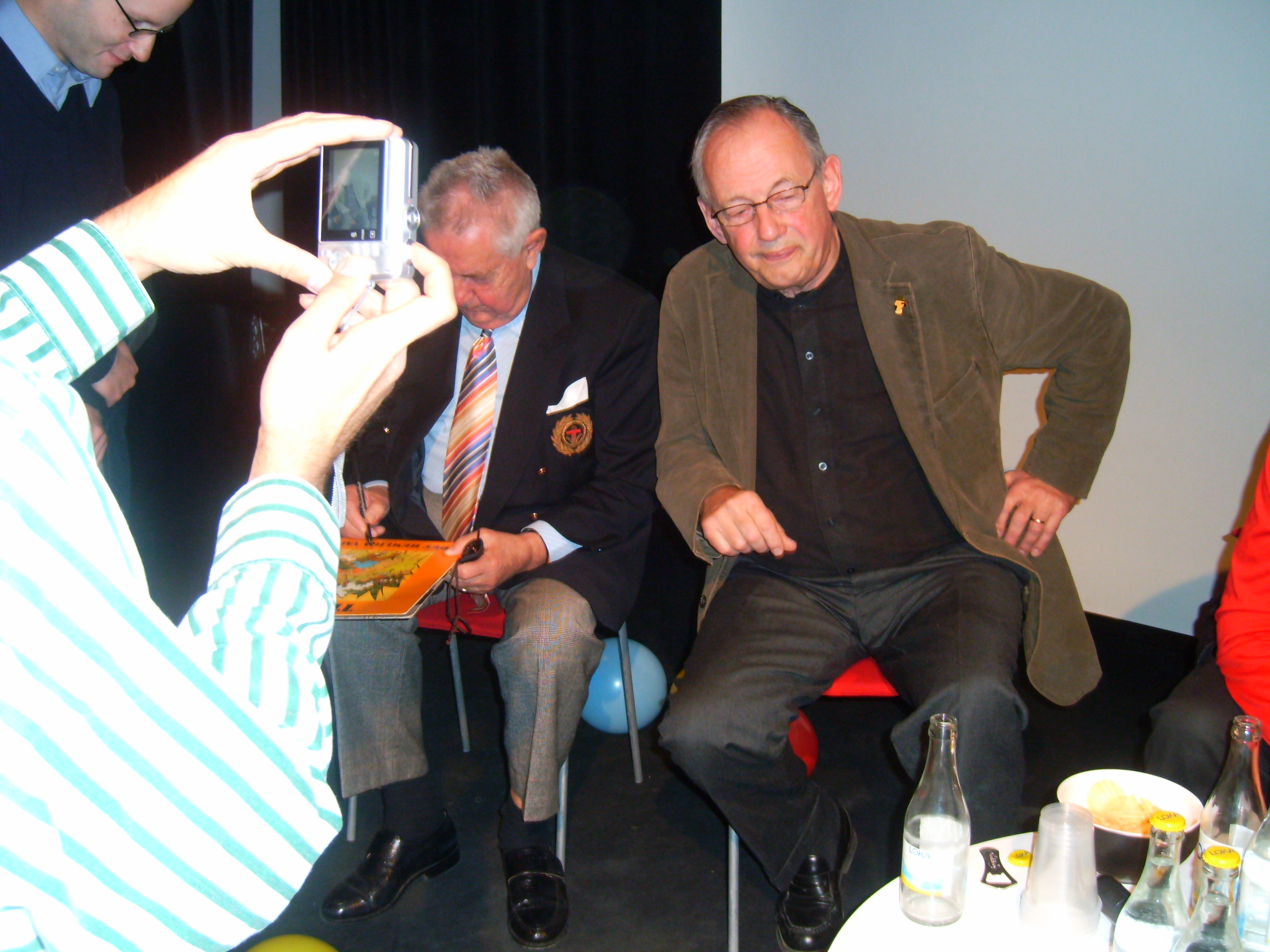
- Edström in 2007
- Born: 10 July 1935 (age 91); Stockholm, Sweden
- Occupation: Actor
- Years active: 1959-2002

Lars Edström (born 10 July 1935) is a Swedish actor. He has appeared in 24 films and television shows between 1959 and 2002.

== Selected filmography ==
- Ormen (1966)
- Mästerdetektiven Blomkvist på nya äventyr (1966)
- Elvis! Elvis! (1976)
