= Georg Holzmann =

German ice hockey player (born 1961)

Personal information
- Nationality: German
- Born: 5 March 1961 (age 64) Füssen, West Germany

Sport
- Sport: Ice hockey

Georg Holzmann (born 5 March 1961) is a German former ice hockey player. He competed in the men's tournaments at the 1988 Winter Olympics and the 1992 Winter Olympics.
