= Méribel Ice Palace =

Indoor arena in Méribel, France

Coordinates: 45°23′37.12″N 6°33′57.18″E

Méribel Ice Palace is an indoor ice hockey arena in Méribel, France. It was built in 1991 and held 8,000 people when it opened. The ice hockey games from the 1992 Winter Olympics were held at this arena. After the Olympics the name of the arena changed to the Patinoire Olympique (Olympic Skating Rink), the capacity was reduced to 2,400, and part of the arena was converted into a swimming pool, restaurant, and other uses.

== Competitions ==
During the Albertville 92 Olympic Winter Games, the ice rink hosted 46 ice hockey matches from February 8 to 23, 1992. The final between Canada and the CIS was won by the former USSR's Unified Team.

Since 2007, the Méribel rink has also been the playing field for the finalist teams in the Ice Hockey League Cup.
