= Marek Batkiewicz =

Polish ice hockey player

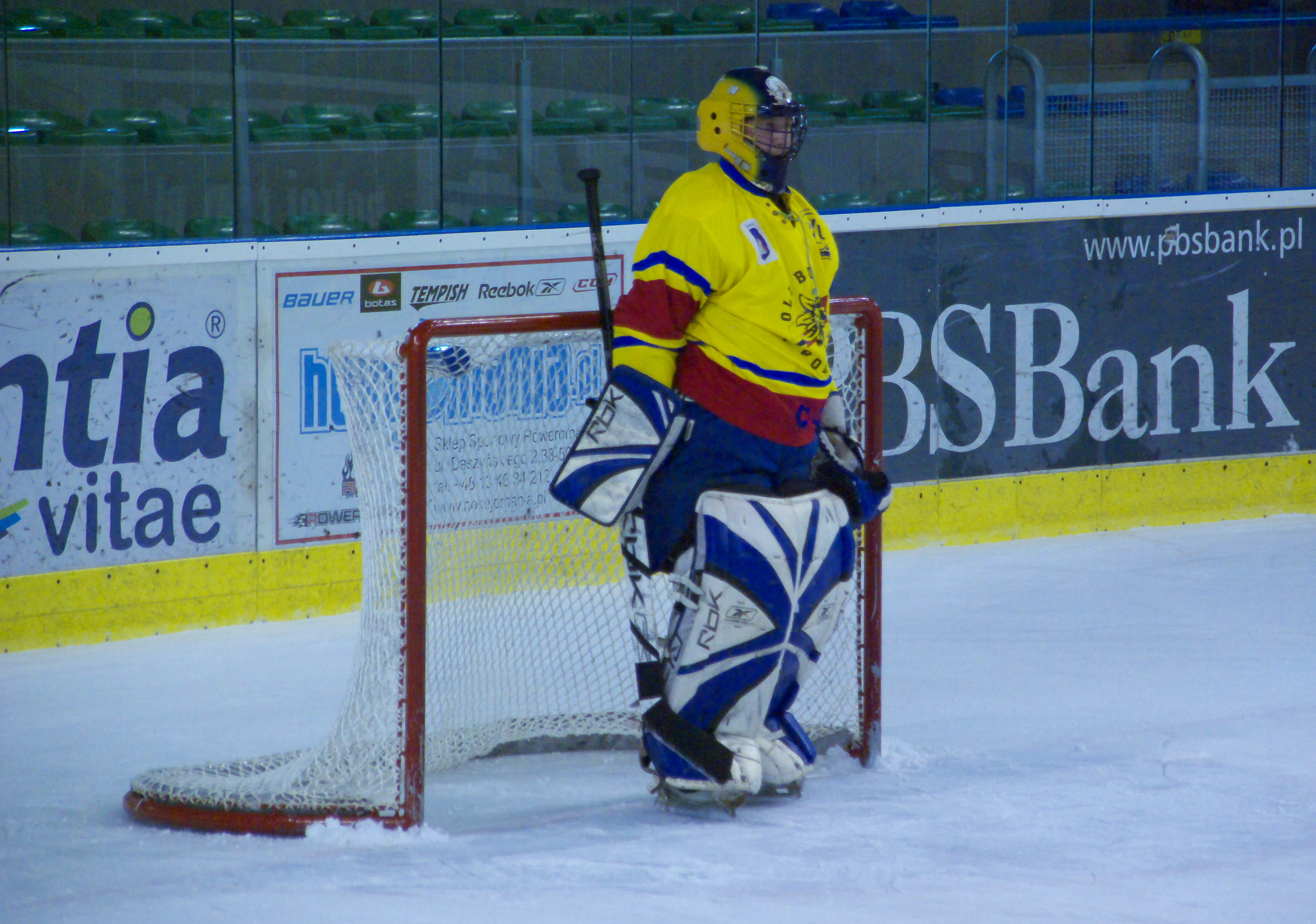
- Batkiewicz in 2012
- Born: 14 August 1969 (age 55); Nowy Targ, Poland
- Height: 6 ft 0 in (183 cm)
- Weight: 185 lb (84 kg; 13 st 3 lb)
- Position: Goaltender
- Caught: Left
- Played for: KTH Krynica; Podhale Nowy Targ; GKS Katowice
- National team: Poland
- Playing career: 1986–2007

Marek Rafał Batkiewicz (born 14 August 1969) is a Polish former ice hockey player. He played for several teams during his career, most notably with Podhale Nowy Targ. He also played for the Polish national team at the 1992 Winter Olympics and several World Championships.
