= Eirik Paulsen =

Norwegian ice hockey player (born 1970)

Personal information
- Born: 21 May 1970 (age 55) Stavanger, Norway

Sport
- Sport: Ice hockey

Eirik Paulsen (born 21 May 1970) is a Norwegian former ice hockey player. He was born in Stavanger, Norway and played for the club Viking IK. He played for the Norwegian national ice hockey team at the 1992 Winter Olympics.
