= Michał Kieca =

Polish footballer (born 1999)

Personal information
- Full name: Michał Kieca
- Date of birth: 23 July 1999 (age 27)
- Place of birth: Katowice, Poland
- Height: 1.65 m (5 ft 5 in)
- Position: Midfielder

Team information
- Current team: Przemsza Siewierz
- Number: 28

Youth career
- 2007–2009: Zagłębie Sosnowiec
- 2009–2012: APN Czeladź
- 2012–2015: Ruch Chorzów
- 2015–2018: Zagłębie Sosnowiec

Senior career*
Years	Team	Apps	(Gls)
2017–2021	Zagłębie Sosnowiec	8	(0)
2018	→ Piast Żmigród (loan)	16	(2)
2018–2019	→ Skra Częstochowa (loan)	33	(4)
2020	→ Skra Częstochowa (loan)	13	(0)
2021	Bytovia Bytów	16	(0)
2021–2022	Piast Żmigród	33	(0)
2022	Przemsza Siewierz	11	(1)
2024–	Przemsza Siewierz	15	(2)
- * Club domestic league appearances and goals as of 11:10, 23 July 2024 (UTC)

Michał Kieca (born 23 July 1999) is a Polish professional footballer who plays as a midfielder for IV liga Silesia club Przemsza Siewierz.

== Club career ==
=== Zagłębie Sosnowiec ===
Kieca started playing at Zagłębie Sosnowiec as a youth, and later left to play for APN Czeladź and Ruch Chorzów, before returning to Zagłębie in 2015. In 2016, 17-year old Kieca scored 20 goals in 25 games for Zagłębie's U19s. He was promoted to the first team squad in the summer 2017 and also scored in a pre-season friendly against ŁKS Łódź in that summer.

On 2 August 2017, he signed a deal until the end of 2020. However, he was loaned out to III liga club Piast Żmigród in March 2018 for the rest of the season, to gain more experience. Kieca played 16 games and scored two goals for the club. Returning from loan in the summer 2018, he was immediately loaned out to II liga club Skra Częstochowa for the 2018–19 season.

After returning from loan, Kieca got his official debut on 26 September 2019 against ŁKS Łódź. He signed a new deal with the club until 30 June 2022 on the same day.

At the end of 2019, Kieca was one out of six players that was on Zagłębie's transfer list, after playing only 16 minutes in the league and 90 minutes in the cup in the 2019–20 season. However, he ended up re-joining Skra Częstochowa on loan in January 2020 for the rest of the season.

In the first 10 league games of the 2020–21 season, Kieca was used six times as a substitute.

=== Bytovia Bytów ===
On 28 January 2021, Kieca joined II liga club Bytovia Bytów on a deal for the rest of the season. Kieca left the club again at the end of the season, where his contract expired.

=== Later career ===
On 26 July 2021, Kieca returned to his former club, Piast Żmigród. He got his debut on 7 August 2021 against Odra Wodzisław. In August 2022, Kieca joined Polish amateur side Przemsza Siewierz.
