= Alessio Bertaggia =

Swiss professional ice hockey player

- Born: July 30, 1993 (age 32) Lugano, Switzerland
- Height: 5 ft 9 in (175 cm)
- Weight: 170 lb (77 kg; 12 st 2 lb)
- Position: Right wing
- Shoots: Left
- NL team Former teams: HC Lugano; Brandon Wheat Kings; EV Zug; HC Lugano; Genève-Servette HC
- NHL draft: Undrafted
- Playing career: 2011–present

Alessio Bertaggia (born July 30, 1993) is a Swiss professional ice hockey player who is currently playing with HC Lugano of the National League (NL).

== Playing career ==
He formerly played junior hockey in North America for the Brandon Wheat Kings and the Spokane Chiefs of the Western Hockey League. He recorded a hat trick in his WHL debut, a 4-1 win over the Moose Jaw Warriors. Undrafted, he returned to Switzerland after two seasons, as he earlier signed for EV Zug of the NLA on a two-year deal on December 19, 2012.

On 12 November 2014, Bertaggia was traded to HC Lugano where he played until the 2021-22 season. On 3 December 2021, Bertaggia signed a 5-year contract with Genève-Servette HC starting with the 2022-23 season.

On 2 June 2025, Genève-Servette and HC Lugano traded Bertaggia with Matthew Verboon.

== Personal ==
His father is the former professional hockey player, Sandro Bertaggia, who also played with HC Lugano and had his number retired by the club.

== Career statistics ==
=== Regular season and playoffs ===
			Regular season					Playoffs
Season	Team	League	GP	G	A	Pts	PIM	GP	G	A	Pts	PIM
2010–11	HC Lugano	NLA	29	1	3	4	4	—	—	—	—	—
2011–12	Brandon Wheat Kings	WHL	64	24	26	50	62	9	4	3	7	2
2012–13	Brandon Wheat Kings	WHL	30	16	18	34	30	—	—	—	—	—
2012–13	Spokane Chiefs	WHL	16	13	6	19	4	9	2	6	8	10
2013–14	EV Zug	NLA	50	7	5	12	34	—	—	—	—	—
2014–15	EV Zug	NLA	18	0	1	1	4	—	—	—	—	—
2014–15	HC Lugano	NLA	31	8	3	11	18	6	0	0	0	0
2015–16	HC Lugano	NLA	45	14	13	27	12	15	2	4	6	8
2016–17	HC Lugano	NLA	45	3	16	19	59	11	2	3	5	4
2017–18	HC Lugano	NL	49	4	9	13	36	18	4	2	6	18
2018–19	HC Lugano	NL	41	7	9	16	38	4	0	2	2	4
2019–20	HC Lugano	NL	50	17	10	27	20	—	—	—	—	—
2020–21	HC Lugano	NL	44	10	13	23	22	5	0	2	2	16
2021–22	HC Lugano	NL	47	8	15	23	22	6	1	0	1	2
NL totals			449	79	97	176	269	65	9	13	22	52

=== International ===
Year	Team	Event	Result	GP	G	A	Pts	PIM
2011	Switzerland	U18	7th	6	1	2	3	4
2012	Switzerland	WJC	8th	6	1	3	4	2
2013	Switzerland	WJC	6th	6	2	2	4	2
Junior totals				18	4	7	11	8
