= Marius Rath =

Norwegian ice hockey player

Personal information
- Born: 27 May 1970 (age 56) Oslo, Norway

Sport
- Sport: Ice hockey
- Club: Vålerengens IF

Marius Rath (born 27 May 1970) is a former Norwegian ice hockey player.

== Life and career ==
Rath was born in Oslo on 27 May 1970, and played for the club Vålerengens IF. He played for the Norwegian national ice hockey team at the 1992 and 1994 Winter Olympics.

Rath won eight national titles with Vålerenga between 1987 and 2003.
