= Michael Rumrich =

German ice hockey player

Personal information
- Nationality: German
- Born: 1 July 1965 (age 59); Markt Indersdorf, West Germany

Sport
- Sport: Ice hockey

Michael Rumrich (born 1 July 1965) is a German former ice hockey player. He competed in the men's tournaments at the 1992 Winter Olympics and the 1994 Winter Olympics.
