= Peter Almásy =

French ice hockey player

Personal information
- Nationality: French
- Born: 11 February 1961 (age 64) Poprad, Czechoslovakia

Sport
- Sport: Ice hockey

Peter Almásy (born 11 February 1961) is a French ice hockey player. He competed in the men's tournaments at the 1988 Winter Olympics and the 1992 Winter Olympics.
