= Helmut de Raaf =

German ice hockey player and coach

- Born: November 5, 1961 (age 63); Neuss, West Germany
- Height: 6 ft 1 in (185 cm)
- Weight: 174 lb (79 kg; 12 st 6 lb)
- Position: Goaltender
- Caught: Left
- Played for: Düsseldorfer EG; Kölner EC; Adler Mannheim
- National team: West Germany and Germany
- NHL draft: Undrafted
- Playing career: 1981–2001

Helmut de Raaf (born November 5, 1961) is a German former professional ice hockey goaltender. He is a member of the German ice hockey Hall of Fame.

== Playing career ==
He made his debut in German top-flight Eishockey-Bundesliga for Düsseldorfer EG during the 1981-82 season. In 1983, de Raaf signed with local rivals Kölner EC and moved back to Düsseldorf in 1988. At the end of his playing career, he played for Adler Mannheim. De Raaf has won eleven German national championships as a player (84, 86, 87, 88, 90, 91, 92, 93, 96, 00, 01) and was named German ice hockey player of the year in the 92-93 season.

== International ==
De Raaf competed for West Germany in the 1988 Winter Olympics, and for Germany in the 1992 and 1994 Winter Olympics. He also competed in five ice Hockey World Championships for West Germany/Germany between 1985 and 1993. He won a total of 114 caps for the German national team.

== Coaching career ==
A longtime head coach of Adler Mannheim's under 18 squad, he led the team to several German championship titles. He was named an assistant coach of the Germany national ice hockey team for competition at the 2014 IIHF World Championship. From 2013 to 2015, de Raaf served as assistant coach of EHC München in the Deutsche Eishockey Liga (DEL), followed by a single season as head coach of fellow DEL team Schwenninger Wild Wings.

In March 2016, he accepted the position as director of an ice hockey academy in Liefering.
