= Sandro Bertaggia =

Swiss ice hockey player

- Born: 7 May 1964 (age 60); Zug, Switzerland
- Height: 5 ft 9 in (175 cm)
- Weight: 187 lb (85 kg; 13 st 5 lb)
- Position: Defence
- Shot: Left
- NLA team: HC Lugano
- National team: Switzerland
- NHL draft: Undrafted
- Playing career: 1984–2003

Sandro Bertaggia (born 7 May 1964) is a former Swiss professional ice hockey defenceman who competed in ice hockey at the 1992 Winter Olympics as a member of the Switzerland men's national ice hockey team.

His son is the professional hockey player, Alessio Bertaggia.
