= Rafał Sroka =

Polish ice hockey player

- Born: November 29, 1970 (age 54); Nowy Targ, Poland
- Height: 6 ft 2 in (188 cm)
- Weight: 205 lb (93 kg; 14 st 9 lb)
- Position: Defence
- Shot: Right
- Played for: Podhale Nowy Targ; HC Banská Bystrica
- National team: Poland
- Playing career: 1991–2010

Rafał Sroka (born 29 November 1970) is a Polish former ice hockey player. He played for Podhale Nowy Targ and Hc Banská Bystrica during his career. Sroka also played for the Polish national team at the 1992 Winter Olympics.
