= Waldemar Klisiak =

Polish ice hockey player

- Born: May 6, 1967 (age 57); Oświęcim, Poland
- Height: 6 ft 0 in (183 cm)
- Weight: 194 lb (88 kg; 13 st 12 lb)
- Position: Right wing
- Shot: Right
- Played for: Unia Oświęcim; Sport; HC Vítkovice; HC Val; Zagłębie Sosnowiec; Naprzód Janów
- National team: Poland
- Playing career: 1986–2011

Waldemar Stanisław Klisiak (born 6 May 1967) is a Polish former ice hockey player. He played for Unia Oświęcim, Sport, HC Vítkovice, HC Val, Zagłębie Sosnowiec, and Naprzód Janów during his career. With Unia Oświęcim he won the Polish league championship six times, in 1992 and from 1999 to 2003. In 1993 Klisiak was named the best player in the Polish league. He also played for the Polish national team at the 1992 Winter Olympics and several World Championships. After his playing career Klisiak became a coach.
