= Tom Johansen =

Norwegian ice hockey player

Personal information
- Born: 19 July 1967 (age 57); Oslo, Norway

Sport
- Sport: Ice hockey

Tom Johansen (born 19 July 1967) is a Norwegian former ice hockey player. He was born in Oslo, Norway. He played for the Norwegian national ice hockey team at the 1992 and 1994 Winter Olympics.
