= Jan Viktorsson =

Swedish ice hockey player

- Born: July 27, 1964 (age 61) Stockholm, Sweden
- Height: 5 ft 8 in (173 cm)
- Weight: 165 lb (75 kg; 11 st 11 lb)
- Position: Forward
- Shot: Left
- Played for: Djurgårdens IF; Graz EC
- National team: Sweden
- Playing career: 1982–1999

Jan Bo Viktorsson (born July 27, 1964 in Stockholm, Sweden) is a retired Swedish ice hockey player. Viktorsson played for his home town club Djurgårdens IF during most of his career, except for two seasons with Austrian side Graz EC. He played a total of 584 Elitserien games for Djurgården and scored 330 points before ending his career in 1999. Viktorsson is currently working for Djurgården as a salesman.

== Career statistics ==
=== Regular season and playoffs ===
			Regular season					Playoffs
Season	Team	League	GP	G	A	Pts	PIM	GP	G	A	Pts	PIM
1982–83	Djurgårdens IF	SEL	4	0	0	0	0	—	—	—	—	—
1983–84	Djurgårdens IF	SEL	14	1	4	5	4	1	0	0	0	0
1984–85	Djurgårdens IF	SEL	26	10	3	13	28	8	3	0	3	6
1985–86	Djurgårdens IF	SEL	35	4	4	8	8	—	—	—	—	—
1986–87	Djurgårdens IF	SEL	34	10	10	20	8	2	1	0	1	2
1987–88	Djurgårdens IF	SEL	40	23	17	40	16	3	1	0	1	0
1988–89	Djurgårdens IF	SEL	36	16	15	31	16	8	3	3	6	8
1989–90	Djurgårdens IF	SEL	38	18	14	32	24	7	1	2	3	0
1990–91	Djurgårdens IF	SEL	35	11	19	30	20	7	1	6	7	0
1991–92	Djurgårdens IF	SEL	39	10	15	25	32	10	2	2	4	4
1992–93	Djurgårdens IF	SEL	37	4	8	12	18	6	1	1	2	4
1993–94	Graz EC	AUT	57	33	45	78	55	—	—	—	—	—
1994–95	Graz EC	AUT	36	24	26	50	—	—	—	—	—	—
1995–96	Djurgårdens IF	SEL	38	7	6	13	22	4	2	0	2	2
1996–97	Djurgårdens IF	SEL	46	11	12	23	41	4	1	1	2	0
1997–98	Djurgårdens IF	SEL	43	6	11	17	18	12	2	2	4	31
1998–99	Djurgårdens IF	SEL	44	12	10	22	18	4	2	3	5	0
SEL totals			509	143	148	291	273	76	20	20	40	57

=== International ===
Year	Team	Event	GP	G	A	Pts	PIM
1991	Sweden	WC	10	1	1	2	6
1992	Sweden	OG	8	0	2	2	0
Senior totals			18	1	3	4	6
