= Anthony Circelli =

Italian ice hockey player (born 1961)

Personal information
- Nationality: Italian
- Born: 18 November 1961 (age 63); Toronto, Ontario, Canada

Sport
- Sport: Ice hockey

Anthony Circelli (born 18 November 1961) is an Italian ice hockey player. He competed in the men's tournaments at the 1992 Winter Olympics and the 1994 Winter Olympics.
