= Kazimierz Jurek =

Polish ice hockey player

- Born: March 2, 1964 (age 61); Nowy Targ, Poland
- Height: 5 ft 9 in (175 cm)
- Weight: 168 lb (76 kg; 12 st 0 lb)
- Position: Defence
- Played for: HC Gap; Bordeaux Gironde Hockey 2000; Hockey Club de Reims; Brest Albatros Hockey
- National team: Poland
- Playing career: 1987–2007

Kazimierz Jurek (born 2 March 1964), is a Polish former ice hockey player. He played for HC Gap, Bordeaux Gironde Hockey 2000, Hockey Club de Reims, and Brest Albatros Hockey during his career. He also played for the Polish national team at the 1992 Winter Olympics and the 1992 World Championship. During the 1984 World Junior Championships Pool B tournament, held in Caen, France, Jurek defected and remained in France.
