= Alfred Lüthi (ice hockey) =

Swiss ice hockey player (born 1961)

- Born: 31 July 1961 (age 65) Switzerland
- Height: 6 ft 0 in (183 cm)
- Weight: 176 lb (80 kg; 12 st 8 lb)
- Position: Centre
- Shot: Left
- Played for: NLA; HC Lugano; EHC Biel; HC Fribourg-Gottéron
- National team: Switzerland
- NHL draft: Undrafted
- Playing career: 1984–1997

Alfred Lüthi (born 31 July 1961) is a Swiss former professional ice hockey player. He competed with the Switzerland men's national ice hockey team at both the 1988 and 1992 Winter Olympic Games, as well as the 1987, 1991 and 1992 Men's World Ice Hockey Championships.
