= Josef Heiß =

German ice hockey player

- Born: June 13, 1963 (age 61); Garmisch-Partenkirchen, FRG
- Height: 5 ft 10 in (178 cm)
- Weight: 187 lb (85 kg; 13 st 5 lb)
- Position: Goaltender
- Caught: Left
- Played for: SC Riessersee; Düsseldorfer EG; Kölner Haie
- National team: Germany
- Playing career: 1980–2001

Joseph "Peppi" Heiß (born 13 June 1963 in Garmisch-Partenkirchen, West Germany) is a retired German ice hockey goaltender.

He started his career with SC Riessersee in 1980. He played for Riessersee, Düsseldorfer EG and Kölner Haie.

After playing about 1200 games in the German League and 140 games for the German national men's hockey team he retired in 2001 because of a knee injury.

His daughter Stella Heiß is a successful curler who represented Germany at the 2010 Winter Olympics. At seventeen years, she was the youngest curler at the Games.

== Career accomplishments ==
- German Champion 1981, 1995
- Ice Hockey World Championships-Participation 1990 (7th Place), 1991 (8th), 1992 (6th), 1993 (5th), 1994 (9th), 1995 (9th), 1996 (8th), 1997 (11th), 1998 (11th)
- Winter Olympics-Participation Albertville 1992 (6th), Lillehammer 1994 (7th), Nagano 1998 (9th)
- World Cup of Hockey 1996 (8th)
