= John Vecchiarelli =

Italian ice hockey player

Personal information
- Nationality: Italian
- Born: 4 July 1964 (age 60); Toronto, Ontario, Canada

Sport
- Sport: Ice hockey

John Vecchiarelli (born 4 July 1964) is an Italian ice hockey player. He competed in the men's tournament at the 1992 Winter Olympics.
