= Emilio Iovio =

Italian ice hockey player (born 1962)

Personal information
- Nationality: Italian
- Born: 9 March 1962 (age 63) Hamilton, Ontario, Canada

Sport
- Sport: Ice hockey

Emilio Iovio (born 9 March 1962) is an Italian ice hockey player. He competed in the men's tournaments at the 1992 Winter Olympics and the 1994 Winter Olympics.
