= 1991–92 Polska Liga Hokejowa season =

Polish ice hockey season

The 1991–92 Polska Liga Hokejowa season was the 57th season of the Polska Liga Hokejowa, the top level of ice hockey in Poland. 10 teams participated in the league, and Unia Oswiecim won the championship.

== First round ==
	Club	GP	W	T	L	Goals	Pts
1.	Polonia Bytom	18	15	0	3	95:38	30
2.	Unia Oświęcim	18	14	1	3	110:55	29
3.	Podhale Nowy Targ	18	14	0	4	108:32	28
4.	Naprzód Janów	18	12	0	6	91:60	24
5.	Towimor Torun	18	9	1	8	83:74	19
6.	GKS Tychy	18	8	1	9	85:79	17
7.	GKS Katowice	18	7	2	9	95:95	16
8.	KS Cracovia	18	4	2	12	50:90	10
9.	Zofiowka Jasztrebie	18	3	1	14	57:121	7
10.	Zagłębie Sosnowiec	18	0	0	18	27:157	0

== Final round ==
	Club	GP	W	T	L	Goals	Pts
1.	Podhale Nowy Targ	28	23	0	5	156:52	46
2.	Polonia Bytom	28	21	1	6	127:62	43
3.	Unia Oświęcim	28	19	2	7	153:87	40
4.	Naprzód Janów	28	15	0	13	116:105	30
5.	GKS Tychy	28	12	2	14	116:117	26
6.	Towimor Torun	28	10	2	16	103:114	22

== Qualification round ==
	Club	GP	W	T	L	Goals	Pts
7.	GKS Katowice	22	10	2	10	132:109	22
8.	KS Cracovia	22	7	2	13	71:108	16
9.	Zofiowka Jasztrebie	22	3	1	18	65:155	7

== Playoffs ==
=== Quarterfinals ===
- Polonia Bytom - GKS Katowice 2:1 (2:0, 1:6, 5:1)
- Unia Oświęcim - Towimor Torun 2:1 (8:1, 3:4, 3:0)
- Podhale Nowy Targ - KS Cracovia 2:0 (3:2, 3:1)
- Naprzód Janów - GKS Tychy 2:0 (3:2, 5:3)

=== Semifinals ===
- Polonia Bytom - Unia Oświęcim 2:3 (5:0, 1:5, 5:2, 2:3, 2:3)
- Podhale Nowy Targ - Naprzód Janów 1:3 (3:2, 1:2, 2:3 SO, 2:4)

=== Final ===
- Unia Oświęcim - Naprzód Janów 3:2 (6:4, 4:7, 4:3, 2:3, 7:1)

== Placing round ==
=== 7th place ===
- GKS Tychy - Towimor Torun 3:5/4:4

=== 5th place ===
- GKS Katowice - KS Cracovia 5:6/2:5

=== 3rd place ===
- Podhale Nowy Targ - Polonia Bytom 3:0 (7:2, 4:2, 3:2)
