= Mariusz Kieca =

Polish ice hockey player

- Born: 5 November 1969 (age 55); Sosnowiec, Poland
- Height: 5 ft 11 in (180 cm)
- Weight: 172 lb (78 kg; 12 st 4 lb)
- Position: Goaltender
- Caught: Left
- Played for: KTH Krynica; GKS Tychy; SMS Warszawa; GKS Katowice; Cracovia
- National team: Poland
- Playing career: 1987–2003

Mariusz Waldemar Kieca (born 5 November 1969) is a Polish former ice hockey player. During his career he played for KTH Krynica, GKS Tychy, SMS Warszawa, GKS Katowice, and Cracovia Kraków. He also played for the Polish national team at the 1992 Winter Olympics and several World Championships.
