= David Delfino =

Italian ice hockey player

Personal information
- Nationality: Italian
- Born: 29 December 1965 (age 60) Somerville, Massachusetts, United States

Sport
- Sport: Ice hockey

David Delfino (born 29 December 1965) is an Italian ice hockey player. He competed in the men's tournaments at the 1992 Winter Olympics and the 1994 Winter Olympics.
