= Peter Schlagenhauf =

Swiss ice hockey player

- Born: March 19, 1960 (age 65); Switzerland
- Height: 5 ft 11 in (180 cm)
- Weight: 176 lb (80 kg; 12 st 8 lb)
- Position: Right wing
- Played for: Kloten Flyers; GCK Lions
- National team: Switzerland
- Playing career: 1976–1992

Peter Schlagenhauf (born March 19, 1960) is a retired Swiss professional ice hockey right winger who last played for GCK Lions in the National League B. He also represented the Swiss national team at several international tournaments, including the 1988 Winter Olympics.

== Career statistics ==
			Regular season					Playoffs
Season	Team	League	GP	G	A	Pts	PIM	GP	G	A	Pts	PIM
1977–78	EHC Kloten	NLA	—	—	—	—	—	—	—	—	—	—
1978–79	EHC Kloten	NLA	—	—	—	—	—	—	—	—	—	—
1979–80	EHC Kloten	NLA	—	—	—	—	—	—	—	—	—	—
1980–81	EHC Kloten	NLA	—	—	—	—	—	—	—	—	—	—
1981–82	EHC Kloten	NLA	38	32	15	47	—	—	—	—	—	—
1982–83	EHC Kloten	NLA	38	32	25	57	—	—	—	—	—	—
1983–84	EHC Kloten	NLA	27	25	13	38	—	—	—	—	—	—
1984–85	EHC Kloten	NLA	33	21	—	—	—	—	—	—	—	—
1985–86	EHC Kloten	NLA	34	22	14	36	16	5	1	4	5	0
1986–87	EHC Kloten	NLA	28	16	14	30	14	8	4	3	7	4
1987–88	EHC Kloten	NLA	34	15	25	40	20	7	2	3	5	6
1988–89	EHC Kloten	NLA	36	29	28	57	39	6	4	3	7	12
1989–90	EHC Kloten	NLA	33	20	19	39	22	5	0	3	3	7
1990–91	EHC Kloten	NLA	33	19	22	41	18	8	5	3	8	6
1991–92	EHC Kloten	NLA	36	17	9	26	33	3	0	0	0	4
1992–93	EHC Kloten	NLA	35	23	15	38	35	11	5	4	9	6
1993–94	EHC Kloten	NLA	31	8	4	12	30	12	6	4	10	2
1994–95	Grasshopper Club Zurich	NLB	36	21	22	43	18	12	7	3	10	0
1995–96	Grasshopper Club Zurich	NLB	23	9	9	18	10	10	5	4	9	2
1996–97	Grasshopper Club Zurich	NLB	42	7	11	18	10	10	1	2	3	22
NLA totals			436	279	203	461	227	65	27	27	54	47
NLB totals			101	37	42	79	32	32	13	9	22	24
