= Pietro Cunti =

Swiss ice hockey player

- Born: 3 September 1962 (age 62); Chur, Switzerland
- Height: 5 ft 11 in (180 cm)
- Weight: 181 lb (82 kg; 12 st 13 lb)
- Position: Centre
- Shot: Left
- Played for: EHC Chur; EHC Arosa; SC Bern
- National team: Switzerland
- Playing career: 1980–1991

Pietro Cunti (born 3 September 1962) is a former Swiss professional ice hockey centre who last played for SC Bern in Switzerland's National League A.

Cunti has participated as a member of the Swiss national team at the 1988 Winter Olympics.

== Career statistics ==
			Regular season					Playoffs
Season	Team	League	GP	G	A	Pts	PIM	GP	G	A	Pts	PIM
1979–80	EHC Arosa U20	Elite Jr. A	—	—	—	—	—	—	—	—	—	—
1979–80	EHC Arosa	NLA	—	—	—	—	—	—	—	—	—	—
1980–81	EHC Arosa U20	Elite Jr. A	—	—	—	—	—	—	—	—	—	—
1980–81	EHC Arosa	NLA	1	0	0	0	0	—	—	—	—	—
1981–82	EHC Arosa	NLA	2	1	0	1	0	—	—	—	—	—
1981–82	EHC Arosa U20	Elite Jr. A	—	—	—	—	—	—	—	—	—	—
1982–83	EHC Arosa	NLA	38	6	8	14	12	—	—	—	—	—
1983–84	EHC Arosa	NLA	40	16	14	30	—	—	—	—	—	—
1984–85	EHC Arosa	NLA	38	16	13	29	—	—	—	—	—	—
1985–86	EHC Arosa	NLA	36	31	21	52	50	—	—	—	—	—
1986–87	EHC Chur	NLA	34	17	23	40	46	—	—	—	—	—
1987–88	SC Bern	NLA	36	18	26	44	30	—	—	—	—	—
1988–89	SC Bern	NLA	35	25	18	43	24	9	2	2	4	16
1989–90	SC Bern	NLA	17	8	6	14	28	11	3	0	3	8
1990–91	SC Bern	NLA	36	19	19	38	40	10	8	2	10	14
NLA totals			313	157	148	305	230	30	13	4	17	38
