= Jörg Eberle =

Swiss ice hockey player

- Born: February 9, 1962 (age 63); Häggenschwil, Switzerland
- Height: 6 ft 0 in (183 cm)
- Weight: 198 lb (90 kg; 14 st 2 lb)
- Position: Right wing
- Shot: Left
- Played for: NLA; HC Lugano; HC Davos; Kloten Flyers; EV Zug
- National team: Switzerland
- NHL draft: Undrafted
- Playing career: 1982–1999

Jörg Eberle (born February 9, 1962) is a Swiss former professional ice hockey player. He competed with the Switzerland men's national ice hockey team at both the 1988 and 1992 Winter Olympic Games, as well as the 1992 and 1993 Men's World Ice Hockey Championships.

== Career statistics ==
			Regular season					Playoffs
Season	Team	League	GP	G	A	Pts	PIM	GP	G	A	Pts	PIM
1981–82	SC Herisau	NLB	—	30	20	50	—	—	—	—	—	—
1982–83	HC Lugano	NLA	37	22	15	37	—	—	—	—	—	—
1983–84	HC Davos	NLA	40	30	21	51	—	—	—	—	—	—
1984–85	HC Davos	NLA	38	25	17	42	—	—	—	—	—	—
1985–86	HC Lugano	NLA	33	26	10	36	29	4	4	5	9	6
1986–87	HC Lugano	NLA	30	24	10	34	18	3	2	2	4	2
1987–88	HC Lugano	NLA	35	28	14	42	26	7	5	2	7	8
1988–89	HC Lugano	NLA	36	34	16	50	16	10	4	6	10	13
1989–90	HC Lugano	NLA	34	20	10	30	17	9	6	7	13	2
1990–91	HC Lugano	NLA	36	28	12	40	37	11	6	2	8	6
1991–92	HC Lugano	NLA	35	9	10	19	22	4	2	2	4	13
1992–93	HC Lugano	NLA	36	18	5	23	36	9	1	1	2	2
1993–94	HC Lugano	NLA	35	17	9	26	30	9	5	6	11	0
1994–95	HC Lugano	NLA	34	13	10	23	40	1	0	0	0	0
1995–96	HC Lugano	NLA	36	13	8	21	6	4	0	1	1	2
1996–97	EHC Kloten	NLA	46	13	16	29	41	4	0	0	0	0
1997–98	EV Zug	NLA	39	11	8	19	33	20	4	6	10	4
1998–99	EV Zug	NLA	42	6	9	15	20	11	3	1	4	2
NLA totals			622	337	200	537	371	106	42	41	83	60
