= Martin Rauch =

Swiss ice hockey player

- Born: June 15, 1965 Bern, Switzerland
- Height: 6 ft 1 in (185 cm)
- Weight: 192 lb (87 kg; 13 st 10 lb)
- Position: Defence
- Shot: Left
- Played for: SC Bern; HC Fribourg-Gottéron; HC Ambri-Piotta; EHC Biel; EHC Olten; HC Ajoie
- National team: Switzerland
- Playing career: 1985–2015

Martin Rauch (born June 15, 1965 in Bern, Switzerland) is a professional ice hockey defender. He played for the junior teams of the EHC Rot-Blau Bern ice hockey team until he started his pro career with the SC Bern hockey team.

== Achievements ==
- 1989 - NLA Champion with SC Bern
- 1991 - NLA Champion with SC Bern
- 1992 - NLA Champion with SC Bern
- 1997 - NLA Champion with SC Bern

== Awards ==
- His jersey number 7 has been retired by the SC Bern.

== Records ==
Martin Rauch is, together with Gil Montandon, Martin Steinegger and Ronnie Rüeger, one of the only players to have played more than 1000 games in the NL leagues (NLA & NLB)

== International play ==
Martin Rauch played a total of 116 games for the Swiss national team

== Career statistics ==
			Regular season					Playoffs
Season	Team	League	GP	G	A	Pts	PIM	GP	G	A	Pts	PIM
1985–86	SC Bern	NLA	36	5	6	11	14	5	0	1	1	2
1986–87	SC Bern	NLA	36	0	3	3	17	—	—	—	—	—
1987–88	SC Bern	NLA	36	2	6	8	16	—	—	—	—	—
1988–89	SC Bern	NLA	36	7	5	12	30	11	4	5	9	6
1989–90	SC Bern	NLA	36	2	11	13	24	11	0	3	3	12
1990–91	SC Bern	NLA	36	1	10	11	34	10	1	1	2	10
1991–92	SC Bern	NLA	34	0	10	10	50	11	0	4	4	12
1992–93	SC Bern	NLA	36	2	7	9	58	5	0	0	0	14
1993–94	SC Bern	NLA	36	5	13	18	24	5	2	2	4	10
1994–95	SC Bern	NLA	35	5	15	20	30	6	0	2	2	4
1995–96	SC Bern	NLA	35	2	5	7	28	11	0	1	1	8
1996–97	SC Bern	NLA	45	2	3	5	55	13	0	4	4	10
1997–98	SC Bern	NLA	40	4	15	19	32	7	0	3	3	2
1998–99	SC Bern	NLA	45	3	7	10	58	6	0	1	1	6
1999–00	SC Bern	NLA	45	2	5	7	38	5	1	0	1	20
2000–01	HC Fribourg-Gottéron	NLA	44	2	4	6	30	5	0	1	1	4
2001–02	HC Fribourg-Gottéron	NLA	44	1	2	3	30	5	0	0	0	2
2002–03	HC Ambrì-Piotta	NLA	44	0	1	1	20	4	0	0	0	4
2003–04	HC Ambrì-Piotta	NLA	48	2	6	8	24	7	0	0	0	2
2004–05	EHC Biel-Bienne	NLB	31	2	10	12	20	12	0	5	5	6
2005–06	EHC Olten	NLB	43	0	18	18	44	5	0	0	0	2
2006–07	EHC Olten	NLB	39	1	4	5	40	—	—	—	—	—
2006–07	HC Ajoie	NLB	2	0	0	0	0	6	1	1	2	2
2007–08	HC Ajoie	NLB	49	0	12	12	46	14	0	1	1	20
2008–09	HC Ajoie	NLB	47	2	8	10	52	10	1	2	3	0
2009–10	HC Ajoie	NLB	45	1	2	3	24	7	0	2	2	4
2010–11	HC Ajoie	NLB	44	0	6	6	97	7	0	0	0	4
2011–12	EHC Rot-Blau Bern-Bümpliz	SwissDiv2	18	3	6	9	8	8	2	0	2	6
2012–13	EHC Rot-Blau Bern-Bümpliz	SwissDiv2	17	2	4	6	34	8	0	4	4	6
2013–14	EHC Rot-Blau Bern-Bümpliz	SwissDiv2	17	4	1	5	16	8	2	5	7	2
2014–15	EHC Rot-Blau Bern-Bümpliz	SwissDiv2	—	—	—	—	—	2	0	1	1	2
NLA totals			711	42	128	170	598	122	8	27	35	126
NLB totals			336	11	66	77	337	66	2	12	14	40
