= Mario Brodmann =

Swiss ice hockey player

- Born: April 24, 1966 (age 58); Switzerland
- Height: 5 ft 9 in (175 cm)
- Weight: 176 lb (80 kg; 12 st 8 lb)
- Position: Forward
- NLB team Former teams: EHC Chur; NLA; ZSC Lions; EV Zug; HC Fribourg-Gottéron; HC Davos
- National team: Switzerland
- Playing career: 1985–2000

Mario Brodmann (born April 24, 1966) is a former Swiss professional ice hockey forward who last played for EHC Chur in Switzerland's National League B.

Brodmann has participated as a member of the Swiss national team in numerous international tournaments, including the 1992 Winter Olympics.

== Career statistics ==
			Regular season					Playoffs
Season	Team	League	GP	G	A	Pts	PIM	GP	G	A	Pts	PIM
1985–86	HC Davos	NLA	16	2	0	2	4	5	0	0	0	0
1986–87	HC Davos	NLA	36	8	4	12	28	7	0	2	2	4
1987–88	HC Davos	NLA	32	11	10	21	33	2	0	0	0	2
1988–89	HC Davos	NLA	31	14	8	22	42	—	—	—	—	—
1989–90	HC Fribourg-Gottéron	NLA	36	20	11	31	59	3	0	0	0	9
1990–91	HC Fribourg-Gottéron	NLA	36	27	18	45	79	8	2	4	6	44
1991–92	HC Fribourg-Gottéron	NLA	28	11	8	19	34	13	2	6	8	45
1992–93	HC Fribourg-Gottéron	NLA	34	8	7	15	63	11	2	1	3	24
1993–94	EV Zug	NLA	36	8	7	15	16	9	1	0	1	0
1994–95	Zürcher SC	NLA	29	2	5	7	16	5	0	0	0	0
1995–96	Zürcher SC	NLA	36	6	5	11	24	2	0	0	0	4
1996–97	Zürcher SC	NLA	45	7	4	11	18	5	1	0	1	6
1997–98	EHC Chur	NLB	40	29	27	56	27	9	6	5	11	10
1998–99	EHC Chur	NLB	40	24	23	47	39	18	10	6	16	50
1999–00	EHC Chur	NLB	35	14	9	23	54	16	4	7	11	8
2000–01	EHC Wettingen-Baden	SwissDiv3	9	16	8	24	—	2	6	1	7	—
NLA totals			395	124	87	211	416	80	15	18	33	146
