= Dan Poulin =

Canadian ice hockey player

- Born: September 19, 1957 Robertsonville, Quebec, Canada
- Died: January 2, 2015 (aged 57) Quebec City, Quebec, Canada
- Height: 5 ft 11 in (180 cm)
- Weight: 185 lb (84 kg; 13 st 3 lb)
- Position: Defence
- Shot: Right
- Played for: Minnesota North Stars
- NHL draft: 167th overall, 1977; Montreal Canadiens
- Playing career: 1977–1990

Joseph Gérard Daniel Poulin (September 19, 1957 – January 2, 2015) was a Canadian professional ice hockey player who played three games in the National Hockey League (NHL) for the Minnesota North Stars during the 1981–82 season The rest of his career, which lasted from 1977 to 1990, was spent in the minor leagues and then in the Swiss Nationalliga A. After his playing career Poulin worked as a coach in Switzerland for several years, primarily with HC Moutier.

As a youth, he played in the 1970 Quebec International Pee-Wee Hockey Tournament with a minor ice hockey team from Thetford Mines. He died of skin cancer in 2015.

== Career statistics ==
=== Regular season and playoffs ===
			Regular season					Playoffs
Season	Team	League	GP	G	A	Pts	PIM	GP	G	A	Pts	PIM
1973–74	Kenora Muskies	MJHL	3	0	0	0	4	—	—	—	—	—
1973–74	Chicoutimi Sagueneens	QMJHL	70	4	25	29	31	—	—	—	—	—
1974–75	Chicoutimi Sagueneens	QMJHL	68	15	46	61	43	9	2	6	8	2
1975–76	Chicoutimi Sagueneens	QMJHL	72	18	55	73	24	5	1	4	5	4
1976–77	Chicoutimi Sagueneens	QMJHL	72	21	74	95	50	8	3	8	11	19
1977–78	Kalamazoo Wings	IHL	43	7	20	27	44	—	—	—	—	—
1977–78	Muskegon Mohawks	IHL	2	0	1	1	0	—	—	—	—	—
1978–79	Erie Blades	EHL	68	35	53	88	79	—	—	—	—	—
1979–80	Erie Blades	EHL	65	33	66	99	36	9	3	12	15	12
1980–81	Oklahoma City Stars	CHL	58	16	32	48	32	3	0	0	)	0
1981–82	Minnesota North Stars	NHL	3	1	1	2	2	—	—	—	—	—
1981–82	Nashville South Stars	CHL	76	29	56	85	104	3	2	2	4	2
1982–83	EHC Biel	NLA	38	32	27	59	—	—	—	—	—	—
1983–84	EHC Biel	NLA	40	30	34	64	—	—	—	—	—	—
1984–85	EHC Biel	NLA	38	25	28	53	—	—	—	—	—	—
1985–86	EHC Biel	NLA	35	26	33	59	78	—	—	—	—	—
1986–87	EHC Biel	NLA	24	14	21	35	44	—	—	—	—	—
1987–88	EHC Biel	NLA	36	18	25	43	83	—	—	—	—	—
1988–89	EHC Biel	NLA	36	17	24	41	52	2	1	0	1	5
1989–90	HC Davos	NLB	31	17	16	33	63	—	—	—	—	—
NLA totals			247	162	192	354	257	2	1	0	1	5
NHL totals			3	1	1	2	2	—	—	—	—	—
