= Peter Jaks =

Swiss ice hockey player

- Born: 4 May 1966 Frýdek-Místek, Czechoslovakia
- Died: 5 October 2011 (aged 45) Bari, Italy
- Height: 6 ft 0 in (183 cm)
- Weight: 231 lb (105 kg; 16 st 7 lb)
- Position: Right wing
- Shot: Left
- Played for: ZSC Lions; HC Lugano; HC Ambrì-Piotta
- National team: Switzerland
- Playing career: 1983–2003

Peter Jaks (4 May 1966 – 5 October 2011) was a Swiss ice hockey player. He competed at the 1988 and 1992 Winter Olympics. He took his own life on 5 October 2011 by standing in front of a train in Bari, Italy.

== Career statistics ==
=== Regular season and playoffs ===
			Regular season					Playoffs
Season	Team	League	GP	G	A	Pts	PIM	GP	G	A	Pts	PIM
1982–83	HC Ascona	SUI–3	—	—	—	—	—	—	—	—	—	—
1983–84	HC Ambrì–Piotta	SUI U20	—	—	—	—	—	—	—	—	—	—
1983–84	HC Ambrì–Piotta	SUI–2	—	—	—	—	—	—	—	—	—	—
1984–85	HC Ambrì–Piotta	SUI U20	—	—	—	—	—	—	—	—	—	—
1984–85	HC Ambrì–Piotta	SUI–2	40	32	17	49	—	—	—	—	—	—
1985–86	HC Ambrì–Piotta	SUI U20	—	—	—	—	—	—	—	—	—	—
1985–86	HC Ambrì–Piotta	NDA	36	21	13	34	8	—	—	—	—	—
1986–87	HC Ambrì–Piotta	NDA	36	39	23	62	23	5	2	2	4	2
1987–88	HC Lugano	NDA	36	38	21	59	22	4	1	1	2	0
1988–89	HC Lugano	NDA	36	28	11	39	20	10	7	2	9	11
1989–90	HC Ambrì–Piotta	NDA	36	29	22	51	20	2	0	1	1	14
1990–91	HC Ambrì–Piotta	NDA	36	36	35	71	59	4	2	5	7	9
1991–92	HC Ambrì–Piotta	NDA	36	22	23	45	42	10	8	5	13	4
1992–93	HC Ambrì–Piotta	NDA	26	12	4	16	51	9	3	3	6	4
1993–94	HC Ambrì–Piotta	NDA	36	24	18	42	16	2	1	2	3	0
1994–95	HC Ambrì–Piotta	NDA	32	21	18	39	26	3	0	0	0	2
1995–96	HC Ambrì–Piotta	NDA	36	24	22	46	22	7	4	4	8	29
1996–97	HC Ambrì–Piotta	NDA	43	24	30	54	20	—	—	—	—	—
1997–98	HC Ambrì–Piotta	NDA	37	28	15	43	22	14	4	9	13	39
1998–99	ZSC Lions	NDA	40	25	26	51	20	7	4	3	7	4
1999–2000	ZSC Lions	NLA	45	16	21	37	38	14	5	4	9	14
2000–01	ZSC Lions	NLA	41	14	15	29	16	16	2	10	12	12
2001–02	ZSC Lions	NLA	44	21	17	38	53	17	6	7	13	10
2002–03	ZSC Lions	NLA	42	14	14	28	39	11	3	1	4	4
NDA/NLA totals			674	435	348	783	517	135	52	59	111	158

=== International ===
Year	Team	Event	GP	G	A	Pts	PIM
1985	Switzerland	WJC B	7	11	8	19	—
1986	Switzerland	WJC	7	6	2	8	2
1987	Switzerland	WC	10	3	4	7	6
1988	Switzerland	OG	6	2	3	5	4
1989	Switzerland	WC B	7	2	2	4	6
1990	Switzerland	WC B	7	2	0	2	0
1991	Switzerland	WC	10	0	2	2	4
1992	Switzerland	OG	7	1	0	1	0
1996	Switzerland	WC B	7	4	6	10	2
1997	Switzerland	OGQ	4	0	1	1	0
1998	Switzerland	WC	9	2	0	2	0
Senior totals			67	16	18	34	22
