= Thomas Vrabec =

Swiss ice hockey player

- Born: October 22, 1966 (age 58); Jablonec nad Nisou, Czechoslovakia
- Height: 6 ft 0 in (183 cm)
- Weight: 212 lb (96 kg; 15 st 2 lb)
- Position: Centre
- Shot: Right
- Played for: SC Bern (NLA); HC Lugano (NLA); EHC Chur
- National team: Switzerland
- Playing career: 1985–1996

Thomas Vrabec (born October 22, 1966) is a retired Swiss professional ice hockey centre of Czech ancestry. He was born in Jablonec nad Nisou. In 1996 he had to abandon his career due to thrombosis. He was team captain of the SC Bern and the Swiss national team.

== Career statistics ==
			Regular season					Playoffs
Season	Team	League	GP	G	A	Pts	PIM	GP	G	A	Pts	PIM
1982–83	SC Luzern	SwissDiv1	—	—	—	—	—	—	—	—	—	—
1983–84	EHC Chur	NLB	—	—	—	—	—	—	—	—	—	—
1984–85	EHC Chur	NLA	37	13	—	—	—	—	—	—	—	—
1985–86	EHC Chur	NLB	33	31	18	49	40	5	3	0	3	2
1986–87	EHC Chur	NLA	36	18	13	31	28	—	—	—	—	—
1987–88	HC Lugano	NLA	36	24	20	44	20	7	2	5	7	14
1988–89	HC Lugano	NLA	34	25	15	40	18	10	8	3	11	7
1989–90	HC Lugano	NLA	36	30	15	45	43	1	0	0	0	0
1990–91	SC Bern	NLA	34	21	19	40	20	10	3	4	7	6
1991–92	SC Bern	NLA	32	14	9	23	14	—	—	—	—	—
1992–93	SC Bern	NLA	34	20	16	36	24	5	5	2	7	8
1993–94	SC Bern	NLA	22	17	14	31	18	5	7	4	11	2
1994–95	SC Bern	NLA	36	21	25	46	61	6	2	0	2	2
1995–96	SC Bern	NLA	34	15	25	40	30	—	—	—	—	—
NLA totals			371	218	171	376	276	44	27	18	45	39

== Achievements ==
- 1987 - NLA Champion with HC Lugano
- 1988 - NLA Champion with HC Lugano
- 1990 - NLA Champion with HC Lugano
- 1991 - NLA Champion with SC Bern
- 1992 - NLA Champion with SC Bern

== International play ==
Thomas Vrabec participated in the following tournaments for the Swiss national team:

- 2 A-World Championships: 1991, 1993
- 2 B-World Championships: 1989, 1990
- 2 Olympic Games: 1988 in Calgary and 1992 in Albertville
