= Doug Honegger =

Swiss ice hockey player

- Born: February 24, 1968 (age 57); Montreal, Quebec, Canada
- Height: 6 ft 0 in (183 cm)
- Weight: 180 lb (82 kg; 12 st 12 lb)
- Position: Defence
- Shot: Left
- Played for: HC Ambrì-Piotta; HC Sierre-Anniviers; HC Lugano; HC Fribourg-Gottéron; HC Davos
- National team: Switzerland
- Playing career: 1986–1996

Doug Honegger (born February 24, 1968) is a Canadian-born Swiss former professional ice hockey defenceman.

Born in Montreal, Quebec, Honegger played his entire professional career in Switzerland's Nationalliga A. He played for HC Ambrì-Piotta, HC Sierre-Anniviers, HC Lugano, HC Fribourg-Gottéron and HC Davos.

Honegger participated as a member of the Swiss national team at the 1992 Winter Olympics.

== Hockey career ==
After playing for the Hull Olympiques (now known as the Gatineau Olympiques) in the QMJHL as a rookie in 1985-86 and being selected to the all-rookie team, Honegger left as an 18-year-old to play professionally in Switzerland. During his career, he played for HC Ambrì-Piotta, HC Sierre-Anniviers, HC Lugano, HC Fribourg-Gottéron and HC Davos. Upon receiving official approval from the International Ice Hockey Federation to join the Swiss national team in 1991, was selected for the World Championships in 1991, 1992 & 1994 and though selected to the team, missed out due to injury in 1993 & 1995. This culminated with the 1992 Olympics in Albertville.

After suffering a severe knee injury, Honegger retired in 1996.

== Career statistics ==
| | | | Regular season | | | | | Playoffs |
| Season | Team | League | GP | G | A | Pts | PIM | GP | G | A | Pts | PIM |
|---|---|---|---|---|---|---|---|---|---|---|---|---|
| 1983–84 | Lac-St-Louis Lions | QMAAA | 1 | 0 | 0 | 0 | 0 | 2 | 0 | 0 | 0 | — |
| 1984–85 | Lac-St-Louis Lions | QMAAA | 40 | 17 | 35 | 52 | 101 | 11 | 3 | 12 | 15 | — |
| 1985–86 | Hull Olympiques | QMJHL | 71 | 4 | 33 | 37 | 107 | 15 | 3 | 9 | 12 | 2 |
| 1986–87 | HC Ambrì-Piotta | NLA | 28 | 2 | 4 | 6 | 42 | — | — | — | — | — |
| 1987–88 | HC Ambrì-Piotta | NLA | 31 | 2 | 11 | 13 | 32 | 6 | 1 | 3 | 4 | 6 |
| 1988–89 | HC Ambrì-Piotta | NLA | 36 | 3 | 4 | 7 | 52 | 6 | 0 | 0 | 0 | 9 |
| 1989–90 | HC Ambrì-Piotta | NLA | 14 | 0 | 2 | 2 | 8 | — | — | — | — | — |
| 1990–91 | Genève-Servette HC | NLB | — | — | — | — | — | — | — | — | — | — |
| 1990–91 | HC Sierre | NLA | 30 | 9 | 11 | 20 | 53 | — | — | — | — | — |
| 1991–92 | HC Lugano | NLA | 32 | 4 | 10 | 14 | 55 | 4 | 0 | 2 | 2 | 9 |
| 1992–93 | HC Lugano | NLA | 36 | 2 | 8 | 10 | 71 | 8 | 0 | 3 | 3 | 10 |
| 1993–94 | HC Fribourg-Gottéron | NLA | 34 | 7 | 16 | 23 | 28 | 11 | 1 | 3 | 4 | 16 |
| 1994–95 | HC Fribourg-Gottéron | NLA | 33 | 4 | 10 | 14 | 54 | 6 | 0 | 4 | 4 | 0 |
| 1995–96 | HC Davos | NLA | 34 | 2 | 13 | 15 | 36 | 5 | 0 | 1 | 1 | 0 |
| NLA totals | | | 308 | 35 | 89 | 124 | 431 | 56 | 5 | 20 | 25 | 71 |

== Post-playing career ==
After his retirement, Honegger made a name for himself as a leading player agent, eventually selling his firm in 2006. He has since become a successful entrepreneur, investing in and operating several ventures in sports, entertainment, and media.

Since 2006, Honegger has been the North American sports expert for Blick and Blick.ch, the leading Swiss daily and portal.

== Personal life ==
Honegger is the grandnephew of Swiss composer Arthur Honegger.
