= Mike Kaszycki =

Canadian ice hockey player

- Born: February 27, 1956 (age 70) Milton, Ontario, Canada
- Height: 5 ft 9 in (175 cm)
- Weight: 185 lb (84 kg; 13 st 3 lb)
- Position: Centre
- Shot: Left
- Played for: New York Islanders; Washington Capitals; Toronto Maple Leafs; HC Langnau; HC Ambrì-Piotta; EV Zug; Genève-Servette HC; Lausanne HC
- NHL draft: 32nd overall, 1976; New York Islanders
- WHA draft: 38th overall, 1976; New England Whalers
- Playing career: 1976–1989

Michael John Kaszycki (born February 27, 1956) is a Canadian former professional ice hockey player.

== Biography ==
As a youth, Kaszycki played in the 1968 and 1969 Quebec International Pee-Wee Hockey Tournaments with the Toronto Christie minor ice hockey team.

He played major junior hockey with the Sault Ste. Marie Greyhounds, of the Ontario Major Junior Hockey League (today's OHL), winning the Eddie Powers Memorial Trophy as the league's scoring champion in his final junior season of 1975–76.

Kaszycki was drafted by the New York Islanders 32nd overall in the 1976 NHL Amateur Draft and by the New England Whalers 38th overall in the 1976 WHA Amateur Draft. He signed with the Islanders, playing with them, the Washington Capitals and the Toronto Maple Leafs. Kaszycki played 226 games over five seasons in the NHL, scoring 122 points.

During the 1981–82 AHL season, while playing for the New Brunswick Hawks, Kaszycki won three individual American Hockey League awards. Kaszycki was awarded the Les Cunningham Award as Most Valuable Player, the John B. Sollenberger Trophy as top scorer, and the Fred T. Hunt Memorial Award for sportsmanship and perseverance.

== Career statistics ==
			Regular season					Playoffs
Season	Team	League	GP	G	A	Pts	PIM	GP	G	A	Pts	PIM
1972–73	Dixie Beehives	OPJHL	44	35	54	89	33	—	—	—	—	—
1973–74	Dixie Beehives	OPJHL	43	44	55	99	34	—	—	—	—	—
1974–75	Toronto Marlboros	OMJHL	70	41	44	85	48	23	11	15	26	21
1974–75	Toronto Marlboros	MC	—	—	—	—	—	4	2	0	2	0
1975–76	Sault Ste. Marie Greyhounds	OMJHL	66	51	119	170	38	12	10	10	20	8
1976–77	Fort Worth Texans	CHL	76	32	55	87	50	6	3	3	6	10
1977–78	New York Islanders	NHL	58	13	29	42	24	7	1	3	4	4
1977–78	Rochester Americans	AHL	6	4	2	6	2	—	—	—	—	—
1978–79	New York Islanders	NHL	71	16	18	34	37	10	1	3	4	4
1979–80	New York Islanders	NHL	16	1	4	5	15	—	—	—	—	—
1979–80	Washington Capitals	NHL	28	7	10	17	10	—	—	—	—	—
1979–80	Toronto Maple Leafs	NHL	25	4	4	8	10	2	0	0	0	2
1980–81	Toronto Maple Leafs	NHL	6	0	2	2	2	—	—	—	—	—
1980–81	Dallas Black Hawks	CHL	42	15	21	36	42	6	2	2	4	9
1981–82	New Brunswick Hawks	AHL	80	36	82	118	67	15	8	13	21	17
1982–83	Toronto Maple Leafs	NHL	22	1	13	14	10	—	—	—	—	—
1982–83	St. Catharines Saints	AHL	56	26	42	68	30	—	—	—	—	—
1983–84	St. Catharines Saints	AHL	72	39	71	110	51	5	1	1	2	7
1984–85	HC Langnau	NDA	22	12	13	25	—	—	—	—	—	—
1984–85	Moncton Golden Flames	AHL	30	9	15	24	8	—	—	—	—	—
1985–86	HC Ambrì–Piotta	NDA	36	19	18	37	61	—	—	—	—	—
1986–87	HC Ambrì–Piotta	NDA	33	23	27	50	52	5	1	3	4	10
1987–88	HC Ambrì–Piotta	NDA	35	19	20	39	59	6	2	4	6	20
1988–89	EV Zug	NDA	35	25	23	48	68	3	1	1	2	0
1989–90	Genève–Servette HC	SUI.3	—	—	—	—	—	—	—	—	—	—
1990–91	Lausanne HC	SUI.2	36	21	33	54	113	1	0	2	2	14
1991–92	Lausanne HC	SUI.2	27	16	27	43	55	—	—	—	—	—
NHL totals			226	42	80	122	108	19	2	6	8	10
AHL totals			244	114	212	326	158	20	9	14	23	24
NDA totals			159	98	101	199	—	14	4	8	12	30
