= Bob Mongrain =

Canadian ice hockey player

- Born: August 31, 1959 (age 66) La Sarre, Quebec, Canada
- Height: 5 ft 10 in (178 cm)
- Weight: 165 lb (75 kg; 11 st 11 lb)
- Position: Centre
- Shot: Left
- Played for: Buffalo Sabres; Los Angeles Kings; EHC Kloten
- NHL draft: Undrafted
- Playing career: 1979–1994

Robert Julien Mongrain (born August 31, 1959) is a Canadian former professional ice hockey centre. He played in the National Hockey League with the Buffalo Sabres and Los Angeles Kings between 1979 and 1986. The rest of his career, which lasted from 1979 to 1994, was spent in the minor leagues and then in the Swiss Nationalliga A. After his playing career, Mongrain became a coach in the Quebec Major Junior Hockey League, Canadian university leagues, and in Switzerland.

In his NHL career, Mongrain appeared in 81 games. He scored thirteen goals and added fourteen assists.

== Career statistics ==
=== Regular season and playoffs ===
			Regular season					Playoffs
Season	Team	League	GP	G	A	Pts	PIM	GP	G	A	Pts	PIM
1975–76	Cap-de-la-Madeleine Barons	QJAHL	—	—	—	—	—	—	—	—	—	—
1975–76	Trois-Rivieres Draveurs	QMJHL	1	0	0	0	0	—	—	—	—	—
1976–77	Cap-de-la-Madeleine Barons	QJAHL	60	53	79	132	—	—	—	—	—	—
1976–77	Trois-Rivieres Draveurs	QMJHL	12	0	2	2	0	—	—	—	—	—
1977–78	Trois-Rivieres Draveurs	QMJHL	72	35	43	78	77	13	2	4	6	7
1977–78	Trois-Rivieres Draveurs	M-Cup	—	—	—	—	—	4	1	2	3	0
1978–79	Trois-Rivieres Draveurs	QMJHL	72	66	76	142	55	13	4	14	18	13
1978–79	Trois-Rivieres Draveurs	M-Cup	—	—	—	—	—	4	3	0	3	2
1979–80	Rochester Americans	AHL	39	25	24	49	58	—	—	—	—	—
1979–80	Buffalo Sabres	NHL	34	4	6	10	4	9	1	2	3	2
1980–81	Rochester Americans	AHL	69	21	29	50	101	—	—	—	—	—
1980–81	Buffalo Sabres	NHL	4	0	0	0	2	—	—	—	—	—
1981–82	Rochester Americans	AHL	56	37	37	74	45	—	—	—	—	—
1981–82	Buffalo Sabres	NHL	24	6	4	10	6	1	0	0	0	0
1982–83	Rochester Americans	AHL	80	29	52	81	72	—	—	—	—	—
1983–84	Rochester Americans	AHL	78	41	44	85	154	—	—	—	—	—
1984–85	EHC Kloten	NLA	36	42	26	68	—	—	—	—	—	—
1984–85	Buffalo Sabres	NHL	8	1	1	2	0	—	—	—	—	—
1985–86	EHC Kloten	NLA	34	44	33	77	109	5	8	1	9	21
1985–86	Los Angeles Kings	NHL	11	2	3	5	2	—	—	—	—	—
1986–87	EHC Kloten	NLA	29	25	22	47	44	—	—	—	—	—
1987–88	EHC Kloten	NLA	35	29	18	47	79	7	8	4	12	8
1988–89	HC Martigny	NLB	36	36	32	68	144	10	6	4	10	27
1989–90	HC Sierre	NLB	35	26	39	65	91	10	8	7	15	26
1990–91	HC Sierre	NLA	29	19	22	41	56	—	—	—	—	—
1991–92	HC Martigny	NLB	16	11	17	28	18	8	3	9	12	20
1992–93	HC Martigny	NLB	34	27	23	50	58	5	1	2	3	26
1993–94	HC Martigny	NLB	1	0	0	0	0	—	—	—	—	—
NLA totals			163	159	121	280	288	22	27	16	43	51
NHL totals			81	13	14	27	14	10	1	2	3	2
