= Norm Dupont =

Canadian ice hockey player (born 1957)

- Born: February 5, 1957 (age 69) Montreal, Quebec, Canada
- Height: 5 ft 10 in (178 cm)
- Weight: 185 lb (84 kg; 13 st 3 lb)
- Position: Left wing
- Shot: Left
- Played for: Montreal Canadiens; Winnipeg Jets; Hartford Whalers
- NHL draft: 18th overall, 1977; Montreal Canadiens
- WHA draft: 31st overall, 1977; Birmingham Bulls
- Playing career: 1977–1984

Normand Joseph Gilles Dupont (born February 5, 1957) is a Canadian former professional ice hockey forward.

As a youth, he played in the 1970 Quebec International Pee-Wee Hockey Tournament with a minor ice hockey team from Montréal-Nord.

Dupont started his National Hockey League career with the Montreal Canadiens in 1979. He also played for the Winnipeg Jets and Hartford Whalers. He left the NHL after the 1984 season. He played eight seasons in the Swiss National League A before retiring from hockey.

== Career statistics ==
			Regular season					Playoffs
Season	Team	League	GP	G	A	Pts	PIM	GP	G	A	Pts	PIM
1973–74	Montreal Bleu Blanc Rouge	QMJHL	70	55	70	125	4	9	3	8	11	0
1974–75	Montreal Bleu Blanc Rouge	QMJHL	72	84	74	158	45	9	3	8	11	9
1975–76	Montreal Juniors	QMJHL	70	69	63	132	6	6	7	3	10	0
1976–77	Montreal Juniors	QMJHL	71	70	83	153	52	13	9	10	19	9
1977–78	Nova Scotia Voyageurs	AHL	81	31	29	60	21	—	—	—	—	—
1978–79	Nova Scotia Voyageurs	AHL	48	27	31	58	10	10	7	4	11	2
1979–80	Montreal Canadiens	NHL	35	1	3	4	4	—	—	—	—	—
1980–81	Winnipeg Jets	NHL	80	27	26	53	8	—	—	—	—	—
1981–82	Winnipeg Jets	NHL	62	13	25	38	22	4	2	0	2	0
1982–83	Winnipeg Jets	NHL	39	7	16	23	6	1	1	1	2	0
1982–83	Sherbrooke Jets	AHL	3	2	1	3	2	—	—	—	—	—
1983–84	Hartford Whalers	NHL	40	7	15	22	12	—	—	—	—	—
1983–84	Binghamton Whalers	AHL	27	15	24	39	6	—	—	—	—	—
1984–85	EHC Biel	NDA	38	40	26	66	—	—	—	—	—	—
1985–86	EHC Biel	NDA	36	44	45	89	57	—	—	—	—	—
1986–87	EHC Biel	NDA	35	30	42	72	51	—	—	—	—	—
1987–88	EHC Biel	NDA	34	50	39	89	68	—	—	—	—	—
1988–89	EHC Biel	NDA	36	36	35	71	63	2	0	0	0	2
1989–90	EHC Biel	NDA	36	42	34	76	44	6	3	4	7	4
1990–91	EHC Biel	NDA	36	22	27	49	20	3	1	1	2	0
1991–92	HC Ajoie	CHE II	36	44	48	92	48	10	15	9	24	8
1992–93	HC Ajoie	NDA	25	15	18	33	20	—	—	—	—	—
AHL totals			159	75	85	160	39	10	7	4	11	2
NHL totals			256	55	85	140	52	5	3	1	4	0
NDA totals			276	279	266	545	323	11	4	5	9	6

Preceded by Mark Napier	Montreal Canadiens first-round draft pick 1977	Succeeded by Dan Geoffrion
