= Patrick Howald =

Swiss ice hockey player

- Born: December 26, 1969 (age 56) Bern, Switzerland
- Height: 6 ft 0 in (183 cm)
- Weight: 198 lb (90 kg; 14 st 2 lb)
- Position: Left wing
- Shot: Left
- Played for: SC Bern; HC Lugano; HC Fribourg-Gottéron
- National team: Switzerland
- NHL draft: 276th overall, 1993; Los Angeles Kings
- Playing career: 1987–2005

Patrick Howald (born December 26, 1969) is a Swiss former professional ice hockey winger.

== Career ==
Howald played in the Nationalliga A for SC Bern, HC Lugano and HC Fribourg-Gottéron. He won four National League A Championships with SC Bern and the number 22 jersey was retired by the team in his honour. He was drafted 276th overall by the Los Angeles Kings in the 1987 NHL entry draft but remained in Switzerland throughout his career and never played in North America. Howald was also a member of the Switzerland national ice hockey team and played in the 1992 Winter Olympics in Albertville, France.

== Career statistics ==
			Regular season					Playoffs
Season	Team	League	GP	G	A	Pts	PIM	GP	G	A	Pts	PIM
1986–87	SC Bern	NLA	5	2	0	2	0	—	—	—	—	—
1987–88	SC Bern	NLA	31	1	2	3	6	—	—	—	—	—
1988–89	SC Bern	NLA	36	10	9	19	8	11	2	2	4	8
1989–90	SC Bern	NLA	36	17	18	35	36	11	6	2	8	10
1990–91	SC Bern	NLA	36	18	16	34	55	10	7	7	14	12
1991–92	SC Bern	NLA	36	20	11	31	30	11	7	6	13	8
1992–93	HC Lugano	NLA	36	15	9	24	50	9	5	1	6	10
1993–94	HC Lugano	NLA	36	12	15	27	26	6	2	0	2	2
1994–95	SC Bern	NLA	36	14	15	29	26	9	1	2	3	2
1995–96	SC Bern	NLA	35	21	7	28	14	11	6	11	17	0
1996–97	SC Bern	NLA	46	26	20	46	71	3	0	0	0	2
1997–98	SC Bern	NLA	36	13	14	27	34	7	1	1	2	4
1998–99	SC Bern	NLA	45	21	15	36	50	6	1	1	2	4
1999–00	SC Bern	NLA	43	15	15	30	26	5	0	0	0	6
2000–01	SC Bern	NLA	43	10	5	15	46	10	1	1	2	2
2001–02	HC Fribourg-Gottéron	NLA	44	14	19	33	48	5	0	1	1	0
2002–03	HC Fribourg-Gottéron	NLA	44	13	17	30	41	—	—	—	—	—
2003–04	HC Fribourg-Gottéron	NLA	48	15	21	36	12	4	1	0	1	4
2004–05	HC Fribourg-Gottéron	NLA	44	4	6	10	24	11	4	4	8	8
NLA totals			716	261	234	495	603	129	44	39	83	82

== Achievements ==
- 1989 - NLA Champion with SC Bern
- 1991 - NLA Champion with SC Bern
- 1992 - NLA Champion with SC Bern
- 1997 - NLA Champion with SC Bern

His jersey number #22 was retired by his club on Dec 1, 2009.

== International play ==
Patrick Howald played a total of 119 games for the Swiss national team.

He participated in the following tournaments:

- 4 A-World Championships: 1991, 1992, 1993, 1995
- 2 B-World Championships: 1990, 1994
- 1 Olympic Games: 1992 in Albertville
