= Ron Wilson (ice hockey, born 1955) =

Canadian-American ice hockey coach

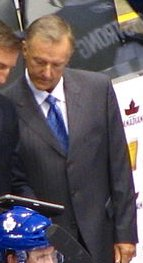
- Wilson in 2010
- Born: May 28, 1955 (age 71) Windsor, Ontario, Canada
- Height: 5 ft 11 in (180 cm)
- Weight: 175 lb (79 kg; 12 st 7 lb)
- Position: Defence
- Shot: Right
- Played for: Toronto Maple Leafs; Minnesota North Stars
- Coached for: Mighty Ducks of Anaheim; Washington Capitals; San Jose Sharks; Toronto Maple Leafs
- National team: United States
- NHL draft: 132nd overall, 1975; Toronto Maple Leafs
- WHA draft: 176th overall, 1974; Houston Aeros
- Playing career: 1977–1988
- Coaching career: 1988–2012
Medal record
Head coach for the United States
World Cup of Hockey
Gold medal – first place	1996 North America	Team
Winter Olympics
Silver medal – second place	2010 Vancouver	Team

Ronald Lawrence Wilson (born May 28, 1955) is a Canadian-American former professional ice hockey player and head coach. He was selected in the eighth round, 132nd overall, by the Toronto Maple Leafs in the 1975 NHL entry draft. He served as a coach for the Mighty Ducks of Anaheim, Washington Capitals, San Jose Sharks, and Toronto Maple Leafs of the National Hockey League (NHL). He was also the head coach of the United States men's national ice hockey team for the 1996 World Cup of Hockey along with the 1998 and 2010 Winter Olympics; he won the World Cup in 1996 and won the silver medal in 2010. Wilson holds dual citizenship of Canada and the United States.

== Personal life ==
Wilson was born in Windsor, Ontario, and raised in Fort Erie, Ontario. He moved from Fort Erie to Riverside, Rhode Island, when he was 12 years old. As a result, Wilson holds dual citizenship of Canada and the United States, and has represented Team USA in both playing and coaching.

Both his father, Larry Wilson, and his uncle, Johnny Wilson, played for the Detroit Red Wings in the 1950s and later coached in the NHL.

Wilson and his wife Maureen have two daughters together.

In December 2016, Wilson suffered a stroke and underwent rehabilitation.

== Playing career ==
=== Collegiate ===
Wilson began playing with Providence College in 1973–74, where he led the Friars in scoring in his rookie season with 16 goals and 38 points in 26 games, helping the Friars reach the ECAC quarter-finals, where they were defeated by the Harvard Crimson, 9–3.

In the 1974–75 season, Wilson broke out offensively, scoring 26 goals and 87 points in 27 games, helping the Friars into the ECAC tournament for the second consecutive season. In the tournament, the Friars would lose in the quarter-finals to the Vermont Catamounts, 7–5.

Wilson had another solid season with the Friars in 1975–76, scoring 19 goals and 66 points in 28 games, though the team struggled and failed to ultimately qualify for the tournament.

In his final season at Providence, in 1976–77, Wilson's offense declined, though he still put up solid numbers, scoring 17 goals and 59 points in 30 games to lead the team in scoring. Providence qualified for the tournament as the eighth seed, but lost to Clarkson 6–3 in the quarter-finals.

=== Professional career ===
Wilson was drafted by the Toronto Maple Leafs in the eighth round, 132nd overall, at the 1975 NHL entry draft. He was also drafted by the Houston Aeros in the 1974 WHA Amateur Draft, but opted to sign instead with the Maple Leafs and pursue an NHL career.

Wilson saw his first professional action in the 1976–77 season after his college hockey career was over, where he appeared in four games with the Dallas Black Hawks of the Central Hockey League (CHL), scoring a goal.

Wilson began the 1977–78 season with the Black Hawks, where in 67 games, he scored 31 goals and 69 points to lead the team in scoring. He earned a late-season promotion to the NHL and played in 13 games with the Maple Leafs, scoring two goals and three points. Wilson did not see any playing time in the post-season, however, as the Maple Leafs lost to the Montreal Canadiens in the third round of the playoffs.

He split the 1978–79 season between the New Brunswick Hawks of the American Hockey League (AHL), as in 31 games, Wilson had 11 goals and 32 points, and the Maple Leafs. In Toronto, Wilson played in 46 games, scoring five goals and 17 points. He appeared in three playoff games for Toronto, earning an assist, as the Leafs lost to the Montreal Canadiens in the quarter-finals.

Wilson spent the majority of the 1979–80 season in New Brunswick, where in 43 games, he scored 20 goals and 63 points to finish fourth in team scoring. He appeared in only five games with the Maple Leafs, earning two assists. Wilson skated for the Leafs in the post-season, where he scored a goal and three points in three games as Toronto was swept by the Minnesota North Stars in the first round. He returned to the Hawks for the Calder Cup playoffs, and in 14 games, Wilson had three goals and five points, as New Brunswick lost to the Hershey Bears in the final round.

Wilson signed with EHC Kloten of NDA in Switzerland for 1980–81, where in 38 games, Wilson scored 22 goals and 45 points.

After only one season with Kloten, Wilson signed with HC Davos for the 1981–82 season. In 38 games, Wilson scored 24 goals and 47 points, helping the team finish in second place.

In 1982–83, Wilson improved his offense to 32 goals and 64 points in 36 games, as Davos finished the first round of the season with a League-best 20–0–8 record, before slumping to a 3–2–5 record in the final round to finish the season in third place.

Wilson saw more improvement with his offense in 1983–84, scoring 33 goals and 72 points in 36 games, helping Davos win the championship.

In 38 games in the 1984–85, Wilson scored 39 goals and 101 points, leading the club to their second-straight Swiss championship.

Following his season with Davos, Wilson returned to the NHL and signed with the Minnesota North Stars for the remainder of the 1984–85 season. In 13 games, Wilson had four goals and 12 points, helping the club secure the fourth and final playoff position in the Norris Division. In nine playoff games, Wilson had a goal and seven points, as Minnesota swept the first place St. Louis Blues before losing to the Chicago Black Hawks in the division finals.

Wilson returned to HC Davos in Switzerland for the 1985–86 season after his late-season stint with the North Stars in 1984–85. In 27 games, Wilson scored 28 goals and 69 points, helping the club into the post-season. In five playoff games, Wilson had six goals and eight points, however, HC Davos lost to HC Lugano in the final round.

For the second consecutive season, Wilson joined the North Stars after his season with HC Davos, and finished 1985–86 with Minnesota, scoring a goal and four points in 11 games, helping the club finish in second place in the Norris Division. In the 1986 playoffs, Wilson had two goals and six points in five games, as Minnesota lost to the St. Louis Blues in the division semi-finals.

Wilson remained with the North Stars in 1986–87, as in a career-high 65 games, he had 12 goals and 41 points to finish second among North Stars defensemen in team scoring, however, the club struggled and failed to qualify for the post-season.

Wilson began the 1987–88 season with the North Stars, where in 24 games, he scored two goals and 14 points. He played in his last NHL game on December 16, 1987, earning an assist in a 4–2 loss to the Chicago Blackhawks. Shortly after the game, the North Stars released Wilson.

Following his release from Minnesota, Wilson rejoined HC Davos to finish the 1987–88 season in Switzerland. In 36 games, Wilson had eight goals and 32 points and in six playoff games, he had two goals and seven points, as HC Davos finished in fourth place.

After the season, Wilson announced his retirement as a player.

== Coaching career ==
=== Milwaukee Admirals (1989–1990) ===
Wilson joined the Milwaukee Admirals of the International Hockey League (IHL) as an assistant coach, working under Head Coach Ron Lapointe. In his only season with the Admirals, the club finished with a 36–39–7 record, finishing in third place in the West Division. In the playoffs, the Admirals lost to the Salt Lake Golden Eagles in the first round.

=== Vancouver Canucks (1990–1993) ===
Wilson joined the Vancouver Canucks coaching staff as an assistant coach under Bob McCammon in the 1990–91 season. After the Canucks struggled to a 19–30–5 record, the club fired McCammon and replaced him with Pat Quinn. Wilson remained as an assistant, and under Quinn, the Canucks went 9–13–4 to sneak into the fourth and final playoff spot in the Smythe Division. In the 1991 post-season, the Canucks lost to the Los Angeles Kings in six games in the first round.

In 1991–92, Vancouver improved their point total by 31 points, as the team finished the year with a 42–26–12 record, finishing in first place in the Smythe Division. The heavily favoured Canucks managed to defeat the Winnipeg Jets in seven games before falling to the Edmonton Oilers in six games in the Smythe Division Finals.

Vancouver improved their point total once again in 1992–93, going 46–29–9, earning 101 points and their second consecutive Smythe Division title. In the 1993 playoffs, the Canucks defeated the Winnipeg Jets in the first round before losing to the Los Angeles Kings in the division finals.

After the season, Wilson left the Canucks and became the first head coach of the expansion team Mighty Ducks of Anaheim.

=== Mighty Ducks of Anaheim (1993–1997) ===
Wilson became the first head coach of the Mighty Ducks of Anaheim for the 1993–94 season. On October 8, 1993, his first game as an NHL head coach, Wilson and the Mighty Ducks lost to the Detroit Red Wings, 7–2. He won his first game on October 13, defeating the Edmonton Oilers 4–3. The team finished the season with 33–46–5 record for 71 points, falling short of the 1993 playoffs.

The Mighty Ducks continued to struggle in the following season, 1994–95, finishing 16–27–5 in the lockout-shortened season to post the poorest record in the Western Conference.

Anaheim made a big improvement in 1995–96, however, as the club went 35–39–8 record (78 points). Nonetheless, Wilson and the Mighty Ducks' efforts came just shy of qualifying for the 1996 playoffs, finishing one spot out of post-season contention, ninth, in the Conference. Despite accumulating the same point total as the eighth-placed Winnipeg Jets, they lost the tie-breaker separating the two, as they finished with one fewer win.

The Mighty Ducks continued their improvement in 1996–97 season, finishing with their first-ever winning record, 36–33–13, and qualifying for the Stanley Cup playoffs for the first time in team history. In the post-season, Anaheim defeated the Phoenix Coyotes in seven games before being swept by the Detroit Red Wings in the second round. Despite team improvement, on May 20, 1997, the Mighty Ducks fired Wilson.

=== Washington Capitals (1997–2002) ===
On June 9, 1997, the Washington Capitals hired Wilson to become the head coach of the team, replacing Jim Schoenfeld after the club failed to reach the playoffs in 1996–97.

In his first season with the Capitals, Wilson led the team to a 40–30–12 record, a 17-point improvement over the previous season's total, as Washington qualified for the 1998 playoffs. In the post-season, the fourth-seeded Capitals defeated the Boston Bruins in the first round, then the Ottawa Senators and Buffalo Sabres to reach the 1998 Stanley Cup Finals, the first time the team reached the Finals in their 24 years of existence. In the Finals, however, the Capitals were swept in four games by the Detroit Red Wings, who won their second consecutive Stanley Cup.

Washington regressed in the subsequent 1998–99 season, going 31–45–6 record and finishing 12th in the Eastern Conference, well out of a playoff spot.

The Capitals, however, rebounded in 1999–2000, as they won the Southeast Division with a 44–24–12–2 record and finished in second place in the East. In the 2000 playoffs, the Capitals were upset by the Pittsburgh Penguins in five games in the first round.

The Capitals won their second consecutive Southeast Division title in 2000–01, going 41–27–10–4 and earning 96 points, solid enough for a third-place finish in the Eastern Conference. In the 2001 playoffs, however, the Capitals were once again upset by the Pittsburgh Penguins, who won the series in six games.

In the summer of 2001, the Capitals acquired superstar Jaromír Jágr from the Penguins and were thought to be a Stanley Cup contender for 2001–02. Despite the high-profile acquisition, the club struggled for much of the season, posting a 36–33–11–2 record and finishing in ninth place in the East, out of the 2002 playoffs. On May 10, 2002, the Capitals fired Wilson after their disappointing season.

=== San Jose Sharks (2002–2008) ===
On December 4, 2002, Wilson was hired by the San Jose Sharks, who had recently fired Darryl Sutter and had a 9–12–2–2 record at the time Wilson was hired. Under Wilson, the Sharks continued to struggle, however, going 19–25–7–6 and failing to make the 2003 playoffs.

In his first full season with San Jose, (2003–04), Wilson turned around the team, leading them to a 43–21–12–6 record for 104 points, a first-place finish in the Pacific Division and a second-place finish in the Western Conference. In the 2004 Stanley Cup playoffs, the Sharks defeated the St. Louis Blues and Colorado Avalanche to advance to the Western Conference Finals. Despite being favored to win the series, the Calgary Flames, buoyed by the play of newly acquired goaltender — and former Shark — Miikka Kiprusoff, upset San Jose in six games.

Wilson remained with the Sharks during the 2004–05 season, which was cancelled due to the 2004–05 NHL lockout.

The Sharks remained a top team in 2005–06 when play resumed, as the club went 44–27–11 for 99 points. In mid-season, the Sharks were involved in a trade that brought Joe Thornton to the club from the Boston Bruins. In the 2006 playoffs, the Sharks defeated the Nashville Predators in the first round before falling to the eighth-seeded Edmonton Oilers in the second round.

San Jose continued to improve in 2006–07, as the team won 50 games for the first time in club history, going 51–26–5 for 107 points and clinching another playoff berth. In the 2007 post-season, the Sharks defeated the Nashville Predators for the second-straight season, but lost to the Detroit Red Wings in the second round. With his team's loss to the Red Wings, Wilson became the first head coach in NHL history to lose to the same team while coaching three different teams (including Anaheim in 1997 and Washington in 1998).

The Sharks improved their point total again in 2007–08, as they went 49–23–10, earning 108 points and having the best record in the Pacific Division and claiming the second seed in the Western Conference. In the 2008 playoffs, the Sharks narrowly defeated the Calgary Flames in seven games before losing to the underdog Dallas Stars in six games in the second round. On May 12, 2008, the Sharks fired Wilson, as the club failed to meet management's playoff aspirations.

=== Toronto Maple Leafs (2008–2012) ===
On June 10, 2008, the Toronto Maple Leafs hired Wilson to become the team's head coach, replacing Paul Maurice. Upon his hiring, Toronto had not made the playoffs since 2003–04.

In Wilson's first year with the Leafs, 2008–09, the club went 34–35–13, earning 81 points for last place in the Northeast Division and 12th in the Eastern Conference.

The Maple Leafs continued to struggle in 2009–10, finishing with a 30–38–14 record, earning 74 points and a last place finish in the Eastern Conference. Before season's end, the Maple Leafs traded away their two first-round draft picks — and a second-rounder — to the Boston Bruins in exchange for Phil Kessel, also adding defenseman Dion Phaneuf from the Calgary Flames to the club midway through the season.

Toronto saw some improvement in 2010–11, as the Leafs finished with a record of 37–34–11 (85 points). Despite the improvement, the club failed to reach the 2011 playoffs, finishing in tenth place in the East.

In 2011–12, the final year of Wilson's contract, the Maple Leafs shot off to a solid start to begin the season. On December 26, 2011, the team had an 18–13–4 record and were sitting in a playoff position. Maple Leafs General Manager Brian Burke then signed Wilson to a contract extension. Shortly after the contract extension, however, the Maple Leafs began to slump, as they would go 11–15–3 in their next 29 games to fall out of playoff contention. On March 2, 2012, the Maple Leafs fired Wilson, replacing him with Randy Carlyle, who had himself just recently been fired as head coach by the Anaheim Ducks. Toronto had a 29–28–7 record at the time of Wilson's termination.

=== International career ===
Wilson first coached internationally at the 1996 IIHF World Championship in Vienna, where he guided the United States to a bronze medal, the country's first medal at the tournament in 34 years. Later that year, he was named the team's coach at the 1996 World Cup of Hockey, where he led the Americans to the tournament championship.

Following this success, Wilson again coached the Americans at the 1998 Winter Olympics in Nagano, where they went a disappointing 1–3, defeating only Belarus and being eliminated by the Czech Republic in the quarter-finals.

In April 2009, Wilson was named the head coach for the U.S. Olympic hockey team for the 2010 Winter Olympics in Vancouver. The team went undefeated through round-robin play and advanced through the knockout stages, eventually losing to the hosts Canada in the final in overtime; the team won the silver medal.

On June 4, 2015, USA Hockey announced that Wilson would be the head coach for the men's under-20 team at the 2016 World Junior Ice Hockey Championships in Helsinki, Finland.

=== Coaching style ===
As a coach, Wilson is well known for integrating technology into his coaching plans. During his stint with the Washington Capitals, he and assistant coach Tim Hunter introduced personal computers into the team's strategy planning and burned DVDs of Capitals games for the team to review. In his stint with the San Jose Sharks, Wilson introduced a tablet computer to be used in the team bench by himself or his assistants to instantly plan out strategies and review plays.

== Broadcasting career ==
In early 2015, Wilson joined the TSN Hockey panel as an analyst. He suffered a stroke in December 2016.

== Career statistics ==
=== Regular season and playoffs ===
			Regular season					Playoffs
Season	Team	League	GP	G	A	Pts	PIM	GP	G	A	Pts	PIM
1973–74	Providence College	ECAC	26	16	22	38	—	—	—	—	—	—
1974–75	Providence College	ECAC	27	26	61	87	12	—	—	—	—	—
1975–76	Providence College	ECAC	28	19	47	66	44	—	—	—	—	—
1976–77	Providence College	ECAC	30	17	42	59	62	—	—	—	—	—
1976–77	Dallas Black Hawks	CHL	4	1	0	1	2	—	—	—	—	—
1977–78	Toronto Maple Leafs	NHL	13	2	1	3	0	—	—	—	—	—
1977–78	Dallas Black Hawks	CHL	67	31	38	69	18	—	—	—	—	—
1978–79	Toronto Maple Leafs	NHL	46	5	12	17	4	3	0	1	1	0
1978–79	New Brunswick Hawks	AHL	31	11	21	32	13	—	—	—	—	—
1979–80	Toronto Maple Leafs	NHL	5	0	2	2	2	3	1	2	3	2
1979–80	New Brunswick Hawks	AHL	43	20	43	63	10	14	3	2	5	2
1980–81	EHC Kloten	NDA	38	22	23	45	—	—	—	—	—	—
1981–82	HC Davos	NDA	38	24	23	47	—	—	—	—	—	—
1982–83	HC Davos	NDA	36	32	32	64	—	—	—	—	—	—
1983–84	HC Davos	NDA	36	33	39	72	—	—	—	—	—	—
1984–85	HC Davos	NDA	38	39	62	101	—	—	—	—	—	—
1984–85	Minnesota North Stars	NHL	13	4	8	12	2	9	1	6	7	2
1985–86	HC Davos	NDA	27	28	41	69	—	5	6	2	8	—
1985–86	Minnesota North Stars	NHL	11	1	3	4	8	5	2	4	6	4
1986–87	Minnesota North Stars	NHL	65	12	29	41	36	—	—	—	—	—
1987–88	HC Davos	NDA	36	8	24	32	—	6	2	5	7	—
1987–88	Minnesota North Stars	NHL	24	2	12	14	16	—	—	—	—	—
1988–89	Zürcher SC	NDB	—	—	—	—	—	—	—	—	—	—
NHL totals			177	26	67	93	68	20	4	13	17	8
NDA totals			249	186	244	430	—	11	8	7	15	—

=== International ===
Year	Team	Event	GP	G	A	Pts	PIM
1975	United States	WC	10	1	2	3	4
1981	United States	WC	8	3	4	7	2
1987	United States	WC	10	1	3	4	12
Senior totals			28	5	9	14	18

== Coaching record ==
Team	Year	Regular season							Postseason			
Team	Year	G	W	L	T	OTL	Pts	Finish	W	L	Win %	Result
MDA	1993–94	84	33	46	5	—	71	4th in Pacific	—	—	—	Missed playoffs
MDA	1994–95	48	16	27	5	—	37	6th in Pacific	—	—	—	Missed playoffs
MDA	1995–96	82	35	39	8	—	78	4th in Pacific	—	—	—	Missed playoffs
MDA	1996–97	82	36	33	13	—	85	2nd in Pacific	4	7	.364	Lost in Conference Semifinals (DET)
MDA total		296	120	145	31	—	271	0 division titles	4	7	.364	1 playoff appearance
WSH	1997–98	82	40	30	12	—	92	3rd in Atlantic	12	9	.571	Lost in Stanley Cup Final (DET)
WSH	1998–99	82	31	45	6	—	68	4th in Southeast	—	—	—	Missed playoffs
WSH	1999–00	82	44	24	12	2	102	1st in Southeast	1	4	.200	Lost in Conference Quarterfinals (PIT)
WSH	2000–01	82	41	27	10	4	96	1st in Southeast	2	4	.333	Lost in Conference Quarterfinals (PIT)
WSH	2001–02	82	36	33	11	2	85	2nd in Southeast	—	—	—	Missed playoffs
WSH total		410	192	159	51	8	443	2 division titles	15	17	.469	3 playoff appearances
SJS	2002–03	57	19	25	7	6	73	5th in Pacific	—	—	—	Missed playoffs
SJS	2003–04	82	43	21	12	6	104	1st in Pacific	10	7	.588	Lost in Conference Finals (CGY)
SJS	2005–06	82	44	27	—	11	99	2nd in Pacific	6	5	.545	Lost in Conference Semifinals (EDM)
SJS	2006–07	82	51	26	—	5	107	2nd in Pacific	6	5	.545	Lost in Conference Semifinals (DET)
SJS	2007–08	82	49	23	—	10	108	1st in Pacific	6	7	.462	Lost in Conference Semifinals (DAL)
SJS total		385	206	122	19	48	491	2 division titles	28	24	.538	4 playoff appearances
TOR	2008–09	82	34	35	—	13	81	5th in Northeast	—	—	—	Missed playoffs
TOR	2009–10	82	30	38	—	14	74	5th in Northeast	—	—	—	Missed playoffs
TOR	2010–11	82	37	34	—	11	85	4th in Northeast	—	—	—	Missed playoffs
TOR	2011–12	64	29	28	—	7	65	(fired)	—	—	—	—
TOR total		310	130	135	—	45	305	0 division titles	—	—	—	0 playoff appearances
Total		1401	648	561	101	91	1510	4 division titles	47	48	.495	8 playoff appearances

== See also ==
- List of family relations in the National Hockey League

== Awards and honours ==
Award	Year
All-ECAC Hockey First Team	1974–75
AHCA East All-American	1974–75
All-ECAC Hockey First Team	1975–76
AHCA East All-American	1975–76
All-ECAC Hockey Second Team	1976–77
Inducted into US Hockey Hall of Fame	2017

Awards and achievements
Preceded by Vic Stanfield	ECAC Hockey Rookie of the Year; 1973–74	Succeeded by Bob Miller
Preceded by Randy Roth	ECAC Hockey Player of the Year; 1974–75	Succeeded by Peter Brown

Preceded by Position created	Head coach of the Mighty Ducks of Anaheim; 1993–97	Succeeded by Pierre Pagé
Preceded by Jim Schoenfeld	Head coach of the Washington Capitals; 1997–2002	Succeeded by Bruce Cassidy
Preceded by Cap Raeder	Head coach of the San Jose Sharks; 2002–08	Succeeded by Todd McLellan
Preceded by Paul Maurice	Head coach of the Toronto Maple Leafs; 2008–12	Succeeded by Randy Carlyle
