= Lance Nethery =

Canadian ice hockey player, coach, and executive

- Born: June 28, 1957 (age 69) Toronto, Ontario, Canada
- Height: 6 ft 1 in (185 cm)
- Weight: 185 lb (84 kg; 13 st 3 lb)
- Position: Centre
- Shot: Left
- Played for: New York Rangers; Edmonton Oilers; HC Davos
- NHL draft: 131st overall, 1977; New York Rangers
- Playing career: 1979–1990

Lance Nethery (born June 28, 1957) is a Canadian former professional ice hockey centre and coach, and current executive. He played 41 games in the National Hockey League with the New York Rangers and Edmonton Oilers during the 1980–81 and 1981–82 seasons. The rest of his career, which lasted from 1979 to 1990, was split between the minor leagues and then in Europe, mainly in the Swiss Nationalliga A. After his playing career Nethrey became a coach and manager in the Deutsche Eishockey Liga, working in those roles between 1993 and 2019.

== Playing career ==
Nethery was born in Toronto, Ontario, and raised in Burlington, Ontario. He attended Cornell University, playing for the Cornell Big Red, and midway through his college career he was selected by the New York Rangers, 131st overall, in the eighth round of the 1977 NHL amateur draft. The same year he was named to the ECAC Second All-Star team, and the following two seasons he was named to both the ECAC First All-Star Team and the NCAA East First All-American Team. He was also named ECAC Player of the Year in 1978.

Nethery still holds the Cornell records for assists and points in a season, as well as career assists and points. His scoring touch stayed with him as a professional player, and he averaged over a point per game in parts of three seasons with the New Haven Nighthawks and Springfield Indians of the American Hockey League (AHL).

Nethery played 41 National Hockey League games in two seasons, for the New York Rangers and Edmonton Oilers. After joining the Oilers in a trade for Eddie Mio, Nethery played only three more NHL games, despite putting up two points.

In 1982, Nethery left North America, signing with Duisburger SC in Germany.

He played dominantly in the minor leagues before signing a contract with HC Davos of the Swiss Nationalliga A. Nethery won two championships with Davos, and retired in 1988. In 186 regular season games with HC Davos he averaged 1.92 points per game.

== Coaching and managing career ==
Nethery was named the head coach of Davos for the 1990–91 season, and was fired midway through. In 1993 he joined German hockey club Landshut as an assistant coach, and then became the head coach of Mannheim from 1994 to 1999, during which time his team won the league championship three times. In 1999 he became the head coach of Cologne, as well as general manager in 2000, until January 2002. During this time he also was an assistant coach with Team Canada for the 2001 Deutschland Cup. He joined the Frankfurt Lions as head coach on April 11, 2002, and was subsequently elevated to general manager on February 5, 2003, leading the team to its first championship. He was hired as the GM of the DEG Metro Stars prior to the 2005–06 season. His contract, set to expire in 2008, was extended through 2012. Nethery and the Metro Stars parted ways by mutual consent in January 2012.

He then was chief executive officer of Düsseldorf's rival Kölner Haie between February 2013 and October 2014.

In January 2015, Nethery was named team principal of German Oberliga side Füchse Duisburg and also took over head coaching duties beginning with the 2016-17 campaign. He was released on February 12, 2017, but returned to the Füchse team on May 1, 2018 as sporting director.

== Personal ==
Nethery and his wife Elizabeth have a daughter, Meredith. Meredith graduated from Cornell University in 2009.

== Career statistics ==
=== Regular season and playoffs ===
			Regular season					Playoffs
Season	Team	League	GP	G	A	Pts	PIM	GP	G	A	Pts	PIM
1974–75	Burlington Mohawks	COJHL	40	51	69	120	—	—	—	—	—	—
1975–76	Cornell University	ECAC	29	18	27	45	18	—	—	—	—	—
1976–77	Cornell University	ECAC	29	32	46	78	18	—	—	—	—	—
1977–78	Cornell University	ECAC	26	23	60	83	12	—	—	—	—	—
1978–79	Cornell University	ECAC	27	18	47	65	30	—	—	—	—	—
1978–79	New Haven Nighthawks	AHL	1	0	0	0	0	—	—	—	—	—
1979–80	New Haven Nighthawks	AHL	74	23	39	62	20	10	3	12	15	2
1980–81	New York Rangers	NHL	33	11	12	23	12	14	5	3	8	9
1980–81	New Haven Nighthawks	AHL	36	18	30	48	8	—	—	—	—	—
1981–82	New York Rangers	NHL	5	0	0	0	0	—	—	—	—	—
1981–82	Edmonton Oilers	NHL	3	0	2	2	2	—	—	—	—	—
1981–82	Springfield Indians	AHL	9	5	5	10	0	—	—	—	—	—
1981–82	Wichita Wind	CHL	46	35	32	67	26	7	1	4	5	8
1982–83	Wichita Wind	CHL	10	7	5	12	0	—	—	—	—	—
1982–83	Duisburger SC	GER-2	42	72	84	156	—	—	—	—	—	—
1983–84	HC Davos	NLA	40	39	43	82	—	—	—	—	—	—
1984–85	HC Davos	NLA	38	42	36	78	—	—	—	—	—	—
1985–86	HC Davos	NLA	36	46	33	79	38	5	2	5	7	4
1985–86	Hershey Bears	AHL	13	5	6	11	2	18	4	9	13	2
1986–87	HC Davos	NLA	36	23	31	54	12	7	8	7	15	6
1987–88	HC Davos	NLA	36	37	27	64	66	6	4	4	8	10
1988–89	SC Herisau	NLB	36	35	52	87	30	—	—	—	—	—
1989–90	SC Herisau	NLB	36	26	49	75	35	10	6	7	13	22
NLA totals			186	187	170	357	116	18	14	16	30	20
NHL totals			41	11	14	25	14	14	5	3	8	9

== Awards and honors ==
Award	Year
All-ECAC Hockey Second Team	1976–77
All-ECAC Hockey First Team	1977–78
AHCA East All-American	1977–78
All-ECAC Hockey First Team	1978–79
AHCA East All-American	1978–79

Awards and achievements
Preceded by Dave Taylor	ECAC Hockey Player of the Year; 1977–78	Succeeded by Ralph Cox
