= Merlin Malinowski =

Canadian ice hockey player (born 1958)

- Born: September 27, 1958 (age 67) North Battleford, Saskatchewan, Canada
- Height: 6 ft 0 in (183 cm)
- Weight: 190 lb (86 kg; 13 st 8 lb)
- Position: Centre
- Shot: Left
- Played for: Colorado Rockies; New Jersey Devils; Hartford Whalers; Arosa
- National team: Canada
- NHL draft: 27th overall, 1978; Colorado Rockies
- Playing career: 1978–1991

Merlin "The Magician" Malinowski (born September 27, 1958) is a Canadian former professional ice hockey centre. Malinowski was born in North Battleford, Saskatchewan, but grew up in Meadow Lake, Saskatchewan.

== Playing career ==
Malinowski was drafted in the 2nd Round, 27th overall by the Colorado Rockies in the 1978 NHL entry draft. He played 5 seasons in the National Hockey League for the Rockies, the New Jersey Devils and the Hartford Whalers. He then had a long spell in Switzerland, playing for the EHC Arosa and later the SCL Tigers from 1983 until his retirement in 1991. He also played for the Canadian Olympic Team that finished 4th in the 1988 Winter Olympics.

== Career statistics ==
=== Regular season and playoffs ===
| | | | Regular season | | | | | Playoffs |
| Season | Team | League | GP | G | A | Pts | PIM | GP | G | A | Pts | PIM |
|---|---|---|---|---|---|---|---|---|---|---|---|---|
| 1973–74 | Drumheller Falcons | AJHL | 2 | 0 | 0 | 0 | 0 | — | — | — | — | — |
| 1974–75 | Drumheller Falcons | AJHL | 59 | 23 | 44 | 67 | 58 | — | — | — | — | — |
| 1975–76 | Drumheller Falcons | AJHL | 59 | 60 | 86 | 146 | 79 | — | — | — | — | — |
| 1976–77 | Medicine Hat Tigers | WCHL | 70 | 22 | 48 | 70 | 40 | 4 | 1 | 5 | 6 | 4 |
| 1977–78 | Medicine Hat Tigers | WCHL | 72 | 48 | 78 | 126 | 131 | 11 | 9 | 11 | 20 | 16 |
| 1978–79 | Colorado Rockies | NHL | 54 | 6 | 17 | 23 | 10 | — | — | — | — | — |
| 1978–79 | Philadelphia Firebirds | AHL | 25 | 3 | 9 | 12 | 12 | — | — | — | — | — |
| 1979–80 | Fort Worth Texans | CHL | 66 | 34 | 42 | 76 | 58 | 15 | 8 | 16 | 24 | 34 |
| 1979–80 | Colorado Rockies | NHL | 10 | 2 | 4 | 6 | 2 | — | — | — | — | — |
| 1980–81 | Colorado Rockies | NHL | 69 | 25 | 37 | 62 | 61 | — | — | — | — | — |
| 1981–82 | Colorado Rockies | NHL | 69 | 13 | 28 | 41 | 32 | — | — | — | — | — |
| 1982–83 | New Jersey Devils | NHL | 5 | 3 | 2 | 5 | 0 | — | — | — | — | — |
| 1982–83 | Hartford Whalers | NHL | 75 | 5 | 23 | 28 | 16 | — | — | — | — | — |
| 1983–84 | EHC Arosa | NDA | 32 | 37 | 26 | 63 | — | — | — | — | — | — |
| 1984–85 | EHC Arosa | NDA | 38 | 49 | 33 | 82 | 35 | — | — | — | — | — |
| 1985–86 | EHC Arosa | NDA | 32 | 25 | 29 | 54 | 44 | — | — | — | — | — |
| 1986–87 | SC Langnau | SUI.2 | 36 | 29 | 44 | 73 | 50 | 5 | 8 | 9 | 17 | 14 |
| 1987–88 | SC Langnau | NDA | 36 | 30 | 35 | 65 | 88 | — | — | — | — | — |
| 1987–88 | Canadian National Team | Intl | 10 | 3 | 2 | 5 | 0 | — | — | — | — | — |
| 1988–89 | SC Langnau | SUI.2 | 36 | 28 | 34 | 62 | 58 | 10 | 7 | 8 | 15 | 28 |
| 1989–90 | SC Langnau | SUI.2 | 36 | 31 | 31 | 62 | 60 | 9 | 9 | 16 | 25 | 4 |
| 1990–91 | SC Langnau | SUI.2 | 33 | 21 | 29 | 50 | 40 | 10 | 6 | 15 | 21 | 10 |
| NHL totals | | | 282 | 54 | 111 | 165 | 121 | — | — | — | — | — |
| NDA totals | | | 138 | 141 | 123 | 264 | 167 | — | — | — | — | — |
| SUI.2 totals | | | 141 | 109 | 138 | 247 | 208 | 34 | 30 | 48 | 78 | 56 |

=== International ===
| Year | Team | Event | GP | G | A | Pts | PIM |
|---|---|---|---|---|---|---|---|
| 1988 | Canada | OG | 8 | 3 | 2 | 5 | 0 |
| Senior totals | | | 8 | 3 | 2 | 5 | 0 |
