= Don Laurence =

Canadian ice hockey player

- Born: June 27, 1957 (age 67); Galt, Ontario, Canada
- Height: 5 ft 9 in (175 cm)
- Weight: 173 lb (78 kg; 12 st 5 lb)
- Position: Centre
- Shot: Right
- Played for: Atlanta Flames; St. Louis Blues
- NHL draft: 28th overall, 1977; Atlanta Flames
- WHA draft: 37th overall, 1977; Winnipeg Jets
- Playing career: 1977–1992

Donald Gray "Red" Laurence (born June 27, 1957) is a Canadian former professional ice hockey forward who played 79 games in the National Hockey League for the Atlanta Flames and St. Louis Blues between 1978 and 1980. The rest of his career, which lasted from 1977 to 1992, was spent in the minor leagues and then in Switzerland.

== Career statistics ==
=== Regular season and playoffs ===
			Regular season					Playoffs
Season	Team	League	GP	G	A	Pts	PIM	GP	G	A	Pts	PIM
1973–74	Peterborough Petes	OHA	60	28	15	43	41	—	—	—	—	—
1974–75	Peterborough Petes	OMJHL	69	40	49	89	53	11	5	6	11	13
1975–76	Kitchener Rangers	OMJHL	59	50	36	86	75	8	5	3	8	15
1976–77	Kitchener Rangers	OMJHL	35	43	45	88	14	—	—	—	—	—
1977–78	Tulsa Oilers	CHL	39	15	11	26	10	7	3	2	5	4
1978–79	Atlanta Flames	NHL	59	14	20	34	6	—	—	—	—	—
1978–79	Nova Scotia Voyageurs	AHL	20	7	7	14	9	—	—	—	—	—
1979–80	St. Louis Blues	NHL	20	1	2	3	8	—	—	—	—	—
1979–80	Salt Lake Golden Eagles	CHL	27	7	15	22	8	13	9	3	12	2
1980–81	Salt Lake Golden Eagles	CHL	71	39	33	72	41	17	6	5	11	8
1981–82	Indianapolis Checkers	CHL	77	43	55	98	43	13	10	5	15	18
1982–83	Indianapolis Checkers	CHL	80	43	55	98	33	13	11	11	22	2
1983–84	Indianapolis Checkers	CHL	69	41	37	78	42	10	9	4	13	0
1984–85	HC Ambri-Piotta	NLB	35	58	20	78	—	—	—	—	—	—
1985–86	HC Ambri-Piotta	NLA	24	27	12	39	20	—	—	—	—	—
1986–87	EV Zug	NLB	36	59	23	82	28	6	3	7	10	8
1987–88	EV Zug	NLA	30	27	12	39	22	—	—	—	—	—
1988–89	EV Zug	NLA	36	46	27	73	30	3	3	1	4	4
1989–90	EV Zug	NLA	36	32	29	61	37	2	2	0	2	2
1990–91	EV Zug	NLA	28	22	14	36	25	—	—	—	—	—
1991–92	Lausanne HC	NLA	28	19	26	45	34	—	—	—	—	—
NLA totals			154	154	94	248	134	5	5	1	6	6
NHL totals			79	15	22	37	14	—	—	—	—	—

=== International ===
Year	Team	Event	GP	G	A	Pts	PIM
1974	Canada	WJC	4	1	0	1	10
Junior totals			4	1	0	1	10
