= Ross Yates =

Canadian ice hockey player and coach

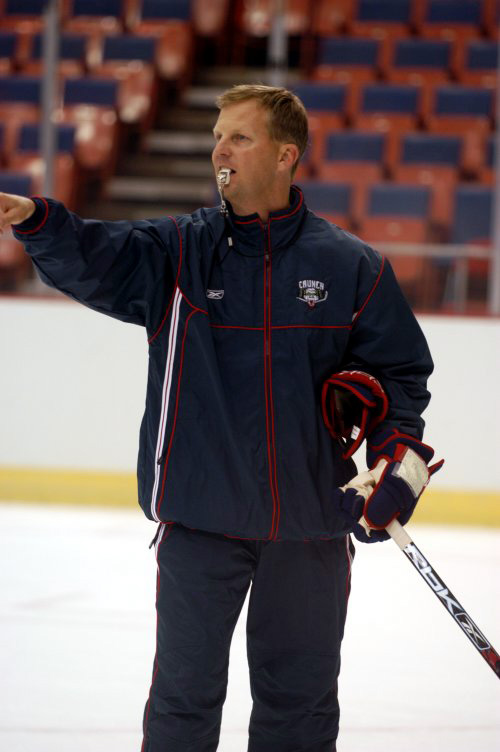
- Yates in 2006
- Born: June 18, 1959 (age 66) Montreal, Quebec, Canada
- Height: 5 ft 11 in (180 cm)
- Weight: 170 lb (77 kg; 12 st 2 lb)
- Position: Centre
- Shot: Right
- Played for: Hartford Whalers
- NHL draft: Undrafted
- Playing career: 1981–1992

Ross Richard Yates (born June 18, 1959) is a Canadian former National Hockey League (NHL) player and a former American Hockey League (AHL) head coach.

== Biography ==
As a youth, Yates played in the 1970, 1971 and 1972 Quebec International Pee-Wee Hockey Tournaments with a minor ice hockey team from Mount Royal, Quebec. Yates was an All-Canadian with the Mount Allison University Mounties where he set Canadian college scoring records. He played seven (NHL) games with the Hartford Whalers during the 1983–84 season. He played in Europe after his NHL years and then entered coaching. He is the former head coach of both the Syracuse Crunch of the AHL and the Saint John Sea Dogs of the QMJHL.

== Career statistics ==
			Regular season					Playoffs
Season	Team	League	GP	G	A	Pts	PIM	GP	G	A	Pts	PIM
1976–77	Mount Allison University	AUAA	20	7	7	14	18	—	—	—	—	—
1977–78	Mount Allison University	AUAA	20	8	21	29	38	—	—	—	—	—
1978–79	Mount Allison University	AUAA	20	21	26	47	34	—	—	—	—	—
1979–80	Mount Allison University	AUAA	27	23	54	77	14	—	—	—	—	—
1980–81	Mount Allison University	AUAA	21	16	56	72	12	—	—	—	—	—
1980–81	Binghamton Whalers	AHL	14	4	1	5	2	5	0	0	0	0
1981–82	Binghamton Whalers	AHL	80	22	23	45	53	15	5	6	11	10
1982–83	Binghamton Whalers	AHL	77	41	84	125	28	5	0	6	6	2
1983–84	Hartford Whalers	NHL	7	1	1	2	4	—	—	—	—	—
1983–84	Binghamton Whalers	AHL	69	35	73	108	82	—	—	—	—	—
1984–85	Mannheimer ERC	1.GBun	35	31	39	70	45	9	9	8	17	—
1984–85	Fredericton Express	AHL	—	—	—	—	—	5	0	2	2	4
1985–86	Mannheimer ERC	1.GBun	36	20	41	61	38	—	—	—	—	—
1985–86	Rochester Americans	AHL	22	4	8	12	4	—	—	—	—	—
1986–87	EHC Kloten	NDA	33	36	39	75	28	—	—	—	—	—
1987–88	EHC Kloten	NDA	36	31	40	71	26	5	1	9	10	12
1988–89	EHC Kloten	NDA	36	34	36	70	21	6	2	6	8	2
1989–90	EHC Kloten	NDA	31	15	26	41	40	—	—	—	—	—
1990–91	SC Rapperswil–Jona	SUI.2	32	26	39	65	34	6	5	9	14	4
1991–92	HC Auronzo	ITA.2	24	29	40	69	26	—	—	—	—	—
1991–92	EHC Kloten	NDA	2	0	1	1	0	—	—	—	—	—
AHL totals			262	106	189	295	169	30	5	14	19	16
1.GBun totals			71	51	80	131	83	9	9	8	17	—
NDA totals			138	116	142	258	115	11	3	15	18	14
