= 1996 World Cup of Hockey rosters =

Listed below are the rosters for the eight teams participating in the 1996 World Cup of Hockey.

== Canada ==
Head coach: Glen Sather

Assistant coaches: Marc Crawford, Mike Johnston, Andy Murry

No.	Pos.	Name	Height	Weight	Birthdate	1996-97 Team
1	G	Martin Brodeur	6 ft 2 in (188 cm)	220 lb (100 kg)	May 6, 1972 (aged 24)	(United States) New Jersey Devils
31	G	Curtis Joseph	5 ft 11 in (180 cm)	194 lb (88 kg)	April 29, 1967 (aged 29)	(Canada) Edmonton Oilers
30	G	Bill Ranford	5 ft 11 in (180 cm)	185 lb (84 kg)	December 14, 1966 (aged 29)	(United States) Boston Bruins (Note: Traded to the Washington Capitals on March 1, 1997)
44	D	Rob Blake	6 ft 4 in (193 cm)	220 lb (100 kg)	December 10, 1969 (aged 26)	(United States) Los Angeles Kings
77	D	Paul Coffey	6 ft 0 in (183 cm)	201 lb (91 kg)	June 1, 1961 (aged 35)	(United States) Hartford Whalers (Note: Traded to the Philadelphia Flyers on December 15, 1996)
3	D	Sylvain Côté	6 ft 0 in (183 cm)	190 lb (86 kg)	January 19, 1966 (aged 30)	(United States) Washington Capitals
37	D	Éric Desjardins	6 ft 1 in (185 cm)	203 lb (92 kg)	June 14, 1969 (aged 27)	(United States) Philadelphia Flyers
52	D	Adam Foote	6 ft 2 in (188 cm)	227 lb (103 kg)	July 10, 1971 (aged 25)	(United States) Colorado Avalanche
27	D	Scott Niedermayer	6 ft 1 in (185 cm)	201 lb (91 kg)	August 31, 1973 (aged 23)	(United States) New Jersey Devils
24	D	Lyle Odelein	6 ft 0 in (183 cm)	205 lb (93 kg)	July 21, 1968 (aged 28)	(United States) New Jersey Devils
4	D	Scott Stevens	6 ft 2 in (188 cm)	216 lb (98 kg)	April 1, 1964 (aged 32)	(United States) New Jersey Devils
17	F	Rod Brind'Amour	6 ft 1 in (185 cm)	205 lb (93 kg)	August 9, 1970 (aged 26)	(United States) Philadelphia Flyers
25	F	Vincent Damphousse	6 ft 1 in (185 cm)	205 lb (93 kg)	December 7, 1967 (aged 28)	(Canada) Montreal Canadiens
14	F	Theoren Fleury	5 ft 6 in (168 cm)	181 lb (82 kg)	June 29, 1968 (aged 28)	(Canada) Calgary Flames
9	F	Adam Graves	6 ft 0 in (183 cm)	203 lb (92 kg)	August 12, 1968 (aged 28)	(United States) New York Rangers
99	F	Wayne Gretzky (C)	6 ft 0 in (183 cm)	185 lb (84 kg)	January 26, 1961 (aged 35)	(United States) New York Rangers
22	F	Claude Lemieux	6 ft 1 in (185 cm)	216 lb (98 kg)	July 16, 1965 (aged 31)	(United States) Colorado Avalanche
18	F	Trevor Linden	6 ft 4 in (193 cm)	209 lb (95 kg)	April 11, 1970 (aged 26)	(Canada) Vancouver Canucks
88	F	Eric Lindros	6 ft 4 in (193 cm)	240 lb (110 kg)	February 28, 1973 (aged 23)	(United States) Philadelphia Flyers
11	F	Mark Messier (A)	6 ft 1 in (185 cm)	205 lb (93 kg)	January 18, 1961 (aged 35)	(United States) New York Rangers
55	F	Keith Primeau	6 ft 5 in (196 cm)	220 lb (100 kg)	November 24, 1971 (aged 24)	(United States) Hartford Whalers
20	F	Joe Sakic	5 ft 11 in (180 cm)	194 lb (88 kg)	July 7, 1969 (aged 27)	(United States) Colorado Avalanche
94	F	Brendan Shanahan	6 ft 3 in (191 cm)	220 lb (100 kg)	January 23, 1969 (aged 27)	(United States) Hartford Whalers (Note: Traded to the Detroit Red Wings on October 9, 1996)
16	F	Pat Verbeek	5 ft 9 in (175 cm)	190 lb (86 kg)	May 24, 1964 (aged 32)	(United States) Dallas Stars
19	F	Steve Yzerman (A)	5 ft 11 in (180 cm)	185 lb (84 kg)	May 9, 1965 (aged 31)	(United States) Detroit Red Wings

== Czech Republic ==
Head coach: Luděk Bukač

Assistant coaches: Slavomír Lener, Zdenek Uher

No.	Pos.	Name	Height	Weight	Birthdate	1996-97 Team
29	G	Roman Čechmánek	6 ft 3 in (191 cm)	201 lb (91 kg)	March 2, 1971 (aged 25)	(Czech Republic) HC Vsetín
1	G	Petr Bříza	6 ft 0 in (183 cm)	181 lb (82 kg)	December 9, 1964 (aged 31)	(Germany) EV Landshut
2	G	Roman Turek	6 ft 4 in (193 cm)	220 lb (100 kg)	May 21, 1970 (aged 26)	(United States) Michigan K-Wings (Note: Played seven games for the Dallas Stars, Michigan's NHL affiliate)
44	D	Roman Hamrlík	6 ft 1 in (185 cm)	207 lb (94 kg)	April 12, 1974 (aged 22)	(United States) Tampa Bay Lightning
12	D	František Kaberle	6 ft 1 in (185 cm)	190 lb (86 kg)	November 8, 1973 (aged 22)	(Sweden) MoDo Hockey
5	D	Drahomír Kadlec	5 ft 11 in (180 cm)	190 lb (86 kg)	November 29, 1965 (aged 30)	(Germany) Kaufbeurer Adler (Note: Played 18 games for AC Zlín)
94	D	Stanislav Neckář	6 ft 1 in (185 cm)	212 lb (96 kg)	December 22, 1975 (aged 20)	(Canada) Ottawa Senators
28	D	Jiří Šlégr	6 ft 1 in (185 cm)	210 lb (95 kg)	May 30, 1971 (aged 25)	(Sweden) Södertälje SK (Note: Played one game for HC Chemopetrol and five games for HC Karlovy Vary)
38	D	Michal Sýkora	6 ft 5 in (196 cm)	234 lb (106 kg)	July 5, 1973 (aged 23)	(United States) San Jose Sharks (Note: Traded to the Chicago Blackhawks on January 25, 1997)
7	D	Jiři Veber	6 ft 1 in (185 cm)	203 lb (92 kg)	November 29, 1968 (aged 27)	(Czech Republic) HC Vsetín
4	D	Jiři Vykoukal	5 ft 11 in (180 cm)	187 lb (85 kg)	March 11, 1971 (aged 25)	(Czech Republic) HC Sparta Praha
42	F	Josef Beránek	6 ft 2 in (188 cm)	185 lb (84 kg)	October 25, 1969 (aged 26)	(Czech Republic) HC Vsetín (Note: Played 13 games for the Pittsburgh Penguins)
76	F	Radek Bonk	6 ft 2 in (188 cm)	209 lb (95 kg)	January 9, 1976 (aged 20)	(Canada) Ottawa Senators
16	F	Jiří Dopita	6 ft 4 in (193 cm)	227 lb (103 kg)	December 2, 1968 (aged 27)	(Czech Republic) HC Vsetín
21	F	Bobby Holík	6 ft 4 in (193 cm)	231 lb (105 kg)	January 1, 1971 (aged 25)	(United States) New Jersey Devils
68	F	Jaromír Jágr (A)	6 ft 3 in (191 cm)	230 lb (100 kg)	February 15, 1972 (aged 24)	(United States) Pittsburgh Penguins
14	F	Jiři Kučera	6 ft 0 in (183 cm)	181 lb (82 kg)	March 28, 1966 (aged 30)	(Czech Republic) HC Plzeň
13	F	Robert Lang (A)	6 ft 3 in (191 cm)	212 lb (96 kg)	December 19, 1970 (aged 25)	(Czech Republic) HC Sparta Praha
93	F	Petr Nedvěd	6 ft 4 in (193 cm)	205 lb (93 kg)	December 9, 1971 (aged 24)	(United States) Pittsburgh Penguins
10	F	Pavel Patera	6 ft 1 in (185 cm)	187 lb (85 kg)	September 6, 1971 (aged 25)	(Sweden) AIK
20	F	Martin Procházka	5 ft 11 in (180 cm)	181 lb (82 kg)	March 3, 1972 (aged 24)	(Sweden) AIK
26	F	Robert Reichel (C)	5 ft 10 in (178 cm)	183 lb (83 kg)	June 25, 1971 (aged 25)	(Canada) Calgary Flames (Note: Traded to the New York Islanders on March 18, 1997)
2	F	Martin Ručinský	6 ft 2 in (188 cm)	209 lb (95 kg)	March 11, 1971 (aged 25)	(Canada) Montreal Canadiens
82	F	Martin Straka	5 ft 9 in (175 cm)	174 lb (79 kg)	September 3, 1972 (aged 24)	(United States) Florida Panthers
17	F	Petr Sýkora	6 ft 0 in (183 cm)	190 lb (86 kg)	November 19, 1976 (aged 19)	(United States) Albany River Rats (Note: Played 19 games for the New Jersey Devils, Albany's NHL affiliate)
24	F	Otakar Vejvoda	5 ft 8 in (173 cm)	161 lb (73 kg)	June 8, 1972 (aged 24)	(Sweden) AIK

== Finland ==
Head coach: (Sweden) Curt Lindström

Assistant coach: Hannu Aravirta

No.	Pos.	Name	Height	Weight	Birthdate	1996-97 Team
30	G	Markus Ketterer	5 ft 11 in (180 cm)	179 lb (81 kg)	August 23, 1967 (aged 29)	(Sweden) Färjestad BK
35	G	Jarmo Myllys	5 ft 9 in (175 cm)	172 lb (78 kg)	May 29, 1965 (aged 31)	(Sweden) Luleå HF
1	G	Kari Takko	6 ft 2 in (188 cm)	192 lb (87 kg)	June 23, 1962 (aged 34)	(Finland) Ässät
2	D	Marko Kiprusoff	6 ft 0 in (183 cm)	209 lb (95 kg)	February 6, 1972 (aged 24)	(Sweden) MIF Redhawks
12	D	Janne Laukkanen	6 ft 0 in (183 cm)	187 lb (85 kg)	March 19, 1970 (aged 26)	(Canada) Ottawa Senators
21	D	Jyrki Lumme	6 ft 1 in (185 cm)	214 lb (97 kg)	July 16, 1966 (aged 30)	(Canada) Vancouver Canucks
6	D	Janne Niinimaa	6 ft 1 in (185 cm)	220 lb (100 kg)	May 22, 1975 (aged 21)	(United States) Philadelphia Flyers
3	D	Petteri Nummelin	5 ft 10 in (178 cm)	194 lb (88 kg)	November 25, 1972 (aged 23)	(Sweden) Västra Frölunda HC
27	D	Teppo Numminen	6 ft 1 in (185 cm)	198 lb (90 kg)	July 3, 1968 (aged 28)	(United States) Phoenix Coyotes
26	D	Mika Strömberg	6 ft 0 in (183 cm)	194 lb (88 kg)	February 28, 1970 (aged 26)	(Finland) Jokerit
23	D	Hannu Virta	5 ft 11 in (180 cm)	181 lb (82 kg)	March 22, 1963 (aged 33)	(Finland) TPS
14	F	Raimo Helminen (A)	6 ft 0 in (183 cm)	194 lb (88 kg)	March 11, 1964 (aged 32)	(Finland) Ilves
24	F	Sami Kapanen	5 ft 10 in (178 cm)	181 lb (82 kg)	June 14, 1973 (aged 23)	(United States) Hartford Whalers
11	F	Saku Koivu	5 ft 10 in (178 cm)	181 lb (82 kg)	November 23, 1974 (aged 21)	(Canada) Montreal Canadiens
17	F	Jari Kurri (C)	6 ft 0 in (183 cm)	198 lb (90 kg)	May 18, 1960 (aged 36)	(United States) Mighty Ducks of Anaheim
20	F	Jere Lehtinen	6 ft 0 in (183 cm)	194 lb (88 kg)	June 24, 1973 (aged 23)	(United States) Dallas Stars
40	F	Mika Nieminen	6 ft 1 in (185 cm)	203 lb (92 kg)	January 1, 1966 (aged 30)	(Switzerland) Grasshopper Club Zürich
37	F	Kai Nurminen	6 ft 1 in (185 cm)	198 lb (90 kg)	March 29, 1969 (aged 27)	(United States) Los Angeles Kings
80	F	Janne Ojanen	6 ft 2 in (188 cm)	203 lb (92 kg)	April 9, 1968 (aged 28)	(Sweden) MIF Redhawks
16	F	Ville Peltonen	5 ft 11 in (180 cm)	187 lb (85 kg)	May 24, 1973 (aged 23)	(United States) San Jose Sharks (Note: Played 40 games for the Kentucky Thoroughblades, San Jose's NHL affiliate)
29	F	Juha Riihijärvi	6 ft 2 in (188 cm)	203 lb (92 kg)	December 15, 1973 (aged 22)	(Sweden) MIF Redhawks
22	F	Christian Ruuttu	6 ft 0 in (183 cm)	201 lb (91 kg)	February 20, 1964 (aged 32)	(Switzerland) Grasshopper Club Zürich
8	F	Teemu Selänne (A)	6 ft 0 in (183 cm)	201 lb (91 kg)	July 3, 1970 (aged 26)	(United States) Mighty Ducks of Anaheim
25	F	Juha Ylönen	6 ft 1 in (185 cm)	185 lb (84 kg)	February 13, 1972 (aged 24)	(United States) Springfield Falcons (Note: Played two games for the Phoenix Coyotes, Springfield's NHL affiliate)

== Germany ==
Head coach: (Canada) George Kingston

Assistant coaches: Erich Kühnhackl, (Canada) Jim Setters

No.	Pos.	Name	Height	Weight	Birthdate	1996-97 Team
30	G	Josef Heiß	5 ft 11 in (180 cm)	187 lb (85 kg)	June 13, 1963 (aged 33)	(Germany) Kölner Haie
1	G	Olaf Kölzig	6 ft 3 in (191 cm)	225 lb (102 kg)	April 6, 1970 (aged 26)	(United States) Washington Capitals
27	G	Klaus Merk	5 ft 11 in (180 cm)	185 lb (84 kg)	April 26, 1967 (aged 29)	(Germany) Berlin Capitals
47	D	Brad Bergen	5 ft 11 in (180 cm)	176 lb (80 kg)	March 16, 1966 (aged 30)	(Germany) Düsseldorfer EG
36	D	Erich Goldmann	6 ft 3 in (191 cm)	221 lb (100 kg)	April 7, 1976 (aged 20)	(Germany) Kaufbeurer Adler
24	D	Mike Heidt	6 ft 1 in (185 cm)	190 lb (86 kg)	November 7, 1963 (aged 32)	(Germany) EV Landshut
3	D	Torsten Kienass	6 ft 0 in (183 cm)	201 lb (91 kg)	February 23, 1971 (aged 25)	(Germany) Nürnberg Ice Tigers
41	D	Daniel Kunce	6 ft 1 in (185 cm)	205 lb (93 kg)	July 17, 1971 (aged 25)	(Germany) Kaufbeurer Adler
12	D	Mirko Lüdemann	5 ft 11 in (180 cm)	192 lb (87 kg)	December 15, 1973 (aged 22)	(Germany) Kölner Haie
35	D	Jayson Meyer	5 ft 11 in (180 cm)	187 lb (85 kg)	February 12, 1965 (aged 31)	(Germany) Kölner Haie (Note: Played 14 games for Krefeld Pinguine)
25	D	Daniel Nowak	6 ft 1 in (185 cm)	225 lb (102 kg)	July 22, 1966 (aged 30)	(Germany) SERC Wild Wings
83	F	Jan Benda	6 ft 2 in (188 cm)	218 lb (99 kg)	April 28, 1972 (aged 24)	(Czech Republic) HC Sparta Praha
7	F	Thomas Brandl	5 ft 9 in (175 cm)	165 lb (75 kg)	February 9, 1969 (aged 27)	(Germany) Düsseldorfer EG
16	F	Benoit Doucet (A)	5 ft 9 in (175 cm)	183 lb (83 kg)	April 23, 1963 (aged 33)	(Germany) Düsseldorfer EG
17	F	Peter Draisaitl (A)	6 ft 0 in (183 cm)	190 lb (86 kg)	December 7, 1965 (aged 30)	(Germany) Kölner Haie
29	F	Jochen Hecht	6 ft 1 in (185 cm)	192 lb (87 kg)	June 21, 1977 (aged 19)	(Germany) Adler Mannheim
23	F	Dieter Hegen (C)	6 ft 0 in (183 cm)	198 lb (90 kg)	April 29, 1962 (aged 34)	(Germany) Düsseldorfer EG
21	F	Andreas Lupzig	6 ft 2 in (188 cm)	198 lb (90 kg)	August 5, 1968 (aged 28)	(Germany) Kölner Haie
81	F	Mark MacKay	5 ft 8 in (173 cm)	181 lb (82 kg)	May 28, 1964 (aged 32)	(Germany) SERC Wild Wings
10	F	Reemt Pyka	6 ft 1 in (185 cm)	196 lb (89 kg)	January 11, 1969 (aged 27)	(Germany) Krefeld Pinguine
20	F	Jürgen Rumrich	5 ft 11 in (180 cm)	187 lb (85 kg)	March 20, 1968 (aged 28)	(Germany) Berlin Capitals
13	F	Leo Stefan	6 ft 0 in (183 cm)	181 lb (82 kg)	February 22, 1970 (aged 26)	(Germany) Düsseldorfer EG
26	F	Stefan Ustorf	5 ft 11 in (180 cm)	194 lb (88 kg)	January 3, 1974 (aged 22)	(United States) Portland Pirates (Note: Played six games for the Washington Capitals, Portland's NHL affiliate)

== Russia ==
Head coach: Boris Mikhailov

Assistant coaches: Sergei Makarov, Yevgeni Zimin

No.	Pos.	Name	Height	Weight	Birthdate	1996-97 Team
35	G	Nikolai Khabibulin	6 ft 1 in (185 cm)	207 lb (94 kg)	January 13, 1973 (aged 23)	(United States) Phoenix Coyotes
31	G	Mikhail Shtalenkov	6 ft 1 in (185 cm)	183 lb (83 kg)	October 20, 1965 (aged 30)	(United States) Mighty Ducks of Anaheim
30	G	Andrei Trefilov	6 ft 0 in (183 cm)	181 lb (82 kg)	August 31, 1969 (aged 27)	(United States) Buffalo Sabres
2	D	Vyacheslav Fetisov (C)	6 ft 0 in (183 cm)	218 lb (99 kg)	April 20, 1958 (aged 38)	(United States) Detroit Red Wings
55	D	Sergei Gonchar	6 ft 2 in (188 cm)	209 lb (95 kg)	April 13, 1974 (aged 22)	(United States) Washington Capitals
25	D	Alexander Karpovtsev	6 ft 2 in (188 cm)	231 lb (105 kg)	April 7, 1970 (aged 26)	(United States) New York Rangers
11	D	Darius Kasparaitis	5 ft 10 in (178 cm)	207 lb (94 kg)	October 16, 1972 (aged 23)	(United States) New York Islanders (Note: Traded to the Pittsburgh Penguins on November 17, 1996)
38	D	Vladimir Malakhov	6 ft 4 in (193 cm)	229 lb (104 kg)	August 30, 1968 (aged 28)	(Canada) Montreal Canadiens
7	D	Oleg Tverdovsky	6 ft 1 in (185 cm)	209 lb (95 kg)	May 8, 1976 (aged 20)	(United States) Phoenix Coyotes
4	D	Igor Ulanov	6 ft 1 in (185 cm)	203 lb (92 kg)	October 1, 1969 (aged 26)	(United States) Tampa Bay Lightning
26	D	Dmitri Yushkevich	5 ft 11 in (180 cm)	207 lb (94 kg)	November 19, 1971 (aged 24)	(Canada) Toronto Maple Leafs
44	D	Alexei Zhitnik	5 ft 10 in (178 cm)	203 lb (92 kg)	October 10, 1972 (aged 23)	(United States) Buffalo Sabres
56	D	Sergei Zubov	6 ft 1 in (185 cm)	201 lb (91 kg)	July 22, 1970 (aged 26)	(United States) Dallas Stars
20	F	Sergei Berezin	5 ft 10 in (178 cm)	196 lb (89 kg)	November 5, 1971 (aged 24)	(Canada) Toronto Maple Leafs
18	F	Valeri Bure	5 ft 11 in (180 cm)	181 lb (82 kg)	June 13, 1974 (aged 22)	(Canada) Montreal Canadiens
91	F	Sergei Fedorov (A)	6 ft 1 in (185 cm)	183 lb (83 kg)	October 20, 1965 (aged 30)	(United States) Detroit Red Wings
51	F	Andrei Kovalenko	6 ft 0 in (183 cm)	227 lb (103 kg)	June 7, 1970 (aged 26)	(Canada) Edmonton Oilers
27	F	Alexei Kovalev	6 ft 2 in (188 cm)	223 lb (101 kg)	February 24, 1973 (aged 23)	(United States) New York Rangers
13	F	Vyacheslav Kozlov	5 ft 10 in (178 cm)	192 lb (87 kg)	May 3, 1972 (aged 24)	(United States) Detroit Red Wings
8	F	Igor Larionov (A)	5 ft 9 in (175 cm)	172 lb (78 kg)	December 3, 1960 (aged 35)	(United States) Detroit Red Wings
89	F	Alexander Mogilny	6 ft 0 in (183 cm)	209 lb (95 kg)	February 18, 1969 (aged 27)	(Canada) Vancouver Canucks
3	F	Sergei Nemchinov	5 ft 11 in (180 cm)	198 lb (90 kg)	January 14, 1964 (aged 32)	(United States) New York Rangers (Note: Traded to the Vancouver Canucks on March 8, 1997)
33	F	Andrei Nikolishin	6 ft 0 in (183 cm)	216 lb (98 kg)	March 25, 1973 (aged 23)	(United States) Hartford Whalers (Note: Traded to the Washington Capitals on November 6, 1996)
28	F	Alexander Semak	5 ft 9 in (175 cm)	183 lb (83 kg)	February 11, 1966 (aged 30)	(Canada) Vancouver Canucks (Note: Played 23 games for the Syracuse Crunch and 13 games for the Las Vegas Thunder, Vancouver's respective AHL and IHL affiliates)
19	F	Alexei Yashin	6 ft 4 in (193 cm)	227 lb (103 kg)	November 5, 1973 (aged 22)	(Canada) Ottawa Senators
16	F	Valeri Zelepukin	6 ft 0 in (183 cm)	207 lb (94 kg)	September 17, 1968 (aged 27)	(United States) New Jersey Devils
10	F	Alexei Zhamnov	6 ft 0 in (183 cm)	194 lb (88 kg)	October 1, 1970 (aged 25)	(United States) Chicago Blackhawks

Pavel Bure played in a couple preliminary games, but he suffered a bruised kidney during one of those games. He was forced to miss the main tournament as a result. His place in the line-up was taken by Valeri Zelepukin.

== Slovakia ==
Head coach: Jozef Golonka

Assistant coach: Vincent Lukáč, Dusan Ziska

No.	Pos.	Name	Height	Weight	Birthdate	1996-97 Team
30	G	Jaromir Dragan	6 ft 0 in (183 cm)	190 lb (86 kg)	September 14, 1963 (aged 33)	(Slovakia) HC Košice
35	G	Roman Mega	5 ft 9 in (175 cm)	159 lb (72 kg)	October 27, 1970 (aged 25)	(Slovakia) HC Slovan Bratislava
1	G	Igor Murín	5 ft 11 in (180 cm)	192 lb (87 kg)	March 1, 1973 (aged 23)	(Slovakia) HK Dukla Trenčín
2	D	Jerguš Bača	6 ft 1 in (185 cm)	214 lb (97 kg)	January 4, 1965 (aged 31)	(Slovakia) HC Košice (Note: Played 50 games for HC Olomouc)
29	D	Matej Bukna	5 ft 11 in (180 cm)	192 lb (87 kg)	August 21, 1970 (aged 26)	(Slovakia) HC Slovan Bratislava
3	D	Ivan Droppa	6 ft 3 in (191 cm)	216 lb (98 kg)	February 1, 1972 (aged 24)	(United States) Indianapolis Ice (Note: Traded to the Florida Panthers organization on December 18, 1996, and played 47 games for the Carolina Monarchs, Florida's AHL affiliate)
4	D	Stanislav Jasečko	6 ft 4 in (193 cm)	209 lb (95 kg)	December 5, 1972 (aged 23)	(United States) Grand Rapids Griffins
25	D	Stanislav Medřik	5 ft 11 in (180 cm)	183 lb (83 kg)	April 4, 1966 (aged 30)	(Czech Republic) HC Zlín (Note: Played three games for HC Dukla Trencin)
7	D	Ľubomír Sekeráš	6 ft 0 in (183 cm)	176 lb (80 kg)	November 18, 1968 (aged 27)	(Slovakia) HC Třinec
5	D	Marián Smerčiak	6 ft 0 in (183 cm)	192 lb (87 kg)	December 4, 1972 (aged 23)	(Slovakia) HK Dukla Trenčin
8	D	Róbert Švehla (A)	6 ft 0 in (183 cm)	207 lb (94 kg)	January 2, 1969 (aged 27)	(United States) Florida Panthers
27	D	Ján Varholík	6 ft 0 in (183 cm)	198 lb (90 kg)	February 28, 1970 (aged 26)	(Slovakia) HC Košice
6	D	Ľubomír Višňovský	5 ft 10 in (178 cm)	192 lb (87 kg)	August 11, 1976 (aged 20)	(Slovakia) HC Slovan Bratislava
19	F	Peter Bartoš	6 ft 0 in (183 cm)	185 lb (84 kg)	September 5, 1973 (aged 23)	(Slovakia) MHC Martin
12	F	Peter Bondra (C)	6 ft 1 in (185 cm)	201 lb (91 kg)	February 7, 1968 (aged 28)	(United States) Washington Capitals
20	F	Zdeno Ciger (A)	6 ft 1 in (185 cm)	190 lb (86 kg)	October 19, 1969 (aged 26)	(Slovakia) HC Slovan Bratislava
26	F	Pavol Demitra	6 ft 0 in (183 cm)	205 lb (93 kg)	November 9, 1974 (aged 21)	(United States) Las Vegas Thunder (Note: Played one game for HK Dukla Trenčín. Traded to the St. Louis Blues on November 27, 1996. Played eight games for the St. Louis and 42 games for the Grand Rapids Griffins, their IHL affiliate.)
10	F	Oto Haščák	6 ft 1 in (185 cm)	198 lb (90 kg)	January 31, 1964 (aged 32)	(Czech Republic) HC Vsetín
17	F	Slavomír Ilavský	5 ft 10 in (178 cm)	179 lb (81 kg)	May 11, 1969 (aged 27)	(Slovakia) HC Košice
28	F	Ľubomír Kolník	6 ft 1 in (185 cm)	194 lb (88 kg)	January 23, 1968 (aged 28)	(Slovakia) HC Slovan Bratislava
24	F	Žigmund Pálffy	5 ft 10 in (178 cm)	183 lb (83 kg)	May 5, 1972 (aged 24)	(United States) New York Islanders (Note: Played one game for HK Dukla Trenčín.)
9	F	Vlastimil Plavucha	6 ft 0 in (183 cm)	181 lb (82 kg)	November 6, 1968 (aged 27)	(Slovakia) HC Košice
23	F	Ľubomír Rybovič	6 ft 2 in (188 cm)	198 lb (90 kg)	February 18, 1972 (aged 24)	(United States) Grand Rapids Griffins
18	F	Miroslav Šatan	6 ft 2 in (188 cm)	194 lb (88 kg)	October 22, 1974 (aged 21)	(Canada) Edmonton Oilers (Note: Traded to the Buffalo Sabres on March 18, 1997)
15	F	Jozef Stümpel	6 ft 3 in (191 cm)	218 lb (99 kg)	July 20, 1972 (aged 24)	(United States) Boston Bruins
19	F	Jozef Voskár	5 ft 10 in (178 cm)	185 lb (84 kg)	September 25, 1971 (aged 24)	(Slovakia) HC Slovan Bratislava
22	F	Richard Zedník	6 ft 0 in (183 cm)	192 lb (87 kg)	January 6, 1976 (aged 20)	(United States) Washington Capitals (Note: Played 56 games for the Portland Pirates, Washington's AHL affiliate)

== Sweden ==
Head coach: Kent Forsberg

Assistant coach: (United States) Barry Smith

No.	Pos.	Name	Height	Weight	Birthdate	1996-97 Team
1	G	Johan Hedberg	6 ft 0 in (183 cm)	190 lb (86 kg)	May 5, 1973 (aged 23)	(Sweden) Leksands IF
35	G	Tommy Salo	6 ft 0 in (183 cm)	179 lb (81 kg)	February 1, 1971 (aged 25)	(United States) New York Islanders
30	G	Tommy Söderström	5 ft 9 in (175 cm)	165 lb (75 kg)	July 17, 1969 (aged 27)	(United States) New York Islanders (Note: Played two games for the Rochester Americans and 26 games for the Utah Grizzlies, the Islanders' respective AHL and IHL affiliates)
3	D	Tommy Albelin	6 ft 1 in (185 cm)	194 lb (88 kg)	May 21, 1964 (aged 32)	(Canada) Calgary Flames
6	D	Calle Johansson (C)	5 ft 11 in (180 cm)	203 lb (92 kg)	February 14, 1967 (aged 29)	(United States) Washington Capitals
31	D	Roger Johansson	6 ft 3 in (191 cm)	194 lb (88 kg)	September 17, 1967 (aged 28)	(Sweden) Färjestad BK
19	D	Kenny Jönsson	6 ft 3 in (191 cm)	207 lb (94 kg)	October 6, 1974 (aged 21)	(United States) New York Islanders
4	D	Nicklas Lidström (A)	6 ft 1 in (185 cm)	190 lb (86 kg)	April 28, 1970 (aged 26)	(United States) Detroit Red Wings
14	D	Mattias Norström	6 ft 1 in (185 cm)	223 lb (101 kg)	January 2, 1972 (aged 24)	(United States) Los Angeles Kings
36	D	Peter Popovic	6 ft 6 in (198 cm)	231 lb (105 kg)	February 10, 1968 (aged 28)	(Canada) Montreal Canadiens
27	D	Leif Rohlin	6 ft 1 in (185 cm)	212 lb (96 kg)	February 26, 1968 (aged 28)	(Canada) Vancouver Canucks
11	F	Daniel Alfredsson	6 ft 0 in (183 cm)	203 lb (92 kg)	December 11, 1972 (aged 23)	(Canada) Ottawa Senators
34	F	Mikael Andersson	5 ft 10 in (178 cm)	181 lb (82 kg)	May 10, 1966 (aged 30)	(United States) Tampa Bay Lightning
32	F	Niklas Andersson	5 ft 9 in (175 cm)	176 lb (80 kg)	May 20, 1971 (aged 25)	(United States) New York Islanders
18	F	Jonas Bergqvist	6 ft 0 in (183 cm)	203 lb (92 kg)	September 26, 1962 (aged 33)	(Sweden) Leksands IF
22	F	Ulf Dahlén	6 ft 2 in (188 cm)	198 lb (90 kg)	January 21, 1967 (aged 29)	(United States) San Jose Sharks (Note: Traded to the Chicago Blackhawks on January 25, 1997)
21	F	Peter Forsberg (A)	6 ft 1 in (185 cm)	205 lb (93 kg)	July 20, 1973 (aged 23)	(United States) Colorado Avalanche
29	F	Johan Garpenlöv	6 ft 0 in (183 cm)	185 lb (84 kg)	March 21, 1968 (aged 28)	(United States) Florida Panthers
38	F	Andreas Johansson	6 ft 0 in (183 cm)	205 lb (93 kg)	May 19, 1973 (aged 23)	(United States) New York Islanders (Note: Traded to the Pittsburgh Penguins on November 16, 1996. Played 10 games for the Cleveland Lumberjacks, Pittsburgh's IHL affiliate.)
5	F	Patrik Juhlin	6 ft 0 in (183 cm)	207 lb (94 kg)	April 24, 1970 (aged 26)	(United States) Philadelphia Phantoms
10	F	Fredrik Nilsson	6 ft 2 in (188 cm)	198 lb (90 kg)	April 16, 1971 (aged 25)	(Sweden) Luleå HF
92	F	Michael Nylander	5 ft 11 in (180 cm)	192 lb (87 kg)	October 3, 1972 (aged 23)	(Switzerland) HC Lugano
25	F	Markus Näslund	6 ft 0 in (183 cm)	196 lb (89 kg)	July 30, 1973 (aged 23)	(Canada) Vancouver Canucks
13	F	Mats Sundin (C)	6 ft 5 in (196 cm)	231 lb (105 kg)	February 13, 1971 (aged 25)	(Canada) Toronto Maple Leafs
24	F	Niklas Sundström	6 ft 0 in (183 cm)	194 lb (88 kg)	June 6, 1975 (aged 21)	(United States) New York Rangers

== United States ==
Head coach: Ron Wilson

Assistant coaches: Keith Allain, John Cunniff, Paul Holmgren

No.	Pos.	Name	Height	Weight	Birthdate	1996-97 Team
30	G	Jim Carey	6 ft 2 in (188 cm)	190 lb (86 kg)	May 31, 1974 (aged 22)	(United States) Washington Capitals (Note: Traded to the Boston Bruins on March 1, 1997)
31	G	Guy Hebert	5 ft 11 in (180 cm)	185 lb (84 kg)	January 7, 1967 (aged 29)	(United States) Mighty Ducks of Anaheim
35	G	Mike Richter	5 ft 11 in (180 cm)	185 lb (84 kg)	September 22, 1966 (aged 29)	(United States) New York Rangers
28	D	Shawn Chambers	6 ft 2 in (188 cm)	201 lb (91 kg)	October 11, 1966 (aged 29)	(United States) New Jersey Devils
7	D	Chris Chelios (A)	5 ft 11 in (180 cm)	191 lb (87 kg)	January 25, 1962 (aged 34)	(United States) Chicago Blackhawks
3	D	Derian Hatcher	6 ft 5 in (196 cm)	245 lb (111 kg)	June 4, 1972 (aged 24)	(United States) Dallas Stars
4	D	Kevin Hatcher	6 ft 3 in (191 cm)	231 lb (105 kg)	September 9, 1966 (aged 30)	(United States) Pittsburgh Penguins
6	D	Phil Housley	5 ft 10 in (178 cm)	179 lb (81 kg)	March 9, 1964 (aged 32)	(United States) Washington Capitals
2	D	Brian Leetch (C)	6 ft 1 in (185 cm)	187 lb (85 kg)	March 3, 1968 (aged 28)	(United States) New York Rangers
5	D	Mathieu Schneider	5 ft 11 in (180 cm)	192 lb (87 kg)	June 12, 1969 (aged 27)	(Canada) Toronto Maple Leafs
20	D	Gary Suter	6 ft 0 in (183 cm)	205 lb (93 kg)	June 24, 1964 (aged 32)	(United States) Chicago Blackhawks
11	F	Tony Amonte	6 ft 0 in (183 cm)	202 lb (92 kg)	August 2, 1970 (aged 26)	(United States) Chicago Blackhawks
18	F	Adam Deadmarsh	6 ft 0 in (183 cm)	205 lb (93 kg)	May 10, 1975 (aged 21)	(United States) Colorado Avalanche
12	F	Bill Guerin	6 ft 2 in (188 cm)	220 lb (100 kg)	November 9, 1970 (aged 25)	(United States) New Jersey Devils
15	F	Brett Hull	5 ft 11 in (180 cm)	201 lb (91 kg)	August 9, 1964 (aged 32)	(United States) St. Louis Blues
22	F	Steve Konowalchuk	6 ft 1 in (185 cm)	198 lb (90 kg)	November 11, 1972 (aged 23)	(United States) Washington Capitals
16	F	Pat LaFontaine	5 ft 10 in (178 cm)	181 lb (82 kg)	February 22, 1965 (aged 31)	(United States) Buffalo Sabres
10	F	John LeClair	6 ft 3 in (191 cm)	225 lb (102 kg)	July 5, 1969 (aged 27)	(United States) Philadelphia Flyers
14	F	Shawn McEachern	5 ft 11 in (180 cm)	201 lb (91 kg)	February 28, 1969 (aged 27)	(Canada) Ottawa Senators
9	F	Mike Modano	6 ft 3 in (191 cm)	210 lb (95 kg)	June 7, 1970 (aged 26)	(United States) Dallas Stars
29	F	Joel Otto	6 ft 5 in (196 cm)	220 lb (100 kg)	October 29, 1961 (aged 34)	(United States) Philadelphia Flyers
25	F	Brian Rolston	6 ft 2 in (188 cm)	214 lb (97 kg)	February 21, 1973 (aged 23)	(United States) New Jersey Devils
8	F	Bryan Smolinski	6 ft 1 in (185 cm)	203 lb (92 kg)	December 27, 1971 (aged 24)	(United States) Detroit Vipers (Note: Acquired by the New York Islanders on November 17, 1996)
17	F	Keith Tkachuk (A)	6 ft 2 in (188 cm)	235 lb (107 kg)	March 28, 1972 (aged 24)	(United States) Phoenix Coyotes
19	F	Doug Weight	5 ft 11 in (180 cm)	196 lb (89 kg)	January 21, 1971 (aged 25)	(Canada) Edmonton Oilers
21	F	Scott Young	6 ft 1 in (185 cm)	201 lb (91 kg)	October 1, 1967 (aged 28)	(United States) Colorado Avalanche
