= Ján Varholík =

Slovak ice hockey player

Personal information
- Nationality: Slovak
- Born: 28 February 1970 (age 55); Košice, Czechoslovakia

Sport
- Sport: Ice hockey

Ján Varholík (born 28 February 1970) is a Slovak ice hockey player. He competed in the men's tournaments at the 1994 Winter Olympics and the 1998 Winter Olympics.

== Career statistics ==
=== Regular season and playoffs ===
			Regular season					Playoffs
Season	Team	League	GP	G	A	Pts	PIM	GP	G	A	Pts	PIM
1988–89	TJ VSŽ Košice	TCH	14	0	1	1	8	9	2	0	2
1989–90	TJ VSŽ Košice	TCH	15	0	3	3		—	—	—	—	—
1990–91	HC VSŽ Košice	TCH	47	7	14	21	48	5	1	0	1	0
1991–92	HC VSŽ Košice	TCH	35	8	10	18		8	1	0	1
1992–93	HC Košice	TCH	45	15	5	20	73	—	—	—	—	—
1993–94	HC Košice	SVK	43	10	11	21	48	—	—	—	—	—
1994–95	HC Košice	SVK	33	12	8	20	48	9	2	2	4	12
1995–96	HC Košice	SVK	33	9	16	25	76	—	—	—	—	—
1996–97	HC Košice	SVK	49	16	33	49	50	—	—	—	—	—
1997–98	HC Košice	SVK	44	10	24	34	24	—	—	—	—	—
1998–99	HC VSŽ Košice	SVK	4	1	2	3	12	—	—	—	—	—
TCH totals			156	30	33	63	—	22	4	0	4	—
SVK totals			206	58	94	152	258	9	2	2	4	12

=== International ===
Year	Team	Event	GP	G	A	Pts	PIM
1988	Czechoslovakia	EJC
1989	Czechoslovakia	WJC	7	2	1	3	2
1990	Czechoslovakia	WJC	4	1	2	3	4
1994	Slovakia	OG	6	0	0	0	2
1994	Slovakia	WC C	6	3	2	5	2
1995	Slovakia	WC B	7	0	3	3	6
1996	Slovakia	WC	5	0	0	0	2
1996	Slovakia	WCH	3	0	1	1	2
1998	Slovakia	OG	4	0	0	0	14
Senior totals			31	3	6	9	28

"Jan Varholik". Elite Prospects.
