= 1982–83 Nationalliga A season =

Swiss professional ice hockey season

The 1982–83 Nationalliga A season was the 45th season of the Nationalliga A, the top level of ice hockey in Switzerland. Eight teams participated in the league, and EHC Biel won the championship.

== First round ==
| Pl. | Team | GP | W | T | L | GF–GA | Pts |
|---|---|---|---|---|---|---|---|
| 1. | HC Davos | 28 | 20 | 0 | 8 | 162:92 | 40 |
| 2. | EHC Biel | 28 | 18 | 2 | 8 | 153:105 | 38 |
| 3. | EHC Arosa | 28 | 17 | 2 | 9 | 133:116 | 36 |
| 4. | Fribourg-Gottéron | 28 | 16 | 3 | 9 | 119:95 | 35 |
| 5. | SC Langnau | 28 | 10 | 3 | 15 | 115:146 | 23 |
| 6. | HC Lugano | 28 | 10 | 2 | 16 | 126:145 | 22 |
| 7. | EHC Kloten | 28 | 8 | 3 | 17 | 118:146 | 19 |
| 8. | HC Ambrì-Piotta | 28 | 4 | 3 | 21 | 94:170 | 11 |

== Final round ==
| Pl. | Team | GP | W | T | L | GF–GA | Pts |
|---|---|---|---|---|---|---|---|
| 1. | EHC Biel | 10 | 9 | 0 | 1 | 206:140 | 37(19) |
| 2. | Fribourg-Gottéron | 10 | 5 | 3 | 2 | 170:128 | 31(18) |
| 3. | HC Davos | 10 | 3 | 2 | 5 | 225:150 | 28(20) |
| 4. | EHC Arosa | 10 | 4 | 2 | 4 | 179:157 | 28(18) |
| 5. | SC Langnau | 10 | 2 | 2 | 6 | 151:201 | 18(12) |
| 6. | HC Lugano | 10 | 2 | 1 | 7 | 162:213 | 16(11) |

== Relegation ==
| Pl. | Team | GP | W | T | L | GF–GA | Pts |
|---|---|---|---|---|---|---|---|
| 1. | EHC Kloten | 10 | 9 | 0 | 1 | 72:29 | 18 |
| 2. | Zürcher SC | 10 | 6 | 0 | 4 | 37:43 | 12 |
| 3. | EHC Olten | 10 | 3 | 2 | 5 | 53:57 | 8 |
| 4. | HC Sierre | 10 | 3 | 2 | 5 | 34:49 | 8 |
| 5. | HC Ambrì-Piotta | 10 | 3 | 1 | 6 | 39:45 | 7 |
| 6. | Lausanne HC | 10 | 3 | 1 | 6 | 43:55 | 7 |
