= 1983–84 Nationalliga A season =

Swiss professional ice hockey season

The 1983–84 Nationalliga A season was the 46th season of the Nationalliga A, the top level of ice hockey in Switzerland. Eight teams participated in the league, and HC Davos won the championship.

== First round ==
Pl.	Team	GP	W	T	L	GF–GA	Pts
1.	HC Davos	14	12	2	0	81:29	26
2.	EHC Arosa	14	7	3	4	64:42	17
3.	Fribourg-Gottéron	14	7	1	6	64:70	15
4.	HC Lugano	14	7	0	7	59:58	14
5.	EHC Kloten	14	6	0	8	58:67	12
6.	EHC Biel	14	5	1	8	64:74	11
7.	SC Langnau	14	4	2	8	36:55	10
8.	Zürcher SC	14	3	1	10	47:78	7

== Second round ==
=== 1st-4th place ===
Pl.	Team	GP	W	T	L	GF–GA	Pts
1.	HC Davos	6	3	1	2	23:23	33
2.	EHC Arosa	6	2	3	1	26:14	24
3.	Fribourg-Gottéron	6	2	2	2	21:19	21
4.	HC Lugano	6	1	2	3	13:27	18

=== 5th-8th place ===
Pl.	Team	GP	W	T	L	GF–GA	Pts
5.	EHC Kloten	6	4	0	2	26:20	20
6.	EHC Biel	6	3	0	3	28:27	17
7.	SC Langnau	6	3	0	3	29:30	16
8.	Zürcher SC	6	2	0	4	21:27	11

== Third round ==
Pl.	Team	GP	W	T	L	GF–GA	Pts
1.	HC Davos	14	10	2	2	80:52	55
2.	EHC Arosa	14	7	1	6	75:56	39
3.	Fribourg-Gottéron	14	7	2	5	58:55	37
4.	HC Lugano	14	7	3	4	62:52	35
5.	EHC Biel	14	6	4	4	68:63	33
6.	SC Langnau	14	6	3	5	57:60	31
7.	EHC Kloten	14	2	2	10	57:84	26
8.	Zürcher SC	14	1	3	10	42:77	16

== Final round ==
=== 1st-4th place ===
Pl.	Team	GP	W	T	L	GF–GA	Pts
1.	HC Davos	6	3	1	2	36:27	61
2.	EHC Arosa	6	2	2	2	35:34	45
3.	Fribourg-Gottéron	6	2	2	2	26:35	44
4.	HC Lugano	6	2	1	3	29:30	40

=== Relegation ===
Pl.	Team	GP	W	T	L	GF–GA	Pts
5.	EHC Biel	6	3	0	3	38:36	39
6.	SC Langnau	6	4	0	2	36:18	39
7.	EHC Kloten	6	3	0	3	30:37	32
8.	Zürcher SC	6	2	0	4	31:44	20
