= 1988–89 Nationalliga A season =

Swiss professional ice hockey season

The 1988–89 NLA season was the 51st regular season of the Nationalliga A, the main professional ice hockey league in Switzerland.

== Regular season ==
=== Final standings ===
	Team	GP	W	L	T	GF	GA	Pts
1.	HC Lugano	36	29	4	3	200	97	61
2.	EHC Kloten	36	26	6	4	218	128	56
3.	SC Bern	36	24	8	4	190	106	52
4.	HC Ambri-Piotta	36	21	10	5	178	122	47
5.	EV Zug	36	17	16	3	184	171	37
6.	EHC Biel	36	16	17	3	161	165	35
7.	EHC Olten	36	9	23	4	125	169	22
8.	HC Fribourg-Gottéron	36	9	26	1	120	246	19
9.	HC Davos	36	6	25	5	120	187	17
10.	HC Ajoie	36	5	27	4	97	202	14

=== Scoring leaders ===
Note: G = Goals; A = Assists; Pts = Points

Player	Team	G	A	Pts
Don Laurence	EV Zug	46	27	73
Normand Dupont	EHC Biel	37	35	72
Dale McCourt	HC Ambri-Piotta	43	25	68
Ross Yates	EHC Kloten	34	32	66
Felix Hollenstein	EHC Kloten	28	36	64
Corey Millen	HC Ambri-Piotta	32	29	61
Kent Johansson	HC Lugano	25	33	58
Peter Schlagenhauf	EHC Kloten	29	28	57
Jean-François Sauvé	HC Fribourg-Gottéron	23	33	56
Chris Kontos	EHC Kloten	33	22	55

== Playoffs ==
=== Quarterfinals ===
HC Lugano (1) vs. Fribourg-Gottéron (8)
Away	Home
Fribourg-Gottéron 2	10 HC Lugano
HC Lugano 5	1 Fribourg-Gottéron
HC Lugano wins series 2–0

SC Bern (3) vs. EHC Biel (6)
Away	Home
EHC Biel 1	4 SC Bern
SC Bern 5	2 EHC Biel
SC Bern wins series 2–0

EHC Kloten (2) vs. EHC Olten (7)
Away	Home	
EHC Olten 5	9 EHC Kloten	
EHC Kloten 6	5 EHC Olten	OT
EHC Kloten wins series 2–0

HC Ambri-Piotta (4) vs. EV Zug (5)
Away	Home
EV Zug 1	4 HC Ambri-Piotta
HC Ambri-Piotta 5	6 EV Zug
EV Zug 2	4 HC Ambri-Piotta
HC Ambri-Piotta wins series 2–1

=== Semifinals ===
HC Lugano vs. HC Ambri-Piotta
Away	Home
HC Ambri-Piotta 1	6 HC Lugano
HC Lugano 5	2 HC Ambri-Piotta
HC Ambri-Piotta 2	6 HC Lugano
HC Lugano wins series 3–0

EHC Kloten vs. SC Bern
Away	Home
SC Bern 2	5 EHC Kloten
EHC Kloten 2	6 SC Bern
SC Bern 6	3 EHC Kloten
EHC Kloten 1	4 SC Bern
SC Bern wins series 3–1

=== Finals ===
HC Lugano vs. SC Bern
Away	Home
SC Bern 2	6 HC Lugano
HC Lugano 1	5 SC Bern
SC Bern 4	3 HC Lugano
HC Lugano 5	1 SC Bern
SC Bern 4	2 HC Lugano
SC Bern wins series 3–2

=== Scoring leaders ===
Note: G = Goals; A = Assists; Pts = Points

Player	Team	G	A	Pts
Kent Johansson	HC Lugano	7	10	17
Andy Ton	HC Lugano	9	7	16
Jörg Eberle	HC Lugano	5	7	12
Reijo Ruotsalainen	SC Bern	4	8	12
Thomas Vrabec	HC Lugano	8	3	11
