= 1990–91 Nationalliga A season =

Swiss professional ice hockey season

The 1990–91 NLA season was the 53rd regular season of the Nationalliga A, the main professional ice hockey league in Switzerland.

== Regular season ==
=== Final standings ===
	Team	GP	W	L	T	GF	GA	Pts
1.	SC Bern	36	28	2	6	177	81	62
2.	HC Lugano	36	26	6	4	172	94	56
3.	EHC Kloten	36	22	11	3	180	128	47
4.	HC Fribourg-Gottéron	36	19	15	2	167	147	40
5.	HC Ambri-Piotta	36	15	19	2	155	175	32
6.	Zürcher SC	36	12	19	5	138	165	29
7.	EHC Biel	36	10	18	8	151	173	28
8.	EV Zug	36	10	18	5	136	179	25
9.	HC Sierre	36	9	21	6	133	189	24
10.	EHC Olten	36	8	27	1	111	189	17

=== Scoring leaders ===
Note: G = Goals; A = Assists; Pts = Points

Player	Team	G	A	Pts
Vyacheslav Bykov	HC Fribourg-Gottéron	32	51	83
Andrei Khomutov	HC Fribourg-Gottéron	42	39	81
Kent Nilsson	EHC Kloten	36	38	74
Peter Jaks	HC Ambri-Piotta	35	34	69
Mike Bullard	HC Ambri-Piotta	37	30	67
Mats Näslund	HC Lugano	27	28	55
Kelly Glowa	HC Sierre	33	18	51
Mike Richard	Zürcher SC	28	23	51
Normand Dupont	EHC Biel	23	26	49
Jörg Eberle	HC Lugano	28	17	45

== Playoffs ==
=== Quarterfinals ===
SC Bern (1) vs. EV Zug (8)
Away	Home
EV Zug 1	4 SC Bern
SC Bern 4	2 EV Zug
EV Zug 2	7 SC Bern
SC Bern wins series 3–0

EHC Kloten (3) vs. Zürcher SC (6)
Away	Home
Zürcher SC 0	7 EHC Kloten
EHC Kloten 4	6 Zürcher SC
Zürcher SC 3	9 EHC Kloten
EHC Kloten 7	6 Zürcher SC
EHC Kloten wins series 3–1

HC Lugano (2) vs. EHC Biel (7)
Away	Home
EHC Biel 3	4 HC Lugano
HC Lugano 3	1 EHC Biel
EHC Biel 3	4 HC Lugano
HC Lugano wins series 3–0

Fribourg-Gottéron (4) vs. HC Ambri-Piotta (5)
Away	Home
HC Ambri-Piotta 6	5 Fribourg-Gottéron
Fribourg-Gottéron 4	7 HC Ambri-Piotta
HC Ambri-Piotta 2	10 Fribourg-Gottéron
Fribourg-Gottéron 9	8 HC Ambri-Piotta
HC Ambri-Piotta 2	7 Fribourg-Gottéron
Fribourg-Gottéron wins series 3–2

=== Semifinals ===
SC Bern vs. Fribourg-Gottéron
Away	Home
Fribourg-Gottéron 2	5 SC Bern
SC Bern 5	2 Fribourg-Gottéron
Fribourg-Gottéron 5	6 SC Bern
SC Bern wins series 3–0

HC Lugano vs. EHC Kloten
Away	Home	
EHC Kloten 1	5 HC Lugano	
HC Lugano 2	3 EHC Kloten	OT
EHC Kloten 3	6 HC Lugano	
HC Lugano 7	6 EHC Kloten	OT
HC Lugano wins series 3–1

=== Finals ===
SC Bern vs. HC Lugano
Away	Home	
HC Lugano 2	3 SC Bern	
SC Bern 4	3 HC Lugano	OT
HC Lugano 4	2 SC Bern	
SC Bern 2	1 HC Lugano	OT
SC Bern wins series 3–1

=== Scoring leaders ===
Note: G = Goals; A = Assists; Pts = Points

Player	Team	G	A	Pts
Andrei Khomutov	HC Fribourg-Gottéron	13	12	25
Vyacheslav Bykov	HC Fribourg-Gottéron	8	14	22
Patrick Howald	SC Bern	7	6	13
Reijo Ruotsalainen	SC Bern	5	8	13
Alfred Lüthi	HC Lugano	6	6	12
