= 1993–94 Nationalliga A season =

Swiss professional ice hockey season

The 1993–94 Nationalliga A season was the 56th season of the Nationalliga A, the top level of ice hockey in Switzerland. 10 teams participated in the league, and EHC Kloten won the championship.

== Regular season ==
Pl.	Team	GP	W	T	L	GF–GA	Pts.
1.	HC Fribourg-Gottéron	36	29	3	4	193 : 83	61
2.	EHC Kloten	36	21	8	7	137 : 90	50
3.	HC Lugano	36	19	5	12	129 : 102	43
4.	EV Zug	36	19	3	14	152 : 135	41
5.	SC Bern	36	18	4	14	140 : 108	40
6.	HC Ambrì-Piotta	36	17	2	17	137 : 142	36
7.	HC Davos	36	12	3	21	97 : 136	27
8.	Zürcher SC	36	9	6	21	125 : 149	24
9.	EHC Olten	36	8	4	24	96 : 176	20
10.	EHC Biel	36	8	2	26	83 : 170	18

== Playoffs ==
=== Quarterfinals ===
==== HC Fribourg-Gottéron - Zürcher SC 3:0 ====
- Game 1: HCFG-ZSC 8:2 (1:1;3:0;4:1)
- Game 2: ZSC-HCFG 5:6 (3:3;0:2;2:1)
- Game 3: HCFG-ZSC 10:1 (4:0;4:0;2:1)

==== EV Zug - SC Bern 3:2 ====
- Game 1: EVZ-SCB 4:3 (0:2;0:0;4:1)
- Game 2: SCB-EVZ 5:0 (0:0;3:0;2:0)
- Game 3: EVZ-SCB 4:2 (3:1;0:0;1:1)
- Game 4: SCB-EVZ 8:0 (2:0;3:0;3:0)
- Game 5: EVZ-SCB 2:1 n.V. (1:1;0:0;0:0;1:0)

==== HC Lugano - HC Ambrì-Piotta 3:2 ====
- Game 1: HCL-HCAP 2:3 (1:3;1:0;0:0)
- Game 2: HCAP-HCL 1:4 (1:1;0:1;0:2)
- Game 3: HCL-HCAP 6:3 (3:1;1:1;2:1)
- Game 4: HCAP-HCL 3:1 n.P. (0:0;1:1;0:0)
- Game 5: HCL-HCAP 4:1 (2:0;1:1;1:0)

==== EHC Kloten - HC Davos 3:1 ====
- Game 1: EHCK-HCD 2:3 (0:1;0:2;2:0)
- Game 2: HCD-EHCK 0:5 (0:1;0:2;0:2)
- Game 3: EHCK-HCD 7:1 (3:0;2:1;2:0)
- Game 4: HCD-EHCK 4:5 (1:1;3:1;0:3)

=== Semifinals ===
==== HC Fribourg-Gottéron - EV Zug 3:1 ====
- Game 1: HCFG-EVZ 7:5 (2:0;3:3;2:2)
- Game 2: EVZ-HCFG 5:4
- Game 3: HCFG-EVZ 9:3 (2:0;3:2;4:1)
- Game 4: EVZ-HCFG 3:7 (0:1;2:2;1:4)

==== EHC Kloten - HC Lugano 3:1 ====
- Game 1: EHCK-HCL 5:3 (3:1;0:1;2:1)
- Game 2: HCL-EHCK 5:2 (2:0;2:1;1:1)
- Game 3: EHCK-HCL 2:0 (0:0;1:0;1:0)
- Game 4: HCL-EHCK 2:5 (1:1;0:1;1:3)

=== Final ===
==== HC Fribourg-Gottéron - EHC Kloten 1:3 ====
- Game 1: HCFG-EHCK 4:5 (1:2;2:1;1:2)
- Game 2: EHCK-HCFG 1:4 (0:1;1:0;0:3)
- Game 3: HCFG-EHCK 2:4 (0:2;2:1;0:1)
- Game 4: EHCK-HCFG 6:4 (1:2;1:2;4:0)

== Relegation ==
- EHC Olten - EHC Biel 2:3 on series

EHC Olten is relegated to the Nationalliga B.
