= 1992–93 Nationalliga A season =

Swiss professional ice hockey season

The 1992–93 Nationalliga A season was the 55th season of the Nationalliga A, the top level of ice hockey in Switzerland. 10 teams participated in the league, and EHC Kloten won the championship.

== Regular season ==
Pl.	Team	GP	W	T	L	GF–GA	Pts.
1.	EHC Kloten	36	27	1	8	173 : 91	55
2.	HC Fribourg-Gottéron	36	25	4	7	171 : 100	54
3.	SC Bern	36	21	4	11	160 : 123	46
4.	HC Lugano	36	21	1	14	131 : 116	43
5.	EV Zug	36	19	3	14	144 : 117	41
6.	HC Ambrì-Piotta	36	17	4	15	130 : 125	38
7.	Zürcher SC	36	12	3	21	112 : 141	27
8.	EHC Biel	36	12	3	21	121 : 167	27
9.	HC Ajoie	36	9	1	26	103 : 178	19
10.	EHC Chur	36	5	0	31	109 : 196	10

== Playoffs ==
=== Quarterfinals ===
==== EHC Kloten - EHC Biel 4:0 ====
- Game 1: EHCK-EHCB 8:1
- Game 2: EHCB-EHCK 1:4
- Game 3: EHCK-EHCB 6:2
- Game 4: EHCB-EHCK 2:4

==== HC Lugano - EV Zug 4:1 ====
- Game 1: HCL-EVZ 3:2
- Game 2: EVZ-HCL 0:3
- Game 3: HCL-EVZ 2:1
- Game 4: EVZ-HCL 4:2
- Game 5: HCL-EVZ 4:0

==== SC Bern - HC Ambrì-Piotta 1:4 ====
- Game 1: SCB-HCAP 3:4
- Game 2: HCAP-SCB 5:1
- Game 3: SCB-HCAP 4:2
- Game 4: HCAP-SCB 3:2
- Game 5: SCB-HCAP 2:3

==== HC Fribourg-Gottéron - Zürcher SC 4:0 ====
- Game 1: HCFG-ZSC 4:3
- Game 2: ZSC-HCFG 3:4
- Game 3: HCFG-ZSC 8:4
- Game 4: ZSC-HCFG 4:6

=== Semifinals ===
==== EHC Kloten - HC Lugano 3:1 ====
- Game 1: EHCK-HCL 1:3
- Game 2: HCL-EHCK 1:2 SO
- Game 3: EHCK-HCL 5:1
- Game 4: HCL-EHCK 2:4

==== HC Fribourg-Gottéron - HC Ambrì-Piotta 3:1 ====
- Game 1: HCFG-HCAP 9:2
- Game 2: HCAP-HCFG 2:6
- Game 3: HCFG-HCAP 1:2
- Game 4: HCAP-HCFG 2:4

=== Final ===
==== EHC Kloten - HC Fribourg-Gottéron 3:0 ====
- Game 1: EHCK-HCFG 4:2
- Game 2: HCFG-EHCK 4:7
- Game 3: EHCK-HCFG 4:2

== Relegation ==
=== Round 1 ===
==== HC Davos - EHC Bülach 4:0 ====
- Game 1: HCD-EHCB 6:5
- Game 2: EHCB-HCD 1:8
- Game 3: HCD-EHCB 9:0
- Game 4: EHCB-HCD 1:3

==== EHC Chur - HC Martigny 4:1 ====
- Game 1: EHCC-HCM 5:0
- Game 2: HCM-EHCC 7:5
- Game 3: EHCC-HCM 4:1
- Game 4: HCM-EHCC 4:8
- Game 5: EHCC-HCM 7:2

==== EHC Olten - SC Herisau 4:0 ====
- Game 1: EHCO-SCH 5:4
- Game 2: SCH-EHCO 2:3
- Game 3: EHCO-SCH 4:1
- Game 4: SCH-EHCO 3:4

==== HC Ajoie - SC Rapperswil-Jona 0:4 ====
- Game 1: HCA-SCRJ 4:6
- Game 2: SCRJ-HCA 5:2
- Game 3: HCA-SCRJ 3:4
- Game 4: SCRJ-HCA 6:2

=== Round 2 ===
==== HC Davos - EHC Chur 3:0 ====
- Game 1: HCD-EHCC 4:0
- Game 2: EHCC-HCD 3:4
- Game 3: HCD-EHCC 4:3

==== EHC Olten - SC Rapperswil-Jona 3:0 ====
- Game 1: EHCO-SCRJ 4:3
- Game 2: SCRJ-EHCO 3:4
- Game 3: EHCO-SCRJ 8:4

HC Davos and EHC Olten were promoted to the Nationalliga A. HC Ajoie and EHC Chur were relegated to the Nationalliga B.
