= 1984–85 Nationalliga A season =

Swiss professional ice hockey season

The 1984–85 Nationalliga A season was the 47th season of the Nationalliga A, the top level of ice hockey in Switzerland. Eight teams participated in the league, and HC Davos won the championship.

== First round ==
Pl.	Team	GP	W	T	L	GF–GA	Pts
1.	HC Davos	28	20	1	7	168:111	41
2.	EHC Arosa	28	16	6	6	139:104	38
3.	HC Lugano	28	16	4	8	135:108	36
4.	Fribourg-Gottéron	28	15	1	12	113:115	31
5.	EHC Kloten	28	14	2	12	130:103	30
6.	EHC Biel	28	11	4	13	115:117	26
7.	SC Langnau	28	6	3	19	92:146	15
8.	EHC Chur	28	3	1	24	87:175	7

== Final round ==
Pl.	Team	GP	W	T	L	GF–GA	Pts
1.	HC Davos	10	9	1	0	247:146	40(21)
2.	HC Lugano	10	8	0	2	185:139	34(18)
3.	EHC Arosa	10	4	0	6	177:155	27(19)
4.	Fribourg-Gottéron	10	3	0	7	144:182	22(16)
5.	EHC Kloten	10	3	0	7	184:152	21(15)
6.	EHC Biel	10	2	1	7	156:177	18(13)

== Relegation ==
Pl.	Team	GP	W	T	L	GF–GA	Pts
1.	Zürcher SC	14	10	1	3	81:52	21
2.	HC Ambrì-Piotta	14	10	0	4	98:51	20
3.	HC Sierre	14	8	3	3	70:54	19
4.	EHC Olten	14	7	1	6	55:60	15
5.	SC Langnau	14	6	1	7	49:53	13
6.	EV Zug	14	5	1	8	48:84	11
7.	SC Bern	14	4	0	10	51:70	8
8.	EHC Chur	14	2	1	11	46:74	5
