= 1985–86 Nationalliga A season =

Swiss professional ice hockey season

The 1985–86 Nationalliga A season was the 48th season of the Nationalliga A, the top level of ice hockey in Switzerland. 10 teams participated in the league, and HC Lugano won the championship.

== Regular season ==
Pl.	Team	GP	W	T	L	GF–GA	Pts
1.	HC Lugano	36	27	4	5	204 : 108	58
2.	HC Davos	36	24	5	7	202 : 129	53
3.	EHC Kloten	36	19	3	14	214 : 140	41
4.	HC Sierre	36	16	5	15	155 : 167	37
5.	EHC Biel	36	14	5	17	181 : 199	33
6.	HC Fribourg-Gottéron	36	14	3	19	157 : 190	31
7.	HC Ambrì-Piotta	36	11	7	18	161 : 190	29
8.	EHC Arosa	36	12	5	19	166 : 191	29
9.	EHC Olten	36	12	2	22	132 : 215	26
10.	Zürcher SC	36	11	1	23	136 : 179	23

== Playoffs ==
=== Semifinals ===
- HC Lugano – HC Sierre 7:2 7:3
- HC Davos – EHC Kloten 4:2, 5:8, 8:1

=== 3rd place ===
- EHC Kloten – HC Sierre 9:1, 4:4

=== Finale ===
- HC Lugano – HC Davos 5:0 (0:0,2:0,3:0)
- HC Davos – HC Lugano 5:7
