= 1986–87 Nationalliga A season =

Swiss professional ice hockey season

The 1986–87 Nationalliga A season was the 49th season of the Nationalliga A, the top level of ice hockey in Switzerland. 10 teams participated in the league, and HC Lugano won the championship.

== Regular season ==
Pl.	Team	GP	W	T	L	GF–GA	Pts
1.	HC Lugano	36	24	3	9	198:125	51
2.	EHC Kloten	36	22	5	9	194:126	49
3.	HC Davos	36	21	3	12	165:132	45
4.	HC Ambrì-Piotta	36	19	5	12	207:167	43
5.	SC Bern	36	16	5	15	188:178	37
6.	EHC Biel	36	17	2	17	156:194	36
7.	Fribourg-Gottéron	36	13	4	19	170:205	30
8.	HC Sierre	36	13	3	20	155:185	29
9.	EHC Chur	36	10	2	24	139:170	22
10.	EHC Olten	36	8	2	26	119:209	18

== Playoffs ==
=== Semifinals ===
- HC Lugano - HC Ambrì-Piotta 3:0 (5:4, 4:1, 7:1)
- EHC Kloten - HC Davos 3:2 (3:7, 2:5, 3:2, 5:1, 7:4)

=== 3rd place ===
- HC Davos - HC Ambrì-Piotta 8:6/3:7

=== Final ===
- HC Lugano - EHC Kloten 3:0 (6:2, 3:1, 4:0)
