= 1987–88 Nationalliga A season =

Swiss professional ice hockey season

The 1987–88 Nationalliga A season was the 50th season of the Nationalliga A, the top level of ice hockey in Switzerland. 10 teams participated in the league, and HC Lugano won the championship.

== First round ==
Pl.	Team	GP	W	T	L	GF–GA	Pts.
1.	HC Lugano	36	27	4	5	209:108	58
2	EHC Kloten	36	25	4	7	210:114	54
3	HC Ambrì-Piotta	36	22	5	9	184:133	49
4	HC Davos	36	19	5	12	173:140	43
5	EHC Biel	36	17	5	14	157:140	39
6	EV Zug	36	13	5	18	136:178	31
7	SC Bern	36	12	4	20	130:148	28
8	Fribourg-Gottéron	36	11	3	22	152:200	25
9	SC Langnau	36	9	4	23	163:235	22
10	HC Siders	36	4	3	29	108:226	11

== Playoffs ==
=== Semifinals ===
- HC Lugano - HC Davos 10:1, 3:4 OT, 8:1, 4:3 OT
- EHC Kloten - HC Ambrì-Piotta 7:4, 8:3, 2:5, 6:5

=== 3rd place ===
Best of Three

- HC Ambrì-Piotta - HC Davos 8:1, 9:3

=== Final ===
- HC Lugano - EHC Kloten 5:3, 10:4, 4:3
