= Unified Team at the 1992 Winter Olympics =

- The team competed under the Olympic flag
- IOC code: EUN

in Albertville, France
- Competitors: 129 (86 men, 43 women) in 12 sports
- Flag bearer: Valeriy Medvedtsev (biathlon)
- Medals Ranked 2nd: Gold 9 Silver 6 Bronze 8 Total 23

Winter Olympics appearances (overview)
- 1992

Other related appearances
- Latvia (1924–1936, 1992–pres.); Estonia (1928–1936, 1992–pres.); Lithuania (1928, 1992–pres.); Soviet Union (1956–1988); Armenia (1994–pres.); Belarus (1994–2022); Georgia (1994–pres.); Kazakhstan (1994–pres.); Kyrgyzstan (1994–pres.); Moldova (1994–pres.); Russia (1994–2014); Ukraine (1994–pres.); Uzbekistan (1994–pres.); Azerbaijan (1998–pres.); Tajikistan (2002–pres.); Olympic Athletes from Russia (2018); ROC (2022); Individual Neutral Athletes (2026)

The Unified Team at the 1992 Winter Olympics (Russian: Объединенная команда на Зимних Олимпийских играх 1992) in Albertville was a joint team consisting of five of the fifteen former Soviet republics: Russia, Ukraine, Kazakhstan, Belarus and Uzbekistan that made a decision to collaborate and created a united team. The Unified Team's only other appearance was at the 1992 Summer Olympics in Barcelona. It competed under the IOC country code EUN (from the French Equipe Unifiée).

The team finished second in the medal rankings, narrowly losing to a re-unified Germany.

== Members ==
- Belarus
- Kazakhstan
- Russia
- Ukraine
- Uzbekistan

== Medals by winter sport ==
Sport	Gold	Silver	Bronze	Total
Cross-country skiing	3	2	4	9
Figure skating	3	1	1	5
Biathlon	2	2	2	6
Ice hockey	1	0	0	1
Freestyle skiing	0	1	0	1
Short track speed skating	0	0	1	1
Totals (6 entries)	9	6	8	23

== Medalists ==
The Unified Team finished second to Germany both in the gold and overall medal tally with 9 gold medals, 6 silver medals, and 8 bronze medals for a total of 23 medals.

Medal	Name	Nationality	Sport	Event
Gold	Yevgeniy Redkin	Belarus	Biathlon	Men's 20 km
Gold	Anfisa Reztsova	Russia	Biathlon	Women's 7.5 km sprint
Gold	Lyubov Yegorova	Russia	Cross-country skiing	Women's 10 km pursuit (freestyle)
Gold	Lyubov Yegorova	Russia	Cross-country skiing	Women's 15 km (classical)
Gold	Yelena Välbe; Raisa Smetanina; Larisa Lazutina; Lyubov Yegorova	Russia (all)	Cross-country skiing	Women's 4 × 5 km relay
Gold	Viktor Petrenko	Ukraine	Figure skating	Men's singles
Gold	Natalia Mishkutenok; Artur Dmitriev	Russia	Figure skating	Pairs
Gold	Marina Klimova; Sergei Ponomarenko	Russia	Figure skating	Ice dancing
Gold	Unified team men's national ice hockey team: Sergei Bautin; Igor Boldin; Nikolai Borschevskiy; Vyacheslav Butsayev; Vyacheslav Bykov; Evgeny Davydov; Darius Kasparaitis (Lithuania); Nikolai Khabibulin; Yuri Khmylev; Andrei Khomutov; Andrei Kovalenko; Alexei Kovalev; Igor Kravchuk; Vladimir Malakhov; Dmitri Mironov; Sergei Petrenko; Vitali Prokhorov; Mikhail Shtalenkov; Andrei Trefilov; Dmitri Yushkevich; Alexei Zhamnov; Alexei Zhitnik (Ukraine); Sergei Zubov	Russia (all except Kasparaitis and Zhitnik)	Ice hockey	Men's competition
Silver	Svetlana Petcherskaia	Russia	Biathlon	Women's 15 km
Silver	Valeriy Medvedtsev; Alexandr Popov; Valeri Kiriyenko; Sergei Tchepikov	Russia (Medvedtsev, Kiriyenko and Tchepikov); Belarus (Popov)	Biathlon	Men's 4 × 7.5 km relay
Silver	Lyubov Yegorova	Russia	Cross-country skiing	Women's 5 km (classical)
Silver	Lyubov Yegorova	Russia	Cross-country skiing	Women's 30 km (freestyle)
Silver	Elena Bechke; Denis Petrov	Russia (both)	Figure skating	Pairs
Silver	Yelizaveta Kozhevnikova	Russia	Freestyle skiing	Women's moguls
Bronze	Yelena Belova	Russia	Biathlon	Women's 7.5 km sprint
Bronze	Yelena Belova; Anfisa Reztsova; Yelena Melnikova	Russia (all)	Biathlon	Women's 3 × 7.5 km relay
Bronze	Yelena Välbe	Russia	Cross-country skiing	Women's 5 km (classical)
Bronze	Yelena Välbe	Russia	Cross-country skiing	Women's 10 km pursuit (freestyle)
Bronze	Yelena Välbe	Russia	Cross-country skiing	Women's 15 km (classical)
Bronze	Yelena Välbe	Russia	Cross-country skiing	Women's 30 km (freestyle)
Bronze	Maya Usova; Alexander Zhulin	Russia (both)	Figure skating	Ice dancing
Bronze	Yuliya Allagulova; Natalya Isakova; Viktoriya Troytskaya; Yuliya Vlasova	Russia (all)	Short track speed skating	Women's 3000 m relay

== Competitors ==
The following is the list of number of competitors in the Games.

Sport	Men	Women	Total
Alpine skiing	3	4	7
Biathlon	5	6	11
Bobsleigh	9	–	9
Cross-country skiing	6	6	12
Figure skating	9	8	17
Freestyle skiing	4	4	8
Ice hockey	22	–	22
Luge	7	3	10
Nordic combined	4	–	4
Short track speed skating	1	5	6
Ski jumping	4	–	4
Speed skating	12	7	19
Total	86	43	129

== Alpine skiing ==
Men

Athlete	Event	Race 1	Race 2	Total	
Athlete	Event	Time	Time	Time	Rank
(Russia) Konstantin Chistyakov	Downhill			1:53.93	24
(Russia) Aleksey Maslov	Downhill			1:53.68	22
(Russia) Vitaly Andreyev	Downhill			1:53.52	21
(Russia) Vitaly Andreyev	Super-G			DNF	–
(Russia) Aleksey Maslov	Super-G			1:19.71	49
(Russia) Konstantin Chistyakov	Super-G			1:16.14	22

Men's combined

Athlete	Downhill	Slalom		Total	
Athlete	Time	Time 1	Time 2	Points	Rank
(Russia) Aleksey Maslov	1:48.53	DNF	–	DNF	–
(Russia) Konstantin Chistyakov	1:47.95	DNF	–	DNF	–
(Russia) Vitaly Andreyev	1:46.01	55.80	58.44	85.07	20

Women

Athlete	Event	Race 1	Race 2	Total	
Athlete	Event	Time	Time	Time	Rank
(Russia) Svetlana Novikova	Downhill			1:59.18	27
(Ukraine) Tetiana Lebedeva	Downhill			1:55.15	19
(Russia) Svetlana Gladysheva	Downhill			1:53.85	8
(Ukraine) Tetiana Lebedeva	Super-G			1:26.92	28
(Russia) Svetlana Gladysheva	Super-G			1:26.51	25
(Russia) Varvara Zelenskaya	Super-G			1:26.39	24

Women's combined

Athlete	Downhill	Slalom		Total	
Athlete	Time	Time 1	Time 2	Points	Rank
(Russia) Varvara Zelenskaya	DNF	–	–	DNF	–
(Russia) Svetlana Novikova	1:30.03	38.89	38.94	122.48	19
(Ukraine) Tetiana Lebedeva	1:27.79	40.05	39.82	111.34	18
(Russia) Svetlana Gladysheva	1:26.88	38.15	37.01	61.25	12

== Biathlon ==
Men

Event	Athlete	Misses ^{1}	Time	Rank
10 km Sprint	(Russia) Valeriy Medvedtsev	2	27:39.5	25
10 km Sprint	(Belarus) Aleksandr Popov	1	27:31.3	18
10 km Sprint	(Russia) Valeri Kiriyenko	3	26:31.8	5
10 km Sprint	(Russia) Sergei Tchepikov	0	26:27.5	4

Event	Athlete	Time	Misses	Adjusted time ^{2}	Rank
20 km	(Russia) Valeri Kiriyenko	55:12.6	4	59:12.6	11
20 km	(Russia) Sergei Tchepikov	55:47.6	3	58:47.6	10
20 km	(Belarus) Aleksandr Popov	56:02.9	2	58:02.9	4
20 km	(Belarus) Eugeni Redkine	57:34.4	0	57:34.4	1st place, gold medalist(s)

Men's 4 × 7.5 km relay

Athletes	Race		
Athletes	Misses ^{1}	Time	Rank
(Russia) Valeriy Medvedtsev (Belarus) Aleksandr Popov (Russia) Valery Kiriyenko (Russia) Sergei Tchepikov	0	1'25:06.3	2nd place, silver medalist(s)

Women

Event	Athlete	Misses ^{1}	Time	Rank
7.5 km Sprint	(Russia) Yelena Golovina	1	26:50.3	20
7.5 km Sprint	(Russia) Svetlana Petcherskaia	0	26:09.7	13
7.5 km Sprint	(Russia) Yelena Belova	2	24:50.8	3rd place, bronze medalist(s)
7.5 km Sprint	(Russia) Anfisa Reztsova	3	24:29.2	1st place, gold medalist(s)

Event	Athlete	Time	Misses	Adjusted time ^{2}	Rank
15 km	(Russia) Anfisa Reztsova	47:52.6	9	56:52.6	26
15 km	(Russia) Yelena Golovina	54:17.9	2	56:17.9	22
15 km	(Belarus) Svetlana Paramygina	52:15.2	4	56:15.2	21
15 km	(Russia) Svetlana Petcherskaia	50:58.5	1	51:58.5	2nd place, silver medalist(s)

Women's 3 × 7.5 km relay

Athletes	Race		
Athletes	Misses ^{1}	Time	Rank
(Russia) Yelena Belova (Russia) Anfisa Reztsova (Russia) Yelena Melnikova	2	1'16:54.6	3rd place, bronze medalist(s)

== Bobsleigh ==
Sled	Athletes	Event	Run 1		Run 2		Run 3		Run 4		Total	
Sled	Athletes	Event	Time	Rank	Time	Rank	Time	Rank	Time	Rank	Time	Rank
EUN-1	(Russia) Vladimir Yefimov (Russia) Aleksey Golovin	Two-man	1:01.17	17	1:01.85	21	1:02.03	19	1:02.25	23	4:07.30	20
EUN-2	(Russia) Oleg Sukhoruchenko (Russia) Andrey Gorokhov	Two-man	1:01.77	27	1:02.06	23	1:02.19	23	1:02.31	24	4:08.33	26

Sled	Athletes	Event	Run 1		Run 2		Run 3		Run 4		Total	
Sled	Athletes	Event	Time	Rank	Time	Rank	Time	Rank	Time	Rank	Time	Rank
EUN-1	(Russia) Oleg Sukhoruchenko (Ukraine) Oleksandr Bortiuk (Russia) Vladimir Lyubovitsky (Russia) Andrey Gorokhov	Four-man	59.05	19	1:00.05	22	58.94	12	59.39	19	3:57.43	19
EUN-2	(Russia) Vladimir Yefimov (Russia) Oleg Petrov (Russia) Sergey Kruglov (Russia) Aleksandr Pashkov	Four-man	59.80	23	1:00.19	23	1:00.34	23	1:00.26	23	4:00.59	22

== Cross-country skiing ==
Men

Event	Athlete	Race	
Event	Athlete	Time	Rank
10 km C	(Russia) German Karachevsky	32:12.6	62
10 km C	(Russia) Andrey Kirillov	30:27.4	30
10 km C	(Kazakhstan) Vladimir Smirnov	29:13.1	13
10 km C	(Russia) Mikhail Botvinov	28:55.8	11
15 km pursuit^{1} F	(Russia) German Karachevsky	44:09.5	43
15 km pursuit^{1} F	(Russia) Andrey Kirillov	41:14.9	17
15 km pursuit^{1} F	(Russia) Mikhail Botvinov	41:07.1	15
15 km pursuit^{1} F	(Kazakhstan) Vladimir Smirnov	39:59.8	8
30 km C	(Russia) Aleksey Prokurorov	1'27:20.5	21
30 km C	(Russia) Aleksandr Golubyov	1'25:56.1	14
30 km C	(Russia) Mikhail Botvinov	1'25:36.9	12
30 km C	(Kazakhstan) Vladimir Smirnov	1'25:27.6	9
50 km F	(Kazakhstan) Vladimir Smirnov	2'15:48.5	35
50 km F	(Russia) Mikhail Botvinov	2'14:20.8	28
50 km F	(Russia) Aleksandr Golubyov	2'11:20.1	17
50 km F	(Russia) Aleksey Prokurorov	2'07:06.1	4

^{1} Starting delay based on 10 km results.
C = Classical style, F = Freestyle

Men's 4 × 10 km relay

Athletes	Race	
Athletes	Time	Rank
(Russia) Andrey Kirillov (Kazakhstan) Vladimir Smirnov (Russia) Mikhail Botvinov (Russia) Aleksey Prokurorov	1'43:03.6	5

Women

Event	Athlete	Race	
Event	Athlete	Time	Rank
5 km C	(Russia) Larisa Lazutina	14:41.7	7
5 km C	(Russia) Olga Danilova	14:37.2	6
5 km C	(Russia) Yelena Välbe	14:22.7	3rd place, bronze medalist(s)
5 km C	(Russia) Lyubov Yegorova	14:14.7	2nd place, silver medalist(s)
10 km pursuit^{2} F	(Russia) Olga Danilova	28:10.2	11
10 km pursuit^{2} F	(Russia) Larisa Lazutina	27:34.8	8
10 km pursuit^{2} F	(Russia) Yelena Välbe	26:37.7	3rd place, bronze medalist(s)
10 km pursuit^{2} F	(Russia) Lyubov Yegorova	25:53.7	1st place, gold medalist(s)
15 km C	(Russia) Nataliya Martynova	45:16.1	12
15 km C	(Russia) Raisa Smetanina	44:01.5	4
15 km C	(Russia) Yelena Välbe	43:42.3	3rd place, bronze medalist(s)
15 km C	(Russia) Lyubov Yegorova	42:20.8	1st place, gold medalist(s)
30 km F	(Russia) Olga Danilova	1'30:30.7	20
30 km F	(Russia) Larisa Lazutina	1'26:31.8	5
30 km F	(Russia) Yelena Välbe	1'24:13.9	3rd place, bronze medalist(s)
30 km F	(Russia) Lyubov Yegorova	1'22:52.0	2nd place, silver medalist(s)

^{2} Starting delay based on 5 km results.
C = Classical style, F = Freestyle

Women's 4 × 5 km relay

Athletes	Race	
Athletes	Time	Rank
(Russia) Yelena Välbe (Russia) Raisa Smetanina (Russia) Larisa Lazutina (Russia) Lyubov Yegorova	59:34.8	1st place, gold medalist(s)

== Figure skating ==
Men

Athlete	SP	FS	TFP	Rank
(Ukraine) Vyacheslav Zagorodniuk	10	8	13.0	8
(Russia) Alexei Urmanov	5	5	7.5	5
(Ukraine) Viktor Petrenko	1	1	1.5	1st place, gold medalist(s)

Women

Athlete	SP	FS	TFP	Rank
(Russia) Tatiana Rachkova	13	14	20.5	16
(Russia) Julia Vorobieva	14	13	20.0	14

Pairs

Athletes	SP	FS	TFP	Rank
(Russia) Yevgenya Shishkova (Russia) Vadim Naumov	5	5	7.5	5
(Russia) Elena Bechke (Russia) Denis Petrov	2	2	3.0	2nd place, silver medalist(s)
(Russia) Natalia Mishkutenok (Russia) Artur Dmitriev	1	1	1.5	1st place, gold medalist(s)

Ice Dancing

Athletes	CD1	CD2	OD	FD	TFP	Rank
(Russia) Pasha Grishuk (Russia) Evgeni Platov	4	4	4	4	8.0	4
(Russia) Maya Usova (Russia) Alexander Zhulin	2	2	3	3	5.6	3rd place, bronze medalist(s)
(Russia) Marina Klimova (Russia) Sergei Ponomarenko	1	1	1	1	2.0	1st place, gold medalist(s)

== Freestyle skiing ==
Men

Athlete	Event	Qualification			Final		
Athlete	Event	Time	Points	Rank	Time	Points	Rank
(Russia) Mikhail Lyzhin	Moguls	40.89	16.04	36	Did not advance		
(Kazakhstan) Aleksey Bannikov	Moguls	35.79	17.12	33	Did not advance		
(Russia) Andrey Ivanov	Moguls	36.52	21.24	21	Did not advance		
(Russia) Sergey Shupletsov	Moguls	33.30	22.65	13 Q	34.49	21.60	12

Women

Athlete	Event	Qualification			Final		
Athlete	Event	Time	Points	Rank	Time	Points	Rank
(Uzbekistan) Larisa Udodova	Moguls	47.58	11.17	23	Did not advance		
(Russia) Olga Lychkina	Moguls	42.42	18.04	12	Did not advance		
(Russia) Yelena Korolyova	Moguls	43.52	20.01	10	Did not advance		
(Russia) Yelizaveta Kozhevnikova	Moguls	39.10	22.22	5 Q	39.47	23.50	2nd place, silver medalist(s)

== Ice hockey ==
=== First round ===
Twelve participating teams were placed in two groups. After playing a round-robin, the top four teams in each group advanced to the Medal Round while the last two teams competed in the Consolation Round for the 9th to 12th places.

Team advanced to the Final Round
Team sent to compete in the Consolation Round

Team	GP	W	L	T	GF	GA	DIF	PTS
Canada	5	4	1	0	28	9	19	8
Unified Team	5	4	1	0	32	10	22	8
Czechoslovakia	5	4	1	0	25	15	10	8
France	5	2	3	0	14	22	-8	4
Switzerland	5	1	4	0	13	25	-12	2
Norway	5	0	5	0	7	38	-31	0

Unified Team	8:1	Switzerland
Unified Team	8:1	Norway
Czechoslovakia	4:3	Unified Team
France	0:8	Unified Team
Unified Team	5:4	Canada

=== Final round ===
Quarter-finals

Unified Team	6:1	Finland

Semi-finals

Unified Team	5:2	United States

Final

Unified Team (gold)	3:1	Canada

Gold:
Unified Team

Sergei Bautin
Igor Boldin
Nikolai Borschevsky
Vyacheslav Butsayev
Vyacheslav Bykov
Evgeni Davydov
Alexei Zhitnik
Darius Kasparaitis
Nikolai Khabibulin
Yuri Kmylev
Andrei Khomutov
Andrei Kovalenko
Alexei Kovalev
Igor Kravchuk
Vladimir Malakhov
Dmitri Mironov
Sergei Petrenko
Vitali Prokhorov
Mikhail Shtalenkov
Andrei Trefilov
Dmitri Yushkevich
Alexei Zhamnov
Sergei Zubov

== Luge ==
Men

Athlete	Run 1		Run 2		Run 3		Run 4		Total	
Athlete	Time	Rank	Time	Rank	Time	Rank	Time	Rank	Time	Rank
(Russia) Eduard Burmistrov	46.138	16	46.032	16	46.612	16	46.728	18	3:05.510	16
(Russia) Oleg Yermolin	46.046	15	46.176	18	46.569	14	46.504	15	3:05.295	15
(Russia) Sergey Danilin	45.708	11	45.622	9	46.281	10	46.162	10	3:03.773	9

(Men's) Doubles

Athletes	Run 1		Run 2		Total	
Athletes	Time	Rank	Time	Rank	Time	Rank
(Russia) Albert Demchenko (Russia) Aleksey Zelensky	46.552	7	46.747	9	1:33.299	8
(Russia) Igor Lobanov (Russia) Gennady Belyakov	46.849	10	47.098	13	1:33.947	10

Women

Athlete	Run 1		Run 2		Run 3		Run 4		Total	
Athlete	Time	Rank	Time	Rank	Time	Rank	Time	Rank	Time	Rank
(Russia) Nadezhda Danilina	47.324	14	47.215	10	47.264	11	47.025	9	3:08.828	12
(Russia) Irina Gubkina	47.175	10	47.273	12	47.264	11	47.034	10	3:08.746	10
(Ukraine) Nataliya Yakushenko	47.097	9	47.215	10	47.178	8	46.893	6	3:08.383	8

== Nordic combined ==
Men's individual

Events:

- normal hill ski jumping (Best two out of three jumps.)
- 15 km cross-country skiing (Start delay, based on ski jumping results.)

Athlete	Event	Ski Jumping		Cross-country		Total
Athlete	Event	Points	Rank	Start at	Time	Rank
(Russia) Vasily Savin	Individual	179.4	40	+5:27.4	49:24.8	22
(Russia) Valery Stolyarov	Individual	192.0	32	+4:03.4	51:50.2	32
(Russia) Sergey Shvagirev	Individual	205.0	16	+2:36.7	53:03.6	36
(Russia) Andrey Dundukov	Individual	210.4	11	+2:00.7	47:44.2	11

Men's Team

Three participants per team.

Events:

- normal hill ski jumping (Best two out of three jumps per team member were counted.)
- 10 km cross-country skiing (Start delay, based on ski jumping results.)

Athletes	Ski jumping		Cross-country		Total
Athletes	Points	Rank	Start at	Time	Rank
(Russia) Andrey Dundukov (Russia) Sergey Shvagirev (Russia) Valery Stolyarov	545.3	9	+8:19.0	1'37:57.2	11

== Short track speed skating ==
Men

Athlete	Event	Round one		Quarter finals		Semi finals		Finals	
Athlete	Event	Time	Rank	Time	Rank	Time	Rank	Time	Final rank
(Russia) Dmitry Yershov	1000 m	1:37.71	2 Q	1:34.02	3	Did not advance			

Women

Athlete	Event	Round one		Quarter finals		Semi finals		Finals	
Athlete	Event	Time	Rank	Time	Rank	Time	Rank	Time	Final rank
(Russia) Nataliya Isakova	500 m	48.49	3	Did not advance					
(Russia) Marina Pylayeva	500 m	47.48	2 Q	47.95	1 Q	1:07.56	4 QB	48.42	5
(Russia) Yuliya Vlasova	500 m	48.29	2 Q	48.63	2 Q	1:08.90	4 QB	48.70	7
(Russia) Yuliya Allagulova (Russia) Nataliya Isakova (Russia) Viktoriya Troitskaya-Taranina (Russia) Yuliya Vlasova	3000 m relay					4:38.37	2 Q	4:42.69	3rd place, bronze medalist(s)

== Ski jumping ==
Athlete	Event	Jump 1		Jump 2		Total	
Athlete	Event	Distance	Points	Distance	Points	Points	Rank
(Russia) Yury Dudarev	Normal hill	76.5	84.9	73.5	77.6	162.5	54
(Kazakhstan) Dionis Vodnyev	Normal hill	79.5	88.7	84.0	102.4	191.1	25
(Kazakhstan) Andrey Verveykin	Normal hill	80.0	91.5	80.5	95.3	186.8	32
(Russia) Mikhail Yesin	Normal hill	85.5	105.8	81.5	98.9	204.7	11
(Russia) Yury Dudarev	Large hill	92.0	64.8	86.5	56.1	120.9	47
(Kazakhstan) Andrey Verveykin	Large hill	99.0	79.1	95.5	72.7	151.8	29
(Kazakhstan) Dionis Vodnyev	Large hill	101.5	83.6	95.5	72.7	156.3	24
(Russia) Mikhail Yesin	Large hill	108.0	96.2	99.5	80.3	176.5	10

Men's team large hill

Athletes	Result	
Athletes	Points ^{1}	Rank
(Russia) Mikhail Yesin (Kazakhstan) Dionis Vodnyev (Kazakhstan) Andrey Verveykin (Russia) Yury Dudarev	503.4	11

^{1} Four teams members performed two jumps each. The best three were counted.

== Speed skating ==
Men

Event	Athlete	Race	
Event	Athlete	Time	Rank
500 m	(Russia) Sergey Klevchenya	38.26	21
500 m	(Kazakhstan) Vadim Shakshakbayev	37.86	14
500 m	(Belarus) Igor Zhelezovsky	37.57	8
500 m	(Russia) Aleksandr Golubev	37.51	7
1000 m	(Russia) Andrey Bakhvalov	1:17.21	25
1000 m	(Russia) Aleksandr Klimov	1:16.05	13
1000 m	(Russia) Nikolay Gulyayev	1:15.46	8
1000 m	(Belarus) Igor Zhelezovsky	1:15.05	6
1500 m	(Russia) Aleksandr Klimov	2:00.94	31
1500 m	(Russia) Konstantin Kalistratov	1:59.02	22
1500 m	(Ukraine) Yuriy Shulha	1:57.80	16
1500 m	(Belarus) Igor Zhelezovsky	1:57.24	10
5000 m	(Russia) Bronislav Snetkov	7:28.93	29
5000 m	(Kazakhstan) Vadim Sayutin	7:13.20	11
5000 m	(Kazakhstan) Yevgeny Sanarov	7:11.38	8
10000 m	(Kazakhstan) Vadim Sayutin	14:49.31	19
10000 m	(Russia) Bronislav Snetkov	14:46.87	17
10000 m	(Kazakhstan) Yevgeny Sanarov	14:38.99	10

Women

Event	Athlete	Race	
Event	Athlete	Time	Rank
500 m	(Kazakhstan) Lyudmila Prokasheva	43.19	31
500 m	(Russia) Yelena Tyushnyakova	42.65	29
500 m	(Russia) Oksana Ravilova	41.73	16
500 m	(Russia) Nataliya Polozkova	41.61	15
1000 m	(Russia) Yelena Lapuga	1:25.21	28
1000 m	(Russia) Nataliya Polozkova	1:24.30	20
1000 m	(Russia) Oksana Ravilova	1:24.14	15
1000 m	(Russia) Yelena Tyushnyakova	1:22.97	7
1500 m	(Russia) Yelena Lapuga	2:11.72	25
1500 m	(Kazakhstan) Lyudmila Prokasheva	2:08.71	10
1500 m	(Russia) Svetlana Bazhanova	2:07.81	6
1500 m	(Russia) Nataliya Polozkova	2:07.12	4
3000 m	(Kazakhstan) Lyudmila Prokasheva	4:30.76	10
3000 m	(Russia) Svetlana Bazhanova	4:28.19	7
3000 m	(Russia) Svetlana Boyko	4:28.00	5
5000 m	(Russia) Svetlana Bazhanova	7:45.55	7
5000 m	(Russia) Svetlana Boyko	7:44.19	6
5000 m	(Kazakhstan) Lyudmila Prokasheva	7:41.65	5

== See also ==
- CIS national football team, a football team created in a similar fashion for UEFA Euro 1992
