= Vyacheslav Bykov =

Russian ice hockey coach and player

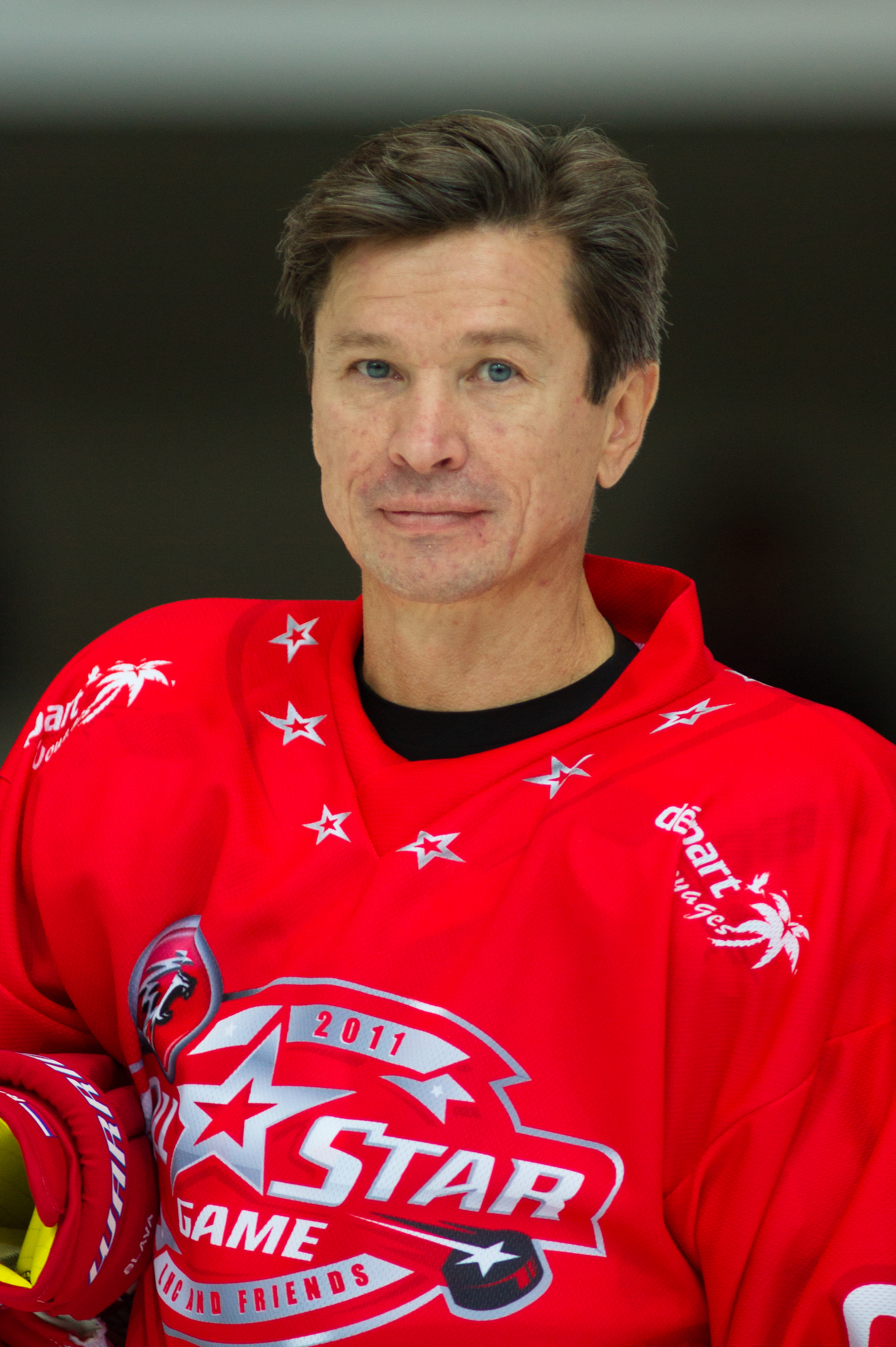
- Bykov at the LHC All Star Game in 2011
- Born: 24 July 1960 (age 65) Chelyabinsk, Russian SFSR, Soviet Union
- Height: 5 ft 8 in (173 cm)
- Weight: 160 lb (73 kg; 11 st 6 lb)
- Position: Centre
- Shot: Left
- Played for: CSKA Moscow; Traktor Chelyabinsk; HC Fribourg-Gottéron; Lausanne HC
- National team: Soviet Union, Unified Team and Russia
- NHL draft: 169th overall, 1989; Quebec Nordiques
- Playing career: 1979–2000

Olympic medal record

Men's ice hockey

Representing Soviet Union
Gold medal – first place	1988 Calgary	Team

Representing Unified Team
Gold medal – first place	1992 Albertville	Team

Vyacheslav Arkadevich "Slava" Bykov (Russian: Вячеслав Аркадьевич Быков, born 24 July 1960) is a Russian former professional ice hockey player and a former head coach of the Russian national hockey team. A small, technically gifted center, he was a regular fixture on the Soviet national ice hockey team in the 1980s; after the fall of the Soviet Union, he played for the Russian team in the 1990s. He was drafted by the Quebec Nordiques in the 1989 NHL entry draft in the 9th round at number 169 overall. He opted, however, not to play in the National Hockey League, playing in Russia and Europe. He was inducted into the IIHF Hall of Fame in 2014.

== Playing career ==
Bykov started out playing for the team of his home city, Traktor Chelyabinsk in 1979. After three years, he went to play for powerhouse CSKA Moscow. While at CSKA Moscow, he became a regular on the Soviet national team and later the Russian team, taking part in the following international tournaments:

- With the Soviet Union:
  - 1983 World Championships (Gold)
  - 1985 World Championships (Bronze)
  - 1986 World Championships (Gold)
  - 1987 World Championships (Silver)
  - 1987 Canada Cup (Silver)
  - 1988 Winter Olympics (Gold)
  - 1989 World Championships (Gold)

With the Unified Team:

  - 1992 Winter Olympics (Gold)

With Russia:

  - 1993 World Championships (Gold)
  - 1995 World Championships (5th place)

In 1990, Bykov went to play with HC Fribourg-Gottéron in the Swiss Nationalliga A. He ended an illustrious playing career in 2000, having played the last two seasons with HC Lausanne in the Nationalliga B.

He was inducted into the IIHF Hall of Fame in 2014.

== Coaching career ==
=== Russian national team ===
On 10 August 2006, Bykov was named as the new head coach of the Russian national hockey team, taking over from Vladimir Krikunov. At the 2007 World Championship in Moscow, his team won the bronze medal. Then, on 18 May 2008, he won 2008 World Championships Gold in Quebec with the team, and on 10 May 2009 again in Bern. After losing 3–7 to Canada and finishing 6th at the 2010 Winter Olympics and failing to win gold in two subsequent WCs, he was fired by the RHF.

- 2007 World Championships (Bronze)
- 2008 World Championships (Gold)
- 2009 World Championships (Gold)
- 2010 Winter Olympics (6th)
- 2010 World Championships (Silver)
- 2011 World Championships (4th)

=== CSKA ===
From 28 April 2004 to 4 April 2009, Bykov worked as the head coach of CSKA Moscow. The best results during this period were the semi-finals of the Russian Superleague and the quarter-finals of the KHL.

=== Salavat Yulaev ===
Salavat Yulaev Ufa named Bykov as new head coach on 14 May 2009 starting from the 2009–2010 season. After winning the Continental Cup and taking bronze in 2009–2010, he won the Gagarin Cup with Salavat Yulaev in 2010–2011.

=== SKA Saint Petersburg ===
SKA Saint Petersburg appointed Bykov as new head coach on 4 April 2014. He signed a two-year contract with an option for a one-year extension. In his first season with the team, Bykov coached SKA to their first ever Gagarin Cup win, becoming the first coach to win the Gagarin Cup with two different teams.

== Career statistics ==
=== Regular season and playoffs ===
			Regular season					Playoffs
Season	Team	League	GP	G	A	Pts	PIM	GP	G	A	Pts	PIM
1979–80	Traktor Chelyabinsk	USSR	3	2	0	2	0	—	—	—	—	—
1980–81	Traktor Chelyabinsk	USSR	48	26	16	42	4	—	—	—	—	—
1981–82	Traktor Chelyabinsk	USSR	44	20	16	36	14	—	—	—	—	—
1982–83	CSKA Moscow	USSR	44	22	22	44	10	—	—	—	—	—
1983–84	CSKA Moscow	USSR	44	22	11	33	12	—	—	—	—	—
1984–85	CSKA Moscow	USSR	36	21	14	35	4	—	—	—	—	—
1985–86	CSKA Moscow	USSR	36	10	10	20	6	—	—	—	—	—
1986–87	CSKA Moscow	USSR	40	18	15	33	10	—	—	—	—	—
1987–88	CSKA Moscow	USSR	47	17	30	47	26	—	—	—	—	—
1988–89	CSKA Moscow	USSR	40	16	20	36	10	—	—	—	—	—
1989–90	CSKA Moscow	USSR	48	21	16	37	16	—	—	—	—	—
1990–91	HC Fribourg–Gottéron	NLA	36	35	49	84	16	8	7	16	23	10
1991–92	HC Fribourg–Gottéron	NLA	34	39	48	87	24	14	4	16	20	10
1992–93	HC Fribourg–Gottéron	NLA	35	25	51	76	14	9	10	12	22	4
1993–94	HC Fribourg–Gottéron	NLA	36	30	43	73	2	11	11	21	32	2
1994–95	HC Fribourg–Gottéron	NLA	30	24	51	75	35	8	6	4	10	4
1995–96	HC Fribourg–Gottéron	NLA	28	10	25	35	8	4	2	1	3	0
1996–97	HC Fribourg–Gottéron	NLA	46	23	45	68	16	3	0	3	3	2
1997–98	HC Fribourg–Gottéron	NLA	18	14	18	32	4	12	2	6	8	6
1998–99	Lausanne HC	NLB	24	19	21	40	40	3	2	4	6	2
1999–2000	Lausanne HC	NLB	6	2	9	11	2	—	—	—	—	—
USSR totals			430	195	170	365	112	—	—	—	—	—
NDA totals			263	200	330	530	119	69	42	79	121	38

=== International ===
Year	Team	Event	Result	GP	G	A	Pts	PIM
1983	Soviet Union	WC	1st place, gold medalist(s)	10	3	2	5	0
1985	Soviet Union	WC	3rd place, bronze medalist(s)	10	6	3	9	2
1986	Soviet Union	WC	1st place, gold medalist(s)	10	6	6	12	2
1987	Soviet Union	WC	2nd place, silver medalist(s)	10	5	6	11	0
1987	Soviet Union	CC	2nd place, silver medalist(s)	9	2	7	9	4
1988	Soviet Union	OG	1st place, gold medalist(s)	7	2	3	5	2
1989	Soviet Union	WC	1st place, gold medalist(s)	10	6	6	12	2
1990	Soviet Union	WC	1st place, gold medalist(s)	10	3	1	4	4
1991	Soviet Union	WC	3rd place, bronze medalist(s)	10	4	4	8	0
1992	Unified Team	OG	1st place, gold medalist(s)	8	4	7	11	0
1993	Russia	WC	1st place, gold medalist(s)	8	4	3	7	6
1995	Russia	WC	5th	6	2	2	4	4
Senior totals				108	47	50	97	26

== Personal life ==
He is married and has two children. In 2003, he became a naturalised Swiss citizen, and his family now lives in Marly, Switzerland.

He is of Mari descent.

In 2023, Bykov slammed the NHL for barring Russian players from bringing the Stanley Cup to Russia, stating he would never watch NHL games again.
