= Andrei Khomutov =

Russian ice hockey player (born 1961)

- Born: April 21, 1961 (age 65) Yaroslavl, Russian SFSR, Soviet Union
- Height: 5 ft 9 in (175 cm)
- Weight: 180 lb (82 kg; 12 st 12 lb)
- Position: Right wing
- Shot: Left
- Played for: CSKA Moscow; Fribourg-Gottéron
- National team: Russia, Unified Team and Soviet Union
- NHL draft: 190th overall, 1989; Quebec Nordiques
- Playing career: 1980–1998

Olympic medal record

Men's ice hockey

Representing the Soviet Union
Gold medal – first place	1984 Sarajevo	Team
Gold medal – first place	1988 Calgary	Team

Representing the Unified Team
Gold medal – first place	1992 Albertville	Team

Andrei Valentinovich Khomutov (Russian: Андрей Валентинович Хомутов; born April 21, 1961) is a Russian former professional ice hockey right winger. He was the head coach for Barys Astana of the Kontinental Hockey League (KHL) and the Kazakhstan national team during the 2010–2011 season. He played for CSKA Moscow (Red Army team) from 1979 to 1990, and then in Switzerland for HC Fribourg-Gottéron from 1990 to 1998. He was named most valuable player in the Soviet league in 1990, and also led the league in goals in 1988.

Khomutov played for the Soviet national team from 1981 to 1983, 1985–87 and 1989; for the Unified Team in 1992, and for Russia in 1993 and 1995. He was on the winning side at the 1981 Canada Cup; the IIHF World Championships in 1981, 1982, 1983, 1986, 1989 and 1993; and the 1984, 1988 and 1992 Winter Olympics.

Khomutov was inducted into the IIHF Hall of Fame in 2014.

== Career statistics ==
=== Regular season and playoffs ===
			Regular season					Playoffs
Season	Team	League	GP	G	A	Pts	PIM	GP	G	A	Pts	PIM
1979–80	SKA MVO Kalinin	USSR III	—	14	—	—	—	—	—	—	—	—
1979–80	CSKA Moscow	USSR	4	0	0	0	0	—	—	—	—	—
1980–81	CSKA Moscow	USSR	43	23	18	41	4	—	—	—	—	—
1981–82	CSKA Moscow	USSR	44	17	13	30	12	—	—	—	—	—
1982–83	CSKA Moscow	USSR	44	21	17	38	6	—	—	—	—	—
1983–84	CSKA Moscow	USSR	39	17	9	26	14	—	—	—	—	—
1984–85	CSKA Moscow	USSR	37	21	13	34	18	—	—	—	—	—
1985–86	CSKA Moscow	USSR	38	14	15	29	10	—	—	—	—	—
1986–87	CSKA Moscow	USSR	33	15	18	33	22	—	—	—	—	—
1987–88	CSKA Moscow	USSR	48	29	14	43	22	—	—	—	—	—
1988–89	CSKA Moscow	USSR	44	19	16	35	14	—	—	—	—	—
1989–90	CSKA Moscow	USSR	47	21	14	35	12	—	—	—	—	—
1990–91	HC Fribourg–Gottéron	NDA	36	39	43	82	10	8	14	12	26	4
1991–92	HC Fribourg–Gottéron	NDA	35	33	46	79	34	14	11	12	23	6
1992–93	HC Fribourg–Gottéron	NDA	27	23	36	59	16	11	7	11	18	8
1993–94	HC Fribourg–Gottéron	NDA	35	39	35	74	18	11	11	14	25	6
1994–95	HC Fribourg–Gottéron	NDA	35	41	45	86	32	8	4	9	13	4
1995–96	HC Fribourg–Gottéron	NDA	9	3	6	9	6	—	—	—	—	—
1996–97	HC Fribourg–Gottéron	NDA	44	26	40	66	67	3	1	6	7	0
1997–98	HC Fribourg–Gottéron	NDA	27	16	18	34	47	12	5	7	12	4
USSR totals			421	197	147	344	134	—	—	—	—	—
NDA totals			248	220	269	489	230	67	53	71	124	32

=== International ===
Year	Team	Event	Result	GP	G	A	Pts	PIM
1981	Soviet Union	WJC	3rd place, bronze medalist(s)	5	3	1	4	4
1981	Soviet Union	WC	1st place, gold medalist(s)	7	2	1	3	0
1981	Soviet Union	CC	1st place, gold medalist(s)	6	0	0	0	0
1982	Soviet Union	WC	1st place, gold medalist(s)	6	1	1	2	2
1983	Soviet Union	WC	1st place, gold medalist(s)	8	1	3	4	6
1984	Soviet Union	OG	1st place, gold medalist(s)	7	2	1	3	4
1985	Soviet Union	WC	3rd place, bronze medalist(s)	10	4	3	7	2
1986	Soviet Union	WC	1st place, gold medalist(s)	10	0	4	4	6
1987	Soviet Union	WC	2nd place, silver medalist(s)	9	2	3	5	6
1987	Soviet Union	CC	2nd place, silver medalist(s)	9	4	3	7	0
1988	Soviet Union	OG	1st place, gold medalist(s)	8	2	4	6	4
1989	Soviet Union	WC	1st place, gold medalist(s)	10	3	6	9	4
1990	Soviet Union	WC	1st place, gold medalist(s)	10	11	5	16	4
1992	Unified Team	OG	1st place, gold medalist(s)	8	7	7	14	2
1993	Russia	WC	1st place, gold medalist(s)	8	5	7	12	10
1995	Russia	WC	5th	6	1	3	4	0
Senior totals				116	44	50	94	48

Awards and achievements
Preceded by Sergei Makarov	Soviet MVP; 1990	Succeeded by Valeri Kamensky
