= Yuri Khmylev =

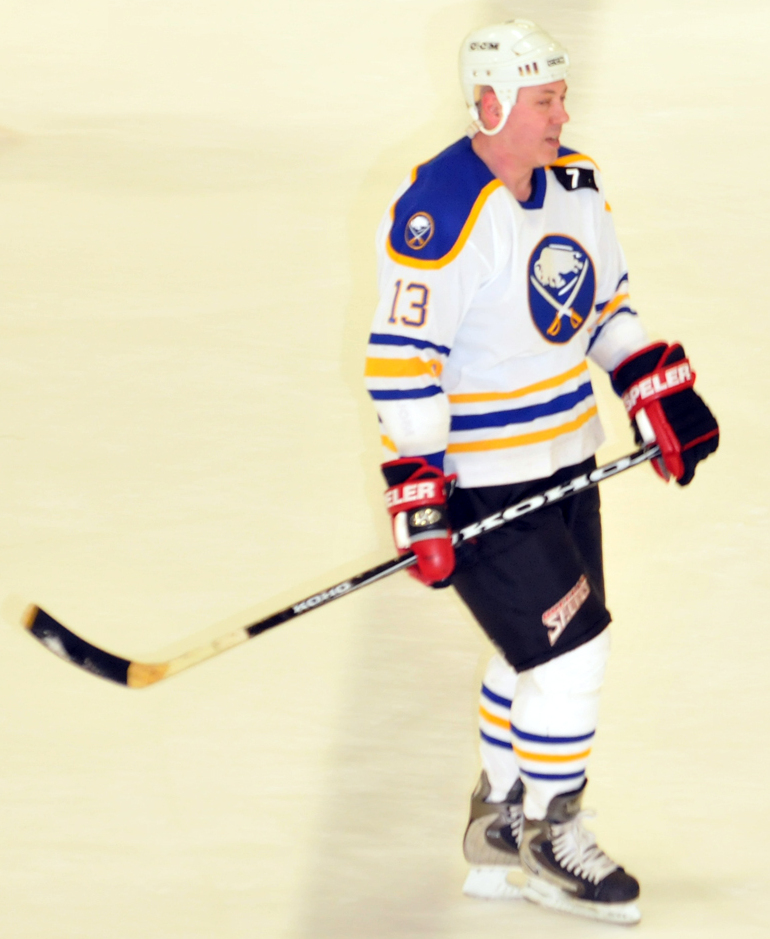
- Khmylev with the Buffalo Sabres Alumni Hockey Team in 2011
- Born: August 9, 1964 (age 61) Moscow, Soviet Union
- Height: 6 ft 1 in (185 cm)
- Weight: 190 lb (86 kg; 13 st 8 lb)
- Position: Left wing
- Shot: Right
- Played for: Krylya Sovetov Moscow; Buffalo Sabres; St. Louis Blues; HC Fribourg-Gottéron
- National team: Soviet Union, Unified Team and Russia
- NHL draft: 108th overall, 1992; Buffalo Sabres
- Playing career: 1981–1999

Olympic medal record

Men's ice hockey
Gold medal – first place	1992 Albertville	Ice hockey

Yuri Alexeyevich Khmylev (Russian: Юрий Алексеевич Хмылëв, Yuriy Alekseevich Khmylyov; born August 9, 1964) is a Russian former professional ice hockey player. Khmylev played 11 seasons in his native Russia for Krylya Sovetov (Soviet Wings) before being selected as a 27-year-old in the 5th round, 108th overall, of the 1992 NHL entry draft by the Buffalo Sabres.

== Russian career ==
Khmylev represented the former Soviet Union several times on the international stage, beginning with the 1984 gold medal-winning World Junior Championships squad. Khmylev went on to play on the Soviet squads in the 1986, 1987 and 1989 World Championships (winning gold, silver, and gold medals, respectively). He played in Rendez-vous '87, a two-game series in Quebec City versus a team of National Hockey League all-stars and participated in the Canada Cup later that year, where the Soviets placed second. In 1989, Khmylev played in two games for CSKA Moscow during the Super Series against NHL clubs.

Khmylev also suited up for his long-time team, Krylya Sovetov, when it played several NHL teams during the 1989–90 season, and during the Friendship Tour games in Moscow in 1989 and 1990. His final appearance for Russian hockey came during the 1992 Winter Olympics in Albertville, France. The Unified Team, consisting of players from former Soviet states, won the gold medal, defeating Canada in the final tournament of the Olympics. Khmylev scored 10 points in eight games during the Olympics.

== North American career ==
Khmylev was selected the following summer by the Sabres and came to North America. He experienced immediate success in the NHL, scoring 20 goals as a rookie in 1992–93 and 27 the following season. His scoring tailed off following the 1994–95 NHL lockout, as he scored just 16 goals in his next 114 games for the Sabres. On March 20, 1996, Khmylev was traded to the St. Louis Blues along with Buffalo's 8th round choice (Andrei Podkonicky) in the 1996 NHL entry draft for Jean-Luc Grand-Pierre, Ottawa's 2nd round choice (previously acquired, Buffalo selected Cory Sarich) in 1996 NHL entry draft and St. Louis' 3rd round choice (Maxim Afinogenov) in the 1997 NHL entry draft. Following the trade, Khmylev went on to play in just nine more NHL games with the Blues, scoring one goal. For his NHL career, Khmylev accumulated 64 goals, 88 assists and 133 penalty minutes in 263 games.

Following a brief stint with HC Fribourg-Gottéron of the Swiss Nationalliga A in 1997–98, Khmylev returned to North America for his final professional season. In 1998–99, he suited up for the St. John's Maple Leafs of the American Hockey League, where he amassed 33 points in 48 games.

Khmylev returned to Buffalo following his retirement, as he is now an amateur scout with the Buffalo Sabres. He has a wife, Vera, and a daughter, Olga, who played tennis at Boston College. Olga now works at the Academy of Hockey at HARBORCENTER in Buffalo, NY, and is the official video presenter for the IIHF at the World Championships.

== Awards ==
Inducted into the Russian and Soviet Hockey Hall of Fame in 1992

International Medals:
1984 World Junior Championships – Gold
1986 World Championships – Gold
1987 World Championships – Silver
1989 World Championships – Gold
1992 Winter Olympics – Gold

== Career statistics ==
=== Regular season and playoffs ===
			Regular season					Playoffs
Season	Team	League	GP	G	A	Pts	PIM	GP	G	A	Pts	PIM
1980–81	Krylya Sovetov Moscow	USSR	—	—	—	—	—	—	—	—	—	—
1981–82	Krylya Sovetov Moscow	USSR	8	2	2	4	2	—	—	—	—	—
1981–82	Lokomotiv Moscow	USSR II	6	2	0	2	0	—	—	—	—	—
1982–83	Krylya Sovetov Moscow	USSR	51	9	7	16	14	—	—	—	—	—
1983–84	Krylya Sovetov Moscow	USSR	43	7	8	15	10	—	—	—	—	—
1984–85	Krylya Sovetov Moscow	USSR	30	11	4	15	24	—	—	—	—	—
1985–86	Krylya Sovetov Moscow	USSR	40	24	9	33	22	—	—	—	—	—
1986–87	Krylya Sovetov Moscow	USSR	40	15	15	30	48	—	—	—	—	—
1987–88	Krylya Sovetov Moscow	USSR	48	21	8	29	46	—	—	—	—	—
1988–89	Krylya Sovetov Moscow	USSR	44	16	18	34	38	—	—	—	—	—
1989–90	Krylya Sovetov Moscow	USSR	44	14	13	27	30	—	—	—	—	—
1990–91	Krylya Sovetov Moscow	USSR	45	25	14	39	26	—	—	—	—	—
1991–92	Krylya Sovetov Moscow	CIS	36	15	15	30	20	6	4	2	6	0
1992–93	Buffalo Sabres	NHL	68	20	19	39	28	8	4	3	7	4
1993–94	Buffalo Sabres	NHL	72	27	31	58	49	7	3	1	4	8
1994–95	Krylya Sovetov Moscow	IHL	11	2	2	4	4	—	—	—	—	—
1994–95	Buffalo Sabres	NHL	48	8	17	25	14	5	0	1	1	8
1995–96	Buffalo Sabres	NHL	66	8	20	28	40	—	—	—	—	—
1995–96	St. Louis Blues	NHL	7	0	1	1	0	6	1	1	2	4
1996–97	St. Louis Blues	NHL	2	1	0	1	2	—	—	—	—	—
1996–97	Quebec Rafales	IHL	15	1	7	8	4	—	—	—	—	—
1996–97	Hamilton Bulldogs	AHL	52	5	19	24	13	22	6	7	13	12
1997–98	HC Fribourg–Gottéron	NDA	17	5	6	11	2	2	1	0	1	0
1998–99	St. John's Maple Leafs	AHL	48	12	21	33	19	5	2	1	3	4
USSR totals			429	159	113	272	280	6	4	2	6	0
NHL totals			263	64	88	152	133	26	8	6	14	24

=== International ===
Year	Team	Event	Result	GP	G	A	Pts	PIM
1982	Soviet Union	EJC	3rd place, bronze medalist(s)	5	2	3	5	4
1984	Soviet Union	WJC	1st place, gold medalist(s)	7	2	7	9	0
1986	Soviet Union	WC	1st place, gold medalist(s)	6	2	1	3	4
1987	Soviet Union	WC	2nd place, silver medalist(s)	10	1	1	2	8
1987	Soviet Union	CC	2nd place, silver medalist(s)	9	0	1	1	2
1989	Soviet Union	WC	1st place, gold medalist(s)	8	1	3	4	8
1992	Unified Team	OG	1st place, gold medalist(s)	8	4	6	10	4
1992	Russia	WC	5th	5	0	1	1	0
Junior totals				12	4	10	14	4
Senior totals				46	8	13	21	18
