= Igor Boldin =

- Born: February 2, 1964 (age 62) Moscow, Russian SFSR, Soviet Union
- Height: 5 ft 10 in (178 cm)
- Weight: 187 lb (85 kg; 13 st 5 lb)
- Position: Center
- Shot: Left
- Played for: HC Spartak Moscow; HPK; FPS; TuTo; Brynäs IF
- National team: Unified Team
- NHL draft: 180th overall, 1992; St. Louis Blues
- Playing career: 1981–2003

Igor Petrovich Boldin (Russian: Игорь Петрович Болдин; born February 2, 1964) is a Russian former professional ice hockey player who played in the Soviet Hockey League. He played for HC Spartak Moscow. He was inducted into the Russian and Soviet Hockey Hall of Fame in 1992.

== Family ==
Boldin's son, also named Igor (born January 16, 1995), is currently playing hockey in the Russian Minor Hockey League with MHC Spartak.

== Career statistics ==
=== Regular season and playoffs ===
			Regular season					Playoffs
Season	Team	League	GP	G	A	Pts	PIM	GP	G	A	Pts	PIM
1981–82	Spartak Moscow	USSR	3	1	0	1	0	—	—	—	—	—
1982–83	Spartak Moscow	USSR	41	14	8	22	4	—	—	—	—	—
1983–84	Spartak Moscow	USSR	40	12	19	31	2	—	—	—	—	—
1984–85	Spartak Moscow	USSR	48	10	10	20	12	—	—	—	—	—
1985–86	Spartak Moscow	USSR	36	8	6	14	2	—	—	—	—	—
1986–87	Spartak Moscow	USSR	40	5	8	13	8	—	—	—	—	—
1987–88	Spartak Moscow	USSR	41	20	9	29	4	—	—	—	—	—
1988–89	Spartak Moscow	USSR	43	9	7	16	6	—	—	—	—	—
1989–90	Spartak Moscow	USSR	45	13	18	31	8	—	—	—	—	—
1990–91	Spartak Moscow	USSR	43	8	15	23	8	—	—	—	—	—
1991–92	Spartak Moscow	CIS	35	6	24	30	2	6	2	1	3	2
1993–94	HPK	Liiga	44	17	29	46	0	—	—	—	—	—
1994–95	HPK	Liiga	35	8	18	26	12	—	—	—	—	—
1994–95	FPS	FIN II	1	0	0	0	0	—	—	—	—	—
1995–96	Spartak Moscow	IHL	3	0	1	1	0	—	—	—	—	—
1995–96	TuTo	Liiga	17	7	5	12	6	—	—	—	—	—
1995–96	EHC Biel-Bienne	SUI II	10	3	4	7	2	—	—	—	—	—
1996–97	Brynäs IF	SEL	45	6	24	30	8	—	—	—	—	—
1997–98	Spartak Moscow	RSL	38	6	20	26	10	—	—	—	—	—
1998–99	Spartak Moscow	RSL	40	3	6	9	2	—	—	—	—	—
1999–2000	Spartak Moscow	RUS II	32	12	18	30	33	—	—	—	—	—
2000–01	Spartak Moscow	RUS II	20	8	11	19	2	11	3	3	6	0
2001–02	Spartak Moscow	RSL	24	6	9	15	4	—	—	—	—	—
2002–03	THC Tver	RUS II	28	2	7	9	0	—	—	—	—	—
USSR totals			415	106	124	230	56	6	2	1	3	2
Liiga totals			96	32	52	84	18	—	—	—	—	—
RSL totals			102	15	35	40	16	—	—	—	—	—

=== International ===
Medal record

Men's ice hockey

Representing Unified Team

Olympic Games
Gold medal – first place	1992 Albertville	Team

Year	Team	Event	Result	GP	G	A	Pts	PIM
1982	Soviet Union	EJC	3rd place, bronze medalist(s)	5	2	4	6	6
1983	Soviet Union	WJC	1st place, gold medalist(s)	7	1	5	6	0
1984	Soviet Union	WJC	1st place, gold medalist(s)	7	2	3	5	0
1992	Unified Team	OG	1st place, gold medalist(s)	8	2	6	8	0
1992	Russia	WC	5th	6	3	1	4	0
Junior totals				19	5	12	17	6
Senior totals				14	5	7	12	0
