= Evgeny Davydov =

Russian ice hockey player (born 1967)

- Born: May 27, 1967 (age 59) Chelyabinsk, Russian SFSR, Soviet Union
- Height: 6 ft 0 in (183 cm)
- Weight: 183 lb (83 kg; 13 st 1 lb)
- Position: Right wing
- Shot: Right
- Played for: Traktor Chelyabinsk; CSKA Moscow; Winnipeg Jets; Florida Panthers; Ottawa Senators; EHC Olten; HC Amiens Somme; Brynäs IF; Ak Bars Kazan; EV Zug; Kärpät; Berlin Capitals; Krylya Sovetov Moscow; Milano Vipers
- National team: Soviet Union and Unified Team
- NHL draft: 235th overall, 1989; Winnipeg Jets
- Playing career: 1984–2003

Yevgeni Vitalievich Davydov (Russian: Евгений Витальевич Давыдов); born May 27, 1967) is a Russian former professional ice hockey player who played in the National Hockey League for the Winnipeg Jets, Florida Panthers and the Ottawa Senators.

== Playing career ==
On January 4, 1987, Davydov was playing for the Soviet Union's team at the World Junior Championship. In the infamous "Punch-up in Piestany", Davydov was identified as the player who jumped the boards and caused a bench-clearing brawl. Both teams were ejected from the tournament and Canada lost an assured medal.

Davydov was drafted 235th overall by Winnipeg in the 1989 NHL entry draft. After winning a gold medal as a member of the Unified Team at the 1992 Winter Olympics, he joined the Jets and went on to play in 155 regular season games, scoring 40 goals and 39 assists for 79 points, while accumulating 120 penalty minutes. Between 1995 and 2003, Davydov had spells in France, Sweden, Switzerland, Finland, Germany, Italy, and also returned to Russia before hanging up his skates.

== Career statistics ==
=== Regular season and playoffs ===
			Regular season					Playoffs
Season	Team	League	GP	G	A	Pts	PIM	GP	G	A	Pts	PIM
1984–85	Traktor Chelyabinsk	USSR	11	1	0	1	2	—	—	—	—	—
1985–86	Traktor Chelyabinsk	USSR	39	11	5	16	22	—	—	—	—	—
1986–87	CSKA Moscow	USSR	32	11	2	13	8	—	—	—	—	—
1987–88	CSKA Moscow	USSR	44	16	7	23	18	—	—	—	—	—
1988–89	CSKA Moscow	USSR	35	9	7	16	4	—	—	—	—	—
1989–90	CSKA Moscow	USSR	44	17	6	23	16	—	—	—	—	—
1990–91	CSKA Moscow	USSR	44	10	10	20	26	—	—	—	—	—
1991–92	CSKA Moscow	CIS	27	13	12	25	14	—	—	—	—	—
1991–92	Winnipeg Jets	NHL	12	4	3	7	8	7	2	2	4	2
1992–93	Winnipeg Jets	NHL	79	28	21	49	66	4	0	0	0	0
1993–94	Florida Panthers	NHL	21	2	6	8	8	—	—	—	—	—
1993–94	Ottawa Senators	NHL	40	5	7	12	38	—	—	—	—	—
1994–95	Ottawa Senators	NHL	3	1	2	3	0	—	—	—	—	—
1994–95	San Diego Gulls	IHL	11	2	1	3	14	—	—	—	—	—
1994–95	Chicago Wolves	IHL	18	10	12	22	26	3	1	0	1	0
1995–96	EHC Olten	SUI II	7	7	7	14	8	—	—	—	—	—
1995–96	HC Amiens Somme	FRA	3	3	0	3	4	13	15	9	24	54
1996–97	Brynäs IF	SEL	46	30	18	48	103	—	—	—	—	—
1997–98	Brynäs IF	SEL	40	17	16	33	32	3	1	0	1	0
1998–99	Ak Bars Kazan	RSL	14	2	2	4	45	—	—	—	—	—
1998–99	EV Zug	NDA	11	4	3	7	4	4	0	1	1	4
1999–2000	EHC Olten	SUI II	36	26	30	56	70	4	1	3	4	8
2000–01	EHC Olten	SUI II	40	32	47	79	18	4	3	4	7	12
2001–02	Kärpät	SM-l	7	2	1	3	4	—	—	—	—	—
2001–02	Berlin Capitals	DEL	34	5	9	14	14	3	1	0	1	0
2002–03	Krylya Sovetov Moscow	RSL	5	0	0	0	4	—	—	—	—	—
2002–03	Milano Vipers	ITA	2	1	1	2	0	—	—	—	—	—
2003–04	Olofströms IK	SWE III	12	3	3	6	6	—	—	—	—	—
2003–04	Velkom Moscow	RUS III	30	10	20	30	24	—	—	—	—	—
USSR/CIS totals			270	88	49	137	110	—	—	—	—	—
NHL totals			155	40	39	79	120	11	2	2	4	2
SEL totals			86	47	34	81	110	3	1	0	1	0

=== International ===
Evgeny Davydov
Medal record

Men's ice hockey
Gold medal – first place	1992 Albertville	Ice hockey

Year	Team	Event	Place	GP	G	A	Pts	PIM
1986	Soviet Union	WJC	1st place, gold medalist(s)	7	3	1	4	2
1987	Soviet Union	WJC	DQ	6	3	0	3	4
1990	Soviet Union	WC	1st place, gold medalist(s)	9	5	4	9	6
1992	Unified Team	OG	1st place, gold medalist(s)	8	3	3	6	2
Junior totals				13	6	1	7	6
Senior totals				17	8	7	15	8
