= Mikhail Shtalenkov =

Russian ice hockey player (born 1965)

- Born: October 20, 1965 (age 60) Moscow, Soviet Union
- Height: 6 ft 2 in (188 cm)
- Weight: 185 lb (84 kg; 13 st 3 lb)
- Position: Goaltender
- Caught: Left
- Played for: HC Dynamo Moscow; Mighty Ducks of Anaheim; Edmonton Oilers; Phoenix Coyotes; Florida Panthers
- National team: Soviet Union, Unified Team and Russia
- NHL draft: 108th overall, 1993; Mighty Ducks of Anaheim
- Playing career: 1985–2002

Mikhail Alekseyevich Shtalenkov (Russian: Михаил Алексеевич Шталенков; born October 20, 1965) is a Russian former professional ice hockey goaltender. He played extensively in his native USSR and Russia for HC Dynamo Moscow before moving to North America, where he played with the Mighty Ducks of Anaheim, Edmonton Oilers, Phoenix Coyotes and Florida Panthers of the National Hockey League (NHL). He had been previously selected in the fifth round of the 1993 NHL entry draft, 108th overall, by the Mighty Ducks. Internationally he played in the 1992 and 1998 Winter Olympics, as well as several World Championships, representing successfully the Soviet Union, Unified Team, and Russia.

== Playing career ==
Shtalenkov began his major-league hockey career with Dynamo Moscow in 1986, backing up veteran star Vladimir Myshkin. The team won the Soviet Championship in 1990, ending the 13-year dominance of rival team CSKA Moscow, with Shtalenkov and Myshkin splitting playing time almost evenly. Dynamo went on to win the championship the next two years in 1991 and 1992, with Shtalenkov entrenched as the starter. By the 1991–92 season, he was also the starting goaltender on the Soviet national team.

Shtalenkov moved to North America in 1992, after backstopping the Unified Team to the Olympic gold medal, signing with Milwaukee Admirals of the International Hockey League. After one season, he was drafted 108th overall by the Mighty Ducks of Anaheim in 1993 and spent five seasons with the team. He originally began with the IHL's San Diego Gulls, but received the call-up to the Mighty Ducks after Ron Tugnutt was traded to the Montreal Canadiens and Shtalenkov served as back-up to Guy Hebert and would continue to do so until the 1997-98 season. During the 1997 Play Offs against Detroit he took over for Guy Hebert who suffered a knee injury in Game 2 and performed very well forcing the Red Wings into overtime in every game, facing 162 shots in the series. In Game 4 he registered 70 saves in a double overtime loss. Under new head coach Pierre Page he saw more ice time and became their starting goalie in 97/98 on March 8, 1998 after Guy Hebert suffered a severe shoulder injury forcing him to miss the remainder of the season. He appeared in 18 of the last 21 games playing a career-high 40 games.

Shtalenkov was claimed in the 1998 NHL Expansion Draft by the Nashville Predators but was later traded to the Edmonton Oilers in exchange for Éric Fichaud. In his one season with the Oilers, he shared the starting goaltender role with Bob Essensa, but was acquired by the Phoenix Coyotes at the end of the season and served as Nikolai Khabibulin's back up. After only a handful of games in Phoenix in late 1999, Shtalenkov was traded once more to the Florida Panthers for Sean Burke. In 2000, Shtalenkov returned to Dynamo Moscow and eventually retired from hockey in 2002.

== International play ==
Medal record

Representing (Russia) & Unified Team

Ice hockey

Olympic Games
| Gold medal – first place | 1992 Albertville | |
| Silver medal – second place | 1998 Nagano | |

Shtalenkov excelled internationally over his career in which he represented the Soviet Union, the Unified Team and Russia many times in the World Championships, Canada Cup, World Cup of Hockey and Winter Olympics. He also played in the 1991 Super Series for Dynamo Moscow versus various NHL teams.

At the 1991 Canada Cup, while playing on a team that was missing most of its elite stars, he still managed to hold an undefeated Canada to a 3-3 tie in their last game. At the 1992 Winter Olympics he won a gold medal with the Unified Team as the starting goaltender. He was the 3rd Goalie at the 1996 World Cup of Hockey for Russia, though he did play against Germany in one of Russia's Exhibition games in which they won 4-2 in Landshut, Germany. On a team that was missing many of their top stars due to players declining and injuries, Shtalenkov carried the team to a silver medal with Russia with 4 wins in 5 games in the 1998 Winter Olympics in Nagano, Japan.

== Personal life ==
On March 27, 2012, Shtalenkov went missing after arriving to Moscow on a flight from Magnitogorsk two days earlier. Shtalenkov's wife phoned the police after her husband did not come home from Moscow's Vnukovo Airport on Sunday and reported him missing. However, after being informed of the reports of his disappearance, Shtalenkov phoned his wife and informed her of his well being, according to police sources.

== Career statistics ==
=== Regular season and playoffs ===
| | | | Regular season | | | | | | | | | Playoffs |
| Season | Team | League | GP | W | L | T | MIN | GA | SO | GAA | SV% | GP | W | L | MIN | GA | SO | GAA | SV% |
|---|---|---|---|---|---|---|---|---|---|---|---|---|---|---|---|---|---|---|---|
| 1986–87 | Dynamo Moscow | USSR | 17 | — | — | — | 893 | 36 | 1 | 2.41 | — | — | — | — | — | — | — | — | — |
| 1987–88 | Dynamo Moscow | USSR | 25 | — | — | — | 1302 | 72 | 1 | 3.31 | — | — | — | — | — | — | — | — | — |
| 1988–89 | Dynamo Moscow | USSR | 4 | — | — | — | 240 | 9 | — | 2.25 | — | — | — | — | — | — | — | — | — |
| 1989–90 | Dynamo Moscow | USSR | 6 | — | — | — | 360 | 18 | — | 3.00 | — | — | — | — | — | — | — | — | — |
| 1989–90 | Dynamo–2 Moscow | USSR.3 | 31 | — | — | — | — | — | — | — | — | — | — | — | — | — | — | — | — |
| 1990–91 | Dynamo Moscow | USSR | 31 | — | — | — | 1568 | 56 | 2 | 2.14 | — | — | — | — | — | — | — | — | — |
| 1991–92 | Dynamo Moscow | CIS | 27 | — | — | — | 1268 | 48 | 1 | 2.12 | — | — | — | — | — | — | — | — | — |
| 1991–92 | Dynamo–2 Moscow | CIS.3 | 2 | — | — | — | — | — | — | — | — | — | — | — | — | — | — | — | — |
| 1992–93 | Milwaukee Admirals | IHL | 47 | 26 | 14 | 5 | 2669 | 135 | 2 | 3.03 | .897 | 3 | 1 | 2 | 209 | 11 | 0 | 3.16 | .893 |
| 1993–94 | Mighty Ducks of Anaheim | NHL | 10 | 3 | 4 | 1 | 543 | 24 | 0 | 2.65 | .909 | — | — | — | — | — | — | — | — |
| 1993–94 | San Diego Gulls | IHL | 28 | 15 | 11 | 2 | 1616 | 93 | 0 | 3.45 | .896 | — | — | — | — | — | — | — | — |
| 1994–95 | Mighty Ducks of Anaheim | NHL | 18 | 4 | 7 | 1 | 810 | 49 | 0 | 3.63 | .891 | — | — | — | — | — | — | — | — |
| 1995–96 | Mighty Ducks of Anaheim | NHL | 30 | 7 | 16 | 3 | 1637 | 85 | 0 | 3.12 | .896 | — | — | — | — | — | — | — | — |
| 1996–97 | Mighty Ducks of Anaheim | NHL | 24 | 7 | 8 | 1 | 1079 | 52 | 2 | 2.89 | .904 | 4 | 0 | 3 | 211 | 10 | 0 | 2.84 | .938 |
| 1997–98 | Mighty Ducks of Anaheim | NHL | 40 | 13 | 18 | 5 | 2049 | 110 | 1 | 3.22 | .893 | — | — | — | — | — | — | — | — |
| 1998–99 | Edmonton Oilers | NHL | 34 | 12 | 17 | 3 | 1819 | 81 | 3 | 2.67 | .896 | — | — | — | — | — | — | — | — |
| 1998–99 | Phoenix Coyotes | NHL | 4 | 1 | 2 | 1 | 243 | 9 | 0 | 2.22 | .913 | — | — | — | — | — | — | — | — |
| 1999–00 | Phoenix Coyotes | NHL | 15 | 7 | 6 | 2 | 904 | 36 | 2 | 2.39 | .903 | — | — | — | — | — | — | — | — |
| 1999–00 | Florida Panthers | NHL | 15 | 8 | 4 | 2 | 882 | 34 | 0 | 2.31 | .908 | — | — | — | — | — | — | — | — |
| 2000–01 | Dynamo Moscow | RSL | 25 | — | — | — | 1446 | 47 | 6 | 1.95 | .915 | — | — | — | — | — | — | — | — |
| 2001–02 | Dynamo Moscow | RSL | 28 | — | — | — | 1688 | 57 | 1 | 2.03 | .908 | — | — | — | — | — | — | — | — |
| USSR/CIS/RSL totals | | | 163 | — | — | — | 8765 | 343 | — | 2.35 | — | — | — | — | — | — | — | — | — |
| NHL totals | | | 190 | 62 | 82 | 19 | 9966 | 480 | 8 | 2.89 | .898 | 4 | 0 | 3 | 211 | 10 | 0 | 2.84 | .938 |

=== International ===
| Year | Team | Event | GP | W | L | T | MIN | GA | SO | GAA | SV% |
|---|---|---|---|---|---|---|---|---|---|---|---|
| 1991 | Soviet Union | CC | 5 | 1 | 2 | 1 | 276 | 11 | 0 | 2.39 | .904 |
| 1992 | Unified Team | OG | 8 | 7 | 1 | 0 | 440 | 12 | 1 | 1.64 | .919 |
| 1992 | Russia | WC | 6 | 3 | 1 | 1 | 293 | 10 | 1 | 2.05 | .897 |
| 1994 | Russia | WC | 6 | 3 | 1 | 0 | 296 | 5 | 2 | 1.01 | .962 |
| 1996 | Russia | WC | 3 | 2 | 1 | 0 | 185 | 10 | 1 | 3.24 | .891 |
| 1998 | Russia | OG | 5 | 4 | 1 | 0 | 290 | 8 | 0 | 1.65 | .931 |
| 2001 | Russia | WC | 2 | — | — | — | 104 | 6 | 0 | 3.46 | .870 |
| Senior totals | | | 35 | — | — | — | 1884 | 62 | 5 | 1.97 | — |

== Transactions ==
- June 26, 1993 - Anaheim drafts Shtalenkov.
- June 26, 1998 - Nashville selects Shtalenkov in the 1998 NHL Expansion Draft.
- October 1, 1998 - Nashville trades Shtalenkov and Jim Dowd to Edmonton in exchange for Drake Berehowsky, Greg De Vries and Éric Fichaud.
- March 11, 1999 - Edmonton trades Shtalenkov to Phoenix for a conditional draft choice.
- November 18, 1999 - Phoenix trades Shtalenkov to Florida along with a 4th round draft pick (Chris Eade) in exchange for Sean Burke and a 5th round pick (Nate Kiser).
