= Dmitri Mironov =

Russian ice hockey player (born 1965)

- Born: December 25, 1965 (age 60) Moscow, Soviet Union
- Height: 6 ft 3 in (191 cm)
- Weight: 215 lb (98 kg; 15 st 5 lb)
- Position: Defense
- Shot: Right
- Played for: HC CSKA Moscow; Krylya Sovetov Moscow; Toronto Maple Leafs; Pittsburgh Penguins; Mighty Ducks of Anaheim; Detroit Red Wings; Washington Capitals
- National team: Russia, Unified Team and Soviet Union
- NHL draft: 160th overall, 1991; Toronto Maple Leafs
- Playing career: 1985–2001

Olympic medal record

Men's Ice hockey

Representing Unified Team
Gold medal – first place	1992 Albertville	Ice hockey

Representing Russia
Silver medal – second place	1998 Nagano	Ice hockey

Dmitri Olegovich Mironov (Russian: Дмитрий Олегович Миронов; born December 25, 1965) is a Russian former professional ice hockey defenseman. He was drafted in the eighth round, 160th overall, by the Toronto Maple Leafs in the 1991 NHL entry draft. He was part of the 1998 Stanley Cup winning Detroit Red Wings.

== Playing career ==
Mironov played in the Soviet Union for seven seasons before moving to the National Hockey League to play for the Maple Leafs. He debuted in Toronto in the 1991–92 season and played there for four seasons. After a brief stint with the Pittsburgh Penguins, Mironov joined the Mighty Ducks of Anaheim. With the Mighty Ducks in the 1997–98 season, Mironov earned a trip to the NHL All-Star Game. Before the season was out, however, Anaheim traded him to the Detroit Red Wings for Jamie Pushor and a draft pick. He won the Stanley Cup with Detroit that season.

Mironov joined the Washington Capitals for the 1998–99 season, and played the final three seasons of his career in Washington. In his NHL career, he appeared in 556 games and tallied 260 points.

Mironov won a gold medal at the 1992 Winter Olympics with the Unified Team, and a silver medal at the 1998 Winter Olympics with the Russian team.

== Personal life ==
His younger brother Boris Mironov also played in the NHL.

He has two children. Son Egor attended and played hockey for Niagara University, while daughter Nicole is a volleyball player.

Mironov was featured on the cover of NHL All-Star Hockey for the Sega Saturn.

== All-Star Game appearances ==
- 1997–1998 season (reserve)

== Career statistics ==
=== Regular season and playoffs ===
			Regular season					Playoffs
Season	Team	League	GP	G	A	Pts	PIM	GP	G	A	Pts	PIM
1984–85	SKA MVO Kalinin	USSR III	—	6	—	—	—	—	—	—	—	—
1985–86	CSKA Moscow	USSR	9	0	1	1	8	—	—	—	—	—
1985–86	SKA MVO Kalinin	USSR II	36	13	6	19	50	—	—	—	—	—
1986–87	CSKA Moscow	USSR	20	1	3	4	10	—	—	—	—	—
1986–87	SKA MVO Kalinin	USSR II	4	2	0	2	4	—	—	—	—	—
1987–88	Krylya Sovetov Moscow	USSR	44	12	6	18	14	—	—	—	—	—
1988–89	Krylya Sovetov Moscow	USSR	44	5	6	11	44	—	—	—	—	—
1989–90	Krylya Sovetov Moscow	USSR	45	4	11	15	34	—	—	—	—	—
1990–91	Krylya Sovetov Moscow	USSR	45	16	12	28	22	—	—	—	—	—
1991–92	Krylya Sovetov Moscow	CIS	35	15	16	31	62	—	—	—	—	—
1991–92	Toronto Maple Leafs	NHL	7	1	0	1	0	—	—	—	—	—
1992–93	Toronto Maple Leafs	NHL	59	7	24	31	40	14	1	2	3	2
1993–94	Toronto Maple Leafs	NHL	76	9	27	36	78	18	6	9	15	6
1994–95	Toronto Maple Leafs	NHL	33	5	12	17	28	6	2	1	3	2
1995–96	Pittsburgh Penguins	NHL	72	3	31	34	88	15	0	1	1	10
1996–97	Pittsburgh Penguins	NHL	15	1	5	6	24	—	—	—	—	—
1996–97	Mighty Ducks of Anaheim	NHL	62	12	34	46	77	11	1	10	11	10
1997–98	Mighty Ducks of Anaheim	NHL	66	6	30	36	115	—	—	—	—	—
1997–98	Detroit Red Wings	NHL	11	2	5	7	4	7	0	3	3	14
1998–99	Washington Capitals	NHL	46	2	14	16	80	—	—	—	—	—
1999–2000	Washington Capitals	NHL	73	3	19	22	28	4	0	0	0	4
2000–01	Washington Capitals	NHL	36	3	5	8	6	—	—	—	—	—
2000–01	Houston Aeros	IHL	3	2	0	2	2	—	—	—	—	—
USSR/CIS totals			242	53	55	108	210	—	—	—	—	—
NHL totals			556	54	206	260	568	75	10	26	36	48

=== International ===
Year	Team	Event	Result	GP	G	A	Pts	PIM
1991	Soviet Union	WC	3rd place, bronze medalist(s)	10	4	2	6	6
1991	Soviet Union	CC	5th	5	0	1	1	4
1992	Unified Team	OG	1st place, gold medalist(s)	8	3	1	4	6
1992	Russia	WC	5th	6	1	1	2	6
1998	Russia	OG	2nd place, silver medalist(s)	6	0	3	3	0
2000	Russia	WC	11th	6	0	0	0	4
Senior totals				41	8	8	16	26
