= Ski jumping at the 1992 Winter Olympics – Normal hill individual =

Men's normal hill individual at the XVI Olympic Winter Games
- Pictogram for ski jumping
- Venue: Tremplin du Praz
- Dates: February 9, 1992
- Competitors: 58 from 16 nations
- winning score: 222.8

Medalists
1st place, gold medalist(s)		Ernst Vettori; Austria
2nd place, silver medalist(s)		Martin Höllwarth; Austria
3rd place, bronze medalist(s)		Toni Nieminen; Finland

The men's normal hill individual ski jumping competition for the 1992 Winter Olympics was held in Tremplin du Praz. It occurred on 9 February.

== Results ==
Rank	Bib	Athlete	Country	Jump 1	Jump 2	Total
1st place, gold medalist(s)	20	Ernst Vettori	Austria	111.8	111.0	222.8
2nd place, silver medalist(s)	37	Martin Höllwarth	Austria	116.8	101.3	218.1
3rd place, bronze medalist(s)	55	Toni Nieminen	Finland	112.3	104.7	217.0
4	9	Heinz Kuttin	Austria	106.3	108.1	214.4
5	34	Mika Laitinen	Finland	106.3	107.3	213.6
6	47	Andreas Felder	Austria	110.2	103.3	213.5
7	50	Heiko Hunger	Germany	108.7	102.9	211.6
8	45	Didier Mollard	France	103.7	106.0	209.7
9	33	Jens Weissflog	Germany	104.9	103.6	208.5
10	52	Jiří Parma	Czechoslovakia	109.2	98.7	207.9
11	38	Mikhail Yesin	Unified Team	105.8	98.9	204.7
12	32	Samo Gostiša	Slovenia	101.4	100.4	201.8
13	56	Jim Holland	United States	104.5	96.6	201.1
14	57	Masahiko Harada	Japan	98.6	102.4	201.0
15	36	Jaroslav Sakala	Czechoslovakia	101.1	99.7	200.8
16	8	Risto Laakkonen	Finland	106.8	93.9	200.7
17	48	Mikael Martinsson	Sweden	99.2	100.7	199.9
18	16	Matjaž Zupan	Slovenia	97.5	99.8	197.3
19	31	Nicolas Jean-Prost	France	97.6	98.1	195.7
20	54	Stefan Zünd	Switzerland	100.8	94.0	194.8
21	53	Franci Petek	Slovenia	93.7	99.8	193.5
22	49	Ivan Lunardi	Italy	104.1	89.1	193.2
23	14	František Jež	Czechoslovakia	99.7	93.0	192.7
24	40	Sylvain Freiholz	Switzerland	97.8	93.4	191.2
25	26	Dionis Vodnyev	Unified Team	88.7	102.4	191.1
26	3	Primož Kopač	Slovenia	98.2	91.4	189.6
27	19	Dieter Thoma	Germany	93.2	96.2	189.4
28	30	Ted Langlois	United States	91.5	97.3	188.8
28	18	Jiro Kamiharako	Japan	94.0	94.8	188.8
28	43	Magnus Westman	Sweden	97.9	90.9	188.8
31	42	Noriaki Kasai	Japan	89.0	98.1	187.1
32	51	Andrey Verveykin	Unified Team	91.5	95.3	186.8
32	24	Steve Delaup	France	92.1	94.7	186.8
34	12	Jens Deimel	Germany	92.0	94.4	186.4
35	13	Øyvind Berg	Norway	90.1	95.9	186.0
35	21	Staffan Tällberg	Sweden	91.5	94.5	186.0
37	41	Roberto Cecon	Italy	94.3	91.2	185.5
38	5	Bryan Sanders	United States	99.1	85.7	184.8
39	4	Kenji Suda	Japan	93.5	91.2	184.7
40	44	Emil Zografski	Bulgaria	95.3	88.0	183.3
41	27	Martin Trunz	Switzerland	92.0	90.8	182.8
42	59	Horst Bulau	Canada	91.3	90.1	181.4
43	1	Jérôme Gay	France	88.7	92.2	180.9
44	6	Markus Gähler	Switzerland	90.8	89.4	180.2
45	58	Lasse Ottesen	Norway	107.4	72.0	179.4
46	35	Ron Richards	Canada	91.9	84.2	176.1
47	11	Jan Boklöv	Sweden	84.0	91.5	175.5
48	2	Tomáš Goder	Czechoslovakia	83.9	91.4	175.3
49	7	Magne Johansen	Norway	86.7	87.6	174.3
50	46	Vladimir Breychev	Bulgaria	87.6	85.0	172.6
51	29	Bob Holme	United States	83.7	87.6	171.3
52	28	Ivo Pertile	Italy	84.6	85.1	169.7
53	17	Ari-Pekka Nikkola	Finland	82.6	80.2	162.8
54	10	Yury Dudarev	Unified Team	84.9	77.6	162.5
55	15	Kirk Allen	Canada	79.4	82.6	162.0
56	25	Zakhari Sotirov	Bulgaria	78.9	78.3	157.2
57	23	Virgil Neagoe	Romania	72.6	71.2	143.8
58	39	Espen Bredesen	Norway	73.1	54.0	127.1
