= Ski jumping at the 1992 Winter Olympics – Large hill individual =

Men's large hill individual at the XVI Olympic Winter Games
- Pictogram for ski jumping
- Venue: Tremplin du Praz
- Dates: February 16, 1992
- Competitors: 59 from 17 nations
- Winning score: 239.5

Medalists
1st place, gold medalist(s)		Toni Nieminen; Finland
2nd place, silver medalist(s)		Martin Höllwarth; Austria
3rd place, bronze medalist(s)		Heinz Kuttin; Austria

The men's large hill individual ski jumping competition for the 1992 Winter Olympics was held in Tremplin du Praz. It occurred on 16 February.

== Results ==
Rank	Bib	Athlete	Country	Jump 1	Jump 2	Total
1st place, gold medalist(s)	57	Toni Nieminen	Finland	118.8	120.7	239.5
2nd place, silver medalist(s)	37	Martin Höllwarth	Austria	116.7	110.6	227.3
3rd place, bronze medalist(s)	56	Heinz Kuttin	Austria	112.5	102.3	214.8
4	49	Masahiko Harada	Japan	102.4	108.9	211.3
5	58	Jiří Parma	Czechoslovakia	101.1	96.9	198.0
6	3	Steve Delaup	France	92.9	92.7	185.6
7	55	Ivan Lunardi	Italy	99.2	86.0	185.2
8	50	Franci Petek	Slovenia	94.8	82.3	177.1
9	1	Andreas Felder	Austria	89.5	87.4	176.9
10	48	Mikhail Yesin	Unified Team	96.2	80.3	176.5
11	2	Christof Duffner	Germany	98.3	78.0	176.3
12	59	Jim Holland	United States	90.0	85.1	175.1
13	29	František Jež	Czechoslovakia	91.5	79.8	171.3
14	33	Sylvain Freiholz	Switzerland	77.6	93.4	171.0
15	21	Ernst Vettori	Austria	81.6	89.3	170.9
16	52	Mikael Martinsson	Sweden	89.1	79.4	168.5
17	30	Kenji Suda	Japan	91.1	77.0	168.1
18	13	Magne Johansen	Norway	79.5	86.8	166.3
19	4	Mika Laitinen	Finland	97.8	68.2	166.0
20	9	Tomáš Goder	Czechoslovakia	90.6	74.2	164.8
21	24	Risto Laakkonen	Finland	83.8	80.4	164.2
22	44	Samo Gostiša	Slovenia	72.5	86.4	158.9
23	47	Stefan Zünd	Switzerland	87.1	71.8	158.9
24	22	Dionis Vodnyev	Unified Team	83.6	72.7	156.3
25	45	Jiro Kamiharako	Japan	79.5	76.0	155.5
26	5	Noriaki Kasai	Japan	82.1	72.3	154.4
27	15	Matjaž Zupan	Slovenia	81.6	72.4	154.0
27	20	Staffan Tällberg	Sweden	84.6	69.4	154.0
29	34	Andrey Verveykin	Unified Team	79.1	72.7	151.8
30	43	Ari-Pekka Nikkola	Finland	79.1	70.3	149.4
31	6	Martin Trunz	Switzerland	87.0	60.4	147.4
32	36	Roberto Cecon	Italy	68.0	73.9	141.9
33	27	Jens Weissflog	Germany	60.5	80.8	141.3
34	39	Øyvind Berg	Norway	73.6	67.0	140.6
35	26	Markus Gähler	Switzerland	77.0	61.7	138.7
36	31	Bryan Sanders	United States	61.2	75.9	137.1
37	8	Bob Holme	United States	71.1	66.0	137.1
38	28	Ivo Pertile	Italy	71.2	62.0	133.2
39	41	Dieter Thoma	Germany	68.9	63.7	132.6
40	46	Didier Mollard	France	89.8	42.4	132.2
41	42	Jaroslav Sakala	Czechoslovakia	85.7	45.7	131.4
42	7	Damjan Fras	Slovenia	79.6	50.6	130.2
43	38	Ron Richards	Canada	69.8	58.9	128.7
44	32	Magnus Westman	Sweden	70.9	57.0	127.9
45	25	Lasse Ottesen	Norway	60.3	66.5	126.8
46	10	Vladimir Breychev	Bulgaria	61.4	64.9	126.3
47	12	Yury Dudarev	Unified Team	64.8	56.1	120.9
48	14	Ted Langlois	United States	57.2	61.2	118.4
49	16	Zbigniew Klimowski	Poland	55.0	62.9	117.9
50	11	Per-Inge Tällberg	Sweden	65.1	41.0	106.1
51	40	Nicolas Jean-Prost	France	69.5	35.2	104.7
52	51	Horst Bulau	Canada	56.8	40.9	97.7
53	23	Kirk Allen	Canada	56.7	37.1	93.8
54	17	Jérôme Gay	France	17.0	76.5	93.5
55	18	Zakhari Sotirov	Bulgaria	38.0	54.3	92.3
56	35	Emil Zografski	Bulgaria	35.0	47.4	82.4
57	53	Espen Bredesen	Norway	45.4	28.7	74.1
58	19	Virgil Neagoe	Romania	29.4	34.7	64.1
-	54	Heiko Hunger	Germany	-2.2	-	DNF
