= Sergei Kruglov =

Sergei Kruglov may refer to:

- Sergey Kruglov (bobsleigh) (born 1960), Russian Olympic bobsledder
- Sergei Kruglov (politician) (1907–1977), Soviet politician
- Sergei Kruglov (poet) (born 1966), Russian poet
- Sergei Kruglov (sport shooter) (born 1985), Russian Olympic sport shooter
