= Virgil Neagoe =

Romanian ski jumper

Personal information
- Nationality: Romanian
- Born: 3 July 1970 (age 56)

Sport
- Sport: Ski jumping

Virgil Neagoe (born 3 July 1970) is a Romanian ski jumper. He competed in the normal hill and large hill events at the 1992 Winter Olympics.
