= Vitaly Andreyev =

Russian alpine skier (born 1969)

Personal information
- Nationality: Russian
- Born: 3 September 1969 (age 55); Leningrad, Soviet Union

Sport
- Sport: Alpine skiing

Vitaly Andreyev (born 3 September 1969) is a Russian alpine skier. He competed in three events at the 1992 Winter Olympics, representing the Unified Team.
