= Zakhari Sotirov =

Bulgarian ski jumper

Personal information
- Nationality: Bulgarian
- Born: 3 January 1973 (age 52)

Sport
- Sport: Ski jumping

Zakhari Sotirov (born 3 January 1973) is a Bulgarian ski jumper. He competed in the normal hill and large hill events at the 1992 Winter Olympics.
