= Andrei Trefilov =

Russian ice hockey player

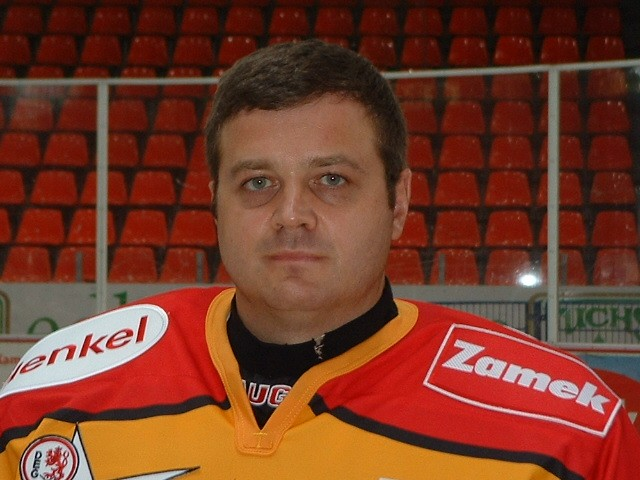
- Born: 31 August 1969 (age 56) Kirovo-Chepetsk, Soviet Union
- Height: 6 ft 0 in (183 cm)
- Weight: 205 lb (93 kg; 14 st 9 lb)
- Position: Goaltender
- Caught: Left
- Played for: Olimpiya Kirovo-Chepetsk; HC Dynamo Moscow; Calgary Flames; Buffalo Sabres; Ak Bars Kazan; Chicago Blackhawks; DEG Metro Stars
- National team: Soviet Union, Unified Team and Russia
- NHL draft: 261st overall, 1991; Calgary Flames
- Playing career: 1985–2006

Andrei Trefilov
Medal record

Representing Soviet Union

World Championships
Bronze medal – third place	1991 Finland	

Representing CIS

Winter Olympics
Gold medal – first place	1992 Albertville	

Representing Russia

Winter Olympics
Silver medal – second place	1998 Nagano	

World Championships
Gold medal – first place	1993 Germany	

Andrei Viktorovich Trefilov (Russian: Андрей Викторович Трефилов); born 31 August 1969) is a Russian retired ice hockey goaltender and a sports agent. He played in the National Hockey League between 1992 and 1999 with the Calgary Flames, Buffalo Sabres, and Chicago Blackhawks. The rest of his career, which lasted from 1986 to 2006, was spent in the North American minor leagues and in Europe.

Internationally Trefilov first played for the Soviet national team at the 1991 Men's Ice Hockey World Championships and 1991 Canada Cup, where he shared goal tending with Alexei Marjin. He also represented the Unified Team at the 1992 Winter Olympics, winning a gold medal, and then the Russian national team at the 1992, 1993 and 1996 World Championships, as well as the 1998 Winter Olympics, winning a silver.

== Playing career ==
Trefilov played several seasons in the Soviet Championship League. He was selected in the 12th round of the 1991 NHL entry draft, 261st overall, by the Calgary Flames. He started his National Hockey League career in 1993 with the Calgary Flames and he went on to spend time with the Chicago Blackhawks, and Buffalo Sabres. He was one of the goaltenders for the Unified Team that won the gold medal at the 1992 Winter Olympics. He also played for Russia in two Olympic Winter Games. His last club was the DEG Metro Stars of the Deutsche Eishockey Liga in Germany, where he played until 2006.

As a member of the IHL's Detroit Vipers, Trefilov shared the James Norris Memorial Trophy with Kevin Weekes for allowing the fewest goals in the IHL in 1999 and won the Norman R. "Bud" Poile Trophy as the IHL playoff most valuable player in 2000 with the Chicago Wolves. He was also the starting goaltender for the Buffalo Sabres in the last game at Buffalo Memorial Auditorium, on 14 April 1996.

== Career statistics ==
=== Regular season and playoffs ===
			Regular season									Playoffs
Season	Team	League	GP	W	L	T	MIN	GA	SO	GAA	SV%	GP	W	L	MIN	GA	SO	GAA	SV%
1986–87	Olimpiya Kirovo-Chepetsk	USSR-3	—	—	—	—	—	—	—	—	—	—	—	—	—	—	—	—	—
1987–88	Olimpiya Kirovo-Chepetsk	USSR-3	—	—	—	—	—	—	—	—	—	—	—	—	—	—	—	—	—
1989–90	Dizelist Penza	USSR-3	14	—	—	—	—	—	—	—	—	—	—	—	—	—	—	—	—
1989–90	Dynamo-2 Moscow	USSR-3	16	—	—	—	—	—	—	—	—	—	—	—	—	—	—	—	—
1990–91	Dynamo Moscow	USSR	20	—	—	—	1070	36	0	2.01	—	—	—	—	—	—	—	—	—
1990–91	Dynamo-2 Moscow	USSR-3	14	—	—	—	—	—	—	—	—	—	—	—	—	—	—	—	—
1991–92	Dynamo Moscow	USSR	28	—	—	—	1326	35	0	1.58	—	7	—	—	—	—	—	—	—
1991–92	Dynamo-2 Moscow	USSR-3	3	—	—	—	—	—	—	—	—	—	—	—	—	—	—	—	—
1992–93	Calgary Flames	NHL	1	0	0	1	65	5	0	4.62	.872	—	—	—	—	—	—	—	—
1992–93	Salt Lake Golden Eagles	IHL	44	23	17	3	2536	135	0	3.19	.896	—	—	—	—	—	—	—	—
1993–94	Calgary Flames	NHL	11	3	4	2	623	26	2	2.51	.915	—	—	—	—	—	—	—	—
1993–94	Saint John Flames	AHL	28	10	10	7	1629	93	0	3.42	.894	—	—	—	—	—	—	—	—
1994–95	Calgary Flames	NHL	6	0	3	0	236	16	0	4.07	.877	—	—	—	—	—	—	—	—
1994–95	Saint John Flames	AHL	7	1	5	1	383	20	0	3.13	.915	—	—	—	—	—	—	—	—
1995–96	Buffalo Sabres	NHL	22	8	8	1	1094	64	0	3.51	.903	—	—	—	—	—	—	—	—
1995–96	Rochester Americans	AHL	5	4	1	0	299	13	0	2.61	.906	—	—	—	—	—	—	—	—
1996–97	Buffalo Sabres	NHL	3	0	2	0	159	10	0	3.78	.898	1	0	0	6	0	0	0.00	1.000
1997–98	Chicago Blackhawks	NHL	6	1	4	0	300	17	0	3.41	.883	—	—	—	—	—	—	—	—
1997–98	Rochester Americans	AHL	3	1	0	1	138	6	0	2.60	.924	—	—	—	—	—	—	—	—
1997–98	Indianapolis Ice	IHL	1	0	1	0	59	3	0	3.03	.914	—	—	—	—	—	—	—	—
1998–99	Chicago Blackhawks	NHL	1	0	1	0	25	4	0	9.70	.800	—	—	—	—	—	—	—	—
1998–99	Calgary Flames	NHL	4	0	3	0	162	11	0	4.08	.869	—	—	—	—	—	—	—	—
1998–99	Indianapolis Ice	IHL	18	9	6	2	986	39	0	2.37	.934	—	—	—	—	—	—	—	—
1998–99	Detroit Vipers	IHL	27	17	8	2	1613	53	3	1.97	.926	10	6	4	647	22	0	2.04	.921
1998–99	Ak Bars Kazan	RSL	3	2	0	0	160	7	1	2.63	.907	—	—	—	—	—	—	—	—
1998–99	Ak Bars-3 Kazan	RUS-3	2	—	—	—	—	—	—	—	—	—	—	—	—	—	—	—	—
1999–00	Chicago Wolves	IHL	37	21	9	3	2060	81	3	2.36	.919	9	7	1	489	11	1	1.35	.950
2000–01	Düsseldorfer EG	DEL	50	—	—	—	2864	120	2	2.51	.916	—	—	—	—	—	—	—	—
2001–02	DEG Metro Stars	DEL	58	—	—	—	3469	131	7	2.27	.912	—	—	—	—	—	—	—	—
2002–03	DEG Metro Stars	DEL	37	—	—	—	2216	79	5	2.14	.912	5	1	4	302	17	1	3.38	.853
2003–04	DEG Metro Stars	DEL	35	—	—	—	2095	78	4	2.23	.908	4	0	4	252	15	0	3.57	.876
2004–05	DEG Metro Stars	DEL	30	—	—	—	1743	85	3	2.92	.900	—	—	—	—	—	—	—	—
2005–06	DEG Metro Stars	DEL	23	—	—	—	1234	44	0	2.14	.918	14	7	7	839	43	0	3.08	.854
NHL totals			54	12	25	4	2662	153	2	3.45	.897	1	0	0	6	0	0	0.00	1.000

=== International ===
Year	Team	Event	GP	W	L	T	MIN	GA	SO	GAA	SV%
1991	Soviet Union	WC	8	5	1	2	400	18	0	2.70	.875
1991	Soviet Union	CC	1	0	0	0	4	0	0	0.00	1.000
1992	Unified Team	OLY	4	0	0	0	39	2	0	3.08	.875
1992	Russia	WC	2	1	0	0	66	2	0	1.82	—
1993	Russia	WC	6	4	2	0	360	14	0	2.33	.917
1996	Russia	WC	5	4	1	0	310	7	0	1.35	.956
1996	Russia	WCH	4	2	1	0	200	9	1	3.00	.906
1998	Russia	OLY	2	1	0	0	69	4	0	3.45	.895
Senior totals			32	17	5	2	1448	56	1	2.32	—
