= Tetiana Lebedeva =

Ukrainian alpine skier (born 1973)

Personal information
- Nationality: Ukrainian
- Born: 20 May 1973 (age 53) Kyiv, Soviet Union

Sport
- Sport: Alpine skiing

Tetiana Lebedeva (born 20 May 1973) is a Ukrainian alpine skier. She competed in three events at the 1992 Winter Olympics, representing the Unified Team.
