= CIS national ice hockey team =

Commonwealth of Independent States team

Commonwealth of Independent States
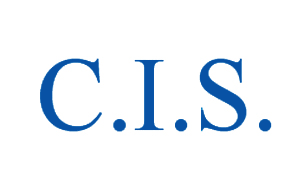
- Most games: Andrei Khomutov (13)
- Most points: Andrei Khomutov (17)
- IIHF code: CIS

First international
- Austria 2–7 CIS (Feldkirch, Austria; 19 January 1992); Last international Unified Team 3–1 Canada (Méribel, France; 23 February 1992)

Biggest win
- France 0–8 Unified Team (Méribel, France; 14 February 1992)

Biggest defeat
- Switzerland 3–0 CIS (Rapperswil, Switzerland; 4 February 1992)

Olympics
- Appearances: 1 (first in 1992)
- Medals: Gold (1992)

International record (W–L–T)
- 11–2–0

Medal record

Olympic Games
Gold medal – first place	1992 Albertville	

The CIS national ice hockey team was a national ice hockey team that represented the Commonwealth of Independent States. Essentially the former Soviet team under a different name, the CIS team existed in the few months between the dissolution of the Soviet Union and the formation of new ice hockey federations for the former Soviet states, now independent countries. Most notably, the team competed at the 1992 Winter Olympics as part of the Unified Team, winning the gold medal. However, the International Ice Hockey Federation would later attribute this gold medal to Russia as the successor state. The International Olympic Committee does not attribute that medal to Russia. After the Olympics, the CIS team ceased to exist and was replaced by the Russian team. In the 13 games the CIS played, they won 11 and lost 2.

== History ==
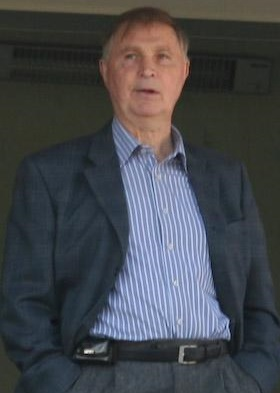
Viktor Tikhonov, who coached the Soviet national team, served as the coach for the Unified Team at the Olympics.

The Soviet Union was dissolved in December 1991, only weeks before the start of the 1992 Winter Olympics in Albertville, France. As a result, there was no time to send a replacement for the Soviet national team, who was expected to compete at the Olympics. In effect, the Soviet team participated, under the name "Unified Team" and with the "CCCP" on their uniforms removed, leaving a blank spot. Rather than the Soviet national anthem, the Olympic Hymn was played, and the Olympic flag was used instead of the Soviet flag.

Many of the best Soviet players had since left the former Soviet Union for the National Hockey League (NHL), which did not stop play for the Olympics. Thus, the team used players from the Russian and Swiss leagues instead, and head coach Viktor Tikhonov, known for his authoritarian style of coaching, was forced to modify his strategy, as he had no leverage over the players. Despite the absence of superstars, the CIS team had no problems with talent, boasting experienced veterans Vyacheslav Bykov, Andrei Khomutov and Alexei Zhamnov. The team was composed almost entirely of Russians, with Lithuanian-born Darius Kasparaitis and Ukrainian-born Alexei Zhitnik the only non-Russians. Kasparaitis would later represent Russia in international competition. In 2017, he switched to join the Lithuanian national team. Zhitnik would represent Russia throughout his career.

They played in three friendlies against Austria, Canada, and Italy in January 1992. They defeated the Austrians and Canadians 7-2 each, and the Italians by a score of 4–2.

The national team next took part in the Nissan Cup, hosted by Switzerland. They defeated Finland in the semifinals 6–2, but were surprised by the Swiss hosts in the final, losing by a score of 3–0.

At the 1992 Winter Olympics held in Albertville, France, the national team finished with a 7–1 record, and won the gold medal by defeating Canada 3–1 in the final.

After the Olympics, the team was dissolved and replaced by the Russian national team and other national teams for the independent post-Soviet states.

== Olympic record ==
Games	GP	W	L	T	GF	GA	Coach	Captain	Finish
1956–1988	As Soviet Union								
(France) 1992 Albertville (As Unified Team)
(France) 1992 Albertville (As Unified Team)	8	7	1	0	46	14	Viktor Tikhonov	Vyacheslav Bykov	Gold
1994 – present	As Russia								

== Roster ==
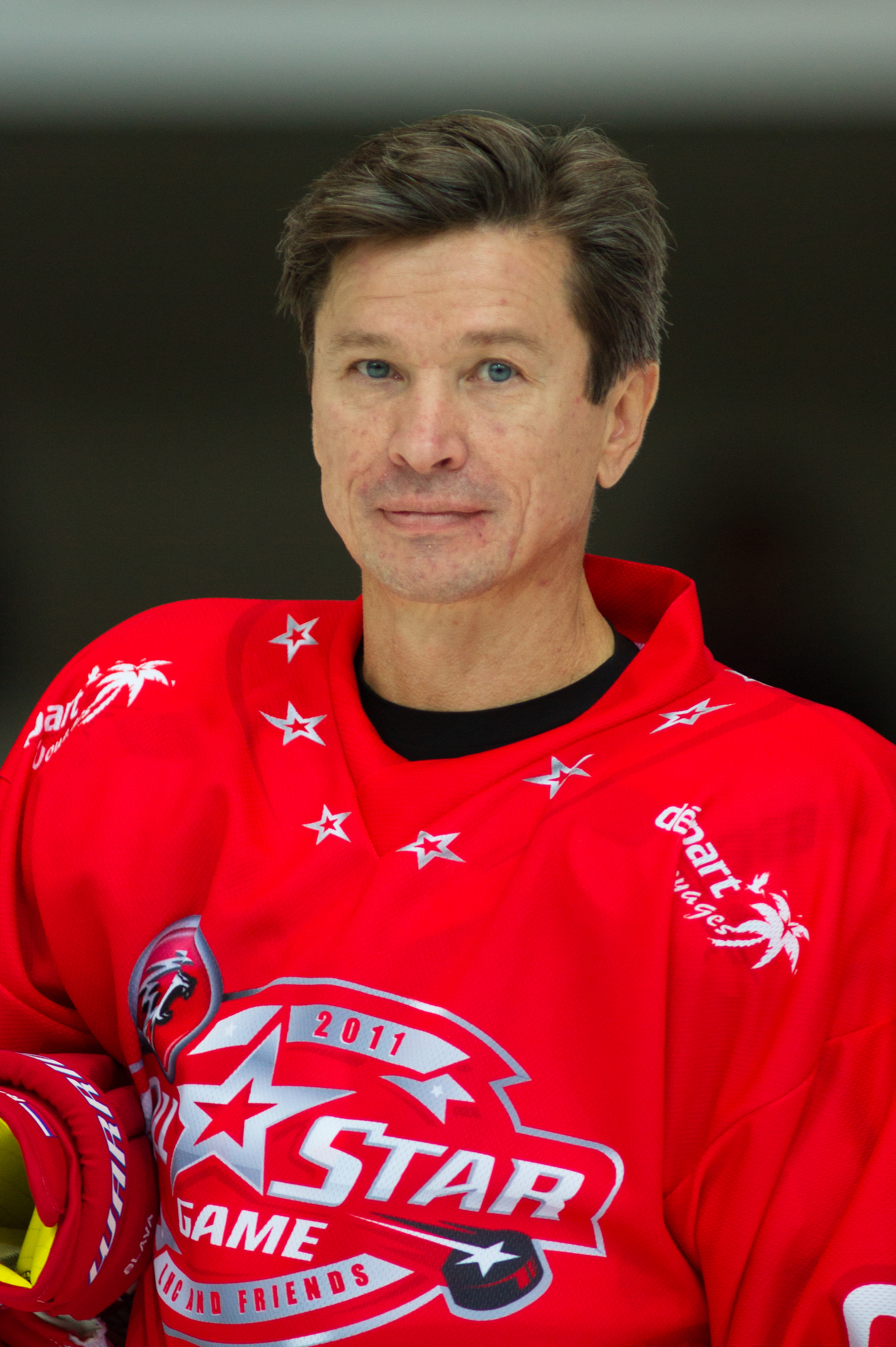
Vyacheslav Bykov served as captain of the Unified Team.

A total of 20 skaters and 2 goalies players played for the Unified Team at the 1992 Winter Olympics. Nikolai Borschevsky and Andrei Khomutov tied for the lead in goals, with 7 each, while Khomutov and Vyacheslav Bykov had the most assists, 7. Khomutov had the most points on the team, with 14. While named to the team, Nikolai Khabibulin did not play in any games.

=== Skaters ===
Number	Position	Player	Club	GP	G	A	Pts	PIM
2	D	Dmitri Yushkevich	Dynamo Moscow	8	1	2	3	—
3	D	Igor Kravchuk	CSKA Moscow	8	3	2	5	—
4	D	Vladimir Malakhov	CSKA Moscow	8	3	0	3	—
5	D	Dmitri Mironov	Krylya Sovetov Moscow	8	3	1	4	—
6	D	Darius Kasparaitis	Dynamo Moscow	8	0	2	2	—
7	D	Sergei Bautin	Dynamo Moscow	8	0	0	0	—
8	C	Igor Boldin	Spartak Moscow	8	2	6	8	—
10	LW	Sergei Petrenko	Dynamo Moscow	8	3	2	5	—
11	LW	Evgeny Davydov	CSKA Moscow	8	3	3	6	—
12	RW	Nikolai Borschevsky	Spartak Moscow	8	7	2	9	—
13	LW	Yuri Khmylev	Krylya Sovetov Moscow	8	4	6	10	—
14	RW	Alexei Kovalev	Dynamo Moscow	8	1	2	3	—
15	RW	Andrei Khomutov	Fribourg-Gottéron	8	7	7	14	—
16	D	Sergei Zubov	CSKA Moscow	8	0	1	1	—
22	C	Vyacheslav Butsayev	CSKA Moscow	8	1	1	2	—
23	D	Alexei Zhitnik	CSKA Moscow	8	1	0	1	—
24	LW	Vitali Prokhorov	Spartak Moscow	8	2	4	6	—
26	C	Alexei Zhamnov	Dynamo Moscow	8	0	3	3	—
27	C	Vyacheslav Bykov	Fribourg-Gottéron	8	4	7	11	—
29	RW	Andrei Kovalenko	CSKA Moscow	8	1	1	2	—

=== Goaltenders ===
Number	Player	Club	GP	W	L	Min	GA	GAA	SV%	SO
1	Andrei Trefilov	Dynamo Moscow	4	—	—	—	—	—	—	—
20	Mikhail Shtalenkov	Dynamo Moscow	8	—	—	—	—	—	—	—
30	Nikolai Khabibulin	CSKA Moscow	—	—	—	—	—	—	—	—
