= Aleksey Maslov =

Russian alpine skier (born 1966)

Personal information
- Nationality: Russian
- Born: 7 February 1966 (age 59); Chusovoy, Soviet Union

Sport
- Sport: Alpine skiing

Aleksey Maslov (born 7 February 1966) is a Russian alpine skier. He competed in three events at the 1992 Winter Olympics, representing the Unified Team.
