= Kirk Allen (ski jumper) =

Canadian ski jumper

Personal information
- Born: 3 May 1971 (age 55) Calgary, Alberta, Canada

Sport
- Sport: Ski jumping

Kirk Allen (born 3 May 1971) is a Canadian ski jumper. He competed in the normal hill and large hill events at the 1992 Winter Olympics.
