= Nissan Cup =

- Most recent season or competition: 1994 Nissan Cup (November)
- Sport: ice hockey
- Founded: 1988
- Folded: 1994
- No. of teams: 3-4
- Country: Switzerland
- Continent: Europe
- Most titles: Finland; Sweden (2 triumphs each)
- Sponsor: Nissan

Nissan Cup (French: Coupe Nissan) was an ice hockey tournament for men's national teams, which was played in Switzerland between 1988-1994. Originally played in November, the tournament was later moved to February, and finally moved back to November.

== Tournaments ==
Year	Place(s)	1	2	3	Sources
1988	Bern	Sweden	Switzerland	Finland	
1989	Zürich	Finland	Switzerland	West Germany	
1990	Zürich, Fribourg, Bern	Soviet Union	Switzerland	Canada	
1992	Rapperswil, Leukerbad, Fribourg	Switzerland	CIS	Finland	
1993	Kreuzlingen, Kloten, Zug, Schwenningen, Rapperswil	Germany	Canada	Switzerland	
1994 (February)	Kreuzlingen, Küssnacht, Rapperswil + Schwenningen in Germany	Finland	Switzerland	Germany	
1994 (November)	Fribourg	Sweden	Russia	Finland	
