= Vyacheslav Butsayev =

Russian ice hockey player (born 1970)

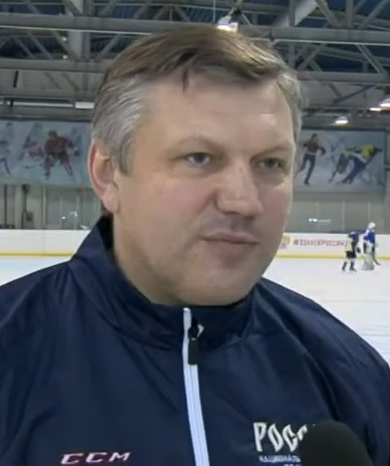
- Butsayev in 2017
- Born: June 13, 1970 (age 56) Tolyatti, Soviet Union
- Height: 6 ft 0 in (183 cm)
- Weight: 198 lb (90 kg; 14 st 2 lb)
- Position: Centre
- Shot: Left
- Played for: CSKA Moscow; Philadelphia Flyers; San Jose Sharks; Mighty Ducks of Anaheim; Florida Panthers; Ottawa Senators; Tampa Bay Lightning; Lada Togliatti; Södertälje SK; Färjestads BK; Lokomotiv Yaroslavl; Severstal Cherepovets; HC MVD
- National team: Soviet Union, Unified Team and Russia
- NHL draft: 109th overall, 1990; Philadelphia Flyers
- Playing career: 1987–2007

Vyacheslav Gennadievich Butsayev (Russian: Вячеслав Геннадьевич Буцаев; born June 13, 1970) is a Russian former professional ice hockey player. He was drafted by the Philadelphia Flyers in the sixth round, 109th overall, of the 1990 NHL entry draft. He last played for HC Dmitrov in Russia's Vysshaya Liga. Vyacheslav is the brother of former professional hockey player Yuri Butsayev.

== Playing career ==
Butsayev played in the Soviet Union for several seasons before coming to North America, including three seasons with powerhouse club HC CSKA Moscow. He joined the Flyers for the 1992–93 season, playing in 52 games and scoring 16 points.

Butsayev was a journeyman in the NHL, playing for the Flyers, San Jose Sharks, Mighty Ducks of Anaheim, Florida Panthers, Ottawa Senators, and Tampa Bay Lightning. He returned to Russia for the 2001–02 season and has played there since.

In his NHL career, Butsayev appeared in 132 games. He scored 17 goals and added 26 assists.

== Coaching career ==
After retirement as a player, he worked for HC CSKA Moscow - as an assistant coach and (acting) head coach of the first team, and as a junior A (MHL) team's coach - winning Kharlamov Cup in 2011. In 2014, he was appointed as a head coach of the newly created KHL expansion team - Sochi Leopards.

== Career statistics ==
=== Regular season and playoffs ===
			Regular season					Playoffs
Season	Team	League	GP	G	A	Pts	PIM	GP	G	A	Pts	PIM
1986–87	Torpedo Tolyatti	USSR II	1	0	0	0	0	—	—	—	—	—
1987–88	Torpedo Tolyatti	USSR II	37	8	4	12	14	—	—	—	—	—
1988–89	Torpedo Tolyatti	USSR II	60	14	7	21	32	—	—	—	—	—
1989–90	CSKA Moscow	USSR	48	14	4	18	30	—	—	—	—	—
1990–91	CSKA Moscow	USSR	46	14	9	23	32	—	—	—	—	—
1991–92	CSKA Moscow	CIS	28	12	9	21	18	8	0	4	4	8
1992–93	CSKA Moscow	IHL	5	3	4	7	6	—	—	—	—	—
1992–93	Philadelphia Flyers	NHL	52	2	14	16	61	—	—	—	—	—
1992–93	Hershey Bears	AHL	24	8	10	18	51	—	—	—	—	—
1993–94	Philadelphia Flyers	NHL	47	12	9	21	58	—	—	—	—	—
1993–94	San Jose Sharks	NHL	12	0	2	2	10	—	—	—	—	—
1994–95	Lada Togliatti	IHL	9	2	6	8	6	—	—	—	—	—
1994–95	San Jose Sharks	NHL	6	2	0	2	0	—	—	—	—	—
1994–95	Kansas City Blades	IHL	13	3	4	7	12	3	0	0	0	2
1995–96	Mighty Ducks of Anaheim	NHL	7	1	0	1	0	—	—	—	—	—
1995–96	Baltimore Bandits	AHL	62	23	42	65	80	12	4	8	12	28
1996–97	Södertälje SK	SEL	16	2	4	6	61	—	—	—	—	—
1996–97	Färjestads BK	SEL	24	4	3	7	47	8	3	4	7	41
1997–98	Fort Wayne Komets	IHL	76	36	51	87	128	4	2	2	4	4
1998–99	Fort Wayne Komets	IHL	71	28	44	72	123	2	1	0	1	4
1998–99	Florida Panthers	NHL	1	0	0	0	2	—	—	—	—	—
1998–99	Ottawa Senators	NHL	2	0	1	1	2	—	—	—	—	—
1999–2000	Tampa Bay Lightning	NHL	2	0	0	0	0	—	—	—	—	—
1999–2000	Ottawa Senators	NHL	3	0	0	0	0	—	—	—	—	—
1999–2000	Grand Rapids Griffins	IHL	68	28	35	63	85	17	4	12	16	24
2000–01	Grand Rapids Griffins	IHL	75	33	35	68	65	10	1	5	6	18
2001–02	Lokomotiv Yaroslavl	RSL	29	8	15	23	28	9	3	1	4	4
2002–03	Lokomotiv Yaroslavl	RSL	46	13	15	28	38	9	3	6	9	10
2003–04	Lokomotiv Yaroslavl	RSL	54	9	6	15	56	3	1	0	1	2
2004–05	Severstal Cherepovets	RSL	31	3	6	9	22	—	—	—	—	—
2004–05	CSKA Moscow	RSL	24	4	7	11	10	—	—	—	—	—
2005–06	HC MVD	RSL	49	12	14	26	68	—	—	—	—	—
2006–07	HC Dmitrov	RUS II	19	3	7	10	26	—	—	—	—	—
NHL totals			132	17	26	43	133	—	—	—	—	—
IHL totals			303	128	169	297	413	36	8	19	27	52
RSL totals			232	49	64	113	224	21	7	7	14	16

=== International ===
Year	Team	Event	Result	GP	G	A	Pts	PIM
1990	Soviet Union	WJC	2nd place, silver medalist(s)	7	3	4	7	14
1991	Soviet Union	WC	3rd place, bronze medalist(s)	10	4	1	5	10
1991	Soviet Union	CC	5th	5	2	0	2	0
1992	Unified Team	OG	1st place, gold medalist(s)	8	1	1	2	4
1992	Russia	WC	5th	6	0	1	1	10
1993	Russia	WC	1st place, gold medalist(s)	8	1	2	3	8
1997	Russia	WC	4th	9	2	2	4	8
2002	Russia	WC	2nd place, silver medalist(s)	9	1	2	3	6
2004	Russia	WC	10th	5	0	1	1	4
Senior totals				60	11	10	21	50
