= Svetlana Novikova =

Russian alpine skier (born 1974)

Personal information
- Nationality: Russian
- Born: 5 September 1974 (age 50); Yelizovo, Soviet Union

Sport
- Sport: Alpine skiing

Svetlana Novikova (born 5 September 1974) is a Russian alpine skier. She competed in two events at the 1992 Winter Olympics, representing the Unified Team.
