= Andrey Gorokhov (bobsledder) =

Russian bobsledder (born 1968)

Personal information
- Nationality: Russian
- Born: 29 June 1968 (age 56)

Sport
- Sport: Bobsleigh

Andrey Gorokhov (born 29 June 1968) is a Russian bobsledder. He competed at the 1992 Winter Olympics and the 1994 Winter Olympics.
