= Aleksandr Golubyov =

Russian cross-country skier

Personal information
- Nationality: Russian
- Born: 27 March 1964 (age 60)

Sport
- Sport: Cross-country skiing

Aleksandr Golubyov (born 27 March 1964) is a Russian cross-country skier. He competed in the men's 30 kilometre classical event at the 1992 Winter Olympics.
