= Sergey Kruglov (bobsleigh) =

Russian bobsledder

Personal information
- Nationality: Russian
- Born: 24 February 1960 (age 65)

Sport
- Sport: Bobsleigh

Sergey Kruglov (born 24 February 1960) is a Russian bobsledder. He competed at the 1992 Winter Olympics, representing the Unified Team, and the 1994 Winter Olympics, representing Russia.
