= Aleksandr Klimov =

Soviet speed skater

Personal information
- Nationality: Soviet
- Born: 12 August 1965 (age 59); Smolensk, Russian SFSR, Soviet Union

Sport
- Sport: Speed skating

Aleksandr Klimov (born 12 August 1965) is a Soviet speed skater. He competed in at the 1988 Winter Olympics and the 1992 Winter Olympics.
