= Vladimir Yefimov =

Russian bobsledder

Personal information
- Nationality: Russian
- Born: 1 January 1956 (age 69)

Sport
- Sport: Bobsleigh

Vladimir Yefimov (born 1 January 1956) is a Russian bobsledder. He competed at the 1992 Winter Olympics and the 1994 Winter Olympics.
