= Dionis Vodnyev =

Kazakhstani ski jumper

Personal information
- Nationality: Kazakhstani
- Born: 12 March 1971 (age 55) Almaty, Kazakhstan

Sport
- Sport: Ski jumping

Dionis Vodnyev (born 12 March 1971) is a Kazakhstani ski jumper. He competed in the normal hill and large hill events at the 1992 Winter Olympics.
