= Yury Dudarev =

Soviet ski jumper

Personal information
- Nationality: Soviet
- Born: 13 February 1970 (age 55)

Sport
- Sport: Ski jumping

Yury Dudarev (born 13 February 1970) is a Soviet ski jumper. He competed in the normal hill and large hill events at the 1992 Winter Olympics.
