= 1997–98 Nationalliga A season =

Swiss professional ice hockey season

The 1997–98 NLA season was the 60th regular season of the Nationalliga A.

== Regular season ==
=== Final standings ===
	Team	GP	W	L	T	GF	GA	Pts
1.	EV Zug	40	24	10	6	151	109	54
2.	HC Fribourg-Gottéron	40	23	12	5	142	111	51
3.	HC Davos	40	24	14	2	150	119	50
4.	HC Ambri-Piotta	40	23	15	2	156	116	48
5.	SC Bern	40	19	14	7	139	131	45
6.	HC Lugano	40	17	16	7	140	127	41
7.	Kloten Flyers	40	16	17	7	125	120	39
8.	SC Rapperswil-Jona	40	15	22	3	118	142	33
9.	HC La Chaux-de-Fonds	40	12	22	6	128	164	30
10.	ZSC Lions	40	12	23	5	109	141	29
11.	SC Herisau	40	9	29	2	94	172	20

== Playoffs ==
=== Quarterfinals ===
EV Zug (1) vs. SC Rapperswil-Jona (8)
Away	Home	
SC Rapperswil-Jona 6	4 EV Zug	
EV Zug 5	2 SC Rapperswil-Jona	
SC Rapperswil-Jona 0	3 EV Zug	
EV Zug 2	5 SC Rapperswil-Jona	
SC Rapperswil-Jona 3	6 EV Zug	
EV Zug 4	5 SC Rapperswil-Jona	OT
SC Rapperswil-Jona 2	3 EV Zug	OT
EV Zug wins series 4–3

HC Davos (3) vs. HC Lugano (6)
Away	Home	
HC Lugano 1	4 HC Davos	
HC Davos 3	9 HC Lugano	
HC Lugano 3	6 HC Davos	
HC Davos 1	4 HC Lugano	
HC Lugano 6	3 HC Davos	
HC Davos 4	3 HC Lugano	n.P.
HC Lugano 2	4 HC Davos	
HC Davos wins series 4–3

Fribourg-Gottéron (2) vs. Kloten Flyers (7)
Away	Home	
Kloten Flyers 4	0 Fribourg-Gottéron	
Fribourg-Gottéron 2	1 Kloten Flyers	
Kloten Flyers 2	3 Fribourg-Gottéron	
Fribourg-Gottéron 0	4 Kloten Flyers	
Kloten Flyers 2	1 Fribourg-Gottéron	
Fribourg-Gottéron 2	1 Kloten Flyers	OT
Kloten Flyers 0	1 Fribourg-Gottéron	
Fribourg-Gottéron wins series 4–3

HC Ambri-Piotta (4) vs. SC Bern (5)
Away	Home	
SC Bern 2	5 HC Ambri-Piotta	
HC Ambri-Piotta 4	7 SC Bern	
SC Bern 4	3 HC Ambri-Piotta	OT
HC Ambri-Piotta 3	2 SC Bern	
SC Bern 1	4 HC Ambri-Piotta	
HC Ambri-Piotta 1	2 SC Bern	
SC Bern 2	3 HC Ambri-Piotta	
HC Ambri-Piotta wins series 4–3

=== Semifinals ===
EV Zug vs. HC Ambri-Piotta
Away	Home	
HC Ambri-Piotta 2	4 EV Zug	
EV Zug 2	7 HC Ambri-Piotta	
HC Ambri-Piotta 5	3 EV Zug	
EV Zug 3	2 HC Ambri-Piotta	OT
HC Ambri-Piotta 7	1 EV Zug	
EV Zug 5	0 HC Ambri-Piotta	
HC Ambri-Piotta 2	7 EV Zug	
EV Zug wins series 4–3

Fribourg-Gottéron vs. HC Davos
Away	Home
HC Davos 5	2 Fribourg-Gottéron
Fribourg-Gottéron 2	4 HC Davos
HC Davos 2	6 Fribourg-Gottéron
Fribourg-Gottéron 4	6 HC Davos
HC Davos 5	1 Fribourg-Gottéron
HC Davos wins series 4–1

=== Finals ===
EV Zug vs. HC Davos
Away	Home	
HC Davos 1	4 EV Zug	
EV Zug 2	3 HC Davos	OT
HC Davos 4	11 EV Zug	
EV Zug 2	4 HC Davos	
HC Davos 3	4 EV Zug	
EV Zug 5	2 HC Davos	
EV Zug wins series 4–2
