= Andrey Verveykin =

Kazakhstani ski jumper

Personal information
- Nationality: Kazakhstani
- Born: 3 January 1966 (age 59)

Sport
- Sport: Ski jumping

Andrey Verveykin (born 3 January 1966) is a Kazakhstani ski jumper. He competed at the 1992 Winter Olympics and the 1994 Winter Olympics.
