= 1985–86 Soviet League season =

Sports season

The 1985–86 Soviet Championship League season was the 40th season of the Soviet Championship League, the top level of ice hockey in the Soviet Union. 12 teams participated in the league, and CSKA Moscow won the championship.

== First round ==
	Club	GP	W	T	L	GF	GA	Pts
1.	CSKA Moscow	22	18	3	1	112	44	39
2.	Dynamo Moscow	22	13	6	3	95	58	32
3.	Spartak Moscow	22	12	4	6	76	57	28
4.	Dinamo Riga	22	10	4	8	79	72	24
5.	Sokol Kiev	22	8	6	8	99	87	22
6.	SKA Leningrad	22	7	6	9	73	77	20
7.	Khimik Voskresensk	22	7	5	10	66	82	19
8.	Traktor Chelyabinsk	22	6	7	9	44	53	19
9.	Krylya Sovetov Moscow	22	7	4	11	64	74	18
10.	Torpedo Gorky	22	6	4	12	55	85	16
11.	Salavat Yulaev Ufa	22	5	4	13	56	87	14
12.	Izhstal Izhevsk	22	6	1	15	63	106	13

== Final round ==
	Club	GP	W	T	L	GF	GA	Pts
1.	CSKA Moscow	40	32	5	3	219	79	69
2.	Dynamo Moscow	40	23	9	8	156	114	55
3.	Spartak Moscow	40	20	9	11	146	119	49
4.	Sokol Kiev	40	18	9	13	172	140	45
5.	Dinamo Riga	40	19	6	15	139	129	44
6.	SKA Leningrad	40	14	10	16	146	162	38
7.	Krylya Sovetov Moscow	40	15	8	17	123	131	38
8.	Khimik Voskresensk	40	12	7	21	126	167	31
9.	Torpedo Gorky	40	8	12	20	87	121	28
10.	Traktor Chelyabinsk	40	8	4	28	98	176	20

== Relegation ==
	Team	GP	W	T	L	GF	GA	Pts
1.	Avtomobilist Sverdlovsk	28	19	3	6	143	80	41
2.	Salavat Yulaev Ufa	28	18	2	8	106	86	38
3.	Torpedo Togliatti	28	16	2	10	124	102	34
4.	SK Uritskogo Kazan	28	13	3	12	81	85	29
5.	Dinamo Kharkiv	28	11	3	14	113	120	25
6.	Izhstal Ustinov	28	10	1	17	89	104	21
7.	Kristall Saratov	28	8	2	18	81	128	18
8.	Torpedo Ust-Kamenogorsk	28	9	0	19	112	144	18
