= 1987–88 Soviet League season =

Soviet ice hockey season

The 1987–88 Soviet Championship League season was the 42nd season of the Soviet Championship League, the top level of ice hockey in the Soviet Union. Fourteen teams participated in the league, and CSKA Moscow won the championship.

== First round ==
R	Team	GP	W	T	L	GF	GA	Pts
1	(Russian Soviet Federative Socialist Republic) CSKA Moscow	26	21	2	3	149	67	44
2	(Russian Soviet Federative Socialist Republic) Krylya Sovetov Moscow	26	16	1	9	102	80	33
3	(Russian Soviet Federative Socialist Republic) Spartak Moscow	26	13	5	8	89	78	31
4	(Russian Soviet Federative Socialist Republic) Dynamo Moscow	26	13	4	9	111	91	30
5	(Russian Soviet Federative Socialist Republic) Traktor Chelyabinsk	26	11	5	10	77	67	27
6	(Russian Soviet Federative Socialist Republic) Avtomobilist Sverdlovsk	26	9	8	9	88	96	26
7	(Ukrainian Soviet Socialist Republic) Sokol Kiev	26	10	5	11	107	96	25
8	(Russian Soviet Federative Socialist Republic) Khimik Voskresensk	26	10	5	11	90	100	25
9	(Russian Soviet Federative Socialist Republic) SKA Leningrad	26	11	2	13	82	91	24
10	(Latvian Soviet Socialist Republic) Dinamo Riga	26	10	4	12	88	92	24
11	(Russian Soviet Federative Socialist Republic) Torpedo Yaroslavl	26	11	2	13	81	100	24
12	(Russian Soviet Federative Socialist Republic) Torpedo Gorky	26	9	4	13	89	109	22
13	(Russian Soviet Federative Socialist Republic) Izhstal Izhevsk	26	7	2	17	85	141	16
14	(Kazakh Soviet Socialist Republic) Torpedo Ust-Kamenogorsk	26	5	3	18	91	121	13

== Final round ==
R	Team	GP	W	T	L	GF	GA	Pts
1	(Russian Soviet Federative Socialist Republic) CSKA Moscow	18	11	5	2	81	44	27
2	(Russian Soviet Federative Socialist Republic) Dynamo Moscow	18	11	4	3	67	45	26
3	(Latvian Soviet Socialist Republic) Dinamo Riga	18	11	3	4	66	46	25
4	(Russian Soviet Federative Socialist Republic) Krylya Sovetov Moscow	18	9	5	4	63	43	23
5	(Russian Soviet Federative Socialist Republic) Spartak Moscow	18	9	3	6	63	46	21
6	(Ukrainian Soviet Socialist Republic) Sokol Kiev	18	8	2	8	77	68	18
7	(Russian Soviet Federative Socialist Republic) Traktor Chelyabinsk	18	6	4	8	49	55	16
8	(Russian Soviet Federative Socialist Republic) Khimik Voskresensk	18	5	3	10	60	72	13
9	(Russian Soviet Federative Socialist Republic) SKA Leningrad	18	2	2	14	47	88	6
10	(Russian Soviet Federative Socialist Republic) Avtomobilist Sverdlovsk	18	0	3	15	42	106	3

== Playoffs ==
Semi-finals
CSKA Moscow	2
Krylya Sovetov Moscow	1
Dynamo Moscow	1
Dinamo Riga	2

Final
CSKA Moscow	3
Dinamo Riga	1
Third place
Dynamo Moscow	2
Krylya Sovetov Moscow	0

== Relegation ==
R	Team	GP	W	T	L	GF	GA	Pts
1	(Russian Soviet Federative Socialist Republic) Torpedo Gorky	36	23	3	10	157	99	49
2	(Russian Soviet Federative Socialist Republic) Torpedo Yaroslavl	36	23	2	11	151	102	48
3	(Byelorussian Soviet Socialist Republic) Dinamo Minsk	36	22	2	12	148	116	46
4	(Ukrainian Soviet Socialist Republic) Dinamo Kharkiv	36	21	2	13	138	107	44
5	(Kazakh Soviet Socialist Republic) Torpedo Ust-Kamenogorsk	36	19	4	13	172	135	42
6	(Russian Soviet Federative Socialist Republic) Izhstal Izhevsk	36	15	3	18	131	156	33
7	(Russian Soviet Federative Socialist Republic) SK Uritskogo Kazan	36	12	7	17	102	103	31
8	(Russian Soviet Federative Socialist Republic) Sibir Novosibirsk	36	12	3	21	126	171	27
9	(Russian Soviet Federative Socialist Republic) Torpedo Togliatti	36	12	3	21	96	154	27
10	(Russian Soviet Federative Socialist Republic) Salavat Yulaev Ufa	36	6	1	29	92	171	13
