= 1986–87 Soviet League season =

Soviet ice hockey season

The 1986–87 Soviet Championship League season was the 41st season of the Soviet Championship League, the top level of ice hockey in the Soviet Union. 12 teams participated in the league, and CSKA Moscow won the championship.

== First round ==
	Club	GP	W	T	L	GF	GA	Pts
1.	CSKA Moscow	22	20	1	1	122	44	41
2.	Dynamo Moscow	22	15	2	5	104	62	32
3.	Krylya Sovetov Moscow	22	11	4	7	75	60	26
4.	SKA Leningrad	22	10	5	7	81	69	25
5.	Khimik Voskresensk	22	9	5	8	77	80	23
6.	Spartak Moscow	22	9	4	9	74	62	22
7.	Dinamo Riga	22	8	4	10	61	74	20
8.	Sokol Kiev	22	8	1	12	79	91	19
9.	Traktor Chelyabinsk	22	6	5	11	52	72	17
10.	Torpedo Gorky	22	6	4	12	66	85	16
11.	Salavat Yulaev Ufa	22	5	3	14	47	93	13
12.	Avtomobilist Sverdlovsk	22	3	4	15	57	103	10

== Final round ==
	Club	GP	W	T	L	GF	GA	Pts
1.	CSKA Moscow	40	36	2	2	223	80	74
2.	Dynamo Moscow	40	26	4	10	174	107	60
3.	SKA Leningrad	40	21	7	12	154	134	49
4.	Krylya Sovetov Moscow	40	17	8	15	126	118	42
5.	Khimik Voskresensk	40	16	9	15	142	154	41
6.	Spartak Moscow	40	16	8	16	131	120	40
7.	Dinamo Riga	40	14	5	21	117	132	33
8.	Torpedo Gorky	40	12	7	21	118	155	31
9.	Sokol Kiev	40	12	2	26	130	175	26
10.	Traktor Chelyabinsk	40	9	7	24	84	132	25

== Relegation ==
=== Promotion and relegation ===
	Club	GP	W	T	L	GF	GA	Pts
1.	Torpedo Yaroslavl	28	18	3	7	117	74	39
2.	Izhstal Izhevsk	28	18	1	9	124	115	37
3.	Avtomobilist Sverdlovsk	28	13	6	9	113	97	32
4.	Torpedo Ust-Kamenogorsk	28	12	7	9	133	133	31
5.	SK Uritskogo Kazan	28	12	4	12	106	93	28
6.	Dinamo Kharkiv	28	12	3	13	116	105	27
7.	Salavat Yulaev Ufa	28	8	4	16	92	116	20
8.	Torpedo Togliatti	28	2	6	20	84	152	10

=== Relegation games ===
- Awtomobilist Sverdlovsk − Traktor Chelyabinsk 2:2, 3:2, 4:2, 4:4
- Torpedo Ust-Kamenogorsk − Sokol Kiev 4:5, 5:11, 5:13
