= 1988–89 Soviet League season =

Soviet ice hockey season

The 1988–89 Soviet Championship League season was the 43rd season of the Soviet Championship League, the top level of ice hockey in the Soviet Union. 14 teams participated in the league, and CSKA Moscow won the championship.

== First round ==
	Team	GP	W	T	L	GF	GA	Pts
1.	CSKA Moscow	26	17	4	5	133	69	38
2.	Dynamo Moscow	26	15	4	7	100	61	34
3.	Krylya Sovetov Moscow	26	14	5	7	90	74	33
4.	Khimik Voskresensk	26	12	8	6	84	72	32
5.	Spartak Moscow	26	12	5	9	90	77	29
6.	Sokol Kiev	26	11	6	9	88	81	28
7.	Avtomobilist Sverdlovsk	26	12	3	11	86	99	27
8.	Dinamo Riga	26	11	5	10	72	71	27
9.	SKA Leningrad	26	9	6	11	67	77	24
10.	Traktor Chelyabinsk	26	10	4	12	67	74	24
11.	Torpedo Yaroslavl	26	10	3	13	81	87	23
12.	Dinamo Minsk	26	7	6	13	78	95	20
13.	Dinamo Kharkiv	26	5	4	17	69	122	14
14.	Torpedo Gorky	26	4	3	19	57	103	11

== Final round ==
	Team	GP	W	T	L	GF	GA	Pts
1.	CSKA Moscow	36	23	5	8	165	100	51
2.	Dynamo Moscow	36	19	8	9	129	103	46
3.	Krylya Sovetov Moscow	36	18	9	9	113	84	45
4.	Khimik Voskresensk	36	19	5	12	128	98	43
5.	Sokol Kiev	36	16	9	11	141	124	41
6.	Avtomobilist Sverdlovsk	36	13	3	20	93	121	29
7.	Spartak Moscow	36	9	9	18	101	119	27
8.	SKA Leningrad	36	10	7	19	94	132	27
9.	Dinamo Riga	36	10	6	20	98	156	26
10.	Traktor Chelyabinsk	36	11	3	22	91	116	25

== Relegation ==
	Team	GP	W	T	L	GF	GA	Pts
1.	Dinamo Minsk	36	25	1	10	142	106	51
2.	Torpedo Ust-Kamenogorsk	36	24	2	10	199	133	50
3.	Torpedo Yaroslavl	36	24	2	10	167	111	50
4.	Dinamo Kharkiv	36	23	2	11	144	102	48
5.	Torpedo Gorky	36	21	3	12	114	97	45
6.	SK Uritskogo Kazan	36	15	7	14	129	115	37
7.	Salavat Yulaev Ufa	36	9	3	24	115	164	21
8.	Sibir Novosibirsk	36	9	2	25	123	158	20
9.	Kristall Elektrostal	36	7	5	24	118	203	19
10.	Lada Togliatti	36	7	5	24	102	164	19
