= Ice hockey at the 1992 Winter Olympics – Rosters =

The ice hockey team rosters at the 1992 Winter Olympics consisted of the following players:

== Canada ==
Head coach: Dave King

Assistant coaches: Terry Crisp, Wayne Fleming

No.	Pos.	Name	Height	Weight	Birthdate	Team
1	G	Sean Burke	6 ft 4 in (193 cm)	209 lb (95 kg)	January 29, 1967 (aged 25)	(United States) New Jersey Devils
2	D	Dan Ratushny	6 ft 1 in (185 cm)	185 lb (84 kg)	October 29, 1970 (aged 21)	(United States) Cornell Big Red
3	D	Brian Tutt	6 ft 1 in (185 cm)	196 lb (89 kg)	June 9, 1962 (aged 29)	(Norway) Furuset
4	D	Gord Hynes	6 ft 1 in (185 cm)	170 lb (77 kg)	June 22, 1966 (aged 25)	-
5	D	Jason Woolley	6 ft 0 in (183 cm)	203 lb (92 kg)	July 27, 1969 (aged 22)	(United States) Michigan State Spartans
6	D	Kevin Dahl	5 ft 11 in (180 cm)	190 lb (86 kg)	December 30, 1968 (aged 23)	(United States) Winston-Salem Icehawks
7	D	Adrien Plavsic	6 ft 1 in (185 cm)	190 lb (86 kg)	January 13, 1970 (aged 22)	(Canada) Vancouver Canucks
8	F	Fabian Joseph	5 ft 9 in (175 cm)	165 lb (75 kg)	December 5, 1965 (aged 26)	(Switzerland) EHC Chur
9	F	Joé Juneau	6 ft 0 in (183 cm)	194 lb (88 kg)	January 5, 1968 (aged 24)	(United States) RPI Engineers
10	F	Dave Hannan	5 ft 10 in (178 cm)	181 lb (82 kg)	November 26, 1961 (aged 30)	(Canada) Toronto Maple Leafs
11	F	Chris Lindberg	6 ft 1 in (185 cm)	190 lb (86 kg)	April 16, 1967 (aged 24)	(United States) Springfield Indians
12	F	Dave Archibald	6 ft 0 in (183 cm)	203 lb (92 kg)	April 14, 1969 (aged 22)	-
15	F	Dave Tippett (A)	5 ft 10 in (178 cm)	174 lb (79 kg)	August 25, 1961 (aged 30)	(United States) Washington Capitals
16	F	Wally Schreiber	5 ft 10 in (178 cm)	176 lb (80 kg)	April 15, 1962 (aged 29)	(Germany) Schwenninger ERC
18	F	Kent Manderville	6 ft 3 in (191 cm)	207 lb (94 kg)	April 12, 1971 (aged 20)	(United States) Cornell Big Red
19	F	Todd Brost (A)	5 ft 8 in (173 cm)	179 lb (81 kg)	June 23, 1967 (aged 24)	(Germany) Schwenninger ERC
20	F	Patrick Lebeau	5 ft 10 in (178 cm)	181 lb (82 kg)	March 17, 1970 (aged 21)	(Canada) Fredericton Canadiens
22	F	Randy Smith	6 ft 4 in (193 cm)	201 lb (91 kg)	July 16, 1965 (aged 26)	-
28	D	Brad Schlegel (C)	5 ft 11 in (180 cm)	190 lb (86 kg)	July 22, 1968 (aged 23)	-
37	G	Trevor Kidd	6 ft 2 in (188 cm)	194 lb (88 kg)	March 29, 1972 (aged 19)	(United States) Spokane Chiefs
44	D	Curt Giles (A)	5 ft 9 in (175 cm)	181 lb (82 kg)	November 30, 1958 (aged 33)	-
88	F	Eric Lindros	6 ft 4 in (193 cm)	240 lb (110 kg)	February 28, 1973 (aged 18)	(Canada) Oshawa Generals

== Czechoslovakia ==
Head coach: Ivan Hlinka

Assistant coach: Jaroslav Walter

No.	Pos.	Name	Height	Weight	Birthdate	Team
1	G	Petr Bříza	6 ft 0 in (183 cm)	181 lb (82 kg)	December 9, 1964 (aged 27)	(Finland) Lukko
2	G	Oldřich Svoboda	6 ft 2 in (188 cm)	216 lb (98 kg)	January 28, 1967 (aged 25)	(Czechoslovakia) ASD Dukla Jihlava
3	D	Leo Gudas	6 ft 0 in (183 cm)	187 lb (85 kg)	May 20, 1965 (aged 26)	(Finland) JyP HT
4	D	Miloslav Hořava	5 ft 11 in (180 cm)	192 lb (87 kg)	August 14, 1961 (aged 30)	(Sweden) MoDo Hockey
5	D	Drahomír Kadlec	5 ft 11 in (180 cm)	190 lb (86 kg)	November 29, 1965 (aged 26)	(Finland) HIFK
6	D	Bedřich Ščerban	5 ft 8 in (173 cm)	176 lb (80 kg)	May 31, 1964 (aged 27)	(Finland) Tappara
7	D	Richard Šmehlík	6 ft 2 in (188 cm)	220 lb (100 kg)	January 23, 1970 (aged 22)	(Czechoslovakia) TJ Vítkovice
8	D	František Procházka (A)	6 ft 2 in (188 cm)	216 lb (98 kg)	January 25, 1962 (aged 30)	(Germany) EHC Freiburg
10	D	Róbert Švehla	6 ft 0 in (183 cm)	207 lb (94 kg)	January 2, 1969 (aged 23)	(Czechoslovakia) HK Dukla Trenčin
10	F	Petr Rosol	5 ft 10 in (178 cm)	170 lb (77 kg)	June 20, 1964 (aged 27)	(Italy) Fassa
11	F	Robert Lang	6 ft 3 in (191 cm)	212 lb (96 kg)	December 19, 1970 (aged 21)	(Czechoslovakia) HC Litvínov
12	F	Kamil Kašťák	5 ft 10 in (178 cm)	172 lb (78 kg)	May 8, 1966 (aged 25)	(Czechoslovakia) HC Litvínov
13	F	Richard Žemlička (A)	6 ft 1 in (185 cm)	201 lb (91 kg)	April 13, 1964 (aged 27)	(Czechoslovakia) HC Sparta Praha
14	F	Ladislav Lubina	6 ft 1 in (185 cm)	201 lb (91 kg)	February 11, 1967 (aged 24)	(Germany) ESV Kaufbeuren
16	F	Radek Ťoupal	5 ft 11 in (180 cm)	194 lb (88 kg)	August 16, 1966 (aged 25)	(Finland) HPK
17	F	Peter Veselovský	6 ft 1 in (185 cm)	187 lb (85 kg)	November 11, 1964 (aged 27)	(Czechoslovakia) HC Košice
18	F	Petr Hrbek	5 ft 11 in (180 cm)	194 lb (88 kg)	April 3, 1969 (aged 22)	(Czechoslovakia) HC Sparta Praha
20	F	Otakar Janecký	5 ft 10 in (178 cm)	183 lb (83 kg)	December 26, 1960 (aged 31)	(Finland) Jokerit
21	F	Patrik Augusta	5 ft 9 in (175 cm)	170 lb (77 kg)	November 13, 1969 (aged 22)	(Czechoslovakia) ASD Dukla Jihlava
24	D	Jiří Šlégr	6 ft 0 in (183 cm)	223 lb (101 kg)	May 30, 1971 (aged 20)	(Czechoslovakia) HC Litvínov
25	F	Tomáš Jelínek (C)	5 ft 10 in (178 cm)	198 lb (90 kg)	April 29, 1962 (aged 29)	(Finland) HPK
28	F	Igor Liba	6 ft 0 in (183 cm)	198 lb (90 kg)	November 4, 1960 (aged 31)	(Czechoslovakia) HC Košice
26	G	Jaromír Dragan	6 ft 0 in (183 cm)	190 lb (86 kg)	September 14, 1963 (aged 28)	(Czechoslovakia) HC Košice

== Finland ==
Head coach: Pentti Matikainen

Assistant coach: Sakari Pietilä

No.	Pos.	Name	Height	Weight	Birthdate	Team
1	G	Jukka Tammi	5 ft 11 in (180 cm)	172 lb (78 kg)	April 10, 1962 (aged 29)	(Finland) Ilves
3	D	Timo Blomqvist	5 ft 11 in (180 cm)	201 lb (91 kg)	January 23, 1961 (aged 31)	(Sweden) Malmö IF
4	D	Kari Eloranta (A)	6 ft 2 in (188 cm)	201 lb (91 kg)	February 29, 1956 (aged 35)	(Sweden) Rögle BK
5	D	Timo Jutila	5 ft 10 in (178 cm)	187 lb (85 kg)	December 24, 1963 (aged 28)	(Sweden) Luleå HF
6	D	Arto Ruotanen	5 ft 11 in (180 cm)	183 lb (83 kg)	April 11, 1961 (aged 30)	(Sweden) HV71
7	D	Simo Saarinen	5 ft 10 in (178 cm)	179 lb (81 kg)	February 14, 1963 (aged 28)	(Finland) HIFK
8	F	Teemu Selänne	6 ft 0 in (183 cm)	201 lb (91 kg)	July 3, 1970 (aged 21)	(Finland) Jokerit
9	D	Ville Sirén	6 ft 2 in (188 cm)	196 lb (89 kg)	February 11, 1964 (aged 27)	(Finland) Ilves
11	F	Jari Lindroos	5 ft 11 in (180 cm)	172 lb (78 kg)	January 31, 1961 (aged 31)	(Finland) JyP HT
12	D	Janne Laukkanen	6 ft 0 in (183 cm)	187 lb (85 kg)	March 19, 1970 (aged 21)	(Finland) HPK
14	F	Petri Skriko	5 ft 10 in (178 cm)	172 lb (78 kg)	March 13, 1962 (aged 29)	(United States) Boston Bruins
15	F	Hannu Järvenpää	6 ft 0 in (183 cm)	194 lb (88 kg)	May 19, 1963 (aged 28)	(Sweden) Leksands IF
16	F	Keijo Säilynoja	6 ft 2 in (188 cm)	196 lb (89 kg)	February 17, 1970 (aged 21)	(Finland) Jokerit
18	F	Pekka Tuomisto (C)	6 ft 0 in (183 cm)	185 lb (84 kg)	December 29, 1960 (aged 31)	(Finland) HIFK
22	F	Timo Saarikoski	6 ft 0 in (183 cm)	187 lb (85 kg)	July 17, 1969 (aged 22)	(Finland) Lukko
25	F	Raimo Summanen	5 ft 11 in (180 cm)	196 lb (89 kg)	March 2, 1962 (aged 29)	(Finland) Ilves
27	F	Timo Peltomaa	6 ft 1 in (185 cm)	209 lb (95 kg)	July 26, 1968 (aged 23)	(Finland) Ilves
28	F	Raimo Helminen	6 ft 0 in (183 cm)	194 lb (88 kg)	March 11, 1964 (aged 27)	(Sweden) Malmö IF
30	G	Markus Ketterer	5 ft 11 in (180 cm)	179 lb (81 kg)	August 23, 1967 (aged 24)	(Finland) Jokerit
40	F	Mika Nieminen	6 ft 1 in (185 cm)	203 lb (92 kg)	January 1, 1966 (aged 26)	(Finland) Lukko
42	F	Mikko Mäkelä (A)	6 ft 2 in (188 cm)	194 lb (88 kg)	February 26, 1965 (aged 26)	(Finland) TPS
44	D	Harri Laurila	6 ft 0 in (183 cm)	192 lb (87 kg)	April 30, 1965 (aged 26)	(Finland) JyP HT

== France ==
Head coach: (Sweden) Kjell Larsson

Assistant coach: Marc Peythieu

No.	Pos.	Name	Height	Weight	Birthdate	Team
1	G	Jean-Marc Djian	5 ft 8 in (173 cm)	165 lb (75 kg)	March 29, 1966 (aged 25)	(France) Bordeaux
2	F	Peter Almásy	5 ft 11 in (180 cm)	185 lb (84 kg)	February 11, 1961 (aged 30)	(France) Briançon
7	F/D	Stéphane Barin	5 ft 10 in (178 cm)	172 lb (78 kg)	January 8, 1971 (aged 21)	(France) Chamonix
8	F	Arnaud Briand	6 ft 1 in (185 cm)	198 lb (90 kg)	April 29, 1970 (aged 21)	(France) Reims
9	F	Patrick Dunn	5 ft 11 in (180 cm)	190 lb (86 kg)	March 15, 1963 (aged 28)	(France) Briançon
10	F	Pierre Pousse	5 ft 11 in (180 cm)	176 lb (80 kg)	February 27, 1966 (aged 25)	(France) Briançon
11	F	Michaël Babin	6 ft 0 in (183 cm)	176 lb (80 kg)	March 20, 1970 (aged 21)	(France) Reims
12	F	Philippe Bozon	5 ft 11 in (180 cm)	192 lb (87 kg)	November 30, 1966 (aged 25)	(France) Chamonix
14	F	Benoit Laporte	5 ft 11 in (180 cm)	176 lb (80 kg)	June 14, 1960 (aged 31)	(France) Rouen
15	F	Pascal Margerit	5 ft 9 in (175 cm)	170 lb (77 kg)	February 21, 1971 (aged 20)	(France) Briançon
16	D	Jean-Philippe Lemoine	6 ft 4 in (193 cm)	229 lb (104 kg)	September 11, 1964 (aged 27)	(France) Rouen
18	D	Serge Poudrier	5 ft 11 in (180 cm)	183 lb (83 kg)	April 22, 1966 (aged 25)	(France) Rouen
19	D	Stéphane Botteri	5 ft 9 in (175 cm)	161 lb (73 kg)	January 27, 1962 (aged 30)	(France) Rouen
20	D	Michel Leblanc	5 ft 10 in (178 cm)	176 lb (80 kg)	December 17, 1959 (aged 32)	(France) Briançon
21	F	Christophe Ville	5 ft 11 in (180 cm)	176 lb (80 kg)	June 15, 1963 (aged 28)	(France) Chamonix
22	D	Bruno Saunier	5 ft 10 in (178 cm)	176 lb (80 kg)	July 19, 1962 (aged 29)	(France) Briançon
23	D	Gérald Guennelon	6 ft 2 in (188 cm)	187 lb (85 kg)	June 22, 1967 (aged 24)	(France) Chamonix
24	D	Denis Perez	6 ft 2 in (188 cm)	203 lb (92 kg)	April 25, 1964 (aged 27)	(France) Rouen
25	F	Antoine Richer (C)	6 ft 2 in (188 cm)	196 lb (89 kg)	August 9, 1961 (aged 30)	(France) Amiens
26	D/F	Christian Pouget	5 ft 11 in (180 cm)	181 lb (82 kg)	January 11, 1966 (aged 26)	(France) Chamonix
28	F	Yves Crettenand	5 ft 9 in (175 cm)	168 lb (76 kg)	April 29, 1963 (aged 28)	(France) Grenoble
29	G	Petri Ylönen	6 ft 3 in (191 cm)	201 lb (91 kg)	October 2, 1962 (aged 29)	(France) Rouen
30	G	Fabrice Lhenry	5 ft 11 in (180 cm)	181 lb (82 kg)	June 29, 1972 (aged 19)	(France) Bordeaux

== Germany ==
Head coach: (Czechoslovakia) Luděk Bukač

Assistant coach: Franz Reindl

No.	Pos.	Name	Height	Weight	Birthdate	Team
2	D	Rick Amann	6 ft 0 in (183 cm)	190 lb (86 kg)	December 30, 1960 (aged 31)	(Germany) Düsseldorfer EG
7	F	Thomas Brandl	5 ft 9 in (175 cm)	165 lb (75 kg)	February 9, 1969 (aged 23)	(Germany) Kölner EC
29	F	Andreas Brockmann	5 ft 10 in (178 cm)	172 lb (78 kg)	June 11, 1967 (aged 24)	(Germany) Düsseldorfer EG
1	G	Helmut de Raaf	6 ft 1 in (185 cm)	176 lb (80 kg)	November 5, 1961 (aged 30)	(Germany) Düsseldorfer EG
20	F	Peter Draisaitl	6 ft 0 in (183 cm)	190 lb (86 kg)	December 7, 1965 (aged 26)	(Germany) Kölner EC
10	D	Ron Fischer	6 ft 3 in (191 cm)	207 lb (94 kg)	April 12, 1959 (aged 32)	(Germany) Sportbund DJK Rosenheim
27	G	Karl Friesen	6 ft 0 in (183 cm)	165 lb (75 kg)	June 30, 1958 (aged 33)	(Germany) Sportbund DJK Rosenheim
23	F	Dieter Hegen	6 ft 0 in (183 cm)	198 lb (90 kg)	April 29, 1962 (aged 29)	(Germany) Düsseldorfer EG
24	D	Mike Heidt	6 ft 1 in (185 cm)	190 lb (86 kg)	November 4, 1963 (aged 28)	(Germany) Sportbund DJK Rosenheim
30	G	Josef Heiß	5 ft 11 in (180 cm)	187 lb (85 kg)	June 13, 1963 (aged 28)	(Germany) Kölner EC
25	D	Uli Hiemer	6 ft 1 in (185 cm)	190 lb (86 kg)	September 21, 1962 (aged 29)	(Germany) Düsseldorfer EG
15	F	Raimund Hilger	6 ft 0 in (183 cm)	190 lb (86 kg)	December 3, 1965 (aged 26)	(Germany) Sportbund DJK Rosenheim
16	F	Georg Holzmann	5 ft 11 in (180 cm)	187 lb (85 kg)	March 5, 1961 (aged 30)	(Germany) Berliner SC Preussen
21	F	Axel Kammerer	5 ft 11 in (180 cm)	194 lb (88 kg)	July 21, 1964 (aged 27)	(Germany) Berliner SC Preussen
4	D	Udo Kießling	5 ft 11 in (180 cm)	185 lb (84 kg)	May 21, 1955 (aged 36)	(Germany) Kölner EC
9	F	Ernst Köpf	5 ft 10 in (178 cm)	181 lb (82 kg)	June 24, 1968 (aged 23)	(Germany) Kölner EC
6	D	Jörg Mayr	5 ft 10 in (178 cm)	168 lb (76 kg)	January 4, 1970 (aged 22)	(Germany) Kölner EC
19	D	Andreas Niederberger	5 ft 10 in (178 cm)	181 lb (82 kg)	April 20, 1963 (aged 28)	(Germany) Düsseldorfer EG
26	F	Jürgen Rumrich	5 ft 11 in (180 cm)	187 lb (85 kg)	March 20, 1968 (aged 23)	(Germany) Berliner SC Preussen
28	F	Michael Rumrich	5 ft 10 in (178 cm)	170 lb (77 kg)	July 1, 1965 (aged 26)	(Germany) Berliner SC Preussen
18	D	Mike Schmidt	6 ft 0 in (183 cm)	176 lb (80 kg)	May 23, 1961 (aged 30)	(Germany) Düsseldorfer EG
14	F	Bernd Truntschka	5 ft 11 in (180 cm)	176 lb (80 kg)	August 7, 1965 (aged 26)	(Germany) Düsseldorfer EG
17	F	Gerd Truntschka (C)	5 ft 9 in (175 cm)	165 lb (75 kg)	September 10, 1958 (aged 33)	(Germany) Düsseldorfer EG

== Italy ==
Head coach: (Canada) Gene Ubriaco

Assistant coaches: (Canada) Pat Cortina, (United States) Lou Vairo

No.	Pos.	Name	Height	Weight	Birthdate	Team
1	G	David Delfino	5 ft 8 in (173 cm)	174 lb (79 kg)	December 29, 1965 (aged 26)	(Italy) Fassa
3	D	Bill Stewart	6 ft 1 in (185 cm)	179 lb (81 kg)	October 6, 1957 (aged 34)	(Italy) Milano
4	D	Robert Oberrauch (C)	6 ft 2 in (188 cm)	207 lb (94 kg)	November 6, 1965 (aged 26)	(Italy) HC Bolzano
5	D	Mike DeAngelis	5 ft 11 in (180 cm)	190 lb (86 kg)	January 27, 1966 (aged 26)	(Italy) Devils Milano
6	F/D	Jim Camazzola	6 ft 0 in (183 cm)	203 lb (92 kg)	January 5, 1964 (aged 28)	(Italy) Asiago
7	D	Bob Manno	6 ft 0 in (183 cm)	185 lb (84 kg)	October 31, 1956 (aged 35)	(Italy) Milano
8	D	Georg Comploi	6 ft 2 in (188 cm)	212 lb (96 kg)	November 9, 1968 (aged 23)	(Italy) Varese
9	F	Emilio Iovio	6 ft 0 in (183 cm)	185 lb (84 kg)	March 9, 1962 (aged 29)	(Italy) Devils Milano
10	F	Joe Foglietta	5 ft 10 in (178 cm)	176 lb (80 kg)	March 8, 1966 (aged 25)	(Italy) Milano
11	F	Frank Nigro	5 ft 9 in (175 cm)	181 lb (82 kg)	February 11, 1960 (aged 31)	(Italy) HC Bolzano
13	F	Robert Ginnetti	5 ft 10 in (178 cm)	172 lb (78 kg)	July 31, 1965 (aged 26)	(Italy) Alleghe
14	F	Santino Pellegrino	5 ft 9 in (175 cm)	165 lb (75 kg)	February 9, 1965 (aged 27)	(Italy) Devils Milano
16	F	Bruno Zarrillo	5 ft 11 in (180 cm)	170 lb (77 kg)	September 5, 1966 (aged 25)	(Italy) HC Bolzano
19	F	Marco Scapinello	5 ft 7 in (170 cm)	168 lb (76 kg)	February 18, 1964 (aged 27)	(Italy) HC Bolzano
22	F	Martino Soracreppa	5 ft 9 in (175 cm)	172 lb (78 kg)	May 9, 1968 (aged 23)	(Italy) Fassa
23	D	Giovanni Marchetti	5 ft 11 in (180 cm)	183 lb (83 kg)	February 12, 1968 (aged 23)	(Italy) Fassa
24	F	Rick Morocco	5 ft 9 in (175 cm)	183 lb (83 kg)	February 14, 1963 (aged 28)	(Italy) Devils Milano
25	F	Ivano Zanatta	5 ft 11 in (180 cm)	190 lb (86 kg)	August 3, 1960 (aged 31)	(Italy) Devils Milano
26	D	Anthony Circelli	6 ft 0 in (183 cm)	183 lb (83 kg)	November 18, 1962 (aged 29)	(Italy) Devils Milano
27	F	Lucio Topatigh	6 ft 1 in (185 cm)	203 lb (92 kg)	October 19, 1965 (aged 26)	(Italy) Asiago
29	F	John Vecchiarelli	6 ft 0 in (183 cm)	194 lb (88 kg)	July 4, 1964 (aged 27)	(Italy) Milano
31	G	Mike Zanier	5 ft 11 in (180 cm)	190 lb (86 kg)	August 22, 1962 (aged 29)	(Italy) Milano

== Norway ==
Head coach: (Sweden) Bengt Ohlson

Assistant coach: Tore Jobs

No.	Pos.	Name	Height	Weight	Birthdate	Team
35	G	Steve Allman	6 ft 0 in (183 cm)	183 lb (83 kg)	May 16, 1968 (aged 23)	(Norway) Trondheim
9	D	Morgan Andersen	5 ft 10 in (178 cm)	176 lb (80 kg)	April 7, 1966 (aged 25)	(Norway) Lillehammer
19	F	Arne Billkvam	5 ft 10 in (178 cm)	201 lb (91 kg)	April 7, 1960 (aged 31)	(Norway) Vålerenga
18	F	Ole Eskild Dahlstrøm	6 ft 1 in (185 cm)	209 lb (95 kg)	March 4, 1970 (aged 21)	(Norway) Furuset
31	D	Jan-Roar Fagerli	6 ft 2 in (188 cm)	192 lb (87 kg)	September 22, 1966 (aged 25)	(Norway) Furuset
16	F	Jarle Friis	5 ft 10 in (178 cm)	168 lb (76 kg)	November 2, 1964 (aged 27)	(Norway) Vålerenga
6	D	Martin Friis	-	-	November 18, 1965 (aged 26)	(Norway) Stjernen Hockey
8	F	Rune Gulliksen	6 ft 3 in (191 cm)	181 lb (82 kg)	January 23, 1963 (aged 29)	(Norway) Storhamar
13	F	Carl Gunnar Gundersen	6 ft 1 in (185 cm)	185 lb (84 kg)	September 1, 1967 (aged 24)	(Norway) Vålerenga
10	F	Geir Hoff	6 ft 0 in (183 cm)	181 lb (82 kg)	February 14, 1965 (aged 26)	(Norway) Furuset
7	D	Tommy Jakobsen	5 ft 8 in (173 cm)	187 lb (85 kg)	December 10, 1970 (aged 21)	(Norway) Furuset
23	F	Tom Johansen	5 ft 10 in (178 cm)	181 lb (82 kg)	July 19, 1967 (aged 24)	(Norway) Vålerenga
5	D	Jon-Magne Karlstad	6 ft 2 in (188 cm)	176 lb (80 kg)	November 10, 1958 (aged 33)	(Norway) Vålerenga
20	F	Erik Kristiansen	6 ft 0 in (183 cm)	192 lb (87 kg)	March 12, 1961 (aged 30)	(Norway) Storhamar
12	F	Ørjan Løvdal	5 ft 10 in (178 cm)	172 lb (78 kg)	September 24, 1962 (aged 29)	(Norway) Stjernen Hockey
30	G	Jim Marthinsen	6 ft 2 in (188 cm)	196 lb (89 kg)	April 15, 1956 (aged 35)	(Norway) Vålerenga
29	F	Øystein Olsen	5 ft 10 in (178 cm)	207 lb (94 kg)	January 11, 1969 (aged 23)	(Norway) Vålerenga
28	F	Eirik Paulsen	6 ft 1 in (185 cm)	168 lb (76 kg)	May 21, 1970 (aged 21)	(Norway) Viking
37	F	Marius Rath	6 ft 2 in (188 cm)	187 lb (85 kg)	May 27, 1970 (aged 21)	(Norway) Vålerenga
2	D	Petter Salsten	6 ft 3 in (191 cm)	207 lb (94 kg)	March 11, 1965 (aged 26)	(Sweden) AIK
1	G	Rob Schistad	5 ft 11 in (180 cm)	187 lb (85 kg)	October 28, 1966 (aged 25)	(Norway) Viking
14	D	Kim Søgaard	5 ft 11 in (180 cm)	192 lb (87 kg)	May 16, 1964 (aged 27)	(Norway) Sparta Sarpsborg
22	F	Petter Thoresen	6 ft 0 in (183 cm)	187 lb (85 kg)	July 25, 1961 (aged 30)	(Norway) Storhamar

== Poland ==
Head coach: Leszek Lejczyk

Assistant coach: Jerzy Mruk

No.	Pos.	Name	Height	Weight	Birthdate	Team
14	F	Janusz Adamiec	5 ft 9 in (175 cm)	165 lb (75 kg)	April 29, 1962 (aged 29)	(Poland) Naprzód Janów
1	G	Marek Batkiewicz	6 ft 0 in (183 cm)	185 lb (84 kg)	August 14, 1969 (aged 22)	(Poland) Podhale Nowy Targ
8	F	Krzysztof Bujar	5 ft 7 in (170 cm)	170 lb (77 kg)	November 14, 1961 (aged 30)	(Poland) Naprzód Janów
5	D	Marek Cholewa	5 ft 9 in (175 cm)	196 lb (89 kg)	July 1, 1963 (aged 28)	(Poland) Unia Ośwęicim
21	F	Mariusz Czerkawski	6 ft 0 in (183 cm)	198 lb (90 kg)	April 13, 1972 (aged 19)	(Sweden) Djurgårdens IF
29	D	Dariusz Garbocz	6 ft 0 in (183 cm)	225 lb (102 kg)	January 11, 1971 (aged 21)	(Poland) GKS Tychy
6	D	Henryk Gruth (C)	6 ft 0 in (183 cm)	198 lb (90 kg)	September 2, 1957 (aged 34)	(Poland) GKS Tychy
12	F	Janusz Hajnos	5 ft 10 in (178 cm)	207 lb (94 kg)	August 27, 1968 (aged 23)	(Poland) Podhale Nowy Targ
20	D	Kazimierz Jurek	5 ft 9 in (175 cm)	168 lb (76 kg)	March 2, 1964 (aged 27)	(France) Bordeaux
2	D	Andrzej Kądziołka	5 ft 11 in (180 cm)	190 lb (86 kg)	October 12, 1960 (aged 31)	(Poland) Polonia Bytom
16	G	Mariusz Kieca	5 ft 11 in (180 cm)	172 lb (78 kg)	November 5, 1969 (aged 22)	(Poland) Cracovia Krakow
31	F	Waldemar Klisiak	6 ft 0 in (183 cm)	194 lb (88 kg)	May 6, 1967 (aged 24)	(Poland) Unia Ośwęicim
11	F	Krzysztof Kuźniecow	5 ft 10 in (178 cm)	181 lb (82 kg)	November 16, 1968 (aged 23)	(Poland) Polonia Bytom
17	F	Dariusz Płatek	5 ft 9 in (175 cm)	176 lb (80 kg)	July 26, 1966 (aged 25)	(Poland) Unia Ośwęicim
27	F	Mariusz Puzio	5 ft 9 in (175 cm)	159 lb (72 kg)	March 12, 1966 (aged 25)	(Poland) Polonia Bytom
25	G	Gabriel Samolej	5 ft 10 in (178 cm)	161 lb (73 kg)	June 1, 1961 (aged 30)	(Poland) Polonia Bytom
4	D	Jerzy Sobera	6 ft 1 in (185 cm)	205 lb (93 kg)	September 4, 1970 (aged 21)	(Poland) Polonia Bytom
10	D	Rafał Sroka	6 ft 2 in (188 cm)	205 lb (93 kg)	November 29, 1970 (aged 21)	(Poland) Podhale Nowy Targ
24	F	Andrzej Świstak	5 ft 8 in (173 cm)	165 lb (75 kg)	June 2, 1963 (aged 28)	(France) Bordeaux
22	D	Robert Szopiński	6 ft 1 in (185 cm)	198 lb (90 kg)	February 15, 1961 (aged 30)	(France) Bordeaux
15	F	Wojciech Tkacz	6 ft 0 in (183 cm)	194 lb (88 kg)	May 14, 1969 (aged 22)	(Sweden) Mora IK
9	F	Mirosław Tomasik	5 ft 9 in (175 cm)	176 lb (80 kg)	May 26, 1965 (aged 26)	(Poland) Podhale Nowy Targ
23	F	Sławomir Wieloch	5 ft 9 in (175 cm)	192 lb (87 kg)	January 17, 1969 (aged 23)	(Poland) Unia Ośwęicim

== Sweden ==
Head coach: Conny Evensson

Assistant coaches: Curt Lundmark

No.	Pos.	Name	Height	Weight	Birthdate	Team
35	G	Fredrik Andersson	5 ft 9 in (175 cm)	181 lb (82 kg)	February 28, 1968 (aged 23)	(Sweden) MoDo Hockey
1	G	Roger Nordström	5 ft 9 in (175 cm)	176 lb (80 kg)	April 27, 1966 (aged 25)	(Sweden) Malmö IF
2	D	Petri Liimatainen	5 ft 11 in (180 cm)	196 lb (89 kg)	July 20, 1969 (aged 22)	(Sweden) AIK
5	D	Fredrik Stillman	5 ft 8 in (173 cm)	170 lb (77 kg)	August 22, 1966 (aged 25)	(Sweden) HV71
7	D	Tommy Sjödin	6 ft 0 in (183 cm)	198 lb (90 kg)	August 13, 1965 (aged 26)	(Sweden) Brynäs IF
8	D	Kenneth Kennholt	6 ft 3 in (191 cm)	201 lb (91 kg)	January 13, 1965 (aged 27)	(Sweden) Djurgårdens IF
9	F	Thomas Rundqvist (C)	6 ft 3 in (191 cm)	196 lb (89 kg)	May 4, 1960 (aged 31)	(Sweden) Färjestad BK
12	F	Håkan Loob	5 ft 9 in (175 cm)	176 lb (80 kg)	July 3, 1960 (aged 31)	(Sweden) Färjestad BK
14	F	Peter Ottosson	5 ft 10 in (178 cm)	170 lb (77 kg)	September 4, 1965 (aged 26)	(Sweden) Färjestad BK
15	F	Patrik Carnbäck	6 ft 0 in (183 cm)	192 lb (87 kg)	February 1, 1968 (aged 24)	(Sweden) Västra Frölunda HC
16	F	Bengt-Åke Gustafsson	6 ft 0 in (183 cm)	198 lb (90 kg)	March 23, 1958 (aged 33)	(Sweden) Färjestad BK
17	F	Daniel Rydmark	5 ft 10 in (178 cm)	187 lb (85 kg)	February 23, 1970 (aged 21)	(Sweden) Malmö IF
19	D	Peter Andersson (A)	6 ft 0 in (183 cm)	181 lb (82 kg)	March 2, 1962 (aged 29)	(Sweden) IF Björklöven
20	F	Patrik Erickson	5 ft 11 in (180 cm)	190 lb (86 kg)	March 13, 1969 (aged 22)	(Sweden) AIK
21	D	Börje Salming (A)	6 ft 1 in (185 cm)	209 lb (95 kg)	April 17, 1951 (aged 40)	(Sweden) AIK
22	F	Charles Berglund	5 ft 9 in (175 cm)	176 lb (80 kg)	January 18, 1965 (aged 27)	(Sweden) Djurgårdens IF
23	F	Jan Viktorsson	5 ft 8 in (173 cm)	165 lb (75 kg)	July 27, 1964 (aged 27)	(Sweden) Djurgårdens IF
24	F	Lars Edström	5 ft 11 in (180 cm)	198 lb (90 kg)	July 16, 1966 (aged 25)	(Sweden) Luleå HF
25	F	Mikael Johansson	5 ft 10 in (178 cm)	192 lb (87 kg)	June 12, 1966 (aged 25)	(Sweden) Djurgårdens IF
26	F	Mats Näslund	5 ft 7 in (170 cm)	161 lb (73 kg)	October 31, 1959 (aged 32)	(Sweden) Malmö IF
27	F	Patric Kjellberg	6 ft 2 in (188 cm)	212 lb (96 kg)	June 17, 1969 (aged 22)	(Sweden) AIK
30	G	Tommy Söderström	5 ft 9 in (175 cm)	165 lb (75 kg)	July 17, 1969 (aged 22)	(Sweden) Djurgårdens IF
55	D	Peter Andersson	6 ft 0 in (183 cm)	198 lb (90 kg)	August 29, 1965 (aged 26)	(Sweden) Malmö IF

== Switzerland ==
Head coach: (Finland) Juhani Tamminen

Assistant coach: (Canada) Bryan Lefley

No.	Pos.	Name	Height	Weight	Birthdate	Team
3	D	André Künzi	6 ft 0 in (183 cm)	187 lb (85 kg)	January 10, 1967 (aged 25)	(Switzerland) EV Zug
6	D	Dino Kessler	6 ft 0 in (183 cm)	198 lb (90 kg)	December 23, 1966 (aged 25)	(Switzerland) EV Zug
7	D	Sandro Bertaggia	5 ft 9 in (175 cm)	187 lb (85 kg)	May 7, 1964 (aged 27)	(Switzerland) HC Lugano
10	F	Patrick Howald	6 ft 0 in (183 cm)	198 lb (90 kg)	December 26, 1969 (aged 22)	(Switzerland) SC Bern
13	F	Thomas Vrabec	6 ft 0 in (183 cm)	212 lb (96 kg)	October 22, 1966 (aged 25)	(Switzerland) SC Bern
14	F	Mario Brodmann	5 ft 9 in (175 cm)	176 lb (80 kg)	April 24, 1966 (aged 25)	(Switzerland) HC Fribourg-Gottéron
15	F	Mario Rottaris	6 ft 2 in (188 cm)	190 lb (86 kg)	February 8, 1968 (aged 24)	(Switzerland) HC Fribourg-Gottéron
16	D	Sven Leuenberger	6 ft 0 in (183 cm)	183 lb (83 kg)	August 25, 1969 (aged 22)	(Switzerland) SC Bern
17	D	Andreas Beutler	6 ft 3 in (191 cm)	205 lb (93 kg)	January 26, 1963 (aged 29)	(Switzerland) SC Bern
18	F	Andreas Ton	5 ft 10 in (178 cm)	176 lb (80 kg)	September 21, 1962 (aged 29)	(Switzerland) HC Lugano
19	F	Peter Jaks	6 ft 0 in (183 cm)	231 lb (105 kg)	May 4, 1966 (aged 25)	(Switzerland) HC Ambrì-Piotta
20	G	Renato Tosio	5 ft 11 in (180 cm)	176 lb (80 kg)	November 16, 1964 (aged 27)	(Switzerland) SC Bern
21	F	Keith Fair	5 ft 11 in (180 cm)	187 lb (85 kg)	January 8, 1968 (aged 24)	(Switzerland) HC Ambrì-Piotta
22	F	Fredy Lüthi	6 ft 0 in (183 cm)	176 lb (80 kg)	July 31, 1961 (aged 30)	(Switzerland) HC Lugano
23	F	Gil Montandon	6 ft 1 in (185 cm)	205 lb (93 kg)	April 28, 1965 (aged 26)	(Switzerland) SC Bern
24	F	Jörg Eberle (C)	6 ft 0 in (183 cm)	198 lb (90 kg)	February 9, 1962 (aged 30)	(Switzerland) HC Lugano
27	F	André Rötheli	6 ft 1 in (185 cm)	203 lb (92 kg)	October 12, 1970 (aged 21)	(Switzerland) HC Lugano
28	G	Reto Pavoni	5 ft 10 in (178 cm)	168 lb (76 kg)	January 24, 1968 (aged 24)	(Switzerland) EHC Kloten
29	F	Manuele Celio	5 ft 10 in (178 cm)	181 lb (82 kg)	June 9, 1966 (aged 25)	(Switzerland) EHC Kloten
30	D	Patrice Brasey	6 ft 2 in (188 cm)	190 lb (86 kg)	January 28, 1964 (aged 28)	(Switzerland) HC Fribourg-Gottéron
31	D	Samuel Balmer	5 ft 9 in (175 cm)	179 lb (81 kg)	May 1, 1968 (aged 23)	(Switzerland) HC Fribourg-Gottéron
34	D	Doug Honegger	6 ft 0 in (183 cm)	190 lb (86 kg)	February 24, 1968 (aged 23)	(Switzerland) HC Lugano

== Unified Team ==
Head coach: (Russia) Viktor Tikhonov

Assistant coach: (Russia) Igor Dmitriev

No.	Pos.	Name	Height	Weight	Birthdate	Team
1	G	(Russia) Andrei Trefilov	6 ft 0 in (183 cm)	181 lb (82 kg)	August 31, 1969 (aged 22)	(Russia) Dynamo Moskva
2	D	(Russia) Dmitri Yushkevich	5 ft 11 in (180 cm)	207 lb (94 kg)	November 19, 1971 (aged 20)	(Russia) Dynamo Moskva
3	D	(Russia) Igor Kravchuk	6 ft 1 in (185 cm)	205 lb (93 kg)	September 13, 1966 (aged 25)	(Russia) CSKA Moskva
4	D	(Russia) Vladimir Malakhov	6 ft 4 in (193 cm)	229 lb (104 kg)	August 30, 1968 (aged 23)	(Russia) CSKA Moskva
5	D	(Russia) Dmitri Mironov	6 ft 3 in (191 cm)	214 lb (97 kg)	December 5, 1965 (aged 26)	(Russia) Krylya Sovetov Moskva
6	D	(Lithuania) Darius Kasparaitis	5 ft 10 in (178 cm)	207 lb (94 kg)	October 16, 1972 (aged 19)	(Russia) Dynamo Moskva
7	D	(Russia) Sergei Bautin	6 ft 5 in (196 cm)	231 lb (105 kg)	March 11, 1967 (aged 24)	(Russia) Dynamo Moskva
8	F	(Russia) Igor Boldin	5 ft 11 in (180 cm)	187 lb (85 kg)	February 2, 1964 (aged 28)	(Russia) Spartak Moskva
10	F	(Russia) Sergei Petrenko	6 ft 0 in (183 cm)	190 lb (86 kg)	September 10, 1968 (aged 23)	(Russia) Dynamo Moskva
11	F	(Russia) Evgeny Davydov	6 ft 0 in (183 cm)	198 lb (90 kg)	May 27, 1967 (aged 24)	(Russia) CSKA Moskva
12	F	(Russia) Nikolai Borschevsky	5 ft 9 in (175 cm)	179 lb (81 kg)	January 12, 1965 (aged 27)	(Russia) Spartak Moskva
13	F	(Russia) Yuri Khmylev	6 ft 1 in (185 cm)	190 lb (86 kg)	August 9, 1964 (aged 27)	(Russia) Krylya Sovetov Moskva
14	F	(Russia) Alexei Kovalev	6 ft 2 in (188 cm)	223 lb (101 kg)	February 24, 1973 (aged 18)	(Russia) Dynamo Moskva
15	F	(Russia) Andrei Khomutov	5 ft 10 in (178 cm)	181 lb (82 kg)	April 21, 1961 (aged 30)	(Switzerland) HC Fribourg-Gottéron
16	D	(Russia) Sergei Zubov	6 ft 1 in (185 cm)	201 lb (91 kg)	July 22, 1970 (aged 21)	(Russia) CSKA Moskva
20	G	(Russia) Mikhail Shtalenkov	6 ft 1 in (185 cm)	183 lb (83 kg)	October 20, 1965 (aged 26)	(Russia) Dynamo Moskva
22	F	(Russia) Andrei Kovalenko	6 ft 0 in (183 cm)	227 lb (103 kg)	June 7, 1970 (aged 21)	(Russia) CSKA Moskva
23	D	(Ukraine) Alexei Zhitnik	5 ft 10 in (178 cm)	203 lb (92 kg)	October 10, 1972 (aged 19)	(Russia) CSKA Moskva
24	F	(Russia) Vitali Prokhorov	5 ft 10 in (178 cm)	165 lb (75 kg)	December 25, 1966 (aged 25)	(Russia) Spartak Moskva
26	F	(Russia) Alexei Zhamnov	6 ft 0 in (183 cm)	194 lb (88 kg)	October 1, 1970 (aged 21)	(Russia) Dynamo Moskva
27	F	(Russia) Vyacheslav Bykov (C)	5 ft 8 in (173 cm)	203 lb (92 kg)	July 24, 1960 (aged 31)	(Switzerland) HC Fribourg-Gottéron
29	F	(Russia) Vyacheslav Butsayev	6 ft 2 in (188 cm)	218 lb (99 kg)	June 13, 1970 (aged 21)	(Russia) CSKA Moskva
30	G	(Russia) Nikolai Khabibulin	6 ft 1 in (185 cm)	207 lb (94 kg)	January 13, 1973 (aged 19)	(Russia) CSKA Moskva

== United States ==
Head coach: Dave Peterson

Assistant coach: Keith Allain

No.	Pos.	Name	Height	Weight	Birthdate	Team
1	G	Ray LeBlanc	5 ft 10 in (178 cm)	172 lb (78 kg)	October 24, 1964 (aged 27)	(United States) Indianapolis Ice
2	D	Greg Brown	6 ft 0 in (183 cm)	203 lb (92 kg)	March 7, 1968 (aged 23)	(United States) Rochester Americans
3	D	Dave Tretowicz	5 ft 11 in (180 cm)	196 lb (89 kg)	March 15, 1969 (aged 22)	(United States) Phoenix Roadrunners
4	D	Scott Lachance	6 ft 1 in (185 cm)	212 lb (96 kg)	October 22, 1972 (aged 19)	(United States) Boston University Terriers
5	D	Guy Gosselin (A)	5 ft 11 in (180 cm)	192 lb (87 kg)	January 6, 1964 (aged 28)	-
6	F	Ted Donato	5 ft 10 in (178 cm)	179 lb (81 kg)	April 28, 1969 (aged 22)	(United States) Harvard Crimson
10	F	David Emma	5 ft 11 in (180 cm)	190 lb (86 kg)	January 14, 1969 (aged 23)	(United States) Boston College Eagles
11	F	Steve Heinze	6 ft 0 in (183 cm)	194 lb (88 kg)	January 30, 1970 (aged 22)	(United States) Boston College Eagles
14	F	Joe Sacco	6 ft 1 in (185 cm)	194 lb (88 kg)	February 4, 1969 (aged 23)	(Canada) Toronto Maple Leafs
15	F	Shawn McEachern	5 ft 11 in (180 cm)	201 lb (91 kg)	February 28, 1969 (aged 22)	(United States) Boston University Terriers
17	F	Keith Tkachuk	6 ft 2 in (188 cm)	231 lb (105 kg)	March 28, 1972 (aged 19)	(United States) Boston University Terriers
18	F	Ted Drury	6 ft 0 in (183 cm)	190 lb (86 kg)	September 13, 1971 (aged 20)	(United States) Harvard Crimson
19	F	Scott Young	6 ft 1 in (185 cm)	201 lb (91 kg)	October 1, 1967 (aged 24)	(Italy) HC Bolzano
20	F	Jim Johannson	6 ft 2 in (188 cm)	201 lb (91 kg)	March 10, 1964 (aged 27)	(United States) Indianapolis Ice
21	F	Tim Sweeney	5 ft 11 in (180 cm)	185 lb (84 kg)	April 12, 1967 (aged 24)	(Canada) Calgary Flames
22	D	Moe Mantha (A)	6 ft 2 in (188 cm)	194 lb (88 kg)	January 21, 1961 (aged 31)	(Canada) Winnipeg Jets
24	D	Bret Hedican	6 ft 2 in (188 cm)	212 lb (96 kg)	August 10, 1970 (aged 21)	(United States) St. Cloud State Huskies
25	D	Sean Hill	6 ft 0 in (183 cm)	198 lb (90 kg)	February 14, 1970 (aged 21)	(Canada) Fredericton Canadiens
27	F	C.J. Young	5 ft 10 in (178 cm)	181 lb (82 kg)	January 1, 1968 (aged 24)	(United States) Salt Lake Golden Eagles
28	F	Marty McInnis	5 ft 11 in (180 cm)	183 lb (83 kg)	June 2, 1970 (aged 21)	(United States) Boston College Eagles
30	G	Scott Gordon	5 ft 10 in (178 cm)	174 lb (79 kg)	February 6, 1963 (aged 29)	(Canada) Halifax Citadels
44	F	Clark Donatelli	5 ft 10 in (178 cm)	183 lb (83 kg)	November 22, 1965 (aged 26)	-

== Sources ==
- Duplacey, James (1998). Total Hockey: The official encyclopedia of the National Hockey League. Total Sports. ISBN 0-8362-7114-9.
- Podnieks, Andrew (2010). IIHF Media Guide & Record Book 2011. Moydart Pres.
- Hockey Hall Of Fame page on the 1992 Olympics
