= Vålerenga Ishockey =

- City: Oslo, Norway
- League: EliteHockey Ligaen
- Founded: 1947; 79 years ago
- Home arena: Jordal Amfi
- Colors: Dark blue, red and white
- General manager: Anders Myrvold
- Head coach: Fredrik Andersson
- Captain: Martin Røymark
- Affiliates: Hasle Løren (1. div)
- Website: vif-hockey.no

Championships
- Regular season titles: 30
- Playoff championships: 1960, 1962, 1963, 1965, 1966, 1967, 1968, 1969, 1970, 1971, 1973, 1982, 1985, 1987, 1988, 1991, 1992, 1993, 1998, 1999, 2001, 2003, 2005, 2006, 2007, 2009

Vålerenga Ishockey (Norwegian pronunciation: [ˈvôːɽɛŋɑ]; abbreviated as VIF) is a Norwegian professional ice hockey team based in Oslo, Norway. Vålerenga has been the dominant force in Norwegian hockey since the 1960s, claiming 26 national championships and 29 regular season titles. Their old home arena, located in central-eastern Oslo, was Jordal Amfi, built for the 1952 Winter Olympics. In 2020, Vålerenga moved in to their new arena at Jordal.

The team's interim head coach is former NHL player and club legend, Espen "Shampo" Knutsen, with Joachim Svendsen as his assistant.

== History ==
=== Early days ===
Although the parent club Vålerengens Idrettsforening was founded in 1913, the history of Vålerenga Ishockey starts in 1947, when the junior team participated in the national junior championships for the first time. In the 50s, the junior team won the national junior championships five years in a row.

=== First dynasty (1960–1973) ===
Vålerenga won their first national championship in 1960, taking over the throne from local rivals Gamlebyen. More championships were won in 1962 and 1963. From 1965 to 1971, Vålerenga won the championship seven times in a row, a feat not repeated in Norwegian hockey since. Notable players from this era include Arne "Mikkel" Mikkelsen, Steinar "Bjølle" Bjølbakk, Tor "Jern-Gustav" Gundersen, and notably, Roy "Sleipern" Jansen. Another title was added in 1973, but this also marked the end of the first dynasty as the club faced a generational change.

=== A new generation (1982–1994) ===
Ten years went by before Vålerenga could celebrate another championship, in 1983. A new generation had emerged, and players such as Jim Marthinsen, Roy Johansen, Geir Myhre, Tor Helge "Totto" Eikeland, Bjørn Kolsrud, Arne Billkvam and Jon Magne Karlstad would go on to become club legends. In 1988, Vålerenga won their 15th title. The next season saw the debut of Espen Knutsen, who would later become the first Vålerenga product to play in the National Hockey League.

=== Recent era ===
This marked the start of another dynasty for Vålerenga and the club added several more titles in the 1990s. Kent Forsberg became head coach in 1994 and invited his son Peter and Markus Näslund to play a friendly match for the club during the lockout season in the NHL. The 20th national championship was won in 1999. Notable players from this era include Morten Ask, Kenneth Larsen, and Kjell Richard "Ricky" Nygaard, along with Swedish imports such as Johan Brummer, Patric Englund and Niklas Gällstedt. Six more championships were added after 2000, the last being won in 2009. Vålerenga were in talks to join the Kontinental Hockey League in 2014, but the plans didn't go through.

Vålerenga's home arena through six decades, Jordal Amfi, was demolished in January 2017 and replaced by new arena, completed in the fall of 2020 after construction delays.

== Season-by-season results ==
This is a partial list of the last ten seasons completed by Vålerenga. For the full season-by-season history, see List of Vålerenga Ishockey seasons.

Norwegian Champions	Regular Season Champions	Promoted	Relegated

Season	League	Regular season									Postseason
Season	League	GP	W	L	OTW	OTL	GF	GA	Pts	Finish	Postseason
2013–14	Eliteserien	45	32	8	2	3	195	95	103	1st	Lost in Finals, 2–4 (Stavanger)
2014–15	Eliteserien	45	24	15	2	4	182	129	74	5th	Lost in Semi-finals, 0–4 (Stavanger)
2015–16	Eliteserien	45	21	16	6	2	122	98	77	5th	Lost in Semi-finals, 1–4 (Lørenskog)
2016–17	Eliteserien	45	20	16	4	5	135	111	73	5th	Lost in Quarter-finals, 2–4 (Frisk Asker)
2017–18	Eliteserien	45	18	17	5	5	144	132	69	5th	Lost in Quarter-finals, 1–4 (Lillehammer)
2018–19	Eliteserien	48	32	7	3	6	196	102	108	1st	Lost in Semi-finals, 2–4 (Frisk Asker)
2019–20	Eliteserien	45	22	16	4	3	125	107	77	3rd	Cancelled due to the COVID-19 pandemic
2020–21	Eliteserien	25	16	7	0	2	84	67	50	4th	Cancelled due to the COVID-19 pandemic
2021–22	Eliteserien	42	20	10	6	6	147	102	78	4th	Lost in Quarter-finals, 2–4 (Storhamar)
2022–23	Eliteserien	45	25	8	7	5	162	100	94	3rd	Lost in Semi-finals, 2–4 (Storhamar)
2023–24	EliteHockey Ligaen	45	31	10	2	2	190	121	99	3rd	Lost in Finals, 1–4 (Storhamar)
2024–25	EliteHockey Ligaen										

== Head coaches ==
- Jan Molberg, ?-1953
- Georg Hebæk, 1953-?
- Tor Gundersen, 195?-197?
- Lennart Johansson, 1983-1984
- Lennart Åhlberg, 1984-1987
- Erik Ask, 1987-1990
- Geir Myhre, 1990-1993
- Kent Forsberg, 1994-1995
- Staffan Tholson, 1995-1997
- Roy Johansen, 1997-2001
- Petter Thoresen, 2001-2004
- Knut Jørgen Stubdal, 2004-2006
- Espen Knutsen, 2006-2016
- Roy Johansen, 2016-

== Honours ==
- Norwegian Champions (26): 1960, 1962–3, 1965–71, 1973, 1982, 1985, 1987–8, 1991–3, 1998–9, 2001, 2003, 2005–7, 2009
- Regular Seasons (30): 1961–62, 1962–63, 1963–64, 1964–65, 1965–66, 1966–67, 1967–68, 1968–69, 1969–70, 1970–71, 1979–80, 1981–82, 1984–85, 1987–88, 1990–91, 1991–92, 1992–93, 1993–94, 1995–96, 1997–98, 1998–1999, 1999–00, 2001–02, 2002–03, 2004–05, 2006–07, 2009–10, 2012–13, 2013–14, 2018–19

== Individual all-time records ==
Statistics for regular season only.

- – current active player

=== Scoring leaders ===
Points
Player	Seasons	Pos	GP	G	A	Pts	PPG
Arne Billkvam	1977–1996	RW	531	268	223	491	0.92
Tobias Lindström	2013-	C	419	228	239	467	1.11
Roy Johansen	1976-1994	C	416	228	212	440	1.05
Marius Rath	1986-2003	LW	465	181	256	437	0.93
Øystein Olsen	1990-2008	C	500	224	211	435	0.87
Lars Erik Lund	1996–2011	D	506	130	269	399	0.78
Kenneth Larsen	1996-2009; 2012	LW	492	149	229	378	0.76
Vegar Barlie	1990-2007	C	491	159	216	375	0.95
Morten Ask	1998–2003, 2005; 2010-11, 2012-2019	C	391	109	251	360	0.92
Petter Thoresen	1986–1992	RW	221	184	183	367	1.66
Bjørn Kolsrud		D	279	173	170	343	1.22

=== Most league matches ===
Matches
Player	Career	Matches
Brede Frettem Csiszar	2006-2019	503
Jon Magne Karlstad	1977–1994	548
Arne Billkvam	1977–1996	531
Jim Marthinsen	1975–1994	509
Lars Erik Lund	1996–2011	506
Øystein Olsen	1990–2008	500
Kenneth Larsen	1996-2009; 2012	492
Roy Jansen	1966–1984	484
Jonas Oppøyen	2007–2022	466
Marius Rath	1986–2003	465
Kjell Rickard Nygård	1996-2010	457

Last updated: 25 March 2023

=== Notable players ===
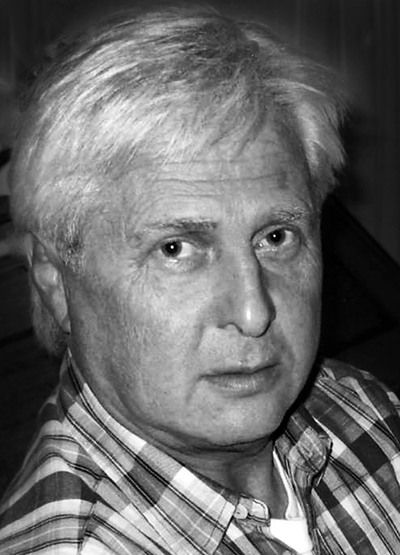
Roy "Sleipern" Jansen played 484 regular season games for Vålerenga between 1966 and 1984.

- (Norway) Alexander Bonsaksen
- (Norway) Anders Fredriksen
- (Norway) Anders Myrvold
- (Norway) Arne Billkvam
- (Norway) Atle Olsen
- (Sweden) Björn Bjurling
- (Canada) Blake Evans
- (Norway) Brede Frettem Csiszar
- (Canada) Brendan Brooks
- (Italy) Brian Ihnacak
- (Norway) Bård Sørlie
- (Canada) Chris Mason
- (Canada) Christian Chartier
- (Norway) Daniel Sørvik
- (Norway) Einar Bruno Larsen
- (Norway) Erik Follestad Johansen
- (Norway) Espen "Shampo" Knutsen
- (Canada) Evan Cheverie
- (Norway) Frank Vestreng
- (Canada) Gavin Morgan
- (Norway) Geir Hoff
- (Norway) Geir Myhre
- (Canada) Greg Day
- (Finland) Ilkka Kaarna
- (Norway) Jan-Roar Fagerli
- (Norway) Jim Marthinsen
- (Czech Republic) Jiri Latal
- (Sweden) Johan Åkerman
- (Sweden) Johan Brummer
- (Norway) Jon-Magne Karlstad
- (Canada) Justin Donati
- (Norway) Jørgen Karterud
- (Norway) Ken Andre Olimb
- (Sweden) Kent Nilsson
- (Norway) Lars Erik Lund
- (Norway) Lars Haugen
- (Norway) Marius Rath
- (United States) Mark McCutcheon
- (Norway) Martin Laumann Ylven
- (Norway) Mathis Olimb
- (Norway) Mathias Trygg
- (Norway) Mats Rosseli Olsen
- (Norway) Mats Trygg
- (Norway) Mats Zuccarello
- (Norway) Morten Ask
- (Norway) Sigurd Thinn
- (Norway) Tommy Marthinsen
- (Canada) Travis Brigley
- (Sweden) Per-Ragnar Bergkvist
- (Norway) Petter Thoresen
- (Sweden) Patric Englund
- (Canada) Patrick Coulombe
- (Canada) Patrick DesRochers
- (Canada) Regan Kelly
- (Norway) Roy Jansen
- (Norway) Roy Johansen
- (Canada) Scott Hartnell
- (Canada) Serge Boisvert
- (Russia) Sergei Pushkov
- (Canada) Simon Gamache
- (Norway) Sondre Olden
- (Norway) Stig Johansen
- (Finland) Tommy Kiviaho
- (Canada) Tyler Donati
- (Norway) Vegar Barlie
- (Czech Republic) Vladimir Machulda
- (Norway) Øystein Olsen
