= Csiszár =

‡Csiszár or Csiszar ([ˈtʃisaːr], from an old, now defunct Hungarian word for swordsmith; cf. the Hungarian verb csiszál / csiszol "to sand, rub, polish") is a Hungarian surname. It may refer to:

- Brede Frettem Csiszar (born 1987), Norwegian professional ice hockey defenceman
- Henrietta Csiszár (born 1994), Hungarian football midfielder
- Imre Csiszár (born 1938), Hungarian mathematician
