= Greg Day =

Canadian professional ice hockey forward

- Born: February 25, 1977 (age 48) St Clair Beach, Ontario, Canada
- Height: 5 ft 10 in (178 cm)
- Weight: 175 lb (79 kg; 12 st 7 lb)
- Position: Forward
- Shot: Left
- Played for: Worcester IceCats; Lowell Lock Monsters; Scorpions de Mulhouse; Vålerenga; HC Milano; Graz99ers; HC Thurgau; KHL Medveščak
- NHL draft: Undrafted
- Playing career: 2002–2012

Greg Day (born February 25, 1977) is a Canadian former professional ice hockey forward.

== Playing career ==
Day was born in St Clair Beach, Ontario. He spent four seasons playing for Bowling Green State University before turning professional in 2002. He spent the next two seasons playing in the ECHL for the Peoria Rivermen and the Las Vegas Wranglers and in the American Hockey League for the Worcester IceCats and the Lowell Lock Monsters. In 2004, Day moved to the European leagues and spent one season in the French Ligue Magnus for HC Mulhouse and then spent one season playing in Norway's GET-ligaen for Vålerenga Ishockey before joining Graz 99ers of the EBEL in 2006. Day had a short spell in Italy's Serie A for Milano Vipers during the 2007–08 season but eventually returned to Graz.

Day joined HC Thurgau of the Swiss National League B for the 2010–11 campaign. After posting 30 points in 25 games, Day then joined Croatian team KHL Medveščak on loan for the remainder of the season on December 18, 2010.

== Career statistics ==
			Regular season					Playoffs
Season	Team	League	GP	G	A	Pts	PIM	GP	G	A	Pts	PIM
1998–99	Bowling Green State U.	CCHA	38	10	11	21	8	—	—	—	—	—
1999–00	Bowling Green State U.	CCHA	37	13	16	29	20	—	—	—	—	—
2000–01	Bowling Green State U.	CCHA	40	20	27	47	26	—	—	—	—	—
2001–02	Bowling Green State U.	CCHA	39	17	20	37	22	—	—	—	—	—
2002–03	Worcester IceCats	AHL	25	6	7	13	18	2	0	0	0	0
2002–03	Peoria Rivermen	ECHL	31	12	15	27	10	—	—	—	—	—
2003–04	Las Vegas Wranglers	ECHL	67	20	44	64	36	5	1	4	5	2
2003–04	Lowell Lock Monsters	AHL	8	0	1	1	2	—	—	—	—	—
2004–05	HC Mulhouse	FRA	28	20	20	40	43	10	5	9	14	6
2005–06	Vålerenga	NOR	40	19	23	42	32	14	10	11	21	6
2006–07	Graz 99ers	EBEL	47	31	32	63	40	—	—	—	—	—
2007–08	Graz 99ers	EBEL	39	15	30	45	20	—	—	—	—	—
2007–08	HC Milano	ITL	7	2	12	14	2	9	5	3	8	6
2008–09	Graz 99ers	EBEL	43	11	24	35	20	6	2	0	2	4
2009–10	Graz 99ers	EBEL	54	19	45	64	16	6	1	4	5	8
2010–11	HC Thurgau	NLB	25	13	17	30	14	—	—	—	—	—
2010–11	KHL Medveščak Zagreb	EBEL	27	6	10	16	24	5	4	3	7	4
2011–12	KHL Medveščak Zagreb	EBEL	43	10	31	41	20	9	3	2	5	6
2012–13	Graz 99ers	EBEL	52	16	29	45	26	5	1	4	5	4
2013–14	Graz 99ers	EBEL	54	10	20	30	28	—	—	—	—	—
EBEL totals			359	118	221	339	194	31	11	13	24	26
