= Viktor Lindgren =

Swedish ice hockey player

- Born: March 16, 1986 (age 39); Luleå, Sweden
- Height: 5 ft 9 in (175 cm)
- Weight: 177 lb (80 kg; 12 st 9 lb)
- Position: Right Wing
- Shoots: Right
- EBHL team: EC Red Bull Salzburg
- Playing career: 2006–present

Viktor Lindgren (born March 16, 1986, in Luleå, Sweden) is a professional Swedish ice hockey player. He is currently playing for Graz 99ers and formerly for EC Red Bull Salzburg, Luleå HF in Elitserien.
