= Vegar Barlie =

Norwegian ice hockey player

- Born: August 7, 1972 (age 53) Asker, Norway
- Height: 6 ft 0 in (183 cm)
- Weight: 174 lb (79 kg; 12 st 6 lb)
- Position: Forward
- Shot: Left
- Played for: Vålerenga; Lillehammer; Frisk Asker; Bergen
- National team: Norway
- NHL draft: 210th overall, 1991; Edmonton Oilers
- Playing career: 1990–2007

Vegar Barlie (born August 7, 1972) is a Norwegian ice hockey player. Barlie competed with the Norway men's national ice hockey team in the 1994 Men's World Ice Hockey Championships and in the 1994 Winter Olympics.

He was selected by the Edmonton Oilers in the 10th round (210th overall) of the 1991 NHL entry draft.
