= Mark McCutcheon =

American ice hockey player (born 1984)

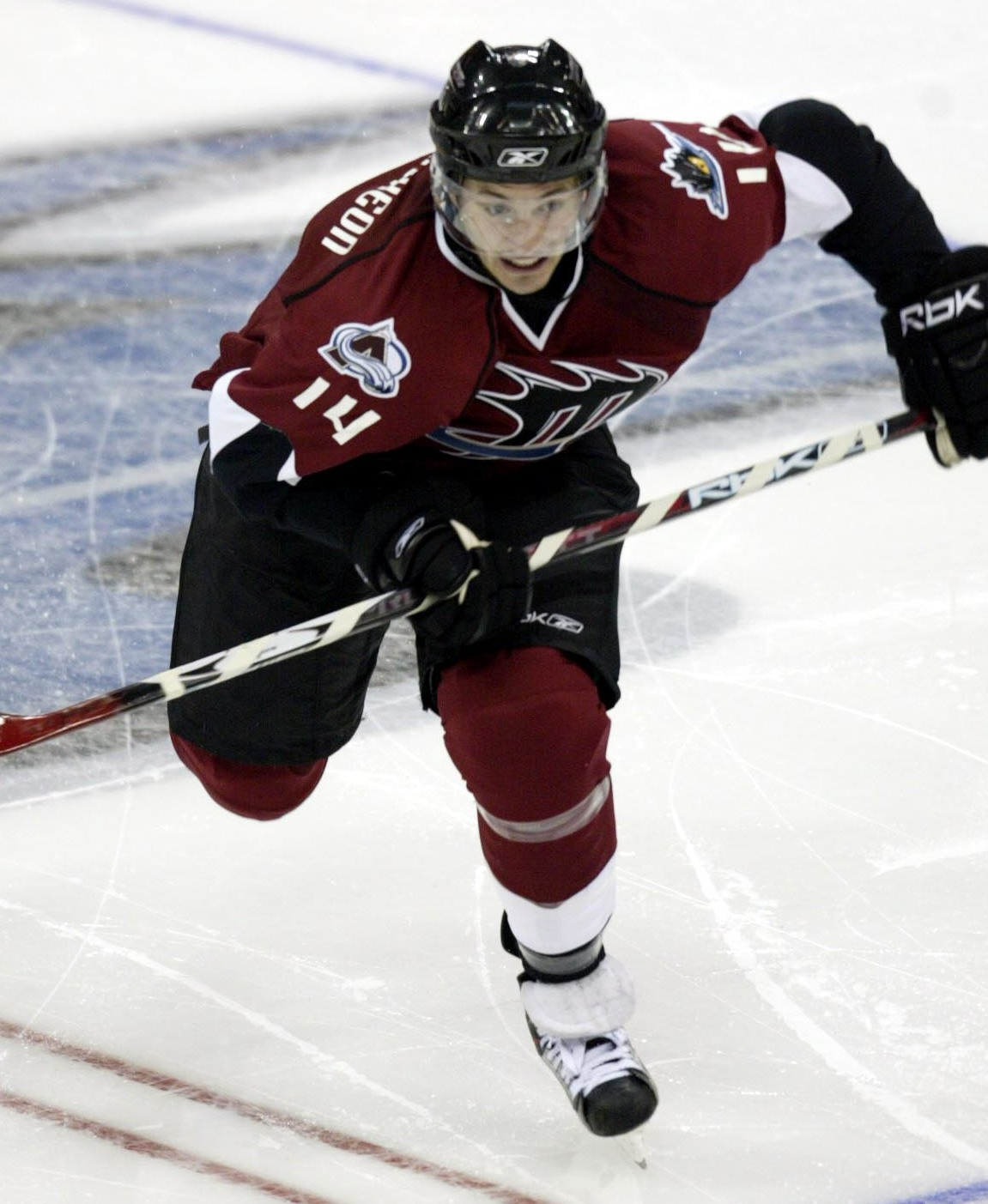
- McCutcheon with the Lake Erie Monsters in 2007
- Born: May 21, 1984 (age 41) Ithaca, New York, U.S.
- Height: 6 ft 0 in (183 cm)
- Weight: 190 lb (86 kg; 13 st 8 lb)
- Position: Center
- Shot: Right
- Played for: Lake Erie Monsters; Portland Pirates; Manitoba Moose; Vålerenga IF; DEG Metro Stars; HC Bolzano; Aalborg Pirates; Belfast Giants
- NHL draft: 146th overall, 2003; Colorado Avalanche
- Playing career: 2007–2015

Mark McCutcheon (born May 21, 1984, in Ithaca, New York) is an American former professional ice hockey player. Mark is the son of former Buffalo Sabres Associate Coach and former NHL player Brian McCutcheon.

== Playing career ==
McCutcheon was drafted 146th overall in the 2003 NHL entry draft by the Colorado Avalanche. Mark played collegiate hockey with Cornell University for four years before he made his professional debut in the 2007–08 season with Avalanche affiliate, the Lake Erie Monsters of the AHL. After two seasons with the Monsters, Mark left as a free agent leading the Monsters in games played by a forward with 128.

On October 9, 2009, Mark signed with the Idaho Steelheads of the ECHL for the 2009–10 season. McCutcheon played 3 games with the Steelheads, including scoring the first goal of the season for Idaho, before he was loaned to the Portland Pirates of the AHL on October 23, 2009. Despite scoring two goals in five games Mark was released from the Pirates. However before returning to the Steelheads he was signed by fellow AHL team, the Manitoba Moose, on November 3, 2009. Going scoreless in 12 games with the Moose, he was reunited with the Steelheads, posting 18 points in 15 post-season games to advance to the Kelly Cup finals before defeat to the Cincinnati Cyclones.

On August 2, 2010, Mark left North America and signed a one-year contract with Norwegian team Vålerenga of the GET-ligaen. Emerging as one of the league's best with 23 points in 16 games, Mark was noticed by German DEL team, DEG Metro Stars, and was offered an immediate one-year contract with the consent of Vålerenga on November 15, 2010.

Unable to replicate his success with the Metro Stars, McCutcheon left at season's conclusion and signed a contract with Italian Serie A club, HC Bolzano, on August 29, 2011. In his second season with Bolzano in 2012–13, McCutcheon led the team and finished 5th in league scoring with 60 points in 44 games.

On May 22, 2013, McCutcheon signed as a free agent to a one-year contract with no out clause in returning to former Norwegian club Vålerenga.

After a brief stint with Danish club, Aalborg Pirates of the Metal Ligaen, McCutcheon continued his journeyman career in signing a one-year contract with Northern Irish club, Belfast Giants of the EIHL on August 5, 2014.

== Career statistics ==
			Regular season					Playoffs
Season	Team	League	GP	G	A	Pts	PIM	GP	G	A	Pts	PIM
1999–2000	Rochester Jr. Americans	NAHL	2	0	0	0	0	—	—	—	—	—
2000–01	Buffalo Lightning	OPJHL	49	4	9	13	109	—	—	—	—	—
2001–02	New England Jr. Coyotes	EJHL	36	24	26	50	84	—	—	—	—	—
2002–03	New England Jr. Coyotes	EJHL	50	38	29	67	110	10	8	5	13	24
2003–04	Cornell University	ECAC	32	0	4	4	12	—	—	—	—	—
2004–05	Cornell University	ECAC	22	0	5	5	12	—	—	—	—	—
2005–06	Cornell University	ECAC	34	9	6	15	134	—	—	—	—	—
2006–07	Cornell University	ECAC	29	10	10	20	32	—	—	—	—	—
2007–08	Lake Erie Monsters	AHL	63	2	7	9	73	—	—	—	—	—
2008–09	Johnstown Chiefs	ECHL	9	3	1	4	14	—	—	—	—	—
2008–09	Lake Erie Monsters	AHL	65	6	11	17	70	—	—	—	—	—
2009–10	Idaho Steelheads	ECHL	34	14	32	46	52	15	8	10	18	14
2009–10	Portland Pirates	AHL	5	2	0	2	2	—	—	—	—	—
2009–10	Manitoba Moose	AHL	12	0	0	0	13	—	—	—	—	—
2010–11	Vålerenga	NOR	16	11	12	23	24	—	—	—	—	—
2010–11	DEG Metro Stars	DEL	33	3	5	8	8	9	0	0	0	2
2011–12	HC Bolzano	ITA	39	8	15	23	32	12	4	3	7	8
2012–13	HC Bolzano	ITA	44	26	34	60	20	6	3	2	5	4
2013–14	Vålerenga	NOR	30	7	18	25	16	—	—	—	—	—
2013–14	Aalborg Pirates	DEN	2	0	1	1	0	11	1	1	2	6
2014–15	Belfast Giants	EIHL	35	5	18	23	8	1	1	1	2	0
AHL totals			145	10	18	28	158	—	—	—	—	—
