= Krzysztof Kuźniecow =

Polish ice hockey player

- Born: 16 September 1968 (age 56); Bytom, Poland
- Height: 5 ft 10 in (178 cm)
- Weight: 181 lb (82 kg; 12 st 13 lb)
- Position: Forward
- Shot: Left
- Played for: Polonia Bytom; Zagłębie Sosnowiec; Cracovia
- National team: Poland
- Playing career: 1987–2010

Krzysztof Piotr Kuźniecow (born 16 September 1968) is a Polish former ice hockey player. He played for Polonia Bytom, Zagłębie Sosnowiec, and Cracovia during his career. With Polonia Bytom he won the Polish league championship four times, from 1988 to 1991. He also played for the Polish national team at the 1992 Winter Olympics and the 1992 World Championship.
