= Doug Nolan =

American ice hockey player

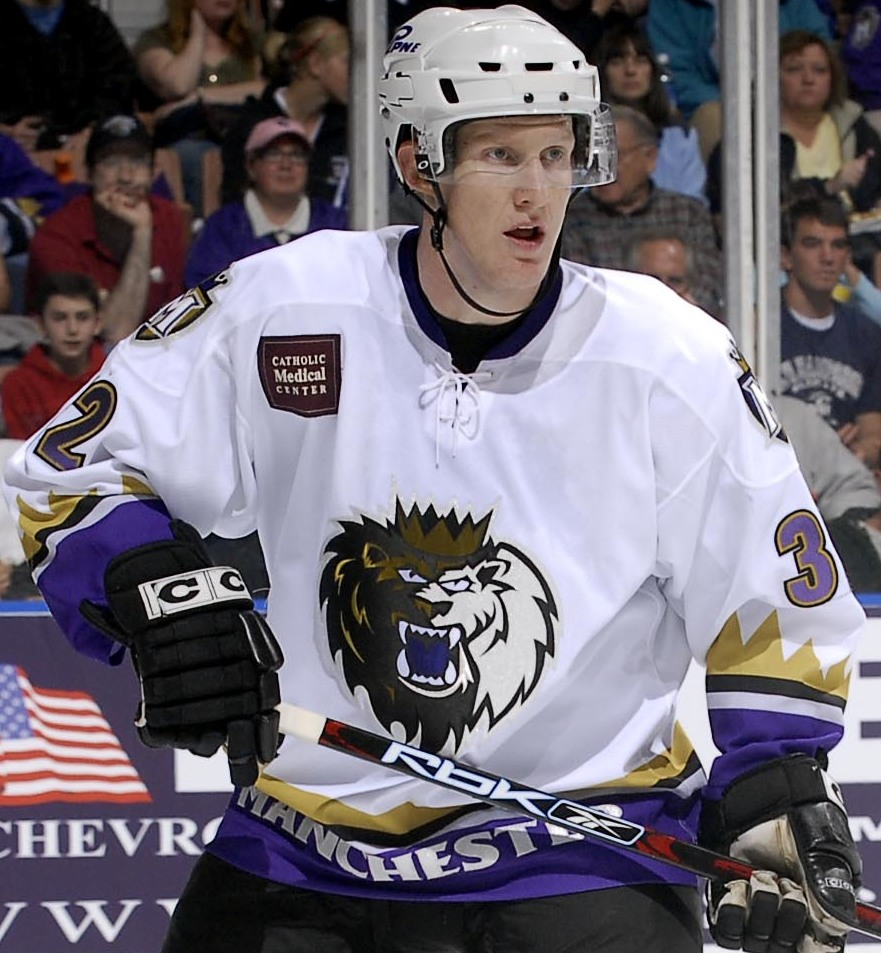
- Nolan with the Manchester Monarchs in 2006
- Born: January 5, 1976 (age 50) Quincy, Massachusetts, USA
- Height: 6 ft 2 in (188 cm)
- Weight: 220 lb (100 kg; 15 st 10 lb)
- Position: Defense
- Shot: Left
- Played for: Cincinnati Mighty Ducks; Bridgeport Sound Tigers; Hamilton Bulldogs; Manchester Monarchs; Graz 99ers HC Dinamo Minsk; Lukko Rauma; Vienna Capitals; Providence Bruins; HK Acroni Jesenice
- NHL draft: 282nd overall, 1994; Toronto Maple Leafs
- Playing career: 1999–2011

Doug Nolan (born January 5, 1976, in Quincy, Massachusetts) is an American former professional ice hockey defenseman. He was formerly on the collegiate coaching staff at Wentworth Institute of Technology.

== Playing career ==
Nolan was drafted 282nd overall by the Toronto Maple Leafs in the 1994 NHL entry draft, but never managed to play in the NHL. Nolan spent most of his career in the minor leagues of North American hockey, most notably playing with the Manchester Monarchs of the American Hockey League for five seasons before opting to pursue a European career.

Nolan joined Graz 99ers of the Austrian Hockey League in 2007. After one season he then moved on to HC Dinamo Minsk in the newly formed Kontinental Hockey League. He left Minsk after only 12 games on November 27, 2008, and moved to try out with Finnish club, Lukko Rauma. His trial with Lukko ended unsuccessfully and moved further to Frankfurt Lions without making an appearance before he left on January 9, 2009, to Austrian club the, Vienna Capitals.

== Career statistics ==
			Regular season					Playoffs
Season	Team	League	GP	G	A	Pts	PIM	GP	G	A	Pts	PIM
1995–96	UMass Lowell	HE	30	1	1	2	23	—	—	—	—	—
1996–97	UMass Lowell	HE	38	10	14	24	66	—	—	—	—	—
1997–98	UMass Lowell	HE	35	8	15	23	57	—	—	—	—	—
1998–99	UMass Lowell	HE	25	8	5	13	41	—	—	—	—	—
1999–00	Dayton Bombers	ECHL	52	6	8	14	64	3	0	1	1	6
1999–00	Cincinnati Mighty Ducks	AHL	2	0	1	1	0	—	—	—	—	—
2000–01	Dayton Bombers	ECHL	42	1	12	13	137	—	—	—	—	—
2000–01	Cincinnati Mighty Ducks	AHL	13	0	4	4	6	3	0	1	1	2
2001–02	Dayton Bombers	ECHL	60	5	4	9	166	14	1	2	3	38
2001–02	Bridgeport Sound Tigers	AHL	7	0	1	1	4	—	—	—	—	—
2002–03	Dayton Bombers	ECHL	49	4	13	17	85	—	—	—	—	—
2002–03	Hamilton Bulldogs	AHL	2	0	0	0	0	—	—	—	—	—
2002–03	Manchester Monarchs	AHL	10	1	1	2	6	—	—	—	—	—
2003–04	Manchester Monarchs	AHL	49	0	3	3	30	—	—	—	—	—
2003–04	Reading Royals	ECHL	7	0	2	2	16	15	1	3	4	16
2004–05	Manchester Monarchs	AHL	60	1	5	6	167	4	0	0	0	21
2005–06	Manchester Monarchs	AHL	58	1	3	4	92	7	0	1	1	13
2006–07	Manchester Monarchs	AHL	64	2	9	11	124	16	0	3	3	25
2007–08	Graz 99ers	EBEL	39	2	8	10	90	—	—	—	—	—
2008–09	HC Dinamo Minsk	KHL	12	0	2	2	28	—	—	—	—	—
2008–09	Lukko Rauma	SM-l	3	0	1	1	0	—	—	—	—	—
2008–09	Vienna Capitals	EBEL	4	0	0	0	6	7	0	2	2	10
2009–10	Manchester Monarchs	AHL	19	0	3	3	31	—	—	—	—	—
2009–10	Providence Bruins	AHL	3	0	1	1	11	—	—	—	—	—
2010–11	HK Acroni Jesenice	EBEL	39	7	8	15	115	—	—	—	—	—
AHL totals			287	5	31	36	471	30	0	5	5	66

Awards and achievements
Preceded by Chris Drury	Hockey East Best Defensive Forward; 1998–99	Succeeded by John Sadowski
