= Rob Hisey =

Canadian ice hockey player

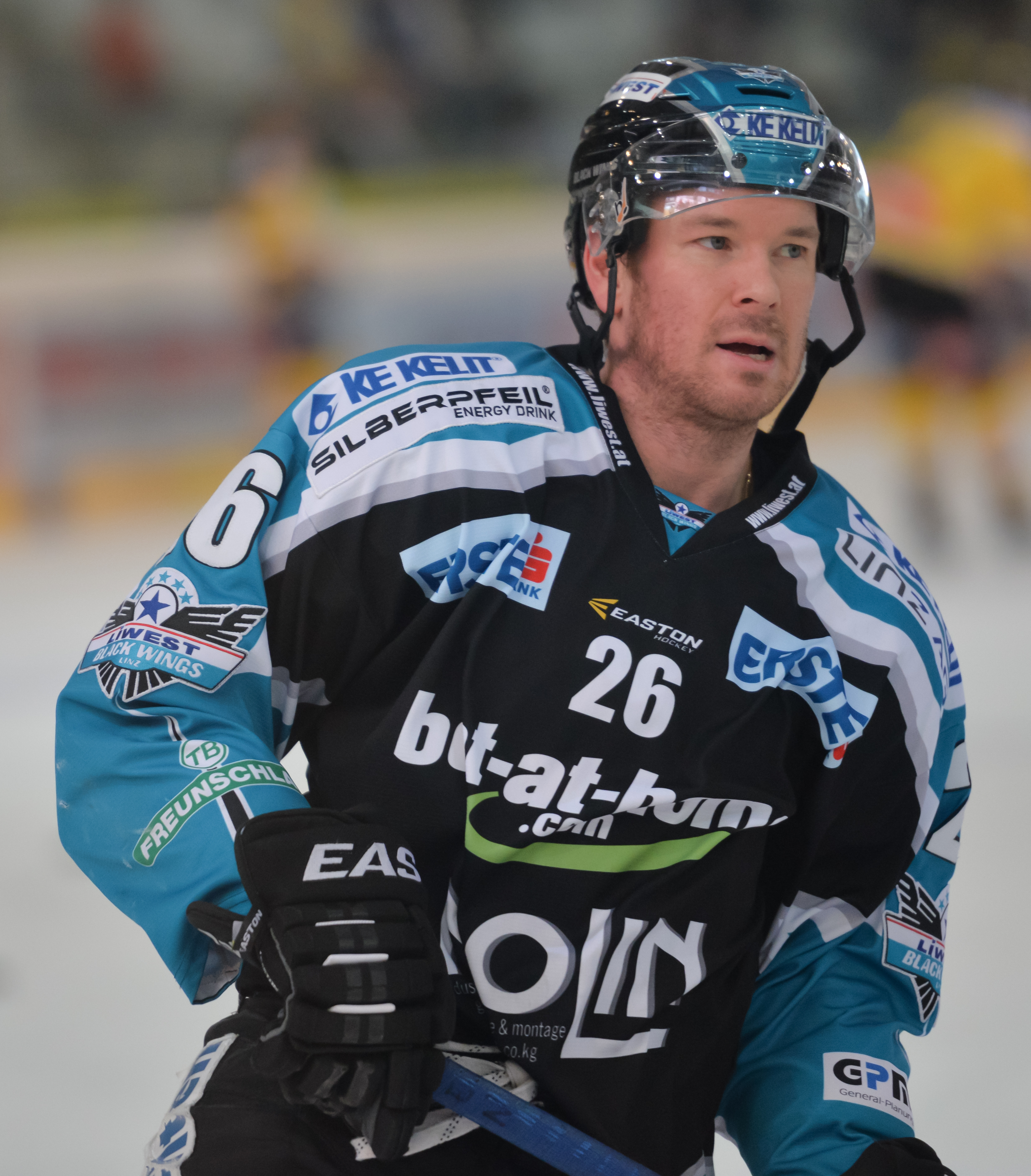
- Born: September 24, 1984 (age 41) Oakville, Ontario, Canada
- Height: 5 ft 9 in (175 cm)
- Weight: 180 lb (82 kg; 12 st 12 lb)
- Position: Centre
- Shot: Left
- Played for: Ässät; Hannover Scorpions; Graz 99ers Mora IK; Springfield Falcons; Bridgeport Sound Tigers; EHC Black Wings Linz; Grizzlys Wolfsburg
- NHL draft: Undrafted
- Playing career: 2005–2017

Rob Hisey (born September 24, 1984) is a Canadian former professional ice hockey player. He last played for the Grizzlys Wolfsburg in the Deutsche Eishockey Liga (DEL).

== Playing career ==
Hisey played in the OHL, UCHL and ECHL until 2005. Undrafted, he took his game overseas, playing for Ässät of Finland in 2005–06, followed by stints in Germany (Hannover Scorpions) and another stay at Ässät, before representing Austrian side Graz 99ers and Mora IK in Sweden. He then spent the 2008–09 season with the Hannover Indians in Germany. In the 2009-10 campaign, Hisey split time between CHL's Tulsa Oilers and the Springfield Falcons of the AHL.

On August 18, 2010, Hisey was signed as an unrestricted free agent to a one-year two-way contract by the New York Islanders. He was assigned to American Hockey League affiliate, the Bridgeport Sound Tigers, for the duration of the 2010–11 season.

Despite scoring 48 points in 59 games with the Sound Tigers, Hisey never played with the Islanders and on April 29, 2011, signed a one-year contract with Austrian club, EHC Black Wings Linz. He won the Austrian championship with Linz in 2012 and eventually stayed with the team until mid-February 2017, when he signed with the Grizzlys Wolfsburg of the German DEL.

== Personal ==
Rob and his wife Brooke have three sons, Hudson, Cohen and Colton.

== Career statistics ==
			Regular season					Playoffs
Season	Team	League	GP	G	A	Pts	PIM	GP	G	A	Pts	PIM
2000–01	Aurora Tigers	OPJHL	49	27	41	68	44	—	—	—	—	—
2001–02	Sault Ste. Marie Greyhounds	OHL	68	20	33	53	33	6	0	0	0	6
2002–03	Sault Ste. Marie Greyhounds	OHL	23	9	16	25	10	—	—	—	—	—
2002–03	Erie Otters	OHL	50	19	30	49	46	—	—	—	—	—
2003–04	Erie Otters	OHL	63	38	58	96	63	8	2	3	5	8
2003–04	Port Huron Beacons	UHL	—	—	—	—	—	6	3	6	9	4
2004–05	Erie Otters	OHL	25	8	26	34	41	—	—	—	—	—
2004–05	Barrie Colts	OHL	41	21	31	52	40	6	2	8	10	6
2004–05	Reading Royals	ECHL	—	—	—	—	—	7	2	2	4	2
2005–06	Ässät	SM-l	46	12	13	25	101	14	4	2	6	40
2006–07	Hannover Scorpions	DEL	51	12	17	29	54	6	0	1	1	8
2007–08	Ässät	SM-l	14	2	4	6	16	—	—	—	—	—
2007–08	Graz 99ers	EBEL	22	3	13	16	36	—	—	—	—	—
2007–08	Mora IK	SEL	12	6	4	10	10	—	—	—	—	—
2008–09	Hannover Indians	3.GBun	34	19	39	58	137	7	10	8	18	8
2009–10	Tulsa Oilers	CHL	24	19	22	41	27	—	—	—	—	—
2009–10	Springfield Falcons	AHL	37	11	14	25	29	—	—	—	—	—
2010–11	Bridgeport Sound Tigers	AHL	59	16	32	48	42	—	—	—	—	—
2011–12	EHC Black Wings Linz	EBEL	48	11	30	41	30	17	7	15	22	42
2012–13	EHC Black Wings Linz	EBEL	44	15	27	42	45	13	4	6	10	4
2013–14	EHC Black Wings Linz	EBEL	47	7	27	34	31	8	1	6	7	4
2014–15	EHC Black Wings Linz	EBEL	54	13	40	53	64	9	1	6	7	2
2015–16	EHC Black Wings Linz	EBEL	46	8	21	29	26	12	1	5	6	18
2016–17	EHC Black Wings Linz	EBEL	27	7	20	27	27	—	—	—	—	—
2016–17	Grizzlys Wolfsburg	DEL	4	0	3	3	2	8	0	1	1	4
AHL totals			96	27	46	73	71	—	—	—	—	—
