= Jarkko Varvio =

Finnish former ice hockey player (born 1972)

- Born: April 28, 1972 (age 54) Tampere, Finland
- Height: 5 ft 10 in (178 cm)
- Weight: 180 lb (82 kg; 12 st 12 lb)
- Position: Right wing
- Shot: Right
- Played for: Ilves Tampere; Dallas Stars; HPK; Lukko; Tappara; HV71; Rapperswil-Jona Lakers; HC TPS; REV Bremerhaven; EV Ravensburg
- National team: Finland
- NHL draft: 34th overall, 1992; Minnesota North Stars
- Playing career: 1992–2005

Jarkko Varvio (April 28, 1972) is a Finnish former ice hockey player who had a very brief stint in the NHL. Varvio was drafted by Minnesota North Stars in the 1992 NHL entry draft. He was the top scorer at the 1992 Men's World Ice Hockey Championships in Czechoslovakia. However, his only two active seasons in the NHL were in 1993-94 and 1994-95 with the Dallas Stars. In 13 career games, he notched three goals, four assists (for seven points), and had four penalty minutes. Jarkko scored his first NHL goal in his first NHL game, which was also the first game Dallas Stars played as the Stars since leaving Minnesota. After his time with the Stars Varvio bounced around Europe playing in various leagues. Varvio last played for Ravensburg EV in Germany's GerObL before retiring in 2005.

== Career statistics ==
=== Regular season and playoffs ===
			Regular season					Playoffs
Season	Team	League	GP	G	A	Pts	PIM	GP	G	A	Pts	PIM
1988–89	Ilves	FIN U18	20	32	27	59	44	5	7	2	9	0
1989–90	Ilves	FIN U20	31	34	14	48	10	3	4	1	5	0
1989–90	Ilves	SM-l	1	0	0	0	0	—	—	—	—	—
1990–91	Ilves	FIN U20	7	10	7	17	12	7	6	6	12	2
1990–91	Ilves	SM-l	37	10	7	17	6	—	—	—	—	—
1991–92	HPK	FIN U20	1	4	2	6	0	—	—	—	—	—
1991–92	HPK	SM-l	41	25	9	34	6	—	—	—	—	—
1992–93	HPK	FIN U20	2	3	2	5	4	—	—	—	—	—
1992–93	HPK	SM-l	40	29	19	48	16	12	3	2	5	8
1993–94	Dallas Stars	NHL	8	2	3	5	4	—	—	—	—	—
1993–94	Kalamazoo Wings	IHL	58	29	16	45	18	1	0	0	0	0
1994–95	HPK	SM-l	19	7	8	15	4	—	—	—	—	—
1994–95	Dallas Stars	NHL	5	1	1	2	0	—	—	—	—	—
1994–95	Kalamazoo Wings	IHL	7	0	0	0	2	—	—	—	—	—
1995–96	Lukko	SM-l	47	14	13	27	32	8	5	0	5	4
1996–97	Lukko	SM-l	40	9	11	20	40	—	—	—	—	—
1997–98	Tappara	SM-l	47	19	13	32	22	4	0	2	2	4
1998–99	HV71	SEL	13	1	1	2	4	—	—	—	—	—
1998–99	AIK	SEL	27	17	10	27	8	—	—	—	—	—
1999–2000	AIK	SEL	26	4	9	13	12	—	—	—	—	—
1999–2000	SC Rapperswil–Jona	NLA	12	7	6	13	2	—	—	—	—	—
2000–01	TPS	SM-l	52	15	12	27	10	10	0	0	0	0
2001–02	REV Bremerhaven	GER.2	37	19	30	49	10	10	4	3	7	4
2002–03	Fischtown Penguins	GER.2	47	13	24	37	18	—	—	—	—	—
2003–04	Fischtown Penguins	GER.3	59	46	37	83	38	—	—	—	—	—
2004–05	EV Ravensburg	GER.3	43	25	27	52	46	2	0	0	0	0
SM-l totals			324	128	92	220	136	34	8	4	12	16
NHL totals			13	3	4	7	4	—	—	—	—	—

=== International ===
Year	Team	Event	GP	G	A	Pts	PIM
1990	Finland	EJC	6	4	1	5	4
1991	Finland	WJC	7	5	4	9	4
1992	Finland	WJC	7	8	1	9	8
1992	Finland	WC	8	9	1	10	4
1993	Finland	WC	6	2	0	2	6
1997	Finland	WC	8	0	0	0	4
Junior totals			20	17	6	23	16
Senior totals			22	11	1	12	14
