= Tommy Kiviaho =

Finnish ice hockey player

- Born: 27 June 1971 (age 54) Helsinki, FIN
- Height: 6 ft 2 in (188 cm)
- Weight: 185 lb (84 kg; 13 st 3 lb)
- Position: Left wing
- Shot: Left
- Played for: Kiekko-Espoo; Hockey-Reipas; Reipas Lahti; Ilves; HIFK; MODO; HC Litvínov; Augsburger Panther; Ässät; HC Slovan Bratislava; Vålerenga; Lillehammer IK; Frisk Tigers; Stjernen; EC Dornbirn; EHC Lustenau
- National team: Finland
- Playing career: 1989–2008

Tommy Kiviaho (born 27 June 1971) is a Finnish former professional ice hockey player. He played with numerous clubs during his career, HC Slovan Bratislava in the Slovak Extraliga was one of them.

== Career statistics ==
=== Regular season and playoffs ===
			Regular season					Playoffs
Season	Team	League	GP	G	A	Pts	PIM	GP	G	A	Pts	PIM
1989–90	Kiekko-Espoo	1.div	28	3	5	8	8	—	—	—	—	—
1990–91	Kiekko-Espoo	1.div	42	21	14	35	22	—	—	—	—	—
1991–92	Hockey-Reipas	SM-l	44	10	11	21	11	—	—	—	—	—
1992–93	Kiekko-Espoo	SM-l	48	8	3	11	14	—	—	—	—	—
1993–94	Reipas Lahti	SM-l	48	25	12	37	20	—	—	—	—	—
1994–95	Ilves	SM-l	49	6	15	21	14	—	—	—	—	—
1995–96	KOO-VEE	1.div	3	1	2	3	2	—	—	—	—	—
1995–96	HIFK	SM-l	41	16	14	30	22	3	1	0	1	4
1996–97	Ilves	SM-l	4	0	2	2	4	—	—	—	—	—
1996–97	MODO	SEL	10	1	0	1	2	—	—	—	—	—
1996–97	HC Litvínov	CZE	2	0	0	0	0	—	—	—	—	—
1996–97	Augsburger Panther	DEL	36	15	14	29	20	—	—	—	—	—
1997–98	Ässät	SM-l	37	9	14	23	28	3	0	1	1	0
1998–99	Blues	SM-l	54	10	16	26	16	4	0	1	1	4
1999–00	Blues	SM-l	53	14	15	29	14	4	1	2	3	0
2000–01	EPS	2.div	10	4	10	14	8	—	—	—	—	—
2000–01	HC Slovan Bratislava	SVK	3	1	0	1	0	—	—	—	—	—
2000–01	Vålerenga	NOR	25	20	18	38	14	—	—	—	—	—
2001–02	Lillehammer IK	NOR	40	26	37	63	75	—	—	—	—	—
2002–03	Frisk Tigers	NOR	35	24	34	58	26	—	—	—	—	—
2003–04	Frisk Tigers	NOR	41	27	27	54	20	—	—	—	—	—
2004–05	Stjernen	NOR	34	16	16	32	10	7	1	1	2	8
2005–06	EC Dornbirn	AUT.2	34	43	42	85	22	—	—	—	—	—
2006–07	EHC Lustenau	AUT.2	32	45	53	98	22	7	6	10	16	6
2007–08	EHC Lustenau	AUT.2	32	39	51	90	41	7	5	10	15	8
SM-l totals			378	98	102	200	143	14	2	4	6	8

=== International ===
Year	Team	Comp	GP	G	A	Pts	PIM
1989	Finland	EJC18	6	6	7	13	4
1991	Finland	WJC	6	1	2	3	2
Junior int'l totals			12	7	9	16	6
