= Roy Johansen =

Norwegian ice hockey player and coach

- Born: 27 April 1960 (age 64); Oslo, Norway
- Height: 5 ft 11 in (180 cm)
- Weight: 185 lb (84 kg; 13 st 3 lb)
- Position: Centre
- Shot: Left
- Played for: Vålerenga Ishockey; Sparta Warriors; Bergen Flyers
- National team: Norway
- Playing career: 1979–1994

Roy Einar Johansen (born 27 April 1960) is a Norwegian professional ice hockey head coach, currently serving as the head coach of Frisk Asker of the EliteHockey Ligaen. He previously played for the Norwegian national ice hockey team. He participated at the Winter Olympics in 1984, 1988, and 1994.

He was the head coach of the Norwegian national team from 2001 until 2016. Johansen stepped down as national team coach in May 2016 and returned to Vålerenga Ishockey as head coach.
