= Patric Englund =

Swedish ice hockey player

- Born: June 3, 1970 (age 55) Stockholm, Sweden
- Height: 6 ft 0 in (183 cm)
- Weight: 187 lb (85 kg; 13 st 5 lb)
- Position: Left wing
- Shot: Left
- Played for: AIK IF; HV71; Vålerenga
- NHL draft: 151st overall, 1990; Philadelphia Flyers
- Playing career: 1988–2004

Patric Englund (born June 3, 1970) is a former Swedish professional ice hockey player who played in the Swedish Hockey League and Norwegian GET-ligaen. Englund was drafted in the eighth round of the 1990 NHL entry draft by the Philadelphia Flyers, but he never played professionally in North America. He spent the first ten seasons of his professional career in Sweden, playing nine seasons with AIK IF, and the final six seasons of his career in Norway with Vålerenga.

== Career statistics ==
			Regular season					Playoffs
Season	Team	League	GP	G	A	Pts	PIM	GP	G	A	Pts	PIM
1988–89	AIK IF	SHL	19	2	3	5	6	—	—	—	—	—
1989–90	AIK IF	SHL	31	11	7	18	2	3	0	0	0	12
1990–91	AIK IF	SHL	40	9	6	15	4	—	—	—	—	—
1991–92	AIK IF	SHL	39	8	5	13	6	—	—	—	—	—
1992–93	AIK IF	SHL	22	2	1	3	8	—	—	—	—	—
1992–93	AIK IF	Division 1	16	3	5	8	6	—	—	—	—	—
1993–94	AIK IF	Division 1	40	17	30	47	20	—	—	—	—	—
1994–95	AIK IF	SHL	39	11	12	23	18	—	—	—	—	—
1995–96	AIK IF	SHL	33	6	4	10	22	—	—	—	—	—
1996–97	AIK IF	SHL	50	8	5	13	14	7	0	0	0	2
1997–98	HV71	SHL	45	4	4	8	6	5	0	0	0	4
1998–99	Vålerenga	Norway	42	25	29	54	10	—	—	—	—	—
1999–00	Vålerenga	Norway	40	30	29	59	22	—	—	—	—	—
2000–01	Vålerenga	Norway	39	20	30	50	14	—	—	—	—	—
2001–02	Vålerenga	Norway	42	20	31	51	33	4	2	2	4	2
2002–03	Vålerenga	Norway	32	18	18	36	2	—	—	—	—	—
2003–04	Vålerenga	Norway	40	21	23	44	20	—	—	—	—	—
SHL totals			318	61	47	108	86	15	0	0	0	18
Norway totals			235	134	160	294	101	4	2	2	4	2
