= Marco Scapinello =

Italian ice hockey player

Personal information
- Nationality: Italian
- Born: 18 February 1964 (age 62) Cortina d'Ampezzo, Italy

Sport
- Sport: Ice hockey

Marco Scapinello (born 18 February 1964) is an Italian ice hockey player. He competed in the men's tournament at the 1992 Winter Olympics.
