= Brede Frettem Csiszar =

Norwegian ice hockey player (born 1987)

- Born: March 26, 1987 (age 38) Oslo, Norway
- Height: 6 ft 0 in (183 cm)
- Weight: 181 lb (82 kg; 12 st 13 lb)
- Position: Defence
- Shot: Right
- Played for: Vålerenga; Mora IK
- National team: Norway
- Playing career: 2006–2019

Brede Frettem Csiszar (born March 26, 1987) is a retired Norwegian professional ice hockey defenceman who participated at the 2010- and 2011 IIHF World Championships as a member of the Norway men's national ice hockey team.

== Personal life ==
In July 2023, Csiszar announced that he and his fiancée, international handball player Amanda Kurtović are expecting their first child.
