= Roy Jansen =

Norwegian ice hockey player

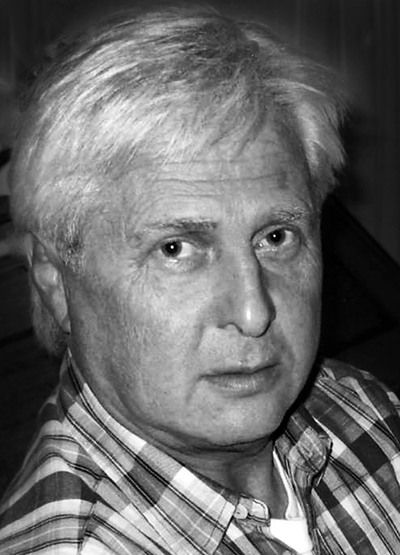
- Born: 6 May 1950 (age 76) Oslo, Norway
- Position: Left wing
- Played for: Vålerengens IF
- National team: Norway
- Playing career: 1966–1984

Roy Jansen (born 6 May 1950) is a Norwegian ice hockey player.

== Life and career ==
Born in Oslo, Norway on 6 May 1950, Jansen represented the clubs IL Sparta and Vålerengens IF. He played 73 world championship and Olympic matches for the Norwegian national ice hockey team, and participated at the Winter Olympics in Sapporo in 1972, where the Norwegian team placed 8th.

Jansen won six national titles with Vålerenga, first time in 1968, and further titles in 1969, 1970, 1971, 1973, and 1982. He played a total of 432 matches and scored 241 goals during his 18 seasons with Vålerenga.
