= Tor Gundersen =

Norwegian ice hockey player

Tor «Jern-Gustav» Gundersen (September 15, 1935 – September 13, 2012) was a Norwegian ice hockey player. He played for the Norwegian national ice hockey team, and participated at the Winter Olympics in 1964 and in 1968. He was awarded Gullpucken as best Norwegian ice hockey player in 1960. He was a playing head coach for Vålerenga Ishockey during the team's golden age in the 1960s and has ten championships in his name.
