= Petter Thoresen (ice hockey) =

Norwegian ice hockey player and coach

- Born: 25 July 1961 (age 65) Oslo, Norway
- Height: 6 ft 0 in (183 cm)
- Weight: 187 lb (85 kg; 13 st 5 lb)
- Position: Right wing
- Shot: Right
- GET team Former teams: Stavanger Oilers; Storhamar Dragons; Vålerenga; Manglerud Star; Hasle/Løren; Forward
- National team: Norway
- Playing career: 1980–1995

Petter Thoresen (born 25 July 1961) is a Norwegian ice hockey coach and former player, currently serving as head coach of Storhamar Hockey, where he has been in charge since June 2022. He played for Forward, Hasle/Løren, Manglerud Star, Storhamar Dragons and Vålerenga. He is the father of players Steffen Thoresen and Patrick Thoresen.

== Playing career ==
In Vålerenga, he reached 367 points in 220 games, which gives him a fourth place on the club's all-time high list.

Before the 1992–93 season, he transferred to Storhamar Dragons, where he obtained 155 points in 150 matches.

== Coaching career ==
Half-way through the 1995/1996 season, he became a manager for Storhamar Dragons, and led them to the Norwegian title, his first as a coach. In 2000 he signed with Vålerenga, and served as their coach until 2004, when he went back to Storhamar Dragons to help them get stability in a struggling team. In 2009 he signed a 3-year contract with Stavanger Oilers. He left Oilers in 2016 to become the head coach of the Norwegian national team. In 2022 he returned to being the Head Coach of Storhamar Hockey and has led them to multiple championships. In 2026, with continued middling performances for the Norwegian National Team and an influx of young, NHL drafted talent, he returned to coach them and helped Norway reach their first Knockout Stage in the 16 team IIHF Top Division era and their first medal.

== International career ==
He has played 96 matches for the Norwegian national team, which makes him the fifth most featured player on the national team. He appeared at five Olympics, the first in 1980 and last in 1994, becoming the second hockey player to do so after Germany's Udo Kießling.

== Championships ==
- Player:
- Vålerenga:
- 1984/1985 - Norwegian Champions
- 1986/1987 - Norwegian Champions
- 1987/1988 - Norwegian Champions
- 1990/1991 - Norwegian Champions
- Coach:
- Storhamar Dragons:
- 1995/1996 - Norwegian Champions
- 1996/1997 - Norwegian Champions
- 1999/2000 - Norwegian Champions
- 2023/2024 - Norwegian Champions
- 2024/2025 - Norwegian Champions
- 2025/2026 - Norwegian Champions
- Vålerenga:
- 2000/2001 - Norwegian Champions
- 2003/2004 - Norwegian Champions
- Stavanger Oilers:
- 2009/2010 - Norwegian Champions
- 2011/2012 - Norwegian Champions
- 2012/2013 - Norwegian Champions
- 2013/2014 - Norwegian Champions
- 2014/2015 - Norwegian Champions
- 2015/2016 - Norwegian Champions
