= Andreas Ton =

Italian-born Swiss ice hockey player

- Born: September 21, 1962 (age 62); Italy
- Height: 5 ft 10 in (178 cm)
- Weight: 176 lb (80 kg; 12 st 8 lb)
- Position: Right wing
- Shot: Left
- NLA team Former teams: HC Lugano; EHC Chur; ZSC Lions
- National team: Switzerland
- Playing career: 1982–1998

Andreas Ton (born September 21, 1962) is a former Italian-born Swiss professional ice hockey right winger who last played for HC Lugano in Switzerland's National League A.

Ton has participated as a member of the Swiss national team in numerous international tournaments, including the 1992 Winter Olympics.
