= Fredrik Andersson (ice hockey) =

Swedish ice hockey player and coach

Fredrik Andersson (born 28 February 1968) is a former Swedish ice hockey goaltender. He currently serves as head coach for Vålerenga Ishockey in Norway.
