= Martino Soracreppa =

Italian ice hockey player

Personal information
- Nationality: Italian
- Born: 9 May 1968 (age 56); Bolzano, Italy

Sport
- Sport: Ice hockey

Martino Soracreppa (born 9 May 1968) is an Italian ice hockey player. He competed in the men's tournament at the 1992 Winter Olympics.
