= Timo Saarikoski =

Finnish ice hockey player

Personal information
- Nationality: Finnish
- Born: 17 July 1969 (age 55); Kiukainen, Finland

Sport
- Sport: Ice hockey

Timo Saarikoski (born 17 July 1969) is a Finnish ice hockey player. He competed in the men's tournament at the 1992 Winter Olympics.

== Career statistics ==
=== Regular season and playoffs ===
			Regular season					Playoffs
Season	Team	League	GP	G	A	Pts	PIM	GP	G	A	Pts	PIM
1987–88	Ässät	FIN U20	26	13	13	26	4	—	—	—	—	—
1987–88	Ässät	SM-l	27	0	13	13	8	—	—	—	—	—
1988–89	Ässät	SM-l	40	6	23	29	4	—	—	—	—	—
1989–90	Lukko	SM-l	42	14	20	34	4	—	—	—	—	—
1990–91	Lukko	SM-l	44	8	21	29	14	—	—	—	—	—
1991–92	Lukko	SM-l	43	16	25	41	14	2	0	0	0	0
1992–93	Lukko	SM-l	48	7	24	31	16	3	0	1	1	2
1993–94	Jokerit	SM-l	47	18	19	37	19	12	4	5	9	6
1994–95	Jokerit	SM-l	47	12	18	30	26	8	2	2	4	4
1995–96	Haukat	FIN.2	1	1	1	2	0	—	—	—	—	—
1995–96	Jokerit	SM-l	29	5	7	12	14	11	2	5	7	10
1996–97	Jokerit	SM-l	50	14	36	50	49	9	2	2	4	4
1997–98	Jokerit	SM-l	23	3	7	10	12	—	—	—	—	—
1998–99	Jokerit	SM-l	20	3	6	9	14	—	—	—	—	—
1998–99	Ässät	SM-l	32	8	11	19	16	—	—	—	—	—
1999–2000	SaiPa	SM-l	49	16	30	46	40	—	—	—	—	—
2000–01	Jokerit	SM-l	50	9	9	18	30	—	—	—	—	—
SM-l totals			591	139	269	408	280	45	10	15	25	26

=== International ===
Year	Team	Event	GP	G	A	Pts	PIM
1987	Finland	EJC
1989	Finland	WJC	7	2	6	8	0
1992	Finland	OG	8	0	0	0	0
1992	Finland	WC	8	3	4	7	4
1993	Finland	WC	6	0	1	1	2
Senior totals			22	3	5	8	6

"Timo Saarikoski". Elite Prospects.
