= 1992 Men's Ice Hockey World Championships =

1992 edition of the Men's World Ice Hockey Championships

Tournament details
- Host country: Czechoslovakia
- Venues: 2 (in 2 host cities)
- Dates: 28 April – 10 May
- Teams: 12

Final positions
- Champions: Sweden (6th title)
- Runners-up: Finland
- Third place: Czechoslovakia
- Fourth place: Switzerland

Tournament statistics
- Games played: 39
- Goals scored: 242 (6.21 per game)
- Attendance: 249,748 (6,404 per game)
- Scoring leader: (Finland) Jarkko Varvio 10 points

The 1992 Men's Ice Hockey World Championships was the 56th such event sanctioned by the International Ice Hockey Federation (IIHF). Teams representing a record 32 countries participated in several levels of competition. The competition also served as qualifications for group placements in the 1993 competition.

The top Championship Group A tournament took place in Czechoslovakia from 28 April to 10 May 1992, with games played in Prague and Bratislava. This would be the last championship held in that nation before the dissolution of Czechoslovakia eight months later. Twelve teams took part, with the first round being split into two groups of six, with the four best teams from each group advancing to the quarter-finals. Sweden retained their title, beating Finland 5–2 in the final, and becoming world champions for the sixth time. This was Finland's first medal in a World Championship.

The Championship Group A pools were drawn the same as the 1992 Olympics in Albertville two months earlier, but yielded much different results. Switzerland was able to tie both Russia and Canada to earn a spot in the quarter-finals. Germany, after an opening loss to Finland, won four straight to also advance to the quarter-finals, where they faced Switzerland. The Swiss prevailed, making the top 4 for the first time since 1953, and moved on to meet a Swedish team that had shut-out the Russians. The Swedes led by three after the first and easily moved on to the gold medal game. There was nothing easy about the other semi-final, where the Finns had to come from behind to tie Czechoslovakia in the third period, then advanced to the finals with a shootout win. The Czechoslovaks, playing for the last time as that nation, beat the Swiss to settle for bronze, while Sweden, led by Mats Sundin, beat Finland for gold.

New entrants Greece, Israel, Luxembourg and Turkey iced teams in a secondary tier of Group C. South Africa appeared for the first time since 1966. In Group B, the Socialist Federal Republic of Yugoslavia made their final World Championship appearance before the breakup of that nation. The Federal Republic of Yugoslavia resumed Yugoslavia's former position in Group C in 1995, while breakaway nations Croatia and Slovenia would appear in the qualifiers for Group C of the 1993 World Championship.

== World Championship Group A (Czechoslovakia) ==
=== Venues ===
| Prague | Locations of the two venues in Czechoslovakia. | Bratislava |
| Sportovní hala ČSTV; Capacity: 14,000 | Locations of the two venues in Czechoslovakia. | Štadión Ondreja Nepelu; Capacity: 7,747 |

=== Group 1 ===
| Pos | Team | Pld | W | D | L | GF | GA | GD | Pts |
|---|---|---|---|---|---|---|---|---|---|
| 1 | Finland | 5 | 5 | 0 | 0 | 32 | 8 | +24 | 10 |
| 2 | Germany | 5 | 4 | 0 | 1 | 30 | 14 | +16 | 8 |
| 3 | United States | 5 | 2 | 1 | 2 | 14 | 15 | −1 | 5 |
| 4 | Sweden | 5 | 1 | 2 | 2 | 14 | 12 | +2 | 4 |
| 5 | Italy | 5 | 1 | 1 | 3 | 10 | 18 | −8 | 3 |
| 6 | Poland | 5 | 0 | 0 | 5 | 8 | 41 | −33 | 0 |

| 28 April | Sweden | 7–0 | Poland |

| 28 April | Germany | 3–6 | Finland |

| 28 April | Italy | 0–1 | United States |

| 29 April | Finland | 11–2 | Poland |

| 29 April | United States | 3–5 | Germany |

| 29 April | Sweden | 0–0 | Italy |

| 1 May | Poland | 5–7 | Italy |

| 1 May | Germany | 5–2 | Sweden |

| 1 May | United States | 1–6 | Finland |

| 3 May | United States | 5–0 | Poland |

| 3 May | Italy | 2–6 | Germany |

| 3 May | Finland | 3–1 | Sweden |

| 4 May | Poland | 1–11 | Germany |

| 4 May | Finland | 6–1 | Italy |

| 4 May | Sweden | 4–4 | United States |

=== Group 2 ===
| Pos | Team | Pld | W | D | L | GF | GA | GD | Pts |
|---|---|---|---|---|---|---|---|---|---|
| 1 | Russia | 5 | 4 | 1 | 0 | 23 | 10 | +13 | 9 |
| 2 | Czechoslovakia | 5 | 4 | 0 | 1 | 18 | 7 | +11 | 8 |
| 3 | Switzerland | 5 | 2 | 2 | 1 | 12 | 11 | +1 | 6 |
| 4 | Canada | 5 | 2 | 1 | 2 | 15 | 18 | −3 | 5 |
| 5 | Norway | 5 | 1 | 0 | 4 | 8 | 16 | −8 | 2 |
| 6 | France | 5 | 0 | 0 | 5 | 8 | 22 | −14 | 0 |

| 28 April | Canada | 4–3 | France |

| 28 April | Switzerland | 2–2 | Russia |

| 28 April | Czechoslovakia | 6–1 | Norway |

| 30 April | Canada | 1–1 | Switzerland |

| 30 April | Czechoslovakia | 3–0 | France |

| 30 April | Russia | 3–2 | Norway |

| 1 May | France | 5–6 | Switzerland |

| 1 May | Norway | 3–4 | Canada |

| 1 May | Czechoslovakia | 2–4 | Russia |

| 3 May | Russia | 8–0 | France |

| 3 May | Switzerland | 3–1 | Norway |

| 3 May | Czechoslovakia | 5–2 | Canada |

| 4 May | France | 0–1 | Norway |

| 4 May | Canada | 4–6 | Russia |

| 4 May | Czechoslovakia | 2–0 | Switzerland |

=== Consolation Round 11–12 Place ===
| 6 May | France | 3–1 | Poland |

Poland was relegated to Group B.

=== Playoff round ===
Quarterfinals
6 May
Russia | 0
Sweden | 2
7 May
Germany | 1
Switzerland | 3
7 May
Czechoslovakia | 8
United States | 1
6 May
Finland | 4
Canada | 3

Semifinals
9 May
Sweden | 4
Switzerland | 1
9 May
Czechoslovakia | 2
Finland (GWS) | 3

Final
10 May
Sweden | 5
Finland | 2
Third place
10 May
Czechoslovakia | 5
Switzerland | 2

=== Quarterfinals ===
| 6 May | Finland | 4–3 | Canada |

| 6 May | Russia | 0–2 | Sweden |

| 7 May | Germany | 1–3 | Switzerland |

| 7 May | Czechoslovakia | 8–1 | United States |

=== Semifinals ===
| 9 May | Czechoslovakia | 2–3 s.o. | Finland |

| 9 May | Sweden | 4–1 | Switzerland |

=== Match for third place ===
| 10 May | Czechoslovakia | 5–2 | Switzerland |

=== Final ===
| 10 May | Sweden | 5–2 (1-0, 3-0, 1-2) | Finland | Prague; Attendance: 14,000 |

Referee:
Muench (Canada)

| Peter Forsberg | 1-0 |
| Mikael Andersson | 2-0 |
| Roger Hansson | 3-0 |
| Lars Karlsson | 4-0 |
| | 4-1 | Timo Peltomaa |
| | 4-2 | Timo Jutila |
| Arto Blomsten | 5-2 |

== Ranking and statistics ==
1992 IIHF World Championship winners

Sweden
6th title

=== Tournament Awards ===
- Best players selected by the directorate:
  - Best Goaltender: (Sweden) Tommy Söderström
  - Best Defenceman: (Czechoslovakia) Róbert Švehla
  - Best Forward: (Sweden) Mats Sundin
- Media All-Star Team:
  - Goaltender: (Finland) Markus Ketterer
  - Defence: (Czechoslovakia) František Musil, (Finland) Timo Jutila
  - Forwards: (Czechoslovakia) Petr Hrbek, (Sweden) Mats Sundin, (Finland) Jarkko Varvio

=== Final standings ===
The final standings of the tournament according to IIHF:

| 1st place, gold medalist(s) | Sweden |
| 2nd place, silver medalist(s) | Finland |
| 3rd place, bronze medalist(s) | Czechoslovakia |
| 4 | Switzerland |
| 5 | Russia |
| 6 | Germany |
| 7 | United States |
| 8 | Canada |
| 9 | Italy |
| 10 | Norway |
| 11 | France |
| 12 | Poland |

=== Scoring leaders ===
List shows the top skaters sorted by points, then goals.

| Player | GP | G | A | Pts | +/− | PIM | POS |
|---|---|---|---|---|---|---|---|
| (Finland) Jarkko Varvio | 8 | 9 | 1 | 10 | +3 | 4 | F |
| (Finland) Mikko Mäkelä | 8 | 2 | 8 | 10 | +11 | 0 | F |
| (Germany) Dieter Hegen | 6 | 7 | 2 | 9 | +3 | 10 | F |
| (Czechoslovakia) Tomáš Jelínek | 8 | 4 | 5 | 9 | +10 | 10 | F |
| (Czechoslovakia) Róbert Švehla | 8 | 4 | 4 | 8 | +12 | 14 | D |
| (Finland) Mika Nieminen | 8 | 3 | 5 | 8 | +5 | 2 | F |
| (Sweden) Mats Sundin | 8 | 2 | 6 | 8 | +5 | 8 | F |
| (Finland) Timo Saarikoski | 8 | 3 | 4 | 7 | +4 | 4 | F |
| (Finland) Rauli Raitanen | 7 | 2 | 5 | 7 | +8 | 2 | F |
| (Finland) Timo Jutila | 8 | 2 | 5 | 7 | +16 | 10 | D |

=== Leading goaltenders ===
Only the top five goaltenders, based on save percentage, who have played 50% of their team's minutes are included in this list.

| Player | MIP | GA | GAA | SVS% | SO |
|---|---|---|---|---|---|
| (Sweden) Tommy Söderström | 300 | 7 | 1.40 | .936 | 2 |
| (Italy) David Delfino | 149 | 7 | 2.82 | .932 | 1 |
| (Finland) Markus Ketterer | 309 | 13 | 2.52 | .927 | 0 |
| (Czechoslovakia) Petr Bříza | 490 | 12 | 1.47 | .921 | 2 |
| (Canada) Ron Hextall | 273 | 13 | 2.86 | .909 | 0 |

== World Championship Group B (Austria) ==
Played in Klagenfurt Austria 2–12 April. The hosts went undefeated to return to Group A for the first time since 1957.

| Pos | Team | Pld | W | D | L | GF | GA | GD | Pts |
|---|---|---|---|---|---|---|---|---|---|
| 13 | Austria | 7 | 7 | 0 | 0 | 73 | 4 | +69 | 14 |
| 14 | Netherlands | 7 | 5 | 1 | 1 | 53 | 16 | +37 | 11 |
| 15 | Japan | 7 | 4 | 0 | 3 | 30 | 24 | +6 | 8 |
| 16 | Denmark | 7 | 4 | 0 | 3 | 23 | 24 | −1 | 8 |
| 17 | Bulgaria | 7 | 3 | 0 | 4 | 14 | 38 | −24 | 6 |
| 18 | Romania | 7 | 1 | 3 | 3 | 13 | 26 | −13 | 5 |
| 19 | China | 7 | 1 | 1 | 5 | 15 | 50 | −35 | 3 |
| 20 | Yugoslavia | 7 | 0 | 1 | 6 | 7 | 46 | −39 | 1 |

Austria was promoted to Group A, while Yugoslavia was relegated to Group C but would not play there until 1995.

| 2 April | Netherlands | 12–2 | China |

| 2 April | Yugoslavia | 3–3 | Romania |

| 2 April | Austria | 18–0 | Bulgaria |

| 2 April | Japan | 4–2 | Denmark |

| 3 April | China | 4–1 | Yugoslavia |

| 3 April | Austria | 9–0 | Romania |

| 4 April | Denmark | 0–8 | Netherlands |

| 4 April | Japan | 2–5 | Bulgaria |

| 5 April | Austria | 16–0 | China |

| 5 April | Japan | 5–1 | Romania |

| 5 April | Yugoslavia | 2–4 | Denmark |

| 6 April | Netherlands | 7–1 | Bulgaria |

| 6 April | China | 3–3 | Romania |

| 7 April | Yugoslavia | 1–4 | Bulgaria |

| 7 April | Austria | 5–1 | Denmark |

| 8 April | Romania | 2–2 | Netherlands |

| 8 April | China | 3–10 | Japan |

| 9 April | Bulgaria | 1–7 | Denmark |

| 9 April | Austria | 3–0 | Japan |

| 9 April | Yugoslavia | 0–11 | Netherlands |

| 10 April | Bulgaria | 3–1 | China |

| 10 April | Romania | 2–4 | Denmark |

| 11 April | Japan | 6–0 | Yugoslavia |

| 11 April | Austria | 8–3 | Netherlands |

| 12 April | Denmark | 5–2 | China |

| 12 April | Netherlands | 10–3 | Japan |

| 12 April | Bulgaria | 0–2 | Romania |

| 12 April | Austria | 14–0 | Yugoslavia |

== World Championship Group C1 (Great Britain) ==
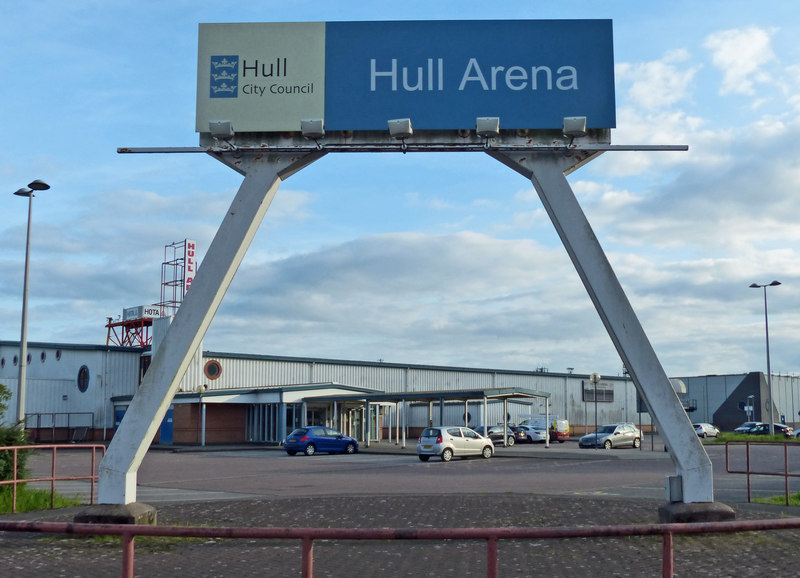
The Humberside Ice Arena in Kingston upon Hull (pictured in 2017)

Played at the Humberside Ice Arena in Kingston upon Hull, Great Britain between 18–24 March. The hosts, led by Scot Tony Hand and Canadian Kevin Conway, won all five games easily.

| Pos | Team | Pld | W | D | L | GF | GA | GD | Pts |
|---|---|---|---|---|---|---|---|---|---|
| 21 | Great Britain | 5 | 5 | 0 | 0 | 62 | 10 | +52 | 10 |
| 22 | North Korea | 5 | 3 | 0 | 2 | 25 | 28 | −3 | 6 |
| 23 | Australia | 5 | 2 | 1 | 2 | 24 | 26 | −2 | 5 |
| 24 | Hungary | 5 | 2 | 0 | 3 | 18 | 33 | −15 | 4 |
| 25 | Belgium | 5 | 2 | 0 | 3 | 17 | 24 | −7 | 4 |
| 26 | South Korea | 5 | 0 | 1 | 4 | 18 | 43 | −25 | 1 |

Great Britain was promoted to Group B while no team was relegated.

| 18 March | Belgium | 5–4 | North Korea |

| 18 March | South Korea | 6–10 | Hungary |

| 18 March | Great Britain | 10–2 | Australia |

| 19 March | Hungary | 3–1 | Belgium |

| 19 March | North Korea | 8–3 | Australia |

| 19 March | Great Britain | 15–0 | South Korea |

| 21 March | Australia | 5–5 | South Korea |

| 21 March | Hungary | 1–4 | North Korea |

| 21 March | Belgium | 3–7 | Great Britain |

| 22 March | Hungary | 1–8 | Australia |

| 22 March | South Korea | 4–6 | Belgium |

| 22 March | North Korea | 2–16 | Great Britain |

| 24 March | North Korea | 7–3 | South Korea |

| 24 March | Australia | 6–2 | Belgium |

| 24 March | Great Britain | 14–3 | Hungary |

== World Championship Group C2 (South Africa) ==
Played in Johannesburg South Africa 21–28 March. Though called 'C2' it was no different from being in 'Group D'. Spain completely dominated, playing against five essentially new hockey nations. Only South Africa had participated before, and they last played in 1966.

| Pos | Team | Pld | W | D | L | GF | GA | GD | Pts |
|---|---|---|---|---|---|---|---|---|---|
| 27 | Spain | 5 | 5 | 0 | 0 | 114 | 5 | +109 | 10 |
| 28 | South Africa | 5 | 4 | 0 | 1 | 55 | 18 | +37 | 8 |
| 29 | Greece | 5 | 3 | 0 | 2 | 36 | 31 | +5 | 6 |
| 30 | Israel | 5 | 1 | 1 | 3 | 22 | 42 | −20 | 3 |
| 31 | Luxembourg | 5 | 1 | 1 | 3 | 20 | 73 | −53 | 3 |
| 32 | Turkey | 5 | 0 | 0 | 5 | 11 | 89 | −78 | 0 |

Spain and later South Africa qualified for 1993 Group C. The others had to play in qualification tournaments in November 1992.

| 21 March | South Africa | 23–0 | Luxembourg |

| 21 March | Turkey | 3–15 | Greece |

| 22 March | Israel | 4–23 | Spain |

| 22 March | South Africa | 18–1 | Turkey |

| 23 March | Luxembourg | 5–9 | Greece |

| 24 March | Israel | 8–2 | Turkey |

| 24 March | Spain | 10–1 | Greece |

| 25 March | South Africa | 5–1 | Israel |

| 25 March | Luxembourg | 0–31 | Spain |

| 26 March | Luxembourg | 10–5 | Turkey |

| 26 March | South Africa | 9–4 | Greece |

| 27 March | Greece | 7–4 | Israel |

| 27 March | Turkey | 0–38 | Spain |

| 28 March | South Africa | 0–12 | Spain |

| 28 March | Israel | 5–5 | Luxembourg |

== See also ==
- World Juniors
- Women's Championships
