= Øystein Olsen (ice hockey) =

Norwegian ice hockey player

Personal information
- Born: 11 January 1969 (age 56); Oslo, Norway

Sport
- Sport: Ice hockey

Øystein Olsen (born 11 January 1969) is a Norwegian former ice hockey player. He was born in Oslo, Norway and played for the club Vålerengens IF. He played for the Norwegian national ice hockey team at the 1992 Winter Olympics.
