= Jon-Magne Karlstad =

Norwegian ice hockey player

Jon-Magne Karlstad (born November 10, 1958, in Oslo, Norway) is a former Norwegian ice hockey player. He played for the club Vålerengens IF. He played for the Norwegian national ice hockey team at the 1984 and 1992 Winter Olympics.
