= Arne Billkvam =

Norwegian ice hockey player

Personal information
- National team: Norway
- Born: Arne Kristian Billkvam; 7 April 1960 (age 66) Oslo, Norway

Sport
- Sport: Ice hockey
- Position: Right wing

Arne Kristian Billkvam (born 7 April 1960) is a former Norwegian ice hockey player. He was born in Oslo, Norway. He played for the Norwegian national ice hockey team at the 1988, 1992 and 1994 Winter Olympics.
