= Jan-Roar Fagerli =

Norwegian ice hockey player

Personal information
- National team: Norway
- Born: September 22, 1966 (age 59) Trondheim, Norway

Sport
- Sport: Ice hockey

Jan-Roar Fagerli (born September 22, 1966) is a former Norwegian ice hockey player. He played for the Norwegian national ice hockey team at the 1992 and 1994 Winter Olympics.
