= Biathlon at the 1994 Winter Olympics – Men's relay =

Men's relay at the XVII Olympic Winter Games
- Venue: Birkebeineren Ski Stadium
- Dates: 26 February 1994
- Competitors: 72 from 18 nations
- Winning time: 1:30:22.1

Medalists
| 1st place, gold medalist(s) | | Ricco Groß; Frank Luck; Mark Kirchner; Sven Fischer | Germany |
| 2nd place, silver medalist(s) | | Valeri Kiriyenko; Vladimir Drachev; Sergei Tarasov; Sergei Tchepikov | Russia |
| 3rd place, bronze medalist(s) | | Thierry Dusserre; Patrice Bailly-Salins; Lionel Laurent; Hervé Flandin | France |

The Men's biathlon relay competition of the Lillehammer 1994 Olympics was held at Birkebeineren Ski Stadium on February 26, 1994. Each national team consisted of four members, with each skiing 7.5 kilometres and shooting twice, once prone and once standing.

== Results ==
| Rank | Bib | Team | Time | Penalties | Deficit |
|---|---|---|---|---|---|
| 1st place, gold medalist(s) | 5 | Germany; Ricco Groß; Frank Luck; Mark Kirchner; Sven Fischer | 1:30:22.1; 22:32.3; 22:06.0; 22:49.5; 22:54.3 | 0 0; 0 0; 0 0; 0 0; 0 0 | — |
| 2nd place, silver medalist(s) | 4 | Russia; Valeri Kiriyenko; Vladimir Drachev; Sergei Tarasov; Sergei Tchepikov | 1:31:23.6; 23:34.6; 23:14.4; 21:54.0; 22:40.6 | 0 2; 0 1; 0 1; 0 0; 0 0 | +1:01.5 |
| 3rd place, bronze medalist(s) | 2 | France; Thierry Dusserre; Patrice Bailly-Salins; Lionel Laurent; Hervé Flandin | 1:32:31.3; 23:22.2; 22:51.6; 23:04.5; 23:13.0 | 1 0; 0 0; 1 0; 0 0; 0 0 | +2:09.2 |
| 4 | 6 | Belarus; Viktor Maigourov; Igor Khokhriakov; Oleg Ryzhenkov; Alexandr Popov | 1:32:57.2; 23:07.9; 23:52.9; 22:05.4; 23:51.0 | 0 0; 0 0; 0 0; 0 0; 0 0 | +2:35.1 |
| 5 | 16 | Finland; Erkki Latvala; Harri Eloranta; Timo Seppälä; Vesa Hietalahti | 1:33:11.9; 24:10.5; 22:18.3; 23:03.1; 23:40.0 | 1 0; 0 0; 0 0; 0 0; 1 0 | +2:49.8 |
| 6 | 1 | Italy; Patrick Favre; Johann Passler; Pieralberto Carrara; Andreas Zingerle | 1:33:17.3; 23:19.0; 23:02.3; 22:16.7; 24:39.3 | 0 5; 0 0; 0 2; 0 0; 0 3 | +2:55.2 |
| 7 | 12 | Norway; Ole Einar Bjørndalen; Ivar Michal Ulekleiv; Halvard Hanevold; Jon Åge Tyldum | 1:33:32.8; 23:50.5; 23:00.2; 23:44.5; 22:57.6 | 0 0; 0 0; 0 0; 0 0; 0 0 | +3:10.7 |
| 8 | 14 | Poland; Tomasz Sikora; Jan Ziemianin; Wiesław Ziemianin; Jan Wojtas | 1:33:49.3; 23:11.6; 23:45.2; 23:39.0; 23:13.5 | 0 0; 0 0; 0 0; 0 0; 0 0 | +3:27.2 |
| 9 | 10 | Austria; Wolfgang Perner; Ludwig Gredler; Franz Schuler; Martin Pfurtscheller | 1:34:02.9; 23:15.2; 23:32.2; 23:01.7; 24:13.8 | 2 2; 0 0; 2 1; 0 1; 0 0 | +3:40.8 |
| 10 | 11 | Slovenia; Uroš Velepec; Jure Velepec; Boštjan Lekan; Janez Ožbolt | 1:34:19.6; 23:37.4; 23:59.8; 23:34.6; 23:07.8 | 0 1; 0 0; 0 1; 0 0; 0 0 | +3:57.5 |
| 11 | 3 | Sweden; Per Brandt; Mikael Löfgren; Leif Andersson; Ulf Johansson | 1:34:38.8; 23:54.6; 23:58.2; 23:43.9; 23:02.1 | 0 0; 0 0; 0 0; 0 0; 0 0 | +4:16.7 |
| 12 | 17 | Czech Republic; Petr Garabík; Tomáš Kos; Ivan Masařík; Jiří Holubec | 1:35:26.0; 24:30.5; 24:11.8; 23:13.1; 23:30.6 | 0 0; 0 0; 0 0; 0 0; 0 0 | +5:03.9 |
| 13 | 8 | Estonia; Olaf Mihelson; Urmas Kaldvee; Aivo Udras; Kalju Ojaste | 1:35:34.3; 24:50.6; 23:03.6; 24:46.6; 22:53.5 | 0 3; 0 0; 0 0; 0 3; 0 0 | +5:12.2 |
| 14 | 18 | United States; Curt Schreiner; David Jarackie; Jon Engen; Duncan Douglas | 1:35:43.7; 23:37.1; 23:58.9; 24:42.8; 23:24.9 | 0 0; 0 0; 0 0; 0 0; 0 0 | +5:21.6 |
| 15 | 7 | Ukraine; Vitaliy Mohylenko; Taras Dolniy; Valentin Dzhima; Roman Zvonkov | 1:35:48.0; 24:28.5; 23:55.1; 23:55.8; 23:28.6 | 1 3; 0 2; 1 0; 0 1; 0 0 | +5:25.9 |
| 16 | 9 | Latvia; Oļegs Maļuhins; Ilmārs Bricis; Aivars Bogdanovs; Gundars Upenieks | 1:37:40.5; 25:36.5; 24:05.0; 24:06.7; 23:52.3 | 3 1; 2 1; 1 0; 0 0; 0 0 | +7:18.4 |
| 17 | 13 | Great Britain; Michael Dixon; Ian Woods; Mark Gee; Kenneth Rudd | 1:39:16.0; 24:17.3; 24:25.6; 26:11.9; 24:21.2 | 0 0; 0 0; 0 0; 0 0; 0 0 | +8:53.9 |
| 18 | 15 | Slovakia; Pavel Sladek; Pavel Kotraba; Daniel Krčmar; Lukaš Krejči | 1:40:00.3; 25:21.1; 24:36.3; 25:07.9; 24:55.0 | 0 3; 0 0; 0 0; 0 1; 0 2 | +9:38.2 |
