= List of 1994 Winter Olympics medal winners =

The 1994 Winter Olympics, officially known by the International Olympic Committee as the XVII Olympic Winter Games, were a multi-sport event held in Lillehammer, Norway, from February 12 through February 27, 1994. A total of 1738 athletes representing 67 National Olympic Committees (NOCs) participated at the Games in 61 events across 12 disciplines.

== Alpine skiing ==
Event	Gold	Silver	Bronze
Men's downhill	Tommy Moe; United States	Kjetil André Aamodt; Norway	Edward Podivinsky; Canada
Women's downhill	Katja Seizinger; Germany	Picabo Street; United States	Isolde Kostner; Italy
Men's Super-G	Markus Wasmeier; Germany	Tommy Moe; United States	Kjetil André Aamodt; Norway
Women's Super-G	Diann Roffe-Steinrotter; United States	Svetlana Gladisheva; Russia	Isolde Kostner; Italy
Men's giant slalom	Markus Wasmeier; Germany	Urs Kälin; Switzerland	Christian Mayer; Austria
Women's giant slalom	Deborah Compagnoni; Italy	Martina Ertl; Germany	Vreni Schneider; Switzerland
Men's slalom	Thomas Stangassinger; Austria	Alberto Tomba; Italy	Jure Košir; Slovenia
Women's slalom	Vreni Schneider; Switzerland	Elfi Eder; Austria	Katja Koren; Slovenia
Men's combined	Lasse Kjus; Norway	Kjetil André Aamodt; Norway	Harald Christian Strand Nilsen; Norway
Women's combined	Pernilla Wiberg; Sweden	Vreni Schneider; Switzerland	Alenka Dovžan; Slovenia

== Biathlon ==
Event	Gold	Silver	Bronze
Men's 10 km	Sergei Tchepikov; Russia	Ricco Groß; Germany	Sergei Tarasov; Russia
Men's 20 km	Sergei Tarasov; Russia	Frank Luck; Germany	Sven Fischer; Germany
Women's 7.5 km	Myriam Bédard; Canada	Svetlana Paramyguina; Belarus	Valentina Tserbe-Nessina; Ukraine
Women's 15 km	Myriam Bédard; Canada	Anne Briand; France	Uschi Disl; Germany
Men's 4 x 7.5 km	Germany; Ricco Groß; Frank Luck; Mark Kirchner; Sven Fischer	Russia; Valeri Kiriyenko; Vladimir Drachev; Sergei Tarasov; Sergei Tchepikov	France; Thierry Dusserre; Patrice Bailly-Salins; Lionel Laurent; Hervé Flandin
Women's 4 x 7.5 km	Russia; Nadezhda Talanova; Natalya Snytina; Luiza Noskova; Anfisa Reztsova	Germany; Uschi Disl; Antje Misersky; Simone Greiner-Petter-Memm; Petra Schaaf	France; Corinne Niogret; Véronique Claudel; Delphyne Heymann; Anne Briand

== Bobsleigh ==
Event	Gold	Silver	Bronze
Two-man	Switzerland; Gustav Weder; Donat Acklin	Switzerland; Reto Götschi; Guido Acklin	Italy; Günther Huber; Stefano Ticci
Four-man	Germany; Harald Czudaj; Karsten Brannasch; Olaf Hampel; Alexander Szelig	Switzerland; Gustav Weder; Donat Acklin; Kurt Meyer; Domenico Semeraro	Germany; Wolfgang Hoppe; Ulf Hielscher; René Hannemann; Carsten Embach

== Cross-country skiing ==
Event	Gold	Silver	Bronze
Men's 10 kilometre classical	Bjørn Dæhlie; Norway	Vladimir Smirnov; Kazakhstan	Marco Albarello; Italy
Men's 15 kilometre freestyle pursuit	Bjørn Dæhlie; Norway	Vladimir Smirnov; Kazakhstan	Silvio Fauner; Italy
Men's 30 kilometre freestyle	Thomas Alsgaard; Norway	Bjørn Dæhlie; Norway	Mika Myllylä; Finland
Men's 50 kilometre classical	Vladimir Smirnov; Kazakhstan	Mika Myllylä; Finland	Sture Sivertsen; Norway
Men's 4 x 10 km relay	Italy; Maurilio de Zolt; Marco Albarello; Giorgio Vanzetta; Silvio Fauner	Norway; Sture Sivertsen; Vegard Ulvang; Thomas Alsgaard; Bjørn Dæhlie	Finland; Mika Myllylä; Harri Kirvesniemi; Jari Räsänen; Jari Isometsä
Women's 5 kilometre classical	Lyubov Yegorova; Russia	Manuela Di Centa; Italy	Marja-Liisa Kirvesniemi; Finland
Women's 10 kilometre freestyle pursuit	Lyubov Yegorova; Russia	Manuela Di Centa; Italy	Stefania Belmondo; Italy
Women's 15 kilometre freestyle	Manuela Di Centa; Italy	Lyubov Yegorova; Russia	Nina Gavrilyuk; Russia
Women's 30 kilometre classical	Manuela Di Centa; Italy	Marit Wold; Norway	Marja-Liisa Kirvesniemi; Finland
Women's 4 x 5 km relay	Russia; Yelena Välbe; Larisa Lazutina; Nina Gavrilyuk; Lyubov Yegorova	Norway; Trude Dybendahl; Inger Helene Nybråten; Elin Nilsen; Anita Moen	Italy; Bice Vanzetta; Manuela Di Centa; Gabriella Paruzzi; Stefania Belmondo

== Figure skating ==
Event	Gold	Silver	Bronze
Ladies' singles	Oksana Baiul; Ukraine	Nancy Kerrigan; United States	Chen Lu; China
Men's singles	Alexei Urmanov; Russia	Elvis Stojko; Canada	Philippe Candeloro; France
Pairs	Russia; Ekaterina Gordeeva; Sergei Grinkov	Russia; Natalia Mishkutenok; Artur Dmitriev	Canada; Isabelle Brasseur; Lloyd Eisler
Ice dance	Russia; Oksana Grishuk; Evgeni Platov	Russia; Maya Usova; Alexander Zhulin	Great Britain; Jayne Torvill; Christopher Dean

== Freestyle skiing ==
Event	Gold	Silver	Bronze
Women's aerials	Lina Cheryazova; Uzbekistan	Marie Lindgren; Sweden	Hilde Synnøve Lid; Norway
Women's moguls	Stine Lise Hattestad; Norway	Elizabeth McIntyre; United States	Yelizaveta Kozhevnikova; Russia
Men's aerials	Andreas Schönbächler; Switzerland	Philippe LaRoche; Canada	Lloyd Langlois; Canada
Men's moguls	Jean-Luc Brassard; Canada	Sergey Shupletsov; Russia	Edgar Grospiron; France

== Ice hockey ==
Event	Gold	Silver	Bronze
Men's team	Sweden; Håkan Algotsson; Charles Berglund; Jonas Bergqvist; Andreas Dackell; Christian Due-Boje; Niklas Eriksson; Peter Forsberg; Roger Hansson; Roger Johansson; Jörgen Jönsson; Kenny Jönsson; Tomas Jonsson; Patrik Juhlin; Patric Kjellberg; Håkan Loob; Mats Näslund; Stefan Örnskog; Leif Rohlin; Daniel Rydmark; Tommy Salo; Fredrik Stillman; Magnus Svensson	Canada; Mark Astley; Adrian Aucoin; David Harlock; Corey Hirsch; Todd Hlushko; Greg Johnson; Fabian Joseph; Paul Kariya; Chris Kontos; Manny Legacé; Ken Lovsin; Derek Mayer; Petr Nedvěd; Dwayne Norris; Greg Parks; Allain Roy; Jean-Yves Roy; Brian Savage; Brad Schlegel; Wally Schreiber; Chris Therien; Todd Warriner; Brad Werenka	Finland; Mika Alatalo; Erik Hämäläinen; Raimo Helminen; Timo Jutila; Sami Kapanen; Esa Keskinen; Marko Kiprusoff; Saku Koivu; Pasi Kuivalainen; Janne Laukkanen; Tero Lehterä; Jere Lehtinen; Mikko Mäkelä; Jarmo Myllys; Mika Nieminen; Janne Ojanen; Marko Palo; Ville Peltonen; Pasi Sormunen; Mika Strömberg; Jukka Tammi; Petri Varis; Hannu Virta

== Luge ==
Event	Gold	Silver	Bronze
Men's singles	Georg Hackl; Germany	Markus Prock; Austria	Armin Zöggeler; Italy
Women's singles	Gerda Weissensteiner; Italy	Susi Erdmann; Germany	Andrea Tagwerker; Austria
Doubles	Italy; Kurt Brugger; Wilfried Huber	Italy; Hansjörg Raffl; Norbert Huber	Germany; Stefan Krauße; Jan Behrendt

== Nordic combined ==
Event	Gold	Silver	Bronze
Individual	Fred Børre Lundberg; Norway	Takanori Kono; Japan	Bjarte Engen Vik; Norway
Team	Japan; Masashi Abe; Takanori Kono; Kenji Ogiwara	Norway; Bjarte Engen Vik; Knut Tore Apeland; Fred Børre Lundberg	Switzerland; Jean-Yves Cuendet; Andreas Schaad; Hippolyt Kempf

== Short track speed skating ==
Event	Gold	Silver	Bronze
Men's 500 metres	Chae Ji-hoon; South Korea	Mirko Vuillermin; Italy	Nicky Gooch; Great Britain
Men's 1000 metres	Kim Ki-hoon; South Korea	Chae Ji-hoon; South Korea	Marc Gagnon; Canada (Note: Derrick Campbell of Canada was obstructed by the Briton Nicky Gooch, who was disqualified. Campbell got up and thought he finished the race, and was celebrating his bronze medal with a Canadian Broadcasting Corporation reporter live on television when he discovered he hadn't completed the race. He had miscounted and left the track one lap short of the finish line, and was classified as a non-finisher. This meant that Marc Gagnon was a surprise bronze medalist, even though he wasn't even in the A final.)
Men's 5000 metre relay	Italy; Maurizio Carnino; Orazio Fagone; Hugo Herrnhof; Mirko Vuillermin	United States; Randy Bartz; John Coyle; Eric Flaim; Andy Gabel	Australia; Steven Bradbury; Kieran Hansen; Andrew Murtha; Richard Nizielski
Women's 500 metres	Cathy Turner; United States	Zhang Yanmei; China	Amy Peterson; United States
Women's 1000 metres	Chun Lee-kyung; South Korea	Nathalie Lambert; Canada	Kim So-hee; South Korea
Women's 3000 metre relay	South Korea; Chun Lee-kyung; Kim So-hee; Kim Yun-mi; Won Hye-kyung	Canada; Christine Boudrias; Isabelle Charest; Sylvie Daigle; Nathalie Lambert	United States; Amy Peterson; Cathy Turner; Nikki Ziegelmeyer; Karen Cashman

== Ski jumping ==
Event	Gold	Silver	Bronze
Normal hill individual	Espen Bredesen; Norway	Lasse Ottesen; Norway	Dieter Thoma; Germany
Large hill individual	Jens Weißflog; Germany	Espen Bredesen; Norway	Andreas Goldberger; Austria
Large hill team	Germany; Hansjörg Jäkle; Christof Duffner; Dieter Thoma; Jens Weißflog	Japan; Jinya Nishikata; Takanobu Okabe; Noriaki Kasai; Masahiko Harada	Austria; Heinz Kuttin; Christian Moser; Stefan Horngacher; Andreas Goldberger

== Speed skating ==
Event	Gold	Silver	Bronze
Men's 500 metres	Aleksandr Golubev; Russia	Sergey Klevchenya; Russia	Manabu Horii; Japan
Men's 1000 metres	Dan Jansen; United States	Igor Zhelezovski; Belarus	Sergey Klevchenya; Russia
Men's 1500 metres	Johann Olav Koss; Norway	Rintje Ritsma; Netherlands	Falko Zandstra; Netherlands
Men's 5000 metres	Johann Olav Koss; Norway	Kjell Storelid; Norway	Rintje Ritsma; Netherlands
Men's 10000 metres	Johann Olav Koss; Norway	Kjell Storelid; Norway	Bart Veldkamp; Netherlands
Women's 500 metres	Bonnie Blair; United States	Susan Auch; Canada	Franziska Schenk; Germany
Women's 1000 metres	Bonnie Blair; United States	Anke Baier; Germany	Ye Qiaobo; China
Women's 1500 metres	Emese Hunyady; Austria	Svetlana Fedotkina; Russia	Gunda Niemann-Stirnemann; Germany
Women's 3000 metres	Svetlana Bazhanova; Russia	Emese Hunyady; Austria	Claudia Pechstein; Germany
Women's 5000 metres	Claudia Pechstein; Germany	Gunda Niemann-Stirnemann; Germany	Hiromi Yamamoto; Japan

== Medal leaders ==
Athletes that won at least two gold medals or at least three total medals are listed below.

Athlete	Nation	Sport	Gold	Silver	Bronze	Total
Manuela Di Centa	Italy	Cross-country skiing	2	2	1	5
Lyubov Yegorova	Russia	Cross-country skiing	3	1	0	4
Bjørn Dæhlie	Norway	Cross-country skiing	2	2	0	4
Johann Olav Koss	Norway	Speed skating	3	0	0	3
Vladimir Smirnov	Kazakhstan	Cross-country skiing	1	2	0	3
Vreni Schneider	Switzerland	Alpine skiing	1	1	1	3
Sergei Tarasov	Russia	Biathlon	1	1	1	3
Kjetil André Aamodt	Norway	Alpine skiing	0	2	1	3
Mika Myllylä	Finland	Cross-country skiing	0	1	2	3
Myriam Bédard	Canada	Biathlon	2	0	0	2
Bonnie Blair	United States	Speed skating	2	0	0	2
Chun Lee-Kyung	South Korea	Short track speed skating	2	0	0	2
Markus Wasmeier	Germany	Alpine skiing	2	0	0	2
Jens Weißflog	Germany	Ski jumping	2	0	0	2

== See also ==
- 1994 Winter Olympics medal table
