= Lillehammer Olympic Bobsleigh and Luge Track =

Bobsleigh, luge, and skeleton track in Lillehammer, Norway

- Interactive map of Lillehammer Olympic Bobsleigh and Luge Track
- Location: Hunderfossen, Lillehammer, Norway
- Coordinates: 61.224291°N 10.427415°E
- Owner: Lillehammer Olympiapark AS
- Operator: Lillehammer Olympiapark
- Surface: Artificial ice
- Field size: 1,710 m (5,610 ft)

Construction
- Groundbreaking: 1991
- Opened: 1 March 1992

Lillehammer Olympic Bobsleigh and Luge Track (Norwegian: Lillehammer Olympiske Bob- og Akebane) is a bobsleigh, luge and skeleton track located at Hunderfossen in Fåberg, Norway, 15 kilometers (9 mi) north of the town center of Lillehammer. It was completed in 1992 for the 1994 Winter Olympics, where it hosted the bobsleigh events and luge events. It has since also hosted the FIBT World Championships 1995 in skeleton and the FIL World Luge Championships 1995, and hosted 2016 Winter Youth Olympics.

Original plans called for the track to be located at Fåberg. Later it was proposed moved to Kanthaugen in the town center and then Holmenkollen in Oslo, before Hunderfossen was decided upon. The track is 1,710 meters (5,610 ft), giving a competition length of 1,365 meters (4,478 ft) for bobsleigh and men's singles luge, and 1,185 meters (3,888 ft) for other luge competitions. The bobsleigh course has a vertical drop of 114 meters (374 ft), giving an 8.5 percent average grade. The track has been part of the proposed Helsinki 2006, Oslo 2018 and Oslo 2022 Winter Olympics bids.

== History ==
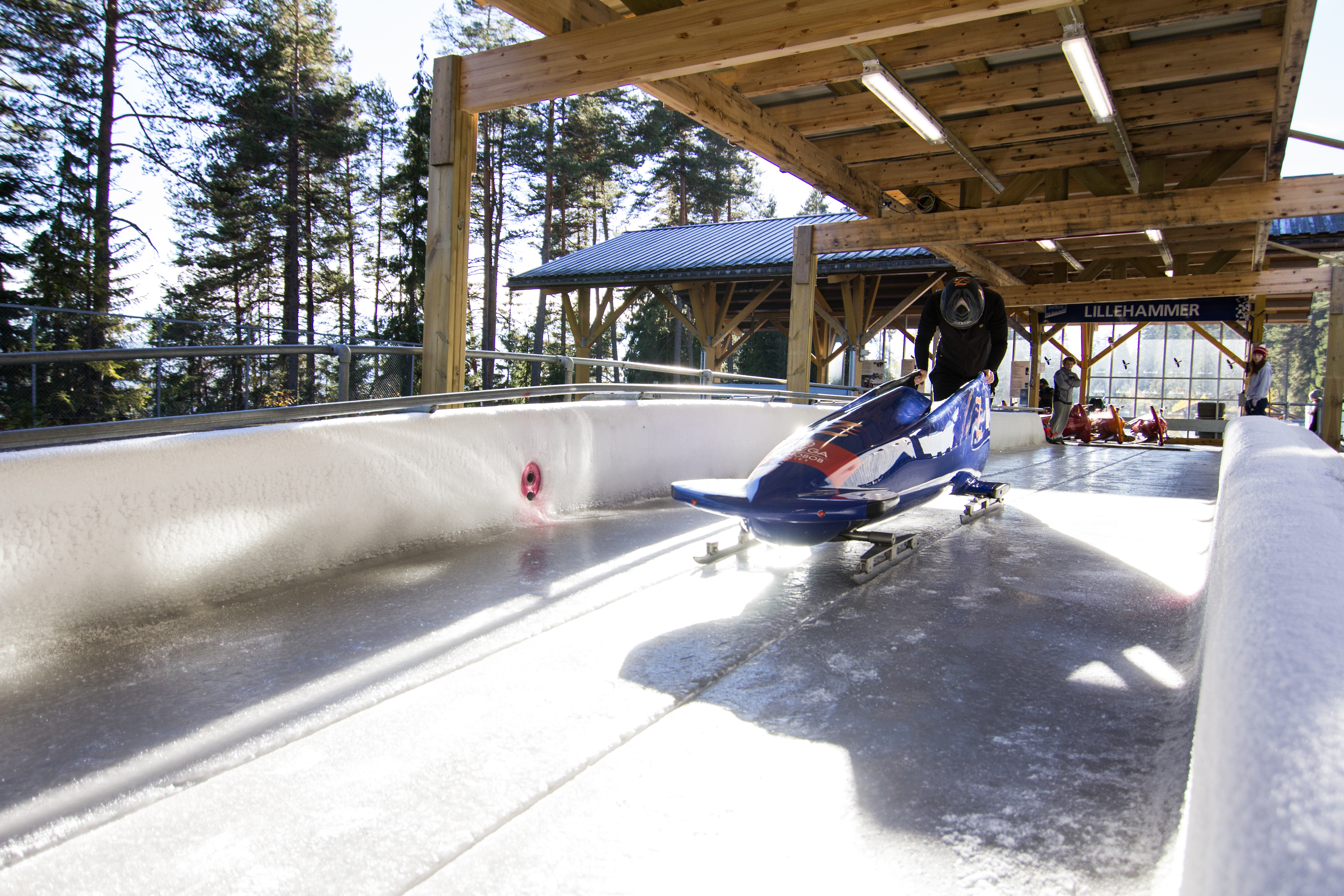
The start of the track

Prior to the Lillehammer Olympics, there was no bobsleigh and luge track in Norway. During the 1952 Winter Olympics in Oslo, Korketrekkeren had been built as a temporary venue, but it was made of snow and was not reused after the Olympics. In its bid for the 1994 Winter Olympics, Lillehammer had proposed placing the bobsleigh and luge track next to Balbergbakken in Fåberg. By May 1989, plans for most of the venues were being reshuffled and the track was then proposed located at Kanthaugen as part of an Olympic Park at Stampesletta. The Kanthaugen proposal was estimated to cost NOK 231 million.

Lillehammer Municipal Council, Oppland County Council and the Norwegian Directorate for Cultural Heritage rejected the location because of the environmental impact. These institutions instead proposed that the track be built at Huseskogen at Hunderfossen. The Lillehammer Olympic Organizing Committee initially disapproved of the location and in 1990 started looking at the possibility of constructing the track at Holmenkollen in Oslo. Two routes were considered, one in the same route as Korketrekkeren and one which would run from Gratishaugen at Holmenkollbakken to Midtstuen. Internationally there was support from the International Bobsleigh & Skeleton Federation and the International Luge Federation to build Norway's track in the capital. Concerns about the environmental impact of a Hunderfossen location were raised, particularly regarding visual pollution. However, Hunderfossen was confirmed along with a grant issued by the Parliament of Norway on 24 August 1990.

The designers of the tracks at Altenberg and Oberhof, East Germany, the Olympic tracks in La Plagne, France, and Calgary, Canada, were consulted during planning. Five companies bid for the concrete construction work, which was awarded to a joint venture between Aker Entreprenør and Veidekke for NOK 45 million. Also the construction of the buildings was awarded to the same group. The track was the first of the Olympic venues for the 1994 games for which construction started. After construction started, Minister of Culture Åse Kleveland (Labour Party) suggested in March 1991, in an attempt to reduce costs, that the 1994 Olympic bobsleigh and luge events be held at La Plagne, the site of the events for the 1992 Winter Olympics in Albertville, France. The French authorities were positive, if Norway paid for part of the construction costs, but the idea was rejected by LOOC-president Gerhard Heiberg. Also fellow party members reacted, by emphasizing that NOK 30 million had already been used on blasting the track route.

Construction was undertaken by spraying 1,300 tonnes (1,300 long tons; 1,400 short tons) of shotcrete intertwined with 180 tonnes (180 long tons; 200 short tons) of reinforcement bars. It is the first track in the world to build the cooling pipes into an underground culvert. It consists of 31 reinforced concrete sections. The concrete work was completed on 31 October 1991. Representatives for the Norwegian Society for the Conservation of Nature stated that they were satisfied with the result. It is the only artificially frozen bobsleigh and luge track in the Nordic Countries. The venue was completed on 1 October 1992 and cost NOK 201 million. After the Olympics, the ownership of the venue was transferred to Lillehammer Olympiapark, owned by Lillehammer Municipality.

== Specifications ==
The track is 1,710 meters (5,610 ft) long, including braking distance. The competitive length—excluding braking distance—for bobsleigh, skeleton and luge men's singles it is 1,365 meters (4,478 ft) long and for luge men's doubles and women's singles it is 1,065 meters (3,494 ft) long. The track has 16 turns and contains 24 photocells for timekeeping. The track has a vertical drop of 112 meters (367 ft) for the entire course, with an average 8 percent and maximum 15 percent grade. The start is located at 384 meters (1,260 ft) above mean sea level. It allows for a maximum speed of 130 kilometres per hour (81 mph). The spectator capacity is 10,000.

The refrigeration system contains 90 metric tons (89 long tons; 99 short tons) of ammonia circulating in 94 sections with a total length of 80 kilometers (50 mi) of pipe. This allows a capacity of 3,100 kilowatts of (10.6 million British thermal units or 880 short tons of refrigeration) cooling, which allows the track to be iced in outdoor temperatures up to 20 °C (68 °F). The facility produces 4.5 gigawatt hours per year of district heating, gaining the nickname "Norway's largest refrigerator".

The venue is operated by Lillehammer Olympiapark, which also operates the four other Olympic venues within Lillehammer, Lysgårdsbakken, Birkebeineren Ski Stadium, Håkons Hall and Kanthaugen Freestyle Arena. The track is staffed with seven employees, in addition to up to 20 more people during large events. The venue both serves local sports clubs and more than 20 nations have sledding sports training in Lillehammer. In addition the track serves up to 10,000 tourists per year; during summer rides are provided on wheeled bobsleighs. The track is operated eleven months per year. As of 2004, the venue received subsidies of between NOK 1.5 to 2.0 million per year.

The following table shows the physical statistics for the track for the various sports. It contains the competition length (start to finish, excluding braking length), the number of turns, the vertical drop and the average grade.

Physical statistics
Sport	Length (m)	Length (ft)	Turns	Drop (m)	Drop (ft)	Grade (%)
Bobsleigh and skeleton	1,365	4,478	16	114	374	8.5
Luge – men's singles	1,365	4,478	16	110	360	8.5
Luge – women's singles / men's doubles	1,065	3,494	13	85	279	6.9

== Events ==
=== Bobsleigh at the 1994 Winter Olympics ===
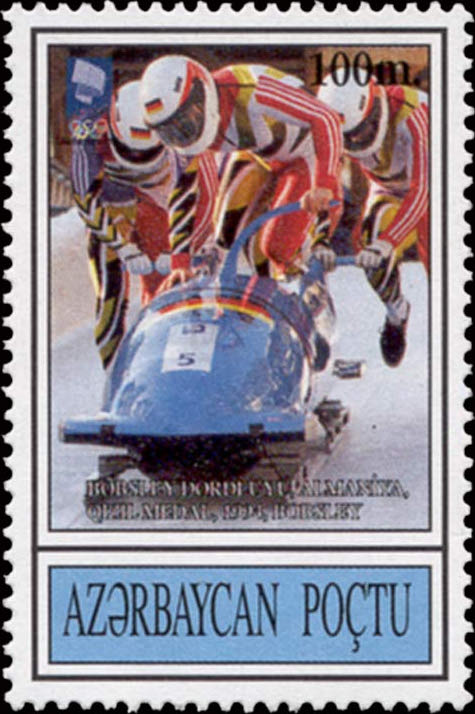
Germany II, winners of the four-man competition at the 1994 Winter Olympics

Both two-man and four-man were competed during the 1994 Winter Olympics. Both were contested in four heats over two days: two-man took place on 19 and 20 February, while four-man took place on 26 and 27 February.

Event	Gold	Silver	Bronze
Two-man	Switzerland; Gustav Weder; Donat Acklin	Switzerland; Reto Götschi; Guido Acklin	Italy; Günther Huber; Stefano Ticci
Four-man	Germany; Harald Czudaj; Karsten Brannasch; Olaf Hampel; Alexander Szelig	Switzerland; Gustav Weder; Donat Acklin; Kurt Meier; Domenico Semeraro	Germany; Wolfgang Hoppe; Ulf Hielscher; René Hannemann; Carsten Embach

=== Luge at the 1994 Winter Olympics ===
Luge was contested in three events at the 1994 Winter Olympics. Singles was contested over four heats in two days, while doubles was contested in two heats on one day. Men's singles took place on 13 and 14 February, women's singles took place on 15 and 16 February, and men's doubles took place on 18 February.

Event	Gold	Silver	Bronze
Men's singles	Georg Hackl; Germany	Markus Prock; Austria	Armin Zöggeler; Italy
Women's singles	Gerda Weissensteiner; Italy	Susi Erdmann; Germany	Andrea Tagwerker; Austria
Men's doubles	Italy; Kurt Brugger; Wilfried Huber	Italy; Hansjörg Raffl; Norbert Huber	Germany; Stefan Krauße; Jan Behrendt

=== FIBT World Championships 1995 ===
The FIBT World Championships 1995 was split between Altenburg and Lillehammer, with bobsleigh taking place in Altenburg and skeleton in Lillehammer. The skeleton events took place on 4 and 5 March.

Event	Gold	Silver	Bronze
Men's singles	Jürg Wenger (SUI)	Christian Auer (AUT)	Ryan Davenport (CAN)

=== FIL World Luge Championships 1995 ===
The FIL World Luge Championships 1995 was competed between 30 nations in four events. It was the second to take place in Norway, after the inaugural 1955 edition in Oslo.

Event	Gold	Silver	Bronze
Men's singles	Armin Zöggeler (ITA)	Georg Hackl (GER)	Markus Prock (AUT)
Women's singles	Gabriele Kohlisch (GER)	Susi Erdmann (GER)	Gerda Weissensteiner (ITA)
Men's doubles	Germany; Stefan Krauße, Jan Behrendt	(United States) United States; Chris Thorpe, Gordy Sheer	(Italy) Italy; Kurt Brugger, Wilfried Huber
Mixed team	Germany	Italy	Austria

=== Future ===
Lillehammer is scheduled to host the 2016 Winter Youth Olympics, which is scheduled to take place between 12 February and 21 February. Lillehammer Olympic Bobsleigh and Luge Track is scheduled to host the bobsleigh, luge and skeleton events.

Three Norwegian cities, Tromsø, Oslo and Trondheim, announced intentions to bid for the 2018 Winter Olympics. Oslo planned a joint bid with Lillehammer and planned to use the sliding center along with the Alpine skiing hills of Hafjell and Kvitfjell in their bid. Tromsø originally planned to build their own track, but later in the bidding process also Tromsø announced that they intended to bid using the Lillehammer track, despite a distance of 1,500 kilometers (930 mi) between Tromsø and Lillehammer. This was after the International Olympic Committee signaled that they wanted more moderation in venue construction costs and that they would prefer bid which used existing venues, even if it increased distances. This was backed by the International Luge Federation and the International Bobsleigh & Skeleton Federation, who both did not want additional tracks built in the world because of the difficulties funding their operation. The 2018 proposals were shelved, but a renewed Oslo bid process for the 2022 Olympics also calls for the use of Lillehammer.

== Track records ==
The following is an incomplete list of track records; while including luge and women's skeleton, it excludes bobsleigh and men's skeleton. The list contains both start times and track times, as well, as the athlete and their nationality, and the date of the record.

Track records
Sport	Record	Athlete(s)	Nation	Date	Time	Ref
Luge – men's singles	Start	Johannes Ludwig	Germany	13 December 2009	4.366	
Luge – men's singles	Track	Dominik Fischnaller	Italy	17 November 2013	49.172	
Luge – women's singles	Start	Tatjana Hüfner	Germany	13 December 2009	2.324	
Luge – women's singles	Track	Gabriele Kohlisch	Germany	4 February 1995	47.883	
Luge – men's doubles	Start	Tobias Wendl, Tobias Arlt	Germany	12 December 2009	2.273	
Luge – men's doubles	Track	Tobias Wendl, Tobias Arlt	Germany	16 November 2013	47.655	
Skeleton – women's	Start	Donna Creighton	United Kingdom	8 December 2011	5.15	
Skeleton – women's	Track	Eleanor Furneaux	United Kingdom	11 November 2017	53.90	
Skeleton - men´s	Track	Lukas Nydegger	Germany	12 January 2024	51.30	
