= Bobsleigh at the 1994 Winter Olympics =

Bobsleigh at the XVII Olympic Winter Games
- Venue: Lillehammer Olympic Bobsleigh and Luge Track
- Dates: February 19–27, 1994
- Competitors: 155 from 30 nations

The bobsleigh competitions of the Lillehammer 1994 Olympics were held at the Lillehammer Olympic Bobsleigh and Luge Track between 19 and 27 February 1994.

== Medal summary ==
=== Medal table ===
Rank	Nation	Gold	Silver	Bronze	Total
1	Switzerland	1	2	0	3
2	Germany	1	0	1	2
3	Italy	0	0	1	1
Totals (3 entries)		2	2	2	6

=== Events ===
Two bobsleigh events were held at Lillehammer 1994 Olympics:

Event	Gold		Silver		Bronze	
Two-man	Switzerland; Gustav Weder; Donat Acklin	3:30.81	Switzerland; Reto Götschi; Guido Acklin	3:30.86	Italy; Günther Huber; Stefano Ticci	3:31.01
Four-man	Germany; Harald Czudaj; Karsten Brannasch; Olaf Hampel; Alexander Szelig	3:27.78	Switzerland; Gustav Weder; Donat Acklin; Kurt Meier; Domenico Semeraro	3:27.84	Germany; Wolfgang Hoppe; Ulf Hielscher; René Hannemann; Carsten Embach	3:28.01

== Participating NOCs ==
Thirty nations sent bobleists to compete in the events.

- American Samoa
- Armenia
- Australia
- Austria
- Bosnia and Herzegovina
- Bulgaria
- Canada
- Chinese Taipei
- Czech Republic
- France
- Germany
- Great Britain
- Greece
- Hungary
- Italy
- Jamaica
- Japan
- Latvia
- Monaco
- Netherlands
- Puerto Rico
- Romania
- Russia
- San Marino
- Sweden
- Switzerland
- Trinidad and Tobago
- Ukraine
- United States
- Virgin Islands
