= Bobsleigh at the 1994 Winter Olympics – Four-man =

Four-man at the XVII Olympic Winter Games
- Venue: Lillehammer Olympic Bobsleigh and Luge Track
- Dates: 26–27 February 1994
- Competitors: 88 from 12 nations
- Winning time: 3:27.78

Medalists
1st place, gold medalist(s)		Harald Czudaj; Karsten Brannasch; Olaf Hampel; Alexander Szelig	Germany
2nd place, silver medalist(s)		Gustav Weder; Donat Acklin; Kurt Meier; Domenico Semeraro	Switzerland
3rd place, bronze medalist(s)		Wolfgang Hoppe; Ulf Hielscher; René Hannemann; Carsten Embach	Germany

Four-man bobsleigh at the 1994 Winter Olympics took place on 26 and 27 February 1994 at Lillehammer Olympic Bobsleigh and Luge Track.

== Results ==
Rank	Bib	Country	Athletes	Run 1	Run 2	Run 3	Run 4	Total	Behind
1st place, gold medalist(s)	5	Germany (GER-2)	Harald Czudaj; Karsten Brannasch; Olaf Hampel; Alexander Szelig	51.67	51.88	52.07	52.16	3:27.78	–
2nd place, silver medalist(s)	9	Switzerland (SUI-1)	Gustav Weder; Donat Acklin; Kurt Meier; Domenico Semeraro	51.80	51.87	52.04	52.13	3:27.84	+0.06
3rd place, bronze medalist(s)	7	Germany (GER-1)	Wolfgang Hoppe; Ulf Hielscher; René Hannemann; Carsten Embach	51.82	51.91	52.14	52.14	3:28.01	+0.23
4	3	Austria (AUT-1)	Hubert Schösser; Gerhard Redl; Harald Winkler; Gerhard Haidacher	51.76	52.04	52.23	52.37	3:28.40	+0.62
5	10	Great Britain (GBR-1)	Mark Tout; George Farrell; Jason Wing; Lenox Paul	52.03	52.24	52.14	52.46	3:28.87	+1.09
6	8	Austria (AUT-2)	Kurt Einberger; Thomas Bachler; Carsten Nentwig; Martin Schützenauer	51.94	52.22	52.32	52.43	3:28.91	+1.13
7	4	Switzerland (SUI-2)	Christian Meili; René Schmidheiny; Gerold Löffler; Christian Reich	51.98	52.16	52.58	52.61	3:29.33	+1.55
8	15	Great Britain (GBR-2)	Sean Olsson; John Herbert; Dean Ward; Paul Field	52.23	52.45	52.26	52.47	3:29.41	+1.63
9	2	Italy (ITA-2)	Gunther Huber; Antonio Tartaglia; Bernhard Mair; Mirco Ruggiero	51.78	52.29	52.60	52.75	3:29.42	+1.64
10	13	Czech Republic	Jiri Dzmura; Pavel Puskar; Pavel Polomsky; Jan Kobian	52.35	52.45	52.31	52.40	3:29.51	1.73
11	6	Canada (CAN-2)	Christopher Lori; Christian Farstad; Sheridon Baptiste; Glenroy Gilbert	52.11	52.32	52.57	52.56	3:29.56	1.78
12	11	Canada (CAN-1)	Pierre Lueders; David MacEachern; Jacek Remigjusz Pyc; Pascal Caron	52.22	52.51	52.31	52.53	3:29.57	1.79
13	17	Latvia (LAT-1)	Zintis Ekmanis; Boriss Artemjevs; Aldis Intlers; Didzis Skuška	52.49	52.27	52.55	52.50	3:29.81	2.03
14	23	Jamaica	Dudley Stokes; Winston Watt; Nelson Stokes; Wayne Thomas	52.50	52.56	52.39	52.51	3:29.96	2.18
15	1	United States (USA-1)	Randy Will; Jeffrey Woodard; Joseph Sawyer; Chris Coleman	52.03	52.42	52.77	52.75	3:29.97	2.19
16	19	France (FRA-2)	Bruno Mingeon; Philippe Tanchon; Gabriel Fourmigué; Eric Le Chanony	52.43	52.49	52.54	52.58	3:30.04	+2.26
17	20	Sweden	Fredrik Gustafsson; Jörgen Kruse; Lennart Westermark; Hans Byberg	52.53	52.49	52.58	52.72	3:30.32	+2.54
18	22	Japan	Naomi Takewaki; Hiroyuki Oshima; Hiroshi Suzuki; Takashi Ohori	52.56	52.83	52.55	52.73	3:30.32	+2.54
19	21	Latvia (LAT-2)	Sandis Prusis; Juris Tone; Otomars Rihters; Adris Pluksna	52.67	52.66	52.69	52.79	3:30.81	+3.03
20	16	Australia	Justin McDonald; Adam Barclay; Scott Walker; Glenn Carroll	52.48	52.67	52.85	53.02	3:31.02	+3.24
21	24	France (FRA-1)	Christophe Flacher; Thierry Tribondeau; Claude Dasse; Max Robert	52.54	52.61	52.89	53.14	3:31.18	+3.40
22	12	Italy (ITA-1)	Pasquale Gesuito; Paolo Canedi; Silvio Calcagno; Marcantonio Stiffi	52.87	52.78	52.97	53.33	3:31.95	+4.17
23	28	Romania	Florian Enache; Marian Chițescu; Iulian Păcioianu; Mihai Dumitrascu	52.92	53.02	53.19	53.05	3:32.18	+4.40
24	30	Russia	Oleg Sukhoruchenko; Aydar Teregulov; Sergey Kruglov; Oleg Petrov	53.15	53.20	53.44	53.39	3:33.18	+5.40
25	25	Puerto Rico	Liston Bochette; José Ferrer; Jorge Bonnet; Douglas Rosado	53.52	53.50	53.57	53.43	3:34.02	+6.24
26	18	Monaco	Albert Grimaldi; David Tomatis; Pascal Camia; Gilbert Bessi	53.54	53.58	53.75	53.75	3:34.62	+6.84
27	26	Ukraine	Aleksey Zhukov; Andriy Petukhov; Vasyl Lantukh; Oleksandar Bortiuk	53.61	53.75	53.99	53.97	3:35.32	+7.54
28	27	Virgin Islands	Zachary Zoller; Paul Zar; David Entwistle; Alexander Poe	53.79	53.82	54.23	53.81	3:35.65	+7.87
29	29	Bosnia and Herzegovina	Zoran Sokolović; Izet Haračić; Nizar Zaćiragić; Igor Boras	54.77	54.80	55.10	55.10	3:39.77	+11.99
	14	United States (USA-2)	Brian Shimer; Bryan Leturgez; Karlos Kirby; Randy Jones	52.25	52.29	DSQ			
