= Germany at the 1994 Winter Olympics =

- IOC code: GER
- NOC: German Olympic Sports Confederation
- Website: www.dosb.de (in German, English, and French)

in Lillehammer
- Competitors: 112 (79 men, 33 women) in 11 sports
- Flag bearer: Mark Kirchner (biathlon)
- Medals Ranked 3rd: Gold 9 Silver 7 Bronze 8 Total 24

Winter Olympics appearances (overview)
- 1928; 1932; 1936; 1948; 1952; 1956–1988; 1992; 1994; 1998; 2002; 2006; 2010; 2014; 2018; 2022; 2026

Other related appearances
- United Team of Germany (1956–1964); East Germany (1968–1988); West Germany (1968–1988)

Germany competed at the 1994 Winter Olympics. 112 athletes, 79 men and 33 women participated in 11 sports. Germany came third in the medal rankings with 9 gold, 7 silver and 8 bronze medals. The biathlete Mark Kirchner was Germany's flagbearer at the opening ceremony.

== Medalists ==
| Medal | Name | Sport | Event | Date |
|---|---|---|---|---|
| Gold | Georg Hackl | Luge | Men's singles | 14 February |
| Gold | Ricco Groß; Frank Luck; Mark Kirchner; Sven Fischer | Biathlon | Men's relay | 15 February |
| Gold | Markus Wasmeier | Alpine skiing | Men's super-G | 17 February |
| Gold | Katja Seizinger | Alpine skiing | Women's downhill | 19 February |
| Gold | Jens Weißflog | Ski jumping | Large hill individual | 20 February |
| Gold | Jens Weißflog; Dieter Thoma; Hansjörg Jäkle; Christof Duffner | Ski jumping | Large hill team | 22 February |
| Gold | Markus Wasmeier | Alpine skiing | Men's giant slalom | 23 February |
| Gold | Claudia Pechstein | Speed skating | Women's 5000 metres | 25 February |
| Gold | Harald Czudaj; Karsten Brannasch; Olaf Hampel; Alexander Szelig | Bobsleigh | Four-man | 27 February |
| Silver | Susi Erdmann | Luge | Women's singles | 16 February |
| Silver | Frank Luck | Biathlon | Men's individual | 20 February |
| Silver | Ricco Groß | Biathlon | Men's sprint | 23 February |
| Silver | Anke Baier | Speed skating | Women's 1000 metres | 23 February |
| Silver | Martina Ertl | Alpine skiing | Women's giant slalom | 24 February |
| Silver | Uschi Disl; Antje Harvey; Simone Greiner-Petter-Memm; Petra Schaaf | Biathlon | Women's relay | 25 February |
| Silver | Gunda Niemann | Speed skating | Women's 5000 metres | 25 February |
| Bronze | Claudia Pechstein | Speed skating | Women's 3000 metres | 17 February |
| Bronze | Uschi Disl | Biathlon | Women's individual | 18 February |
| Bronze | Stefan Krauße; Jan Behrendt | Luge | Doubles | 18 February |
| Bronze | Franziska Schenk | Speed skating | Women's 500 metres | 19 February |
| Bronze | Sven Fischer | Biathlon | Men's individual | 20 February |
| Bronze | Gunda Niemann | Speed skating | Women's 1500 metres | 21 February |
| Bronze | Dieter Thoma | Ski jumping | Normal hill individual | 25 February |
| Bronze | Wolfgang Hoppe; Ulf Hielscher; René Hannemann; Carsten Embach | Bobsleigh | Four-man | 27 February |

== Competitors ==
The following is the list of number of competitors in the Games.

| Sport | Men | Women | Total |
|---|---|---|---|
| Alpine skiing | 6 | 8 | 14 |
| Biathlon | 5 | 4 | 9 |
| Bobsleigh | 12 | – | 12 |
| Cross-country skiing | 5 | 0 | 5 |
| Figure skating | 4 | 6 | 10 |
| Freestyle skiing | 1 | 4 | 5 |
| Ice hockey | 23 | – | 23 |
| Luge | 7 | 3 | 10 |
| Nordic combined | 4 | – | 4 |
| Ski jumping | 5 | – | 5 |
| Speed skating | 7 | 8 | 15 |
| Total | 79 | 33 | 112 |

== Alpine skiing ==
Men

| Athlete | Event | Final | | | | |
| Athlete | Event | Run 1 | Run 2 | Run 3 | Total | Rank |
|---|---|---|---|---|---|---|
| Tobias Barnerssoi | Super-G | | | | DNF | |
| Tobias Barnerssoi | Giant slalom | 1:29.96 | 1:24.53 | | 2:54.49 | 15 |
| Tobias Barnerssoi | Combined | 1:40.56 | 52.23 | 49.70 | 3:22.49 | 14 |
| Bernhard Bauer | Slalom | DNF | | | DNF | |
| Armin Bittner | Slalom | DNF | | | DNF | |
| Peter Roth | Slalom | 1:01.84 | DNF | | DNF | |
| Hansjörg Tauscher | Downhill | | | | 1:47.30 | 25 |
| Hansjörg Tauscher | Super-G | | | | 1:34.71 | 21 |
| Markus Wasmeier | Downhill | | | | 1:48.53 | 36 |
| Markus Wasmeier | Super-G | | | | 1:32.53 | Gold medal |
| Markus Wasmeier | Giant slalom | 1:28.71 | 1:23.75 | | 2:52.46 | Gold medal |
| Markus Wasmeier | Combined | 1:39.04 | DNS | | DNF | |

Women

| Athlete | Event | Final | | | | |
| Athlete | Event | Run 1 | Run 2 | Run 3 | Total | Rank |
|---|---|---|---|---|---|---|
| Martina Ertl | Downhill | | | | 1:37.10 | 4 |
| Martina Ertl | Giant slalom | 1:21.34 | 1:10.85 | | 2:32.19 | Silver medal |
| Martina Ertl | Slalom | 1:01.23 | 58.42 | | 1:59.65 | 14 |
| Martina Ertl | Combined | 1:29.38 | 50.98 | 48.42 | 3:08.78 | 5 |
| Hilde Gerg | Super-G | | | | 1:23.63 | 18 |
| Hilde Gerg | Giant slalom | 1:21.00 | DNF | | DNF | |
| Hilde Gerg | Slalom | 1:02.48 | DNF | | DNF | |
| Hilde Gerg | Combined | 1:29.02 | 52.14 | 48.94 | 3:10.10 | 8 |
| Michaela Gerg-Leitner | Super-G | | | | 1:25.19 | 31 |
| Katrin Gutensohn | Downhill | | | | 1:38.14 | 18 |
| Katrin Gutensohn | Super-G | | | | 1:22.84 | 6 |
| Christina Meier-Höck | Giant slalom | 1:22.02 | 1:13.20 | | 2:35.22 | 11 |
| Edda Mutter | Slalom | DNF | | | DNF | |
| Katja Seizinger | Downhill | | | | 1:35.93 | Gold medal |
| Katja Seizinger | Super-G | | | | DNF | |
| Katja Seizinger | Giant slalom | 1:21.62 | DNF | | DNF | |
| Katja Seizinger | Combined | 1:27.28 | DNF | | DNF | |
| Miriam Vogt | Downhill | | | | 1:37.86 | 12 |
| Miriam Vogt | Slalom | DNF | | | DNF | |
| Miriam Vogt | Combined | 1:29.61 | 51.24 | 49.29 | 3:10.14 | 9 |

== Biathlon ==
Men

| Athlete | Event | Final | | |
| Athlete | Event | Time | Pen. | Rank |
|---|---|---|---|---|
| Sven Fischer | 10 km sprint | 29:16.0 | 1 | 7 |
| Sven Fischer | 20 km individual | 57:41.9 | 2 | Bronze medal |
| Ricco Groß | 10 km sprint | 28:13.0 | 0 | Silver medal |
| Mark Kirchner | 10 km sprint | 29:51.7 | 2 | 12 |
| Mark Kirchner | 20 km individual | 59:16.4 | 4 | 7 |
| Frank Luck | 10 km sprint | 29:09.7 | 2 | 6 |
| Frank Luck | 20 km individual | 57:28.7 | 3 | Silver medal |
| Jens Steinigen | 20 km individual | 58:18.1 | 2 | 5 |
| Ricco Groß; Frank Luck; Mark Kirchner; Sven Fischer | 4 × 7.5 kilometres relay | 1:30:22.1 | 0 | Gold medal |

Women

| Athlete | Event | Final | | |
| Athlete | Event | Time | Pen. | Rank |
|---|---|---|---|---|
| Petra Schaaf | 7.5 km sprint | 26:33.6 | 2 | 5 |
| Petra Schaaf | 15 km individual | 54:52.9 | 5 | 15 |
| Uschi Disl | 7.5 km sprint | 27:04.1 | 2 | 13 |
| Uschi Disl | 15 km individual | 53:15.3 | 3 | Bronze medal |
| Simone Greiner-Petter-Memm | 7.5 km sprint | 26:46.5 | 3 | 8 |
| Simone Greiner-Petter-Memm | 15 km individual | 58:06.5 | 7 | 36 |
| Antje Harvey | 7.5 km sprint | 27:46.5 | 3 | 26 |
| Antje Harvey | 15 km individual | 54:12.4 | 3 | 9 |
| Uschi Disl; Antje Harvey; Simone Greiner-Petter-Memm; Petra Schaaf | 4× 7.5 km relay | 1:51:16.5 | 6 | Silver medal |

== Bobsleigh ==
| Athlete | Event | Final | | | | | |
| Athlete | Event | Run 1 | Run 2 | Run 3 | Run 4 | Total | Rank |
|---|---|---|---|---|---|---|---|
| Sepp Dostthaler; Bogdan Musioł | Two-man | 53.02 | 53.48 | 53.10 | 53.24 | 3:32.84 | 12 |
| Rudi Lochner; Markus Zimmermann | Two-man | 52.74 | 53.09 | 52.76 | 53.19 | 3:31.78 | 4 |
| Harald Czudaj; Karsten Brannasch; Olaf Hampel; Alexander Szelig | Four-man | 51.67 | 51.88 | 52.07 | 52.16 | 3:27.78 | Gold medal |
| Wolfgang Hoppe; Ulf Hielscher; René Hannemann; Carsten Embach | Four-man | 51.82 | 51.91 | 52.14 | 52.14 | 3:28.01 | Bronze medal |

== Cross-country skiing ==
Men

| Athlete | Event | Final | | | | | |
| Athlete | Event | Start | Rank | Time | Rank | Total | Rank |
|---|---|---|---|---|---|---|---|
| Jochen Behle | 10 km classical | | | | | 25:29.4 | 11 |
| Jochen Behle | 15 km free pursuit | +01:09 | 11 | 38:03.1 | 17 | +3:23.3 | 14 |
| Jochen Behle | 50 km classical | | | | | DNF | |
| Johann Mühlegg | 10 km classical | | | | | 25:50.6 | 17 |
| Johann Mühlegg | 15 km free pursuit | +01:30 | 17 | 36:42.1 | 5 | +2:22.4 | 8 |
| Johann Mühlegg | 30 km free | | | | | 1:15:42.8 | 9 |
| Janko Neuber | 10 km classical | | | | | 27:27.4 | 61 |
| Janko Neuber | 15 km free pursuit | +03:07 | 61 | 38:12.6 | 21 | +5:30.8 | 35 |
| Janko Neuber | 30 km free | | | | | 1:19:57.5 | 33 |
| Janko Neuber | 50 km classical | | | | | DNF | |
| Torald Rein | 10 km classical | | | | | 26:38.7 | 32 |
| Torald Rein | 15 km free pursuit | +02:18 | 32 | 39:24.3 | 41 | +5:53.5 | 38 |
| Peter Schlickenrieder | 30 km free | | | | | 1:20:08.8 | 35 |
| Peter Schlickenrieder | 50 km classical | | | | | 2:25:22.4 | 56 |
| Torald Rein; Jochen Behle; Peter Schlickenrieder; Johann Mühlegg | 4 × 10 km relay | | | | | 1:44:26.7 | 4 |

== Figure skating ==
Women

| Athlete | Final | | | | |
| Athlete | Short program | Rank | Free skating | Total | Rank |
|---|---|---|---|---|---|
| Tanja Szewczenko | 2.5 | 5 | 6.0 | 8.5 | 6 |
| Katarina Witt | 3.0 | 6 | 8.0 | 11.0 | 7 |

Pairs

| Athlete | Final | | | | |
| Athlete | Short program | Rank | Free skating | Total | Rank |
|---|---|---|---|---|---|
| Anuschka Gläser; Axel Rauschenbach | 6.0 | 12 | 13.0 | 19.0 | 13 |
| Peggy Schwarz; Alexander König | 3.5 | 7 | 8.0 | 11.5 | 7 |
| Mandy Wötzel; Ingo Steuer | 4.0 | 8 | DNF | DNF | |

Ice Dancing

| Athlete | Final | | | | | | | | |
| Athlete | Compulsory dance 1 | Rank | Compulsory dance 2 | Rank | Original dance | Rank | Free dance | Total | Rank |
|---|---|---|---|---|---|---|---|---|---|
| Jennifer Goolsbee; Hendryk Schamberger | 1.8 | 9 | 1.8 | 9 | 5.4 | 9 | 9.0 | 18.0 | 9 |

== Freestyle skiing ==
Men

| Athlete | Event | Qualifying | | Final | |
| Athlete | Event | Points | Rank | Points | Rank |
|---|---|---|---|---|---|
| Klaus Weese | Moguls | 22.67 | 23 | did not advance | |

Women

| Athlete | Event | Qualifying | | Final | |
| Athlete | Event | Points | Rank | Points | Rank |
|---|---|---|---|---|---|
| Birgit Keppler | Moguls | 21.39 | 20 | did not advance | |
| Tatjana Mittermayer | Moguls | 23.81 | 7 Q | 24.43 | 6 |
| Sonja Reichart | Aerials | 38.00 | 22 | did not advance | |
| Elfie Simchen | Aerials | 146.70 | 10 Q | 136.46 | 9 |

== Ice hockey ==
=== Men's tournament ===
- Team roster
  - Helmut De Raaf
  - Klaus Merk
  - Josef Heiß
  - Mirko Lüdemann
  - Torsten Kienass
  - Jörg Mayr
  - Alexander Serikow
  - Andreas Niederberger
  - Rick Amann
  - Uli Hiemer
  - Jason Meyer
  - Thomas Brandl
  - Leo Stefan
  - Bernd Truntschka
  - Raimund Hilger
  - Benoît Doucet
  - Wolfgang Kummer
  - Georg Franz
  - Dieter Hegen
  - Stefan Ustorf
  - Michael Rumrich
  - Jan Benda
  - Jörg Handrick
- Head coach: Luděk Bukač and Franz Reindl

Results

| Stage | Opponent | Result | Points | Rank |
|---|---|---|---|---|
| Group stage | Austria | 4-3 | | |
| Group stage | Norway | 2-1 | | |
| Group stage | Czech Republic | 0-1 | | |
| Group stage | Russia | 4-2 | | |
| Group stage | Finland | 1-7 | | |
| Group stage | | 11-14 | 6 | 2 |
| Quarterfinal | Sweden | 0-3 | | |
| Placement round 5–8 | Slovakia | 5-6 | | |
| 7th place match | United States | 4-3 | | 7 |

== Luge ==
Men

| Athlete | Event | Final | | | | | |
| Athlete | Event | Run 1 | Run 2 | Run 3 | Run 4 | Total | Rank |
|---|---|---|---|---|---|---|---|
| Alexander Bau | Singles | 51.020 | 51.078 | 50.885 | 51.430 | 3:24.413 | 15 |
| Georg Hackl | Singles | 50.296 | 50.560 | 50.224 | 50.491 | 3:21.571 | Gold medal |
| Stefan Krauße; Jan Behrendt | Doubles | 48.364 | 48.581 | | | 1:36.945 | Bronze medal |
| Jens Müller | Singles | 50.563 | 50.858 | 50.297 | 50.862 | 3:22.580 | 8 |
| Steffen Skel; Steffen Wöller | Doubles | 49.217 | 49.091 | | | 1:38.308 | 14 |

Women

| Athlete | Event | Final | | | | | |
| Athlete | Event | Run 1 | Run 2 | Run 3 | Run 4 | Total | Rank |
|---|---|---|---|---|---|---|---|
| Jana Bode | Singles | 50.099 | 49.296 | 49.467 | 49.239 | 3:18.101 | 14 |
| Susi Erdmann | Singles | 48.989 | 48.893 | 49.340 | 49.054 | 3:16.276 | Silver medal |
| Gabriele Kohlisch | Singles | 48.988 | 49.323 | 49.301 | 49.585 | 3:17.197 | 6 |

== Nordic combined ==
| Athlete | Event | First round | | Second round | | | Cross-country | | | | |
| Athlete | Event | Points | Rank | Points | Total | Rank | Start | Time | Rank | Total | Rank |
|---|---|---|---|---|---|---|---|---|---|---|---|
| Thomas Abratis | Individual event | 99.0 | 26 | 95.0 | 194.0 | 24 | +05.53 | 40:55.7 | 28 | 46:48.7 | 22 |
| Roland Braun | Individual event | 113.5 | 8 | 95.5 | 209.0 | 12 | +04:13 | 43:17.0 | 48 | 47:30.0 | 35 |
| Thomas Dufter | Individual event | 108.0 | 10 | 89.5 | 197.5 | 21 | +05:30 | 41:18.8 | 32 | 46:48.8 | 23 |
| Falk Schwaar | Individual event | 82.0 | 45 | 86.5 | 168.5 | 44 | +08:43 | 40:53.8 | 26 | 49:36.8 | 42 |
| Roland Braun; Thomas Dufter; Thomas Abratis | Team event | 290.5 | 10 | 304.5 | 595.0 | 8 | +11:32 | 1:26:53.4 | 9 | 1:38:25.4 | 10 |

== Ski jumping ==
| Athlete | Event | First round | | Final | | |
| Athlete | Event | Points | Rank | Points | Total | Rank |
|---|---|---|---|---|---|---|
| Christof Duffner | Large hill | 120.5 | 6 | 92.5 | 213.0 | 11 |
| Christof Duffner | Normal hill | 110.5 | 29 | 119.0 | 229.5 | 18 |
| Hansjörg Jäkle | Large hill | 94.2 | 18 | 75.6 | 169.8 | 24 |
| Gerd Siegmund | Normal hill | 123.5 | 11 | 119.5 | 243.0 | 11 |
| Dieter Thoma | Large hill | 102.0 | 15 | 90.7 | 192.7 | 15 |
| Dieter Thoma | Normal hill | 127.5 | 7 | 133.0 | 260.5 | Bronze medal |
| Jens Weißflog | Large hill | 134.1 | 2 | 140.4 | 274.5 | Gold medal |
| Jens Weißflog | Normal hill | 132.0 | 5 | 128.0 | 260.0 | 4 |
| Jens Weißflog; Dieter Thoma; Hansjörg Jäkle; Christof Duffner | Team large hill | 486.8 | 1 | 483.3 | 970.1 | Gold medal |

== Speed skating ==
Men

| Athlete | Event | Final | |
| Athlete | Event | Time | Rank |
|---|---|---|---|
| Peter Adeberg | 500 metres | 37.35 | 18 |
| Peter Adeberg | 1000 metres | 1:14.15 | 13 |
| Peter Adeberg | 1500 metres | 1:53.50 | 6 |
| Alexander Baumgärtel | 5000 metres | 6:59.64 | 23 |
| Frank Dittrich | 5000 metres | 6:52.27 | 8 |
| Frank Dittrich | 10000 metres | 14:04.33 | 6 |
| Lars Funke | 500 metres | 37.80 | 28 |
| Lars Funke | 1000 metres | 1:15.44 | 28 |
| Thomas Kumm | 1500 metres | 1:55.35 | 19 |
| Thomas Kumm | 5000 metres | 7:02.18 | 29 |
| Michael Spielmann | 500 metres | 38.58 | 39 |
| Michael Spielmann | 1000 metres | 1:15.41 | 27 |
| Michael Spielmann | 1500 metres | 1:55.36 | 20 |
| Olaf Zinke | 5000 metres | 1:54.66 | 13 |

Women

| Athlete | Event | Final | |
| Athlete | Event | Time | Rank |
|---|---|---|---|
| Ulrike Adeberg | 1500 metres | 2:06.40 | 14 |
| Anke Baier | 500 metres | 40.59 | 15 |
| Anke Baier | 1000 metres | 1:20.12 | Silver medal |
| Anke Baier | 1500 metres | 2:05.97 | 11 |
| Monique Garbrecht | 500 metres | 39.95 | 6 |
| Monique Garbrecht | 1000 metres | 1:20.32 | 5 |
| Angela Hauck | 500 metres | 40.38 | 12 |
| Angela Hauck | 1000 metres | 1:20.93 | 12 |
| Gunda Niemann | 1500 metres | 2:03.41 | Bronze medal |
| Gunda Niemann | 3000 metres | DNF | |
| Gunda Niemann | 5000 metres | 7:14.88 | Silver medal |
| Claudia Pechstein | 3000 metres | 4:18.34 | Bronze medal |
| Claudia Pechstein | 5000 metres | 7:14.37 | Gold medal |
| Franziska Schenk | 500 metres | 39.70 | Bronze medal |
| Franziska Schenk | 1000 metres | 1:20.25 | 4 |
| Heike Warnicke | 1500 metres | 2:09.53 | 26 |
| Heike Warnicke | 3000 metres | 4:28.43 | 15 |
