= Ukraine at the 1994 Winter Olympics =

- IOC code: UKR
- NOC: National Olympic Committee of Ukraine
- Website: www.noc-ukr.org (in Ukrainian and English)

in Lillehammer
- Competitors: 37 (20 men, 17 women) in 10 sports
- Flag bearer: Viktor Petrenko (figure skating)
- Medals Ranked 13th: Gold 1 Silver 0 Bronze 1 Total 2

Winter Olympics appearances (overview)
- 1994; 1998; 2002; 2006; 2010; 2014; 2018; 2022; 2026

Other related appearances
- Czechoslovakia (1924–1936); Poland (1924–1936); Romania (1924–1936); Soviet Union (1956–1988); Unified Team (1992)

Ukraine competed in the Winter Olympic Games as an independent nation for the first time at the 1994 Winter Olympics in Lillehammer, Norway. Previously, Ukrainian athletes competed for the Unified Team at the 1992 Winter Olympics.

== Medalists ==
Medal	Name	Sport	Event	Date
Gold	Oksana Baiul	Figure skating	Women's singles	25 February
Bronze	Valentina Tserbe-Nessina	Biathlon	Women's sprint	23 February

== Competitors ==
The following is the list of number of competitors in the Games.

Sport	Men	Women	Total
Alpine skiing	0	2	2
Biathlon	5	5	10
Bobsleigh	4	–	4
Cross-country skiing	0	1	1
Figure skating	4	6	10
Freestyle skiing	1	2	3
Luge	2	1	3
Nordic combined	1	–	1
Ski jumping	1	–	1
Speed skating	2	0	2
Total	20	17	37

=== Returning Olympians ===
- Viktor Petrenko (figure skating) – represented the "Unified Team" in 1992
- Oleksandr Bortiuk (bobsleigh) – represented the "Unified Team" in 1992
- Serhiy But (freestyle skiing) – represented the "Unified Team" in 1992
- Natalia Yakushenko (luge) – represented the "Unified Team" in 1992
- Yuriy Shulha (speed skating) – represented the "Unified Team" in 1992

== Alpine skiing ==
Women

Athlete	Event	Final				
Athlete	Event	Run 1	Run 2	Run 3	Total	Rank
Olha Lohinova	Super-G				1:30.00	40
Olha Lohinova	Downhill				1:43.07	37
Olha Lohinova	Combined	1:33.29	54.26	51.88	3:19.43	18
Olha Lohinova	Giant Slalom	1:26.78	DNS		Did Not Finish	
Olha Lohinova	Slalom	1:03.49	DQ		Did Not Finish	
Khrystyna Podrushna	Downhill				1:46.96	42
Khrystyna Podrushna	Combined	1:35.21	DNF		Did Not Finish	

== Biathlon ==
Men

Event	Athlete	Misses ^{1}	Time	Rank
10 km Sprint	Ivan Maksymov	3	31:52.7	47
10 km Sprint	Valentyn Dzhyma	3	31:31.8	40
10 km Sprint	Taras Dolnyi (Note: the athlete is Ukrainian, not Spanish; therefore Taras and not Toras.)	1	30:16.6	18

Event	Athlete	Time	Misses	Adjusted time ^{2}	Rank
20 km	Vitaliy Mohilenko	58:07.7	3	1'01:07.7	26
20 km	Roman Zvonkov	1'00:06.8	0	1'00:06.8	14
20 km	Taras Dolnyi	56:51.1	3	59:51.1	12

Men's 4 × 7.5 km relay

Athletes	Race		
Athletes	Misses ^{1}	Time	Rank
Vitaliy Mohilenko; Taras Dolnyi; Valentyn Dzhyma; Roman Zvonkov	4	1'35:48.0	15

Women

Event	Athlete	Misses ^{1}	Time	Rank
7.5 km Sprint	Maryna Skolota	3	28:11.3	33
7.5 km Sprint	Olena Zubrilova-Ohurtsova	2	27:06.8	14
7.5 km Sprint	Valentina Tserbe-Nessina	0	26:10.0	3rd place, bronze medalist(s)

Event	Athlete	Time	Misses	Adjusted time ^{2}	Rank
15 km	Olena Petrova	DNF	–	DNF	–
15 km	Nadiya Billova	51:44.3	3	54:44.3	13
15 km	Olena Zubrilova-Ohurtsova	50:40.4	4	54:40.4	12

Women's 4 × 7.5 km relay

Athletes	Race		
Athletes	Misses ^{1}	Time	Rank
Valentina Tserbe-Nessina; Maryna Skolota; Olena Petrova; Olena Zubrilova-Ohurtsova	3	1'54:26.5	5

^{1} A penalty loop of 150 metres had to be skied per missed target.
^{2} One minute added per missed target.

== Bobsleigh ==
Athlete	Event	Final					
Athlete	Event	Run 1	Run 2	Run 3	Run 4	Total	Rank
Oleksiy Zhukov; Oleksandr Bortiuk	Two-man	54.71	54.64	54.78	54.61	3:38.74	32
Oleksiy Zhukov; Andriy Petukhov; Vasyl Lantukh; Oleksandr Bortiuk	Four-man	53.61	53.75	53.99	53.97	3:35.32	27

== Cross-country skiing ==
Women

Event	Athlete	Race	
Event	Athlete	Time	Rank
5 km C	Iryna Taranenko-Terelia	15:46.0	29
10 km pursuit^{2} F	Iryna Taranenko-Terelia	30:38.2	20
15 km F	Iryna Taranenko-Terelia	45:19.1	27
30 km C	Iryna Taranenko-Terelia	1'31:26.5	20

^{2} Starting delay based on 5 km results.
C = Classical style, F = Freestyle

== Figure skating ==
Men

Athlete	SP	FS	TFP	Rank
Viktor Petrenko	9	4	8.5	4

Women

Athlete	SP	FS	TFP	Rank
Lyudmyla Ivanova	19	23	32.5	22
Elena Liashenko	17	19	27.5	19
Oksana Baiul	2	1	2.0	1st place, gold medalist(s)

Pairs

Athletes	SP	FS	TFP	Rank
Olena Bilousivska; Ihor Maliar	18	17	24.5	16

Ice dancing

Athletes	CD1	CD2	OD	FD	TFP	Rank
Svitlana Chernikova; Oleksandr Sosnenko	19	19	19	19	38.0	19
Irina Romanova; Igor Yaroshenko	7	7	7	7	14.0	7

== Freestyle skiing ==
Men

Athlete	Event	Qualifying		Final	
Athlete	Event	Points	Rank	Points	Rank
Serhiy But	Aerials	171.19	16	Did Not Advance	

Women

Athlete	Event	Qualifying		Final	
Athlete	Event	Points	Rank	Points	Rank
Nataliya Shertsneva	Aerials	147.78	9 Q	154.88	5
Inna Paliyenko	Aerials	146.18	11 Q	135.28	11

== Luge ==
Athlete	Event	Final					
Athlete	Event	Run 1	Run 2	Run 3	Run 4	Total	Rank
Natalya Yakuchenko	Women's singles	49.233	49.304	49.413	49.428	3:17.378	8
Igor Urbanski; Andriy Mukhin	Doubles	48.728	48.963			1:37.691	8

== Nordic combined ==
Men's individual

Events:

- normal hill ski jumping
- 15 km cross-country skiing (Start delay, based on ski jumping results.)

Athlete	Event	Ski Jumping		Cross-country time	Total rank
Athlete	Event	Points	Rank	Cross-country time	Total rank
Dmytro Prosvirnin	Individual	208.5	13	45:04.8	16

== Ski jumping ==
Athlete	Event	First Round		Final		
Athlete	Event	Points	Rank	Points	Total	Rank
Vasyl Hrybovych	Large hill	40.8	50	42.3	83.1	52
Vasyl Hrybovych	Normal hill	56.0	58	46.0	102.0	56

== Speed skating ==
Men

Event	Athlete	Race	
Event	Athlete	Time	Rank
500 m	Oleh Kostromitin	37.50	23
1000 m	Oleh Kostromitin	1:15.95	33
1500 m	Yuriy Shulha	1:54.28	10
5000 m	Yuriy Shulha	6:59.32	21

== Sources ==
- Official Olympic Reports
- International Olympic Committee results database
- Olympic Winter Games 1994, full results by sports-reference.com
