= Biathlon at the 1994 Winter Olympics – Men's sprint =

Men's biathlon sprint at the XVII Olympic Winter Games
- Venue: Birkebeineren Ski Stadium
- Dates: 23 February 1994
- Competitors: 68 from 28 nations
- Winning time: 27:16.2

Medalists
1st place, gold medalist(s)		Sergei Tchepikov	Russia
2nd place, silver medalist(s)		Ricco Groß	Germany
3rd place, bronze medalist(s)		Sergei Tarasov	Russia

The men's 10 kilometre sprint biathlon competition at the 1994 Winter Olympics was held on 23 February, at Birkebeineren Ski Stadium. Each miss was penalized by requiring the competitor to race over a 150-metre penalty loop.

== Results ==
Rank	Bib	Name	Country	Time	Penalties	Deficit
1st place, gold medalist(s)	25	Sergei Tchepikov	Russia	28:07.0	0 (0+0)	—
2nd place, silver medalist(s)	11	Ricco Groß	Germany	28:13.0	0 (0+0)	+6.0
3rd place, bronze medalist(s)	55	Sergei Tarasov	Russia	28:27.4	1 (1+0)	+20.4
4	47	Vladimir Drachev	Russia	28:28.9	1 (0+1)	+21.9
5	63	Ludwig Gredler	Austria	29:05.4	2 (0+2)	+58.4
6	53	Frank Luck	Germany	29:09.7	2 (1+1)	+1:02.7
7	37	Sven Fischer	Germany	29:16.0	1 (1+0)	+1:09.0
8	60	Hervé Flandin	France	29:33.8	1 (1+0)	+1:26.8
9	48	Janez Ožbolt	Slovenia	29:35.8	0 (0+0)	+1:28.8
10	62	Alexandr Popov	Belarus	29:38.5	0 (0+0)	+1:31.5
11	27	Patrice Bailly-Salins	France	29:43.1	2 (1+1)	+1:36.1
12	32	Mark Kirchner	Germany	29:51.7	2 (1+1)	+1:44.7
13	57	Johann Passler	Italy	29:53.1	2 (0+2)	+1:46.1
14	21	Ivar Michal Ulekleiv	Norway	29:56.6	1 (0+1)	+1:49.6
15	49	Harri Eloranta	Finland	30:02.1	4 (1+3)	+1:55.1
16	5	Valery Kiriyenko	Russia	30:06.2	3 (1+2)	+1:59.2
17	45	Oleg Ryzhenkov	Belarus	30:11.0	3 (2+1)	+2:04.0
18	38	Toras Dolniy	Ukraine	30:16.6	1 (1+0)	+2:09.6
19	1	Thierry Dusserre	France	30:22.6	2 (1+1)	+2:15.6
20	35	Ulf Johansson	Sweden	30:24.2	3 (2+1)	+2:17.2
21	56	Petr Garabík	Czech Republic	30:31.2	1 (0+1)	+2:24.2
22	24	Wolfgang Perner	Austria	30:31.5	3 (1+2)	+2:24.5
23	44	Pieralberto Carrara	Italy	30:33.1	3 (1+2)	+2:26.1
24	9	Wilfried Pallhuber	Italy	30:35.2	3 (1+2)	+2:28.2
25	54	Jon Åge Tyldum	Norway	30:36.7	2 (1+1)	+2:29.7
26	64	Steve Cyr	Canada	30:41.2	3 (1+2)	+2:34.2
27	41	Jan Ziemianin	Poland	30:44.2	2 (1+1)	+2:37.2
28	2	Ole Einar Bjørndalen	Norway	30:44.6	1 (1+0)	+2:37.6
29	40	Jiří Holubec	Czech Republic	30:45.2	2 (0+2)	+2:38.2
30	46	Franz Schuler	Austria	30:55.2	4 (1+3)	+2:48.2
31	20	Krasimir Videnov	Bulgaria	30:59.3	1 (0+1)	+2:52.3
32	23	Tomasz Sikora	Poland	31:02.6	3 (2+1)	+2:55.6
33	28	János Panyik	Hungary	31:04.3	2 (1+1)	+2:57.3
34	13	Gheorghe Vasile	Romania	31:05.3	2 (1+1)	+2:58.3
35	39	Stéphane Bouthiaux	France	31:07.3	3 (1+2)	+3:00.3
36	31	Uroš Velepec	Slovenia	31:07.5	2 (1+1)	+3:00.5
37	19	Viktor Maigourov	Belarus	31:09.2	3 (2+1)	+3:02.2
38	14	Per Brandt	Sweden	31:27.4	1 (1+0)	+3:20.4
39	34	Hillar Zahkna	Estonia	31:28.7	3 (1+2)	+3:21.7
40	16	Valentyn Dzhima	Ukraine	31:31.8	3 (1+2)	+3:24.8
41	42	Ilmārs Bricis	Latvia	31:36.9	4 (2+2)	+3:29.9
42	43	Misao Kodate	Japan	31:40.2	3 (1+2)	+3:33.2
43	6	Martin Pfurtscheller	Austria	31:47.2	5 (2+3)	+3:40.2
44	15	Andreas Zingerle	Italy	31:50.5	2 (1+1)	+3:43.5
45	10	Igor Khokhryakov	Belarus	31:50.7	4 (1+3)	+3:43.7
46	30	Tomáš Kos	Czech Republic	31:52.0	1 (0+1)	+3:45.0
47	61	Ivan Maksymov	Ukraine	31:52.7	3 (1+2)	+3:45.7
48	65	Dmitry Pantov	Kazakhstan	31:54.2	5 (2+3)	+3:47.2
49	8	Ian Woods	Great Britain	31:58.3	2 (0+2)	+3:51.3
50	67	Aivo Udras	Estonia	32:02.1	4 (2+2)	+3:55.1
51	26	Pavel Kotraba	Slovakia	32:04.0	4 (2+2)	+3:57.0
52	29	Vesa Hietalahti	Finland	32:06.0	5 (2+3)	+3:59.0
53	51	Sylfest Glimsdal	Norway	32:07.4	3 (2+1)	+4:00.4
54	3	Erkki Latvala	Finland	32:08.4	3 (2+1)	+4:01.4
55	58	Gintaras Jasinskas	Lithuania	32:15.4	3 (2+1)	+4:08.4
56	70	Thanasis Tsakiris	Greece	32:21.5	3 (0+3)	+4:14.5
57	4	Daniel Krčmář	Slovakia	32:24.1	4 (1+3)	+4:17.1
58	17	Olaf Mihelson	Estonia	32:30.7	3 (0+3)	+4:23.7
59	12	Jože Poklukar	Slovenia	32:31.7	3 (2+1)	+4:24.7
60	59	Jean-Marc Chabloz	Switzerland	32:35.6	3 (2+1)	+4:28.6
61	68	Krzysztof Topór	Poland	32:37.7	3 (3+0)	+4:30.7
62	52	Glenn Rupertus	Canada	32:47.7	5 (4+1)	+4:40.7
63	36	Daniel Hediger	Switzerland	33:05.6	8 (4+4)	+4:58.6
64	50	Dave Jareckie	United States	33:15.6	4 (2+2)	+5:08.6
65	69	Duncan Douglas	United States	33:29.2	3 (1+2)	+5:22.2
66	33	Aivars Bogdanovs	Latvia	33:52.0	6 (4+2)	+5:45.0
67	22	Kenneth Rudd	Great Britain	34:19.7	4 (3+1)	+6:12.7
68	18	Vasily Gherghy	Moldova	34:48.0	3 (2+1)	+6:41.0
