= Freestyle skiing at the 1994 Winter Olympics – Men's aerials =

Men's aerials at the XVII Olympic Winter Games
- Venue: Kanthaugen Freestyle Arena
- Dates: 21–24 February 1994
- Competitors: 24 from 14 nations
- Winning Score: 234.67

Medalists
1st place, gold medalist(s)		Andreas Schönbächler	Switzerland
2nd place, silver medalist(s)		Philippe LaRoche	Canada
3rd place, bronze medalist(s)		Lloyd Langlois	Canada

The men's aerials event in freestyle skiing at the 1994 Winter Olympics in Lillehammer took place from 21 to 24 February at Kanthaugen Freestyle Arena.

== Results ==
=== Qualification ===
The top 12 advanced to the final.

Rank	Name	Country	Jump 1	Jump 2	Total	Notes
1	Aleksey Parfenkov	Belarus	115.70	112.79	228.49	Q
2	Philippe LaRoche	Canada	105.00	117.65	222.65	Q
3	Lloyd Langlois	Canada	106.80	114.81	221.61	Q
4	Trace Worthington	United States	117.03	104.08	221.11	Q
5	Richard Cobbing	Great Britain	102.03	106.51	208.54	Q
6	Andrew Capicik	Canada	104.28	103.01	207.29	Q
7	Nicolas Fontaine	Canada	97.40	109.24	206.64	Q
8	Jean-Marc Bacquin	France	96.99	106.59	203.58	Q
9	Kris Feddersen	United States	104.50	94.77	199.27	Q
10	Andreas Schönbächler	Switzerland	99.94	96.59	196.53	Q
11	Mats Johansson	Sweden	86.26	106.31	192.57	Q
12	Eric Bergoust	United States	93.89	96.59	190.48	Q
13	Vasily Vorobyov	Belarus	98.61	90.31	188.92	
14	Christian Rijavec	Austria	101.27	84.84	186.11	
15	Tor Skeie	Norway	79.42	93.35	172.77	
16	Serhiy But	Ukraine	81.89	89.30	171.19	
17	Michiel de Ruiter	Netherlands	81.37	87.02	168.39	
18	Alexis Blanc	France	74.11	88.11	162.22	
19	Sergey Brener	Uzbekistan	72.21	87.72	159.93	
20	Hiroshi Machii	Japan	79.62	73.91	153.53	
21	Alessandro Scottà	Italy	76.12	73.22	149.34	
22	Sébastien Foucras	France	55.68	88.11	143.79	
23	Herbert Kolly	Switzerland	59.94	69.16	129.10	
24	Freddy Romano	Italy	61.42	53.79	115.21	

=== Final ===
Rank	Name	Country	Jump 1	Jump 2	Total	Notes
1st place, gold medalist(s)	Andreas Schönbächler	Switzerland	113.19	121.48	234.67	
2nd place, silver medalist(s)	Philippe LaRoche	Canada	110.58	118.05	228.63	
3rd place, bronze medalist(s)	Lloyd Langlois	Canada	111.47	110.97	222.44	
4	Andrew Capicik	Canada	106.71	112.36	219.07	
5	Trace Worthington	United States	102.57	115.62	218.19	
6	Nicolas Fontaine	Canada	98.01	112.80	210.81	
7	Eric Bergoust	United States	98.12	112.36	210.48	
8	Mats Johansson	Sweden	105.26	102.26	207.52	
9	Jean-Marc Bacquin	France	108.33	88.55	196.88	
10	Richard Cobbing	Great Britain	102.22	94.36	196.58	
11	Kris Feddersen	United States	91.58	103.68	195.26	
12	Aleksey Parfenkov	Belarus	91.00	87.48	178.48	
