= Biathlon at the 1994 Winter Olympics – Men's individual =

Men's biathlon individual at the XVII Olympic Winter Games
- Pictogram for biathlon
- Venue: Birkebeineren Ski Stadium
- Dates: 20 February 1994
- Competitors: 70 from 28 nations
- Winning time: 57:25.3

Medalists
1st place, gold medalist(s)		Sergei Tarasov	Russia
2nd place, silver medalist(s)		Frank Luck	Germany
3rd place, bronze medalist(s)		Sven Fischer	Germany

The men's 20 kilometre individual biathlon competition at the 1994 Winter Olympics was held on 20 February, at Birkebeineren Ski Stadium. Each miss resulted in one minute being added to a competitor's skiing time.

== Results ==
Rank	Bib	Name	Country	Ski Time	Penalties	Result	Deficit
1st place, gold medalist(s)	26	Sergei Tarasov	Russia	54:25.3	3 (2+0+1+0)	57:25.3	—
2nd place, silver medalist(s)	69	Frank Luck	Germany	54:28.7	3 (0+2+0+1)	57:28.7	+3.4
3rd place, bronze medalist(s)	27	Sven Fischer	Germany	55:41.9	2 (0+2+0+0)	57:41.9	+16.6
4	32	Alexandr Popov	Belarus	57:53.1	0 (0+0+0+0)	57:53.1	+27.8
5	7	Jens Steinigen	Germany	56:18.1	2 (0+0+2+0)	58:18.1	+52.8
6	70	Andreas Zingerle	Italy	55:54.1	3 (1+1+0+1)	58:54.1	+1:28.8
7	13	Mark Kirchner	Germany	55:16.4	4 (1+1+0+2)	59:16.4	+1:51.1
8	21	Sergei Tchepikov	Russia	54:31.4	5 (1+1+3+0)	59:31.4	+2:06.1
9	40	Sylfest Glimsdal	Norway	56:42.4	3 (2+0+0+1)	59:42.4	+2:17.1
10	43	Alfred Eder	Austria	59:43.9	0 (0+0+0+0)	59:43.9	+2:18.6
11	29	Petr Garabík	Czech Republic	58:48.9	1 (0+1+0+0)	59:48.9	+2:23.6
12	28	Toras Dolniy	Ukraine	56:51.1	3 (0+1+0+2)	59:51.1	+2:25.8
13	61	Patrice Bailly-Salins	France	55:53.5	4 (1+2+0+1)	59:53.5	+2:28.2
14	50	Roman Zvonkov	Ukraine	1:00:06.8	0 (0+0+0+0)	1:00:06.8	+2:41.5
15	38	Pieralberto Carrara	Italy	56:14.2	4 (0+2+0+2)	1:00:14.2	+2:48.9
16	39	Aivo Udras	Estonia	57:14.5	3 (1+0+0+2)	1:00:14.5	+2:49.2
17	55	Jiří Holubec	Czech Republic	59:18.9	1 (0+0+0+1)	1:00:18.9	+2:53.6
18	52	Ludwig Gredler	Austria	55:21.6	5 (1+1+1+2)	1:00:21.6	+2:56.3
19	30	Gundars Upenieks	Latvia	58:26.5	2 (1+0+0+1)	1:00:26.5	+3:01.2
20	16	Wilfried Pallhuber	Italy	55:27.1	5 (2+0+2+1)	1:00:27.1	+3:01.8
21	15	Gheorghe Vasile	Romania	58:33.3	2 (1+1+0+0)	1:00:33.7	+3:08.0
22	4	Patrick Favre	Italy	57:40.3	3 (0+1+1+1)	1:00:40.3	+3:15.0
23	56	Viktor Maigourov	Belarus	56:42.7	4 (1+1+1+1)	1:00:42.7	+3:17.4
24	8	Valeriy Medvedtsev	Russia	57:44.0	3 (1+1+0+1)	1:00:44.0	+3:18.7
25	49	Leif Andersson	Sweden	1:00:03.7	1 (0+1+0+0)	1:01:03.7	+3:38.4
26	19	Vitaliy Mohilenko	Ukraine	58:07.7	3 (1+0+1+1)	1:01:07.7	+3:42.4
27	1	Per Brandt	Sweden	58:09.4	3 (0+1+1+1)	1:01:09.4	+3:44.1
28	14	Vadim Sashurin	Belarus	59:09.8	2 (2+0+0+0)	1:01:09.8	+3:44.5
29	25	Janez Ožbolt	Slovenia	58:19.1	3 (1+0+2+0)	1:01:19.1	+3:53.8
30	37	Harri Eloranta	Finland	55:40.9	6 (1+3+1+1)	1:01:40.9	+4:15.6
31	63	János Panyik	Hungary	57:41.6	4 (1+2+0+1)	1:01:41.6	+4:16.3
32	18	Lionel Laurent	France	58:42.6	3 (0+1+2+0)	1:01:42.6	+4:17.3
33	48	Hanspeter Knobel	Switzerland	1:00:42.8	1 (0+1+0+0)	1:01:42.8	+4:17.5
34	11	Ivan Masařík	Czech Republic	58:46.0	3 (1+1+0+1)	1:01:46.0	+4:20.7
35	59	Valery Kiriyenko	Russia	55:46.3	6 (1+2+2+1)	1:01:46.3	+4:21.0
36	17	Ole Einar Bjørndalen	Norway	57:51.0	4 (1+1+1+1)	1:01:51.0	+4:25.7
37	45	Thanasis Tsakiris	Greece	1:00:51.7	1 (0+0+0+1)	1:01:51.7	+4:26.4
38	22	Jure Velepec	Slovenia	59:58.0	2 (0+1+0+1)	1:01:58.0	+4:32.7
39	33	Jan Ziemianin	Poland	58:00.6	4 (0+2+0+2)	1:02:00.6	+4:35.3
40	58	Oļegs Maļuhins	Latvia	58:02.1	4 (2+0+1+1)	1:02:02.1	+4:36.8
41	23	Timo Seppälä	Finland	59:07.0	3 (1+1+1+0)	1:02:07.0	+4:41.7
42	35	Ulf Johansson	Sweden	58:14.2	4 (0+2+1+1)	1:02:14.2	+4:48.9
43	46	Steve Cyr	Canada	56:20.7	6 (1+1+2+2)	1:02:20.7	+4:55.4
44	31	Hervé Flandin	France	58:25.9	4 (2+1+1+0)	1:02:25.9	+5:00.6
45	42	Jean-Marc Chabloz	Switzerland	58:27.9	4 (0+0+2+2)	1:02:27.9	+5:02.6
46	5	Halvard Hanevold	Norway	58:52.0	4 (1+0+2+1)	1:02:52.0	+5:26.7
47	6	Franck Perrot	France	59:57.0	3 (0+1+0+2)	1:02:57.0	+5:31.7
48	20	Franz Schuler	Austria	56:01.4	7 (2+1+3+1)	1:03:01.4	+5:36.1
49	38	Glenn Rupertus	Canada	58:05.9	5 (0+2+1+2)	1:03:05.9	+5:40.6
50	66	Lukáš Krejči	Slovakia	58:28.0	5 (1+1+1+2)	1:03:28.0	+6:02.7
51	47	Dmitry Pantov	Kazakhstan	57:29.8	6 (1+1+2+2)	1:03:29.8	+6:04.5
52	64	Jon Åge Tyldum	Norway	1:00:31.7	3 (2+0+0+1)	1:03:31.7	+6:06.4
53	3	Yevgeny Redkin	Belarus	57:34.9	6 (2+1+2+1)	1:03:34.9	+6:09.6
54	24	Ian Woods	Great Britain	1:00:44.0	3 (2+0+0+1)	1:03:44.0	+6:18.7
54	51	Mike Dixon	Great Britain	1:02:44.0	1 (0+0+0+1)	1:03:44.0	+6:18.7
56	41	Pavel Sládek	Slovakia	1:00:51.7	3 (0+1+0+2)	1:03:51.7	+6:26.4
57	2	Martin Pfurtscheller	Austria	56:56.3	7 (2+1+1+3)	1:03:56.3	+6:31.0
58	44	Gintaras Jasinskas	Lithuania	58:08.9	6 (2+1+0+3)	1:04:08.9	+6:43.6
59	67	Boštjan Lekan	Slovenia	1:00:12.3	5 (3+2+0+0)	1:05:12.3	+7:47.0
60	68	Krasimir Videnov	Bulgaria	59:21.4	6 (2+1+2+1)	1:05:21.4	+7:56.1
61	57	Urmas Kaldvee	Estonia	58:23.2	7 (1+2+3+1)	1:05:23.2	+7:57.9
62	62	Misao Kodate	Japan	58:34.6	7 (2+2+0+3)	1:05:34.6	+8:09.3
63	60	Wiesław Ziemianin	Poland	59:48.8	6 (2+1+2+1)	1:05:48.8	+8:23.5
64	54	Jon Engen	United States	1:02:39.7	4 (2+2+0+0)	1:06:39.7	+9:14.4
65	34	Curt Schreiner	United States	1:01:41.6	6 (1+1+2+2)	1:07:41.6	+10:16.3
66	12	Glenn Olsson	Sweden	1:00:55.9	7 (2+1+1+3)	1:07:55.9	+10:30.6
67	10	Jan Wojtas	Poland	1:01:10.5	7 (3+2+1+1)	1:08:10.5	+10:45.2
68	53	Vesa Hietalahti	Finland	58:49.1	10 (2+1+5+2)	1:08:49.1	+11:23.8
69	9	Kalju Ojaste	Estonia	1:01:21.4	10 (2+2+5+1)	1:11:21.4	+13:56.1
70	65	Vasily Gherghy	Moldova	1:07:30.4	9 (1+4+1+3)	1:16:30.4	+19:05.1
