= Italy at the 1994 Winter Olympics =

- IOC code: ITA
- NOC: Italian National Olympic Committee
- Website: www.coni.it (in Italian)

in Lillehammer
- Competitors: 104 (78 men, 26 women) in 11 sports
- Flag bearer: Deborah Compagnoni (alpine skiing)
- Medals Ranked 4th: Gold 7 Silver 5 Bronze 8 Total 20

Winter Olympics appearances (overview)
- 1924; 1928; 1932; 1936; 1948; 1952; 1956; 1960; 1964; 1968; 1972; 1976; 1980; 1984; 1988; 1992; 1994; 1998; 2002; 2006; 2010; 2014; 2018; 2022; 2026

Italy competed at the 1994 Winter Olympics in Lillehammer, Norway.

== Medalists ==
Medal	Name	Sport	Event	Date
Gold	Manuela Di Centa	Cross-country skiing	Women's 15 kilometre freestyle	13 February
Gold	Gerda Weissensteiner	Luge	Women's singles	16 February
Gold	Kurt Brugger; Wilfried Huber	Luge	Doubles	18 February
Gold	Maurilio De Zolt; Marco Albarello; Giorgio Vanzetta; Silvio Fauner	Cross-country skiing	Men's 4 × 10 kilometre relay	22 February
Gold	Deborah Compagnoni	Alpine skiing	Women's giant slalom	24 February
Gold	Manuela Di Centa	Cross-country skiing	Women's 30 kilometre classical	24 February
Gold	Maurizio Carnino; Orazio Fagone; Hugo Herrnhof; Mirko Vuillermin	Short track speed skating	Men's 5000 metre relay	26 February
Silver	Manuela Di Centa	Cross-country skiing	Women's 5 kilometre classical	15 February
Silver	Manuela Di Centa	Cross-country skiing	Women's 10 kilometre freestyle pursuit	17 February
Silver	Hansjörg Raffl; Norbert Huber	Luge	Doubles	18 February
Silver	Mirko Vuillermin	Short track speed skating	Men's 500 metres	26 February
Silver	Alberto Tomba	Alpine skiing	Men's slalom	27 February
Bronze	Armin Zöggeler	Luge	Men's singles	14 February
Bronze	Isolde Kostner	Alpine skiing	Women's super-G	15 February
Bronze	Marco Albarello	Cross-country skiing	Men's 10 kilometre classical	17 February
Bronze	Stefania Belmondo	Cross-country skiing	Women's 10 kilometre freestyle pursuit	17 February
Bronze	Isolde Kostner	Alpine skiing	Women's downhill	19 February
Bronze	Silvio Fauner	Cross-country skiing	Men's 15 kilometre freestyle pursuit	19 February
Bronze	Günther Huber; Stefano Ticci	Bobsleigh	Two-man	20 February
Bronze	Bice Vanzetta; Manuela Di Centa; Gabriella Paruzzi; Stefania Belmondo	Cross-country skiing	Women's 4 × 5 kilometre relay	21 February

== Competitors ==
The following is the list of number of competitors in the Games.

Sport	Men	Women	Total
Alpine skiing	12	8	20
Biathlon	5	1	6
Bobsleigh	9	–	9
Cross-country skiing	6	6	12
Freestyle skiing	4	2	6
Ice hockey	23	–	23
Luge	6	2	8
Nordic combined	3	–	3
Short track speed skating	4	5	9
Ski jumping	4	–	4
Speed skating	3	2	5
Total	78	26	104

== Alpine skiing ==
Men

Athlete	Event	Race 1	Race 2	Total	
Athlete	Event	Time	Time	Time	Rank
Luigi Colturi	Downhill			1:47.05	21
Kristian Ghedina	Downhill			1:46.99	20
Pietro Vitalini	Downhill			1:46.48	13
Peter Runggaldier	Downhill			1:46.39	12
Alessandro Fattori	Super-G			DNF	–
Pietro Vitalini	Super-G			1:34.46	16
Peter Runggaldier	Super-G			1:34.44	15
Werner Perathoner	Super-G			1:33.10	5
Gianfranco Martin	Giant Slalom	1:32.28	1:27.56	2:59.84	29
Alberto Tomba	Giant Slalom	1:29.53	DSQ	DSQ	–
Norman Bergamelli	Giant Slalom	1:29.39	1:23.73	2:53.12	6
Gerhard Königsrainer	Giant Slalom	1:29.16	1:24.45	2:53.61	10
Norman Bergamelli	Slalom	DNF	–	DNF	–
Fabrizio Tescari	Slalom	DNF	–	DNF	–
Alberto Tomba	Slalom	1:02.84	59.33	2:02.17	2nd place, silver medalist(s)
Angelo Weiss	Slalom	1:02.77	1:00.95	2:03.72	8

Men's combined

Athlete	Downhill	Slalom		Total	
Athlete	Time	Time 1	Time 2	Total time	Rank
Gianfranco Martin	1:38.84	53.58	50.27	3:22.69	15
Alessandro Fattori	1:38.25	53.77	DNF	DNF	–
Kristian Ghedina	1:38.14	54.28	50.75	3:23.17	16

Women

Athlete	Event	Race 1	Race 2	Total	
Athlete	Event	Time	Time	Time	Rank
Bibiana Perez	Downhill			DNF	–
Barbara Merlin	Downhill			1:38.65	25
Morena Gallizio	Downhill			1:37.94	14
Isolde Kostner	Downhill			1:36.85	3rd place, bronze medalist(s)
Bibiana Perez	Super-G			DNF	–
Deborah Compagnoni	Super-G			1:23.54	17
Morena Gallizio	Super-G			1:22.73	5
Isolde Kostner	Super-G			1:22.45	3rd place, bronze medalist(s)
Morena Gallizio	Giant Slalom	DNF	–	DNF	–
Sabina Panzanini	Giant Slalom	1:22.94	1:13.59	2:36.53	15
Lara Magoni	Giant Slalom	1:21.85	1:12.82	2:34.67	7
Deborah Compagnoni	Giant Slalom	1:20.37	1:10.60	2:30.67	1st place, gold medalist(s)
Lara Magoni	Slalom	1:00.77	59.24	2:00.01	16
Morena Gallizio	Slalom	1:00.43	57.76	1:58.19	9
Roberta Serra	Slalom	1:00.39	57.49	1:57.88	7
Deborah Compagnoni	Slalom	1:00.25	58.01	1:58.26	10

Women's combined

Athlete	Downhill	Slalom		Total	
Athlete	Time	Time 1	Time 2	Total time	Rank
Barbara Merlin	1:29.67	55.79	51.85	3:17.31	16
Bibiana Perez	1:29.15	52.78	48.71	3:10.64	12
Morena Gallizio	1:28.71	49.94	48.06	3:06.71	4
Isolde Kostner	1:28.52	54.04	DNF	DNF	–

== Biathlon ==
Men

Event	Athlete	Misses ^{1}	Time	Rank
10 km Sprint	Andreas Zingerle	2	31:50.5	44
10 km Sprint	Wilfried Pallhuber	3	30:35.2	24
10 km Sprint	Pieralberto Carrara	3	30:33.1	23
10 km Sprint	Johann Passler	2	29:53.1	13

Event	Athlete	Time	Misses	Adjusted time ^{2}	Rank
20 km	Patrick Favre	57:40.3	3	1'00:40.3	22
20 km	Wilfried Pallhuber	55:27.1	5	1'00:27.1	20
20 km	Pieralberto Carrara	56:14.2	4	1'00:14.2	15
20 km	Andreas Zingerle	55:54.1	3	58:54.1	6

Men's 4 × 7.5 km relay

Athletes	Race		
Athletes	Misses ^{1}	Time	Rank
Patrick Favre; Johann Passler; Pieralberto Carrara; Andreas Zingerle	5	1'33:17.3	6

Women

Event	Athlete	Misses ^{1}	Time	Rank
7.5 km Sprint	Nathalie Santer	3	26:38.8	7

Event	Athlete	Time	Misses	Adjusted time ^{2}	Rank
15 km	Nathalie Santer	48:07.4	8	56:07.4	25

^{1} A penalty loop of 150 metres had to be skied per missed target.
^{2} One minute added per missed target.

== Bobsleigh ==
Sled	Athletes	Event	Run 1		Run 2		Run 3		Run 4		Total	
Sled	Athletes	Event	Time	Rank	Time	Rank	Time	Rank	Time	Rank	Time	Rank
ITA-1	Günther Huber; Stefano Ticci	Two-man	52.61	3	52.80	2	52.69	1	52.91	2	3:31.01	3rd place, bronze medalist(s)
ITA-2	Pasquale Gesuito; Antonio Tartaglia	Two-man	52.92	11	53.33	10	52.89	6	53.31	9	3:32.45	9

Sled	Athletes	Event	Run 1		Run 2		Run 3		Run 4		Total	
Sled	Athletes	Event	Time	Rank	Time	Rank	Time	Rank	Time	Rank	Time	Rank
ITA-1	Pasquale Gesuito; Paolo Canedi; Silvio Calcagno; Marcantonio Stiffi	Four-man	52.87	23	52.78	22	52.97	22	53.33	23	3:31.95	22
ITA-2	Günther Huber; Antonio Tartaglia; Bernhard Mair; Mirco Ruggiero	Four-man	51.78	3	52.29	9	52.60	17	52.75	17	3:29.42	9

== Cross-country skiing ==
Men

Event	Athlete	Race	
Event	Athlete	Time	Rank
10 km C	Fulvio Valbusa	26:26.2	29
10 km C	Giorgio Vanzetta	25:48.1	15
10 km C	Silvio Fauner	25:08.1	8
10 km C	Marco Albarello	24:42.3	3rd place, bronze medalist(s)
15 km pursuit^{1} F	Fulvio Valbusa	40:16.3	22
15 km pursuit^{1} F	Marco Albarello	38:14.1	10
15 km pursuit^{1} F	Giorgio Vanzetta	38:11.6	9
15 km pursuit^{1} F	Silvio Fauner	37:28.6	3rd place, bronze medalist(s)
30 km F	Gianfranco Polvara	DSQ	–
30 km F	Giorgio Vanzetta	1'16:35.2	14
30 km F	Silvio Fauner	1'15:27.7	7
30 km F	Maurilio De Zolt	1'14:55.5	5
50 km C	Gianfranco Polvara	2'18:40.3	31
50 km C	Silvio Fauner	2'11:09.6	11
50 km C	Giorgio Vanzetta	2'10:16.4	8
50 km C	Maurilio De Zolt	2'10:12.1	7

^{1} Starting delay based on 10 km results.
C = Classical style, F = Freestyle

Men's 4 × 10 km relay

Athletes	Race	
Athletes	Time	Rank
Maurilio De Zolt; Marco Albarello; Giorgio Vanzetta; Silvio Fauner	1'41:15.0	1st place, gold medalist(s)

Women

Event	Athlete	Race	
Event	Athlete	Time	Rank
5 km C	Gabriella Paruzzi	15:34.7	24
5 km C	Bice Vanzetta	15:21.3	19
5 km C	Stefania Belmondo	15:04.0	13
5 km C	Manuela Di Centa	14:28.3	2nd place, silver medalist(s)
10 km pursuit^{2} F	Bice Vanzetta	32:35.1	34
10 km pursuit^{2} F	Gabriella Paruzzi	30:20.9	18
10 km pursuit^{2} F	Stefania Belmondo	28:13.1	3rd place, bronze medalist(s)
10 km pursuit^{2} F	Manuela Di Centa	27:38.4	2nd place, silver medalist(s)
15 km F	Sabina Valbusa	45:03.9	26
15 km F	Gabriella Paruzzi	43:05.1	12
15 km F	Stefania Belmondo	41:33.6	4
15 km F	Manuela Di Centa	39:44.5	1st place, gold medalist(s)
30 km C	Gabriella Paruzzi	1'33:28.9	30
30 km C	Guidina Dal Sasso	1'30:47.5	17
30 km C	Manuela Di Centa	1'25:41.6	1st place, gold medalist(s)

^{2} Starting delay based on 5 km results.
C = Classical style, F = Freestyle

Women's 4 × 5 km relay

Athletes	Race	
Athletes	Time	Rank
Bice Vanzetta; Manuela Di Centa; Gabriella Paruzzi; Stefania Belmondo	58:42.6	3rd place, bronze medalist(s)

== Freestyle skiing ==
Men

Athlete	Event	Qualification			Final		
Athlete	Event	Time	Points	Rank	Time	Points	Rank
Walter Osta	Moguls	29.12	14.13	29	did not advance		
Simone Mottini	Moguls	25.95	22.87	22	did not advance		
Freddy Romano	Aerials		115.21	23	did not advance		
Alessandro Scottà	Aerials		149.34	21	did not advance		

Women

Athlete	Event	Qualification			Final		
Athlete	Event	Time	Points	Rank	Time	Points	Rank
Petra Moroder	Moguls	31.35	19.83	22	did not advance		
Silvia Marciandi	Moguls	32.64	22.99	12 Q	29.75	23.36	10

== Ice hockey ==
=== Group B ===
Twelve participating teams were placed in the two groups. After playing a round-robin, the top four teams in each group advanced to the Medal Round while the last two teams competed in the consolation round for the 9th to 12th places.

Team advanced to the Final Round
Team sent to compete in the consolation round

Team	GP	W	L	T	GF	GA	PTS
Slovakia	5	3	0	2	26	14	8
Canada	5	3	1	1	17	11	7
Sweden	5	3	1	1	23	13	7
United States	5	1	1	3	21	17	5
Italy	5	1	4	0	15	31	2
France	5	0	4	1	11	27	1

Canada	7:2	Italy
Sweden	4:1	Italy
Slovakia	10:4	Italy
Italy	7:3	France
United States	7:1	Italy

=== Consolation round ===
Team 1	Score	Team 2
Norway	3–6	Italy

9th place match

Team 1	Score	Team 2
Italy	3–2	France

Leading scorer

Rk		GP	G	A	Pts
5	(Italy) Gates Orlando	7	3	6	9

- Team roster
  - Bruno Campese
  - David Delfino
  - Mike Rosati
  - Phil Di Gaetano
  - Robert Oberrauch
  - Leo Insam
  - Jim Camazzola
  - Bill Stewart
  - Anthony Circelli
  - Michael De Angelis
  - Luigi Da Corte
  - Emilio Iovio
  - Lino De Toni
  - Roland Ramoser
  - Maurizio Mansi
  - Bruno Zarrillo
  - Gaetano Orlando
  - Alexander Gschliesser
  - Patrick Brugnoli
  - Lucio Topatigh
  - Martin Pavlu
  - Vezio Sacratini
  - Stephan Figliuzzi
- Head coach: Bryan Lefley

== Luge ==
Men

Athlete	Run 1		Run 2		Run 3		Run 4		Total	
Athlete	Time	Rank	Time	Rank	Time	Rank	Time	Rank	Time	Rank
Norbert Huber	50.659	8	50.836	8	50.399	7	50.580	8	3:22.474	6
Arnold Huber	50.558	4	50.763	5	50.546	8	50.551	6	3:22.418	4
Armin Zöggeler	50.441	3	50.601	3	50.365	6	50.426	1	3:21.833	3rd place, bronze medalist(s)

(Men's) Doubles

Athletes	Run 1		Run 2		Total	
Athletes	Time	Rank	Time	Rank	Time	Rank
Kurt Brugger; Wilfried Huber	48.348	2	48.372	1	1:36.720	1st place, gold medalist(s)
Hansjörg Raffl; Norbert Huber	48.274	1	48.495	2	1:36.769	2nd place, silver medalist(s)

Women

Athlete	Run 1		Run 2		Run 3		Run 4		Total	
Athlete	Time	Rank	Time	Rank	Time	Rank	Time	Rank	Time	Rank
Natalie Obkircher	49.046	5	49.252	6	49.181	2	49.458	11	3:16.937	5
Gerda Weissensteiner	48.740	1	48.890	1	48.950	1	48.937	1	3:15.517	1st place, gold medalist(s)

== Nordic combined ==
Men's individual

Events:

- normal hill ski jumping
- 15 km cross-country skiing (Start delay, based on ski jumping results.)

Athlete	Event	Ski Jumping		Cross-country time	Total rank
Athlete	Event	Points	Rank	Cross-country time	Total rank
Simone Pinzani	Individual	168.0	45	53:26.7	49
Andrea Longo	Individual	169.5	43	50:49.1	44
Andrea Cecon	Individual	192.5	27	47:25.1	33

Men's Team

Three participants per team.

Events:

- normal hill ski jumping
- 10 km cross-country skiing (Start delay, based on ski jumping results.)

Athletes	Ski jumping		Cross-country time	Total rank
Athletes	Points	Rank	Cross-country time	Total rank
Andrea Cecon; Andrea Longo; Simone Pinzani	544.5	11	1'45:12.1	11

== Short track speed skating ==
Men

Athlete	Event	Round one		Quarter finals		Semi finals		Finals	
Athlete	Event	Time	Rank	Time	Rank	Time	Rank	Time	Final rank
Orazio Fagone	500 m	DSQ	–	did not advance					
Mirko Vuillermin	500 m	44.29	1 Q	43.85	2 Q	43.58	1 QA	43.47	2nd place, silver medalist(s)
Mirko Vuillermin	1000 m	1:33.51	3	did not advance					
Orazio Fagone	1000 m	1:32.19	2 Q	DSQ	–	did not advance			
Maurizio Carnino; Orazio Fagone; Hugo Herrnhof; Mirko Vuillermin	5000 m relay					7:13.34	1 QA	7:11.74 OR	1st place, gold medalist(s)

Women

Athlete	Event	Round one		Quarter finals		Semi finals		Finals	
Athlete	Event	Time	Rank	Time	Rank	Time	Rank	Time	Final rank
Barbara Baldissera	500 m	1:19.62	3	did not advance					
Marinella Canclini	500 m	47.19	1 Q	1:28.77	4	did not advance			
Katia Mosconi	500 m	47.90	3	did not advance					
Katia Mosconi	1000 m	1:41.51	3	did not advance					
Katia Colturi	1000 m	1:46.89	3	did not advance					
Marinella Canclini	1000 m	1:39.74	2 Q	1:39.20	4	did not advance			
Barbara Baldissera; Marinella Canclini; Katia Colturi; Katia Mosconi; Mara Urbani	3000 m relay					4:45.18	4 QB	4:34.46	4

== Ski jumping ==
Athlete	Event	Jump 1		Jump 2		Total	
Athlete	Event	Distance	Points	Distance	Points	Points	Rank
Ivan Lunardi	Normal hill	84.0	95.5	84.5	103.0	198.5	32
Ivo Pertile	Normal hill	89.5	111.5	80.0	93.0	204.5	31
Roberto Cecon	Normal hill	90.5	115.0	88.5	111.5	226.5	19
Ivo Pertile	Large hill	97.5	72.0	95.5	68.9	140.9	32
Roberto Cecon	Large hill	104.0	85.2	112.5	103.0	188.2	16
Ivan Lunardi	Large hill	108.0	92.4	101.5	79.2	171.6	20

Men's team large hill

Athletes	Result	
Athletes	Points ^{1}	Rank
Roberto Cecon; Ivo Pertile; Ivan Lunardi; Andrea Cecon	782.3	8

^{1} Four teams members performed two jumps each.

== Speed skating ==
Men

Event	Athlete	Race	
Event	Athlete	Time	Rank
500 m	Davide Carta	37.98	32
500 m	Alessandro De Taddei	37.87	29
1000 m	Davide Carta	1:16.46	38
1000 m	Alessandro De Taddei	1:15.62	30
1000 m	Roberto Sighel	1:15.35	25
1500 m	Alessandro De Taddei	DNF	–
1500 m	Davide Carta	1:57.46	34
1500 m	Roberto Sighel	1:54.51	12
5000 m	Roberto Sighel	6:57.70	15
10,000 m	Roberto Sighel	14:27.59	15

Women

Event	Athlete	Race	
Event	Athlete	Time	Rank
1500 m	Elisabetta Pizio	2:11.02	29
1500 m	Elena Belci	2:05.99	12
3000 m	Elena Belci	DSQ	–
3000 m	Elisabetta Pizio	4:32.34	18
5000 m	Elena Belci	7:20.33	4

== Sources ==
- Official Olympic Reports
- International Olympic Committee results database
- Olympic Winter Games 1994, full results by sports-reference.com
