= Hiroyuki Oshima =

Hiroyuki Oshima may refer to:

- Hiroyuki Oshima (bobsleigh)
- Hiroyuki Oshima (baseball)
