= Cobbing =

Cobbing may refer to:

- Cobbing (surname), including a list of people with the name
- Cob (material), methods of constructing buildings using cob or preparing cob building materials for use. Sometimes involves the use of the feet to crush and mix materials and the hands to sculpt walls
- Building trades term for Kludge, derived from the implication that the work was done improperly, as if done with feet instead of hands. Especially ambiguous since the proper way to do some of the cobbing involved in Cob Construction is, in fact, by use of the feet
- A form of spanking using a type of paddle (spanking) known as cob or in full cobbing-board, typically used as a disciplinary measure, often by comrades, in the military, or among sailors
