= Éric Alard =

French bobsledder

Medal record

Bobsleigh

World Championships
Bronze medal – third place	1995 Winterberg	Two-man

Éric Alard (born 26 August 1967) is a French bobsledder who competed during the 1990s. He won a bronze medal in the two-man event at the 1995 FIBT World Championships in Winterberg. He also competed in the two man event at the 1998 Winter Olympics.

Alard in March 2007 started a website named Ordisport.fr, a French site devoted to sport coaching.
