= Michiel de Ruiter =

Dutch freestyle skier

Personal information
- Nationality: Dutch
- Born: 11 March 1964 (age 62) Ermelo, Netherlands

Sport
- Sport: Freestyle skiing

Michiel de Ruiter (born 11 March 1964) is a Dutch freestyle skier. He competed in the men's aerials event at the 1994 Winter Olympics.
