= Glenn Olsson =

Swedish biathlete (born 1976)

Personal information
- Nationality: Swedish
- Born: 22 September 1976 (age 48); Torsby, Sweden

Sport
- Sport: Biathlon

Glenn Olsson (born 22 September 1976) is a Swedish biathlete. He competed in the men's 20 km individual event at the 1994 Winter Olympics.
