= Izet Haračić =

Bosnian bobsledder

Personal information
- Nationality: Bosnian
- Born: 16 July 1965; Sarajevo, Yugoslavia
- Died: 1 September 2015 (aged 50); Round Hill, Virginia, United States

Sport
- Sport: Bobsleigh

Izet Haračić (16 July 1965 – 1 September 2015) was a Bosnian bobsledder. He competed in the four-man event at the 1994 Winter Olympics.
