= FIBT World Championships 1995 =

Bobsleigh and skeleton competition

1995 World Championships
- Location: Winterberg, Germany; Lillehammer, Norway

The FIBT World Championships 1995 took place in Winterberg, Germany (Bobsleigh) and on 1–5 March in Lillehammer, Norway (Skeleton). This was the first time both cities hosted a championship event.

== Two man bobsleigh ==
Pos	Team	Time
Gold	Germany (Christoph Langen, Olav Hampel)	
Silver	Canada (Pierre Lueders, Jack Pyc)	
Bronze	France (Eric Alard, Éric Le Chanony)	

The Canadians earned their first championship medal since 1965 while the French earned their first medal since 1947.

== Four man bobsleigh ==
Pos	Team	Time
Gold	Germany (Wolfgang Hoppe, René Hannemann, Ulf Hielscher, Carsten Embach)	
Silver	Austria (Hubert Schösser, Gerhard Redl, Thomas Schroll, Martin Schützenauer)	
Bronze	Germany (Harald Czudaj, Thorsten Voss, Udo Lehmann, Alexander Szelig)	

== Men's skeleton ==
Pos	Athlete	Time
Gold	Jürg Wenger (SUI)	
Silver	Christian Auer (AUT)	
Bronze	Ryan Davenport (CAN)	

== Medal table ==
Rank	Nation	Gold	Silver	Bronze	Total
1	Germany (GER)	2	0	1	3
2	Switzerland (SUI)	1	0	0	1
3	Austria (AUT)	0	2	0	2
4	Canada (CAN)	0	1	1	2
5	France (FRA)	0	0	1	1
Totals (5 entries)		3	3	3	9
