= Hiroshi Machii =

Japanese freestyle skier (born 1966)

Personal information
- Nationality: Japanese
- Born: 13 February 1966 (age 59); Nagano, Japan

Sport
- Sport: Freestyle skiing

Hiroshi Machii (待井 寛, Machii Hiroshi; born 13 February 1966) is a Japanese freestyle skier. He competed in the men's aerials event at the 1994 Winter Olympics.
