= Cobbing (surname) =

Cobbing is a surname. Notable people with the surname include:

- Bob Cobbing (1920–2002), British poet concentrating on concrete and visual poetry
- Julian Cobbing (born 1944), English historian
- Richard Cobbing (born 1967), British freestyle skier
