= Aydar Teregulov =

Russian bobsledder

Personal information
- Nationality: Russian
- Born: 27 September 1967 (age 57)

Sport
- Sport: Bobsleigh

Aydar Teregulov (born 27 September 1967) is a Russian bobsledder. He competed in the four man event at the 1994 Winter Olympics.
