= Oleksiy Zhukov =

Ukrainian bobsledder

Personal information
- Nationality: Ukrainian
- Born: 30 March 1964 (age 60); Yessentuki, Russian SFSR, Soviet Union

Sport
- Sport: Bobsleigh

Oleksiy Zhukov (born 30 March 1964) is a Ukrainian bobsledder. He competed in the two man and the four man events at the 1994 Winter Olympics.
