= Mats Johansson (skier) =

Swedish freestyle skier

Personal information
- Nationality: Swedish
- Born: 26 January 1971 (age 54); Norberg, Sweden

Sport
- Sport: Freestyle skiing

Mats Johansson (born 26 January 1971) is a Swedish freestyle skier. He competed in the men's aerials event at the 1994 Winter Olympics.
