= Igor Boras =

Bosnian bobsledder (born 1968)

Personal information
- Nationality: Bosnian
- Born: 10 February 1968 (age 57); Sarajevo, Yugoslavia

Sport
- Sport: Bobsleigh

Igor Boras (born 10 February 1968) is a Bosnian bobsledder. He competed in the four-man event at the 1994 Winter Olympics.
