= Biathlon European Championships 1995 =

International biathlon competition

The 2nd Biathlon European Championships were held in Le Grand-Bornand, France. Six competitions were held for athletes U26: sprint, individual and relays.

== Results ==
=== U26 ===
==== Men's ====
Competition	1st	2nd	3rd
Men's 10 km sprint	(France) Raphaël Poirée	(France) Gilles Marguet	(Belarus) Oleg Ryzhenkov
Men's 20 km individual	(Belarus) Igor Khokhryakov	(Belarus) Alexandr Popov	(Germany) Holger Schönthier
Men's 4 × 7.5 km relay	(Belarus) Belarus; Igor Khokhryakov; Alexandr Popov; Oleg Ryzhenkov; Vadim Sashurin	(Germany) Germany; René König; Lars Kreuzer; Markus Quappig; Marco Morgenstern	(Ukraine) Ukraine; Ruslan Lysenko; Valentyn Dzhima; Roman Zvonkov; Taras Dolniy

==== Women's ====
Competition	1st	2nd	3rd
Women's 7.5 km sprint	(France) Corinne Niogret	(Germany) Katrin Apel	(France) Anne Briand
Women's 15 km individual	(Belarus) Svetlana Paramygina	(Ukraine) Nina Lemesh	(France) Emmanuelle Claret
Women's 3 × 6 km relay	(France) France; Corinne Niogret; Florence Baverel; Anne Briand	(Ukraine) Ukraine; Tetyana Vodopyanova; Nina Lemesh; Valentina Tserbe-Nessina	(Germany) Germany; Kathi Schwaab; Steffi Kindt; Martina Zellner

== Medal table ==
No.	Country	Gold	Silver	Bronze	Total
1	France	3	1	2	6
2	Belarus	3	1	1	5
3	Germany	0	2	2	4
4	Ukraine	0	2	1	3
