= Alexander Poe =

United States Virgin Islands bobsledder

Personal information
- Nationality: American Virgin Islander
- Born: March 21, 1974 (age 50)

Sport
- Sport: Bobsleigh

Alexander Poe (born March 21, 1974) is a bobsledder who represented the United States Virgin Islands. He competed in the four-man event at the 1994 Winter Olympics.
