= Herbert Kolly =

Swiss freestyle skier

Personal information
- Nationality: Swiss
- Born: 28 February 1969 (age 56); Plaffeien, Switzerland

Sport
- Sport: Freestyle skiing

Herbert Kolly (born 28 February 1969) is a Swiss freestyle skier who competed in the men's aerials event at the 1994 Winter Olympics.
