= Aleksey Parfenkov =

Belarusian freestyle skier

Personal information
- Nationality: Belarusian
- Born: 13 September 1967 (age 57); Minsk, Belarus

Sport
- Sport: Freestyle skiing

Aleksey Parfenkov (born 13 September 1967) is a Belarusian freestyle skier. He competed in the men's aerials event at the 1994 Winter Olympics.
