= Nizar Zaćiragić =

Bosnian bobsledder (born 1968)

Personal information
- Nationality: Bosnian
- Born: 19 June 1968 (age 56); Sarajevo, SFR Yugoslavia

Sport
- Sport: Bobsleigh

Nizar Zaćiragić (born 19 June 1968) is a Bosnian bobsledder. He competed in the four-man event at the 1994 Winter Olympics.
