= Lennart Westermark =

Swedish bobsledder

Personal information
- Nationality: Swedish
- Born: 15 June 1965 (age 59); Stockholm, Sweden

Sport
- Sport: Bobsleigh

Lennart Westermark (born 15 June 1965) is a Swedish bobsledder. He competed in the four man event at the 1994 Winter Olympics.
