= Hanspeter Knobel =

Swiss biathlete (born 1963)

Personal information
- Nationality: Swiss
- Born: 24 September 1963 (age 61); Altendorf, Switzerland

Sport
- Sport: Biathlon

Hanspeter Knobel (born 24 September 1963) is a Swiss former biathlete. He competed in the men's 20 km individual event at the 1994 Winter Olympics.
