= Mirco Ruggiero =

Italian bobsledder (born 1969)

Personal information
- Nationality: Italian
- Born: 2 February 1969 (age 56); Latina, Italy

Sport
- Sport: Bobsleigh

Mirco Ruggiero (born 2 February 1969) is an Italian former bobsledder. He competed in the four man event at the 1994 Winter Olympics.
