= Bernhard Mair =

Italian bobsledder (born 1971)

Personal information
- Nationality: Italian
- Born: 20 June 1971 (age 55) Bruneck, Italy

Sport
- Sport: Bobsleigh

Bernhard Mair (born 20 June 1971) is an Italian bobsledder. He competed in the four man event at the 1994 Winter Olympics.
