= Richard Cobbing =

British freestyle skier

Personal information
- Nationality: British
- Born: 15 October 1967 (age 57); Newcastle upon Tyne, England

Sport
- Sport: Freestyle skiing

Richard Cobbing (born 15 October 1967) is a British freestyle skier. He competed in the men's aerials event at the 1994 Winter Olympics.
