= Pascal Caron =

Canadian bobsledder

Personal information
- Born: 1 April 1972 (age 52); Cap-de-la-Madeleine, Quebec, Canada

Sport
- Sport: Bobsleigh

Pascal Caron (born 1 April 1972) is a Canadian bobsledder. He competed at the 1994 Winter Olympics and the 2002 Winter Olympics.
