= Ivan Maksymov =

Ukrainian biathlete (born 1963)

Personal information
- Nationality: Ukrainian
- Born: 6 February 1963 (age 62); Zhmerynka, Ukrainian SSR, Soviet Union

Sport
- Sport: Biathlon

Ivan Maksymov (born 6 February 1963) is a Ukrainian biathlete. He competed in the men's sprint event at the 1994 Winter Olympics.
