= Olaf Mihelson =

Estonian biathlete (born 1968)

Personal information
- Nationality: Estonian
- Born: 2 August 1968 (age 57) Tallinn, then part of Estonian SSR, Soviet Union

Sport
- Sport: Biathlon

Olaf Mihelson (born 2 August 1968) is an Estonian biathlete. He competed in the men's sprint event at the 1994 Winter Olympics.
