= Vasyl Lantukh =

Ukrainian bobsledder

Personal information
- Nationality: Ukrainian
- Born: 1 October 1969 (age 55); Kyiv, Ukraine

Sport
- Sport: Bobsleigh

Vasyl Lantukh (born 1 October 1969) is a Ukrainian bobsledder. He competed in the four man event at the 1994 Winter Olympics.
