= Silvio Calcagno =

Italian bobsledder (born 1969)

Personal information
- Nationality: Italian
- Born: 4 May 1969 (age 56); Savona, Italy

Sport
- Sport: Bobsleigh

Silvio Calcagno (born 4 May 1969) is an Italian former bobsledder. He competed in the four man event at the 1994 Winter Olympics.
