= Davide Carta =

Italian speed skater

Personal information
- Nationality: Italian
- Born: 15 June 1972 (age 54) Turin, Italy

Sport
- Sport: Speed skating

Davide Carta (born 15 June 1972) is an Italian speed skater. He competed at the 1994 Winter Olympics, the 1998 Winter Olympics and the 2002 Winter Olympics.
