= Jack Pyc =

Polish-Canadian bobsledder (born 1972)

Medal record

Bobsleigh

World Championships
Silver medal – second place	1995 Winterberg	Two-man

Jack (Jacek) Pyc (born July 17, 1972, in Wrocław, Poland) is a Polish-born, Canadian bobsledder who competed in the 1990s. He won a silver medal in the two-man event at the 1995 FIBT World Championships in Winterberg along with 16 World Cup medals and 3 Overall World Cup Championships.

Pyc also competed in three Winter Olympics, ( 1992 Albertville France, 1994 Lillehammer Norway and 1998 Nagano Japan) earning his best finish of ninth in the four-man at Nagano in 1998.
