= Hiroyuki Oshima (bobsleigh) =

Japanese bobsledder (born 1965)

Personal information
- Nationality: Japanese
- Born: 22 July 1965 (age 59); Tokyo, Japan

Sport
- Sport: Bobsleigh

Hiroyuki Oshima (born 22 July 1965) is a Japanese bobsledder. He competed in the four man event at the 1994 Winter Olympics.
