= Katia Mosconi =

Italian speed skater

Personal information
- Nationality: Italian
- Born: 28 April 1973 (age 53) Aosta, Italy

Sport
- Sport: Short track speed skating
Medal record
Women's short track speed skating
Representing Italy
World Team Championships
Gold medal – first place	1993 Budapest	Team
Bronze medal – third place	1994 Cambridge	Team

Katia Mosconi (born 28 April 1973) is an Italian short track speed skater. She competed in three events at the 1994 Winter Olympics.
