= Erkki Latvala =

Finnish biathlete

Personal information
- Nationality: Finnish
- Born: 20 August 1965 (age 59); Teuva, Finland

Sport
- Sport: Biathlon

Erkki Latvala (born 20 August 1965) is a Finnish biathlete. He competed in the men's sprint event at the 1994 Winter Olympics.
