= Daniel Krčmář =

Slovak biathlete (born 1971)

Personal information
- Nationality: Slovak
- Born: 8 January 1971 (age 54); Ústí nad Orlicí, Czechoslovakia

Sport
- Sport: Biathlon

Daniel Krčmář (born 8 January 1971) is a Slovak biathlete. He competed in the men's sprint event at the 1994 Winter Olympics.
