= Alessandro Scottà =

Italian freestyle skier

Personal information
- Nationality: Italian
- Born: 23 March 1969 (age 55); Vittorio Veneto, Italy

Sport
- Sport: Freestyle skiing

Alessandro Scottà (born 23 March 1969) is an Italian freestyle skier. He competed in the men's aerials event at the 1994 Winter Olympics.
