= Pavel Kotraba =

Slovak biathlete (born 1970)

Personal information
- Nationality: Slovak
- Born: 3 November 1970 (age 54); Teplice, Czechoslovakia

Sport
- Sport: Biathlon

Pavel Kotraba (born 3 November 1970) is a Slovak biathlete. He competed in the men's sprint event at the 1994 Winter Olympics.
