= Georg Franz =

German ice hockey player (born 1965)

Personal information
- Nationality: German
- Born: 9 January 1965 (age 60) Rosenheim, West Germany

Sport
- Sport: Ice hockey

Georg Franz (born 9 January 1965) is a German ice hockey player. He competed in the men's tournaments at the 1988 Winter Olympics and the 1994 Winter Olympics.
