= Martin Schützenauer =

Austrian bobsledder and athlete (born 1962)

Medal record

Men's Bobsleigh

World Championships
Silver medal – second place	1995 Winterberg	Four-man

Martin Schützenauer (born 28 June 1962 in Vienna) is an Austrian bobsledder and athlete who competed from the early 1990s to the early 2000s (decade).

He won a silver medal in the four-man event at the 1995 FIBT World Championships in Winterberg.

Competing in four Winter Olympics, and two (Summer Olympics) Schützenauer earned his best finish of sixth in the four-man event at Lillehammer in 1994.
