= Lukáš Krejčí =

Slovak biathlete (born 1969)

Personal information
- Nationality: Slovak
- Born: 21 July 1969 (age 55); Prague, Czechoslovakia

Sport
- Sport: Biathlon

Lukáš Krejčí (born 21 July 1969) is a Slovak biathlete. He competed in the men's 20 km individual event at the 1994 Winter Olympics.
