= Vasily Gherghy =

Moldovan biathlete (born 1974)

Personal information
- Nationality: Moldovan
- Born: 3 January 1974 (age 51); Izmail, Ukrainian SSR, Soviet Union

Sport
- Sport: Biathlon

Vasily Gherghy (born 3 January 1974) is a Moldovan biathlete. He competed in the men's 20 km individual event at the 1994 Winter Olympics.
