= Hubert Schösser =

Austrian bobsledder

Medal record

Bobsleigh

World Championships
Silver medal – second place	1993 Igls	Four-man
Silver medal – second place	1995 Winterberg	Four-man

Hubert Schösser (born 11 November 1966 in Innsbruck) is an Austrian bobsledder who competed in the mid-1990s. He won two silver medals in the four-man event at the FIBT World Championships, earning them in 1993 and 1995.

Competing in two Winter Olympics, Schösser earned his best finish of fourth in the four-man event at Lillehammer in 1994.

He won the four-man Bobsleigh World Cup championship in 1993-4.
