= Pavel Sládek =

Slovak biathlete (born 1971)

Personal information
- Nationality: Slovak
- Born: 9 July 1971 Ostrava, Czechoslovakia
- Died: 17 March 2000 (aged 28)

Sport
- Sport: Biathlon

Pavel Sládek (9 July 1971 – 17 March 2000) was a Slovak biathlete. He competed in the men's 20 km individual event at the 1994 Winter Olympics.
