= Jürg Wenger =

Swiss skeleton racer

Medal record

Skeleton

World Championships
Gold medal – first place	1995 Lillehammer	Men

Jürg Wenger (born 1969) is a Swiss skeleton racer who competed from 1991 to 2003. He won a gold medal in the men's skeleton event at the 1995 FIBT World Championships in Lillehammer.
