= Yuriy Shulha =

Ukrainian speed skater

Personal information
- Nationality: Ukrainian
- Born: 2 January 1966 (age 59); Vakhrusheve, Ukrainian SSR, Soviet Union

Sport
- Sport: Speed skating

Yuriy Shulha (Ukrainian: Юрій Шульга, born 2 January 1966) is a Ukrainian speed skater. He competed at the 1992 Winter Olympics and the 1994 Winter Olympics.
