= Andriy Petukhov =

Ukrainian bobsledder

Personal information
- Nationality: Ukrainian
- Born: 1 January 1971 (age 54)

Sport
- Sport: Bobsleigh

Andriy Petukhov (born 1 January 1971) is a Ukrainian bobsledder. He competed in the four man event at the 1994 Winter Olympics.
