= Timo Seppälä =

Finnish biathlete

Personal information
- Nationality: Finnish
- Born: 27 June 1968 (age 56); Kauhajoki, Finland

Sport
- Sport: Biathlon

Timo Seppälä (born 27 June 1968) is a Finnish biathlete. He competed in the men's 20 km individual event at the 1994 Winter Olympics.
