= Gerhard Redl =

Austrian bobsledder

Medal record

Bobsleigh

World Championships
Silver medal – second place	1986 Königssee	Four-man
Silver medal – second place	1993 Igls	Four-man
Silver medal – second place	1995 Winterberg	Four-man
Bronze medal – third place	1990 St. Moritz	Four-man

Gerhard Redl (born 18 April 1962 in Dimbach, Upper Austria) is an Austrian bobsledder who won competed from the late 1980s to the mid-1990s. He won four medals in the four-man event at the FIBT World Championships with three silvers (1986, 1993, 1995) and one bronze (1990).

Competing in three Winter Olympics, Redl earned his best finish of fourth in the four-man event at Lillehammer in 1994.
