= Maryna Skolota =

Ukrainian biathlete (born 1963)

Personal information
- Nationality: Ukrainian
- Born: 5 November 1963 (age 61); Krasnoyarsk, Russian SSR, Soviet Union

Sport
- Sport: Biathlon

Maryna Skolota (born 5 November 1963) is a Ukrainian biathlete. She competed in two events at the 1994 Winter Olympics.
