= Alessandro De Taddei =

Italian speed skater

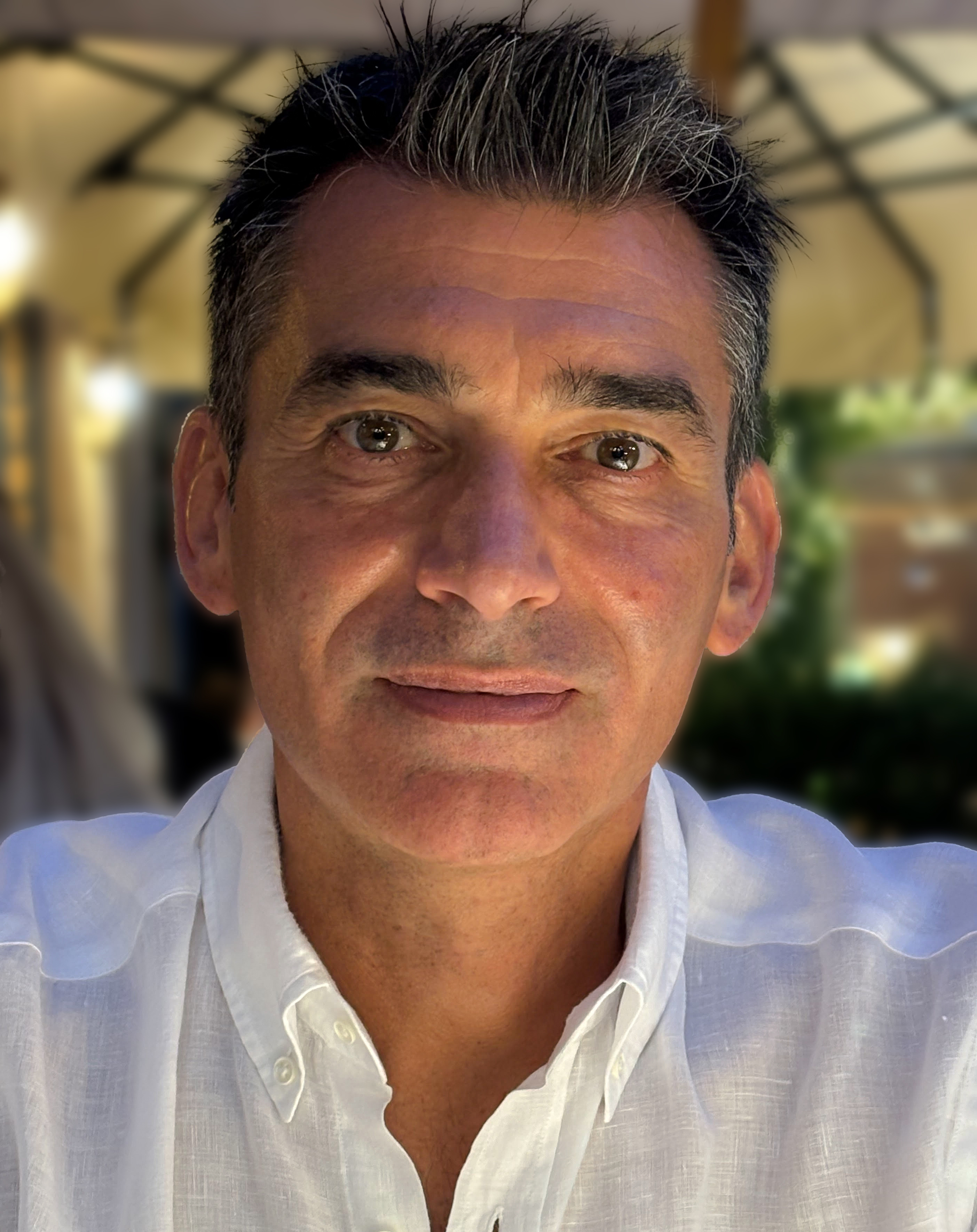

Personal information
- Nationality: Italian
- Born: 25 October 1971 (age 54) Cologna Veneta, Italy

Sport
- Sport: Speed skating

Alessandro De Taddei (born 25 October 1971) is a former Italian speed skater. He competed at the 1992 Winter Olympics and the 1994 Winter Olympics.
