= Alexander Szelig =

German bobsledder (born 1966)

Medal record

Men's Bobsleigh

Representing Germany

Olympic Games
| Gold medal – first place | 1994 Lillehammer | Four-man |

World Championships
| Silver medal – second place | 1990 St. Moritz | Four-man |
| Bronze medal – third place | 1991 Altenberg | Four-man |
| Bronze medal – third place | 1995 Winterberg | Four-man |

Alexander Szelig (born 6 February 1966 in Werdau) is an East German-German bobsledder who competed in the early 1990s. Competing in three Winter Olympics, he won a gold medal in the four-man event with teammates Harald Czudaj, Karsten Brannasch and Olaf Hampel at Lillehammer in 1994.

Szelig also won three medals in the four-man event at the FIBT World Championships with one silver (1990 for East Germany) and two bronzes (1991, 1995, both for Germany).
