= Martin Pfurtscheller =

Austrian biathlete (born 1968)

Personal information
- Nationality: Austrian
- Born: 7 March 1968 (age 57) Hall in Tirol, Austria

Sport
- Sport: Biathlon

Martin Pfurtscheller (born 7 March 1968) is an Austrian former biathlete. He competed in the men's 20 km individual event at the 1994 Winter Olympics.
