= Serhiy But =

Ukrainian freestyle skier

Personal information
- Born: 20 November 1969 (age 56) Mykolaiv, Ukrainian SSR, Soviet Union
- Height: 178 cm (5 ft 10 in)
- Weight: 69 kg (152 lb)

Sport
- Sport: Freestyle skiing
- Club: Ukraïna Mykolaïv

Serhiy Ivanovych But (Ukrainian: Сергій Іванович Бут; born 20 November 1969) is a retired Ukrainian freestyle skier. He competed in the men's aerial event at the 1992 (demonstration), 1994 and 1998 Winter Olympics.
