= Karsten Brannasch =

German bobsledder (born 1966)

Olympic medal record

Men's Bobsleigh

Representing Germany
| Gold medal – first place | 1994 Lillehammer | Four-man |

Karsten Brannasch (born 17 August 1966 in Altdöbern) is a German bobsledder who competed in the early 1990s. He won a gold medal in the four-man event with his teammates Harald Czudaj, Olaf Hampel and Alexander Szelig at the 1994 Winter Olympics in Lillehammer.
