= Vitaliy Mohilenko =

Ukrainian biathlete (born 1965)

Personal information
- Nationality: Ukrainian
- Born: 5 July 1965 (age 59); Sumy, Ukrainian SSR, Soviet Union

Sport
- Sport: Biathlon

Vitaliy Mohilenko (born 5 July 1965) is a Ukrainian biathlete. He competed in the men's 20 km individual event at the 1994 Winter Olympics.
