= Domenico Semeraro =

Swiss bobsledder (born 1964)'

Medal record

Bobsleigh

Olympic Games
Silver medal – second place	1994 Lillehammer	Four-man

World Championships
Gold medal – first place	1993 Igls	Four-man

Domenico Semeraro (born 3 February 1964) is a Swiss bobsledder who competed in the early 1990s. At the 1994 Winter Olympics in Lillehammer, he won a silver medal in the four-man event with his teammates Gustav Weder, Donat Acklin and Kurt Meier.

Semeraro also won a gold medal in the four-man event at the 1993 FIBT World Championships in Igls.
