= Oleksandr Bortiuk =

Ukrainian bobsledder (born 1965)

Personal information
- Nationality: Ukrainian
- Born: 23 February 1965 (age 60); Kolosivka, Polonne Raion, Khmelnytskyi Oblast, Ukrainian SSR, Soviet Union

Sport
- Sport: Bobsleigh

Oleksandr Bortiuk (born 23 February 1965) is a Ukrainian bobsledder. He competed at the 1992 Winter Olympics, representing the Unified Team, and at the 1994 Winter Olympics, representing Ukraine.
