= Valentyn Dzhima =

Ukrainian biathlete (born 1965)

Personal information
- Nationality: Ukrainian
- Born: 21 September 1965 (age 60) Kyiv, Ukrainian SSR, Soviet Union

Sport
- Sport: Biathlon
Medal record
Men's biathlon
Representing Ukraine
European Championships
Bronze medal – third place	1995 Le Grand-Bornand	4 × 7.5 km relay

Valentyn Ivanovych Dzhima (Ukrainian: Валентин Іванович Джима; born 21 September 1965) is a Ukrainian biathlete. He competed in the men's sprint event at the 1994 Winter Olympics.
