= Freddy Romano =

Italian freestyle skier

Personal information
- Nationality: Italian
- Born: 25 July 1966 (age 58); Bern, Switzerland

Sport
- Sport: Freestyle skiing

Freddy Romano (born 25 July 1966) is an Italian freestyle skier. He competed at the 1994 Winter Olympics and the 1998 Winter Olympics.
