= Roman Zvonkov =

Ukrainian biathlete (1967–1995)

Personal information
- Full name: Roman Volodymyrovych Zvonkov
- Nationality: Ukrainian
- Born: 2 July 1967 Yekaterinburg, Russian SFSR, Soviet Union
- Died: 4 September 1995 (aged 28) Sumy Oblast, Ukraine

Sport
- Sport: Biathlon
Medal record
Men's biathlon
Representing Ukraine
European Championships
Bronze medal – third place	1995 Le Grand-Bornand	4 × 7.5 km relay

Roman Volodymyrovych Zvonkov (Ukrainian: Роман Володимирович Звонков; 2 July 1967 – 4 September 1995) was a Ukrainian biathlete. He competed in the men's 20 km individual event at the 1994 Winter Olympics.

== Death ==
Zvonkov died in a car accident in Sumy Oblast at the age of 28 on 4 September 1995.
