= Taras Dolniy =

Ukrainian biathlete (born 1959)

Personal information
- Nationality: Ukrainian
- Born: 18 June 1959 (age 67) Chumali, Ternopil Oblast, Ukrainian SSR, USSR

Sport
- Sport: Biathlon
Medal record
Men's biathlon
Representing Ukraine
European Championships
Bronze medal – third place	1995 Le Grand-Bornand	4 × 7.5 km relay
Representing Soviet Union
Universiade
Gold medal – first place	1983 Sofia	20 km individual
Gold medal – first place	1983 Sofia	10 km sprint
Gold medal – first place	1983 Sofia	4 × 7.5 km relay

Taras Vasylovych Dolniy (Ukrainian: Тарас Васильович Дольний; born 18 June 1959) is a retired Ukrainian biathlete. He competed in the men's 20 km individual event at the 1994 Winter Olympics where he finished 12th.
