= René Hannemann =

German bobsledder (born 1968)

Medal record

Men's Bobsleigh

Representing Germany

Olympic Games
Silver medal – second place	1992 Albertville	Four-man
Bronze medal – third place	1994 Lillehammer	Four-man

World Championships
Gold medal – first place	1995 Winterberg	Four-man
Gold medal – first place	1997 St. Moritz	Four-man
Bronze medal – third place	1991 Altenberg	Two-man
Bronze medal – third place	1993 Igls	Two-man

René Hannemann (born 9 October 1968 in Belzig, Bezirk Potsdam) is a German bobsledder who competed in the early 1990s. Competing in two Winter Olympics, he won two medals in the four-man event with a silver in 1992 and a bronze in 1994.

Hannemann also won four medals at the FIBT World Championships with two golds (Four-man: 1995, 1997) and two bronzes (Two-man: 1991, 1993).
