= Ulf Hielscher =

German bobsledder (born 1967)

Medal record

Men's Bobsleigh

Representing Germany

Olympic Games
Bronze medal – third place	1994 Lillehammer	Four-man

World Championships
Gold medal – first place	1995 Winterberg	Four-man

Ulf Hielscher (born 30 November 1967 in Neubrandenburg, GDR) is a German bobsledder who competed in the 1990s. He won a bronze medal in the four-man event at the 1994 Winter Olympics in Lillehammer.

Hielscher also won a gold medal in the four-man event at the 1995 FIBT World Championships in Winterberg.
