= Carsten Embach =

German bobsledder (born 1968)

Personal information
- Nationality: German
- Born: 12 October 1968 (age 57) Stralsund, Mecklenburg-Vorpommern, East Germany
- Height: 1.89 m (6 ft 2 in)
- Weight: 93 kg (205 lb; 14.6 st)

Sport
- Country: Germany
- Sport: Bobsleigh
- Club: BSR "Rennsteig" Oberhof

Achievements and titles
- Olympic finals: 1st place, gold medalist(s) 3rd place, bronze medalist(s)
Medal record
Men's bobsleigh
Representing Germany
Olympic Games
| Gold medal – first place | 2002 Salt Lake City | Four-man |
| Bronze medal – third place | 1994 Lillehammer | Four-man |
World Championships
| Gold medal – first place | 1995 Winterberg | Four-man |
| Gold medal – first place | 1997 St. Moritz | Four-man |
| Gold medal – first place | 2000 Winterberg | Four-man |
| Gold medal – first place | 2003 Lake Placid | Four-man |
| Silver medal – second place | 2001 St. Moritz | Four-man |
| Bronze medal – third place | 1996 Calgary | Four-man |

Carsten Embach (born 12 October 1968 in Stralsund) is a German bobsledder who competed from the mid-1990s to the early 2000s. Competing in two Winter Olympics, he won two medals in the four-man event with a gold in 2002 and a bronze in 1994.

== Biography ==
Embach also won six medals in the four-man event at the FIBT World Championships with four golds (1995, 1997, 2000, 2003), one silver (2001), and one bronze (1996).

Before turning to bobsleigh Embach competed in the long jump. He finished fifth at the 1990 European Indoor Championships with a jump of 7.83 metres. His personal best jump was 8.01 metres, achieved in June 1990 in Potsdam. He represented the club ASK Vorwärts Potsdam.
