= Kurt Meier =

Swiss bobsledder (born 1962)

Medal record

Men's Bobsleigh

Representing Switzerland

Olympic Games
Gold medal – first place	1988 Calgary	Four-man
Silver medal – second place	1994 Lillehammer	Four-man

World Championships
Gold medal – first place	1986 Königssee	Four-man
Gold medal – first place	1993 Igls	Four-man

Kurt Meier (born 6 April 1962) is a Swiss bobsledder who competed from the mid-1980s to the mid-1990s. Competing in two Winter Olympics, he won two medals in the four-man event with a gold in 1988 and a silver in 1994.

Meier also won two gold medals in the four-man event at the FIBT World Championships, earning them in 1986 and 1993.
