= Harald Czudaj =

German bobsledder (born 1963)

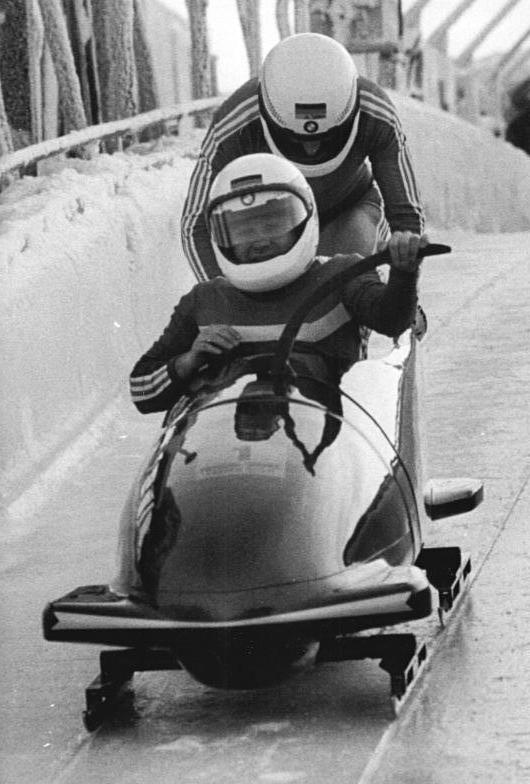
- Czudaj (front) in 1990
Medal record
Men's Bobsleigh
Representing Germany
Olympic Games
Gold medal – first place	1994 Lillehammer	Four-man
World Championships
Silver medal – second place	1990 St. Moritz	Two-man
Silver medal – second place	1990 St. Moritz	Four-man
Bronze medal – third place	1991 Altenberg	Four-man
Bronze medal – third place	1995 Winterberg	Four-man
World Cup Championships
Gold medal – first place	1997-98	Four-man

Harald Czudaj (born 14 February 1963) is a German former bobsledder who competed during the 1990s. He competed in three Winter Olympics and won a gold medal in the four-man event at Lillehammer in 1994.

Czudaj also won four medals at the FIBT World Championships with two silvers (Two-man and four-man: both 1990 for East Germany) and two bronzes (Four-man: 1991, 1995, both for Germany). He also won the 1997-98 Bobsleigh World Cup championship in the four-man event.

Prior to the 1992 Winter Olympics, he came under fire for working as an informer for the Stasi, submitting at least ten reports on his teammates when he was with SV Dynamo in Altenberg, East Germany between 1988 and 1990. Czudaj was allowed to compete following investigation by German sports authorities.

At the 2006 Winter Olympics, Czudaj was a coach for the Dutch women's bobsleigh team.
