= Olaf Hampel =

German bobsledder

Medal record

Men's Bobsleigh

Representing Germany

Olympic Games
Gold medal – first place	1994 Lillehammer	Four-man
Gold medal – first place	1998 Nagano	Four-man

World Championships
Gold medal – first place	1995 Winterberg	Two-man
Gold medal – first place	1996 Calgary	Four-man

Olaf Hampel (sometimes shown as Olav Hampel, born 1 November 1965) is a German bobsledder who competed during the 1990s. Competing in two Winter Olympics, he won gold medals in the four-man event in both 1994 and 1998.

Hampel was also world champion in the two-man event in 1995 and in the four-man in 1996.

== Personal life ==
He has a wife named Kirstine. They live in Nesselwang.
