= Ski jumping at the 1994 Winter Olympics – Large hill team =

Men's large hill team at the XVII Olympic Winter Games
- Pictogram for ski jumping
- Venue: Lysgårdsbakken
- Dates: 22 February 1994
- Competitors: 48 from 12 nations
- Winning score: 970.1

Medalists
1st place, gold medalist(s)		Germany; Hansjörg Jäkle, Christof Duffner, Dieter Thoma, Jens Weißflog
2nd place, silver medalist(s)		Japan; Jinya Nishikata, Takanobu Okabe, Noriaki Kasai, Masahiko Harada
3rd place, bronze medalist(s)		Austria; Heinz Kuttin, Christian Moser, Stefan Horngacher, Andreas Goldberger

The men's large hill team ski jumping competition for the 1994 Winter Olympics was held in Lysgårdsbakken. It took place on 22 February.

== Results ==
Rank	Team	Jump 1	Jump 2	Total
1st place, gold medalist(s)	Germany; Hansjörg Jäkle; Christof Duffner; Dieter Thoma; Jens Weißflog	486.8; 110.1; 113.6; 126.8; 136.3	483.3; 121.7; 92.9; 127.3; 141.4	970.1; 231.8; 206.5; 254.1; 277.7
2nd place, silver medalist(s)	Japan; Jinya Nishikata; Takanobu Okabe; Noriaki Kasai; Masahiko Harada	486.0; 110.4; 124.1; 132.9; 118.6	470.9; 144.0; 137.9; 116.0; 73.0	956.9; 254.4; 262.0; 248.9; 191.6
3rd place, bronze medalist(s)	Austria; Heinz Kuttin; Christian Moser; Stefan Horngacher; Andreas Goldberger	472.0; 107.5; 121.5; 120.7; 122.3	446.9; 111.0; 88.0; 115.9; 132.0	918.9; 218.5; 209.5; 236.6; 254.3
4	Norway; Øyvind Berg; Lasse Ottesen; Roar Ljøkelsøy; Espen Bredesen	449.7; 98.7; 114.7; 110.2; 126.1	449.1; 116.8; 125.1; 75.6; 131.6	898.8; 215.5; 239.8; 185.8; 257.7
5	Finland; Raimo Ylipulli; Janne Väätäinen; Janne Ahonen; Jani Soininen	443.8; 104.4; 108.3; 115.6; 115.5	445.7; 127.2; 103.7; 99.3; 115.5	889.5; 231.6; 212.0; 214.9; 231.0
6	France; Steve Delaup; Nicolas Jean-Prost; Nicolas Dessum; Didier Mollard	414.7; 90.3; 122.0; 103.2; 99.2	407.4; 112.9; 102.0; 99.2; 93.3	822.1; 203.2; 224.0; 202.4; 192.5
7	Czech Republic; Ladislav Dluhoš; Zbyněk Krompolc; Jiří Parma; Jaroslav Sakala	401.9; 94.2; 109.5; 92.1; 106.1	398.8; 105.6; 112.4; 83.0; 97.8	800.7; 199.8; 221.9; 175.1; 203.9
8	Italy; Ivo Pertile; Andrea Cecon; Roberto Cecon; Ivan Lunardi	405.8; 96.1; 87.9; 123.5; 98.3	376.5; 103.7; 69.9; 112.7; 90.2	782.3; 199.8; 157.8; 236.2; 188.5
9	Slovenia; Matjaž Kladnik; Matjaž Zupan; Samo Gostiša; Robert Meglič	377.3; 96.9; 94.7; 87.8; 97.9	362.1; 66.9; 85.5; 92.4; 117.3	739.4; 163.8; 180.2; 180.2; 215.2
10	Sweden; Staffan Tällberg; Mikael Martinsson; Johan Rasmussen; Fredrik Johansson	320.7; 78.5; 103.8; 88.0; 50.4	332.6; 109.2; 105.5; 57.5; 60.4	653.3; 187.7; 209.3; 145.5; 110.8
11	United States; Randy Weber; Gregory Boester; Kurt Stein; Ted Langlois	235.2; 50.8; 75.3; 48.4; 60.7	269.8; 79.7; 71.1; 50.6; 68.4	505.0; 130.5; 146.4; 99.0; 129.1
12	Russia; Aleksey Solodyankin; Dmitry Chelovenko; Stanislav Pokhliko; Mikhail Yesin	198.0; 29.7; 54.1; 58.4; 55.8	218.3; 50.7; 47.0; 57.9; 62.7	416.3; 80.4; 101.1; 116.3; 118.5
