= Russia at the 1994 Winter Olympics =

- Flag of the Russian Federation
- IOC code: RUS
- NOC: Russian Olympic Committee
- Website: www.roc.ru (in Russian)

in Lillehammer
- Competitors: 113 (75 men, 38 women) in 12 sports
- Flag bearer: Sergei Tchepikov
- Medals Ranked 1st: Gold 11 Silver 8 Bronze 4 Total 23

Winter Olympics appearances (overview)
- 1994; 1998; 2002; 2006; 2010; 2014; 2018–2026

Other related appearances
- Soviet Union (1956–1988); Unified Team (1992); Olympic Athletes from Russia (2018); ROC (2022); Individual Neutral Athletes (2026)

Russia competed at the 1994 Winter Olympics in Lillehammer, Norway. It was the first time the nation had competed at the Winter Olympic Games since the dissolution of the Soviet Union in 1991. Russian athletes had competed as part of the Unified Team at the 1992 Winter Olympics.

== Medalists ==
Medal	Name	Sport	Event	Date
Gold	Aleksandr Golubev	Speed skating	Men's 500 metres	14 February
Gold	Lyubov Yegorova	Cross-country skiing	Women's 5 kilometre classical	15 February
Gold	Ekaterina Gordeeva; Sergei Grinkov	Figure skating	Pairs	15 February
Gold	Lyubov Yegorova	Cross-country skiing	Women's 10 kilometre freestyle pursuit	17 February
Gold	Svetlana Bazhanova	Speed skating	Women's 3000 metres	17 February
Gold	Alexei Urmanov	Figure skating	Men's singles	19 February
Gold	Sergei Tarasov	Biathlon	Men's individual	20 February
Gold	Nina Gavrilyuk; Larisa Lazutina; Yelena Välbe; Lyubov Yegorova	Cross-country skiing	Women's 4 × 5 kilometre relay	21 February
Gold	Oksana Grishuk; Evgeny Platov	Figure skating	Ice dance	21 February
Gold	Sergei Tchepikov	Biathlon	Men's sprint	23 February
Gold	Luiza Noskova; Anfisa Reztsova; Natalya Snytina; Nadezhda Talanova	Biathlon	Women's relay	25 February
Silver	Lyubov Yegorova	Cross-country skiing	Women's 15 kilometre freestyle	13 February
Silver	Sergey Klevchenya	Speed skating	Men's 500 metres	14 February
Silver	Svetlana Gladisheva	Alpine skiing	Women's super-G	15 February
Silver	Vladimir Drachev; Valeri Kiriyenko; Sergei Tarasov; Sergei Tchepikov	Biathlon	Men's relay	15 February
Silver	Natalia Mishkutenok; Artur Dmitriev	Figure skating	Pairs	15 February
Silver	Sergey Shupletsov	Freestyle skiing	Men's moguls	16 February
Silver	Svetlana Fedotkina	Speed skating	Women's 1500 metres	21 February
Silver	Maya Usova; Alexander Zhulin	Figure skating	Ice dance	21 February
Bronze	Nina Gavrilyuk	Cross-country skiing	Women's 15 km freestyle	13 February
Bronze	Yelizaveta Kozhevnikova	Freestyle skiing	Women's moguls	16 February
Bronze	Sergey Klevchenya	Speed skating	Men's 1000 metres	18 February
Bronze	Sergei Tarasov	Biathlon	Men's sprint	23 February

== Competitors ==
The following is the list of number of competitors in the Games.

Sport	Men	Women	Total
Alpine skiing	2	4	6
Biathlon	5	5	10
Bobsleigh	6	–	6
Cross-country skiing	7	6	13
Figure skating	9	6	15
Freestyle skiing	1	5	6
Ice hockey	23	–	23
Luge	6	2	8
Nordic combined	4	–	4
Short track speed skating	2	4	6
Ski jumping	4	–	4
Speed skating	6	6	12
Total	75	38	113

== Alpine skiing ==
Men

Athlete	Event	Final				
Athlete	Event	Run 1	Run 2	Run 3	Total	Rank
Vasili Bezsmelnitsyn	Downhill				Disqualified	
Vasili Bezsmelnitsyn	Super-G				1:36.50	34
Vasili Bezsmelnitsyn	Giant slalom	DNF			did not finish	
Vasili Bezsmelnitsyn	Combined	1:41.19	DNF		did not finish	
Andrei Filichkin	Downhill				1:48.81	37
Andrei Filichkin	Super-G				1:35.26	30
Andrei Filichkin	Giant slalom	DNF			did not finish	
Andrei Filichkin	Combined	1:39.77	DNF		did not finish	

Women

Athlete	Event	Final				
Athlete	Event	Run 1	Run 2	Run 3	Total	Rank
Nataliya Buga	Super-G				1:26.09	34
Nataliya Buga	Downhill				1:40.93	35
Nataliya Buga	Combined	1:32.01	DNS		did not finish	
Nataliya Buga	Giant slalom	DNF			did not finish	
Svetlana Gladisheva	Super-G				1:22.44	2nd place, silver medalist(s)
Svetlana Gladisheva	Downhill				1:38.10	17
Svetlana Gladisheva	Combined	1:29.45	DNF		did not finish	
Mira Golub	Super-G				1:27.23	38
Mira Golub	Downhill				1:43.21	38
Mira Golub	Combined	1:33.80	DNS		did not finish	
Varvara Zelenskaya	Super-G				1:23.80	21
Varvara Zelenskaya	Downhill				1:37.48	8
Varvara Zelenskaya	Combined	1:29.66	DNS		did not finish	

== Biathlon ==
Men

Athlete	Event	Final		
Athlete	Event	Time	Misses	Rank
Vladimir Drachev	10 km sprint	28:28.9	1	4
Valeri Kiriyenko	20 km individual	1:01:46.3	3	35
Valeri Kiriyenko	10 km sprint	30:06.2	3	16
Valeriy Medvedtsev	20 km individual	1:00:44.0	3	24
Sergei Tchepikov	20 km individual	59:31.4	5	8
Sergei Tchepikov	10 km sprint	28:07.0	0	1st place, gold medalist(s)
Sergei Tarasov	20 km individual	57:25.3	3	1st place, gold medalist(s)
Sergei Tarasov	10 km sprint	28:27.4	1	3rd place, bronze medalist(s)
Valeri Kiriyenko; Vladimir Drachev; Sergei Tarasov; Sergei Tchepikov	4 x 7.5 km relay	1:31:23.6	2	2nd place, silver medalist(s)

Women

Athlete	Event	Final		
Athlete	Event	Time	Misses	Rank
Lyubov Belyakova	7.5 km sprint	28:37.0	2	42
Luiza Noskova	15 km individual	54:18.2	4	10
Luiza Noskova	7.5 km sprint	28:27.8	5	39
Anfisa Reztsova	15 km individual	56:10.2	8	26
Anfisa Reztsova	7.5 km sprint	28:09.8	7	32
Natalya Snytina	15 km individual	55:58.7	4	23
Nadezhda Talanova	15 km individual	55:14.0	5	16
Nadezhda Talanova	7.5 km sprint	27:18.1	2	19
Nadezhda Talanova; Natalya Snytina; Luiza Noskova; Anfisa Reztsova	4 x 7.5 km relay	1:47:19.5	0	1st place, gold medalist(s)

== Bobsleigh ==
Athlete	Event	Final					
Athlete	Event	Run 1	Run 2	Run 3	Run 4	Total	Rank
Oleg Sukhoruchenko; Andrei Gorokhov	Two-man	53.88	54.11	54.09	54.01	3:36.09	26
Vladimir Yefimov; Oleg Petrov	Two-man	54.19	54.21	54.30	54.40	3:37.10	29
Oleg Sukhoruchenko; Aidar Teregulov; Sergei Kruglov; Oleg Petrov	Four-man	53.15	53.20	53.44	53.39	3:33.18	24

== Cross-country skiing ==
Men

Athlete	Event	Final	
Athlete	Event	Total	Rank
Igor Badamchin	30 km freestyle	2:12:20.1	14
Igor Badamchin	50 km classical	2:11:52.8	13
Mikhail Botvinov	30 km freestyle	1:14:43.3	4
Mikhail Botvinov	10 km classical	24:58.9	4
Mikhail Botvinov	15 km freestyle pursuit	1:01:57.8	5
Mikhail Botvinov	50 km classical	2:10:18.9	9
Andrey Kirillov	10 km classical	25:41.2	13
Andrey Kirillov	15 km freestyle pursuit	1:03:59.7	16
Gennadiy Lazutin	30 km freestyle	1:16:45.9	15
Vladimir Legotin	10 km classical	25:52.6	18
Vladimir Legotin	15 km freestyle pursuit	1:04:00.1	17
Alexey Prokurorov	30 km freestyle	1:19:15.3	28
Alexey Prokurorov	10 km classical	25:55.3	20
Alexey Prokurorov	15 km freestyle pursuit	1:03:07.8	12
Alexey Prokurorov	50 km classical	2:11:52.8	13
Aleksandr Vorobyov	50 km classical	2:13:44.5	17
Andrey Kirillov; Alexey Prokurorov; Gennadiy Lazutin; Mikhail Botvinov	4 x 10 km relay	1:44:29.2	5

Women

Athlete	Event	Final	
Athlete	Event	Total	Rank
Nina Gavrilyuk	15 km freestyle	41:10.4	3rd place, bronze medalist(s)
Nina Gavrilyuk	5 km classical	15:01.6	11
Nina Gavrilyuk	10 km freestyle pursuit	42:36.9	5
Larisa Lazutina	15 km freestyle	41:57.6	5
Larisa Lazutina	5 km classical	14:44.2	6
Larisa Lazutina	10 km freestyle pursuit	42:36.6	4
Nataliya Martynova	30 km classical	1:31:59.4	23
Svetlana Nageykina	5 km classical	15:08.5	16
Svetlana Nageykina	10 km freestyle pursuit	44:31.7	19
Svetlana Nageykina	30 km classical	1:27:57.2	9
Yelena Välbe	15 km freestyle	42:26.6	6
Yelena Välbe	30 km classical	1:26:57.4	6
Lyubov Yegorova	15 km free	41:03.0	2nd place, silver medalist(s)
Lyubov Yegorova	5 km classical	14:08.8	1st place, gold medalist(s)
Lyubov Yegorova	10 km freestyle pursuit	41:38.1	1st place, gold medalist(s)
Lyubov Yegorova	30 km classical	1:26:54.8	5
Yelena Välbe; Larisa Lazutina; Nina Gavrilyuk; Lyubov Yegorova	4 x 5 km relay	57:12.5	1st place, gold medalist(s)

== Figure skating ==
Athlete	Event	CD1	CD2	SP/OD	FS/FD	Points	Rank
Igor Pashkevich	Men's			14	15	22.0	15
Oleg Tataurov	Men's			5	13	15.5	11
Alexei Urmanov	Men's			1	1	1.5	1st place, gold medalist(s)
Ekaterina Gordeeva; Sergei Grinkov	Pairs			1	1	1.5	1st place, gold medalist(s)
Natalia Mishkutenok; Artur Dmitriev	Pairs			2	2	3.0	2nd place, silver medalist(s)
Evgenia Shishkova; Vadim Naumov	Pairs			4	4	6.0	4
Oksana Grishuk; Evgeny Platov	Ice dance	2	1	3	1	3.4	1st place, gold medalist(s)
Anjelika Krylova; Vladimir Fedorov	Ice dance	6	6	6	6	12.0	6
Maya Usova; Alexander Zhulin	Ice dance	1	2	2	2	3.8	2nd place, silver medalist(s)

== Freestyle skiing ==
Men

Athlete	Event	Qualifying		Final	
Athlete	Event	Points	Rank	Points	Rank
Sergey Shupletsov	Moguls	26.64	3 Q	26.90	2nd place, silver medalist(s)

Women

Athlete	Event	Qualifying		Final	
Athlete	Event	Points	Rank	Points	Rank
Marina Cherkasova	Moguls	22.60	13 Q	22.32	14
Lyudmila Dymchenko	Moguls	22.47	14 Q	23.12	12
Yelena Korolyova	Moguls	22.23	16 Q	22.22	15
Yelizaveta Kozhevnikova	Moguls	24.70	3 Q	25.81	3rd place, bronze medalist(s)
Nataliya Orekhova	Aerials	150.40	6 Q	134.92	12

== Ice hockey ==
Men

- Head coach: (Russia) Viktor Tikhonov

Pos.	No.	Player	Team
GK	1	Andrei Zuev	(Russia) Traktor Chelyabinsk
GK	35	Sergei Abramov	(Russia) Ak Bars Kazan
GK	20	Valery Ivannikov	(Russia) SKA St. Petersburg
D	2	Oleg Davydov	(Russia) Traktor Chelyabinsk
D	4	Sergei Sorokin	(Russia) Dynamo Moscow
D	5	Alexander Smirnov	(Finland) TPS
D	3	Sergei Tertyshny	(Russia) Traktor Chelyabinsk
D	6	Vladimir Tarasov	(Russia) Lada Togliatti
D	22	Sergei Shendelev	(Germany) EC Hedos München
D	10	Igor Ivanov	(Russia) Krylia Sovetov Moscow
D	26	Oleg Shargorodsky	(Russia) Dynamo Moscow
F	24	Andrei Nikolishin	(Russia) Dynamo Moscow
F	12	Sergei Berezin	(Russia) Khimik Voskresensk
F	19	Aleksandr Vinogradov	(Russia) SKA St. Petersburg
F	14	Valeri Karpov	(Russia) Traktor Chelyabinsk
F	21	Dmitri Denisov	(Russia) Salavat Yulaev Ufa
F	29	Ravil Gusmanov	(Russia) Traktor Chelyabinsk
F	23	Pavel Torgayev	(Finland) TPS
F	9	Alexei Kudashov	(Canada) St. John's Maple Leafs
F	28	Andrei Tarasenko	(Russia) Traktor Chelyabinsk
F	16	Igor Varitsky	(Russia) Traktor Chelyabinsk
F	11	Georgi Yevtyukhin	(Russia) Spartak Moscow
F	25	Vyacheslav Bezukladnikov	(Russia) Lada Togliatti

Preliminary round

Team	GP	W	L	T	GF	GA	PTS
Finland	5	5	0	0	25	5	10
Germany	5	3	2	0	11	14	6
Czech Republic	5	3	2	0	16	11	6
Russia	5	3	2	0	20	14	6
Austria	5	1	4	0	13	28	2
Norway	5	0	5	0	5	19	0

12 February 1994; 17:30	Norway	1–5 (1–2, 0–1, 0–2)	Russia	Gjøvik Olympiske Fjellhall; Attendance: 5 000

	0–1	Gusmanov
	0–2	Berezin
Rath	1–2
	1–3	Tarasenko
	1–4	Karpov
	1–5	Sorokin

14 February 1994; 20:00	Finland	5–0 (1–0, 4–0, 0–0)	Russia	Håkons Hall; Attendance: 8 751

Lehtinen	1–0
Koivu	2–0
Alatalo	3–0
Ojanen	4–0
Kiprusoff	5–0

16 February 1994; 15:30	Russia	9–1 (1–0, 7–1, 1–0)	Austria	Håkons Hall; Attendance: 6 500

Berezin	1–0
Varitsky	2–0
Vinogradov	3–0
Smirnov	4–0
Davydov	5–0
Denisov	6–0
Vinogradov	7–0
Denisov	8–0
	8–1	Burton
Gusmanov	9–1

18 February 1994; 15:00	Germany	4–2 (2–0, 1–1, 1–1)	Russia	Håkons Hall; Attendance: 8 600

Truntschka	1–0
Truntschka	2–0
Stefan	3–0
	3–1	Torgayev
	3–2	Kudashov
Kummer	4–2

20 February 1994; 15:00	Russia	4–3 (2–2, 2–0, 0–1)	Czech Republic	Håkons Hall; Attendance: 9 200

Andrei Zuyev
Goalies
Petr Bříza

Karpov	1–0
Denisov	2–0
	2–1	Hrbek
	2–2	Alinc
Nikolishin	3–2
Karpov	4–2
	4–3	Vykoukal

Play-off

Quarterfinal

23 February 1994; 21:00	Slovakia	2–3 (2–1, 0–1, 0–0, 0–1)	Russia	Håkons Hall; Attendance: 6 000

Eduard Hartman
Goalies
Andrei Zuyev

Šťastný	1–0
	1–1	Torgayev
Šatan	2–1
	2–2	Nikolishin
	2–3	Vinogradov

Semifinal

25 February 1994; 22:00	Sweden	4–3 (2–1, 1–0, 1–2)	Russia	Håkons Hall; Attendance: 8 528

Tommy Salo
Goalies
Andrei Zuyev

Svensson	1–0
Juhlin	2–0
	2–1	Tarasenko
Bergqvist	3–1
Juhlin	4–1
	4–2	Berezin
	4–3	Gusmanov

Bronze medal match

26 February 1994; 21:00	Finland	4–0 (2–0, 2–0, 0–0)	Russia	Håkons Hall; Attendance: 10 000

Palo	1–0
Alatalo	2–0
Peltonen	3–0
Strömberg	4–0

== Luge ==
Athlete	Event	Final					
Athlete	Event	Run 1	Run 2	Run 3	Run 4	Total	Rank
Eduard Burmistrov	Men's singles	51.102	51.351	50.877	51.063	3:24.393	14
Sergey Danilin	Men's singles	50.767	50.973	50.665	50.856	3:23.261	11
Albert Demtschenko	Men's singles	50.601	50.863	50.633	50.530	3:22.627	9
Irina Gubkina	Women's singles	49.167	49.231	49.376	49.424	3:17.198	7
Olga Novikova	Women's singles	49.860	50.044	49.842	50.231	3:19.977	18
Anatoli Bobkov; Gennadi Belyakov	Doubles	49.296	49.384			1:38.680	15
Albert Demtschenko; Aleksei Zelensky	Doubles	48.655	48.822			1:37.477	7

== Nordic combined ==
Athlete	Event	Ski jumping		Cross-country		
Athlete	Event	Points	Rank	Deficit	Time	Rank
Dmitri Dubrovsky	Individual 15 km	139.0	53	12:00	52:27.6 +13:19.7	47
Stanislav Dubrovsky	Individual 15 km	162.0	49	9:26	51:37.0 +12:29.1	45
Valery Kobelev	Individual 15 km	180.0	38	7:26	53:12.5 +14:04.6	48
Valeri Stolyarov	Individual 15 km	174.5	40	8:03	49:54.2 +10:46.3	43
Valery Kobelev; Stanislav Dubrovsky; Valeri Stolyarov	3 x 10 km relay	503.0	12	19:12	1:49:55.0 +27:03.2	12

== Short track speed skating ==
Men

Athlete	Event	Heat		Quarterfinal		Semifinal		Final	
Athlete	Event	Time	Rank	Time	Rank	Time	Rank	Time	Rank
Sergei Kobozev	500 m	44.54	3	did not advance					17
Sergei Kobozev	1000 m	1:33.07	3	did not advance					20
Igor Ozerov	500 m	45.48	3	did not advance					20
Igor Ozerov	1000 m	1:44.38	4	did not advance					30

Women

Athlete	Event	Heat		Quarterfinal		Semifinal		Final	
Athlete	Event	Time	Rank	Time	Rank	Time	Rank	Time	Rank
Marina Pylayeva	500 m	47.47	2 Q	Disqualification		did not advance			16
Marina Pylayeva	1000 m	1:44.38	1 Q	1:42.15	4	did not advance			12
Yelena Tikhanina	500 m	47.79	3	did not advance					17
Yelena Tikhanina	1000 m	1:53.92	3	did not advance					24
Viktoriya Troytskaya	500 m	48.59	3	did not advance					20
Viktoriya Troytskaya	1000 m	1:59.84	4	did not advance					29
Yekaterina Mikhaylova; Marina Pylayeva; Yelena Tikhanina; Viktoriya Troytskaya	3000 m relay					4:33.47	3	4:34.60	Final B 5

== Ski jumping ==
Athlete	Event	First round		Final		
Athlete	Event	Points	Rank	Points	Total	Rank
Dmitri Chelovenko	Large hill	45.4	48	41.0	86.4	49
Dmitri Chelovenko	Normal hill	66.0	57	70.5	136.5	54
Stanislav Pokhilko	Large hill	54.5	44	54.9	109.4	44
Stanislav Pokhilko	Normal hill	93.5	44	80.5	174.0	41
Aleksei Solodyankin	Large hill	26.1	55	32.1	58.2	57
Aleksei Solodyankin	Normal hill	81.0	54	87.0	168.0	45
Mikhail Yesin	Large hill	65.4	41	46.9	112.3	42
Mikhail Yesin	Normal hill	87.0	50	Disqualified		
Aleksei Solodyankin; Dmitri Chelovenko; Stanislav Pokhilko; Mikhail Yesin	Team	198.0	12	218.3	416.3	12

== Speed skating ==
Men

Athlete	Event	Time	Rank
Andrey Anufriyenko	5000 m	6:53.23	11
Andrey Anufriyenko	1500 m	1:53.16	5
Andrey Anufriyenko	10000 m	14:18.42	12
Andrei Bakhvalov	500 m	37.24	16
Andrei Bakhvalov	1000 m	1:15.36	26
Aleksandr Golubev	500 m	36.33 OR	1st place, gold medalist(s)
Aleksandr Golubev	1000 m	1:14.78	17
Sergey Klevchenya	500 m	36.39	2nd place, silver medalist(s)
Sergey Klevchenya	1000 m	1:12.85	3rd place, bronze medalist(s)
Oleg Pavlov	5000 m	7:07.09	31
Oleg Pavlov	1500 m	1:54.90	16
Mikhail Vostroknutov	500 m	37.15	15
Mikhail Vostroknutov	1000 m	did not finish	

Women

Athlete	Event	Time	Rank
Svetlana Bazhanova	3000 m	4:17.43	1st place, gold medalist(s)
Svetlana Bazhanova	1500 m	2:03.99	6
Svetlana Bazhanova	5000 m	7:22.68	5
Svetlana Boyarkina	500 m	40.17	7
Svetlana Boyarkina	1000 m	1:22.44	24
Svetlana Fedotkina	500 m	41.05	20
Svetlana Fedotkina	1500 m	2:02.69	2nd place, silver medalist(s)
Svetlana Fedotkina	1000 m	1:20.89	11
Nataliya Polozkova	500 m	41.06	22
Nataliya Polozkova	1500 m	2:04.00	7
Nataliya Polozkova	1000 m	1:20.84	10
Oksana Ravilova	500 m	40.72	17
Oksana Ravilova	1500 m	2:08.65	25
Oksana Ravilova	1000 m	1:20.82	9
Tatyana Trapeznikova	3000 m	4:27.82	12
Tatyana Trapeznikova	5000 m	7:40.55	13

== Sources ==
- Official Olympic Reports
- International Olympic Committee results database
