= Speed skating at the 1994 Winter Olympics – Men's 1000 metres =

Speed skating at the Olympics

Men's 1000 metres at the XVII Olympic Winter Games
- Pictogram for speed skating
- Venue: Hamar Olympic Hall
- Dates: 18 February 1994
- Competitors: 43 from 17 nations
- Winning time: 1:12.43 WR

Medalists
1st place, gold medalist(s)		Dan Jansen; United States
2nd place, silver medalist(s)		Igor Zhelezovski; Belarus
3rd place, bronze medalist(s)		Sergey Klevchenya; Russia

The men's 1000 metres in speed skating at the 1994 Winter Olympics took place on 18 February, at the Hamar Olympic Hall.

== Records ==
Prior to this competition, the existing world and Olympic records were as follows:

World record	Kevin Scott (CAN)	1:12.54	Calgary, Canada	17 December 1993
Olympic record	Nikolai Gulyayev (URS)	1:13.03	Calgary, Canada	18 February 1988

The following new World and Olympic records was set during this competition.

Date	Pair	Athlete	Country	Time	OR	WR
18 February	Pair 1	Igor Zhelezovski	Belarus	1:12.72	OR	
18 February	Pair 4	Dan Jansen	United States	1:12.43	OR	WR

== Results ==
Rank	Pair	Lane	Name	Country	Time	Time behind	Notes
1st place, gold medalist(s)	4	O	Dan Jansen	United States	1:12.43	-	(WR)
2nd place, silver medalist(s)	1	O	Igor Zhelezovski	Belarus	1:12.72	+0.29	
3rd place, bronze medalist(s)	1	I	Sergey Klevchenya	Russia	1:12.85	+0.42	
4	6	O	Liu Hongbo	China	1:13.47	+1.04	
5	5	O	Sylvain Bouchard	Canada	1:13.56	+1.13	
6	3	I	Pat Kelly	Canada	1:13.67	+1.24	
7	10	I	Roger Strøm	Norway	1:13.74	+1.31	
8	4	I	Junichi Inoue	Japan	1:13.75	+1.32	
9	11	O	Gerard van Velde	Netherlands	1:13.81	+1.38	
10	6	I	Kevin Scott	Canada	1:13.82	+1.39	
11	10	O	Toshiyuki Kuroiwa	Japan	1:13.95	+1.52	
12	12	I	Roland Brunner	Austria	1:14.08	+1.65	
13	7	O	Peter Adeberg	Germany	1:14.15	+1.72	
14	5	I	Yukinori Miyabe	Japan	1:14.28	+1.85	
15	9	O	Nico van der Vlies	Netherlands	1:14.29	+1.86	
16	13	O	Sean Ireland	Canada	1:14.31	+1.88	
17	9	I	Aleksandr Golubev	Russia	1:14.78	+2.35	
18	2	O	Kim Yoon-man	South Korea	1:14.97	+2.54	
19	3	I	Hiroyasu Shimizu	Japan	1:15.01	+2.58	
20	12	O	Vadim Shakshakbayev	Kazakhstan	1:15.06	+2.63	
21	11	I	Nathaniel Mills	United States	1:15.11	+2.68	
22	21	O	Arie Loef	Netherlands	1:15.12	+2.69	
23	17	O	Magnus Enfeldt	Sweden	1:15.18	+2.75	
24	14	I	Arjan Schreuder	Netherlands	1:15.19	+2.76	
25	17	I	Roberto Sighel	Italy	1:15.35	+2.92	
26	8	O	Andrey Bakhvalov	Russia	1:15.36	+2.93	
27	19	O	Michael Spielmann	Germany	1:15.41	+2.98	
28	20	O	Lars Funke	Germany	1:15.44	+3.01	
29	13	I	Hans Markström	Sweden	1:15.50	+3.07	
30	15	I	Dave Besteman	United States	1:15.62	+3.19	
30	19	I	Alessandro De Taddei	Italy	1:15.62	+3.19	
32	18	O	Lee Kyou-hyuk	South Korea	1:15.92	+3.49	
33	22	I	Oleh Kostromitin	Ukraine	1:15.95	+3.52	
34	16	O	Vladimir Klepinin	Kazakhstan	1:15.99	+3.56	
35	18	I	Brendan Eppert	United States	1:16.07	+3.64	
36	15	O	Zsolt Baló	Romania	1:16.16	+3.73	
37	14	O	Phillip Tahmindjis	Australia	1:16.29	+3.86	
38	21	I	Davide Carta	Italy	1:16.46	+4.03	
39	16	I	Jaegal Sung-yeol	South Korea	1:16.64	+4.21	
40	20	I	Lee Jae-sik	South Korea	1:16.96	+4.53	
-	2	I	Grunde Njøs	Norway	DNF		
-	7	I	Mikhail Vostroknutov	Russia	DNF		
-	8	I	Ådne Søndrål	Norway	DQ		
