= Speed skating at the 1994 Winter Olympics – Men's 500 metres =

Speed skating at the Olympics

Men's 500 metres at the XVII Olympic Winter Games
- Pictogram for speed skating
- Venue: Hamar Olympic Hall
- Dates: 14 February 1994
- Competitors: 40 from 16 nations
- Winning time: 36.33 OR

Medalists
1st place, gold medalist(s)		Aleksandr Golubev; Russia
2nd place, silver medalist(s)		Sergey Klevchenya; Russia
3rd place, bronze medalist(s)		Manabu Horii; Japan

The men's 500 metres in speed skating at the 1994 Winter Olympics took place on 14 February, at the Hamar Olympic Hall.

== Records ==
Prior to this competition, the existing world and Olympic records were as follows:

World record	Dan Jansen (USA)	35.76	Calgary, Canada	30 January 1994
Olympic record	Uwe-Jens Mey (GDR)	36.45	Calgary, Canada	14 February 1988

The following new Olympic records were set during this competition.

Date	Pair	Athlete	Country	Time	OR	WR
14 February	Pair 6	Sergey Klevchenya	Russia	36.39	OR	
14 February	Pair 9	Aleksandr Golubev	Russia	36.33	OR	

== Results ==
Rank	Pair	Lane	Name	Country	Time	Difference	Notes
1st place, gold medalist(s)	9	I	Aleksandr Golubev	Russia	36.33	-	OR
2nd place, silver medalist(s)	6	I	Sergey Klevchenya	Russia	36.39	+0.06	
3rd place, bronze medalist(s)	4	O	Manabu Horii	Japan	36.53	+0.20	
4	1	I	Liu Hongbo	China	36.54	+0.21	
5	8	O	Hiroyasu Shimizu	Japan	36.60	+0.27	
6	5	I	Junichi Inoue	Japan	36.63	+0.30	
7	9	O	Grunde Njøs	Norway	36.66	+0.33	
8	2	I	Dan Jansen	United States	36.68	+0.35	
9	6	O	Yasunori Miyabe	Japan	36.72	+0.39	
10	5	O	Igor Zhelezovski	Belarus	36.73	+0.40	
11	1	I	Sylvain Bouchard	Canada	37.01	+0.68	
12	4	I	Pat Kelly	Canada	37.07	+0.74	
12	11	I	Vadim Shakshakbayev	Kazakhstan	37.07	+0.74	
14	3	O	Kim Yoon-man	South Korea	37.10	+0.77	
15	8	I	Mikhail Vostroknutov	Russia	37.15	+0.82	
16	7	I	Andrey Bakhvalov	Russia	37.24	+0.91	
17	2	O	Sean Ireland	Canada	37.30	+0.97	
18	14	O	Peter Adeberg	Germany	37.35	+1.02	
19	10	I	Dave Cruikshank	United States	37.37	+1.04	
20	20	O	Nate Mills	United States	37.41	+1.08	
21	8	I	Gerard van Velde	Netherlands	37.45	+1.12	
22	12	I	Roland Brunner	Austria	37.47	+1.14	
23	20	I	Oleh Kostromitin	Ukraine	37.50	+1.17	
24	11	O	Arie Loef	Netherlands	37.52	+1.19	
25	15	O	Hans Markström	Sweden	37.53	+1.20	
26	13	I	Mike Ireland	Canada	37.67	+1.34	
27	18	I	Dave Besteman	United States	37.68	+1.35	
28	10	O	Lars Funke	Germany	37.80	+1.47	
29	19	I	Alessandro De Taddei	Italy	37.87	+1.54	
30	13	O	Jaegal Sung-yeol	South Korea	37.90	+1.57	
31	19	O	Nico van der Vlies	Netherlands	37.94	+1.61	
32	17	O	Davide Carta	Italy	37.98	+1.65	
33	16	O	Vladimir Klepinin	Kazakhstan	38.09	+1.76	
34	16	I	Magnus Enfeldt	Sweden	38.10	+1.77	
34	18	O	Lee Jae-sik	South Korea	38.10	+1.77	
36	12	O	Lee Kyou-hyuk	South Korea	38.13	+1.80	
37	14	I	Arjan Schreuder	Netherlands	38.33	+2.00	
38	15	I	Zsolt Baló	Romania	38.56	+2.23	
39	17	I	Michael Spielmann	Germany	38.58	+2.25	
-	3	I	Roger Strøm	Norway	DNF		
