= Ski jumping at the 1994 Winter Olympics – Large hill individual =

Men's large hill individual at the XVII Olympic Winter Games
- Pictogram for ski jumping
- Venue: Lysgårdsbakken
- Dates: February 20, 1994
- Competitors: 58 from 19 nations
- winning score: 274.5

Medalists
1st place, gold medalist(s)		Jens Weißflog; Germany
2nd place, silver medalist(s)		Espen Bredesen; Norway
3rd place, bronze medalist(s)		Andreas Goldberger; Austria

The men's large hill individual ski jumping competition for the 1994 Winter Olympics was held in Lysgårdsbakken. It occurred on 20 February.

== Results ==
Rank	Bib	Athlete	Country	Jump 1	Jump 2	Total
1st place, gold medalist(s)	44	Jens Weißflog	Germany	134.1	140.4	274.5
2nd place, silver medalist(s)	56	Espen Bredesen	Norway	144.4	122.1	266.5
3rd place, bronze medalist(s)	32	Andreas Goldberger	Austria	133.8	121.2	255.0
4	20	Takanobu Okabe	Japan	110.6	132.9	243.5
5	41	Jani Soininen	Finland	109.6	121.5	231.1
6	39	Lasse Ottesen	Norway	109.6	117.0	226.6
7	49	Jaroslav Sakala	Czech Republic	113.1	108.9	222.0
8	33	Jinya Nishikata	Japan	120.8	97.5	218.3
9	51	Robert Meglič	Slovenia	114.1	103.4	217.5
10	55	Didier Mollard	France	117.7	95.6	213.3
11	24	Christof Duffner	Germany	120.5	92.5	213.0
12	52	Heinz Kuttin	Austria	103.4	104.0	207.4
13	5	Masahiko Harada	Japan	121.1	78.8	199.9
14	48	Noriaki Kasai	Japan	99.0	97.1	196.1
15	30	Dieter Thoma	Germany	102.0	90.7	192.7
16	46	Roberto Cecon	Italy	85.2	103.0	188.2
17	23	Øyvind Berg	Norway	99.6	87.4	187.0
18	26	Raimo Ylipulli	Finland	103.3	79.3	182.6
19	16	Stefan Horngacher	Austria	93.0	88.5	181.5
20	38	Ivan Lunardi	Italy	92.4	79.2	171.6
21	29	Nicolas Dessum	France	92.8	78.2	171.0
22	8	Ari-Pekka Nikkola	Finland	92.1	78.6	170.7
23	4	Steve Delaup	France	85.3	84.9	170.2
24	7	Hansjörg Jäkle	Germany	94.2	75.6	169.8
25	57	Janne Ahonen	Finland	90.3	73.1	163.4
26	9	Christian Moser	Austria	83.3	77.2	160.5
27	35	Matjaž Kladnik	Slovenia	85.4	69.7	155.1
28	45	Martin Švagerko	Slovakia	74.4	78.5	152.9
29	28	Zbyněk Krompolc	Czech Republic	90.2	61.2	151.4
30	19	Ladislav Dluhoš	Czech Republic	67.4	74.4	141.8
31	31	Wojciech Skupień	Poland	65.1	76.5	141.6
32	15	Ivo Pertile	Italy	72.0	68.9	140.9
33	22	Matjaž Zupan	Slovenia	67.5	72.9	140.4
34	53	Mikael Martinsson	Sweden	65.6	74.7	140.3
35	50	Ted Langlois	United States	71.6	63.6	135.2
36	58	Sylvain Freiholz	Switzerland	72.6	61.7	134.3
37	47	Andrey Verveykin	Kazakhstan	72.0	62.1	134.1
38	6	Franci Petek	Slovenia	69.5	62.7	132.2
39	3	Jiří Parma	Czech Republic	88.1	36.6	124.7
40	12	Fredrik Johansson	Sweden	68.4	54.9	123.3
41	1	Johan Rasmussen	Sweden	62.4	52.5	114.9
42	54	Mikhail Yesin	Russia	65.4	46.9	112.3
43	10	Stein Henrik Tuff	Norway	51.1	59.4	110.5
44	42	Stanislav Pokhilko	Russia	54.5	54.9	109.4
45	37	Miroslav Slušný	Slovakia	65.6	41.1	106.7
46	21	Jim Holland	United States	42.1	60.8	102.9
47	13	Nicolas Jean-Prost	France	26.4	70.7	97.1
48	36	Aleksandr Kolmakov	Kazakhstan	52.6	44.3	96.9
49	18	Dmitry Chelovenko	Russia	45.4	41.0	86.4
50	11	Bob Holme	United States	47.3	37.7	85.0
51	43	Martin Trunz	Switzerland	27.6	56.7	84.3
52	25	Vasyl Hrybovych	Ukraine	40.8	42.3	83.1
53	27	Randy Weber	United States	30.7	39.0	69.7
54	34	Aleksandr Sinyavsky	Belarus	22.7	46.9	69.6
55	14	Kakha Tsakadze	Georgia	28.5	34.4	62.9
56	40	Staffan Tällberg	Sweden	24.8	36.5	61.3
57	2	Aleksey Solodyankin	Russia	26.1	32.1	58.2
58	17	Kayrat Biekenov	Kazakhstan	7.3	27.9	35.2
