= Ski jumping at the 1994 Winter Olympics – Normal hill individual =

Men's normal hill individual at the XVII Olympic Winter Games
- Pictogram for ski jumping
- Venue: Lysgårdsbakken
- Dates: February 25, 1994
- Competitors: 58 from 19 nations
- winning score: 282.0

Medalists
1st place, gold medalist(s)		Espen Bredesen; Norway
2nd place, silver medalist(s)		Lasse Ottesen; Norway
3rd place, bronze medalist(s)		Dieter Thoma; Germany

The men's normal hill individual ski jumping competition for the 1994 Winter Olympics was held in Lysgårdsbakken. It occurred on 25 February.

== Results ==
				Round 1			Round 2			Total
Rank	Bib	Athlete	Country	Distance (m)	Points	Rank	Distance (m)	Points	Rank	Rank
1st place, gold medalist(s)	46	Espen Bredesen	Norway	100.5	140.5	1	104.0	141.5	1	282.0
2nd place, silver medalist(s)	29	Lasse Ottesen	Norway	102.5	137.5	2	98.0	130.5	4	268.0
3rd place, bronze medalist(s)	34	Dieter Thoma	Germany	98.5	127.5	7	102.5	133.0	2	260.5
4	55	Jens Weißflog	Germany	98.0	132.0	5	96.5	128.0	5	260.0
5	12	Noriaki Kasai	Japan	98.0	134.5	3	93.0	124.5	9	259.0
6	57	Jani Soininen	Finland	95.0	126.0	8	100.5	132.5	3	258.5
7	49	Andreas Goldberger	Austria	98.0	134.0	4	93.5	124.0	10	258.0
8	50	Jinya Nishikata	Japan	99.0	130.0	6	94.0	123.0	11	253.0
9	36	Takanobu Okabe	Japan	95.0	125.5	9	95.5	126.5	6	252.0
10	8	Christian Moser	Austria	92.0	121.0	14	95.0	125.0	8	246.0
11	10	Gerd Siegmund	Germany	94.5	123.5	11	92.0	119.5	12	243.0
12	23	Stefan Horngacher	Austria	94.5	124.0	10	94.5	118.5	15	242.5
13	53	Jaroslav Sakala	Czech Republic	86.5	109.0	30	94.5	126.0	7	235.0
14	18	Nicolas Dessum	France	95.5	123.5	11	88.0	109.5	23	233.0
14	47	Robert Meglič	Slovenia	93.0	121.0	14	88.5	112.0	21	233.0
16	9	Ari-Pekka Nikkola	Finland	90.0	116.0	19	89.0	115.0	17	231.0
17	54	Didier Mollard	France	91.5	115.5	20	90.0	114.5	18	230.0
18	26	Christof Duffner	Germany	88.5	110.5	29	92.5	119.0	14	229.5
19	33	Jiří Parma	Czech Republic	90.5	115.0	21	88.5	111.5	22	226.5
19	35	Matjaž Kladnik	Slovenia	92.5	119.0	17	87.5	107.5	25	226.5
19	48	Roberto Cecon	Italy	92.0	118.0	18	87.0	108.5	24	226.5
22	40	Nicolas Jean-Prost	France	89.5	111.0	28	89.0	113.5	20	224.5
23	58	Mikael Martinsson	Sweden	87.0	108.5	31	90.0	114.0	19	222.5
24	52	Andrey Verveykin	Kazakhstan	85.0	102.0	37	92.0	119.5	12	221.5
25	31	Heinz Kuttin	Austria	94.0	121.5	13	79.5	91.5	35	213.0
25	42	Sylvain Freiholz	Switzerland	89.5	114.5	22	82.0	98.5	29	213.0
25	56	Martin Švagerko	Slovakia	81.5	97.5	40	90.0	115.5	16	213.0
28	4	Samo Gostiša	Slovenia	86.5	105.5	36	85.5	104.5	27	210.0
29	38	Wojciech Skupień	Poland	84.5	100.5	39	86.5	106.0	26	206.5
30	41	Janne Väätäinen	Finland	89.5	113.0	23	80.5	93.0	33	206.0
31	13	Ivo Pertile	Italy	89.5	111.5	27	80.0	93.0	33	204.5
32	28	Ivan Lunardi	Italy	84.0	95.5	43	84.5	103.0	28	198.5
33	45	Ted Langlois	United States	87.5	108.5	31	78.0	88.5	37	197.0
34	30	Staffan Tällberg	Sweden	81.0	97.0	41	82.0	98.5	29	195.5
35	1	Bob Holme	United States	83.0	97.0	41	82.0	98.0	31	195.0
36	7	Zbyněk Krompolc	Czech Republic	86.0	106.0	35	75.5	83.5	41	189.5
37	20	Janne Ahonen	Finland	88.0	112.5	24	73.0	73.5	44	186.0
38	39	Aleksandr Sinyavsky	Belarus	81.0	93.5	44	76.5	85.5	39	179.0
39	3	Bjørn Myrbakken	Norway	87.0	106.5	34	84.5	71.0	47	177.5
40	27	Martin Trunz	Switzerland	88.5	112.5	24	68.5	62.5	51	175.0
41	16	Dejan Jekovec	Slovenia	74.0	79.0	55	82.0	95.0	32	174.0
41	44	Stanislav Pokhilko	Russia	81.0	93.5	44	74.0	80.5	42	174.0
43	24	Fredrik Johansson	Sweden	86.5	102.0	37	70.0	71.0	47	173.0
44	15	Randy Weber	United States	77.0	86.5	51	78.0	84.0	40	170.5
45	6	Aleksey Solodyankin	Russia	75.0	81.0	54	78.5	87.0	38	168.0
46	32	Aleksandr Kolmakov	Kazakhstan	78.5	89.5	48	73.5	76.0	43	165.5
47	5	Steve Delaup	France	74.5	73.0	56	79.0	89.5	36	162.5
48	43	Jim Holland	United States	77.5	85.0	52	71.0	73.0	45	158.0
49	14	Kayrat Biekenov	Kazakhstan	79.0	91.0	47	69.0	66.5	50	157.5
50	22	Kakha Tsakadze	Georgia	75.5	83.5	53	71.0	73.0	45	156.5
51	37	Miroslav Slušný	Slovakia	80.5	92.0	46	66.5	60.0	52	152.0
52	19	Øyvind Berg	Norway	89.0	112.5	24	59.0	37.0	55	149.5
53	11	Magnus Westman	Sweden	78.5	88.5	49	67.5	59.5	53	148.0
54	17	Dmitry Chelovenko	Russia	68.0	66.0	57	72.5	70.5	49	136.5
55	2	Masahiko Harada	Japan	92.0	120.5	16	54.5	5.0	56	125.5
56	25	Vasyl Hrybovych	Ukraine	64.0	56.0	58	59.0	46.0	54	102.0
	21	Ladislav Dluhoš	Czech Republic	86.5	108.5	31				DSQ
	51	Mikhail Yesin	Russia	79.5	87.0	50				DSQ
