= Slovenia at the 1994 Winter Olympics =

- IOC code: SLO
- NOC: Olympic Committee of Slovenia
- Website: www.olympic.si (in Slovene and English)

in Lillehammer
- Competitors: 22 (17 men, 5 women) in 3 sports
- Flag bearer: Jure Košir (alpine skiing)
- Medals Ranked 20th: Gold 0 Silver 0 Bronze 3 Total 3

Winter Olympics appearances (overview)
- 1992; 1994; 1998; 2002; 2006; 2010; 2014; 2018; 2022; 2026

Other related appearances
- Yugoslavia (1924–1988)

Slovenia participated at the 1994 Winter Olympics held between 12 and 27 February 1994 in Lillehammer, Norway. The country's participation in the Games marked its second appearance at the Winter Olympics since its debut in the 1992 Games. The Slovenian team consisted of 22 athletes who competed across three sports. Jure Košir served as the country's flag-bearer during the opening ceremony. Slovenia was ranked 20th in the overall medal table with three bronze medals.

== Background ==
SLovenian athletes competed as a part of Yugoslavia till 1988. The National Olympic Committee of Slovenia was founded on 15 October 1991. The Olympic Committee of Slovenia was provisionally granted approval by the International Olympic Committee (IOC) on 17 January 1992 and was fully recognized on 5 February 1992. The 1992 Winter Olympics marked Slovenia's first participation in the Winter Olympics. After the nation made its debut in the Winter Olympics at the 1992 Games, this edition of the Games in 1994 marked the nation's second appearance at the Winter Games.

The 1994 Winter Olympics was held between 12 and 27 February 1994 in Lillehammer, Norway. The Slovenian team consisted of 22 athletes who competed across three sports. Jure Košir served as the country's flag-bearer during the opening ceremony.

== Medalists ==
Slovenia was ranked 20th in the overall medal table with three bronze medals.

Medal	Name	Sport	Event	Date
Bronze	Alenka Dovžan	Alpine skiing	Women's combined	21 February
Bronze	Katja Koren	Alpine skiing	Women's slalom	26 February
Bronze	Jure Košir	Alpine skiing	Men's slalom	27 February

== Competitors ==
The Slovenian team consisted of 22 athletes including five women who competed across three sports.

Sport	Men	Women	Total
Alpine skiing	6	4	10
Biathlon	5	1	6
Ski jumping	6	0	6
Total	17	5	22

== Alpine skiing ==
Alpine skiing competitions were held at Kvitfjell Alpinsenter, Ringebu. Ten athletes including four women participated across the ten events in alpine skiing. Slovenia won all the three bronze medals in the current Games in the alpine skiing competitions. While Jure Košir won the bronze medal in the men's slalom event, Katja Koren and Alenka Dovžan won bronze medals in the women's slalom and combined events respectively.

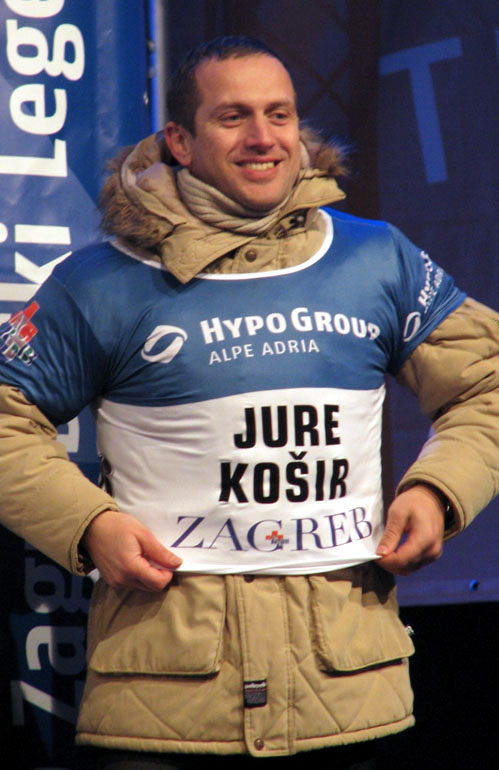
Jure Košir won the bronze medal in the men's slalom event

Men

Athlete	Event	Race 1	Race 2	Total	
Athlete	Event	Time	Time	Time	Rank
Miran Ravter	Downhill	—		1:48.48	35
Jernej Koblar	Super-G	—		1:35.16	29
Mitja Kunc	Super-G	—		1:35.15	28
Miran Ravter	Super-G	—		1:34.73	22
Gregor Grilc	Giant slalom	1:31.38	1:25.75	2:57.13	24
Jure Košir	Giant slalom	1:31.30	1:25.80	2:57.10	23
Jernej Koblar	Giant slalom	1:30.75	1:25.92	2:56.67	22
Mitja Kunc	Giant slalom	1:28.90	1:25.17	2:54.07	14
Andrej Miklavc	Slalom	1:02.57	1:01.78	2:04.35	10
Gregor Grilc	Slalom	DSQ	–	DSQ	–
Jure Košir	Slalom	1:02.55	59.98	2:02.53	3rd place, bronze medalist(s)
Mitja Kunc	Slalom	1:02.82	59.80	2:02.62	4

Athlete	Event	Downhill	Slalom		Total	
Athlete	Event	Time	Time 1	Time 2	Time	Rank
Gregor Grilc	Combined	1:45.61	50.97	49.45	3:26.03	23
Jure Košir	Combined	1:42.17	50.23	48.18	3:20.58	10
Mitja Kunc	Combined	1:40.01	50.88	48.66	3:19.55	7
Miran Ravter	Combined	1:38.88	52.46	49.34	3:20.68	11

Women

Athlete	Event	Race 1	Race 2	Total	
Athlete	Event	Time	Time	Time	Rank
Alenka Dovžan	Downhill	—		1:38.07	16
Katja Koren	Downhill	—		1:37.69	10
Špela Pretnar	Downhill	—		1:38.50	23
Alenka Dovžan	Super-G	—		DNF	–
Katja Koren	Super-G	—		1:22.96	7
Špela Pretnar	Super-G	—		DNF	–
Urška Hrovat	Super-G	—		1:24.49	26
Alenka Dovžan	Giant slalom	1:22.66	DNF	DNF	–
Katja Koren	Giant slalom	DNF	–	DNF	–
Špela Pretnar	Giant slalom	1:22.81	1:13.30	2:36.11	12
Urška Hrovat	Giant slalom	1:23.61	1:14.55	2:38.16	20
Alenka Dovžan	Slalom	DNF	–	DNF	–
Katja Koren	Slalom	59.00	57.61	1:56.61	3rd place, bronze medalist(s)
Špela Pretnar	Slalom	1:00.78	57.87	1:58.65	11
Urška Hrovat	Slalom	1:00.38	57.69	1:58.07	8

Athlete	Event	Downhill	Slalom		Total	
Athlete	Event	Time	Time 1	Time 2	Time	Rank
Alenka Dovžan	Combined	1:28.67	50.01	47.96	3:06.64	3rd place, bronze medalist(s)
Katja Koren	Combined	1:30.59	50.28	48.72	3:09.59	6
Špela Pretnar	Combined	1:29.91	DNF	–	DNF	–
Urška Hrovat	Combined	1:34.60	51.72	48.43	3:14.75	14

== Biathlon ==
Biathlon competitions were held at Birkebeineren Skistadion, Lillehammer. Six Slovenian athletes participated across the five events in biathlon. The biathlon events consisted of a skiing a specific course multiple times depending on the length of the competition, with intermediate shooting at various positions. For every shot missed, a penalty of one minute is applied in individual events, and the participant is required to ski through a penalty loop in sprint events. Janez Ožbolt registered the best finish amongst the men's team, with a top ten finish in the sprint event. Andreja Grašič was the lone woman participant from the nation in the event.

Athlete	Event	Time	Misses ^{1}	Adjusted Time ^{2}	Rank
Janez Ožbolt	Men's 10 km sprint	29:35.8	0	—	9
Jože Poklukar	Men's 10 km sprint	32:31.7	3	—	59
Uroš Velepec	Men's 10 km sprint	31:07.5	2	—	36
Boštjan Lekan	Men's 20 km	1'00:12.3	5	1'05:12.3	59
Janez Ožbolt	Men's 20 km	58:19.1	3	1'01:19.1	29
Jure Velepec	Men's 20 km	59:58.0	2	1'01:58.0	38
Boštjan Lekan; Janez Ožbolt; Jure Velepec; Uroš Velepec	Men's relay	1'34:19.6	1	—	10
Andreja Grašič	Women's sprint	27:17.9	3	—	18
Andreja Grašič	Women's 15 km	50:09.3	9	59:09.3	44

^{1} A penalty loop of 150 metres had to be skied per missed target.
^{2} One minute added per missed target.

== Ski jumping ==
Ski jumping competitions were held at Lysgårdsbakkene, Lillehammer. Six Slovenian athletes participated across the three events in Ski jumping. Robert Meglič recorded the only top ten result in the individual events. In the team event, where each of the four member team did two jumps, the Slovenian team finished ninth with a combined tally of 739.4 points.

Athlete	Event	Jump 1		Jump 2		Total	
Athlete	Event	Distance	Points	Distance	Points	Points	Rank
Dejan Jekovec	Normal hill	74.0	79.0	82.0	95.0	174.0	41
Matjaž Kladnik	Normal hill	92.5	119.0	87.5	107.5	226.5	19
Robert Meglič	Normal hill	93.0	121.0	88.5	112.0	233.0	14
Samo Gostiša	Normal hill	86.5	105.5	85.5	104.5	210.0	28
Franci Petek	Large hill	95.0	69.5	91.5	62.7	132.2	38
Matjaž Kladnik	Large hill	105.5	85.4	96.5	69.7	155.1	27
Matjaž Zupan	Large hill	95.0	67.5	98.0	72.9	155.1	27
Robert Meglič	Large hill	122.0	114.1	113.0	103.4	217.5	9
Matjaž Kladnik; Matjaž Zupan; Robert Meglič; Samo Gostiša	Large hill team^{1}	—				739.4	9

^{1} Four teams members performed two jumps each.
