= Austria at the 1994 Winter Olympics =

- IOC code: AUT
- NOC: Austrian Olympic Committee
- Website: www.olympia.at (in German)

in Lillehammer
- Competitors: 80 (65 men, 15 women) in 10 sports
- Flag bearer: Anita Wachter (alpine skiing)
- Medals Ranked 9th: Gold 2 Silver 3 Bronze 4 Total 9

Winter Olympics appearances (overview)
- 1924; 1928; 1932; 1936; 1948; 1952; 1956; 1960; 1964; 1968; 1972; 1976; 1980; 1984; 1988; 1992; 1994; 1998; 2002; 2006; 2010; 2014; 2018; 2022; 2026

Austria competed at the 1994 Winter Olympics in Lillehammer, Norway.

== Medalists ==
| Medal | Name | Sport | Event | Date |
|---|---|---|---|---|
| Gold | Emese Hunyady | Speed skating | Women's 1500 metres | 21 February |
| Gold | Thomas Stangassinger | Alpine skiing | Men's slalom | 27 February |
| Silver | Markus Prock | Luge | Men's singles | 14 February |
| Silver | Emese Hunyady | Speed skating | Women's 3000 metres | 17 February |
| Silver | Elfi Eder | Alpine skiing | Women's slalom | 26 February |
| Bronze | Andrea Tagwerker | Luge | Women's singles | 16 February |
| Bronze | Andreas Goldberger | Ski jumping | Large hill individual | 20 February |
| Bronze | Heinz Kuttin; Christian Moser; Stefan Horngacher; Andreas Goldberger | Ski jumping | Large hill team | 22 February |
| Bronze | Christian Mayer | Alpine skiing | Men's giant slalom | 23 February |

== Competitors ==
The following is the list of number of competitors in the Games.

| Sport | Men | Women | Total |
|---|---|---|---|
| Alpine skiing | 10 | 10 | 20 |
| Biathlon | 5 | 0 | 5 |
| Bobsleigh | 9 | – | 9 |
| Cross-country skiing | 1 | 0 | 1 |
| Freestyle skiing | 1 | 0 | 1 |
| Ice hockey | 23 | – | 23 |
| Luge | 5 | 3 | 8 |
| Nordic combined | 4 | – | 4 |
| Ski jumping | 4 | – | 4 |
| Speed skating | 3 | 2 | 5 |
| Total | 65 | 15 | 80 |

== Alpine skiing ==
Men

| Athlete | Event | Final | | | | |
| Athlete | Event | Run 1 | Run 2 | Run 3 | Total | Rank |
|---|---|---|---|---|---|---|
| Armin Assinger | Downhill | | | | 1:46.68 | 15 |
| Armin Assinger | Super-G | | | | 1:33.84 | 11 |
| Bernhard Gstrein | Giant slalom | 1:29.13 | 1:24.22 | | 2:53.35 | 8 |
| Bernhard Gstrein | Slalom | DNF | | | DNF | |
| Hans Knauß | Super-G | | | | 1:34.65 | 20 |
| Hans Knauß | Combined | DNF | | | DNF | |
| Günther Mader | Downhill | | | | 1:46.87 | 19 |
| Günther Mader | Super-G | | | | 1:33.50 | 9 |
| Günther Mader | Giant slalom | 1:29.37 | 1:24.29 | | 2:53.66 | 11 |
| Günther Mader | Slalom | DNF | | | DNF | |
| Günther Mader | Combined | 1:38.46 | 52.15 | 48.62 | 3:19.23 | 4 |
| Christian Mayer | Giant slalom | 1:28.34 | 1:24.24 | | 2:52.58 | Bronze |
| Christian Mayer | Combined | 1:39.86 | DNF | | DNF | |
| Patrick Ortlieb | Downhill | | | | 1:46.01 | 4 |
| Rainer Salzgeber | Giant slalom | 1:29.51 | 1:23.36 | | 2:52.87 | 5 |
| Thomas Stangassinger | Slalom | 1:01.00 | 1:01.02 | | 2:02.02 | Gold |
| Thomas Sykora | Slalom | 1:02.03 | DNF | | DNF | |
| Hannes Trinkl | Downhill | | | | 1:46.22 | 6 |
| Hannes Trinkl | Super-G | | | | DNF | |

Women

| Athlete | Event | Final | | | | |
| Athlete | Event | Run 1 | Run 2 | Run 3 | Total | Rank |
|---|---|---|---|---|---|---|
| Elfi Eder | Slalom | 59.54 | 56.81 | | 1:56.35 | Silver |
| Sylvia Eder | Super-G | | | | 1:23.51 | 15 |
| Sylvia Eder | Giant slalom | 1:23.03 | 1:13.45 | | 2:36.48 | 14 |
| Renate Götschl | Downhill | | | | DNF | |
| Anja Haas | Downhill | | | | 1:38.98 | 31 |
| Anja Haas | Combined | 1:30.01 | DNF | | DNF | |
| Monika Maierhofer | Slalom | 1:01.05 | 57.69 | | 1:58.74 | 12 |
| Alexandra Meissnitzer | Giant slalom | DNF | | | DNF | |
| Stefanie Schuster | Super-G | | | | 1:24.76 | 30 |
| Veronika Stallmaier | Downhill | | | | 1:37.94 | 14 |
| Veronika Stallmaier | Super-G | | | | 1:23.83 | 22 |
| Ingrid Stöckl | Downhill | | | | DNF | |
| Ingrid Stöckl | Combined | 1:29.97 | DQ | | DQ | |
| Anita Wachter | Super-G | | | | 1:23.01 | 9 |
| Anita Wachter | Giant slalom | 1:21.18 | 1:11.88 | | 2:33.06 | 4 |
| Anita Wachter | Slalom | DNF | | | DNF | |

== Biathlon ==
Men

| Athlete | Event | Final | | |
| Athlete | Event | Time | Pen. | Rank |
|---|---|---|---|---|
| Alfred Eder | 20 km Individual | 59:43.9 | 0 | 10 |
| Ludwig Gredler | 10 km Sprint | 29:05.4 | 2 | 5 |
| Ludwig Gredler | 20 km Individual | 1:00:21.6 | 5 | 18 |
| Wolfgang Perner | 10 km Sprint | 30:31.5 | 3 | 22 |
| Martin Pfurtscheller | 10 km Sprint | 31:47.2 | 5 | 43 |
| Martin Pfurtscheller | 20 km Individual | 1:03:56.3 | 7 | 57 |
| Franz Schuler | 10 km Sprint | 30:55.2 | 4 | 30 |
| Franz Schuler | 20 km Individual | 1:03:01.4 | 7 | 48 |
| Wolfgang Perner; Ludwig Gredler; Franz Schuler; Martin Pfurtscheller | 4 × 7.5 km relay | 1:34:02.9 | 4 | 9 |

== Bobsleigh ==
| Athlete | Event | Final | | | | | |
| Athlete | Event | Run 1 | Run 2 | Run 3 | Run 4 | Total | Rank |
|---|---|---|---|---|---|---|---|
| Kurt Einberger; Martin Schützenauer | Two-man | 53.13 | 53.63 | 53.32 | 53.61 | 3:33.69 | 17 |
| Hubert Schösser; Thomas Schroll | Two-man | 52.71 | 53.02 | 52.94 | 53.26 | 3:31.93 | 5 |
| Kurt Einberger; Thomas Bachler; Carsten Nentwig; Martin Schützenauer | Four-man | 51.94 | 52.22 | 52.32 | 52.43 | 3:28.91 | 6 |
| Hubert Schösser; Gerhard Redl; Harald Winkler; Gerhard Haidacher | Four-man | 51.76 | 52.04 | 52.23 | 52.37 | 3:28.40 | 4 |

== Cross-country skiing ==
Men

| Athlete | Event | Final | | | | | |
| Athlete | Event | Start | Rank | Time | Rank | Total | Rank |
|---|---|---|---|---|---|---|---|
| Alois Stadlober | 10 km Classical | | | | | 25:25.4 | 10 |
| Alois Stadlober | 15 km Free Pursuit | +01:05 | 10 | 37:32.1 | 13 | +2:48.3 | 11 |
| Alois Stadlober | 50 km Classical | | | | | 2:13:13.5 | 15 |

== Freestyle skiing ==
Men

| Athlete | Event | Qualifying | | Final | |
| Athlete | Event | Points | Rank | Points | Rank |
|---|---|---|---|---|---|
| Christian Rijavec | Aerials | 186.11 | 14 | Did Not Advance | |

== Ice hockey ==
=== Men's team competition ===
- Team roster
  - Michael Puschacher
  - Brian Stankiewicz
  - Claus Dalpiaz
  - Martin Krainz
  - Jim Burton
  - Engelbert Linder
  - Mike Shea
  - Rob Doyle
  - Herbert Hohenberger
  - Michael Güntner
  - Martin Ulrich
  - Karl Heinzle
  - Andreas Pusnik
  - Marty Dallman
  - Gerhard Pusnik
  - Manfred Mühr
  - Rick Nasheim
  - Günther Lanzinger
  - Gerald Ressmann
  - Ken Strong
  - Werner Kerth
  - Wolfgang Kromp
  - Dieter Kalt
- Head coach: Ken Tyler

Results

| Stage | Opponent | Result | Points | Rank |
|---|---|---|---|---|
| Group stage | Germany | 3-4 | | |
| Group stage | Czech Republic | 3-7 | | |
| Group stage | Russia | 1-9 | | |
| Group stage | Finland | 2-6 | | |
| Group stage | Norway | 4-2 | | |
| Group stage | | 13–28 | 2 | 5 |
| Placement round 9–12 | France | 4-5 | | |
| 11th-place match | Norway | 1-3 | | 12 |

== Luge ==
Men

| Athlete | Event | Final | | | | | |
| Athlete | Event | Run 1 | Run 2 | Run 3 | Run 4 | Total | Rank |
|---|---|---|---|---|---|---|---|
| Gerhard Gleirscher | Singles | 50.857 | 50.811 | 50.352 | 50.549 | 3:22.569 | 7 |
| Markus Prock | Singles | 50.300 | 50.566 | 50.166 | 50.552 | 3:21.584 | Silver |
| Tobias Schiegl; Markus Schiegl | Doubles | 48.802 | 48.893 | | | 1:37.695 | 10 |
| Markus Schmidt | Singles | 50.664 | 50.870 | 50.750 | 50.830 | 3:23.114 | 10 |

Women

| Athlete | Event | Final | | | | | |
| Athlete | Event | Run 1 | Run 2 | Run 3 | Run 4 | Total | Rank |
|---|---|---|---|---|---|---|---|
| Angelika Neuner | Singles | 49.055 | 49.152 | 49.315 | 49.379 | 3:16.901 | 4 |
| Doris Neuner | Singles | 49.331 | 49.717 | 49.319 | 49.459 | 3:17.826 | 10 |
| Andrea Tagwerker | Singles | 48.961 | 49.157 | 49.277 | 49.257 | 3:16.652 | Bronze |

== Nordic combined ==
| Athlete | Event | First Round | | Second Round | | | Cross-country | | | | |
| Athlete | Event | Points | Rank | Points | Total | Rank | Start | Time | Rank | Total | Rank |
|---|---|---|---|---|---|---|---|---|---|---|---|
| Felix Gottwald | Individual event | 101.5 | 21 | 89.0 | 190.5 | 32 | +06:16 | 41:26.1 | 34 | 47:42.1 | 37 |
| Georg Riedlsperger | Individual event | 90.0 | 43 | 103.0 | 193.0 | 26 | +06:00 | 43:00.2 | 44 | 49:00.2 | 40 |
| Robert Stadelmann | Individual event | 102.0 | 20 | 88.5 | 190.5 | 32 | +06:16 | 43:07.6 | 45 | 49:23.6 | 41 |
| Mario Stecher | Individual event | 99.0 | 26 | 112.0 | 211.0 | 11 | +04:00 | 43:09.2 | 47 | 47:09.2 | 27 |
| Georg Riedelsperger; Mario Stecher; Felix Gottwald | Team event | 322.0 | 4 | 287.0 | 609.0 | 5 | +10:22 | 1:27:47.5 | 10 | 1:38:09.5 | 9 |

== Ski jumping ==
| Athlete | Event | First Round | | Final | | |
| Athlete | Event | Points | Rank | Points | Total | Rank |
|---|---|---|---|---|---|---|
| Andreas Goldberger | Large hill | 133.8 | 3 | 121.2 | 255.0 | Bronze |
| Andreas Goldberger | Normal hill | 134.0 | 4 | 124.0 | 258.0 | 7 |
| Stefan Horngacher | Large hill | 93.0 | 19 | 88.5 | 181.5 | 19 |
| Stefan Horngacher | Normal hill | 124.0 | 10 | 118.5 | 242.5 | 12 |
| Heinz Kuttin | Large hill | 103.4 | 13 | 104.0 | 207.4 | 12 |
| Heinz Kuttin | Normal hill | 114.5 | 22 | 98.5 | 213.0 | 25 |
| Christian Moser | Large hill | 83.3 | 29 | 77.2 | 160.5 | 26 |
| Christian Moser | Normal hill | 121.0 | 14 | 125.0 | 246.0 | 10 |
| Andreas Goldberger; Stefan Horngacher; Heinz Kuttin; Christian Moser | Team Large Hill | 472.0 | 3 | 446.9 | 918.9 | Bronze |

== Speed skating ==
Men

| Athlete | Event | Final | |
| Athlete | Event | Time | Rank |
|---|---|---|---|
| Roland Brunner | 500 metres | 37.47 | 22 |
| Roland Brunner | 1000 metres | 1:14.08 | 12 |
| Roland Brunner | 1500 metres | 1:55.78 | 22 |
| Christian Eminger | 5000 metres | 6:53.18 | 10 |
| Christian Eminger | 10000 metres | 14:15.14 | 10 |
| Michael Hadschieff | 1500 metres | 1:55.09 | 17 |
| Michael Hadschieff | 5000 metres | 6:53.02 | 9 |
| Michael Hadschieff | 10000 metres | 14:12.09 | 9 |

Women

| Athlete | Event | Final | |
| Athlete | Event | Time | Rank |
|---|---|---|---|
| Emese Antal | 500 metres | 41.59 | 27 |
| Emese Antal | 1000 metres | 1:22.34 | 22 |
| Emese Antal | 1500 metres | 2:07.72 | 19 |
| Emese Antal | 3000 metres | 4:27.91 | 13 |
| Emese Antal | 5000 metres | 7:46.78 | 15 |
| Emese Hunyady | 1000 metres | 1:20.42 | 7 |
| Emese Hunyady | 1500 metres | 2:02.19 | Gold |
| Emese Hunyady | 3000 metres | 4:18.14 | Silver |
| Emese Hunyady | 5000 metres | 7:38.62 | 12 |

== Sources ==
- Official Olympic Reports
- International Olympic Committee results database
