= Nadezhda Talanova =

Russian biathlete

Medal record

Representing Russia

Women's biathlon

Olympic Games
Gold medal – first place	1994 Lillehammer	4 x 7.5 km relay

Nadezhda Aleksandrovna Talanova (Russian: Надежда Александровна Таланова; born 17 April 1967, in Udmurtia) is a Russian biathlete. At the 1994 Winter Olympics in Lillehammer, she won a gold medal with the Russian relay team, which consisted of herself, Natalya Snytina, Luiza Noskova and Anfisa Reztsova.
