= Ski jumping at the 1994 Winter Olympics =

Ski jumping at the XVII Olympic Winter Games
- Venue: Lysgårdsbakken
- Dates: 20–25 February 1994
- No. of events: 3
- Competitors: 68 from 19 nations

Ski jumping at the 1994 Winter Olympics consisted of three events held from 20 February to 25 February, taking place at Lysgårdsbakken.

== Medal summary ==
=== Medal table ===
Rank	Nation	Gold	Silver	Bronze	Total
1	Germany	2	0	1	3
2	Norway	1	2	0	3
3	Japan	0	1	0	1
4	Austria	0	0	2	2
Totals (4 entries)		3	3	3	9

Germany led the medal table with two gold medals, and three overall.

=== Events ===
Event	Gold		Silver		Bronze	
Normal hill individual	Espen Bredesen; Norway	282.0	Lasse Ottesen; Norway	268.0	Dieter Thoma; Germany	260.5
Large hill individual	Jens Weißflog; Germany	274.5	Espen Bredesen; Norway	266.5	Andreas Goldberger; Austria	255.0
Large hill team	Germany; Hansjörg Jäkle; Christof Duffner; Dieter Thoma; Jens Weißflog	970.1	Japan; Jinya Nishikata; Takanobu Okabe; Noriaki Kasai; Masahiko Harada	956.9	Austria; Heinz Kuttin; Christian Moser; Stefan Horngacher; Andreas Goldberger	918.9

== Participating NOCs ==
Nineteen nations participated in ski jumping at the Lillehammer Games. Belarus, the Czech Republic, Georgia, Kazakhstan, Russia, Slovakia and Ukraine made their Olympic ski jumping debuts.

- Austria (4)
- Belarus (1)
- Czech Republic (4)
- Finland (5)
- France (4)
- Georgia (1)
- Germany (5)
- Italy (4)
- Japan (4)
- Kazakhstan (3)
- Norway (6)
- Poland (1)
- Russia (4)
- Slovenia (6)
- Switzerland (2)
- Slovakia (2)
- Sweden (5)
- Ukraine (1)
- United States (6)
