= Kayrat Biekenov =

Kazakhstani ski jumper (born 1972)

Personal information
- Nationality: Kazakhstani
- Born: 25 May 1972 (age 52)

Sport
- Sport: Ski jumping

Kayrat Biekenov (born 25 May 1972) is a Kazakhstani former ski jumper. He competed in the normal hill and large hill events at the 1994 Winter Olympics.
