= Brendan Eppert =

American speed skater

Personal information
- Born: February 10, 1970 (age 56) St. Louis, Missouri, United States

Sport
- Sport: Speed skating

Brendan Eppert (born February 10, 1970) is an American speed skater. He competed in the men's 1000 metres event at the 1994 Winter Olympics.
