= Miroslav Slušný =

Slovak ski jumper

Personal information
- Nationality: Slovak
- Born: 31 May 1964 (age 60); Ružomberok, Czechoslovakia

Sport
- Sport: Ski jumping

Miroslav Slušný (born 31 May 1964) is a Slovak ski jumper. He competed in the normal hill and large hill events at the 1994 Winter Olympics.
