= Biathlon at the 1994 Winter Olympics =

Biathlon at the XVII Olympic Winter Games
- Venue: Birkebeineren Ski Stadium
- Dates: 18–26 February
- No. of events: 6
- Competitors: 193 from 32 nations

The biathlon competition at the 1994 Winter Olympics were held at the Birkebeineren Ski Stadium. The events were held between 18 and 26 February 1994.

The sport of biathlon combines the skills of cross-country skiing and rifle shooting. Men and women competed in three events. The biathlon program remained unchanged except for the women's relay distance from 3 x 7.5 km to 4 x 7.5 km.

== Medal summary ==
Six nations won medals in biathlon, with Russia leading the medal table (3 gold, 1 silver, 1 bronze), and Germany winning the most total medals with six. Sergei Tarasov was the only individual to win three medals, while Myriam Bédard led the individual medal table with two gold medals.

Bédard's pair of gold medals were the first won an athlete from outside Europe or the Soviet Union. In addition, Valentina Tserbe-Nessina became the first Olympic medalist from Ukraine, and Svetlana Paramygina became the first female Olympic medalist from Belarus, as those countries made their Olympic debuts.

=== Medal table ===
Rank	Nation	Gold	Silver	Bronze	Total
1	Russia	3	1	1	5
2	Canada	2	0	0	2
3	Germany	1	3	2	6
4	France	0	1	2	3
5	Belarus	0	1	0	1
6	Ukraine	0	0	1	1
Totals (6 entries)		6	6	6	18

=== Men's events ===
Event	Gold		Silver		Bronze	
Individual	Sergei Tarasov; Russia	57:25.3	Frank Luck; Germany	57:28.7	Sven Fischer; Germany	57:41.9
Sprint	Sergei Tchepikov; Russia	28:07.0	Ricco Groß; Germany	28:13.0	Sergei Tarasov; Russia	28:27.4
Relay	Germany; Ricco Groß; Frank Luck; Mark Kirchner; Sven Fischer	1:30:22.1	Russia; Valeri Kiriyenko; Vladimir Drachev; Sergei Tarasov; Sergei Tchepikov	1:31:23.6	France; Thierry Dusserre; Patrice Bailly-Salins; Lionel Laurent; Hervé Flandin	1:32:31.3

=== Women's events ===
Event	Gold		Silver		Bronze	
Individual	Myriam Bédard; Canada	52:06.6	Anne Briand; France	52:53.3	Uschi Disl; Germany	53:15.3
Sprint	Myriam Bédard; Canada	26:08.8	Svetlana Paramygina; Belarus	26:09.9	Valentina Tserbe-Nessina; Ukraine	26:10.0
Relay	Russia; Nadezhda Talanova; Natalya Snytina; Luiza Noskova; Anfisa Reztsova	1:47:19.5	Germany; Uschi Disl; Antje Harvey; Simone Greiner-Petter-Memm; Petra Schaaf	1:51:16.5	France; Corinne Niogret; Véronique Claudel; Delphyne Heymann; Anne Briand	1:52:28.3

== Participating nations ==
Thirty-two nations sent biathletes to compete in the events. Below is a list of the competing nations; in parentheses are the number of national competitors.

- Argentina (1)
- Australia (2)
- Austria (5)
- Belarus (11)
- Bulgaria (5)
- Canada (7)
- China (4)
- Czech Republic (10)
- Estonia (9)
- Finland (9)
- France (11)
- Great Britain (4)
- Germany (9)
- Greece (1)
- Hungary (5)
- Italy (6)
- Japan (2)
- Kazakhstan (2)
- Kyrgyzstan (1)
- Latvia (5)
- Lithuania (2)
- Moldova (2)
- Norway (11)
- Poland (10)
- Romania (5)
- Russia (10)
- Slovenia (6)
- Switzerland (3)
- Slovakia (6)
- Sweden (10)
- Ukraine (10)
- United States (9)

== See also ==
- Biathlon at the 1994 Winter Paralympics
