= Vasyl Hrybovych =

Ukrainian ski jumper

Personal information
- Nationality: Ukrainian
- Born: 23 January 1970 (age 55)

Sport
- Sport: Ski jumping

Vasyl Hrybovych (born 23 January 1970) is a Ukrainian ski jumper. He competed in the normal hill and large hill events at the 1994 Winter Olympics.
