= Lars Funke =

German speed skater (born 1972)

Personal information
- Nationality: German
- Born: 28 January 1972 (age 53); Erfurt, East Germany

Sport
- Sport: Speed skating

Lars Funke (born 28 January 1972) is a German speed skater. He competed in two events at the 1994 Winter Olympics.
