= Dmitry Denisov =

Russian ice hockey player

Personal information
- Nationality: Russian
- Born: 5 July 1970 (age 56) Ufa, RSFSR, USSR

Sport
- Sport: Ice hockey

Dmitry Vitalievich Denisov (Russian: Дмитрий Витальевич Денисов; born 5 July 1970) is a Russian ice hockey player. He competed in the men's tournament at the 1994 Winter Olympics.

== Career statistics ==
=== Regular season and playoffs ===
			Regular season					Playoffs
Season	Team	League	GP	G	A	Pts	PIM	GP	G	A	Pts	PIM
1987–88	Salavat Yulaev Ufa	URS.2	62	13	7	20	18	—	—	—	—	—
1988–89	Salavat Yulaev Ufa	URS.2	54	7	0	7	14	—	—	—	—	—
1989–90	Avangard Ufa	URS.3	35	14	5	19	29	—	—	—	—	—
1990–91	Salavat Yulaev Ufa	URS.2	68	23	12	35	50	—	—	—	—	—
1991–92	Salavat Yulaev Ufa	CIS.2	56	19	10	29	20	—	—	—	—	—
1992–93	Salavat Yulaev Ufa	IHL	42	18	7	25	16	2	2	0	2	0
1993–94	Salavat Yulaev Ufa	IHL	43	40	19	59	16	5	3	1	4	0
1994–95	Salavat Yulaev Ufa	IHL	52	43	17	60	22	7	3	1	4	0
1995–96	HC Ambrì–Piotta	NDA	6	2	2	4	0	1	0	0	0	0
1996–97	Brynäs IF	SEL	45	26	12	38	34	—	—	—	—	—
1997–98	HC Chemopetrol, a.s.	ELH	39	8	9	17	26	3	1	0	1	4
1998–99	Salavat Yulaev Ufa	RSL	40	17	14	31	30	4	1	1	2	2
1999–2000	Severstal Cherepovets	RSL	35	10	9	19	20	5	1	3	4	0
2000–01	Severstal Cherepovets	RSL	44	9	9	18	24	9	2	3	5	6
2001–02	Severstal Cherepovets	RSL	50	12	10	22	47	4	0	0	0	2
2002–03	Molot–Prikamie Perm	RSL	16	1	3	4	14	—	—	—	—	—
2002–03	Krylya Sovetov Moscow	RSL	9	0	0	0	14	—	—	—	—	—
2003–04	Mechel Chelyabinsk	RUS.2	47	9	19	28	60	12	5	2	7	6
2004–05	Mechel Chelyabinsk	RUS.2	50	15	28	43	46	—	—	—	—	—
2005–06	Gazovik Tyumen	RUS.2	25	9	9	18	18	3	0	1	1	2
2005–06	Gazovik Univer	RUS.3	2	1	3	4	2	—	—	—	—	—
2006–07	Gazovik Tyumen	RUS.2	24	2	7	9	24	—	—	—	—	—
2006–07	Toros Neftekamsk	RUS.2	24	3	8	11	22	—	—	—	—	—
2007–08	Toros Neftekamsk	RUS.2	50	7	14	21	46	4	0	1	1	2
URS.2/CIS.2 totals			278	65	33	98	114	—	—	—	—	—
IHL totals			143	101	43	144	54	14	8	2	10	0
RSL totals			188	49	45	94	149	22	4	7	11	10

=== International ===
Year	Team	Event	GP	G	A	Pts	PIM
1994	Russia	OG	8	3	1	4	4
Senior totals			8	3	1	4	4
