= Engelbert Linder =

Austrian ice hockey player

Personal information
- Nationality: Austrian
- Born: 18 July 1962 (age 63) Villach, Austria

Sport
- Sport: Ice hockey

Engelbert Linder (born 18 July 1962) is an Austrian ice hockey player. He competed in the men's tournaments at the 1994 Winter Olympics and the 1998 Winter Olympics.
