= Ravil Gusmanov =

Russian ice hockey player (born 1972)

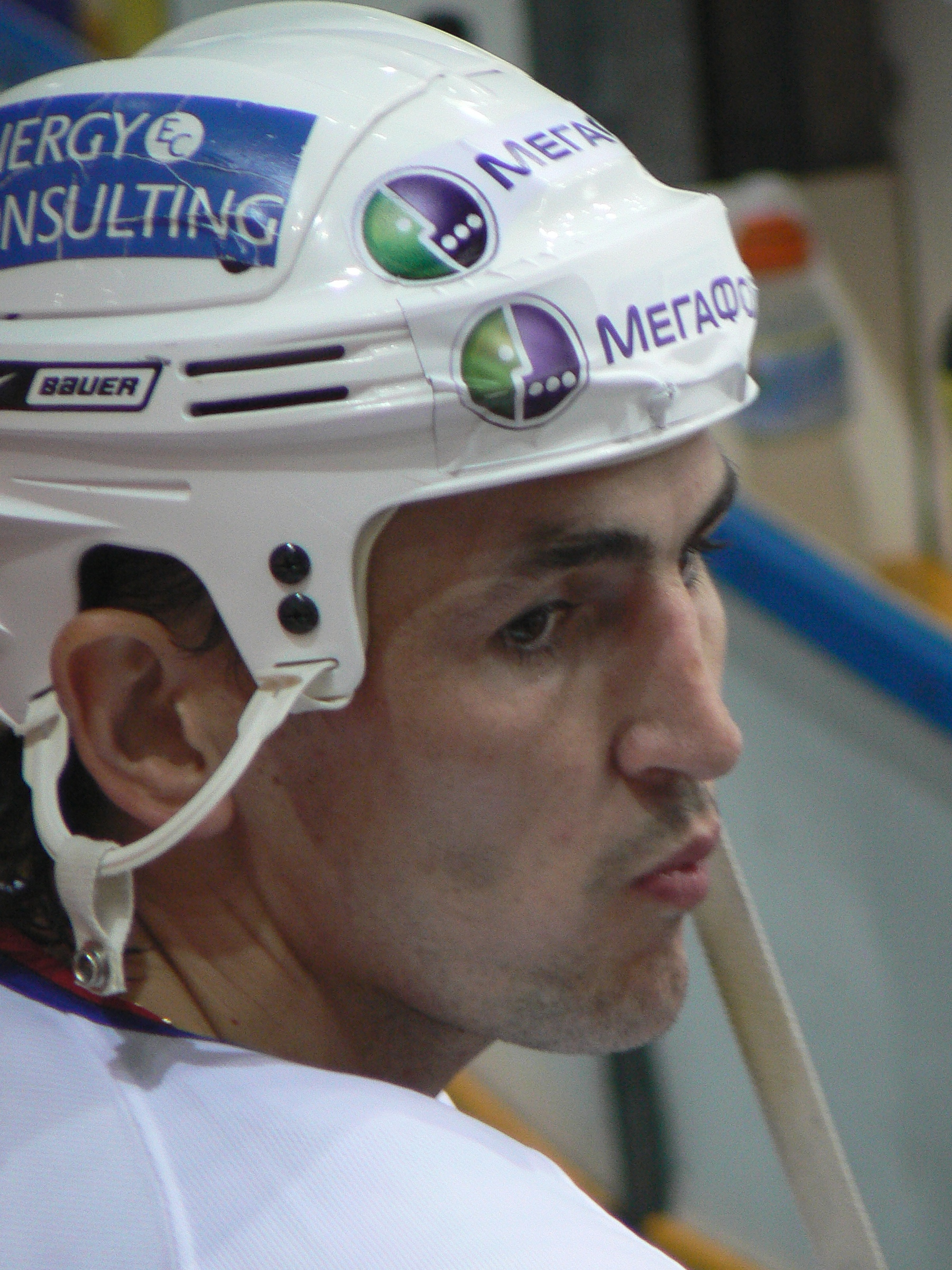
- Born: July 25, 1972 (age 53) Naberezhnye Chelny, Russian SFSR, Soviet Union
- Height: 6 ft 1 in (185 cm)
- Weight: 183 lb (83 kg; 13 st 1 lb)
- Position: Left wing
- Shot: Left
- Played for: Metallurg Magnitogorsk; NHL; Winnipeg Jets
- National team: Russia
- NHL draft: 93rd overall, 1993; Winnipeg Jets
- Playing career: 1990–2010

Ravil Midekhatovich Gusmanov (Russian: Равиль Мидехатович Гусманов, born July 25, 1972) is a Russian former professional ice hockey left winger, formerly of Metallurg Magnitogorsk and Traktor Chelyabinsk in the Kontinental Hockey League.

He was drafted in the fourth round, 93rd overall, of the 1993 NHL entry draft by the Winnipeg Jets, and he played in four National Hockey League games with the Jets, going scoreless.

== Career statistics ==
=== Regular season and playoffs ===
			Regular season					Playoffs
Season	Team	League	GP	G	A	Pts	PIM	GP	G	A	Pts	PIM
1989–90	Metallurg Chelyabinsk	URS.2	28	7	4	11	4	—	—	—	—	—
1990–91	Traktor Chelyabinsk	USSR	15	0	0	0	10	—	—	—	—	—
1990–91	Mechel Chelyabinsk	URS.2	20	3	3	6	12	—	—	—	—	—
1991–92	Traktor Chelyabinsk	CIS	30	3	1	4	16	8	1	3	4	4
1991–92	Mechel Chelyabinsk	CIS.2	5	0	1	1	0	—	—	—	—	—
1992–93	Traktor Chelyabinsk	RUS	39	15	8	23	30	8	4	0	4	2
1993–94	Traktor Chelyabinsk	RUS	43	18	9	27	51	6	4	3	7	10
1994–95	Springfield Falcons	AHL	72	18	15	33	14	—	—	—	—	—
1995–96	Winnipeg Jets	NHL	4	0	0	0	0	—	—	—	—	—
1995–96	Springfield Falcons	AHL	60	32	36	68	20	—	—	—	—	—
1995–96	Indianapolis Ice	IHL	11	6	10	16	4	5	2	3	5	4
1996–97	Indianapolis Ice	IHL	60	21	27	48	14	—	—	—	—	—
1996–97	Saint John Flames	AHL	12	4	4	8	2	3	0	1	1	2
1997–98	Chicago Wolves	IHL	56	27	28	55	26	11	1	3	4	19
1998–99	Metallurg Magnitogorsk	RSL	42	14	24	38	28	16	2	8	10	16
1999–2000	Metallurg Magnitogorsk	RSL	37	12	13	25	30	11	3	5	8	6
2000–01	Metallurg Magnitogorsk	RSL	43	6	19	25	18	12	1	9	10	10
2001–02	Houston Aeros	AHL	1	0	0	0	0	—	—	—	—	—
2001–02	Metallurg Magnitogorsk	RSL	32	8	18	26	22	9	1	1	2	12
2002–03	Metallurg Magnitogorsk	RSL	22	2	3	5	10	3	0	1	1	0
2003–04	Metallurg Magnitogorsk	RSL	57	18	11	29	26	11	3	0	3	10
2004–05	Metallurg Magnitogorsk	RSL	46	10	16	26	12	4	0	1	1	2
2005–06	Metallurg Magnitogorsk	RSL	46	11	13	24	22	7	2	1	3	6
2006–07	Metallurg Magnitogorsk	RSL	51	7	12	19	32	14	2	3	5	10
2007–08	Metallurg Magnitogorsk	RSL	52	12	9	21	16	13	3	6	9	6
2008–09	Metallurg Magnitogorsk	KHL	20	0	1	1	6	—	—	—	—	—
2008–09	Traktor Chelyabinsk	KHL	25	7	11	18	14	3	0	0	0	4
2009–10	Traktor Chelyabinsk	KHL	55	9	17	26	22	4	1	0	1	6
NHL totals			4	0	0	0	0	—	—	—	—	—
RSL totals			428	100	133	233	218	98	17	37	54	78
KHL totals			100	16	28	44	42	7	1	0	1	10

=== International ===
Year	Team	Event	GP	G	A	Pts	PIM
1990	Soviet Union	EJC	6	3	1	4	0
1992	CIS	WJC	7	1	1	2	0
1994	Russia	OG	8	3	1	4	0
1999	Russia	WC	6	2	3	5	2
2001	Russia	WC	7	2	6	8	2
2002	Russia	WC	7	3	0	3	8
Junior totals			13	4	2	6	0
Senior totals			28	10	10	20	12
