= Magnus Enfeldt =

Swedish speed skater

Personal information
- Nationality: Swedish
- Born: 25 August 1969 (age 55); Köping, Sweden

Sport
- Sport: Speed skating

Magnus Enfeldt (born 25 August 1969) is a Swedish speed skater. He competed in two events at the 1994 Winter Olympics.
