= Dejan Jekovec =

Slovenian ski jumper

Personal information
- Nationality: Slovenian
- Born: 22 August 1974 (age 50); Tržič, Yugoslavia

Sport
- Sport: Ski jumping

Dejan Jekovec (born 22 August 1974) is a Slovenian ski jumper. He competed in the normal hill event at the 1994 Winter Olympics.
