= Kurt Einberger =

Austrian bobsledder (born 1966)

Kurt Einberger (born 27 January 1966 in Brixlegg) is an Austrian bobsledder who competed in the 1990s. Competing in two Winter Olympics, he earned his best finish of sixth in the four-man event at Lillehammer in 1994.
