= Lee Jae-sik =

South Korean speed skater

Personal information
- Nationality: South Korean
- Born: 13 March 1972 (age 53); North Gyeongsang Province, South Korea

Sport
- Sport: Speed skating

Lee Jae-sik (born 13 March 1972) is a South Korean speed skater. He competed in three events at the 1994 Winter Olympics.
