= Lysgårdsbakken =

Ski jumping hill in Lillehammer, Norway

Coordinates: 61°07′30″N 10°29′14″E

- Lysgårdsbakkene Ski Jumping Arena
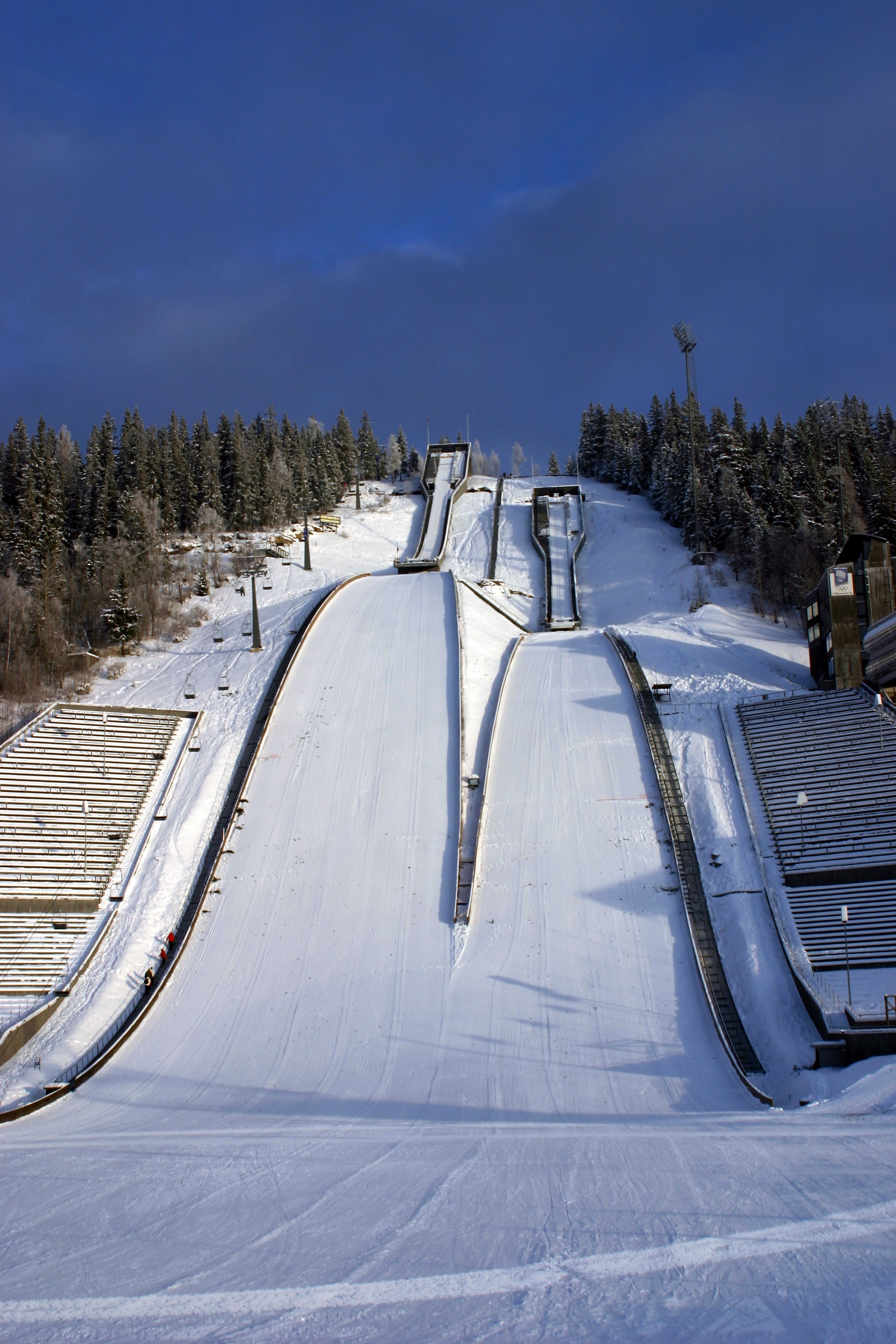
- Lysgårdsbakken
- Location: Lillehammer, Norway
- Opened: 1993
- Renovated: 2007

Size
- K–point: K-90; K-123
- Hill size: HS98; HS140
- Hill record: 107.5 m (353 ft) (Germany) Karl Geiger (6 December 2013); 146 m (479 ft) (Switzerland) Simon Ammann (6 December 2009) (Germany) Markus Eisenbichler (16 March 2023)

Top events
- Olympics: 1994 Winter Olympics; 2016 Winter Youth Olympics

Lysgårdsbakken, officially known as Lysgårdsbakkene Ski Jumping Arena (Norwegian: Lysgårdsbakkene hoppanlegg), is a ski jumping hill in Lillehammer Municipality in Norway. It consists of a large hill, with a K-point of 123 and a hill size of 140, and a normal hill with a K-point of 90 and a hill size of 98. It opened in 1993 for the 1994 Winter Olympics, where it hosted the ski jumping and Nordic combined events, as well as the opening and closing ceremonies. After the Olympics, ownership was transferred to the municipal Lillehammer Olympiapark and it has since been used for several FIS Ski Jumping World Cup and FIS Nordic Combined World Cup tournaments, including hosting the Nordic Tournament. It has a capacity for 35,000 spectators and is one of three national ski jumping hills in Norway. In 2007, the large hill was rebuilt to a larger profile, and received a new plastic lining. The venue sees 80,000 annual jumps in the winter and 20,000 in the summer season.

== Construction ==
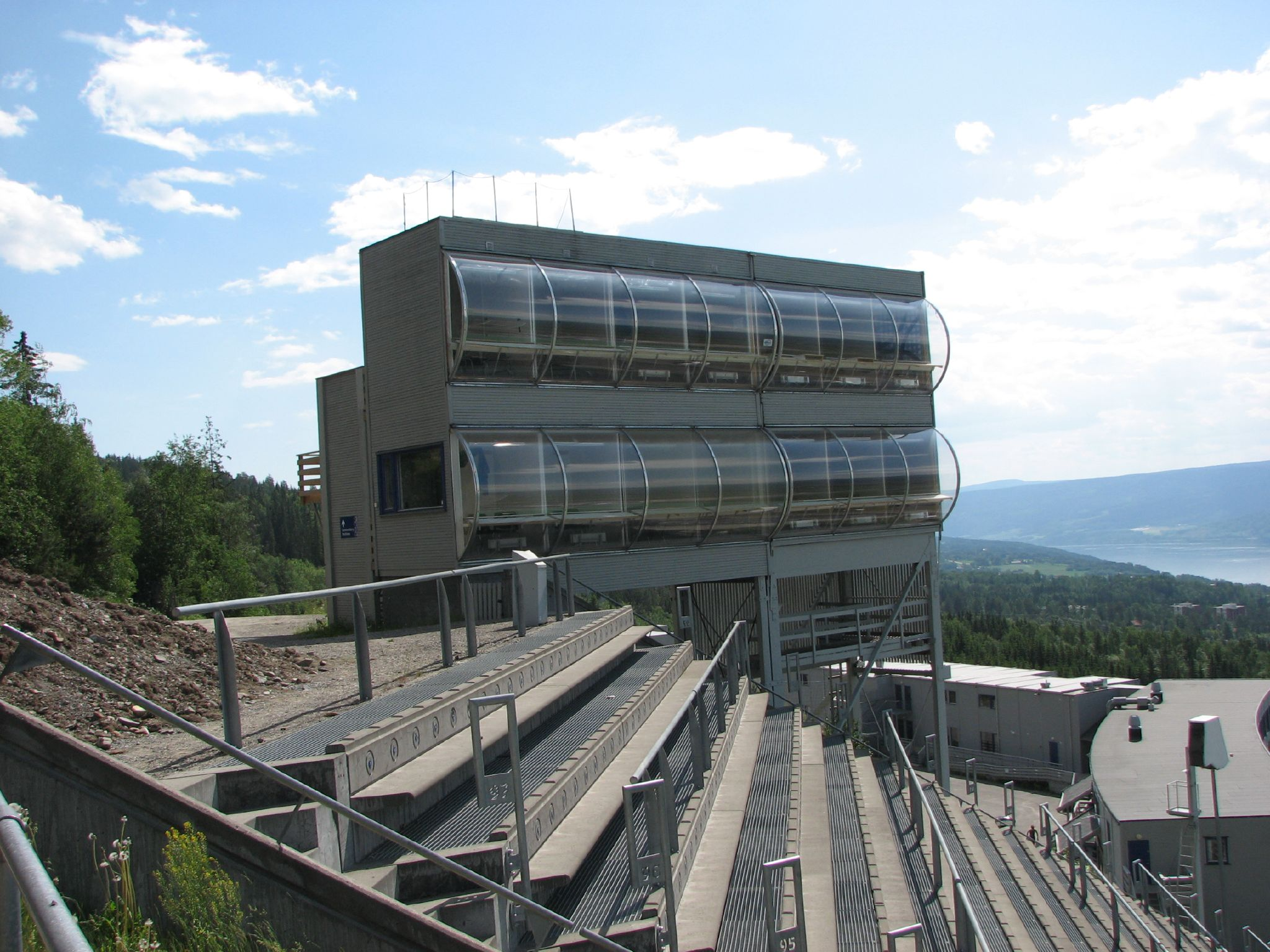
Stands and commentators' boxes

The plans which were approved when Lillehammer were awarded the 1994 Winter Olympics, involved using the existing Balbergbakken near Fåberg, north of the town of Lillehammer. However, the venue was rejected due technical reasons and also because of its structural lag and instead it was decided that an all-new venue would be built at Lysgård. Financing for the venue was given through a grant issued by the Parliament of Norway on 1 August 1990. Architects were Økaw Arkitekter, with Martin M. Bakken as the main contractor. Construction had already stated earlier in 1990, and it was completed by December 1992. The seating area was made with pre-fabricated concrete elements with metal bars. Temporary buildings and facilities for the opening ceremonies were installed in December 1993, and removed after the Olympics. This included 70 commentators' boxes, a media center, and offices for technical personnel. The original construction included plastic on the outrun and porcelain tracks on the small hill, allowing jumping during summer. The venue was placed deep in the terrain to shield the jumpers from the wind while minimizing the venue's impact on the surroundings. The National Association of Norwegian Architects awarded the hill the 1993 Betongtavlen. In 2007, the large hill was renovated. The profile was expanded, increasing the K-point from 120 to 123. In addition, plastic way was laid, allowing both hills to be used during summer.

== Facilities ==
The hill has a capacity for 35,000 spectators, of which 7,500 can be seated. In addition, up to 25,000 people can follow events from free areas around the venue. Auxiliary structures include a start house, a judges tower—which includes office space for organizers and judges—a media building, and a technical room below the stands, as well as a first aid room and restrooms. It also features a high-pressure snow production facility with outtakes all along the approach and outrun. Transport to the tower of the large hill is accessible via a chair lift. During the Olympics, transport to the venues was mostly by railway. Spectators discharged at Lillehammer Station on the Dovre Line and would then walk to the stadium.

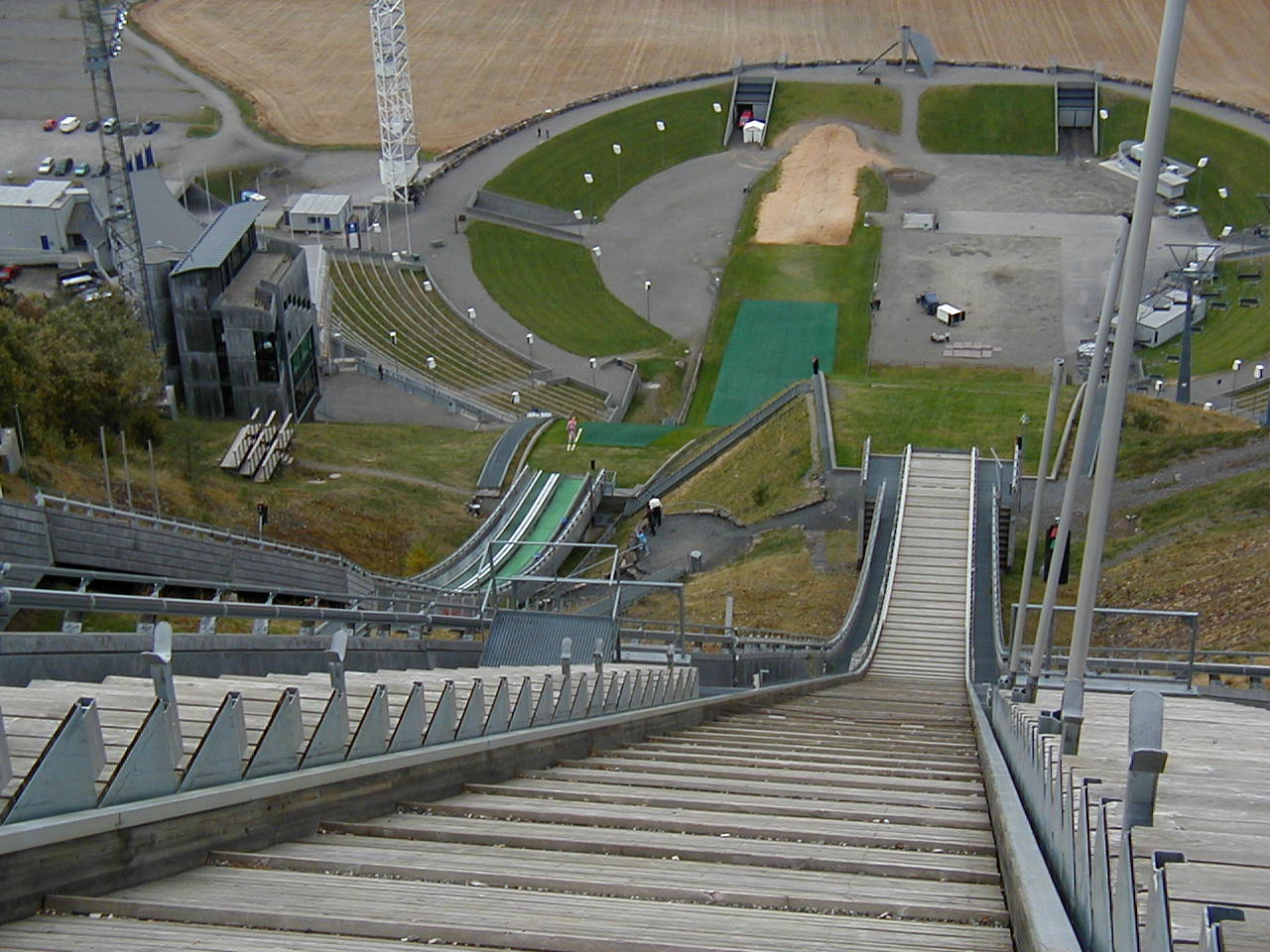
View down the large hill, from before the renovation

The small hill has a K-point of 90 and a hill size of 98. It has a 34.5° slope for the outrun and an 11.2° slope for the approach. The height difference is 112 meters (367 ft) and the approach is 82 meters (269 ft) long. Prior to 2007, the large hill had a K-point of 123, a 27.5° slope for the outrun and an 11.5° slope for the approach. The height difference was 137 meters (449 ft), while the approach is 96.6 meters (317 ft) long. After 2007, the hill size was increased to 138 and the K-point to 123. Currently, the hill size is 140.

== Events ==
During the 1994 Winter Olympics, the venue hosted the opening and closing ceremonies, three ski jumping and two Nordic combined events, in addition to the opening and closing ceremonies. Competition events consisted of individual normal hill, individual large hill, and team large hill in ski jumping, and individual and team small hill for Nordic combined.

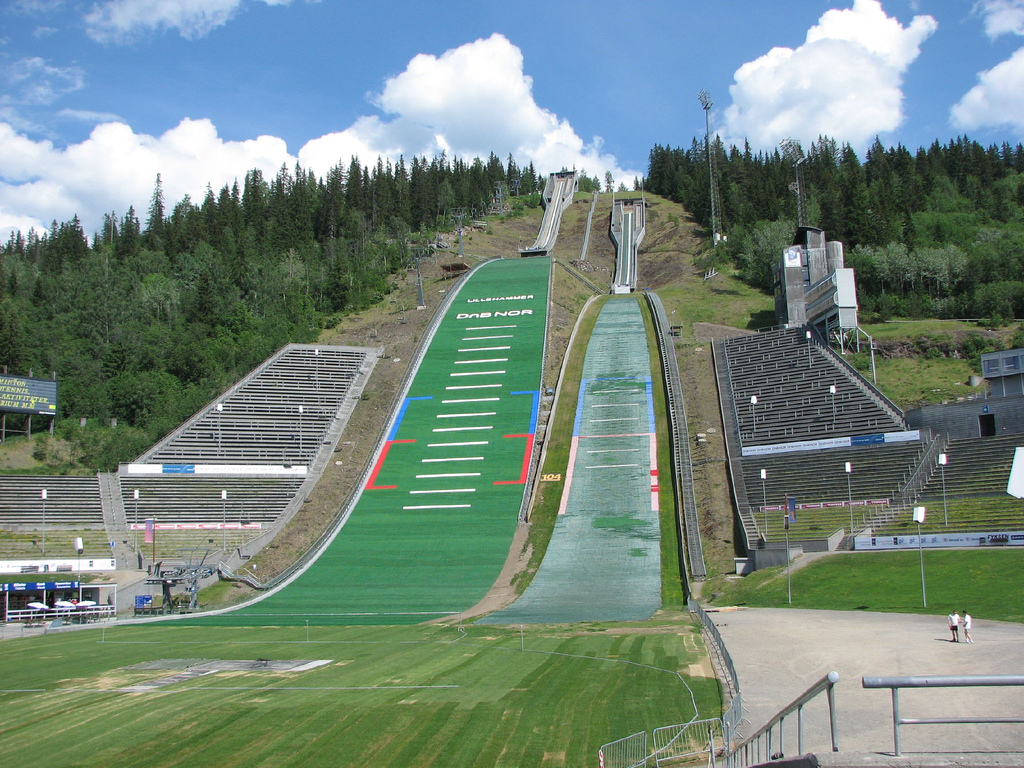
The hills in 2007, just after the new plastic had been laid

Lysgårdsbakken is a regular site for FIS Ski Jumping World Cup and FIS Nordic Combined World Cup tournaments. FIS Ski Jumping World Cup has been hosted nearly every year since 1993. Since 2004, with the exception of 2007 and 2010, Lysgårdsbakken is a co-host of the Nordic Tournament. The FIS Nordic Combined World Cup has been hosted nine times, in 1993, 1998, 2000, 2001, 2003, 2005, 2006, 2009, and 2010. All tournaments have been held in December; nine of the ten have had the cross-country skiing part held at nearby Birkebeineren Ski Stadium, while in 2001 the cross-country skiing was held at Beitostølen. The venue hosted the same events during the 2016 Winter Youth Olympics, where Lysgårdsbakken would be used for ski jumping and Nordic combined.

The hill record for the large hill is 146 meters (479 ft), set by Simon Ammann in 2009. The summer record for the large hill is 140.5 meters (461 ft), set by Thomas Lobben in 2007. The winter record for the small hill is 104 meters (341 ft), set by Espen Bredesen during the 1994 Olympics. The summer small hill record is 106.5 meters (349 ft), set by Daniela Iraschko in 2010. The hill is one of three national ski jumping hills in Norway, with the other two being Holmenkollbakken in Oslo and Granåsen in Trondheim. Lysgårdsbakken is regularly used as a training venue, and sees 80,000 winter jumps and 20,000 summer jumps per year.

In 2005, the hills were the eleventh-most visited tourist attraction in Norway. The hill has a souvenir shop and visitors are permitted to take the elevator to the top of the hill. Alternatively, tourists can walk the 954 steps to the top. In 2006, a Winter Olympics-themed special of the BBC television show Top Gear was filmed at the Olympic venues around Lillehammer, which included a successful attempt at a ski jump using an unoccupied rocket-powered British Leyland Mk V Mini. KT Tunstall shot the majority of the video for her 2008 single "If Only" at Lysgårdsbakken.
