= Kurt Stein =

American ski jumper

Kurt Stein (born June 30, 1970) is an American former ski jumper who competed in the 1992 Winter Olympics and the 1994 Winter Olympics. Stein was inducted into the American Ski Jumping Hall of Fame in 2008.
