= Oleg Petrov (bobsleigh) =

Russian bobsledder

Personal information
- Nationality: Russian
- Born: 17 March 1967 (age 58); Ufa, Russian SFSR, Soviet Union

Sport
- Sport: Bobsleigh

Oleg Petrov (born 17 March 1967) is a Russian bobsledder. He competed at the 1992 Winter Olympics, representing the Unified Team, and the 1994 and the 1998 Winter Olympics, representing Russia.

== Career ==
Petrov competed in the 1992 Winter Olympics at Albertville, France as a four-man bobsleigh representing the Unified Team and he was tied for 22nd place.

In the 1994 Winter Olympics, he got 24th and 29th respectively, for the four-man bobsleigh and the two-man bobsleigh, representing Russia.

At the 1998 Winter Olympics, he got 21st for the two-man bobsleigh, representing Russia.
