= 1994 Winter Olympics opening ceremony =

- Part of 1994 Winter Olympics
- Date: 12 February 1994
- Venue: Lysgårdsbakken
- Location: Lillehammer, Norway; 61.1256°N 10.4879°E
- Filmed by: 1994 Olympic Radio and Television Organisation (NRK ORTO '94)

The opening ceremony of the 1994 Winter Olympics took place on 12 February 1994 at Lysgårdsbakken in Lillehammer, Norway.

== Ceremony ==
Artistic content was made to present a range of Norwegian culture, included Sami joik, Telemark skiing, fiddlers and folk dancing, simulations of traditional weddings and their processions, and vetter from Norse mythology. The ceremony was hosted by an actress Liv Ullmann and explorer and sailor Thor Heyerdahl, 79 years old at the time. After speeches by LOOC President Gerhard Heiberg and IOC president Juan Antonio Samaranch, the games were officially declared opened by King Harald V. The Olympic Flame was to be carried by a skier down the ski jump before lighting the cauldron. Originally this task had rested upon Ole Gunnar Fidjestøl, but after he was injured in a practice jump, his back-up Stein Gruben received the honour. The cauldron was lit by Crown Prince Haakon. The Olympic oaths were issued by Vegard Ulvang for the athletes and Kari Kåring for the officials. Finnish Sami poet Nils-Aslak Valkeapää performed at the opening ceremony.

On the day of the opening ceremonies, art thieves stole Edvard Munch's masterpiece The Scream from the National Museum in Oslo.

== Anthems ==
- Norwegian national anthem
- Olympic Hymn - Sissel Kyrkjebø
