= Johan Rasmussen =

Swedish ski jumper

Personal information
- Born: 18 July 1970 (age 56) Borås, Västra Götaland County, Sweden

Sport
- Sport: Skiing
- Club: IF Friska Viljor

World Cup career
- Seasons: 1990–1996
- Indiv. wins: 0
- Updated on 18 January 2010

Johan Rasmussen (born 18 July 1970) is a Swedish former ski jumper. He competed in the FIS Ski Jumping World Cup from 1990 to 1996, with twelfth place being his best career finish. He also competed in three World Championships and the 1994 Olympics.

He was born in Borås, and represented the club IF Friska Viljor in Örnsköldsvik. He made his World Cup debut in March 1990 with a 71st place in Örnsköldsvik, and made three starts in 1991. He also participated in the 1991 World Ski Championships. He made ten starts in the 1991–1992 World Cup, collecting his first World Cup points with a 21st place in March 1992 in Trondheim. In the 1992–1993 World Cup he participated in the Four Hills Tournament, and collected World Cup points three times there before achieving a career best; a 20th place in Lahti in March 1993. At the 1993 World Ski Championships he finished 31st in the normal hill and 34th in the large hill.

In the 1993–1994 World Cup he racked up two twelfth places in December; in Predazzo and Engelberg. He also achieved a 25th, 27th and 21st place. His last World Cup race of the season, where he finished 41st, doubled as the 1994 Ski-Flying World Championships. At the 1994 Winter Olympics, he finished 41st in the large hill and tenth in the team competition. In the 1994–1995 World Cup he only collected World Cup points three times, with a 23rd, 19th and 24 place, and at the 1995 World Ski Championships he finished 47th in the normal hill and 53rd in the large hill. In the 1995–1996 World Cup he only managed one 27th place as his best, as well as a 44th place at the 1996 Ski-Flying World Championships.
