= Fredrik Johansson (ski jumper) =

Swedish ski jumper (born 1974)

Personal information
- Nationality: Swedish
- Born: 14 July 1974 (age 51) Heby, Sweden

Sport
- Sport: Ski jumping

Fredrik Johansson (born 14 July 1974) is a Swedish ski jumper. He competed in the normal hill and large hill events at the 1994 Winter Olympics.
