= Sergei Tarasov (biathlete) =

Russian biathlete (born 1965)

Personal information
- Full name: Sergei Petrovich Tarasov
- Born: 15 February 1965 (age 61) Staroaleiskoe, Altai Krai, Russian SFSR, Soviet Union
- Height: 1.76 m (5 ft 9 in)

Sport

Professional information
- Sport: Biathlon

Olympic Games
- Teams: 2 (1994, 1998)
- Medals: 4 (1 gold)

World Championships
- Teams: 5 (1991, 1993, 1994, 1996, 1997)
- Medals: 9 (2 gold)

World Cup
- Seasons: 9 (1989/90–1997/98)
- Individual victories: 4
- Individual podiums: 13
Medal record
Men's biathlon
Representing Russia
Olympic Games
Gold medal – first place	1994 Lillehammer	20 km individual
Silver medal – second place	1994 Lillehammer	4 × 7.5 km relay
Bronze medal – third place	1994 Lillehammer	10 km sprint
Bronze medal – third place	1998 Nagano	4 × 7.5 km relay
World Championships
Gold medal – first place	1996 Ruhpolding	20 km individual
Gold medal – first place	1996 Ruhpolding	4 × 7.5 km relay
Silver medal – second place	1993 Borovets	20 km individual
Silver medal – second place	1993 Borovets	4 × 7.5 km relay
Silver medal – second place	1994 Canmore	Team event
Silver medal – second place	1997 Brezno-Osrblie	12.5 km pursuit
Bronze medal – third place	1993 Borovets	10 km sprint
Representing the Soviet Union
World Championships
Silver medal – second place	1991 Lahti	4 × 7.5 km relay
Bronze medal – third place	1991 Lahti	Team event

Sergei Petrovich Tarasov (Russian: Сергей Петрович Тарасов; born 15 February 1965) is a former Russian biathlete. In the 1990s, he was one of the dominating biathletes, winning four Olympic medals and seven World Championship medals over the course of his career.

== Albertville incident ==
During the 1992 Winter Olympics in Albertville, France, Tarasov became acutely ill and had to be taken to the hospital. Rumours about the cause of his grave medical condition soon started floating around the Olympic village, and was also reported in the press, but the Russian team leaders said he'd suffered kidney failure from eating poisonous mushrooms. Many years later, in 2015, Tarasov gave an interview where he confirmed what many had thought in 1992, his kidney failure was caused by a botched blood transfusion. He'd either gotten someone else's blood, or the blood had not been properly refrigerated during storage. The blood transfusion at the Olympics was done by the team to illegally enhance his performance in the upcoming competitions, but nearly cost him his life.

== Biathlon results ==
All results are sourced from the International Biathlon Union.

=== Olympic Games ===
4 medals (1 gold, 1 silver, 2 bronze)

Event	Individual	Sprint	Relay
(Norway) 1994 Lillehammer	Gold	Bronze	Silver
(Japan) 1998 Nagano	15th	22nd	Bronze

=== World Championships ===
9 medals (2 gold, 5 silver, 2 bronze)

Event	Individual	Sprint	Pursuit	Team	Relay
(Finland) 1991 Lahti	10th	10th	—N/a	Bronze	Silver
(Bulgaria) 1993 Borovets	Silver	Bronze	—N/a	—	Silver
(Canada) 1994 Canmore	—N/a	—N/a	—N/a	Silver	—N/a
(Germany) 1996 Ruhpolding	Gold	9th	—N/a	—	Gold
(Slovakia) 1997 Brezno-Osrblie	30th	5th	Silver	15th	8th

*During Olympic seasons competitions are only held for those events not included in the Olympic program.
**Pursuit was added as an event in 1997.

=== Individual victories ===
4 victories (3 In, 1 Sp)

Season	Date	Location	Discipline	Level
1990–91; 1 victory (1 Sp)	19 January 1991	(Germany) Ruhpolding	10 km sprint	Biathlon World Cup
1993–94; 2 victories (2 In)	9 December 1993	(Austria) Bad Gastein	20 km individual	Biathlon World Cup
1993–94; 2 victories (2 In)	20 February 1994	(Norway) Lillehammer	20 km individual	Winter Olympic Games
1995–96; 1 victory (1 In)	4 February 1996	(Germany) Ruhpolding	20 km individual	Biathlon World Championships

*Results are from UIPMB and IBU races which include the Biathlon World Cup, Biathlon World Championships and the Winter Olympic Games.
