= Oleg Sukhoruchenko =

Russian bobsledder (born 1965)

Personal information
- Nationality: Russian
- Born: 4 July 1965 (age 59); Angarsk, Russian SFSR, Soviet Union

Sport
- Sport: Bobsleigh

Oleg Sukhoruchenko (born 4 July 1965) is a Russian bobsledder. He competed at the 1992 Winter Olympics and the 1994 Winter Olympics.
