= Arjan Schreuder =

Dutch speed skater

Personal information
- Nationality: Dutch
- Born: 19 January 1972 (age 53); Amsterdam, Netherlands

Sport
- Sport: Speed skating

Arjan Schreuder (born 19 January 1972) is a Dutch speed skater.

== Professional career ==
He competed in two events at the 1994 Winter Olympics.
