= Martin Krainz =

Austrian ice hockey player

Personal information
- Nationality: Austrian
- Born: 20 May 1967 (age 58) Klagenfurt, Austria

Sport
- Sport: Ice hockey

Martin Krainz (born 20 May 1967) is an Austrian ice hockey player. He competed in the men's tournament at the 1994 Winter Olympics.
