= Speed skating at the 1994 Winter Olympics =

Speed skating at the XVII Olympic Winter Games
- Venue: Hamar Olympic Hall
- Dates: 13–25 February 1994
- No. of events: 10
- Competitors: 150 from 21 nations

Speed skating at the 1994 Winter Olympics, was held from 13 to 25 February. Ten events were contested at Hamar Olympic Hall.

== Medal summary ==
=== Medal table ===
Rank	Nation	Gold	Silver	Bronze	Total
1	Norway	3	2	0	5
2	United States	3	0	0	3
3	Russia	2	2	1	5
4	Germany	1	2	3	6
5	Austria	1	1	0	2
6	Netherlands	0	1	3	4
7	Belarus	0	1	0	1
7	Canada	0	1	0	1
9	Japan	0	0	2	2
10	China	0	0	1	1
Totals (10 entries)		10	10	10	30

Norway led the medal table in speed skating on home ice, led by Johann Olav Koss, who won three gold medals. Bonnie Blair was the most successful woman, with a pair of gold medals. Germany won the most total medals, with six, though only a single gold.

Belarus won its first medal in speed skating, with the nation competing in the Winter Olympics for the first time. Russia competed not as the Soviet Union for the first time and clinched five medals, building on its huge speed skating tradition.

=== Men's events ===
Event	Gold		Silver		Bronze	
500 metres	Aleksandr Golubev; Russia	36.33 (OR)	Sergey Klevchenya; Russia	36.39	Manabu Horii; Japan	36.53
1000 metres	Dan Jansen; United States	1:12.43; WR	Igor Zhelezovski; Belarus	1:12.72	Sergey Klevchenya; Russia	1:12.85
1500 metres	Johann Olav Koss; Norway	1:51.29; WR	Rintje Ritsma; Netherlands	1:51.99	Falko Zandstra; Netherlands	1:52.38
5000 metres	Johann Olav Koss; Norway	6:34.96; WR	Kjell Storelid; Norway	6:42.68	Rintje Ritsma; Netherlands	6:43.94
10,000 metres	Johann Olav Koss; Norway	13:30.55; WR	Kjell Storelid; Norway	13:49.25	Bart Veldkamp; Netherlands	13:56.73

=== Women's events ===
Event	Gold		Silver		Bronze	
500 metres	Bonnie Blair; United States	39.25	Susan Auch; Canada	39.61	Franziska Schenk; Germany	39.70
1000 metres	Bonnie Blair; United States	1:18.74	Anke Baier; Germany	1:20.12	Ye Qiaobo; China	1:20.22
1500 metres	Emese Hunyady; Austria	2:02.19	Svetlana Fedotkina; Russia	2:02.69	Gunda Niemann; Germany	2:03.41
3000 metres	Svetlana Bazhanova; Russia	4:17.43	Emese Hunyady; Austria	4:18.14	Claudia Pechstein; Germany	4:18.34
5000 metres	Claudia Pechstein; Germany	7:14.37	Gunda Niemann; Germany	7:14.88	Hiromi Yamamoto; Japan	7:19.68

== Records ==
Four world records and five Olympic records were set in Lillehammer.

Event	Date	Team	Time	OR	WR
Men's 500 metres	14 February	Aleksandr Golubev (RUS)	36.33	OR	
Men's 1000 metres	18 February	Dan Jansen (USA)	1:12.43	OR	WR
Men's 1500 metres	16 February	Johann Olav Koss (NOR)	1:51.29	OR	WR
Men's 5000 metres	13 February	Johann Olav Koss (NOR)	6:34.96	OR	WR
Men's 10000 metres	20 February	Johann Olav Koss (NOR)	13:30.55	OR	WR

== Participating NOCs ==
Twenty-one nations competed in the speed skating events at Lillehammer. Belarus, Kazakhstan, and Ukraine made their Olympic speed skating debuts.

- Australia (2)
- Austria (5)
- Belarus (2)
- Canada (13)
- China (6)
- Germany (15)
- Hungary (1)
- Italy (5)
- Japan (17)
- Kazakhstan (8)
- South Korea (9)
- Latvia (1)
- Netherlands (13)
- Norway (8)
- Poland (5)
- Romania (4)
- Russia (12)
- Switzerland (1)
- Sweden (5)
- Ukraine (2)
- United States (16)
