= Luiza Noskova =

Russian biathlete (born 1968)

Medal record

Representing Russia

Women's biathlon

Olympic Games
Gold medal – first place	1994 Lillehammer	4 x 7.5 km relay

Luiza Nikolayevna Noskova (Russian: Луиза Николаевна Носкова; born 7 July 1968 in Labytnangi) is a Russian biathlete. At the 1994 Winter Olympics in Lillehammer, she won a gold medal with the Russian relay team.
