= Dmitry Chelovenko =

Russian ski jumper

Personal information
- Nationality: Russian
- Born: 3 April 1974 (age 52) Nizhny Novgorod, RSFSR, USSR

Sport
- Sport: Ski jumping

Dmitry Vyacheslavovich Chelovenko (Russian: Дмитрий Вячеславович Человенко; born 3 April 1974) is a Russian ski jumper. He competed in the normal hill and large hill events at the 1994 Winter Olympics.
