= Natalya Snytina =

Russian biathlete

Personal information
- Nationality: Russian
- Born: 13 February 1971 (age 55) Zlatoust

Sport
- Sport: Biathlon
Medal record
Representing Russia
Women's biathlon
Olympic Games
Gold medal – first place	1994 Lillehammer	4 x 7.5 km relay

Natalya Anatolyevna Snytina (Russian: Наталья Анатольевна Снытина) born 13 February 1971 in Zlatoust) is a Russian biathlete. At the 1994 Winter Olympics in Lillehammer, she won a gold medal with the Russian relay team.
