= Dave Besteman =

American speed skater

Dave Besteman (born David Robert Besteman), is a former Olympic speed skater.

== Biography ==
Besteman was born on February 2, 1963, in Madison, Wisconsin.

== Olympic results ==
Year	Event	Place
1992	Men's 1,000 Metres	20
1994	Men's 500 Metres	27
1994	Men's 1,000 Metres	30
