= Pat Kelly (speed skater) =

Canadian speed skater

Patrick Kelly
Personal information
- Nationality: Canadian
- Born: Leonard Patrick Kelly; June 23, 1962 (age 64) Toronto, Ontario
- Spouse: Karen Courtland (figure skater)

Sport
- Country: Canada
- Sport: Speed skating

Achievements and titles
- Olympic finals: 1992 winter and 1994 winter

Leonard Patrick Kelly (born June 23, 1962, in Toronto, Ontario) is a former ice speed skater from Canada, who represented his native country in two consecutive Winter Olympics, starting in 1992 in Albertville, France. Kelly is married to former American pair skater Karen Courtland. He now lives and skates part-time in Lake Placid, NY. On Feb 6th, 2010 he skated a 40.13 outdoors on the Olympic oval.
