= Hans Markström =

Swedish speed skater

Hans Peter Markström (born 2 October 1965 in Ludvika, Dalarna) is a former ice speed skater from Sweden, who represented his native country in two consecutive Winter Olympics, starting in 1992 in Albertville, France. He mainly competed in the sprint events.
