= Sergey Klevchenya =

Russian speed skater

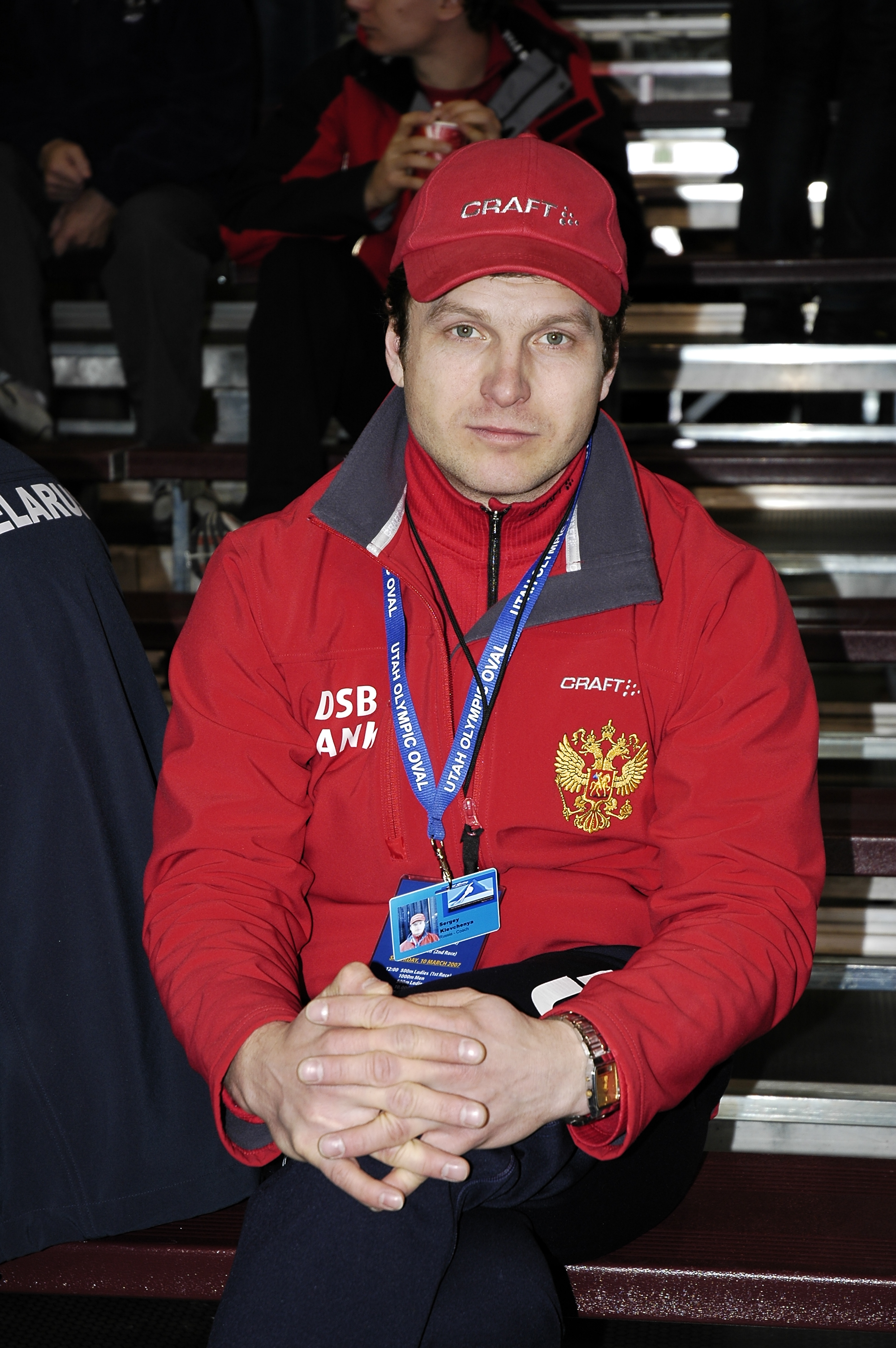

Personal information
- Nationality: Russian
- Born: Sergey Konstantinovich Klevchenya; January 21, 1971 (age 55) Barnaul, Russian SFSR, Soviet Union
- Height: 1.76 m (5 ft 9 in)
- Weight: 70 kg (154 lb)

Sport
- Country: Russia
- Sport: Speed skating
- Turned pro: 1992
- Retired: 2002

Achievements and titles
- Personal bests: 500 m: 35.00 (2002); 1000 m: 1:08.41 (2002); 1500 m: 1:49.24 (2001); 3000 m: 3:56.59 (2001); 5000 m: 7:18.79 (1988)
Medal record
Men's speed skating
Representing Russia
Olympic Games
Silver medal – second place	1994 Lillehammer	500 m
Bronze medal – third place	1994 Lillehammer	1000 m
World Sprint Championships
Silver medal – second place	1994 Calgary	Sprint
Gold medal – first place	1996 Heerenveen	Sprint
Gold medal – first place	1997 Hamar	Sprint
World Single Distance Championships
Silver medal – second place	1996 Hamar	500 m

Sergey Konstantinovich Klevchenya (Russian: Серге́й Константинович Клевченя, born January 21, 1971, in Barnaul) is a Russian speed skater who competed for the Unified Team in the 1992 Winter Olympics and for Russia in the 1994 Winter Olympics, in the 1998 Winter Olympics, and in the 2002 Winter Olympics.

In 1992 he competed for the Unified Team and finished 21st in the 500 metres event.

Two years later when competing for Russia he won the silver medal in the 500 metres competition and the bronze medal in the 1000 metres contest.

At the 1998 Games he finished 14th in the 500 metres event and 33rd in the 1000 metres competition.

His final Olympic appearance was in 2002 when he finished ninth in the 1000 metres contest and 13th in the 500 metres event.
