= Mikhail Vostroknutov =

Russian speed skater

Personal information
- Native name: Михаил Вострокнутов
- Full name: Mikhail Vostroknutov
- Nationality: Russian
- Born: 22 December 1969 (age 56) Perm, Russia

Sport
- Sport: Speed skating

Mikhail Vostroknutov (Russian: Михаил Вострокнутов; born 22 December 1969) is a Russian speed skater. He competed in two events at the 1994 Winter Olympics.
