= Ivo Pertile =

Italian ski jumper

Personal information
- Full name: Ivo Pertile
- Nationality: Italy
- Born: 12 August 1971 (age 54) Predazzo, Italy

Sport
- Sport: Skiing

World Cup career
- Seasons: 1987; 1990; 1996
- Updated on 30 Mar 2015

Ivo Pertile (born 12 August 1971) is an Italian former ski jumper who competed from 1986 to 1996.

== Career ==
Pertile finished eighth in the team large hill and 31st in the individual normal hill events at the 1994 Winter Olympics in Lillehammer. His best finish at the Ski Jumping World Championships was 23rd in the normal hill event in Val di Fiemme in 1991. He also finished 17th at the 1994 Ski Flying World Championships in Planica. His best finish at World Cup level was fourth in a normal hill event in Val di Fiemme, Italy in 1990.

=== Further notable results ===
- 1990: 2nd, Italian championships of ski jumping
- 1991: 2nd, Italian championships of ski jumping
- 1992: 3rd, Italian championships of ski jumping
- 1993: 3rd, Italian championships of ski jumping
- 1994: 3rd, Italian championships of ski jumping
- 1995: 2nd, Italian championships of ski jumping
