= Stanislav Pokhilko =

Russian ski jumper

Personal information
- Nationality: Russian
- Born: 14 June 1975 (age 49)

Sport
- Sport: Ski jumping

Stanislav Pokhilko (born 14 June 1975) is a Russian ski jumper. He competed in the normal hill and large hill events at the 1994 Winter Olympics.
