= Matjaž Kladnik =

Slovenian ski jumper

Personal information
- Nationality: Slovenian
- Born: 19 September 1975 (age 49); Ljubljana, Yugoslavia

Sport
- Sport: Ski jumping

Matjaž Kladnik (born 19 September 1975) is a Slovenian ski jumper. He competed in the normal hill and large hill events at the 1994 Winter Olympics.
