= Aleksey Solodyankin =

Russian ski jumper

Personal information
- Nationality: Russian
- Born: 14 May 1972 (age 52); Kirov, Russia

Sport
- Sport: Ski jumping

Aleksey Solodyankin (born 14 May 1972) is a Russian ski jumper. He competed in the normal hill and large hill events at the 1994 Winter Olympics.
