= Oleh Kostromitin =

Ukrainian speed skater

Personal information
- Nationality: Ukrainian
- Born: 16 June 1972 (age 52); Sumy, Ukraine

Sport
- Sport: Speed skating

Oleh Kostromitin (born 16 June 1972) is a Ukrainian speed skater. He competed at the 1994 Winter Olympics and the 1998 Winter Olympics.
