= Ivan Lunardi =

Italian ski jumper (born 1973)

Personal information
- Nationality: Italy
- Born: 15 May 1973 (age 53) Asiago, Italy
- Height: 1.74 m (5 ft 8 1/2 in)

Sport
- Sport: Skiing

World Cup career
- Seasons: 1987; 1989–1994; 1997–2000
- Indiv. starts: 86
- Indiv. podiums: 1
- Indiv. wins: 1
- Team starts: 2

Achievements and titles
- Personal bests: 181 m (594 ft); Kulm, 18-19 February 2000
- Updated on 10 February 2016

Ivan Lunardi (born 15 May 1973) is an Italian former ski jumper.

== Career ==
At the 1992 Winter Olympics in Albertville, he finished seventh in the individual large hill event. Lunardi's best individual finish at the FIS Nordic World Ski Championships was fourth in the normal hill event at Falun in 1993. His best finish at the Ski-flying World Championships was ninth at Harrachov in 1992.

Lunardi's only World Cup victory was in a large hill event in Finland in 1993.

== World Cup ==
=== Standings ===
| Season | Overall | 4H | SF | NT | JP |
|---|---|---|---|---|---|
| 1986/87 | — | — | N/A | N/A | N/A |
| 1988/89 | — | 106 | N/A | N/A | N/A |
| 1989/90 | — | — | N/A | N/A | N/A |
| 1990/91 | — | — | — | N/A | N/A |
| 1991/92 | 17 | 31 | 16 | N/A | N/A |
| 1992/93 | 18 | 10 | — | N/A | N/A |
| 1993/94 | 61 | 45 | — | N/A | N/A |
| 1996/97 | — | 73 | — | — | — |
| 1997/98 | — | 59 | — | 46 | — |
| 1998/99 | 58 | — | 32 | — | 63 |
| 1999/00 | 49 | 45 | — | 38 | 49 |

=== Wins ===
| No. | Season | Date | Location | Hill | Size |
|---|---|---|---|---|---|
| 1 | 1992/93 | 7 March 1993 | (Finland) Lahti | Salpausselkä K114 | LH |
