= Samo Gostiša =

Slovenian ski jumper

Samo Gostiša (born 16 September 1972 in Logatec) is a Slovenian former ski jumper who competed from 1990 to 1997. At the 1992 Winter Olympics in Albertville, he finished sixth in the team large hill and 12th in the individual normal hill events

Gostica's best finish at the FIS Nordic World Ski Championships was at Falun in 1993 where he finished sixth in the individual normal hill events. His best finish at the Ski-flying World Championships was sixth at Harrachov in 1992 which was tied for his best career finish also earned that year (Germany was the other).
