= Jinya Nishikata =

Japanese ski jumper

Personal information
- Full name: Jinya Nishikata
- Born: 4 December 1968 (age 57) Nozawaonsen, Nagano, Japan
- Height: 1.78 m (5 ft 10 in)

Sport
- Sport: Skiing

World Cup career
- Seasons: 1988, 1993-2001
- Indiv. podiums: 4
Medal record
Men's ski jumping
Representing Japan
Olympic Games
Silver medal – second place	1994 Lillehammer	Team large hill
World Championships
Bronze medal – third place	1995 Thunder Bay	Team large hill
- Updated on October 7, 2011

Jinya Nishikata (西方 仁也, Nishikata Jin'ya) (born December 4, 1968) is a Japanese former ski jumper.

He competed from 1988 to 2001. He won a silver medal in the team large hill competition at the 1994 Winter Olympics in Lillehammer and followed that up with a bronze medal in the team large hill competition at the 1995 FIS Nordic World Ski Championships in Thunder Bay, Ontario.

Nishikata finished in the top three once in each of the four Cup World Cup seasons between 1993 and 1996.
