= Zbyněk Krompolc =

Czech ski jumper

Zbyněk Krompolc (born 29 May 1978 in Čeladná) is a Czech former ski jumper who competed from 1994 to 1999. At the 1994 Winter Olympics in Lillehammer, he finished seventh in the team large hill and 29th in the individual large hill events.

Krompolc competed at the 1995 FIS Nordic World Ski Championships in Thunder Bay, Ontario, finishing 55th in the individual normal hill event. His best career World Cup finish was fourth in a flying hill event in Norway in 1995.

After the Olympics, Krompolc continued to compete in ski jumping until 2002. He retired from the sport after the 2001–02 season.

Krompolc is married and has two children. He currently lives in Frenštát pod Radhoštěm, Czech Republic.
