= Andrey Bakhvalov =

Russian speed skater (born 1963)

Personal information
- Native name: Андрей Павлович Бахвалов
- Full name: Andrey Pavlovich Bakhvalov
- Nationality: Russian
- Born: 13 April 1963 (age 61); Moscow, Russian SFSR, Soviet Union

Sport
- Sport: Speed skating

Andrey Pavlovich Bakhvalov (Russian: Андрей Павлович Бахвалов; born 13 April 1963) is a Russian speed skater. He competed at the 1988 Winter Olympics, the 1992 Winter Olympics and the 1994 Winter Olympics.
