= Randy Weber (ski jumper) =

American ski jumper

Raymond "Randy" Weber (born May 22, 1977) is an American former ski jumper who competed in the 1994 Winter Olympics and in the 1998 Winter Olympics. He was born in Steamboat Springs, Colorado.

He was a member of the US Ski Team from 1994 until retirement in 1998. During those years he won 5 National Ski Jumping Titles (1994 Normal Hill, 1995 Normal Hill, 1996 Normal Hill and Large Hill, 1998 Normal Hill).

In addition to competing in the Olympic Games, he was a member of the World Junior Championship Teams in 1993 and 1995. He competed on the Continental Cup and World Cup Tours in each season between 1994 and 1998. His best performance on the World Cup tour came in December 1995 in Predazzo, Italy. He placed 6th on the Normal Hill. He also competed in the World Ski Flying Championships on the "Kulm" in Austria in 1996.
