= Lasse Ottesen =

Norwegian ski jumper

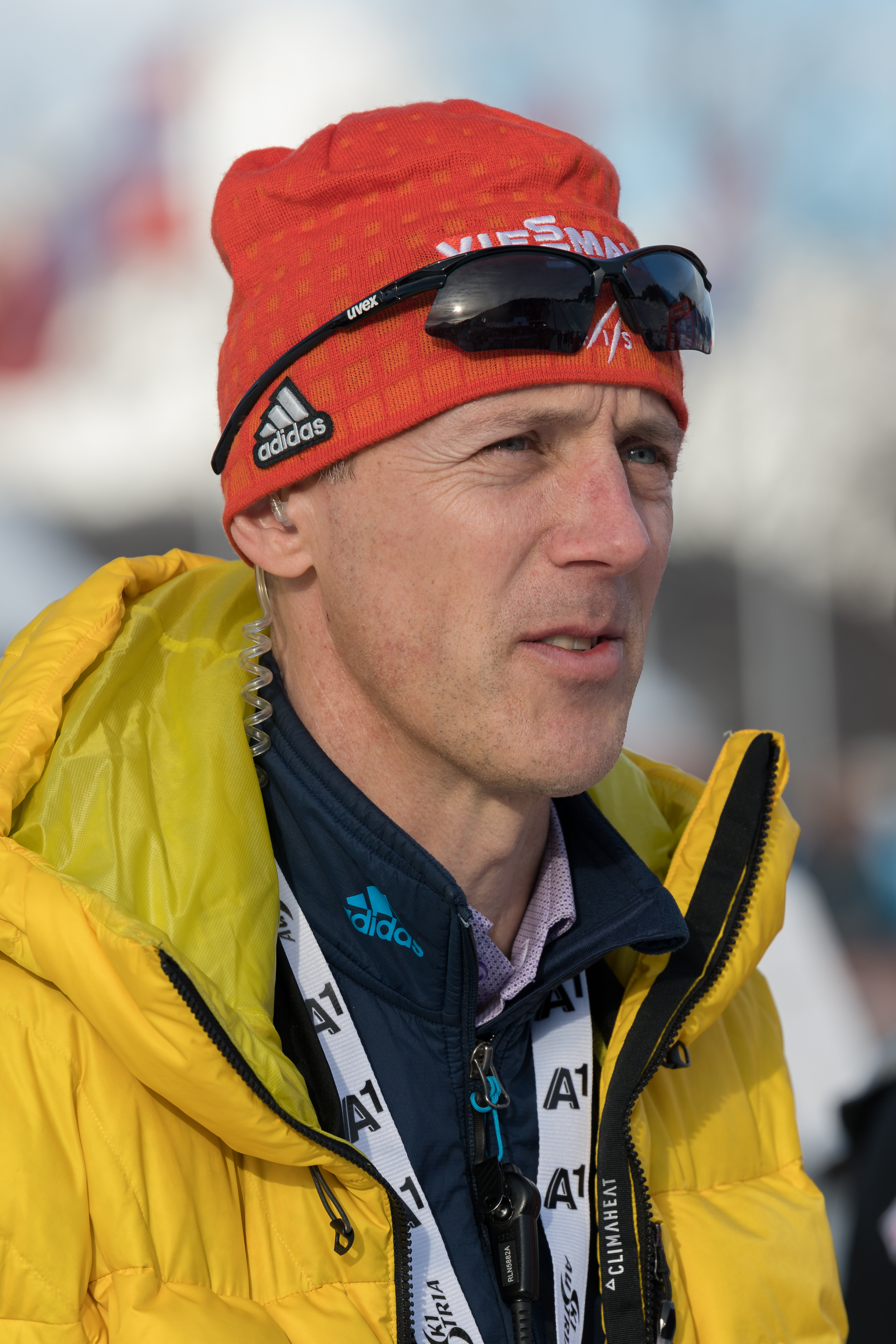

Personal information
- Nationality: Norway
- Born: 8 April 1974 (age 52) Oslo, Norway
- Height: 1.82 m (6 ft 0 in)

Sport
- Sport: Skiing
- Club: Aurskog-Finstadbru SK

World Cup career
- Seasons: 1991–2002
- Indiv. starts: 193
- Indiv. podiums: 9
Medal record
Men's ski jumping
Representing Norway
Olympic Games
Silver medal – second place	1994 Lillehammer	Normal hill – K90

Lasse Ottesen (born 8 April 1974) is a Norwegian former ski jumper who competed from 1991 to 2002.

== Career ==
He grew up in the little hamlet of Aurskog in eastern Norway and represented the local sports club Aurskog-Finstadbru SK.

His biggest success at the 1994 Winter Olympics in Lillehammer where he earned a silver medal in the Individual Normal Hill. Ottesen also finished 4th at the 1995 Nordic skiing World Championships in the Individual Large Hill. In 1997, he sat the world record in Planica with 212 meters.

After retiring, he became a coach. He was the ski jumping coach for the Nordic combined teams of Norway and then the United States, and later became the head coach for the United States.

Lasse is now Nordic combined director in the International Ski Federation (FIS). He’s work for FIS has been outstanding since he was offered the job in 2011, particularly he’s work for spearheading women’s Nordic Combined.

== Controversy ==
In the 1993/94 Four Hills Tournament, Ottesen was accused of helping his compatriot Espen Bredesen beat German Jens Weißflog. Weißflog was protecting an 8-point lead before the last jump, and the jumping order was Bredesen – Ottesen – Weißflog. After Bredesen's jump, Ottesen delayed his jump and was disqualified. The wind conditions being worsened, Weißflog lost 20 points on his last jump, lost the tourney and complained of foul play afterwards.

== Ski jumping world record ==
Date	Hill	Location	Metres	Feet
22 March 1997	Velikanka bratov Gorišek K185	Planica, Slovenia	212	696

Records
Preceded by Espen Bredesen	World's longest ski jump 22 March 1997 – 19 March 1999	Succeeded by Martin Schmitt
