= Roland Brunner =

Austrian speed skater (born 1970)

Roland Brunner (born August 12, 1970 in Klagenfurt, Carinthia) is a former ice speed skater from Austria, who represented his native country in three consecutive Winter Olympics, starting in 1992 in Albertville, France.
