= Aleksandr Golubev (speed skater) =

Russian speed skater

Personal information
- Full name: Aleksandr Vyacheslavovich Golubev
- Born: 19 May 1972 (age 54) Karavaievo, Soviet Union

Sport
- Sport: Speed skating
Medal record
Men's speed skating
Representing Russia
Olympic Games
Gold medal – first place	1994 Lillehammer	500 m

Aleksandr Vyacheslavovich Golubev (Russian: Александр Вячеславович Голубев; born 19 May 1972 in Karavaievo, Kostroma Oblast) is a former Russian speed skater. Very surprisingly he came to the top in the 500 m in Vikingskipet at the 1994 Winter Olympics in Lillehammer. He didn't place in the top three in any other international championship after that. He stands with one individual victory on 500 m in the World Cup from 1993.
