= Mikhail Yesin =

Soviet ski jumper

Personal information
- Nationality: Russian
- Born: 25 January 1968 (age 58)

Sport
- Sport: Ski jumping

Mikhail Yesin (born 25 January 1968) is a Russian ski jumper. He competed at the 1988 Winter Olympics, the 1992 Winter Olympics and the 1994 Winter Olympics.
