= Christian Moser (ski jumper) =

Austrian ski jumper

Medal record

Men's ski jumping

Representing Austria

Olympic Games
Bronze medal – third place	1994 Lillehammer	Team Large Hill

Christian Moser (born 20 December 1972 in Wiesbaden) is an Austrian former ski jumper who competed from 1990 to 1997. At the 1994 Winter Olympics of Lillehammer, he won a bronze medal in the Team Large Hill.

Moser's best World Cup finish was a second place in the Individual Normal Hill in Lahti in 1994.

As Stephan Zünd, Moser suffered from anorexia. He had a weight of just 58 kg at a height of 1,81 m and finally broke down. Moser talked openly about his problems and also the psychological pressure in ski jumping. He and Peter Baumgartl, doctor for the Austrian Ski Association, also reported about having heard of cases in other teams like the Norwegian and German (Ski jumping#Health risks).
