= Robert Meglič =

Slovenian former ski jumper (born 1974)

Personal information
- Full name: Robert Meglič
- Born: 4 November 1974 (age 51) Jesenice, Yugoslavia

Sport
- Sport: Skiing

World Cup career
- Seasons: 1993–1999
- Indiv. podiums: 1 Team
- Updated on 30 Mar 2015

Robert Meglič (born 4 November 1974) is a Slovenian former ski jumper. He competed at the 1994 Winter Olympics.
