= Figure skating at the 1994 Winter Olympics =

Figure skating at the XVII Olympic Winter Games
- Venue: Hamar Olympic Amphitheatre; Hamar, Norway
- Dates: 13–25 February 1994
- No. of events: 4
- Competitors: from 28 nations

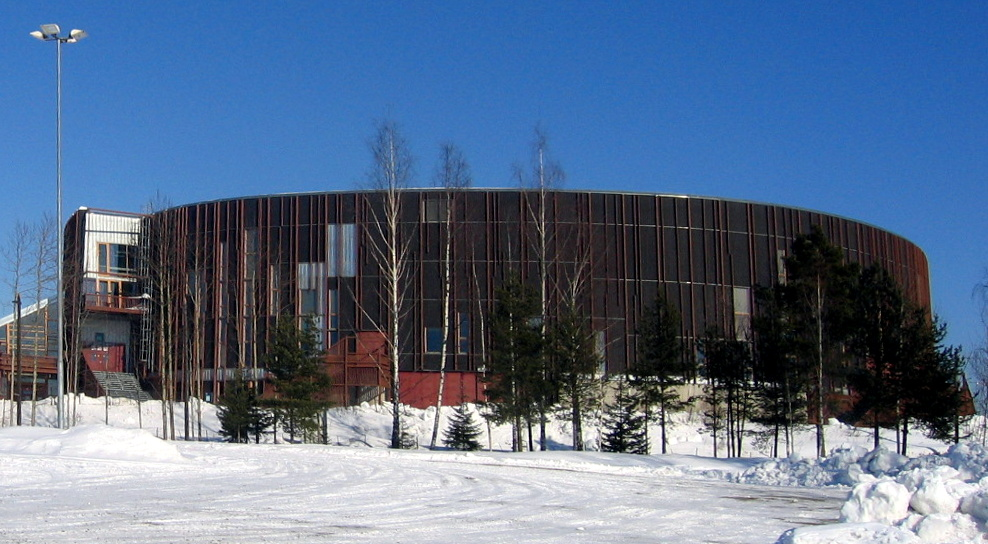
The figure skating events at the 1994 Winter Olympics were held at the Hamar Olympic Amphitheatre in Hamar, Norway.

The figure skating events at the 1994 Winter Olympics took place from 13 to 25 February 1994 at the Hamar Olympic Amphitheatre in Hamar, Norway. Medals were awarded in men's singles, women's singles, pair skating, and ice dance. Alexei Urmanov of Russia won the men's event, Oksana Baiul of Ukraine won the women's event, Ekaterina Gordeeva and Sergei Grinkov of Russia won the pairs event, and Oksana Grishuk and Evgeni Platov of Russia won the ice dance event. The figure skating events were overshadowed by media coverage of American skaters Nancy Kerrigan and Tonya Harding in the wake of Kerrigan's assault prior to the 1994 U.S. Figure Skating Championships. Kerrigan ultimately won the silver medal in the women's event, while Harding finished in eighth place.

== Background ==
Due to the calendar changes decided in 1986, the 1994 Winter Olympics took place two years after the previous Winter Olympics, which had been held in Albertville, France. Beginning in 1994, the Summer and Winter Olympics alternated every two years.

Although the 1994 Olympics were hosted in Lillehammer, Norway, the figure skating and short-track speed skating events were held at the Hamar Olympic Amphitheatre in Hamar. The amphitheatre was purposefully built for the 1994 Olympics. A separate Olympic Village was also built in Hamar for skaters.

As the host nation, Norway had the privilege of submitting entrants in events for which they may not have otherwise qualified. However, in 1992, the Norwegian Olympic Committee had announced that skaters aspiring to compete at the 1994 Olympics would need to finish in the top 12 at either the European or World Figure Skating Championships. The committee set similar requirements for all sports. Since no skater met this requirement, Norway declined to submit anyone to the Olympics.

Although Leslie and Cédric Monod's results at the 1993 World Championships allowed Switzerland to send two pairs to the Olympics, the Swiss Olympic Association elected not to send a pair after the Monods finished eleventh at the 1994 European Championships.

On 6 January 1994, one day before she was scheduled to compete at the 1994 U.S. Figure Skating Championships, Nancy Kerrigan was struck above the knee by an assailant with a baton and was forced to withdraw from the competition. Subsequent investigations determined that the assailant had been hired by the ex-husband of fellow skater Tonya Harding with the intention of preventing Kerrigan from competing at the U.S. Championships and the 1994 Winter Olympics.

== Entries ==
A total of four figure skating events were contested: men's singles, women's singles, pair skating, and ice dance. All events were held from 13 to 25 February at the Hamar Olympic Amphitheatre in Hamar, Norway.

Entries
Nation	Men	Women	Pairs	Ice dance	Ref.
Australia	Stephen Carr	—N/a	Danielle Carr; Stephen Carr	—N/a	
Belarus	Alexander Murashko	—N/a	Yelena Grigoryeva; Sergey Sheyko	Tatiana Navka; Samvel Gezalian	
Bulgaria	—N/a	Tsvetelina Abrasheva	—N/a		
Canada	Sébastien Britten	Josée Chouinard	Isabelle Brasseur; Lloyd Eisler	Shae-Lynn Bourne; Victor Kraatz	
Canada	Kurt Browning	Susan Humphreys	Jamie Salé; Jason Turner	—N/a	
Canada	Elvis Stojko	—N/a	Kristy Sargeant; Kris Wirtz	—N/a	
China	Zhang Min	Chen Lu	—N/a		
China	—N/a	Liu Ying	—N/a		
China	—N/a	Zhao Guona	—N/a		
Czech Republic	—N/a	Lenka Kulovaná	Radka Kovaříková; René Novotný	Radmila Chroboková; Milan Brzý	
Czech Republic	—N/a	Irena Zemanová	—N/a	Kateřina Mrázová; Martin Šimeček	
Denmark	Michael Tyllesen	—N/a			
Estonia	Margus Hernits	—N/a			
Finland	—N/a	Mila Kajas	—N/a	Susanna Rahkamo; Petri Kokko	
France	Philippe Candeloro	Surya Bonaly	—N/a	Sophie Moniotte; Pascal Lavanchy	
France	Éric Millot	Laëtitia Hubert	—N/a	Bérangère Nau; Luc Monéger	
France	—N/a	Marie-Pierre Leray	—N/a	—N/a	
Germany	—N/a	Tanja Szewczenko	Anuschka Gläser; Axel Rauschenbach	Jennifer Goolsbee; Hendryk Schamberger	
Germany	—N/a	Katarina Witt	Peggy Schwarz; Alexander König	—N/a	
Germany	—N/a	—N/a	Mandy Wötzel; Ingo Steuer	—N/a	
Great Britain	Steven Cousins	Charlene von Saher	Jacqueline Soames; John Jenkins	Jayne Torvill; Christopher Dean	
Hungary	—N/a	Krisztina Czakó	—N/a	Enikő Berkes; Szilárd Tóth	
Israel	Michael Shmerkin	—N/a			
Japan	Masakazu Kagiyama	Rena Inoue	—N/a		
Japan	Fumihiro Oikawa	Yuka Sato	—N/a		
Kazakhstan	—N/a			Elizaveta Stekolnikova; Dmitri Kazarlyga	
Latvia	Andrejs Vlaščenko	—N/a	Elena Berezhnaya; Oļegs Šļahovs	—N/a	
Lithuania	—N/a			Margarita Drobiazko; Povilas Vanagas	
Poland	—N/a	Anna Rechnio	—N/a	Agnieszka Domańska; Marcin Głowacki	
Romania	Cornel Gheorghe	—N/a			
Romania	Marius Negrea	—N/a			
Russia	Igor Pashkevich	—N/a	Ekaterina Gordeeva; Sergei Grinkov	Oksana Grishuk; Evgeni Platov	
Russia	Oleg Tataurov	—N/a	Natalia Mishkutionok; Artur Dmitriev	Anjelika Krylova; Vladimir Fedorov	
Russia	Alexei Urmanov	—N/a	Evgenia Shishkova; Vadim Naumov	Maya Usova; Alexander Zhulin	
South Africa	Dino Quattrocecere	—N/a			
South Korea	Jung Sung-Il	Lily Lyoonjung Lee	—N/a		
Spain	—N/a	Marta Andrade	—N/a		
Switzerland	—N/a	Nathalie Krieg	—N/a		
Ukraine	Viktor Petrenko	Oksana Baiul	Olena Bilousivska; Ihor Maliar	Svitlana Chernikova; Oleksandr Sosnenko	
Ukraine	—N/a	Lyudmyla Ivanova	—N/a	Irina Romanova; Igor Yaroshenko	
Ukraine	—N/a	Elena Liashenko	—N/a	—N/a	
United States	Brian Boitano	Tonya Harding	Karen Courtland; Todd Reynolds	Elizabeth Punsalan; Jerod Swallow	
United States	Scott Davis	Nancy Kerrigan	Kyoko Ina; Jason Dungjen	—N/a	
United States	—N/a		Jenni Meno; Todd Sand	—N/a	
Uzbekistan	—N/a			Dinara Nurdbayeva; Muslim Sattarov	
Uzbekistan	—N/a			Aliki Stergiadu; Juris Razgulajevs	

== Medal summary ==
=== Medalists ===
1994 Winter Olympic medalists
Discipline	Gold	Silver	Bronze	Ref.
Men's singles	Alexei Urmanov; Russia	Elvis Stojko; Canada	Philippe Candeloro; France	
Women's singles	Oksana Baiul; Ukraine	Nancy Kerrigan; United States	Chen Lu; China	
Pairs	Ekaterina Gordeeva; Sergei Grinkov; Russia	Natalia Mishkutionok; Artur Dmitriev; Russia	Isabelle Brasseur; Lloyd Eisler; Canada	
Ice dance	Oksana Grishuk; Evgeni Platov; Russia	Maya Usova; Alexander Zhulin; Russia	Jayne Torvill; Christopher Dean; Great Britain	

=== Medal table ===
Rank	Nation	Gold	Silver	Bronze	Total
1	Russia	3	2	0	5
2	Ukraine	1	0	0	1
3	Canada	0	1	1	2
4	United States	0	1	0	1
5	China	0	0	1	1
5	France	0	0	1	1
5	Great Britain	0	0	1	1
Totals (7 entries)		4	4	4	12

== In film ==
Tonya Harding's and Nancy Kerrigan's participation in the competition is part of the story of the 2017 American film I, Tonya.
