= Speed skating at the 1994 Winter Olympics – Women's 1000 metres =

Women's 1000 metres at the XVII Olympic Winter Games
- Pictogram for speed skating
- Venue: Hamar Olympic Hall
- Dates: February 23, 1994
- Competitors: 36 from 12 nations
- Winning time: 1:18.74

Medalists
1st place, gold medalist(s)		Bonnie Blair; United States
2nd place, silver medalist(s)		Anke Baier; Germany
3rd place, bronze medalist(s)		Ye Qiaobo; China

The women's 1000 metres in speed skating at the 1994 Winter Olympics took place on 23 February, at the Hamar Olympic Hall.

== Records ==
Prior to this competition, the existing world and Olympic records were as follows:

World record	Christa Rothenburger (GDR)	1:17.65	Calgary, Canada	26 February 1988
Olympic record	Christa Rothenburger (GDR)	1:17.65	Calgary, Canada	26 February 1988

== Results ==
Rank	Pair	Lane	Name	Country	Time	Behind
1st place, gold medalist(s)	2	O	Bonnie Blair	United States	1:18.74	-
2nd place, silver medalist(s)	3	I	Anke Baier	Germany	1:20.12	+1.38
3rd place, bronze medalist(s)	2	I	Ye Qiaobo	China	1:20.22	+1.48
4	6	I	Franziska Schenk	Germany	1:20.25	+1.51
5	5	O	Monique Garbrecht	Germany	1:20.32	+1.58
6	5	I	Shiho Kusunose	Japan	1:20.37	+1.63
7	11	O	Emese Hunyady	Austria	1:20.42	+1.68
8	3	O	Susan Auch	Canada	1:20.72	+1.98
9	12	I	Oksana Ravilova	Russia	1:20.82	+2.08
10	15	I	Nataliya Polozkova	Russia	1:20.84	+2.10
11	9	O	Svetlana Fedotkina	Russia	1:20.89	+2.15
12	4	O	Angela Stahnke	Germany	1:20.93	+2.19
12	6	O	Xue Ruihong	China	1:20.93	+2.19
14	11	I	Annamarie Thomas	Netherlands	1:20.94	+2.20
15	1	O	Yoo Seon-Hee	South Korea	1:21.40	+2.66
16	16	I	Jin Hua	China	1:21.48	+2.74
17	8	I	Mihaela Dascălu	Romania	1:21.94	+3.20
18	4	I	Kyoko Shimazaki	Japan	1:21.96	+3.22
19	1	I	Catriona Le May Doan	Canada	1:21.98	+3.24
20	10	I	Christine Aaftink	Netherlands	1:22.16	+3.42
21	7	O	Seiko Hashimoto	Japan	1:22.31	+3.57
22	13	I	Emese Dörfler-Antal	Austria	1:22.34	+3.60
23	17	I	Chris Witty	United States	1:22.42	+3.68
24	14	I	Michelle Kline	United States	1:22.44	+3.70
24	18	I	Svetlana Zhurova	Russia	1:22.44	+3.70
26	9	I	Edel Therese Høiseth	Norway	1:22.98	+4.24
27	8	O	Mayumi Yamamoto	Japan	1:23.15	+4.41
28	10	O	Cerasela Hordobețiu	Romania	1:23.19	+4.45
28	16	O	Ingrid Liepa	Canada	1:23.19	+4.53
30	12	O	Yang Chunyuan	China	1:23.27	+4.53
31	7	I	Chantal Bailey	United States	1:23.52	+4.78
32	13	O	Gang Mi-yeong	South Korea	1:24.19	+5.45
33	14	O	Michelle Morton	Canada	1:24.41	+5.67
34	18	O	Krisztina Egyed	Hungary	1:24.71	+5.97
35	17	O	Cheon Hui-ju	South Korea	1:25.67	+6.93
36	15	O	Jeong Bae-yeong	South Korea	1:25.93	+7.19
