= Biathlon at the 1994 Winter Olympics – Women's sprint =

Women's biathlon sprint at the XVII Olympic Winter Games
- Venue: Birkebeineren Ski Stadium
- Dates: 23 February 1994
- Competitors: 69 from 28 nations
- Winning time: 26:08.8

Medalists
1st place, gold medalist(s)		Myriam Bédard	Canada
2nd place, silver medalist(s)		Svetlana Paramygina	Belarus
3rd place, bronze medalist(s)		Valentina Tserbe	Ukraine

The Women's 7.5 kilometre sprint biathlon competition at the 1994 Winter Olympics was held on 23 February, at Birkebeineren Ski Stadium. Each miss was penalized by requiring the competitor to race over a 150-metre penalty loop.

== Results ==
Rank	Bib	Name	Country	Time	Penalties	Deficit
1st place, gold medalist(s)	56	Myriam Bédard	Canada	26:08.8	2 (0+2)	—
2nd place, silver medalist(s)	55	Svetlana Paramygina	Belarus	26:09.9	2 (2+0)	+1.1
3rd place, bronze medalist(s)	10	Valentina Tserbe	Ukraine	26:10.0	0 (0+0)	+1.2
4	62	Inna Sheshkil	Kazakhstan	26:13.9	2 (0+2)	+5.1
5	4	Petra Schaaf	Germany	26:33.6	2 (2+0)	+24.8
6	33	Irina Kokuyeva	Belarus	26:38.4	2 (0+2)	+29.6
7	67	Nathalie Santer	Italy	26:38.8	3 (1+2)	+30.0
8	50	Simone Greiner-Petter-Memm	Germany	26:46.5	3 (3+0)	+37.7
9	65	Eva Háková	Czech Republic	26:48.2	1 (1+0)	+39.4
10	69	Elin Kristiansen	Norway	26:53.5	0 (0+0)	+44.7
11	30	Iva Karagiozova	Bulgaria	27:00.6	0 (0+0)	+51.8
12	41	Soňa Mihoková	Slovakia	27:03.8	2 (1+1)	+55.0
13	24	Uschi Disl	Germany	27:04.1	2 (1+1)	+55.3
14	46	Olena Ohurtsova	Ukraine	27:06.8	2 (1+1)	+58.0
15	66	Martina Jašicová	Slovakia	27:11.6	2 (1+1)	+1:02.8
16	64	Mari Lampinen	Finland	27:14.5	2 (2+0)	+1:05.7
17	6	Ann-Elen Skjelbreid	Norway	27:17.7	1 (0+1)	+1:08.9
18	47	Andreja Grašič	Slovenia	27:17.9	3 (2+1)	+1:09.1
19	9	Nadezhda Talanova	Russia	27:18.1	2 (1+1)	+1:09.3
20	13	Véronique Claudel	France	27:28.2	1 (1+0)	+1:19.4
21	57	Kerryn Pethybridge-Rim	Australia	27:32.3	2 (0+2)	+1:23.5
22	20	Annette Sikveland	Norway	27:32.8	2 (1+1)	+1:24.0
23	63	Song Aiqin	China	27:33.5	1 (0+1)	+1:24.7
24	38	Joan Smith	United States	27:39.1	2 (0+2)	+1:30.3
24	43	Tuija Sikiö	Finland	27:39.1	0 (0+0)	+1:30.3
26	27	Antje Harvey	Germany	27:46.5	3 (0+3)	+1:37.7
27	31	Corinne Niogret	France	27:48.1	3 (2+1)	+1:39.3
28	35	Ieva Cederštre-ma-Volfa	Latvia	27:52.6	3 (1+2)	+1:43.8
29	59	Ekaterina Dafovska	Bulgaria	27:54.4	1 (0+1)	+1:45.6
30	49	Anne Briand	France	28:00.8	4 (4+0)	+1:52.0
31	53	Eveli Peterson	Estonia	28:03.8	1 (1+0)	+1:55.0
32	48	Anfisa Reztsova	Russia	28:09.8	7 (2+5)	+2:01.0
33	58	Maryna Skolota	Ukraine	28:11.3	3 (2+1)	+2:02.5
34	26	Iveta Knížková	Czech Republic	28:18.3	3 (1+2)	+2:09.5
35	5	Emmanuelle Claret	France	28:19.7	5 (1+4)	+2:10.9
36	22	Tuija Vuoksiala	Finland	28:23.2	3 (2+1)	+2:14.4
37	44	Lise Meloche	Canada	28:25.0	1 (1+0)	+2:16.2
38	17	Nataliya Permyakova	Belarus	28:26.9	4 (2+2)	+2:18.1
39	25	Luiza Noskova	Russia	28:27.8	5 (3+2)	+2:19.0
40	29	Sandra Paintin	Australia	28:31.1	1 (0+1)	+2:22.3
41	37	Wang Jinfen	China	28:36.1	5 (3+2)	+2:27.3
42	7	Lyubov Belyakova	Russia	28:37.0	2 (2+0)	+2:28.2
43	11	Ileana Ianoşiu-Hangan	Romania	28:37.1	2 (1+1)	+2:28.3
44	34	Yoshiko Honda-Mikami	Japan	28:37.3	2 (1+1)	+2:28.5
45	18	Gillian Hamilton	Canada	28:43.0	2 (0+2)	+2:34.2
46	45	Anna Bozsik	Hungary	29:04.4	2 (0+2)	+2:55.6
47	39	Hildegunn Fossen	Norway	29:16.2	4 (2+2)	+3:07.4
48	54	Kazimiera Strolienė	Lithuania	29:16.6	4 (2+2)	+3:07.8
49	15	Jiřína Pelcová	Czech Republic	29:23.0	3 (0+3)	+3:14.2
50	1	Lyudmila Lysenko	Belarus	29:24.0	3 (2+1)	+3:15.2
51	61	Beth Coats	United States	29:24.3	3 (3+0)	+3:15.5
52	14	Mariya Manolova	Bulgaria	29:26.7	2 (0+2)	+3:17.9
52	16	Joan Guetschow	United States	29:26.7	4 (1+3)	+3:17.9
54	12	María Giro	Argentina	29:31.9	1 (0+1)	+3:23.1
55	42	Adina Țuțulan-Șotropa	Romania	29:34.8	3 (2+1)	+3:26.0
56	23	Jelena Poljakova-Všivtseva	Estonia	29:35.3	3 (3+0)	+3:26.5
57	52	Halina Pitoń	Poland	29:39.2	4 (2+2)	+3:30.4
58	36	Krista Lepik	Estonia	29:40.1	5 (2+3)	+3:31.3
59	51	Catarina Eklund	Sweden	29:44.6	2 (2+0)	+3:35.8
60	19	Eva-Karin Westin	Sweden	29:50.4	2 (2+0)	+3:41.6
61	3	Pirjo Aalto	Finland	29:59.2	3 (0+3)	+3:50.4
62	21	Anna Stera-Kustucz	Poland	30:04.5	3 (2+1)	+3:55.7
63	8	Gabriela Suvová	Czech Republic	30:25.8	4 (2+2)	+4:17.0
64	2	Mary Ostergren	United States	30:35.6	4 (3+1)	+4:26.8
65	60	Brigitta Bereczki	Hungary	30:42.4	4 (0+4)	+4:33.6
66	68	Yevgeniya Roppel	Kyrgyzstan	31:08.0	3 (1+2)	+4:59.2
67	32	Christina Eklund	Sweden	31:10.0	5 (4+1)	+5:01.2
68	28	Zofia Kiełpińska	Poland	31:11.1	7 (4+3)	+5:02.3
69	40	Elena Gorohova	Moldova	35:04.1	7 (4+3)	+8:55.3
