= Canada at the 1994 Winter Olympics =

- IOC code: CAN
- NOC: Canadian Olympic Committee
- Website: www.olympic.ca (in English and French)

in Lillehammer, Norway 12 February 1994 – 27 February 1994
- Competitors: 94 (65 men and 29 women) in 10 sports
- Flag bearer: Kurt Browning
- Medals Ranked 7th: Gold 3 Silver 6 Bronze 4 Total 13

Winter Olympics appearances (overview)
- 1924; 1928; 1932; 1936; 1948; 1952; 1956; 1960; 1964; 1968; 1972; 1976; 1980; 1984; 1988; 1992; 1994; 1998; 2002; 2006; 2010; 2014; 2018; 2022; 2026

Canada competed at the 1994 Winter Olympics in Lillehammer, Norway. Canada has competed at every Winter Olympic Games.

== Medalists ==
Medal	Name	Sport	Event	Date
Gold	Jean-Luc Brassard	Freestyle skiing	Men's moguls	16 February
Gold	Myriam Bédard	Biathlon	Women's individual	18 February
Gold	Myriam Bédard	Biathlon	Women's sprint	23 February
Silver	Susan Auch	Speed skating	Women's 500 metres	19 February
Silver	Elvis Stojko	Figure skating	Men's singles	19 February
Silver	Christine Boudrias; Isabelle Charest; Angela Cutrone; Sylvie Daigle	Short track speed skating	Women's 3000 metre relay	22 February
Silver	Philippe Laroche	Freestyle skiing	Men's aerials	24 February
Silver	Nathalie Lambert	Short track speed skating	Women's 1000 metres	26 February
Silver	Canada men's national ice hockey team: Corey Hirsch; Adrian Aucoin; Derek Mayer; Brad Werenka; Ken Lovsin; Todd Hlushko; Fabian Joseph; Brad Schlegel; Paul Kariya; Dwayne Norris; Greg Johnson; Brian Savage; Wally Schreiber; Todd Warriner; Greg Parks; Petr Nedvěd; Mark Astley; Jean-Yves Roy; Chris Kontos; David Harlock; Manny Legace; Allain Roy; Chris Therien	Ice hockey	Men's tournament	27 February
Bronze	Ed Podivinsky	Alpine skiing	Men's downhill	13 February
Bronze	Isabelle Brasseur; Lloyd Eisler	Figure skating	Pairs	15 February
Bronze	Marc Gagnon	Short track speed skating	Men's 1000 metres	22 February
Bronze	Lloyd Langlois	Freestyle skiing	Men's aerials	24 February

== Competitors ==
The following is the list of number of competitors in the Games.

Sport	Men	Women	Total
Alpine skiing	7	4	11
Biathlon	2	5	7
Bobsleigh	8	–	8
Cross-country skiing	1	0	1
Figure skating	7	6	13
Freestyle skiing	6	5	11
Ice hockey	21	–	21
Luge	2	0	2
Short track speed skating	4	4	8
Speed skating	8	5	13
Total	66	29	95

== Alpine skiing ==
Men

Athlete	Event	Run 1 (DH)		Run 2 (Sl)		Run 3 (Sl)		Final/Total		
Athlete	Event	Time	Rank	Time	Rank	Time	Rank	Time	Diff	Rank
Rob Crossan	Giant slalom	1:30.85	23	1:25.25	20	—N/a		2:56.10	+3.64	20
Rob Crossan	Slalom	1:03.45	17	did not finish		—N/a		did not finish		
Thomas Grandi	Giant slalom	1:29.97	17	1:24.79	17	—N/a		2:54.76	+2.30	16
Thomas Grandi	Slalom	1:03.48	18	1:02.06	12	—N/a		2:05.54	+3.52	14
Cary Mullen	Downhill	—N/a						did not finish		
Cary Mullen	Super-G	—N/a						1:34.84	+2.31	24
Cary Mullen	Combined	1:37.33	4	did not finish						
Ed Podivinsky	Downhill	—N/a						1:45.87	+0.12	3rd place, bronze medalist(s)
Ed Podivinsky	Super-G	—N/a						did not finish		
Ed Podivinsky	Combined	1:37.45	5	did not finish						
Luke Sauder	Downhill	—N/a						1:47.45	+1.70	27
Ralf Socher	Downhill	—N/a						1:47.93	+2.18	31
Ralf Socher	Super-G	—N/a						did not finish		
Brian Stemmle	Super-G	—N/a						1:34.99	+2.46	26

Women

Athlete	Event	Run 1 (DH)		Run 2 (Sl)		Run 3 (Sl)		Final/Total		
Athlete	Event	Time	Rank	Time	Rank	Time	Rank	Time	Diff	Rank
Kerrin Lee-Gartner	Downhill	—N/a						1:38.22	+2.29	19
Kerrin Lee-Gartner	Super-G	—N/a						1:22.98	+0.83	8
Michelle McKendry	Downhill	—N/a						1:38.88	+2.95	30
Michelle McKendry	Super-G	—N/a						1:24.13	+1.98	25
Michelle McKendry	Combined	1:29.92	20	did not finish						
Kate Pace	Downhill	—N/a						1:37.17	+1.24	5
Kate Pace	Super-G	—N/a						1:23.22	+1.07	12
Mélanie Turgeon	Giant slalom	1:25.10	30	did not finish		—N/a		did not finish		
Mélanie Turgeon	Slalom	did not finish				—N/a		did not finish		

== Biathlon ==
Men

Athlete	Event	Final		
Athlete	Event	Time	Misses	Rank
Steve Cyr	Individual	1:02:20.7	6	43
Steve Cyr	Sprint	30:41.2	3	26
Glenn Rupertus	Individual	1:03:05.9	5	49
Glenn Rupertus	Sprint	32:47.7	5	62

Women

Athlete	Event	Final		
Athlete	Event	Time	Misses	Rank
Myriam Bédard	Individual	52:06.6	2	1st place, gold medalist(s)
Myriam Bédard	Sprint	26:08.8	2	1st place, gold medalist(s)
Kristin Berg	Individual	59:36.5	6	51
Gillian Hamilton	Sprint	28:43.0	2	45
Lise Meloche	Individual	55:27.4	2	18
Lise Meloche	Sprint	28:25.0	1	37
Jane Isakson; Myriam Bédard; Kristin Berg; Lise Meloche	Relay	2:02:22.7	6	15

== Bobsleigh ==
Athlete	Event	Run 1		Run 2		Run 3		Run 4		Total	
Athlete	Event	Time	Rank	Time	Rank	Time	Rank	Time	Rank	Time	Rank
Chris Lori; Glenroy Gilbert	Two-man	52.99	12	53.72	22	53.22	14	53.56	15	3:33.49	15
Pierre Lueders; Dave MacEachern	Two-man	52.63	4	53.25	8	53.11	11	53.19	4	3:32.18	7
Chris Lori; Chris Farstad; Sheridon Baptiste; Glenroy Gilbert	Four-man	52.11	10	52.32	11	52.57	14	52.56	12	3:29.56	11
Pierre Lueders; Dave MacEachern; Jack Pyc; Pascal Caron	Four-man	52.22	11	52.51	17	52.31	7	52.53	11	3:29.57	12

== Cross-country skiing ==
Athlete	Event	Race	
Athlete	Event	Time	Rank
Dany Bouchard	10 km classical	27:09.5	49
Dany Bouchard	15 km freestyle pursuit	1:07:33.2	52
Dany Bouchard	30 km freestyle	1:23:06.9	50
Dany Bouchard	50 km classical	2:23:09.0	51

== Figure skating ==
Athlete(s)	Event	CD1	CD2	SP/OD	FS/FD	Total	
Athlete(s)	Event	FP	FP	FP	FP	TFP	Rank
Sébastien Britten	Men's	—N/a		10 Q	10	15.0	10
Kurt Browning	Men's	—N/a		12 Q	3	9.0	5
Elvis Stojko	Men's	—N/a		2 Q	2	3.0	2nd place, silver medalist(s)
Josée Chouinard	Ladies'	—N/a		8 Q	9	13.0	9
Susan Humphreys	Ladies'	—N/a		26	did not advance		
Isabelle Brasseur & Lloyd Eisler	Pairs	—N/a		3	3	4.5	3rd place, bronze medalist(s)
Kristy Sargeant & Kris Wirtz	Pairs	—N/a		11	10	15.5	10
Jamie Salé & Jason Turner	Pairs	—N/a		14	12	19.0	12
Shae-Lynn Bourne & Victor Kraatz	Ice dancing	10	10	10	10	20.0	10

== Freestyle skiing ==
Men

Athlete	Event	Qualifying		Final	
Athlete	Event	Points	Rank	Points	Rank
Jean-Luc Brassard	Moguls	26.78	1 Q	27.24	1st place, gold medalist(s)
Andy Capicik	Aerials	207.29	6 Q	219.07	4
Nicolas Fontaine	Aerials	206.64	7 Q	210.81	6
Lloyd Langlois	Aerials	221.61	3 Q	222.44	3rd place, bronze medalist(s)
Philippe LaRoche	Aerials	222.65	2 Q	228.63	2nd place, silver medalist(s)
John Smart	Moguls	25.47	6 Q	24.96	7

Women

Athlete	Event	Qualifying		Final	
Athlete	Event	Points	Rank	Points	Rank
Genevieve Fortin	Moguls	21.72	19	did not advance	
Katherina Kubenk	Aerials	115.01	19	did not advance	
Katherina Kubenk	Moguls	22.24	15 Q	21.08	16
Caroline Olivier	Aerials	153.03	4 Q	138.96	8
Julie Steggall	Moguls	18.43	23	did not advance	
Bronwen Thomas	Moguls	23.40	9 Q	23.57	9

== Ice hockey ==
- Team roster:
  - Mark Astley
  - Adrian Aucoin
  - David Harlock
  - Corey Hirsch
  - Todd Hlushko
  - Greg Johnson
  - Fabian Joseph
  - Paul Kariya
  - Chris Kontos
  - Ken Lovsin
  - Derek Mayer
  - Petr Nedvěd
  - Dwayne Norris
  - Greg Parks
  - Jean-Yves Roy
  - Brian Savage
  - Brad Schlegel
  - Wally Schreiber
  - Chris Therien
  - Todd Warriner
  - Brad Werenka

Head coach: Tom Renney

Group B

Team	GP	W	L	T	GF	GA	PTS
Slovakia	5	3	0	2	26	14	8
Canada	5	3	1	1	17	11	7
Sweden	5	3	1	1	23	13	7
United States	5	1	1	3	21	17	5
Italy	5	1	4	0	15	31	2
France	5	0	4	1	11	27	1

- February 13

Canada	7:2	Italy

- February 15

Canada	3:1	France

- February 17

United States	3:3	Canada

- February 19

Slovakia	3:1	Canada

- February 21

Canada	3:2	Sweden

Medal Round
Quarter-finals

February 23; 15:00	Canada	3-2 (OT) (0-1, 1-0, 1-1, 1-0)	Czech Republic	Gjøvik; Attendance: 3,500

Game reference
Referee: (Finland) Mika Lepaus

Semi-finals

February 25; 19:30	Finland	3-5 (0-0, 2-2, 1-3)	Canada	Gjøvik; Attendance: 5,237

Game reference

Referee:
(United States) Rob Hearn

Saku Koivu − 22.08	1-0
Esa Keskinen − 23.48	2-0
	2-1	35.59 − Todd Hlushko
	2-2	39.24 − Petr Nedvěd
	2-3	44.27 − Brad Werenka
	2-4	47.30 − Jean-Yves Roy
	2-5	54.19 − Greg Parks
Jere Lehtinen − 59.25	3-5

Gold Medal Game

February 27; 15:15	Sweden	3-2 (SO) (1-0, 0-0, 1-2)	Canada	Lillehammer; Attendance: 9,187

Game reference

Tommy Salo
Goalies
Corey Hirsch
Referee:
(United States) Rob Hearn

Tomas Jonsson − 06:10	1-0
	1-1	49:08 − Paul Kariya
	1-2	51:43 − Derek Mayer
Magnus Svensson − 58:11	2-2

10 min
Penalties
10 min

== Luge ==
Athlete(s)	Event	Run 1	Run 2	Run 3	Run 4	Total	
Athlete(s)	Event	Time	Time	Time	Time	Time	Rank
Clay Ives	Men's	51.518	51.822	51.699	51.647	3:26.686	20
Bob Gasper; Clay Ives	Doubles	48.899	48.792	—N/a		1:37.691	8

== Short track speed skating ==
Men

Athlete	Event	Heat		Quarterfinal		Semifinal		Final	
Athlete	Event	Time	Rank	Time	Rank	Time	Rank	Time	Rank
Frédéric Blackburn	500m	44.38	2 Q	45.20	1 Q	44.40	3 QB	Final B 44.97	5
Frédéric Blackburn	1000m	1:32.11	1 Q	1:30.83	1 Q	1:41.71	3 QB	Final B Disqualified	
Derrick Campbell	500m	44.72	1 Q	1:20.27	4	did not advance			
Derrick Campbell	1000m	1:33.00	1 Q	1:31.82	2 Q	1:36.12	3 Q	did not finish	
Marc Gagnon	500m	44.69 OR	1 Q	43.84 OR	1 Q	44.08	1 Q	52.74	4
Marc Gagnon	1000m	1:32.52	1 Q	1:31.93	1 Q	2:16.27	4 QB	B Final; 1:33.03	3rd place, bronze medalist(s)
Frédéric Blackburn; Derrick Campbell; Marc Gagnon; Stephen Gough	5000m relay	—N/a				7:13.76	1 Q	7:20.40	4

Women

Athlete	Event	Heat		Quarterfinal		Semifinal		Final	
Athlete	Event	Time	Rank	Time	Rank	Time	Rank	Time	Rank
Isabelle Charest	500m	46.92	1 Q	47.25	1 Q	Disqualified			
Isabelle Charest	1000m	1:39.55 OR	1 Q	1:40.29	1 Q	1:37.89	3 QB	Final B 1:37.49	6
Sylvie Daigle	500m	46.98	1 Q	55.59	3	did not advance			
Sylvie Daigle	1000m	1:41.88 OR	1 Q	1:31.828	1 Q	Disqualified			
Nathalie Lambert	500m	47.38	2 Q	1:05.45	4	did not advance			
Nathalie Lambert	1000m	1:40.45	1 Q	1:38.75 OR	1 Q	1:38.82	1 Q	1:36.97	2nd place, silver medalist(s)
Christine Boudrias; Isabelle Charest; Sylvie Daigle; Nathalie Lambert	3000m relay	—N/a				4:26.94 OR	1 Q	4:32.04	2nd place, silver medalist(s)

== Speed skating ==
Men

Athlete	Event	Final	
Athlete	Event	Time	Rank
Pat Bouchard	1500 m	1:59.83	38
Sylvain Bouchard	500 m	37.01	11
Sylvain Bouchard	1000 m	1:13.56	5
Mike Hall	5000 m	6:59.58	22
Mike Ireland	500 m	37.67	26
Sean Ireland	500 m	37.30	17
Sean Ireland	1000 m	1:14.31	16
Pat Kelly	500 m	37.07	12
Pat Kelly	1000 m	1:13.67	6
Pat Kelly	1500 m	1:55.81	24
Neal Marshall	1500 m	1:53.56	7
Neal Marshall	5000 m	6:58.44	17
Kevin Scott	1000 m	1:13.82	10
Kevin Scott	1500 m	1:56.68	28

Women

Athlete	Event	Final	
Athlete	Event	Time	Rank
Susan Auch	500 m	39.61	2nd place, silver medalist(s)
Susan Auch	1000 m	1:20.72	8
Linda Johnson	500 m	41.42	26
Catriona Le May Doan	500 m	59.75	33
Catriona Le May Doan	1000 m	1:21.98	19
Catriona Le May Doan	1500 m	2:07.19	17
Ingrid Liepa	1000 m	1:23.19	28
Ingrid Liepa	1500 m	2:09.97	28
Ingrid Liepa	3000 m	4:28.28	14
Ingrid Liepa	5000 m	7:49.39	16
Michelle Morton	500 m	40.71	16
Michelle Morton	1000 m	1:24.41	33
Michelle Morton	1500 m	2:08.53	24
