= Biathlon at the 1994 Winter Olympics – Women's individual =

Women's individual at the XVII Olympic Winter Games
- Venue: Birkebeineren Ski Stadium
- Dates: 18 February 1994
- Competitors: 69 from 28 nations
- Winning time: 52:06.6

Medalists
1st place, gold medalist(s)		Myriam Bédard	Canada
2nd place, silver medalist(s)		Anne Briand	France
3rd place, bronze medalist(s)		Uschi Disl	Germany

The Women's biathlon 15 km individual competition of the Lillehammer 1994 Olympics was held at Birkebeineren Ski Stadium on 18 February 1994.

== Results ==
Rank	Bib	Name	Country	Ski Time	Penalties	Result	Deficit
1st place, gold medalist(s)	67	Myriam Bédard	Canada	50:06.6	2 (0+1+0+1)	52:06.6	—
2nd place, silver medalist(s)	64	Anne Briand	France	49:53.3	3 (1+1+0+1)	52:53.3	+46.7
3rd place, bronze medalist(s)	14	Uschi Disl	Germany	50:15.3	3 (2+0+0+1)	53:15.3	+1:08.7
4	52	Svetlana Paramygina	Belarus	49:21.3	4 (3+1+0+0)	53:21.3	+1:14.7
5	15	Corinne Niogret	France	51:38.1	2 (1+0+1+0)	53:38.1	+1:31.5
6	34	Martina Jašicová	Slovakia	51:56.4	2 (0+0+1+1)	53:56.4	+1:49.8
7	10	Natalia Permiakova	Belarus	51:59.2	2 (1+1+0+0)	53:59.2	+1:52.6
8	46	Kerryn Rim	Australia	52:10.1	2 (1+1+0+0)	54:10.1	+2:03.5
9	44	Antje Harvey	Germany	51:12.4	3 (0+1+0+2)	54:12.4	+2:05.8
10	66	Luiza Noskova	Russia	50:18.2	4 (0+3+0+1)	54:18.2	+2:11.6
11	4	Delphyne Heymann	France	53:21.8	1 (0+0+1+0)	54:21.8	+2:15.2
12	53	Elena Ogurtsova	Ukraine	50:40.4	4 (0+1+2+1)	54:40.4	+2:33.8
13	37	Nadiya Billova	Ukraine	51:44.3	3 (1+0+1+1)	54:44.3	+2:37.7
14	40	Joan Smith	United States	51:46.7	3 (0+1+1+1)	54:46.7	+2:40.1
15	58	Petra Schaaf	Germany	49:52.9	5 (2+2+0+1)	54:52.9	+2:46.3
16	2	Nadezhda Talanova	Russia	50:14.0	5 (1+2+1+1)	55:14.0	+3:07.4
17	3	Joan Guetschow	United States	54:19.4	1 (0+0+0+1)	55:19.4	+3:12.8
18	29	Adina Țuțulan-Șotropa	Romania	54:27.4	1 (0+0+0+1)	55:27.4	+3:20.8
18	42	Lise Meloche	Canada	53:27.4	2 (0+0+0+2)	55:27.4	+3:20.8
20	33	Véronique Claudel	France	53:40.6	2 (0+0+2+0)	55:40.6	+3:34.0
21	49	Hildegunn Fossen	Norway	52:55.4	3 (0+3+0+0)	55:55.4	+3:48.8
22	39	Mariya Manolova	Bulgaria	53:58.2	2 (1+1+0+0)	55:58.2	+3:52.1
22	13	Natalya Snytina	Russia	51:58.7	4 (2+1+1+0)	55:58.7	+3:52.1
24	63	Wang Jinfen	China	51:00.8	5 (0+2+0+3)	56:00.8	+3:54.2
25	61	Nathalie Santer	Italy	48:07.4	8 (2+2+1+3)	56:07.4	+4:00.8
26	30	Anfisa Reztsova	Russia	48:10.2	8 (1+1+3+3)	56:10.2	+4:03.6
27	45	Eveli Peterson	Estonia	53:11.0	3 (0+2+0+1)	56:11.0	+4:04.4
28	7	Irina Kokoueva	Belarus	50:12.0	6 (1+3+1+1)	56:12.0	+4:05.4
29	31	Inna Sheshkil	Kazakhstan	51:16.5	5 (1+3+1+0)	56:16.5	+4:09.9
30	47	Ieva Volfa	Latvia	52:03.8	5 (1+2+1+1)	57:03.8	+4:57.2
31	62	Elin Kristiansen	Norway	54:04.2	3 (1+1+0+1)	57:04.2	+4:57.6
32	12	Laurie Tavares	United States	53:04.3	4 (1+1+1+1)	57:04.3	+4:57.7
33	57	Beth Coats	United States	53:20.0	4 (1+1+1+1)	57:20.0	+5:13.4
34	50	Iveta Knížková	Czech Republic	51:23.7	6 (2+1+2+1)	57:23.7	+5:17.1
35	41	Eva Háková	Czech Republic	51:43.2	6 (2+0+4+0)	57:43.2	+5:36.6
36	8	Simone Greiner-Petter-Memm	Germany	51:06.5	7 (1+2+2+2)	58:06.5	+5:59.9
37	23	Jiřína Pelcová	Czech Republic	55:07.3	3 (1+0+0+2)	58:07.3	+6:00.7
38	5	Tuija Sikiö	Finland	53:13.1	5 (2+1+2+0)	58:13.1	+6:06.5
39	43	Song Aiqin	China	53:25.0	5 (1+0+1+3)	58:25.0	+6:18.4
40	69	Soňa Mihoková	Slovakia	51:46.5	7 (1+2+2+2)	58:46.5	+6:39.9
41	54	Iva Shkodreva	Bulgaria	54:48.2	4 (2+0+2+0)	58:48.2	+6:41.6
42	55	Krista Lepik	Estonia	53:54.9	5 (0+2+0+3)	58:54.9	+6:48.3
43	1	Gunn Margit Andreassen	Norway	56:02.7	3 (0+2+1+0)	59:02.7	+6:56.1
44	68	Andreja Grašić	Slovenia	50:09.3	9 (2+3+3+1)	59:09.3	+7:02.7
45	16	Agata Suszka	Poland	55:13.2	4 (2+0+2+0)	59:13.2	+7:06.6
46	28	Maria Schylander	Sweden	56:14.2	3 (1+0+0+2)	59:14.2	+7:07.6
47	20	Nadezhda Aleksieva	Bulgaria	56:15.0	3 (0+1+1+1)	59:15.0	+7:08.4
48	35	Mari Lampinen	Finland	53:16.9	6 (4+0+1+1)	59:16.9	+7:10.3
49	38	Natalia Ryzhenkova	Belarus	50:26.9	9 (2+3+1+3)	59:26.9	+7:20.3
50	6	Irena Novotná	Czech Republic	55:29.0	4 (0+2+1+1)	59:29.0	+7:22.4
51	17	Kristin Berg	Canada	53:36.5	6 (3+1+1+1)	59:36.5	+7:29.9
52	51	Helena Mikołajczyk	Poland	52:44.8	7 (3+1+0+3)	59:44.8	+7:38.2
53	19	Jelena Všivtseva	Estonia	53:50.1	6 (2+0+3+1)	59:50.1	+7:43.5
54	27	Yoshiko Honda	Japan	54:00.5	6 (0+4+0+2)	1:00:00.5	+7:53.9
55	60	Tuija Vuoksiala	Finland	54:09.3	6 (2+2+0+2)	1:00:09.3	+8:02.7
56	18	Katja Holanti	Finland	53:13.6	7 (4+3+0+0)	1:00:13.6	+8:07.0
57	26	Halina Pitoń	Poland	53:18.2	7 (2+2+2+1)	1:00:18.2	+8:11.6
58	65	Christina Eklund	Sweden	56:25.6	4 (2+0+1+1)	1:00:25.6	+8:19.0
59	11	Anne Elvebakk	Norway	55:29.8	5 (2+2+1+0)	1:00:29.8	+8:23.2
60	22	Catarina Eklund	Sweden	55:38.4	5 (3+0+0+2)	1:00:38.4	+8:31.8
61	25	Beatrix Holéczy	Hungary	56:43.9	4 (2+1+1+0)	1:00:43.9	+8:37.3
62	48	Kazimiera Strolienė	Lithuania	52:55.8	8 (2+3+1+2)	1:00:55.8	+8:49.2
63	21	Mihaela Cârstoi	Romania	54:15.0	7 (1+1+1+4)	1:01:15.0	+9:08.4
64	56	Sandra Paintin	Australia	54:21.7	7 (1+3+1+2)	1:01:21.7	+9:15.1
65	9	Brigitta Bereczki	Hungary	55:14.2	7 (2+2+0+3)	1:02:14.2	+10:07.6
66	32	Maria Giro	Argentina	57:24.2	5 (0+1+3+1)	1:02:24.2	+10:17.6
67	36	Yevgeniya Roppel	Kyrgyzstan	57:46.6	5 (1+1+0+3)	1:02:46.6	+10:40.0
68	59	Elena Gorohova	Moldova	59:33.1	14 (3+3+4+4)	1:13:33.1	+21:26.5
	24	Olena Petrova	Ukraine	DNF			
