= Speed skating at the 1994 Winter Olympics – Women's 500 metres =

Women's 500 metres at the XVII Olympic Winter Games
- Pictogram for speed skating
- Venue: Hamar Olympic Hall
- Dates: February 19, 1994
- Competitors: 34 from 12 nations
- Winning time: 39.25

Medalists
1st place, gold medalist(s)		Bonnie Blair; United States
2nd place, silver medalist(s)		Susan Auch; Canada
3rd place, bronze medalist(s)		Franziska Schenk; Germany

The women's 500 metres in speed skating at the 1994 Winter Olympics took place on 19 February, at the Hamar Olympic Hall.

== Records ==
Prior to this competition, the existing world and Olympic records were as follows:

World record	Bonnie Blair (USA)	39.10	Calgary, Canada	22 February 1988
Olympic record	Bonnie Blair (USA)	39.10	Calgary, Canada	22 February 1988

== Results ==
Rank	Pair	Lane	Athlete	Country	Time	Difference
1st place, gold medalist(s)	3	I	Bonnie Blair	United States	39.25	-
2nd place, silver medalist(s)	6	I	Susan Auch	Canada	39.61	+0.36
3rd place, bronze medalist(s)	2	I	Franziska Schenk	Germany	39.70	+0.45
4	1	O	Xue Ruihong	China	39.71	+0.46
5	5	I	Yoo Seon-Hee	South Korea	39.92	+0.67
6	3	O	Monique Garbrecht	Germany	39.95	+0.70
7	8	I	Svetlana Zhurova	Russia	40.17	+0.92
8	10	I	Edel Therese Høiseth	Norway	40.20	+0.95
9	14	I	Jin Hua	China	40.23	+0.98
10	5	O	Kyoko Shimazaki	Japan	40.26	+1.01
11	7	I	Yang Chunyuan	China	40.37	+1.12
12	1	I	Angela Stahnke	Germany	40.38	+1.13
13	6	O	Ye Qiaobo	China	40.42	+1.17
14	11	I	Tomomi Okazaki	Japan	40.55	+1.31
15	4	I	Anke Baier	Germany	40.59	+1.34
16	14	O	Michelle Morton	Canada	40.71	+1.46
17	9	O	Oksana Ravilova	Russia	40.72	+1.47
18	4	O	Shiho Kusunose	Japan	40.94	+1.69
19	12	I	Christine Aaftink	Netherlands	41.01	+1.76
20	15	O	Kristen Talbot	United States	41.05	+1.80
20	16	I	Svetlana Fedotkina	Russia	41.05	+1.80
22	17	O	Nataliya Polozkova	Russia	41.06	+1.81
23	9	I	Mihaela Dascălu	Romania	41.13	+1.88
23	11	O	Peggy Clasen	United States	41.13	+1.88
25	8	I	Mayumi Yamamoto	Japan	41.20	+1.95
26	17	I	Linda Johnson-Blair	Canada	41.42	+2.17
27	7	O	Emese Dörfler-Antal	Austria	41.59	+2.34
28	16	O	Gang Mi-yeong	South Korea	41.96	+2.71
29	10	O	Cerasela Hordobețiu	Romania	42.15	+2.90
30	15	I	Krisztina Egyed	Hungary	42.29	+3.04
31	13	I	Jeong Bae-yeong	South Korea	42.63	+3.38
32	12	O	Cheon Hui-ju	South Korea	43.05	+3.80
33	2	O	Catriona Le May Doan	Canada	59.75	+20.50
-	13	O	Michelle Kline	United States	DQ	
