= Speed skating at the 1994 Winter Olympics – Women's 1500 metres =

Women's 1500 metres at the XVII Olympic Winter Games
- Pictogram for speed skating
- Venue: Hamar Olympic Hall
- Dates: February 21, 1994
- Competitors: 30 from 11 nations
- Winning time: 2:02.19

Medalists
1st place, gold medalist(s)		Emese Hunyady; Austria
2nd place, silver medalist(s)		Svetlana Fedotkina; Russia
3rd place, bronze medalist(s)		Gunda Niemann-Kleemann; Germany

The women's 1500 metres in speed skating at the 1994 Winter Olympics took place on 21 February, at the Hamar Olympic Hall.

== Records ==
Prior to this competition, the existing world and Olympic records were as follows:

World record	Karin Enke (GDR)	1:59.30	Alma-Ata, Kazakh SSR, Soviet Union	22 March 1986
Olympic record	Yvonne van Gennip (NED)	2:00.68	Calgary, Canada	27 February 1988

== Results ==
Rank	Pair	Lane	Name	Country	Time	Behind
1st place, gold medalist(s)	3	O	Emese Hunyady	Austria	2:02.19	-
2nd place, silver medalist(s)	9	O	Svetlana Fedotkina	Russia	2:02.69	+0.50
3rd place, bronze medalist(s)	1	I	Gunda Niemann-Kleemann	Germany	2:03.41	+1.22
4	2	O	Bonnie Blair	United States	2:03.44	+1.25
5	9	I	Annamarie Thomas	Netherlands	2:03.70	+1.51
6	1	O	Svetlana Bazhanova	Russia	2:03.99	+1.80
7	5	I	Nataliya Polozkova	Russia	2:04.00	+1.81
8	5	O	Mihaela Dascălu	Romania	2:04.02	+1.83
9	4	I	Seiko Hashimoto	Japan	2:04.98	+2.79
10	12	I	Tonny De Jong	Netherlands	2:05.18	+2.99
11	7	I	Anke Baier	Germany	2:05.97	+3.78
12	2	I	Elena Belci	Italy	2:05.99	+3.80
13	3	I	Shiho Kusunose	Japan	2:06.20	+4.01
14	4	I	Ulrike Adeberg	Germany	2:06.40	+4.21
15	6	I	Hiromi Yamamoto	Japan	2:06.54	+4.35
16	14	O	Maki Tabata	Japan	2:06.79	+4.60
17	11	O	Catriona Le May Doan	Canada	2:07.19	+5.00
18	10	I	Ewa Wasilewska	Poland	2:07.44	+5.25
19	7	O	Emese Dörfler-Antal	Austria	2:07.72	+5.53
20	15	O	Michelle Kline	United States	2:08.02	+5.83
21	13	O	Angela Zuckerman	United States	2:08.43	+6.24
22	8	O	Carla Zijlstra	Netherlands	2:08.49	+6.30
23	11	I	Cerasela Hordobețiu	Romania	2:08.50	+6.31
24	13	I	Michelle Morton	Canada	2:08.53	+6.34
25	12	O	Oksana Ravilova	Russia	2:08.65	+6.46
26	15	I	Heike Warnicke	Germany	2:09.53	+7.34
27	6	O	Chantal Bailey	United States	2:09.68	+7.49
28	8	I	Ingrid Liepa	Canada	2:09.97	+7.78
29	10	O	Elisabetta Pizio	Italy	2:11.02	+8.83
30	14	I	Cheon Hui-ju	South Korea	2:12.14	+9.95
