= Speed skating at the 1994 Winter Olympics – Women's 5000 metres =

Women's 5000 metres at the XVII Olympic Winter Games
- Pictogram for speed skating
- Venue: Hamar Olympic Hall
- Dates: February 25, 1994
- Competitors: 16 from 9 nations
- Winning time: 7:14.37

Medalists
1st place, gold medalist(s)		Claudia Pechstein; Germany
2nd place, silver medalist(s)		Gunda Niemann-Kleemann; Germany
3rd place, bronze medalist(s)		Hiromi Yamamoto; Japan

The women's 5000 metres in speed skating at the 1994 Winter Olympics took place on 25 February, at the Hamar Olympic Hall.

== Records ==
Prior to this competition, the existing world and Olympic records were as follows:

World record	Gunda Niemann-Kleemann (GER)	7:13.29	Hamar, Norway	6 December 1993
Olympic record	Yvonne van Gennip (NED)	7:14.13	Calgary, Canada	28 February 1988

== Results ==
Rank	Pair	Lane	Name	Country	Time	Behind
1st place, gold medalist(s)	4	I	Claudia Pechstein	Germany	7:14.37	-
2nd place, silver medalist(s)	6	O	Gunda Niemann-Kleemann	Germany	7:14.88	+0.51
3rd place, bronze medalist(s)	5	O	Hiromi Yamamoto	Japan	7:19.68	+5.31
4	2	I	Elena Belci	Italy	7:20.33	+5.96
5	6	I	Svetlana Bazhanova	Russia	7:22.68	+8.31
6	8	I	Lyudmila Prokasheva	Kazakhstan	7:28.58	+14.21
7	7	O	Carla Zijlstra	Netherlands	7:29.42	+15.05
8	7	I	Seiko Hashimoto	Japan	7:29.79	+15.42
9	1	O	Miki Ogasawara	Japan	7:30.47	+16.10
10	1	I	Annamarie Thomas	Netherlands	7:32.39	+18.02
11	2	O	Tonny de Jong	Netherlands	7:36.07	+21.70
12	8	O	Emese Hunyady	Austria	7:38.62	+24.25
13	3	I	Tatyana Trapeznikova	Russia	7:40.55	+26.18
14	5	I	Cerasela Hordobețiu	Romania	7:41.65	+27.28
15	3	O	Emese Dörfler-Antal	Austria	7:46.78	+32.41
16	4	O	Ingrid Liepa	Canada	7:49.39	+35.02
