= China at the 1994 Winter Olympics =

- IOC code: CHN
- NOC: Chinese Olympic Committee
- Website: www.olympic.cn (in Chinese and English)

in Lillehammer
- Competitors: 24 (7 men and 17 women) in 5 sports
- Flag bearer: Liu Yanfei
- Medals: Gold 0 Silver 1 Bronze 2 Total 3

Winter Olympics appearances (overview)
- 1980; 1984; 1988; 1992; 1994; 1998; 2002; 2006; 2010; 2014; 2018; 2022; 2026

The People's Republic of China competed at the 1994 Winter Olympics in Lillehammer, Norway.

== Medalists ==
Medal	Name	Sport	Event	Date
Silver	Zhang Yanmei	Short track speed skating	Women's 500 metres	24 February
Bronze	Ye Qiaobo	Speed skating	Women's 1000 metres	23 February
Bronze	Chen Lu	Figure skating	Women's singles	25 February

== Competitors ==
The following is the list of number of competitors in the Games.

Sport	Men	Women	Total
Biathlon	0	4	4
Figure skating	1	3	4
Freestyle skiing	0	2	2
Short track speed skating	4	4	8
Speed skating	2	4	6
Total	7	17	24

== Biathlon ==
Women

Athlete	Event	Final		
Athlete	Event	Time	Misses	Rank
Song Aiqin	Individual	58:25.0	5	39
Song Aiqin	Sprint	27:33.5	1	23
Wang Jinfen	Individual	55:27.4	5	24
Wang Jinfen	Sprint	28:36.1	5	41
Liu Guilan; Song Aiqin; Wang Jinping; Wang Jinfen	Relay	2:01:08.8	5	14

== Figure skating ==
Athlete(s)	Event	CD1	CD2	SP/OD	FS/FD	Total	
Athlete(s)	Event	FP	FP	FP	FP	TFP	Rank
Zhang Min	Men's	—N/a		16 Q	21	21.0	20
Chen Lu	Ladies'	—N/a		4 Q	3	5.0	3rd place, bronze medalist(s)
Liu Ying	Ladies'	—N/a		23	22	33.5	23
Zhao Guona	Ladies'	—N/a		25	did not advance		

== Freestyle skiing ==
Women

Athlete	Event	Qualifying		Final	
Athlete	Event	Points	Rank	Points	Rank
Ji Xiaoou	Aerials	121.22	18	did not advance	
Yin Hong	Aerials	13.464	17	did not advance	

== Short track speed skating ==
Men

Athlete	Event	Heat		Quarterfinal		Semifinal		Final	
Athlete	Event	Time	Rank	Time	Rank	Time	Rank	Time	Rank
Li Jiajun	500m	44.67	1 Q	Disqualified					16
Li Jiajun	1000m	1:33.14	2 Q	Disqualified					16
Li Lianli	500m	1:03.44	4	did not advance					30
Li Lianli	1000m	1:34.52	2 Q	1:32.16	4	did not advance			14
Li Jiajun; Li Lianli; Yang He; Zhang Hongbo	5000m relay	—N/a				7:19.66	3 QB	Final B Disqualified	

Women

Athlete	Event	Heat		Quarterfinal		Semifinal		Final	
Athlete	Event	Time	Rank	Time	Rank	Time	Rank	Time	Rank
Wang Xiulan	500m	47.32	1 Q	48.40	1 Q	48.00	3 QB	B Final; 49.03	6
Wang Xiulan	1000m	1:43.71	2 Q	1:40.58	3	did not advance			14
Yang Yang (S)	500m	47.23	1 Q	47.25	1 Q	Disqualified			
Yang Yang (S)	1000m	1:46.53	2 Q	1:38.96	2 Q	2:12.06	3 ADV	1:47.10	5
Zhang Yanmei	500m	47.35	2 Q	46.64	2 Q	46.01 OR	1 Q	46.44	2nd place, silver medalist(s)
Zhang Yanmei	1000m	1:39.72	2 Q	1:39.02	2 Q	1:37.26	2 Q	1:37.80	4
Su Xiaohua; Wang Xiulan; Yang Yang (S); Zhang Yanmei	3000m relay	—N/a				4:32.14	1 Q	Disqualified	

== Speed skating ==
Men

Athlete	Event	Final	
Athlete	Event	Time	Rank
Liu Hongbo	500 m	36.54	4
Liu Hongbo	1000 m	1:13.47	4
Liu Yanfei	1500 m	did not finish	

Women

Athlete	Event	Final	
Athlete	Event	Time	Rank
Jin Hua	500 m	40.23	9
Jin Hua	1000 m	1:21.48	16
Xue Ruihong	500 m	39.71	4
Xue Ruihong	1000 m	1:20.93	12
Yang Chunyuan	500 m	40.37	11
Yang Chunyuan	1000 m	1:23.27	30
Ye Qiaobo	500 m	40.42	13
Ye Qiaobo	1000 m	1:20.22	3rd place, bronze medalist(s)
