= Figure skating at the 1994 Winter Olympics – Men's singles =

Men's singles at the XVII Olympic Winter Games
- Venue: Hamar Olympic Amphitheatre
- Dates: 17–19 February 1994
- Competitors: 25 from 17 nations

Medalists
| 1st place, gold medalist(s) | | Alexei Urmanov | Russia |
| 2nd place, silver medalist(s) | | Elvis Stojko | Canada |
| 3rd place, bronze medalist(s) | | Philippe Candeloro | France |

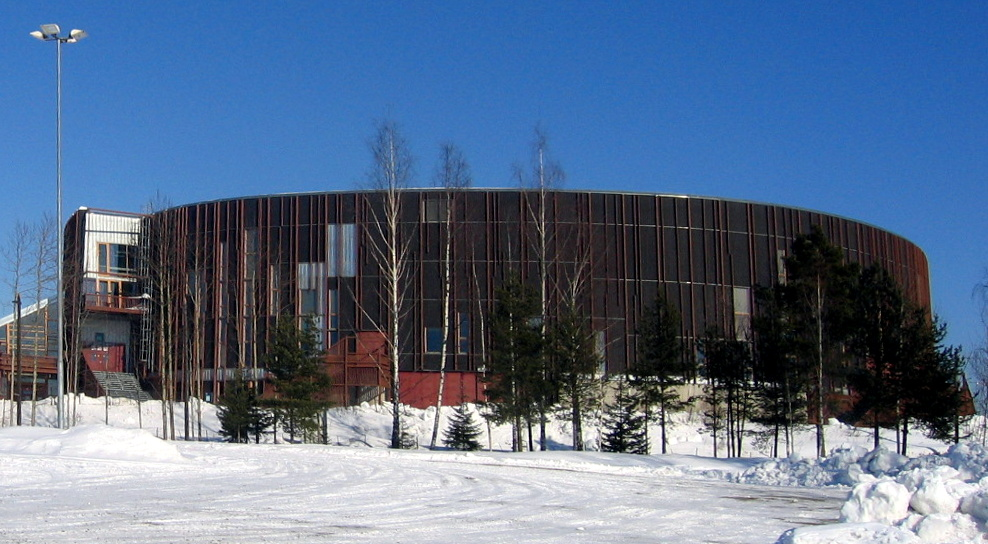
The figure skating events at the 1994 Winter Olympics were held at the Hamar Olympic Amphitheatre in Hamar, Norway.

Men's single skating at the 1994 Winter Olympics was contested between 17 and 19 February 1994. 25 skaters from 17 nations participated.

== Results ==
| Rank | Name | Nation | SP | FS | TFP |
|---|---|---|---|---|---|
| 1st place, gold medalist(s) | Alexei Urmanov | Russia | 1 | 1 | 1.5 |
| 2nd place, silver medalist(s) | Elvis Stojko | Canada | 2 | 2 | 3.0 |
| 3rd place, bronze medalist(s) | Philippe Candeloro | France | 3 | 5 | 6.5 |
| 4 | Viktor Petrenko | Ukraine | 9 | 4 | 8.5 |
| 5 | Kurt Browning | Canada | 12 | 3 | 9.0 |
| 6 | Brian Boitano | United States | 8 | 6 | 10.0 |
| 7 | Éric Millot | France | 6 | 7 | 10.0 |
| 8 | Scott Davis | United States | 4 | 8 | 10.0 |
| 9 | Steven Cousins | Great Britain | 7 | 9 | 12.5 |
| 10 | Sébastien Britten | Canada | 10 | 10 | 15.0 |
| 11 | Oleg Tataurov | Russia | 5 | 13 | 15.5 |
| 12 | Masakazu Kagiyama | Japan | 11 | 11 | 16.5 |
| 13 | Michael Tyllesen | Denmark | 13 | 12 | 18.5 |
| 14 | Cornel Gheorghe | Romania | 16 | 14 | 22.0 |
| 15 | Igor Pashkevich | Russia | 14 | 15 | 22.0 |
| 16 | Michael Shmerkin | Israel | 15 | 17 | 24.5 |
| 17 | Jung Sung-Il | South Korea | 18 | 16 | 25.0 |
| 18 | Stephen Carr | Australia | 20 | 18 | 28.0 |
| 19 | Marius Negrea | Romania | 19 | 19 | 28.5 |
| 20 | Zhang Min | China | 16 | 21 | 29.0 |
| 21 | Andrejs Vlascenko | Latvia | 21 | 20 | 30.5 |
| 22 | Fumihiro Oikawa | Japan | 21 | 22 | 32.5 |
| 23 | Alexander Murashko | Belarus | 24 | 23 | 35.0 |
| 24 | Dino Quattrocecere | South Africa | 23 | 24 | 35.5 |
Free skate not reached
| 25 | Margus Hernits | Estonia | 25 | | |

Note: In the short program, Gheorghe and Min tied for 16th, while Vlascenko and Oikawa tied for 21st
