= 1994 Winter Olympics closing ceremony =

- Part of 1994 Winter Olympics
- Date: 27 February 1994
- Time: 20:00-23:00 CET (UTC+9)
- Venue: Lysgårdsbakken
- Location: Lillehammer, Norway; 61.1256°N 10.4879°E
- Filmed by: 1994 Olympic Radio and Television Organisation (NRK ORTO '94)

The closing ceremony of the 1994 Winter Olympics was held in Lysgårdsbakken in Lillehammer, Norway on 27 February 1994. All spectators were handed a flashlight with the inscription "Remember Sarajevo" – the host of the 1984 Winter Olympics which was at the heart of the Bosnian War. The first entrants on the stage were Liv Ullmann and Thor Heyerdal, followed by the athletes' precession. After the flag had been transferred to Nagano mayor Tasuku Tsukada, speeches were held by Lillehammer mayor Audun Tron, LOOC head Gerhard Heiberg and IOC president Juan Antonio Samaranch. The latter used his speech to commemorate Sarajevo's situation, before giving Heiberg the Olympic Order in gold, and declaring the games "the best Olympic Winter Games ever". Artistic presentations followed, revisiting many of the themes from the opening ceremony. The mascots of the 1998 Winter Olympics, the "Snowlets", were also presented. Of the 2,200 people performing in the opening and closing ceremonies, only 50 were professionals.

== Anthems ==
The Anthems of Greece, Norway, and Japan were heard at the ceremony.

- National Anthem of Greece – Hellenic Army Band
- National Anthem of Norway – Norwegian Army Band
- National Anthem of Japan – Nagano Prefectural Police Band
- Olympic Hymn – Sissel Kyrkjebø
