= Anke Baier-Loef =

German speed skater

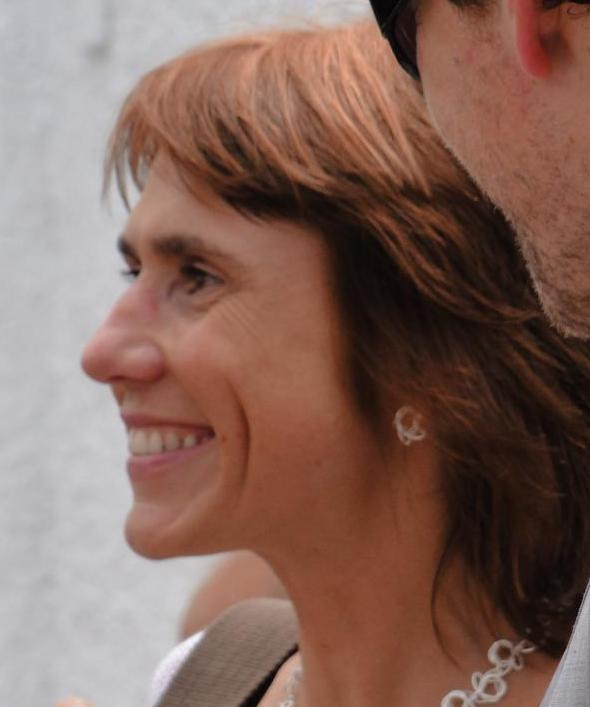

Personal information
- Born: 22 May 1972 (age 54) Eisenach, East Germany
- Height: 1.64 m (5 ft 4 1/2 in)

Sport
- Country: Germany
- Sport: Speed skating
Medal record
Representing Germany
World Championships
Silver medal – second place	1994 Lillehammer	1000 m

Anke Baier-Loef (née Baier; born 22 May 1972) is a German speed skater who competed in the 1992, 1994 and 1998 Winter Olympics.

She was born in Eisenach and is married to Arie Loef.

In 1992, she finished ninth in the 1000 metres event and tenth in the 500 metres competition.

Two years later she won the silver medal in the 1000 metres contest. In the 1500 metres event, she finished eleventh and in the 500 metres competition she finished 15th.

At the 1998 Games, she finished 15th in the 500 metres contest and 16th in the 1000 metres event.
