= Svetlana Fedotkina =

Russian speed skater

Personal information
- Born: 22 July 1967 (age 59) Krasnoyarsk, Soviet Union
- Height: 1.80 m (5 ft 11 in)
- Weight: 75 kg (165 lb)

Sport
- Country: Russia
- Sport: Speed skating
Medal record
Women's speed skating
Representing Russia
Olympic Games
Silver medal – second place	1994 Lillehammer	1500 m

Svetlana Aleksandrovna Fedotkina (Russian: Светлана Александровна Федоткина, born 22 July 1967) is a Russian speed skater who competed in the 1994 Winter Olympics.

She was born in Krasnoyarsk.

In 1994 she won the silver medal in the 1500 metres contest. In the 1000 metres event she finished eleventh and in the 500 metres competition she finished 20th.
