= Lyubov Belyakova =

Russian biathlete

Personal information
- Nationality: Russian
- Born: 10 December 1967 (age 57)

Sport
- Sport: Biathlon

Lyubov Belyakova (born 10 December 1967) is a Russian biathlete. She competed in women's sprint event at the 1994 Winter Olympics.
