= Susan Humphreys =

Canadian figure skater

Susan Anne Humphreys
Personal information
- Full name: Susan Anne Humphreys
- Born: October 30, 1975 (age 50) Moose Jaw, Saskatchewan
- Height: 1.65 m (5 ft 5 in)

Figure skating career
- Country: Canada
- Discipline: Women's singles
- Skating club: Royal Glenora Club
- Retired: 1999

Susan Anne Humphreys-St. Martin, née Humphreys, (born October 30, 1975, in Moose Jaw, Saskatchewan) is a Canadian former competitive figure skater. She is the 1997 Canadian national champion and competed at the 1994 Winter Olympics. She currently works as a skating instructor for hockey players.

== Career ==
=== Early career ===
Humphreys began skating at age 3 and was initially coached by her aunt. Early in her career, she was coached by Linda Brauckmann, the coach of World champion Karen Magnussen.

Humphreys was the Canadian champion in the women's novice division in 1990. The next year, she competed as a junior and placed 13th. Afterward, Brauckmann stopped working with her. Humphreys moved from Vancouver to Edmonton and began working with Christy Ness, who also coached Kristi Yamaguchi. Humphreys said that she changed her training approach after watching Yamaguchi.

She missed the 1991–1992 season due to having surgery on her shoulder, which she needed after dislocating her shoulder nine times within a year due to a genetic issue. Competing the next season as a senior, she qualified for the Canadian Championships and won the bronze medal.

=== 1993–1994 season ===
In the 1993–1994 season, Humphreys was selected for Skate Canada International, her first major international event. She first competed at two smaller events, the Grand Prix International St. Gervais and the Nebelhorn Trophy, and she won the silver medal at both. Humphreys increased the difficulty of her programs by adding more triple jumps, saying that she planned to do "everything but the triple Axel" that season, though at age 18, it was considered late for her to be debuting new triple jumps. At Skate Canada, she finished 5th. Humphreys noted that for the first time, she was experiencing nerves at competitions.

At the 1994 Canadian Championships in January, Humphreys landed six triple jumps, including a triple flip jump, though she removed a planned triple Lutz jump in favor of a double in order to skate a clean program. She popped a double Axel into a single but otherwise had no major mistakes, and she finished the competition in second place over Karen Preston. Her placement earned her a berth on the 1994 Winter Olympics team.

In February, at the Olympics, Humphreys drew first to skate in the short program. She landed a triple flip in combination, but then fell on her double Lutz later in the program, and she finished in 26th place overall, which meant she did not advance to the free skate. Humphreys said she had not felt especially nervous, but that, "For some reason, I was thinking about (the double Lutz) 20 or 30 seconds before I did it. I just tightened up." She said that while she was disappointed, she was trying not to let it affect her self-esteem. "I'll just have to try and take this as experience and to try and learn more about myself." Humphreys later said that other athletes helped comfort her and change her perspective on her performance by reminding her that few athletes ever qualified for the Olympics. In March, at the 1994 World Championships, she skated her short program cleanly to place 10th in that segment, and she rose to 9th place after the free skate. Humphreys said she was happy with her placement and to have shown a stronger performance than she had at the Olympics.

=== 1994–1998 Olympic cycle ===
Humphreys was assigned to the 1994 Skate Canada; however, she withdrew due to a back injury reported as either strained ligaments or injuries to several of her vertebrae. She missed six months of training while recovering. The injury was caused by overtraining, and it led to a disagreement between her family and her coach, Christy Ness, whose husband had been in charge of Humphreys's off-ice training regimen. Afterward, Ness parted was with Humphreys. Humphreys said that she did not blame the training plan for her injury and that "I have to be smart enough to say when I'm hurting." She stated that pressure from her family due to the disagreement had not led to the split, and she changed coaches to Cynthia Ullmark. At the Canadian Championships, she attempted just two triple jumps in her free skate, only one of which she landed successfully. She finished the competition in third place and missed earning a spot on the World Championships team.

In the 1995–1996 season, Humphreys debuted at Skate Canada in November. Despite a fall on a triple loop jump in her free skate, she finished in 5th place and said she was "ahead of schedule" in her comeback and that she was happy to accomplish her goal of finishing in the top half of the field. Later in November, she took sixth place in the Nations Cup held in Gelsenkirchen, Germany. At the Canadian Championships, she finished fourth in the short program after a shaky performance where she fell on her combination jump and had poor landings on her other two jumping passes. However, she moved up to win the bronze medal after she landed four triple jumps in her free skate. She said of her performance, "I went out there smiling and I came back smiling, and I have no regrets."

The next season, still experiencing back pain, she competed on the 1996 Grand Prix series at three events. At Skate Canada, she placed last in the short program, but she recovered to finish in 6th after performing the fourth-best free skate. Next, at the Nations Cup, she was 9th. At the NHK Trophy in December, she placed third in the short program, but in the free skate, she dropped to fifth after landing only one of her five planned triple jumps.

Ahead of the Canadian Championships, Humphreys expressed confidence, and she noted that it was the first year since 1994 when she had been able to train fully. In the short program, she almost fell on her last jump, a triple toe loop, but she stayed on her feet and ended that competition segment in first place. She finished first in the free skate as well to become the Canadian champion, and she was also given Canada's only berth at the 1997 World Championships, where most quotas for the Olympics would be won.

At the World Championships, she fell twice in the qualifying round but advanced to the short program. The day before the short program, an abscess formed on her left ankle. Humphreys competed despite the still-healing abscess and finished in 21st place in the short program. Her coach, Ullmark, blamed her performance not on her injury but on nerves, saying that her injury was "just a sore ankle". Humphreys said she tried to ignore the pain while she skated, but a reporter noted that she visibly flinched while jumping. Her ankle worsened after the short program, and she spent the night in the hospital after having surgery; Ullmark expressed regret about her previous comments and commended Humphreys for competing on the injury. Humphreys withdrew from the free skate, leaving the quota she hoped to qualify for Canada at the 1998 Winter Olympics in doubt.

Humphreys expressed hope that the quota would be granted, as she could not have placed too low to miss it after reaching the free skate; several delegations suggested to Skate Canada that she should have simply arrived on the ice and stood still while her music played, though Humphreys later said that "as it turned out, that wouldn't have got me in." She said of the situation, "You can't beat yourself up over something you had no way to see coming. I can't feel responsible for this." In 2002, Humphreys alleged that Skate Canada officials had wanted her to compete in the free skate, but that the doctors at the hospital insisted that she needed surgery to save her life.

Canada was not given the quota, and Humphreys competed at the 1997 Karl Schäfer Memorial, the last Olympic selection event, to attempt to qualify one of the last six open quotas for the Olympics. Ahead the competition, she selected Sarah Kawahara, who had choreographed for Scott Hamilton and Oksana Baiul, to create her programs. While Humphreys was expected to qualify, she finished 15th in the short program and fell to 18th place in the free skate after landing only one triple jump; she would have needed to place 13th to secure the quota (some competitors were from nations who had already qualified to the Olympics and could not win another spot). Ted Barton, then director of the B.C. Figure Skating Association, said Canadians shouldn't "swim in sorrow" and that while Humphreys was a talented skater, she had shown she was not "the best competitor" at the moment. Another official said that he thought she would booed if she competed at Skate Canada.

Humpreys did not resume training after the Karl Schäfer Memorial. She withdrew from Skate Canada International, citing physical medical reasons and that her doctor had said she should not subject herself to stress for several weeks. A few days later, she revealed that she was experiencing hormonal issues from overtraining that led to "extreme fatigue", and that she had previously experienced the same issues. Humphreys said she did not feel Skate Canada was supportive, while Skate Canada's director, David Dore, said Humphreys was "abandoning" them by withdrawing from Skate Canada International with no clear expectation of when she would return. She went on to withdraw from another event, the Cup of Russia, and the Canadian Championships due to her ongoing hormonal issues. Humphreys later described her problems as a "physical depression" that caused her intense anxiety and issues with her sleep on top of fatigue.

=== Retirement ===
Humpreys returned to training in 1998, then moved to Barrie, Ontario to work with Doug and Michelle Leigh, who also coached World champion Elvis Stojko. She had to take two months off late in the year after she and another skate collided during practice, where she was seriously cut by the other skater's blade. Her new programs were choreographed by Lori Nichol. However, she did not end up returning to competition and announced her retirement in July, 1999.

In 2002, Humphreys said she had experienced anorexia nervosa, bulimia nervosa, and anxiety disorder during her career, which started when one of her coaches, during the time she trained with the Nesses, told her to lose 20 pounds (9.1 kg) when she only weighed 130 pounds (59 kg). Humphreys developed eating disorders as she attempted to lose weight and began to have panic attacks. She described herself as having recovered by 2002 and began giving talks about her experiences.

== Personal life ==
Humphreys's father was a hockey player who received a degree in physical education. She has two sisters who studied kinesiology and physiotheraphy.

She attended the University of Alberta, studying psychology and sociology. After retiring, she returned to the university to study physical education. She married fellow student and hockey player Blair St. Martin in 2000 after they met at a Christian athletes' association. The couple moved to Edmonton and had three children. Humphreys coached figure skating, and she now works as a skating instructor for hockey players.

== Competitive highlights ==
- GP – Event of the ISU Grand Prix Series
- WD – Withdrew from competition

Competition placements between the 1992–1993 and 1997–1998 season
Season	1992–1993	1993–1994	1994–1995	1995–1996	1996–1997	1997–1998
Winter Olympics		26th				
World Championships		9th			WD	
GP Nations Cup				6th	9th	
GP NHK Trophy					5th	
GP Skate Canada		5th		5th	6th	
Karl Schäfer Memorial						18th
Nebelhorn Trophy		2nd				
St. Gervais		2nd				
Canadian Championships	3rd	2nd	3rd	3rd	1st	
