= Yelena Grigoryeva (figure skater) =

Belarusian figure skater

Personal information
- Nationality: Belarusian
- Born: 26 November 1974 (age 50); Minsk, Belarus

Sport
- Sport: Figure skating

Yelena Grigoryeva (born 26 November 1974) is a Belarusian figure skater. She competed in the pairs event at the 1994 Winter Olympics.
