= Ken Lovsin =

Canadian ice hockey player

- Born: December 4, 1966 (age 59) Peace River, Alberta, Canada
- Height: 6 ft 0 in (183 cm)
- Weight: 195 lb (88 kg; 13 st 13 lb)
- Position: Defence
- Shot: Right
- Played for: Washington Capitals
- NHL draft: 1987 NHL Supplemental Draft; Hartford Whalers
- Playing career: 1990–1993
Medal record
Men's ice hockey
Silver medal – second place	1994 Lillehammer	Ice Hockey

Kenneth Lovsin (born December 3, 1966) is a Canadian former professional ice hockey defenceman who played in one National Hockey League game for the Washington Capitals during the 1990–91 NHL season against the Pittsburgh Penguins. He failed to register a point despite registering 2 shots and was -2 in the game.

He was also a member of Canada's silver medal winning team at the 1994 Lillehammer Winter Olympic Games.

== Career statistics ==
=== Regular season and playoffs ===
			Regular season					Playoffs
Season	Team	League	GP	G	A	Pts	PIM	GP	G	A	Pts	PIM
1985–86	Camrose Lutheran College	ACAC	25	2	19	21	18	—	—	—	—	—
1986–87	University of Saskatchewan	CIAU	28	3	13	16	14	9	3	1	4	6
1987–88	University of Saskatchewan	CIAU	26	10	28	38	27	3	1	3	4	2
1988–89	Canada	Intl	59	0	10	10	59	—	—	—	—	—
1989–90	Canada	Intl	66	7	15	22	80	—	—	—	—	—
1990–91	Washington Capitals	NHL	1	0	0	0	0	—	—	—	—	—
1990–91	Baltimore Skipjacks	AHL	79	8	28	36	54	6	1	1	2	2
1991–92	Baltimore Skipjacks	AHL	77	11	24	35	60	—	—	—	—	—
1992–93	Mora IK	SWE II	36	7	13	20	50	5	0	2	2	12
1992–93	Canada	Intl	9	0	3	3	0	—	—	—	—	—
1993–94	Canada	Intl	62	3	11	14	22	—	—	—	—	—
Intl totals			196	10	39	49	161	—	—	—	—	—
AHL totals			156	19	52	71	114	6	1	1	2	2

=== International ===
Year	Team	Event	GP	G	A	Pts	PIM
1994	Canada	OG	8	0	0	0	8

== See also ==
- List of players who played only one game in the NHL
