= Sergey Sheyko (figure skater) =

Belarusian figure skater

Personal information
- Nationality: Belarusian
- Born: 9 January 1973 (age 52) Minsk, Belarus

Sport
- Sport: Figure skating

Sergey Sheyko (born 9 January 1973) is a Belarusian figure skater. He competed in the pairs event at the 1994 Winter Olympics.
