= Elisabetta Pizio =

Italian speed skater

Personal information
- Nationality: Italian
- Born: 19 March 1971 (age 54); Schilpario, Italy

Sport
- Sport: Speed skating

Elisabetta Pizio (born 19 March 1971) is an Italian speed skater. She competed in two events at the 1994 Winter Olympics.
