= Miki Ogasawara =

Japanese speed skater (born 1974)

Personal information
- Nationality: Japanese
- Born: 17 February 1974 (age 51); Kiyosato, Hokkaido, Japan

Sport
- Sport: Speed skating

Miki Ogasawara (小笠原 幹, Ogasawara Miki, born 17 February 1974) is a Japanese speed skater. She competed in two events at the 1994 Winter Olympics.
