= Oleg Tataurov =

Russian figure skater

Personal information
- Full name: Oleg Stanislavovich Tataurov
- Born: 23 August 1972 (age 53) Leningrad, Russian SFSR, Soviet Union
- Height: 1.72 m (5 ft 7 1/2 in)

Figure skating career
- Country: Russia
- Skating club: Yubileyney
- Began skating: 1978
- Retired: 1998

Oleg Stanislavovich Tataurov (Russian: Олег Станиславович Татауров; born 23 August 1972) is a Russian figure skating coach and former competitor who represented the Soviet Union and Russia. He won silver and bronze medals at the Grand Prix International St. Gervais and represented Russia at the 1994 Winter Olympics, where he placed 11th.

== Personal life ==
Tataurov was born on 23 August 1972 in Leningrad, Russian SFSR, Soviet Union.

== Career ==
Tataurov began skating in 1978. He was coached by Alexei Mishin in Saint Petersburg.

Tataurov took bronze at the 1990 Grand Prix International St. Gervais and silver a year later. He won the bronze medal at the 1991 Winter Universiade for the Soviet Union. After its dissolution, he represented Russia. He won several Russian national medals and was selected to compete at the 1994 Winter Olympics in Lillehammer, Norway. He finished 11th after placing 5th in the short program and 13th in the free skate.

Tataurov coaches at Yubileyny Sport Club in Saint Petersburg. He has coached the following skaters:

- Petr Gumennik
- Alexander Petrov
- Andrei Lazukin
- Alexei Krasnozhon (until 2014)
- Vladislav Dikidzhi

== Competitive highlights ==
GP: ISU Champions Series (Grand Prix)

International
Event	90–91 (URS)	91–92 (URS)	92–93 (RUS)	93–94 (RUS)	94–95 (RUS)	95–96 (RUS)	96–97 (RUS)	97–98 (RUS)
Olympics				11th				
Worlds			11th	12th				
Europeans			7th	7th	6th			
GP Nations Cup						9th		
Goodwill Games					5th			
Nations Cup				5th				
NHK Trophy					11th			
Skate America					4th			
Skate Canada			4th	5th				
Finlandia Trophy								2nd
Moscow News	3rd							
St. Gervais	3rd	2nd						
Universiade	3rd						7th	
National
Russian Champ.			2nd	2nd	3rd	5th	6th	5th
Soviet Champ.		5th						
