= Liu Ying (figure skater) =

Chinese figure skater

Personal information
- Nationality: Chinese
- Born: 刘•颖; 3 September 1975 (age 51)

Sport
- Sport: Figure skating

Liu Ying (born 3 September 1975) is a Chinese figure skater. She competed in the ladies' singles event at the 1994 Winter Olympics.
