= Alexander Murashko =

Belarusian figure skater

Personal information
- Native name: Аляксандар Мурашка
- Born: October 31, 1971 (age 54) Minsk, Belarusian SSR, Soviet Union (present-day Belarus)
- Height: 1.74 m (5 ft 8 1/2 in)

Figure skating career
- Country: Belarus
- Retired: 1997

Alexander Murashko (Note: Belarusian: Аляксандар Мурашка, romanized: Alyaksandar Murashka) (born October 31, 1971) is a Belarusian former competitive figure skater. He represented Belarus at the 1994 Winter Olympics and placed 23rd in men's singles. His best result at a senior ISU Championship was 17th at the 1995 European Championships in Dortmund. After retiring from competition, Murashko became a coach in California.

== Competitive highlights ==
International
Event	1991-92	1992–93	1993–94	1994–95	1995–96	1996–97
Winter Olympics			23rd			
World Champ.		24th	27th	20th	24th	33rd
European Champ.		22nd		17th	21st	28th
Finlandia						10th
Piruetten		5th				
Skate Israel					8th	5th
National
Belarusian Champ.	1st	1st	1st	1st	1st	1st
