= Gillian Hamilton =

Canadian biathlete

Gillian Hamilton (born 29 August 1969) is a Canadian former biathlete who competed in the 1994 Winter Olympics. Her son, Kieran Baskett, is a professional soccer player.
