= Fumihiro Oikawa =

Japanese figure skater

Japanese name
- Kanji: 及川史弘
- Kana: おいかわ ふみひろ
Transcriptions
- Romanization: Oikawa Fumihiro

Fumihiro Oikawa
Personal information
- Born: August 26, 1973 (age 53) Sendai, Miyagi Prefecture, Japan
- Height: 1.74 m (5 ft 8 1/2 in)

Figure skating career
- Country: Japan
- Retired: 1994

Fumihiro Oikawa (及川 史弘, Oikawa Fumihiro; born August 26, 1973) is a Japanese former competitive figure skater. He is the 1994 Japanese national champion and placed 22nd at the 1994 Winter Olympics. After retiring from competition, he became a journalist.

== Results ==
International
Event	1991–92	1992–93	1993–94
Winter Olympics			22nd
World Championships			24th
Skate America	9th		
Internationale de Paris			13th
National
Japan Championships		3rd	1st
