= Zhao Guona =

Chinese figure skater

Personal information
- Nationality: Chinese
- Born: 30 May 1978 (age 46)

Sport
- Sport: Figure skating

Zhao Guona (born 30 May 1978) is a Chinese figure skater. She competed in the ladies' singles event at the 1994 Winter Olympics.
