= Gerhard Heiberg =

Norwegian industrialist (born 1939)

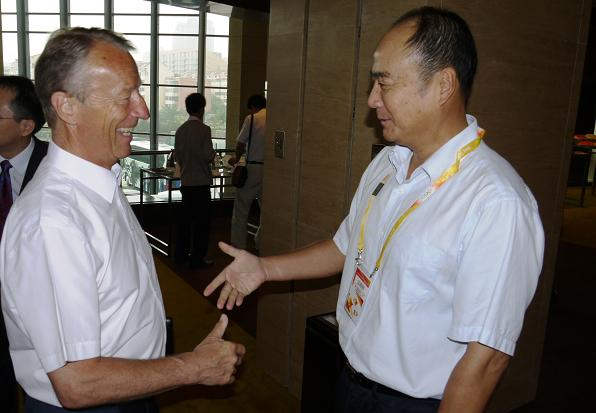
Heiberg (left) in 2009.

Jens Gerhard Heiberg (born 20 April 1939, in Oslo) is a Norwegian industrialist who was head of the Lillehammer Olympic Organizing Committee (LOOC) and member of the International Olympic Committee.

== Education ==
Heiberg received a graduate degree in economics at the School of Economics in Copenhagen in 1963 and one in Human Relations in Business & Industry at the California State University in 1964.

== Career ==
Heiberg began his career in 1965–1966 as a market analyst at Norsk Hydro. He then became vice president in 1973 and President in 1987. After his work at Norsk Hydro, he held various management positions at Borregaard from 1966 to 1972. In 1972, he was also deputy CEO of Norcem until 1973. He was then CEO of Norcem from 1973 to 1987 and of the merged Aker Norcem from 1987 to 1989. Heiberg became a member of the International Olympic Committee in 1994 and was board member of it from 2003 to 2017. He has been an honorary member since 2017. In 1994, he was the President of the Lillehammer 1994 Paralympics Games Organising Committee (LPOC). He was also a member of the Olympic Winter Games Coordination Committee in Nagano from 1995 to 1998, in Salt Lake City from 1996 to 2002 and in Turin from 2000 to 2006. Heiberg also had several positions in the business. He was chairman of Aker ASA from 1989 to 1996 and of Norwegian Trade Council. Heiberg was also chairman of the Committee of Representatives of Wilh. Wilhelmsen. From 1995 to 2000 he was chairman of the board of Den norske Bank. He is also a partner in the firm Norscan Partners AS in Oslo.

== Awards ==
Heiberg has received several commissions and awards for his work. He has been Commander of St. Olav's Order and of the Togolese Mono Order, Knight of the Lion's Order and of the French Honors Legion as well as holder of a Great Global Mark in Silver of the Austrian Global Mark for Merit. Heiberg has also received the Olympic order of gold.

Preceded by (France) Jean-Claude Killy	President of Organizing Committee for Winter Olympic Games; 1994	Succeeded by (Japan) Eishiro Saito
