= María Giro =

Argentine biathlete (born 1971)

Personal information
- Full name: María Edelia Giro
- Nationality: Argentine
- Born: 12 May 1971 (age 53)

Sport
- Sport: Biathlon

María Edelia Giro (born 12 May 1971) is an Argentine biathlete. She competed at the 1992 Winter Olympics and the 1994 Winter Olympics.
