= Irina Kokoueva =

Belarusian biathlete (born 1973)

Personal information
- Nationality: Belarusian
- Born: 24 June 1973 (age 51)

Sport
- Sport: Biathlon

Irina Kokoueva (born 24 June 1973) is a Belarusian biathlete. She competed in three events at the 1994 Winter Olympics.
