= Kristin Berg =

Canadian biathlete

Kristin Berg (born 19 December 1968) is a Canadian former biathlete who competed in the 1994 Winter Olympics and in the 1998 Winter Olympics.
