= Kang Mi-young =

South Korean speed skater

Personal information
- Nationality: South Korean
- Born: 3 October 1978 (age 46); Gyeongsangbuk, South Korea

Sport
- Sport: Speed skating

Kang Mi-young (born 3 October 1978) is a South Korean speed skater. She competed at the 1994 Winter Olympics and the 1998 Winter Olympics.
