= Mayumi Yamamoto (speed skater) =

Japanese speed skater (born 1971)

Personal information
- Nationality: Japanese
- Born: 26 April 1971 (age 53); Tomakomai, Hokkaido, Japan

Sport
- Sport: Speed skating

Mayumi Yamamoto (山本 真弓, Yamamoto Mayumi, born 26 April 1971) is a Japanese speed skater. She competed in two events at the 1994 Winter Olympics.
