= Sandra Paintin-Paul =

Australian biathlete

Sandra Paintin-Paul is an Australian biathlete who competed at two Winter Olympics, in 1992 and 1994. She was the first female Australian biathlete, along with Kerryn Rim, to compete at the Olympics. Sandra is married to fellow Australian Olympian biathlete, Andrew Paul. On her debut, she came 54th and 40th out of 68 and 66 competitors respectively in the 7.5 km and 15 km events. Two years later in 1994, she came 40th and 64th out of 69 and 68 racers in the same events.
