= Sébastien Britten =

Canadian figure skater

Personal information
- Born: May 17, 1970 (age 56) Verdun, Quebec, Canada
- Height: 1.72 m (5 ft 8 in)

Figure skating career
- Country: Canada
- Skating club: CPA Brossard
- Retired: 1997

Sébastien Britten (born May 17, 1970) is a Canadian former competitive figure skater. He won bronze medals at three senior internationals — the 1992 International de Paris, the 1993 Nations Cup and the 1994 Skate Canada International — and became the Canadian national champion in 1995. Britten represented Canada at the 1994 Winter Olympics, where he placed 10th. He competed at three World Championships, achieving his best result, eighth, in 1994.

In 1998, Britten beat several Olympic and World medallists to win the 1998 World Professional Figure Skating Championships held in Jaca, Spain. Following his retirement from competitive skating, he began working as a coach and choreographer.

== Programs ==
Season	Short program	Free skating
1995–96		Light Cavalary Overture; Poet and Peasant Overture by Franz von Suppé

== Competitive highlights ==
GP: Champions Series (Grand Prix)

=== 1990–1997 ===
International
Event	90–91	91–92	92–93	93–94	94–95	95–96	96–97
Winter Olympics				10th			
World Champ.				8th	17th	17th	
GP Skate Canada						8th	
GP Nations Cup						7th	
Int. de Paris / Trophée de France			3rd		9th		
Nations Cup			7th	3rd			
Nebelhorn Trophy	6th	6th					
Piruetten							WD
Skate America				8th			
Skate Canada					3rd		
National
Canadian Champ.	9th	3rd	4th	3rd	1st	2nd	3rd
WD: Withdrew

=== Junior career ===
National
Event	88–89	89–90
Canadian Championships	3rd J.	1st J.
