= Song Aiqin =

Chinese biathlete (born 1970)

Personal information
- Nationality: Chinese
- Born: 27 December 1970 (age 54)

Sport
- Sport: Biathlon

Song Aiqin (Chinese: 宋爱芹, born 27 December 1970) is a Chinese biathlete. She competed at the 1992 Winter Olympics and the 1994 Winter Olympics.
