= Figure skating at the 1994 Winter Olympics – Pairs =

Pair skating at the XVII Olympic Winter Games
- Venue: Hamar Olympic Amphitheatre
- Dates: 13–15 February 1994
- Competitors: 36 (18 pairs) from 10 nations

Medalists
1st place, gold medalist(s)		Ekaterina Gordeeva; Sergei Grinkov	Russia
2nd place, silver medalist(s)		Natalia Mishkutenok; Artur Dmitriev	Russia
3rd place, bronze medalist(s)		Isabelle Brasseur; Lloyd Eisler	Canada

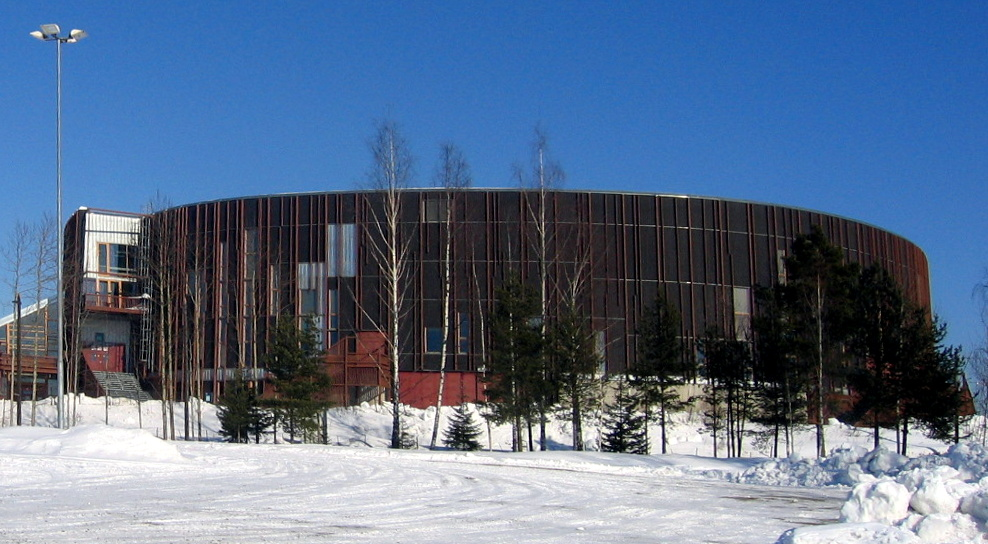
The figure skating events at the 1994 Winter Olympics were held at the Hamar Olympic Amphitheatre in Hamar, Norway.

Pair skating was contested between 13 and 15 February 1994. 18 pairs from 10 nations participated.

Mandy Wötzel and Ingo Steuer withdrew from competition after Wötzel fell on the ice and was too injured to continue.

== Results ==
Pairs results
Rank	Team	Nation	Points	SP	FS
1st place, gold medalist(s)	Ekaterina Gordeeva; Sergei Grinkov	Russia	1	1	1.5
2nd place, silver medalist(s)	Natalia Mishkutionok / Artur Dmitriev	Russia	2	2	3.0
3rd place, bronze medalist(s)	Isabelle Brasseur / Lloyd Eisler	Canada	3	3	4.5
4	Evgenia Shishkova / Vadim Naumov	Russia	4	4	6.0
5	Jenni Meno / Todd Sand	United States	6	5	8.0
6	Radka Kovaříková / René Novotný	Czech Republic	5	6	8.5
7	Peggy Schwarz / Alexander König	Germany	7	8	11.5
8	Elena Berezhnaya / Oļegs Šļahovs	Latvia	9	9	13.5
9	Kyoko Ina / Jason Dungjen	United States	15	7	14.5
10	Kristy Sargeant / Kris Wirtz	Canada	11	10	15.5
11	Danielle Carr / Stephen Carr	Australia	10	11	16.5
12	Jamie Salé / Jason Turner	Canada	14	12	19.0
13	Anuschka Gläser / Axel Rauschenbach	Germany	12	13	19.0
14	Karen Courtland / Todd Reynolds	United States	13	14	20.5
15	Jacqueline Soames / John Jenkins	Great Britain	16	15	23.0
16	Olena Bilousivska / Ihor Maliar	Ukraine	17	16	24.5
17	Yelena Grigoryeva / Sergey Sheyko	Belarus	18	17	26.0
WD	Mandy Wötzel; Ingo Steuer	Germany	8	Withdrew from competition	
