= Oksana Ravilova =

Russian speed skater

Personal information
- Nationality: Russian
- Born: 20 May 1967 (age 57); Mirny, Russian SFSR, Soviet Union
- Children: Ekaterina Sloeva

Sport
- Sport: Speed skating

Oksana Ravilova (born 20 May 1967) is a Russian speed skater. She competed at the 1992, 1994 and the 1998 Winter Olympics.
