= Natalya Polozkova =

Russian speed skater

Personal information
- Born: 2 April 1972 (age 54) Chelyabinsk, Soviet Union
- Height: 1.70 m (5 ft 7 in)
- Weight: 62 kg (137 lb)

Sport
- Sport: Speed skating
- Club: SC Chelyabinsk

Natalya Fyodorovna Polozkova (née Kozlova; Russian: Наталья Фёдоровна Полозкова (Козлова); born 2 April 1972 in Chelyabinsk) is a retired Russian speed skater. She competed at the 1992, 1994 and 1998 Winter Olympics in the 500, 1000 and 1500 m events with the best achievement of fourth place in the 1500 m in 1992. In 1991 she won a European title in the 500 m as well as a gold medal at the Universiade in the 1500 m event.

Personal bests:

- 500 m – 40.02 (1998)
- 1000 m – 1:18.83 (1998)
- 1500 m – 1:56.26 (2001)
- 3000 m – 4:08.60 (2001)
- 5000 m – 7:32.92 (1999)

Polozkova graduated from the Ural Academy of Physical Education in 1994 and later studied for her PhD there. For 10 years she was married to Georgy Polozkov, the son of the famous Russian speed skater Lidiya Skoblikova.
