= Kerryn Rim =

Australian biathlete

Kerryn Michelle Pethybridge-Rim (born as Kerryn Michelle Pethybridge on 7 September 1962 in Myrtleford) is an Australian biathlete who competed at three Winter Olympics from 1992 to 1998. On her debut, she came 39ths and 32nd out of 68 and 66 competitors respectively in the 7.5 km and 10 km events. In 1994, she came 21st and 8th out of 69 and 68 racers in the 7.5 km and 15 km events respectively. In 1998 she became a triple Olympian and finished 47th and 43rd in the same two events. There were 64 competitors in each race. Rim's result remains the only top 20 finish by an Australian in the discipline of biathlon.
