= Emese Antal =

Austrian-Romanian speed skater (born 1971)

Emese Antal (born February 13, 1971, in Târgu Mureș) is a former ice speed skater from Romania, who after her marriage with an Austrian became known as Emese Dörfler-Antal. She represented Austria in two consecutive Winter Olympics, starting in 1994 in Hamar, Norway.
