= Lise Meloche =

Canadian biathlete

Lise Meloche was born in Ottawa in 1960 and began her athletic career in alpine skiing and sprint kayaking. She won the junior national championships K2 in 1979. Soon after she became more active in cross-country skiing and competed for Canada in 1983.

In 1984 Meloche transferred to biathlon and rapidly dominated women's biathlon, not only in North America but on the world scene for nearly eight years. Meloche was the first Canadian to win a world cup gold medal in biathlon.

Meloche was one of the pioneers of women's biathlon. In a career on the national team that spanned from 1983 to 1995, Meloche competed in over 200 World Cups and two Olympics (1992 and 1994). She won four World Cup gold medals, and medaled in seven events. She was overall third in the world in 1986. Her best placing at an Olympics was 17th in Lillehammer.

In 2022, Meloche won two gold and two silver medals at the World Masters Cross Country Skiing Championships.

Meloche is a kinesiologist and educator, and co-wrote the national cross-country skiing manual and coaching certification. She has published multiple books and videos on physical and mental conditioning and skills training. Meloche continues to complete in skiing, trail running, and snowshoeing, and coaches the largest multi-sport program in Canada (Natural Fitness Lab) with her husband, himself a national champion.
