= Ingrid Liepa =

Canadian speed skater

Personal information
- Born: 24 March 1966 (age 59) Ottawa, Ontario, Canada

Sport
- Sport: Speed skating

Ingrid Liepa (born 24 March 1966) is a Canadian speed skater. She competed at the 1994 Winter Olympics and the 1998 Winter Olympics.
