= Michelle Morton =

Canadian speed skater

Personal information
- Born: 11 June 1972 (age 53) Calgary, Alberta, Canada

Sport
- Sport: Speed skating

Michelle Morton (born 11 June 1972) is a Canadian speed skater. She competed at the 1994 Winter Olympics and the 1998 Winter Olympics.
