= 1994 Winter Olympics =

Multi-sport event in Lillehammer, Norway

XVII Olympic Winter Games
- Emblem of the 1994 Winter Olympics (Note: The emblem is a stylized aurora borealis (northern lights) and snow crystals.)
- Location: Lillehammer, Norway
- Motto: Fire in your heart (Norwegian: Se ilden lyse)
- Nations: 67
- Athletes: 1,738 (1,216 men, 522 women)
- Events: 61 in 6 sports (12 disciplines)
- Opening: 12 February 1994
- Closing: 27 February 1994
- Opened by: King Harald V
- Closed by: IOC President Juan Antonio Samaranch
- Cauldron: Crown Prince Haakon
- Stadium: Lysgårdsbakken

The 1994 Winter Olympics, officially known as the XVII Olympic Winter Games (Norwegian: De 17. olympiske vinterleker; Nynorsk: Dei 17. olympiske vinterleikane) and commonly known as Lillehammer '94, were an international winter multi-sport event held from 12 to 27 February 1994 in and around Lillehammer, Norway. Having lost the bid for the 1992 Winter Olympics to Albertville in France, Lillehammer was awarded the 1994 Winter Games on 15 September 1988, two days before the 1988 Summer Olympics opening ceremonies at the 94th IOC Session in Seoul, South Korea. Due to the calendar changes made in 1986, this was the only time that the Winter Olympics took place two years after the previous Winter Games, and the first to be held in a different year from the Summer Olympics. This was the first Winter Olympics that took place in a year with the Asian Games, Commonwealth Games, and FIFA World Cup. This was the second Olympic Games of any type hosted in Norway — the first being the 1952 Winter Olympics in Oslo — and the fourth Olympics overall to be held in a Nordic country, after the 1912 Summer Olympics in Stockholm, Sweden, and the 1952 Summer Olympics in Helsinki, Finland. Lillehammer is the northernmost city ever to host the Olympic Games.

Although Lillehammer Municipality was the main host, some events were held in neighboring municipalities, and the speed skating events were held in Hamar Municipality, some ice hockey matches were played in Gjøvik Municipality, and the Alpine skiing events were held in Øyer Municipality and Ringebu Municipality. Sixty-seven National Olympic Committees and 1,737 athletes participated in six sports and sixty-one events. Fourteen countries made their Olympic debuts, of which nine were former Soviet republics. The Games also saw the introduction of stricter and more rigid qualifying rules, reducing the number of under-performing participants. Six new events were introduced into the Olympic programme: new distances in short-track speed skating and aerials, and speed skating events were held indoors. Almost two million people spectated at the Games, which were the first to have the Olympic Truce in effect. The Olympics were followed by the 1994 Winter Paralympics from 10 to 19 March.

Manuela Di Centa and Lyubov Yegorova dominated women's cross-country skiing, taking five and four medals for Italy and Russia respectively. A crowd of more than 100,000 saw Italy beat Norway by 0.4 seconds in the men's 4 × 10 km relay. Vreni Schneider won a complete set of medals for Switzerland in Alpine skiing, while Norway took a podium sweep in the men's combined competition. In ladies' singles figure skating, 16-year-old Ukrainian Oksana Baiul won gold, narrowly defeating Nancy Kerrigan, who won silver; this was the first Ukrainian medal at the Olympics in their first independent appearance. Johann Olav Koss won three speed skating golds for Norway, while 13-year-old Kim Yun-mi from South Korea became the youngest-ever Olympic gold medalist. Sweden defeated Canada in a dramatic penalty shootout in the ice hockey final. Russia topped the medal table, winning 11 gold medals, while Norway collected the highest number of medals overall, with 26. The event also gained notoriety for the assault of Nancy Kerrigan.

== Host city selection ==
Location of Lillehammer in Norway

The idea for an Olympic bid for Norway was born in 1981, when Falun in neighbouring Sweden was defeated by Calgary in Canada to host the 1988 Winter Olympics. Along with the Norwegian government, the bid was also publicly encouraged and supported by the Swedish government, largely to help stimulate the economy of their inland counties. Lillehammer originally bid for the 1992 Games but came fourth in the voting, with the Games ultimately awarded to Albertville, France. In 1986, at the 91st IOC Session in Lausanne, the IOC announced the intent to separate the Summer and Winter editions (which had been held in the same year since the inception of the Winter Olympics in 1924) after the 1992 Games. The two editions of the Olympics have since alternated every two years during the four-year cycle. Lillehammer subsequently launched another bid, now for the 1994 Games, with some drastic modifications of the project, such as a new indoor speed skating venue and an additional ice hall in Lillehammer. Supplementary government guarantees and funds were secured for the new bid.

Three other locations put in bids for the 1994 Games: Anchorage (United States), Östersund (Sweden), and Sofia (Bulgaria). Lillehammer was elected to host the 1994 Winter Games at the 94th IOC Session, held in Seoul on 15 September 1988, two days before the start of the 1988 Summer Olympics.

1994 Winter Olympics bidding results
City	Country	Round		
City	Country	1	2	3
Lillehammer	Norway	25	30	45
Östersund	Sweden	19	33	39
Anchorage	United States	23	22	—
Sofia	Bulgaria	17	—	—

== Organization ==
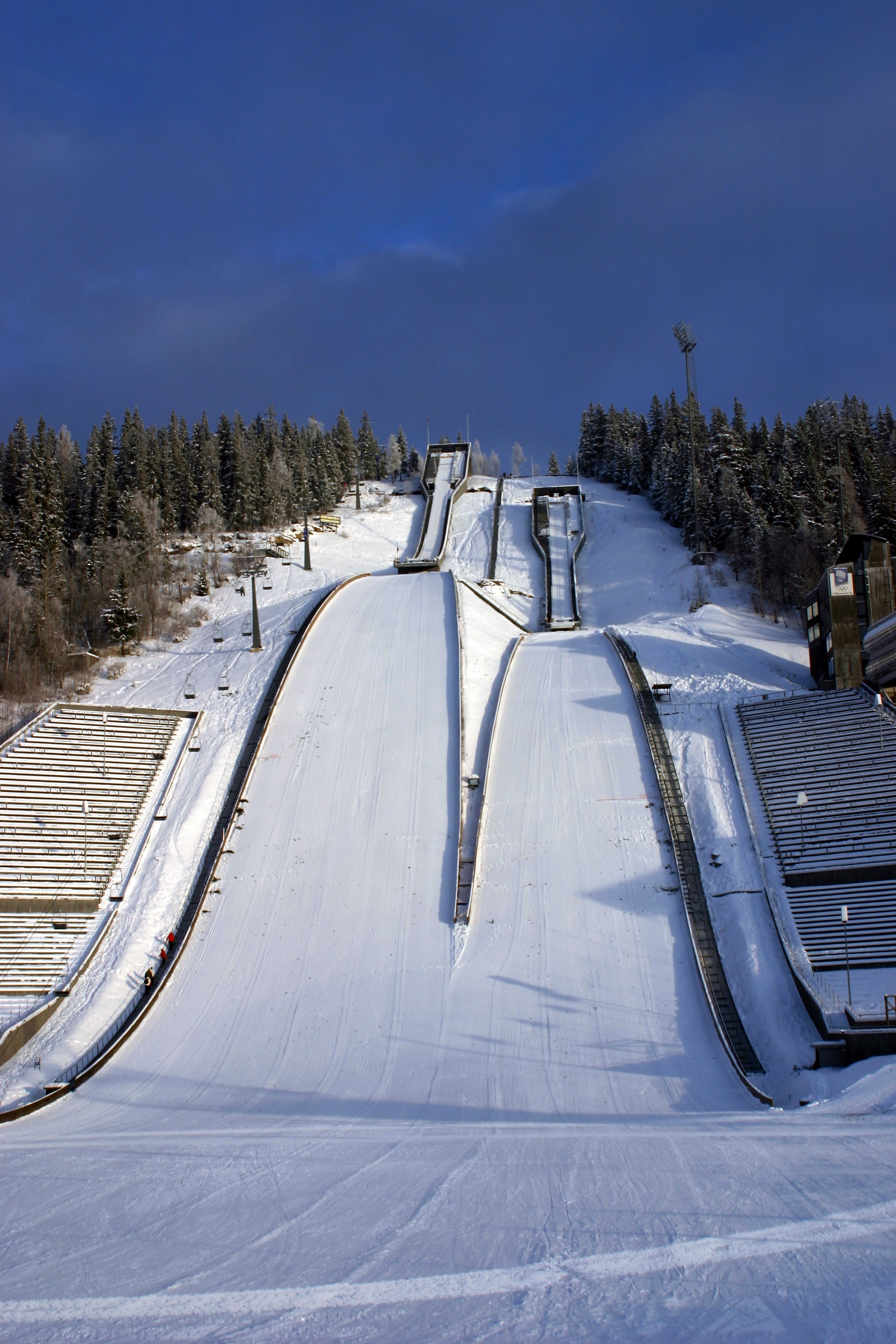
The ski jumping hill Lysgårdsbakken was the venue of the opening and closing ceremonies

The overall responsibility for the games was held by the Lillehammer Olympic Organizing Committee, which was created on 14 November 1988 and led by Gerhard Heiberg. Between 1989 and 1993, the committee was reorganized several times with various subsidiaries. On 11 February 1993, it became a joint venture owned 51% by Lillehammer Municipality (as main stakeholder), 24.5% by the Government of Norway, and 24.5% by the Norwegian Olympic Committee. This model was also used for the Lillehammer Paralympic Organizing Committee. The Norwegian government had issued a guarantee for the Games and also covered the expenses related to infrastructure. The total cost of the Games was 7.4 billion Norwegian krone (NOK), of which NOK 0.95 billion was expended by the ministries, NOK 4.48 billion was for operations and event expenses, and NOK 1.67 billion was for investments. The Games had a revenue of NOK 2.71 billion, of which NOK 1.43 billion was from television rights, NOK 0.65 billion was from sponsors, and NOK 0.15 billion was from ticket sales.

Production and execution of the broadcasting, which cost NOK 462 million, was a joint venture of the Norwegian Broadcasting Corporation (NRK), the CTV (Canada) (CTV), and the European Broadcasting Union (EBU) (the NRK is part of the collaboration of EBU members). NRK and EBU had 1,424 people working at the Olympics, while international broadcasters sent an additional 4,050 accredited broadcasting personnel. The transmission rights for the games were held by EBU in Europe, CBS in the United States, NHK in Japan, CTV in Canada, the Asia-Pacific Broadcasting Union, Nine Network in Australia, as well as other broadcasters in other countries. The total transmission rights price was 350 million United States dollars, 310 million of which were paid only by CBS. This value was attributed in part to the Harding–Kerrigan affair. As of 2010, the viewership in the United States was still the highest ever for the Winter Olympics.

NOK 460 million was used on information technology, with the main system running on an IBM AS/400. 3,500 media terminals were in use during the games based on the Info '94 system; it was the first Winter Olympics to have terminals installed abroad. Seiko delivered the time-keeping devices. Telecommunications were delivered by Telenor, including signal transmission. This included a mobile radio network with nine base stations.

== Cost and cost overrun ==
The Oxford Olympics Study established the outturn cost of the Lillehammer 1994 Winter Olympics at US$2.2 billion in 2015-dollars and cost overrun at 277% in real terms. This includes sports-related costs only, that is, (i) operational costs incurred by the organizing committee for the purpose of staging the Games, e.g., expenditures for technology, transportation, workforce, administration, security, catering, ceremonies, and medical services, and (ii) direct capital costs incurred by the host city and country or private investors to build, e.g., the competition venues, the Olympic village, international broadcast center, and media and press center, which are required to host the Games. Indirect capital costs are not included, such as for road, rail, or airport infrastructure, or for hotel upgrades or other business investment incurred in preparation for the Games but not directly related to staging the Games. The cost and cost overrun for Lillehammer 1994 compares with costs of US$2.5 billion and a cost overrun of 13% for Vancouver 2010, and costs of US$51 billion and a cost overrun of 289% for Sochi 2014, the latter being the most costly Olympics to date. Average cost for Winter Games since 1960 is US$3.1 billion, average cost overrun is 142%.

== Events ==
There were 61 events contested in 6 sports (12 disciplines).

- Alpine skiing (10) ()
- Biathlon (6) ()
- Bobsleigh (2) ()
- Cross-country skiing (10) ()
- Figure skating (4) ()
- Freestyle skiing (4) ()
- Ice hockey (1) ()
- Luge (3) ()
- Nordic combined (2) ()
- Ski jumping (3) ()
- Short track speed skating (6) ()
- Speed skating (10) ()

=== Opening ceremony ===
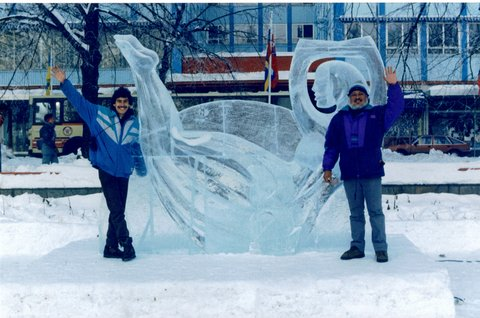
Mexican artist Abel Ramírez Águilar with an ice sculpture he created before the start of the Lillehammer Games

As the 1988 Winter Games, the Organizing Committee decided not to build a specific Olympic Stadium for the opening and closing ceremonies and opted to conduct them at the ski jumping hill, Lysgårdsbakken. Artistic content presented a range of Norwegian and Nordic cultures, including elements such as Sami joik, Telemark skiing, fiddlers and folk dancing, simulations of Norwegian traditional events, such as wedding processions, and the figure of vetter from Norse mythology. After speeches by Heiberg and IOC president Juan Antonio Samaranch, the Games were officially declared opened by King Harald V. and the Olympic Anthem was performed by the lyrical singer, Sissel Kyrkjebø. After, the Olympic Flame was to be carried down the ski jump before lighting the cauldron. Originally this task had rested upon Ole Gunnar Fidjestøl, but after he broke an arm in a practice jump, his back-up, Stein Gruben, received the honor. The cauldron was lit by Crown Prince Haakon. The Olympic oaths were taken by Vegard Ulvang for the athletes and Kari Kåring for the officials.

=== Alpine skiing ===
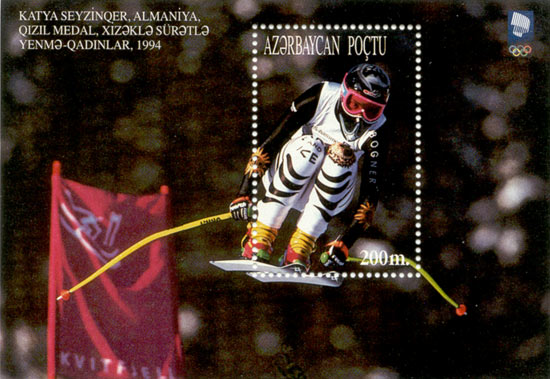

Since the 1992 Games, the rules for combined changed, where the winner was determined by total time instead of points. The women's downhill was originally scheduled for Hafjell, but after protests due to the hill difficulties it was moved to Kvitfjell, which also hosted the men's downhill and super-G. In the men's events, Germany's Markus Wasmeier won two disciplines, giant slalom and super-G, finishing ahead of the United States's Tommy Moe on the super-G. Moe won the downhill ahead of Norway's Kjetil André Aamodt, who came in third in the super-G. Austria's Thomas Stangassinger won the slalom ahead of Italy's Alberto Tomba. In the combined, Norway took a medal sweep, with Lasse Kjus winning ahead of Aamodt and Harald Christian Strand Nilsen.

In the women's events, Switzerland's Vreni Schneider was the most successful, winning the slalom, taking silver in combined and taking bronze in giant slalom. The only other athlete to take multiple medals was Italy's Isolde Kostner, who took a third place in both downhill and super-G. The downhill was won by Germany's Katja Seizinger, super-G by the United States' Diann Roffe, the giant slalom by Italy's Deborah Compagnoni, and the combined by Sweden's Pernilla Wiberg.

=== Biathlon ===
Russia and Germany split all the individual men's medals. In the 10 km sprint, Russia's Sergei Tchepikov won ahead of Ricco Groß, both with a clean sheet. Bronze winner Sergei Tarasov won the 20 km individual ahead of Germany's Frank Luck and Sven Fischer. Germany easily revenged itself by winning the 4 × 7.5 km relay ahead of Russia and France. In the women's class, Canada's Myriam Bédard won both the individual events, finishing ahead of Belarus' Svetlana Paramygina on the 7.5 km sprint and ahead of France's Anne Briand on the 15 km individual. In the 4 × 7.5 km relay, the format since 1992 was changed from three to four participants. Russia, with a clean sheet, won ahead of Germany, who made six misses, with France taking the bronze.

=== Bobsleigh ===
In two-man, Switzerland took the top two places, with Gustav Weder, Donat Acklin winning 0.05 seconds ahead of Reto Götschi and Guido Acklin, who were again 0.15 seconds ahead of Italy's Günther Huber and Stefano Ticci placing third. In four-man, Germany-II, consisting of Harald Czudaj, Karsten Brannasch, Olaf Hampel and Alexander Szelig, finished 0.06 seconds ahead of Switzerland-I and 0.23 ahead of Germany-I.

=== Cross-country skiing ===
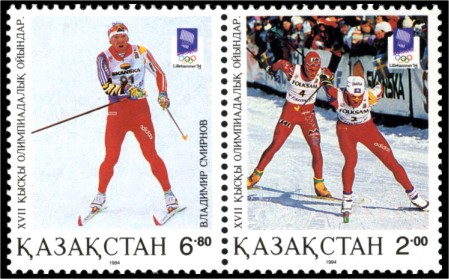

Participants from five countries took all the medals of the ten events. Starting in 1994, the Olympics alternated which of the medium-distance and long-distance races had classical and freestyle. men's 4 × 10 km relay was watched by a crowd of nearly 150,000. Norway, Italy and Finland followed each other tightly for three and a half rounds, with the second and third exchange of the three talking place within 1.1 seconds of each other. Finland fell behind in the end, and Norwegian Bjørn Dæhlie and Italian Silvio Fauner battled to the end, with Italy beating Norway by 0.4 seconds. Dæhlie won the 10 km classical and 15 km freestyle pursuit, while taking silver in the 30 km freestyle. Kazakhstan's Vladimir Smirnov won the 50 km classical, in addition to silver in the 10 km and the 15 km. Norway's Thomas Alsgaard won the 30 km, while Finland's Mika Myllylä took an individual silver and a bronze.

Italy's Manuela Di Centa and Russia's Lyubov Yegorova dominated the women's events. They took five and four medals each, respectively, and between them winning all the races. Yegorova finished ahead of Di Centa on the 5 km classical and the 10 km pursuit, while Di Centa finished ahead of Yegorova on the 15 km freestyle, and also won the 30 km classical ahead of Norway's Marit Wold. Finland's Marja-Liisa Kirvesniemi took two bronze medals, in 5 km and 30 km. In the 4 × 5 km relay, Norway and Russia kept up with each other until the final stage, in which Anita Moen lost to Yegorova, with Italy finishing third. With Yegorova's sixth career gold, she was tied as the most-winning Winter Olympic participant.

=== Figure skating ===
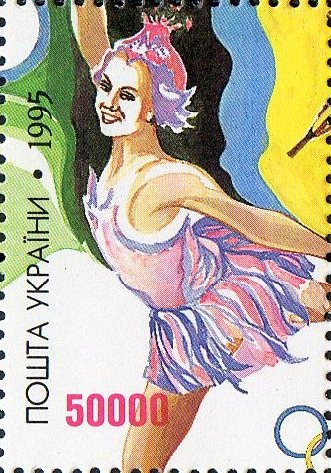
Oksana Baiul

On 6 January, Tonya Harding's ex-husband, Jeff Gillooly and his friend Shawn Eckardt, conspired with Shane Stant to club fellow female figure skater Nancy Kerrigan in the knee. Both Harding and Kerrigan were selected for the Olympic team. After Harding admitted to helping to cover up the attack, the United States Olympic Committee initiated proceedings to remove her from the Olympic team, but Harding retained her place after threatening legal action. In the ladies' singles, Ukraine's Oksana Baiul narrowly won ahead of Kerrigan and Chen Lu, with Harding finishing eighth. In the men's singles, Russia's Alexei Urmanov won ahead of Canada's Elvis Stojko and France's Philippe Candeloro. Relaxation of the rules led to several former stars returning, such as ice dancing 1984 Champions Great Britain's Jayne Torvill and Christopher Dean, who took a bronze behind Russians Oksana Grishuk and Evgeny Platov, and Maya Usova and Alexander Zhulin. In pair skating, the Russians also took a double, with Ekaterina Gordeeva and Sergei Grinkov winning ahead of Natalia Mishkutenok and Artur Dmitriev.

=== Freestyle skiing ===
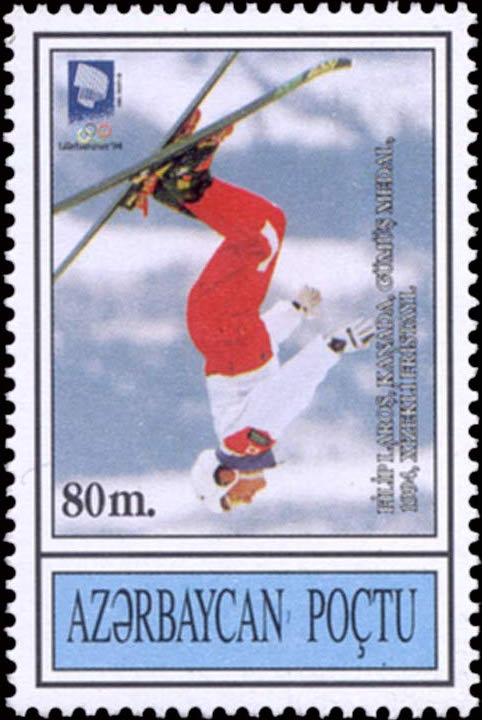

Aerials was added as a discipline, after it had been a demonstration sport at the previous two games. Ski ballet, which had been a demonstration sport in 1992, was dropped. Canada dominated the men's events, with Jean-Luc Brassard winning the men's moguls ahead of Russian Sergey Shupletsov. In the men's aerials, Switzerlands's Andreas Schönbächler won ahead of Canada's Philippe LaRoche and Lloyd Langlois, with Canadians also claiming the fourth and sixth places. In the women's disciplines, Norway was the only nation to take two medals; Stine Lise Hattestad won the moguls ahead of the United States' Liz McIntyre. In the aerials, Lina Cheryazova won, claiming Uzbekistan's only medal, ahead of Sweden's Marie Lindgren and Norway's Hilde Synnøve Lid.

=== Ice hockey ===
Twelve teams participated in the ice hockey tournament, divided into two groups. Each played as a single round robin, with the four best advancing to the single elimination medal tournament. Group A saw Finland win all five matches, while the host nation lost all theirs. Also Germany, the Czech Republic and Russia advanced from the group, all with three victories. Group B was won by Slovakia ahead of Canada, Sweden and the United States. The quarter-finals saw the Czech Republic, the United States, Germany and Slovakia eliminated. In the semi-finals, Canada beat Finland 5–3, while Sweden beat Russia 4–3. After the final period of the final, the match was a 2–2 tie, resulting in a shoot-out. After six shots, it was tied 2–2 until Sweden's Peter Forsberg beat Corey Hirsch, making the Swedes win after Paul Kariya missed his shot. This led to Tomas Jonsson, Håkan Loob and Mats Näslund becoming the first three members of the Triple Gold Club.

=== Luge ===
Italy, Germany and Austria collected all the medals in the luge events. Germany's Georg Hackl won the men's singles, making him the first to defend an Olympic title in the event in thirty years. He finished ahead of Austria's Markus Prock and Italy's Armin Zöggeler. In the doubles, the two Italian teams finished on top, with Kurt Brugger and Wilfried Huber winning ahead of Hansjörg Raffl and Norbert Huber. In the women's singles, Italy's Gerda Weissensteiner won ahead of Germany's Susi Erdmann and Austria's Andrea Tagwerker. The own debuts was start Nedžad Lomigora from Bosnia and Herzegovina, Marco Feder from Liechtenstein, Sminon J. Payne from Bermuda, Paul Hix from United Kingdom, Josef Svarek from Slovakia, Roger White from Australia.

=== Nordic combined ===
Although the events were the same, since the 1992 Games there was a rule change so that instead of jumping three times and taking the points for the best two, the competitors only jumped twice. In the individual normal hill/15 km, Japan's Kenji Ogiwara had only lost a single event in the season's World Cup, but came in sixth on the hill, which was won by Norway's Fred Børre Lundberg. He won the event after finishing eight-best in the skiing, ahead of Japan's Takanori Kono, Norway's Bjarte Engen Vik and Ogiwara in fourth. In the team normal hill/3 x 10 km, Japan finished first, third and fifth among the jumpers, giving them a 5:07 minute lead over Norway and finishing 4:49 minutes ahead. Switzerland took the bronze.

=== Short track speed skating ===
Short track speed skating was dominated by South Korea, who won four of the six events. After the discipline's debut in 1992, 1994 featured two new events, the men's 500 meters and the women's 1000 meters. South Korea's Chae Ji-Hoon won the men's 500 meters, while taking silver on the 1000 meters behind countryman Kim Ki-Hoon, who defended his 1992 gold. The bronze was won by Canada's Marc Gagnon, who won the B final. In the A final, countryman Derrick Campbell was obstructed by Great Britain's Nicky Gooch, who was disqualified. Campbell got up and started celebrating his bronze medal, when he discovered he had not completed the race.

In the men's 5000 meter relay, South Korea did not enter after a fall in the sole qualifying event, which took place in March 1993. Canada fell during the final, which saw Italy take a clear victory ahead of the United States, who were marginally ahead of Australia. The United States' Eric Flaim became the first to take Olympic medals in both short track and long track speed skating, while Australia took its first Winter Olympic medal ever. Six people took the individual medals in the women's events, with the United States' Cathy Turner defending her 1992 gold on the 500 meters and South Korea's Chun Lee-Kyung taking the gold in 1000 meters. South Korea won the 3000 meter relay with a team of four girls under 19. At 13, Kim Yoon-Mi became the world's youngest Olympic gold medalist.

=== Ski jumping ===
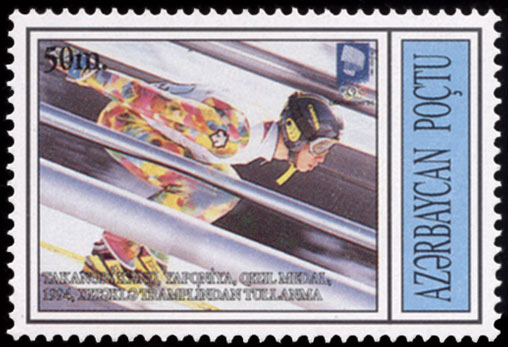

Norway won three of the six individual medals, with Norway's Espen Bredesen winning the normal hill ahead of Norway's Lasse Ottesen and Germany's Dieter Thoma. In the large hill, Germany's Jens Weißflog won ahead of Bredesen and Austria's Andreas Goldberger. In the large hill team, the 1994 Games introduced new rules whereby all four jumps in each round counted, and not just the best three. Neither Norway nor Finland, who between them had won all but one former Olympic team jump, managed to collect a medal. The event became a duel between Germany and Japan, with only a point separating them after the first round of jumps. Masahiko Harada had the last jump, and would secure a gold if he managed 105 meters but lost his 'cool' mistiming his leap and landed at 97.5 meters, giving the gold to the Germans.

=== Speed skating ===
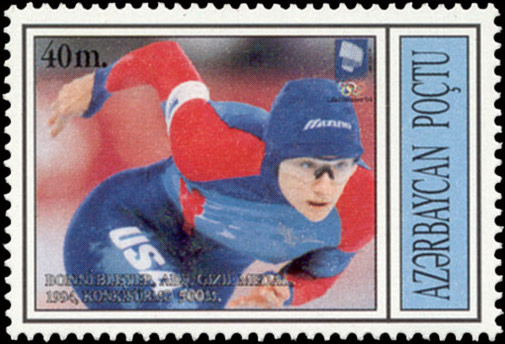

In 1989, the International Skating Union mandated that, from the 1994 Olympics onwards, speed skating events would be held indoors to avoid interference from wind and weather conditions in the competitions. The 1994 Games also introduced a new system of qualification rules, limiting the number of participants in the men's 5000 meters and women's 3000 meters to 32, and only allowing the 16 best in each of these events to participate in the men's 10000 meters and the women's 5000 meters.

Norway's Johann Olav Koss took three golds, in the men's 1,500 meters, 5000 meters and 10000 meters. In the latter two, he finished ahead of fellow countryman Kjell Storelid. The men's 500 meters was won by Russia's Aleksandr Golubev ahead of fellow countryman Sergey Klevchenya, while the men's 1000 meters was won by American Dan Jansen. For women, American Bonnie Blair defended her two 1992 golds in 500 meters and 1000 meters. Austria's Emese Hunyady won the 1500 meters ahead of Russia's Svetlana Bazhanova and Germany's Gunda Niemann. However, Bazhanova took gold ahead of Nemeth-Hunyady on the 3000 meters, with Germany's Claudia Pechstein in third. Pechstein would go on to win the 5000 meters ahead of Niemann.

=== Closing ceremony ===
At the closing ceremonies, also held at Lysgårdsbakken, all spectators were handed a flashlight with the inscription "Remember Sarajevo"—the host of the 1984 Winter Olympics which was at worst moment of the Bosnian War, the Siege of Sarajevo. The first entrants on the stage were Liv Ullmann and Thor Heyerdahl, followed by the athletes' precession. After the Olympic flag had been transferred to Nagano mayor Tasuka Tsukada, speeches were held by Lillehammer mayor Audun Tron, Heiberg and Samaranch. The latter used his speech to remind about Sarajevo's situation, before giving Heiberg IOC's gold medal. Artistic presentations followed with many of the themes from the opening ceremony.At the 15-minute presentation as the next host city, Nagano was presented to world as a modern Yama-uba, also the 1998 Winter Olympics mascots, the Snowlets, was also presented on a public eye for the first time. Of the 2,200 people performing in the opening and closing ceremonies, only 50 were professionals.

== Venues ==
Map of the venues

The games were spread out over ten venues in five municipalities in two counties, Oppland and Hedmark. Lillehammer, with 25,000 inhabitants, and Hamar and Gjøvik, both with 27,000 inhabitants, are all situated on the lake Mjøsa. Gjøvik and Hamar are located 45 and 54 kilometers (28 and 34 mi) south of Lillehammer. Hunderfossen is located 15 kilometers (9.3 mi) north of Lillehammer, but lies within the municipality. Øyer and Ringebu, both with just under 5,000 inhabitants, are located 18 and 50 kilometers (11 and 31 mi) north of Lillehammer, in the valley Gudbrandsdalen. Lillehammer had four venues, Hamar had two venues, while Hunderfossen, Gjøvik, Øyer and Ringebu had one venue each.

In Lillehammer, Lysgårdsbakken features twin ski jumping hills. The large hill has a hill size of 138 and a critical point of 120, while the normal hill has a hill size of 100 and a critical point of 90. The hill has capacity for 35,000 spectators and hosted, in addition to the ski jumping events, the opening and closing ceremonies. Birkebeineren Skistadion featured cross-country skiing and biathlon, with the stadium itself having a capacity for 31,000 spectators during cross-country skiing and 13,500 during biathlon. In addition, spectators could watch from along the tracks. Kanthugen Freestyle Arena featured a capacity for 15,000 spectators. All the outdoor skiing arenas had free areas, which saw up to 25,000 extra spectators at the team jump and 75,000 extra spectators at the 50 km.

Lillehammer Olympic Bobsleigh and Luge Track is located at Hunderfossen. It had a capacity for 10,000 spectators and is the only bobsleigh and luge track in the Nordic countries. Ice hockey was played at two venues, in Håkons Hall in Lillehammer and Gjøvik Olympic Cavern Hall in Gjøvik. Håkons Hall has a capacity for 10,500 spectators, and also features the Norwegian Olympic Museum. The Cavern Hall is built as a man-made cave and had a capacity for 5,300 spectators. Skating events took place at two venues in Hamar. Vikingskipet had a capacity for 10,600 spectators and featured speed skating events, while figure skating and short-track speed skating were held at Hamar Olympic Amphitheatre. Alpine skiing was split between two ski resorts: Hafjell in Øyer and Kvitfjell in Ringebu. The former was used for the slalom and giant slalom, while the latter hosted downhill and super-G.

Spectators relied heavily on the use of buses and trains for transportation. Downtown Lillehammer and the axis between Lillehammer and Oslo were the most limiting areas, and the Norwegian State Railways ran up to 22 trains per day between Oslo and Lillehammer. Trains were also used northwards towards Trondheim, while other areas were served by bus. All the venues were located along railway lines, making use of spectators walking from the stations to the venues to limit road congestion, although special services were available for disabled people. Shuttle buses were established between venues and also connected to park and ride facilities.

== Participating National Olympic Committees ==
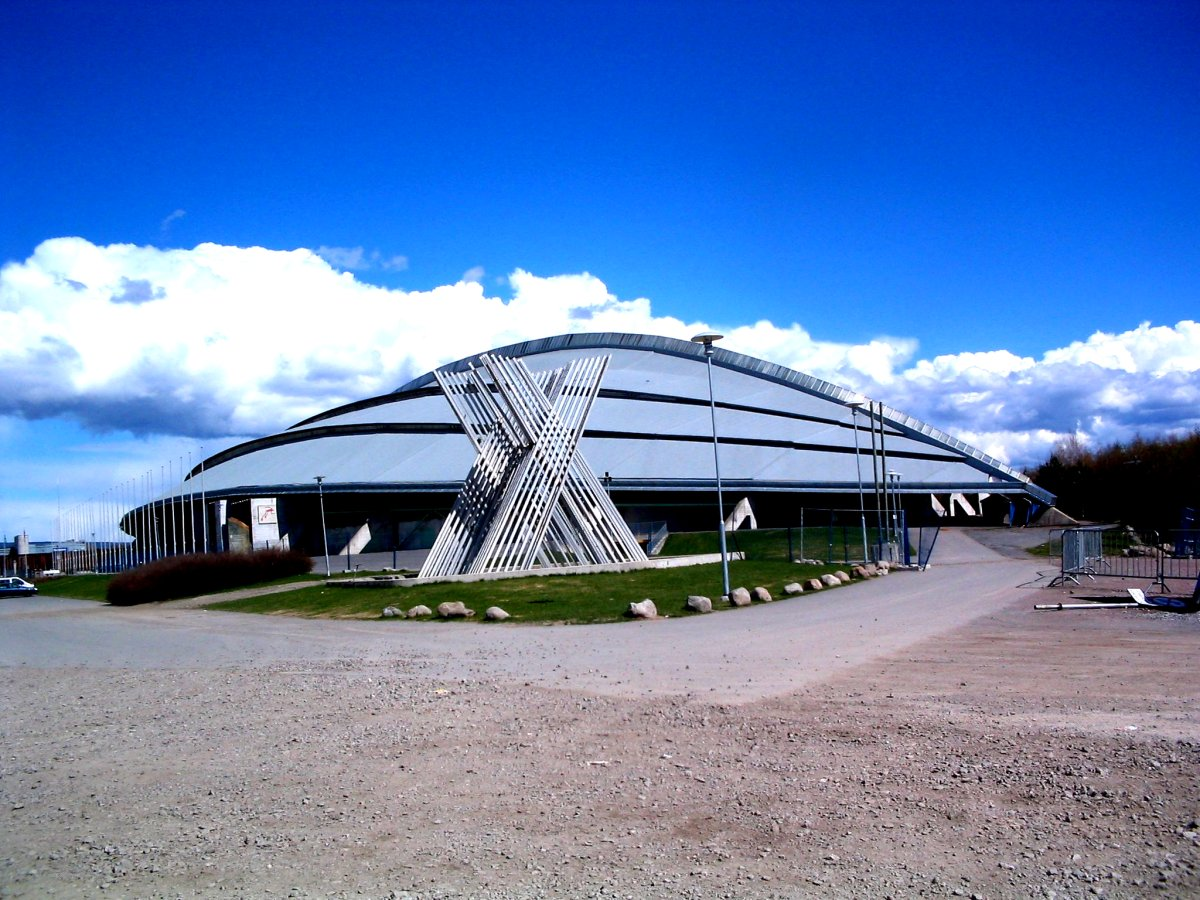
Vikingskipet in Hamar was the venue for speed skating.

A record 67 nations participated in the 1994 Winter Olympics. These Games were the first to implement stricter qualifying standards that prevented low-performing athletes from competing without meeting minimum requirements. As a consequence, eleven "warm-weather countries" that signed up to take part in the Games were mostly absent because very few of their athletes succeeded in qualifying; the number of African athletes fell from nineteen in 1992 to three in 1994. These rules were, however, not applied to bobsled events, enabling the U.S. Virgin Islands, Trinidad and Tobago and Jamaica to compete in that sport. On 25 October 1993, the United Nations General Assembly urged its members to observe the Olympic truce, lasting from seven days before the start of the Games until seven days after the close, making the Lillehammer Olympics the first to observe the truce. The IOC appealed for a truce in the ongoing Bosnian War and the Siege of Sarajevo, the city that had hosted the 1984 Winter Olympics.

The former Soviet republics of Armenia, Belarus, Georgia, Kazakhstan, Kyrgyzstan, Moldova, Ukraine and Uzbekistan participated as independent nations. This was the first time since the 1912 Summer Olympics that Russia competed independently at the Olympic Games. Athletes of these countries previously competed in the Winter Olympics as part of the Soviet Union team until 1991. The Czech Republic and Slovakia participated for the first time, after the break-up of Czechoslovakia in 1993. Bosnia and Herzegovina made their Olympic debut, following their independence from Yugoslavia in 1992; the composition of their four-man bob team was one Croat, two Bosniaks and a Serb, mirroring the ethnic diversity of the country. This was also Israel's first appearance at the Winter Olympics and a member of the European Olympic Committees. American Samoa participated for the first time, as did Trinidad and Tobago.

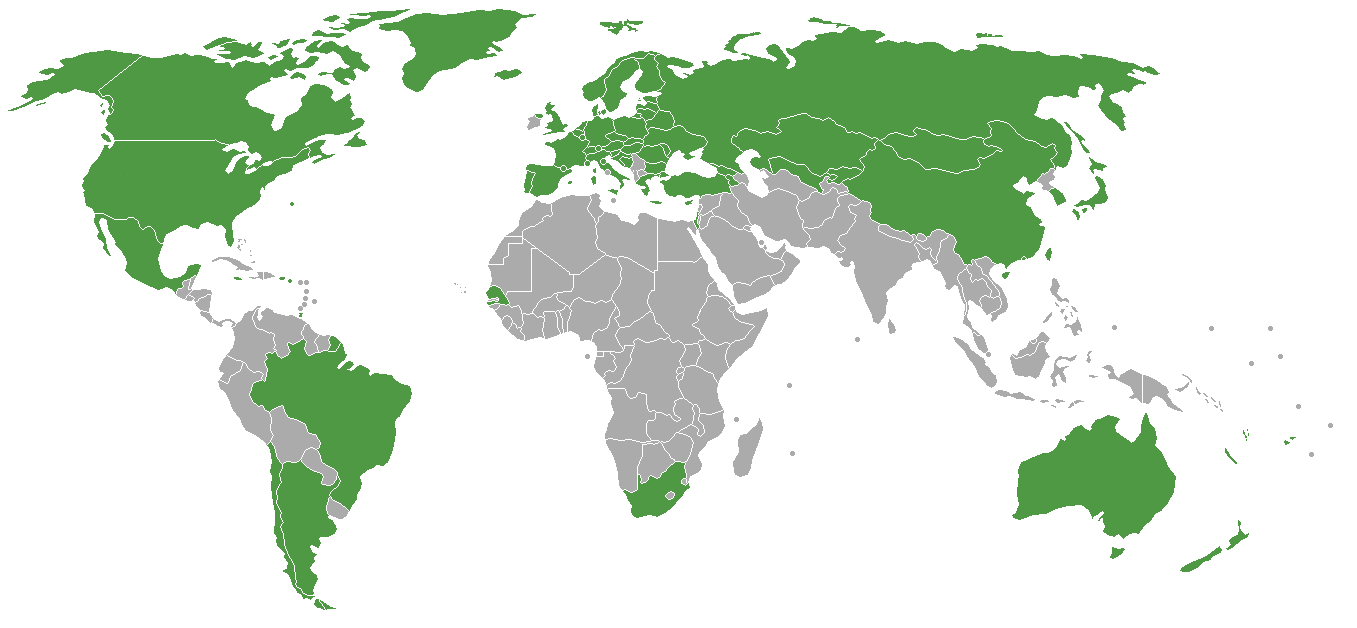
Participating NOCs

Participating National Olympic Committees
- American Samoa (2)
- Andorra (6)
- Argentina (10)
- Armenia (2)
- Australia (25)
- Austria (80)
- Belarus (33)
- Belgium (5)
- Bermuda (1)
- Bosnia and Herzegovina (10)
- Brazil (1)
- Bulgaria (17)
- Canada (95)
- Chile (3)
- China (24)
- Chinese Taipei (2)
- Croatia (3)
- Cyprus (1)
- Czech Republic (63)
- Denmark (4)
- Estonia (26)
- Fiji (1)
- Finland (61)
- France (98)
- Georgia (5)
- Germany (112)
- Great Britain (32)
- Greece (9)
- Hungary (16)
- Iceland (5)
- Israel (1)
- Italy (104)
- Jamaica (4)
- Japan (59)
- Kazakhstan (29)
- Kyrgyzstan (1)
- Latvia (27)
- Liechtenstein (10)
- Lithuania (6)
- Luxembourg (1)
- Mexico (1)
- Moldova (2)
- Monaco (5)
- Mongolia (1)
- Netherlands (21)
- New Zealand (7)
- Norway (88) (host)
- Poland (28)
- Portugal (1)
- Puerto Rico (5)
- Romania (23)
- Russia (113)
- San Marino (3)
- Senegal (1)
- Slovakia (42)
- Slovenia (22)
- South Africa (2)
- South Korea (21)
- Spain (13)
- Sweden (84)
- Switzerland (59)
- Trinidad and Tobago (2)
- Turkey (1)
- Ukraine (37)
- United States (147)
- Uzbekistan (7)
- Virgin Islands (8)

=== Number of athletes by National Olympic Committee ===
1,737 athletes from 67 NOCs

NOC	Country	Athletes
USA	United States	147
RUS	Russia	113
GER	Germany	112
ITA	Italy	104
FRA	France	98
CAN	Canada	95
NOR	Norway	88
SWE	Sweden	84
AUT	Austria	80
CZE	Czech Republic	63
FIN	Finland	61
JPN	Japan	59
SUI	Switzerland	59
SVK	Slovakia	42
UKR	Ukraine	37
BLR	Belarus	33
GBR	Great Britain	32
KAZ	Kazakhstan	29
POL	Poland	28
LAT	Latvia	27
EST	Estonia	26
AUS	Australia	25
CHN	China	24
ROU	Romania	23
SLO	Slovenia	22
KOR	South Korea	21
NED	Netherlands	21
BUL	Bulgaria	17
HUN	Hungary	16
ESP	Spain	13
ARG	Argentina	10
BIH	Bosnia and Herzegovina	10
LIE	Liechtenstein	10
GRE	Greece	9
ISV	Virgin Islands	8
NZL	New Zealand	7
UZB	Uzbekistan	7
AND	Andorra	6
LTU	Lithuania	6
BEL	Belgium	5
GEO	Georgia	5
ISL	Iceland	5
MON	Monaco	5
PUR	Puerto Rico	5
DEN	Denmark	4
JAM	Jamaica	4
CHI	Chile	3
CRO	Croatia	3
SMR	San Marino	3
ASA	American Samoa	2
ARM	Armenia	2
MDA	Moldova	2
RSA	South Africa	2
TPE	Chinese Taipei	2
TRI	Trinidad and Tobago	2
BER	Bermuda	1
BRA	Brazil	1
CYP	Cyprus	1
FIJ	Fiji	1
ISR	Israel	1
KGZ	Kyrgyzstan	1
LUX	Luxembourg	1
MEX	Mexico	1
MGL	Mongolia	1
POR	Portugal	1
SEN	Senegal	1
TUR	Turkey	1

== Calendar ==
All dates are in Central European Time (UTC+1)

OC	Opening ceremony	●	Event competitions	1	Event finals	CC	Closing ceremony

February 1994	12th Sat	13th Sun	14th Mon	15th Tue	16th Wed	17th Thu	18th Fri	19th Sat	20th Sun	21st Mon	22nd Tue	23rd Wed	24th Thu	25th Fri	26th Sat	27th Sun	Events
Ceremonies	OC															CC	—N/a
Alpine skiing		1	●	1		1		1	●	1		1	1	1	1	1	10
Biathlon							1		1			2		1	1		6
Bobsleigh								●	1						●	1	2
Cross country skiing		1	1	1		2		1		1	1		1			1	10
Figure skating		●		1		●	●	1	●	1		●		1			4
Freestyle skiing				●	2					●			2				4
Ice hockey	●	●	●	●	●	●	●	●	●	●	●	●	●	●	●	1	1
Luge		●	1	●	1		1										3
Nordic combined							●	1				●	1				2
Short track											2		●		4		6
Ski jumping									1		1			1			3
Speed skating		1	1		1	1	1	1	1	1		1		1			10
Daily medal events		3	3	3	4	4	3	5	4	4	4	4	5	5	6	4	61
Cumulative total		3	6	9	13	17	20	25	29	33	37	41	46	51	57	61	61
February 1994	12th Sat	13th Sun	14th Mon	15th Tue	16th Wed	17th Thu	18th Fri	19th Sat	20th Sun	21st Mon	22nd Tue	23rd Wed	24th Thu	25th Fri	26th Sat	27th Sun	Total events

== Medal table ==
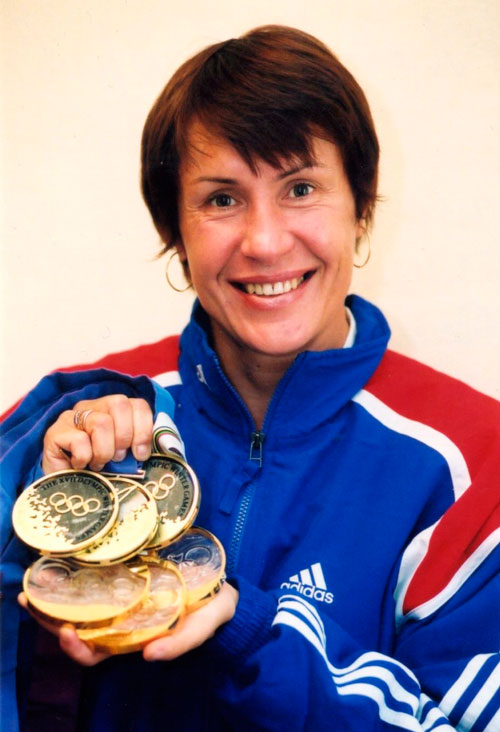
Lyubov Yegorova with Medals of 1994 Winter Olympics

Russia won the most golds, while Norway won the most medals overall. The following table presents the top ten nations, sorted by gold medals, with the host nation highlighted.

Rank	Nation	Gold	Silver	Bronze	Total
1	Russia	11	8	4	23
2	Norway*	10	11	5	26
3	Germany	9	7	8	24
4	Italy	7	5	8	20
5	United States	6	5	2	13
6	South Korea	4	1	1	6
7	Canada	3	6	4	13
8	Switzerland	3	4	2	9
9	Austria	2	3	4	9
10	Sweden	2	1	0	3
Totals (10 entries)		57	51	38	146

=== Podium sweeps ===
Date	Sport	Event	NOC	Gold	Silver	Bronze
13 February	Alpine skiing	Men's combined	Norway	Lasse Kjus	Kjetil André Aamodt	Harald Christian Strand Nilsen

== Notes ==
Winter Olympics
Preceded by Albertville	XVII Olympic Winter Games; Lillehammer; 1994	Succeeded by Nagano
