= Short-track speed skating at the 1994 Winter Olympics – Men's 5000 metre relay =

Men's 5000m relay at the XVII Olympic Winter Games
- Pictogram for short track
- Venue: Hamar Olympic Amphitheatre
- Dates: 24–26 February 1994
- Competitors: 33 from 8 nations
- Winning time: 7:11.74

Medalists
1st place, gold medalist(s)		Italy; Maurizio Carnino; Orazio Fagone; Hugo Herrnhof; Mirko Vuillermin
2nd place, silver medalist(s)		United States; Randy Bartz; John Coyle; Eric Flaim; Andy Gabel
3rd place, bronze medalist(s)		Australia; Steven Bradbury; Kieran Hansen; Andrew Murtha; Richard Nizielski

The men's 5000 metre relay in short track speed skating at the 1994 Winter Olympics took place on 24 and 26 February at the Hamar Olympic Amphitheatre.

== Results ==
=== Semifinals ===
The semifinals were held on 24 February. The top two teams in each semifinal qualified for the A final, while the third and fourth place teams advanced to the B Final.

Semifinal 1

Rank	Country	Athlete	Result	Notes
1	Italy	Maurizio Carnino; Orazio Fagone; Hugo Herrnhof; Mirko Vuillermin	7:13.34	QA OR
2	United States	Randy Bartz; John Coyle; Eric Flaim; Andy Gabel	7:18.58	QA
3	China	Li Jiajun; Li Lianli; Yang He; Zhang Hongbo	7:19.66	QB
4	Norway	Bjørnar Elgetun; Gisle Elvebakken; Morten Staubo; Øystein Carlsen	7:25.73	QB

Semifinal 2

Rank	Country	Athlete	Result	Notes
1	Canada	Frédéric Blackburn; Derrick Campbell; Marc Gagnon; Stephen Gough	7:13.76	QA
2	Australia	Steven Bradbury; Kieran Hansen; Andrew Murtha; Richard Nizielski	7:14.41	QA
3	Japan	Yuichi Akasaka; Tatsuyoshi Ishihara; Satoru Terao; Jun Uematsu	7:15.85	QB
4	New Zealand	Mike McMillen; Andrew Nicholson; Chris Nicholson; Tony Smith	7:21.58	QB

=== Finals ===
The four qualifying teams competed in Final A, while four others raced in Final B.

Final A

Rank	Country	Athlete	Result	Notes
1st place, gold medalist(s)	Italy	Maurizio Carnino; Orazio Fagone; Hugo Herrnhof; Mirko Vuillermin	7:11.74	OR
2nd place, silver medalist(s)	United States	Randy Bartz; John Coyle; Eric Flaim; Andy Gabel	7:13.37	
3rd place, bronze medalist(s)	Australia	Steven Bradbury; Kieran Hansen; Andrew Murtha; Richard Nizielski	7:13.68	
4	Canada	Frédéric Blackburn; Derrick Campbell; Marc Gagnon; Stephen Gough	7:20.40	

Final B

Rank	Country	Athlete	Result	Notes
5	Japan	Yuichi Akasaka; Tatsuyoshi Ishihara; Satoru Terao; Jun Uematsu	7:19.11	
6	Norway	Bjørnar Elgetun; Gisle Elvebakken; Morten Staubo; Tore Klevstuen	7:24.29	
–	China	Li Jiajun; Li Lianli; Yang He; Zhang Hongbo	DQ	
–	New Zealand	Mike McMillen; Andrew Nicholson; Chris Nicholson; Tony Smith	DQ	
