= Speed skating at the 1994 Winter Olympics – Men's 5000 metres =

Speed skating at the Olympics

Men's 5000 metres at the XVII Olympic Winter Games
- Venue: Hamar Olympic Hall
- Dates: 13 February 1994
- Competitors: 32 from 17 nations
- Winning time: 6:34.96 WR

Medalists
1st place, gold medalist(s)		Johann Olav Koss; Norway
2nd place, silver medalist(s)		Kjell Storelid; Norway
3rd place, bronze medalist(s)		Rintje Ritsma; Netherlands

The men's 5000 metres in speed skating at the 1994 Winter Olympics took place on 13 February, at the Hamar Olympic Hall. 32 competitors from 17 nations participated in the competition.

== Records ==
Prior to this competition, the existing world and Olympic records were as follows:

World record	Johann Olav Koss (NOR)	6:35.53	Hamar, Norway	4 December 1993
Olympic record	Tomas Gustafson (SWE)	6:44.63	Calgary, Canada	17 February 1988

The following new world and olympic records was set during this competition.

Date	Pair	Athlete	Country	Time	OR	WR
13 February	Pair 2	Kjell Storelid	Norway	6:42.68	OR	
13 February	Pair 4	Johann Olav Koss	Norway	6:34.96	OR	WR

== Results ==
Rank	Pair	Lane	Name	Country	Time	Time behind	Notes
1st place, gold medalist(s)	4	o	Johann Olav Koss	Norway	6:34.96	–	(WR)
2nd place, silver medalist(s)	2	i	Kjell Storelid	Norway	6:42.68	+7.72	
3rd place, bronze medalist(s)	6	o	Rintje Ritsma	Netherlands	6:43.94	+8.98	
4	3	o	Falko Zandstra	Netherlands	6:44.58	+9.62	
5	5	o	Bart Veldkamp	Netherlands	6:49.00	+14.04	
6	6	i	Toshihiko Itokawa	Japan	6:49.36	+14.40	
7	14	o	Jaromir Radke	Poland	6:50.40	+15.44	
8	12	o	Frank Dittrich	Germany	6:52.27	+17.31	
9	10	i	Michael Hadschieff	Austria	6:53.02	+18.06	
10	12	i	Christian Eminger	Austria	6:53.18	+18.22	
11	9	o	Andrey Anufriyenko	Russia	6:53.23	+18.27	
12	1	o	Jonas Schön	Sweden	6:53.39	+18.43	
13	9	i	Kazuhiro Sato	Japan	6:54.83	+19.87	
14	11	o	Per Bengtsson	Sweden	6:57.37	+22.41	
15	4	i	Roberto Sighel	Italy	6:57.70	+22.74	
16	11	o	Radik Bikchentayev	Kazakhstan	6:58.17	+23.21	
17	15	i	Neal Marshall	Canada	6:58.44	+23.48	
18	13	i	Paweł Zygmunt	Poland	6:58.91	+23.95	
19	5	i	Yevgeny Sanarov	Kazakhstan	6:59.02	+24.06	
20	2	o	Dezideriu Horvath	Romania	6:59.04	+24.08	
21	1	i	Yuriy Shulha	Ukraine	6:59.32	+24.36	
22	10	o	Mike Hall	Canada	6:59.58	+24.62	
23	16	i	Alexander Baumgärtel	Germany	6:59.64	+24.68	
24	8	i	Toru Aoyanagi	Japan	6:59.88	+24.92	
25	7	i	Danny Kah	Australia	7:00.02	+25.06	
26	3	i	Atle Vårvik	Norway	7:00.83	+25.87	
27	14	i	Vadim Sayutin	Kazakhstan	7:01.93	+26.97	
28	7	o	Martin Feigenwinter	Switzerland	7:02.12	+27.16	
29	15	i	Thomas Kumm	Germany	7:02.18	+27.22	
30	8	o	Brian Wanek	United States	7:05.95	+30.99	
31	16	i	Oleg Pavlov	Russia	7:07.09	+32.13	
32	13	o	Vitaly Novichenko	Belarus	7:17.55	+42.59	
