= Speed skating at the 1994 Winter Olympics – Men's 1500 metres =

Speed skating at the Olympics

Men's 1500 metres at the XVII Olympic Winter Games
- Venue: Hamar Olympic Hall
- Dates: 16 February 1994
- Competitors: 44 from 17 nations
- Winning time: 1:51.29 WR

Medalists
1st place, gold medalist(s)		Johann Olav Koss; Norway
2nd place, silver medalist(s)		Rintje Ritsma; Netherlands
3rd place, bronze medalist(s)		Falko Zandstra; Netherlands

The men's 1500 metres in speed skating at the 1994 Winter Olympics took place on 16 February, at the Hamar Olympic Hall. 44 competitors from 17 nations participated in the competition.

== Records ==
Prior to this competition, the existing world and Olympic records were as follows:

World record	Rintje Ritsma (NED)	1:51.60	Heerenveen, Netherlands	8 January 1994
Olympic record	André Hoffmann (GDR)	1:52.06	Calgary, Canada	20 February 1988

The following new world record was set during this competition.

Date	Pair	Athlete	Country	Time	OR	WR
16 February	Pair 2	Johann Olav Koss	Norway	1:51.29	OR	WR

== Results ==
Rank	Pair	Lane	Name	Country	Time	Time behind	Notes
1st place, gold medalist(s)	2	O	Johann Olav Koss	Norway	1:51.29	-	WR
2nd place, silver medalist(s)	6	I	Rintje Ritsma	Netherlands	1:51.99	+0.70	
3rd place, bronze medalist(s)	5	O	Falko Zandstra	Netherlands	1:52.38	+1.09	
4	4	I	Ådne Søndrål	Norway	1:53.13	+1.84	
5	11	O	Andrey Anufriyenko	Russia	1:53.16	+1.87	
6	8	I	Peter Adeberg	Germany	1:53.50	+2.21	
7	4	O	Neal Marshall	Canada	1:53.56	+2.27	
8	1	O	Martin Hersman	Netherlands	1:53.59	+2.30	
9	19	O	Jeroen Straathof	Netherlands	1:53.70	+2.41	
10	3	O	Yuriy Shulha	Ukraine	1:54.28	+2.99	
11	12	O	Paweł Jaroszek	Poland	1:54.49	+3.20	
12	3	I	Roberto Sighel	Italy	1:54.51	+3.22	
13	10	I	Olaf Zinke	Germany	1:54.66	+3.37	
14	15	I	Kjell Storelid	Norway	1:54.69	+3.40	
15	1	I	Toru Aoyanagi	Japan	1:54.85	+3.56	
16	15	O	Oleg Pavlov	Russia	1:54.90	+3.61	
17	2	I	Michael Hadschieff	Austria	1:55.09	+3.80	
18	18	O	Steinar Johansen	Norway	1:55.21	+3.92	
19	13	I	Thomas Kumm	Germany	1:55.35	+4.06	
20	20	I	Michael Spielmann	Germany	1:55.36	+4.07	
21	6	I	Yukinori Miyabe	Japan	1:55.56	+4.27	
22	8	O	Roland Brunner	Austria	1:55.78	+4.49	
22	16	O	Dave Tamburrino	United States	1:55.78	+4.49	
24	17	I	Pat Kelly	Canada	1:55.81	+4.52	
25	7	O	Danny Kah	Australia	1:56.04	+4.75	
26	20	O	Zsolt Baló	Romania	1:56.44	+5.15	
27	14	I	Toshihiko Itokawa	Japan	1:56.67	+5.38	
28	18	I	Kevin Scott	Canada	1:56.68	+5.39	
29	5	I	Radik Bikchentayev	Kazakhstan	1:56.73	+5.44	
30	12	I	Vadim Sayutin	Kazakhstan	1:57.03	+5.74	
31	10	O	Dezideriu Horvath	Romania	1:57.07	+5.78	
32	7	I	Brian Wanek	United States	1:57.09	+5.80	
33	21	O	Sergey Tsybenko	Kazakhstan	1:57.43	+6.14	
34	22	O	Davide Carta	Italy	1:57.46	+6.17	
35	17	I	Vitaly Novichenko	Belarus	1:57.50	+6.21	
36	22	I	Phillip Tahmindjis	Australia	1:57.59	+6.30	
37	9	I	Nathaniel Mills	United States	1:58.43	+7.14	
38	21	I	Pat Bouchard	Canada	1:59.83	+8.54	
39	19	I	K. C. Boutiette	United States	2:00.59	+9.30	
40	9	O	Paweł Zygmunt	Poland	2:05.21	+13.92	
41	16	I	Lee Jae-Sik	South Korea	2:20.60	+29.31	Fall
-	11	I	Alessandro De Taddei	Italy	DNF		
-	13	O	Liu Yanfei	China	DNF		
-	14	O	Artur Szafrański	Poland	DNF		
