= Norway at the 1994 Winter Olympics =

- IOC code: NOR
- NOC: Norwegian Olympic Committee

in Lillehammer
- Competitors: 88 (67 men, 21 women) in 10 sports
- Flag bearer: Bjørn Dæhlie (cross-country skiing)
- Medals Ranked 2nd: Gold 10 Silver 11 Bronze 5 Total 26

Winter Olympics appearances (overview)
- 1924; 1928; 1932; 1936; 1948; 1952; 1956; 1960; 1964; 1968; 1972; 1976; 1980; 1984; 1988; 1992; 1994; 1998; 2002; 2006; 2010; 2014; 2018; 2022; 2026

Norway was the host nation for the 1994 Winter Olympics in Lillehammer. It was the second time that Norway had hosted the Winter Olympic Games, after the 1952 Games in Oslo. In 1994, Norway finished second in the medal ranking to Russia, with strong results in the skiing events.

During the games, Norway set a record: most gold medals won by a host nation, with 10. The United States tied it when they hosted the 2002 Winter Olympics in Salt Lake City, but Canada broke it during the 2010 Winter Olympics in Vancouver.

== Withdrawn from Figure Skating and Bobsleigh ==
As the host country, Norway automatically qualified spots to the 1994 Olympics. In 1992, however, the Norwegian Olympic Committee announced that skaters aspiring to be selected for Norway would have to finish in the top 12 at the European or World Championships. Since none met this requirement, Norway withdrew from all the events. Although Leslie Monod / Cédric Monod's result at the 1993 World Championships allowed Switzerland to send two pairs to the Olympics, the Swiss Olympic Association elected not to send a pair after the Monods finished 11th at the 1994 European Championships.

== Medalists ==
| Medal | Name | Sport | Event | Date |
|---|---|---|---|---|
| Gold | Johann Olav Koss | Speed skating | Men's 5000 metres | 13 February |
| Gold | Thomas Alsgaard | Cross-country skiing | Men's 30 kilometre freestyle | 14 February |
| Gold | Stine Lise Hattestad | Freestyle skiing | Women's moguls | 16 February |
| Gold | Johann Olav Koss | Speed skating | Men's 1500 metres | 16 February |
| Gold | Bjørn Dæhlie | Cross-country skiing | Men's 10 kilometre classical | 17 February |
| Gold | Fred Børre Lundberg | Nordic combined | Individual | 19 February |
| Gold | Bjørn Dæhlie | Cross-country skiing | Men's 15 kilometre freestyle pursuit | 19 February |
| Gold | Johann Olav Koss | Speed skating | Men's 10,000 metres | 20 February |
| Gold | Lasse Kjus | Alpine skiing | Men's combined | 25 February |
| Gold | Espen Bredesen | Ski jumping | Normal hill individual | 25 February |
| Silver | Kjetil André Aamodt | Alpine skiing | Men's downhill | 13 February |
| Silver | Kjell Storelid | Speed skating | Men's 5000 metres | 13 February |
| Silver | Bjørn Dæhlie | Cross-country skiing | Men's 30 kilometre freestyle | 14 February |
| Silver | Espen Bredesen | Ski jumping | Large hill individual | 20 February |
| Silver | Kjell Storelid | Speed skating | Men's 10,000 metres | 20 February |
| Silver | Trude Dybendahl; Inger Helene Nybråten; Elin Nilsen; Anita Moen | Cross-country skiing | Women's 4 × 5 kilometre relay | 21 February |
| Silver | Sture Sivertsen; Vegard Ulvang; Thomas Alsgaard; Bjørn Dæhlie | Cross-country skiing | Men's 4 × 10 kilometre relay | 22 February |
| Silver | Knut Tore Apeland; Bjarte Engen Vik; Fred Børre Lundberg | Nordic combined | Team | 24 February |
| Silver | Marit Wold | Cross-country skiing | Women's 30 kilometre classical | 24 February |
| Silver | Kjetil André Aamodt | Alpine skiing | Men's combined | 25 February |
| Silver | Lasse Ottesen | Ski jumping | Normal hill individual | 25 February |
| Bronze | Kjetil André Aamodt | Alpine skiing | Men's super-G | 17 February |
| Bronze | Bjarte Engen Vik | Nordic combined | Individual | 19 February |
| Bronze | Hilde Synnøve Lid | Freestyle skiing | Women's aerials | 24 February |
| Bronze | Harald-Christian Strand Nilsen | Alpine skiing | Men's combined | 25 February |
| Bronze | Sture Sivertsen | Cross-country skiing | Men's 50 kilometre classical | 27 February |

== Competitors ==
The following is the list of number of competitors in the Games.

| Sport | Men | Women | Total |
|---|---|---|---|
| Alpine skiing | 7 | 5 | 12 |
| Biathlon | 5 | 6 | 11 |
| Cross-country skiing | 7 | 6 | 13 |
| Freestyle skiing | 2 | 2 | 4 |
| Ice hockey | 22 | – | 22 |
| Luge | 2 | 1 | 3 |
| Nordic combined | 4 | – | 4 |
| Short track speed skating | 5 | 0 | 5 |
| Ski jumping | 6 | – | 6 |
| Speed skating | 7 | 1 | 8 |
| Total | 67 | 21 | 88 |

== Alpine skiing ==
Men

| Athlete | Event | Race 1 | Race 2 | Total | |
| Athlete | Event | Time | Time | Time | Rank |
|---|---|---|---|---|---|
| Lasse Kjus | Downhill | | | 1:46.84 | 18 |
| Jan Einar Thorsen | Downhill | | | 1:46.34 | 10 |
| Atle Skårdal | Downhill | | | 1:46.29 | 9 |
| Kjetil André Aamodt | Downhill | | | 1:45.79 | 2nd place, silver medalist(s) |
| Lasse Kjus | Super-G | | | 1:34.02 | 12 |
| Jan Einar Thorsen | Super-G | | | 1:33.37 | 7 |
| Atle Skårdal | Super-G | | | 1:33.31 | 6 |
| Kjetil André Aamodt | Super-G | | | 1:32.93 | 3rd place, bronze medalist(s) |
| Ole Kristian Furuseth | Giant Slalom | DNF | – | DNF | – |
| Kjetil André Aamodt | Giant Slalom | 1:30.03 | 1:23.88 | 2:53.91 | 12 |
| Lasse Kjus | Giant Slalom | 1:29.07 | 1:24.16 | 2:53.23 | 7 |
| Jan Einar Thorsen | Giant Slalom | 1:28.78 | 1:23.93 | 2:52.71 | 4 |
| Ole Kristian Furuseth | Slalom | DSQ | – | DSQ | – |
| Lasse Kjus | Slalom | DNF | – | DNF | – |
| Finn Christian Jagge | Slalom | 1:02.16 | 1:01.03 | 2:03.19 | 6 |
| Kjetil André Aamodt | Slalom | 1:01.80 | DNF | DNF | – |

Men's combined

| Athlete | Downhill | Slalom | | Total | |
| Athlete | Time | Time 1 | Time 2 | Total time | Rank |
|---|---|---|---|---|---|
| Harald Christian Strand Nilsen | 1:39.05 | 51.59 | 48.50 | 3:19.14 | 3rd place, bronze medalist(s) |
| Atle Skårdal | 1:38.18 | 54.29 | 51.81 | 3:24.28 | 18 |
| Kjetil André Aamodt | 1:37.49 | 51.77 | 49.29 | 3:18.55 | 2nd place, silver medalist(s) |
| Lasse Kjus | 1:36.95 | 51.25 | 49.33 | 3:17.53 | 1st place, gold medalist(s) |

Women

| Athlete | Event | Race 1 | Race 2 | Total | |
| Athlete | Event | Time | Time | Time | Rank |
|---|---|---|---|---|---|
| Jeanette Lunde | Downhill | | | 1:37.80 | 11 |
| Caroline Gedde-Dahl | Super-G | | | 1:26.13 | 35 |
| Jeanette Lunde | Super-G | | | 1:25.32 | 32 |
| Marianne Kjørstad | Super-G | | | 1:23.83 | 22 |
| Trine Bakke | Giant Slalom | 1:23.63 | 1:13.55 | 2:37.18 | 19 |
| Caroline Gedde-Dahl | Giant Slalom | 1:23.42 | DNF | DNF | – |
| Marianne Kjørstad | Giant Slalom | 1:21.81 | 1:12.98 | 2:34.79 | 8 |
| Caroline Gedde-Dahl | Slalom | DSQ | – | DSQ | – |
| Trine Bakke | Slalom | DSQ | – | DSQ | – |
| Marianne Kjørstad | Slalom | DNF | – | DNF | – |
| Trude Gimle | Slalom | 1:01.55 | 58.32 | 1:59.87 | 15 |

Women's combined

| Athlete | Downhill | Slalom | | Total | |
| Athlete | Time | Time 1 | Time 2 | Total time | Rank |
|---|---|---|---|---|---|
| Jeanette Lunde | 1:29.31 | 55.11 | 51.55 | 3:15.97 | 15 |

== Biathlon ==
Men

| Event | Athlete | Misses ^{1} | Time | Rank |
|---|---|---|---|---|
| 10 km Sprint | Sylfest Glimsdal | 3 | 32:07.4 | 53 |
| 10 km Sprint | Ole Einar Bjørndalen | 1 | 30:44.6 | 28 |
| 10 km Sprint | Jon Åge Tyldum | 2 | 30:36.7 | 25 |
| 10 km Sprint | Ivar Michal Ulekleiv | 1 | 29:56.6 | 14 |

| Event | Athlete | Time | Misses | Adjusted time ^{2} | Rank |
|---|---|---|---|---|---|
| 20 km | Jon Åge Tyldum | 1'00:31.7 | 3 | 1'03:31.7 | 52 |
| 20 km | Halvard Hanevold | 58:52.0 | 4 | 1'02:52.0 | 46 |
| 20 km | Ole Einar Bjørndalen | 57:51.0 | 4 | 1'01:51.0 | 36 |
| 20 km | Sylfest Glimsdal | 56:42.4 | 3 | 59:42.4 | 9 |

Men's 4 × 7.5 km relay

| Athletes | Race | | |
| Athletes | Misses ^{1} | Time | Rank |
|---|---|---|---|
| Ole Einar Bjørndalen; Ivar Michal Ulekleiv; Halvard Hanevold; Jon Åge Tyldum | 0 | 1'33:32.8 | 7 |

Women

| Event | Athlete | Misses ^{1} | Time | Rank |
|---|---|---|---|---|
| 7.5 km Sprint | Hildegunn Fossen | 4 | 29:16.2 | 47 |
| 7.5 km Sprint | Annette Sikveland | 2 | 27:32.8 | 22 |
| 7.5 km Sprint | Ann Elen Skjelbreid | 1 | 27:17.7 | 17 |
| 7.5 km Sprint | Elin Kristiansen | 0 | 26:53.5 | 10 |

| Event | Athlete | Time | Misses | Adjusted time ^{2} | Rank |
|---|---|---|---|---|---|
| 15 km | Anne Elvebakk | 55:29.8 | 5 | 1'00:29.8 | 59 |
| 15 km | Gunn Margit Andreassen | 56:02.7 | 3 | 59:02.7 | 43 |
| 15 km | Elin Kristiansen | 54:04.2 | 3 | 57:04.2 | 31 |
| 15 km | Hildegunn Fossen | 52:55.4 | 3 | 55:55.4 | 21 |

Women's 4 × 7.5 km relay

| Athletes | Race | | |
| Athletes | Misses ^{1} | Time | Rank |
|---|---|---|---|
| Ann Elen Skjelbreid; Annette Sikveland; Hildegunn Fossen; Elin Kristiansen | 2 | 1'54:08.1 | 4 |

^{1} A penalty loop of 150 metres had to be skied per missed target.
^{2} One minute added per missed target.

== Cross-country skiing ==
Men

| Event | Athlete | Race | |
| Event | Athlete | Time | Rank |
|---|---|---|---|
| 10 km C | Thomas Alsgaard | 26:07.0 | 24 |
| 10 km C | Vegard Ulvang | 25:08.0 | 7 |
| 10 km C | Sture Sivertsen | 24:59.7 | 5 |
| 10 km C | Bjørn Dæhlie | 24:20.1 | 1st place, gold medalist(s) |
| 15 km pursuit^{1} F | Sture Sivertsen | 37:49.7 | 7 |
| 15 km pursuit^{1} F | Bjørn Dæhlie | 35:48.8 | 1st place, gold medalist(s) |
| 30 km F | Kristen Skjeldal | 1'17:48.3 | 18 |
| 30 km F | Egil Kristiansen | 1'15:37.7 | 8 |
| 30 km F | Bjørn Dæhlie | 1'13:13.6 | 2nd place, silver medalist(s) |
| 30 km F | Thomas Alsgaard | 1'12:26.4 | 1st place, gold medalist(s) |
| 50 km C | Vegard Ulvang | 2'10:40.0 | 10 |
| 50 km C | Erling Jevne | 2'09:12.2 | 5 |
| 50 km C | Bjørn Dæhlie | 2'09:11.4 | 4 |
| 50 km C | Sture Sivertsen | 2'08:49.0 | 3rd place, bronze medalist(s) |

^{1} Starting delay based on 10 km results.
C = Classical style, F = Freestyle

Men's 4 × 10 km relay

| Athletes | Race | |
| Athletes | Time | Rank |
|---|---|---|
| Sture Sivertsen; Vegard Ulvang; Thomas Alsgaard; Bjørn Dæhlie | 1'41:15.4 | 2nd place, silver medalist(s) |

Women

| Event | Athlete | Race | |
| Event | Athlete | Time | Rank |
|---|---|---|---|
| 5 km C | Elin Nilsen | 15:03.1 | 12 |
| 5 km C | Trude Dybendahl | 14:48.1 | 7 |
| 5 km C | Inger Helene Nybråten | 14:43.6 | 5 |
| 5 km C | Anita Moen | 14:39.4 | 4 |
| 10 km pursuit^{2} F | Elin Nilsen | 29:35.4 | 12 |
| 10 km pursuit^{2} F | Anita Moen | 29:13.2 | 8 |
| 10 km pursuit^{2} F | Trude Dybendahl | 28:42.2 | 7 |
| 15 km F | Bente Martinsen | 44:35.0 | 20 |
| 15 km F | Marit Wold | 43:25.1 | 14 |
| 15 km F | Elin Nilsen | 43:19.8 | 13 |
| 15 km F | Anita Moen | 42:42.9 | 10 |
| 30 km C | Anita Moen | 1'28:18.1 | 10 |
| 30 km C | Inger Helene Nybråten | 1'27:11.2 | 7 |
| 30 km C | Trude Dybendahl | 1'26:52.6 | 4 |
| 30 km C | Marit Wold | 1'25:57.8 | 2nd place, silver medalist(s) |

^{2} Starting delay based on 5 km results.
C = Classical style, F = Freestyle

Women's 4 × 5 km relay

| Athletes | Race | |
| Athletes | Time | Rank |
|---|---|---|
| Trude Dybendahl; Inger Helene Nybråten; Elin Nilsen; Anita Moen | 57:42.6 | 2nd place, silver medalist(s) |

== Freestyle skiing ==
Men

| Athlete | Event | Qualification | | | Final | | |
| Athlete | Event | Time | Points | Rank | Time | Points | Rank |
|---|---|---|---|---|---|---|---|
| Hans Engelsen Eide | Moguls | 23.84 | 25.06 | 8 Q | 23.86 | 23.32 | 15 |
| Tor Skeie | Aerials | | 172.77 | 15 | did not advance | | |

Women

| Athlete | Event | Qualification | | | Final | | |
| Athlete | Event | Time | Points | Rank | Time | Points | Rank |
|---|---|---|---|---|---|---|---|
| Stine Lise Hattestad | Moguls | 31.83 | 24.91 | 2 Q | 29.51 | 25.97 | 1st place, gold medalist(s) |
| Hilde Synnøve Lid | Aerials | | 158.70 | 2 Q | | 164.13 | 3rd place, bronze medalist(s) |

== Ice hockey ==
=== Group A ===
Twelve participating teams were placed in the two groups. After playing a round-robin, the top four teams in each group advanced to the Medal Round while the last two teams competed in the consolation round for the 9th to 12th places.

| Team advanced to the Final Round |
| Team sent to compete in the consolation round |

| Team | GP | W | L | T | GF | GA | PTS |
|---|---|---|---|---|---|---|---|
| Finland | 5 | 5 | 0 | 0 | 25 | 4 | 10 |
| Germany | 5 | 3 | 2 | 0 | 11 | 14 | 6 |
| Czech Republic | 5 | 3 | 2 | 0 | 16 | 11 | 6 |
| Russia | 5 | 3 | 2 | 0 | 20 | 14 | 6 |
| Austria | 5 | 1 | 4 | 0 | 13 | 28 | 2 |
| Norway | 5 | 0 | 5 | 0 | 5 | 19 | 0 |

| Norway | 1:5 | Russia |
| Norway | 1:2 | Germany |
| Norway | 0:4 | Finland |
| Norway | 1:4 | Czech Republic |
| Norway | 2:4 | Austria |

=== consolation round ===
| Team 1 | Score | Team 2 |
|---|---|---|
| Norway | 3–6 | Italy |

11th place match

| Team 1 | Score | Team 2 |
|---|---|---|
| Norway | 3–1 | Austria |

- Team roster

- Jim Marthinsen (G)
- Rob Schistad (G)
- Petter Salsten (D)
- Morgan Andersen (D)
- Tommy Jakobsen (D)
- Jan-Roar Fagerli (D)
- Svein Enok Nørstebø (D)
- Svenn Erik Bjørnstad (D)
- Geir Hoff (F)
- Vegar Barlie (F)
- Lars Håkon Andersen (F)
- Ole Eskild Dahlstrøm (F)
- Arne Billkvam (F)
- Erik Kristiansen (F)
- Trond Magnussen (F)
- Petter Thoresen (F)
- Morten Finstad (F)
- Roy Johansen (F)
- Tom Johansen (F)
- Marius Rath (F)
- Espen Knutsen (F)

Head coach: Bengt Ohlson

== Luge ==
(Men's) Doubles

| Athletes | Run 1 | | Run 2 | | Total | |
| Athletes | Time | Rank | Time | Rank | Time | Rank |
|---|---|---|---|---|---|---|
| Harald Rolfsen; Lars-Marius Waldal | DSQ | – | – | – | DSQ | – |

Women

| Athlete | Run 1 | | Run 2 | | Run 3 | | Run 4 | | Total | |
| Athlete | Time | Rank | Time | Rank | Time | Rank | Time | Rank | Time | Rank |
|---|---|---|---|---|---|---|---|---|---|---|
| Pia Wedege | 49.367 | 12 | 49.490 | 10 | 49.720 | 17 | 49.470 | 13 | 3:18.047 | 13 |

== Nordic combined ==
Men's individual

Events:

- normal hill ski jumping
- 15 km cross-country skiing (Start delay, based on ski jumping results.)

| Athlete | Event | Ski Jumping | | Cross-country time | Total rank |
| Athlete | Event | Points | Rank | Cross-country time | Total rank |
|---|---|---|---|---|---|
| Trond Einar Elden | Individual | 201.5 | 17 | 43:10.7 | 8 |
| Knut Tore Apeland | Individual | 204.5 | 15 | 43:59.6 | 11 |
| Bjarte Engen Vik | Individual | 240.5 | 3 | 40:26.2 | 3rd place, bronze medalist(s) |
| Fred Børre Lundberg | Individual | 247.0 | 1 | 39:07.9 | 1st place, gold medalist(s) |

Men's Team

Three participants per team.

Events:

- normal hill ski jumping
- 10 km cross-country skiing (Start delay, based on ski jumping results.)

| Athletes | Ski jumping | | Cross-country time | Total rank |
| Athletes | Points | Rank | Cross-country time | Total rank |
|---|---|---|---|---|
| Bjarte Engen Vik; Knut Tore Apeland; Fred Børre Lundberg | 672.0 | 2 | 1'27:40.9 | 2nd place, silver medalist(s) |

== Short track speed skating ==
Men

| Athlete | Event | Round one | | Quarter finals | | Semi finals | | Finals | |
| Athlete | Event | Time | Rank | Time | Rank | Time | Rank | Time | Final rank |
|---|---|---|---|---|---|---|---|---|---|
| Bjørnar Elgetun | 500 m | 44.01 | 1 Q | 45.35 | 3 | did not advance | | | |
| Bjørnar Elgetun | 1000 m | 1:32.35 | 2 Q | 1:30.96 | 3 | did not advance | | | |
| Bjørnar Elgetun; Gisle Elvebakken; Tore Klevstuen; Morten Staubo; Øystein Carlsen | 5000 m relay | | | | | 7:25.73 | 4 QB | 7:24.29 | 6 |

== Ski jumping ==
| Athlete | Event | Jump 1 | | Jump 2 | | Total | |
| Athlete | Event | Distance | Points | Distance | Points | Points | Rank |
|---|---|---|---|---|---|---|---|
| Bjørn Myrbakken | Normal hill | 87.0 | 106.5 | 84.5 | 71.0 | 177.5 | 39 |
| Øyvind Berg | Normal hill | 89.0 | 112.5 | 59.0 | 37.0 | 149.5 | 52 |
| Lasse Ottesen | Normal hill | 102.5 | 137.5 | 98.0 | 130.5 | 268.0 | 2nd place, silver medalist(s) |
| Espen Bredesen | Normal hill | 100.5 | 140.5 | 104.0 | 141.5 | 282.0 | 1st place, gold medalist(s) |
| Stein Henrik Tuff | Large hill | 87.0 | 51.1 | 90.5 | 59.4 | 110.5 | 43 |
| Øyvind Berg | Large hill | 112.0 | 99.6 | 105.5 | 87.4 | 187.0 | 17 |
| Lasse Ottesen | Large hill | 117.0 | 109.6 | 120.0 | 117.0 | 226.6 | 6 |
| Espen Bredesen | Large hill | 135.5 | 144.4 | 122.0 | 122.1 | 266.5 | 2nd place, silver medalist(s) |

Men's team large hill

| Athletes | Result | |
| Athletes | Points ^{1} | Rank |
|---|---|---|
| Espen Bredesen; Lasse Ottesen; Øyvind Berg; Roar Ljøkelsøy | 898.8 | 4 |

^{1} Four teams members performed two jumps each.

== Speed skating ==
Men

| Event | Athlete | Race | |
| Event | Athlete | Time | Rank |
|---|---|---|---|
| 500 m | Roger Strøm | DNF | – |
| 500 m | Grunde Njøs | 36.66 | 7 |
| 1000 m | Ådne Søndrål | DSQ | – |
| 1000 m | Grunde Njøs | DNF | – |
| 1000 m | Roger Strøm | 1:13.74 | 7 |
| 1500 m | Steinar Johansen | 1:55.21 | 18 |
| 1500 m | Kjell Storelid | 1:54.69 | 14 |
| 1500 m | Ådne Søndrål | 1:53.13 | 4 |
| 1500 m | Johann Olav Koss | 1:51.29 OR | 1st place, gold medalist(s) |
| 5000 m | Atle Vårvik | 7:00.83 | 26 |
| 5000 m | Kjell Storelid | 6:42.68 | 2nd place, silver medalist(s) |
| 5000 m | Johann Olav Koss | 6:34.96 OR | 1st place, gold medalist(s) |
| 10,000 m | Kjell Storelid | 13:49.25 | 2nd place, silver medalist(s) |
| 10,000 m | Johann Olav Koss | 13:30.55 WR | 1st place, gold medalist(s) |

Women

| Event | Athlete | Race | |
| Event | Athlete | Time | Rank |
|---|---|---|---|
| 500 m | Edel Therese Høiseth | 40.20 | 8 |
| 1000 m | Edel Therese Høiseth | 1:22.98 | 26 |
