= Speed skating at the 1994 Winter Olympics – Men's 10,000 metres =

Speed skating at the Olympics

Men's 10,000 metres at the XVII Olympic Winter Games
- Venue: Hamar Olympic Hall
- Dates: 20 February 1994
- Competitors: 16 from 10 nations
- Winning time: 13:30.55 WR

Medalists
1st place, gold medalist(s)		Johann Olav Koss; Norway
2nd place, silver medalist(s)		Kjell Storelid; Norway
3rd place, bronze medalist(s)		Bart Veldkamp; Netherlands

The men's 10,000 metres in speed skating at the 1994 Winter Olympics took place on 20 February, at the Hamar Olympic Hall. 16 competitors from 10 nations participated in the event.

== Records ==
Prior to this competition, the existing world and Olympic records were as follows:

World record	Johann Olav Koss (NOR)	13:43.54	Heerenveen, Netherlands	10 February 1991
Olympic record	Tomas Gustafson (SWE)	13:48.20	Calgary, Canada	21 February 1988

The following new world record was set during this competition.

Date	Pair	Athlete	Country	Time	OR	WR
20 February	Pair 5	Johann Olav Koss	Norway	13:30.55	OR	WR

== Results ==
Rank	Pair	Lane	Athlete	Country	Time	Time Behind	Notes
1st place, gold medalist(s)	5	i	Johann Olav Koss	Norway	13:30.55	-	(WR)
2nd place, silver medalist(s)	8	i	Kjell Storelid	Norway	13:49.25	+18.70	
3rd place, bronze medalist(s)	6	i	Bart Veldkamp	Netherlands	13:56.73	+26.18	
4	7	i	Falko Zandstra	Netherlands	13:58.25	+27.70	
5	6	o	Jaromir Radke	Poland	14:03.84	+33.29	
6	5	o	Frank Dittrich	Germany	14:04.33	+33.78	
7	8	o	Rintje Ritsma	Netherlands	14:09.28	+38.70	
8	4	i	Jonas Schön	Sweden	14:10.15	+39.60	
9	1	i	Michael Hadschieff	Austria	14:12.09	+41.54	
10	2	o	Christian Eminger	Austria	14:15.14	+44.59	
11	7	o	Toshihiko Itokawa	Japan	14:17.00	+46.45	
12	3	i	Andrey Anufriyenko	Russia	14:18.42	+47.87	
13	4	o	Kazuhiro Sato	Japan	14:18.44	+47.89	
14	1	o	Yevgeny Sanarov	Kazakhstan	14:21.12	+50.57	
15	2	i	Roberto Sighel	Italy	14:27.59	+57.04	
16	3	o	Per Bengtsson	Sweden	14:48.00	+1:17.45	
