= Netherlands at the 1994 Winter Olympics =

- Flag of the Netherlands
- IOC code: NED
- NOC: Dutch Olympic Committee*; Dutch Sports Federation
- Website: www.nocnsf.nl (in Dutch)

in Lillehammer
- Competitors: 21 (13 men, 8 women) in 4 sports
- Flag bearer: Christine Aaftink (speedskating)
- Medals Ranked 18th: Gold 0 Silver 1 Bronze 3 Total 4

Winter Olympics appearances (overview)
- 1928; 1932; 1936; 1948; 1952; 1956; 1960; 1964; 1968; 1972; 1976; 1980; 1984; 1988; 1992; 1994; 1998; 2002; 2006; 2010; 2014; 2018; 2022; 2026; 2030

Athletes from the Netherlands competed at the 1994 Winter Olympics in Lillehammer, Norway.

== Medalists ==
Medal	Name	Sport	Event	Date
Silver	Rintje Ritsma	Speed skating	Men's 1500 metres	16 February
Bronze	Rintje Ritsma	Speed skating	Men's 5000 metres	13 February
Bronze	Falko Zandstra	Speed skating	Men's 1500 metres	16 February
Bronze	Bart Veldkamp	Speed skating	Men's 10,000 metres	20 February

== Competitors ==
The following is the list of number of competitors in the Games.

Sport	Men	Women	Total
Bobsleigh	2	–	2
Freestyle skiing	1	0	1
Short track speed skating	1	4	5
Speed skating	9	4	13
Total	13	8	21

== Bobsleigh ==
Men

Event	Athlete	Run 1		Run 2		Run 3		Run 4		Total	
Event	Athlete	Time	Rank	Time	Rank	Time	Rank	Time	Rank	Time	Rank
Two-man	Rob Geurts; Robert de Wit	53.52	23	53.90	26	53.76	24	53.89	23	3:35.07	24

== Freestyle skiing ==
Athlete	Event	Qualifying		Final	
Athlete	Event	Points	Rank	Points	Rank
Michiel de Ruiter	Aerials	168.39	17	Did not advance	

== Short track speed skating ==
Men

Event	Athlete	Heat		Quarterfinal		Semifinal		Final	
Event	Athlete	Time	Position	Time	Position	Time	Position	Time	Position
500 m	Erik Duyvelshoff	45.83	3	Did not advance					
1000 m	Erik Duyvelshoff	1:34.37	3	Did not advance					

Women

Event	Athlete	Heat		Quarterfinal		Semifinal		Final	
Event	Athlete	Time	Position	Time	Position	Time	Position	Time	Position
500 m	Anke Jannie Landman	48.36	3	Did not advance					
500 m	Penèlope di Lella	48.44	4	Did not advance					
1000 m	Anke Jannie Landman	1:58.09	4	Did not advance					
1000 m	Penèlope di Lella	1:47.54	4	Did not advance					
3000 m relay	Penèlope di Lella; Anke Jannie Landman; Priscilla Ernst; Esmeralda Ossendrijver					4:45.26	3 QB	4:45.40	6

== Speed skating ==
Men

Event	Athlete	Race	
Event	Athlete	Time	Rank
500 m	Arie Loef	37.52	24
500 m	Arjan Schreuder	38.33	37
500 m	Gerard van Velde	37.45	21
500 m	Nico van der Vlies	37.94	31
1000 m	Arie Loef	1:15.12	22
1000 m	Arjan Schreuder	1:15.19	24
1000 m	Gerard van Velde	1:13.81	9
1000 m	Nico van der Vlies	1:14.29	15
1500 m	Martin Hersman	1:53.59	8
1500 m	Rintje Ritsma	1:51.99	2nd place, silver medalist(s)
1500 m	Jeroen Straathof	1:53.70	9
1500 m	Falko Zandstra	1:52.38	3rd place, bronze medalist(s)
5000 m	Rintje Ritsma	6:43.94	3rd place, bronze medalist(s)
5000 m	Bart Veldkamp	6:49.00	5
5000 m	Falko Zandstra	6:44.58	4
10,000 m	Rintje Ritsma	14:09.28	7
10,000 m	Bart Veldkamp	13:56.73	3rd place, bronze medalist(s)
10,000 m	Falko Zandstra	13:58.25	4

Women

Event	Athlete	Race	
Event	Athlete	Time	Rank
500 m	Christine Aaftink	41.01	19
1000 m	Christine Aaftink	1:22.16	20
1000 m	Annamarie Thomas	1:20.94	14
1500 m	Tonny de Jong	2:05.18	10
1500 m	Annamarie Thomas	2:03.70	5
1500 m	Carla Zijlstra	2:08.49	22
3000 m	Tonny de Jong	4:25.88	11
3000 m	Annamarie Thomas	4:19.82	5
3000 m	Carla Zijlstra	4:23.42	9
5000 m	Tonny de Jong	7:36.07	11
5000 m	Annamarie Thomas	7:32.39	10
5000 m	Carla Zijlstra	7:29.42	7
