= List of Olympic medals by host nation =

Tabulated below are the medals and overall rankings for host nations in each Summer Olympics and Winter Olympics, based on individual Games medals tables.

== Summer Olympics ==
Ranked first

Games	Host nation	Gold	Silver	Bronze	Total	Rank
1896	Greece	10	17	19	46	2
1900	France	31	41	40	112	1
1904	United States	80	85	83	248	1
1908	Great Britain	56	51	39	146	1
1912	Sweden	23	25	17	65	2
1920	Belgium	14	11	11	36	5
1924	France	13	15	10	38	3
1928	Netherlands	6	9	4	19	8
1932	United States	44	36	30	110	1
1936	Germany	38	31	32	101	1
1948	Great Britain	3	14	6	23	12
1952	Finland	6	3	13	22	8
1956	Australia	13	8	14	35	3
1960	Italy	13	10	13	36	3
1964	Japan	16	5	8	29	3
1968	Mexico	3	3	3	9	15
1972	West Germany	13	11	16	40	4
1976	Canada	0	5	6	11	27
1980	Soviet Union	80	69	46	195	1
1984	United States	83	61	30	174	1
1988	South Korea	12	10	11	33	4
1992	Spain	13	7	2	22	6
1996	United States	44	32	25	101	1
2000	Australia	16	25	17	58	4
2004	Greece	6	6	4	16	15
2008	China	48	22	30	100	1
2012	Great Britain	29	18	18	65	3
2016	Brazil	7	6	6	19	13
2020	Japan	27	14	17	58	3
2024	France	16	26	22	64	5
2028	United States					
2032	Australia					

== Winter Olympics ==
Ranked first

Games	Host nation	Gold	Silver	Bronze	Total	Rank
1924	France	0	0	3	3	9
1928	Switzerland	0	0	1	1	8
1932	United States	6	4	2	12	1
1936	Germany	3	3	0	6	2
1948	Switzerland	3	4	3	10	3
1952	Norway	7	3	6	16	1
1956	Italy	1	2	0	3	8
1960	United States	3	4	3	10	3
1964	Austria	4	5	3	12	2
1968	France	4	3	2	9	3
1972	Japan	1	1	1	3	11
1976	Austria	2	2	2	6	7
1980	United States	6	4	2	12	3
1984	Yugoslavia	0	1	0	1	14
1988	Canada	0	2	3	5	13
1992	France	3	5	1	9	7
1994	Norway	10	11	5	26	2
1998	Japan	5	1	4	10	7
2002	United States	10	13	11	34	3
2006	Italy	5	0	6	11	9
2010	Canada	14	7	5	26	1
2014	Russia	10	10	9	29	2
2018	South Korea	5	8	4	17	7
2022	China	9	4	2	15	4
2026	Italy	10	6	14	30	4
2030	France					
2034	United States					
