= Vikingskipet =

Indoor arena in Hamar, Norway

Hamar Olympic Hall
- Vikingskipet
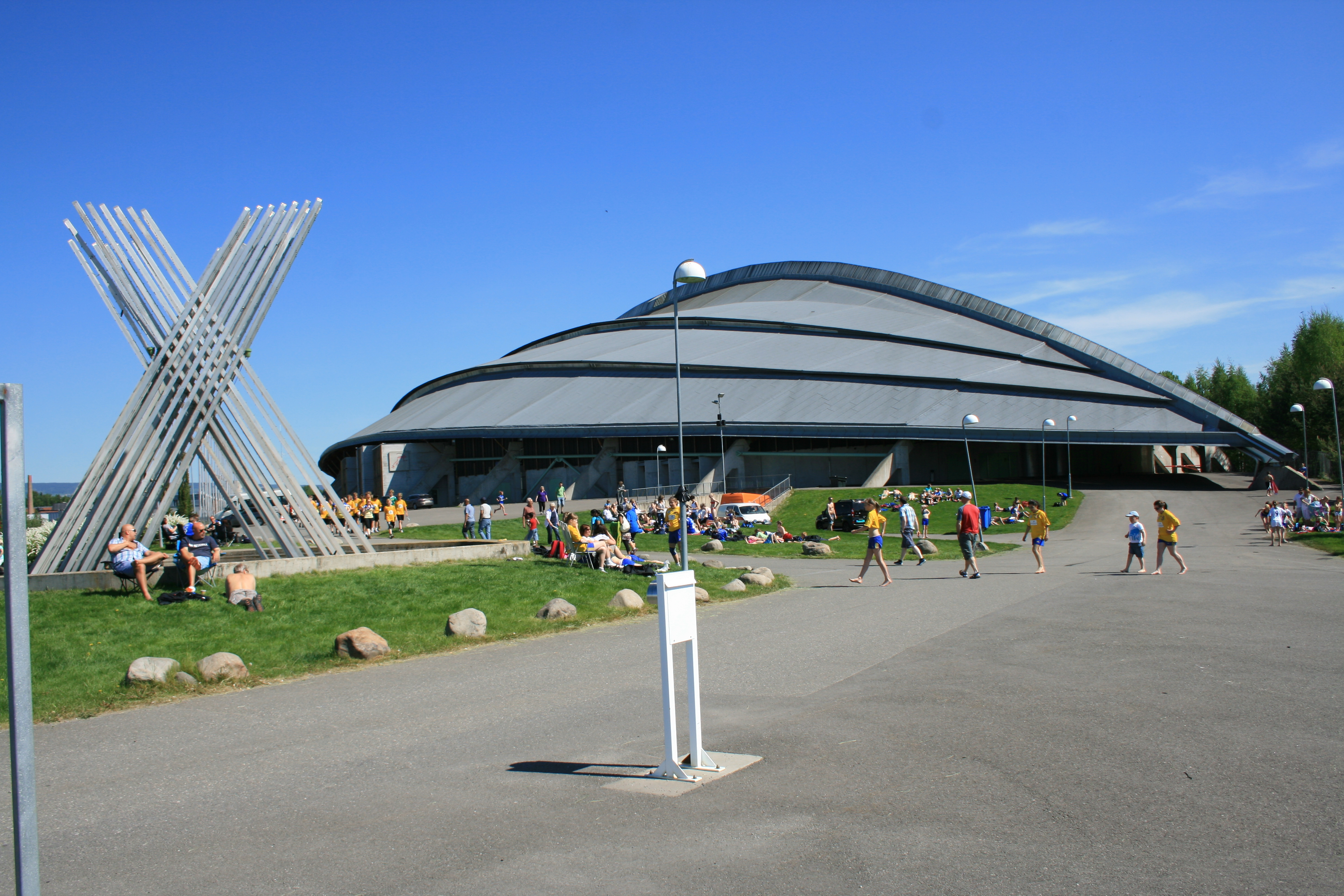
- Interactive map of Hamar Olympic Hall
- Location: Åkersvikvegen 1, NO-2321 Hamar, Norway
- Coordinates: 60°47′35.34″N 11°5′59.25″E
- Owner: Hamar Municipality
- Operator: Hamar Olympiske Anlegg
- Capacity: 10,600 (sporting events); 20,000 (concerts)

Construction
- Groundbreaking: 1990
- Opened: 19 December 1992
- Cost: 230 million kr
- Architects: Niels Torp; Biong & Biong

Tenants
- 1993 Bandy World Championship; World Allround Speed Skating Championships (1993, 1999, 2004, 2009, 2013); 1993 UCI Track Cycling World Championships; 1994 Winter Olympics; 1994 Winter Paralympics; 1996 World Single Distance Speed Skating Championships; World Sprint Speed Skating Championships (1997, 2002, 2007); Speedway Grand Prix (2002–04); 2016 Winter Youth Olympics

Vikingskipet ("The Viking Ship"), officially known as Hamar Olympic Hall (Norwegian: Hamar olympiahall), is an indoor multi-use sport and event venue in Hamar, Norway. It was built as the speed skating rink for the 1994 Winter Olympics, and has since also hosted events and tournaments in ice speedway, motorcycle speedway, rally, association football, bandy, ice sledge speed racing, flying disc and track cycling. The arena is also used for concerts, trade fair and the annual computer party The Gathering. It is the home arena of Hamar IL bandy team. The venue is owned by Hamar Municipality, and along with Hamar Olympic Amphitheatre is run by the municipal Hamar Olympiske Anlegg. Vikingskipet has a capacity for 10,600 spectators during sporting events and 20,000 during concerts.

The arena was designed by Niels Torp, and Biong & Biong, and opened on 19 December 1992. The complex cost 230 million Norwegian krone (NOK). The construction location was controversial, as it is located at Åkervika, a Ramsar site. It is Norway's national venue for speed skating and bandy, and holds annual ISU Speed Skating World Cup races, as well as regular world championships. It has among other things hosted tournaments of the World Allround Speed Skating Championships, European Speed Skating Championships, World Single Distance Championships, World Sprint Speed Skating Championships, UCI Track Cycling World Championships, Speedway Grand Prix and World Rally Championship.

== Construction ==
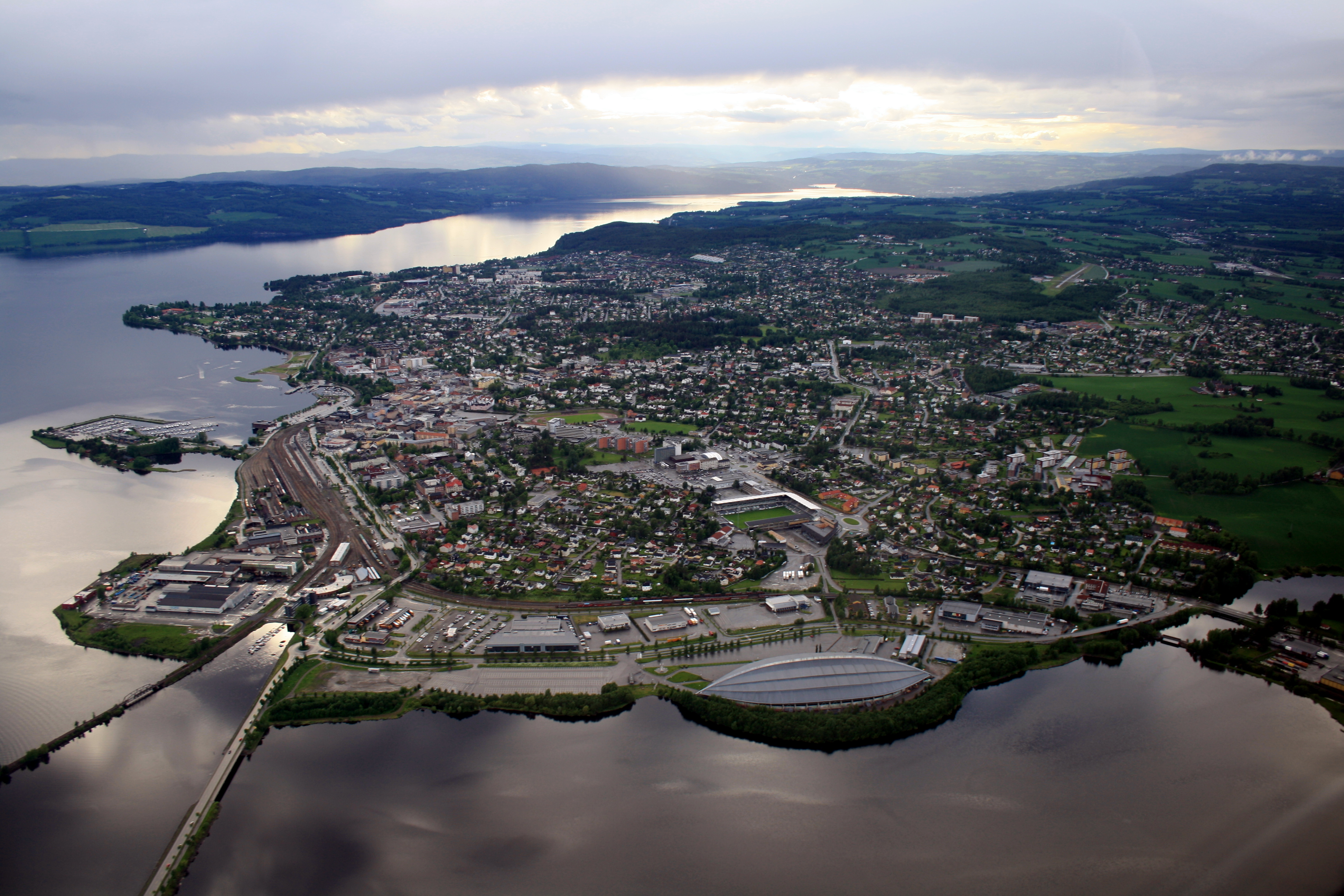
Aerial view of Hamar with Vikingskipet in the foreground

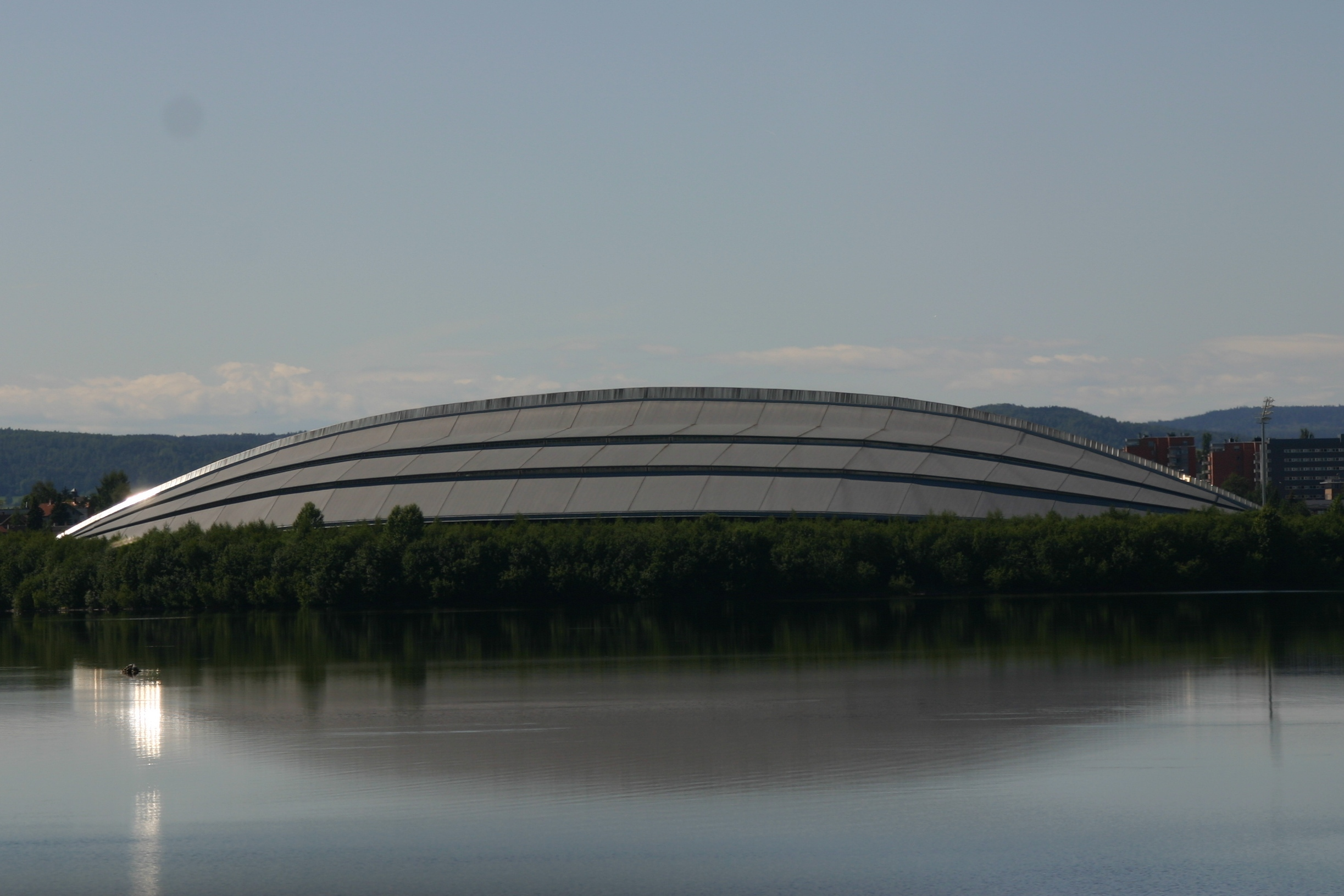
Vikingskipet in profile, as seen from Mjøsa

During the process of the Lillehammer bid for the 1992 Winter Olympics, the International Olympic Committee had not specified that it was necessary with an indoor speed skating rink. Due the interference of winter winds in Calgary had to build the indoor Olympic Oval as the venue for the 1988 Winter Olympics, but Albertville, who were awarded the 1992 Winter Olympics, had opted for the L'anneau de vitesse an outdoor temporary track on a football stadium. In its bid, the speed skating events were planned held at Stampesletta area, on another temporary track. In 1986, ISU decided that the Olympics events could be only held on indoor venues.

Hamar had previously been a venue for international speed skating events at Hamar stadion. The town was therefore selected to host the two skating venues. In December 1989, it was decided that the new venue would be built at Åkervika, a Ramsar site 1 kilometer (0.6 mi) outside downtown Hamar. A compromise was reached whereby the stadium was moved 50 meters (160 ft) from its original location, two birdwatching towers were built, and a lumber yard was moved. Nature and Youth remained opposed to the plans, stating the location "has destroyed part of one of the world's most important bird reserves".

The construction was passed by the Parliament of Norway in April 1990. Architects were Niels Torp, and Biong and Biong. Ole K. Karlsen was selected to build the building, in competition with eleven other contractors. The ventilation contract worth NOK 18 million had originally been awarded to Hagen & Haugan on 29 May 1991. Two days later, the Lillehammer Olympic Organizing Committee (LOOC) signed a sponsorship agreement with Norsk Viftefabrikk and Elektrisk Bureau, both part of Asea Brown Boveri, which demanded discounts in their sponsorship payments for not receiving the contract. In September 1992, Investa, which owned Ole K. Karlsen, filed for bankruptcy, causing delays in construction. When it opened, Vikingskipet was the largest indoor sports venue in the world, and has twice the spectator capacity of the Calgary Olympic Oval. The ice rink was first tested on 15 December 1992, and officially opened on 19 December.

The construction of the venue cost NOK 230 million, which was almost entirely financed through state grants. Hamar Municipality contributed by building a co-located fire station for NOK 21 million. Local businesses also contributed with NOK 8 million. Moelven Industrier and Fireguard both contributed in exchange for being able to use the venues for marketing large wooden structures. To finance the operating deficit after the Olympics, Hamar Municipality received a capital grant of NOK 30 million, with the interest going to pay for running Vikingskipet and Hamar Olympic Amphitheatre. Operating costs were estimated at NOK 7 million per year; the venue will receive income of NOK 1 million from larger events, NOK 1 million will come from free work from the fire department, and NOK 1 million from advertisements. Similar to Hamar Olympic Amphitheatre, the venue has two official names, Hamar Olympic Hall and Vikingskipet. The former cannot be used commercially by non-Olympic events, such as in merchandise.

== Facilities ==
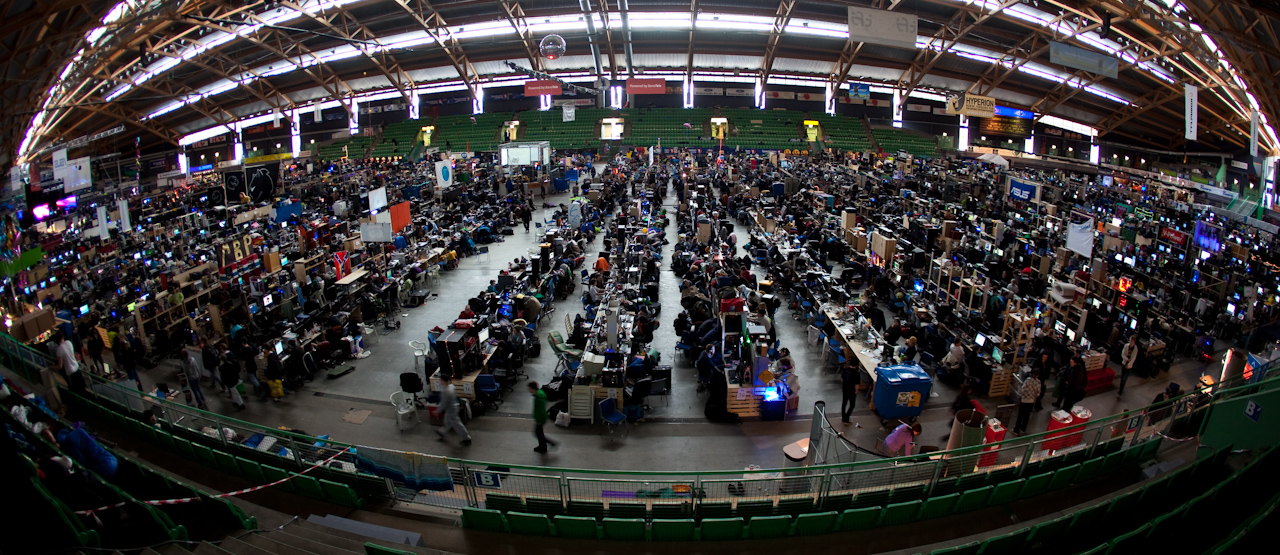
The Gathering during 2009

The venue has a floor area of 25,000 square meters (270,000 sq ft) and a volume of 400,000 cubic meters (14,000,000 cu ft). The hall has a spectator capacity of 10,600 people, of which 2,000 can be seated. During the Olympics, this included 250 VIP seats, 250 press seats and 100 commentator seats. Access to the inner ring can be provided via an underpass. Lighting is provided at 1,400 lux, while the venue has a ventilation system capable of both heating and cooling, as well as de-moisturizing, and both re-use and circulation of air. The refrigeration unit uses an ammonia and saline solution, which is transported in pipes within the concrete, which allows for an ice temperature of between −5.5 and −6.5 degrees Celsius (22 and 20 °F). The heat from the refrigerating unit can be reused.

The rink itself is 400 meters (1,300 ft) long, with a turning radius of 25.5 meters (84 ft). Within the speed skating rink lies a bandy field. The venue was designed to also allow for association football, cycling, track and field, curling, motorsports and cross-country skiing. The inside of the track can also be used for association football, with pitch dimensions up to 105 by 68 meters (344 by 223 ft). It can also function as an indoor driving range for golf. The name derives from the roof looking like the keel of a Viking ship. The building is visible from the E6 motorway and the Dovre Line passing through Hamar, and was planned to be Hamar's main landmark.

== Transport ==
During the Olympics, transport was in part provided by Vikingskipet Station on the Røros Line, which passes right next to the venue. The station is a cul-de-sac station which is electrified and allowed trains during the Olympics and the Track Cycling World Championships to reach the venue within a short walk from the train. The station was officially opened on 16 August 1993. The station has not been used since the Olympics. In 2006, the Norwegian National Rail Administration proposed re-opening the station in conjunction with larger events.

== Events ==
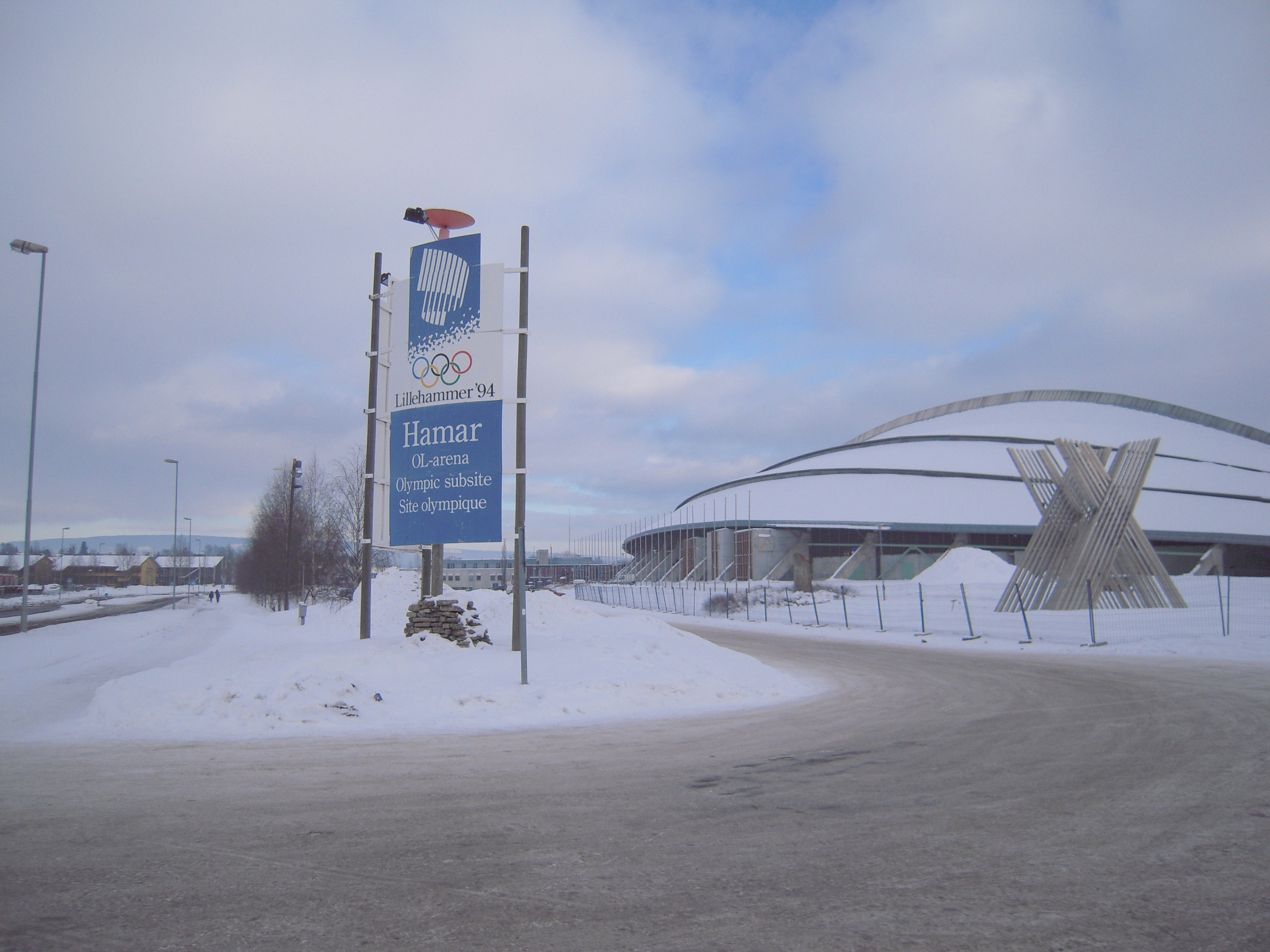
Sign informing about it being an Olympic venue

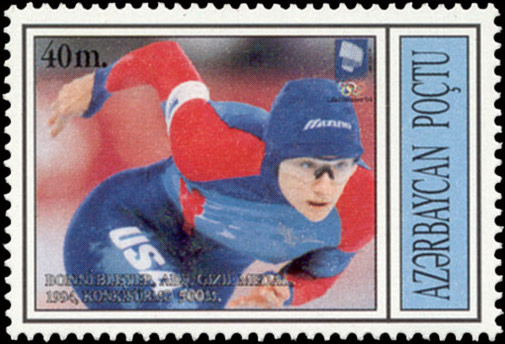
Azerbaijan stamp depicting Bonnie Blair during the 1994 Winter Olympics

Prior to the Olympic Games, the venue hosted three world championships in 1993. In February, it hosted all but two preliminary matches of the 1993 Bandy World Championship. To make the games more attractive, preliminary round matches were reduced from 90 to 60 minutes. The final was spectated by 5,338 people. For four months, the venue was equipped with a velodrome, which allowed the venue to host the 1993 UCI Track Cycling World Championships. The velodrome cost NOK 95 million less than building a permanent velodrome in Oslo, which would be hosting the 1993 UCI Road World Championships. The Norwegian Cycling Federation had originally bid for the championships to get a permanent velodrome built at Hasle in Oslo, but declined the offer and instead chose the temporary concept. Because the velodrome only has a circumference of 250 meters (820 ft), the venue's spectator capacity was reduced to 3,000 people.

Hamar was the center for skating sports during the 1994 Winter Olympics. The other venue in town was Hamar Olympic Amphitheatre, which featured the short track speed skating and figure skating events. Vikingskipet held ten speed skating events, five for men and five for women. Norway's Johann Olav Koss took three golds, in the men's 1,500 meters, 5000 meters and 10000 meters. In the latter two, he finished ahead of fellow countryman Kjell Storelid. The men's 500 meters was won by Russia's Aleksandr Golubev ahead of fellow countryman Sergey Klevchenya, while the men's 1000 meters was won by American Dan Jansen. Koss and Jansen won their olympic golds setting new world record time on their distances. For women, American Bonnie Blair defended her two 1992 golds in 500 meters and 1000 meters. Austria's Emese Hunyady won the 1500 meters ahead of Russia's Svetlana Bazhanova and Germany's Gunda Niemann. However, Bazhanova took gold ahead of Nemeth-Hunyady on the 3000 meters, with Germany's Claudia Pechstein in third. Pechstein would go on to win the 5000 meters ahead of Niemann.

Vikingskipet was proposed to also host curling, should it be included in the Olympic program. It had been a demonstration sport in 1988 and 1992 Olympics, but was eventually discarded from the Lillehammer program. The event would have used the same production equipment as for speed skating, and would have consisted of a four-team tournament for both men and women, and would have been held during the Games' two last days. Vikingskipet was the venue for ice sledge speed skating during the 1994 Winter Paralympics. Eight events were held, four for women and four for men. The event had 22 participants from 7 nations competing for 24 medals, resulting in 23 of 24 medals being awarded to Norwegian athletes. Atle Haglund set two world records.

The venue is the national stadium for speed skating in Norway. It hosts annual ISU Speed Skating World Cup, and has in addition hosted many European and world championships. This includes the World Allround Speed Skating Championships in 1993 (for men), 1999, 2004, 2009, 2013 and 2017 tournaments. The World Sprint Speed Skating Championships has been held in 1997, 2002 and 2007, while the World Single Distance Championships was held in 1996. The European Speed Skating Championships has been held four times, in 1994, 2000, 2006, 2010 and 2014.

Since 1996, Vikingskipet has hosted The Gathering, a computer party which is held every Easter. Concerts held at Vikingskipet include Andrea Bocelli (2005), Beyoncé (2007), Cliff Richard (2007), and Stevie Wonder (2008). The Norway women's national football team played Sweden on 21 January 1996, winning 4–0. Vikingskipet hosted a round of the Speedway Grand Prix in 2002, 2003 and 2004. It was also the service depot and race headquarters for Rally Norway, which was arranged in 2006, 2007 and 2009. The latter two were part of the World Rally Championship.

In March 2011, the Norwegian Skating Association announced that they indented that the Norwegian World Cup events would be moved to Sørmarka Arena in Stavanger, due to low attendance at Vikingskipet. Vikingskipet has been selected to host the 2013 World Allround Speed Skating Championships. Lillehammer hosted the 2016 Winter Youth Olympics, with Vikingskipet hosting the long track speed skating events.

In 2023, the European Cybersecurity Challenge took place in Vikingskipet.

== Rink records ==
Vikingskipet is one of few indoor speed skating venues in the world, which has allowed for many world records. The following is a list of the rink records, including the distance, gender, the record time, the athlete who set the record, the country they represent, and the date the record was set.

Men
Distance	Time	Skater	Country	Date
100 m	9.78	Pekka Koskela	Finland	6 November 2004
500 m	33.97	Jordan Stolz	United States	12 December 2025
1000 m	1:07.63	Jordan Stolz	United States	13 December 2025
1500 m	1:44.16	Jordan Stolz	United States	12 December 2025
3000 m	3:42.27	Sverre Lunde Pedersen	Norway	27 October 2018
5000 m	6:07.58	Metoděj Jílek	Czechia	13 December 2025
10000 m	12.41.56	Nils van der Poel	Sweden	6 November 2022
Sprint combination	138.775	Lee Kyou-hyuk	South Korea	20–21 January 2007
Mini combination	151.949	Johan Röjler	Sweden	12–13 February 2002
Small combination	155.699	Jarmo Valtonen	Finland	1–2 November 2003
Big combination	150.748	Sven Kramer	Netherlands	7–8 February 2009
Team pursuit (8 laps)	3:48.67	—	United States	13 November 2004
Team sprint	1:18.13	—	China	13 March 2025

Women
Distance	Time	Skater	Country	Date
100 m	11.15	Linda Olsen	Norway	3 November 2002
500 m	37.05	Femke Kok	Netherlands	12 December 2025
1000 m	1:14.75	Miho Takagi	Japan	15 March 2025
1500 m	1:54.65	Ireen Wüst	Netherlands	25 January 2008
3000 m	3:58.00	Irene Schouten	Netherlands	5 March 2022
5000 m	6:50.08	Martina Sáblíková	Czech Republic	21 November 2009
10000 m	16:44.01	Nina Tørset	Norway	18 January 2015
Sprint combination	151.935	Anni Friesinger	Germany	20–21 January 2007
Mini combination	166.904	Maren Haugli	Norway	22–23 October 2005
Big combination	225.097	Anja Neumann	Germany	19-20 January 2019
Team pursuit (6 laps)	3:00.90	—	Canada	28 November 2010
Team sprint	1:25.57	—	Netherlands	13 March 2025
Small combination	159.736	Ireen Wüst	Netherlands	11–12 January 2014

== World records ==
Vikingskipet has been the venues for world records in speed skating, track cycling, ice sledge speed racing and frisbee. The following is a list of world records set in Vikingskipet, including the sport, event, gender, time or distance, the athlete, their country and the date the record was set. During the 1994 Winter Olympics, four of the five distances for men's speed skating received new world records.

Sport	Event	Gender	Time/distance	Athlete	Country	Date
Speed skating	500 m	Men	35.92	Dan Jansen	United States	4 December 1993
Speed skating	1000 m	Men	1:12.43	Dan Jansen	United States	18 February 1994
Speed skating	1500 m	Men	1:51.60	Rintje Ritsma	Netherlands	8 January 1994
Speed skating	1500 m	Men	1:51.29	Johann Olav Koss	Norway	16 February 1994
Speed skating	5000 m	Men	6:35.53	Johann Olav Koss	Norway	4 December 1993
Speed skating	5000 m	Men	6:34.96	Johann Olav Koss	Norway	13 February 1994
Speed skating	10000 m	Men	13:30.55	Johann Olav Koss	Norway	20 February 1994
Speed skating	Big combination	Men	156.201	Rintje Ritsma	Netherlands	7–9 January 1994
Speed skating	Big combination	Men	152.651	Rintje Ritsma	Netherlands	6–7 February 1994
Speed skating	3000 m	Women	4:07.13	Claudia Pechstein	Germany	13 December 1997
Speed skating	3000 m	Women	4:00.26	Gunda Niemann-Stirnemann	Germany	17 February 2001
Speed skating	5000 m	Women	7:13.29	Gunda Niemann-Stirnemann	Germany	6 December 1993
Speed skating	5000 m	Women	6:56.84	Gunda Niemann-Stirnemann	Germany	16 January 2000
Speed skating	Small combination	Women	167.282	Gunda Niemann-Stirnemann	Germany	7–9 January 1994
Speed skating	Small combination	Women	161.479	Gunda Niemann-Stirnemann	Germany	6–7 February 1994
Track cycling	1 hour	Men	51.596 km	Graeme Obree	United Kingdom	17 July 1993
Track cycling	4000 m individual pursuit	Men	4:23.283	Philippe Ermenault	France	18 July 1993
Track cycling	4000 m individual pursuit	Men	4:22.668	Graeme Obree	United Kingdom	18 July 1993
Track cycling	4000 m individual pursuit	Men	4:20.894	Graeme Obree	United Kingdom	19 July 1993
Track cycling	4000 m team pursuit	Men	4:03.840	—	Australia	20 July 1993
Track cycling	3000 m individual pursuit	Women	3:37.347	Rebecca Twigg	United States	20 August 1993
Ice sledge speed racing	1000 m LW 11	Men	3:14.21	Atle Haglund	Norway	18 March 1994
Ice sledge speed racing	1500 m LW 11	Men	3:21.29	Atle Haglund	Norway	20 March 1994
Frisbee	—	Men	133.72 m	Sune Wentzel	Norway	12 March 1997
Frisbee	—	Men	143.41 m	Sune Wentzel	Norway	8 June 1999

== See also ==
- List of indoor arenas in Norway
- List of indoor arenas in Nordic countries
- List of indoor speed skating rinks

Preceded by Oulunkylä Ice Rink; Helsinki	Bandy World Championship; Final Venue; 1993	Succeeded by John Rose Minnesota Oval; Roseville
Preceded by Luis Puig Velodrome; Valencia	UCI Track Cycling World Championships; Venue; 1993	Succeeded by Paolo Borsellino Velodrome; Palermo
