= Vikingskipet Station =

Railway station in Hamar Municipality, Norway

Vikingskipet
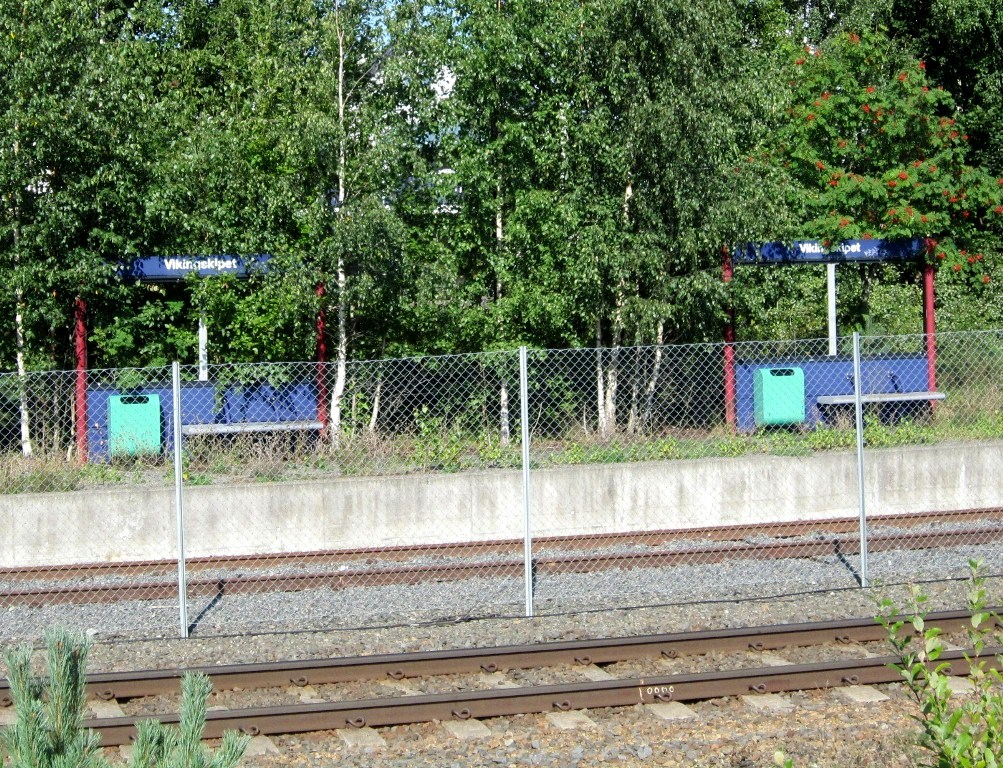

General information
- Location: Åkervika, Hamar; Norway
- Coordinates: 60°47′33″N 11°5′43″E
- Owner: Norwegian National Rail Administration
- Operator: Norwegian State Railways
- Line: Røros Line
- Distance: 126.260 km (78.454 mi)
- Platforms: 1 side platform

History
- Opened: 16 August 1993
- Closed: 1994
Location

Vikingskipet Station (Norwegian: Vikingskipet holdeplass) was a temporary railway station located at Åkervika in Hamar, Norway, on the Røros Line. The station was officially opened on 16 August 1993, and was used during 1993 and 1994 to allow spectators direct access to the sports venue Vikingskipet for the 1993 UCI Track Cycling World Championships and the speed skating at the 1994 Winter Olympics, saving them a 1 kilometer (0.6 mi) walk from Hamar Station. The station is a cul-de-sac station which is electrified, unlike the rest of the Røros Line. Officially is a side track of Hamar Station, denoted track 42.

== History ==
Vikkingskipet, officially known as Hamar Olympic Hall, was built in Åkervika ahead of the 1994 Winter Olympics to host speed skating. It was built just outside a comfortable walking distance from downtown Hamar and Hamar Station. Vikingskipet Station was officially opened on 16 August 1993.

The station allowed spectators direct access to the arena for two events. The first was the 1993 UCI Track Cycling World Championships and the second speed skating at the 1994 Winter Olympics. The station has not been used since the Olympics, although it has never officially been decommissioned. The Norwegian National Rail Administration proposed in 2006 the re-opening the station in conjunction with larger events at the arena.

== Facilities ==
Officially Vikingskipet Station is part of Hamar Station and denoted track 42. The track is 950 meters (3,120 ft) long and ends Vikingskipet. The section runs parallel to the Røros Line, but unlike the mainline it is electrified. It is not possible for trains serving Vikingskipet to continue onward eastwards on the Røros Line. Although not been used for revenue services since 1994, the track and station remain operational.
