= Stephen Gough (speed skater) =

Canadian speed skater

Personal information
- Born: 14 October 1972 (age 52); Fredericton, New Brunswick, Canada

Sport
- Sport: Short track speed skating

Stephen Gough (born 14 October 1972) is a Canadian short track speed skater. He competed in the men's 5000 metre relay event at the 1994 Winter Olympics.
