= Zhang Hongbo (speed skater) =

Chinese speed skater

Personal information
- Nationality: Chinese
- Born: 15 August 1972 (age 52)

Sport
- Sport: Short track speed skating

Zhang Hongbo (Chinese: 张洪波; born 15 August 1972) is a Chinese short track speed skater. He competed in the men's 5000 metre relay event at the 1994 Winter Olympics. He won the bronze medal in the 1996 Asian Winter Games.
