= Yang He (speed skater) =

Chinese speed skater

Personal information
- Nationality: Chinese
- Born: 3 February 1972 (age 53)

Sport
- Sport: Short track speed skating

Yang He (born 3 February 1972) is a Chinese short track speed skater. He competed in the men's 5000 metre relay event at the 1994 Winter Olympics.
