= Randy Bartz =

Short-track speed skater

Personal information
- Full name: Randall Bartz
- Born: October 7, 1968 (age 57) Roseville, Minnesota, U.S.
Medal record
Men's short track speed skating
Representing the United States
Olympic Games
Silver medal – second place	1994 Lillehammer	5000 m relay

Randall "Randy" Bartz (born October 7, 1968) is an American short track speed skater who competed in the 1994 Winter Olympics.

He was born in Roseville, Minnesota.

In 1994 he was a member of the American relay team which won the silver medal in the 5000 metre relay competition.
