= Åkersvika =

Nature reserve in Norway

- IUCN category Ia (strict nature reserve)
- Location within Norway
- Location: Hamar, Norway
- Coordinates: 60.7923°N 11.111°E
- Area: 424 ha (1,050 acres)
- Established: 1974

Ramsar Wetland
- Designated: 9 July 1974
- Reference no.: 13

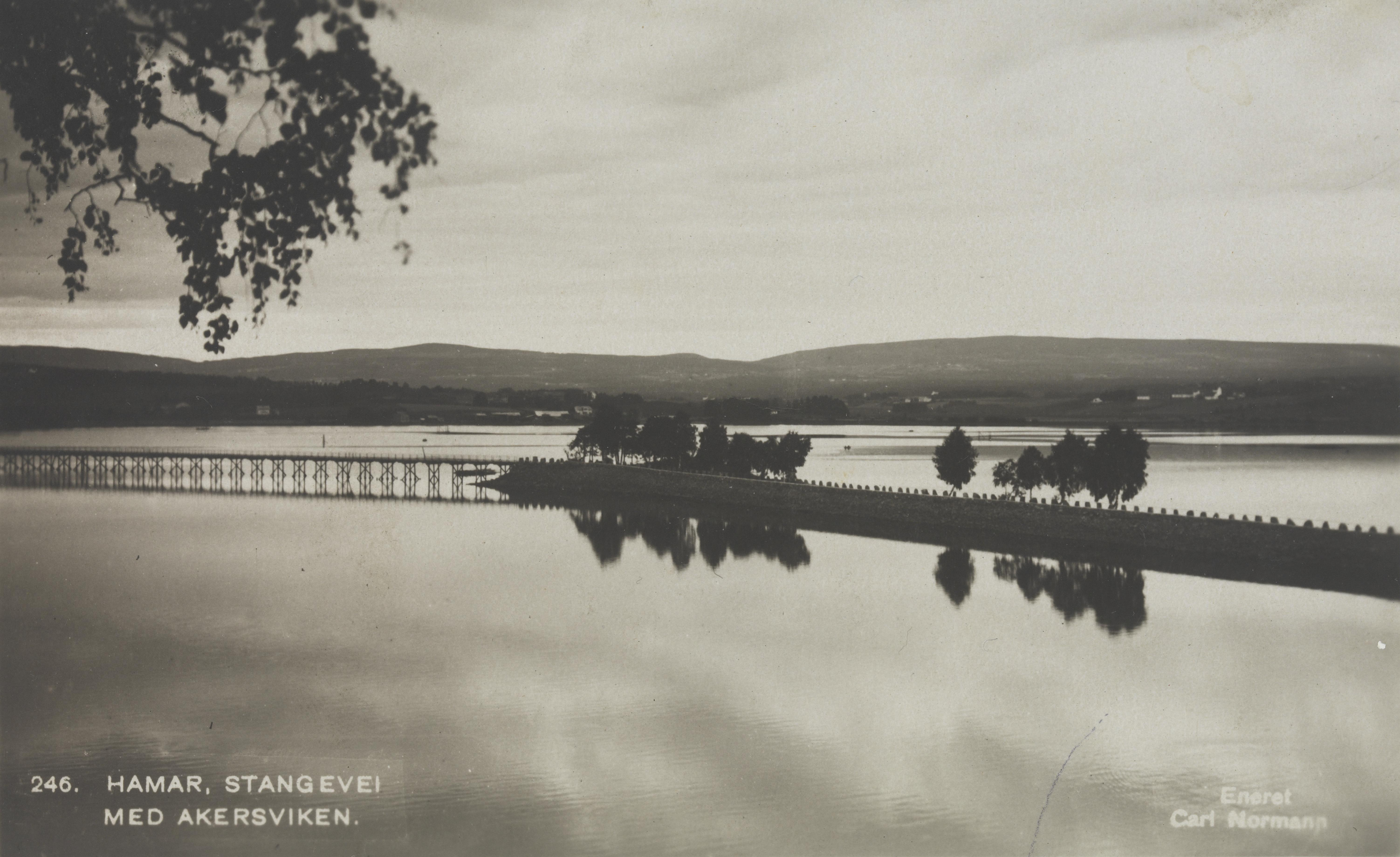
Åkersvika reserve

Åkersvika is a 424-hectare (1,050-acre) wetland nature reserve and Ramsar site in Hamar, Norway. It became Norway's first Ramsar site in 1974. Vikingskipet, the speed skating venue for the 1994 Winter Olympics, was built in the site, creating controversy. European Route E6 also runs through the site, and the Norwegian Public Roads Administration has plans to expand the road to a four-lane motorway.
