= 1994 Winter Olympics medal table =

1994 Winter Olympics medals
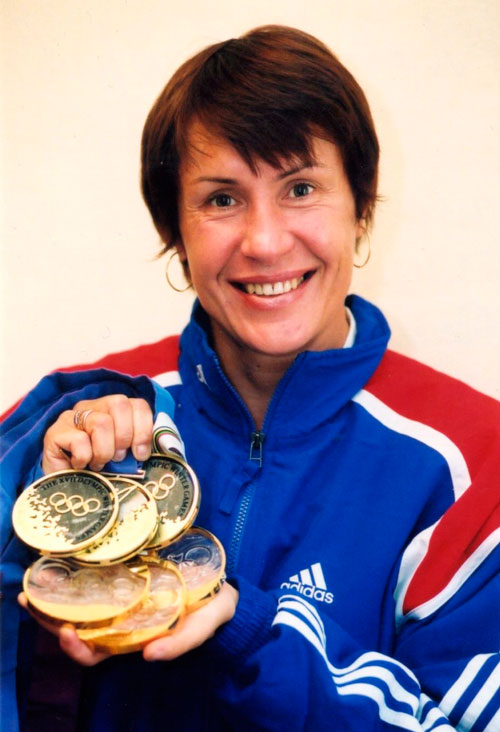
- Russian cross-country skier Lyubov Yegorova finished tied for the most golds among individual athletes at the 1994 games, with three.
- Location: Lillehammer, Norway

Highlights
- Most gold medals: Russia (11)
- Most total medals: Norway (26)
- Medalling NOCs: 22

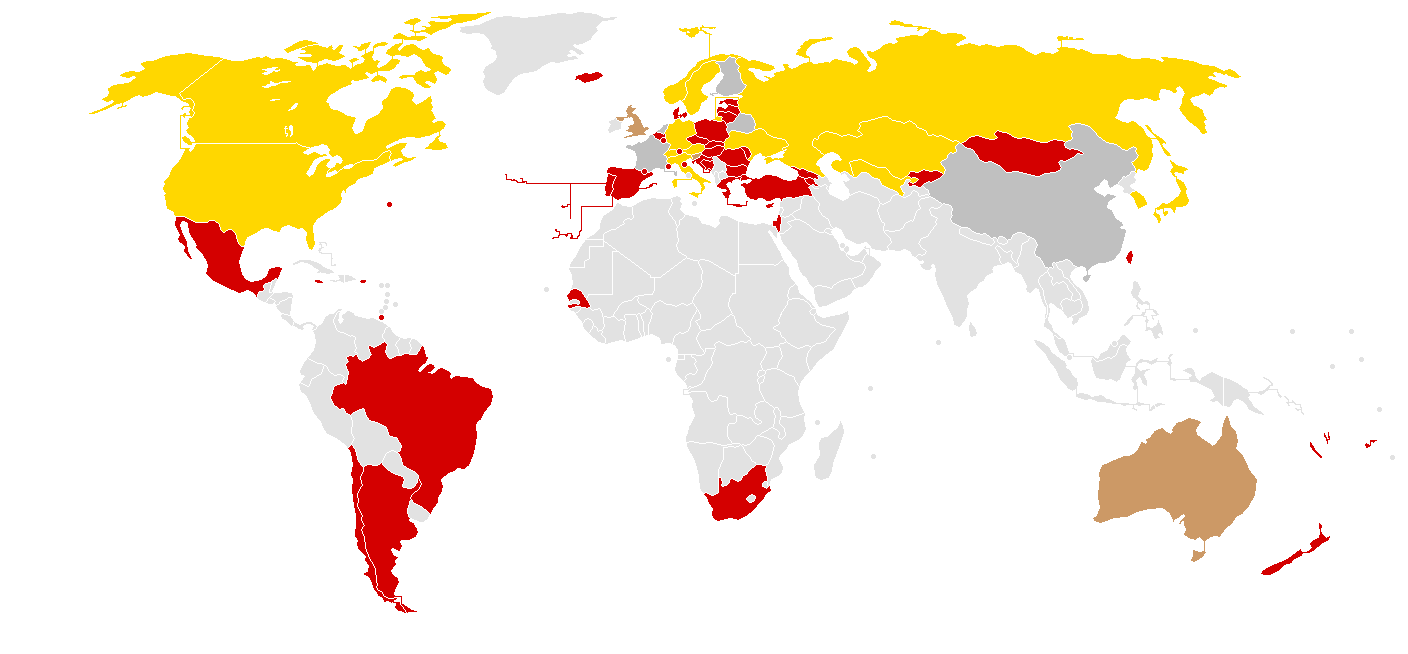
1994 Winter Olympic Games Medals map Legend: Gold represents countries that won at least one gold medal Silver represents countries that won at least one silver medal Bronze represents countries that won at least one bronze medal Red represents countries that did not win any medals Grey represents countries that did not participate

The 1994 Winter Olympics, officially known as the XVII Winter Olympics, were an international winter multi-sport event held in Lillehammer, Norway, from 12 to 27 February 1994. 1,737 athletes representing 67 National Olympic Committees (NOCs) participated. The games featured 61 events in 6 sports and 12 disciplines. Due to scheduling changes made in 1986 with the intent to begin holding the Summer Olympics and Winter Olympics in different years for the first time and moving forward, this edition of the Winter Olympics took place only two years after the previous event.

Athletes representing 22 NOCs received at least one medal, with 14 NOCs winning at least one gold medal. Six NOCs won their first Winter Olympic medals: Australia, Belarus, Kazakhstan, Slovenia, Ukraine, and Uzbekistan. Three of these, Kazakhstan, Ukraine, and Uzbekistan, won their first Winter Olympic gold medals. The three first-time gold medalist NOCs and Belarus were all competing in their first Olympic Games as independent National Olympic Committees following the breakup of the Soviet Union.

Russia, in its first Winter Olympics after the dissolution of the Soviet Union, won the most gold medals, with 11, while host nation Norway had the most medals overall, with 26. Among individual participants, Norwegian speed skater Johann Olav Koss and Russian cross-country skier Lyubov Yegorova tied for the most gold medals, with three each, while Italian cross-country skier Manuela Di Centa had the most medals overall with five (two gold, two silver, and one bronze).

== Medal table ==
The medal table is based on information provided by the International Olympic Committee (IOC) and is consistent with IOC conventional sorting in its published medal tables. The table uses the Olympic medal table sorting method. By default, the table is ordered by the number of gold medals the athletes from a nation have won, where a nation is an entity represented by a NOC. The number of silver medals is taken into consideration next and then the number of bronze medals. If teams are still tied, equal ranking is given and they are listed alphabetically by their IOC country code.

* Host nation (Norway)

1994 Winter Olympics medal table
Rank	NOC	Gold	Silver	Bronze	Total
1	Russia	11	8	4	23
2	Norway*	10	11	5	26
3	Germany	9	7	8	24
4	Italy	7	5	8	20
5	United States	6	5	2	13
6	South Korea	4	1	1	6
7	Canada	3	6	4	13
8	Switzerland	3	4	2	9
9	Austria	2	3	4	9
10	Sweden	2	1	0	3
11	Japan	1	2	2	5
12	Kazakhstan	1	2	0	3
13	Ukraine	1	0	1	2
14	Uzbekistan	1	0	0	1
15	Belarus	0	2	0	2
16	Finland	0	1	5	6
17	France	0	1	4	5
18	Netherlands	0	1	3	4
19	China	0	1	2	3
20	Slovenia	0	0	3	3
21	Great Britain	0	0	2	2
22	Australia	0	0	1	1
Totals (22 entries)		61	61	61	183

== See also ==
- All-time Olympic Games medal table
- 1994 Winter Paralympics medal table
