= Sune Wentzel =

Sune Wentzel (born 6 July 1971 in Oslo) is a former Norwegian frisbeer. He has six world titles, and set two world indoor distance records. Sune has several world medals and other international titles. Sune has left a spectacular image of the frisbee environment in Norway.

== Achievements ==
- Overall World Championship Golds (7): 1993, 1997, 1999
- World Championship Gold in Freestyle: 2003 (together with Tom Leitner and Paul Kenny)
- World Championship gold in DDC: 1997 (together with Aksel Finborud)
- World Championship Gold in SCF: 1999
