= Penèlope di Lella =

Dutch speed skater

Personal information
- Nationality: Dutch
- Born: 17 April 1974 (age 50); The Hague, Netherlands

Sport
- Sport: Short track speed skating

Penèlope di Lella (born 17 April 1974) is a Dutch short track speed skater. She competed in three events at the 1994 Winter Olympics.
