= Erik Duijvelshoff =

Dutch speed skater

Personal information
- Nationality: Dutch
- Born: 15 April 1972 (age 52); Amsterdam, Netherlands

Sport
- Sport: Short track speed skating

Erik Duijvelshoff (born 15 April 1972) is a Dutch short track speed skater. He competed in two events at the 1994 Winter Olympics.
