= Oleg Pavlov (speed skater) =

Russian speed skater

Personal information
- Native name: Олег Валеръевич Павлов
- Full name: Oleg Valeryevich Pavlov
- Nationality: Russian
- Born: 26 December 1966 (age 59) Yekaterinburg, Russia
- Height: 172 cm (5 ft 8 in)
- Weight: 70 kg (154 lb)

Sport
- Country: Russia
- Sport: Speed skating

Oleg Valeryevich Pavlov (Russian: Олег Валерьевич Павлов; born 26 November 1966) is a Russian former speed skater. He competed in three events at the 1994 Winter Olympics.
