= Morten Staubo =

Norwegian speed skater

Personal information
- Nationality: Norwegian
- Born: 6 May 1959 (age 65); Oslo, Norway

Sport
- Sport: Speed skating
- Club: Oslo SK

Morten Kristian Johansen Staubo (born 6 May 1959) is a Norwegian speed skater. He was born in Oslo, and represented the club Oslo SK. He competed in short track speed skating at the 1994 Winter Olympics.
