= Per Bengtsson =

Swedish speed skater

Per Olov Bengtsson (born May 31, 1967) is a former ice speed skater from Sweden. He represented his native country in three consecutive Winter Olympics: 1988 in Calgary, Canada, 1992 in Albertville, and 1994 in Lillehammer.
