= Bjørnar Elgetun =

Norwegian short track speed skater

Personal information
- Nationality: Norwegian
- Born: 1 December 1971 (age 53); Lørenskog

Sport
- Sport: Speed skating
- Club: Søndre Høland

Bjørnar Elgetun (born 1 December 1971) is a Norwegian speed skater. He was born in Lørenskog, and represented the club Søndre Høland Sportsklubb. He competed in short track speed skating at the 1994 Winter Olympics.
