= Dezideriu Horvath =

Romanian speed skater

Personal information
- Nationality: Romanian
- Born: 7 April 1970 (age 54); Huedin, Romania

Sport
- Sport: Speed skating

Dezideriu Horvath (born 7 April 1970) is a Romanian speed skater. He competed at the 1994 Winter Olympics and the 1998 Winter Olympics.
