= Gisle Elvebakken =

Norwegian short track speed skater

Personal information
- Born: 27 August 1970 (age 54); Tromsø, Norway

Sport
- Sport: Speed skating

Gisle Elvebakken (born 27 August 1970) is a Norwegian speed skater. He was born in Tromsø. He competed in short track speed skating at the 1992 and 1994 Winter Olympics.
