= Tore Klevstuen =

Norwegian short track speed skater

Personal information
- Nationality: Norwegian
- Born: 12 June 1966 (age 59); Oppdal Municipality, Norway

Sport
- Sport: Speed skating
- Club: Oslo SK

Tore Johan Klevstuen (born 12 June 1966) is a Norwegian speed skater. He was born in Oppdal Municipality, and represented the club Oslo SK. He competed in short track speed skating at the 1994 Winter Olympics.
