= Thomas Kumm =

German speed skater

Personal information
- Nationality: German
- Born: 23 January 1969 (age 56); Berlin, Germany

Sport
- Sport: Speed skating

Thomas Kumm (born 23 January 1969) is a German speed skater. He competed in three events at the 1994 Winter Olympics.
