= Kjell Storelid =

Norwegian speed skater

Personal information
- Nationality: Norwegian
- Born: 24 October 1970 (age 55) Stord Municipality, Norway
- Height: 1.75 m (5 ft 9 in)
- Weight: 77 kg (170 lb)

Sport
- Country: Norway
- Sport: Speed skating
- Club: Sk-94; Stord TIL
- Turned pro: 1985
- Retired: 2002

Achievements and titles
- Personal best(s): 500 m: 38.86 (1988); 1000 m: 1:15.35 (2002); 1500 m: 1:52.19 (1999); 3000 m: 3:54.14 (2002); 5000 m: 6:30.05 (1999); 10 000 m: 14:27.24 (2002)
Medal record
Men's Speed skating
Silver medal – second place	1994 Lillehammer	5,000m
Silver medal – second place	1994 Lillehammer	10,000m

Kjell Storelid (born 24 October 1970) is a Norwegian former speed skater. His best achievement on the ice was two silver medals on 5,000 m and 10,000 m at the Winter Olympics 1994 in Lillehammer – behind Johann Olav Koss. In the two next Olympic games Storelid came 5th and 8th on 10,000 m. Even though Storelid was a typical long distance racer, he has a 6th place in the World Championships and a 5th place from the European Championships. He has won one Norwegian championship – 5,000 m in 2000.

== Personal records ==
- 500 m – 38.86
- 1,500 m – 1:52.19
- 5,000 m – 6:30.05
- 10,000 m – 14:27.24
